= Marius Radu =

Marius Radu can refer to:

- Marius Radu (footballer) (born 1977), a Romanian footballer
- Marius Radu (swimmer) (born 1992), a Romanian swimmer
