= Alexandru Bourceanu =

Romanian footballer

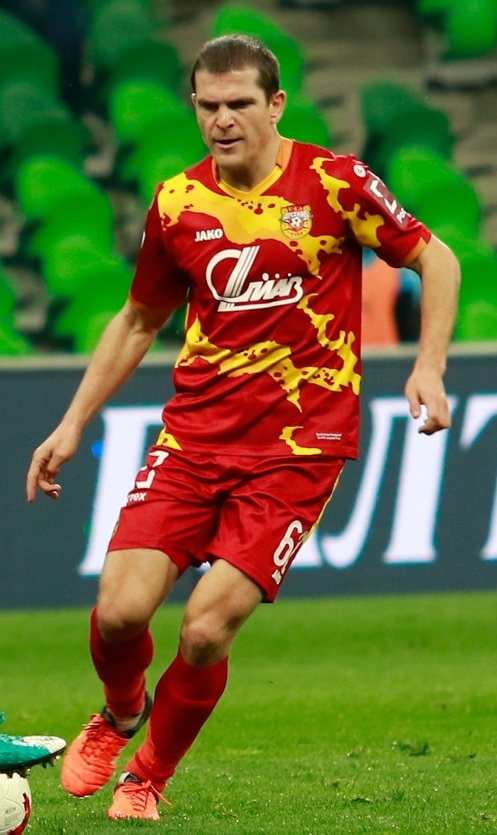
- Bourceanu with Arsenal Tula in 2017

Personal information
- Date of birth: 24 April 1985 (age 41)
- Place of birth: Galați, Romania
- Height: 1.76 m (5 ft 9 in)
- Position: Defensive midfielder

Team information
- Current team: Unirea Dej (head coach)

Youth career
- Salbero Galați
- –2004: Dunărea Galați

Senior career*
| Years | Team | Apps | (Gls) |
| 2004–2008 | Dunărea Galați | 96 | (7) |
| 2008–2009 | Oțelul Galați | 31 | (1) |
| 2009–2011 | Politehnica Timișoara | 54 | (2) |
| 2011–2014 | Steaua București | 80 | (3) |
| 2014–2015 | Trabzonspor | 12 | (0) |
| 2014–2015 | → Steaua București (loan) | 11 | (0) |
| 2016–2017 | Steaua București | 27 | (0) |
| 2017–2018 | Arsenal Tula | 33 | (0) |
| 2018–2019 | Dunărea Călărași | 22 | (0) |
| 2019 | Gloria Buzău | 7 | (0) |
| 2023 | Speed Academy | 3 | (0) |
| 2024 | Speed Academy | 0 | (0) |
| Total | | 376 | (13) |

International career
| 2009–2014 | Romania | 27 | (0) |

Managerial career
- 2024: LPS HD Clinceni (assistant)
- 2024–2025: Speed Academy
- 2026–: Unirea Dej
- * Club domestic league appearances and goals

Alexandru Bourceanu (born 24 April 1985) is a Romanian professional football manager and former player, currently in charge of Liga III club Unirea Dej.

A defensive midfielder, he was known for his combative playing style, being physically strong in spite of his short stature.

He played for the Romania national minifootball team with whom he won the 2023 WMF World Cup.

== Career ==
=== Steaua București ===
Born in Galaţi, Bourceanu has played as a defensive midfielder for various local clubs. He transferred from Politehnica Timișoara to Steaua București in the summer of 2011. After just 10 league matches, Bourceanu became team's captain.

=== Trabzonspor ===
On 3 February 2014, Trabzonspor completed a 3.5-year deal for an undisclosed fee for the 28-year-old midfielder who had less than six months left on his contract. He was loaned back home to recover completely from an injury.

=== Arsenal Tula ===
On 13 January 2017, he signed a contract with the Russian Premier League side Arsenal Tula. The contract is for 1.5 years with an additional one-year extension option.

=== Gloria Buzău ===
On 29 October 2019, Bourceanu signed a one-season contract with Liga II club SCM Gloria Buzău.

== Career statistics ==
=== Club ===
Appearances and goals by club, season and competition
| Club | Season | League | | | National cup (Note: Includes Cupa României, Russian Cup) | | Continental | | Other | | Total | |
| Club | Season | Division | Apps | Goals | Apps | Goals | Apps | Goals | Apps | Goals | Apps | Goals |
|---|---|---|---|---|---|---|---|---|---|---|---|---|
| Dunărea Galați | 2004–05 | Divizia B | 14 | 0 | 0 | 0 | – | | – | | 14 | 0 |
| Dunărea Galați | 2005–06 | Divizia B | 26 | 0 | 1 | 0 | – | | – | | 27 | 0 |
| Dunărea Galați | 2006–07 | Liga II | 24 | 2 | 0 | 0 | – | | – | | 24 | 2 |
| Dunărea Galați | 2007–08 | Liga II | 32 | 5 | 0 | 0 | – | | – | | 32 | 5 |
| Dunărea Galați | Total | | 96 | 7 | 1 | 0 | 0 | 0 | 0 | 0 | 97 | 7 |
| Oțelul Galați | 2008–09 | Liga I | 31 | 1 | 1 | 0 | – | | – | | 32 | 1 |
| Politehnica Timișoara | 2009–10 | Liga I | 29 | 1 | 0 | 0 | 9 (Note: Three appearances in UEFA Champions League, six appearances in UEFA Europa League) | 0 | – | | 38 | 1 |
| Politehnica Timișoara | 2010–11 | Liga I | 25 | 1 | 2 | 0 | 4 (Note: Appearances in UEFA Europa League) | 0 | – | | 31 | 1 |
| Politehnica Timișoara | Total | | 54 | 2 | 2 | 0 | 13 | 0 | 0 | 0 | 69 | 2 |
| Steaua București | 2011–12 | Liga I | 31 | 0 | 2 | 0 | 9 | 0 | – | | 42 | 0 |
| Steaua București | 2012–13 | Liga I | 32 | 3 | 0 | 0 | 12 | 0 | – | | 44 | 3 |
| Steaua București | 2013–14 | Liga I | 17 | 0 | 2 | 0 | 11 (Note: Appearances in UEFA Champions League) | 1 | 1 (Note: Appearance in Supercupa României) | 0 | 31 | 1 |
| Steaua București | Total | | 80 | 3 | 4 | 0 | 32 | 1 | 1 | 0 | 117 | 4 |
| Trabzonspor | 2013–14 | Süper Lig | 12 | 0 | – | | 2 | 0 | – | | 14 | 0 |
| Steaua București (loan) | 2014–15 | Liga I | 11 | 0 | 2 | 0 | 3 | 0 | 2 (Note: Appearances in Cupa Ligii) | 0 | 18 | 0 |
| Steaua București | 2015–16 | Liga I | 9 | 0 | 2 | 0 | – | | 3 | 0 | 14 | 0 |
| Steaua București | 2016–17 | Liga I | 18 | 0 | 1 | 0 | 8 (Note: Two appearances in UEFA Champions League, six appearances in UEFA Europa League) | 0 | 0 | 0 | 27 | 0 |
| Steaua București | Total | | 27 | 0 | 3 | 0 | 8 | 0 | 3 | 0 | 41 | 0 |
| Arsenal Tula | 2016–17 | Russian Premier League | 13 | 0 | – | | – | | 2 (Note: Appearances in Russian Premier League promotion/relegation play-offs) | 0 | 15 | 0 |
| Arsenal Tula | 2017–18 | Russian Premier League | 20 | 0 | 1 | 0 | – | | – | | 21 | 0 |
| Arsenal Tula | Total | | 33 | 0 | 1 | 0 | 0 | 0 | 2 | 0 | 36 | 0 |
| Dunărea Călărași | 2018–19 | Liga I | 22 | 0 | 2 | 0 | – | | – | | 24 | 0 |
| Gloria Buzău | 2019–20 | Liga II | 7 | 0 | – | | – | | – | | 7 | 0 |
| Speed Academy | 2022–23 | Liga IV | 3 | 0 | – | | – | | – | | 3 | 0 |
| Speed Academy | 2023–24 | Liga IV | 0 | 0 | – | | – | | 1 (Note: Appearance in Liga IV promotion play-offs) | 0 | 1 | 0 |
| Speed Academy | Total | | 3 | 0 | 0 | 0 | 0 | 0 | 1 | 0 | 4 | 0 |
| Career total | | | 376 | 13 | 16 | 0 | 58 | 1 | 8 | 0 | 459 | 14 |

=== International ===
Appearances and goals by national team and year
| National team | Year | Apps | Goals |
|---|---|---|---|
| Romania | 2009 | 1 | 0 |
| Romania | 2010 | 0 | 0 |
| Romania | 2011 | 6 | 0 |
| Romania | 2012 | 10 | 0 |
| Romania | 2013 | 7 | 0 |
| Romania | 2014 | 3 | 0 |
| Total | | 27 | 0 |

== Honours ==
Steaua București

- Liga I: 2012–13, 2014–15
- Cupa României: 2014–15
- Cupa Ligii: 2014–15, 2015–16
- Supercupa României: 2013

Speed Academy

- Liga IV – Argeș County: 2023–24
