= Ciprian Negoiță =

Romanian footballer

Personal information
- Full name: Ciprian George Negoiță
- Date of birth: 28 April 1992 (age 34)
- Place of birth: Pitești, Romania
- Height: 1.83 m (6 ft 0 in)
- Position: Defender

Team information
- Current team: Speed Academy
- Number: 6

Youth career
- 2003–2008: Argeș Pitești

Senior career*
Years	Team	Apps	(Gls)
2008–2010	Argeș Pitești II		
2010–2013	Argeș Pitești	45	(1)
2013–2016	Mioveni	49	(1)
2016	SCM Pitești	7	(0)
2017	Pandurii Târgu Jiu	12	(0)
2017–2018	Mioveni	11	(0)
2018–2019	Unirea Bascov	21	(1)
2019–2022	Vedița Colonești	34	(2)
2022	Real Bradu	11	(2)
2023–	Speed Academy	52	(4)
- * Club domestic league appearances and goals as of 11:30, 8 December 2024 (UTC)

Ciprian George Negoiță (born 28 April 1992) is a Romanian professional footballer who plays as a defender for Liga III side Speed Academy Pitești.

== Club career ==
Negoiță was born on 28 April 1992 in Pitești and began playing football at the age of 11 with the youth academy of FC Argeș. He made his senior debut in 2008 with FC Argeș II in Liga III before earning promotion to the first team in Liga II. After three seasons, he transferred to CS Mioveni, where he spent another three years. In 2016, he signed with SCM Pitești, and the following year he made the step up to Liga I with Pandurii Târgu Jiu.

Later in 2017, Negoiță returned to CS Mioveni, before going on to play for Unirea Bascov, Vedița Colonești, and Real Bradu. In 2023, he joined Speed Academy Pitești, where he remains an important member of the squad.

== Honours ==
Vedița Colonești

- Liga III: 2020–21
