= Robert Grecu =

Romanian footballer

Personal information
- Full name: Robert Ionuț Grecu
- Date of birth: 2 June 1998 (age 28)
- Place of birth: Pitești, Romania
- Height: 1.79 m (5 ft 10 in)
- Position: Right winger

Team information
- Current team: Speed Academy
- Number: 14

Youth career
- 2011–2017: Gheorghe Hagi Football Academy

Senior career*
Years	Team	Apps	(Gls)
2017–2019	FC Viitorul	0	(0)
2017	→ FCSB (loan)	2	(0)
2017	→ Argeş Piteşti (loan)	24	(4)
2018	→ Petrolul Ploiești (loan)	11	(1)
2019	→ Daco-Getica București (loan)	15	(3)
2019	Astra Giurgiu	2	(0)
2019–2021	Argeș Pitești	52	(4)
2021–2022	Astra Giurgiu	7	(1)
2022–2023	Viitorul Dăești	17	(2)
2023–	Speed Academy	7	(1)
- * Club domestic league appearances and goals as of 11:32, 8 December 2024 (UTC)

Robert Ionuț Grecu (born 2 June 1998) is a Romanian professional footballer who plays mainly as a right winger for Speed Academy Pitești.

== Club career ==
=== Steaua București ===
Robert Grecu played his first official game in Liga I in 2017, in a 2-1 win against Concordia Chiajna.

== Career statistics ==
As of match played 29 August 2021

Appearances and goals by club, season and competition
Club	Season	League			Cupa României		Europe		Other		Total	
Club	Season	Division	Apps	Goals	Apps	Goals	Apps	Goals	Apps	Goals	Apps	Goals
Argeș Pitești (loan)	2016–17	Liga III	14	12	0	0	—		0	0	14	12
FCSB (loan)	2017–18	Liga I	2	0	0	0	0	0	0	0	2	0
Argeș Pitești (loan)	2017–18	Liga II	24	4	1	0	—		0	0	25	4
Petrolul Ploiești (loan)	2018–19	Liga II	11	1	0	0	—		0	0	11	1
Daco-Getica București (loan)	2018–19	Liga II	15	2	0	0	—		0	0	15	2
Astra Giurgiu	2019–20	Liga I	2	0	0	0	—		0	0	2	0
Argeș Pitești	2019–20	Liga II	19	0	0	0	—		0	0	19	0
Argeș Pitești	2020–21	Liga I	33	4	1	0	—		0	0	34	4
Argeș Pitești	Total		52	4	1	0	—		0	0	53	4
Astra Giurgiu	2021–22	Liga II	7	1	0	0	—		0	0	7	1
Career total			127	24	2	0	0	0	0	0	129	24
