= ACS Speed Academy Pitești =

Romanian football club

Speed Academy Pitești
- Full name: Asociația Club Sportiv; Speed Academy Pitești
- Nicknames: Piteștenii (The people from Pitești)
- Short name: Speed Academy
- Founded: 2019
- Dissolved: 2025
- Ground: Central (Bradu)
- Capacity: 5,000
- 2024–25: Liga III, Seria VIII, 4th
- Website: https://speedacademy.ro/
Home colours	Away colours

Asociația Club Sportiv Speed Academy Pitești, also known as Speed Academy Pitești, or just Speed Academy was a Romanian football club based in Pitești, Argeș County, which last played in Liga III, the third tier of Romanian football.

== History ==
Speed Academy Pitești was established in 2019 and began competing in Liga V – Argeș County under the guidance of coach Mihai Răduță. The team was in 2nd place in the Center Series, eight points behind ACS Oarja, when the season was suspended in March 2020 due to the COVID-19 pandemic in Romania. However, Speed Academy was admitted to the 2021–22 Liga IV – Argeș County, the first full season post-pandemic, finishing in 5th place.

In the following season, coached by Bogdan Velianu and strengthened by several experienced players such as Cristian Bud, Roberto Ayza, Ionuț Pană, Ciprian Negoiță, Marius Radu, and Alexandru Bourceanu, Speed finished in 2nd place, tied on points with ARO Muscelul Câmpulung.

Speed Academy started the 2023–24 season with Iulian Crivac as head coach but replaced him after the seventh round in late October with Alin Popescu, who managed to lead the team to top the table and secure promotion to the third tier by defeating CSL Nanov, the Teleorman County champions, 5–0 at home and 2–1 away. The squad during the season included Mitroi, Mitrache, Negoiță, Ștefănescu, Păun, Tănase, Ruță, Ayza, Neagu, Duminică, Grecu, Dobra, Trașcă, Mormolea, Pîrciu, and Dalu.

== Honours ==
Liga IV – Argeș County

- Winners (1): 2023–24
- Runners-up (1): 2022–23

Liga V – Argeș County

- Runners-up (1): 2019–20

== League and Cup history ==
Season	Tier	Division	Place	Notes	Cupa României
2024–25	3	Liga III (Seria VIII)	4th	Withdrew	
2023–24	4	Liga IV (AG)	1st (C)	Promoted	Regional stage

Season	Tier	Division	Place	Notes	Cupa României
2022–23	4	Liga IV (AG)	2nd		County phase - Winners
