= 2023–24 Liga IV =

82nd season of Romanian football league

Liga IV
- Season: 2023–24

The 2023–24 Liga IV was the 82nd season of Liga IV and the 56th since the 1968 administrative and territorial reorganization of the country, representing the fourth tier of the Romanian football league system. The champions of each county association played against one from a neighbouring county in a play-off for promotion to Liga III.

The counties were divided into seven regions, each consisting of six counties and the draw was made on 6 February 2024.

== County leagues ==
North–East

- Bacău (BC)
- Botoșani (BT)
- Iași (IS)
- Neamț (NT)
- Suceava (SV)
- Vaslui (VS)

North–West

- Bihor (BH)
- Bistrița-Năsăud (BN)
- Cluj (CJ)
- Maramureș (MM)
- Satu Mare (SM)
- Sălaj (SJ)

Center

- Alba (AB)
- Brașov (BV)
- Covasna (CV)
- Harghita (HR)
- Mureș (MS)
- Sibiu (SB)

West

- Arad (AR)
- Caraș-Severin (CS)
- Gorj (GJ)
- Hunedoara (HD)
- Mehedinți (MH)
- Timiș (TM)

South–West

- Argeș (AG)
- Dâmbovița (DB)
- Dolj (DJ)
- Olt (OT)
- Teleorman (TR)
- Vâlcea (VL)

South

- Bucharest (B)
- Călărași (CL)
- Giurgiu (GR)
- Ialomița (IL)
- Ilfov (IF)
- Prahova (PH)

South–East

- Brăila (BR)
- Buzău (BZ)
- Constanța (CT)
- Galați (GL)
- Tulcea (TL)
- Vrancea (VN)

== Promotion play-off ==
The matches were played on 16 and 23 June 2024.

Team 1	Agg.	Team 2	1st leg	2nd leg
Region 1 (North-East)				
Prosport Vârfu Câmpului (BT)	1–4	(IS) USV Iași	1–2	0–2
Șoimii Gura Humorului (SV)	8–2	(VS) Comstar Vaslui	5–0	3–2
Ceahlăul Piatra Neamț II (NT)	4–2	(BC) Sportul Onești	3–0	1–2
Region 2 (North-West)				
Diosig Bihardiószeg (BH)	9–0	(MM) Academica Recea	5–0	4–0
Silvicultorul Maieru (BN)	1–10	(SM) Oașul Negrești-Oaș	1–4	0–6
Vulturul Mintiu Gherlii (CJ)	12–6	(SJ) Barcău Nușfalău	8–2	4–4
Region 3 (Center)				
Codlea (BV)	2–3	(AB) CIL Blaj	1–2	1–1
Păltiniș Rășinari (SB)	1–2	(HR) Gheorgheni	1–1	0–1
Iernut (MS)	5–1	(CV) Prima Brăduț	4–0	1–1
Region 4 (West)				
Viitorul Severin (MH)	3–8	(GJ) Vulturii Fărcășești	1–5	2–3
Magica Balta Caransebeș (CS)	1–12	(TM) Timișul Șag	1–5	0–7
Viitorul Arad (AR)	3–0	(HD) Minerul Lupeni	0–0	3–0
Region 5 (South-West)				
Iris Titulescu (OT)	1–5	(VL) Sparta Râmnicu Vâlcea	1–1	0–4
Speed Academy Pitești (AG)	7–1	(TR) Nanov	5–0	2–1
Urban Titu (DB)	6–0	(DJ) Metropolitan Ișalnița	3–0	3–0
Region 6 (South)				
Ștefănești (IF)	5–6	(B) ACS FC Dinamo București	2–2	3–4 (a.e.t.)
Venus Independența (CL)	3–5	(IL) Fetești	0–4	3–1
Bolintin Malu Spart (GR)	4–5	(PH) Băicoi	3–3	1–2
Region 7 (South-East)				
Adjud (VN)	3–2	(BZ) Voința Lanurile	2–1	1–1
Viitorul Cireșu (BR)	6–1	(TL) Pescărușul Sarichioi	4–0	2–1
Voința Cudalbi (GL)	2–6	(CT) Medgidia	1–2	1–4

== League standings ==
=== Alba County ===
Team changes from the previous season

- Industria Galda achieved promotion to Liga III.
- CS Ocna Mureș was relegated from Liga III.
- Cuprirom Abrud (14th place) was relegated to Liga V Alba.
- Limbenii Limba (Series I winners), Adu Academy Șona (Series II winners) and FC Lopadea Nouă (Series III winners) were promoted from Liga V Alba.
- Kinder Teiuș withdrew and was replaced by Fortuna Lunca Mureșului.
- Hidromecanica Șugag was spared from relegation and subsequently was renamed Hidro Mecanica Șugag 1984.
- GT Sport Alba Iulia was renamed Unirea Alba Iulia II.

Pos	Team	Pld	W	D	L	GF	GA	GD	Pts	Qualification or relegation
1	CIL Blaj (C, Q)	30	28	2	0	138	26	+112	86	Qualification to promotion play-off
2	Viitorul Sântimbru	30	21	2	7	83	37	+46	65	
3	Ocna Mureș	30	17	6	7	97	54	+43	57	
4	Voința Stremț	30	16	4	10	74	55	+19	52	
5	Energia Săsciori	30	16	4	10	71	52	+19	52	
6	Performanța Ighiu	30	14	6	10	83	41	+42	48	
7	Hidro Mecanica Șugag 1984	30	15	3	12	74	63	+11	48	
8	Inter Unirea	30	14	3	13	56	51	+5	45	
9	ASpicul Daia Romană	30	14	1	15	65	53	+12	43	
10	Adu Academy Șona	30	11	7	12	83	79	+4	40	
11	Unirea Alba Iulia II	30	10	4	16	43	53	−10	34	
12	Fortuna Lunca Mureșului	30	10	1	19	40	79	−39	31	
13	Limbenii Limba	30	9	3	18	43	90	−47	30	
14	Zlatna	30	7	4	19	46	97	−51	25	
15	Viitorul Vama Seacă (R)	30	6	4	20	36	75	−39	22	Relegation to Liga V Alba
16	Lopadea Nouă (R)	30	5	0	25	29	156	−127	15	Relegation to Liga V Alba

Rules for classification: 1) Points; 2) Head-to-head points; 3) Head-to-head goal difference; 4) Head-to-head goals scored; 5) Head-to-head away goals scored; 6) Goal difference; 7) Goals scored.
(C) Champions; (Q) Qualified for the phase indicated; (R) Relegated

=== Arad County ===
Team changes from the previous season

- ACS Socodor achieved promotion to Liga III.
- Athletico Vinga (Series A winners) and Național Sebiș (Series C winners) were promoted from Liga V Arad.
- Păulișana Păuliș II (Series B winners) from Liga V Arad did not have the right to promotion as a reserve team.
- CS Beliu, Victoria Nădlac and Victoria Zăbrani were spared from relegation.

Pos	Team	Pld	W	D	L	GF	GA	GD	Pts	Qualification or relegation
1	Viitorul Arad (C, Q)	28	24	3	1	87	16	+71	75	Qualification to promotion play-off
2	Unirea Sântana	28	22	3	3	83	19	+64	69	
3	Frontiera Curtici	28	17	7	4	74	35	+39	58	
4	Păulișana Păuliș	28	18	3	7	64	36	+28	57	
5	Victoria Felnac	28	17	3	8	96	34	+62	54	
6	Șoimii Șimand	28	14	4	10	59	47	+12	46	
7	Podgoria Pâncota	28	13	6	9	55	42	+13	45	
8	Beliu	28	11	9	8	62	38	+24	42	
9	Glogovăț	28	13	2	13	57	36	+21	41	
10	Victoria Zăbrani	28	9	3	16	38	86	−48	30	
11	Voința Macea	28	7	4	17	42	71	−29	25	
12	Victoria Nădlac	28	7	1	20	28	91	−63	22	
13	Athletico Vinga	28	5	4	19	22	62	−40	19	
14	Național Sebiș	28	3	3	22	30	92	−62	12	
15	ACB Ineu II (Note: ACB Ineu II withdrew after 19 rounds and lost all remaining matches with 0–3.) (R)	28	2	1	25	19	111	−92	7	Relegation to Liga V Arad

Rules for classification: 1) Points; 2) Head-to-head points; 3) Head-to-head goal difference; 4) Head-to-head goals scored; 5) Head-to-head away goals scored; 6) Goal difference; 7) Goals scored.
(C) Champions; (Q) Qualified for the phase indicated; (R) Relegated

=== Argeș County ===
Team changes from the previous season

- ARO Muscelul Câmpulung achieved promotion to Liga III.
- ACS Bălilești (18th place) was relegated to Liga V Argeș.
- Petrolul Hârtiești (North Series winners) and Steaua Negrași (South Series winners) declined promotion from Liga V Argeș.
- Energia Stolnici, Sola Grația Dragoslavele, Viitorul Bârla, Viitorul Rucăr, Muscelul Câmpulung Elite II and Juventus Victoria Bascov withdrew.
- Victoria Buzoești (17th place) was spared from relegation.
- FC Pitești 2008 and Dacia Ștefănești were admitted upon request.
- Muscelul Lerești was renamed Zimbrii Lerești.

Pos	Team	Pld	W	D	L	GF	GA	GD	Pts	Qualification
1	Speed Academy Pitești	20	17	3	0	78	12	+66	54	Qualification to championship play-off
2	Zimbrii Lerești	20	17	2	1	63	16	+47	53	Qualification to championship play-off
3	Costești	20	11	4	5	44	24	+20	37	Qualification to championship play-off
4	Domnești	20	11	1	8	49	32	+17	34	Qualification to championship play-off
5	Internațional Valea Iașului	20	10	3	7	47	29	+18	33	Qualification to championship play-out
6	Pitești 2008	20	8	2	10	32	55	−23	26	Qualification to championship play-out
7	DLR Pitești	20	7	3	10	39	49	−10	24	Qualification to championship play-out
8	Poiana Lacului	20	5	2	13	38	61	−23	17	Qualification to championship play-out
9	Victoria Buzoești	20	4	4	12	40	66	−26	16	Qualification to championship play-out
10	Dacia Ștefănești	20	4	3	13	23	59	−36	15	Qualification to championship play-out
11	Suseni	20	2	1	17	20	70	−50	7	Qualification to championship play-out
12	Mioveni II (Note: Mioveni II withdrew in the first part of the season and all its results were canceled.) (D)	0	0	0	0	0	0	0	0	Withdrew

Rules for classification: 1) Points; 2) Head-to-head points; 3) Head-to-head goal difference; 4) Head-to-head goals scored; 5) Head-to-head away goals scored; 6) Goal difference; 7) Goals scored.
(D) Disqualified
Notes:

Championship play-off

Pos	Team	Pld	W	D	L	GF	GA	GD	Pts	Qualification
1	Speed Academy Pitești (C, Q)	6	5	1	0	20	7	+13	70	Qualification to promotion play-off
2	Zimbrii Lerești	6	4	1	1	14	10	+4	66	
3	Costești	6	1	1	4	6	13	−7	41	
4	Domnești	6	0	1	5	9	19	−10	35	

Rules for classification: 1) Points; 2) Head-to-head points; 3) Head-to-head goal difference; 4) Head-to-head goals scored; 5) Head-to-head away goals scored; 6) Goal difference; 7) Goals scored.
(C) Champions; (Q) Qualified for the phase indicated

Championship play-out

Pos	Team	Pld	W	D	L	GF	GA	GD	Pts	Relegation
5	Internațional Valea Iașului	6	3	0	3	24	20	+4	42	
6	Poiana Lacului	6	6	0	0	29	10	+19	35	
7	DLR Pitești	6	3	0	3	17	20	−3	33	
8	Victoria Buzoești	6	5	0	1	27	14	+13	31	
9	Pitești 2008	6	1	1	4	15	22	−7	30	
10	Dacia Ștefănești	6	1	1	4	8	21	−13	19	
11	Suseni	6	1	0	5	14	27	−13	10	
12	Mioveni II (Note: Mioveni II withdrew in the first part of the season and all its results were canceled.) (D)	0	0	0	0	0	0	0	0	Withdrew

Rules for classification: 1) Points; 2) Head-to-head points; 3) Head-to-head goal difference; 4) Head-to-head goals scored; 5) Head-to-head away goals scored; 6) Goal difference; 7) Goals scored.
(D) Disqualified

=== Bacău County ===
The Liga IV Bacău County was played with twenty-four teams, split into two series of twelve in a double round-robin regular season, followed by a championship play-off between the top two teams from each series, played over six matches per team. Teams entered the play-off with all points and goal difference obtained against the top nine teams in their series. Only clubs with legal personality, holding a C.I.S. (Certificate of Sports Identity), and fielding at least one youth team were eligible to participate.

Team changes from the previous season

- Viitorul Curița achieved promotion to Liga III.
- AS Filipești, Rapid Bacău and Voința Brătești withdrew.
- AFC Bubu, Bamirom Dumbrăveni, Voința Cleja, Viitorul Dămienești, Vulturul Măgirești and Gloria Zemeș were admitted upon request.

Series I

Pos	Team	Pld	W	D	L	GF	GA	GD	Pts	Qualification or relegation
1	Negri	22	20	1	1	90	31	+59	61	Ineligible for promotion
2	Gauss Bacău (Q)	22	17	1	4	80	24	+56	52	Qualification to championship play-off
3	Faraoani	22	13	3	6	67	35	+32	42	Ineligible for promotion
4	Moinești (Q)	22	12	3	7	72	37	+35	39	Qualification to championship play-off
5	Viitorul Nicolae Bălcescu	22	11	2	9	59	41	+18	35	
6	Siretu Săucești	22	11	2	9	56	45	+11	35	
7	Bubu	22	10	4	8	65	46	+19	34	
8	Unirea Bacău	22	11	0	11	65	63	+2	33	
9	Bamirom Dumbrăveni	22	7	1	14	40	67	−27	22	
10	Flamura Roșie Sascut	22	6	2	14	25	69	−44	20	
11	Voința Cleja	22	3	0	19	28	93	−65	9	
12	Viitorul Dămienești	22	1	1	20	32	128	−96	4	

Rules for classification: 1) Points; 2) Head-to-head points; 3) Head-to-head goal difference; 4) Head-to-head goals scored; 5) Head-to-head away goals scored; 6) Goal difference; 7) Goals scored.
(Q) Qualified for the phase indicated

Series II

Pos	Team	Pld	W	D	L	GF	GA	GD	Pts	Qualification or relegation
1	Sportul Onești (Q)	22	20	1	1	141	17	+124	61	Qualification to championship play-off
2	Dofteana	22	16	0	6	60	36	+24	48	Ineligible for promotion
3	Vulturul Măgirești	22	15	0	7	76	31	+45	45	Ineligible for promotion
4	Măgura Cașin	22	15	0	7	58	31	+27	45	Ineligible for promotion
5	Voința Oituz	22	13	1	8	78	48	+30	40	Ineligible for promotion
6	Uzu Dărmănești (Q)	22	11	1	10	44	48	−4	34	Qualification to championship play-off
7	Gloria Zemeș	22	9	6	7	47	31	+16	33	
8	Bradul Mănăstirea Cașin	22	6	3	13	31	77	−46	21	
9	Măgura Târgu Ocna	22	5	5	12	31	66	−35	20	
10	Viitorul Căiuți (Note: Viitorul Căiuți withdrew after 19 rounds and lost all remaining matches with 0–3.)	22	5	1	16	22	63	−41	16	
11	Bârsănești	22	5	0	17	25	91	−66	15	
12	Viitorul Berești-Tazlău	22	2	2	18	27	101	−74	8	

Rules for classification: 1) Points; 2) Head-to-head points; 3) Head-to-head goal difference; 4) Head-to-head goals scored; 5) Head-to-head away goals scored; 6) Goal difference; 7) Goals scored.
(Q) Qualified for the phase indicated
Notes:

Championship play-off

Pos	Team	Pld	W	D	L	GF	GA	GD	Pts	Qualification
1	Sportul Onești (C, Q)	6	4	1	1	111	22	+89	56	Qualification to promotion play-off
2	Gauss Bacău	6	4	1	1	74	27	+47	47	
3	Moinești	6	3	0	3	43	45	−2	32	
4	Uzu Dărmănești	6	0	0	6	26	68	−42	22	

Rules for classification: 1) Points; 2) Head-to-head points; 3) Head-to-head goal difference; 4) Head-to-head goals scored; 5) Head-to-head away goals scored; 6) Goal difference; 7) Goals scored.
(C) Champions; (Q) Qualified for the phase indicated

=== Bihor County ===
The Liga IV Bihor County was played in a double round-robin format across two series, followed by a championship play-off with eight teams (the top four from each series, starting from scratch) and a relegation play-out (also split into two series, with teams maintaining the points accumulated in the first stage).

Team changes from the previous season

- Crișul Sântandrei achieved promotion to Liga III.
- Voința Cheresig (Series I winners) and CSO Ștei (Series II runners-up (Note: CSO Ștei defeated Viitorul Bratca 2–5 away and 5–0 at home, the runner-up of Series I, in the promotion play-off.)) were promoted from Liga V Bihor.
- Luceafărul Oradea was relegated to Liga V Bihor.
- FC Bihor Oradea II withdrew.
- Viitorul Borș and Lotus Băile Felix II withdrew during the previous season.

Series I (North)

Pos	Team	Pld	W	D	L	GF	GA	GD	Pts	Qualification or relegation
1	Diosig Bihardiószeg	16	15	1	0	74	5	+69	46	Qualification to championship play-off
2	Vulturii Săcueni	16	10	3	3	59	16	+43	33	Qualification to championship play-off
3	Foresta Tileagd	16	10	2	4	27	10	+17	32	Qualification to championship play-off
4	Oșorhei	16	8	5	3	38	21	+17	29	Qualification to championship play-off
5	Crișul Aleșd	16	8	0	8	38	42	−4	24	Qualification to championship play-out
6	Unirea Valea lui Mihai	16	3	4	9	23	39	−16	13	Qualification to championship play-out
7	Vadu Crișului	16	3	4	9	13	32	−19	13	Qualification to championship play-out
8	Voința Cheresig	16	1	4	11	12	50	−38	7	Qualification to championship play-out
9	Slovan Valea Cerului	16	2	1	13	6	75	−69	7	Qualification to championship play-out

Rules for classification: 1) Points; 2) Head-to-head points; 3) Head-to-head goal difference; 4) Head-to-head goals scored; 5) Head-to-head away goals scored; 6) Goal difference; 7) Goals scored.

Series II (South)

Pos	Team	Pld	W	D	L	GF	GA	GD	Pts	Qualification
1	CA Oradea	16	13	3	0	67	13	+54	42	Qualification to championship play-off
2	Bihorul Beiuș	16	10	3	3	63	18	+45	33	Qualification to championship play-off
3	Olimpia Salonta	16	9	4	3	42	22	+20	31	Qualification to championship play-off
4	Universitatea Oradea	16	6	4	6	34	37	−3	22	Qualification to championship play-off
5	Unirea Roșia	16	5	5	6	25	29	−4	20	Qualification to championship play-out
6	Viitorul Dobrești	16	6	2	8	28	57	−29	20	Qualification to championship play-out
7	Victoria Avram Iancu	16	4	5	7	27	44	−17	17	Qualification to championship play-out
8	Ștei	16	4	2	10	29	39	−10	14	Qualification to championship play-out
9	Izvorul Cociuba Mare	16	1	0	15	17	73	−56	3	Qualification to championship play-out

Rules for classification: 1) Points; 2) Head-to-head points; 3) Head-to-head goal difference; 4) Head-to-head goals scored; 5) Head-to-head away goals scored; 6) Goal difference; 7) Goals scored.

Championship play-off

Pos	Team	Pld	W	D	L	GF	GA	GD	Pts	Qualification
1	Diosig Bihardiószeg (C, Q)	14	12	1	1	47	9	+38	37	Qualification to promotion play-off
2	Foresta Tileagd	14	10	2	2	37	23	+14	32	
3	CA Oradea	14	8	4	2	34	22	+12	28	
4	Bihorul Beiuș	14	7	2	5	26	16	+10	23	
5	Vulturii Săcueni	14	5	1	8	20	30	−10	16	
6	Olimpia Salonta	14	5	0	9	14	31	−17	15	
7	Oșorhei	14	3	1	10	20	35	−15	10	
8	Universitatea Oradea	14	0	1	13	16	48	−32	1	

Rules for classification: 1) Points; 2) Head-to-head points; 3) Head-to-head goal difference; 4) Head-to-head goals scored; 5) Head-to-head away goals scored; 6) Goal difference; 7) Goals scored.
(C) Champions; (Q) Qualified for the phase indicated

Championship play-out
Series I (North)

Pos	Team	Pld	W	D	L	GF	GA	GD	Pts	Relegation
5	Unirea Valea lui Mihai	8	7	0	1	35	12	+23	34	
6	Crișul Aleșd	8	3	0	5	24	18	+6	33	
7	Vadu Crișului	8	4	1	3	14	11	+3	26	
8	Voința Cheresig (R)	8	5	1	2	18	13	+5	23	Relegation to Liga V Bihor
9	Slovan Valea Cerului (R)	8	0	0	8	9	46	−37	7	Relegation to Liga V Bihor

Rules for classification: 1) Points; 2) Head-to-head points; 3) Head-to-head goal difference; 4) Head-to-head goals scored; 5) Head-to-head away goals scored; 6) Goal difference; 7) Goals scored.
(R) Relegated

Series II (South)

Pos	Team	Pld	W	D	L	GF	GA	GD	Pts	Relegation
5	Unirea Roșia	8	7	0	1	40	7	+33	41	
6	Ștei	8	6	1	1	30	12	+18	33	
7	Victoria Avram Iancu	8	3	2	3	18	31	−13	28	
8	Viitorul Dobrești (R)	8	1	1	6	8	26	−18	24	Relegation to Liga V Bihor
9	Izvorul Cociuba Mare (R)	8	1	0	7	11	31	−20	6	Relegation to Liga V Bihor

Rules for classification: 1) Points; 2) Head-to-head points; 3) Head-to-head goal difference; 4) Head-to-head goals scored; 5) Head-to-head away goals scored; 6) Goal difference; 7) Goals scored.
(R) Relegated

=== Bistrița-Năsăud County ===
Team changes from the previous season

- Viitorul Livezile was admitted upon request.

South Series

Pos	Team	Pld	W	D	L	GF	GA	GD	Pts	Qualification or relegation
1	Atletico Monor (Q)	18	17	0	1	98	31	+67	51	Qualification to championship final
2	Săgeata Dumbrăvița	18	12	4	2	77	51	+26	40	
3	Dinamo Uriu	18	11	3	4	62	27	+35	36	
4	Voința Matei	18	8	5	5	49	36	+13	29	
5	Real Teaca	18	7	4	7	50	42	+8	25	
6	Someșul Reteag	18	6	3	9	41	49	−8	21	
7	Archiud	18	6	2	10	42	59	−17	20	
8	Sportul Beclean	18	5	1	12	36	55	−19	16	
9	Voința Mărișelu	18	4	1	13	39	77	−38	13	
10	Viitorul Budești	18	2	1	15	27	94	−67	7	

Rules for classification: 1) Points; 2) Head-to-head points; 3) Head-to-head goal difference; 4) Head-to-head goals scored; 5) Head-to-head away goals scored; 6) Goal difference; 7) Goals scored.
(Q) Qualified for the phase indicated

North Series

Pos	Team	Pld	W	D	L	GF	GA	GD	Pts	Qualification or relegation
1	Silvicultorul Maieru (Q)	18	15	1	2	85	25	+60	46	Qualification to championship final
2	Viitorul Livezile	18	14	1	3	90	27	+63	43	
3	Minerul Rodna	18	13	3	2	65	21	+44	42	
4	Progresul Năsăud	18	12	2	4	63	30	+33	38	
5	Heniu Leșu	18	10	2	6	41	40	+1	32	
6	Hebe Sângeorz-Băi	18	7	4	7	39	36	+3	25	
7	Eciro Forest Telciu	18	4	2	12	26	51	−25	14	
8	Valea Bârgăului	18	3	1	14	19	59	−40	10	
9	Someșul Feldru	18	1	2	15	31	92	−61	5	
10	Dumitra	18	1	2	15	15	93	−78	5	

Rules for classification: 1) Points; 2) Head-to-head points; 3) Head-to-head goal difference; 4) Head-to-head goals scored; 5) Head-to-head away goals scored; 6) Goal difference; 7) Goals scored.
(Q) Qualified for the phase indicated

Championship final

The championship final was played in double legs between the winners of the two series on 2 and 7 June 2024.

Team 1	Agg.	Team 2	1st leg	2nd leg
Silvicultorul Maieru	9–2	Atletico Monor	6–1	3–1

Silvicultorul Maieru won the Liga IV Bistrița-Năsăud County and qualified for the promotion play-off in Liga III.

=== Botoșani County ===
Team changes from the previous season

- Viitorul Borzești (winners) and ACS Epureni (runners-up) were promoted from Liga V Botoșani.
- Flacăra 1907 Flămânzi (13th place), Nord Star Pomârla (14th place) and Viitorul Broscăuți (15th place) were relegated to Liga V Botoșani.
- Viitorul Albești took the place of Rapid Ungureni.

Pos	Team	Pld	W	D	L	GF	GA	GD	Pts	Qualification or relegation
1	Prosport Vârfu Câmpului (C, Q)	24	20	2	2	88	21	+67	62	Qualification to promotion play-off
2	Inter Dorohoi	24	17	2	5	67	26	+41	53	
3	Bucecea	24	15	5	4	49	25	+24	50	
4	Partizanul Tudora	24	15	3	6	65	33	+32	48	
5	Viitorul Albești	24	13	5	6	62	33	+29	44	
6	Sulița	24	14	2	8	57	43	+14	41 (Note: Sulița deducted 3 points.)	
7	Unirea Curtești	24	11	7	6	54	37	+17	40	
8	Epureni	24	9	4	11	32	42	−10	31	
9	Voința Șendriceni	24	5	6	13	30	60	−30	21	
10	Sportivul Trușești	24	4	5	15	32	68	−36	17	
11	Unirea Săveni	24	5	1	18	44	94	−50	16	
12	Șoimii Bălușeni (Note: Șoimii Bălușeni withdrew after 16 rounds and lost all remaining matches with 0–3.) (R)	24	3	1	20	19	65	−46	10	Relegation to Liga V Botoșani
13	Viitorul Borzești	24	2	3	19	25	77	−52	9	
14	Unirea Stăuceni (Note: Unirea Stăuceni withdrew after 7 rounds and all its results were canceled.) (D)	0	0	0	0	0	0	0	0	Withdrew

Rules for classification: 1) Points; 2) Head-to-head points; 3) Head-to-head goal difference; 4) Head-to-head goals scored; 5) Head-to-head away goals scored; 6) Goal difference; 7) Goals scored.
(C) Champions; (D) Disqualified; (Q) Qualified for the phase indicated; (R) Relegated

=== Brașov County ===
Team changes from the previous season

- Ciucaș Tărlungeni achieved promotion to Liga III.
- Carpați Berivoi (Series I winners), Olimpic Zărnești II (Series II winners), FS Voila (Series I runners-up) and ACS Vulcan 2008 (Series II runners-up) were promoted from Liga V Brașov.
- Steagu Roșu Brașov and Prietenii Rupea withdrew.
- CSM Săcele, Colțea Brașov, AS Hărman and CSM Făgăraș were admitted upon request.

Pos	Team	Pld	W	D	L	GF	GA	GD	Pts	Qualification or relegation
1	Codlea (C, Q)	28	24	3	1	134	19	+115	75	Qualification to promotion play-off
2	Inter Cristian	28	24	1	3	114	21	+93	73	
3	Săcele	28	22	1	5	123	19	+104	67	
4	Colțea Brașov	28	15	6	7	69	37	+32	51	
5	Hărman	28	15	4	9	68	50	+18	49	
6	Făgăraș	28	14	5	9	72	47	+25	47	
7	Chimia Victoria	28	12	7	9	50	44	+6	43	
8	Aripile Brașov	28	11	6	11	66	46	+20	39	
9	Bucegi Moieciu	28	10	5	13	52	81	−29	35	
10	Olimpic Zărnești II	28	9	5	14	64	66	−2	32	
11	Hoghiz	28	8	3	17	52	91	−39	27	
12	Cetățenii Ghimbav (Note: Cetățenii Ghimbav withdrew after 14 rounds and lost all remaining matches with 0–3.)	28	8	1	19	65	69	−4	25	
13	Vulcan 2008	28	6	5	17	47	86	−39	23	
14	Voila	28	3	2	23	27	179	−152	11	
15	Carpați Berivoi	28	1	2	25	19	167	−148	5	

Rules for classification: 1) Points; 2) Head-to-head points; 3) Head-to-head goal difference; 4) Head-to-head goals scored; 5) Head-to-head away goals scored; 6) Goal difference; 7) Goals scored.
(C) Champions; (Q) Qualified for the phase indicated

=== Brăila County ===
Team changes from the previous season

- Viitorul Șuțești achieved promotion to Liga III.
- Viitorul Galbenu (Series II winners) was promoted from Liga V Brăila.
- FC Urleasca II (Series I winners) from Liga V Brăila did not have the right to promotion as a reserve team.
- Voința Vișani (10th place; withdrew) and FC Urleasca (11th place; withdrew) were relegated to Liga V Brăila.
- Dinamic Unirea withdrew.
- Suporter Club Brăila was admitted upon request.

Pos	Team	Pld	W	D	L	GF	GA	GD	Pts	Qualification or relegation
1	Viitorul Cireșu	18	18	0	0	107	8	+99	54	Qualification to championship play-off
2	Victoria Traian	18	16	0	2	84	15	+69	48	Qualification to championship play-off
3	Sportul Chiscani	18	11	1	6	77	23	+54	34	Qualification to championship play-off
4	Comunal Cazasu	18	10	1	7	48	51	−3	31	Qualification to championship play-off
5	Viitorul Galbenu	18	9	3	6	49	31	+18	30	Qualification to championship play-off
6	Daous Dava 2018 Brăila	18	9	2	7	50	35	+15	29	Qualification to championship play-off
7	Tricolorul Lanurile	18	5	1	12	25	80	−55	16	Qualification to championship play-out
8	Suporter Club Brăila	18	4	2	12	38	62	−24	14	Qualification to championship play-out
9	Viitorul Însurăței	18	3	0	15	24	94	−70	9	Qualification to championship play-out
10	Făurei	18	0	0	18	17	120	−103	0	Qualification to championship play-out

Rules for classification: 1) Points; 2) Head-to-head points; 3) Head-to-head goal difference; 4) Head-to-head goals scored; 5) Head-to-head away goals scored; 6) Goal difference; 7) Goals scored.

Championship play-off

In the championship play-off each team plays every other team twice. Teams start the play-off round with their points from the regular season halved, rounded upwards, and no other records carried over from the regular season.

Pos	Team	Pld	W	D	L	GF	GA	GD	Pts	Qualification
1	Viitorul Cireșu (C, Q)	10	9	0	1	43	8	+35	54	Qualification to promotion play-off
2	Victoria Traian	10	9	0	1	45	6	+39	51	
3	Sportul Chiscani	10	5	0	5	23	25	−2	32	
4	Daous Dava 2018 Brăila	10	4	0	6	26	24	+2	27	
5	Viitorul Galbenu	10	3	0	7	12	26	−14	24	
6	Comunal Cazasu	10	0	0	10	9	69	−60	16	

Rules for classification: 1) Points; 2) Head-to-head points; 3) Head-to-head goal difference; 4) Head-to-head goals scored; 5) Head-to-head away goals scored; 6) Goal difference; 7) Goals scored.
(C) Champions; (Q) Qualified for the phase indicated

Championship play-out

In the championship play-out each team plays every other team twice. Teams start the play-out round with their points from the regular season halved, rounded upwards, and no other records carried over from the regular season.

Pos	Team	Pld	W	D	L	GF	GA	GD	Pts	Relegation
7	Tricolorul Lanurile	6	5	0	1	25	11	+14	15	
8	Suporter Club Brăila	6	3	0	3	23	15	+8	9	
9	Viitorul Însurăței (R)	6	2	0	4	11	40	−29	6	Relegation to Liga V Brăila
10	Făurei (R)	6	2	0	4	23	16	+7	6	Relegation to Liga V Brăila

Rules for classification: 1) Points; 2) Head-to-head points; 3) Head-to-head goal difference; 4) Head-to-head goals scored; 5) Head-to-head away goals scored; 6) Goal difference; 7) Goals scored.
(R) Relegated

=== Bucharest ===
Team changes from the previous season

- Centrul German de Fotbal (winners) was promoted from Liga V Bucharest.
- Sportul D&A București II (runners-up) from Liga V Bucharest did not have the right to promotion as a reserve team.
- Pro Team București (13th place) and Turistul București (14th place) were relegated to Liga V Bucharest.
- Rapid FNG București withdrew.
- Asalt București withdrew during the previous season.
- ACS Alexandru Văidean, NFC Arena and Juniorul 2014 București were admitted upon request.

Pos	Team	Pld	W	D	L	GF	GA	GD	Pts	Qualification or relegation
1	Progresul 2005 București (Q)	26	21	4	1	107	19	+88	67	Qualification to championship play-off
2	Știința București (Q)	26	18	5	3	86	28	+58	59	Qualification to championship play-off
3	ACS FC Dinamo București (Q)	26	18	4	4	119	19	+100	58	Qualification to championship play-off
4	Daco-Getica București (Q)	26	19	0	7	97	27	+70	57	Qualification to championship play-off
5	Romprim București	26	16	2	8	60	43	+17	50	
6	Centrul German de Fotbal	26	13	1	12	60	51	+9	40	
7	Metaloglobus București II	26	12	4	10	65	63	+2	40	
8	ACP 3 Kids Sport	26	11	1	14	72	62	+10	34	
9	Venus 1914 București	26	10	3	13	62	87	−25	33	
10	Sportul D&A București	26	10	2	14	58	73	−15	32	
11	Juniorul 2014 București	26	8	2	16	46	74	−28	26	
12	Sportivii București (Note: Sportivii București withdrew after 14 rounds and lost all matches from second part of the season with 0–3.) (R)	26	7	0	19	34	79	−45	21	Relegation to Liga V Bucharest
13	NFC Arena	26	3	0	23	31	117	−86	9	
14	Alexandru Văidean (R)	26	2	0	24	24	179	−155	6	Relegation to Liga V Bucharest

Rules for classification: 1) Points; 2) Head-to-head points; 3) Head-to-head goal difference; 4) Head-to-head goals scored; 5) Head-to-head away goals scored; 6) Goal difference; 7) Goals scored.
(Q) Qualified for the phase indicated; (R) Relegated
Notes:

Championship play-off

Championship play-off played in a single round-robin tournament between the best four teams of the regular season. Depending on the place occupied in the regular season, the teams started the play-off with the following points: 1st place – 3 points, 2nd place – 2 points, 3rd place – 1 point, 4th place – 0 points. All matches were played at Romprim Stadium in Bucharest on 18, 25 May and 1 June 2024.

Pos	Team	Pld	W	D	L	GF	GA	GD	Pts	Qualification
1	ACS FC Dinamo București (C, Q)	3	3	0	0	16	4	+12	10	Qualification to promotion play-off
2	Progresul 2005 București	3	2	0	1	9	6	+3	9	
3	Știința București	3	1	0	2	6	8	−2	5	
4	Daco-Getica București	3	0	0	3	2	15	−13	0	

Rules for classification: 1) Points; 2) Head-to-head points; 3) Head-to-head goal difference; 4) Head-to-head goals scored; 5) Head-to-head away goals scored; 6) Goal difference; 7) Goals scored.
(C) Champions; (Q) Qualified for the phase indicated

=== Buzău County ===
The regular season was played in a single round-robin tournament. The first eight teams were qualify to championship play-off and the last seven teams in the championship play-out. Teams start the play-off and play-out with all the points accumulated the regular season and no other records carried over from the regular season.

Team changes from the previous season

- Recolta Sălcioara (Series III winners and promotion play-off winners) and Rapid Pârscov (Series I runners-up and promotion play-off runners-up) were promoted from Liga V Buzău.
- Phoenix Poșta Câlnău (16th place) was relegated to Liga V Buzău.
- CSM Râmnicu Sărat II withdrew.
- Progresul Beceni was spared from relegation.

Pos	Team	Pld	W	D	L	GF	GA	GD	Pts	Qualification
1	Voința Lanurile	14	13	1	0	43	12	+31	40	Qualification to championship play-off
2	Team Săgeata	14	11	0	3	46	13	+33	33	Qualification to championship play-off
3	Știința Cernătești	14	10	2	2	50	25	+25	32	Qualification to championship play-off
4	Montana Pătârlagele	14	9	1	4	43	26	+17	28	Qualification to championship play-off
5	Gloria Vadu Pașii	14	8	2	4	35	25	+10	26	Qualification to championship play-off
6	Petrolul Berca	14	7	2	5	18	16	+2	23	Qualification to championship play-off
7	Recolta Sălcioara	14	6	3	5	28	24	+4	21	Qualification to championship play-off
8	Metalul Buzău II	14	6	2	6	25	24	+1	20	Qualification to championship play-off
9	Voința Balta Albă	14	5	2	7	23	38	−15	17	Qualification to championship play-out
10	Pescărușul Luciu	14	3	4	7	22	32	−10	13	Qualification to championship play-out
11	Progresul Beceni	14	2	5	7	16	26	−10	11	Qualification to championship play-out
12	Unirea Stâlpu	14	2	5	7	17	32	−15	11	Qualification to championship play-out
13	Șoimii Siriu	14	3	2	9	14	40	−26	11	Qualification to championship play-out
14	Luceafărul Maxenu	14	2	2	10	14	36	−22	8	Qualification to championship play-out
15	Carpați Nehoiu	14	1	1	12	21	46	−25	4	Qualification to championship play-out
16	Rapid Pârscov (Note: Rapid Pârscov withdrew after 8 rounds and all its results were canceled.) (D)	0	0	0	0	0	0	0	0	Withdrew

Rules for classification: 1) Points; 2) Head-to-head points; 3) Head-to-head goal difference; 4) Head-to-head goals scored; 5) Head-to-head away goals scored; 6) Goal difference; 7) Goals scored.
(D) Disqualified
Notes:

Championship play-off

Pos	Team	Pld	W	D	L	GF	GA	GD	Pts	Qualification
1	Voința Lanurile (C, Q)	14	9	3	2	31	11	+20	70	Qualification to promotion play-off
2	Team Săgeata	14	8	1	5	26	16	+10	58	
3	CȘtiința Cernătești	14	5	4	5	27	28	−1	51	
4	Montana Pătârlagele	14	7	1	6	27	27	0	50	
5	Petrolul Berca	14	7	4	3	20	20	0	48	
6	Gloria Vadu Pașii	14	6	2	6	30	24	+6	46	
7	Metalul Buzău II	14	4	1	9	18	30	−12	33	
8	Recolta Sălcioara	14	1	2	11	11	34	−23	26	

Rules for classification: 1) Points; 2) Head-to-head points; 3) Head-to-head goal difference; 4) Head-to-head goals scored; 5) Head-to-head away goals scored; 6) Goal difference; 7) Goals scored.
(C) Champions; (Q) Qualified for the phase indicated

Championship play-out

Pos	Team	Pld	W	D	L	GF	GA	GD	Pts	Relegation
9	Pescărușul Luciu	12	8	2	2	36	19	+17	39	
10	Carpați Nehoiu	12	8	2	2	27	5	+22	30	
11	Voința Balta Albă	12	3	2	7	14	29	−15	28	
12	Unirea Stâlpu	12	4	4	4	26	23	+3	27	
13	Progresul Beceni	12	4	2	6	19	23	−4	25	
14	Șoimii Siriu	12	4	1	7	14	32	−18	24	
15	Luceafărul Maxenu (R)	12	4	1	7	21	26	−5	21	Relegation to Liga V Buzău

Rules for classification: 1) Points; 2) Head-to-head points; 3) Head-to-head goal difference; 4) Head-to-head goals scored; 5) Head-to-head away goals scored; 6) Goal difference; 7) Goals scored.
(R) Relegated

=== Caraș-Severin County ===
Team changes from the previous season

- Voința Șoșdea (winners) was promoted from Liga V Caraș-Severin.
- Progresul Ezeriș which was relegated from relegated from Liga III, withdrew.
- Voința Lupac II and Banatul Ocna de Fier withdrew.
- Rapid Buchin withdrew during the previous season.
- Foresta Armeniș was renamed Viitorul Armeniș.
- Mundo Reșița was admitted upon request.

Pos	Team	Pld	W	D	L	GF	GA	GD	Pts	Qualification or relegation
1	Magica Balta Caransebeș (C, Q)	26	22	3	1	105	20	+85	69	Qualification to promotion play-off
2	Viitorul Armeniș	26	17	2	7	73	28	+45	53	
3	Nera Bozovici	26	16	3	7	79	40	+39	51	
4	Minerul Dognecea	26	13	4	9	82	52	+30	43	
5	Nera Bogodinț	26	13	4	9	75	56	+19	43	
6	Slatina-Timiș	26	12	5	9	80	52	+28	41	
7	Anina	26	12	4	10	94	45	+49	40	
8	Bistra Glimboca	26	12	4	10	65	51	+14	40	
9	Voința Șoșdea	26	12	3	11	71	49	+22	39	
10	Oravița	26	12	2	12	72	47	+25	38	
11	Moldova Nouă	26	9	0	17	47	64	−17	27	
12	Narcisa Zervești	26	7	2	17	49	115	−66	23	
13	Oțelu Roșu	26	4	2	20	25	176	−151	14	
14	Mundo Reșița	26	2	0	24	29	151	−122	6	

Rules for classification: 1) Points; 2) Head-to-head points; 3) Head-to-head goal difference; 4) Head-to-head goals scored; 5) Head-to-head away goals scored; 6) Goal difference; 7) Goals scored.
(C) Champions; (Q) Qualified for the phase indicated

=== Călărași County ===
Team changes from the previous season

- Progresul Fundulea achieved promotion to Liga III.
- Gloria Fundeni (Series A winners), AS Gâldău (Series B winners), Dinamo Sărulești (Series A runners-up) and Zarea Cuza Vodă (Series B runners-up) were promoted from Liga V Călărași.
- Avântul Pietroiu withdrew.
- Unirea Dragalina (9th place in Series A) and Viitorul Căscioarele (9th place in Series B) were spared from relegation.
- Dinamo Sărulești was renamed Viitorul Sărulești.

Series A

Pos	Team	Pld	W	D	L	GF	GA	GD	Pts	Qualification
1	Venus Independența	18	17	0	1	88	16	+72	51	Qualification to championship play-off
2	Spicul Vâlcelele	18	14	2	2	81	15	+66	44 (Note: The match between Victoria Lehliu and Spicul Vâlcelele from the 3rd round was recorded as a double forfeit, with both teams sanctioned with a loss.)	Qualification to championship play-off
3	Dunărea Ciocănești	18	13	1	4	73	19	+54	40	Qualification to championship play-off
4	Roseți	18	10	2	6	56	28	+28	32	Qualification to championship play-off
5	Dunărea Grădiștea	18	9	4	5	48	31	+17	31	Qualification to championship play-out
6	Victoria Lehliu	18	7	1	10	32	44	−12	22	Qualification to championship play-out
7	Zarea Cuza Vodă	18	4	3	11	35	59	−24	15	Qualification to championship play-out
8	Unirea Dragalina	18	3	3	12	26	75	−49	12	Qualification to championship play-out
9	Gâldău	18	4	0	14	27	78	−51	12	Qualification to championship play-out
10	Conpet Ștefan cel Mare	18	0	0	18	8	109	−101	0	Qualification to championship play-out

Rules for classification: 1) Points; 2) Head-to-head points; 3) Head-to-head goal difference; 4) Head-to-head goals scored; 5) Head-to-head away goals scored; 6) Goal difference; 7) Goals scored.
Notes:

Series B

Pos	Team	Pld	W	D	L	GF	GA	GD	Pts	Qualification
1	Viitorul Ileana	18	18	0	0	100	5	+95	54	Qualification to championship play-off
2	Gloria Fundeni	18	12	1	5	40	20	+20	37	Qualification to championship play-off
3	Oltenița	18	11	3	4	63	21	+42	36	Qualification to championship play-off
4	Victoria Chirnogi	18	8	5	5	43	33	+10	29	Qualification to championship play-off
5	Unirea Mânăstirea	18	9	2	7	33	29	+4	29	Qualification to championship play-out
6	Steaua Radovanu	18	9	1	8	35	35	0	28	Qualification to championship play-out
7	Partizan Crivăț	18	6	1	11	33	45	−12	19	Qualification to championship play-out
8	Viitorul Sărulești	18	3	4	11	30	58	−28	13	Qualification to championship play-out
9	Viitorul Căscioarele	18	4	1	13	30	64	−34	13	Qualification to championship play-out
10	Colinele Argeșului Mitreni	18	1	0	17	22	119	−97	3	Qualification to championship play-out

Rules for classification: 1) Points; 2) Head-to-head points; 3) Head-to-head goal difference; 4) Head-to-head goals scored; 5) Head-to-head away goals scored; 6) Goal difference; 7) Goals scored.

Championship play-off
Series A

Pos	Team	Pld	W	D	L	GF	GA	GD	Pts	Qualification
1	Venus Independența (Q)	6	3	1	2	12	10	+2	36	Qualification to championship final
2	Dunărea Ciocănești	6	5	0	1	14	5	+9	35	
3	Spicul Vâlcelele	6	2	2	2	19	17	+2	30	
4	Roseți	6	0	1	5	10	23	−13	17	

Rules for classification: 1) Points; 2) Head-to-head points; 3) Head-to-head goal difference; 4) Head-to-head goals scored; 5) Head-to-head away goals scored; 6) Goal difference; 7) Goals scored.
(Q) Qualified for the phase indicated

Series B

Pos	Team	Pld	W	D	L	GF	GA	GD	Pts	Qualification
1	Viitorul Ileana (Q)	6	4	0	2	9	6	+3	39	Qualification to championship final
2	Gloria Fundeni	6	3	1	2	13	6	+7	29	
3	Oltenița	6	1	2	3	5	11	−6	23	
4	Victoria Chirnogi	6	2	1	3	4	8	−4	22	

Rules for classification: 1) Points; 2) Head-to-head points; 3) Head-to-head goal difference; 4) Head-to-head goals scored; 5) Head-to-head away goals scored; 6) Goal difference; 7) Goals scored.
(Q) Qualified for the phase indicated

Championship play-out
Series A

Pos	Team	Pld	W	D	L	GF	GA	GD	Pts	Relegation
5	Dunărea Grădiștea	5	4	0	1	23	5	+18	28	
6	Zarea Cuza Vodă	5	4	1	0	18	4	+14	21	
7	Victoria Lehliu	5	3	0	2	15	11	+4	21	
8	Unirea Dragalina	5	2	0	3	5	16	−11	12	
9	Gâldău (R)	5	1	1	3	12	13	−1	10	Relegation to Liga V Călărași
10	Conpet Ștefan cel Mare (R)	5	0	0	5	4	28	−24	0	Relegation to Liga V Călărași

Rules for classification: 1) Points; 2) Head-to-head points; 3) Head-to-head goal difference; 4) Head-to-head goals scored; 5) Head-to-head away goals scored; 6) Goal difference; 7) Goals scored.
(R) Relegated

Series B

Pos	Team	Pld	W	D	L	GF	GA	GD	Pts	Relegation
5	Unirea Mânăstirea	5	2	1	2	8	11	−3	22	
6	Viitorul Sărulești	5	4	1	0	23	9	+14	20	
7	Steaua Radovanu	5	2	0	3	13	13	0	20	
8	Partizan Crivăț	5	3	0	2	20	15	+5	19	
9	Viitorul Căscioarele (R)	5	1	1	3	13	17	−4	11	Relegation to Liga V Călărași
10	Colinele Argeșului Mitreni (R)	5	1	1	3	8	20	−12	6	Relegation to Liga V Călărași

Rules for classification: 1) Points; 2) Head-to-head points; 3) Head-to-head goal difference; 4) Head-to-head goals scored; 5) Head-to-head away goals scored; 6) Goal difference; 7) Goals scored.
(R) Relegated

Championship final

The championship final was played on 8 June 2024 at Comunal Stadium in Chirnogi.

Team 1	Score	Team 2
Viitorul Ileana	2–3	Venus Independența

Venus Independența won the Liga IV Călărași County and qualified for the promotion play-off in Liga III.

=== Cluj County ===
Team changes from the previous season

- Șoimii Câmpia Turzii (Câmpia Turzii Zone Cluj winners), Viitorul Poieni (Cluj Zone winners), Energia Mănăstirea (Dej Zone winners), Înfrățirea Livada (Gherla Zone winners) and Luceafărul Ghirișu Român (Mociu Zone winners) declined promotion from Liga V Cluj.
- Unirea Tritenii de Jos and Academia Florești withdrew.
- Sănătatea Cluj II and ACS Iara were admitted upon request.

Pos	Team	Pld	W	D	L	GF	GA	GD	Pts	Qualification or relegation
1	Vulturul Mintiu Gherlii (C, Q)	22	18	1	3	82	20	+62	55	Qualification for the promotion play-off
2	Victoria Viișoara	22	17	3	2	100	21	+79	54	
3	Viitorul Mihai Georgescu	22	17	1	4	91	24	+67	52	
4	Sticla Arieșul Turda	22	15	2	5	83	23	+60	47	
5	Arieșul Mihai Viteazu	22	12	2	8	64	43	+21	38	
6	Atletic Olimpia Gherla	22	11	3	8	39	32	+7	36	
7	Unirea Iclod	22	10	1	11	45	55	−10	31	
8	Viitorul Gârbău	22	6	4	12	29	76	−47	22	
9	Sănătatea Cluj II	22	6	3	13	45	70	−25	21	
10	Speranța Jucu	21	4	1	16	15	60	−45	13 (Note: Speranța Jucu and Minerul Ocna Dej II withdrew after first part of the season and lost all remaining matches with 0–3.)	
11	Iara	22	2	1	19	19	114	−95	7	
12	Minerul Ocna Dej II	21	2	0	19	8	82	−74	6	

Rules for classification: 1) Points; 2) Head-to-head points; 3) Head-to-head goal difference; 4) Head-to-head goals scored; 5) Head-to-head away goals scored; 6) Goal difference; 7) Goals scored.
(C) Champions; (Q) Qualified for the phase indicated

=== Constanța County ===
Team changes from the previous season

- Axiopolis Cernavodă achieved promotion to Liga III.
- CS Eforie (South Series winners) and Danubius Rasova (West Series winners) were promoted from Liga V Constanța.
- CS Peștera (North Series winners) declined promotion from Liga V Constanța.
- Șoimii Topraisar (17th place) was relegated to Liga V Constanța.
- Știința ACALAB Poarta AlbăȘtiința ACALAB Poarta Albă (18th place) was spared from relegation.

Pos	Team	Pld	W	D	L	GF	GA	GD	Pts	Qualification or relegation
1	Medgidia (C, Q)	34	27	4	3	114	27	+87	85	Qualification to promotion play-off
2	Sparta Techirghiol	34	25	8	1	117	36	+81	83	
3	Agigea	34	24	9	1	125	39	+86	81	
4	Viitorul Cobadin	34	20	8	6	75	33	+42	68	
5	Năvodari	34	20	5	9	91	53	+38	65	
6	Poseidon Limanu	34	20	4	10	117	62	+55	64	
7	Viitorul Hârșova	34	20	2	12	77	46	+31	62	
8	Danubius Rasova	34	15	8	11	75	52	+23	53	
9	Murfatlar	34	16	3	15	64	69	−5	51	
10	Portul Constanța	34	15	4	15	94	68	+26	49	
11	Victoria Cumpăna	34	15	4	15	71	72	−1	49	
12	Ovidiu	34	13	6	15	71	69	+2	45	
13	Lumina	34	10	4	20	82	100	−18	34	
14	Mihail Kogălniceanu	34	8	5	21	78	106	−28	29	
15	Știința ACALAB Poarta Albă	34	5	5	24	44	125	−81	20	
16	Farul Tuzla (R)	34	5	1	28	46	158	−112	16	Relegation to Liga V Constanța
17	Viitorul Pecineaga (R)	34	3	2	29	40	142	−102	11	Relegation to Liga V Constanța
18	Eforie (R)	34	1	6	27	32	156	−124	9	Relegation to Liga V Constanța

Rules for classification: 1) Points; 2) Head-to-head points; 3) Head-to-head goal difference; 4) Head-to-head goals scored; 5) Head-to-head away goals scored; 6) Goal difference; 7) Goals scored.
(C) Champions; (Q) Qualified for the phase indicated; (R) Relegated

=== Covasna County ===
Team changes from the previous season

- FC Brețcu and ATSC Reci withdrew.
- Venus Ozun, FC Moacșa and Ciucaș Întorsura Buzăului were admitted upon request.

Pos	Team	Pld	W	D	L	GF	GA	GD	Pts	Qualification or relegation
1	Prima Brăduț (C, Q)	28	27	1	0	139	20	+119	82	Qualification to promotion play-off
2	Baraolt	28	22	2	4	138	26	+112	68	
3	Covasna	28	22	1	5	115	30	+85	67	
4	Stăruința Zagon	28	21	0	7	90	30	+60	63	
5	Arcuș	28	17	4	7	115	47	+68	55	
6	Progresul Sita Buzăului	28	17	3	8	90	52	+38	54	
7	Perkö Sânzieni	28	15	4	9	77	42	+35	49	
8	Nemere Ghelința	28	9	5	14	42	69	−27	32	
9	Păpăuți	28	9	3	16	56	87	−31	30	
10	Harghita Aita Mare	28	8	5	15	41	72	−31	29	
11	Cernat	28	7	4	17	37	111	−74	25	
12	Moacșa	28	5	3	20	35	117	−82	18	
13	Venus Ozun	28	4	2	22	42	127	−85	14	
14	Catalina	28	3	5	20	29	110	−81	14	
15	Ciucaș Întorsura Buzăului	28	2	2	24	21	127	−106	8	

Rules for classification: 1) Points; 2) Head-to-head points; 3) Head-to-head goal difference; 4) Head-to-head goals scored; 5) Head-to-head away goals scored; 6) Goal difference; 7) Goals scored.
(C) Champions; (Q) Qualified for the phase indicated

=== Dâmbovița County ===
Team changes from the previous season

- Viitorul Ocnița (North Series winners), Săgeata Braniștea (South Series winners), Voința Tătărani (North Series runners-up and promotion/relegation play-off winners) and Libertatea Urziceanca (South Series runners-up and promotion/relegation play-off winners) were promoted from Liga V Dâmbovița
- Voința Crețu (13th place and promotion/relegation play-off losers), Gloria Bucșani (14th place and promotion/relegation play-off losers), Steagu Roșu Colacu (15th place) and Unirea Ungureni (16th place) were relegated to Liga V Dâmbovița.

Pos	Team	Pld	W	D	L	GF	GA	GD	Pts	Qualification or relegation
1	Urban Titu (C, Q)	30	25	4	1	135	17	+118	79	Qualification to promotion play-off
2	Recolta Gura Șuții	30	23	4	3	127	38	+89	73	
3	Roberto Ziduri	30	20	5	5	95	45	+50	62 (Note: Roberto Ziduri deducted 3 points.)	
4	1976 Potlogi	30	16	7	7	92	53	+39	55	
5	Viitorul Voinești	30	14	6	10	56	52	+4	48	
6	Burduca	30	14	4	12	55	50	+5	46	
7	Libertatea Urziceanca	30	12	10	8	62	58	+4	46	
8	Săgeata Braniștea	30	11	7	12	64	62	+2	40	
9	Fieni	30	12	3	15	54	74	−20	39	
10	Flacăra Șuța Seacă	30	10	8	12	65	71	−6	38	
11	Străjerii Răzvad	30	10	4	16	51	72	−21	34	
12	Bradul Moroeni	30	8	5	17	60	82	−22	29	
13	1948 Brezoaele	30	7	4	19	71	101	−30	25	
14	Unirea Bucșani (O)	30	7	4	19	49	113	−64	25	Qualification to relegation play-out
15	Voința Tătărani (R)	30	6	6	18	42	102	−60	24	Qualification to relegation play-out
16	Viitorul Ocnița (R)	30	4	1	25	33	121	−88	13	Relegation to Liga V Dâmbovița

Rules for classification: 1) Points; 2) Head-to-head points; 3) Head-to-head goal difference; 4) Head-to-head goals scored; 5) Head-to-head away goals scored; 6) Goal difference; 7) Goals scored.
(C) Champions; (O) Play-off winners; (Q) Qualified for the phase indicated; (R) Relegated
Notes:

Relegation play-out

The 14th and 15th-placed teams of the Liga IV faces the 2nd-placed teams of the two series of Liga V Dâmbovița – County. The matches were played on 16 and 25 June 2024.

Team 1	Score	Team 2
Dragomirești	2–5	Unirea Bucșani
Lungulețu	6–2	Voința Tătărani

=== Dolj County ===
Team changes from the previous season

- FCU 1948 Craiova II achieved promotion to Liga III.
- Viitorul Măceșu de Sus (16th place) was relegated to Liga V Dolj.
- Viitorul Știința Craiova (Series III winners) and RFG Melinești (Series IV winners) were promoted from Liga V Dolj.
- Recolta Măceșu de Jos (Series I winners) and Unirea Tâmburești (Series II winners) declined promotion from Liga V Dolj.
- Știința Celaru (14th place) and Flacăra Moțăței (15th place) were spared from relegation.
- ACS Galicea Mare withdrew and was replaced by Tineretul Poiana Mare.

Pos	Team	Pld	W	D	L	GF	GA	GD	Pts	Qualification or relegation
1	Metropolitan Ișalnița (C, Q)	30	24	3	3	89	28	+61	75	Qualification to promotion play-off
2	Tractorul Cetate	30	22	3	5	116	50	+66	69	
3	Cârcea	30	21	2	7	102	39	+63	65	
4	Avântul Pielești	30	19	5	6	103	37	+66	62	
5	Unirea Amărăștii de Jos	30	16	6	8	53	35	+18	54	
6	Unirea Tricolor Dăbuleni	30	15	4	11	84	68	+16	49	
7	RFG Melinești	30	14	5	11	69	49	+20	47	
8	Știința Danubius Bechet	30	11	8	11	71	62	+9	41	
9	Viitorul Știința Craiova	30	12	4	14	66	57	+9	40	
10	Dunărea Calafat	30	11	7	12	61	77	−16	40	
11	Progresul Băilești	30	10	8	12	66	76	−10	38	
12	Știința Cerăt	30	10	6	14	67	70	−3	36	
13	Știința Celaru	30	8	4	18	74	111	−37	28	
14	Progresul Segarcea	30	4	3	23	43	106	−63	15	
15	Flacăra Moțăței	30	4	2	24	35	142	−107	14	
16	Tineretul Poiana Mare	30	2	4	24	26	118	−92	10	

Rules for classification: 1) Points; 2) Head-to-head points; 3) Head-to-head goal difference; 4) Head-to-head goals scored; 5) Head-to-head away goals scored; 6) Goal difference; 7) Goals scored.
(C) Champions; (Q) Qualified for the phase indicated

=== Galați County ===
Team changes from the previous season

- Șoimii Foltești (winners) was promoted from Liga V Galați.
- Luceafărul Bereşti withdrew.
- Progresul Munteni was admitted upon request.

Pos	Team	Pld	W	D	L	GF	GA	GD	Pts	Qualification or relegation
1	Voința Cudalbi (C, Q)	24	21	2	1	93	29	+64	65	Qualification to promotion play-off
2	Covurluiul 2021 Târgu Bujor	24	20	2	2	96	19	+77	62	
3	Alegria JS Matca	24	18	4	2	73	23	+50	58	
4	Siretul Cosmești	24	13	2	9	58	43	+15	41	
5	Gloria Ivești	24	13	1	10	83	47	+36	40	
6	Viitorul Umbrărești	24	9	4	11	55	57	−2	31	
7	Victoria Independența	24	9	4	11	45	61	−16	31	
8	Lascăr Schela	24	8	6	10	57	64	−7	30	
9	Agrostar Tulucești	24	7	6	11	64	88	−24	27	
10	Muncitorul Ghidigeni	24	7	1	16	46	70	−24	22	
11	Șoimii Foltești	24	4	6	14	34	88	−54	18	
12	Progresul Munteni	24	3	4	17	45	74	−29	13	
13	Avântul Drăgănești	24	2	2	20	27	113	−86	8	

Rules for classification: 1) Points; 2) Head-to-head points; 3) Head-to-head goal difference; 4) Head-to-head goals scored; 5) Head-to-head away goals scored; 6) Goal difference; 7) Goals scored.
(C) Champions; (Q) Qualified for the phase indicated

=== Giurgiu County ===
The Liga IV Giurgiu County was played in two stages, with a regular season split into two series of twelve teams each, followed by a championship play-off and play-out. The play-off will feature the top four teams from each series in a double round-robin format, with teams starting from 3, 2, 1, and 0 points based on their final ranking in the regular season. The play-out will include the teams ranked 5th to 12th in each series, also in a double round-robin format, with teams remaining within their respective series and starting with all points accumulated in the regular season. The bottom two teams from each series will be relegated to Liga V – Giurgiu County.

Team changes from the previous season

- Dunărea Giurgiu achieved promotion to Liga III
- VLD Șoimii Ghizdaru (South A Series runners-up), Dunărea Găujani (South A Series 3rd place), AXI Adunații-Copăceni (South B Series winners), Omerta Stoenești (South B Series runners-up) and AS Podu Doamnei (North B Series runners-up) were promoted from Liga V Giurgiu.
- Unirea Slobozia (South A Series winners), CS Buturugeni (North A Series winners), Real Drăgăneasca (North A Series runners-up) and Tineretul Vadu Lat (North B Series winners) declined promotion from Liga V Giurgiu.
- Unirea Izvoarele (South Series 11th place) and AS Iepurești (North Series 11th place) were relegated to Liga V Giurgiu.
- Viitorul Tântava was renamed AFC Tântava.

South Series

Pos	Team	Pld	W	D	L	GF	GA	GD	Pts	Qualification or relegation
1	AXI Adunații-Copăceni	10	10	0	0	70	9	+61	30	Qualification to championship play-off
2	Dunărea Găujani	10	8	0	2	54	14	+40	24	Qualification to championship play-off
3	Victoria Adunații-Copăceni	10	8	0	2	62	8	+54	24	Qualification to championship play-off
4	Energia Remuș	10	7	0	3	39	19	+20	21	Qualification to championship play-off
5	Gloria Comana	10	5	1	4	29	23	+6	16	Qualification to championship play-out
6	Inter Valea Dragului	10	5	1	4	29	47	−18	16	Qualification to championship play-out
7	Viitorul Vedea	10	3	2	5	25	34	−9	11	Qualification to championship play-out
8	Dunărea Oinacu	10	3	0	7	23	37	−14	9	Qualification to championship play-out
9	Real Colibași	10	2	2	6	17	31	−14	8	Qualification to championship play-out
10	Mihai Viteazul Călugăreni	10	1	0	9	21	59	−38	3	Qualification to championship play-out
11	Giganții Vărăști	10	0	0	10	12	100	−88	0	Qualification to championship play-out
12	VLD Șoimii Ghizdaru (Note: VLD Șoimii Ghizdaru excluded after 7 rounds and all its results were canceled.) (D)	0	0	0	0	0	0	0	0	Excluded

Rules for classification: 1) Points; 2) Head-to-head points; 3) Head-to-head goal difference; 4) Head-to-head goals scored; 5) Head-to-head away goals scored; 6) Goal difference; 7) Goals scored.
(D) Disqualified
Notes:

North Series

Pos	Team	Pld	W	D	L	GF	GA	GD	Pts	Qualification or relegation
1	Tântava	11	10	0	1	55	12	+43	30	Qualification to championship play-off
2	Bolintin Malu Spart	11	9	1	1	62	16	+46	28	Qualification to championship play-off
3	Luceafărul Trestieni	11	8	2	1	37	15	+22	26	Qualification to championship play-off
4	Avântul Florești	11	7	1	3	26	19	+7	22	Qualification to championship play-off
5	Zmeii Ogrezeni	11	5	2	4	27	29	−2	17	Qualification to championship play-out
6	Singureni	11	5	2	4	31	29	+2	17	Qualification to championship play-out
7	Podu Doamnei	11	4	1	6	24	27	−3	13	Qualification to championship play-out
8	Silver Inter Zorile	11	4	0	7	23	32	−9	12	Qualification to championship play-out
9	Bolintin-Deal	11	4	0	7	18	41	−23	12	Qualification to championship play-out
10	Maxima Hobaia	11	3	1	7	21	42	−21	10	Qualification to championship play-out
11	Petrolul Roata de Jos	11	1	2	8	19	36	−17	5	Qualification to championship play-out
12	Omerta Stoenești	11	0	0	11	11	56	−45	−2 (Note: Omerta Stoenești deducted 2 points.)	Qualification to championship play-out

Rules for classification: 1) Points; 2) Head-to-head points; 3) Head-to-head goal difference; 4) Head-to-head goals scored; 5) Head-to-head away goals scored; 6) Goal difference; 7) Goals scored.
Notes:

Championship play-off

Pos	Team	Pld	W	D	L	GF	GA	GD	Pts	Qualification or relegation
1	Bolintin Malu Spart (C, Q)	14	11	1	2	43	18	+25	36	Qualification to promotion play-off
2	Victoria Adunații-Copăceni	14	9	2	3	36	24	+12	30	
3	AXI Adunații-Copăceni	14	8	2	4	52	19	+33	29	
4	Tântava	14	8	0	6	30	33	−3	27	
5	Dunărea Găujani	14	6	3	5	28	28	0	23	
6	Avântul Florești	14	4	3	7	28	24	+4	15	
7	Luceafărul Trestieni	14	3	1	10	18	37	−19	11	
8	Energia Remuș	14	1	0	13	19	71	−52	3	

Rules for classification: 1) Points; 2) Head-to-head points; 3) Head-to-head goal difference; 4) Head-to-head goals scored; 5) Head-to-head away goals scored; 6) Goal difference; 7) Goals scored.
(C) Champions; (Q) Qualified for the phase indicated

Championship play-out
South Series

Pos	Team	Pld	W	D	L	GF	GA	GD	Pts	Relegation
9	Gloria Comana	12	9	2	1	56	26	+30	45	
10	Dunărea Oinacu	12	7	0	5	32	24	+8	30	
11	Real Colibași	12	6	1	5	41	19	+22	27	
12	Inter Valea Dragului	12	3	1	8	21	53	−32	26	
13	Giganții Vărăști	12	7	1	4	39	25	+14	22	
14	Mihai Viteazul Călugăreni	12	5	1	6	27	35	−8	19	
15	Viitorul Vedea (R)	12	1	2	9	22	56	−34	16	Relegation to Liga V Giurgiu
16	VLD Șoimii Ghizdaru (Note: VLD Șoimii Ghizdaru excluded after 7 rounds in the regular season.) (D)	0	0	0	0	0	0	0	0	Excluded

Rules for classification: 1) Points; 2) Head-to-head points; 3) Head-to-head goal difference; 4) Head-to-head goals scored; 5) Head-to-head away goals scored; 6) Goal difference; 7) Goals scored.
(D) Disqualified; (R) Relegated
Notes:

North Series

Pos	Team	Pld	W	D	L	GF	GA	GD	Pts	Relegation
9	Podu Doamnei	14	9	2	3	48	26	+22	42	
10	Singureni	14	7	2	5	51	29	+22	40	
11	Silver Inter Zorile	14	9	0	5	37	21	+16	39	
12	Zmeii Ogrezeni	14	7	1	6	48	50	−2	39	
13	Bolintin-Deal	14	8	1	5	38	33	+5	37	
14	Maxima Hobaia	14	6	0	8	34	49	−15	28	
15	Petrolul Roata de Jos (R)	14	6	1	7	32	37	−5	24	Relegation to Liga V Giurgiu
16	Omerta Stoenești (Note: Omerta Stoenești withdrew after 7 rounds and lost all remaining matches with 0–3.) (R)	14	0	1	13	10	53	−43	−1 (Note: Omerta Stoenești deducted 2 points in the regular season.)	Relegation to Liga V Giurgiu

Rules for classification: 1) Points; 2) Head-to-head points; 3) Head-to-head goal difference; 4) Head-to-head goals scored; 5) Head-to-head away goals scored; 6) Goal difference; 7) Goals scored.
(R) Relegated

=== Gorj County ===
Team changes from the previous season

- CSO Turceni achieved promotion to Liga III.
- Energetica Tismana (Series I winners) was promoted from Liga V Gorj.
- CSC Dănești (Series II winners) declined promotion from Liga V Gorj.
- Pandurii Târgu Jiu withdrew during the previous season.
- Parângul Bumbești-Jiu and Petrolul Bustuchin were admitted upon request.
- Viitorul Negomir was renamed CSC Negomir.
- Energetica Tismana was renamed CSO Tismana.
- Minerul II Mătăsari was renamed Minerul Mătăsari.

Pos	Team	Pld	W	D	L	GF	GA	GD	Pts	Qualification
1	Vulturii Fărcășești (C, Q)	26	23	1	2	104	17	+87	70	Qualification to promotion play-off
2	Jiul Rovinari	26	18	5	3	70	22	+48	59	
3	Negomir	26	16	4	6	66	39	+27	52	
4	Internațional Bălești	26	16	1	9	62	41	+21	49	
5	Gilortul Târgu Cărbunești II	26	14	3	9	66	59	+7	45	
6	Petrolul Țicleni	26	12	7	7	50	39	+11	43	
7	Unirea Țânțăreni	26	13	2	11	63	52	+11	41	
8	Minerul Motru	26	11	6	9	37	35	+2	39	
9	Minerul Mătăsari	26	8	6	12	28	43	−15	30	
10	Petrolul Stoina	26	7	6	13	47	58	−11	27	
11	Jupânești	26	7	2	17	41	94	−53	23	
12	Petrolul Bustuchin	26	6	2	18	44	76	−32	20	
13	Tismana	26	4	5	17	32	61	−29	17	
14	Parângul Bumbești-Jiu	26	1	2	23	24	98	−74	5	

Rules for classification: 1) Points; 2) Head-to-head points; 3) Head-to-head goal difference; 4) Head-to-head goals scored; 5) Head-to-head away goals scored; 6) Goal difference; 7) Goals scored.
(C) Champions; (Q) Qualified for the phase indicated

=== Harghita County ===
The Liga IV Harghita County was played in a double round-robin regular season, followed by a play-off for the top four teams in a double round-robin format, starting with half of their points, rounded up, and a play-out for the bottom six teams in a single round-robin format, with teams starting with all records accumulated in the regular season.

Team changes from the previous season

- Bastya Lăzarea (11th place) was relegated to Liga V Harghita.
- Andycom Avrămești (Odorhei Zone Group A winners), Farkaslaka Lupeni (Odorhei Zone Group B winners) and ACS Sândominic (Ciuc Zone winners) declined promotion from Liga V Harghita.

Pos	Team	Pld	W	D	L	GF	GA	GD	Pts	Qualification or relegation
1	Gheorgheni	18	15	1	2	108	22	+86	46	Qualification to championship play-off
2	Agyagfalvi Lendület Lutița	18	12	4	2	36	15	+21	40	Qualification to championship play-off
3	Sânsimion	18	12	2	4	50	25	+25	38	Qualification to championship play-off
4	Golimpiakosz Odorheiu Secuiesc	18	9	3	6	30	34	−4	30	Qualification to championship play-off
5	Roseal Odorheiu Secuiesc	18	9	2	7	53	36	+17	29	Qualification to championship play-out
6	Minerul Bălan	18	9	1	8	41	61	−20	28	Qualification to championship play-out
7	Unirea Cristuru Secuiesc	18	6	2	10	30	44	−14	20	Qualification to championship play-out
8	Bradul Zetea	18	3	5	10	48	47	+1	14	Qualification to championship play-out
9	Ezüstfenyő Ciceu	18	3	0	15	17	61	−44	9	Qualification to championship play-out
10	Homorod Merești	18	1	2	15	21	89	−68	5	Qualification to championship play-out

Rules for classification: 1) Points; 2) Head-to-head points; 3) Head-to-head goal difference; 4) Head-to-head goals scored; 5) Head-to-head away goals scored; 6) Goal difference; 7) Goals scored.

Championship play-off

Pos	Team	Pld	W	D	L	GF	GA	GD	Pts	Qualification
1	Gheorgheni (C, Q)	6	6	0	0	36	4	+32	41	Qualification to promotion play-off
2	Sânsimion	6	3	1	2	10	11	−1	29	
3	Agyagfalvi Lendület Lutița	6	1	1	4	7	23	−16	24	
4	Golimpiakosz Odorheiu Secuiesc	6	1	0	5	5	20	−15	18	

Rules for classification: 1) Points; 2) Head-to-head points; 3) Head-to-head goal difference; 4) Head-to-head goals scored; 5) Head-to-head away goals scored; 6) Goal difference; 7) Goals scored.
(C) Champions; (Q) Qualified for the phase indicated

Championship play-out

Pos	Team	Pld	W	D	L	GF	GA	GD	Pts
5	Roseal Odorheiu Secuiesc	5	4	0	1	18	4	+14	41
6	Minerul Bălan	5	3	0	2	12	13	−1	37
7	Unirea Cristuru Secuiesc	5	4	0	1	17	8	+9	32
8	Bradul Zetea	5	2	0	3	13	16	−3	20
9	Homorod Merești	5	2	0	3	14	21	−7	11
10	Ezüstfenyő Ciceu	5	0	0	5	7	19	−12	9

Rules for classification: 1) Points; 2) Head-to-head points; 3) Head-to-head goal difference; 4) Head-to-head goals scored; 5) Head-to-head away goals scored; 6) Goal difference; 7) Goals scored.

=== Hunedoara County ===
The Liga IV Hunedoara County was played in a double round-robin regular season, followed by a Final Four stage for the top teams and a play-out for the remaining teams. The Final Four stage was contested in a double round-robin format, while the play-out was contested in a single round-robin format, with each team starting both stages with half of their regular season points, rounded up, with no other records carried over.

Team changes from the previous season

- Retezatul Hațeg and Aurul Brad were relegated from Liga III.
- CSC Sântămăria-Orlea (winners) was promoted from Liga V Hunedoara.
- Viitorul Șoimuș (12th place) was relegated to Liga V Hunedoara.
- Corvinul Hunedoara II withdrew.
- Viitorul Minerul Lupeni was renamed Minerul Lupeni during the season.

Pos	Team	Pld	W	D	L	GF	GA	GD	Pts	Qualification
1	Aurul Brad	22	18	3	1	109	29	+80	57	Qualification to final four
2	Viitorul Minerul Lupeni	22	17	3	2	78	17	+61	54	Qualification to final four
3	Gloria Geoagiu	22	14	4	4	81	33	+48	46	Qualification to final four
4	Sântămăria-Orlea	22	13	5	4	73	33	+40	44	Qualification to final four
5	Deva II	22	10	5	7	55	54	+1	35	Qualification to championship play-out
6	Retezatul Hațeg	22	10	3	9	59	35	+24	33	Qualification to championship play-out
7	Dacia Orăștie	22	9	5	8	45	40	+5	32	Qualification to championship play-out
8	Șoimul Băița	22	5	6	11	38	61	−23	21	Qualification to championship play-out
9	Mihai Viteazu Vulcan	22	5	5	12	31	51	−20	20	Qualification to championship play-out
10	Inter Petrila	22	5	2	15	33	62	−29	17	Qualification to championship play-out
11	Victoria Călan	22	4	2	16	22	90	−68	14	Qualification to championship play-out
12	Minerul Uricani	22	0	1	21	10	129	−119	1	Qualification to championship play-out

Rules for classification: 1) Points; 2) Head-to-head points; 3) Head-to-head goal difference; 4) Head-to-head goals scored; 5) Head-to-head away goals scored; 6) Goal difference; 7) Goals scored.

Championship play-off
Final four

Pos	Team	Pld	W	D	L	GF	GA	GD	Pts	Qualification
1	Minerul Lupeni (C, Q)	6	5	1	0	13	1	+12	43	Qualification to promotion play-off
2	Aurul Brad	6	3	1	2	9	5	+4	39	
3	Gloria Geoagiu	6	3	0	3	6	6	0	32	
4	Sântămăria-Orlea	6	0	0	6	1	17	−16	22	

Rules for classification: 1) Points; 2) Head-to-head points; 3) Head-to-head goal difference; 4) Head-to-head goals scored; 5) Head-to-head away goals scored; 6) Goal difference; 7) Goals scored.
(C) Champions; (Q) Qualified for the phase indicated

Championship play-out

Pos	Team	Pld	W	D	L	GF	GA	GD	Pts
5	Retezatul Hațeg	7	7	0	0	32	5	+27	38
6	Dacia Orăștie	7	4	1	2	20	8	+12	29
7	Deva II	7	2	1	4	13	26	−13	25
8	Șoimul Băița	7	4	0	3	14	16	−2	21
9	Inter Petrila	7	4	0	3	24	11	+13	21
10	Mihai Viteazu Vulcan	7	3	2	2	13	9	+4	21
11	Victoria Călan	7	2	0	5	20	18	+2	13
12	Minerul Uricani	7	0	0	7	4	47	−43	1

Rules for classification: 1) Points; 2) Head-to-head points; 3) Head-to-head goal difference; 4) Head-to-head goals scored; 5) Head-to-head away goals scored; 6) Goal difference; 7) Goals scored.

=== Ialomița County ===
The Liga IV Ialomița County was played over two series in a double round-robin format, followed by a play-off and play-out. The top four teams from each series advanced to the play-off, while the others entered the play-out. The play-off was contested in a double round-robin format and the play-out in a single round-robin, with teams starting both stages with their points halved and rounded up.

Team changes from the previous season

- CS Amara was relegated from Liga III.
- Junior Țăndărei (East Series winners), Unirea Grivița (Center Series winners) and Stăruința Broșteni (West Series winners) were promoted from Liga V Ialomița.
- Recolta Gheorghe Lazăr (18th place), AS Coșereni (19th place) and AS Căzănești (20th place) were relegated to Liga V Ialomița.
- Bărăganul Ciulnița withdrew.
- Viitorul Axintele was renamed during the season CS Axintele.

East Series

Pos	Team	Pld	W	D	L	GF	GA	GD	Pts	Qualification
1	Fetești	18	18	0	0	83	4	+79	54	Qualification to championship play-off
2	Amara	18	14	0	4	63	19	+44	42	Qualification to championship play-off
3	Abatorul Slobozia	18	11	0	7	51	42	+9	33	Qualification to championship play-off
4	Victoria Țăndărei	18	9	3	6	38	30	+8	30	Qualification to championship play-off
5	Unirea Grivița	18	8	4	6	35	48	−13	28	Qualification to championship play-out
6	Iazu	18	7	3	8	45	49	−4	24	Qualification to championship play-out
7	Albești 08	18	6	1	11	34	50	−16	19	Qualification to championship play-out
8	Unirea Scânteia	18	4	4	10	32	66	−34	16	Qualification to championship play-out
9	Junior Țăndărei	18	3	0	15	25	66	−41	9	Qualification to championship play-out
10	Real Cosâmbești	18	2	1	15	19	51	−32	7	Qualification to championship play-out

Rules for classification: 1) Points; 2) Head-to-head points; 3) Head-to-head goal difference; 4) Head-to-head goals scored; 5) Head-to-head away goals scored; 6) Goal difference; 7) Goals scored.

West Series

Pos	Team	Pld	W	D	L	GF	GA	GD	Pts	Qualification
1	Rovine	18	15	3	0	81	20	+61	48	Qualification to championship play-off
2	Înfrățirea Jilavele	18	11	4	3	46	30	+16	37	Qualification to championship play-off
3	Urziceni	18	10	4	4	38	17	+21	34	Qualification to championship play-off
4	Recolta Bărcănești	18	8	6	4	37	29	+8	30	Qualification to championship play-off
5	Viitorul Axintele	18	8	4	6	51	27	+24	28	Qualification to championship play-out
6	Victoria Munteni-Buzău	18	7	3	8	45	33	+12	24	Qualification to championship play-out
7	Stăruința Broșteni	18	5	4	9	34	45	−11	19	Qualification to championship play-out
8	Secunda Adâncata	18	4	3	11	19	66	−47	15	Qualification to championship play-out
9	Victoria Roșiori	18	4	1	13	37	65	−28	13	Qualification to championship play-out
10	Unirea Ion Roată	18	0	4	14	8	64	−56	4	Qualification to championship play-out

Rules for classification: 1) Points; 2) Head-to-head points; 3) Head-to-head goal difference; 4) Head-to-head goals scored; 5) Head-to-head away goals scored; 6) Goal difference; 7) Goals scored.

Championship play-off

Pos	Team	Pld	W	D	L	GF	GA	GD	Pts	Qualification
1	Fetești (C, Q)	14	10	1	3	47	23	+24	58	Qualification to promotion play-off
2	Rovine	14	10	2	2	51	17	+34	56	
3	Amara	14	6	2	6	25	29	−4	42	
4	Urziceni	14	8	0	6	27	34	−7	41	
5	Recolta Bărcănești	14	6	4	4	32	27	+5	37	
6	Înfrățirea Jilavele	14	4	0	10	24	39	−15	31	
7	Victoria Țăndărei	14	3	3	8	24	29	−5	27	
8	Abatorul Slobozia	14	3	0	11	34	66	−32	26	

Rules for classification: 1) Points; 2) Head-to-head points; 3) Head-to-head goal difference; 4) Head-to-head goals scored; 5) Head-to-head away goals scored; 6) Goal difference; 7) Goals scored.
(C) Champions; (Q) Qualified for the phase indicated

Championship play-out

Pos	Team	Pld	W	D	L	GF	GA	GD	Pts	Relegation
9	Stăruința Broșteni	11	10	1	0	38	12	+26	41	
10	Axintele	11	7	2	2	35	7	+28	37	
11	Iazu	11	6	1	4	52	20	+32	31	
12	Unirea Grivița	11	5	1	5	31	29	+2	30	
13	Victoria Munteni-Buzău	11	5	2	4	29	24	+5	29	
14	Secunda Adâncata	11	5	2	4	30	24	+6	25	
15	Junior Țăndărei	11	6	3	2	34	12	+22	24 (Note: Junior Țăndărei deducted 2 points.)	
16	Real Cosâmbești	11	6	2	3	37	23	+14	24	
17	Victoria Roșiori (R)	11	4	1	6	17	37	−20	20	Relegation to Liga V Ialomița
18	Unirea Scânteia (R)	11	2	2	7	16	38	−22	16	Relegation to Liga V Ialomița
19	Albești 08 (R)	11	1	0	10	12	65	−53	13	Relegation to Liga V Ialomița
20	Unirea Ion Roată (R)	11	0	1	10	12	52	−40	3	Relegation to Liga V Ialomița

Rules for classification: 1) Points; 2) Head-to-head points; 3) Head-to-head goal difference; 4) Head-to-head goals scored; 5) Head-to-head away goals scored; 6) Goal difference; 7) Goals scored.
(R) Relegated

=== Iași County ===
Team changes from the previous season

- Tonmir Iași (Series I winners), Victoria Lețcani (Series I runners-up) and Unirea Alexandru Ioan Cuza (Series II runners-up) were promoted from Liga V Iași.
- Voința Moțca (Series II winners) declined promotion from Liga V Iași.
- CS Tomești (14th place), Progresul Deleni (15th place) and Spicul Heleșteni (16th place) were relegated to Liga V Iași.

Pos	Team	Pld	W	D	L	GF	GA	GD	Pts	Qualification or relegation
1	USV Iași (C, Q)	30	24	4	2	100	32	+68	76 (Note: USV Iași are ahead of Pașcani on Head-to-head points: Pașcani 0–0 USV Iași, USV Iași 2–1 Pașcani.)	Qualification to promotion play-off
2	Pașcani	30	24	4	2	103	20	+83	76	
3	Tonmir Iași	30	22	4	4	87	38	+49	70	
4	Victoria Lețcani	30	19	6	5	90	37	+53	63	
5	Moldova Cristești	30	20	2	8	84	40	+44	62	
6	Stejarul Dobrovăț	30	17	6	7	93	45	+48	57	
7	Țuțora	30	17	0	13	76	76	0	51	
8	Com-Val Valea Lupului	30	12	7	11	66	50	+16	43	
9	Unirea Ruginoasa	30	11	5	14	60	56	+4	38	
10	Gloria Bălțați	30	12	2	16	53	83	−30	38	
11	Stejarul Bârnova	30	9	5	16	58	83	−25	32	
12	Zimbru Boureni	30	9	1	20	51	82	−31	28	
13	Unirea Scânteia	30	8	2	20	39	90	−51	26	
14	Viitorul Hârlau (Note: Viitorul Hârlau was spared from relegation due to the promotion of USV Iași in Liga III.)	30	6	2	22	45	112	−67	20	Spared from relegation
15	Stejarul Sinești (Note: Stejarul Sinești withdrew before the start of the second part and lost all remaining matches with 0–3.) (R)	30	2	1	27	20	97	−77	7	Relegation to Liga V Iași
16	Unirea Alexandru Ioan Cuza (R)	30	1	3	26	34	118	−84	6	Relegation to Liga V Iași

Rules for classification: 1) Points; 2) Head-to-head points; 3) Head-to-head goal difference; 4) Head-to-head goals scored; 5) Head-to-head away goals scored; 6) Goal difference; 7) Goals scored.
(C) Champions; (Q) Qualified for the phase indicated; (R) Relegated

=== Ilfov County ===
Team changes from the previous season

- LPS HD Clinceni achieved promotion to Liga III.
- CS Tunari II, ARD Snagov, CS Balotești, CSO Bragadiru, Viitorul Petrăchioaia and Viitorul Domnești withdrew.
- LPS HD Clinceni II was admitted upon request.

Pos	Team	Pld	W	D	L	GF	GA	GD	Pts	Qualification or relegation
1	Ștefănești (C, Q)	28	26	1	1	139	21	+118	79	Qualification to promotion play-off
2	Olimpic Snagov	28	18	8	2	85	30	+55	62	
3	Voința Domnești	28	17	4	7	77	52	+25	55	
4	Glina	28	17	3	8	95	67	+28	54	
5	Viitorul Dragomirești-Vale	28	16	3	9	103	61	+42	51	
6	Ciorogârla	28	12	6	10	74	68	+6	42	
7	Măgurele	28	11	3	14	45	74	−29	36	
8	Brănești	28	10	5	13	70	76	−6	35	
9	Juniors Berceni	28	10	4	14	61	62	−1	34	
10	Stejarul Gruiu	28	7	8	13	51	74	−23	29	
11	LPS HD Clinceni II	28	9	2	17	52	77	−25	29	
12	Voința Buftea	28	8	3	17	63	98	−35	27	
13	Viitorul Vidra	28	8	2	18	72	128	−56	26	
14	1 Decembrie	28	6	6	16	46	77	−31	24	
15	Viitorul Pantelimon	28	6	0	22	55	123	−68	18	

Rules for classification: 1) Points; 2) Head-to-head points; 3) Head-to-head goal difference; 4) Head-to-head goals scored; 5) Head-to-head away goals scored; 6) Goal difference; 7) Goals scored.
(C) Champions; (Q) Qualified for the phase indicated

=== Maramureș County ===
Team changes from the previous season

- Gloria Culcea (Series I winners) and AS Mireșu Mare (Series II winners) declined promotion from Liga V Maramureș.
- Luceafărul Strâmtura, Carmen Satulung withdrew.
- CS Seini and Viitorul Ulmeni withdrew during the previous season.
- Lăpuș R was renamed Atletic Lăpuș.
- Unirea Șișești was renamed AFC Șișești.

South Series

Pos	Team	Pld	W	D	L	GF	GA	GD	Pts	Qualification or relegation
1	Progresul Șomcuta Mare (Q)	16	12	2	2	55	23	+32	38	Qualification to final four
2	Academica Recea (Q)	16	12	1	3	58	22	+36	37	Qualification to final four
3	Bradul Groșii Țibleșului	16	10	2	4	31	18	+13	32	
4	Gloria Tăuții-Măgherăuș	16	6	4	6	37	35	+2	22	
5	Minerul Baia Sprie	16	7	1	8	35	48	−13	22	
6	Șișești	16	6	1	9	33	49	−16	19	
7	Fărcașa	16	5	1	10	25	42	−17	16	
8	Lăpușul Târgu Lăpuș	16	5	0	11	29	50	−21	15	
9	Atletic Lăpuș	16	2	2	12	34	50	−16	8	

Rules for classification: 1) Points; 2) Head-to-head points; 3) Head-to-head goal difference; 4) Head-to-head goals scored; 5) Head-to-head away goals scored; 6) Goal difference; 7) Goals scored.
(Q) Qualified for the phase indicated

North Series

Pos	Team	Pld	W	D	L	GF	GA	GD	Pts	Qualification or relegation
1	Recolta Săliștea de Sus (Q)	14	11	1	2	38	15	+23	34	Qualification to final four
2	Bradul Vișeu de Sus (Q)	14	10	2	2	30	7	+23	32	Qualification to final four
3	Avântul Bârsana	14	9	3	2	43	19	+24	30	
4	Salina Ocna Șugatag	14	8	0	6	27	25	+2	24	
5	Zorile Moisei	14	3	3	8	20	33	−13	12	
6	Plimob Sighetu Marmației	14	4	0	10	28	48	−20	12	
7	Remeți	14	3	1	10	23	47	−24	10	
8	Iza Dragomirești	14	3	0	11	22	37	−15	9	

Rules for classification: 1) Points; 2) Head-to-head points; 3) Head-to-head goal difference; 4) Head-to-head goals scored; 5) Head-to-head away goals scored; 6) Goal difference; 7) Goals scored.
(Q) Qualified for the phase indicated

Final four
Semi-finals

The matches were played on 19 and 26 May 2024.

Team 1	Agg.	Team 2	1st leg	2nd leg
Bradul Vișeu de Sus	4–2	Progresul Șomcuta Mare	2–1	2–1
Academica Recea	8–3	Recolta Săliștea de Sus	4–1	4–2

Final

The matches were played on 2 and 8 June 2024.

Team 1	Agg.	Team 2	1st leg	2nd leg
Academica Recea	4–1	Bradul Vișeu de Sus	3–0	1–1

Academica Recea won the Liga IV Maramureș County and qualified for the promotion play-off in Liga III.

=== Mehedinți County ===
Team changes from the previous season

- AS Obârșia de Câmp and Real Vânători withdrew.
- CS Drobeta 2024, AS Strehaia, Sănătatea Breznița-Ocol, Decebal Eșelnița, CFR Turnu Severin, Avântul Bistrița, Viitorul Dârvari, Unirea Gârla Mare, Voința Oprișor and Viitorul Grozești were admitted upon request.

Series I

Pos	Team	Pld	W	D	L	GF	GA	GD	Pts	Qualification
1	Drobeta 2024	20	17	2	1	124	10	+114	53	Qualification to championship play-off
2	Pandurii Cerneți	20	17	1	2	67	23	+44	52	Qualification to championship play-off
3	Strehaia	20	12	3	5	60	30	+30	39	Qualification to championship play-off
4	Sănătatea Breznița-Ocol	20	10	2	8	57	37	+20	32	Qualification to championship play-out
5	Noapteșa	20	9	3	8	49	59	−10	30	Qualification to championship play-out
6	Victoria Strehaia	20	8	3	9	38	40	−2	27	Qualification to championship play-out
7	Coșuștea Căzănești	20	8	1	11	55	78	−23	25	Qualification to championship play-out
8	Decebal Eșelnița	20	7	1	12	37	51	−14	22	Qualification to championship play-out
9	Academia Flavius Stoican	20	4	2	14	31	81	−50	14	Qualification to championship play-out
10	CFR Turnu Severin (Note: CFR Turnu Severin withdrew and lost all matches from the second part of the regular season with 0–3.)	20	4	1	15	17	71	−54	13	Qualification to championship play-out
11	Viitorul Grozești	20	4	1	15	43	98	−55	13	Qualification to championship play-out

Rules for classification: 1) Points; 2) Head-to-head points; 3) Head-to-head goal difference; 4) Head-to-head goals scored; 5) Head-to-head away goals scored; 6) Goal difference; 7) Goals scored.
Notes:

Series II

Pos	Team	Pld	W	D	L	GF	GA	GD	Pts	Qualification
1	Viitorul Severin	18	16	2	0	112	17	+95	50	Qualification to championship play-off
2	Recolta Dănceu	18	15	2	1	108	21	+87	47	Qualification to championship play-off
3	Victoria Vânju Mare	18	12	2	4	60	22	+38	38	Qualification to championship play-off
4	Viitorul Cujmir	18	12	0	6	60	31	+29	36	Qualification to championship play-out
5	Gogoșu	18	8	0	10	51	57	−6	24	Qualification to championship play-out
6	Avântul Bistrița	18	7	2	9	35	65	−30	23	Qualification to championship play-out
7	Inter Salcia	18	7	1	10	40	38	+2	22	Qualification to championship play-out
8	Viitorul Dârvari	18	4	1	13	35	105	−70	13	Qualification to championship play-out
9	Unirea Gârla Mare	18	2	2	14	24	85	−61	8	Qualification to championship play-out
10	Voința Oprișor	18	1	0	17	17	101	−84	3	Qualification to championship play-out

Rules for classification: 1) Points; 2) Head-to-head points; 3) Head-to-head goal difference; 4) Head-to-head goals scored; 5) Head-to-head away goals scored; 6) Goal difference; 7) Goals scored.

Championship play-off

The championship play-off was played in a double round-robin tournament between the best three ranked teams in the two series. The teams started the play-off with the points accumulated only in the matches between the top three ranked teams from each series.

Pos	Team	Pld	W	D	L	GF	GA	GD	Pts	Qualification
1	Viitorul Severin (C, Q)	10	9	0	1	35	10	+25	37	Qualification to promotion play-off
2	Drobeta 2024	10	6	2	2	31	14	+17	32	
3	Recolta Dănceu	10	6	2	2	35	19	+16	25	
4	Pandurii Cerneți	10	3	2	5	22	33	−11	15	
5	Strehaia	10	1	2	7	12	32	−20	6	
6	Victoria Vânju Mare	10	1	0	9	13	40	−27	4	

Rules for classification: 1) Points; 2) Head-to-head points; 3) Head-to-head goal difference; 4) Head-to-head goals scored; 5) Head-to-head away goals scored; 6) Goal difference; 7) Goals scored.
(C) Champions; (Q) Qualified for the phase indicated

Championship play-out
Series I

Pos	Team	Pld	W	D	L	GF	GA	GD	Pts	Relegation
7	Sănătatea Breznița-Ocol	6	5	0	1	16	5	+11	47	
8	Noapteșa	6	4	0	2	17	10	+7	42	
9	Victoria Strehaia	6	3	1	2	14	10	+4	37	
10	Decebal Eșelnița	6	4	1	1	16	11	+5	35	
11	Coșuștea Căzănești	6	3	0	3	13	14	−1	34	
12	Viitorul Grozești	6	1	0	5	11	26	−15	16	
13	Academia Flavius Stoican	6	0	0	6	6	17	−11	14	
14	CFR Turnu Severin (Note: CFR Turnu Severin withdrew in the second part of the regular season.) (D)	0	0	0	0	0	0	0	13	Withdrew

Rules for classification: 1) Points; 2) Head-to-head points; 3) Head-to-head goal difference; 4) Head-to-head goals scored; 5) Head-to-head away goals scored; 6) Goal difference; 7) Goals scored.
(D) Disqualified
Notes:

Series II

Pos	Team	Pld	W	D	L	GF	GA	GD	Pts
7	Viitorul Cujmir	6	4	1	1	15	11	+4	49
8	Gogoșu	6	4	0	2	29	13	+16	36
9	Avântul Bistrița	6	4	1	1	18	15	+3	36
10	Inter Salcia	6	4	1	1	21	14	+7	35
11	Viitorul Dârvari	6	2	0	4	16	19	−3	19
12	Unirea Gârla Mare	6	1	1	4	16	21	−5	12
13	Voința Oprișor	6	0	0	6	11	33	−22	3

Rules for classification: 1) Points; 2) Head-to-head points; 3) Head-to-head goal difference; 4) Head-to-head goals scored; 5) Head-to-head away goals scored; 6) Goal difference; 7) Goals scored.

=== Mureș County ===
Team changes from the previous season

- ASF Pogăceaua (winners) and Viitorul Aluniș (runners-up) were promoted from Liga V Mureș.
- Sâncrai Nazna replaced promoted side Viitorul Jabenița (3rd place) from Liga V Mureș.
- Rază de Soare Acățari (14th place) was relegated to Liga V Mureș.
- Târnava Mică Sângeorgiu de Pădure was renamed CSO Sângeorgiu de Pădure.

Series I

Pos	Team	Pld	W	D	L	GF	GA	GD	Pts	Qualification or relegation
1	Iernut	16	14	0	2	96	19	+77	42	Qualification to championship play-off
2	Mureșul Luduș	16	13	1	2	60	20	+40	40	Qualification to championship play-off
3	Pogăceaua	16	9	2	5	68	29	+39	29	Qualification to championship play-off
4	Câmpia Râciu	16	8	2	6	37	27	+10	26	Qualification to championship play-off
5	A&A Grup Târnăveni	16	7	4	5	33	25	+8	25	Qualification to championship play-out
6	Gaz Metan Daneș	16	7	4	5	36	29	+7	25	Qualification to championship play-out
7	Búzásbesenyő Valea Izvoarelor	16	3	1	12	27	86	−59	10	Qualification to championship play-out
8	Chimica Târnăveni	16	2	1	13	17	82	−65	7	Qualification to championship play-out
9	Sighișoara	16	1	1	14	18	75	−57	4	Qualification to championship play-out

Rules for classification: 1) Points; 2) Head-to-head points; 3) Head-to-head goal difference; 4) Head-to-head goals scored; 5) Head-to-head away goals scored; 6) Goal difference; 7) Goals scored.

Series II

Pos	Team	Pld	W	D	L	GF	GA	GD	Pts	Qualification or relegation
1	ASA Târgu Mureș	16	13	1	2	66	18	+48	40	Qualification to championship play-off
2	Atletic Târgu Mureș	16	11	2	3	53	25	+28	35	Qualification to championship play-off
3	Sâncrai Nazna	16	11	1	4	56	24	+32	34	Qualification to championship play-off
4	Academica Transilvania Târgu Mureș	16	10	2	4	49	29	+20	32	Qualification to championship play-off
5	Mureșul Rușii-Munți	16	7	0	9	41	60	−19	21	Qualification to championship play-out
6	Sovata	16	4	3	9	32	50	−18	15	Qualification to championship play-out
7	Sângeorgiu de Pădure	16	4	2	10	28	43	−15	14	Qualification to championship play-out
8	Viitorul Aluniș	16	4	1	11	18	44	−26	13	Qualification to championship play-out
9	Miercurea Nirajului	16	1	2	13	14	64	−50	5	Qualification to championship play-out

Rules for classification: 1) Points; 2) Head-to-head points; 3) Head-to-head goal difference; 4) Head-to-head goals scored; 5) Head-to-head away goals scored; 6) Goal difference; 7) Goals scored.

Championship play-off

In the championship play-off each team plays every other team once. Depending on the place occupied in the regular season, the teams started the play-off with the following points: 1st place – 3 points, 2nd place – 2 points, 3rd place – 1 point, 4th place – 0 points.

Pos	Team	Pld	W	D	L	GF	GA	GD	Pts	Qualification
1	Iernut (C, Q)	7	6	0	1	32	13	+19	21	Qualification to promotion play-off
2	Sâncrai Nazna	7	6	0	1	20	7	+13	19	
3	Pogăceaua	7	5	1	1	28	15	+13	17	
4	ASA Târgu Mureș	7	4	0	3	22	13	+9	15	
5	Mureșul Luduș	7	2	1	4	16	18	−2	9	
6	Câmpia Râciu	7	2	0	5	12	25	−13	6	
7	Academica Transilvania Târgu Mureș	7	1	2	4	13	26	−13	5	
8	Atletic Târgu Mureș	7	0	0	7	7	33	−26	2	

Rules for classification: 1) Points; 2) Head-to-head points; 3) Head-to-head goal difference; 4) Head-to-head goals scored; 5) Head-to-head away goals scored; 6) Goal difference; 7) Goals scored.
(C) Champions; (Q) Qualified for the phase indicated

Championship play-out

In the championship play-out each team plays every other team once. Depending on the place occupied in the regular season, the teams started the play-out with the following points: 5th place – 4 points, 6th place – 3 points, 7th place – 2 points, 8th place – 1 point, 9th place – 0 points.

Pos	Team	Pld	W	D	L	GF	GA	GD	Pts	Relegation
9	A&A Grup Târnăveni	9	6	1	2	23	14	+9	23	
10	Mureșul Rușii-Munți	9	6	1	2	43	12	+31	23	
11	Miercurea Nirajului	9	7	0	2	25	13	+12	21	
12	Sovata	9	5	0	4	31	20	+11	18	
13	Viitorul Aluniș	9	5	0	4	22	17	+5	16	
14	Gaz Metan Daneș	9	4	1	4	19	18	+1	16	
15	Sângeorgiu de Pădure	9	4	1	4	22	14	+8	15	
16	Búzásbesenyő Valea Izvoarelor	9	3	0	6	16	31	−15	11	
17	Sighișoara (R)	9	3	0	6	12	27	−15	9	Relegation to Liga V Mureș
18	Chimica Târnăveni (R)	9	0	0	9	6	53	−47	1	Relegation to Liga V Mureș

Rules for classification: 1) Points; 2) Head-to-head points; 3) Head-to-head goal difference; 4) Head-to-head goals scored; 5) Head-to-head away goals scored; 6) Goal difference; 7) Goals scored.
(R) Relegated

=== Neamț County ===
The Liga IV Neamț County was played over two series in a double round-robin format. The top three teams in each series advanced to the championship play-off. Teams entered the play-off carrying over all results obtained against the other qualified teams from the regular season and played only against teams from the opposite series. The remaining teams advanced to the championship play-out, where they also carried over all results against the other qualified teams and played only against teams from the opposite series.

Team changes from the previous season

- Teiul Poiana Teiului withdrew.
- Spartanii Săbăoani, Unirea Dulcești, Ceahlăul Piatra Neamț II, Pietricica Piatra Neamț, Viitorul Tarcău and Borussia Pângărați were admitted upon request.

East Series

Pos	Team	Pld	W	D	L	GF	GA	GD	Pts	Qualification or relegation
1	Roman	18	16	1	1	99	13	+86	49	Qualification to championship play-off
2	Victoria Horia	18	14	1	3	75	21	+54	43	Qualification to championship play-off
3	Voința Ion Creangă	18	12	1	5	73	27	+46	37	Qualification to championship play-off
4	Unirea Trifești	18	9	4	5	40	23	+17	31	Qualification to championship play-out
5	Unirea Tămășeni	18	7	3	8	38	55	−17	24	Qualification to championship play-out
6	Spartanii Săbăoani	18	7	3	8	31	44	−13	24	Qualification to championship play-out
7	Voința Dochia	18	6	4	8	33	48	−15	22	Qualification to championship play-out
8	Siretul Doljești	18	4	1	13	31	70	−39	13	Qualification to championship play-out
9	Unirea Dulcești	18	3	2	13	27	94	−67	11	Qualification to championship play-out
10	Biruința Gherăești (Note: Biruința Gherăești withdrew and lost all matches from the second part of the regular season with 0–3.)	18	2	0	16	20	72	−52	6	Qualification to championship play-out

Rules for classification: 1) Points; 2) Head-to-head points; 3) Head-to-head goal difference; 4) Head-to-head goals scored; 5) Head-to-head away goals scored; 6) Goal difference; 7) Goals scored.
Notes:

West Series

Pos	Team	Pld	W	D	L	GF	GA	GD	Pts	Qualification or relegation
1	Ceahlăul Piatra Neamț II	20	18	1	1	97	8	+89	55	Qualification to championship play-off
2	Speranța Răucești	20	15	4	1	73	24	+49	49	Qualification to championship play-off
3	Pietricica Piatra Neamț	20	12	2	6	72	40	+32	38	Qualification to championship play-off
4	Viitorul Borca	20	10	3	7	64	50	+14	33	Qualification to championship play-out
5	Viitorul Tarcău	20	10	3	7	38	25	+13	33	Qualification to championship play-out
6	Grumăzești	20	9	2	9	55	55	0	29	Qualification to championship play-out
7	Ozana Timișești	20	7	2	11	48	51	−3	23	Qualification to championship play-out
8	Borussia Pângărați	20	7	2	11	43	68	−25	23	Qualification to championship play-out
9	Vulturul Costișa	20	5	1	14	22	64	−42	16	Qualification to championship play-out
10	Viitorul Podoleni	20	3	4	13	18	65	−47	13	Qualification to championship play-out
11	Girov	20	1	2	17	20	100	−80	5	Qualification to championship play-out

Rules for classification: 1) Points; 2) Head-to-head points; 3) Head-to-head goal difference; 4) Head-to-head goals scored; 5) Head-to-head away goals scored; 6) Goal difference; 7) Goals scored.

Championship play-off

Pos	Team	Pld	W	D	L	GF	GA	GD	Pts	Qualification
1	Ceahlăul Piatra Neamț II (C, Q)	10	8	0	2	45	7	+38	24	Qualification for promotion play-off
2	Speranța Răucești	10	6	2	2	19	10	+9	20	
3	Roman	10	5	0	5	21	21	0	15	
4	Voința Ion Creangă	10	4	1	5	19	29	−10	13	
5	Victoria Horia	10	4	1	5	13	26	−13	13	
6	Pietricica Piatra Neamț	10	1	0	9	12	36	−24	3	

Rules for classification: 1) Points; 2) Head-to-head points; 3) Head-to-head goal difference; 4) Head-to-head goals scored; 5) Head-to-head away goals scored; 6) Goal difference; 7) Goals scored.
(C) Champions; (Q) Qualified for the phase indicated

Championship play-out

Pos	Team	Pld	W	D	L	GF	GA	GD	Pts	Relegation
7	Unirea Trifești	20	16	3	1	61	14	+47	51	
8	Viitorul Tarcău	20	14	2	4	53	17	+36	44	
9	Grumăzești	20	12	4	4	62	42	+20	40	
10	Spartanii Săbăoani	20	10	2	8	43	38	+5	32	
11	Ozana Timișești	20	10	1	9	64	40	+24	31	
12	Borussia Pângărați	20	10	1	9	51	51	0	31	
13	Voința Dochia	20	9	3	8	50	37	+13	30	
14	Unirea Tămășeni	20	8	4	8	49	51	−2	28	
15	Viitorul Borca (Note: Viitorul Borca withdrew before the start of the play-out and lost all matches with 0–3.)	20	9	1	10	55	45	+10	28	
16	Siretul Doljești	20	8	3	9	43	45	−2	27	
17	Vulturul Costișa	20	8	1	11	38	56	−18	25	
18	Viitorul Podoleni	20	6	3	11	26	58	−32	21	
19	Girov	20	4	2	14	25	65	−40	14	
20	Unirea Dulcești	20	4	2	14	31	71	−40	14	
21	Biruința Gherăești (Note: Biruința Gherăești withdrew in the second part of the regular season.) (D)	0	0	0	0	0	0	0	0	Withdrew

Rules for classification: 1) Points; 2) Head-to-head points; 3) Head-to-head goal difference; 4) Head-to-head goals scored; 5) Head-to-head away goals scored; 6) Goal difference; 7) Goals scored.
(D) Disqualified

=== Olt County ===
Team changes from the previous season

- Oltul Curtișoara achieved promotion to Liga III.
- Unirea Radomirești, Valea Oltului Ipotești and Energia Viitorul Strejești withdrew.
- Recolta Stoicănești and Victoria Dăneasa were admitted upon request.

Pos	Team	Pld	W	D	L	GF	GA	GD	Pts	Qualification or relegation
1	Iris Titulescu (C, Q)	26	22	2	2	106	29	+77	68	Qualification to promotion play-off
2	Viitorul Știința Drăgănești-Olt	26	18	3	5	83	32	+51	57	
3	Oltul Slătioara	26	17	2	7	64	37	+27	53	
4	Știința Mărunței	26	17	1	8	83	50	+33	52	
5	Viitorul Coteana	26	14	4	8	73	39	+34	46	
6	Recolta Stoicănești	26	11	6	9	65	52	+13	39	
7	Caracal (Note: Caracal withdrew after 13 rounds and lost all matches from the second part of the season with 0–3.)	26	11	2	13	48	47	+1	35	
8	Olt Scornicești	26	10	4	12	54	54	0	34	
9	Viitorul Osica de Jos	26	10	4	12	66	65	+1	34	
10	Viitorul Rusănești	26	11	1	14	60	91	−31	34	
11	Unirea Pârșcoveni	26	8	8	10	39	53	−14	32	
12	Voința Schitu	26	5	3	18	34	69	−35	18	
13	Oltețul Osica	26	3	4	19	35	104	−69	13	
14	Victoria Dăneasa	26	2	2	22	38	126	−88	8	

Rules for classification: 1) Points; 2) Head-to-head points; 3) Head-to-head goal difference; 4) Head-to-head goals scored; 5) Head-to-head away goals scored; 6) Goal difference; 7) Goals scored.
(C) Champions; (Q) Qualified for the phase indicated

=== Prahova County ===
Team changes from the previous season

- Tricolorul Breaza achieved promotion to Liga III.
- Unirea Cocorăștii Colț (winners) and Olimpia Comarnic (runners-up) were promoted from Liga V Prahova.
- CS Strejnic (18th place) was relegated to Liga V Prahova.
- Olimpia Comarnic was renamed CSO Comarnic.
- Atletic United 1906 Ploiești ceded its place to Petrosport Ploiești.

Pos	Team	Pld	W	D	L	GF	GA	GD	Pts	Qualification or relegation
1	Băicoi (C, Q)	34	31	1	2	121	21	+100	94	Qualification to promotion play-off
2	Teleajenul Vălenii de Munte	34	28	4	2	123	21	+102	88	
3	Boldești-Scăeni	34	28	3	3	121	11	+110	87	
4	Cornu	34	22	3	9	94	39	+55	69	
5	Petrolul 95 Ploiești	34	19	5	10	78	46	+32	62	
6	Bănești-Urleta	34	19	5	10	69	46	+23	62	
7	Triumf Poiana Câmpina	34	20	0	14	80	72	+8	60	
8	Câmpina	34	16	4	14	75	59	+16	52	
9	Vărbilău	34	15	2	17	68	63	+5	47	
10	Mănești	34	13	7	14	62	62	0	46	
11	Avântul Măneciu	34	14	4	16	50	55	−5	46	
12	Brebu	34	12	6	16	52	58	−6	42	
13	Brazi	34	10	5	19	46	81	−35	35	
14	Petrosport Ploiești	34	10	5	19	52	94	−42	35	
15	Comarnic	34	9	4	21	48	84	−36	31	
16	Unirea Cocorăștii Colț	34	4	4	26	36	115	−79	16	
17	Berceni (Note: Berceni was excluded after 19 rounds and lost all matches from the second half with 0–3.) (R)	34	3	0	31	18	115	−97	9	Relegation to Liga V Prahova
18	Unirea Urlați (R)	34	2	0	32	15	166	−151	6	Relegation to Liga V Prahova

Rules for classification: 1) Points; 2) Head-to-head points; 3) Head-to-head goal difference; 4) Head-to-head goals scored; 5) Head-to-head away goals scored; 6) Goal difference; 7) Goals scored.
(C) Champions; (Q) Qualified for the phase indicated; (R) Relegated

=== Satu Mare County ===
Team changes from the previous season

- Olimpia MCMXXI Satu Mare achieved promotion to Liga III.
- Voința Turț (13th place) was relegated to Liga V Satu Mare.
- Sportul Botiz was renamed ACS Botiz.
- Someșul Odoreu took the place of Crasna Moftinu Mic (Series A winners) from Liga V Satu Mare.
- Recolta Dorolț II (Series B winners) from Liga V Satu Mare did not have the right to promotion.
- Viitorul Vetiș, Luceafărul Decebal and Unirea Păulești withdrew during the previous season.

Pos	Team	Pld	W	D	L	GF	GA	GD	Pts	Qualification or relegation
1	Oașul Negrești-Oaș	20	16	0	4	81	32	+49	48	Qualification to championship play-off
2	Talna Orașu Nou	20	14	2	4	68	21	+47	44	Qualification to championship play-off
3	Recolta Dorolț	20	14	1	5	69	22	+47	43	Qualification to championship play-off
4	Unirea Tășnad	20	13	4	3	56	21	+35	43	Qualification to championship play-off
5	Știința Beltiug	20	12	4	4	47	26	+21	40	
6	Botiz	20	11	1	8	55	39	+16	34	
7	Fortuna Căpleni	19	7	1	11	29	60	−31	22	
8	Turul Micula	18	5	3	10	36	42	−6	18	
9	Schwaben Kalmandi Cămin	20	4	1	15	25	70	−45	13	
10	Căpleni	19	3	1	15	21	85	−64	10	
11	Someșul Odoreu (Note: Someșul Odoreu withdrew after 11 rounds and lost all matches from the second half 0–3.)	20	0	0	20	9	78	−69	0	
12	Stăruința Berveni (Note: Stăruința Berveni withdrew during the season, and all its results were canceled.) (D)	0	0	0	0	0	0	0	0	Withdrew

Updated to match(es) played on 19 May 2024. Source:
Rules for classification: 1) Points; 2) Head-to-head points; 3) Head-to-head goal difference; 4) Head-to-head goals scored; 5) Head-to-head away goals scored; 6) Goal difference; 7) Goals scored.
(D) Disqualified
Notes:

Championship play-off
Semi-finals

The matches were played as single legs on 25 and 26 May 2024.

Team 1	Score	Team 2
Oașul Negrești-Oaș	5–1	Unirea Tășnad
Talna Orașu Nou	2–1	Recolta Dorolț

Final

The match was played over two legs, on 2 and 8 June.

Team 1	Agg.	Team 2	1st leg	2nd leg
Talna Orașu Nou	3–4	Oașul Negrești-Oaș	3–3	0–1

Oașul Negrești-Oaș won the Liga IV Satu Mare County and qualified for the promotion play-off in Liga III.

=== Sălaj County ===
Team changes from the previous season

- Cetatea Buciumi (East Series winners) and Unirea Mirșid (West Series winners) were promoted from Liga V Sălaj.
- Sportul Șimleu Silvaniei II (13th place) was relegated to Liga V Sălaj.
- Venus Giurtelec replaced Juniorii Ip, which had withdrawn.

Pos	Team	Pld	W	D	L	GF	GA	GD	Pts	Qualification or relegation
1	Barcău Nușfalău (C, Q)	26	24	1	1	140	35	+105	73	Qualification to promotion play-off
2	Luceafărul Bălan	26	21	1	4	111	26	+85	64	
3	Chieșd	26	19	0	7	111	42	+69	57	
4	Ardealul Crișeni	26	18	2	6	81	42	+39	56	
5	Jibou	26	15	4	7	75	37	+38	49	
6	Rapid Zimbor	26	14	0	12	53	66	−13	42	
7	Inter Cizer	26	9	2	15	51	68	−17	29	
8	Creaca Jac	26	9	2	15	54	97	−43	29	
9	Someșul Someș-Odorhei	26	8	2	16	56	86	−30	26	
10	Cetatea Buciumi	26	7	2	17	45	85	−40	23	
11	Venus Giurtelec	26	6	4	16	50	113	−63	22	
12	Bănișor-Peceiu	26	6	4	16	44	109	−65	22	
13	Unirea Mirșid (R)	26	6	2	18	46	71	−25	20	Relegation to Liga V Sălaj
14	Cosniciu (R)	26	6	2	18	38	78	−40	20	Relegation to Liga V Sălaj

Rules for classification: 1) Points; 2) Head-to-head points; 3) Head-to-head goal difference; 4) Head-to-head goals scored; 5) Head-to-head away goals scored; 6) Goal difference; 7) Goals scored.
(C) Champions; (Q) Qualified for the phase indicated; (R) Relegated

=== Sibiu County ===
Team changes from the previous season

- ACS Mediaș achieved promotion to Liga III.
- Voința Dumbrăveni (Mediaș Series winners) was promoted from Liga V Sibiu.
- Gloria Păuca (Sibiu Series winners) declined promotion from Liga V Sibiu.
- Alma Sibiu was admitted to replace FC Dumbrăveni which withdrew.
- Voința Sibiu and CSO Copșa Mică were spared from relegation.

Pos	Team	Pld	W	D	L	GF	GA	GD	Pts	Qualification or relegation
1	Păltiniș Rășinari (C, Q)	26	23	3	0	113	19	+94	72	Qualification to promotion play-off
2	Voința Sibiu	26	22	1	3	128	14	+114	67	
3	Avrig	26	19	5	2	105	27	+78	62	
4	Inter Sibiu	26	13	3	10	66	46	+20	42	
5	Voința Dumbrăveni	26	15	2	9	83	61	+22	41 (Note: Voința Dumbrăveni deducted 6 points.)	
6	Agnita	26	12	4	10	66	50	+16	40	
7	Tălmaciu	26	10	5	11	42	89	−47	35	
8	Bradu	26	9	6	11	51	47	+4	33	
9	Sparta Mediaș	26	8	3	15	38	74	−36	27	
10	Quantum/Cuantic Arsenal Sibiu	26	5	9	12	31	58	−27	24	
11	Copșa Mică	26	7	3	16	46	100	−54	24	
12	Leii Șura Mică (R)	26	6	3	17	30	99	−69	21	Relegation to Liga V Sibiu
13	Alma Sibiu (R)	26	2	9	15	23	83	−60	15	Relegation to Liga V Sibiu
14	Unirea Miercurea Sibiului (Note: Unirea Miercurea Sibiului withdrew after the first half of the season and lost all remaining matches with 0–3.) (R)	26	2	2	22	19	74	−55	8	Relegation to Liga V Sibiu

Rules for classification: 1) Points; 2) Head-to-head points; 3) Head-to-head goal difference; 4) Head-to-head goals scored; 5) Head-to-head away goals scored; 6) Goal difference; 7) Goals scored.
(C) Champions; (Q) Qualified for the phase indicated; (R) Relegated

=== Suceava County ===
Team changes from the previous season

- Juniorul Salcea (Series I winners) and Minerul Iacobeni (Series II winners) were promoted from Liga V Suceava.
- Dorna Vatra Dornei (13th place; withdrew) and Concordia Grămești (15th place; withdrew) were relegated to Liga V Suceava.
- Academica Gălănești, Foresta Suceava II, Victoria Vatra Moldoviței and Siretul Dolhasca withdrew.
- Șoimii Gura Humorului, Bradul Putna, Forestierul Frumosu and Bucovina Rădăuți II were admitted upon request.

Pos	Team	Pld	W	D	L	GF	GA	GD	Pts	Qualification or relegation
1	Șoimii Gura Humorului (C, Q)	28	24	2	2	110	25	+85	74	Qualification to promotion play-off
2	Juniorul Salcea	28	24	1	3	110	16	+94	73	
3	Bradul Putna	28	22	3	3	81	37	+44	69	
4	Juniorul Suceava	28	22	0	6	99	31	+68	66	
5	Viitorul Liteni	28	17	4	7	117	43	+74	55	
6	Progresul Frătăuții Vechi	28	14	2	12	67	53	+14	44	
7	Forestierul Frumosu	28	14	2	12	65	71	−6	44	
8	Șomuzul Preutești	28	11	6	11	56	66	−10	39	
9	Recolta Fântânele	28	12	1	15	49	62	−13	37	
10	Moldova Drăgușeni	28	9	6	13	71	82	−11	30 (Note: Moldova Drăgușeni were deducted 3 points.)	
11	Sporting Poieni Solca	28	9	1	18	48	102	−54	28	
12	Minerul Iacobeni	28	9	0	19	63	85	−22	27	
13	Bucovina Dărmănești	28	7	0	21	46	122	−76	21	
14	ASA Rarău Câmpulung Moldovenesc	28	2	0	26	24	120	−96	6	
15	Bucovina Rădăuți II (Note: Bucovina Rădăuți II withdrew after 2 rounds and lost all remaining matches with 0–3.) (R)	28	0	0	28	3	94	−91	0	Relegation to Liga V Suceava

Rules for classification: 1) Points; 2) Head-to-head points; 3) Head-to-head goal difference; 4) Head-to-head goals scored; 5) Head-to-head away goals scored; 6) Goal difference; 7) Goals scored.
(C) Champions; (Q) Qualified for the phase indicated; (R) Relegated

=== Teleorman County ===
Team changes from the previous season

- Viitorul Piatra (winners) and Viitorul Lunca (4th place and promotion/relegation play-off winners) were promoted from Liga V Teleorman.
- Atletic Orbeasca (13th place and promotion/relegation play-off losers) and Ajax Botoroaga (14th place) were relegated to Liga V Teleorman.

Pos	Team	Pld	W	D	L	GF	GA	GD	Pts	Qualification or relegation
1	Nanov (C, Q)	26	25	0	1	95	20	+75	75	Qualification to promotion play-off
2	Rapid Buzescu	26	18	2	6	88	32	+56	56	
3	Metalul Peretu	26	17	3	6	63	38	+25	54	
4	Voința Saelele 2017	26	15	5	6	78	43	+35	50	
5	Avântul Bragadiru	26	14	1	11	58	45	+13	43	
6	Dinamic Kids Videle	26	11	6	9	48	45	+3	39	
7	Seaca	26	11	3	12	48	47	+1	36	
8	Astra Plosca	26	11	3	12	54	60	−6	36	
9	Viitorul Lunca	26	10	3	13	42	54	−12	33	
10	Drăgănești-Vlașca	26	9	5	12	46	65	−19	32	
11	Steaua Spătărei	26	8	1	17	37	64	−27	25	
12	Victoria Lunca (Note: Victoria Lunca excluded in the 26th round after two no show-ups.) (R)	26	5	3	18	42	88	−46	18	Relegation to Liga V Teleorman
13	Viitorul Piatra (Note: Viitorul Piatra withdrew after 13 rounds and lost all remaining matches with 0–3.) (R)	26	5	2	19	30	73	−43	17	Relegation to Liga V Teleorman
14	Vârtoape	26	4	1	21	50	105	−55	13	

Rules for classification: 1) Points; 2) Head-to-head points; 3) Head-to-head goal difference; 4) Head-to-head goals scored; 5) Head-to-head away goals scored; 6) Goal difference; 7) Goals scored.
(C) Champions; (Q) Qualified for the phase indicated; (R) Relegated

=== Timiș County ===
Team changes from the previous season

- CSC Peciu Nou achieved promotion to Liga III.
- Pobeda Stár Bišnov was relegated from Liga III.
- AS Gelu (Series I winners) and CSC Belinț (Series III winners) were promoted from Liga V Timiș.
- Juventus Pișchia (Series II winners) declined promotion from Liga V Timiș.
- Steaua Roșie Variaș (19th place) and Unirea Tomnatic (20th place) were relegated to Liga V Timiș.
- Voința Mașloc was renamed Voința Mașloc-Pișchia during the winter break.

Pos	Team	Pld	W	D	L	GF	GA	GD	Pts	Qualification or relegation
1	Timișul Șag (C, Q)	38	36	1	1	186	26	+160	109	Qualification to promotion play-off
2	Lugoj	38	35	2	1	185	25	+160	107	
3	Sânandrei Carani	38	28	4	6	119	37	+82	88	
4	Unirea Sânnicolau Mare	38	18	10	10	91	69	+22	64	
5	Progresul Ciacova	38	20	3	15	76	63	+13	63	
6	Deta	38	18	6	14	64	64	0	60	
7	Flacăra Parța	38	16	8	14	72	61	+11	56	
8	Liebling	38	15	9	14	70	59	+11	54	
9	Millenium Giarmata	38	15	7	16	74	67	+7	52	
10	Gloria Moșnița Nouă	38	14	8	16	71	91	−20	50	
11	Comloșu Mare	38	15	4	19	79	88	−9	49 (Note: Comloșu Mare are ahead of Progresul Gătaia on Head-to-head points.)	
12	Progresul Gătaia	38	13	10	15	49	62	−13	49	
13	Cocoșul Orțișoara	38	14	5	19	70	96	−26	47	
14	Belinț	38	13	5	20	70	85	−15	44	
15	UVT Timișoara	38	12	5	21	61	86	−25	41	
16	Gelu	38	10	7	21	49	98	−49	37	
17	Pobeda Stár Bišnov	38	10	6	22	59	109	−50	36	
18	Voința Mașloc-Pișchia (R)	38	10	5	23	72	115	−43	35	Relegation to Liga V Timiș
19	Avântul Topolovățu Mare (R)	38	7	3	28	61	183	−122	24	Relegation to Liga V Timiș
20	Unirea Jimbolia (R)	38	4	6	28	34	128	−94	18	Relegation to Liga V Timiș

Rules for classification: 1) Points; 2) Head-to-head points; 3) Head-to-head goal difference; 4) Head-to-head goals scored; 5) Head-to-head away goals scored; 6) Goal difference; 7) Goals scored.
(C) Champions; (Q) Qualified for the phase indicated; (R) Relegated

=== Tulcea County ===
The Liga IV Tulcea County was played over two stages. The regular season consisted of a double round-robin tournament featuring thirteen teams. At the end of this phase, the top four teams qualified for the championship play-off. Only teams with legal personality and holding a C.I.S. (Certificate of Sports Identity) issued by the Ministry of Youth and Sport were eligible to participate in the championship play-off.

Team changes from the previous season

- Hamangia Baia achieved promotion to Liga III.
- Victoria Delta Tulcea and Ceres Min Ceamurlia de Jos withdrew.
- Delta Tulcea and Triumf Cerna were admitted upon request.

Pos	Team	Pld	W	D	L	GF	GA	GD	Pts	Qualification or relegation
1	Pescărușul Sarichioi	24	23	0	1	118	19	+99	69	Qualification to championship play-off
2	Progresul Isaccea	24	22	0	2	144	32	+112	66	Qualification to championship play-off
3	Viitorul Murighiol	24	20	1	3	115	29	+86	61	
4	Șoimii Topolog	24	16	0	8	97	54	+43	48	
5	Flacăra Mihail Kogălniceanu	24	12	4	8	81	64	+17	40	Qualification to championship play-off
6	Partizanul Luncavița	24	12	2	10	81	73	+8	38	
7	Luceafărul Slava Cercheză	24	8	4	12	51	71	−20	28	
8	Heracleea Enisala	24	9	1	14	51	73	−22	28	
9	Delta Tulcea	24	7	1	16	64	91	−27	22	Qualification to championship play-off
10	Triumf Cerna	24	6	0	18	41	105	−64	18	
11	Viitorul Horia	24	6	0	18	48	131	−83	18	
12	Național Somova	24	4	1	19	38	89	−51	13	
13	Granitul Babadag	24	3	2	19	28	126	−98	11	

Rules for classification: 1) Points; 2) Head-to-head points; 3) Head-to-head goal difference; 4) Head-to-head goals scored; 5) Head-to-head away goals scored; 6) Goal difference; 7) Goals scored.

Championship play-off
Semi-finals

Team 1	Score	Team 2
Progresul Isaccea	5–0	Flacăra Mihail Kogălniceanu
Pescărușul Sarichioi	4–0	Delta Tulcea

Final

Team 1	Score	Team 2
Pescărușul Sarichioi	5–2	Progresul Isaccea

Pescărușul Sarichioi won the Liga IV Tulcea County and qualified for the promotion play-off in Liga III.

=== Vaslui County ===
Team changes from the previous season

- CSM Vaslui achieved promotion to Liga III.
- CSO Negrești (Series II winners and play-off winners) and Speranța Drânceni (Series I winners and play-off runners-up) were promoted from Liga V Vaslui.
- FC Crețești (12th place) was relegated to Liga V Vaslui.
- Sporting Juniorul Vaslui and Viitorul Rebricea were admitted to replace the withdrawn teams, Viitorul Vetrișoaia and Atletic Bârlad.

Pos	Team	Pld	W	D	L	GF	GA	GD	Pts	Qualification or relegation
1	Comstar Vaslui (C, Q)	22	19	2	1	75	13	+62	59	Qualification to promotion play-off
2	Sporting Banca	22	13	3	6	85	31	+54	42	
3	Gârceni	22	12	6	4	49	30	+19	42	
4	Negrești	22	11	7	4	61	31	+30	40	
5	Vulturești	22	12	1	9	58	54	+4	37	
6	Vitis Șuletea	22	10	5	7	45	41	+4	35	
7	Flacăra Muntenii de Sus	22	9	4	9	52	45	+7	31	
8	Viitorul Văleni	22	7	5	10	34	55	−21	26	
9	Viitorul Rebricea (O)	22	7	4	11	38	56	−18	25	Qualification to relegation play-out
10	Sporting Juniorul Vaslui (R)	22	4	4	14	42	88	−46	16 (Note: Sporting Juniorul Vaslui are ahead of Victoria Muntenii de Jos on Head-to-head points: Sporting Juniorul 2–0 Victoria, Victoria 2–5 Sporting Juniorul.)	Qualification to relegation play-out
11	Victoria Muntenii de Jos (R)	22	4	4	14	31	66	−35	16	Relegation to Liga V Vaslui
12	Speranța Drânceni (Note: Speranța Drânceni was excluded after 18 rounds and lost all matches from second half of the season with 0–3.) (R)	22	1	1	20	17	77	−60	4	Relegation to Liga V Vaslui

Rules for classification: 1) Points; 2) Head-to-head points; 3) Head-to-head goal difference; 4) Head-to-head goals scored; 5) Head-to-head away goals scored; 6) Goal difference; 7) Goals scored.
(C) Champions; (O) Play-off winners; (Q) Qualified for the phase indicated; (R) Relegated
Notes:

Relegation play-out

The 9th and 10th-placed teams of Liga IV faced the 3rd and 4th-placed teams of the Liga V Vaslui County play-off. The first leg was played on 16 June, and the second leg between 21 and 23 June 2024.

Team 1	Agg.	Team 2	1st leg	2nd leg
Viitorul Rebricea	7–3	Phoenix Team Tanacu	4–2	3–1
Sporting Juniorul Vaslui	2–8	Unrea Dodești	1–2	1–6

=== Vâlcea County ===
Team changes from the previous season

- SCM Râmnicu Vâlcea achieved promotion to Liga III.
- Minerul Costești was relegated from Liga III.
- Oltul Ionești (winners) was promoted from Liga V Vâlcea.
- Oltul Drăgoești (runners-up) declined promotion from Liga V Vâlcea.
- Stejarul Vlădești (16th place) was relegated to Liga V Vâlcea.
- Viitorul Mateești (15th place) was spared from relegation.

Pos	Team	Pld	W	D	L	GF	GA	GD	Pts	Qualification or relegation
1	Sparta Râmnicu Vâlcea (C, Q)	30	27	2	1	131	20	+111	83	Qualification for promotion play-off
2	Păușești Otăsău	30	26	2	2	117	27	+90	80	
3	Oltețul Alunu	30	23	2	5	97	42	+55	71	
4	Minerul Berbești	30	16	5	9	91	59	+32	53	
5	Chimia 1973 Râmnicu Vâlcea	30	16	3	11	80	65	+15	51	
6	Minerul Costești	30	16	3	11	71	62	+9	51	
7	Viitorul Budești	30	16	0	14	75	75	0	48	
8	Gușoeni	30	12	4	14	71	88	−17	40	
9	Oltul Ionești	30	12	3	15	69	62	+7	39	
10	Lotru Brezoi	30	12	2	16	74	86	−12	38	
11	Viitorul Mateești	30	8	4	18	50	88	−38	28	
12	Atletic Drăgășani	30	8	2	20	45	82	−37	26	
13	Unirea Tomșani	30	6	7	17	45	103	−58	25	
14	Băbeni	30	6	5	19	38	81	−43	23	
15	Mădulari (Note: Mădulari withdrew before the start of the second half and lost all remaining matches with 0–3.) (R)	30	7	1	22	34	75	−41	22	Relegation to Liga V Vâlcea
16	Foresta Malaia (R)	30	4	5	21	28	101	−73	17	Relegation to Liga V Vâlcea

Rules for classification: 1) Points; 2) Head-to-head points; 3) Head-to-head goal difference; 4) Head-to-head goals scored; 5) Head-to-head away goals scored; 6) Goal difference; 7) Goals scored.
(C) Champions; (Q) Qualified for the phase indicated; (R) Relegated

=== Vrancea County ===
The Liga IV Vrancea County featured a single round-robin regular season, followed by championship play-off. The top six teams entered a double round-robin play-off, keeping all points earned. Teams without at least one youth squad were ineligible for the play-offs. The bottom nine teams continued in the fifth league.

Team changes from the previous season

- Tractorul Nănești, Voința Sihlea and Prosport Focșani withdrew.
- FC Căiata, Dinamo Tătăranu, Gloria Bălești, Energia Vulturu, Victoria Gologanu and Național Golești were admitted upon request.

Pos	Team	Pld	W	D	L	GF	GA	GD	Pts	Qualification or relegation
1	Victoria Gugești	14	13	0	1	106	8	+98	39	Qualification for championship play-off
2	Adjud 1946	14	13	0	1	92	10	+82	39	Qualification for championship play-off
3	Viitorul Mărășești	14	11	0	3	52	15	+37	33	Qualification for championship play-off
4	Panciu	14	10	2	2	43	19	+24	32	Qualification for championship play-off
5	Național Golești	14	9	0	5	43	21	+22	27	Qualification for championship play-off
6	Victoria Gologanu	14	6	4	4	29	24	+5	22	Ineligible for promotion
7	Sportul Ciorăști	14	6	1	7	23	33	−10	19	Ineligible for promotion
8	Siretul Suraia	14	5	3	6	20	45	−25	18	Qualification for championship play-off
9	Homocea	14	5	1	8	26	39	−13	16	
10	Energia Vulturu	14	4	3	7	28	30	−2	15	
11	Căiata	14	4	1	9	15	62	−47	13	
12	Dumbrăveni	14	2	3	9	17	62	−45	9	
13	Gloria Bălești	14	2	2	10	14	68	−54	8	
14	Trotușul Ruginești	14	2	1	11	31	58	−27	7	
15	Dinamo Tătăranu	14	1	3	10	17	62	−45	6	

Rules for classification: 1) Points; 2) Head-to-head points; 3) Head-to-head goal difference; 4) Head-to-head goals scored; 5) Head-to-head away goals scored; 6) Goal difference; 7) Goals scored.

Championship play-off

Pos	Team	Pld	W	D	L	GF	GA	GD	Pts	Qualification
1	Adjud 1946 (C, Q)	10	9	0	1	68	5	+63	66 (Note: Adjud 1946 are ahead of Victoria Gugești on Head-to-head away goals scored: Victoria Gugești 3–2 Adjud 1946, Adjud 1946 1–0 Victoria Gugești.)	Qualification for promotion play-off
2	Victoria Gugești	10	9	0	1	54	5	+49	66	
3	Viitorul Mărășești	10	3	1	6	15	35	−20	43 (Note: Viitorul Mărășești are ahead of Panciu on Head-to-head points: Viitorul Mărășești 1–0 Panciu, Panciu 2–2 Viitorul Mărășești.)	
4	Panciu	10	3	2	5	16	32	−16	43	
5	Național Golești	10	3	1	6	19	43	−24	37	
6	Siretul Suraia	10	1	0	9	12	64	−52	21	

Rules for classification: 1) Points; 2) Head-to-head points; 3) Head-to-head goal difference; 4) Head-to-head goals scored; 5) Head-to-head away goals scored; 6) Goal difference; 7) Goals scored.
(C) Champions; (Q) Qualified for the phase indicated

== See also ==
- 2023–24 Liga I
- 2023–24 Liga II
- 2023–24 Liga III
- 2023–24 Cupa României
