= Marius Radu (footballer) =

Romanian footballer

Personal information
- Full name: Marius Adrian Radu
- Date of birth: 1 June 1977 (age 49)
- Place of birth: Iernut, Romania
- Height: 1.90 m (6 ft 3 in)
- Position: Defender

Senior career*
Years	Team	Apps	(Gls)
1997–1999	Chimica Târnăveni	17	(0)
1996–2006	Argeș Pitești	160	(2)
2006–2007	Sopron	39	(3)
2007–2008	Argeș Pitești	4	(0)
2008–2009	Tianjin Teda	22	(5)
2009	Gaz Metan Mediaș	2	(0)
2010–2011	FC Cisnădie		
2011–2014	Vișina Nouă		
2014–2017	Alexandria		
2017	Albota	5	(0)
2018–2019	Vedița Colonești		
2019	Juventus Bascov	18	(0)
2020–2023	Speed Academy	47	(3)
Total		314+	(13+)

Managerial career
- 2011–2012: Vișina Nouă (assistant)
- 2012: Vișina Nouă
- 2012–2014: Vișina Nouă (assistant)
- 2020–2025: Speed Academy (assistant)
- * Club domestic league appearances and goals as of 12:06, 8 December 2024 (UTC)

Marius Radu (born 1 June 1977 in Iernut) is a Romanian former footballer who played for teams such as Chimica Târnăveni, FC Argeș Pitești, FC Sopron or Tianjin Teda, among others. He is currently the assistant manager of Liga III club Speed Academy Pitești.
