= 2026–27 Liga III =

Liga III
- Season: 2026–27

The 2026–27 Liga III, (also known as Superscore Liga 3 for sponsorship reasons), is the 71st season of Liga III, the third tier of the Romanian football league system. The season began on 28 August 2026 and will conclude in June 2027.

The format is maintained at 96 teams, divided into eight series of twelve, which are played across three phases: a regular season, post-season play-offs and play-outs, and a knockout tournament. In the regular season, each team plays 22 matches in a double round-robin format, with the top four teams advancing to the promotion play-offs and the rest entering the play-outs. In the play-offs, teams are paired with those from neighboring series (1–2, 3–4, 5–6, 7–8) and carry over only the points obtained against the other qualified teams from their regular-season series, with the series winners being promoted to Liga II and the runners-up entering a knockout tournament for the fifth promotion spot. In the play-outs, teams ranked 5th–12th play a single round-robin, carrying over their regular-season points. The bottom two teams in each of the eight series are relegated to Liga IV, along with five additional 10th-placed teams that are determined based on the overall ranking.

== Team changes ==
Promoted to Liga II

- Cetatea Suceava – ended a one-year stay.
- Ștefănești – ended a two-year stay.
- Râmnicu Vâlcea – ended a three-year stay.
- Politehnica Timișoara – ended a three-year stay.
- Popești-Leordeni – ended a thirteen-year stay.

Relegated from Liga II

- Dinamo București and Olimpia Satu Mare – were spared relegation and admitted to fill the vacant spots in the second tier.
- Ceahlăul Piatra Neamț – returned after three years.
- Tunari – returned after one year.
- Câmpulung Muscel – returned after two years and was subsequently disbanded.

Promoted from Liga IV

- Bradul Putna
- Pașcani
- TSA Oradea
- Academica Recea
- Carpați Covasna
- Corona Brașov
- Nera Bogodinț
- Deva
- Drobeta-Turnu Severin
- Petrolul Hârtiești
- Viitorul Corbeanca
- Progresul Drăgănești
- Omega Sport București
- Petrolul Berca
- Portul Constanța

Relegated to Liga IV

- Dacia Unirea Brăila
- Nanov
- FCU 1948 Craiova
- Viitorul Dăești
- Gilortul Târgu Cărbunești
- Unirea DMO Hațeg
- Hidro Mecanica Șugag 1984
- Olimpia MCMXXI Satu Mare
- Sticla Arieșul Turda

Other changes

- Hușana Huși, Talna Orașu Nou, Viitorul Sântimbru, Astra Plosca, Lupii Profa and Gloria Ivești declined promotion.
- Gheorgheni, Bacău II, Râmnicu Sărat, Oțelul Galați II, Agigea, Dinamo 1948 II, Voluntari II, Urban Titu, Teleajenul Vălenii de Munte, Pucioasa, Filiași, Unirea Bascov and Unirea Dej were spared relegation.
- Știința Miroslava was excluded for failing to meet the administrative registration criteria.
- Șoimii Gura Humorului, Bucovina Rădăuți, Victoria Traian and Petrolul Ploiești II had withdrawn and were formally excluded by the FRF.
- Oxigen București and Politehnica Timișoara II were invited to fill the vacant spots.

== League map ==
Locations of Liga III clubs by series
Series I Series II Series III Series IV Series V Series VI Series VII Series VIII
Locations of Liga III clubs from Bucharest and the vicinity
Series III Series V

== Regular season ==
=== Series I ===
Pos	Team	Pld	W	D	L	GF	GA	GD	Pts	Qualification
1	Vaslui	12	9	3	0	30	14	+16	30	Qualification to Play-Off round
2	KSE Târgu Secuiesc	13	7	3	3	26	19	+7	24	Qualification to Play-Off round
3	USV Iași	12	6	4	2	19	12	+7	22	Qualification to Play-Off round
4	Bradul Putna	12	6	3	3	28	17	+11	21	Qualification to Play-Off round
5	Adjud	12	6	3	3	23	13	+10	21	Qualification to Play-Out round
6	Aerostar Bacău	12	5	3	4	19	16	+3	18	Qualification to Play-Out round
7	Odorheiu Secuiesc	12	4	5	3	16	15	+1	17	Qualification to Play-Out round
8	Bacău II	13	4	3	6	14	25	−11	15	Qualification to Play-Out round
9	Viitorul Onești	12	2	4	6	18	21	−3	10	Qualification to Play-Out round
10	Gheorgheni	12	2	3	7	15	24	−9	9	Qualification to Play-Out round
11	Pașcani	12	1	4	7	15	28	−13	7	Qualification to Play-Out round
12	Ceahlăul Piatra Neamț	12	0	4	8	6	25	−19	4	Qualification to Play-Out round

Updated to match(es) played on 13 November 2026. Source: FRF (in Romanian)
Rules for classification: 1) Points; 2) Head-to-head points; 3) Head-to-head goal difference; 4) Head-to-head goals scored;
5) Head-to-head away goals scored; 6) Goal difference; 7) Goals scored; 8) Play-off.

=== Series II ===
Pos	Team	Pld	W	D	L	GF	GA	GD	Pts	Qualification
1	Mediaș	12	9	2	1	31	15	+16	29	Qualification to Play-Off round
2	Băicoi	13	8	4	1	30	12	+18	28	Qualification to Play-Off round
3	Corona Brașov	12	8	3	1	33	5	+28	27	Qualification to Play-Off round
4	Inter Sibiu	12	8	0	4	33	12	+21	24	Qualification to Play-Off round
5	Olimpic Zărnești	13	7	2	4	24	29	−5	23	Qualification to Play-Out round
6	ARO Muscelul Câmpulung	13	5	5	3	25	18	+7	20	Qualification to Play-Out round
7	Săcele	12	6	0	6	21	21	0	18	Qualification to Play-Out round
8	Sepsi OSK II	12	5	1	6	20	23	−3	16	Qualification to Play-Out round
9	Teleajenul Vălenii de Munte	13	4	2	7	23	28	−5	14	Qualification to Play-Out round
10	Kids Tâmpa Brașov	13	3	0	10	12	26	−14	9	Qualification to Play-Out round
11	Tricolorul Breaza	12	1	1	10	11	36	−25	4	Qualification to Play-Out round
12	Carpați Covasna	13	0	2	11	5	43	−38	2	Qualification to Play-Out round

Updated to match(es) played on 13 November 2026. Source: FRF (in Romanian)
Rules for classification: 1) Points; 2) Head-to-head points; 3) Head-to-head goal difference; 4) Head-to-head goals scored;
5) Head-to-head away goals scored; 6) Goal difference; 7) Goals scored; 8) Play-off.

=== Series III ===
Pos	Team	Pld	W	D	L	GF	GA	GD	Pts	Qualification
1	Flacăra Moreni	13	12	1	0	49	9	+40	37	Qualification to Play-Off round
2	Tunari	12	9	2	1	37	14	+23	29	Qualification to Play-Off round
3	Petrolul Berca	12	6	2	4	33	31	+2	20	Qualification to Play-Off round
4	Blejoi	12	6	2	4	21	19	+2	20	Qualification to Play-Off round
5	Voința Crevedia	12	6	1	5	28	24	+4	19	Qualification to Play-Out round
6	Urban Titu	13	4	3	6	17	25	−8	15	Qualification to Play-Out round
7	Pucioasa	12	3	4	5	14	18	−4	13	Qualification to Play-Out round
8	Progresul Drăgănești	12	3	4	5	18	27	−9	13	Qualification to Play-Out round
9	Râmnicu Sărat	13	3	4	6	20	37	−17	13	Qualification to Play-Out round
10	Plopeni	12	3	2	7	14	26	−12	11	Qualification to Play-Out round
11	Viitorul Corbeanca	13	1	6	6	9	17	−8	9	Qualification to Play-Out round
12	Păulești	12	1	3	8	10	23	−13	6	Qualification to Play-Out round

Updated to match(es) played on 13 November 2026. Source: FRF (in Romanian)
Rules for classification: 1) Points; 2) Head-to-head points; 3) Head-to-head goal difference; 4) Head-to-head goals scored;
5) Head-to-head away goals scored; 6) Goal difference; 7) Goals scored; 8) Play-off.

=== Series IV ===
Pos	Team	Pld	W	D	L	GF	GA	GD	Pts	Qualification
1	Agricola Borcea	12	10	1	1	35	9	+26	31	Qualification to Play-Off round
2	Progresul Fundulea	13	9	1	3	35	15	+20	28	Qualification to Play-Off round
3	Înainte Modelu	13	7	1	5	30	20	+10	22	Qualification to Play-Off round
4	Unirea Braniștea	12	7	1	4	24	17	+7	22	Qualification to Play-Off round
5	Sporting Liești	12	7	0	5	42	23	+19	21	Qualification to Play-Out round
6	Agigea	12	6	3	3	21	19	+2	21	Qualification to Play-Out round
7	Dunărea Călărași	13	5	4	4	12	14	−2	19	Qualification to Play-Out round
8	Axiopolis Cernavodă	13	5	1	7	26	28	−2	16	Qualification to Play-Out round
9	Recolta Gheorghe Doja	13	5	1	7	23	40	−17	16	Qualification to Play-Out round
10	Gloria Băneasa	12	2	2	8	16	31	−15	8	Qualification to Play-Out round
11	Oțelul Galați II	13	2	1	10	10	32	−22	7	Qualification to Play-Out round
12	Portul Constanța	12	1	2	9	14	40	−26	5	Qualification to Play-Out round

Updated to match(es) played on 13 November 2026. Source: FRF (in Romanian)
Rules for classification: 1) Points; 2) Head-to-head points; 3) Head-to-head goal difference; 4) Head-to-head goals scored;
5) Head-to-head away goals scored; 6) Goal difference; 7) Goals scored; 8) Play-off.

=== Series V ===
Pos	Team	Pld	W	D	L	GF	GA	GD	Pts	Qualification
1	Dunărea Giurgiu	12	7	5	0	31	18	+13	26	Qualification to Play-Off round
2	Inter Ilfov	12	8	2	2	30	17	+13	26	Qualification to Play-Off round
3	Omega Sport București	12	7	4	1	16	9	+7	25	Qualification to Play-Off round
4	Alexandria	12	6	4	2	16	10	+6	22	Qualification to Play-Off round
5	FCSB II	13	6	1	6	25	30	−5	19	Qualification to Play-Out round
6	Progresul Mogoșoaia	13	4	4	5	19	24	−5	16	Qualification to Play-Out round
7	Dinamo București II	13	5	0	8	17	24	−7	15	Qualification to Play-Out round
8	AXI Arena	13	5	0	8	10	21	−11	15	Qualification to Play-Out round
9	Voluntari II	13	4	2	7	16	23	−7	14	Qualification to Play-Out round
10	Oxigen București	12	4	1	7	15	23	−8	13	Qualification to Play-Out round
11	Cetatea Turnu Măgurele	13	2	6	5	25	22	+3	12	Qualification to Play-Out round
12	Progresul Spartac București	12	2	1	9	12	17	−5	7	Qualification to Play-Out round

Updated to match(es) played on 13 November 2026. Source: FRF (in Romanian)
Rules for classification: 1) Points; 2) Head-to-head points; 3) Head-to-head goal difference; 4) Head-to-head goals scored;
5) Head-to-head away goals scored; 6) Goal difference; 7) Goals scored; 8) Play-off.

=== Series VI ===
Pos	Team	Pld	W	D	L	GF	GA	GD	Pts	Qualification
1	Drobeta-Turnu Severin	13	10	2	1	33	8	+25	32	Qualification to Play-Off round
2	Târgu Jiu	13	8	3	2	23	12	+11	27	Qualification to Play-Off round
3	Minerul Lupeni	12	7	2	3	13	8	+5	23	Qualification to Play-Off round
4	Universitatea Craiova II	13	5	5	3	19	13	+6	20	Qualification to Play-Off round
5	Păușești Otăsău	12	4	6	2	16	14	+2	18	Qualification to Play-Out round
6	Jiul Petroșani	12	5	3	4	15	15	0	18	Qualification to Play-Out round
7	Oltul Curtișoara	12	6	0	6	20	22	−2	18	Qualification to Play-Out round
8	Filiași	13	4	3	6	18	20	−2	15	Qualification to Play-Out round
9	Unirea Bascov	13	4	3	6	18	21	−3	15	Qualification to Play-Out round
10	Vulturii Fărcășești	12	3	3	6	17	18	−1	12	Qualification to Play-Out round
11	Academica Balș	13	2	4	7	14	18	−4	10	Qualification to Play-Out round
12	Petrolul Hârtiești	12	0	0	12	6	43	−37	0	Qualification to Play-Out round

Updated to match(es) played on 13 November 2026. Source: FRF (in Romanian)
Rules for classification: 1) Points; 2) Head-to-head points; 3) Head-to-head goal difference; 4) Head-to-head goals scored;
5) Head-to-head away goals scored; 6) Goal difference; 7) Goals scored; 8) Play-off.

=== Series VII ===
Pos	Team	Pld	W	D	L	GF	GA	GD	Pts	Qualification
1	Unirea Alba Iulia	12	9	2	1	34	5	+29	29	Qualification to Play-Off round
2	Timișul Șag	13	8	3	2	19	8	+11	27	Qualification to Play-Off round
3	Viitorul Arad	12	7	3	2	22	16	+6	24	Qualification to Play-Off round
4	Ghiroda	13	6	4	3	23	15	+8	22	Qualification to Play-Off round
5	Deva	13	6	4	3	27	21	+6	22	Qualification to Play-Out round
6	CIL Blaj	12	6	4	2	23	18	+5	22	Qualification to Play-Out round
7	Unirea Sântana	12	5	2	5	15	11	+4	17	Qualification to Play-Out round
8	Progresul Pecica	13	4	2	7	21	29	−8	14	Qualification to Play-Out round
9	Metalurgistul Cugir	13	3	4	6	14	21	−7	13	Qualification to Play-Out round
10	Politehnica Timișoara II	13	2	2	9	14	30	−16	8	Qualification to Play-Out round
11	CSU Alba Iulia	12	1	4	7	10	22	−12	7	Qualification to Play-Out round
12	Nera Bogodinț	12	0	2	10	5	31	−26	2	Qualification to Play-Out round

Updated to match(es) played on 13 November 2026. Source: FRF (in Romanian)
Rules for classification: 1) Points; 2) Head-to-head points; 3) Head-to-head goal difference; 4) Head-to-head goals scored;
5) Head-to-head away goals scored; 6) Goal difference; 7) Goals scored; 8) Play-off.

=== Series VIII ===
Pos	Team	Pld	W	D	L	GF	GA	GD	Pts	Qualification
1	Minaur Baia Mare	13	10	2	1	39	9	+30	32	Qualification to Play-Off round
2	Sănătatea Cluj	13	8	4	1	26	9	+17	28	Qualification to Play-Off round
3	Crișul Sântandrei	12	6	3	3	20	17	+3	21	Qualification to Play-Off round
4	Academica Recea	13	7	0	6	29	27	+2	21	Qualification to Play-Off round
5	Zalău	12	5	4	3	20	13	+7	19	Qualification to Play-Out round
6	Sighetu Marmației	12	5	3	4	22	16	+6	18	Qualification to Play-Out round
7	Lotus Băile Felix	13	4	4	5	22	22	0	16	Qualification to Play-Out round
8	Bihorul Beiuș	12	4	4	4	11	15	−4	16	Qualification to Play-Out round
9	Viitorul Cluj	12	4	3	5	22	19	+3	15	Qualification to Play-Out round
10	Unirea Tășnad	13	2	5	6	10	28	−18	11	Qualification to Play-Out round
11	Unirea Dej	12	2	2	8	7	18	−11	8	Qualification to Play-Out round
12	TSA Oradea	13	0	2	11	10	45	−35	2	Qualification to Play-Out round

Updated to match(es) played on 13 November 2026. Source: FRF (in Romanian)
Rules for classification: 1) Points; 2) Head-to-head points; 3) Head-to-head goal difference; 4) Head-to-head goals scored;
5) Head-to-head away goals scored; 6) Goal difference; 7) Goals scored; 8) Play-off.

== Play-off round ==
=== Series I ===
Pos	Team	Pld	W	D	L	GF	GA	GD	Pts	Promotion or qualification
1	Team1	0	0	0	0	0	0	0	0	Promotion to Liga II
2	Team2	0	0	0	0	0	0	0	0	Qualification to promotion play-offs
3	Team3	0	0	0	0	0	0	0	0	
4	Team4	0	0	0	0	0	0	0	0	
5	Team5	0	0	0	0	0	0	0	0	
6	Team6	0	0	0	0	0	0	0	0	
7	Team7	0	0	0	0	0	0	0	0	
8	Team8	0	0	0	0	0	0	0	0	

Updated to match(es) played on unknown. Source:
Rules for classification: 1) Points; 2) Points in the regular season; 3) Head-to-head points; 4) Head-to-head goal difference; 5) Head-to-head goals scored;
6) Head-to-head away goals scored; 7) Goal difference (regular season + play off); 8) Goals scored (regular season + play off); 9) Play-off.

=== Series II ===
Pos	Team	Pld	W	D	L	GF	GA	GD	Pts	Promotion or qualification
1	Team1	0	0	0	0	0	0	0	0	Promotion to Liga II
2	Team2	0	0	0	0	0	0	0	0	Qualification to promotion play-offs
3	Team3	0	0	0	0	0	0	0	0	
4	Team4	0	0	0	0	0	0	0	0	
5	Team5	0	0	0	0	0	0	0	0	
6	Team6	0	0	0	0	0	0	0	0	
7	Team7	0	0	0	0	0	0	0	0	
8	Team8	0	0	0	0	0	0	0	0	

Updated to match(es) played on unknown. Source:
Rules for classification: 1) Points; 2) Points in the regular season; 3) Head-to-head points; 4) Head-to-head goal difference; 5) Head-to-head goals scored;
6) Head-to-head away goals scored; 7) Goal difference (regular season + play off); 8) Goals scored (regular season + play off); 9) Play-off.

=== Series III ===
Pos	Team	Pld	W	D	L	GF	GA	GD	Pts	Promotion or qualification
1	Team1	0	0	0	0	0	0	0	0	Promotion to Liga II
2	Team2	0	0	0	0	0	0	0	0	Qualification to promotion play-offs
3	Team3	0	0	0	0	0	0	0	0	
4	Team4	0	0	0	0	0	0	0	0	
5	Team5	0	0	0	0	0	0	0	0	
6	Team6	0	0	0	0	0	0	0	0	
7	Team7	0	0	0	0	0	0	0	0	
8	Team8	0	0	0	0	0	0	0	0	

Updated to match(es) played on unknown. Source:
Rules for classification: 1) Points; 2) Points in the regular season; 3) Head-to-head points; 4) Head-to-head goal difference; 5) Head-to-head goals scored;
6) Head-to-head away goals scored; 7) Goal difference (regular season + play off); 8) Goals scored (regular season + play off); 9) Play-off.

=== Series IV ===
Pos	Team	Pld	W	D	L	GF	GA	GD	Pts	Promotion or qualification
1	Team1	0	0	0	0	0	0	0	0	Promotion to Liga II
2	Team2	0	0	0	0	0	0	0	0	Qualification to promotion play-offs
3	Team3	0	0	0	0	0	0	0	0	
4	Team4	0	0	0	0	0	0	0	0	
5	Team5	0	0	0	0	0	0	0	0	
6	Team6	0	0	0	0	0	0	0	0	
7	Team7	0	0	0	0	0	0	0	0	
8	Team8	0	0	0	0	0	0	0	0	

Updated to match(es) played on unknown. Source:
Rules for classification: 1) Points; 2) Points in the regular season; 3) Head-to-head points; 4) Head-to-head goal difference; 5) Head-to-head goals scored;
6) Head-to-head away goals scored; 7) Goal difference (regular season + play off); 8) Goals scored (regular season + play off); 9) Play-off.

== Play-out round ==
=== Series I ===
Pos	Team	Pld	W	D	L	GF	GA	GD	Pts	Qualification or relegation
5	Team1	0	0	0	0	0	0	0	0	
6	Team2	0	0	0	0	0	0	0	0	
7	Team3	0	0	0	0	0	0	0	0	
8	Team4	0	0	0	0	0	0	0	0	
9	Team5	0	0	0	0	0	0	0	0	
10	Team6	0	0	0	0	0	0	0	0	Possible relegation
11	Team7	0	0	0	0	0	0	0	0	Relegation to Liga IV
12	Team8	0	0	0	0	0	0	0	0	Relegation to Liga IV

Updated to match(es) played on unknown. Source:
Rules for classification: 1) Points; 2) Points in the regular season; 3) Head-to-head points; 4) Head-to-head goal difference; 5) Head-to-head goals scored;
6) Head-to-head away goals scored; 7) Goal difference (regular season + play off); 8) Goals scored (regular season + play off); 9) Play-off.

=== Series II ===
Pos	Team	Pld	W	D	L	GF	GA	GD	Pts	Qualification or relegation
5	Team1	0	0	0	0	0	0	0	0	
6	Team2	0	0	0	0	0	0	0	0	
7	Team3	0	0	0	0	0	0	0	0	
8	Team4	0	0	0	0	0	0	0	0	
9	Team5	0	0	0	0	0	0	0	0	
10	Team6	0	0	0	0	0	0	0	0	Possible relegation
11	Team7	0	0	0	0	0	0	0	0	Relegation to Liga IV
12	Team8	0	0	0	0	0	0	0	0	Relegation to Liga IV

Updated to match(es) played on unknown. Source:
Rules for classification: 1) Points; 2) Points in the regular season; 3) Head-to-head points; 4) Head-to-head goal difference; 5) Head-to-head goals scored;
6) Head-to-head away goals scored; 7) Goal difference (regular season + play off); 8) Goals scored (regular season + play off); 9) Play-off.

=== Series III ===
Pos	Team	Pld	W	D	L	GF	GA	GD	Pts	Qualification or relegation
5	Team1	0	0	0	0	0	0	0	0	
6	Team2	0	0	0	0	0	0	0	0	
7	Team3	0	0	0	0	0	0	0	0	
8	Team4	0	0	0	0	0	0	0	0	
9	Team5	0	0	0	0	0	0	0	0	
10	Team6	0	0	0	0	0	0	0	0	Possible relegation
11	Team7	0	0	0	0	0	0	0	0	Relegation to Liga IV
12	Team8	0	0	0	0	0	0	0	0	Relegation to Liga IV

Updated to match(es) played on unknown. Source:
Rules for classification: 1) Points; 2) Points in the regular season; 3) Head-to-head points; 4) Head-to-head goal difference; 5) Head-to-head goals scored;
6) Head-to-head away goals scored; 7) Goal difference (regular season + play off); 8) Goals scored (regular season + play off); 9) Play-off.

=== Series IV ===
Pos	Team	Pld	W	D	L	GF	GA	GD	Pts	Qualification or relegation
5	Team1	0	0	0	0	0	0	0	0	
6	Team2	0	0	0	0	0	0	0	0	
7	Team3	0	0	0	0	0	0	0	0	
8	Team4	0	0	0	0	0	0	0	0	
9	Team5	0	0	0	0	0	0	0	0	
10	Team6	0	0	0	0	0	0	0	0	Possible relegation
11	Team7	0	0	0	0	0	0	0	0	Relegation to Liga IV
12	Team8	0	0	0	0	0	0	0	0	Relegation to Liga IV

Updated to match(es) played on unknown. Source:
Rules for classification: 1) Points; 2) Points in the regular season; 3) Head-to-head points; 4) Head-to-head goal difference; 5) Head-to-head goals scored;
6) Head-to-head away goals scored; 7) Goal difference (regular season + play off); 8) Goals scored (regular season + play off); 9) Play-off.

=== Series V ===
Pos	Team	Pld	W	D	L	GF	GA	GD	Pts	Qualification or relegation
5	Team1	0	0	0	0	0	0	0	0	
6	Team2	0	0	0	0	0	0	0	0	
7	Team3	0	0	0	0	0	0	0	0	
8	Team4	0	0	0	0	0	0	0	0	
9	Team5	0	0	0	0	0	0	0	0	
10	Team6	0	0	0	0	0	0	0	0	Possible relegation
11	Team7	0	0	0	0	0	0	0	0	Relegation to Liga IV
12	Team8	0	0	0	0	0	0	0	0	Relegation to Liga IV

Updated to match(es) played on unknown. Source:
Rules for classification: 1) Points; 2) Points in the regular season; 3) Head-to-head points; 4) Head-to-head goal difference; 5) Head-to-head goals scored;
6) Head-to-head away goals scored; 7) Goal difference (regular season + play off); 8) Goals scored (regular season + play off); 9) Play-off.

=== Series VI ===
Pos	Team	Pld	W	D	L	GF	GA	GD	Pts	Qualification or relegation
5	Team1	0	0	0	0	0	0	0	0	
6	Team2	0	0	0	0	0	0	0	0	
7	Team3	0	0	0	0	0	0	0	0	
8	Team4	0	0	0	0	0	0	0	0	
9	Team5	0	0	0	0	0	0	0	0	
10	Team6	0	0	0	0	0	0	0	0	Possible relegation
11	Team7	0	0	0	0	0	0	0	0	Relegation to Liga IV
12	Team8	0	0	0	0	0	0	0	0	Relegation to Liga IV

Updated to match(es) played on unknown. Source:
Rules for classification: 1) Points; 2) Points in the regular season; 3) Head-to-head points; 4) Head-to-head goal difference; 5) Head-to-head goals scored;
6) Head-to-head away goals scored; 7) Goal difference (regular season + play off); 8) Goals scored (regular season + play off); 9) Play-off.

=== Series VII ===
Pos	Team	Pld	W	D	L	GF	GA	GD	Pts	Qualification or relegation
5	Team1	0	0	0	0	0	0	0	0	
6	Team2	0	0	0	0	0	0	0	0	
7	Team3	0	0	0	0	0	0	0	0	
8	Team4	0	0	0	0	0	0	0	0	
9	Team5	0	0	0	0	0	0	0	0	
10	Team6	0	0	0	0	0	0	0	0	Possible relegation
11	Team7	0	0	0	0	0	0	0	0	Relegation to Liga IV
12	Team8	0	0	0	0	0	0	0	0	Relegation to Liga IV

Updated to match(es) played on unknown. Source:
Rules for classification: 1) Points; 2) Points in the regular season; 3) Head-to-head points; 4) Head-to-head goal difference; 5) Head-to-head goals scored;
6) Head-to-head away goals scored; 7) Goal difference (regular season + play off); 8) Goals scored (regular season + play off); 9) Play-off.

=== Series VIII ===
Pos	Team	Pld	W	D	L	GF	GA	GD	Pts	Qualification or relegation
5	Team1	0	0	0	0	0	0	0	0	
6	Team2	0	0	0	0	0	0	0	0	
7	Team3	0	0	0	0	0	0	0	0	
8	Team4	0	0	0	0	0	0	0	0	
9	Team5	0	0	0	0	0	0	0	0	
10	Team6	0	0	0	0	0	0	0	0	Possible relegation
11	Team7	0	0	0	0	0	0	0	0	Relegation to Liga IV
12	Team8	0	0	0	0	0	0	0	0	Relegation to Liga IV

Updated to match(es) played on unknown. Source:
Rules for classification: 1) Points; 2) Points in the regular season; 3) Head-to-head points; 4) Head-to-head goal difference; 5) Head-to-head goals scored;
6) Head-to-head away goals scored; 7) Goal difference (regular season + play off); 8) Goals scored (regular season + play off); 9) Play-off.

== Promotion play-offs ==
The teams ranked 2nd in the four play-off series will be qualified for the promotion play-offs for the fifth promotion spot and were paired by draw. For each tie, the first team drawn acted as the host of the semi-final while the final while the final will be hosted by the winner of the first semi-final.

=== Semi-finals ===
2nd place Seria I	–	2nd place Seria II

2nd place Seria III	–	2nd place Seria IV

=== Final ===
Semi-finals 1	–	Semi-finals 2

== Possible relegation ==
At the end of the season, a special ranking will be compiled among the teams finishing 10th in each of the eight series in order to determine five additional relegated teams based on the overall ranking. The table will be drawn up by calculating each team's points coefficient, with points divided by the number of matches played throughout the entire season, including both the regular season and the play-out.

== See also ==
- 2026–27 Liga I
- 2026–27 Liga II
- 2026–27 Liga IV
- 2026–27 Cupa României
