= Tineretului Stadium (Curtișoara) =

Multi-use stadium in Curtișoara, Romania

- Interactive map of Tineretului Stadium
- Address: DJ 546
- Location: Curtișoara, Romania
- Coordinates: 44°29′03.8″N 24°19′53.6″E
- Owner: Commune of Curtișoara
- Operator: Oltul Curtișoara
- Capacity: 500 on seats
- Surface: Grass

Construction
- Opened: 2010
- Renovated: 2018–2020

Tenant
- Oltul Curtișoara (2013–present)

The Tineretului Stadium is a multi-use stadium in Curtișoara, Romania. It is used mostly for football matches, is the home ground of Oltul Curtișoara and holds 500 people on seats.
