= Dan Ignat =

Romanian footballer

Personal information
- Full name: Dan Gelu Ignat
- Date of birth: 14 July 1986 (age 40)
- Place of birth: Drobeta-Turnu Severin, Romania
- Height: 1.85 m (6 ft 1 in)
- Position: Centre-back

Team information
- Current team: Oltul Curtișoara (head coach)

Senior career*
Years	Team	Apps	(Gls)
2007–2009	Drobeta	57	(2)
2009–2010	Farul Constanța	12	(0)
2010–2011	Viitorul Constanța	5	(0)
2010—2011	Dacia Unirea Brăila	15	(1)
2011	Olt Piatra-Olt	10	(0)
2012	Turnu Severin		
2012–2014	Dacia Unirea Brăila	43	(0)
2014–2015	Al-Ramtha	24	(1)
2015–2016	Sohar Club	17	(1)
2015–2016	That Ras Club	8	(1)
2016—2017	Shillong Lajong	16	(2)
2017–2018	Mansheyat Bani Hasan	21	(0)
2018–2019	Vllaznia Shkodër	24	(3)
2019–2020	AO Tsilivi		
2020–2021	Pallixouriakos		
2021	Pannaxiakos		
2022–2023	Atlético Pantoja	7	(0)
Total		259+	(11+)

Managerial career
- 2023–: Oltul Curtișoara
- * Club domestic league appearances and goals as of 20:04, 21 December 2024 (UTC)

Dan Gelu Ignat (born 14 July 1986), commonly known as Dan Ignat, is a Romanian former professional footballer who played as a defender for teams such as FC Drobeta, Farul Constanța, Dacia Unirea Brăila, Al-Ramtha or Vllaznia Shkodër, among others.

== Club career ==
=== Romania ===
He began his professional career in 2007 in his hometown, Drobeta-Turnu Severin. In the season207-2008 he played 20 games. Next season 2008-2009 he scored 2 goals in 26 games, one on 20 September 2008 in a 1–1 draw against CSM Râmnicu Vâlcea and another on 26 April 2009 in a 2–1 win over ASA 2013 Târgu Mureș.

In January 2010, he moved to Constanța where he signed a contract with SSC Farul Constanța.

In August 2010, he signed a contract with FC Viitorul Constanța. He made his debut for the club on 18 September 2010 in a 2–2 draw against CSM Ceahlăul Piatra Neamț He also made an appearance in the 2010–11 Cupa României on 22 September 2010 in a 3–2 loss against CS Pandurii Târgu Jiu in the Round of 32.

He later moved to Brăila where he signed a six-month contract with ACS Dacia Unirea Brăila on 15 January 2011. He made his debut for the club on 5 March 2011 in a 3–1 loss against AFC Săgeata Năvodari and scored his first and only goal on 1 June 2011 in a 3–2 win over his former club, Farul Constanța.

Afterwards he transferred to Slatina where he signed a short-term contract with ACS Inter Olt Slatina on 1 August 2011. He made his debut for the club on 20 August 2011 in a 2–1 loss against FC Olt Scornicești.

In January 2012 he returned to Drobeta-Turnu Severin and signed a short-term contract of 6 months with CS Turnu Severin

In July 2012 he returns to Brăila and signed a two-year contract with his former club, ACS Dacia Unirea Brăila. He made his first appearance in the on 1 September 2012 in a 4–2 win over Chindia Târgoviște. In the season 2013–14, he made his first appearance on 7 September 2013 2–2 draw against CS Municipal Unirea Slobozia.

=== Jordan ===
On 24 July 2014 he signed his first contract abroad with Al Ramtha club from Jordan playing 18 games in the championship scored 1 goal and playing another 6 games in the Jordan Cup.

=== Oman ===
In July 2015 he signs in Oman with Sohar Club for a period of 6 months.

=== Jordan ===
In January 2016 he returns to Jordan and signs with That Ras Club.

=== India ===
On 3 January 2017, he signed a six-month contract with I-League side Shillong Lajong FC. He made his I-League debut on 7 January 2017 in a 3–0 loss against defending champions and 2016 AFC Cup finalists, Bengaluru FC.

=== Jordan ===
In August 2017 he returns again to Jordan signing with Mansheyat Bani Hasan a contract for 1 year and plays 21 games.

=== Albania ===
In August 2018 he returns to Europe and signs with KF Vllaznia Shkodër in Albania.

== Honours ==
Shillong Lajong

- Shillong Premier League: 2016
