= Robert Băjan =

Romanian footballer

Personal information
- Full name: Robert Adrian Băjan
- Date of birth: 30 October 1995 (age 31)
- Place of birth: Slatina, Romania
- Height: 1.77 m (5 ft 10 in)
- Position: Right back

Team information
- Current team: Oltul Curtișoara
- Number: 14

Youth career
- 2002–2011: LPS Slatina
- 2011–2012: Farul Constanța

Senior career*
Years	Team	Apps	(Gls)
2012–2016	Farul Constanța	95	(2)
2016–2017	Brașov	22	(0)
2017	ASA Târgu Mureș	19	(3)
2018	Pandurii Târgu Jiu	14	(2)
2018	Viitorul Constanța	0	(0)
2019–2020	Rapid București	9	(0)
2020–2021	Farul Constanța	17	(0)
2021	Unirea Constanța	2	(0)
2022	Gloria Albești	3	(0)
2023–	Oltul Curtișoara	38	(5)

International career^{‡}
2013	Romania U-18	1	(0)
2013–2014	Romania U-19	14	(1)
- * Club domestic league appearances and goals as of 14:23, 24 September 2021 (UTC) ‡ National team caps and goals as of 12 March 2018

Robert Adrian Băjan (born 30 October 1995) is a Romanian professional footballer who plays as a right back for Liga III side Oltul Curtișoara. In his career Băjan also played for FC Brașov, ASA 2013 Târgu Mureș, Pandurii Târgu Jiu, Rapid București or Farul Constanța.

== Honours ==
Rapid București

- Liga III: 2018–19
