= 2025–26 Liga III =

Liga III
- Season: 2025–26

The 2025–26 Liga III, (also known as Superscore Liga 3 for sponsorship reasons), was the 70th season of Liga III, the third tier of the Romanian football league system. The season started on 29 August 2025 and ended on 6 June 2026.

The format was changed to 96 teams, divided into eight series of twelve, played across three phases: a regular season, post-season play-offs and play-outs, and a knockout tournament. In the regular season, each team played 22 matches in a double round-robin format, with the top four teams advancing to the promotion play-offs and the rest entering the play-outs. In the play-offs, teams were paired with those from neighboring series (1–2, 3–4, 5–6, 7–8) and carried over only the points obtained against the other qualified teams from their regular-season series, with the series winners promoted to Liga II and runners-up entering a knockout tournament for the fifth promotion spot. In the play-outs, teams ranked 5th–12th played a single round-robin, carrying over their regular-season points. The bottom two teams in each of the eight series were relegated to Liga IV, along with five additional 10th-placed teams based on the overall ranking.

== Team changes ==
Promoted to Liga II

- Bacău – ended a two-year stay.
- Dinamo București – ended a three-year stay.
- Tunari – ended a one-year stay.
- Gloria Bistrița-Năsăud – ended a seven-year stay.
- Olimpia Satu Mare – ended a five-year stay.

Relegated from Liga II

- FCU 1948 Craiova – returned after six years, having been excluded previously for failing to obtain a second-tier license.
- Dumbrăvița and Câmpulung Muscel – were spared from relegation and admitted to fill the vacant spots in the second tier.
- Focșani – returned after one year; however, it withdrew from the third tier.
- Mioveni and Viitorul Pandurii Târgu Jiu – excluded from the previous second-tier season and not eligible to join the third tier.

Promoted from Liga IV

- Cetatea Suceava
- Bihorul Beiuș
- Unirea Tășnad
- Inter Sibiu
- Săcele
- Hidro Mecanica Șugag 1984
- Unirea DMO Hațeg
- Unirea Sântana
- Târgu Jiu
- Voința Crevedia
- Păușești Otăsău
- Teleajenul Vălenii de Munte
- AXI Adunații-Copăceni
- Progresul Mogoșoaia
- Agigea
- Victoria Traian

Relegated to Liga IV

- Ceahlăul Piatra Neamț II
- Voința Limpeziș
- Medgidia
- Fetești
- Sporting Roșiori
- Sport Team București
- Olimpic Cetate Râșnov
- Ciucaș Tărlungeni
- Avântul Reghin
- Codlea
- Sparta Râmnicu Vâlcea
- Avântul Periam
- Vulturul Mintiu Gherlii
- Diosig Bihardiószeg

Other changes

- Comstar Vaslui, Moldova Cristești, Academica Recea, Zimbrii Lerești and Voința Cudalbi declined promotion.
- USV Iași, Dacia Unirea Brăila, Dunărea Giurgiu, Flacăra Moreni and Gilortul Târgu Cărbunești were spared from relegation.
- Petrolul Potcoava ceded its place to Academica Balș.
- CSM Bacău, Vedița Colonești, Peciu Nou, MSE Târgu Mureș, SR Brașov, Gloria Ultra, ACS FC Dinamo București and Speed Academy Pitești had withdrawn and were formally excluded by the FRF.
- Bacău II, Oțelul Galați II, FCSB II, Universitatea Craiova II, Voluntari II, Dinamo 1948 II and Nanov were invited to fill the vacant spots.
- At the last moment, Sticla Arieșul Turda replaced Gloria Lunca-Teuz Cermei, which, though initially spared from relegation, later withdrew over its assignment to Series VII.

== League map ==
Locations of Liga III clubs by series
Series I Series II Series III Series IV Series V Series VI Series VII Series VIII
Locations of Liga III clubs from Bucharest and the vicinity
Series III Series V

== Regular season ==
=== Series I ===
Pos	Team	Pld	W	D	L	GF	GA	GD	Pts	Qualification
1	Șoimii Gura Humorului	22	17	2	3	55	12	+43	53	Qualification to Play-Off round
2	Cetatea Suceava	22	15	2	5	58	24	+34	47	Qualification to Play-Off round
3	Viitorul Onești	22	10	6	6	34	22	+12	36	Qualification to Play-Off round
4	Știința Miroslava	22	11	3	8	30	33	−3	36	Qualification to Play-Off round
5	Vaslui	22	8	6	8	29	28	+1	30	Qualification to Play-Out round
6	Odorheiu Secuiesc	22	8	6	8	33	35	−2	30	Qualification to Play-Out round
7	Bucovina Rădăuți	22	8	5	9	29	27	+2	29	Qualification to Play-Out round
8	USV Iași	22	8	4	10	28	46	−18	28	Qualification to Play-Out round
9	Aerostar Bacău	22	7	4	11	26	43	−17	25	Qualification to Play-Out round
10	Gheorgheni	22	7	3	12	29	43	−14	24	Qualification to Play-Out round
11	Adjud	22	5	6	11	14	24	−10	21	Qualification to Play-Out round
12	Bacău II	22	3	3	16	27	55	−28	12	Qualification to Play-Out round

Source: FRF (in Romanian)
Rules for classification: 1) Points; 2) Head-to-head points; 3) Head-to-head goal difference; 4) Head-to-head goals scored;
5) Head-to-head away goals scored; 6) Goal difference; 7) Goals scored.

=== Series II ===
Pos	Team	Pld	W	D	L	GF	GA	GD	Pts	Qualification
1	Sporting Liești	22	18	1	3	64	26	+38	55	Qualification to Play-Off round
2	KSE Târgu Secuiesc	22	15	4	3	57	24	+33	49	Qualification to Play-Off round
3	Sepsi OSK Sfântu Gheorghe II	22	13	3	6	55	31	+24	42	Qualification to Play-Off round
4	Blejoi	22	11	5	6	54	26	+28	38	Qualification to Play-Off round
5	Unirea Braniștea	22	12	3	7	51	38	+13	36 (Note: Unirea Braniștea was deducted 3 points and forfeited the away match against Sporting Liești (0–3) in the 4th round after leaving the field.)	Qualification to Play-Out round
6	Păulești	22	9	5	8	34	26	+8	32	Qualification to Play-Out round
7	Plopeni	22	9	4	9	34	32	+2	31	Qualification to Play-Out round
8	Victoria Traian	22	10	1	11	45	51	−6	31	Qualification to Play-Out round
9	Petrolul Ploiești II	22	8	0	14	40	41	−1	24	Qualification to Play-Out round
10	Dacia Unirea Brăila	22	5	2	15	29	68	−39	17	Qualification to Play-Out round
11	Râmnicu Sărat	22	4	2	16	33	72	−39	14	Qualification to Play-Out round
12	Oțelul Galați II	22	2	2	18	26	87	−61	8	Qualification to Play-Out round

Source: FRF (in Romanian)
Rules for classification: 1) Points; 2) Head-to-head points; 3) Head-to-head goal difference; 4) Head-to-head goals scored;
5) Head-to-head away goals scored; 6) Goal difference; 7) Goals scored.

=== Series III ===
Pos	Team	Pld	W	D	L	GF	GA	GD	Pts	Qualification
1	Agricola Borcea	22	15	3	4	51	27	+24	48	Qualification to Play-Off round
2	Popești-Leordeni	22	13	6	3	47	17	+30	45	Qualification to Play-Off round
3	Înainte Modelu	22	14	3	5	51	26	+25	45	Qualification to Play-Off round
4	Dunărea Călărași	22	12	4	6	37	30	+7	40	Qualification to Play-Off round
5	FCSB II	22	12	3	7	52	33	+19	39	Qualification to Play-Out round
6	Progresul Fundulea	22	10	1	11	38	30	+8	31	Qualification to Play-Out round
7	Gloria Băneasa	22	9	2	11	44	47	−3	29	Qualification to Play-Out round
8	Recolta Gheorghe Doja	22	9	0	13	33	44	−11	27	Qualification to Play-Out round
9	Axiopolis Cernavodă	22	7	2	13	31	44	−13	23	Qualification to Play-Out round
10	Agigea	22	7	2	13	26	52	−26	23	Qualification to Play-Out round
11	Dinamo 1948 II	22	6	1	15	32	52	−20	19	Qualification to Play-Out round
12	Voluntari II	22	3	3	16	26	66	−40	12	Qualification to Play-Out round

Source: FRF (in Romanian)
Rules for classification: 1) Points; 2) Head-to-head points; 3) Head-to-head goal difference; 4) Head-to-head goals scored;
5) Head-to-head away goals scored; 6) Goal difference; 7) Goals scored.

=== Series IV ===
Pos	Team	Pld	W	D	L	GF	GA	GD	Pts	Qualification
1	Flacăra Moreni	22	16	4	2	53	19	+34	52	Qualification to Play-Off round
2	Ștefănești	22	15	4	3	54	26	+28	49	Qualification to Play-Off round
3	Olimpic Zărnești	22	12	6	4	59	37	+22	42	Qualification to Play-Off round
4	Urban Titu (Note: The 5th-placed Tricolorul Breaza advanced to the play-off, as the 4th-placed Urban Titu did not meet the requirements to participate and did not pay the required fine.)	22	8	5	9	30	37	−7	29	Qualification to Play-Out round
5	Tricolorul Breaza	22	8	4	10	27	37	−10	28	Qualification to Play-Off round
6	Teleajenul Vălenii de Munte	22	7	7	8	26	38	−12	28	Qualification to Play-Out round
7	Săcele	22	7	4	11	29	38	−9	25	Qualification to Play-Out round
8	Băicoi	22	6	7	9	24	33	−9	25	Qualification to Play-Out round
9	Progresul Mogoșoaia	22	7	3	12	30	34	−4	24	Qualification to Play-Out round
10	Voința Crevedia	22	6	5	11	24	35	−11	23	Qualification to Play-Out round
11	Kids Tâmpa Brașov	22	6	5	11	28	40	−12	23	Qualification to Play-Out round
12	Pucioasa	22	6	2	14	29	39	−10	20	Qualification to Play-Out round

Source: FRF (in Romanian)
Rules for classification: 1) Points; 2) Head-to-head points; 3) Head-to-head goal difference; 4) Head-to-head goals scored;
5) Head-to-head away goals scored; 6) Goal difference; 7) Goals scored.

=== Series V ===
Pos	Team	Pld	W	D	L	GF	GA	GD	Pts	Qualification
1	Universitatea Craiova II	20	15	4	1	37	16	+21	49	Qualification to Play-Off round
2	Cetatea Turnu Măgurele	20	12	7	1	41	19	+22	43	Qualification to Play-Off round
3	Academica Balș	20	12	5	3	35	18	+17	41	Qualification to Play-Off round
4	Clinceni	20	12	3	5	44	19	+25	39	Qualification to Play-Off round
5	Alexandria	20	10	6	4	35	19	+16	36	Qualification to Play-Out round
6	Oltul Curtișoara	20	8	4	8	28	31	−3	28	Qualification to Play-Out round
7	Progresul Spartac București	20	8	2	10	33	33	0	26	Qualification to Play-Out round
8	Dunărea Giurgiu	20	5	2	13	19	38	−19	17	Qualification to Play-Out round
9	AXI Arena	20	4	1	15	16	36	−20	13	Qualification to Play-Out round
10	Filiași	20	3	2	15	15	42	−27	11	Qualification to Play-Out round
11	Nanov	20	2	2	16	13	45	−32	8	Qualification to Play-Out round
12	FCU 1948 Craiova (Note: FCU 1948 Craiova was deducted 106 points due to unpaid debts. Subsequently, on 10 September 2025, it was excluded and all its results were canceled. At the time, they were ranked 12th with 0 wins, 1 draws, 1 losses, 0–6 goals, and -105 points (after the deduction).) (D)	0	0	0	0	0	0	0	0	Excluded

Source: FRF (in Romanian)
Rules for classification: 1) Points; 2) Head-to-head points; 3) Head-to-head goal difference; 4) Head-to-head goals scored;
5) Head-to-head away goals scored; 6) Goal difference; 7) Goals scored.
(D) Disqualified

=== Series VI ===
Pos	Team	Pld	W	D	L	GF	GA	GD	Pts	Qualification
1	Râmnicu Vâlcea	22	16	5	1	55	20	+35	53	Qualification to Play-Off round
2	Minerul Lupeni	22	12	4	6	33	23	+10	40	Qualification to Play-Off round
3	Vulturii Fărcășești	22	11	5	6	52	41	+11	38	Qualification to Play-Off round
4	Jiul Petroșani	22	10	7	5	35	22	+13	37	Qualification to Play-Off round
5	Mediaș	22	11	4	7	47	35	+12	37	Qualification to Play-Out round
6	Păușești-Otăsău	22	9	3	10	30	43	−13	30	Qualification to Play-Out round
7	Inter Sibiu	22	8	4	10	31	35	−4	28	Qualification to Play-Out round
8	ARO Muscelul Câmpulung	22	6	9	7	34	33	+1	27	Qualification to Play-Out round
9	Târgu Jiu	22	7	6	9	26	33	−7	27	Qualification to Play-Out round
10	Unirea Bascov	22	6	5	11	33	37	−4	23	Qualification to Play-Out round
11	Viitorul Dăești	22	2	9	11	31	47	−16	15	Qualification to Play-Out round
12	Gilortul Târgu Cărbunești	22	2	3	17	15	53	−38	9	Qualification to Play-Out round

Source: FRF (in Romanian)
Rules for classification: 1) Points; 2) Head-to-head points; 3) Head-to-head goal difference; 4) Head-to-head goals scored;
5) Head-to-head away goals scored; 6) Goal difference; 7) Goals scored.

=== Series VII ===
Pos	Team	Pld	W	D	L	GF	GA	GD	Pts	Qualification
1	Unirea Alba Iulia	22	18	2	2	71	12	+59	56	Qualification to Play-Off round
2	Știința Poli Timișoara	22	16	4	2	51	11	+40	52	Qualification to Play-Off round
3	Viitorul Arad	22	13	1	8	37	23	+14	40	Qualification to Play-Off round
4	Metalurgistul Cugir	22	12	4	6	38	25	+13	40	Qualification to Play-Off round
5	Unirea Sântana	22	11	4	7	28	28	0	37	Qualification to Play-Out round
6	Ghiroda	22	11	3	8	33	29	+4	36	Qualification to Play-Out round
7	Progresul Pecica	22	9	4	9	33	34	−1	31	Qualification to Play-Out round
8	CIL Blaj	22	9	1	12	28	35	−7	28	Qualification to Play-Out round
9	CSU Alba Iulia	22	8	1	13	33	41	−8	25	Qualification to Play-Out round
10	Timișul Șag	22	6	3	13	31	45	−14	21	Qualification to Play-Out round
11	Unirea DMO Hațeg	22	4	2	16	19	48	−29	14	Qualification to Play-Out round
12	Hidro Mecanica Șugag 1984 (Note: Hidro Mecanica Șugag 1984 withdrew after 17 rounds and lost all matches from the second half by 0–3. At the time, they were ranked 12th with 0 wins, 2 draws, 15 losses, 12–72 goals, and 2 points.)	22	0	1	21	7	78	−71	1	Qualification to Play-Out round

Source: FRF (in Romanian)
Rules for classification: 1) Points; 2) Head-to-head points; 3) Head-to-head goal difference; 4) Head-to-head goals scored;
5) Head-to-head away goals scored; 6) Goal difference; 7) Goals scored.

=== Series VIII ===
Pos	Team	Pld	W	D	L	GF	GA	GD	Pts	Qualification
1	Minaur Baia Mare	22	15	2	5	46	27	+19	47	Qualification to Play-Off round
2	Unirea Tășnad	22	14	4	4	54	23	+31	46	Qualification to Play-Off round
3	Sănătatea Cluj	22	13	7	2	38	13	+25	46	Qualification to Play-Off round
4	Zalău	22	13	5	4	37	18	+19	44	Qualification to Play-Off round
5	Crișul Sântandrei	22	12	5	5	39	24	+15	41	Qualification to Play-Out round
6	Sighetu Marmației	22	10	7	5	36	22	+14	37	Qualification to Play-Out round
7	Lotus Băile Felix	22	8	7	7	32	26	+6	31	Qualification to Play-Out round
8	Viitorul Cluj	22	5	6	11	22	26	−4	21	Qualification to Play-Out round
9	Unirea Dej	22	5	3	14	25	35	−10	18	Qualification to Play-Out round
10	Bihorul Beiuș	22	4	6	12	22	39	−17	18	Qualification to Play-Out round
11	Olimpia MCMXXI Satu Mare	22	5	2	15	21	62	−41	17	Qualification to Play-Out round
12	Sticla Arieșul Turda (Note: Sticla Arieșul Turda was excluded after 19 rounds due to two no-shows and lost all matches from the second half by 0–3. At the time, they were ranked 12th with 0 wins, 2 draws, 17 losses, 11–53 goals, and 2 points.)	22	0	2	20	8	65	−57	2	Qualification to Play-Out round

Source: FRF (in Romanian)
Rules for classification: 1) Points; 2) Head-to-head points; 3) Head-to-head goal difference; 4) Head-to-head goals scored;
5) Head-to-head away goals scored; 6) Goal difference; 7) Goals scored.

== Play-off round ==
=== Series I ===
Pos	Team	Pld	W	D	L	GF	GA	GD	Pts	Promotion or qualification
1	Cetatea Suceava (C, P)	8	8	0	0	24	7	+17	34	Promotion to Liga II
2	Șoimii Gura Humorului	8	5	3	0	20	8	+12	31	Qualification to promotion play-offs
3	Sporting Liești	8	3	1	4	12	14	−2	25	
4	KSE Târgu Secuiesc	8	1	5	2	11	12	−1	19	
5	Viitorul Onești	8	3	2	3	6	7	−1	18	
6	Știința Miroslava	8	4	1	3	14	13	+1	17	
7	Sepsi OSK Sfântu Gheorghe II	8	1	0	7	6	20	−14	8	
8	Blejoi	8	1	0	7	6	18	−12	5	

Source: FRF (in Romanian)
Rules for classification: 1) Points; 2) Points in the regular season; 3) Head-to-head points; 4) Head-to-head goal difference; 5) Head-to-head goals scored;
6) Head-to-head away goals scored; 7) Goal difference (regular season + play off); 8) Goals scored (regular season + play off); 9) Play-off.
(C) Champions; (P) Promoted

=== Series II ===
Pos	Team	Pld	W	D	L	GF	GA	GD	Pts	Promotion or qualification
1	Ștefănești	8	5	1	2	14	7	+7	29	Promotion to Liga II
2	Popești-Leordeni	8	6	2	0	18	7	+11	29	Qualification to promotion play-offs
3	Flacăra Moreni	8	3	2	3	19	19	0	23	
4	Agricola Borcea	8	3	1	4	25	17	+8	18	
5	Olimpic Zărnești	8	3	2	3	17	19	−2	18	
6	Înainte Modelu	8	2	2	4	9	13	−4	17	
7	Tricolorul Breaza	8	2	2	4	10	17	−7	11	
8	Dunărea Călărași	8	1	2	5	10	23	−13	10	

Source: FRF (in Romanian)
Rules for classification: 1) Points; 2) Points in the regular season; 3) Head-to-head points; 4) Head-to-head goal difference; 5) Head-to-head goals scored;
6) Head-to-head away goals scored; 7) Goal difference (regular season + play off); 8) Goals scored (regular season + play off); 9) Play-off.

=== Series III ===
Pos	Team	Pld	W	D	L	GF	GA	GD	Pts	Promotion or qualification
1	Râmnicu Vâlcea (C, P)	8	6	2	0	21	6	+15	34	Promotion to Liga II
2	Minerul Lupeni	8	6	2	0	16	1	+15	27	Qualification to promotion play-offs
3	Universitatea Craiova II	8	2	5	1	13	11	+2	25	
4	Cetatea Turnu Măgurele	8	3	0	5	9	15	−6	18	
5	Jiul Petroșani	8	2	2	4	8	9	−1	16	
6	Vulturii Fărcășești	8	3	1	4	14	18	−4	14	
7	Academica Balș	8	2	0	6	7	14	−7	11	
8	Clinceni	8	1	2	5	5	19	−14	8	

Source: FRF (in Romanian)
Rules for classification: 1) Points; 2) Points in the regular season; 3) Head-to-head points; 4) Head-to-head goal difference; 5) Head-to-head goals scored;
6) Head-to-head away goals scored; 7) Goal difference (regular season + play off); 8) Goals scored (regular season + play off); 9) Play-off.
(C) Champions; (P) Promoted

=== Series IV ===
Pos	Team	Pld	W	D	L	GF	GA	GD	Pts	Promotion or qualification
1	Politehnica Timișoara (C, P)	8	6	1	1	11	4	+7	32	Promotion to Liga II
2	Unirea Alba Iulia	8	5	2	1	16	4	+12	27	Qualification to promotion play-offs
3	Sănătatea Cluj	8	4	1	3	11	7	+4	24	
4	Zalău	8	5	1	2	11	5	+6	24	
5	Minaur Baia Mare	8	3	2	3	13	10	+3	18	
6	Unirea Tășnad	8	3	2	3	10	18	−8	18	
7	Metalurgistul Cugir	8	0	3	5	9	18	−9	12	
8	Viitorul Arad	8	0	0	8	4	19	−15	3	

Source: FRF (in Romanian)
Rules for classification: 1) Points; 2) Points in the regular season; 3) Head-to-head points; 4) Head-to-head goal difference; 5) Head-to-head goals scored;
6) Head-to-head away goals scored; 7) Goal difference (regular season + play off); 8) Goals scored (regular season + play off); 9) Play-off.
(C) Champions; (P) Promoted

== Play-out round ==
=== Series I ===
Pos	Team	Pld	W	D	L	GF	GA	GD	Pts	Qualification or relegation
5	Vaslui	7	3	2	2	10	9	+1	41	
6	Odorheiu Secuiesc	7	2	4	1	16	11	+5	40	
7	USV Iași	7	2	3	2	10	14	−4	37	
8	Bucovina Rădăuți	7	2	1	4	13	10	+3	36	
9	Aerostar Bacău	7	3	1	3	15	17	−2	35 (Note: Aerostar Bacău are ahead of Adjud on points from the regular season.)	
10	Adjud	7	4	2	1	11	5	+6	35	Possible relegation
11	Gheorgheni (R)	7	3	1	3	8	11	−3	34	Relegation to Liga IV
12	Bacău II (R)	7	2	0	5	11	17	−6	14	Relegation to Liga IV

Source: FRF (in Romanian)
Rules for classification: 1) Points; 2) Points in the regular season; 3) Head-to-head points; 4) Head-to-head goal difference; 5) Head-to-head goals scored;
6) Head-to-head away goals scored; 7) Goal difference (regular season + play out); 8) Goals scored (regular season + play out); 9) Play-out.
(R) Relegated

=== Series II ===
Pos	Team	Pld	W	D	L	GF	GA	GD	Pts	Qualification or relegation
5	Unirea Braniștea	7	5	0	2	17	5	+12	48	
6	Victoria Traian	7	2	4	1	9	8	+1	41	
7	Păulești	7	2	2	3	13	16	−3	40 (Note: Păulești are ahead of Petrolul Ploiești II on points from the regular season.)	
8	Petrolul Ploiești II	7	5	1	1	19	7	+12	40	
9	Plopeni	7	2	1	4	9	9	0	38	
10	Dacia Unirea Brăila (R)	7	1	3	3	10	18	−8	23 (Note: Dacia Unirea Brăila are ahead of Râmnicu Sărat on points from the regular season.)	Possible relegation
11	Râmnicu Sărat (R)	7	2	3	2	15	13	+2	23	Relegation to Liga IV
12	Oțelul Galați II (R)	7	1	2	4	10	26	−16	13	Relegation to Liga IV

Source: FRF (in Romanian)
Rules for classification: 1) Points; 2) Points in the regular season; 3) Head-to-head points; 4) Head-to-head goal difference; 5) Head-to-head goals scored;
6) Head-to-head away goals scored; 7) Goal difference (regular season + play out); 8) Goals scored (regular season + play out); 9) Play-out.
(R) Relegated

=== Series III ===
Pos	Team	Pld	W	D	L	GF	GA	GD	Pts	Qualification or relegation
5	FCSB II	7	4	2	1	13	6	+7	53	
6	Progresul Fundulea	7	7	0	0	24	5	+19	52	
7	Recolta Gheorghe Doja	7	4	1	2	17	20	−3	40	
8	Axiopolis Cernavodă	7	4	2	1	18	10	+8	37	
9	Gloria Băneasa	7	1	1	5	6	14	−8	33	
10	Agigea (R)	7	1	2	4	3	9	−6	28	Possible relegation
11	Dinamo 1948 II (R)	7	1	2	4	8	14	−6	24	Relegation to Liga IV
12	Voluntari II (R)	7	1	0	6	6	17	−11	15	Relegation to Liga IV

Source: FRF (in Romanian)
Rules for classification: 1) Points; 2) Points in the regular season; 3) Head-to-head points; 4) Head-to-head goal difference; 5) Head-to-head goals scored;
6) Head-to-head away goals scored; 7) Goal difference (regular season + play out); 8) Goals scored (regular season + play out); 9) Play-out.
(R) Relegated

=== Series IV ===
Pos	Team	Pld	W	D	L	GF	GA	GD	Pts	Qualification or relegation
5	Voința Crevedia	7	5	2	0	15	4	+11	40	
6	Băicoi	7	4	0	3	14	12	+2	37	
7	Progresul Mogoșoaia	7	4	0	3	10	12	−2	36 (Note: Progresul Mogoșoaia are ahead of Kids Tâmpa Brașov on points from the regular season.)	
8	Kids Tâmpa Brașov	7	4	1	2	8	4	+4	36	
9	Săcele	7	2	3	2	12	8	+4	34	
10	Urban Titu	7	1	1	5	3	11	−8	33	Possible relegation
11	Teleajenul Vălenii de Munte (R)	7	1	1	5	9	19	−10	32	Relegation to Liga IV
12	Pucioasa (R)	7	3	0	4	9	10	−1	29	Relegation to Liga IV

Source: FRF (in Romanian)
Rules for classification: 1) Points; 2) Points in the regular season; 3) Head-to-head points; 4) Head-to-head goal difference; 5) Head-to-head goals scored;
6) Head-to-head away goals scored; 7) Goal difference (regular season + play out); 8) Goals scored (regular season + play out); 9) Play-out.
(R) Relegated

=== Series V ===
Pos	Team	Pld	W	D	L	GF	GA	GD	Pts	Qualification or relegation
5	Oltul Curtișoara	6	5	1	0	12	3	+9	44	
6	Alexandria	6	2	1	3	8	9	−1	43	
7	Progresul Spartac București	6	3	0	3	17	8	+9	35	
8	Dunărea Giurgiu	6	3	1	2	11	7	+4	27	
9	AXI Arena	6	3	0	3	8	13	−5	22	
10	Filiași (R)	6	2	0	4	5	11	−6	17	Possible relegation
11	Nanov (R)	6	1	1	4	5	15	−10	12	Relegation to Liga IV
12	FCU 1948 Craiova (Note: FCU 1948 Craiova was excluded in the first stage of the season.) (D)	0	0	0	0	0	0	0	0	Excluded

Source: FRF (in Romanian)
Rules for classification: 1) Points; 2) Points in the regular season; 3) Head-to-head points; 4) Head-to-head goal difference; 5) Head-to-head goals scored;
6) Head-to-head away goals scored; 7) Goal difference (regular season + play out); 8) Goals scored (regular season + play out); 9) Play-out.
(D) Disqualified; (R) Relegated

=== Series VI ===
Pos	Team	Pld	W	D	L	GF	GA	GD	Pts	Qualification or relegation
5	Mediaș	7	4	1	2	13	8	+5	50	
6	ARO Muscelul Câmpulung	7	6	0	1	22	6	+16	45	
7	Târgu Jiu	7	5	1	1	13	8	+5	43	
8	Inter Sibiu	7	4	0	3	14	10	+4	40	
9	Păușești-Otăsău	7	3	0	4	11	11	0	39	
10	Unirea Bascov (R)	7	3	0	4	12	8	+4	32	Possible relegation
11	Viitorul Dăești (R)	7	1	1	5	6	18	−12	19	Relegation to Liga IV
12	Gilortul Târgu Cărbunești (R)	7	0	1	6	3	25	−22	10	Relegation to Liga IV

Source: FRF (in Romanian)
Rules for classification: 1) Points; 2) Points in the regular season; 3) Head-to-head points; 4) Head-to-head goal difference; 5) Head-to-head goals scored;
6) Head-to-head away goals scored; 7) Goal difference (regular season + play out); 8) Goals scored (regular season + play out); 9) Play-out.
(R) Relegated

=== Series VII ===
Pos	Team	Pld	W	D	L	GF	GA	GD	Pts	Qualification or relegation
5	Unirea Sântana	6	4	2	0	13	5	+8	51	
6	Ghiroda	6	2	2	2	10	8	+2	44	
7	Progresul Pecica	6	2	1	3	13	12	+1	38	
8	CIL Blaj	6	1	3	2	3	7	−4	34 (Note: CIL Blaj are ahead of CSU Alba Iulia, who are ahead of Timișul Șag on points from the regular season.)	
9	CSU Alba Iulia	6	2	3	1	14	10	+4	34	
10	Timișul Șag	6	4	1	1	10	9	+1	34	Possible relegation
11	Unirea DMO Hațeg (R)	6	0	0	6	4	16	−12	14	Relegation to Liga IV
12	Hidro Mecanica Șugag 1984 (Note: Hidro Mecanica Șugag 1984 withdrew in the first stage of the season.) (D)	0	0	0	0	0	0	0	0	Withdrew

Source: FRF (in Romanian)
Rules for classification: 1) Points; 2) Points in the regular season; 3) Head-to-head points; 4) Head-to-head goal difference; 5) Head-to-head goals scored;
6) Head-to-head away goals scored; 7) Goal difference (regular season + play out); 8) Goals scored (regular season + play out); 9) Play-out.
(D) Disqualified; (R) Relegated

=== Series VIII ===
Pos	Team	Pld	W	D	L	GF	GA	GD	Pts	Qualification or relegation
5	Crișul Sântandrei	6	3	0	3	13	10	+3	50	
6	Lotus Băile Felix	6	4	2	0	9	2	+7	45	
7	Sighetu Marmației	6	1	3	2	8	8	0	43	
8	Bihorul Beiuș	6	5	1	0	11	4	+7	34	
9	Viitorul Cluj	6	2	2	2	7	9	−2	29	
10	Unirea Dej (R)	6	1	2	3	4	8	−4	23	Possible relegation
11	Olimpia MCMXXI Satu Mare (R)	6	0	0	6	4	15	−11	17	Relegation to Liga IV
12	Sticla Arieșul Turda (Note: Sticla Arieșul Turda was excluded in the first stage of the season.) (D)	0	0	0	0	0	0	0	0	Excluded

Source: FRF (in Romanian)
Rules for classification: 1) Points; 2) Points in the regular season; 3) Head-to-head points; 4) Head-to-head goal difference; 5) Head-to-head goals scored;
6) Head-to-head away goals scored; 7) Goal difference (regular season + play out); 8) Goals scored (regular season + play out); 9) Play-out.
(D) Disqualified; (R) Relegated

== Promotion play-offs ==
The teams ranked 2nd in the four play-off series qualified for the promotion play-offs for the fifth promotion spot and were paired by draw, which took place on 25 May 2026. For each tie, the first team drawn acted as the host of the semi-final. The semi-finals are scheduled for 30 May 2026, while the final is set to take place on 6 June 2026 and will be hosted by the winner of the first semi-final.

=== Semi-finals ===
30 May 2026	Popești-Leordeni	3–2	Șoimii Gura Humorului	Popești-Leordeni
17:30 EEST (UTC+3)	Alexandru Dane 12'; Alexandru Dane 55'; Andrei Sin 78'	Report	Lóránd Fülöp 72'; Cătălin Golofca 86'	Stadium: Inter Gaz Stadium; Referee: Vlad Baban

30 May 2026	Minerul Lupeni	0–3	Unirea Alba Iulia	Lupeni
17:30 EEST (UTC+3)		Report	Cornel Ardei 31'; Denis Giosu 65'; Alexandru Giurgiu 78'	Stadium: Minerul; Referee: Ionuț Coza

=== Final ===
6 June 2026	Popești-Leordeni	2–0	Unirea Alba Iulia	Popești-Leordeni
17:30 EEST (UTC+3)	Luca Pătrășcoiu 36'; Mihai Ion 83'	Report		Stadium: Inter Gaz Stadium; Referee: Florin Andrei (Târgu Mureș)

== Possible relegation ==
At the end of the season, a special ranking was compiled among the teams finishing 10th in each of the eight series in order to determine five additional relegated teams based on the overall ranking. The table was drawn up by calculating each team’s points coefficient, with points divided by the number of matches played throughout the entire season, including both the regular season and the play-out.

Pos	Team	Pld	Pts	PPG	Relegation
1	Timișul Șag	28	34	1.214	
2	Adjud	29	35	1.206	
3	Urban Titu	29	33	1.137	
4	Unirea Bascov	29	32	1.103	Relegation to Liga IV
5	Agigea	29	28	0.965	Relegation to Liga IV
6	Unirea Dej	28	23	0.821	Relegation to Liga IV
7	Dacia Unirea Brăila	29	23	0.793	Relegation to Liga IV
8	Filiași	26	17	0.653	Relegation to Liga IV

== See also ==
- 2025–26 Liga I
- 2025–26 Liga II
- 2025–26 Liga IV
- 2025–26 Cupa României
