= 2026–27 Liga IV =

84th season of Romanian football league

Liga IV
- Season: 2026–27

The 2026–27 Liga IV is the 85th season of the Liga IV, the fourth tier of the Romanian football league system. The champions of each county association will play against a team from a neighboring county in a play-off to gain promotion to Liga III. The counties were divided into seven regions, each consisting of six counties. The draw for the promotion play-offs is scheduled to take place in February 2027.

== County leagues ==
North–East

- Bacău (BC)
- Botoșani (BT)
- Iași (IS)
- Neamț (NT)
- Suceava (SV)
- Vaslui (VS)

North–West

- Bihor (BH)
- Bistrița-Năsăud (BN)
- Cluj (CJ)
- Maramureș (MM)
- Satu Mare (SM)
- Sălaj (SJ)

Center

- Alba (AB)
- Brașov (BV)
- Covasna (CV)
- Harghita (HR)
- Mureș (MS)
- Sibiu (SB)

West

- Arad (AR)
- Caraș-Severin (CS)
- Gorj (GJ)
- Hunedoara (HD)
- Mehedinți (MH)
- Timiș (TM)

South–West

- Argeș (AG)
- Dâmbovița (DB)
- Dolj (DJ)
- Olt (OT)
- Teleorman (TR)
- Vâlcea (VL)

South

- Bucharest (B)
- Călărași (CL)
- Giurgiu (GR)
- Ialomița (IL)
- Ilfov (IF)
- Prahova (PH)

South–East

- Brăila (BR)
- Buzău (BZ)
- Constanța (CT)
- Galați (GL)
- Tulcea (TL)
- Vrancea (VN)

== Promotion play-off ==
The matches are scheduled to be played in June 2026.

Team 1	Agg.	Team 2	1st leg	2nd leg
Region 1 (North-East)				
	–		–	–
	–		–	–
	–		–	–
Region 2 (North-West)				
	–		–	–
	–		–	–
	–		–	–
Region 3 (Center)				
	–		–	–
	–		–	–
	–		–	–
Region 4 (West)				
	–		–	–
	–		–	–
	–		–	–
Region 5 (South-West)				
	–		–	–
	–		–	–
	–		–	–
Region 6 (South)				
	–		–	–
	–		–	–
	–		–	–
Region 7 (South-East)				
	–		–	–
	–		–	–
	–		–	–

== Leagues standings ==
=== Alba County ===
Team changes from the previous season

- Sportul Câmpeni (12th place) and Viitorul Vama Seacă (13th place; withdrew) were relegated to Liga V Alba.
- Academia Șona (winners) was promoted from Liga V Alba.
- CS Zlatna, Fortuna Lunca Mureșului, AFC Micești and ACS Oiejdea withdrew.
- CSM Sebeș and CSM Aiud were admitted upon request.

Pos	Team	Pld	W	D	L	GF	GA	GD	Pts	Qualification
1	Industria Galda	12	10	2	0	38	8	+30	32	Qualification to championship play-off
2	Viitorul Sântimbru	12	10	1	1	41	14	+27	31	Qualification to championship play-off
3	Sebeș	12	7	3	2	26	13	+13	24	Qualification to championship play-off
4	Ocna Mureș	12	6	3	3	31	23	+8	21	Qualification to championship play-off
5	Valea Frumoasei	12	6	2	4	28	19	+9	20	Qualification to championship play-out
6	Performanța Ighiu	12	3	2	7	20	27	−7	11	Qualification to championship play-out
7	Academia Șona	12	3	0	9	18	48	−30	9	Qualification to championship play-out
8	Inter Unirea	12	1	5	6	12	24	−12	8	Qualification to championship play-out
9	Aiud	12	2	2	8	13	29	−16	8	Qualification to championship play-out
10	Spicul Daia Română	12	0	4	8	12	34	−22	4	Qualification to championship play-out

Updated to match(es) played on 14 November 2026. Source:
Rules for classification: 1) Points; 2) Head-to-head points; 3) Head-to-head goal difference; 4) Head-to-head goals scored; 5) Head-to-head away goals scored; 6) Goal difference; 7) Goals scored.

Championship play-off

Pos	Team	Pld	W	D	L	GF	GA	GD	Pts	Qualification
1	Team1	0	0	0	0	0	0	0	0	Qualification to promotion play-off
2	Team2	0	0	0	0	0	0	0	0	
3	Team3	0	0	0	0	0	0	0	0	
4	Team4	0	0	0	0	0	0	0	0	

First match(es) will be played: 2027. Source:
Rules for classification: 1) Points; 2) Head-to-head points; 3) Head-to-head goal difference; 4) Head-to-head goals scored; 5) Head-to-head away goals scored; 6) Goal difference; 7) Goals scored.

Championship play-out

Pos	Team	Pld	W	D	L	GF	GA	GD	Pts	Relegation
5	Team1	0	0	0	0	0	0	0	0	
6	Team2	0	0	0	0	0	0	0	0	
7	Team3	0	0	0	0	0	0	0	0	
8	Team4	0	0	0	0	0	0	0	0	
9	Team5	0	0	0	0	0	0	0	0	Relegation to Liga V Alba
10	Team6	0	0	0	0	0	0	0	0	Relegation to Liga V Alba

First match(es) will be played: 2027. Source:
Rules for classification: 1) Points; 2) Head-to-head points; 3) Head-to-head goal difference; 4) Head-to-head goals scored; 5) Head-to-head away goals scored; 6) Goal difference; 7) Goals scored.

=== Arad County ===
The Liga IV Arad County is played in a double round-robin regular season, followed by a championship play-off for the top six teams and a play-out for the bottom six teams, both played in a single round-robin format.

Team changes from the previous season

- Progresul Pecica II (12th place) and Victoria Nădlac (13th place; withdrew) were relegated to Liga V Arad.
- Mureșul Zădăreni (Series A winners) and Victoria Ineu (Series C winners) were promoted from Liga V Arad.
- CS Șofronea (Series B winners) declined promotion from Liga V Arad.
- Athletico Vinga withdrew.
- Podgoria Pâncota was renamed Șoimii Pâncota.

Pos	Team	Pld	W	D	L	GF	GA	GD	Pts	Qualification or relegation (Note: Teams are split into two groups (play-off and play-out) after each have played 22 matches.)
1	Victoria Felnac	9	8	1	0	36	12	+24	25	Qualification to promotion play-off
2	Socodor	9	6	3	0	22	13	+9	21	
3	Frontiera Curtici	9	6	2	1	19	13	+6	20	
4	Olimpia Bocsig	9	5	2	2	23	14	+9	17	
5	Șoimii Pâncota	9	4	3	2	21	13	+8	15	
6	Șoimii Șimand	9	3	2	4	20	23	−3	11	
7	Vladimirescu	9	3	2	4	14	17	−3	11	
8	Național Sebiș	9	3	1	5	20	18	+2	10	
9	Șiriana Șiria	9	2	3	4	15	14	+1	9	
10	Victoria Ineu	9	2	1	6	14	20	−6	7	
11	Mureșul Zădăreni	9	1	1	7	12	27	−15	4	Relegation to Liga V Arad
12	Voința Macea	9	0	1	8	5	37	−32	1	Relegation to Liga V Arad

Updated to match(es) played on 17 October 2026. Source: AJF Arad
Rules for classification: 1) Points; 2) Head-to-head points; 3) Head-to-head goal difference; 4) Head-to-head goals scored; 5) Head-to-head away goals scored; 6) Goal difference; 7) Goals scored.

=== Argeș County ===
Team changes from the previous season

- Petrolul Hârtiești achieved promotion to Liga III.
- AS Ciofrângeni (North Series winners) and Real Bradu (South Series winners) declined promotion from Liga V Argeș.
- FC Pitești 2008 withdrew.
- Victoria Buzoești, Muntenia Poiana, and Energia Stolnici were admitted upon request.

Pos	Team	Pld	W	D	L	GF	GA	GD	Pts	Qualification
1	Star Mioveni	8	8	0	0	58	1	+57	24	Qualification to championship play-off
2	Domnești	7	6	0	1	27	10	+17	18	Qualification to championship play-off
3	Suseni	7	4	2	1	23	12	+11	14	Qualification to championship play-off
4	Muntenia Poiana	7	4	1	2	29	23	+6	13	Qualification to championship play-off
5	DLR Pitești	8	4	0	4	19	16	+3	12	Qualification to championship play-off
6	Budeasa Academie	7	3	1	3	11	14	−3	10	Qualification to championship play-off
7	Albota 2012	7	2	1	4	14	26	−12	7	Qualification to championship play-out
8	Energia Stolnici	7	2	1	4	14	31	−17	7	Qualification to championship play-out
9	Young Boys Topoloveni	8	2	0	6	13	22	−9	6	Qualification to championship play-out
10	Zimbrii Lerești	7	1	0	6	10	26	−16	3	Qualification to championship play-out
11	Victoria Buzoești	7	1	0	6	14	51	−37	3	Qualification to championship play-out

Updated to match(es) played on 17 October 2026. Source:
Rules for classification: 1) Points; 2) Head-to-head points; 3) Head-to-head goal difference; 4) Head-to-head goals scored; 5) Head-to-head away goals scored; 6) Goal difference; 7) Goals scored.

Championship play-off

Pos	Team	Pld	W	D	L	GF	GA	GD	Pts	Qualification
1	Team1	0	0	0	0	0	0	0	0	Qualification to promotion play-off
2	Team2	0	0	0	0	0	0	0	0	
3	Team3	0	0	0	0	0	0	0	0	
4	Team4	0	0	0	0	0	0	0	0	
5	Team5	0	0	0	0	0	0	0	0	
6	Team6	0	0	0	0	0	0	0	0	

First match(es) will be played: 2027. Source:
Rules for classification: 1) Points; 2) Head-to-head points; 3) Head-to-head goal difference; 4) Head-to-head goals scored; 5) Head-to-head away goals scored; 6) Goal difference; 7) Goals scored.

Championship play-out

Pos	Team	Pld	W	D	L	GF	GA	GD	Pts	Relegation
7	Team1	0	0	0	0	0	0	0	0	
8	Team2	0	0	0	0	0	0	0	0	
9	Team3	0	0	0	0	0	0	0	0	
10	Team4	0	0	0	0	0	0	0	0	
11	Team5	0	0	0	0	0	0	0	0	Relegation to Liga V Argeș

First match(es) will be played: 2027. Source:
Rules for classification: 1) Points; 2) Head-to-head points; 3) Head-to-head goal difference; 4) Head-to-head goals scored; 5) Head-to-head away goals scored; 6) Goal difference; 7) Goals scored.

=== Bacău County ===
The Liga IV Bacău County is played in a single round-robin regular season featuring twenty-two teams, followed by a double round-robin championship play-off for the top four teams and a single round-robin play-out for the remaining eighteen teams, split into three groups of six. Points and goal difference are carried over from the regular season, with the ten teams with the lowest points totals in the overall play-out standings directly relegated.

Team changes from the previous season

- AFC Bubu and CS Bârsănești withdrew.
- Siretu Săucești and Bamirom Dumbrăveni withdrew in the previous season.
- Elite Onești, Viitorul Căiuți, Forestierul Agăș and CSO Buhuși were admitted upon request.

Pos	Team	Pld	W	D	L	GF	GA	GD	Pts	Qualification
1	Gauss Bacău	8	7	1	0	44	10	+34	22	Qualification to championship play-off
2	Negri	8	7	1	0	31	7	+24	22	Qualification to championship play-off
3	Vulturul Măgirești	8	7	0	1	45	8	+37	21	Qualification to championship play-off
4	Elite Onești	8	7	0	1	30	6	+24	21	Qualification to championship play-off
5	Măgura Cașin	8	6	2	0	29	7	+22	20	Qualification to championship play-out Group A
6	Buhuși	8	5	1	2	17	9	+8	16	Qualification to championship play-out Group B
7	Uzu Dărmănești	8	4	2	2	20	8	+12	14	Qualification to championship play-out Group C
8	Sportul Horgești	8	4	1	3	19	10	+9	13	Qualification to championship play-out Group A
9	Dofteana	8	4	0	4	21	23	−2	12	Qualification to championship play-out Group B
10	Viitorul Nicolae Bălcescu	8	3	2	3	19	30	−11	11	Qualification to championship play-out Group C
11	Faraoani	7	3	1	3	16	10	+6	10	Qualification to championship play-out Group A
12	Moinești	7	3	1	3	12	11	+1	10	Qualification to championship play-out Group B
13	Flamura Roșie Sascut	8	3	1	4	8	16	−8	10	Qualification to championship play-out Group C
14	Unirea Bacău	8	3	0	5	11	24	−13	9	Qualification to championship play-out Group A
15	Bradul Mănăstirea Cașin	8	2	1	5	9	18	−9	7	Qualification to championship play-out Group B
16	Voința Bacău	8	2	1	5	20	30	−10	7	Qualification to championship play-out Group C
17	Gloria Zemeș	8	2	0	6	20	24	−4	6	Qualification to championship play-out Group A
18	Viitorul Căiuți	8	2	0	6	8	22	−14	6	Qualification to championship play-out Group B
19	Forestierul Agăș	8	2	0	6	14	42	−28	6	Qualification to championship play-out Group C
20	Recolta Urechești	6	1	0	5	3	15	−12	3	Qualification to championship play-out Group A
21	Măgura Târgu Ocna	8	1	0	7	12	53	−41	3	Qualification to championship play-out Group B
22	Viitorul Dămienești	8	0	1	7	5	30	−25	1	Qualification to championship play-out Group C

Updated to match(es) played on 18 October 2026. Source:
Rules for classification: 1) Points; 2) Head-to-head points; 3) Head-to-head goal difference; 4) Head-to-head goals scored; 5) Head-to-head away goals scored; 6) Goal difference; 7) Goals scored.

Championship play-off

Pos	Team	Pld	W	D	L	GF	GA	GD	Pts	Qualification
1	Team1	0	0	0	0	0	0	0	0	Qualification to promotion play-off
2	Team2	0	0	0	0	0	0	0	0	
3	Team3	0	0	0	0	0	0	0	0	
4	Team4	0	0	0	0	0	0	0	0	

First match(es) will be played: 2027. Source:
Rules for classification: 1) Points; 2) Points in the regular season; 3) Head-to-head points; 4) Head-to-head goal difference; 5) Head-to-head goals scored;
6) Head-to-head away goals scored; 7) Goal difference (regular season + play off); 8) Goals scored (regular season + play off).

Championship play-out
Group A

Pos	Team	Pld	W	D	L	GF	GA	GD	Pts
1	Team1	0	0	0	0	0	0	0	0
2	Team2	0	0	0	0	0	0	0	0
3	Team3	0	0	0	0	0	0	0	0
4	Team4	0	0	0	0	0	0	0	0
5	Team5	0	0	0	0	0	0	0	0
6	Team6	0	0	0	0	0	0	0	0

First match(es) will be played: 2026. Source:
Rules for classification: 1) Points; 2) Points in the regular season; 3) Head-to-head points; 4) Head-to-head goal difference; 5) Head-to-head goals scored;
6) Head-to-head away goals scored; 7) Goal difference (regular season + play off); 8) Goals scored (regular season + play off); 9) Play-off.

Group B

Pos	Team	Pld	W	D	L	GF	GA	GD	Pts
1	Team1	0	0	0	0	0	0	0	0
2	Team2	0	0	0	0	0	0	0	0
3	Team3	0	0	0	0	0	0	0	0
4	Team4	0	0	0	0	0	0	0	0
5	Team5	0	0	0	0	0	0	0	0
6	Team6	0	0	0	0	0	0	0	0

First match(es) will be played: 2026. Source:
Rules for classification: 1) Points; 2) Points in the regular season; 3) Head-to-head points; 4) Head-to-head goal difference; 5) Head-to-head goals scored;
6) Head-to-head away goals scored; 7) Goal difference (regular season + play off); 8) Goals scored (regular season + play off); 9) Play-off.

Group C

Pos	Team	Pld	W	D	L	GF	GA	GD	Pts
1	Team1	0	0	0	0	0	0	0	0
2	Team2	0	0	0	0	0	0	0	0
3	Team3	0	0	0	0	0	0	0	0
4	Team4	0	0	0	0	0	0	0	0
5	Team5	0	0	0	0	0	0	0	0
6	Team6	0	0	0	0	0	0	0	0

First match(es) will be played: 2026. Source:
Rules for classification: 1) Points; 2) Points in the regular season; 3) Head-to-head points; 4) Head-to-head goal difference; 5) Head-to-head goals scored;
6) Head-to-head away goals scored; 7) Goal difference (regular season + play off); 8) Goals scored (regular season + play off); 9) Play-off.

=== Bihor County ===
Team changes from the previous season

- Transilvania Sport Academy achieved promotion to Liga III.
- Voința Cheresig (16th place) was relegated to Liga V Bihor.
- Nojorid Livada (15th place) was spared relegation.
- Vulturii Tineri Săcueni (Series I winners) and Viitorul Dobrești (Series II runners-up (Note: Zorile Buntești (Series II winners) declined promotion)) were promoted from Liga V Bihor.

Pos	Team	Pld	W	D	L	GF	GA	GD	Pts	Qualification
1	Foresta Tileagd	7	5	2	0	16	3	+13	17	Qualification to championship play-off
2	Vadu Crișului	7	5	2	0	17	5	+12	17	Qualification to championship play-off
3	Vulturii Tineri Săcueni	7	5	0	2	19	10	+9	15	Qualification to championship play-off
4	Oșorhei	6	4	2	0	27	6	+21	14	Qualification to championship play-off
5	Universitatea Oradea	7	4	1	2	25	9	+16	13	Qualification to championship play-off
6	Victoria Avram Iancu	7	4	1	2	17	10	+7	13	Qualification to championship play-off
7	CA Oradea	6	3	2	1	22	8	+14	11	Qualification to championship play-out
8	Unirea Valea lui Mihai	7	3	1	3	13	12	+1	10	Qualification to championship play-out
9	Izvorul Cociuba Mare	7	2	2	3	11	24	−13	8	Qualification to championship play-out
10	Olimpia Salonta	7	2	0	5	16	11	+5	6	Qualification to championship play-out
11	Ștei	7	1	3	3	12	16	−4	6	Qualification to championship play-out
12	Nojorid Livada	6	1	0	5	6	13	−7	3	Qualification to championship play-out
13	Crișul Aleșd	6	0	0	6	6	22	−16	0	Qualification to championship play-out
14	Viitorul Dobrești	7	0	0	7	3	61	−58	0	Qualification to championship play-out

Updated to match(es) played on 18 October 2026. Source:
Rules for classification: 1) Points; 2) Head-to-head points; 3) Head-to-head goal difference; 4) Head-to-head goals scored; 5) Head-to-head away goals scored; 6) Goal difference; 7) Goals scored.

Championship play-off

Pos	Team	Pld	W	D	L	GF	GA	GD	Pts	Qualification
1	Team1	0	0	0	0	0	0	0	0	Qualification to promotion play-off
2	Team2	0	0	0	0	0	0	0	0	
3	Team3	0	0	0	0	0	0	0	0	
4	Team4	0	0	0	0	0	0	0	0	
5	Team5	0	0	0	0	0	0	0	0	
6	Team6	0	0	0	0	0	0	0	0	

First match(es) will be played: 2026. Source:
Rules for classification: 1) Points; 2) Points in the regular season; 3) Head-to-head points; 4) Head-to-head goal difference; 5) Head-to-head goals scored;
6) Head-to-head away goals scored; 7) Goal difference (regular season + play-off); 8) Goals scored (regular season + play-off); 9) Play-off.

Championship play-out

Pos	Team	Pld	W	D	L	GF	GA	GD	Pts	Relegation
7	Team1	0	0	0	0	0	0	0	0	
8	Team2	0	0	0	0	0	0	0	0	
9	Team3	0	0	0	0	0	0	0	0	
10	Team4	0	0	0	0	0	0	0	0	
11	Team5	0	0	0	0	0	0	0	0	
12	Team6	0	0	0	0	0	0	0	0	
13	Team7	0	0	0	0	0	0	0	0	Relegation to Liga V Bihor
14	Team8	0	0	0	0	0	0	0	0	Relegation to Liga V Bihor

First match(es) will be played: 2026. Source:
Rules for classification: 1) Points; 2) Points in the regular season; 3) Head-to-head points; 4) Head-to-head goal difference; 5) Head-to-head goals scored;
6) Head-to-head away goals scored; 7) Goal difference (regular season + play-out); 8) Goals scored (regular season + play-out); 9) Play-out.

=== Bistrița-Năsăud County ===
Team changes from the previous season

- Dinamo Uriu (12th place; withdrew) was relegated to Liga V Bistrița-Năsăud.
- Sportul Beclean (11th place) was spared from relegation.
- Voința Matei (winners) was promoted from Liga V Bistrița-Năsăud.
- Gloria Bistrița II was admitted upon request.

Pos	Team	Pld	W	D	L	GF	GA	GD	Pts	Qualification or relegation
1	Viitorul Livezile	7	7	0	0	34	8	+26	21	Qualification to promotion play-off
2	Atletico Monor	6	6	0	0	32	3	+29	18	
3	Minerul Rodna	7	6	0	1	31	12	+19	18	
4	Progresul Năsăud	6	4	0	2	20	8	+12	12	
5	Silvicultorul Maieru	6	4	0	2	22	11	+11	12	
6	Gloria Bistrița II	7	3	2	2	18	12	+6	11	
7	Hebe Sângeorz-Băi	6	3	0	3	15	7	+8	9	
8	Prosomeș Feldru	6	2	1	3	11	15	−4	7	
9	Eciro Forest Telciu	6	1	1	4	7	16	−9	4	
10	Real Teaca	7	1	1	5	10	32	−22	4	
11	Sportul Beclean	7	1	1	5	6	32	−26	4	
12	Săgeata Dumbrăvița	7	1	0	6	11	28	−17	3	
13	Voința Matei	6	0	0	6	2	35	−33	0	Relegation to Liga V Bistrița-Năsăud

Updated to match(es) played on 18 October 2026. Source:
Rules for classification: 1) Points; 2) Head-to-head points; 3) Head-to-head goal difference; 4) Head-to-head goals scored; 5) Head-to-head away goals scored; 6) Goal difference; 7) Goals scored.

=== Botoșani County ===
Team changes from the previous season

- Speranța Dumbrăvița (13th place) and ACS Epureni (14th place; withdrew) were relegated to Liga V Botoșani.
- Gloria Dorohoi (North Series runners-up) and Grănicerii Românești (South Series runners-up) were promoted from Liga V Botoșani.
- Prosport Gloria Vârfu Câmpului was renamed Gloria Vârfu Câmpului.

Pos	Team	Pld	W	D	L	GF	GA	GD	Pts	Qualification or relegation
1	Nord Păltiniș	11	10	0	1	44	12	+32	30	Qualification to promotion play-off
2	Gloria Dorohoi	11	9	1	1	48	4	+44	28	
3	Unirea Curtești	11	8	1	2	43	15	+28	25	
4	Pro Vorona	11	8	0	3	43	22	+21	24	
5	Gloria Vârfu Câmpului	11	7	2	2	31	12	+19	23	
6	Bucecea	11	6	0	5	27	24	+3	18	
7	Sportivul Trușești	11	4	2	5	22	34	−12	14	
8	Grănicerii Românești	11	4	1	6	22	27	−5	13	
9	Voința Șendriceni	11	3	3	5	20	20	0	12	
10	Sulița	11	3	1	7	29	46	−17	10	
11	Partizanul Tudora	11	3	0	8	28	49	−21	9	
12	Inter Dorohoi	11	2	3	6	15	37	−22	9	
13	Viitorul Borzești	11	1	1	9	8	38	−30	4	Relegation to Liga V Botoșani
14	Sportul Flămânzi	11	1	1	9	15	55	−40	4	Relegation to Liga V Botoșani

Updated to match(es) played on 25 October 2026. Source:
Rules for classification: 1) Points; 2) Head-to-head points; 3) Head-to-head goal difference; 4) Head-to-head goals scored; 5) Head-to-head away goals scored; 6) Goal difference; 7) Goals scored.

=== Brăila County ===
The Liga IV Brăila County is played in a double round-robin regular season featuring twelve teams, followed by a double round-robin championship play-off for the top four teams and a single round-robin play-out for the remaining eight teams.

Team changes from the previous season

- Victoria Traian withdrew from Liga III.
- Viitorul Cireșu (Series II winners) was promoted from Liga V Brăila.
- AFC Urleasca (Series I winners) declined promotion from Liga V Brăila.
- Viitorul Însurăței was spared relegation.
- CSL Mircea Vodă was admitted upon request.
- Suporter Club Brăila was renamed SC Progresul Brăila.

Pos	Team	Pld	W	D	L	GF	GA	GD	Pts	Qualification
1	Victoria Traian	10	8	1	1	36	11	+25	25	Qualification to championship play-off
2	Viitorul Ianca	10	7	3	0	34	10	+24	24	Qualification to championship play-off
3	Daous Dava 2018 Brăila	10	7	0	3	44	17	+27	21	Qualification to championship play-off
4	Viitorul Cireșu	10	6	2	2	25	11	+14	20	Qualification to championship play-off
5	Viitorul Galbenu	9	5	1	3	23	19	+4	16	Qualification to championship play-out
6	Cazasu	10	5	0	5	28	26	+2	15	Qualification to championship play-out
7	Mircea Vodă	9	4	1	4	31	20	+11	13	Qualification to championship play-out
8	Viitorul Însurăței	10	4	0	6	29	29	0	12	Qualification to championship play-out
9	Făurei	10	3	2	5	21	26	−5	11	Qualification to championship play-out
10	Progresul Brăila	9	2	1	6	23	42	−19	7	Qualification to championship play-out
11	Tricolorul Viziru	10	1	1	8	16	36	−20	4	Qualification to championship play-out
12	Șoimii Tudor Vladimirescu	9	0	0	9	6	69	−63	0	Qualification to championship play-out

Updated to match(es) played on 7 November 2026. Source:
Rules for classification: 1) Points; 2) Head-to-head points; 3) Head-to-head goal difference; 4) Head-to-head goals scored; 5) Head-to-head away goals scored; 6) Goal difference; 7) Goals scored.

Championship play-off

Pos	Team	Pld	W	D	L	GF	GA	GD	Pts	Qualification
1	Team1	0	0	0	0	0	0	0	0	Qualification to promotion play-off
2	Team2	0	0	0	0	0	0	0	0	
3	Team3	0	0	0	0	0	0	0	0	
4	Team4	0	0	0	0	0	0	0	0	

First match(es) will be played: 2027. Source:
Rules for classification: 1) Points; 2) Head-to-head points; 3) Head-to-head goal difference; 4) Head-to-head goals scored; 5) Head-to-head away goals scored; 6) Goal difference; 7) Goals scored.

Championship play-out

Pos	Team	Pld	W	D	L	GF	GA	GD	Pts	Relegation
5	Team1	0	0	0	0	0	0	0	0	
6	Team2	0	0	0	0	0	0	0	0	
7	Team3	0	0	0	0	0	0	0	0	
8	Team4	0	0	0	0	0	0	0	0	
9	Team5	0	0	0	0	0	0	0	0	
10	Team6	0	0	0	0	0	0	0	0	
11	Team7	0	0	0	0	0	0	0	0	Relegation to Liga V Brăila
12	Team8	0	0	0	0	0	0	0	0	Relegation to Liga V Brăila

First match(es) will be played: 2027. Source:
Rules for classification: 1) Points; 2) Head-to-head points; 3) Head-to-head goal difference; 4) Head-to-head goals scored; 5) Head-to-head away goals scored; 6) Goal difference; 7) Goals scored.

=== Brașov County ===
Team changes from the previous season

- Corona Brașov achieved promotion to Liga III.
- ACS Hălchiu (13th place; withdrew) and Carpați Berivoi (14th place; withdrew) were relegated to Liga V Brașov.
- Internațional Brașov (Brașov Zone winners) and Zona Rupea (Făgăraș Zone winners) were promoted from Liga V Brașov.
- Colțea Brașov withdrew.
- Corona Brașov II was admitted upon request.

Pos	Team	Pld	W	D	L	GF	GA	GD	Pts	Qualification or relegation
1	Chimia Orașul Victoria	8	7	0	1	20	10	+10	21	Qualification to promotion play-off
2	Măgura Codlea	8	6	1	1	32	8	+24	19	
3	Internațional Brașov	8	5	2	1	12	5	+7	17	
4	SR Brașov	9	5	1	3	22	13	+9	16	
5	Zona Rupea	8	5	1	2	16	13	+3	16	
6	Corona Brașov II	8	4	2	2	19	11	+8	14	
7	Făgăraș	8	4	2	2	14	11	+3	14	
8	Teutonii Ghimbav	8	3	2	3	15	10	+5	11	
9	Aripile Brașov	9	3	0	6	14	20	−6	9	
10	Inter Cristian	8	2	0	6	14	24	−10	6	
11	Unirea Hărman	9	2	0	7	12	24	−12	6	
12	Hoghiz	9	1	1	7	12	35	−23	4	
13	Prejmer	8	1	0	7	11	29	−18	3	Relegation to Liga V Brașov

Updated to match(es) played on 24 October 2026. Source:
Rules for classification: 1) Points; 2) Head-to-head points; 3) Head-to-head goal difference; 4) Head-to-head goals scored; 5) Head-to-head away goals scored; 6) Goal difference; 7) Goals scored.

=== Bucharest ===
The Liga IV Bucharest is played in a double round-robin format featuring fourteen teams, with each team playing every other team twice over 26 rounds. The team finishing first is declared champion and qualifies for the promotion play-offs for Liga III, representing Bucharest subject to meeting the eligibility criteria established by the Romanian Football Federation. The teams finishing 13th and 14th are relegated to Liga V Bucharest.

Team changes from the previous season

- Omega Sport București achieved promotion to Liga III.
- International București Pantere (13th place) and Alexandru Văidean (14th place) were relegated to Liga V Bucharest.
- Progresul București 2005 (winners) and Automatica București (runners-up) were promoted from Liga V Bucharest.
- Daco-Getica București was taken over by CS Oxigen București, which obtained a place in Liga III.
- Juniorul 2014 București, Pro Team București and Rapid FNG București withdrew.
- Herea Football Academy, Team Școala Mea, and Lions București were admitted upon request.

Pos	Team	Pld	W	D	L	GF	GA	GD	Pts	Qualification or relegation
1	Știința București	6	6	0	0	46	3	+43	18	Qualification to promotion play-off
2	Herea Football Academy	6	4	1	1	22	10	+12	13	
3	Academia Germană	5	4	0	1	23	6	+17	12	
4	Sportul D&A București	5	3	0	2	12	13	−1	9	
5	Dan Chilom	5	3	0	2	15	17	−2	9	
6	Astra Kids	5	3	0	2	9	11	−2	9	
7	Progresul București 2005	5	2	2	1	21	19	+2	8	
8	Metaloglobus București II	6	2	1	3	15	12	+3	7	
9	Romprim București	5	2	1	2	12	14	−2	7	
10	Adrian Mutu	5	2	1	2	11	13	−2	7	
11	Automatica București	5	1	0	4	5	14	−9	3	
12	Team Școala Mea	5	1	0	4	7	18	−11	3	
13	Real New București	5	1	0	4	13	32	−19	3	Relegation to Liga V Bucharest
14	Lions București	6	0	0	6	6	35	−29	0	Relegation to Liga V Bucharest

Updated to match(es) played on 9 October 2026. Source:
Rules for classification: 1) Points; 2) Head-to-head points; 3) Head-to-head goal difference; 4) Head-to-head goals scored; 5) Head-to-head away goals scored; 6) Goal difference; 7) Goals scored.

=== Buzău County ===
The Liga IV Buzău County was played in a regular season contested by sixteen teams in a single round-robin format, followed by a championship play-off with the top eight teams and a championship play-out with the bottom eight, both played in a double round-robin format. Teams will enter these stages with all points accumulated during the regular season, with no other records carried over.

Team changes from the previous season

- Petrolul Berca achieved promotion to Liga III.
- Recolta Cislău (14th place) and ASC Vernești (16th place; withdrew) were relegated to Liga V Buzău.
- Unirea Mărăcineni (Series I winners), Luceafarul Maxenu (Series II winners) and Viitorul Valea Râmnicului (Series III 3rd place (Note: Victoria Grebanu (Series III winners) and Voința Cochirleanca (Series III runners-up)) were not eligible for promotion.)) were promoted from Liga V Buzău.
- Șoimii Siriu (15th place) was spared from relegation.

Pos	Team	Pld	W	D	L	GF	GA	GD	Pts	Qualification
1	Montana Pătârlagele	7	6	1	0	28	8	+20	19	Qualification to championship play-off
2	Știința Cernătești	7	6	0	1	32	7	+25	18	Qualification to championship play-off
3	Carpați Nehoiu	7	4	3	0	25	8	+17	15	Qualification to championship play-off
4	Team Săgeata	7	5	0	2	25	18	+7	15	Qualification to championship play-off
5	Gloria Vadu Pașii	7	4	2	1	23	16	+7	14	Qualification to championship play-off
6	Unirea Mărăcineni	7	3	2	2	17	15	+2	11	Qualification to championship play-off
7	Recolta Sălcioara	7	3	1	3	16	22	−6	10	Qualification to championship play-off
8	Luceafărul Maxenu	7	2	2	3	15	16	−1	8	Qualification to championship play-off
9	Viitorul Valea Râmnicului	7	2	2	3	14	17	−3	8	Qualification to championship play-out
10	Viitorul Gherăseni	7	2	1	4	10	13	−3	7	Qualification to championship play-out
11	Pescărușul Luciu	6	2	1	3	12	16	−4	7	Qualification to championship play-out
12	Avântul Glodeanu-Siliștea	7	1	2	4	15	16	−1	5	Qualification to championship play-out
13	Voința Limpeziș	6	1	2	3	8	16	−8	5	Qualification to championship play-out
14	Voința Lanurile	7	1	2	4	7	16	−9	5	Qualification to championship play-out
15	Șoimii Siriu	7	1	1	5	4	19	−15	4	Qualification to championship play-out
16	Unirea Stâlpu	7	0	2	5	5	33	−28	2	Qualification to championship play-out

Updated to match(es) played on 10 October 2026. Source:
Rules for classification: 1) Points; 2) Head-to-head points; 3) Head-to-head goal difference; 4) Head-to-head goals scored; 5) Head-to-head away goals scored; 6) Goal difference; 7) Goals scored.

Championship play-off

Pos	Team	Pld	W	D	L	GF	GA	GD	Pts	Qualification
1	Team1	0	0	0	0	0	0	0	0	Qualification to promotion play-off
2	Team2	0	0	0	0	0	0	0	0	
3	Team3	0	0	0	0	0	0	0	0	
4	Team4	0	0	0	0	0	0	0	0	
5	Team5	0	0	0	0	0	0	0	0	
6	Team6	0	0	0	0	0	0	0	0	
7	Team7	0	0	0	0	0	0	0	0	
8	Team8	0	0	0	0	0	0	0	0	

First match(es) will be played: 2027. Source:
Rules for classification: 1) Points; 2) Head-to-head points; 3) Head-to-head goal difference; 4) Head-to-head goals scored; 5) Head-to-head away goals scored; 6) Goal difference; 7) Goals scored.

Championship play-out

Pos	Team	Pld	W	D	L	GF	GA	GD	Pts	Relegation
9	Team1	0	0	0	0	0	0	0	0	
10	Team2	0	0	0	0	0	0	0	0	
11	Team3	0	0	0	0	0	0	0	0	
12	Team4	0	0	0	0	0	0	0	0	
13	Team5	0	0	0	0	0	0	0	0	
14	Team6	0	0	0	0	0	0	0	0	Relegation to Liga V Buzău
15	Team7	0	0	0	0	0	0	0	0	Relegation to Liga V Buzău
16	Team8	0	0	0	0	0	0	0	0	Relegation to Liga V Buzău

First match(es) will be played: 2027. Source:
Rules for classification: 1) Points; 2) Head-to-head points; 3) Head-to-head goal difference; 4) Head-to-head goals scored; 5) Head-to-head away goals scored; 6) Goal difference; 7) Goals scored.

=== Caraș-Severin County ===
Team changes from the previous season

- Nera Bogodinț achieved promotion to Liga III.
- Voința Vrani (14th place; withdrew) was relegated to Liga V Caraș-Severin.
- Berzobis Berzovia (winners) was promoted from Liga V Caraș-Severin.
- Voința Răcășdia (runners-up) declined promotion from Liga V Caraș-Severin.
- Prolaz Carașova and CS Moldova Nouă withdrew.
- CSO Anina (13th place) was spared relegation.

Pos	Team	Pld	W	D	L	GF	GA	GD	Pts	Qualification or relegation (Note: After 20 matches, the top four teams qualify for the championship play-off.)
1	Caransebeș	6	6	0	0	37	1	+36	18	Qualification to promotion play-off
2	Dalboșeț	7	5	1	1	21	18	+3	16	
3	Minerul Sasca Montană	6	4	0	2	26	13	+13	12	
4	Narcisa Zervești	6	3	1	2	15	16	−1	10	
5	Voința Șoșdea	6	3	0	3	19	10	+9	9	
6	Anina	6	3	0	3	9	21	−12	9	
7	Viitorul Armeniș	7	2	2	3	11	16	−5	8	
8	Minerul Dognecea	7	2	1	4	12	14	−2	7	
9	Oravița	6	2	0	4	7	23	−16	6	
10	Nera Bozovici	7	1	1	5	9	26	−17	4	
11	Berzobis Berzovia	6	1	0	5	6	14	−8	3	Relegation to Liga V Caraș-Severin

Updated to match(es) played on 18 October 2026. Source:
Rules for classification: 1) Points; 2) Head-to-head points; 3) Head-to-head goal difference; 4) Head-to-head goals scored; 5) Head-to-head away goals scored; 6) Goal difference; 7) Goals scored.

=== Călărași County ===
Team changes from the previous season

- AS Gâldău (13th place) and Viitorul Dragoș Vodă[ (14th place; withdrew) were relegated to Liga V Călărași.
- Rapid Răzvani (West Series winners) was promoted from Liga V Călărași.
- Sportul Ștefănești (East Series winners) declined promotion from Liga V Călărași.

Pos	Team	Pld	W	D	L	GF	GA	GD	Pts	Qualification or relegation
1	Oltenița	6	6	0	0	37	1	+36	18	Qualification to promotion play-off
2	Dunărea Grădiștea	6	5	0	1	21	18	+3	15	
3	Spicul Vâlcelele	5	4	0	1	20	8	+12	12	
4	Zarea Cuza Vodă	6	3	1	2	16	10	+6	10	
5	Voința Chiselet	6	3	1	2	16	17	−1	10	
6	Roseți	6	3	0	3	16	14	+2	9	
7	Victoria Lehliu	5	2	2	1	16	10	+6	8	
8	Rapid Răzvani	6	2	0	4	11	21	−10	6	
9	Victoria Chirnogi	5	1	2	2	9	15	−6	5	
10	Steaua Radovanu	5	1	1	3	7	10	−3	4	
11	Unirea Mânăstirea	5	1	1	3	8	15	−7	4	
12	Dunărea Ciocănești	6	1	0	5	5	22	−17	3	
13	Gloria Fundeni	5	0	0	5	7	28	−21	0	Relegation to Liga V Călărași

Updated to match(es) played on 17 October 2026. Source:
Rules for classification: 1) Points; 2) Head-to-head points; 3) Head-to-head goal difference; 4) Head-to-head goals scored; 5) Head-to-head away goals scored; 6) Goal difference; 7) Goals scored.

=== Cluj County ===
Team changes from the previous season

- Viitorul Rugășești (Dej Zone winners), Vasile Moga Apahida (Cluj Zone Group I winners) and Juniorul Cluj (Cluj Zone Group II winners) were promoted from Liga V Cluj.
- Progresul Nireș (Gherla Zone winners) and Amicii Turda (Câmpia Turzii Zone Cluj winners) declined promotion from Liga V Cluj.
- Atletic Olimpia Gherla, Avântul Suatu Vaida-Cămăraș and Academia Florești withdrew.
- Vulturul Mintiu Gherlii, Sport Cluj 2012 and CSM Turda were admitted upon request.

Pos	Team	Pld	W	D	L	GF	GA	GD	Pts	Qualification or relegation (Note: Teams are split into two groups (play-off and play-out) after each have played 22 matches.)
1	Victoria Viișoara	9	7	2	0	38	10	+28	23	Qualification to promotion play-off
2	Vulturul Mintiu Gherlii	10	7	0	3	29	14	+15	21	
3	Sporting Cluj-Napoca	9	5	3	1	24	18	+6	18	
4	Arieșul Mihai Viteazu	9	5	2	2	26	17	+9	17	
5	Someșul Gilău	9	5	2	2	21	14	+7	17	
6	Vasile Moga Apahida	9	3	5	1	18	18	0	14	
7	Sănătatea Cluj II	9	4	1	4	28	21	+7	13	
8	Turda	10	3	2	5	22	20	+2	11	
9	Juniorul Cluj	9	3	1	5	26	23	+3	10	
10	Viitorul Mihai Georgescu	9	3	1	5	14	21	−7	10	
11	Viitorul Gârbău	9	1	3	5	6	21	−15	6	
12	Viitorul Rugășești	9	1	2	6	12	41	−29	5	
13	Sport Cluj 2012	10	1	0	9	10	36	−26	3	

Updated to match(es) played on 8 November 2026. Source:
Rules for classification: 1) Points; 2) Head-to-head points; 3) Head-to-head goal difference; 4) Head-to-head goals scored; 5) Head-to-head away goals scored; 6) Goal difference; 7) Goals scored.

=== Constanța County ===
Team changes from the previous season

- Portul Constanța achieved promotion to Liga III.
- Viitorul Hârșova (14th place), Știința ACALAB Poarta Albă (15th place) and CS Mihail Kogălniceanu (16th place) were relegated to Liga V Constanța.
- CS Medgidia (West Series winners) was promoted from Liga V Constanța.
- Tricolorul Săcele (North Series winners) declined promotion from Liga V Constanța.
- Sparta Techirghiol II (South Series winners) did not have the right for promotion from Liga V Constanța.
- CS Lumina and Viitorul Cobadin withdrew.
- Constructorul Constanța, CS Agigea II, Galata Constanța and Atletic Cobadin were admitted upon request.

Pos	Team	Pld	W	D	L	GF	GA	GD	Pts	Qualification or relegation
1	Constructorul Constanța	8	6	1	1	40	13	+27	19	Qualification to promotion play-off
2	Năvodari	8	6	1	1	30	7	+23	19	
3	Sparta Techirghiol	8	6	1	1	30	10	+20	19	
4	Victoria Cumpăna	8	5	2	1	18	9	+9	17	
5	Murfatlar	8	5	1	2	34	22	+12	16	
6	Medgidia	7	5	0	2	21	5	+16	15	
7	Poseidon Limanu	7	4	1	2	14	10	+4	13	
8	Agigea II	7	4	1	2	9	10	−1	13	
9	Galata Constanța	8	3	1	4	28	20	+8	10	
10	Constructorul Topraisar	8	3	1	4	21	32	−11	10	
11	Gloria Albești	7	2	0	5	9	20	−11	6	
12	Atletic Cobadin	7	1	1	5	12	42	−30	4	
13	Aurora 23 August	7	0	1	6	5	17	−12	1	
14	Ovidiu	7	0	0	7	6	24	−18	0	Relegation to Liga V Constanța
15	Eforie	7	0	0	7	7	43	−36	0	Relegation to Liga V Constanța

Updated to match(es) played on 17 October 2026. Source:
Rules for classification: 1) Points; 2) Head-to-head points; 3) Head-to-head goal difference; 4) Head-to-head goals scored; 5) Head-to-head away goals scored; 6) Goal difference; 7) Goals scored.

=== Covasna County ===
Team changes from the previous season

- Carpați Covasna achieved promotion to Liga III.
- Progresul Chichiș and Tineretul Hăghig were admitted upon request.

Pos	Team	Pld	W	D	L	GF	GA	GD	Pts	Qualification or relegation
1	Baraolt	7	7	0	0	44	7	+37	21	Qualification to promotion play-off
2	Stăruința Zagon	6	6	0	0	21	7	+14	18	
3	Progresul Sita Buzăului	6	5	0	1	11	5	+6	15	
4	Viitorul Amo Barcani	7	5	0	2	11	16	−5	15	
5	Prima Brăduț	6	4	0	2	26	12	+14	12	
6	Arcuș	7	4	0	3	17	14	+3	12	
7	Catalina	7	3	2	2	19	12	+7	11	
8	Harghita Aita Mare	6	3	1	2	17	11	+6	10	
9	Progresul Chichiș	7	3	0	4	13	18	−5	9	
10	Tineretul Hăghig	6	2	1	3	13	13	0	7	
11	Păpăuți	7	2	1	4	18	19	−1	7	
12	Ciucaș Întorsura Buzăului	7	2	0	5	14	35	−21	6	
13	Perkö Sânzieni	7	1	1	5	23	20	+3	4	
14	Venus Ozun	6	1	0	5	10	31	−21	3	
15	Cernat	7	1	0	6	13	38	−25	3	
16	Moacșa	7	0	2	5	10	22	−12	2	

Updated to match(es) played on 18 October 2026. Source:
Rules for classification: 1) Points; 2) Head-to-head points; 3) Head-to-head goal difference; 4) Head-to-head goals scored; 5) Head-to-head away goals scored; 6) Goal difference; 7) Goals scored.

=== Dâmbovița County ===
Team changes from the previous season

- Roberto Ziduri (12th place and promotion/relegation play-offs losers), Ravens Corbii Mari (13th place), AFC 1948 Brezoaele (14th place) and Flacăra Șuța Seacă (14th place) were relegated to Liga V Dâmbovița
- ACS Malu cu Flori (North Series winners), AFC Găești (South Series winners) Valahii 1456 Târgoviște (North Series runners-up and promotion/relegation play-offs winners) and Olimpia Picior de Munte (South Series runners-up and promotion/relegation play-offs winners) were promoted from Liga V Dâmbovița.
- Viitorul Voinești withdrew.
- Viitorul Aninoasa (11th place and promotion/relegation play-offs losers) was spared relegation.

Pos	Team	Pld	W	D	L	GF	GA	GD	Pts	Qualification or relegation
1	Recolta Gura Șuții	8	8	0	0	38	10	+28	24	Qualification to promotion play-off
2	Voința Tătărani	8	5	2	1	17	11	+6	17	
3	Olimpia Picior de Munte	8	4	3	1	22	12	+10	15	
4	Viitorul Cojasca	8	4	2	2	29	18	+11	14	
5	Sportul Vlădeni	8	4	1	3	22	13	+9	13	
6	Libertatea Urziceanca	8	4	1	3	15	17	−2	13	
7	Fieni	8	3	3	2	18	13	+5	12	
8	1976 Potlogi	8	3	1	4	18	14	+4	10	
9	Viitorul Aninoasa	8	2	3	3	15	10	+5	9	
10	Malu cu Flori	8	2	3	3	20	22	−2	9	
11	Săgeata Braniștea	8	2	3	3	10	16	−6	9	Qualification to relegation play-out
12	Valahii 1456 Târgoviște	8	2	0	6	14	30	−16	6	Qualification to relegation play-out
13	Găești	8	1	2	5	16	30	−14	5	Relegation to Liga V Dâmbovița
14	Voința Crețu	8	0	0	8	7	45	−38	0	Relegation to Liga V Dâmbovița

Updated to match(es) played on 24 October 2026. Source:
Rules for classification: 1) Points; 2) Head-to-head points; 3) Head-to-head goal difference; 4) Head-to-head goals scored; 5) Head-to-head away goals scored; 6) Goal difference; 7) Goals scored.

Relegation play-out

The 11th and 12th-placed teams of Liga IV will face the 2nd-placed teams of the two series of Liga V Dâmbovița.

Team 1	Score	Team 2
	–	
	–	

=== Dolj County ===
Team changes from the previous season

- FCU 1948 Craiova was relegated from Liga III.
- Viitorul Lăcrița (14th place), Fulgerul Mârșani (15th place) and Progresul Segarcea (16th place) were relegated to Liga V Dolj.
- Unirea Tricolor Dăbuleni (Series II winners) and Viitorul Predești (Series III winners) were promoted from Liga V Dolj.
- ACS Galicea Mare (Series I winners) declined promotion from Liga V Dolj.
- Avântul Pielești, Știința Cerăt and Viitorul Calafat withdrew.
- ACS Afrem și Stoica and Viitorul Segarcea were admitted upon request.

Pos	Team	Pld	W	D	L	GF	GA	GD	Pts	Qualification or relegation
1	Metropolitan Ișalnița	9	8	1	0	33	2	+31	25	Qualification for promotion play-off
2	RFG Melinești	9	7	1	1	43	5	+38	22	
3	Tractorul Cetate	8	7	0	1	26	7	+19	21	
4	Cârcea	9	5	3	1	36	4	+32	18	
5	Știința Celaru	9	5	3	1	22	10	+12	18	
6	Avicola Rojiște	8	6	0	2	22	11	+11	18	
7	Unirea Amărăștii de Jos	8	4	0	4	15	22	−7	12	
8	Știința Danubius Bechet	8	2	3	3	16	16	0	9	
9	Unirea Tricolor Dăbuleni	7	2	1	4	9	24	−15	7	
10	Progresul Băilești	8	2	0	6	11	24	−13	6	
11	Viitorul Segarcea	8	1	2	5	4	34	−30	5	
12	Afrem și Stoica	8	1	1	6	10	25	−15	4	
13	FCU 1948 Craiova	8	1	1	6	10	26	−16	4	
14	Flacăra Moțăței	8	1	1	6	11	38	−27	4	Relegation to Liga V Dolj
15	Viitorul Predești	9	0	3	6	13	33	−20	3	Relegation to Liga V Dolj

Updated to match(es) played on 31 October 2026. Source:
Rules for classification: 1) Points; 2) Head-to-head points; 3) Head-to-head goal difference; 4) Head-to-head goals scored; 5) Head-to-head away goals scored; 6) Goal difference; 7) Goals scored.

=== Galați County ===
Team changes from the previous season

- Agrostar Tulucești (13th place; withdrew) was relegated to Liga V Galați.
- ACS Lascăr Schela (winners) was promoted from Liga V Galați.
- Viitorul Umbrărești withdrew.
- Victoria Tecuci was admitted upon request.
- Sporting Galați was renamed Viitorul Slobozia Conachi.

Pos	Team	Pld	W	D	L	GF	GA	GD	Pts	Qualification or relegation
1	Voința Cudalbi	8	7	1	0	34	7	+27	22	Qualification to promotion play-off
2	Victoria Independența	8	5	0	3	27	20	+7	15	
3	Covurluiul 2021 Târgu Bujor	9	3	5	1	15	9	+6	14	
4	Lascăr Schela	9	4	2	3	27	22	+5	14	
5	Ghidigeni	8	4	2	2	22	18	+4	14	
6	Victoria Tecuci	8	4	2	2	15	17	−2	14	
7	Siretul Cosmești	8	3	2	3	23	22	+1	11	
8	Progresul Munteni	8	3	1	4	22	19	+3	10	
9	Avântul Drăgănești	9	3	1	5	17	27	−10	10	
10	Luceafărul Berești	7	2	2	3	15	14	+1	8	
11	Gloria Ivești	7	2	2	3	16	18	−2	8	
12	Alegria JS Matca	7	1	2	4	16	24	−8	5	
13	Viitorul Slobozia Conachi	8	0	0	8	7	39	−32	0	

Updated to match(es) played on 1 November 2026. Source:
Rules for classification: 1) Points; 2) Head-to-head points; 3) Head-to-head goal difference; 4) Head-to-head goals scored; 5) Head-to-head away goals scored; 6) Goal difference; 7) Goals scored.

=== Giurgiu County ===
The Liga IV Giurgiu County is played in two stages, with a regular season split into two series of twelve teams each, followed by a championship play-off and play-out. The play-off features the top four teams from each series in a double round-robin format, with teams starting from 3, 2, 1, and 0 points based on their final ranking in the regular season. The play-out includes the teams ranked 5th to 12th in each series, also in a double round-robin format, with teams remaining within their respective series and starting with all points accumulated in the regular season. The bottom two teams from each series are relegated to Liga V Giurgiu County.

Team changes from the previous season

- Viitorul Băneasa (South Series 11th place; withdrew), AS Scărișoara (North Series 12th place; withdrew), Silver Inter Zorile (North Series 11th place) and Stejarul Bulbucata (North Series 12th place) were relegated to Liga V Giurgiu.
- Acvila Sport 2003 Giurgiu (South Series winners), Dunărea Greaca (South Series runners-up), CS Buturugeni (North Series winners) and FC Bolintin-Deal (North Series runners-up) were promoted from Liga V Giurgiu.
- MV Călugăreni was renamed Mihai Viteazul Călugăreni.
- FC Bolintin Malu Spart was renamed Academia de Fotbal Bolintin-Vale.

South Series

Pos	Team	Pld	W	D	L	GF	GA	GD	Pts	Qualification or relegation
1	Dunărea Găujani	10	9	0	1	62	8	+54	27	Qualification to championship play-off
2	Mihai Bravu	10	8	0	2	55	17	+38	24	Qualification to championship play-off
3	Victoria Adunații-Copăceni	10	8	0	2	45	17	+28	24	Qualification to championship play-off
4	Giganții Vărăști	10	8	0	2	37	17	+20	24	Qualification to championship play-off
5	Energia Remuș	10	6	0	4	34	24	+10	18	Qualification to championship play-out
6	Academia Slobozia	10	6	0	4	30	30	0	18	Qualification to championship play-out
7	Gloria Comana	10	5	1	4	32	27	+5	16	Qualification to championship play-out
8	Mihai Viteazul Călugăreni	10	4	0	6	21	38	−17	12	Qualification to championship play-out
9	Acvila Sport 2003 Giurgiu	10	2	0	8	14	56	−42	6	Qualification to championship play-out
10	Dunărea Greaca	10	1	2	7	14	43	−29	5	Qualification to championship play-out
11	Viitorul Hulubești	10	1	1	8	10	45	−35	4	Qualification to championship play-out
12	Dunărea Oinacu	10	0	0	10	3	35	−32	−2 (Note: Dunărea Oinacu was deducted 2 points.)	Qualification to championship play-out

Updated to match(es) played on 14 November 2026. Source:
Rules for classification: 1) Points; 2) Head-to-head points; 3) Head-to-head goal difference; 4) Head-to-head goals scored; 5) Head-to-head away goals scored; 6) Goal difference; 7) Goals scored.
Notes:

North Series

Pos	Team	Pld	W	D	L	GF	GA	GD	Pts	Qualification or relegation
1	Academia Bolintin-Vale	10	10	0	0	35	5	+30	30	Qualification to championship play-off
2	Podu Doamnei	10	6	2	2	30	14	+16	20	Qualification to championship play-off
3	Buturugeni	9	6	0	3	20	16	+4	18	Qualification to championship play-off
4	Tântava	9	5	2	2	27	16	+11	17	Qualification to championship play-off
5	Avântul Florești	10	5	1	4	29	22	+7	16	Qualification to championship play-out
6	Petrolul Roata	10	5	1	4	14	19	−5	16	Qualification to championship play-out
7	Luceafărul Trestieni	10	4	2	4	31	28	+3	14	Qualification to championship play-out
8	Bolintin-Deal	10	4	1	5	24	16	+8	13	Qualification to championship play-out
9	Maxima Hobaia	10	3	1	6	25	34	−9	10	Qualification to championship play-out
10	Zmeii Ogrezeni	10	2	1	7	19	42	−23	7	Qualification to championship play-out
11	Speranța Săbăreni	10	1	2	7	14	33	−19	5	Qualification to championship play-out
12	Progresul Palanca	10	1	1	8	10	33	−23	4	Qualification to championship play-out

Updated to match(es) played on 14 November 2026. Source:
Rules for classification: 1) Points; 2) Head-to-head points; 3) Head-to-head goal difference; 4) Head-to-head goals scored; 5) Head-to-head away goals scored; 6) Goal difference; 7) Goals scored.

Championship play-off

Pos	Team	Pld	W	D	L	GF	GA	GD	Pts	Qualification
1	Team1	0	0	0	0	0	0	0	3	Qualification to promotion play-off
2	Team2	0	0	0	0	0	0	0	3	
3	Team3	0	0	0	0	0	0	0	2	
4	Team4	0	0	0	0	0	0	0	2	
5	Team5	0	0	0	0	0	0	0	1	
6	Team6	0	0	0	0	0	0	0	1	
7	Team7	0	0	0	0	0	0	0	0	
8	Team8	0	0	0	0	0	0	0	0	

First match(es) will be played: 2026. Source:
Rules for classification: 1) Points; 2) Head-to-head points; 3) Head-to-head goal difference; 4) Head-to-head goals scored; 5) Head-to-head away goals scored; 6) Goal difference; 7) Goals scored.

Championship play-out
South Series

Pos	Team	Pld	W	D	L	GF	GA	GD	Pts	Relegation
5	Team1	0	0	0	0	0	0	0	0	
6	Team2	0	0	0	0	0	0	0	0	
7	Team3	0	0	0	0	0	0	0	0	
8	Team4	0	0	0	0	0	0	0	0	
9	Team5	0	0	0	0	0	0	0	0	
10	Team6	0	0	0	0	0	0	0	0	
11	Team7	0	0	0	0	0	0	0	0	Relegation to Liga V Giurgiu
12	Team8	0	0	0	0	0	0	0	0	Relegation to Liga V Giurgiu

First match(es) will be played: 2026. Source:
Rules for classification: 1) Points; 2) Head-to-head points; 3) Head-to-head goal difference; 4) Head-to-head goals scored; 5) Head-to-head away goals scored; 6) Goal difference; 7) Goals scored.

North Series

Pos	Team	Pld	W	D	L	GF	GA	GD	Pts	Relegation
5	Team1	0	0	0	0	0	0	0	0	
6	Team2	0	0	0	0	0	0	0	0	
7	Team3	0	0	0	0	0	0	0	0	
8	Team4	0	0	0	0	0	0	0	0	
9	Team5	0	0	0	0	0	0	0	0	
10	Team6	0	0	0	0	0	0	0	0	
11	Team7	0	0	0	0	0	0	0	0	Relegation to Liga V Giurgiu
12	Team8	0	0	0	0	0	0	0	0	Relegation to Liga V Giurgiu

First match(es) will be played: 2026. Source:
Rules for classification: 1) Points; 2) Head-to-head points; 3) Head-to-head goal difference; 4) Head-to-head goals scored; 5) Head-to-head away goals scored; 6) Goal difference; 7) Goals scored.

=== Gorj County ===
The Liga IV Gorj County was played in a double round-robin format, followed by a championship play-off between the top four teams, also played home and away, with all results from the regular season carried over.

Team changes from the previous season

- Gilortul Târgu Cărbunești was relegated from Liga III.
- Viitorul Plopșoru (Series I winners) and Gilortul Bengești (Series II winners) declined promotion from Liga V Gorj.

Pos	Team	Pld	W	D	L	GF	GA	GD	Pts	Qualification or relegation (Note: After 24 matches, the top four teams qualify for the championship play-off.)
1	Negomir	9	8	0	1	36	8	+28	24	Qualification to promotion play-off
2	Turceni	10	7	1	2	28	14	+14	22	
3	Internațional Bălești	10	7	0	3	30	13	+17	21	
4	Minerul Motru	9	6	3	0	20	4	+16	21	
5	Petrolul Țicleni	9	6	1	2	17	9	+8	19	
6	Tismana	9	5	1	3	16	10	+6	16	
7	Petrolul Stoina	9	4	0	5	13	16	−3	12	
8	Parângul Bumbești-Jiu	9	2	2	5	10	15	−5	8	
9	Jiul Rovinari	9	2	2	5	9	18	−9	8	
10	Petrolul Bustuchin	9	2	1	6	11	18	−7	7	
11	Minerul Mătăsari	9	2	1	6	8	24	−16	7	
12	Dinamic Club Jupânești	9	1	1	7	12	31	−19	4	
13	Gilortul Târgu Cărbunești	10	1	1	8	16	46	−30	4	

Updated to match(es) played on 7 November 2026. Source:
Rules for classification: 1) Points; 2) Head-to-head points; 3) Head-to-head goal difference; 4) Head-to-head goals scored; 5) Head-to-head away goals scored; 6) Goal difference; 7) Goals scored.

=== Harghita County ===
The Liga IV Harghita County is contested by nine teams and is played in a three-round format consisting of a home-and-away stage followed by an additional round. After the first two rounds, the teams play a third round based on their ranking at that stage. The last-placed team is relegated.

Team changes from the previous season

- ACS Praid (Odorhei Zone winners) and AS MÜ Frumoasa declined promotion from Liga V Harghita
- Pro Mureșul Toplița and Csikszentmarton Sânmartin withdrew.
- Minerul Bălan was renamed ACS Bălan.

Pos	Team	Pld	W	D	L	GF	GA	GD	Pts	Qualification or relegation
1	Bălan	10	7	2	1	38	19	+19	23	Qualification to promotion play-off
2	Sânsimion	10	7	1	2	28	12	+16	22	
3	Unirea Cristuru Secuiesc	9	6	1	2	20	15	+5	19	
4	Golimpiakosz Odorheiu Secuiesc	10	4	0	6	24	22	+2	12	
5	Bradul Zetea	8	4	0	4	12	11	+1	12	
6	Agyagfalvi Lendület Lutița	9	4	0	5	21	24	−3	12	
7	Făgetul Borsec	8	2	0	6	13	25	−12	6	
8	Metalul Vlăhița	10	1	0	9	11	39	−28	3	
9	Roseal Odorheiu Secuiesc (Note: Roseal Odorheiu Secuiesc withdrew shortly after the start of the season, without playing a single match.)	0	0	0	0	0	0	0	0	Withdrew

Updated to match(es) played on 15 November 2026. Source:
Rules for classification: 1) Points; 2) Head-to-head points; 3) Head-to-head goal difference; 4) Head-to-head goals scored; 5) Head-to-head away goals scored; 6) Goal difference; 7) Goals scored.

=== Ialomița County ===
Team changes from the previous season

- Real Cosâmbești (13th place), Unirea Grivița (14th place) and Ialomița Sudiți (16th place) were relegated to Liga V Ialomița.
- AFC Iazu (Series I winners), Spicul Miloșești (Series II winners) and Victoria Roșiori (Series III winners) were promoted from Liga V Ialomița.

Pos	Team	Pld	W	D	L	GF	GA	GD	Pts	Qualification
1	Bărăganul Ciulnița	11	10	0	1	54	17	+37	30	Qualification to promotion play-off
2	Urziceni	11	9	0	2	36	14	+22	27	
3	Traian	11	8	1	2	60	15	+45	25	
4	Rovine	11	8	1	2	48	19	+29	25	
5	Recolta Bărcănești	11	8	0	3	37	11	+26	24	
6	Iazu	11	7	1	3	48	27	+21	22	
7	Recolta Malu Roșu	11	7	1	3	34	23	+11	22	
8	Înfrățirea Jilavele	11	7	0	4	27	25	+2	21	
9	Fetești	11	6	1	4	27	22	+5	19	
10	Spicul Miloșești	11	4	2	5	24	30	−6	14	
11	Viitorul Făcăeni	11	2	2	7	16	38	−22	8	
12	Abatorul Slobozia	11	2	1	8	27	35	−8	7	
13	Dridu	11	2	1	8	14	62	−48	7	
14	Victoria Țăndărei	11	1	0	10	7	39	−32	3	Relegation to Liga V Ialomița
15	Victoria Munteni-Buzău	11	1	0	10	14	61	−47	3	Relegation to Liga V Ialomița
16	Victoria Roșiori	11	0	1	10	17	52	−35	1	Relegation to Liga V Ialomița

Updated to match(es) played on 7 November 2026. Source:
Rules for classification: 1) Points; 2) Head-to-head points; 3) Head-to-head goal difference; 4) Head-to-head goals scored; 5) Head-to-head away goals scored; 6) Goal difference; 7) Goals scored.

=== Iași County ===
Team changes from the previous season

- CSM Pașcani achieved promotion to Liga III.
- Știința Miroslava was administratively relegated from Liga III.
- Moldova Cristești (8th place; withdrew), Com-Val Valea Lupului (12th place; withdrew) and Unirea Scânteia (14th place; withdrew) were relegated to Liga V Iași.
- Academia 82 Iași (Series I winners) was promoted from Liga V Iași.
- Unirea Alexandru Ioan Cuza (Series II winners) declined promotion from Liga V Iași.
- USV Iași II and ASPI Iași were admitted upon request.

Pos	Team	Pld	W	D	L	GF	GA	GD	Pts	Qualification or relegation
1	ASPI Iași	12	10	1	1	55	6	+49	31	Qualification to promotion play-off
2	Tonmir Iași	12	10	1	1	54	13	+41	31	
3	Știința Miroslava	12	10	0	2	69	9	+60	30	
4	Victoria Lețcani	12	9	1	2	39	14	+25	28	
5	USV Iași II	12	9	0	3	41	11	+30	27	
6	Stejarul Bârnova	12	7	1	4	40	39	+1	22	
7	Țuțora	12	7	0	5	26	23	+3	21	
8	Gloria Bălțați	12	5	0	7	25	40	−15	15	
9	Unirea Ruginoasa	12	3	2	7	21	35	−14	11	
10	Academia 82 Iași	12	3	1	8	26	41	−15	10	
11	Viitorul Belcești	12	2	1	9	11	52	−41	7	
12	Tomești	12	1	2	9	24	56	−32	5	
13	Viitorul Hârlau	12	1	1	10	12	48	−36	4	Relegation to Liga V Iași
14	Progresul Deleni	12	1	1	10	5	61	−56	4	Relegation to Liga V Iași

Updated to match(es) played on 8 November 2026. Source:
Rules for classification: 1) Points; 2) Head-to-head points; 3) Head-to-head goal difference; 4) Head-to-head goals scored; 5) Head-to-head away goals scored; 6) Goal difference; 7) Goals scored.

=== Prahova County ===
Team changes from the previous season

- Progresul Drăgănești achieved promotion to Liga III.
- CS Brazi (15th place) and CS Bucov (16th place) were relegated to Liga V Prahova.
- Viitorul Ceptura (East Series winners), Muscelul Câmpina (West Series winners) and Unirea Urlați (East Series runners-up and promotion play-off winners (Note: Unirea Urlați defeated Caraimanul Bușteni 4–2, the runner-up of West Series, in the promotion play-off.)) were promoted from Liga V Prahova.
- CSL Vărbilău was renamed Voința Vărbilău.
- Petrosport Ploiești was renamed Petrosport Strejnicu.

Pos	Team	Pld	W	D	L	GF	GA	GD	Pts	Qualification or relegation
1	Cornu	11	10	0	1	43	10	+33	30	Qualification to promotion play-off
2	Câmpina	11	9	1	1	36	12	+24	28	
3	Aricești Nedelea	11	7	2	2	33	22	+11	23	
4	Unirea Urlați	11	7	2	2	23	13	+10	23	
5	Boldești-Scăeni	11	7	1	3	35	15	+20	22	
6	Avântul Măneciu	11	7	0	4	22	21	+1	21	
7	Brebu	11	5	2	4	30	22	+8	17	
8	Comarnic	11	5	2	4	20	15	+5	17	
9	Gherghița	12	5	0	7	19	29	−10	15	
10	Voința Vărbilău	11	4	2	5	17	19	−2	14	
11	Tineretul Gura Vitioarei	11	3	2	6	21	32	−11	11	
12	Muscelul Câmpina	11	3	2	6	14	27	−13	11	
13	Viitorul Ceptura	11	3	1	7	27	30	−3	10	
14	Petrosport Strejnicu	11	1	3	7	11	27	−16	6	
15	Mănești	12	2	0	10	18	35	−17	6	Relegation to Liga V Prahova
16	Valea Călugărească	11	0	2	9	14	54	−40	2	Relegation to Liga V Prahova

Updated to match(es) played on 8 November 2026. Source:
Rules for classification: 1) Points; 2) Head-to-head points; 3) Head-to-head goal difference; 4) Head-to-head goals scored; 5) Head-to-head away goals scored; 6) Goal difference; 7) Goals scored.

=== Teleorman County ===
Team changes from the previous season

- Viitorul Săceni (winners) was promoted from Liga V Teleorman.
- Tineretul Siliștea (runners-up) declined promotion from Liga V Teleorman.
- CSC Putineiu and Young Steaua Alexandria withdrew.
- Avântul Bragadiru and CSM Alexandria II were spared relegation.
- Steaua Roșie Bujoru was admitted upon request.

Pos	Team	Pld	W	D	L	GF	GA	GD	Pts	Qualification or relegation
1	Drăgănești-Vlașca	11	10	1	0	37	8	+29	31	Qualification to promotion play-off
2	Astra Plosca	11	7	1	3	52	16	+36	22	
3	Seaca	11	6	3	2	25	11	+14	21	
4	Viitorul Lunca	11	6	2	3	35	24	+11	20	
5	Viitorul Săceni	11	6	2	3	27	23	+4	20	
6	Steaua Spătărei	11	6	1	4	33	21	+12	19	
7	Metalul Peretu	11	5	3	3	27	16	+11	18	
8	Voința Saelele 2017	11	5	2	4	31	17	+14	17	
9	Dinamic Kids Videle	11	5	2	4	29	16	+13	17	
10	Avântul Bragadiru	11	4	0	7	19	21	−2	12	
11	Rapid Buzescu	11	3	2	6	19	25	−6	11	
12	Tineretul Suhaia	11	2	5	4	19	34	−15	11	
13	Atletic Orbeasca	11	3	2	6	20	37	−17	11	
14	Steaua Roșie Bujoru	11	2	1	8	12	42	−30	7	
15	Tineretul Ciolănești	11	2	1	8	25	69	−44	7	Relegation to Liga V Teleorman
16	Alexandria II	11	2	0	9	16	46	−30	6	Relegation to Liga V Teleorman

Updated to match(es) played on 7 November 2026. Source:
Rules for classification: 1) Points; 2) Head-to-head points; 3) Head-to-head goal difference; 4) Head-to-head goals scored; 5) Head-to-head away goals scored; 6) Goal difference; 7) Goals scored.

=== Timiș County ===
Team changes from the previous season

- AS Berini (16th place) was relegated to Liga V Timiș.
- CS Giroc-Chișoda (Series III winners) was promoted from Liga V Timiș.
- Unirea Tomnatic (Series I winners) and Progresul Ciacova (Series II winners) declined promotion from Liga V Timiș.

Pos	Team	Pld	W	D	L	GF	GA	GD	Pts	Qualification or relegation
1	Lugoj	12	11	0	1	36	9	+27	33	Qualification to promotion play-off
2	Săcălaz	12	10	1	1	43	12	+31	31	
3	Unirea Sânnicolau Mare	12	9	1	2	39	13	+26	28	
4	Sânandrei Carani	12	9	1	2	36	19	+17	28	
5	Giroc-Chișoda	12	8	1	3	31	17	+14	25	
6	Ripensia Timișoara	12	6	3	3	18	11	+7	21	
7	Millenium Giarmata	12	6	2	4	29	19	+10	20	
8	Belinț	12	6	2	4	22	20	+2	20	
9	Gloria Moșnița Nouă	12	4	2	6	17	19	−2	14	
10	Flacăra Parța	12	4	2	6	20	33	−13	14	
11	Avântul Periam	12	3	2	7	13	17	−4	11	
12	UVT Timișoara	12	3	1	8	22	34	−12	10	
13	Recaș	12	2	1	9	18	48	−30	7	
14	Ghiroda II	12	1	3	8	13	31	−18	6	
15	Unirea Jimbolia	12	2	0	10	19	48	−29	6	
16	Deta	12	1	0	11	11	37	−26	3	Relegation to Liga V Timiș

Updated to match(es) played on 7 November 2026. Source:
Rules for classification: 1) Points; 2) Head-to-head points; 3) Head-to-head goal difference; 4) Head-to-head goals scored; 5) Head-to-head away goals scored; 6) Goal difference; 7) Goals scored.

=== Vaslui County ===
The Liga IV Vaslui County is played over two stages. The regular season consists of a single round-robin tournament featuring twelve teams. The top six teams qualify for the championship play-off, while the bottom six advance to the play-out. Both the play-off and play-out are contested in a double round-robin format, with all points accumulated during the regular season carried over.

Team changes from the previous season

- CSO Negrești (9th place and promotion/relegation play-offs losers) and FC 2007 Gârceni (12th place) were relegated to Liga V Vaslui.
- Ivacec Vaslui (winners), Phoenix Team Tanacu (runners-up) and Recolta Laza (3rd place and promotion/relegation play-offs winners) were promoted from Liga V Vaslui.
- Comstar Vaslui withdrew.
- Vitis Șuletea was spared relegation.

Pos	Team	Pld	W	D	L	GF	GA	GD	Pts	Qualification
1	Hușana Huși	9	9	0	0	57	8	+49	27	Qualification to championship play-off
2	Unirea Dodești	9	6	1	2	29	17	+12	19	Qualification to championship play-off
3	Phoenix Team Tanacu	8	5	1	2	34	18	+16	16	Qualification to championship play-off
4	Viitorul Văleni	9	5	1	3	31	22	+9	16	Qualification to championship play-off
5	Flacăra Muntenii de Sus	9	5	1	3	21	13	+8	16	Qualification to championship play-off
6	Vulturești	9	5	1	3	30	31	−1	16	Qualification to championship play-off
7	Ivacec Vaslui	8	4	3	1	17	12	+5	15	Qualification to championship play-out
8	Recolta Laza	9	4	0	5	15	12	+3	12	Qualification to championship play-out
9	Ghergheleu	9	2	1	6	21	36	−15	7	Qualification to championship play-out
10	Vitis Șuletea	9	2	0	7	10	35	−25	6	Qualification to championship play-out
11	Star Tătărăni	9	1	1	7	12	34	−22	4	Qualification to championship play-out
12	Voința Perieni	9	0	0	9	5	44	−39	0	Qualification to championship play-out

Updated to match(es) played on 8 November 2026. Source:
Rules for classification: 1) Points; 2) Head-to-head points; 3) Head-to-head goal difference; 4) Head-to-head goals scored; 5) Head-to-head away goals scored; 6) Goal difference; 7) Goals scored.

Championship play-off

Pos	Team	Pld	W	D	L	GF	GA	GD	Pts	Qualification
1	Team1	0	0	0	0	0	0	0	0	Qualification for promotion play-off
2	Team2	0	0	0	0	0	0	0	0	
3	Team3	0	0	0	0	0	0	0	0	
4	Team4	0	0	0	0	0	0	0	0	
5	Team5	0	0	0	0	0	0	0	0	
6	Team6	0	0	0	0	0	0	0	0	

First match(es) will be played: 2026. Source:
Rules for classification: 1) Points; 2) Head-to-head points; 3) Head-to-head goal difference; 4) Head-to-head goals scored; 5) Head-to-head away goals scored; 6) Goal difference; 7) Goals scored.

Championship play-out

Pos	Team	Pld	W	D	L	GF	GA	GD	Pts	Qualification or relegation
7	Team1	0	0	0	0	0	0	0	0	
8	Team2	0	0	0	0	0	0	0	0	
9	Team3	0	0	0	0	0	0	0	0	Qualification to relegation play-out
10	Team4	0	0	0	0	0	0	0	0	Qualification to relegation play-out
11	Team5	0	0	0	0	0	0	0	0	Relegation to Liga V Vaslui
12	Team6	0	0	0	0	0	0	0	0	Relegation to Liga V Vaslui

First match(es) will be played: 2026. Source:
Rules for classification: 1) Points; 2) Head-to-head points; 3) Head-to-head goal difference; 4) Head-to-head goals scored; 5) Head-to-head away goals scored; 6) Goal difference; 7) Goals scored.

Relegation play-out

The 9th- and 10th-placed teams of Liga IV will face the 3rd- and 4th-placed teams of the Liga V Vaslui County.

Team 1	Agg.	Team 2	1st leg	2nd leg
	–		–	–
	–		–	–

=== Vâlcea County ===
Team changes from the previous season

- Atletic Drăgășani (16th place) was relegated to Liga V Vâlcea.
- Topologul Galicea (winners) and ACS Olanu (runners-up) were promoted from Liga V Vâlcea.
- Viitorul Șirineasa withdrew.
- Foresta Malaia (15th place) was spared relegation.
- CSC Orlești was renamed Voința Orlești.

Pos	Team	Pld	W	D	L	GF	GA	GD	Pts	Qualification or relegation
1	Viitorul Budești	11	11	0	0	57	7	+50	33	Qualification for promotion play-off
2	Oltețul Alunu	11	9	2	0	48	6	+42	29	
3	Păușești-Măglași	11	9	1	1	56	16	+40	28	
4	Cozia Călimănești	11	9	0	2	59	11	+48	27	
5	Băbeni	11	8	0	3	32	11	+21	24	
6	Olanu	11	7	0	4	43	19	+24	21	
7	Minerul Costești	11	6	0	5	19	29	−10	18	
8	Viitorul Horezu	11	5	2	4	30	15	+15	17	
9	Lotru Brezoi	11	5	1	5	20	24	−4	16	
10	Unirea Tomșani	11	5	1	5	30	37	−7	16	
11	Voința Orlești	11	3	1	7	21	54	−33	10	
12	Topologul Galicea	11	2	1	8	17	43	−26	7	
13	Sporting Drăgășani	11	1	2	8	16	45	−29	5	
14	Foresta Malaia	11	1	1	9	8	51	−43	4	
15	Viitorul Mateești	11	1	0	10	8	41	−33	3	Relegation to Liga V Vâlcea
16	Gușoeni	11	0	0	11	16	71	−55	0	Relegation to Liga V Vâlcea

Updated to match(es) played on 7 November 2026. Source:
Rules for classification: 1) Points; 2) Head-to-head points; 3) Head-to-head goal difference; 4) Head-to-head goals scored; 5) Head-to-head away goals scored; 6) Goal difference; 7) Goals scored.

== See also ==
- 2026–27 Liga I
- 2026–27 Liga II
- 2026–27 Liga III
- 2026–27 Cupa României
