= CSL Hidro Mecanica Șugag 1984 =

Hidro Mecanica Șugag
- Full name: Clubul Sportiv Local Hidro Mecanica Șugag 1984
- Nicknames: Șugăgenii (The people from Șugag)
- Short name: Șugag
- Founded: 1984
- Dissolved: 2026
- Ground: Hidro Mecanica
- Capacity: 4,500
- Owner: Șugag Commune

Clubul Sportiv Local Hidro Mecanica Șugag 1984, commonly known as Hidro Mecanica Șugag or simply Șugag, was a Romanian football club based in Șugag, Alba County, which last competed in Liga III, the third tier of Romanian football.

== History ==
Hidro Mecanica Șugag was founded in 1984 and spent most of its existence competing in the lower tiers of Alba County football. For many years, the team played in the fifth division, the second level of county football, where it achieved several solid results in its series between 2009 and 2016. Șugag finished 4th in the 2009–10 season, 6th in 2010–11, 3rd in 2011–12, 4th in both 2012–13 and 2013–14, and then 2nd in the 2014–15 and 2015–16 seasons, also reaching the final of the Cupa României – County Phase, where it lost 0–1 to Viitorul Sântimbru. The club earned promotion to Liga IV – Alba County, where it took the name Transalpina Șugag, after national road that crosses the commune from south to north, as it lies at the southwestern edge of the Transylvanian Plateau.

The debut in the higher division was encouraging, as Transalpina ended the 2016–17 campaign in 4th place under Radu Andone, and improved to 3rd in 2017–18, with Ionel Marcu in charge for the first half of the season before Andone returned after a short spell at Unirea Alba Iulia. That year, the club once again reached the final of the Cupa României – County Phase, losing 2–3 to Sportul Petrești. However, after that season, the club withdrew from the competition and rejoined the fifth tier under the name Hidro Mecanica Șugag 1984, finishing as runners-up in both the 2018–19 and 2019–20 seasons.

After the COVID-19 pandemic disrupted local football, the team reappeared in Liga IV, being admitted to fill vacant places in the competition. The following seasons were used to rebuild the squad, with the club finishing 12th in 2021–22, 13th in 2022–23, spared from relegation as the league was expanded from fourteen to sixteen teams, and improving to 7th in 2023–24.

The club’s most successful campaign came in 2024–25, when, under the guidance of Ionel Marcu, Hidro Mecanica Șugag dominated the Liga IV – Alba County season and secured promotion to Liga III, marking its first national-level participation in history. The promotion was confirmed without the need to play the scheduled play-off match against Stăruința Zagon, the Covasna County champions, who did not receive the right to participate from the Romanian Football Federation.

After the promotion, Hidro Mecanica Șugag was placed in Series VII of the 2025–26 Liga III season, with Ioan Neag appointed as the new head coach.

== Honours ==
Liga IV – Alba County

- Winners (1): 2024–25

Liga V – Alba County

- Runners-up (4): 2014–15, 2015–16, 2018–19, 2019–20

Cupa României – Alba County

- Runners-up (2): 2015–16, 2017–18
