= ACS Oltul Curtișoara =

Romanian football club

Oltul Curtișoara
- Full name: Asociația Club Sportiv; Oltul Curtișoara
- Nicknames: Curtișorenii (The people from Curtișoara)
- Short name: Oltul
- Founded: 2013; 13 years ago
- Ground: Tineretului
- Capacity: 500
- Owner: Curtișoara Commune
- Chairman: Adrian Brânză
- Head coach: Dan Ignat
- League: Liga III
- 2025–26: Liga III, Seria V, 5th
Home colours	Away colours

Asociația Club Sportiv Oltul Curtișoara, also known as Oltul Curtișoara, or just Oltul is a Romanian football club based in Curtișoara, Olt County, which currently plays in Liga III, the third tier of Romanian football.

== History ==
Oltul Curtișoara was founded in 2013 and was enrolled in Liga IV – Olt County, the fourth tier of Romanian football league system.

In the 2015–16 season finished in last place with only 6 points, as in the next season they finished 8th place, as in the following season the club finished 3rd place.

In the 2018–19 season, Oltul finished in 2nd place with 80 points, 22 points behind CSM Slatina, as well in the next season, when the league was suspended because of the COVID-19, as the club finished 2nd place, behind Petrolul Potcoava.

In the 2021–22 Liga IV the club won the league, but lost the promotion play-offs against Cozia Călimănești, Vâlcea County champions on penalties 4–2, as in the next season under the command of Dan Ignat the club won again the league, but lost to ARO Muscelul Câmpulung 6–2 on aggregate, 2–0 in the first leg and 4–2 in the second leg.

However, the club was enrolled in 2023–24 Liga III season, following the withdrawal of several clubs, and finished 8th place.

== Honours ==
Liga IV – Olt County

- Winners (2): 2021–22, 2022–23
- Runners-up (2): 2018–19, 2019–20

== Players ==
=== First team squad ===
As of 10 September 2024

Note: Flags indicate national team as defined under FIFA eligibility rules; some limited exceptions apply. Players may hold more than one non-FIFA nationality.

No.	Pos.	Nation	Player
1	GK	ROU	Marius Stănciulescu
2	DF	ROU	George Ștefan
3	DF	ROU	Dorinel Ungureanu
5	MF	ROU	Manuel Enache
6	FW	ROU	Mihai Vărzaru
7	DF	ROU	Mario Ene (on loan from CSU Craiova)
8	MF	ROU	Cristian Tudor
9	MF	ROU	Andrei Cîrciumaru
10	FW	ROU	Marius Jianu (Captain)
11	MF	ROU	Radu Necșulescu
13	DF	ROU	Beniamin Enache

No.	Pos.	Nation	Player
14	DF	ROU	Robert Băjan (Vice-Captain)
15	DF	ROU	Alexandru Dinu
16	MF	ROU	Florin Covercă
17	MF	ROU	Mihai Stavarache
18	MF	ROU	Rareș Vozaru
19	DF	ROU	Mario Balaci
21	FW	ROU	Liviu Bărbulescu
22	DF	ROU	Marian Cristea
25	MF	ROU	Mihnea Neicu
29	MF	ROU	Claudiu Negoescu
55	GK	ROU	Victor Turianu

=== Out on loan ===
Note: Flags indicate national team as defined under FIFA eligibility rules; some limited exceptions apply. Players may hold more than one non-FIFA nationality.

No. / Pos. / Nation / Player	No. / Pos. / Nation / Player

== Club officials ==
=== Board of directors ===
Role	Name
Owner	(Romania) Curtișoara Commune
President	(Romania) Adrian Brânză
Sporting director	(Romania) Antonel Negoescu

=== Current technical staff ===
Role	Name
Technical director	(Romania) Ionuț Tache
Head coach	(Romania) Dan Ignat

== League history ==
Season	Tier	Division	Place	Notes	Cupa României
2025–26	3	Liga III (Seria V)	TBD		
2024–25	3	Liga III (Seria IV)	5th		
2023–24	3	Liga III (Seria VI)	8th		

Season	Tier	Division	Place	Notes	Cupa României
2022–23	4	Liga IV (OT)	1st (C)	Promoted	
2021–22	4	Liga IV (OT)	1st (C)		
