= 2009–10 FC Steaua București season =

Steaua București
2009–10 season
- Owner: George Becali
- President: Valeriu Argăseală
- Head coach: Cristiano Bergodi; Mihai Stoichiță
- Stadium: Stadionul Steaua
- Liga I: 4th
- Cupa României: Round of 16
- Europa League: Group stage
- Top goalscorer: League: Pantelis Kapetanos (15); All: Pantelis Kapetanos (19)
- Highest home attendance: 21,446 vs Motherwell (30 July 2009)
- Lowest home attendance: 800 (approx.) vs Twente (18 December 2009)
Home colours	Away colours	Third colours

The 2009–10 season was the 62nd season in the existence of FC Steaua București and the club's 62nd consecutive season in the top flight of Romanian football. In addition to the domestic league, Steaua București participated in this season's edition of the Cupa României and the UEFA Europa League.

== Previous season positions ==
	Competition	Position
(European Union)	UEFA Champions League	4th / Group stage
(Romania)	Liga I	6th
(Romania)	Cupa României	Round of 32

== Players ==
=== Squad information ===
N	Pos.	Nat.	Name	Age	EU	Since	App	Goals	Ends	Transfer fee	Notes
1	GK	(Colombia)	Rufay	31	Non-EU	2007	66	0	2011	€0.5M	
2	CB	(Cyprus)	Parpas	24	EU	2010	0	0	2010	Undisclosed	
3	LB	(Nigeria)	Emeghara	26	Non-EU	2007	12	0	2011	€1.2M	Also plays as RB
4	RB	(Poland)	Golański	27	EU	2007	37	1	2010	€1M	
5	CB	(Bulgaria)	Zhelev	30	EU	2010	0	0	2011	Ochiroșii	
7	RW	(Romania)	Székely	27	EU	2008	16	1	2013	€1.5M	Also plays as LW
8	DM	(Romania)	Ov. Petre	28	EU	2006	56	4	2011	€1M	
9	FW	(Greece)	Kapetanos	26	EU	2008	23	11	Undisclosed	Free	
10	AM	(Romania)	Tănase	23	EU	2009	0	0	2014	€1.8M	Also plays as LW, RW and CM; 50% of next sale will go to Argeș Pitești
11	FW	(Armenia)	A. Karamyan	30	Non-EU	2010	0	0	2010	Free	
12	GK	(Romania)	Tătărușanu	24	EU	2008	0	0	2013	€1.5M	
14	AM	(Colombia)	Toja	25	Non-EU	2008	23	2	2011	€0.58M	
15	CB	(Romania)	Tudose	23	EU	2005	2	0	2011	Undisclosed	
16	RW	(Romania)	Nicoliță	25	EU	2005	128	17	2010	Undisclosed	Also plays as LW and RB
17	CB	(Romania)	Baciu	29	EU	2004	70	1	2011	€0.23M	FCM Bacău should receive €0.4M if Baciu is transferred or becomes free player
18	LB	(Romania)	P. Marin (C)	36	EU	2004	107	1	2010	€0.04M	Also plays as RB
19	CM	(Romania)	Pleșan	27	EU	2007	22	2	2012	€1.3M	
20	CB	(Senegal)	Tall	25	Non-EU	2010	0	0	2010	Undisclosed	
22	FW	(Colombia)	Pepe	28	Non-EU	2010	15	5	2010	Undisclosed	
24	FW	(Romania)	Surdu	26	EU	2007	12	0	2011	Undisclosed	Also plays as LW
26	CM	(Romania)	Eric	22	EU	2007	15	1	2012	Undisclosed	
28	FW	(Romania)	Stancu	22	EU	2008	29	11	2012	€1M	Also plays as SS; 50% of next sale will go to Giovani Becali
77	LW	(Armenia)	Karamyan	30	Non-EU	2010	0	0	2010	Free	
Players from Steaua II
21	AM	(Romania)	Fl. Matei	17	EU	2010	0	0	Undisclosed	Youth system	
27	DM	(Romania)	Iacob	21	EU	2009	0	0	2012	Youth system	Also plays as CB
32	LB	(Romania)	Filip	19	EU	2009	0	0	Undisclosed	Youth system	
Players sold or loaned out during the season
3	CB	(Romania)	Goian (VC)	30	EU	2005	104	6	2010	€0.1M + €1M	
5	CB	(Romania)	Rada	27	EU	2007	21	1	2010	Undisclosed	Also plays as LB
10	LW	(Poland)	Grzelak	27	EU	2009	0	0	2010	Undisclosed	
19	AM	(Romania)	A. Ionescu	22	EU	2008	8	0	2013	€0.5M	50% of next sale will go to FC U Craiova
20	LB	(Portugal) (Mozambique)	Tininho	29	EU	2009	0	0	2010	Free	
21	LW	(Romania)	Ochiroșii	21	EU	2005	22	2	2012	Youth system	
23	AM	(Colombia)	Dayro M.	24	Non-EU	2008	38	10	2012	€1.4M	Also plays as FW; 20% of his next transfer fee will be owned to Once Caldas
24	CB	(Romania)	Ghionea (captain)	31	EU	2002	117	2	Undisclosed	Free	
25	DM	(Romania)	Onicaș	20	EU	2009	1	0	Undisclosed	Youth system	
31	CB	(Romania)	Ninu	23	EU	2007	0	0	2010	€0.4M	Also plays as RB and LB
33	GK	(Romania)	Cezar	22	EU	2009	0	0	2010	Youth system	
99	FW	(Bulgaria)	Bibishkov	27	EU	2009	0	0	2012	Free	

- Last updated: 12:00, 18 May 2010 (UTC)
- Source: Steaua News

=== Transfers ===
==== In ====
No.	Pos.	Nat.	Name	Age	EU	Moving from	Type	Transfer window	Ends	Transfer fee	Source
12	GK	(Romania)	Tătărușanu	23	EU	Gloria Bistrița	Loan return	Summer	2013	—	
82	GK	(Romania)	Vâtcă	27	EU	Gaz Metan Mediaș	Loan return	Summer	Undisclosed	—	
31	RB	(Romania)	Ninu	22	EU	Gloria Bistrița	Loan return	Summer	Undisclosed	—	
5	CB	(Romania)	Rada	26	EU	Otopeni	Loan return	Summer	2010	—	
11	FW	(Romania)	Surdu	25	EU	Brașov	Loan return	Summer	2011	—	
—	FW	(Romania)	Simion	23	EU	Pandurii Târgu Jiu	Loan return	Summer	Undisclosed	—	
2	RB	(Romania)	Bălan	29	EU	Alki Larnaca (Cyprus)	Loan return	Summer	2010	—	
10	LW	(Poland)	Grzelak	27	EU	Skoda Xanthi (Greece)	Loan	Summer	2010	Undisclosed	FCSB
99	FW	(Bulgaria)	Bibishkov	26	EU	Litex Lovech (Bulgaria)	Free transfer	Summer	2012	Free	FCSB
20	LB	(Portugal) (Mozambique)	Tininho	28	EU	Belenenses (Portugal)	Free transfer	Summer	2010	Free	FCSB
27	DM	(Romania)	Iacob	20	EU	Steaua II București	Promoted	Summer	Undisclosed	—	
6	AM	(Romania)	Tănase	22	EU	Argeș Pitești	Transfer	Summer	2014	€1.8M	FCSB
23	AM	(Colombia)	Dayro M.	24	Non-EU	Steaua II București	Promoted	Summer	2012	—	
22	CM	(Romania)	Pleșan	26	EU	Steaua II București	Promoted	Summer	2012	—	
—	RB	(Romania)	Bălan	30	EU	Aris Limassol (Cyprus)	Loan return	Winter	2010	—	
5	CB	(Bulgaria)	Zhelev	30	EU	Oțelul Galați	Swap	Winter	2011	Ochiroșii	FCSB
11	FW	(Armenia)	A. Karamyan	30	Non-EU	Politehnica Timișoara	Free transfer	Winter	2010	Free	FCSB
77	LW	(Armenia)	Karamyan	30	Non-EU	Politehnica Timișoara	Free transfer	Winter	2010	Free	FCSB
2	CB	(Cyprus)	Parpas	24	EU	AEL Limassol	Loan	Winter	2010	Undisclosed	FCSB
22	FW	(Colombia)	Pepe	28	EU	Independiente (Argentina)	Loan	Winter	2010	Undisclosed	FCSB
20	CB	(Senegal)	Tall	24	Non-EU	APOP Kinyras (Cyprus)	Loan	Winter	2010	Undisclosed	FCSB

==== Out ====
No.	Pos.	Nat.	Name	Age	EU	Moving to	Type	Transfer window	Transfer fee	Source
2	RB	(Romania)	Ogăraru	29	EU	Ajax (Netherlands)	End of loan	Summer	—	
30	DM	(Portugal)	Tiago Gomes	23	EU	Estrela da Amadora (Portugal)	End of loan	Summer	—	
—	FW	(Romania)	Simion	22	EU	Steaua II București	Second team	Summer	—	
12	GK	(Romania)	Cernea	33	EU	Unirea Alba Iulia	Mutual termination	Summer	Free	FCSB
11	FW	(Romania)	Lițu	22	EU	Steaua II București	Second team	Summer	—	
20	DM	(Romania)	Lovin	27	EU	Steaua II București	Second team	Summer	—	GSP
23	CM	(Romania)	Pleșan	26	EU	Steaua II București	Second team	Summer	—	GSP
9	FW	(Portugal)	Semedo	30	EU	Steaua II București	Second team	Summer	—	GSP
10	AM	(Colombia)	Dayro M.	23	Non-EU	Steaua II București	Second team	Summer	—	GSP
22	FW	(Bolivia)	Pedriel	22	Non-EU	Steaua II București	Second team	Summer	—	GSP
27	LB	(Romania)	Filip	18	EU	Steaua II București	Second team	Summer	—	
29	FW	(Romania)	Rusu	19	EU	Steaua II București	Second team	Summer	—	
82	GK	(Romania)	Vâtcă	27	EU	Gaz Metan Mediaș	Loaned out	Summer	Undisclosed	
2	RB	(Romania)	Bălan	30	EU	Aris Limassol (Cyprus)	Loaned out	Summer	Undisclosed	FCSB
3	CB	(Romania)	Goian	28	EU	Palermo (Italy)	Transfer	Summer	€2M	FCSB
20	LB	(Portugal) (Mozambique)	Tininho	28	EU	Leixões (Portugal)	Contract termination	Summer	Free	FCSB
5	CB	(Romania)	Rada	27	EU	Al NJasr (United Arab Emirates)	Transfer	Winter	€0.27M	FCSB
21	LW	(Romania)	Ochiroșii	20	EU	Oțelul Galați	Swap	Winter	Zhelev +50%	FCSB
—	RB	(Romania)	Bălan	30	EU	SKA-Energiya Khabarovsk (Russia)	Loaned out	Winter	Undisclosed	
24	CB	(Romania)	Ghionea	30	EU	Rostov (Russia)	Transfer	Winter	€0.1M	FCSB
27	DM	(Romania)	Iacob	20	EU	Steaua II București	Second team	Winter	—	
10	LW	(Poland)	Grzelak	27	EU	Steaua II București	Second team	Winter	—	
99	FW	(Bulgaria)	Bibishkov	27	EU	Steaua II București	Second team	Winter	—	
25	DM	(Romania)	Onicaș	20	EU	Politehnica Iași	Loaned out	Winter	Undisclosed	FCSB
31	CB	(Romania)	Ninu	23	EU	Farul Constanța	Loaned out	Winter	Undisclosed	FCSB
19	AM	(Romania)	Ionescu	21	EU	Politehnica Iași	Loaned out	Winter	Undisclosed	FCSB
23	AM	(Colombia)	Dayro M.	24	Non-EU	Once Caldas (Colombia)	Transfer	Winter	Undisclosed	
33	GK	(Romania)	Cezar	21	EU	Steaua II București	Second team	Winter	—	

==== Spending ====
Summer: ▼€1.8 million

Winter: ▼€0 million

Total: ▼€1.8 million

==== Income ====
Summer: ▲€2 million

Winter: ▲€0.37 million

Total: ▲€2.37 million

== Statistics ==
=== Player stats ===
				Total				UEFA Europa League		Liga I		Cupa României		
N	Pos.	Name	Nat.	GS	App	Gls	Min	App	Gls	App	Gls	App	Gls	Notes
1	GK	Rufay	(Colombia)	28	28	-28	—	8	-8	19	-20	1		
2	CB	Parpas	(Cyprus)	12	13		—			13				
3	LB	Emeghara	(Nigeria)	10	12		—	1		11				GS: 7 RB, 3 LB
4	RB	Golański	(Poland)	26	28	1	—	7		21	1			GS: 24 RB, 1 CB, 1 DM
5	CB	Zhelev	(Bulgaria)	16	16	1	—			16	1			
7	RW	Székely	(Romania)	31	33	6	—	10	1	21	5	2		GS: 24 RW, 5 LW, 2 CM
8	DM	Ov. Petre	(Romania)	18	19	1	—			18	1	1		GS: 17 DM, 1 CB
9	FW	Kapetanos	(Greece)	32	41	19	—	10	2	30	15	1	2	
10	AM	Tănase	(Romania)	16	26	1	—	4		21	1	1		GS: 5 AM, 4 RW, 4 FW, 3 LW
11	FW	A. Karamyan	(Armenia)	8	13	5	—			13	5			GS: 8 LW
12	GK	Tătărușanu	(Romania)	20	20	-17	—	4	-1	15	-16	1		
14	AM	Toja	(Colombia)	27	36	2	—	8	1	28	1			GS: 25 AM, 2 LW
15	CB	Tudose	(Romania)	8	12		—	3		8		1		
16	RW	Nicoliță	(Romania)	39	40	5	—	11	3	28	2	1		GS: 20 LW, 18 RW, 1 RB
17	CB	Baciu	(Romania)	22	26		—	7		17		2		GS: 20 CB, 1 RB, 1 cm
18	LB	P. Marin	(Romania)	36	38	2	—	8	1	29	1	1		GS: 32 LB, 4 RB
19	CM	Pleșan	(Romania)	13	19	1	—			18	1	1		
20	CB	Tall	(Senegal)				—							
22	FW	Pepe	(Colombia)		6		—			6				
24	FW	Surdu	(Romania)	26	43	6	—	10	1	32	5	1		
26	CM	Eric	(Romania)	11	15		—	6		7		2		
28	FW	Stancu	(Romania)	32	35	14	—	9	6	25	8	1		
77	LW	Karamyan	(Armenia)	4	8		—			8				GS: 3 LB, 1 LW
Players from Steaua II
21	AM	Fl. Matei	(Romania)		2		—			2				
27	DM	Iacob	(Romania)	1	3		—	1		2				
32	LB	Filip	(Romania)	1	2		—			2				
Players sold or loaned out during the season
3	CB	Goian	(Romania)	4	4		—	3		1				
5	CB	Rada	(Romania)	19	19		—	6		11		2		GS: 14 CB, 5 LB
10	LW	Grzelak	(Poland)	4	13	1	—	6	1	6		1		
19	AM	A. Ionescu	(Romania)	12	18		—	9		8		1		
20	LB	Tininho	(Portugal) (Mozambique)		1		—	1						
21	LW	Ochiroșii	(Romania)	3	13	1	—	6	1	5		2		
23	AM	Dayro M.	(Colombia)	4	9	2	—	3		5	2	1		GS: 4 FW
24	CB	Ghionea	(Romania)	22	22		—	9		12		1		
25	DM	Onicaș	(Romania)	11	19		—	9		8		2		
31	CB	Ninu	(Romania)	10	13		—	7		6				GS: 8 RB, 2 LB
33	GK	Cezar	(Romania)				—							
99	FW	Bibishkov	(Bulgaria)	3	5		—	3		1		1		

Last updated: 15:05, 23 May 2010 (UTC)
Source: Match reports in competitive matches, FCSB
Ordered by start team, game starts and position on pitch (from back right to front left)
0 shown as blank

Shirt numbers changed during the season
Player	New number	Old number
Emeghara	3	30
Tănase	10	6
Surdu	24	11
Pleșan	19	22

=== Goalscorers ===
Key

Player left the club in mid-season
Player joined the club in mid-season

Player	Liga I	Cupa României	Europa League	Fixture Total	Friendlies	Total
(Greece) Pantelis Kapetanos	15	2	2	19	3	22
(Romania) Bogdan Stancu	8	0	6	14	3	17
(Romania) János Székely	5	0	1	6	2	8
(Romania) Romeo Surdu	5	0	1	6	4	10
(Romania) Bănel Nicoliță	2	0	3	5	0	5
(Armenia) Arman Karamyan	5	0	0	5	0	5
(Colombia) Juan Carlos Toja	1	0	1	2	2	4
(Colombia) Dayro Moreno	2	0	0	2	1	3
(Romania) Petre Marin	1	0	0	1	0	1
(Romania) Cristian Tănase	1	0	0	1	2	3
(Romania) Ovidiu Petre	1	0	0	1	0	1
(Romania) Mihăiță Pleșan	1	0	0	1	0	1
(Bulgaria) Zhivko Zhelev	1	0	0	1	0	1
(Poland) Paweł Golański	1	0	0	1	0	1
(Poland) Rafał Grzelak	0	0	1	1	0	1
(Romania) Petre Marin	0	0	1	1	0	1
(Romania) Răzvan Ochiroșii	0	0	1	1	0	1
(Romania) Ionuț Rada	0	0	0	0	1	1
(Romania) Andrei Ionescu	0	0	0	0	1	1
Own goals
(Northern Ireland) Stephen Craigan	0	0	1	1	0	1

Last updated:15:05, 23 May 2010 (UTC)
Source: FCSB

=== Start formations ===
Qnt	Formation	Match(es)
43	4-4-2	UEL1, UEL2, UEL3, 1, UEL4, 2, 3, UEL5, 4, UEL6, 5, 6, UEL7, 7, CR1, 8, 10, UEL9, 11, 12, UEL10, 14, 15, 16, 17, UEL12, 18, 19, 20, 21, 22, 23, 24, 25, 26, 27, 28, 29, 30, 31, 32, 33, 34
2	4-3-3	UEL8, 9
2	3-4-3	CR2, UEL11
1	3-5-2	13

Last updated: 12:00, 18 May 2010 (UTC)
Source: Match reports in Competitive matches
Only competitive matches.

=== Starting XI ===
No.	Pos.	Nat.	Name	MS	Notes
1	GK	(Colombia)	Rufay	28	
18	LB	(Romania)	P. Marin	32	+4 as RB
17	CB	(Romania)	Baciu	20	+1 as RB, +1 as CM
24	CB	(Romania)	Ghionea	22	
4	RB	(Poland)	Golański	24	+1 as CB, +1 as DM
8	DM	(Romania)	Ov. Petre	17	+ 1 as CB
16	LW	(Romania)	Nicoliță	20	+18 as RW, +1 as RB
14	AM	(Colombia)	Toja	25	+2 as LW
7	RW	(Romania)	Székely	24	+5 as LW, +2 as CM
9	FW	(Greece)	Kapetanos	32	
28	FW	(Romania)	Stancu	32	

Last updated: 15:05, 23 May 2010 (UTC)
Source: Squad stats and Start formations.
Only competitive matches.
Using the most used start formation.
Ordered by position on pitch (from back right to front left).

=== Squad stats ===
	Total	Home	Away
Games played	48	23	25
Games won	25	13	12
Games drawn	13	6	7
Games lost	10	4	6
Biggest win	3–0 vs Motherwell; 3–0 vs St Patrick's	3–0 vs Motherwell; 3–0 vs St Patrick's	4–2 vs Gaz Metan; 3–1 vs Motherwell; 2–0 vs Ceahlăul; 2–0 vs Bacău; 2–0 vs Iași; 2–0 vs Internațional
Biggest lose	5–1 vs Rapid	3–1 vs Ceahlăul	5–1 vs Rapid
Clean sheets	21	11	10
Goals scored	69	35	34
Goals conceded	45	18	27
Goal difference	+24	+17	+7
Top scorer	Kapetanos (19)	11	8
Winning rate	52.08%	56.52%	48%

Last updated: 15:05, 23 May 2010 (UTC)
Source: Competitive matches

=== International appearances ===
Player	Country	Appearances	Goals
Arman Karamyan	Armenia	v. Belarus	
Artavazd Karamyan	Armenia	v. Belarus	
Pantelis Kapetanos	Greece	v. Senegal v. North Korea v. Paraguay	
Romeo Surdu	Romania	v. Hungary v. France v. Austria	
Bogdan Stancu	Romania	v. None^{1}	
Ciprian Tătărușanu	Romania	v. None^{2}	
Bănel Nicoliță	Romania	v. Poland v. Israel	
Cristian Tănase	Romania	v. Poland v. Ukraine v. North Macedonia	
Paweł Golański	Poland	v. Northern Ireland	
Mihai Onicaș	Romania U-21	v. Andorra U-21 v. Moldova U-21	
Eric Bicfalvi	Romania U-21	v. Moldova U-21 v. Latvia U-21 v. Faroe Islands U-21 v. Latvia U-21 v. Poland U-21	v. Faroe Islands U-21
Răzvan Ochiroșii	Romania U-21	v. Andorra U-21 v. Moldova U-21 v. Faroe Islands U-21	v. Moldova U-21
Andrei Ionescu	Romania U-21	v. Andorra U-21 v. Moldova U-21 v. Latvia U-21 v. Faroe Islands U-21 v. Latvia U-21 v. Poland U-21	v. Faroe Islands U-21
Cezar Lungu	Romania U-21	v. Faroe Islands U-21 v. Latvia U-21 v. Poland U-21 v. Israel U-21	
Ciprian Tătărușanu	Romania U-23	v. Italy U-23	

Notes

- ^1 Bogdan Stancu was called for Romania's game against Hungary, but in the championship match was injured and Lucescu dropped him from team.
- ^2 Ciprian Tătărușanu was called for the Romania's game against Hungary and Faroe Islands, but was not capped.

== Competitions ==
=== Overall ===
Competition	Started round	Final position / round	First match	Last match
Liga I	—	4th	2 August 2009	22 May 2010
Cupa României	Round of 32	Round of 16	22 September 2009	28 October 2009
Europa League	Second qualifying round	4th / Group stage	16 July 2009	17 December 2009

=== Liga I ===
==== League table ====
Pos	Team	Pld	W	D	L	GF	GA	GD	Pts	Qualification or relegation
2	Unirea Urziceni	34	18	12	4	53	26	+27	66	Qualification to Champions League third qualifying round
3	Vaslui	34	18	8	8	44	28	+16	62 (Note: VAS 2–1 STE; STE 2–1 VAS)	Qualification to Europa League play-off round (Note: Since 2009–10 Cupa României winners CFR Cluj and runners-up Vaslui qualified for European competitions via their league placement, the allocation of UEFA Europa League spots effectively reverted to league placement as well, with the 6th-placed team Dinamo București also qualifying.)
4	Steaua București	34	18	8	8	49	36	+13	62	Qualification to Europa League play-off round
5	Timișoara	34	15	14	5	55	27	+28	59	Qualification to Europa League third qualifying round
6	Dinamo București	34	13	14	7	48	37	+11	53	Qualification to Europa League second qualifying round

Source: LPF (in Romanian)
Rules for classification: 1) points; 2) head-to-head points; 3) head-to-head goal difference; 4) head-to-head goals scored; 5) goal difference; 6) number of goals scored.

==== Results summary ====
Overall								Home						Away					
Pld	W	D	L	GF	GA	GD	Pts	W	D	L	GF	GA	GD	W	D	L	GF	GA	GD
34	18	8	8	49	36	+13	62	10	4	3	26	16	+10	8	4	5	23	20	+3

Source: LT

==== Results by round ====
Round	1	2	3	4	5	6	7	8	9	10	11	12	13	14	15	16	17	18	19	20	21	22	23	24	25	26	27	28	29	30	31	32	33	34
Ground	A	H	H	A	H	A	H	A	H	A	H	A	H	A	H	A	H	H	A	A	H	A	H	A	H	A	H	A	H	A	HR	A	H	A
Result	W	D	L	W	L	W	W	D	D	W	D	W	W	L	W	W	W	L	D	D	W	L	W	D	W	W	W	L	D	L	W	L	W	W
Position	2	2	8	5	9	5	3	5	6	4	4	3	2	4	3	4	3	3	4	3	2	3	3	3	3	2	2	2	3	5	5	5	5	4

Source: Matches
A = Away; H = Home; W = Win; D = Draw; L = Loss

==== Matches ====
2 August 2009 Round 1	Ceahlăul Piatra Neamț	0–2	Steaua București	Piatra Neamț
20:45 EEST	Barna (yellow card) 77'	Report	(yellow card) 50', (goal) 90+1' Toja; (yellow card) 76' Onicaș; 80' Kapetanos; (yellow card) 86' Ochiroșii	Stadium: Ceahlăul; Attendance: 12,000 (approx.); Referee: Ovidiu Hațegan

9 August 2009 Round 2	Steaua București	2–2	CFR Cluj	București
20:45 EEST	Surdu 42', (yellow card) 84'; Kapetanos 65'	Report	3', (yellow card) 90+2' Koné; 54', (yellow card) 56' Flores; (yellow card) 81' Dubarbier; (yellow card) 84' Nuno Claro	Stadium: Steaua; Attendance: 17,831; Referee: Alexandru Deaconu

16 August 2009 Round 3	Steaua București	0–1	Unirea Urziceni	Piatra Neamț
20:45 EEST	P. Marin (yellow card) 21'; Onicaș (yellow card) 23'; Stancu (yellow card) 35'; Kapetanos (yellow card) 67' (yellow-red card) 82'	Report	(yellow card) 48', (goal) 74' Apostol; (yellow card) 89' Arlauskis	Stadium: Ceahlăul; Attendance: 0 (close doors); Referee: Sebastian Colțescu

23 August 2009 Round 4	Oțelul Galați	0–1	Steaua București	Galați
17:00 EEST		Report	(yellow card) 29' Székely; 58' Surdu; (yellow card) 62' (yellow-red card) 75' Stancu; (yellow card) 90' Onicaș	Stadium: Oțelul; Attendance: 8,000 (approx.); Referee: István Kovács

30 August 2009 Round 5	Steaua București	0–1	Dinamo București	București
20:45 EEST	Golański (yellow card) 45'; Ghionea (yellow card) 86'	Report	23', (yellow card) 29' Tamaș; (yellow card) 42' Cristea; (yellow card) 58' Torje	Stadium: Steaua; Attendance: 21,321; Referee: Mauro Bergonzi (Italy)

13 September 2009 Round 6	Gaz Metan Mediaș	2–4	Steaua București	Mediaș
20:00 EEST	Pârvulescu 17'; Bud 34', (yellow card) 45'; Eric (yellow card) 47'; Nohai (yellow card) 69'; Marković (red card) 90+1'	Report	11' Stancu; 51', 91' (pen.), (yellow card) 81' Székely; 75' Nicoliță	Stadium: Gaz Metan; Referee: Alexandru Deaconu

20 September 2009 Round 7	Steaua București	1–0	Pandurii Târgu Jiu	București
16:00 EEST	Rada (yellow card) 6'; Kapetanos 60'; Ghionea (yellow card) 71'; Toja (yellow card) 73' (yellow-red card) 77'	Report	(yellow card) 37' Păcurar; (yellow card) 78' Rusu; (yellow card) 82' Murgan; (yellow card) 90' Arrieta	Stadium: Steaua; Attendance: 0 (close doors); Referee: István Kovács

26 September 2009 Round 8	Brașov	0–0	Steaua București	Brașov
20:00 EEST	Abrudan (yellow card) 49'; Hadnagy (yellow card) 75'; Măldărășanu (yellow card) 89'	Report	(yellow card) 41' Ninu; (yellow card) 52' Rada; (yellow card) 69' Stancu	Stadium: Silviu Ploeșteanu; Attendance: 8,500 (approx.); Referee: Alexandru Tudor

4 October 2009 Round 9	Steaua București	1–1	Gloria Bistrița	București
18:00 EEST	P. Marin 28' (pen.); Székely (yellow card) 72'	Report	(yellow card) 9' D. Sânmărtean; 17' (o.g.) Toja; (yellow card) 28' Hora	Stadium: Steaua; Attendance: 8,000 (approx.); Referee: Cristian Balaj

17 October 2009 Round 10	Politehnica Iași	0–2	Steaua București	Iași
20:00 EEST	Munteanu (yellow card) 53'	Report	(yellow card) 52' Toja; (yellow card) 82' Pleșan; 85', (yellow card) 85' Dayro M. 90+2' Székely	Stadium: Emil Alexandrescu; Attendance: 10,000 (approx.); Referee: Marius Avram

25 October 2009 Round 11	Steaua București	1–1	Rapid București	București
20:00 EET	Ghionea (yellow card) 27'; Székely (yellow card) 29'; Toja (yellow card) 39'; Dayro M. 60'	Report	28' Herea; (yellow card) 45' Buga; (yellow card) 62' M. Constantin; (yellow card) 78' Ioniță	Stadium: Steaua; Attendance: 0 (close doors); Referee: Stefan Messner (Austria)

31 October 2009 Round 12	Politehnica Timișoara	0–1	Steaua București	Timișoara
21:45 EET	Arm. Karamyan (yellow card) 33'; Alexa (yellow card) 35'; Bourceanu (red card) 88'	Report	(yellow card) 45' Ghionea; 68' Surdu	Stadium: Dan Păltinișanu; Attendance: 25,000 (approx.); Referee: Fernando Teixeira Vitienes (Spain)

9 November 2009 Round 13	Steaua București	2–0	Unirea Alba Iulia	București
20:30 EET	Kapetanos 56', 79'	Report	(yellow card) 32' de Freitas; (yellow card) 47' Veljović; (yellow card) 57' Cernea; (yellow card) 57' Cristea	Stadium: Steaua; Attendance: 3,000 (approx.); Referee: Victor Berbecaru

21 November 2009 Round 14	Astra Ploiești	1–2	Steaua București	Ploiești
16:00 EET	Păun 52', 89', (yellow card) 60'; Gheorghe (yellow card) 70'	Report	17' Kapetanos; (yellow card) 28' Baciu	Stadium: Astra; Attendance: 5,000 (approx.); Referee: Ovidiu Hațegan

29 November 2009 Round 15	Steaua București	2–1	Vaslui	București
20:00 EET	Rada (yellow card) 51'; Golański (yellow card) 56'; Kapetanos 60'; Székely 90+3', (yellow card) 90+3'	Report	23' Gerlem; (yellow card) 38' Buhuș; (yellow card) 51' Pavlović	Stadium: Steaua; Attendance: 6,000 (approx.); Referee: Philippe Kalt (France)

7 December 2009 Round 16	FC U Craiova	1–2	Steaua București	Craiova
20:45 EET	Prepeliță 15', (yellow card) 78'; Găman (yellow card) 36'; Firțulescu (yellow card) 56'; Bărboianu (yellow card) 68'; F. Costea (yellow card) 90'	Report	4' Kapetanos; (yellow card) 44' Golański; (yellow card) 70' Pleșan; 90+2' Székely	Stadium: Ion Oblemenco; Attendance: 15,000 (approx.); Referee: Robert Dumitru

12 December 2009 Round 17	Steaua București	3–2	Internațional Curtea de Argeș	București
16:00 EET	Nicoliță 2'; Kapetanos 13'; Pleșan (yellow card) 45+1'; P. Marin (yellow card) 65'; Tănase 70', (yellow card) 70'	Report	21' Băcilă; (yellow card) 28' Neagu; 63' Zăgrean; (yellow card) 78' Abiodun; (yellow card) 84' Viera; (yellow card) 90+3' Frăsineanu	Stadium: Steaua; Attendance: 2,000 (approx.); Referee: Marius Avram

20 February 2010 Round 18	Steaua București	1–3	Ceahlăul Piatra Neamț	București
20:30 EET	Kapetanos 14'; Nicoliță (yellow card) 60' (yellow-red card) 69'; Ov. Petre (yellow card) 73'	Report	44' Onciu; (yellow card) 45', (goal) 76' Vasilache; (yellow card) 54' Dragomir; (yellow card) 60' Dikaba; (yellow card) 75', (goal) 85' Bădescu	Stadium: Steaua; Attendance: 10,000 (approx.); Referee: István Kovács

28 February 2010 Round 19	CFR Cluj	1–1	Steaua București	Cluj
20:30 EET	Cadu (yellow card) 33', (goal) 37'; N. Dică (yellow card) 36'		(yellow card) 9' Pleșan; 12' Stancu; (yellow card) 57' P. Marin	Stadium: Dr. Constantin Rădulescu; Attendance: 20,174; Referee: Alexandru Deaconu

7 March 2010 Round 20	Unirea Urziceni	2–2	Steaua București	Urziceni
20:30 EET	Frunză 3'; Onofraș 72'		7' Ov. Petre; (yellow card) 62' Székely; (yellow card) 81' Tudose; (yellow card) 88' Stancu; (yellow card) 90+1' Pepe; 90+2' Kapetanos	Stadium: Tineretului; Attendance: 6,500 (approx.); Referee: Cristian Balaj

12 March 2010 Round 21	Steaua București	1–0	Oțelul Galați	București
20:30 EET	Stancu 10'; Parpas (yellow card) 39'; Kapetanos (yellow card) 69'; Zhelev (yellow card) 75'; Rufay (yellow card) 90+2'		(yellow card) 64' S. Ilie; (yellow card) 72' Antal	Stadium: Steaua; Attendance: 8,000 (approx.); Referee: Victor Berbecaru

17 March 2010 Round 22	Dinamo București	2–0	Steaua București	București
20:30 EET	Alexe 39', (yellow card) 47'; Boștină (yellow card) 39'; Pulhac (yellow card) 43'; N'Doye (yellow card) 69'; An. Cristea 82', (yellow card) 82'		(yellow card) 43' Székely; (yellow card) 62', (red card) 66' Golański	Stadium: Dinamo; Attendance: 15,000 (approx.); Referee: Alexandru Tudor

21 March 2010 Round 23	Steaua București	2–0	Gaz Metan Mediaș	București
20:00 EET	Stancu 63'; Tănase (yellow card) 78'; Kapetanos 79' (pen.), (yellow card) 81'; P. Marin (yellow card) 90+1'		(yellow card) 51' A. Munteanu; (yellow card) 55' Silvășan	Stadium: Steaua; Attendance: 8,000 (approx.); Referee: Mugurel Drăgănescu

26 March 2010 Round 24	Pandurii Târgu Jiu	0–0	Steaua București	Târgu Jiu
20:30 EET	Martinović (yellow card) 18'; Tremonti (yellow card) 41'; Štromajer (yellow card) 79' (yellow-red card) 89'; Cardoso (yellow card) 80'; Hidișan (yellow card) 90+1'; Rusu (yellow card) 90+2'		(yellow card) 22' Stancu; (yellow card) 53' Emeghara; (yellow card) 59' Toja; (red card) 63' Ov. Petre; (yellow card) 80' Golański; (yellow card) 90+2' Surdu	Stadium: Tudor Vladimirescu; Attendance: 9,000 (approx.); Referee: Georgian Ionescu

2 April 2010 Round 25	Steaua București	1–0	Brașov	București
18:30 EEST	Pleșan 6', (yellow card) 33'; Tănase (yellow card) 46'; A. Karamyan (yellow card) 63'; Parpas (yellow card) 68'; Pepe (yellow card) 90+1'		(yellow card) 5' S. Stancu; (yellow card) 31' Savić; (yellow card) 36' Nuno Diogo; (yellow card) 49' Ilyéș; (yellow card) 75' Voicu	Stadium: Steaua; Attendance: 4,000 (approx.); Referee: Augustus Constantin

7 April 2010 Round 26	Gloria Bistrița	1–2	Steaua București	Bistrița
20:30 EEST	Moraes 50'; Zé Rui (yellow card) 72'		16' A. Karamyan; (yellow card) 27' Nicoliță; 51' Stancu; (yellow card) 66' P. Marin; (yellow card) 90+3' Surdu	Stadium: Gloria; Attendance: 7,000 (approx.); Referee: Cristian Balaj

12 April 2010 Round 27	Steaua București	2–1	Politehnica Iași	București
20:30 EEST	Parpas (yellow card) 49'; Surdu 54'; Nicoliță (yellow card) 66'; Kapetanos 82'; P. Marin (yellow card) 87'		5' Păun; (yellow card) 12' Mihajlov; (yellow card) 36' Bujor; (yellow card) 45+2' Nogo; (yellow card) 62' Ad. Ilie	Stadium: Steaua; Attendance: 3,500 (approx.); Referee: Marian Balaci

18 April 2010 Round 28	Rapid București	5–1	Steaua București	București
20:00 EEST	Ioniță 7', 17', (yellow card) 31'; Césinha 22' M. Constantin 33' (pen.); Lazăr (yellow card) 44'; Grigorie (yellow card) 63'; Helder 73'		14' (pen.) Kapetanos; (yellow card) 76' Ov. Petre	Stadium: Giulești-Valentin Stănescu; Attendance: 12,000 (approx.); Referee: Marius Avram

25 April 2010 Round 29	Steaua București	3–3	Politehnica Timișoara	București
20:30 EEST	Golański 32', (yellow card) 82'; Kapetanos 80' (pen.); Parpas (yellow card) 84'; Zhelev (yellow card) 87', (goal) 90+3'; Ov. Petre (yellow card) 90+1'		(yellow card) 37' Goga; (yellow card) 41' Čišovský; 48' Cociș; (yellow card) 55' Dédé; (yellow card) 79' Taborda; 85' (pen.), 88' Contra	Stadium: Steaua; Attendance: 8,000 (approx.); Referee: Sebastian Colțescu

1 May 2010 Round 30	Unirea Alba Iulia	2–1	Steaua București	Alba Iulia
17:00 EEST	Veljović 24'; Rotaru (yellow card) 80'; Fl. Dan 83'		(yellow card) 14' Nicoliță; (yellow card) 42' P. Marin; 43' A. Karamyan	Stadium: Victoria-Cetate; Attendance: 7,000 (approx.); Referee: Theodor Crăciunescu

5 May 2010 Round 31	Steaua București	2–0	Astra Ploiești	Buzău
20:30 EEST	Stancu 7'; A. Karamyan (yellow card) 17', (goal) 51'; Emeghara (yellow card) 79'		(yellow card) 42' Ganea	Stadium: Municipal; Attendance: 10,000 (approx.); Referee: Cătălin Buși

10 May 2010 Round 32	Vaslui	2–1	Steaua București	Vaslui
20:30 EEST	Gladstone (yellow card) 54'; Burdujan 68' (pen.), (yellow card) 90'; Papp 82'; Zubar (yellow card) 88'; Genchev (yellow card) 89'		(yellow card) 2' Kapetanos; 45' Stancu	Stadium: Municipal; Attendance: 8,000 (approx.); Referee: István Kovács

16 May 2010 Round 33	Steaua București	2–0	FC U Craiova	București
22:00 EEST	Pleșan (yellow card) 29'; P. Marin (yellow card) 45'; Zhelev (yellow card) 49'; A. Karamyan 69', 78'; Karamyan (yellow card) 88'; Ov. Petre (yellow card) 90+3'		(yellow card) 50' M. Costea; (yellow card) 68' Dănănae; (yellow card) 72' Barbu	Stadium: Steaua; Attendance: 3,000 (approx.); Referee: Robert Dumitru

22 May 2010 Round 34	Internațional Curtea de Argeș	0–2	Steaua București	Mioveni
16:30 EEST	Chiricheș (yellow card) 20'		21' Stancu; 51' Surdu	Stadium: Dacia; Attendance: 5,000 (approx.); Referee: Mugurel Drăgănescu

=== Cupa României ===
==== Results ====
23 September 2009 Round of 32	FCM Bacău	0–2	Steaua București	Bacău
20:30 EEST	Doboș (yellow card) 33'	Report	8', 50' Kapetanos; (yellow card) 32' Bicfalvi; (yellow card) 40' P. Marin; (yellow card) 74' Ionescu; (yellow card) 80' Ochiroșii	Stadium: Municipal; Attendance: 9,000 (approx.); Referee: Florin Ghimbășan

28 October 2009 Round of 16	Gloria Bistrița	0–0 (a.e.t.) (5–4 p)	Steaua București	Bistrița
20:15 EET	Velcovici (yellow card) 25'; D. Sânmărtean (yellow card) 64' (yellow-red card) 102'; Năstase (yellow card) 90+1'; Borbély (yellow card) 95'	Report	(yellow card) 14' Ochiroșii; (yellow card) 18' Pleșan; (yellow card) 19' Surdu; (yellow card) 75' Bibishkov; (red card) 82' Onicaș; (yellow card) 109' Dayro M.	Stadium: Gloria; Attendance: 5,000 (approx.); Referee: István Kovács
	Penalties
	Borbély (penalty scored); Năstase (penalty scored); Săceanu (penalty scored); Hora (penalty scored); Coroian (penalty scored)		(penalty scored) Székely; (penalty scored) Baciu; (penalty scored) Pleșan; (penalty missed) Bibishkov; (penalty scored) Dayro M.

=== UEFA Europa League ===
==== Qualifying rounds ====
===== Second qualifying round =====
16 July 2009 First leg	Steaua București (Romania)	2–0	(Hungary) Újpest	București, Romania
20:30 EEST	Ochiroșii (yellow card) 35'; Kapetanos (red card) 42'; Surdu 46'; Goian (yellow card) 59'; Toja (yellow card) 62'; P. Marin (yellow card) 69'; Stancu 72'	Report	(yellow card) 23' Kabát; (yellow card) 34' (yellow-red card) 54' Korcsmár; (yellow card) 42' Vaskó; (yellow card) 44' Pollák	Stadium: Steaua; Attendance: 19,003; Referee: Michalis Koukoulakis (Greece)

23 July 2009 Second leg	Újpest (Hungary)	1–2 (1–4 agg.)	(Romania) Steaua București	Budapest, Hungary
19:45 CEST	Tisza (yellow card) 22'; Dudić (yellow card) 30'; Vaskó 82'	Report	(yellow card) 18' P. Marin; 58', (yellow card) 72' Székely; (yellow card) 63' Toja; 66' Grzelak	Stadium: Szusza Ferenc; Attendance: 9,678; Referee: Andre Marriner (England)

===== Third qualifying round =====
30 July 2009 First leg	Steaua București (Romania)	3–0	(Scotland) Motherwell	București, Romania
20:45 EEST	Craigan 31' (o.g.); Goian (penalty missed) 34' (pen.), (yellow card) 50'; Nicoliță 45+1'; Stancu 60'; Ninu (yellow card) 73'	Report	(yellow card) 78' Craigan	Stadium: Steaua; Attendance: 21,446; Referee: Cüneyt Çakır (Turkey)

6 August 2009 Second leg	Motherwell (Scotland)	1–3 (1–6 agg.)	(Romania) Steaua București	Airdrie, Scotland
19:45 WEST	Forbes 17', (yellow card) 58'	Report	55' (pen.) P. Marin; (yellow card) 63' A. Ionescu; 67', 84' Stancu; (yellow card) 75' Ninu	Stadium: Excelsior; Attendance: 4,975; Referee: Carlos Clos Gomez (Spain)

===== Play-off round =====
20 August 2009 First leg	Steaua București (Romania)	3–0	(Republic of Ireland) St Patrick's Athletic	București, Romania
20:30 EEST	Nicoliță 56'; Stancu 65', 80'	Report	(yellow card) 27' Fitzpatrick; (yellow card) 63' Quigley	Stadium: Steaua; Attendance: 0 (close doors); Referee: Alexei Nikolaev (Russia)

27 August 2009 Second leg	St Patrick's Athletic (Republic of Ireland)	1–2 (1–5 agg.)	(Romania) Steaua București	Dublin, Republic of Ireland
19:45 WEST	O'Connor 49'	Report	80' Nicoliță; 89' Ochiroșii	Stadium: RDS Arena; Referee: Jiri Jech (Czech Republic)

==== Group stage ====
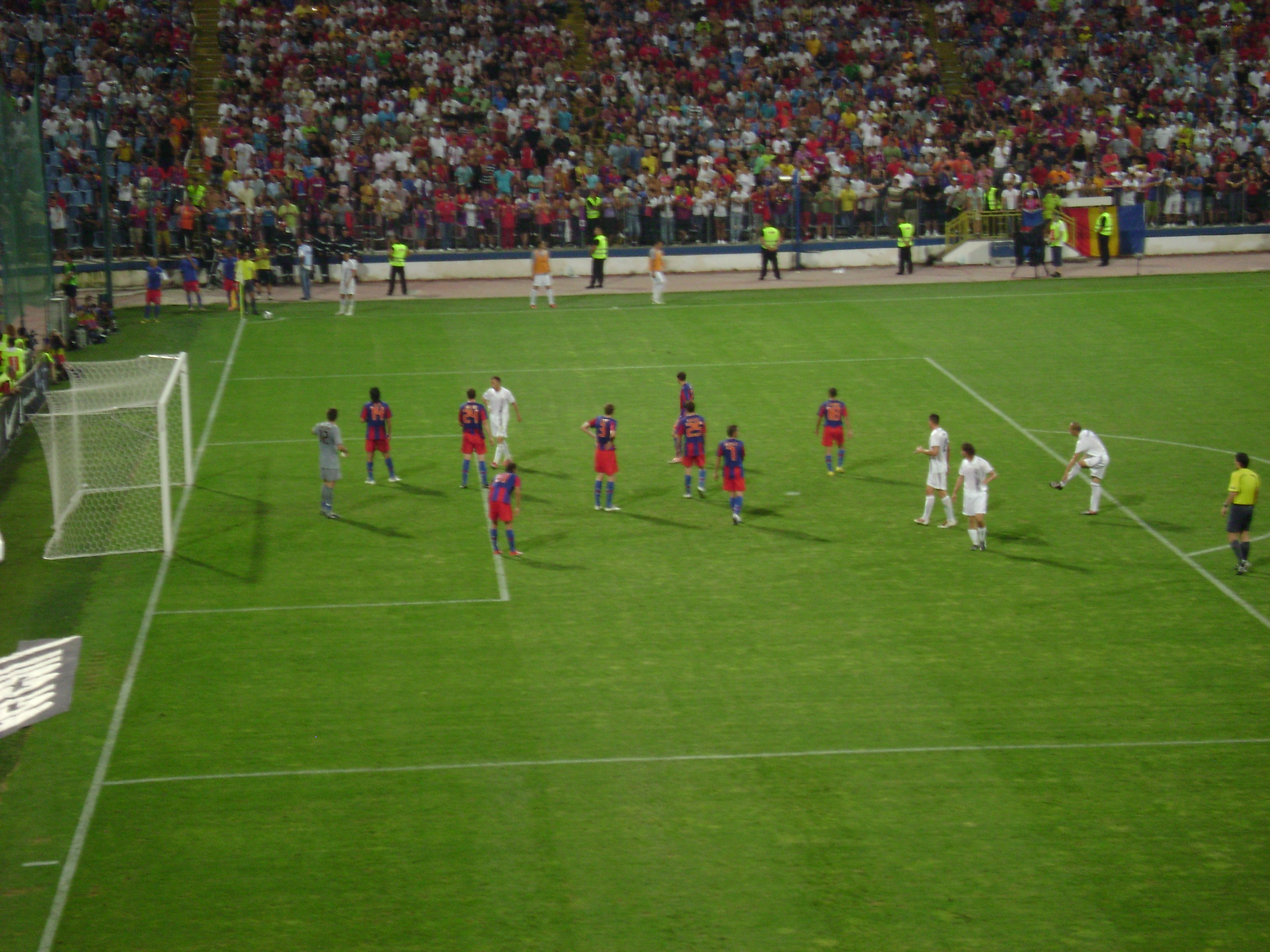
Corner kick during a match with Újpest FC.

Group H standings
Pos	Team	Pld	W	D	L	GF	GA	GD	Pts	Qualification	FEN	TWE	SHF	STE
1	(Turkey) Fenerbahçe	6	5	0	1	8	3	+5	15	Advance to knockout phase	—	1–2	1–0	3–1
2	(Netherlands) Twente	6	2	2	2	5	6	−1	8	Advance to knockout phase	0–1	—	2–1	0–0
3	(Moldova) Sheriff Tiraspol	6	1	2	3	4	5	−1	5		0–1	2–0	—	1–1
4	(Romania) Steaua București	6	0	4	2	3	6	−3	4		0–1	1–1	0–0	—

Source: Soccerway

===== Results =====
17 September 2009 Matchday 1	Steaua București (Romania)	0–0	(Moldova) Sheriff Tiraspol	București, Romania
22:05 EEST	Ninu (yellow card) 88'	Report	(yellow card) 22' Kuchuk; (yellow card) 32' Rodríguez; (yellow card) 81' Tsynya	Stadium: Steaua; Attendance: 0 (close doors); Referee: Pavel Kralovec (Czech Republic)

1 October 2009 Matchday 2	Twente (Netherlands)	0–0	(Romania) Steaua București	Twente, Netherlands
19:00 CEST	Stoch (yellow card) 54'	Report	(yellow card) 26' Rada; (yellow card) 87' Székely	Stadium: De Grolsch Veste; Referee: Gianluca Rocchi (Italy)

22 October 2009 Matchday 3	Steaua București (Romania)	0–1	(Turkey) Fenerbahçe	București, Romania
20:00 EEST	Bicfalvi (yellow card) 19'; Golański (yellow card) 37'; Toja (yellow card) 88'	Report	(yellow card) 28' Lugano; (yellow card) 45+2', (goal) 59' Kazim-Richards; (yellow card) 82' Emre; (yellow card) 90' Gönül	Stadium: Steaua; Attendance: 15,000 (approx.); Referee: Douglas McDonald (Scotland)

5 November 2009 Matchday 4	Fenerbahçe (Turkey)	3–1	(Romania) Steaua București	Istanbul, Turkey
22:05 EET	André Santos 15', (yellow card) 43'; Bilica 51'; Topuz (yellow card) 66'; Alex 67'; Kazim-Richards (yellow card) 70'	Report	38' Kapetanos	Stadium: Şükrü Saracoğlu; Referee: Thomas Einwaller (Austria)

2 December 2009 Matchday 5	Sheriff Tiraspol (Moldova)	1–1	(Romania) Steaua București	Tiraspol, Moldova
20:00 EET	Rouamba (yellow card) 79'; Rodríguez (yellow card) 80'; Diedhiou 83'	Report	(yellow card) 27' Bicfalvi; 87' Toja; (yellow card) 89' Surdu; (red card) 90+1' P. Marin	Stadium: Sheriff; Referee: Tommy Skjerven (Norway)

17 December 2009 Matchday 6	Steaua București (Romania)	1–1	(Netherlands) Twente	București, Romania
22:05 EET	Kapetanos 18'; Tănase (yellow card) 37'; Rada (yellow card) 39'; Golański (yellow card) 57'; Ninu (yellow card) 79'	Report	35' Stam	Stadium: Steaua; Attendance: 800 (approx.); Referee: Jorge Sousa (Portugal)

=== Non competitive matches ===
1 July 2009 Matchday 1	Steaua București (Romania)	3–0	(Slovenia) Celje
19:30 EET	Golański (yellow card) 38'; Surdu 48', 59' (pen.); A. Ionescu 51'	Report	(yellow card) 31' Lovrečič

3 July 2009 Matchday 2	Steaua București (Romania)	2–0	(Czech Republic) Bohemians Prague (Střížkov)
19:30 EET	Székely 58'; Toja 72'	Report

5 July 2009 Matchday 3	Steaua București (Romania)	1–0	(Croatia) Dinamo Zagreb
19:30 EET	Kapetanos 69'	Report

7 July 2009 Matchday 4	Steaua București (Romania)	1–2	(Bulgaria) CSKA Sofia
	Ochiroșii (yellow card) 61'; Surdu 89'	Report	12' Miguel; 57' Kotev

11 July 2009 Matchday 5	Steaua București (Romania)	0–0	(Turkey) Gençlerbirliği	București, Romania
21:45 EET		Report		Stadium: Steaua; Referee: Claudiu Baboia

11 October 2009 Matchday 6	Steaua București (Romania)	3–0	(Romania) FC Snagov
11:00 EET	Dayro M. 45'; Toja 55'; Rada 75'	Report

26 January 2010 Matchday 7	Red Bull Salzburg (Austria)	1–1	(Romania) Steaua București
17:00 EET	Afolabi 61'	Report	23' Stancu

1 February 2010 Matchday 8	Vasas (Hungary)	0–2	(Romania) Steaua București
18:00 EET		Report	53' Tănase; 69' Kapetanos

5 February 2010 Matchday 9	Steaua București (Romania)	1–1	(Croatia) Rijeka
17:30 EET	Székely 51'	Report	41' Kreilach

7 February 2010 Matchday 10	Steaua București (Romania)	3–2	(Bulgaria) Lokomotiv Sofia
18:00 EET	Tănase 41'; Stancu 62', 72'	Report	68' Yordanov; 82' Špišic

9 February 2010 Matchday 11	Steaua București (Romania)	0–2	(Russia) Terek Grozny
17:30 EET		Report	33' Lahiyalov; 76' Asildarov

11 February 2010 Matchday 12	Steaua București (Romania)	2–0	(Belarus) BATE Borisov
18:00 EET	Kapetanos 39'; Surdu 88'	Report

== UEFA Club rankings ==
This is the current UEFA Club Rankings, including season 2008–09.

Rank	Team	Points	Mvmnt
27	(Greece) Panathinaikos	56.633	▲ (+10)
28	(Scotland) Glasgow Rangers	56.575	▼ (–4)
29	(England) Tottenham	55.899	▲ (+4)
30	(England) Newcastle	54.899	▼ (–16)
31	(Netherlands) Ajax	54.825	▲ (+12)
32	(Romania) Steaua București	53.781	▼ (–3)
33	(Spain) Espanyol	52.853	▼ (–7)
34	(Greece) Olympiacos	52.632	▲ (+10)
35	(Turkey) Fenerbahçe	52.445	▲ (+10)
36	(Germany) Bayer Leverkusen	51.339	▼ (–4)
37	(Switzerland) Basel	51.050	▲ (+5)

== Staff ==
=== Coaching staff ===
Position	Staff
Head Coach	(Romania) Mihai Stoichiță (from 18 Sept.)
Head Coach	(Italy) Cristiano Bergodi (until 17 Sept.)
Assistant Coach	(Romania) Mihai Teja
General Manager	(Romania) Basarab Panduru (from 14 Sept)
Sports Manager	(Italy) Renzo Rossi (until 17 Sept.)
Team Manager	(Romania) Marius Ianuli
Goalkeeping Coach	(Romania) Andrei Speriatu
Fitness Coach	(Romania) Ionel Colonel
Fitness Coach	(Romania) Horea Codorean
Medic	(Romania) Radu Paligora
Medic Assistant	(Romania) Iulian Mircea
Masseur	(Romania) Ion Budugă
Masseur	(Romania) Constantin Moroiu
Masseur	(Romania) Cătălin Fandel

Last updated: 13:44, 11 September 2009 (UTC)
Source: FCSB

=== Other information ===
Owner	(Romania) George Becali
President	(Romania) Valeriu Argăseală
Vice-Chairman	(Romania) Teia Sponte
Vicepresident	(Romania) Iulian Ghiorghișor
Executive Director	(Romania) Ovidiu Costeșin
Marketing Director	(Romania) Bobby Durbac
Press Officer	(Romania) Cătălin Făiniși
Board Room Member	(Romania) Lucian Becali
Board Room Member	(Romania) Vasile Geambazi
Censor	(Romania) Victor Manole
Censor	(Romania) Mariana Istudor
Supplementary Censor	(Romania) Virgil Laurențiu Găman
Supplementary Censor	(Romania) Maria Apostoiu
Stock Holder	(Romania) Vasile Geambazi (37%)
Stock Holder	(Romania) Constantin Geambazi (30%)
Stock Holder	(Romania) Cătălin Ciubotă (26%)
Stock Holder	(Romania) Tomaida Bădescu (4%)
Stock Holder	(Romania) Marius Ianuli (3%)

Updated to match played 9 August 2009
Source: FCSB
