= Emeghara =

Emeghara audio is a surname of Igbo origin in south eastern Nigeria.

== Notable people with the surname include ==
- Ifeanyi Emeghara (born 1984), Nigerian footballer
- Innocent Emeghara (born 1989), Nigerian-born Swiss footballer
