= Mihăiță Pleșan =

Romanian footballer

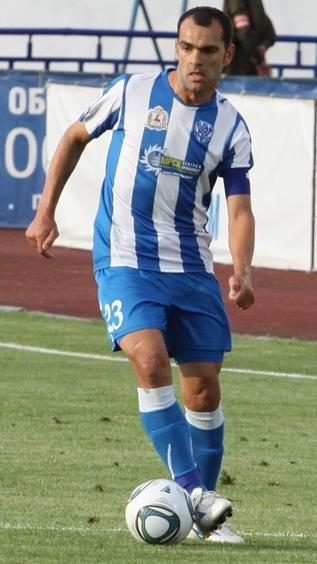
- Pleșan with Volga Nizhny Novgorod in 2011

Personal information
- Full name: Mihăiță Păunel Pleșan
- Date of birth: 19 February 1983 (age 43)
- Place of birth: Moldova Nouă, Romania
- Height: 1.83 m (6 ft 0 in)
- Position: Central midfielder

Youth career
- Minerul Moldova Nouă

Senior career*
Years	Team	Apps	(Gls)
2000–2005	FC Universitatea Craiova	67	(13)
2005	Dinamo București	12	(2)
2006–2007	Politehnica Timișoara	30	(6)
2007–2010	Steaua București	40	(3)
2009–2010	Steaua II București	5	(0)
2010–2013	Volga Nizhny Novgorod	36	(2)
2013–2014	CS Universitatea Craiova	28	(4)
Total		218	(30)

International career
2003–2005	Romania U21	7	(1)
2003–2007	Romania	7	(1)
- * Club domestic league appearances and goals

Mihăiță Păunel Pleșan (born 19 February 1983) is a Romanian former professional footballer who played as a central midfielder.

== Club career ==
Pleșan was born on 19 February 1983 in Moldova Nouă, Romania and began playing junior-level football at age nine for local club Minerul. He started his senior career at FC Universitatea Craiova, making his Divizia A debut on 14 April 2001 under coach Ilie Balaci in a 2–0 away loss to Astra Ploiești. He scored his first goal in the competition on 15 April 2003 when he closed the score in a 2–1 win over Național București. In the 2004–05 season, Pleșan had the most prolific season of his career by scoring eight goals, including two doubles against CFR Cluj and Gloria Bistrița. However, "U" Craiova was relegated at the end of the season, so Pleșan, along with several other teammates, went to play for Dinamo București.

At Dinamo, Pleșan netted his first goal in September 2005 in a 5–2 win over rivals Rapid București, then he scored another one in November when he opened the score in a 2–1 away victory against FC Vaslui. He played four games under coach Ioan Andone in the 2005–06 UEFA Cup campaign, in which they eliminated Everton with a historical 5–2 on aggregate, reaching the group stage. After only half a season spent at the club, The Red Dogs sold him to Politehnica Timișoara, where he was wanted by coach Gheorghe Hagi, for a fee estimated by the Romanian press between €750,000–800,000. Pleșan helped the team reach the 2007 Cupa României final where coach Valentin Velcea used him in the first 58 minutes of the 2–0 loss to Rapid. He started the 2007–08 season strong by scoring in the first two rounds a goal against Politehnica Iași and a brace against CFR Cluj. Thus, he earned a transfer to Steaua București who paid a fee of €1.5 million, reuniting with coach Hagi. In June 2009, at the end of a game against Unirea Urziceni, Pleșan and teammate Sorin Ghionea got into a fight in the locker room. He made one appearance in the 2008–09 Champions League group stage, a 1–0 home loss to Fiorentina. However, his spell with The Military Men was marked by injuries. After three years at Steaua, including a period playing for the team's satellite, he was transferred by Russian second-tier side, Volga Nizhny Novgorod, for €100,000. He helped them gain promotion to the first league by the end of the season. He made his Russian Premier League debut on 14 March 2011 when coach Omari Tetradze used him the entire match in a 2–0 victory against Tom Tomsk. Pleșan scored his first league goal for Volga on 2 April in a 2–0 win over Dynamo Moscow, then on 11 September he opened the score with a spectacular 25-meter shot in an eventual 2–1 loss to Anzhi Makhachkala. During his time with Volga, he was teammates with fellow Romanians János Székely and Adrian Ropotan.

In September 2013, Pleșan returned to Craiova, signing with second league side CS Universitatea. In the same month, he and other teammates got into a brawl with opponents from ASA Târgu Mureș, receiving a two match ban for his acts. In November, while he was warming up before a derby against his former club, FC Universitatea, he got attacked by the opponents' goalkeeper Andrei Preda. Subsequently, Preda ended up being banned for 16 matches by the Romanian Football Federation's Disciplinary Commission. With him as captain, the team finished the 2013–14 season in first place, earning promotion to Liga I. There, after being used rarely in the first half of the season, 31-year-old Pleșan ended his contract with the club, thus retiring. He concluded his career with a total of 158 appearances with 24 goals in the Romanian top-league and six games in European competitions.

== International career ==
Pleșan played seven games and scored one goal for Romania, making his debut on 16 November 2003 when coach Anghel Iordănescu sent him in the 73rd minute to replace Flavius Stoican in a 1–0 friendly loss to Italy. In his following game, also a friendly, he opened the score when he took the ball 30 meters from the opponents goalpost, managed a slalom between three defenders and finished with a spectacular shot into Oliver Kahn's goal, as Romania earned a 5–1 win over Germany. Afterwards he was compared with Gheorghe Hagi by the Romanian press, and attracted the interest of coach Arsène Wenger, who considered signing him for Arsenal, but the transfer was never fulfilled. In the following years, Pleșan played two games during the 2006 World Cup qualifiers, making his last appearance for The Tricolours in a 2–0 home victory against Slovenia in the Euro 2008 qualifiers.

== Career statistics ==
Scores and results list Romania's goal tally first, score column indicates score after each Pleșan goal.

List of international goals scored by Mihăiță Pleșan
No.	Date	Venue	Opponent	Score	Result	Competition
1	28 April 2004	Stadionul Giulești-Valentin Stănescu, Bucharest, Romania	Germany	1–0	5–1	Friendly

== Honours ==
Politehnica Timișoara

- Cupa României runner-up: 2006–07

CS Universitatea Craiova

- Liga II: 2013–14
