= Marc Nierga =

Spanish footballer

Personal information
- Full name: Marc Nierga Martí
- Date of birth: 15 April 1992 (age 34)
- Place of birth: Girona, Spain
- Height: 1.82 m (5 ft 11 1/2 in)
- Position: Forward

Team information
- Current team: FC Santa Coloma
- Number: 9

Youth career
- Espanyol
- 2010–2011: Zaragoza

Senior career*
Years	Team	Apps	(Gls)
2011–2012	Zaragoza B	35	(10)
2012–2014	Osasuna B	47	(10)
2014	Deportivo B	10	(1)
2014–2015	Guijuelo	32	(14)
2015–2016	Alcorcón	1	(0)
2016–2017	Granada B	16	(1)
2017–2018	Lleida Esportiu	54	(8)
2018–2019	Olot	18	(1)
2019	Ebro	13	(0)
2019–2020	Langreo	26	(7)
2020–2021	Calahorra	23	(0)
2021–2022	Alzira	4	(0)
2022–2023	Peralada	26	(9)
2023–	FC Santa Coloma	8	(2)
- * Club domestic league appearances and goals as of 29 March 2024

Marc Nierga Martí (born 15 April 1992) is a Spanish footballer who plays for FC Santa Coloma as a forward.

== Football career ==
Born in Girona, Catalonia, Nierga was a product of Real Zaragoza's youth system. He made his debuts as a senior with the reserves in the 2011–12 campaign, in Segunda División B.

On 5 June 2012 Nierga moved to another reserve team, CA Osasuna B also in the third level. On 29 January 2014, after suffering relegation, he joined Deportivo de La Coruña's B-side, in Tercera División.

On 18 June 2014 Nierga returned to the third division, signing for CD Guijuelo. After scoring 14 goals during the season, he joined Segunda División side AD Alcorcón on 13 June of the following year, along with Guijuelo teammate Răzvan Ochiroșii.

On 9 September 2015 Nierga made his professional debut, starting in a 0–1 home loss against SD Ponferradina, for the season's Copa del Rey. On 8 July of the following year, after contributing with only one appearance in the league, he rescinded his contract, and signed for Granada CF B four days later.
