= Ciprian Tătărușanu =

Romanian footballer (born 1986)

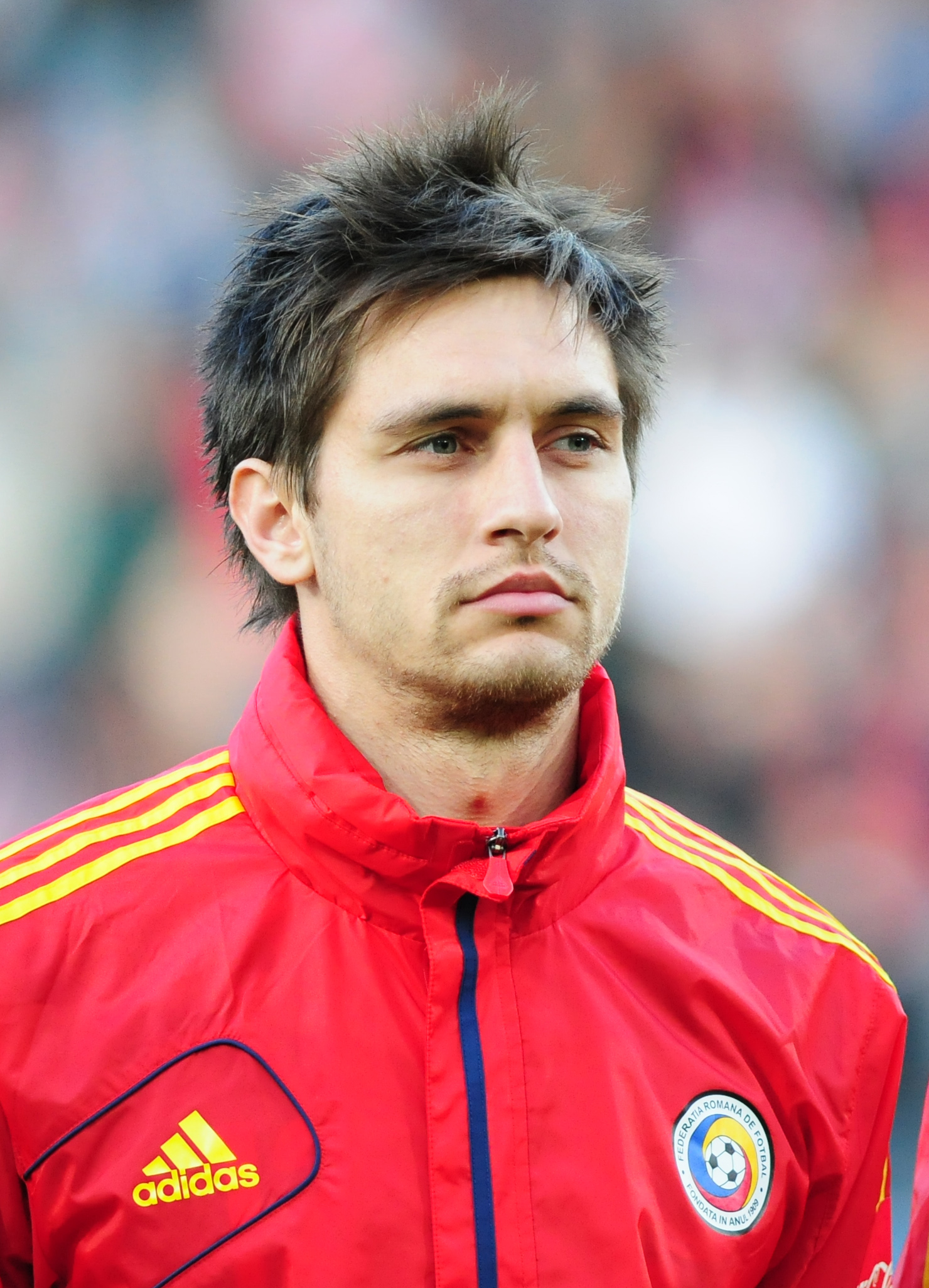
- Tătărușanu with Romania in 2012

Personal information
- Full name: Anton Ciprian Tătărușanu
- Date of birth: 9 February 1986 (age 40)
- Place of birth: Bucharest, Romania
- Height: 1.98 m (6 ft 6 in)
- Position: Goalkeeper

Youth career
- 1998–2001: CSȘ 2 București
- 2001–2004: Juventus București

Senior career*
Years	Team	Apps	(Gls)
2003–2006	Juventus București	29	(0)
2007–2008	Gloria Bistrița	26	(0)
2008–2014	Steaua București	134	(0)
2008–2009	→ Gloria Bistrița (loan)	19	(0)
2014–2017	Fiorentina	81	(0)
2017–2019	Nantes	64	(0)
2019–2020	Lyon	2	(0)
2020–2023	AC Milan	23	(0)
2023–2024	Abha	33	(0)
Total		411	(0)

International career
2006–2009	Romania U21	13	(0)
2009–2020	Romania	74	(0)
- * Club domestic league appearances and goals

Anton Ciprian Tătărușanu (Romanian pronunciation: [anˈton tʃipriˈan tətəruˈʃanu]; born 9 February 1986) is a Romanian former professional footballer who played as a goalkeeper.

He started his senior career in Romania with Juventus București, going on to represent Gloria Bistrița and FC Steaua București in the country. Tătărușanu made over 180 appearances in all competitions for the latter, and in the summer of 2014 joined Fiorentina on a free transfer. After three seasons with the Viola, he moved to France with spells at Nantes and Lyon. In September 2020, Tătărușanu transferred back to Italy and signed for AC Milan.

Tătărușanu earned 73 caps for the Romania senior team, with which he made his debut in 2010. He was a member of the squad that participated at the UEFA Euro 2016, starting in all three group stage matches of the competition. Four years later, Tătărușanu announced his retirement from the national team at age 34.

== Club career ==
=== Early career ===
Born in Bucharest, Tătărușanu began his football career with local club, Juventus, starting to play senior level football at age 16 in the second division under the guidance of coach Marin Barbu. He later joined Gloria Bistrița, making his first division debut under coach Ioan Sabău in a 1–0 away victory over Unirea Urziceni on 23 May 2007.

=== Steaua București ===
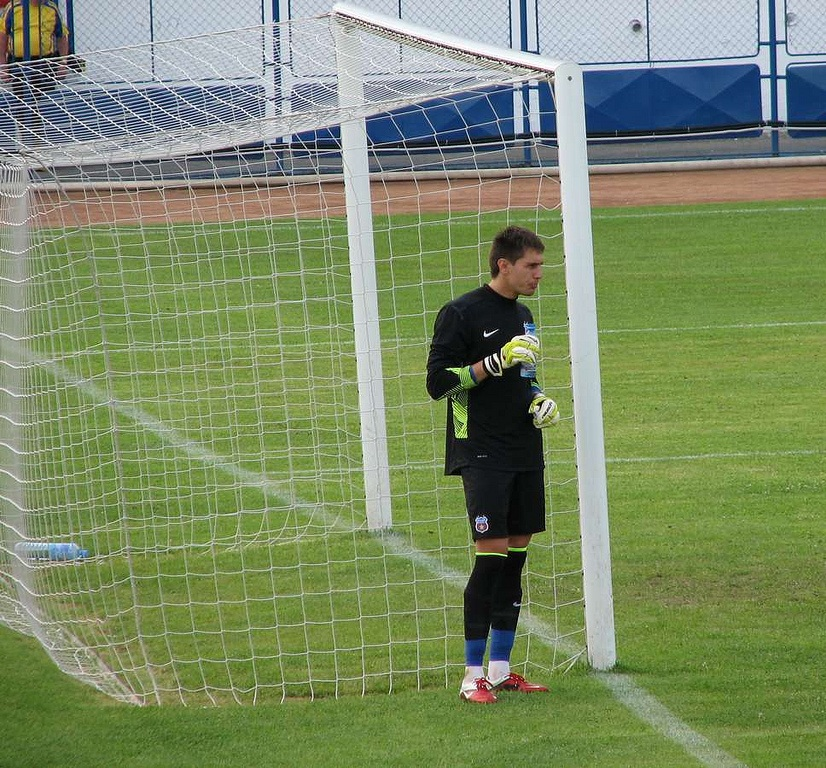
Tătărușanu with Steaua București in 2011

In May 2008, it was announced that 22-year-old Tătărușanu was transferred to FC Steaua București for a fee of €1.5 million. He spent the following season on loan at Gloria Bistrița, as the Roș-albaștrii already had a first-choice goalkeeper in the person of Róbinson Zapata.

Tătărușanu made his European debut on 16 July 2009, in a 2–0 victory against Hungarian side Újpest in the UEFA Europa League. On 2 August, he played his first Liga I game for Steaua in a 2–0 win over Ceahlăul Piatra Neamț. On 19 August 2010, he helped his team progress further to the Europa League group stage after making two saves at the penalty shootout against Grasshopper.

In June 2011, it was reported that Napoli submitted a €3 million bid for the transfer of Tătărușanu, but the offer was rejected. During his spell in the capital, he amassed competitive totals of 187 games and won four domestic trophies.

=== Fiorentina ===
Tătărușanu refused to renew his contract with Steaua București and left the club on Bosman ruling, subsequently signing a five-year deal with Italian team Fiorentina on 9 June 2014. He made his debut for the Viola on 18 September, in a 3–0 Europa League group stage victory over Guingamp.

He totalled seven appearances in the competition, including a 1–1 round of 32 draw at Tottenham Hotspur. On 6 January 2015, he played his first Serie A match, a 0–1 loss to Parma. Tătărușanu was then chosen in the starting eleven for eight consecutive games, until a 1–1 draw with Torino. He made his last appearance of the 2014–15 season in the final league fixture, a 3–0 win over Chievo.

Following the departure of Neto to Juventus in July 2015, Tătărușanu became the undisputed first-choice goalkeeper for Fiorentina, with his good display earning him the Gazeta Sporturilor's 2015 Romanian Footballer of the Year award.

=== Nantes ===
In late July 2017, Tătărușanu was transferred by French club Nantes for an undisclosed fee. He made his competitive debut on 12 August in a 0–1 defeat to Marseille, being named man of the match for his performance. On 20 December 2017, he finished second behind Constantin Budescu in the 2017 Romanian Footballer of the Year award.

Tătărușanu amassed 37 appearances in his first campaign with "the Canaries", all in the Ligue 1, and managed to keep twelve clean sheets. In early April 2019, he saved two penalty kicks in successive matches; the first in a 0–3 Coupe de France loss to Paris Saint-Germain, and the second in a 0–1 league loss to Toulouse.

=== Lyon ===
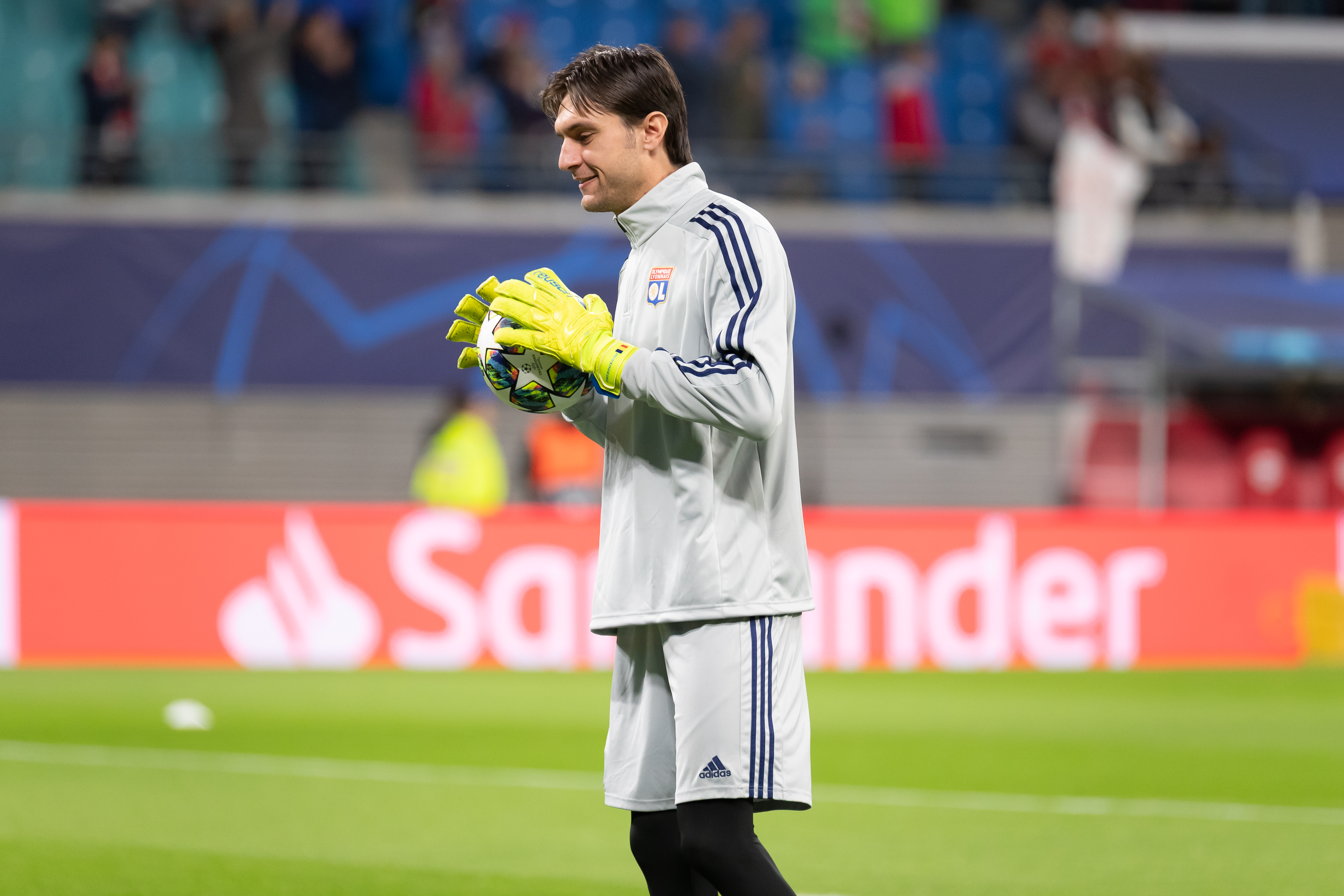
Tătărușanu training with Lyon before a Champions League match against RB Leipzig in 2019.

On 13 June 2019, Tătărușanu chose to stay in France and joined Olympique Lyonnais as a free agent. He recorded his debut on 18 December that year, in a Coupe de la Ligue 4–1 win against Toulouse. He only played six matches overall during his one-year spell at Lyon, as he was considered a backup option to regular starter Anthony Lopes.

=== AC Milan ===
On 12 September 2020, AC Milan announced Tătărușanu as their new player after he agreed to a three-year deal with the club. One day earlier, Lyon had revealed the transfer fee for the 34-year-old to be €500,000.

In the position of second-choice goalkeeper behind Gianluigi Donnarumma, he made his debut on 26 October in a 3–3 league draw with Roma, after the former tested positive for COVID-19. Tătărușanu played in a Derby della Madonnina in the Coppa Italia in January 2021, being praised for his performance in the media despite his team being defeated 2–1 by Inter Milan.

The next season, Milan continued with Tătărușanu as their backup goalkeeper, this time behind Mike Maignan, Milan's acquisition after the departure of Donnarumma to Paris Saint-Germain in the summer. On 13 October 2021, Maignan was operated on his left wrist and ruled out for two and a half months. With Tătărușanu in goal, Milan went on a four-game winning streak in the Serie A against Hellas Verona, Bologna, Torino and Roma. On 7 November, Tătărușanu was Milan's goalkeeper in the Milan Derby, where he made a penalty save against Lautaro Martínez in an eventual 1–1 draw.

=== Abha ===
On 10 August 2023, Saudi side Abha announced the signing of Tătărușanu.

=== Retirement ===
On 11 September 2024, Tătărușanu announced on his social media account that he has retired from football.

== International career ==
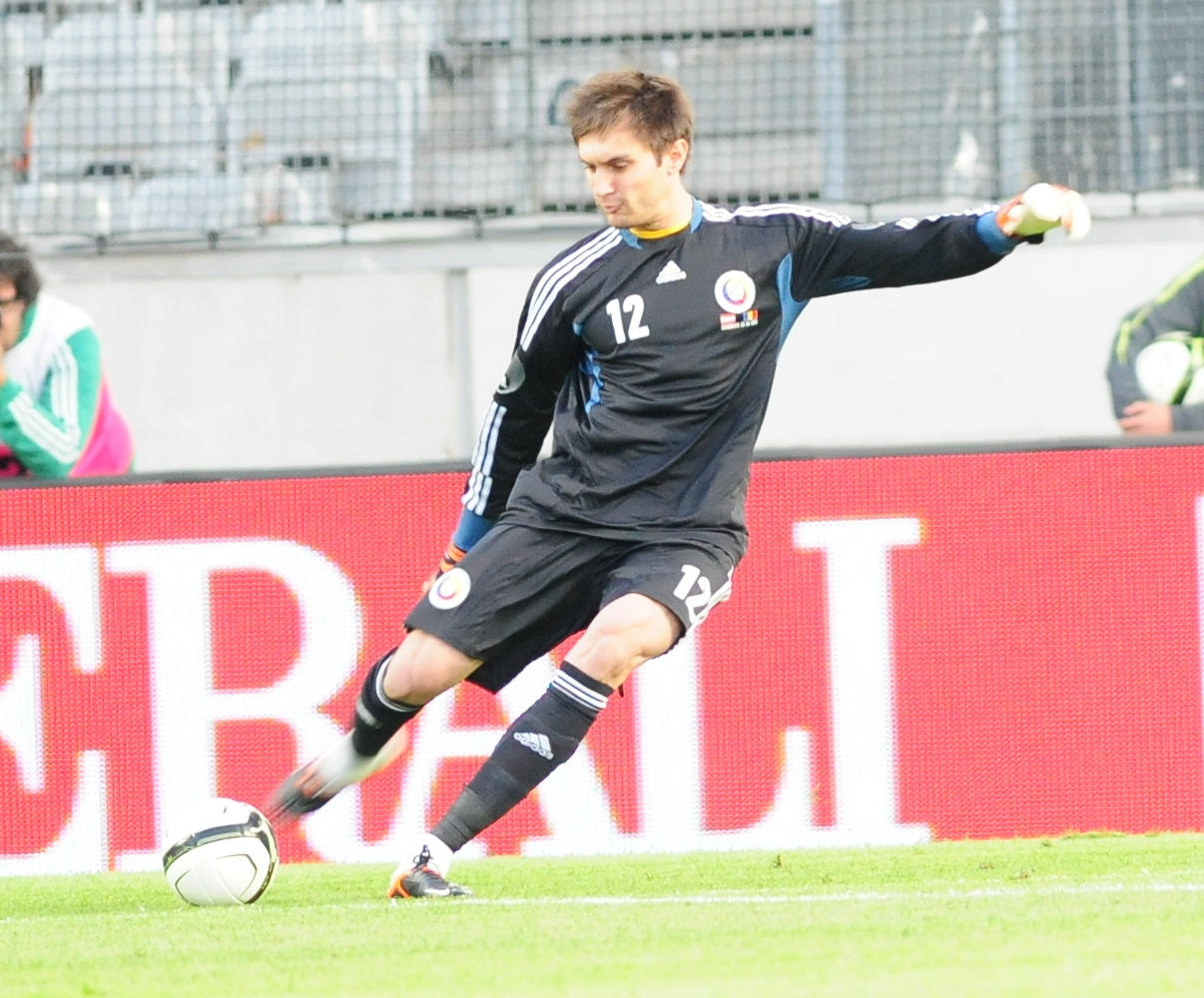
Tătărușanu taking a goal kick for Romania in June 2012

In August 2009, Tătărușanu was selected by manager Răzvan Lucescu in Romania's squad for a match with Hungary. His full international debut came on 17 November 2010, in a 1–1 draw against Italy. Tătărușanu became a bronze medalist at the Cyprus International Football Tournament in 2011.

He was picked for the preliminary 28-man UEFA Euro 2016 squad and eventually made it to the final list. He played in all three matches of the eventual group-stage exit, including the opener against hosts France.

On 19 November 2020, the day after earning his 73rd cap for the country in a 1–1 UEFA Nations League draw with Northern Ireland, Tătarușanu publicly announced his retirement from the national team.

== Career statistics ==
=== Club ===
Appearances and goals by club, season and competition
Club	Season	League			National cup (Note: Includes Cupa României, Coppa Italia, Coupe de France, King's Cup)		League cup (Note: Includes Coupe de la Ligue)		Continental		Other		Total	
Club	Season	Division	Apps	Goals	Apps	Goals	Apps	Goals	Apps	Goals	Apps	Goals	Apps	Goals
Juventus București	2003–04	Divizia B	1	0	0	0	—		—		—		1	0
Juventus București	2004–05	Divizia B	8	0	0	0	—		—		—		8	0
Juventus București	2005–06	Divizia B	20	0	0	0	—		—		—		20	0
Juventus București	2006–07	Liga III	?	?	1	0	—		—		—		1	0
Juventus București	Total		29	0	1	0	—		—		—		30	0
Gloria Bistrița	2006–07	Liga I	1	0	—		—		—		—		1	0
Gloria Bistrița	2007–08	Liga I	25	0	0	0	—		3 (Note: Appearances in UEFA Intertoto Cup)	0	—		28	0
Gloria Bistrița (loan)	2008–09	Liga I	19	0	1	0	—		—		—		20	0
Gloria Bistrița (loan)	Total		45	0	1	0	—		3	0	—		49	0
Steaua București	2009–10	Liga I	15	0	1	0	—		4 (Note: Appearances in UEFA Europa League)	0	—		20	0
Steaua București	2010–11	Liga I	34	0	5	0	—		8	0	—		47	0
Steaua București	2011–12	Liga I	28	0	0	0	—		7	0	1 (Note: Appearances in Supercupa României)	0	36	0
Steaua București	2012–13	Liga I	28	0	0	0	—		12	0	—		40	0
Steaua București	2013–14	Liga I	29	0	3	0	—		12 (Note: Appearances in UEFA Champions League)	0	1	0	45	0
Steaua București	Total		134	0	9	0	—		43	0	2	0	188	0
Fiorentina	2014–15	Serie A	9	0	2	0	—		7	0	—		18	0
Fiorentina	2015–16	Serie A	37	0	0	0	—		2	0	—		39	0
Fiorentina	2016–17	Serie A	35	0	2	0	—		7	0	—		44	0
Fiorentina	Total		81	0	4	0	—		16	0	—		101	0
Nantes	2017–18	Ligue 1	37	0	0	0	0	0	—		—		37	0
Nantes	2018–19	Ligue 1	27	0	2	0	1	0	—		—		30	0
Nantes	Total		64	0	2	0	1	0	—		—		67	0
Lyon	2019–20	Ligue 1	2	0	1	0	3	0	0	0	—		6	0
Lyon	2020–21	Ligue 1	0	0	—		—		—		—		0	0
Lyon	Total		2	0	1	0	3	0	—		—		6	0
AC Milan	2020–21	Serie A	1	0	2	0	—		2	0	—		5	0
AC Milan	2021–22	Serie A	6	0	0	0	—		3	0	—		9	0
AC Milan	2022–23	Serie A	16	0	1	0	—		5	0	1 (Note: Appearance in Supercoppa Italiana)	0	23	0
AC Milan	Total		23	0	3	0	—		10	0	1	0	37	0
Abha	2023–24	Saudi Pro League	33	0	3	0	—		—		—		36	0
Career total			411	0	24	0	4	0	72	0	3	0	515	0

=== International ===
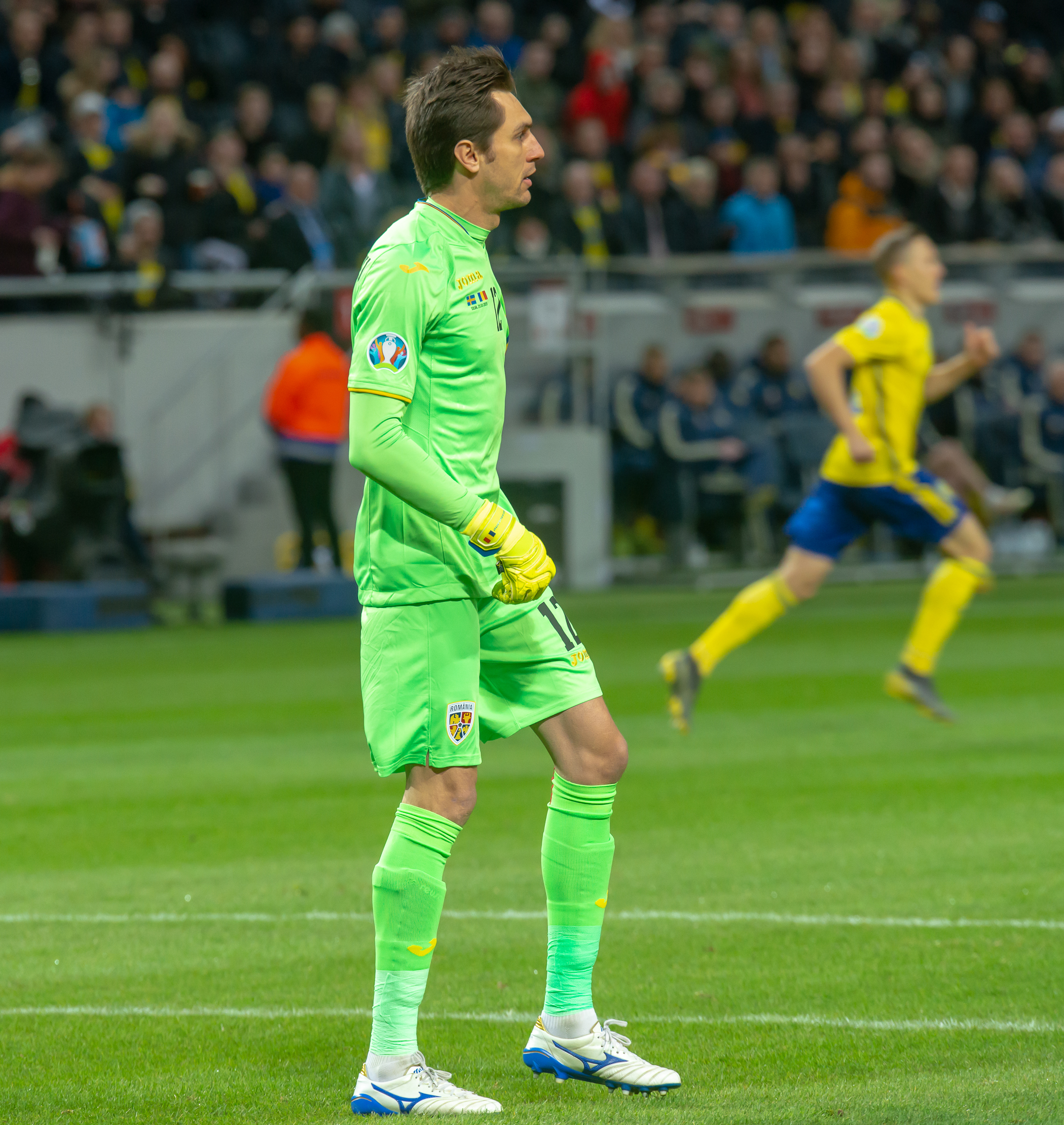
Tătărușanu playing for Romania against Sweden in March 2019

National team	Year	Apps	Goals
Romania	2010	1	0
Romania	2011	8	0
Romania	2012	7	0
Romania	2013	6	0
Romania	2014	6	0
Romania	2015	6	0
Romania	2016	9	0
Romania	2017	6	0
Romania	2018	9	0
Romania	2019	10	0
Romania	2020	6	0
Total		74	0

== Honours ==
Steaua București

- Liga I: 2012–13, 2013–14
- Cupa României: 2010–11
- Supercupa României: 2013

Lyon

- Coupe de la Ligue runner-up: 2019–20

AC Milan

- Serie A: 2021–22
- Supercoppa Italiana runner-up: 2022

Individual

- Romanian Footballer of the Year: 2015; runner-up: 2017
