= Juan Toja =

Colombian footballer (born 1985)

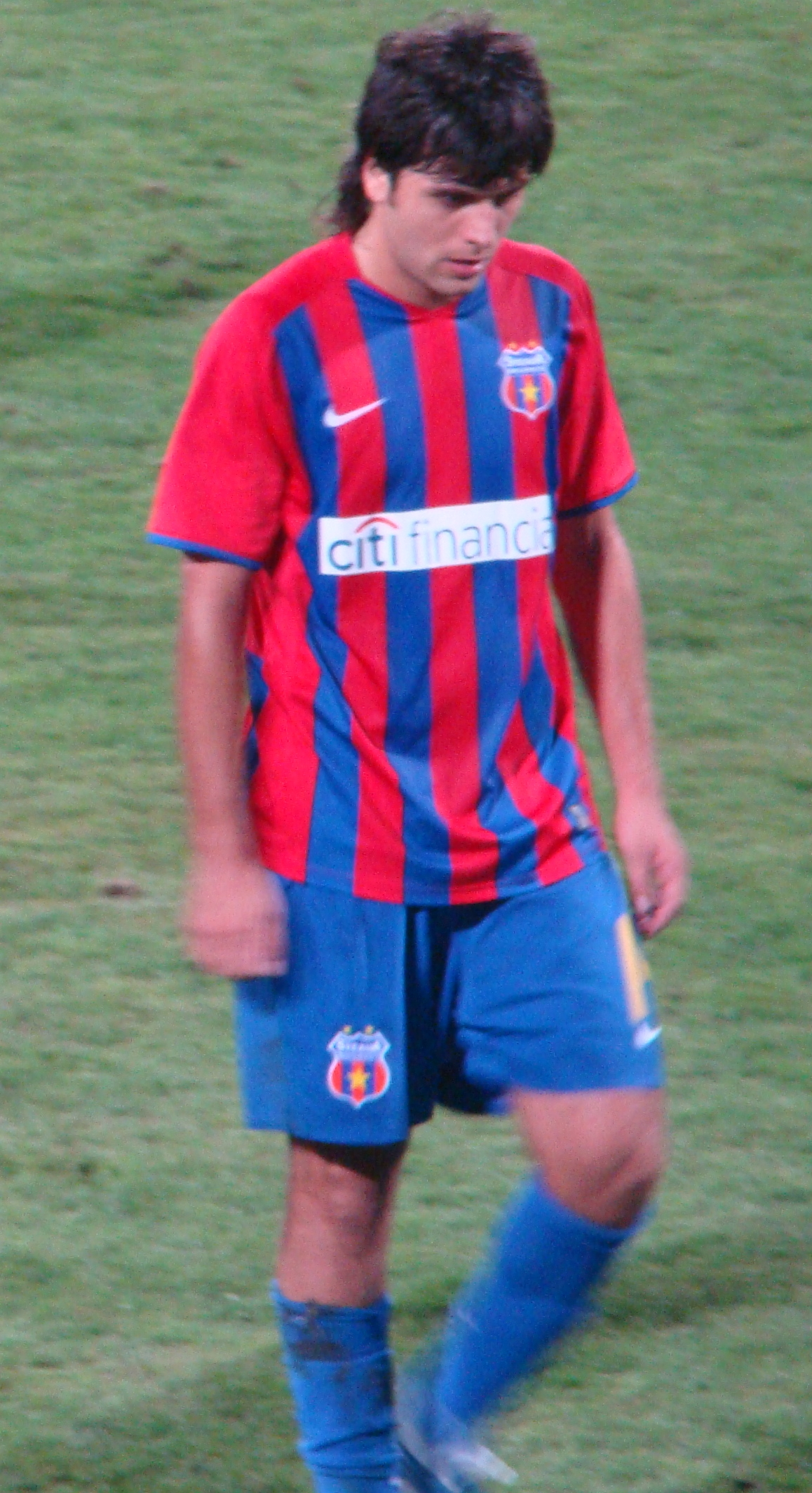
- Toja playing for Steaua

Personal information
- Full name: Juan Carlos Toja Vega
- Date of birth: 24 May 1985 (age 41)
- Place of birth: Bogotá, Colombia
- Height: 1.85 m (6 ft 1 in)
- Position: Attacking midfielder

Youth career
- 1995–2003: Santa Fe

Senior career*
| Years | Team | Apps | (Gls) |
| 2003–2007 | Santa Fe | 25 | (3) |
| 2005–2006 | → River Plate (loan) | 3 | (1) |
| 2007–2008 | FC Dallas | 43 | (8) |
| 2008–2010 | Steaua București | 51 | (3) |
| 2010–2012 | Aris | 37 | (1) |
| 2012–2013 | New England Revolution | 23 | (1) |
| Total | | 182 | (17) |

International career^{‡}
| 2004–2005 | Colombia U20 | 15 | (3) |
| 2008–2009 | Colombia | 3 | (0) |
- * Club domestic league appearances and goals as of 1 November 2013 ‡ National team caps and goals as of 12 February 2009

Juan Carlos Toja Vega (born 24 May 1985) is a former Colombian footballer.

== Club career ==
=== Colombia ===
Toja started his soccer career in Colombian tournament Interclubes (played amongst select country clubs) in the Clan MacGregor team, playing alongside retired professional player Lucas Jaramillo. Joined Colombian Santa Fe at age 16, playing for the club's U-19 team for six months, was promoted to the first team in early 2004, where he played 25 games in the next two seasons.

=== Argentina ===
Toja signed with Argentine club River Plate following the tournament but struggled to break into the first team. He played 5 games in the Copa Libertadores Tournament for River Plate, scoring once. He played in only three Torneo Verano games while loaned to River Plate from Santa Fe in 2006.

=== United States ===
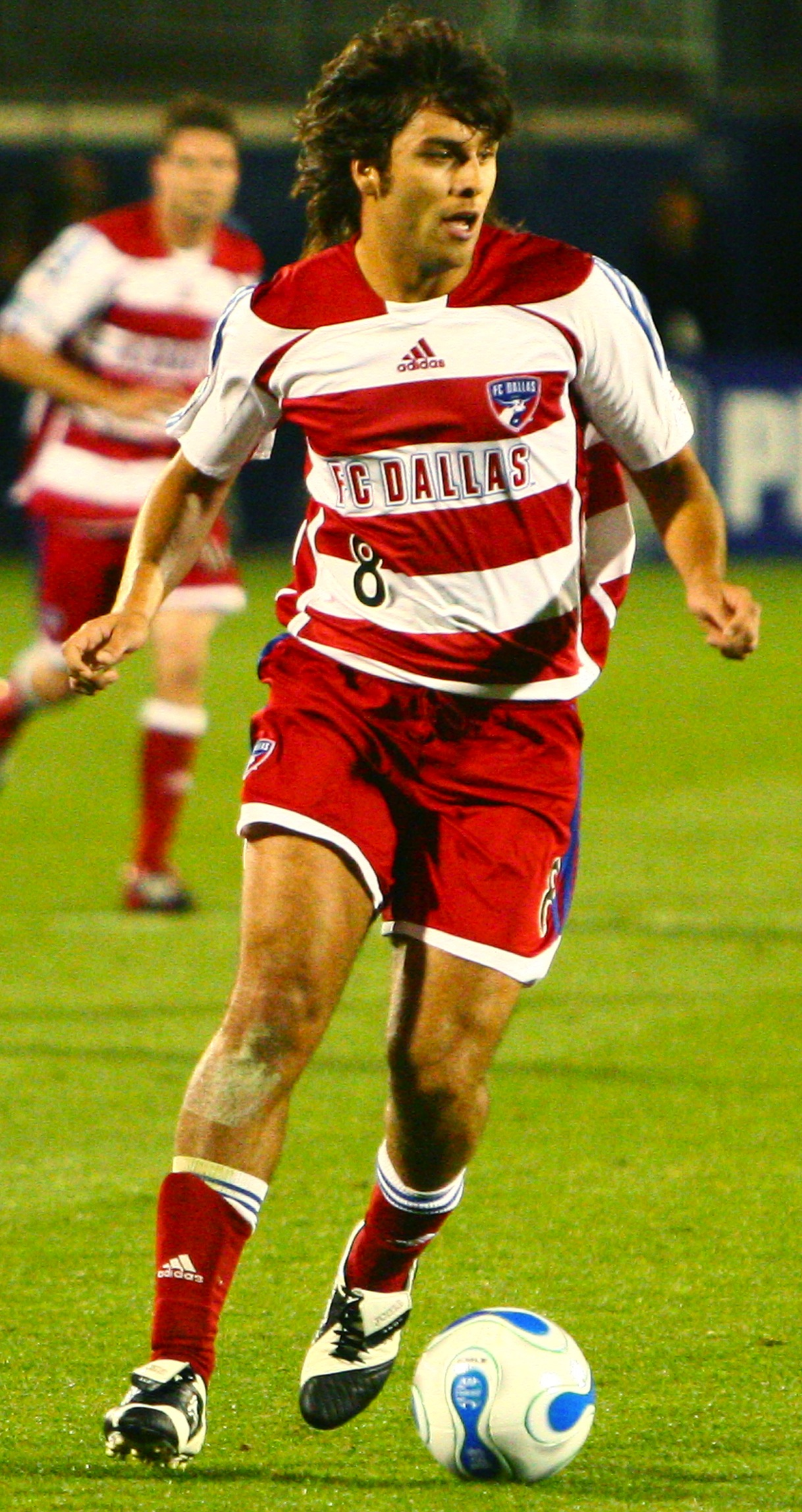
Juan Toja with FC Dallas

In February 2007, after sending a highlight video to FC Dallas and impressing in a tryout held at FC Dallas pre-season camp in Brazil, Toja was signed with Major League Soccer on a loan from Independiente Santa Fe. With his electric play and flashy style (topped off with an impressive hairdo – an homage to Jim Morrison, the late lead singer of The Doors), Toja quickly became a fan favorite in Dallas. He scored his first MLS goal, the game-winner, in a 2–1 win at Kansas City Wizards on 5/12, and tallied another game-winner in a 2–1 win at Chicago Fire on 5/17.

He scored his fourth goal in a 1–0 victory at Colorado Rapids on 6/23, his team-leading third game-winner. He scored two in a historic comeback at D.C. United on 7/14 and earned the Week 15 MLS Player of the Week honors for his effort. He was named to the Major League Soccer All-Star Game, starting and scoring the second goal of the MLS team's 2–0 win over Celtic F.C. on 7/19 in Colorado.

Toja started all three SuperLiga matches and tallied a goal and an assist. He left the U.S. Open Cup quarterfinal game vs. Charleston at halftime on 8/7 with a sprained ankle, which kept him out for the next two regular season games. Missed 9/15 game at New England Revolution due to sprained right ankle. Returned to play full 90 minutes on 9/20 in 1–1 tie with Chicago Fire. Started 27 regular season games, finishing second on the team with 6 goals. Appeared in all 4 U.S. Open Cup games and all 3 SuperLiga games, scoring once vs. Los Angeles Galaxy on 7/31 in SuperLiga match. His 34 appearances in all competitions tied for second on the team with Arturo Alvarez and Drew Moor.

His production fell after the 2007 All-Star Game as he received an ankle injury and struggled to find consistency. The season was considered a success and FC Dallas purchased Toja's contract from Independiente Santa Fe.

His performances remained at a high standard in the 2008 season with FC Dallas, scoring 2 goals and being named to the 2008 All-Star Game, but he left the US shortly after the All-Star Game to follow his 'dream' to play in Europe for Romanian giants Steaua București. As a testament to the quality and effort Toja put into his performances the FC Dallas faithful would wear wigs in celebration of his trademark 'rock and roll' mullet.

=== Romania ===
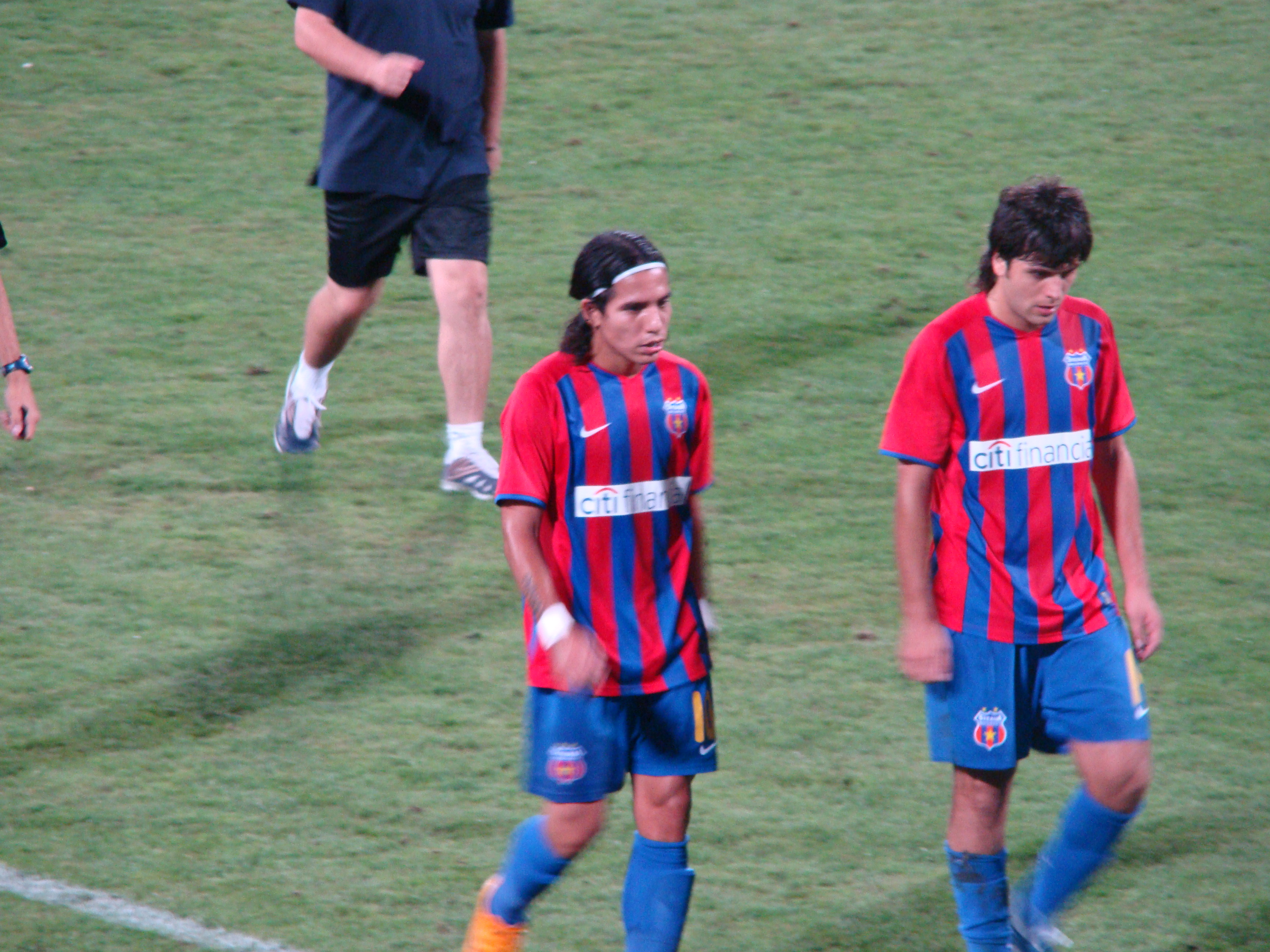
Juan Toja (right) alongside team-mate and fellow countryman Dayro Moreno during half-time in a match between Steaua București and Pandurii.

On 1 August 2008, FC Dallas made Toja's transfer to Romanian side Steaua București official. He was thus the first player to move from the United States to a Romanian club. Several days after his appearance at the Major League Soccer All-Star game against West Ham United, it had been speculated that Toja would move to Europe within a few days. He joined Colombian mates Dayro Moreno and Róbinson Zapata.

=== Greece ===
On 21 July 2010, Toja was transferred to Aris, signing a three-year contract. He made his debut in the UEFA Europa League against Jagiellonia Białystok. He scored his first goal for Aris against Olympiacos in Kleanthis Vikelidis (2011–2012).

=== New England Revolution ===
On 23 August 2012, Toja was acquired by the New England Revolution of Major League Soccer through the league's Allocation process. He arrived in the United States on 9 September, and trained with the Revolution for the first time on the next day. Despite battling knee stiffness, he made his Revolution debut in a substitute appearance against D.C. United on 15 September, which was his first MLS action since 19 July 2008 when he was with FC Dallas. On 26 June 2013, Toja made his first goal in a Revolution uniform in the Lamar Hunt US Open Cup against the D.C. United from a curving free kick in top left corner. Toja scored his first domestic league goal for the club on 17 July 2013 against the Colorado Rapids on a free kick with a soft touch in the lower left corner.

== Colombia National Team ==
He played with the Colombian U-20 national team at the 2005 South American Youth Championship, which Colombia hosted and won. Toja then competed at the 2005 FIFA World Youth Championship in the Netherlands, helping Colombia to the Round of 16 before losing to eventual champion Argentina. Toja appeared in three of the team's four games, once as a substitute, including a start against Argentina. He was called up to the full Colombian national team in October 2008 and started in his first game versus Brazil on 15 October 2008 for a 2010 World Cup Qualifier.

== Personal life ==
His family sustained a tragedy when brother Sebastian, one year younger, was involved in an accident that claimed his life when Juan was 14 years old. He is a fan of a variety of music, including rock with his favorite performers being The Rolling Stones, The Doors, Led Zeppelin, The Police and Soda Stereo also likes salsa music. His grandfather on his dad's side, also named Juan Carlos Toja, was born in Uruguay and played professional football in his country for C.A. Peñarol; he later moved to Colombia and played for Independiente Medellín and Cucuta Deportivo. His grandfather on mother's side, Victor Vega, is Colombian and played professionally for Santa Fe, Millonarios, and was a member of the Colombia National Team. He is of Spanish descent through his paternal great-grandfather.
