= Gora Tall =

Senegalese footballer

Personal information
- Full name: Gora Tall
- Date of birth: 20 May 1985 (age 41)
- Place of birth: Louga, Senegal
- Height: 1.90 m (6 ft 3 in)
- Position: Centre back

Team information
- Current team: Al-Shabab

Senior career*
Years	Team	Apps	(Gls)
2005–2006	ASEC Ndiambour		
2006–2007	Ashdod	28	(0)
2007–2009	Trofense	3	(0)
2008	→ Nelas (loan)	12	(2)
2008–2009	→ Gondomar (loan)	25	(1)
2009–2011	APOP Kinyras	41	(4)
2010	→ Steaua București (loan)	0	(0)
2010	→ Steaua B (loan)	4	(0)
2011–2013	AEP	41	(3)
2013–2015	Ethnikos Achna	60	(6)
2016–	Al-Shabab	?	(3)
- * Club domestic league appearances and goals as of 2 July 2017

Gora Tall (born 20 May 1985, in Louga) is a Senegalese professional footballer who plays as a central defender for Kuwaiti club Al-Shabab SC (Al Ahmadi).
