= Cezar Lungu =

Romanian footballer

Personal information
- Full name: Cezar Andrei Lungu
- Date of birth: 6 April 1988 (age 38)
- Place of birth: Târgoviște, Romania
- Height: 1.92 m (6 ft 4 in)
- Position: Goalkeeper

Team information
- Current team: Chindia Târgoviște (GK coach)

Youth career
- –2002: ProSport Târgoviște
- 2002–2005: Steaua București

Senior career*
Years	Team	Apps	(Gls)
2005–2010	Steaua II București	36	(0)
2010–2011	Steaua București	0	(0)
2011–2013	Astra Ploiești	3	(0)
2012	→ Sportul Studențesc (loan)	16	(0)
2012–2013	→ CSMS Iași (loan)	8	(0)
2014–2015	Academica Argeș	35	(0)
2015–2019	Dunărea Călărași	103	(0)
2019–2020	Petrolul Ploiești	21	(0)
2020–2021	Concordia Chiajna	3	(0)
2021–2022	FC Brașov	6	(0)
Total		231	(0)

International career
2004–2005	Romania U17	6	(0)
2007–2010	Romania U21	4	(0)

Managerial career
- 2024–2026: Chindia Târgoviște (GK coach)
- 2026–: Chindia Târgoviște (GK coach)
- * Club domestic league appearances and goals

Cezar Andrei Lungu (born 6 April 1988), is a former Romanian professional footballer who played as a goalkeeper, currently goalkeeping coach at Liga II club Chindia Târgoviște.

== Honours ==
Steaua București

- Cupa României: 2010–11

Dunărea Călărași

- Liga II: 2017–18
