= Ifeanyi Emeghara =

Nigerian footballer (born 1984)

Personal information
- Full name: Ifeanyi Innocenti Emeghara
- Date of birth: 24 March 1984 (age 42)
- Place of birth: Lagos, Nigeria
- Height: 1.73 m (5 ft 8 in)
- Position: Defender

Youth career
- Ebedei

Senior career*
Years	Team	Apps	(Gls)
2003–2004	Teleoptik		
2004–2005	Partizan	36	(0)
2006–2007	Politehnica Timișoara	42	(0)
2007–2011	Steaua București	42	(0)
2011	Steaua II București	2	(0)
2013	Gabala	4	(0)
Total		126	(0)

International career
2007–2008	Nigeria	3	(0)
- * Club domestic league appearances and goals

Ifeanyi Innocent Emeghara (born 24 March 1984) is a Nigerian former professional footballer who played as a defender. He was deployed equally on the left and the right flank.

== Club career ==
=== Partizan ===
After failing to find a club in Italy, Emeghara arrived to Partizan for a trial in January 2003, accompanied by compatriot Oladipupo Martins. They were both eventually assigned to affiliated club Teleoptik. After spending 18 months with the Optičari, Emeghara was promoted to the Partizan first team in June 2004, penning his first professional contract on a four-year deal. He was given the number 16 shirt, previously worn by fellow countryman Taribo West.

In his first season with the Crno-beli, Emeghara established himself as the team's first-choice left-back, making 39 appearances in all competitions, as Partizan won the league title with an unbeaten record and reached the knockout stage of the UEFA Cup. In January 2006, Emeghara was transferred to Romanian club Politehnica Timișoara on a three-year deal.

=== Steaua București ===
In June 2007, Emeghara moved to Steaua București for a reported transfer fee of €1.2 million. His time with the Roș-albaștrii was plagued with injuries, particularly to his knees, causing him to make only 58 competitive appearances over the course of five seasons. In February 2013, after being out of contract for a year, Emeghara signed with Azerbaijani side Gabala.

== International career ==
Emeghara made his international debut for Nigeria on 17 November 2007, playing the full 90 minutes in a 1–0 friendly loss against Australia. He was named in Berti Vogts' 23-man squad for the 2008 Africa Cup of Nations, remaining an unused substitute during the tournament.

== Career statistics ==
Appearances and goals by club, season and competition
Club	Season	League		Cup		Continental		Total	
Club	Season	Apps	Goals	Apps	Goals	Apps	Goals	Apps	Goals
Partizan	2004–05	24	0	4	0	11	0	39	0
Partizan	2005–06	12	0	1	0	4	0	17	0
Partizan	Total	36	0	5	0	15	0	56	0
Politehnica Timișoara	2005–06	14	0	0	0	—		14	0
Politehnica Timișoara	2006–07	28	0	3	0	—		31	0
Politehnica Timișoara	Total	42	0	3	0	—		45	0
Steaua București	2007–08	12	0	2	0	5	0	19	0
Steaua București	2008–09	0	0	0	0	0	0	0	0
Steaua București	2009–10	11	0	0	0	1	0	12	0
Steaua București	2010–11	11	0	2	0	3	0	16	0
Steaua București	2011–12	8	0	1	0	2	0	11	0
Steaua București	Total	42	0	5	0	11	0	58	0
Steaua II București	2010–11	2	0	—		—		2	0
Gabala	2012–13	4	0	0	0	—		4	0
Career total		126	0	13	0	26	0	165	0

== Honours ==
Partizan

- First League of Serbia and Montenegro: 2004–05

Steaua București

- Cupa României: 2010–11
