= Mihai Onicaș =

Romanian footballer

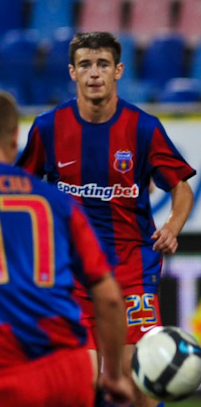

Personal information
- Full name: Mihai Marian Onicaș
- Date of birth: 27 January 1990 (age 36)
- Place of birth: Cluj-Napoca, Romania
- Height: 1.81 m (5 ft 11 in)
- Position: Defensive midfielder

Team information
- Current team: Vulturul Mintiu Gherlii

Youth career
- 2005–2006: Universitatea Cluj
- 2006: Steaua II București

Senior career*
Years	Team	Apps	(Gls)
2007–2014	Steaua București	9	(0)
2007–2008	→ Mureșul Deva (loan)	20	(1)
2010	→ Politehnica Iași (loan)	10	(0)
2010	→ Târgu Mureș (loan)	11	(0)
2011	→ Unirea Urziceni (loan)	8	(0)
2011–2013	→ Viitorul Constanța (loan)	38	(2)
2013–2014	→ Târgu Mureș (loan)	20	(0)
2014–2015	Olimpia Satu Mare	17	(2)
2015	Speranța Nisporeni	9	(1)
2016–2017	Olimpia Satu Mare	40	(7)
2017–2018	Universitatea Cluj	18	(2)
2018	Sticla Arieșul Turda	4	(0)
2019–2020	Unirea Dej	27	(6)
2020–2022	SCM Zalău	45	(7)
2022–2023	Minerul Ocna Dej	21	(0)
2024–	Vulturul Mintiu Gherlii	0	(0)

International career^{‡}
2007–2009	Romania U-17	3	(0)
2009	Romania U-19	3	(0)
2009–2010	Romania U-21	4	(0)
- * Club domestic league appearances and goals as of 20:55, 13 January 2024 (UTC) ‡ National team caps and goals as of 29 May 2010

Mihai Marian Onicaș (born 27 January 1990) is a Romanian footballer who plays as a defensive midfielder for Liga IV side Vulturul Mintiu Gherlii.

== Club career ==
On 10 June 2009 played his first match in Liga I for Steaua București against Unirea Urziceni. Later that year, on 16 July, Onicas made his European Cup debut in the 2–0 victory for Steaua in the UEFA Europa League against Újpest FC.

On 2 February 2010 he was loaned for six months to fellow Liga I team Politehnica Iași so that he would get more playing time.

In June 2011, after not making a breakthrough at Steaua, Onicaș signed for Viitorul Constanța. After just a year, he helped the team gain promotion to the Liga I.

== International career ==
On 12 August 2009 he made his debut for Romania U-21 against Andorra U-21, Romania won with 2–0.
