= Tininho (Portuguese footballer) =

Mozambican-Portuguese footballer

Personal information
- Full name: Miguel Ângelo Karim Simões Fazenda
- Date of birth: 13 October 1980 (age 46)
- Place of birth: Beira, Mozambique
- Height: 1.78 m (5 ft 10 in)
- Position: Left back

Youth career
- 1993–1994: Mem Martins
- 1994–1999: Estrela Amadora

Senior career*
Years	Team	Apps	(Gls)
1999–2000	Torreense	24	(0)
2000–2001	Damaiense		
2001–2004	Micaelense	76	(4)
2004–2007	Beira-Mar	90	(2)
2007–2008	West Bromwich Albion	1	(0)
2008	→ Barnsley (loan)	3	(0)
2008–2009	Belenenses	13	(0)
2009	Steaua București	0	(0)
2009	Steaua II	4	(0)
2010–2011	Leixões	14	(0)
2012	Portimonense	8	(0)
2012–2013	Atlético	34	(1)
2015–2016	Pinhalnovense	3	(0)
Total		270	(7)
- * Club domestic league appearances and goals

Miguel Ângelo Karim Simões Fazenda (born 13 October 1980), known as Tininho, is a Portuguese retired professional footballer who played as a left back.

== Football career ==
=== Early career ===
Born in Beira, Mozambique, Tininho spent his first five years as a senior playing in the lower leagues of Portugal (third or fourth tiers). In summer 2004 he signed with S.C. Beira-Mar of the Primeira Liga, suffering relegation in his first season but achieving promotion in his second, as champions.

In the 2006–07 campaign, Tininho appeared in every single league match and totalled 2,544 minutes of play, but the Aveiro side were immediately relegated back to the Segunda Liga.

=== England ===
In late July 2007, Tininho signed for English club West Bromwich Albion on a two-year deal worth £230,000, after a successful trial. He made his competitive debut on 11 August in a 1–2 defeat at Burnley, on the opening day of the season. However, he did not play another league game for Albion and, in January 2008 was loaned to fellow Championship side Barnsley for a month, in order to "acclimatise to this league".

On 11 August 2008, Tininho was released from his WBA contract with a view to him returning to Portugal, with Leixões SC. However, nothing came of it, and he eventually joined C.F. Os Belenenses also in the top division in mid-December; the Lisbon team eventually finished second from bottom, being later reinstated after C.F. Estrela da Amadora's demotion due to financial irregularities.

=== Later years ===
On 23 July 2009, Tininho signed for FC Steaua București from Romania on a free transfer, agreeing on a one-year contract with an option for a further two seasons. He only played one competitive match during his tenure, against St Patrick's Athletic for the season's UEFA Europa League (four minutes in a 3–0 home win for the last playoff round), being mostly associated with the reserves in the Liga II.

On 6 October 2009, Tininho terminated his contract with Steaua. After several months without a club, he finally joined Leixões for 2010–11's second level.
