= Ibón Arrieta =

Spanish footballer

Personal information
- Full name: Ibón Pérez Arrieta
- Date of birth: 9 June 1977 (age 49)
- Place of birth: San Sebastián, Spain
- Height: 1.78 m (5 ft 10 in)
- Position: Striker

Youth career
- Touring

Senior career*
Years	Team	Apps	(Gls)
1997–1998	Touring		
1999	Real Sociedad B	0	(0)
1999–2000	Pollença	34	(19)
2000–2001	Talavera	33	(9)
2001–2002	Chaves	25	(18)
2002–2003	Braga	31	(4)
2003–2004	Chaves	30	(17)
2004–2005	Estoril	21	(7)
2005	Racing Ferrol	7	(0)
2006	Logroñés	13	(1)
2006	Maccabi Herzliya	12	(3)
2007	PAS Giannina		
2007	Melilla	11	(1)
2007	Swindon Town	4	(0)
2008–2010	Pandurii	27	(3)
2011–2013	El Palo	50	(19)
2013	Oiartzun		
2013–2014	Alhaurín Torre	20	(7)
2014–2017	Juventud Torremolinos	78	(59)
2017	El Palo	5	(0)
2017–2018	Juventud Torremolinos	27	(12)
Total		428	(179)

Managerial career
- 2018–2020: Juventud Torremolinos
- 2021–2023: Juventud Torremolinos
- 2024–2025: Rincón
- 2026: Marbellí
- * Club domestic league appearances and goals

Ibón Pérez Arrieta (born 9 June 1977) is a Spanish former professional footballer who played as a striker. He is currently a manager.

A journeyman, he played for 18 clubs in six countries.

== Club career ==
Arrieta was born in San Sebastián, Gipuzkoa. In his country, he could never play in higher than the Segunda División B in his beginnings, moving in 2001 to Iberian Peninsula neighbours Portugal with G.D. Chaves where he scored at a high rate, always in the Segunda Liga. He had also spells in the country's Primeira Liga, with S.C. Braga and G.D. Estoril Praia.

Arrieta returned in 2005 to his homeland, joining Segunda División side Racing de Ferrol, but again had no luck, appearing in less than one quarter of the season's matches as his team was also relegated. He then played in quick succession for CD Logroñés, Maccabi Herzliya FC, PAS Giannina FC and UD Melilla.

In the summer of 2007, following a successful trial which included a preseason mini-tour of Austria, Arrieta agreed to a two-year deal at Football League One club Swindon Town. He made his official debut as a second-half substitute on the opening day draw at Northampton Town, and scored his only goal in the Football League Trophy against Brentford, executing an overhead kick in a 4–1 win.

In January 2008, however, Arrieta left Swindon and signed a contract with Romania's CS Pandurii Târgu Jiu, leaving after two and a half seasons as a free agent with a maximum of ten Liga I games played (in 2009–10). He continued to compete in Spanish amateur football well into his 40s, mainly in representation of Juventud de Torremolinos CF where he later worked as manager and director of football.

== Career statistics ==
Year	Club	Country	League	Appearances	Goals
1999–2000	Pollença	Spain	Tercera División	34	19
2000–01	Talavera	Spain	Segunda División B	33	9
2001–02	Chaves	Portugal	Segunda Liga	25	18
2002–03	Braga	Portugal	Primeira Liga	31	4
2003–04	Chaves	Portugal	Segunda Liga	30	17
2004–05	Estoril	Portugal	Primeira Liga	21	7
2005	Racing Ferrol	Spain	Segunda División	7	0
2006	Logroñés	Spain	Segunda División B	13	1
2006	Maccabi Herzliya	Israel	Israeli Premier League	12	3
2007	PAS Giannina	Greece	Football League	–	–
2007	Melilla	Spain	Segunda División B	11	1
2007	Swindon Town	England	Football League One	4	0
2008	Pandurii	Romania	Liga I	9	3
2008–09	Pandurii	Romania	Liga I	8	0
2009–10	Pandurii	Romania	Liga I	10	0
Total				193	56
