= Răzvan Ochiroșii =

Romanian footballer (born 1989)

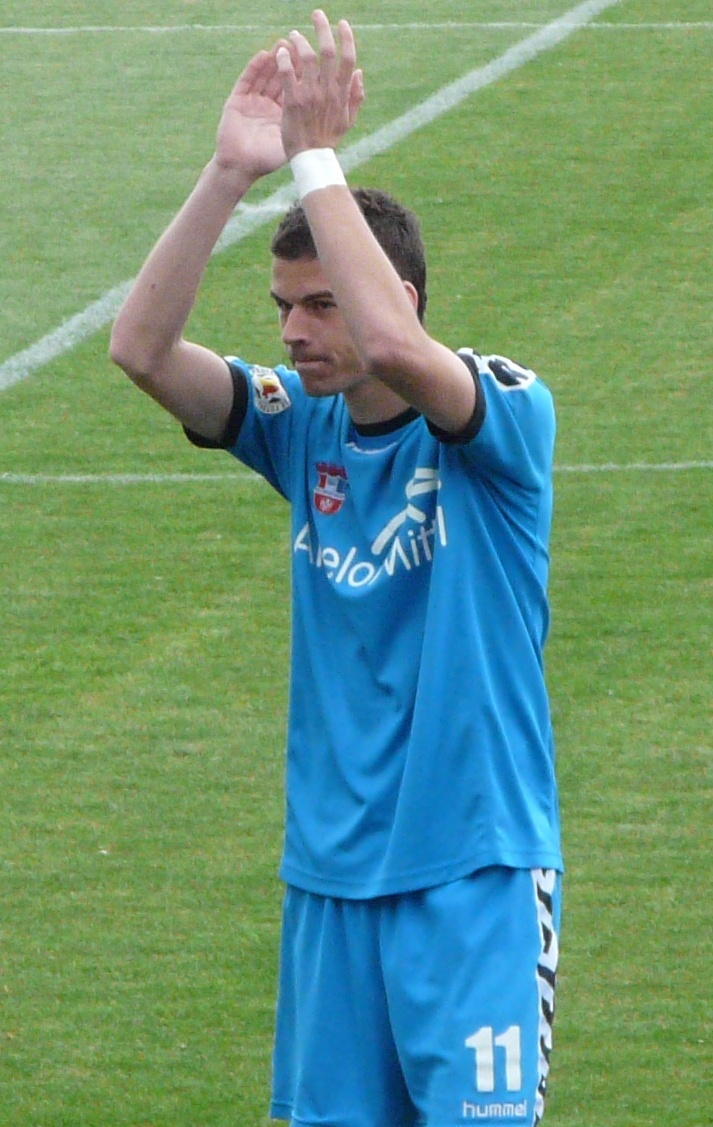
- Ochiroșii in 2010

Personal information
- Full name: Răzvan Iulian Ochiroșii
- Date of birth: 13 March 1989 (age 37)
- Place of birth: Galați, Romania
- Height: 1.78 m (5 ft 10 in)
- Positions: Left-back; left winger

Team information
- Current team: Cristo Atlético
- Number: 3

Youth career
- Steaua Dunării Galați
- –2006: Steaua București

Senior career*
Years	Team	Apps	(Gls)
2006–2009	Steaua București	27	(2)
2007	→ Gloria Buzău (loan)	3	(0)
2010–2013	Oțelul Galați	31	(2)
2011	→ Săgeata Năvodari (loan)	14	(1)
2012	→ Prahova Tomșani (loan)		
2012–2013	→ Fuenlabrada (loan)	18	(0)
2013–2015	Guijuelo	60	(3)
2015–2017	Alcorcón	33	(1)
2017–2018	Marbella	18	(0)
2018–2021	Guijuelo	61	(0)
2018	→ Unionistas (loan)	11	(0)
2021–2022	Montijo	30	(5)
2022	Xerez Deportivo	9	(0)
2023	Tarazona	12	(1)
2023–2025	Don Benito	46	(0)
2025–2026	Santa Marta	30	(2)
2026–	Cristo Atlético	2	(0)

International career
2006–2007	Romania U17	6	(1)
2007	Romania U19	3	(1)
2007–2009	Romania U21	12	(1)
- * Club domestic league appearances and goals as of 12 September 2026

Răzvan Iulian Ochiroșii (born 13 March 1989) is a Romanian professional footballer who plays as a left-back or a left winger for Tercera Federación club Cristo Atlético.

== Club career ==
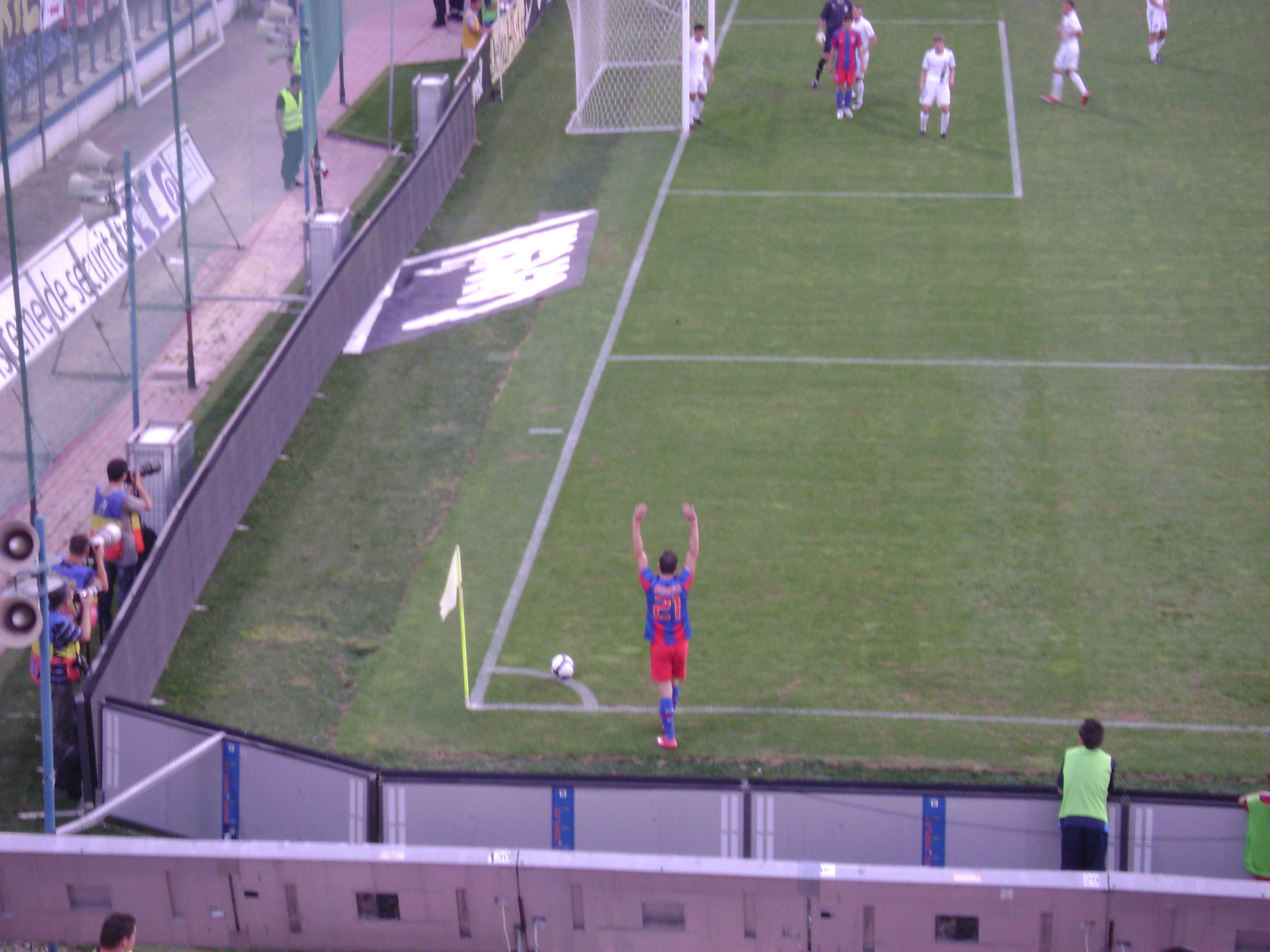
Ochiroșii executes a corner kick

Ochiroșii was born in Galați. After successfully graduating from Steaua Dunării Galați's Youth Academy, he signed a professional contract with Steaua București and made his debut in Liga I in May 2005 against FCM Bacău. He scored his first goal as a senior player on 2 August 2006, netting the last from a penalty kick in a 3–0 UEFA Champions League home win against ND Gorica, becoming Steaua's youngest scorer in a European competition at only 17 years, 4 months and 20 days.

Ochiroșii was loaned to Gloria Buzău in 2007, but was sparingly used after his return. On 5 January 2010, it was announced that 50% of his federative rights were given to Oțelul Galați, with Bulgarian defender Zhivko Zhelev moving in the opposite direction.

Ochiroșii was subsequently loaned to Săgeata Năvodari, Prahova Tomșani and Spanish sides CF Fuenlabrada and CD Guijuelo, the last two in Segunda División B. With the latter he appeared in 30 matches during the 2013–14 campaign, and signed a permanent two-year deal on 11 June 2014.

On 13 June 2015, Ochiroșii signed for AD Alcorcón in Segunda División, along with Guijuelo teammate Marc Nierga. On 20 July 2017, he moved to Marbella FC in the third division, after cutting ties with the Alfareros.

Ochiroșii resumed his career in the lower leagues, representing Unionistas de Salamanca CF and Guijuelo.

== Honours ==
Steaua București

- Divizia A: 2005–06
- Supercupa României: 2006

Oțelul Galați

- Liga I: 2010–11

Unionistas de Salamanca

- Tercera División: 2017–18

Don Benito

- Tercera Federación: 2023–24
