= Róbinson Zapata =

Colombian footballer (born 1978)

Robinson Zapata
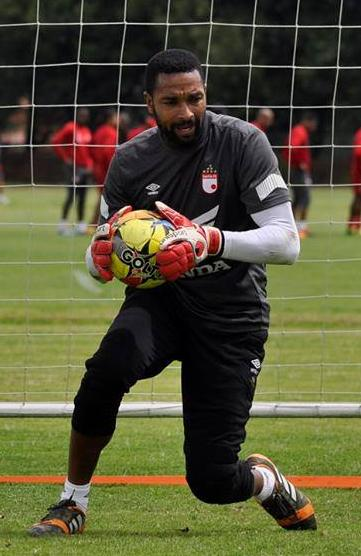

Personal information
- Full name: Róbinson Zapata Montaño
- Date of birth: 30 September 1978 (age 48)
- Place of birth: Florida, Colombia
- Height: 1.80 m (5 ft 11 in)
- Position: Goalkeeper

Team information
- Current team: Santa Fe (goalkeeper coach)

Senior career*
Years	Team	Apps	(Gls)
1998–2000	América de Cali	62	(0)
2000–2002	Real Cartagena	83	(7)
2003–2004	América de Cali	33	(0)
2004–2005	Rosario Central	1	(0)
2005	Independiente	0	(0)
2005–2006	Belgrano	25	(0)
2006–2007	Cúcuta Deportivo	44	(0)
2007–2011	Steaua București	85	(0)
2011	Galatasaray	10	(0)
2011–2012	Deportivo Pereira	18	(0)
2012–2013	Itagüí	43	(0)
2013–2014	Millonarios	11	(0)
2014–2018	Santa Fe	79	(1)
2020	Jaguares de Córdoba	20	(0)
Total		514	(8)

International career
	Colombia U21	13	(0)
2007–2016	Colombia	4	(0)

Managerial career
- 2025: Santa Fe (caretaker)
Medal record
Colombia
Copa América Centenario
Bronze medal – third place	2016 United States
- * Club domestic league appearances and goals

Róbinson Zapata Montaño (born 30 September 1978) is a Colombian former professional footballer who played as a goalkeeper. He is a goalkeeper coach for Colombian club Independiente Santa Fe.

== Club career ==
=== Colombia ===
Zapata started his career in Colombia with América de Cali and Real Cartagena. In 2004, he moved to Argentina where he had spells with Rosario Central, Independiente and Belgrano. In 2006, he joined La Serena in Chile before returning to Colombia to play for Cúcuta Deportivo.

=== Steaua București ===
Rufay, as he is called by his colleagues, joined Steaua on 23 July 2007 Steaua București for €500.000 and signed a four-year contract with the Romanian team from Cúcuta Deportivo. During the first half of the season, he became the most appreciated player in the Romanian team. (seen in this statistic made by Steaua supporters). After a mediocre second year at Steaua București, Rufay became the first option as a goalkeeper after Ciprian Tătăruşanu's mistakes, and showed outstanding form.

In the beginning of 2010–11 season, Rufay was demoted to the B squad after the arrival of new coach Victor Piţurcă. Soon after Piţurcă left the club, new coach Ilie Dumitrescu called him back to the first squad. In December 2010, Zapata ended the contract with Steaua București.

=== Galatasaray ===
On 21 January 2011, Zapata agreed a one-and-a-half-year deal with Turkish club Galatasaray. He has been in a bad shape since his arrival, with just two clean sheets in 13 games, with a shot/save ratio of 42%. In June 2011, Zapata was fired from Galatasaray, becoming a free agent. He returned to Colombia where he played for Deportivo Pereira in the second half of 2011.

== International career ==
On 5 July 2007, Zapata represented Colombia at the 2007 Copa América, playing against USA, but he was sent off in the 86th minute after being cautioned twice. His next tournament call-up came nine years later, ahead of the Copa América Centenario.

== Honours ==
América de Cali

- Categoría Primera A: 2000

Cúcuta Deportivo

- Categoría Primera A: 2006–II

Santa Fe

- Categoría Primera A: 2014–II, 2016–II
- Copa Sudamericana: 2015
- Superliga Colombiana: 2015
- Suruga Bank Championship: 2016

Colombia

- Copa América third place: 2016
