= Viktor Špišić =

Croatian footballer

Personal information
- Full name: Viktor Špišić
- Date of birth: 8 June 1982 (age 44)
- Place of birth: Sisak, SFR Yugoslavia
- Height: 1.77 m (5 ft 10 in)
- Position: Midfielder

Senior career*
Years	Team	Apps	(Gls)
2000–2005	Segesta		
2005–2007	Beroe Stara Zagora	39	(5)
2007–2010	Lokomotiv Sofia	60	(9)
2010–2011	Karlovac	32	(3)
2012–2013	Lekenik	27	(8)
2013	Segesta	27	(5)
2013–2014	NK Savski Marof		
2014–2015	Segesta		
2015–2017	Ilzer SV	46	(7)
2017–2019	Mladost Petrinja		
- * Club domestic league appearances and goals as of 25 December 2022

Viktor Špišić (born 8 June 1982 in Sisak, SFR Yugoslavia) is a Croatian retired footballer, who played as a midfielder. His first club was Segesta Sisak. He played both as a defensive and attacking midfielder.

== Career ==
Špišić began his career in his hometown as player of HNK Segesta. Then he was transferred to Bulgarian side Beroe Stara Zagora. In early 2007, he signed for Sofia. He later had a spell in the Austrian fifth tier.
