= Rade Veljović =

Serbian footballer

Personal information
- Full name: Rade Veljović
- Date of birth: 9 August 1986 (age 40)
- Place of birth: Belgrade, SFR Yugoslavia
- Height: 1.85 m (6 ft 1 in)
- Position: Striker

Youth career
- Red Star Belgrade

Senior career*
Years	Team	Apps	(Gls)
2004–2006	Red Star Belgrade	0	(0)
2004–2006	→ Jedinstvo Ub (loan)	51	(7)
2006–2007	Napredak Kruševac	33	(12)
2007–2008	Voždovac	47	(22)
2009–2012	CFR Cluj	1	(0)
2009–2010	→ Unirea Alba Iulia (loan)	29	(5)
2010	→ Târgu Mureș (loan)	3	(0)
2011	→ Borac Banja Luka (loan)	13	(2)
2011–2012	→ Javor Ivanjica (loan)	27	(7)
2012–2013	Smederevo	22	(1)
2013–2014	Voždovac	16	(4)
2015	Radnik Surdulica	0	(0)
Total		242	(60)

International career
2008–2009	Serbia U21	8	(0)
- * Club domestic league appearances and goals

Rade Veljović (Serbian Cyrillic: Раде Вељовић; born 9 August 1986) is a Serbian former professional footballer who played as a striker.

== Club career ==
After coming through the youth system at Red Star Belgrade, Veljović played for Jedinstvo Ub (loan), Napredak Kruševac, and Voždovac, before transferring abroad and signing with Romanian side CFR Cluj in the 2009 winter transfer window. He later spent some time on loan at Unirea Alba Iulia, Târgu Mureș, and Borac Banja Luka. In the summer of 2011, Veljović returned to his homeland on loan to Javor Ivanjica. He also played for Smederevo, Voždovac (second spell), and Radnik Surdulica (no appearances), before retiring from the game.

== International career ==
Veljović was selected by Slobodan Krčmarević to represent Serbia at the 2009 UEFA European Under-21 Championship, but failed to make any appearance at the tournament. He previously earned eight caps for the under-21 team.

== Honours ==
Radnik Surdulica

- Serbian First League: 2014–15
