= Stelios Parpas =

Cypriot footballer (born 1984)

Personal information
- Full name: Stelios Parpas
- Date of birth: 25 July 1985 (age 41)
- Place of birth: Limassol, Cyprus
- Height: 1.84 m (6 ft 0 in)
- Position: Centre back

Team information
- Current team: Karmiotissa

Senior career*
Years	Team	Apps	(Gls)
2006–2008	Aris Limassol	86	(5)
2008–2013	AEL Limassol	52	(0)
2010	→ Steaua București (loan)	13	(0)
2014–2016	Enosis Neon Paralimniou	34	(0)
2016–2018	Alki Oroklini	32	(5)
2018	Othellos Athienou	4	(0)
2019	ASIL	14	(1)
2019–	Karmiotissa	20	(0)

International career^{‡}
2011–2016	Cyprus	3	(0)
- * Club domestic league appearances and goals as of 21 May 2020 ‡ National team caps and goals as of March 2014

Stelios Parpas (Greek: Στέλιος Πάρπας; born July 25, 1984, in Limassol) is a Cypriot defender who currently plays for Karmiotissa.

== Career ==
He performed very well defensively in the season 2008/2009. He played in fewer games in 2009/2010.

Steaua Bucharest

He was loaned to Romanian side Steaua Bucharest in the second half of the 2009–2010 season. He played 13 games as a starting player but Steaua failed to win the championship and his loan was not extended. He returned to AEL Limassol the next season.
