= János Székely =

Romanian footballer

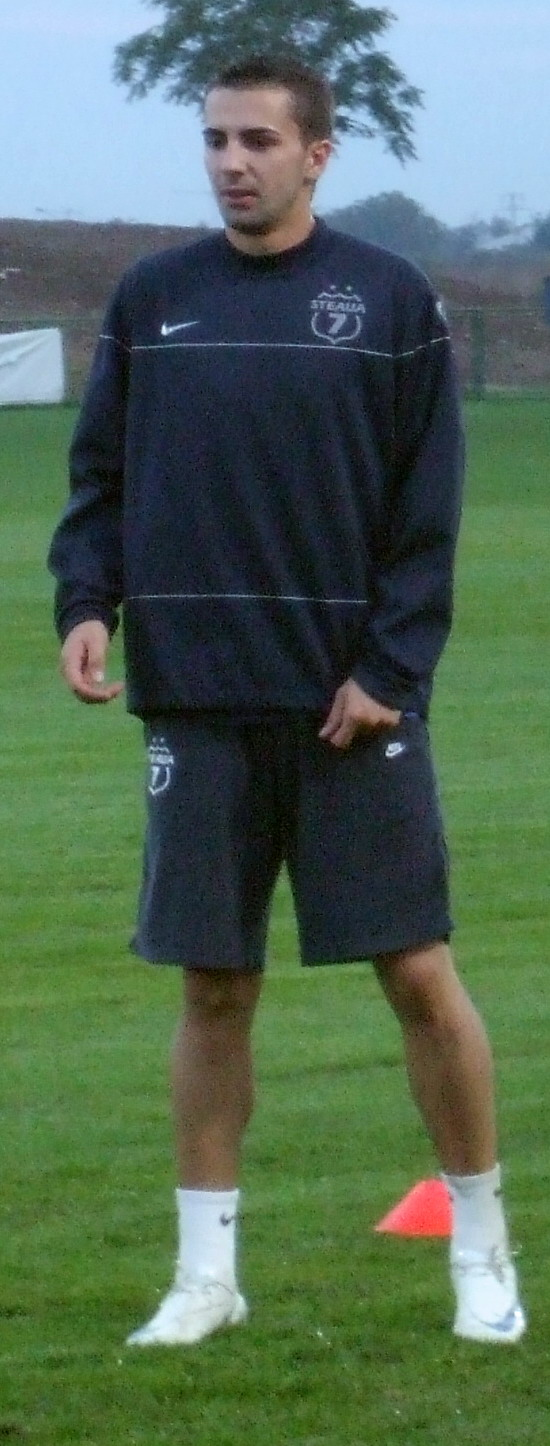
- Székely training at Steaua

Personal information
- Full name: János József Székely
- Date of birth: 13 May 1983 (age 43)
- Place of birth: Timișoara, Romania
- Height: 1.78 m (5 ft 10 in)
- Position: Winger

Team information
- Current team: Lecco U17 (head coach)

Youth career
- –2001: Politehnica Timișoara

Senior career*
Years	Team	Apps	(Gls)
2001–2003	Politehnica Timișoara	8	(0)
2003–2006	Universitatea Cluj	90	(22)
2007–2008	Oțelul Galați	41	(9)
2008–2011	Steaua București	48	(6)
2011–2012	Volga Nizhny Novgorod	7	(0)
2012	Korona Kielce	8	(1)
2013	Universitatea Cluj	8	(3)
2014	FC Brașov	8	(0)
2014–2015	ASA Târgu Mureș	7	(0)
2015–2017	Seregno	43	(6)
2017	Lecco	3	(0)
2018–2019	FBC Saronno		
Total		271	(47)

Managerial career
- 2021–2023: Seregno U18
- 2023–: Lecco U17
- * Club domestic league appearances and goals

János József Székely (born 13 May 1983) is a Romanian former professional footballer who played as a right winger.

== Career ==
Born in Timișoara of Hungarian heritage, he started his football career with local club Politehnica Timișoara, where he played 8 matches in Liga II between 2000 and 2002.

In 2003, he was bought by Universitatea Cluj for which he played 90 matches and managing to score 22 goals. After his good performance in Liga II Petre Grigoraş, coaching Oțelul Galați at that time, decided to transfer him. He debuted for Oțelul Galați in a cup match against Steaua. His first match in Liga I, in February 2007, was a victory against Unirea Urziceni.

=== Steaua București ===
On 6 May 2008 he signed a five-year contract with Steaua București, with a reported transfer fee of around €1.5 million and the midfielder would earn €200,000 per season.

On 23 July 2009 he scored the first goal of the second leg against Újpest FC, victory which enabled Steaua's qualification in the next round.

Szekely was released from Steaua in June 2011, and then signed a contract for two and a half years with Volga Nizhny Novgorod, in the Russian Premier League.

=== Korona Kielce ===
On 22 August 2012, Korona Kielce announced that Szekely would become a player for the Polish Ekstraklasa club. He signed a one-year contract.

== Honours ==
Oțelul Galați

- UEFA Intertoto Cup: 2007

Steaua București

- Cupa României: 2010–11
