= FCSB II =

Reserve team of FCSB

- Full name: SC Fotbal Club FCSB SA
- Short name: FCSB
- Founded: 1982 (as Steaua Mizil); 2004 (as Steaua II București)
- Ground: Baza Sportivă ARCOM
- Capacity: 1,000
- Owner: Gigi Becali
- Chairman: Valeriu Argăseală
- League: Liga III
- 2025–26: Liga III, Seria III 5th

Fotbal Club FCSB II (Romanian pronunciation: [fet͡ʃeseˌbe]), commonly known as FCSB II is a Romanian football club from Bucharest. The team was founded in 1982 as Steaua Mizil when Colonel Victor Stănculescu received an order from the Minister of Defense to establish a satellite team for Steaua Bucharest, dissolved in 1997 and refounded in 2004 and in 2016. It was the reserve team of FCSB.

== History ==
=== 1982–1997: Steaua Mizil ===
In 1982, when Colonel Victor Stănculescu received an order from the Minister of Defense to establish a satellite team for Steaua Bucharest. Tică Danilescu was chosen by Victor Stănculescu to be the creator and the man who will take care of the second team and the star academy. The conditions were extraordinary at Mizil. Rapid Mizil would merge with ICIM Ploiești, taking over from it players and the place in the third division, the 1982-83 edition, where it was active. At the end of the next edition of the championship, 1983-84, Steua Mizil promoted to Division B, after an extremely close match with Chimia Brazi. In the first edition, 1984-85, he participated under the name A.S. Mizil, which then changed and became the Steaua Mizil. This team had the same logo as the Steaua Bucharest club.

This club-satellite relationship meant that juniors from the teams of Steaua Bucharest arrived at Mizil year after year for the experience they could get from the tough competition of the Divizia B. At the end of the 1996-97 championship edition, the team was relegated to the third league and disbanding.

=== 2004–2023: FCSB II ===
The team was founded in 2004 under the name Steaua II București to train younger players. In 2009, it was promoted to Liga II and spent two seasons there, finishing 13th and 14th respectively, before being disbanded. It reappeared in 2016, and was admitted to Liga III to fill the places left unoccupied by the county champions who won the play-off matches and were unable to join the league. The team does not have the right to promotion.

== Stadium ==
Baza Sportivă ARCOM, also known as Baza Sportivă FCSB, is a sports complex in Bucharest, Romania. It is currently used only for football matches, is the home ground of FCSB II and FCSB Academy and also used by FCSB for trainings. The football complex was built by George Becali (owner of FCSB) on the place of the former ARCOM Concrete Plant, after his club was kicked out from Steaua Stadium and Ghencea Sports Complex due to the conflict with Ministry of National Defence and CSA Steaua București. The football complex has 4 grounds (3 with a grass pitch and 1 with an artificial turf) and holds 1,000 people.

== Honours ==
=== Leagues ===
- Liga III:
  - Winners (1): 1983–84, 2008–09
  - Runners-up (1): 2020–21

=== Other performances ===
- Appearances in Liga II: 15
- Best finish in Liga II: 2nd place in 1992–93

== League history ==
Season	Tier	Division	Place	Cupa României
2026–27	3	Liga III (Seria V)		
2025–26	3	Liga III (Seria III)	5th	
2023–25	Not active			
2022–23	3	Liga III (Seria IV)	9th (R)	
2021–22	3	Liga III (Seria IV)	5th	
2020–21	3	Liga III (Seria IV)	2nd	
2019–20	3	Liga III (Seria II)	15th	
2018–19	3	Liga III (Seria II)	11th	
2017–18	3	Liga III (Seria II)	6th	

Season	Tier	Division	Place	Cupa României
2016–17	3	Liga III (Seria III)	8th	
2011–16	Not active			
2010–11	2	Liga II (Seria I)	14th (R)	
2009–10	2	Liga II (Seria I)	13th	
2008–09	3	Liga III (Seria II)	1st (C, P)	
2007–08	3	Liga III (Seria II)	4th	
2006–07	3	Liga III (Seria II)	12th	
2005–06	3	Divizia C (Seria IV)	6th	
2004–05	3	Divizia C (Seria III)	10th	
