= Ohaba (disambiguation) =

Ohaba may refer to several places in Romania:

- Ohaba, a commune in Alba County
- Ohaba (Hungarian: Ohába), a village in Șinca Commune, Braşov County
- Ohaba, a village in Melinești Commune, Dolj County
- Ohaba, a village in Bălănești Commune, Gorj County
- Ohaba (Hungarian: Ohába), a village in Lăpugiu de Jos Commune, Hunedoara County
- Ohaba, a village in Șovarna Commune, Mehedinţi County
- Ohaba-Mâtnic, a village in Copăcele Commune, Caraș-Severin County
- Ohaba-Jiu, a village in Bolboși Commune, Gorj County
- Ohaba de sub Piatră, a village in Sălașu de Sus Commune, Hunedoara County
- Ohaba-Ponor, a village in Pui Commune, Hunedoara County
- Ohaba-Sibişel, a village in Râu de Mori Commune, Hunedoara County
- Ohaba Streiului, a village administered by Călan town, Hunedoara County
- Ohaba-Forgaci, a village in Boldur Commune, Timiș County
- Ohaba Lungă, a commune in Timiș County, and its village of Ohaba Română
- Stâncești-Ohaba, a village in Dobra Commune, Hunedoara County
- Ohaba, a tributary of the Bistra in Caraș-Severin County
- Ohaba, another name for the river Valea Mare in Hunedoara County
- Ohaba (Secaș), a river in Alba County
- Ohaba (Strei), a river in Hunedoara County
