= Gârbău (Secaș) =

- Location within Romania

Location
- Country: Romania
- Counties: Alba County
- Villages: Ghirbom, Berghin

Physical characteristics
- Mouth: Secaș
  - coordinates: 46.1092°N 23.7845°E
- Length: 13 km (8.1 mi)
- Basin size: 50 km^{2} (19 sq mi)

Basin features
- Progression: Secaș→ Târnava→ Mureș→ Tisza→ Danube→ Black Sea

The Gârbău is a left tributary of the river Secaș in Romania. It flows into the Secaș in Colibi. Its length is 13 km (8.1 mi) and its basin size is 50 km^{2} (19 sq mi).
