= Crăciunelu =

Crăciunelu may refer to one of two places in Alba County, Romania:

- Crăciunelu de Jos, a commune
- Crăciunelu de Sus, a village in Cetatea de Baltă Commune
