= CS CIL Blaj =

Romanian football club

CIL Blaj
- Full name: Clubul Sportiv CIL Blaj
- Nicknames: Trupa Libertății (The Freedom Band)
- Short name: Blaj
- Founded: 1961; 65 years ago
- Ground: CIL Veza
- Capacity: 500
- Owner: Blaj Municipality
- Chairman: Matei Basarab
- Head coach: Daniel Tătar
- League: Liga III
- 2025–26: Liga III, Seria VII, 8th
Home colours	Away colours

Clubul Sportiv CIL Blaj commonly known as CIL Blaj, is a Romanian football club based in Blaj, Alba County, currently playing in the Liga III, the third tier of the Romanian football, following their promotion at the end of the 2023–24 season.

== History ==
The football club from Blaj, a town nicknamed "Little Rome", was founded in 1961 as CIL Blaj, coinciding with the opening of the Combinatul de Industrializare a Lemnului (lit. 'Wood Industrialization Combine'), which also supported the team. The club initially competed in the Mediaș District Championship, then the fifth tier of Romanian football, before playing in the second tier of the Brașov Regional Championship.

The club reached the Round of 16 of the 1963–64 Cupa României, defeating Chimica Târnăveni 2–0, Gaz Metan Mediaș 2–1 and Rapid Târgu Mureș 2–0 before producing one of the biggest upsets in the competition's history by eliminating Petrolul Ploiești 1–0 (a.e.t.). Petrolul had won the trophy in the previous season and were one of Romania's strongest teams at the time. CIL's cup run ended in the Round of 16 with a 0–12 defeat against Steaua București.

CIL earned promotion to Divizia C for the first time at the end of the 1971–72 season, after winning the Alba County Championship and defeating Dacia Orăștie, the Hunedoara County Championship winners, 5–2 on aggregate in the promotion play-off, winning 5–0 at home before losing the return leg 0–2.

In their first season in Divizia C, CIL Blaj finished fourth in Series IX. The following campaigns proved more difficult, with the team narrowly avoiding relegation after finishing 13th in Series XII in 1973–74 and 13th in Series IX in 1974–75. A slight improvement followed with a tenth-place finish in Series XI in 1975–76, but CIL were relegated at the end of the 1976–77 season after finishing 15th in Series XII.

CIL quickly returned to Divizia C at the end of the following season, winning the Alba County Championship once again and earning promotion without having to contest a play-off, as Alba was one of the counties with fewer representatives in the third division.

In the 1978–79 season, CIL finished 13th in Series VIII, two points above the relegation zone. The following two campaigns, 1979–80 and 1980–81, both ended with seventh-place finishes in Series XI. Their spell in the third tier ended after the 1981–82 season, when a 15th-place finish resulted in relegation.

CIL won the 1982–83 Alba County Championship, but failed to gain promotion to Divizia C after losing 2–3 on aggregate to Minerul Șuncuiuș, the Bihor County Championship winners. CIL won the first leg 2–1 at home before losing 0–2 away.

In 1983, the club was renamed Târnavele Blaj, after the Târnava river system, whose two branches, the Târnava Mare and Târnava Mică, meet at Blaj. The team returned to the third division after winning the 1983–84 Alba County Championship and defeating Metalul Reghin, the Mureș County Championship winners, 4–3 on aggregate in the promotion play-off. After losing the first leg 0–2 away, Târnavele overturned the deficit with a 4–1 victory at home.

The stay in Divizia C proved brief, as Târnavele finished last in Series XI in the 1984–85 season and were relegated to the fourth tier. The club immediately bounced back, winning the 1985–86 Alba County Championship and defeating CFR Arad, the Arad County Championship winners, 5–1 on aggregate in the promotion play-off, following victories of 3–1 away and 2–0 at home.

Following the Romanian Revolution and the restructuring of Romanian football, the club spent much of the following decades in the county competitions. In 2002, CIL came close to returning to the third tier, but lost the promotion play-off against Textila Cisnădie 6–7 on penalties. Blaj was nevertheless represented in the third division between 2003 and 2008 by Inter Blaj, which spent five consecutive seasons at that level before being relegated in 2008.

CIL continued to compete mainly at county level during the following years. The club enjoyed a resurgence in the early 2020s and won the Liga IV Alba championship in the 2023–24 season. Under head coach Daniel Tătar, CIL completed its league and promotion play-off campaign unbeaten and secured promotion to Liga III after defeating ACSM Codlea 3–2 on aggregate, winning the first leg 2–1 away before drawing 1–1 in Blaj. The promotion marked the return of a team from Blaj to the third tier after a 16-year absence.

CIL maintained its place in Liga III and competed in the division again in the 2025–26 season. The team finished fifth in the play-out of Series VII and subsequently began preparations for a third consecutive season in the third tier in 2026–27, continuing under head coach Daniel Tătar.

== Honours ==
Liga IV – Alba County

- Winners (7): 1971–72, 1977–78, 1982–83, 1983–84, 1985–86, 2001–02, 2023–24
- Runners-up (2): 1969–70, 1970–71

Liga V – Alba County

- Winners (2): 2010–11, 2013–14

== Players ==
=== First team squad ===
As of 10 September 2024

Note: Flags indicate national team as defined under FIFA eligibility rules; some limited exceptions apply. Players may hold more than one non-FIFA nationality.

No.	Pos.	Nation	Player
1	GK	ROU	Rareș Agârbiceanu
2	DF	ROU	Zoltan Borșoi
3	DF	ROU	Mihai Drăgan
4	DF	ROU	Cristobal Oprișor
5	DF	ROU	Bogdan Jica
6	MF	ROU	Marius Cîmpean
7	MF	ROU	Filip Taifas
8	FW	ROU	Darius Stănilă
10	MF	ROU	Rareș Iaru
12	MF	ROU	Călin Cristea
14	MF	ROU	Sebastian Roșian
15	MF	ROU	Daniel Șerban
16	DF	ROU	Raul Comșa

No.	Pos.	Nation	Player
17	DF	ROU	Daniel Tătar
18	FW	ROU	Daniel Vlad
19	DF	ROU	David Moldovan
20	MF	ROU	Daniel Olariu
21	FW	ROU	Daniel Nicula
22	MF	ROU	Raul Tomuță
23	GK	ROU	Radu Damian
30	GK	ROU	George Păduraru
46	FW	ROU	Adrian Cîrstean
77	FW	ROU	Romulus Cioară
87	MF	ROU	Sebastian Magyari
88	DF	ROU	Andrei Câmpean (Captain)
97	DF	ROU	Valentin Boldea

=== Out on loan ===
Note: Flags indicate national team as defined under FIFA eligibility rules; some limited exceptions apply. Players may hold more than one non-FIFA nationality.

No. / Pos. / Nation / Player	No. / Pos. / Nation / Player

== Club Officials ==
=== Board of directors ===
Role	Name
Owner	(Romania) Municipality of Blaj
President	(Romania) Matei Basarab
Vice-president	(Romania) Mario Dumitriu
Board Member	(Romania) Florin Ganea
Organizer of Competitions	(Romania) Costică Gutunoiu

=== Current technical staff ===
Role	Name
Technical director	(Romania) Marius Oprean
Head coach	(Romania) Daniel Tătar
Assistant manager	(Romania) Traian Pavel
Goalkeeping coach	(Romania) Matei Brînzan
Club Doctor	(Romania) Matei Ciolan
Kinetotherapist	(Romania) Aurelian Matei

== League history ==
Season	Tier	Division	Place	Notes	Cupa României
2026–27	3	Liga III	TBD		Play-off round
2025–26	3	Liga III (Seria VII)	8th		
2024–25	3	Liga III (Seria VII)	7th		
2023–24	4	Liga IV (AB)	1st (C)	Promoted	
2022–23	4	Liga IV (AB)	3rd		
2021–22	4	Liga IV (AB)	4th		
2020–21	Not active due to the COVID 19-pandemic				
2019–20	4	Liga IV (AB)	7th		
2018–19	4	Liga IV (AB)	3rd		
2017–18	4	Liga IV (AB)	8th		
