= Dunărița =

- Location within Romania

Location
- Country: Romania
- Counties: Alba County
- Villages: Bucerdea Grânoasă

Physical characteristics
- Mouth: Târnava
  - coordinates: 46.1866°N 23.7732°E
- Length: 13 km (8.1 mi)
- Basin size: 64 km^{2} (25 sq mi)

Basin features
- Progression: Târnava→ Mureș→ Tisza→ Danube→ Black Sea
- Tributaries
  - right: Șoimuș

The Dunărița is a right tributary of the river Târnava in Romania. It flows into the Târnava near Cistei. Its length is 13 km (8.1 mi) and its basin size is 64 km^{2} (25 sq mi).
