= 1983–84 County Championship =

42nd season of the Liga IV, the fourth tier of the Romanian football league

Liga IV
- Season: 1983–84

The 1983–84 County Championship was the 42nd season of the Liga IV, the fourth tier of the Romanian football league system. The champions of each county association play against one from a neighboring county in a play-off to gain promotion to Divizia C.

== County championships ==
- Alba (AB)
- Arad (AR)
- Argeș (AG)
- Bacău (BC)
- Bihor (BH)
- Bistrița-Năsăud (BN)
- Botoșani (BT)
- Brașov (BV)
- Brăila (BR)
- Bucharest (B)
- Buzău (BZ)
- Caraș-Severin (CS)
- Călărași (CL)
- Cluj (CJ)
- Constanța (CT)
- Covasna (CV)
- Dâmbovița (DB)
- Dolj (DJ)
- Galați (GL)
- Giurgiu (GR)
- Gorj (GJ)
- Harghita (HR)
- Hunedoara (HD)
- Ialomița (IL)
- Iași (IS)
- Ilfov (IF)
- Maramureș (MM)
- Mehedinți (MH)
- Mureș (MS)
- Neamț (NT)
- Olt (OT)
- Prahova (PH)
- Satu Mare (SM)
- Sălaj (SJ)
- Sibiu (SB)
- Suceava (SV)
- Teleorman (TR)
- Timiș (TM)
- Tulcea (TL)
- Vaslui (VS)
- Vâlcea (VL)
- Vrancea (VN)

== Promotion play-off ==
Teams promoted to Divizia C without a play-off matches as teams from less represented counties in the third division.

- (IS) Tepro Iași
- (CJ) Motorul IRA Cluj-Napoca
- (BN) Energia Prundu Bârgăului
- (VL) Forestierul Băbeni
- (VS) Unirea Negrești
- (BT) Luceafărul Botoșani
- (GR) Constructorul TCIAZ Giurgiu

Preliminary round

The matches were played on 8 and 12 June 1984.

| Team 1 | Agg. | Team 2 | 1st leg | 2nd leg |
|---|---|---|---|---|
| TMB București (B) | 10–0 | (IF) Metalul Periș | 4–0 | 6–0 |

The matches were played on 8 and 15 July 1984.

| Team 1 | Agg. | Team 2 | 1st leg | 2nd leg |
|---|---|---|---|---|
| IS Sighetu Marmației (MM) | 1–3 | (SV) Viitorul Câmpulung Moldovenesc | 1–2 | 0–1 |
| Motorul Arad (AR) | 3–4 | (BH) Recolta Salonta | 1–1 | 2–3 |
| Textila Buhuși (BC) | 7–3 | (VN) Siretul Suraia | 7–0 | 0–3 |
| Construcții Sibiu (SB) | 3–3 (Note: Cimentul Hoghiz won on the away goals rule.) | (BV) Cimentul Hoghiz | 3–1 | 0–2 |
| TMB București (B) | 4–1 | (PH) Victoria Florești | 2–0 | 2–1 |
| Constructorul Satu Mare (SM) | 3–1 | (SJ) Izolatorul Armătura Șimleu Silvaniei | 3–0 | 0–1 |
| Avicola Crevedia (DB) | 8–5 | (AG) Progresul Topoloveni | 6–2 | 2–3 |
| Progresul Brăila (BR) | 2–4 | (CT) Marina Mangalia | 1–0 | 1–4 |
| Metalul Reghin (MS) | 3–4 | (AB) Târnavele Blaj | 2–0 | 1–4 |
| ASA Buzău (BZ) | 3–3 (5–3 p) | (CV) IPT Întorsura Buzăului | 2–1 | 1–2 |
| Agronomia Slobozia (IL) | 6–1 | (CL) Dunărea Grădiștea | 2–0 | 4–1 |
| CFR Simeria (HD) | 2–3 | (CS) CSM Caransebeș | 2–0 | 0–3 |
| Energia Rovinari (GJ) | 1–2 | (DJ) Victoria Craiova | 1–0 | 0–2 |
| Granitul Babadag (TL) | 1–2 | (GL) Avântul Matca | 0–0 | 1–2 |
| Danubiana Roman (NT) | 3–5 | (HR) Progresul Odorheiu Secuiesc | 2–2 | 1–3 |
| IOB Balș (OT) | 3–6 | (TR) Metalul Alexandria | 2–1 | 1–5 (a.e.t.) |
| Victoria Vânju Mare (MH) | 0–2 | (TM) Obilici Sânmartinu Sârbesc | 0–1 | 0–1 |

== Championships standings ==
=== Arad County ===
Series A

| Pos | Team | Pld | W | D | L | GF | GA | GD | Pts | Qualification or relegation |
|---|---|---|---|---|---|---|---|---|---|---|
| 1 | Motorul Arad (Q) | 30 | 25 | 3 | 2 | 81 | 12 | +69 | 53 | Qualification to championship final |
| 2 | Progresul Pecica | 30 | 25 | 2 | 3 | 100 | 26 | +74 | 52 | |
| 3 | Mureșul Zădăreni | 30 | 17 | 1 | 12 | 55 | 36 | +19 | 35 | |
| 4 | Chimia Arad | 30 | 14 | 6 | 10 | 60 | 37 | +23 | 34 | |
| 5 | Gloria Arad | 30 | 14 | 6 | 10 | 48 | 41 | +7 | 34 | |
| 6 | Fulgerul Arad | 30 | 10 | 8 | 12 | 54 | 45 | +9 | 28 | |
| 7 | Semlecana Semlac | 30 | 12 | 4 | 14 | 38 | 48 | −10 | 28 | |
| 8 | Olimpia ISD Arad | 30 | 11 | 6 | 13 | 46 | 60 | −14 | 28 | |
| 9 | Viitorul Turnu | 30 | 12 | 4 | 14 | 54 | 74 | −20 | 28 | |
| 10 | Victoria Nădlac | 30 | 12 | 3 | 15 | 37 | 54 | −17 | 27 | |
| 11 | Victoria Zăbrani | 30 | 12 | 2 | 16 | 53 | 61 | −8 | 26 | |
| 12 | Foresta Sânpetru German | 30 | 11 | 4 | 15 | 39 | 52 | −13 | 26 | |
| 13 | CPL Arad | 30 | 10 | 5 | 15 | 38 | 56 | −18 | 25 | |
| 14 | Victoria Ceasuri Arad | 30 | 8 | 8 | 14 | 45 | 49 | −4 | 24 | |
| 15 | Înfrățirea Iratoșu (R) | 30 | 8 | 6 | 16 | 37 | 73 | −36 | 22 | Relegation to Arad County Championship II |
| 16 | Unirea Șeitin (R) | 30 | 4 | 2 | 24 | 35 | 96 | −61 | 10 | Relegation to Arad County Championship II |

Rules for classification: 1) Points; 2) Goal difference; 3) Number of goals scored.
(Q) Qualified for the phase indicated; (R) Relegated

Series B

| Pos | Team | Pld | W | D | L | GF | GA | GD | Pts | Qualification or relegation |
|---|---|---|---|---|---|---|---|---|---|---|
| 1 | Strungul Chișineu-Criș (Q) | 30 | 22 | 5 | 3 | 73 | 23 | +50 | 49 | Qualification to championship final |
| 2 | Frontiera Curtici | 30 | 17 | 4 | 9 | 85 | 46 | +39 | 38 | |
| 3 | Șoimii Pâncota | 30 | 16 | 5 | 9 | 53 | 31 | +22 | 37 | |
| 4 | Gloria Ineu | 30 | 15 | 6 | 9 | 57 | 29 | +28 | 36 | |
| 5 | Șiriana Șiria | 30 | 16 | 3 | 11 | 68 | 48 | +20 | 35 | |
| 6 | Voința Macea | 30 | 15 | 4 | 11 | 57 | 47 | +10 | 34 | |
| 7 | Unirea Ineu | 30 | 13 | 5 | 12 | 56 | 48 | +8 | 31 | |
| 8 | Unirea Șofronea | 30 | 13 | 4 | 13 | 67 | 52 | +15 | 30 | |
| 9 | Unirea Sântana | 30 | 12 | 5 | 13 | 46 | 45 | +1 | 29 | |
| 10 | Dacia Beliu | 30 | 12 | 5 | 13 | 42 | 55 | −13 | 29 | |
| 11 | Agrișu Mic | 30 | 12 | 4 | 14 | 55 | 65 | −10 | 28 | |
| 12 | Confecția Hălmagiu | 30 | 11 | 5 | 14 | 59 | 67 | −8 | 27 | |
| 13 | Crișana Sebiș | 30 | 9 | 8 | 13 | 42 | 51 | −9 | 26 | |
| 14 | Cermei | 30 | 12 | 4 | 14 | 42 | 62 | −20 | 26 (Note: Cermei deducted 2 points.) | |
| 15 | Înainte Sânmartin (R) | 30 | 8 | 5 | 17 | 50 | 68 | −18 | 21 | Relegation to Arad County Championship II |
| 16 | Crișul Buteni (R) | 30 | 1 | 0 | 29 | 18 | 133 | −115 | 2 | Relegation to Arad County Championship II |

Rules for classification: 1) Points; 2) Goal difference; 3) Number of goals scored.
(Q) Qualified for the phase indicated; (R) Relegated
Notes:

Championship final

| Team 1 | Agg. | Team 2 | 1st leg | 2nd leg |
|---|---|---|---|---|
| Motorul Arad | – | Strungul Chișineu-Criș | – | – |

Motorul Arad won the Arad County Championship and qualify for promotion play-off in Divizia C.

=== Botoșani County ===
| Pos | Team | Pld | W | D | L | GF | GA | GD | Pts | Qualification or relegation |
|---|---|---|---|---|---|---|---|---|---|---|
| 1 | Luceafărul Botoșani (C, Q) | 24 | 20 | 2 | 2 | 84 | 26 | +58 | 42 | Qualification to promotion play-off |
| 2 | Metalul Botoșani | 24 | 19 | 2 | 3 | 96 | 15 | +81 | 40 | |
| 3 | Ceramica Mașini Unelte Dorohoi | 24 | 19 | 2 | 3 | 85 | 29 | +56 | 40 | |
| 4 | Sănătatea Darabani | 24 | 12 | 2 | 10 | 51 | 39 | +12 | 26 | |
| 5 | Zorile Roma | 24 | 11 | 0 | 13 | 54 | 51 | +3 | 22 | |
| 6 | Flacăra Flămânzi | 24 | 10 | 2 | 12 | 49 | 53 | −4 | 22 | |
| 7 | Avântul Albești | 24 | 9 | 3 | 12 | 46 | 50 | −4 | 21 | |
| 8 | Sportivul Trușești | 24 | 9 | 2 | 13 | 60 | 56 | +4 | 20 | |
| 9 | Spicul Avrămeni | 23 | 7 | 5 | 11 | 32 | 61 | −29 | 19 | |
| 10 | Voința Șendriceni | 24 | 9 | 1 | 14 | 37 | 69 | −32 | 19 | |
| 11 | Electro Avântul Mihai Eminescu | 23 | 8 | 1 | 14 | 40 | 67 | −27 | 17 | |
| 12 | Recolta Mileanca | 24 | 7 | 2 | 15 | 35 | 85 | −50 | 16 | |
| 13 | Rapid Ungureni | 24 | 4 | 2 | 18 | 20 | 76 | −56 | 10 | |

Rules for classification: 1) Points; 2) Goal difference; 3) Number of goals scored.
(C) Champions; (Q) Qualified for the phase indicated

=== Harghita County ===
| Pos | Team | Pld | W | D | L | GF | GA | GD | Pts | Qualification or relegation |
|---|---|---|---|---|---|---|---|---|---|---|
| 1 | Progresul Odorheiu Secuiesc (C, Q) | 26 | 23 | 1 | 2 | 117 | 12 | +105 | 47 | Qualification to promotion play-off |
| 2 | Tractorul Miercurea Ciuc | 26 | 23 | 1 | 2 | 112 | 20 | +92 | 44 (Note: Tractorul Miercurea Ciuc deducted 3 points.) | |
| 3 | Harghita Miercurea Ciuc | 26 | 18 | 2 | 6 | 72 | 20 | +52 | 38 | |
| 4 | Harghita Odorheiu Secuiesc | 26 | 13 | 3 | 10 | 44 | 42 | +2 | 29 | |
| 5 | Unirea Hodoșa | 26 | 11 | 7 | 8 | 46 | 48 | −2 | 29 | |
| 6 | Mobila Ditrău | 26 | 12 | 3 | 11 | 36 | 37 | −1 | 27 | |
| 7 | Metalul Vlăhița | 26 | 11 | 2 | 13 | 48 | 52 | −4 | 24 | |
| 8 | Șoimii Băile Tușnad | 26 | 9 | 5 | 12 | 42 | 68 | −26 | 23 | |
| 9 | ITA Cârța | 26 | 9 | 2 | 15 | 30 | 62 | −32 | 20 | |
| 10 | Complexul Gălăuțaș | 26 | 7 | 5 | 14 | 25 | 49 | −24 | 19 | |
| 11 | Flamura Roșie Sânsimion (Note: Flamura Roșie Sânsimion was excluded from championship.) (R) | 26 | 6 | 6 | 14 | 35 | 63 | −28 | 18 | Relegation to Harghita County Championship II |
| 12 | Constructorul Miercurea Ciuc | 26 | 6 | 5 | 15 | 42 | 73 | −31 | 17 | |
| 13 | Viață Nouă Remetea | 26 | 5 | 6 | 15 | 32 | 55 | −23 | 16 | |
| 14 | Rapid Porumbenii Mari (R) | 26 | 3 | 2 | 21 | 16 | 96 | −80 | 8 | Relegation to Harghita County Championship II |

Rules for classification: 1) Points; 2) Goal difference; 3) Number of goals scored.
(C) Champions; (Q) Qualified for the phase indicated; (R) Relegated

=== Hunedoara County ===
Valea Jiului Series

| Pos | Team | Pld | W | D | L | GF | GA | GD | Pts | Qualification or relegation |
|---|---|---|---|---|---|---|---|---|---|---|
| 1 | Minerul Uricani (Q) | 22 | 19 | 0 | 3 | 72 | 16 | +56 | 38 | Qualification to championship final |
| 2 | Parângul Lonea | 22 | 16 | 2 | 4 | 73 | 22 | +51 | 34 | |
| 3 | Avântul Hațeg | 22 | 13 | 3 | 6 | 48 | 23 | +25 | 29 | |
| 4 | Preparatorul Petrila | 22 | 14 | 0 | 8 | 70 | 30 | +40 | 28 | |
| 5 | Preparatorul Lupeni | 22 | 12 | 1 | 9 | 52 | 52 | 0 | 25 | |
| 6 | Hidromin Petroșani | 22 | 11 | 2 | 9 | 49 | 31 | +18 | 24 | |
| 7 | Măgura Pui | 22 | 9 | 2 | 11 | 40 | 49 | −9 | 20 | |
| 8 | Minerul Bărbăteni | 21 | 9 | 1 | 11 | 33 | 48 | −15 | 19 | |
| 9 | Autobuzul Petroșani | 22 | 7 | 3 | 12 | 47 | 60 | −13 | 17 | |
| 10 | CFR Petroșani | 22 | 6 | 2 | 14 | 27 | 49 | −22 | 14 | |
| 11 | Minerul Boița | 22 | 4 | 0 | 18 | 22 | 94 | −72 | 8 | |
| 12 | Sănătatea Vulcan | 21 | 3 | 0 | 18 | 16 | 75 | −59 | 6 | |

Rules for classification: 1) Points; 2) Goal difference; 3) Number of goals scored.
(Q) Qualified for the phase indicated

Valea Mureșului Series

| Pos | Team | Pld | W | D | L | GF | GA | GD | Pts | Qualification or relegation |
|---|---|---|---|---|---|---|---|---|---|---|
| 1 | CFR Simeria (Q) | 26 | 21 | 3 | 2 | 98 | 13 | +85 | 45 | Qualification to championship final |
| 2 | Constructorul Hunedoara | 26 | 16 | 5 | 5 | 80 | 22 | +58 | 37 | |
| 3 | Voința Ilia | 26 | 15 | 5 | 6 | 54 | 26 | +28 | 35 | |
| 4 | Streiul Simeria Veche | 26 | 14 | 4 | 8 | 46 | 20 | +26 | 32 | |
| 5 | Metalul Crișcior | 26 | 12 | 5 | 9 | 50 | 35 | +15 | 29 | |
| 6 | Oxigenul Hunedoara | 26 | 10 | 7 | 9 | 57 | 44 | +13 | 27 | |
| 7 | Recolta Băcia | 26 | 8 | 8 | 10 | 42 | 48 | −6 | 24 | |
| 8 | Unirea Zam | 26 | 10 | 3 | 13 | 39 | 73 | −34 | 23 | |
| 9 | Foresta Orăștie | 26 | 8 | 6 | 12 | 36 | 54 | −18 | 22 | |
| 10 | Dacia service Hunedoara | 26 | 8 | 6 | 12 | 38 | 59 | −21 | 22 | |
| 11 | Mureșul Pricaz | 26 | 9 | 4 | 13 | 28 | 66 | −38 | 22 | |
| 12 | IMC Bârcea | 26 | 6 | 4 | 16 | 35 | 57 | −22 | 16 | |
| 13 | Minerul Teliuc | 26 | 5 | 6 | 15 | 33 | 71 | −38 | 14 (Note: Minerul Teliuc deducted one point.) | |
| 14 | Streiul Boșorod | 26 | 6 | 2 | 18 | 34 | 82 | −48 | 14 | |

Rules for classification: 1) Points; 2) Goal difference; 3) Number of goals scored.
(Q) Qualified for the phase indicated
Notes:

Championship final

The matches were played on 7 and 10 June 1984.

| Team 1 | Agg. | Team 2 | 1st leg | 2nd leg |
|---|---|---|---|---|
| Minerul Uricani | 1–5 | CFR Simeria | 1–2 | 0–3 |

CFR Simeria won the Hunedoara County Championship and qualify for promotion play-off in Divizia C.

=== Maramureș County ===
North Series

| Pos | Team | Pld | W | D | L | GF | GA | GD | Pts | Qualification or relegation |
|---|---|---|---|---|---|---|---|---|---|---|
| 1 | IS Sighetu Marmației (Q) | 18 | 12 | 2 | 4 | 55 | 15 | +40 | 24 (Note: Mecanica Sighetu Marmației and Forestiera Câmpulung la Tisa were deducted 2 points.) | Qualification to championship final |
| 2 | Maramureșana Sighetu Marmației | 18 | 10 | 2 | 6 | 46 | 24 | +22 | 22 | |
| 3 | Recolta Rozavlea | 18 | 11 | 0 | 7 | 39 | 39 | 0 | 22 | |
| 4 | Zorile Moisei | 18 | 9 | 1 | 8 | 44 | 35 | +9 | 19 | |
| 5 | Iza Dragomirești | 18 | 8 | 2 | 8 | 33 | 32 | +1 | 18 | |
| 6 | AEI Sighetu Marmației | 18 | 8 | 1 | 9 | 29 | 36 | −7 | 17 | |
| 7 | Metalul Bogdan Vodă | 18 | 7 | 2 | 9 | 26 | 34 | −8 | 16 | |
| 8 | IPP Coștiui | 18 | 5 | 3 | 10 | 30 | 54 | −24 | 13 | |
| 9 | Recolta Remeți | 18 | 4 | 4 | 10 | 28 | 49 | −21 | 12 | |
| 10 | Forestiera Câmpulung la Tisa | 18 | 5 | 3 | 10 | 22 | 34 | −12 | 11 | |

(Q) Qualified for the phase indicated
Notes:

South Series

| Pos | Team | Pld | W | D | L | GF | GA | GD | Pts | Qualification or relegation |
|---|---|---|---|---|---|---|---|---|---|---|
| 1 | Simared Baia Mare (Q) | 22 | 18 | 1 | 3 | 74 | 16 | +58 | 37 | Qualification to championship final |
| 2 | Electrica Baia Mare | 22 | 16 | 1 | 5 | 66 | 25 | +41 | 33 | |
| 3 | Tractorul Satulung | 22 | 15 | 2 | 5 | 82 | 24 | +58 | 32 | |
| 4 | Stăruința Recea | 22 | 12 | 3 | 7 | 57 | 36 | +21 | 27 | |
| 5 | Spicul Mocira | 22 | 12 | 2 | 8 | 47 | 35 | +12 | 26 | |
| 6 | Prefabricate Mireșu Mare | 22 | 10 | 3 | 9 | 39 | 47 | −8 | 23 | |
| 7 | Sportul Muncitoresc Cavnic | 22 | 8 | 4 | 10 | 42 | 49 | −7 | 20 | |
| 8 | Unirea Seini | 22 | 8 | 3 | 11 | 33 | 48 | −15 | 19 | |
| 9 | Spicul Ardusat | 22 | 8 | 3 | 11 | 36 | 63 | −27 | 19 | |
| 10 | Olimpia Baia Mare | 22 | 6 | 0 | 16 | 35 | 65 | −30 | 12 | |
| 11 | Baia Mare II | 22 | 3 | 3 | 16 | 16 | 52 | −36 | 9 | |
| 12 | Măgura Coaș | 22 | 2 | 3 | 17 | 28 | 95 | −67 | 7 | |

(Q) Qualified for the phase indicated

Championship final

The championship final was played on 10 June 1984 at Comunal Stadium in Seini.

| Team 1 | Score | Team 2 |
|---|---|---|
| IS Sighetu Marmației | 1–1 (5–4 p) | Simared Baia Mare |

IS Sighetu Marmației won the Maramureș County Championship and qualify to promotion play-off in Divizia C.

=== Mureș County ===
| Pos | Team | Pld | W | D | L | GF | GA | GD | Pts | Qualification or relegation |
|---|---|---|---|---|---|---|---|---|---|---|
| 1 | Metalul Reghin (C, Q) | 26 | 17 | 3 | 6 | 48 | 26 | +22 | 37 | Qualification to promotion play-off |
| 2 | Lacul Ursu Sovata | 26 | 15 | 3 | 8 | 44 | 20 | +24 | 33 | |
| 3 | Viitorul Târgu Mureș | 26 | 13 | 6 | 7 | 43 | 24 | +19 | 32 | |
| 4 | Autobuzul Târnăveni | 26 | 12 | 3 | 11 | 48 | 37 | +11 | 27 | |
| 5 | Sticla Târnăveni | 26 | 12 | 3 | 11 | 37 | 27 | +10 | 27 | |
| 6 | IRA Târgu Mureș | 26 | 12 | 3 | 11 | 39 | 32 | +7 | 27 | |
| 7 | Energia Iernut | 26 | 11 | 5 | 10 | 33 | 31 | +2 | 27 | |
| 8 | Valea Mureșului Gornești | 26 | 10 | 6 | 10 | 33 | 32 | +1 | 26 | |
| 9 | Voința Sângeorgiu de Pădure | 26 | 13 | 0 | 13 | 36 | 42 | −6 | 26 | |
| 10 | Faianța Sighișoara | 26 | 10 | 5 | 11 | 33 | 37 | −4 | 25 | |
| 11 | Constructorul Târgu Mureș | 26 | 10 | 4 | 12 | 37 | 40 | −3 | 24 | |
| 12 | Recolta Vidrasău | 26 | 8 | 6 | 12 | 35 | 41 | −6 | 22 | |
| 13 | Spicul Crăiești (R) | 26 | 7 | 4 | 15 | 32 | 70 | −38 | 18 | Relegation to Mureș County Championship II |
| 14 | Transportul Târgu Mureș (R) | 26 | 4 | 5 | 17 | 13 | 52 | −39 | 13 | Relegation to Mureș County Championship II |

Rules for classification: 1) Points; 2) Goal difference; 3) Number of goals scored.
(C) Champions; (Q) Qualified for the phase indicated; (R) Relegated

=== Neamț County ===
| Pos | Team | Pld | W | D | L | GF | GA | GD | Pts | Qualification or relegation |
|---|---|---|---|---|---|---|---|---|---|---|
| 1 | Danubiana Roman (C, Q) | 22 | 18 | 2 | 2 | 94 | 19 | +75 | 38 | Qualification to promotion play-off |
| 2 | Cimentul Bicaz | 22 | 18 | 2 | 2 | 63 | 11 | +52 | 38 | |
| 3 | Bradul Roznov | 22 | 12 | 2 | 8 | 63 | 28 | +35 | 26 | Promotion to Divizia C (Note: Bradul Roznov merged with Celuloza Piatra-Neamț, it was renamed Celuloza Bradul Roznov and took its place in Divizia C.) |
| 4 | CPL Piatra Neamț | 22 | 11 | 4 | 7 | 36 | 33 | +3 | 26 | |
| 5 | Viitorul Podoleni | 22 | 9 | 4 | 9 | 50 | 74 | −24 | 20 (Note: Viitorul Podoleni, Unirea Trifești and Vulturul Zănești were deducted 2 points.) | |
| 6 | IM Piatra Neamț | 22 | 9 | 1 | 12 | 40 | 34 | +6 | 19 | |
| 7 | ITA Piatra Neamț | 22 | 7 | 4 | 11 | 39 | 51 | −12 | 18 | |
| 8 | Unirea Trifești | 22 | 8 | 4 | 10 | 44 | 66 | −22 | 18 | |
| 9 | Vulturul Zănești | 22 | 9 | 2 | 11 | 41 | 64 | −23 | 18 | |
| 10 | Recolta Horia | 22 | 7 | 4 | 11 | 30 | 51 | −21 | 14 (Note: Recolta Horia and Energia Săbăoani were deducted 4 points.) | |
| 11 | Șoimii Piatra Șoimului | 22 | 5 | 1 | 16 | 31 | 60 | −29 | 11 | Spared from relegation (Note: Șoimii Piatra Șoimului and Energia Săbăoani was spared from relegation due to the expanded of the championship to 14 teams.) |
| 12 | Energia Săbăoani | 22 | 3 | 2 | 17 | 33 | 73 | −40 | 4 | Spared from relegation |

Rules for classification: 1) Points; 2) Goal difference; 3) Number of goals scored.
(C) Champions; (Q) Qualified for the phase indicated

=== Prahova County ===
| Pos | Team | Pld | W | D | L | GF | GA | GD | Pts | Qualification or relegation |
|---|---|---|---|---|---|---|---|---|---|---|
| 1 | Victoria Florești (C, Q) | 34 | 23 | 6 | 5 | 65 | 21 | +44 | 52 | Qualification to promotion play-off |
| 2 | Oțelul Câmpina | 34 | 19 | 7 | 8 | 50 | 22 | +28 | 45 | |
| 3 | Geamul Scăieni | 34 | 16 | 7 | 11 | 56 | 35 | +21 | 39 | |
| 4 | Petrolistul Boldești | 34 | 17 | 4 | 13 | 52 | 49 | +3 | 38 | |
| 5 | Feroemail Ploiești | 34 | 15 | 8 | 11 | 49 | 50 | −1 | 38 | |
| 6 | Chimistul Valea Călugărească | 34 | 15 | 6 | 13 | 42 | 38 | +4 | 36 | |
| 7 | Avântul Măneciu | 34 | 17 | 2 | 15 | 55 | 54 | +1 | 36 | |
| 8 | Sportul Muncitoresc Câmpina | 34 | 12 | 10 | 12 | 32 | 35 | −3 | 34 | |
| 9 | Metalul Filipeștii de Pădure | 34 | 13 | 6 | 15 | 51 | 50 | +1 | 32 | |
| 10 | Neptun Câmpina | 34 | 11 | 10 | 13 | 32 | 35 | −3 | 32 | |
| 11 | Unirea Teleajen Ploiești | 34 | 13 | 6 | 15 | 31 | 36 | −5 | 32 | |
| 12 | Știința CSU Ploiești | 34 | 10 | 11 | 13 | 36 | 42 | −6 | 31 | |
| 13 | Precizia Breaza | 34 | 12 | 7 | 15 | 38 | 49 | −11 | 31 | |
| 14 | Caraimanul Bușteni | 34 | 12 | 5 | 17 | 39 | 42 | −3 | 29 | |
| 15 | IUC Ploiești | 34 | 11 | 7 | 16 | 44 | 55 | −11 | 29 | |
| 16 | Voința Vărbilău | 34 | 12 | 5 | 17 | 43 | 65 | −22 | 29 | |
| 17 | ASA Ploiești (R) | 34 | 10 | 7 | 17 | 40 | 44 | −4 | 27 | Relegation to Prahova County Championship II |
| 18 | Metalul Vălenii de Munte (R) | 34 | 10 | 3 | 21 | 30 | 62 | −32 | 23 | Relegation to Prahova County Championship II |

Rules for classification: 1) Points; 2) Goal difference; 3) Number of goals scored.
(C) Champions; (Q) Qualified for the phase indicated; (R) Relegated

=== Sălaj County ===
Series I

| Pos | Team | Pld | W | D | L | GF | GA | GD | Pts | Qualification or relegation |
|---|---|---|---|---|---|---|---|---|---|---|
| 1 | Victoria Românași (Q) | 26 | 17 | 5 | 4 | 76 | 30 | +46 | 39 | Qualification to championship final |
| 2 | Energia Sânmihaiu Almașului | 26 | 17 | 1 | 8 | 57 | 35 | +22 | 35 | |
| 3 | Minerul Surduc | 26 | 14 | 4 | 8 | 75 | 50 | +25 | 32 | |
| 4 | Calmin Băbeni | 26 | 13 | 4 | 9 | 66 | 45 | +21 | 30 | |
| 5 | Recolta Agrij | 26 | 13 | 3 | 10 | 70 | 52 | +18 | 29 | |
| 6 | Speranța Sânpetru Almașului | 26 | 13 | 3 | 10 | 49 | 51 | −2 | 29 | |
| 7 | Topitorul Someș-Odorhei | 26 | 10 | 7 | 9 | 49 | 54 | −5 | 27 | |
| 8 | Unirea Hida | 26 | 12 | 2 | 12 | 83 | 57 | +26 | 26 | |
| 9 | Flacăra Rona | 26 | 12 | 2 | 12 | 53 | 50 | +3 | 26 | |
| 10 | Minerul Letca | 26 | 11 | 4 | 11 | 46 | 60 | −14 | 24 (Note: Minerul Letca deducted 2 points.) | |
| 11 | Voința Motiș | 26 | 7 | 7 | 12 | 41 | 63 | −22 | 21 | |
| 12 | Progresul Bălan | 26 | 8 | 3 | 15 | 54 | 55 | −1 | 19 | |
| 13 | Luceafărul Someș-Guruslău | 26 | 5 | 4 | 17 | 29 | 68 | −39 | 14 | |
| 14 | Columna Jac | 26 | 4 | 3 | 19 | 27 | 105 | −78 | 11 | |

(Q) Qualified for the phase indicated
Notes:

Series II

| Pos | Team | Pld | W | D | L | GF | GA | GD | Pts | Qualification or relegation |
|---|---|---|---|---|---|---|---|---|---|---|
| 1 | Izolatorul Armătura Șimleu Silvaniei (Q) | 26 | 19 | 4 | 3 | 84 | 22 | +62 | 42 | Qualification to championship final |
| 2 | Voința Derșida | 26 | 17 | 4 | 5 | 60 | 28 | +32 | 38 | |
| 3 | Recolta Zăuan | 26 | 15 | 6 | 5 | 54 | 29 | +25 | 36 | |
| 4 | Recolta Sărmășag | 26 | 15 | 3 | 8 | 53 | 41 | +12 | 33 | |
| 5 | Spartac Crasna | 26 | 13 | 5 | 8 | 52 | 38 | +14 | 31 | |
| 6 | Gloria Bobota | 26 | 12 | 3 | 11 | 63 | 46 | +17 | 27 | |
| 7 | Minerul Ip | 26 | 11 | 5 | 10 | 46 | 33 | +13 | 27 | |
| 8 | Olimpic Bocșa | 26 | 12 | 0 | 14 | 47 | 50 | −3 | 24 | |
| 9 | Avântul Lompirt | 26 | 9 | 4 | 13 | 43 | 50 | −7 | 22 | |
| 10 | Unirea Hereclean | 26 | 8 | 4 | 14 | 38 | 68 | −30 | 20 | |
| 11 | Recolta Crișeni | 26 | 9 | 3 | 14 | 53 | 60 | −7 | 19 (Note: Recolta Crișeni deducted 2 points.) | |
| 12 | Minerul Sighetu Silvaniei | 26 | 8 | 3 | 15 | 32 | 71 | −39 | 19 | |
| 13 | Recolta Halmășd | 26 | 7 | 4 | 15 | 34 | 70 | −36 | 18 | |
| 14 | Semănătorul Cizer | 26 | 2 | 2 | 22 | 17 | 70 | −53 | 6 | |

(Q) Qualified for the phase indicated
Notes:

Championship final

The match was played on 10 June 1984 at 23 August Stadium in Zalău.

| Team 1 | Score | Team 2 |
|---|---|---|
| Izolatorul Armătura Șimleu Silvaniei | 3–1 | Victoria Românași |

Izolatorul Armătura Șimleu Silvaniei won the Sălaj County Championship and qualify to promotion play-off in Divizia C.

=== Sibiu County ===
| Pos | Team | Pld | W | D | L | GF | GA | GD | Pts | Qualification or relegation |
|---|---|---|---|---|---|---|---|---|---|---|
| 1 | Construcții Sibiu (C, Q) | 34 | 21 | 8 | 5 | 69 | 33 | +36 | 50 | Qualification to promotion play-off |
| 2 | Textila Cisnădie | 34 | 21 | 7 | 6 | 73 | 26 | +47 | 48 (Note: Textila Cisnădie deducted 1 point.) | |
| 3 | Mecanica Sibiu | 34 | 17 | 10 | 7 | 65 | 22 | +43 | 44 | |
| 4 | Metalul IO Sibiu | 34 | 17 | 9 | 8 | 52 | 28 | +24 | 43 | |
| 5 | ITA-Geamuri Mediaș | 34 | 17 | 8 | 9 | 50 | 40 | +10 | 42 | |
| 6 | Avisib Cisnădie | 34 | 17 | 7 | 10 | 56 | 43 | +13 | 41 | |
| 7 | Vitrometan Mediaș | 34 | 14 | 8 | 12 | 42 | 33 | +9 | 36 | |
| 8 | Automecanica Mediaș | 34 | 15 | 6 | 13 | 50 | 47 | +3 | 36 | |
| 9 | Record Mediaș | 34 | 10 | 12 | 12 | 40 | 52 | −12 | 32 | |
| 10 | Firul Roșu Tălmaciu | 34 | 13 | 6 | 15 | 48 | 64 | −16 | 32 | |
| 11 | Carbomet Copșa Mică | 34 | 11 | 9 | 14 | 46 | 33 | +13 | 31 | |
| 12 | Sparta Mediaș | 34 | 12 | 7 | 15 | 41 | 41 | 0 | 31 | |
| 13 | CFR Sibiu | 34 | 11 | 9 | 14 | 40 | 45 | −5 | 31 | |
| 14 | Relee Mediaș | 34 | 10 | 9 | 15 | 38 | 52 | −14 | 29 | |
| 15 | CSU Șoimii Sibiu | 34 | 10 | 8 | 16 | 32 | 41 | −9 | 28 | |
| 16 | Textila Mediaș | 34 | 10 | 5 | 19 | 32 | 64 | −32 | 25 | |
| 17 | Progresul Dumbrăveni | 34 | 9 | 5 | 20 | 39 | 80 | −41 | 23 | |
| 18 | Șantierul Sibiu | 34 | 2 | 5 | 27 | 18 | 87 | −69 | 9 | |

Rules for classification: 1) Points; 2) Goal difference; 3) Number of goals scored.
(C) Champions; (Q) Qualified for the phase indicated

=== Suceava County ===
Series I

| Pos | Team | Pld | W | D | L | GF | GA | GD | Pts | Qualification or relegation |
|---|---|---|---|---|---|---|---|---|---|---|
| 1 | Viitorul Câmpulung Moldovenesc (Q) | 30 | 22 | 5 | 3 | 96 | 20 | +76 | 49 | Qualification to championship final |
| 2 | Fuiorul Cornu Luncii | 30 | 18 | 5 | 7 | 71 | 39 | +32 | 41 | |
| 3 | Filatura Fălticeni | 30 | 14 | 7 | 9 | 70 | 38 | +32 | 35 | |
| 4 | Victoria Solca | 30 | 13 | 7 | 10 | 82 | 50 | +32 | 33 | |
| 5 | Minerul Crucea | 30 | 14 | 4 | 12 | 85 | 44 | +41 | 32 | |
| 6 | Minerul Fundu Moldovei | 30 | 14 | 1 | 15 | 75 | 60 | +15 | 29 | |
| 7 | Minerul Iacobeni | 30 | 12 | 5 | 13 | 72 | 59 | +13 | 29 | |
| 8 | Victoria Păltinoasa | 30 | 13 | 3 | 14 | 60 | 63 | −3 | 29 | |
| 9 | Gloria Măzănăești | 30 | 13 | 2 | 15 | 64 | 79 | −15 | 28 | |
| 10 | Recolta Pârteștii de Jos | 30 | 12 | 4 | 14 | 59 | 77 | −18 | 28 | |
| 11 | Foresta Râșca | 30 | 12 | 2 | 16 | 60 | 65 | −5 | 26 | |
| 12 | Bistrița Broșteni | 30 | 8 | 10 | 12 | 46 | 76 | −30 | 26 | |
| 13 | Foresta Moldovița | 30 | 11 | 3 | 16 | 37 | 73 | −36 | 25 | |
| 14 | Sportul Muncitoresc Pojorâta | 30 | 10 | 5 | 15 | 59 | 96 | −37 | 25 | |
| 15 | Unirea Horodnic | 30 | 12 | 1 | 17 | 75 | 125 | −50 | 25 | |
| 16 | Bradul Vama | 30 | 7 | 6 | 17 | 37 | 73 | −36 | 20 | |

(Q) Qualified for the phase indicated

Series II

| Pos | Team | Pld | W | D | L | GF | GA | GD | Pts | Qualification or relegation |
|---|---|---|---|---|---|---|---|---|---|---|
| 1 | Sportul Muncitoresc Suceava (Q) | 30 | 22 | 4 | 4 | 91 | 22 | +69 | 48 | Qualification to championship final |
| 2 | Avântul Bădeuți | 30 | 22 | 3 | 5 | 101 | 24 | +77 | 47 | |
| 3 | Avântul Todirești | 30 | 16 | 5 | 9 | 104 | 40 | +64 | 37 | |
| 4 | Constructorul Dărmănești | 30 | 17 | 0 | 13 | 66 | 53 | +13 | 34 | |
| 5 | Recolta Fântânele | 30 | 15 | 3 | 12 | 96 | 61 | +35 | 33 | |
| 6 | Dumbrava Dumbrăveni | 30 | 14 | 5 | 11 | 60 | 40 | +20 | 33 | |
| 7 | Unirea Iacobești | 30 | 15 | 2 | 13 | 68 | 43 | +25 | 32 | |
| 8 | Locomotiva Dornești | 30 | 14 | 4 | 12 | 46 | 40 | +6 | 32 | |
| 9 | Bucovina Calafindești | 30 | 10 | 6 | 14 | 61 | 74 | −13 | 26 | |
| 10 | Viitorul Verești | 30 | 10 | 4 | 16 | 45 | 61 | −16 | 24 | |
| 11 | Progresul Milișăuți | 30 | 12 | 0 | 18 | 41 | 81 | −40 | 24 | |
| 12 | Avântul Grămești | 30 | 10 | 4 | 16 | 40 | 82 | −42 | 24 | |
| 13 | Siretul Dolhasca | 30 | 10 | 3 | 17 | 44 | 96 | −52 | 23 | |
| 14 | Viitorul Arbore | 30 | 11 | 1 | 18 | 35 | 90 | −55 | 23 | |
| 15 | Recolta Bosanci | 30 | 10 | 2 | 18 | 47 | 84 | −37 | 22 | |
| 16 | Recolta Volovăț | 30 | 8 | 2 | 20 | 40 | 91 | −51 | 18 | |

(Q) Qualified for the phase indicated

Championship final

The matches were played on 10 and 17 June 1984.

| Team 1 | Agg. | Team 2 | 1st leg | 2nd leg |
|---|---|---|---|---|
| Sportul Muncitoresc Suceava | 1–4 | Viitorul Câmpulung Moldovenesc | 1–2 | 0–2 |

Viitorul Câmpulung Moldovenesc won the Suceava County Championship and qualified for the promotion play-off to Divizia C.

== See also ==
- 1983–84 Divizia A
- 1983–84 Divizia B
- 1983–84 Divizia C
- 1983–84 Cupa României
