= Ohaba (Secaș) =

- Location within Romania

Location
- Country: Romania
- Counties: Alba County
- Villages: Ohaba

Physical characteristics
- Mouth: Secaș
  - location: Secășel
  - coordinates: 46.0876°N 23.8256°E
- Length: 10 km (6.2 mi)
- Basin size: 18 km^{2} (6.9 sq mi)

Basin features
- Progression: Secaș→ Târnava→ Mureș→ Tisza→ Danube→ Black Sea

The Ohaba is a left tributary of the river Secaș in Romania. It discharges into the Secaș in Secășel. Its length is 10 km (6.2 mi) and its basin size is 18 km^{2} (6.9 sq mi).
