= Crăciunelu de Jos =

- Commune
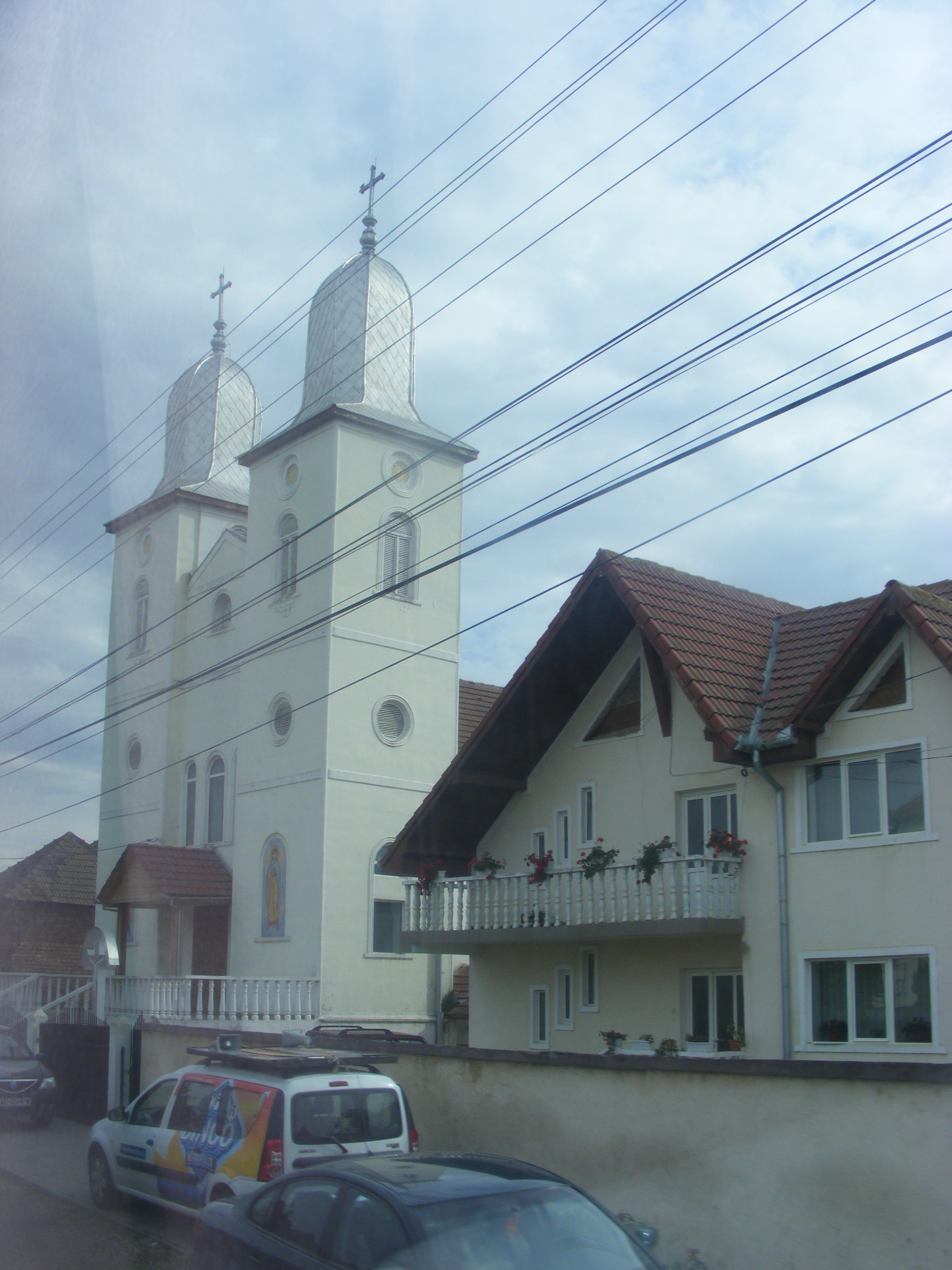
- Greek-Catholic church

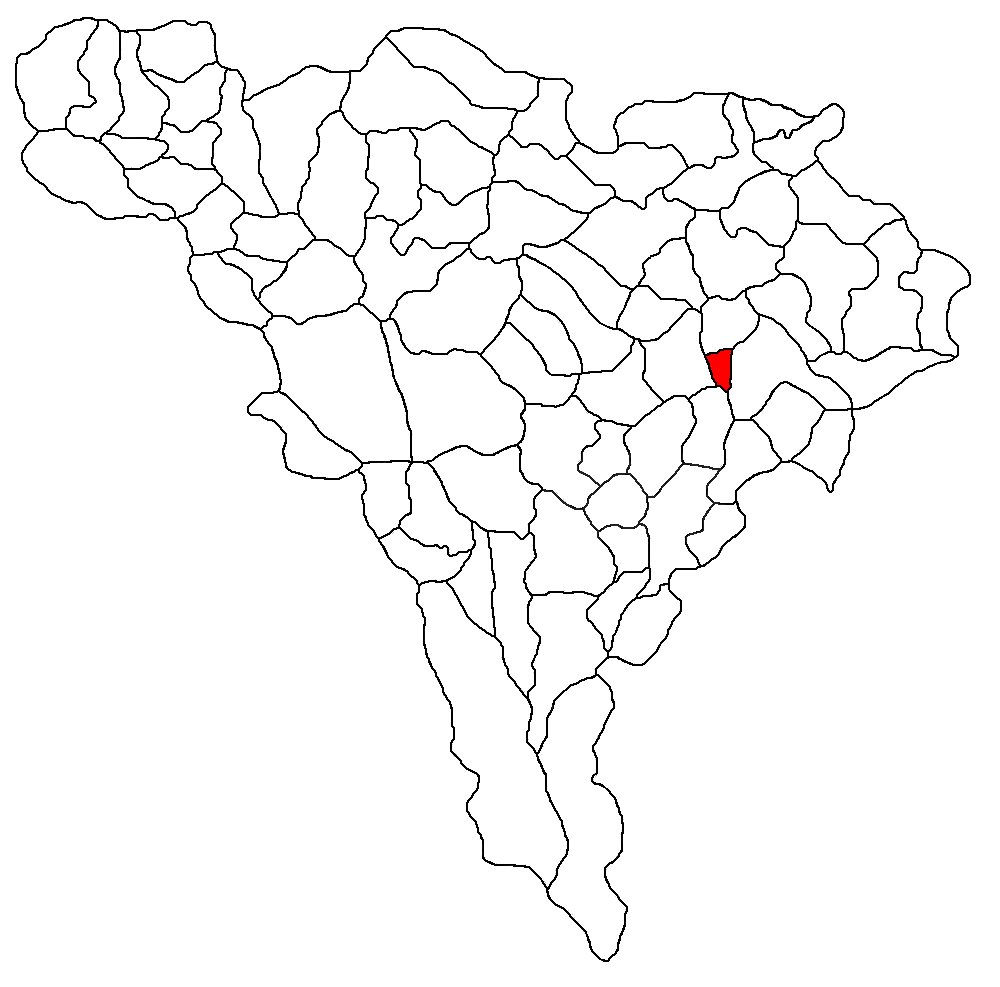
- Location in Alba County

- Location in Romania
- Coordinates: 46°11′N 23°50′E
- Country: Romania
- County: Alba

Government
  - Mayor (2020–2024): Lenuța Bubur (PNL)
- Area: 25.43 km^{2} (9.82 sq mi)
- Elevation: 240 m (790 ft)
- Population (2021-12-01): 1,954
  - Density: 76.84/km^{2} (199.0/sq mi)
- Time zone: UTC+02:00 (EET)
  - Summer (DST): UTC+03:00 (EEST)
- Postal code: 517260
- Area code: (+40) 02 58
- Vehicle reg.: AB
- Website: www.craciuneludejos.ro

Crăciunelu de Jos (German: Christendorf, Hungarian: Alsókarácsonfalva) is a commune located in the eastern part of Alba County, Transylvania, Romania. It has a population of 1,954 as of 2021. It is composed of a single village, Crăciunelu de Jos. It also included four other villages until 2006, when they were split off to form Bucerdea Grânoasă Commune.

The commune is situated on the right bank of the Târnava River, on the western side of the Transylvanian Plateau. It lies at a distance of 7.7 km (4.8 mi) from Blaj, 16.3 km (10.1 mi) from Teiuș, and 27.5 km (17.1 mi) from the county seat, Alba Iulia; it is traversed by the national road DN14B which joins Blaj (to the east) to Teiuș (to the west). There is also a train station that serves Line 300 of the CFR network, which runs from Bucharest to Blaj to Teiuș and then on towards the Hungarian border.

Historical population
Year	Pop.	±%
1850	805	—
1900	1,223	+51.9%
1930	1,666	+36.2%
1966	1,995	+19.7%
2002	2,092	+4.9%
2011	1,954	−6.6%
2021	1,954	+0.0%
Source: INS, Census data
