= Bucerdea Grânoasă =

Bucerdea Grânoasă Buzásbocsárd
- Commune
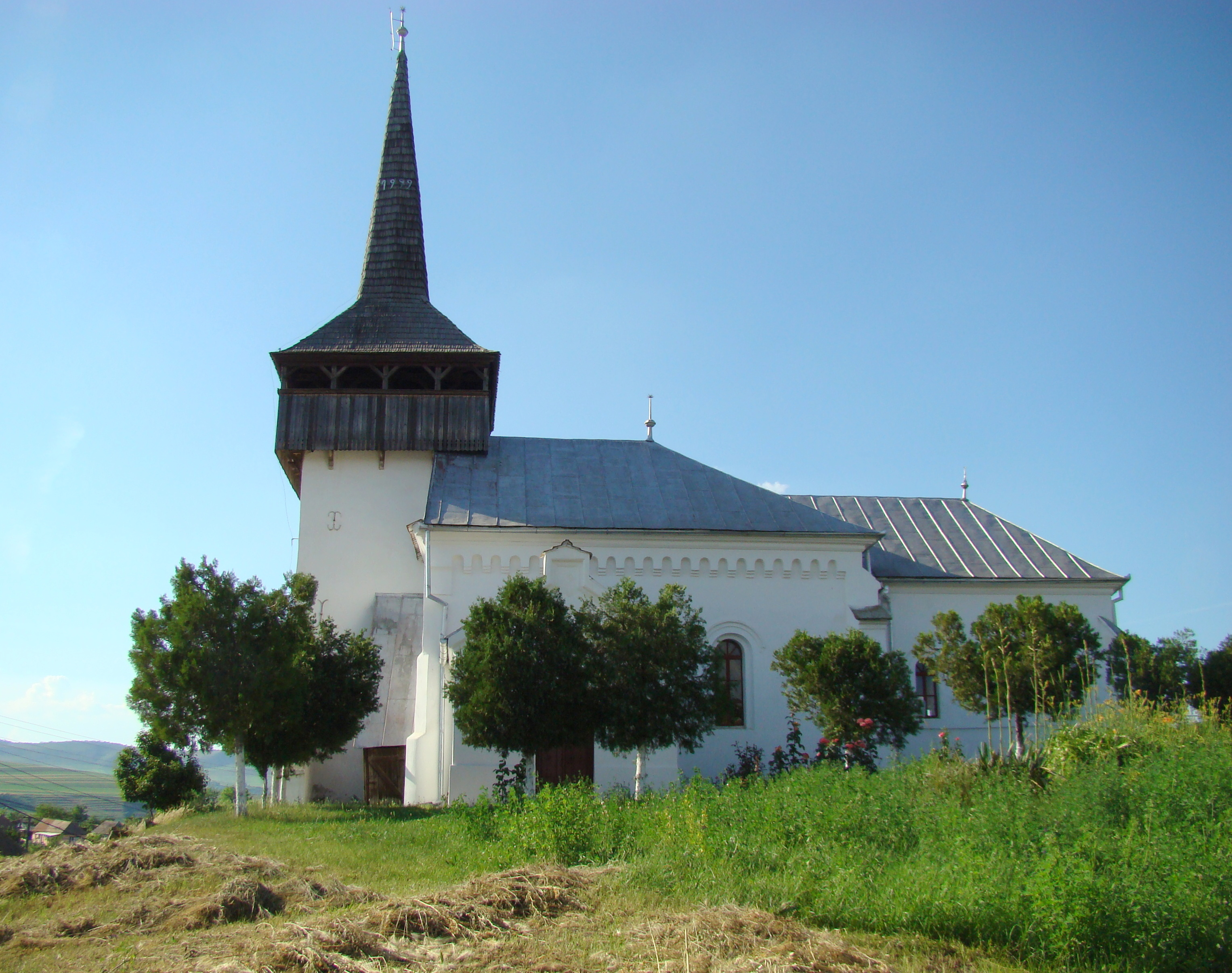
- Reformed church in Bucerdea Grânoasă

- Coat of arms

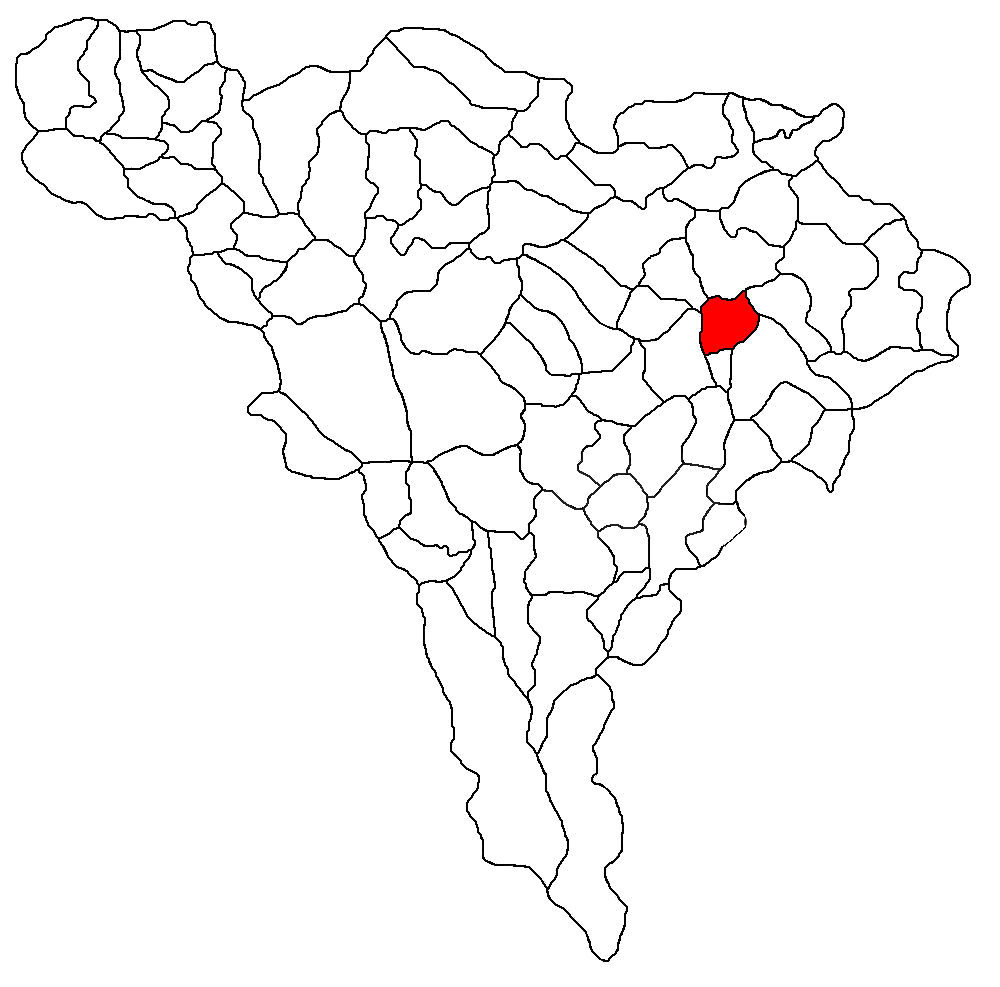
- Location in Alba County

- Location in Romania
- Coordinates: 46°11′29″N 23°50′16″E
- Country: Romania
- County: Alba

Government
  - Mayor (2020–2024): Ioan Aldea (PNL)
- Area: 41.3 km^{2} (15.9 sq mi)
- Elevation: 296 m (971 ft)
- Population (2021-12-01): 2,169
  - Density: 52.5/km^{2} (136/sq mi)
- Time zone: UTC+02:00 (EET)
  - Summer (DST): UTC+03:00 (EEST)
- Postal code: 517261
- Area code: (+40) 02 58
- Vehicle reg.: AB
- Website: bucerdea-granoasa.ro

Bucerdea Grânoasă (German: Burhardsdorf; Hungarian: Búzásbocsárd) is a commune located in Alba County, Transylvania, Romania. It has a population of 2,169 (as of 2021). It is composed of four villages: Bucerdea Grânoasă, Cornu (Kornujalja), Pădure (Székelyhegytanya), and Pânca. These were part of Crăciunelu de Jos Commune until 2006, when they were split off.

The commune is located in the southeastern corner of the Transylvanian Plateau, about 3 km (1.9 mi) north of the Târnava River and 10 km (6.2 mi) west of Blaj.

The Bucerdea Grânoasă train station serves Line 300 of the CFR network, which runs from Bucharest to Blaj to Teiuș and then towards the Hungarian border. A rail crash occurred here in the morning of October 7, 1968: due to a signalman's error, a fast passenger train collided head-on with a local train; 22 people were killed, and 72 seriously injured. This was Romania's second railway accident in number of victims after the Ciurea rail disaster of 1917.

Historical population
| Year | Pop. | ±% |
|---|---|---|
| 1850 | 1,506 | — |
| 1910 | 1,828 | +21.4% |
| 1966 | 2,542 | +39.1% |
| 2002 | 2,300 | −9.5% |
| 2011 | 2,235 | −2.8% |
| 2021 | 2,169 | −3.0% |
Source: INS, Census data
