= Călin Cristea =

Romanian footballer

Personal information
- Full name: Călin Virgil Cristea
- Date of birth: 6 May 1988 (age 38)
- Place of birth: Alba Iulia, Romania
- Height: 1.77 m (5 ft 9 1/2 in)
- Position: Left midfielder

Team information
- Current team: CIL Blaj
- Number: 12

Youth career
- 1998–2002: Rival Alba Iulia
- 2002–2004: Apullum Alba Iulia

Senior career*
Years	Team	Apps	(Gls)
2004–2010	Unirea Alba Iulia	149	(17)
2004	→ Minaur Zlatna (loan)	7	(0)
2011–2014	Pandurii Târgu Jiu	50	(2)
2014	FC Brașov	2	(0)
2015	Othellos Athienou	13	(1)
2016	Racing Beirut	10	(0)
2016	Râmnicu Vâlcea	18	(1)
2017–2018	Dunărea Călărași	30	(4)
2018	Energeticianul	19	(0)
2019	Oțelul Galați	?	(?)
2019–2020	CSM Reșița	21	(1)
2020–2021	FC U Craiova	17	(2)
2021–2022	CSM Reșița	15	(1)
2022–2024	Unirea Alba Iulia	43	(3)
2024–	CIL Blaj	15	(1)

International career
2006–2007	Romania U19	4	(0)
2009–2010	Romania U21	3	(0)
- * Club domestic league appearances and goals as of 10:35, 8 November 2024 (UTC)

Călin Virgil Cristea (born 6 May 1988) is a Romanian footballer who plays as a midfielder for CIL Blaj.

== Honours ==
Unirea Alba Iulia

- Liga II: 2008–09

Dunărea Călărași

- Liga II: 2017–18

FC U Craiova 1948

- Liga II: 2020–21

CSM Reșița

- Liga III: 2021–22
