= Secaș (Târnava) =

River in Sibiu and Alba, Romania

- Location within Romania

Location
- Country: Romania
- Counties: Sibiu, Alba
- Villages: Broșteni, Roșia de Secaș, Tău, Secășel, Colibi

Physical characteristics
- Mouth: Târnava
  - coordinates: 46.1756°N 23.7870°E
- Length: 37 km (23 mi)
- Basin size: 350 km^{2} (140 sq mi)

Basin features
- Progression: Târnava→ Mureș→ Tisza→ Danube→ Black Sea

The Secaș (also: Secașul Mic) is a left tributary of the river Târnava in Romania. It discharges into the Târnava in Obreja. Its length is 37 km (23 mi) and its basin size is 350 km^{2} (140 sq mi).

== Tributaries ==
The following rivers are tributaries to the river Secaș (from source to mouth):

- Left: Lunca Satului, Valea Pustie, Trecătoarea, Valea Hăncii, Păuca, Gârdan, Ungurei, Valea lui Sânui, Bolânda, Ohaba, Gârbău, Valea Seacă, Henig, Valea Largă
