= 1969–70 County Championship =

28th season of the Liga IV, the fourth tier of the Romanian football league

Liga IV
- Season: 1969–70

The 1969–70 County Championship was the 28th season of the Liga IV, the fourth tier of the Romanian football league system. The champions of each county association play against one from a neighboring county in a play-off to gain promotion to Divizia C.

== County championships ==
- Alba (AB)
- Arad (AR)
- Argeș (AG)
- Bacău (BC)
- Bihor (BH)
- Bistrița-Năsăud (BN)
- Botoșani (BT)
- Brașov (BV)
- Brăila (BR)
- Bucharest (B)
- Buzău (BZ)
- Caraș-Severin (CS)
- Cluj (CJ)
- Constanța (CT)
- Covasna (CV)
- Dâmbovița (DB)
- Dolj (DJ)
- Galați (GL)
- Gorj (GJ)
- Harghita (HR)
- Hunedoara (HD)
- Ialomița (IL)
- Iași (IS)
- Ilfov (IF)
- Maramureș (MM)
- Mehedinți (MH)
- Mureș (MS)
- Neamț (NT)
- Olt (OT)
- Prahova (PH)
- Satu Mare (SM)
- Sălaj (SJ)
- Sibiu (SB)
- Suceava (SV)
- Teleorman (TR)
- Timiș (TM)
- Tulcea (TL)
- Vaslui (VS)
- Vâlcea (VL)
- Vrancea (VN)

== Promotion play-off ==
First phase

The matches were played on 12, 19 and 22 July 1970.

Team 1	Series	Team 2	Game 1	Game 2	Game 3
Oituz Târgu Ocna (BC)	4–7	(SV) Avântul Rădăuți	2–0	0–2	2–5
Olimpia Râmnicu Sărat (BZ)	3–1	(GL) Dacia Galați	2–1	1–0	
Victoria Medgidia (CT)	1–2	(B) Constructorul București	0–0	1–2	
CFR Roșiori (TR)	0–4	(PH) Victoria Florești	0–1	0–3	
Minerul Moldova Nouă (CS)	10–1	(MH) Victoria Vânju Mare	7–1	3–0 (w/o)	
CFR Simeria (HD)	4–2	(TM) Șoimii Timișoara	3–1	1–1	
Cimentul Turda (CJ)	1–4	(MM) Minerul Baia Sprie	1–1	0–3	
Progresul Sibiu (SB)	1–2	(BV) ICIM Brașov	1–0	0–1	0–1

Second phase

The matches were played on 26, 29 July and 2 August 1970.

Team 1	Series	Team 2	Game 1	Game 2	Game 3
Avântul Rădăuți (SV)	3–5	(NT) Cimentul Bicaz	2–2	1–3	
ITA Pașcani (IS)	8–0	(BT) Unirea Săveni	5–0	3–0 (w/o)	
Viitorul Vaslui (VS)	0–1	(BZ) Olimpia Râmnicu Sărat	0–0	0–1	
Chimica Mărășești (VN)	3–5	(BR) Unirea Tricolor Brăila	2–1	0–1	1–3
Constructorul București (B)	3–5	(TL) Vulturul Tulcea	3–2	0–3	
Energia Slobozia (IL)	2–1	(IF) ITA București	0–0	2–1	
Victoria Florești (PH)	5–2	(AG) Rapid Pitești	2–0	3–2	
Metalul Mija (DB)	2–4	(OT) FC Caracal	1–2	1–2	
Minerul Moldova Nouă (CS)	3–0	(GJ) CIL Târgu Jiu	2–0	1–0	
Lotru Brezoi (VL)	2–1	(DJ) Autorapid Craiova	2–0	0–1	
Minerul Bihor (BH)	2–3	(HD) CFR Simeria	1–0	0–1	1–2
Gloria Arad (AR)	1–2	(AB) Unirea Alba Iulia	1–0	0–2	
Măgura Șimleu Silvaniei (SJ)	1–4	(MM) Minerul Baia Sprie	1–1	0–3	
Spartac Satu Mare (SM)	2–6	(BN) Someșul Beclean	2–2	0–4	
CFR Sighișoara (MS)	2–2 (Note: CFR Sighișoara was promoted by drawing lots.)	(BV) ICIM Brașov	0–0	0–0	2–2
Minerul Miercurea Ciuc (HR)	1–5	(CV) Forestierul Târgu Secuiesc	1–3	0–2	

== Championships standings ==
=== Alba County ===
Pos	Team	Pld	W	D	L	GF	GA	GD	Pts	Qualification or relegation
1	Unirea Alba Iulia (C, Q)	24	19	1	4	92	16	+76	39	Qualification to promotion play-off
2	CIL Blaj	24	17	2	5	64	34	+30	36	
3	CFR Teiuș	24	16	2	6	75	32	+43	34	
4	Arieșul Câmpeni	24	16	1	7	46	27	+19	33	
5	Constructorul Alba Iulia	24	13	5	6	39	26	+13	31	
6	ASM Cugir	24	10	6	8	40	29	+11	26	
7	Minerul Roșia Montană	24	12	2	10	42	47	−5	26	
8	CFR Blaj	24	10	3	11	45	37	+8	23	
9	Olimpia Aiud	24	8	4	12	35	38	−3	20	
10	Textila Sebeș	24	7	4	13	37	45	−8	18	
11	Mureșul Vințu de Jos	24	5	3	16	24	74	−50	13	
12	CFR Războieni	24	3	3	18	19	88	−69	9	
13	Avântul Sebeș	24	1	2	21	11	76	−65	4	

Rules for classification: 1) Points; 2) Goal difference; 3) Number of goals scored.
(C) Champions; (Q) Qualified for the phase indicated

=== Arad County ===
Pos	Team	Pld	W	D	L	GF	GA	GD	Pts	Qualification or relegation
1	Gloria Arad (C, Q)	28	23	3	2	103	18	+85	49	Qualification to promotion play-off
2	Teba Arad	28	19	6	3	76	18	+58	44	
3	Victoria Ineu	28	17	5	6	59	30	+29	39	
4	Unirea Arad	28	14	5	9	59	41	+18	33	
5	Libertatea Arad	28	11	8	9	64	48	+16	30	
6	Crișana Sebiș	28	10	9	9	41	41	0	29	
7	Progresul Pecica	28	11	6	11	40	39	+1	28	
8	Șoimii Pâncota	28	11	6	11	46	47	−1	28	
9	Foresta Beliu	28	12	3	13	45	35	+10	27	
10	Victoria Ineu II	28	10	7	11	42	38	+4	27	
11	Stăruința Dorobanți	28	11	5	12	44	42	+2	27	
12	Mureșul Lipova	28	10	6	12	52	49	+3	26	
13	Victoria Chișineu-Criș	28	5	4	19	37	94	−57	14	
14	Frontiera Curtici	28	4	3	21	15	74	−59	11	
15	Unirea Gurahonț	28	2	4	22	22	131	−109	8	
16	Unirea Sântana (Note: Unirea Sântana was expelled from the championship after 3 rounds and all its results were canceled.) (R)	0	0	0	0	0	0	0	0	Expelled

Rules for classification: 1) Points; 2) Goal difference; 3) Number of goals scored.
(C) Champions; (Q) Qualified for the phase indicated; (R) Relegated

=== Argeș County ===
Pos	Team	Pld	W	D	L	GF	GA	GD	Pts	Qualification or relegation
1	Rapid Pitești (C, Q)	20	11	9	0	38	16	+22	31	Qualification to promotion play-off
2	Textilistul Pitești	20	13	3	4	50	22	+28	29	
3	Avântul Curtea de Argeș	20	11	6	3	52	25	+27	28	
4	Forestierul Stâlpeni	20	11	4	5	50	23	+27	26	
5	ASA Pitești	20	7	10	3	33	25	+8	24	
6	Progresul Topoloveni	20	9	4	7	44	34	+10	22	
7	Petrolul Pitești	20	7	4	9	31	37	−6	18	
8	Unirea Costești	20	7	3	10	27	37	−10	17	
9	Avântul Rucăr	20	6	5	9	40	55	−15	17	
10	Tablierul Pitești	20	1	2	17	17	62	−45	4	
11	Textila Cetățeni	20	1	2	17	7	53	−46	4	

Rules for classification: 1) Points; 2) Goal difference; 3) Number of goals scored.
(C) Champions; (Q) Qualified for the phase indicated

=== Bacău County ===
Pos	Team	Pld	W	D	L	GF	GA	GD	Pts	Qualification or relegation
1	Oituz Târgu Ocna (C, Q)	22	14	3	5	53	21	+32	31	Qualification to promotion play-off
2	Energia Gheorghe Gheorghiu-Dej	22	11	6	5	39	26	+13	28	
3	Petrolistul Dărmănești	22	13	1	8	38	22	+16	27	
4	Gloria Zemeș	22	12	2	8	43	34	+9	26	
5	Partizanul Bacău	22	10	5	7	38	27	+11	25	
6	Moldova Buhuși	22	9	6	7	35	28	+7	24	
7	Constructorul Gheorghe Gheorghiu-Dej	22	10	4	8	33	33	0	24	
8	Bradul HCC Bacău	22	7	6	9	31	37	−6	20	
9	Unirea Tricolor Moinești	22	5	8	9	38	50	−12	18	
10	Foresta Gheorghe Gheorghiu-Dej	22	7	3	12	28	38	−10	17	
11	Forestierul Agăș	22	7	3	12	32	45	−13	17	
12	Petrolul Gheorghe Gheorghiu-Dej	22	1	5	16	14	61	−47	7	

Rules for classification: 1) Points; 2) Goal difference; 3) Number of goals scored.
(C) Champions; (Q) Qualified for the phase indicated

=== Bihor County ===
Pos	Team	Pld	W	D	L	GF	GA	GD	Pts	Qualification or relegation
1	Minerul Bihor (C, Q)	26	18	7	1	82	19	+63	43	Qualification to promotion play-off
2	Metalul Oradea	26	17	6	3	58	24	+34	40	
3	Bihorul Beiuș	26	15	5	6	55	26	+29	35	
4	Recolta Valea lui Mihai	26	13	6	7	53	32	+21	32	
5	Minerul Voivozi	26	14	2	10	48	40	+8	30	
6	Petrolul Suplac	26	12	2	12	47	42	+5	26	
7	Voința Oradea	26	10	4	12	56	42	+14	24	
8	Stăruința Săcuieni	26	9	6	11	60	54	+6	24	
9	Oțelul Bihor	26	9	6	11	41	56	−15	24	
10	Înfrățirea Oradea	26	10	3	13	52	42	+10	23	
11	Minerul Șuncuiuș	26	7	7	12	25	48	−23	21	
12	Stăruința Aleșd	26	7	5	14	22	50	−28	19	
13	Foresta Tileagd	26	8	2	16	35	40	−5	18	
14	Crișana Tinca	26	1	3	22	17	127	−110	5	

Rules for classification: 1) Points; 2) Goal difference; 3) Number of goals scored.
(C) Champions; (Q) Qualified for the phase indicated

=== Bistrița-Năsăud County ===
Pos	Team	Pld	W	D	L	GF	GA	GD	Pts	Qualification or relegation
1	Someșul Beclean (C, Q)	20	13	6	1	70	25	+45	32	Qualification to promotion play-off
2	Foresta Susenii Bârgăului	20	12	1	7	52	27	+25	25	
3	Viticola Dumitra	20	10	2	8	45	28	+17	22	
4	Minerul Rodna	20	10	1	9	36	42	−6	21	
5	Bradul Telciu	20	8	3	9	50	40	+10	19	
6	Hebe Sângeorz-Băi	20	8	3	9	45	40	+5	19	
7	Victoria Uriu	20	8	3	9	30	39	−9	19	
8	Hârtia Prundu Bârgăului	20	9	0	11	32	30	+2	18	
9	Steaua Nimigea	20	8	2	10	47	62	−15	18	
10	Someșul Reteag	20	7	0	13	26	69	−43	14	
11	Someșul Rebrișoara	20	6	1	13	28	58	−30	13	

Rules for classification: 1) Points; 2) Goal difference; 3) Number of goals scored.
(C) Champions; (Q) Qualified for the phase indicated

=== Botoșani County ===
Pos	Team	Pld	W	D	L	GF	GA	GD	Pts	Qualification or relegation
1	Unirea Săveni (C, Q)	14	11	2	1	56	9	+47	24	Qualification to promotion play-off
2	Victoria PTTR Botoșani	14	11	1	2	54	14	+40	23	
3	Siretul Bucecea	14	7	2	5	29	22	+7	16	
4	Gloria Frumușica	14	6	3	5	21	20	+1	15	
5	Sănătatea Darabani	14	4	3	7	32	41	−9	11	
6	Victoria Coțusca	14	5	0	9	29	55	−26	10	
7	Victoria Nicolae Bălcescu	14	3	2	9	13	37	−24	8	
8	Rapid Ungureni	14	2	1	11	13	49	−36	5	

Rules for classification: 1) Points; 2) Goal difference; 3) Number of goals scored.
(C) Champions; (Q) Qualified for the phase indicated

=== Brașov County ===
Pos	Team	Pld	W	D	L	GF	GA	GD	Pts	Qualification or relegation
1	ICIM Brașov (C, Q)	26	22	1	3	69	14	+55	45	Qualification to promotion play-off
2	Politehnica Brașov	26	18	3	5	74	22	+52	39	
3	Textila Prejmer	26	16	4	6	55	23	+32	36	
4	Precizia Săcele	26	15	4	7	42	21	+21	34	
5	Prefabricate Brașov	26	15	4	7	34	28	+6	34	
6	Măgura Codlea	26	13	4	9	40	29	+11	30	
7	CFR Brașov	26	10	5	11	33	33	0	25	
8	Celuloza Zărnești	26	10	5	11	35	39	−4	25	
9	Hidromecanica Brașov	26	7	7	12	26	34	−8	21	
10	Ceramica Feldioara	26	8	2	16	32	62	−30	18	
11	Utilajul Făgăraș	26	5	7	14	28	37	−9	17	
12	Bazaltul Racoș	26	6	5	15	17	59	−42	17	
13	Olimpia Sânpetru	26	6	2	18	25	56	−31	14	
14	Metalul Brașov	26	3	3	20	8	61	−53	9	

Rules for classification: 1) Points; 2) Goal difference; 3) Number of goals scored.
(C) Champions; (Q) Qualified for the phase indicated

=== Brăila County ===
Pos	Team	Pld	W	D	L	GF	GA	GD	Pts	Promotion or relegation
1	Unirea Tricolor Brăila (C, Q)	20	18	0	2	68	11	+57	36	Qualification to promotion play-off
2	Unirea TUG Brăila	20	14	3	3	47	18	+29	31	
3	Tractorul Viziru	20	14	3	3	42	17	+25	31	
4	Dacia IDD Brăila	20	9	4	7	36	22	+14	22	
5	Marina Brăila	20	7	6	7	32	25	+7	20	
6	Comerțul Brăila	20	5	5	10	25	42	−17	15	
7	Gloria ITO Brăila	20	6	3	11	24	48	−24	15	
8	Rapid CFR Brăila	20	5	4	11	19	33	−14	14	
9	Avântul Chiscani	20	3	8	9	22	50	−28	14	
10	Olimpia Făurei	20	5	2	13	29	52	−23	12	
11	Mecanizatorul Ianca	20	4	2	14	22	48	−26	10	

Rules for classification: 1) Points; 2) Goal difference; 3) Number of goals scored.
(C) Champions; (Q) Qualified for the phase indicated

=== Bucharest ===
Pos	Team	Pld	W	D	L	GF	GA	GD	Pts	Qualification or relegation
1	Constructorul București (C, Q)	30	15	11	4	52	32	+20	41	Qualification to promotion play-off
2	Granitul București	30	15	8	7	38	29	+9	38	
3	IOR București	30	11	13	6	37	21	+16	35	
4	Agronomia București	30	13	8	9	31	27	+4	34	
5	Automatica București	30	9	15	6	30	25	+5	33	
6	Dinamo Obor București	30	12	7	11	34	29	+5	31	
7	Armata București	30	12	7	11	36	34	+2	31	
8	Vâscoza București	30	8	13	9	33	30	+3	29	
9	ICSIM București	30	11	7	12	30	29	+1	29	
10	Bere Rahova	30	9	10	11	43	45	−2	28	
11	Avântul 9 Mai	30	9	10	11	24	35	−11	28	
12	Acumulatorul București	30	10	6	14	33	39	−6	26	
13	IPROFIL București	30	8	10	12	29	35	−6	26	
14	Gloria București	30	8	10	12	30	38	−8	26	
15	Metaloglobus București (R)	30	8	9	13	30	45	−15	25	Relegation to Bucharest Championship II
16	ITB București (R)	30	5	10	15	24	41	−17	20	Relegation to Bucharest Championship II

Rules for classification: 1) Points; 2) Goal difference; 3) Number of goals scored.
(C) Champions; (Q) Qualified for the phase indicated; (R) Relegated

=== Buzău County ===
Pos	Team	Pld	W	D	L	GF	GA	GD	Pts	Qualification or relegation
1	Olimpia Râmnicu Sărat (C, Q)	28	22	5	1	109	15	+94	49	Qualification to promotion play-off
2	Chimia Buzău	28	23	2	3	91	26	+65	48	
3	Foresta Nehoiu	28	21	5	2	111	19	+92	47	
4	Automobilul Buzău	28	16	4	8	64	33	+31	36	
5	Viitorul Rușețu	28	11	4	13	50	52	−2	26	
6	Ceramica Buzău	28	11	4	13	48	59	−11	26	
7	Recolta Blăjani	28	11	2	15	42	50	−8	24	
8	Recolta Ziduri	28	10	4	14	40	75	−35	24	
9	Foresta Vernești	28	11	1	16	55	56	−1	23	
10	Spartac Poșta Câlnau	28	9	5	14	42	64	−22	23	
11	Pinul Nehoiu	28	9	4	15	34	72	−38	22	
12	Partizanul Monteoru	28	7	6	15	38	74	−36	20	
13	Progresul Pătârlagele	28	7	4	17	41	83	−42	18	
14	Steaua Roșie Buzău	28	6	6	16	41	58	−17	18	
15	Zahărul Buzău	28	7	0	21	32	98	−66	14	

Rules for classification: 1) Points; 2) Goal difference; 3) Number of goals scored.
(C) Champions; (Q) Qualified for the phase indicated

=== Caraș-Severin County ===
Pos	Team	Pld	W	D	L	GF	GA	GD	Pts	Qualification or relegation
1	Minerul Moldova Nouă (C, Q)	30	22	5	3	88	21	+67	49	Qualification to promotion play-off
2	Minerul Oravița	30	18	6	6	79	31	+48	42	
3	Minerul Dognecea	30	17	7	6	57	36	+21	41	
4	Metalul Bocșa	30	16	8	6	68	27	+41	40	
5	Metalul Oțelu Roșu	30	16	6	8	82	42	+40	38	
6	Muncitorul Reșița	30	14	8	8	60	44	+16	36	
7	Foresta Zăvoi	30	12	8	10	47	47	0	32	
8	Nera Bozovici	30	14	3	13	69	65	+4	31	
9	Minerul Ocna de Fier	30	13	5	12	50	52	−2	31	
10	CFR IRTA Oravița	30	10	6	14	40	48	−8	26	
11	Electrica Reșița	30	8	8	14	37	52	−15	24	
12	Bistra Glimboca	30	8	7	15	35	74	−39	23	
13	Siderurgistul Reșița	30	9	4	17	38	55	−17	22	
14	Energia Reșița	30	7	5	18	37	69	−32	19	
15	Progresul Băile Herculane (R)	30	7	5	18	35	87	−52	19	Relegation to Caraș-Severin County Championship II
16	CIL Caransebeș (R)	30	1	5	24	13	85	−72	7	Relegation to Caraș-Severin County Championship II

Rules for classification: 1) Points; 2) Goal difference; 3) Number of goals scored.
(C) Champions; (Q) Qualified for the phase indicated; (R) Relegated

=== Cluj County ===
Pos	Team	Pld	W	D	L	GF	GA	GD	Pts	Qualification or relegation
1	Cimentul Turda (C, Q)	26	19	3	4	60	16	+44	41	Qualification to promotion play-off
2	Locomotiva 16 Februarie Cluj-Napoca	26	18	5	3	56	19	+37	41	
3	CFR Dej	26	16	2	8	45	36	+9	34	
4	Flacăra Cluj-Napoca	26	14	4	8	57	45	+12	32	
5	Vlădeasa Huedin	26	13	5	8	49	31	+18	31	
6	Motorul IRA Cluj-Napoca	26	12	7	7	43	30	+13	31	
7	Unirea Cluj-Napoca	26	12	3	11	34	31	+3	27	
8	Izolatorul Turda	26	7	9	10	39	41	−2	23	
9	IOTC Cluj-Napoca	26	6	10	10	42	46	−4	22	
10	Electrometal Cluj-Napoca	26	9	4	13	45	55	−10	22	
11	Carbochim Cluj-Napoca	26	8	3	15	26	51	−25	19	
12	Caolina Aghireș	26	6	3	17	37	59	−22	15	
13	Vulturul Mintiu Gherlii	26	5	5	16	35	79	−44	15	
14	Politehnica Cluj-Napoca	26	4	3	19	22	60	−38	11	

Rules for classification: 1) Points; 2) Goal difference; 3) Number of goals scored.
(C) Champions; (Q) Qualified for the phase indicated

=== Constanța County ===
Pos	Team	Pld	W	D	L	GF	GA	GD	Pts	Qualification or relegation
1	Victoria Medgidia (C, Q)	28	16	6	6	52	23	+29	38	Qualification to promotion play-off
2	Știința Constanța	28	15	7	6	50	21	+29	37	
3	Metalul Mangalia	28	14	8	6	45	23	+22	36	
4	Victoria Saligny	28	14	6	8	41	29	+12	34	
5	Petrolul Constanța	28	13	8	7	43	31	+12	34	
6	Tractorul Chirnogeni	28	11	10	7	41	28	+13	32	
7	Voința Constanța	28	13	5	10	37	26	+11	31	
8	Chimia Năvodari	28	11	8	9	35	33	+2	30	
9	Olimpia Constanța	28	10	7	11	48	53	−5	27	
10	Ideal Cernavodă	28	12	3	13	43	50	−7	27	
11	Șantierul Naval Constanța	28	9	8	11	45	37	+8	26	
12	Recolta Negru Vodă	28	11	4	13	35	44	−9	26	
13	CFR Constanța	28	7	8	13	25	42	−17	22	
14	CFR Medgidia	28	5	8	15	28	46	−18	18	
15	Munca Ovidiu (Note: Munca Ovidiu was expelled after 16 rounds due to repeated no-shows and lost all remaining matches with 0–3.) (R)	28	1	0	27	15	97	−82	2	Relegation to Constanța County Championship II
16	Viitorul Constanța (Note: Viitorul Constanța expelled after 7 rounds and all its results were canceled.) (D)	0	0	0	0	0	0	0	0	Expelled

Rules for classification: 1) Points; 2) Goal difference; 3) Number of goals scored.
(C) Champions; (D) Disqualified; (Q) Qualified for the phase indicated; (R) Relegated

=== Covasna County ===
Pos	Team	Pld	W	D	L	GF	GA	GD	Pts	Qualification or relegation
1	Forestierul Târgu Secuiesc (C, Q)	24	22	2	0	122	11	+111	46	Qualification to promotion play-off
2	Carpați Covasna	24	16	5	3	88	25	+63	37	
3	Unirea Sfantu Gheorghe	24	14	5	5	77	38	+39	33	
4	Minerul Baraolt	24	14	2	8	71	42	+29	30	
5	Venus Ozun	24	10	5	9	45	45	0	25	
6	Unirea Reci	24	10	2	12	59	68	−9	22	
7	Oltul Coșeni	24	9	4	11	33	43	−10	22	
8	Progresul Catalina	24	9	2	13	70	61	+9	20	
9	Venus Zăbala	24	8	4	12	44	107	−63	20	
10	Izvorul Micfalău	24	8	1	15	46	80	−34	17	
11	Aprovizionarea Valea Crișului	24	7	2	15	40	71	−31	16	
12	Harghita Aita Mare	24	4	4	16	27	87	−60	12	
13	Oltul Chilieni	24	3	4	17	27	71	−44	10	

Rules for classification: 1) Points; 2) Goal difference; 3) Number of goals scored.
(C) Champions; (Q) Qualified for the phase indicated

=== Dâmbovița County ===
Pos	Team	Pld	W	D	L	GF	GA	GD	Pts	Qualification or relegation
1	Metalul Mija (C, Q)	36	27	7	2	105	20	+85	61	Qualification to promotion play-off
2	Textila Pucioasa	36	21	6	9	69	35	+34	48	
3	Victoria Moreni	36	19	7	10	70	42	+28	45	
4	Cimentul Fieni	36	18	6	12	72	53	+19	42	
5	Viitorul Pucioasa	36	16	8	12	74	34	+40	40	
6	Turbina Doicești	36	14	6	16	60	74	−14	34	
7	Autobuzul Găești	36	14	5	17	57	56	+1	33	
8	Ciocanul Târgoviște	36	13	6	17	49	77	−28	32	
9	Bradul Moroeni	36	5	5	26	19	92	−73	15	
10	Minerul Șotânga	36	1	2	33	10	120	−110	4	

Rules for classification: 1) Points; 2) Goal difference; 3) Number of goals scored.
(C) Champions; (Q) Qualified for the phase indicated

=== Dolj County ===
Series I

Pos	Team	Pld	W	D	L	GF	GA	GD	Pts	Qualification or relegation
1	Autorapid Craiova (Q)	20	15	1	4	56	18	+38	31	Qualification to championship final
2	Progresul Băilești	20	13	2	5	53	28	+25	28	
3	Unirea Goicea Mare	20	12	2	6	63	24	+39	26	
4	Recolta Urzicuța	20	10	2	8	36	35	+1	22	
5	Metalul Craiova	20	8	4	8	42	30	+12	20	
6	Armata Craiova	20	9	1	10	41	31	+10	19	
7	Recolta Covei	20	7	2	11	32	38	−6	16	
8	Recolta Afumați	20	7	2	11	33	49	−16	16	
9	Avântul Rast	20	7	2	11	29	68	−39	16	
10	Fulgerul Maglavit	20	6	2	12	29	47	−18	14	
11	Voința Caraula	20	5	2	13	25	71	−46	12	
12	Drum nou Boureni (Note: Drum Nou Boureni withdrew after 11 rounds and all its results were canceled.) (D)	0	0	0	0	0	0	0	0	Withdrew

Rules for classification: 1) Points; 2) Goal difference; 3) Number of goals scored.
(D) Disqualified; (Q) Qualified for the phase indicated
Notes:

Series II

Pos	Team	Pld	W	D	L	GF	GA	GD	Pts	Qualification or relegation
1	Constructorul Craiova (Q)	22	15	5	2	47	8	+39	35	Qualification to championship final
2	Avântul Bârca	22	13	6	3	40	19	+21	32	
3	Dunărea Bistreț	22	12	4	6	49	29	+20	28	
4	Recolta Dăbuleni	22	10	7	5	54	43	+11	27	
5	Automobilul URA Craiova	22	11	5	6	32	23	+9	27	
6	Progresul Goicea Mică	22	11	4	7	45	21	+24	26	
7	Electrica Craiova	22	9	2	11	44	35	+9	20	
8	Progresul Segarcea	22	8	2	12	32	41	−9	18	
9	Tractorul Bechet	22	6	2	14	24	57	−33	14	
10	Medicina Craiova	22	5	3	14	23	53	−30	13	
11	Jiul Gângiova	22	6	1	15	28	63	−35	13	
12	Unirea Podari	22	4	3	15	24	50	−26	11	

Rules for classification: 1) Points; 2) Goal difference; 3) Number of goals scored.
(Q) Qualified for the phase indicated

Championship final

The matches were played on 31 May and 7 June 1970.

Team 1	Agg.	Team 2	1st leg	2nd leg
Constructorul Craiova	0–6 (Note: The initially results, Constructorul Craiova–Autorapid Craiova 3–1 and 0–0, was canceled after an appeal of Autorapid. Constructorul used a player without the right to play.)	Autorapid Craiova	0–3	0–3

Autorapid Craiova won the Dolj County Championship and qualify to promotion play-off in Divizia C.

=== Galați County ===
Pos	Team	Pld	W	D	L	GF	GA	GD	Pts	Qualification or relegation
1	Dacia Galați (C, Q)	24	20	2	2	99	12	+87	42	Qualification to promotion play-off
2	Tractorul Galați	24	18	3	3	79	19	+60	39	
3	Metalosport Galați	24	14	6	4	45	18	+27	34	
4	Gloria Tecuci	24	16	1	7	62	20	+42	33	
5	Mecanizatorul Târgu Bujor	24	13	4	7	78	35	+43	30	
6	Trefilorul Galați	24	11	2	11	40	55	−15	24	
7	Comerțul Galați	24	9	5	10	38	43	−5	23	
8	Victoria IGL Galați	24	8	4	12	38	60	−22	20	
9	Recolta Tudor Vladimirescu	24	7	4	13	21	41	−20	18	
10	Avântul Matca	24	7	0	17	34	60	−26	14	
11	Viitorul Berești	24	5	2	17	31	73	−42	12	
12	Tehnometal Galați	24	4	4	16	23	74	−51	12	
13	Avântul Valea Mărului	24	3	1	20	28	112	−84	7	

Rules for classification: 1) Points; 2) Goal difference; 3) Number of goals scored.
(C) Champions; (Q) Qualified for the phase indicated

=== Gorj County ===
Pos	Team	Pld	W	D	L	GF	GA	GD	Pts	Qualification or relegation
1	CIL Târgu Jiu (C, Q)	22	19	2	1	126	12	+114	40	Qualification to promotion play-off
2	Metalurgistul Sadu	22	18	4	0	112	13	+99	40	
3	Gorjul Târgu Jiu	22	12	5	5	66	34	+32	29	
4	Minerul Rovinari	22	13	1	8	80	36	+44	27	
5	IGCL Motru	22	9	6	7	49	39	+10	24	
6	Unirea Târgu Jiu	22	10	3	9	40	60	−20	23	
7	Petrolul Țicleni	22	9	2	11	44	62	−18	20	
8	Locomotiva Tismana	22	7	5	10	44	54	−10	19	
9	TCMM Rovinari	22	8	3	11	32	51	−19	19	
10	CSȘ Târgu Jiu	22	4	3	15	36	89	−53	11	
11	Voința Târgu Jiu	22	4	2	16	28	103	−75	10	
12	Unirea ILF Târgu Jiu	22	1	0	21	14	118	−104	2	

Rules for classification: 1) Points; 2) Goal difference; 3) Number of goals scored.
(C) Champions; (Q) Qualified for the phase indicated

=== Harghita County ===
Pos	Team	Pld	W	D	L	GF	GA	GD	Pts	Qualification or relegation
1	Minerul Miercurea Ciuc (C, Q)	16	12	2	2	50	14	+36	26	Qualification to promotion play-off
2	Apemin Borsec	16	11	3	2	58	22	+36	25	
3	Mureșul Toplița	16	12	1	3	38	11	+27	25	
4	Harghita Odorheiu Secuiesc	16	9	2	5	47	32	+15	20	
5	Minerul Chileni	16	8	1	7	38	34	+4	17	
6	Flamura Roșie Sânsimion	16	8	0	8	30	40	−10	16	
7	Metalul Vlăhița	16	3	1	12	24	55	−31	7	
8	Rapid Ciceu	16	2	1	13	11	42	−31	5	
9	Bastionul Lăzarea	16	1	3	12	16	62	−46	5	

Rules for classification: 1) Points; 2) Goal difference; 3) Number of goals scored.
(C) Champions; (Q) Qualified for the phase indicated

=== Hunedoara County ===
Pos	Team	Pld	W	D	L	GF	GA	GD	Pts	Qualification or relegation
1	CFR Simeria (C, Q)	20	13	5	2	64	20	+44	31	Qualification to promotion play-off
2	Constructorul Hunedoara	20	10	8	2	44	12	+32	28	
3	Energia Deva	20	8	7	5	31	33	−2	23	
4	Minerul Vulcan	20	10	2	8	40	33	+7	22	
5	Preparatorul Petrila	20	8	5	7	40	35	+5	21	
6	Dacia Orăștie	20	9	3	8	39	35	+4	21	
7	Constructorul Lupeni	20	10	1	9	34	34	0	21	
8	Parângul Lonea	20	8	4	8	35	31	+4	20	
9	Gloria Hațeg	20	5	5	10	18	36	−18	15	
10	Minerul Aninoasa	20	3	6	11	15	41	−26	12	
11	Energia Paroșeni	20	2	2	16	20	70	−50	6	
12	Minerul Uricani (Note: Minerul Uricani was expelled in the first part of the season and all its results were canceled.) (R)	0	0	0	0	0	0	0	0	Expelled

Rules for classification: 1) Points; 2) Goal difference; 3) Number of goals scored.
(C) Champions; (Q) Qualified for the phase indicated; (R) Relegated

=== Ialomița County ===
Pos	Team	Pld	W	D	L	GF	GA	GD	Pts	Qualification or relegation
1	Energia Slobozia (C, Q)	26	20	4	2	65	16	+49	44	Qualification to promotion play-off
2	Bărăganul Dragalina	26	15	7	4	61	29	+32	37	
3	Locomotiva Fetești	26	14	5	7	51	28	+23	33	
4	Olimpia Călărași	26	12	6	8	54	31	+23	30	
5	Căzănești	26	13	4	9	53	33	+20	30	
6	Victoria Lehliu	26	10	9	7	35	35	0	29	
7	Victoria Țăndărei	26	11	4	11	31	36	−5	26	
8	Steaua Lehliu	26	11	4	11	41	53	−12	26	
9	Uleiul Slobozia	26	10	4	12	47	49	−2	24	
10	Zarea Cuza Vodă	26	9	6	11	43	47	−4	24	
11	Avântul Dor Mărunt	26	8	7	11	36	42	−6	23	
12	Victoria Munteni-Buzău	26	10	3	13	43	52	−9	23	
13	Metalul Ciulnița	26	2	3	21	26	90	−64	7	
14	Confecția Călărași	26	2	2	22	14	58	−44	6	

Rules for classification: 1) Points; 2) Goal difference; 3) Number of goals scored.
(C) Champions; (Q) Qualified for the phase indicated

=== Iași County ===
Pos	Team	Pld	W	D	L	GF	GA	GD	Pts	Qualification or relegation
1	ITA Pașcani (C, Q)	16	9	5	2	57	21	+36	23	Qualification to promotion play-off
2	Siderurgistul Iași	16	9	2	5	38	18	+20	20	
3	Voința Iași	16	8	4	4	34	25	+9	20	
4	SCD Hălăucești	16	8	1	7	41	66	−25	17	
5	Constructorul Iași	16	6	4	6	30	25	+5	16	
6	Țesătura Iași	16	5	5	6	21	29	−8	15	
7	Viitorul Târgu Frumos	16	5	3	8	25	31	−6	13	
8	Recolta Ruginoasa	16	4	3	9	28	52	−24	11	
9	Recolta Podu Iloaiei	16	3	3	10	29	36	−7	9	

Rules for classification: 1) Points; 2) Goal difference; 3) Number of goals scored.
(C) Champions; (Q) Qualified for the phase indicated

=== Ilfov County ===
Pos	Team	Pld	W	D	L	GF	GA	GD	Pts	Qualification or relegation
1	ITA București (C, Q)	28	21	3	4	77	17	+60	45	Qualification to promotion play-off
2	Cinematografia Buftea	28	18	4	6	76	34	+42	40	
3	Aurora Urziceni	28	13	4	11	59	49	+10	30	
4	Avântul Cosoba	28	12	6	10	41	49	−8	30	
5	Porțelanul Dragomirești	28	12	5	11	60	54	+6	29	
6	Gloria Fundeni	28	11	5	12	36	46	−10	27	
7	Recolta Brezoaele	28	11	5	12	55	71	−16	27	
8	CFR Giurgiu	28	11	4	13	38	43	−5	26	
9	Unirea Gârbovi	28	12	2	14	44	58	−14	26	
10	Argeșul 30 Decembrie	28	11	3	14	68	63	+5	25	
11	Steaua Roșie Ulmeni	28	12	1	15	43	44	−1	25	
12	Stejarul Gruiu	28	10	5	13	40	48	−8	25	
13	Gloria Comana	28	8	6	14	46	56	−10	22	
14	Avântul Dridu (R)	28	9	4	15	39	76	−37	22	Relegation to Ilfov County Championship II
15	Șoimii ITU București (R)	28	9	3	16	41	55	−14	21	Relegation to Ilfov County Championship II
16	CAP Cornetu (Note: CAP Cornetu was expelled in the first part of the season and all its results were canceled.) (D)	0	0	0	0	0	0	0	0	Expelled

Rules for classification: 1) Points; 2) Goal difference; 3) Number of goals scored.
(C) Champions; (D) Disqualified; (Q) Qualified for the phase indicated; (R) Relegated

=== Maramureș County ===
Pos	Team	Pld	W	D	L	GF	GA	GD	Pts	Qualification or relegation
1	Minerul Baia Sprie (C, Q)	26	20	4	2	64	10	+54	44	Qualification to promotion play-off
2	Minerul Baia Borșa	26	20	3	3	65	16	+49	43	
3	Minerul Cavnic	26	19	4	3	68	13	+55	42	
4	Unirea Seini	26	11	6	9	48	32	+16	28	
5	Avântul Baia Mare	26	12	3	11	52	31	+21	27	
6	IRTA Târgu Lăpuș	26	12	2	12	37	37	0	26	
7	Tricoul Roșu Sighetu Marmației	26	12	1	13	28	42	−14	25	
8	Minerul Băița	26	9	5	12	38	50	−12	23	
9	CSU Baia Mare	26	8	6	12	35	54	−19	22	
10	Forestiera Câmpulung la Tisa	26	9	3	14	31	60	−29	21	
11	Minerul Băiuț	26	8	4	14	35	56	−21	20	
12	Voința Sighetu Marmației	26	8	4	14	33	50	−17	20	
13	Băimăreana Baia Mare	26	6	2	18	20	68	−48	14	
14	Victoria Baia Mare	26	3	3	20	15	50	−35	9	

Rules for classification: 1) Points; 2) Goal difference; 3) Number of goals scored.
(C) Champions; (Q) Qualified for the phase indicated

=== Mehedinți County ===
Pos	Team	Pld	W	D	L	GF	GA	GD	Pts	Qualification or relegation
1	Victoria Vânju Mare (C, Q)	18	18	0	0	61	15	+46	36	Qualification to promotion play-off
2	Viitorul Cujmir	18	11	2	5	55	38	+17	24	
3	Autobuzul Ieșelnița	18	11	1	6	39	24	+15	23	
4	IMA Șimian	18	9	2	7	50	26	+24	20	
5	Meva Drobeta-Turnu Severin	18	8	0	10	45	45	0	16	
6	Unirea Vânători	18	7	2	9	27	28	−1	16	
7	CIL Drobeta-Turnu Severin	18	7	1	10	31	42	−11	15	
8	Foresta Orșova	18	6	0	12	26	46	−20	12	
9	Cutezătorii Orșova	18	6	0	12	20	51	−31	12	
10	Dunărea Svinița	18	3	0	15	16	53	−37	6	

Rules for classification: 1) Points; 2) Goal difference; 3) Number of goals scored.
(C) Champions; (Q) Qualified for the phase indicated

=== Mureș County ===
Pos	Team	Pld	W	D	L	GF	GA	GD	Pts	Qualification or relegation
1	CFR Sighișoara (C, Q)	30	22	5	3	109	29	+80	49	Qualification to promotion play-off
2	Viitorul Târgu Mureș	30	23	3	4	82	22	+60	49	
3	Mureșul Luduș	30	20	4	6	73	31	+42	44	
4	Energia Iernut	30	15	5	10	65	44	+21	35	
5	Voința Târnăveni	30	14	6	10	43	36	+7	34	
6	Oțelul Târgu Mureș	30	11	7	12	45	45	0	29	
7	Voința Miercurea Nirajului	30	12	5	13	41	50	−9	29	
8	Lemnarul Târgu Mureș	30	11	6	13	49	52	−3	28	
9	Tractorul Sărmașu	30	13	2	15	47	62	−15	28	
10	Fabrica de Zahăr Târgu Mureș	30	10	7	13	44	50	−6	27	
11	Dermagant Târgu Mureș	30	10	6	14	37	40	−3	26	
12	Lacul Ursu Sovata	30	9	8	13	42	52	−10	26	
13	Gloria Târgu Mureș	30	8	8	14	30	47	−17	24	
14	Mureșul Confecția Târgu Mureș	30	10	4	16	43	66	−23	24	
15	Ciocanul Târgu Mureș	30	10	3	17	28	51	−23	23	
16	Metalul Sighișoara	30	2	1	27	20	121	−101	5	

Rules for classification: 1) Points; 2) Goal difference; 3) Number of goals scored.
(C) Champions; (Q) Qualified for the phase indicated

=== Neamț County ===
Pos	Team	Pld	W	D	L	GF	GA	GD	Pts	Qualification or relegation
1	Cimentul Bicaz (C, Q)	20	15	3	2	54	15	+39	33	Qualification to promotion play-off
2	Relonul Săvinești	20	13	5	2	38	13	+25	31	
3	Celuloza Piatra Neamț	20	12	4	4	44	21	+23	28	
4	Unirea Roman	20	12	2	6	50	20	+30	26	
5	Volanul Bicaz	20	9	3	8	33	36	−3	21	
6	Bradul Roznov	20	8	4	8	25	28	−3	20	
7	Metalul Piatra Neamț	20	7	3	10	30	34	−4	17	
8	Cetatea Târgu Neamț	20	6	3	11	22	44	−22	15	
9	Autobuzul Piatra Neamț	20	3	5	12	26	44	−18	11	
10	Viitorul Săvinești	20	3	5	12	12	42	−30	11	
11	Laminorul Roman (R)	20	2	3	15	16	53	−37	7	Relegation to Neamț County Championship II
12	Moldova Roman (Note: Moldova Roman was expelled in the first part of the season and all its results were canceled.) (D)	0	0	0	0	0	0	0	0	Expelled

Rules for classification: 1) Points; 2) Goal difference; 3) Number of goals scored.
(C) Champions; (D) Disqualified; (Q) Qualified for the phase indicated; (R) Relegated

=== Olt County ===
Pos	Team	Pld	W	D	L	GF	GA	GD	Pts	Qualification or relegation
1	FC Caracal (C, Q)	20	17	2	1	101	13	+88	36	Qualification to promotion play-off
2	Rapid Piatra-Olt	20	11	4	5	41	20	+21	26	
3	Aluminiu Slatina	20	11	3	6	48	29	+19	25	
4	Victoria Caracal	20	11	2	7	34	31	+3	24	
5	Recolta Stoicănești	20	10	3	7	35	24	+11	23	
6	Metalul Slatina	20	9	5	6	28	32	−4	23	
7	Valea Oltului Cilieni	20	7	4	9	33	31	+2	18	
8	Petrolul Potcoava	20	8	1	11	33	41	−8	17	
9	Oltul Drăgănești-Olt	20	5	5	10	20	48	−28	15	
10	Progresul Brastavățu	20	3	1	16	22	79	−57	7	
11	Înainte Tia Mare	20	3	0	17	15	62	−47	6	

Rules for classification: 1) Points; 2) Goal difference; 3) Number of goals scored.
(C) Champions; (Q) Qualified for the phase indicated

=== Prahova County ===
Pos	Team	Pld	W	D	L	GF	GA	GD	Pts	Qualification or relegation
1	Victoria Florești (C, Q)	30	19	3	8	61	23	+38	41	Qualification to promotion play-off
2	Petrolul Băicoi	30	17	7	6	45	23	+22	41	
3	Feroemail Ploiești	30	13	11	6	39	29	+10	37	
4	Avântul Măneciu	30	15	4	11	62	55	+7	34	
5	Flacăra Ploiești	30	11	11	8	45	41	+4	33	
6	Vagonul Ploiești	30	15	2	13	51	34	+17	32	
7	Rafinăria Câmpina	30	11	8	11	36	31	+5	30	
8	UZUC Ploiești	30	7	14	9	33	28	+5	28	
9	Chimistul Valea Călugărească	30	8	12	10	33	39	−6	28	
10	Geamuri Boldești-Scăieni	30	9	9	12	28	40	−12	27	
11	Victoria Mizil	30	10	6	14	36	43	−7	26	
12	Viitorul Slănic	30	10	6	14	39	53	−14	26	
13	Rafinăria Teleajen	30	9	7	14	24	44	−20	25	
14	Neptun Câmpina	30	8	8	14	35	39	−4	24	
15	Electrica Câmpina (Note: Electrica Câmpina was spared from relegation due to the promotion of Victoria Florești in Divizia C.)	30	7	9	14	30	47	−17	23	Spared from relegation
16	Petrolul Urlați (R)	30	6	9	15	29	63	−34	21	Relegation to Prahova County Championship II

Rules for classification: 1) Points; 2) Goal difference; 3) Number of goals scored.
(C) Champions; (Q) Qualified for the phase indicated; (R) Relegated

=== Satu Mare County ===
Pos	Team	Pld	W	D	L	GF	GA	GD	Pts	Qualification or relegation
1	Spartac Satu Mare (C, Q)	28	20	3	5	72	18	+54	43	Qualification to promotion play-off
2	Voința Carei	28	18	4	6	75	23	+52	40	
3	Rapid Satu Mare	28	17	5	6	62	30	+32	39	
4	Recolta Urziceni	28	18	1	9	63	30	+33	37	
5	Sticla Poiana Codrului	28	15	5	8	60	36	+24	35	
6	Energia Negrești-Oaș	28	12	8	8	51	38	+13	32	
7	Forestiera Bixad	28	13	4	11	71	54	+17	30	
8	Victoria Livada	28	13	4	11	36	42	−6	30	
9	Unirea Tășnad	28	8	10	10	51	57	−6	26	
10	Recolta Dorolț	28	7	10	11	40	56	−16	24	
11	Spicul Ardud	28	8	6	14	44	59	−15	22	
12	Stăruința Berveni	28	9	4	15	29	53	−24	22	
13	Recolta Turulung	28	8	2	18	26	71	−45	18	
14	Speranța Halmeu	28	5	4	19	26	78	−52	14	

Rules for classification: 1) Points; 2) Goal difference; 3) Number of goals scored.
(C) Champions; (Q) Qualified for the phase indicated

=== Sălaj County ===
Pos	Team	Pld	W	D	L	GF	GA	GD	Pts	Qualification or relegation
1	Măgura Șimleu Silvaniei (C, Q)	22	21	0	1	89	7	+82	42	Qualification to promotion play-off
2	Rapid CFR Jibou	22	16	1	5	37	20	+17	33	
3	Victoria Zalău	22	12	4	6	41	23	+18	28	
4	Metal-Lemn Șimleu Silvaniei	22	12	2	8	47	34	+13	26	
5	Voința Șimleu Silvaniei	22	10	3	9	34	31	+3	23	
6	Unirea Tricolor Nadiș	22	9	2	11	39	38	+1	20	
7	Minerul Surduc	22	8	4	10	27	39	−12	20	
8	Panificația Jibou	22	8	1	13	30	51	−21	17	
9	Voința Zalău	22	6	3	13	26	46	−20	15	
10	Dumbrava Gâlgău Almașului	22	4	5	13	38	59	−21	13	
11	Progresul Cehu Silvaniei	22	6	1	15	17	46	−29	13	
12	Recolta Zăuan	22	6	1	15	30	61	−31	13	

Rules for classification: 1) Points; 2) Goal difference; 3) Number of goals scored.
(C) Champions; (Q) Qualified for the phase indicated

=== Sibiu County ===
Pos	Team	Pld	W	D	L	GF	GA	GD	Pts	Qualification or relegation
1	Progresul Sibiu (C, Q)	24	18	5	1	58	17	+41	41	Qualification to promotion play-off
2	Unirea Tălmaciu	25	13	6	6	54	29	+25	32	
3	Textila Cisnădie	26	14	3	9	47	28	+19	31	
4	Metalul IO Sibiu	26	12	6	8	40	29	+11	30	
5	Spartac Mediaș	22	13	3	6	36	22	+14	29	
6	Record Mediaș	23	9	7	7	32	27	+5	25	
7	Carbosin Copșa Mică	26	9	6	11	39	32	+7	24	
8	Textila Mediaș	22	7	10	5	32	26	+6	24	
9	Automecanica Mediaș	21	9	5	7	35	26	+9	23	
10	CFR Sibiu	25	9	4	12	37	46	−9	22	
11	Stăruința Mediaș	23	7	7	9	25	29	−4	21	
12	Metalurgica Sibiu	26	8	4	14	30	46	−16	20	
13	Progresul Agnita	27	9	2	16	39	57	−18	20	
14	Carpați Mârșa	26	8	3	15	34	63	−29	19	
15	Voința Sibiu	25	2	1	22	9	70	−61	5	

Rules for classification: 1) Points; 2) Goal difference; 3) Number of goals scored.
(C) Champions; (Q) Qualified for the phase indicated

=== Suceava County ===
Pos	Team	Pld	W	D	L	GF	GA	GD	Pts	Qualification or relegation
1	Avântul Rădăuți (C, Q)	22	15	4	3	68	18	+50	34	Qualification to promotion play-off
2	Chimia Bradul Vama	22	10	10	2	41	16	+25	30	
3	Silvicultorul Moldovița	22	12	5	5	49	17	+32	29	
4	Străduința Suceava	22	10	5	7	36	30	+6	25	
5	Avântul Frasin	22	10	2	10	44	32	+12	22	
6	Ocrotirea Siret	22	8	6	8	33	49	−16	22	
7	Filatura Fălticeni	22	9	3	10	34	38	−4	21	
8	URA Suceava	22	7	6	9	27	30	−3	20	
9	CFR Suceava	22	7	6	9	26	44	−18	20	
10	Siretul Dolhasca	22	7	3	12	24	38	−14	17	
11	Locomotiva Dornești	22	6	3	13	21	65	−44	15	
12	Chimia Suceava II	22	4	1	17	16	51	−35	9	

Rules for classification: 1) Points; 2) Goal difference; 3) Number of goals scored.
(C) Champions; (Q) Qualified for the phase indicated

=== Teleorman County ===
Pos	Team	Pld	W	D	L	GF	GA	GD	Pts	Qualification or relegation
1	CFR Roșiori (C, Q)	28	21	3	4	124	33	+91	45	Qualification to promotion play-off
2	Electrica Turnu Măgurele	28	14	5	9	67	42	+25	33	
3	Sporting Roșiori	28	15	3	10	56	43	+13	33	
4	Voința Balta Sărată	28	15	3	10	44	41	+3	33	
5	Teleormanul Troianu	28	13	5	10	51	40	+11	31	
6	Recolta Izvoarele	28	13	4	11	48	46	+2	30	
7	Dunărea Zimnicea	28	13	2	13	62	48	+14	28	
8	Șoimii Scrioaștea	28	13	1	14	48	66	−18	27	
9	Flamura Roșie Buzescu	28	11	4	13	47	62	−15	26	
10	Tractorul Drăgănești-Vlașca	28	11	4	13	50	67	−17	26	
11	Unirea Traian	28	10	4	14	49	44	+5	24	
12	Recolta Segarcea-Vale	28	9	5	14	44	76	−32	23	
13	Recolta Mârzănești	28	9	4	15	28	66	−38	22	
14	Secera și Ciocanul Plosca	28	9	3	16	48	71	−23	21	
15	Progresul Smirdioasa	28	7	4	17	36	57	−21	18	

Rules for classification: 1) Points; 2) Goal difference; 3) Number of goals scored.
(C) Champions; (Q) Qualified for the phase indicated

=== Timiș County ===
Pos	Team	Pld	W	D	L	GF	GA	GD	Pts	Qualification or relegation
1	Șoimii Timișoara (C, Q)	30	16	9	5	58	32	+26	41	Qualification to promotion play-off
2	Laminorul Nădrag	30	17	6	7	71	33	+38	40	
3	Politehnica Timișoara II	30	15	5	10	49	39	+10	35	
4	Ceramica Jimbolia	30	15	4	11	55	30	+25	34	
5	Auto Timișoara	30	15	4	11	65	43	+22	34	
6	Comerțul Timișoara	30	14	4	12	47	41	+6	32	
7	Progresul Gătaia	30	13	5	12	45	49	−4	31	
8	Unirea Jimbolia	30	12	5	13	42	40	+2	29	
9	Progresul Timișoara	30	9	11	10	30	34	−4	29	
10	Recaș	30	12	5	13	40	47	−7	29	
11	Unirea Sânnicolau Mare	30	10	8	12	42	39	+3	28	
12	Șoimii Buziaș	30	10	8	12	47	47	0	28	
13	Recolta Nerău	30	10	7	13	40	54	−14	27	
14	Arta Textilă Timișoara	30	10	6	14	47	50	−3	26	
15	Progresul Ciacova	30	12	2	16	41	70	−29	26	
16	Chimia Margina	30	5	1	24	19	90	−71	11	

Rules for classification: 1) Points; 2) Goal difference; 3) Number of goals scored.
(C) Champions; (Q) Qualified for the phase indicated

=== Tulcea County ===
Pos	Team	Pld	W	D	L	GF	GA	GD	Pts	Qualification or relegation
1	Vulturul Tulcea (C, Q)	26	23	3	0	84	18	+66	49	Qualification to promotion play-off
2	Granitul Babadag	26	18	5	3	87	35	+52	41	
3	Minerul Măcin	26	17	3	6	62	38	+24	37	
4	Recolta Frecăței	26	13	3	10	52	44	+8	29	
5	Pescărușul Sarichioi	26	13	3	10	54	48	+6	29	
6	Marina Tulcea	26	12	4	10	59	46	+13	28	
7	Stăruința Baia	26	13	2	11	52	43	+9	28	
8	Dunărea Tulcea	26	11	5	10	53	46	+7	27	
9	Rapid Izvoarele	26	11	4	11	35	31	+4	26	
10	Izbânda Mihail Kogălniceanu	26	11	1	14	52	65	−13	23	
11	Progresul Tulcea	26	9	3	14	35	54	−19	21	
12	Voința Tulcea	26	8	3	15	45	65	−20	19	
13	Avântul Ceamurlia de Jos	26	1	1	24	13	89	−76	3	
14	Tractorul Horia	26	1	1	24	9	70	−61	3	

Rules for classification: 1) Points; 2) Goal difference; 3) Number of goals scored.
(C) Champions; (Q) Qualified for the phase indicated

=== Vaslui County ===
Pos	Team	Pld	W	D	L	GF	GA	GD	Pts	Qualification or relegation
1	Viitorul Vaslui (C, Q)	18	14	3	1	65	12	+53	31	Qualification to promotion play-off
2	Hușana Huși	18	12	3	3	53	21	+32	27	
3	Flacăra Murgeni	18	11	4	3	46	15	+31	26	
4	IAS Codăești	18	12	2	4	40	28	+12	26	
5	Metalul Bârlad	18	7	4	7	26	22	+4	18	
6	Spartac Bârlad	18	6	4	8	22	26	−4	16	
7	Avântul Huși	18	4	5	9	19	29	−10	13	
8	Energia Vaslui	18	3	4	11	20	62	−42	10	
9	Iprodcoop Vaslui	18	2	3	13	15	51	−36	7	
10	Confecția Vaslui	18	3	0	15	11	51	−40	6	

Rules for classification: 1) Points; 2) Goal difference; 3) Number of goals scored.
(C) Champions; (Q) Qualified for the phase indicated

=== Vâlcea County ===
Pos	Team	Pld	W	D	L	GF	GA	GD	Pts	Qualification or relegation
1	Lotru Brezoi (C, Q)	30	25	3	2	136	14	+122	53	Qualification to promotion play-off
2	Unirea Bujoreni	30	21	3	6	87	31	+56	45	
3	Oltul CIL Râmnicu Vâlcea	30	21	3	6	85	35	+50	45	
4	Flacăra Horezu	30	20	4	6	78	38	+40	44	
5	Sănătatea Govora	30	19	5	6	93	38	+55	43	
6	Păstorul Vaideeni	30	17	3	10	79	50	+29	37	
7	Flacăra Râmnicu Vâlcea	30	13	1	16	57	61	−4	27	
8	Viitorul Băbeni	30	9	7	14	41	59	−18	25	
9	Victoria Frâncești	30	11	3	16	48	85	−37	25	
10	Viitorul Râureni	30	11	2	17	53	74	−21	24	
11	Podgoria Crețeni	30	11	2	17	49	81	−32	24	
12	Unirea Băbeni	30	7	8	15	41	68	−27	22	
13	Cozia Călimănești	30	7	7	16	44	71	−27	21	
14	Vâlceana Râmnicu Vâlcea	30	8	2	20	33	86	−53	18	
15	Voința Drăgășani	30	6	3	21	28	84	−56	15	
16	Șoimii IRTA Râmnicu Vâlcea	30	3	2	25	12	94	−82	8	

Rules for classification: 1) Points; 2) Goal difference; 3) Number of goals scored.
(C) Champions; (Q) Qualified for the phase indicated

=== Vrancea County ===
Pos	Team	Pld	W	D	L	GF	GA	GD	Pts	Qualification or relegation
1	Chimica Mărășești (C, Q)	22	18	3	1	95	12	+83	39	Qualification to promotion play-off
2	Foresta Gugești	22	14	6	2	69	24	+45	34	
3	Luceafărul Focșani	22	15	3	4	55	22	+33	33	
4	Rapid Panciu	22	11	3	8	65	40	+25	25	
5	Foresta Cosmești	22	11	3	8	62	48	+14	25	
6	Automobilul Focșani	22	9	6	7	44	35	+9	24	
7	Flacăra Odobești	22	10	3	9	50	35	+15	23	
8	Victoria Focșani	22	9	1	12	29	41	−12	19	
9	Victoria Odobești	22	6	5	11	32	52	−20	17	
10	Automobilul Adjud	22	5	4	13	34	75	−41	14	
11	Trotușul Ruginești	22	5	1	16	23	70	−47	11	
12	Siretul Doaga	22	0	0	22	9	113	−104	0	

Rules for classification: 1) Points; 2) Goal difference; 3) Number of goals scored.
(C) Champions; (Q) Qualified for the phase indicated

== See also ==
- 1969–70 Divizia A
- 1969–70 Divizia B
- 1969–70 Divizia C
- 1969–70 Cupa României
