= Liga IV Alba =

Fourth tier Romanian football league

- Founded: 1968
- Country: Romania
- Level on pyramid: 4
- Promotion to: Liga III
- Relegation to: Liga V Alba
- Domestic cup: Cupa României – County phase
- Current champions: Viitorul Sântimbru (1st title) (2025–26)
- Most championships: Ocna Mureș and CIL Blaj (7 titles each)
- Website: ajfalba.ro
- Current: 2025–26 Liga IV Alba

Liga IV Alba, officially known as SuperLiga Alba, is one of the regional football divisions of Liga IV, the fourth tier of the Romanian football league system, for clubs based in Alba County, and is organized by AJF Alba – Asociația Județeană de Fotbal (lit. 'County Football Association').

It is contested by a variable number of teams, depending on the number of teams relegated from Liga III, the number of teams promoted from Liga V Alba, and the teams that withdraw or enter the competition. The winner may or may not be promoted to Liga III, depending on the result of a promotion play-off contested against the winner of a neighboring county series.

== History ==
The Alba County Championship was formed in 1968 and placed under the authority of the newly created Consiliul Județean pentru Educație Fizică și Sport (lit. 'County Council for Physical Education and Sports') in Alba County. This occurred as part of the broader new administrative and territorial reorganization of the country, during which each county established its own football championship, integrating teams from the former regional championships as well as those that had previously competed in town and rayon level competitions.

Since then, the structure and organization of Alba’s main county competition, like those of other county championships, have undergone numerous changes. Between 1968 and 1992, it was known as Campionatul Județean (County Championship). In 1992, it was renamed Divizia C – Faza Județeană (Divizia C – County Phase), became Divizia D in 1997, and has been known as Liga IV since 2006, before being renamed SuperLiga Alba starting with the 2025–26 season.

== Promotion ==
The champions of each county association play against one another in a play-off to earn promotion to Liga III. Geographical criteria are taken into consideration when the play-offs are drawn. In total, there are 41 county champions plus the Bucharest municipal champion.

== List of champions ==
| Ed. | Season | Winners |
County Championship
| 1 | 1968–69 | Unirea Alba Iulia |
| 2 | 1969–70 | Unirea Alba Iulia |
| 3 | 1970–71 | Textila Sebeș |
| 4 | 1971–72 | CIL Blaj |
| 5 | 1972–73 | Constructorul Alba Iulia |
| 6 | 1973–74 | CFR Teiuș |
| 7 | 1974–75 | Autobuzul Cugir |
| 8 | 1975–76 | CFR Teiuș |
| 9 | 1976–77 | ICIM Cugir |
| 10 | 1977–78 | CIL Blaj |
| 11 | 1978–79 | CPL Sebeș |
| 12 | 1979–80 | Soda Ocna Mureș |
| 13 | 1980–81 | Mecanica Alba Iulia |
| 14 | 1981–82 | Soda Ocna Mureș |
| 15 | 1982–83 | CIL Blaj |
| 16 | 1983–84 | Târnavele Blaj |
| 17 | 1984–85 | Cuprom Abrud |
| 18 | 1985–86 | Târnavele Blaj |
| 19 | 1986–87 | Șurianu Sebeș |
| 20 | 1987–88 | Energia Săsciori |
| 21 | 1988–89 | Soda Ocna Mureș |
| 23 | 1990–91 | Rapid CFR Teiuș |
| 24 | 1991–92 | Minaur Zlatna |
Divizia C – County phase
| 25 | 1992–93 | Minaur Zlatna |
| 26 | 1993–94 | Minaur Zlatna |
| 27 | 1994–95 | Minerul Roșia Montană |
| 28 | 1995–96 | Metalul Aiud |
| 29 | 1996–97 | Minerul Roșia Montană |
Divizia D
| 30 | 1997–98 | Soda Ocna Mureș |
| 31 | 1998–99 | Cuprirom Abrud |
| 32 | 1999–00 | Soda Ocna Mureș |
| 33 | 2000–01 | Rapid CFR Teiuș |
| 34 | 2001–02 | CIL Blaj |
| 35 | 2002–03 | Hârtia Petrești |
| 36 | 2003–04 | Metalul Aiud |
| 37 | 2004–05 | CSM Sebeș |
| 38 | 2005–06 | FC Cugir |

| Ed. | Season | Winners |
Liga IV
| 39 | 2006–07 | Kozara Vințu de Jos |
| 40 | 2007–08 | Arieșul Câmpeni |
| 41 | 2008–09 | Minaur Zlatna |
| 42 | 2009–10 | Performanța Ighiu |
| 43 | 2010–11 | Performanța Ighiu |
| 44 | 2011–12 | Europa Alba Iulia |
| 46 | 2013–14 | Industria Galda |
| 47 | 2014–15 | Performanța Ighiu |
| 48 | 2015–16 | Mureșul Vințu de Jos |
| 49 | 2016–17 | Șurianu Sebeș |
| 50 | 2017–18 | Ocna Mureș |
| 51 | 2018–19 | Sportul Petrești |
| 52 | 2019–20 | Ocna Mureș |
| – | 2020–21 | Not disputed (Note: Not disputed due to COVID-19 pandemic in Romania.) |
| 53 | 2021–22 | CSU Alba Iulia |
| 54 | 2022–23 | Industria Galda |
| 55 | 2023–24 | CIL Blaj |
| 56 | 2024–25 | Hidro Mecanica Șugag 1984 |
| 57 | 2025–26 | Viitorul Sântimbru |

== See also ==
=== Main Leagues ===
- Liga I
- Liga II
- Liga III
- Liga IV

=== County Leagues (Liga IV series) ===
North–East

- Liga IV Bacău
- Liga IV Botoșani
- Liga IV Iași
- Liga IV Neamț
- Liga IV Suceava
- Liga IV Vaslui

North–West

- Liga IV Bihor
- Liga IV Bistrița-Năsăud
- Liga IV Cluj
- Liga IV Maramureș
- Liga IV Satu Mare
- Liga IV Sălaj

Center

- Liga IV Alba
- Liga IV Brașov
- Liga IV Covasna
- Liga IV Harghita
- Liga IV Mureș
- Liga IV Sibiu

West

- Liga IV Arad
- Liga IV Caraș-Severin
- Liga IV Gorj
- Liga IV Hunedoara
- Liga IV Mehedinți
- Liga IV Timiș

South–West

- Liga IV Argeș
- Liga IV Dâmbovița
- Liga IV Dolj
- Liga IV Olt
- Liga IV Teleorman
- Liga IV Vâlcea

South

- Liga IV Bucharest
- Liga IV Călărași
- Liga IV Giurgiu
- Liga IV Ialomița
- Liga IV Ilfov
- Liga IV Prahova

South–East

- Liga IV Brăila
- Liga IV Buzău
- Liga IV Constanța
- Liga IV Galați
- Liga IV Tulcea
- Liga IV Vrancea
