= Ohaba =

- Commune
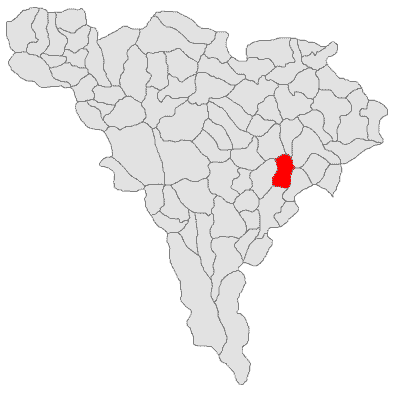
- Location in Alba County

- Location in Romania
- Coordinates: 46°4′N 23°47′E
- Country: Romania
- County: Alba

Government
  - Mayor (2020–2024): Adrian Nicolae Mihălțan (PNL)
- Area: 40.52 km^{2} (15.64 sq mi)
- Elevation: 352 m (1,155 ft)
- Population (2021-12-01): 538
  - Density: 13/km^{2} (34/sq mi)
- Time zone: EET/EEST (UTC+2/+3)
- Postal code: 517530
- Area code: (+40) 02 58
- Vehicle reg.: AB
- Website: comunaohaba.ro

Ohaba (Hungarian: Székásszabadja; German: Neudorf) is a commune located in Alba County, Transylvania, Romania. It is composed of four villages: Colibi (Székás), Măghierat (Magyarádtanya), Ohaba, and Secășel (Szekasbesenyö; Heidendorf).

The commune is located in the eastern part of the county, on the banks of the river Secaș and its left tributary, the Ohaba.

Historical population
Year	Pop.	±%
2002	920	—
2011	757	−17.7%
2021	538	−28.9%
Source: Census data

At the 2011 census, the commune had a population of 757; of those, 92.73% were ethnic Romanians and 2.51% Roma. At the 2021 census, the population had dropped to 538, of which 90.15 were ethnic Romanians.

== Natives ==
- Sebastian Rusan (1884–1956), Orthodox cleric, Archbishop of Iași, Metropolitan of Moldavia and Bukovina
