= Târnava =

Târnava Küküllő, Kokel
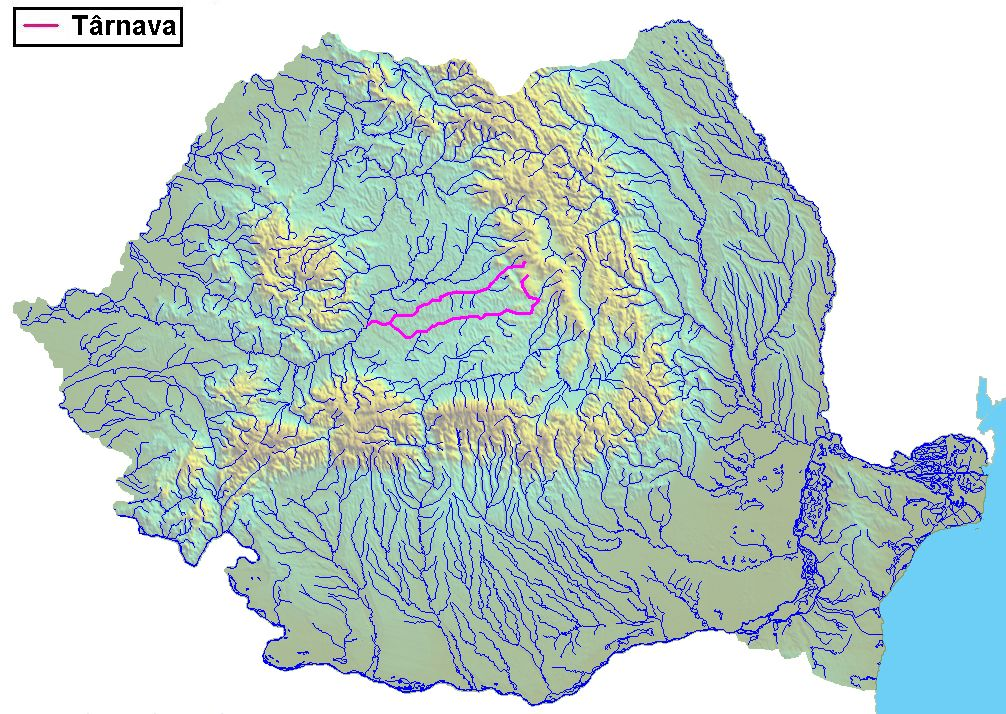

- Location within Romania

Location
- Country: Romania
- Counties: Alba County

Physical characteristics
- Source: Confluence of the Târnava Mare and the Târnava Mică
  - location: Blaj, Romania
  - coordinates: 46°10′18″N 23°53′35″E
- Mouth: Mureș
  - location: Teiuș, Romania
  - coordinates: 46°9′16″N 23°41′56″E
- Length: 23 km (14 mi)
- Basin size: 6,253 km^{2} (2,414 sq mi)
- Discharge
  - average: 25 m^{3}/s (880 cu ft/s)

Basin features
- Progression: Mureș→ Tisza→ Danube→ Black Sea
- Tributaries
  - left: Târnava Mare, Secaș
  - right: Târnava Mică, Dunărița

The Târnava (full name in Romanian: Râul Târnava; Hungarian: Küküllő; German: Kokel; Turkish: Kokul or Kokulu) is a river in Romania. It is formed by the confluence of the Târnava Mare and Târnava Mică in the town of Blaj. The Târnava flows into the Mureș after 23 km near the town of Teiuș. The two source rivers of the Târnava are the Târnava Mare and Târnava Mică, and its tributaries include the Tur, Izvorul Iezerului, Secaș, and the Dunărița. Its drainage basin covers an area of 6,253 km^{2} (2,414 sq mi).

== Etymology ==
The name Târnava is of Slavic origin from trn, meaning "thorn".

Other proposed origins for the river's Romanian name is Turn (tower) + dav from Dacian dava (structure/fortress), i.e. "the river that flows amongst towers and davas"; or a reference to the Romanian city of Turda, forming Tur + ava from dava.

The Hungarian name Küküllő is of Old Turkic origin from kukel meaning sloe, and is thought to have originated from the Avar people.

Etymological origins of the Târnava river.
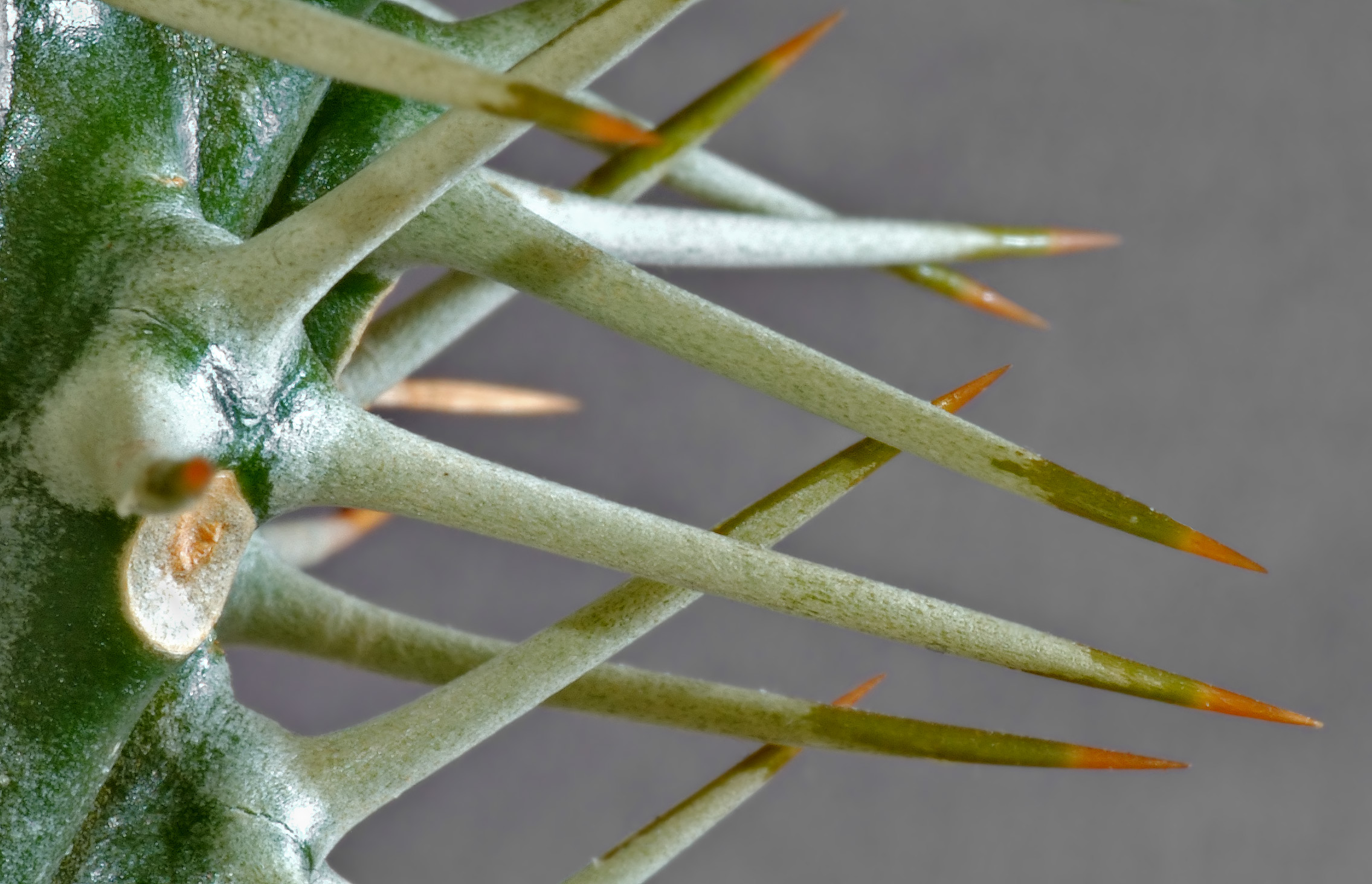
Romanian: Târnava

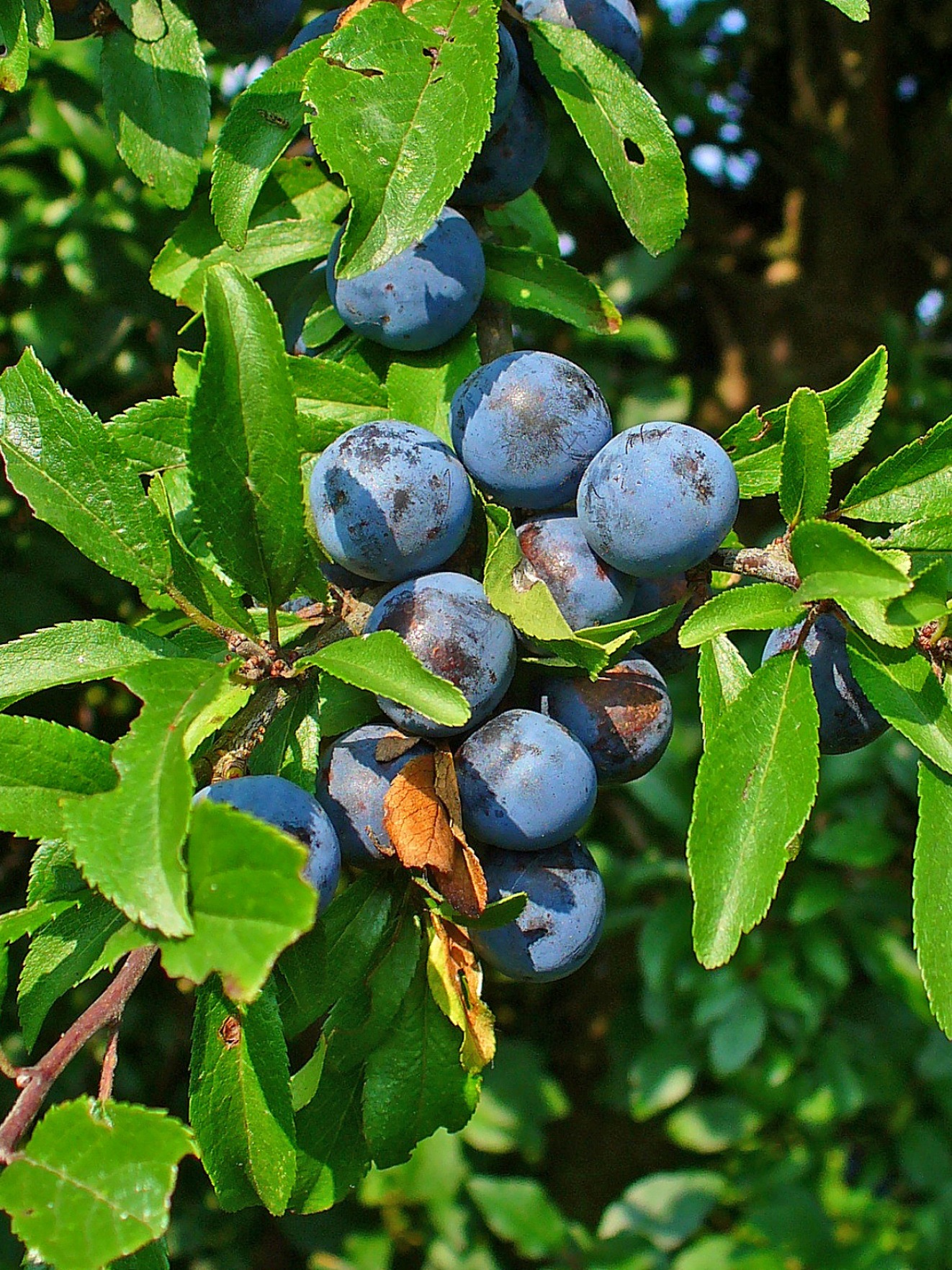
Küküllő Hungarian: kökényes
