= 2025–26 Liga II =

Liga II
- Season: 2025–26
- Champions: Corvinul Hunedoara
- Promoted: Corvinul Hunedoara; Sepsi OSK
- Relegated: Ceahlăul Piatra Neamț; Câmpulung Muscel; Dinamo București; Tunari; Olimpia Satu Mare

The 2025–26 Liga II (also known as Liga 2 Casa Pariurilor for sponsorship reasons) was the 86th season of Liga II, the second tier of the Romanian football league system, and the tenth consecutive season held in a single series.

The format has been maintained, with a regular season contested by twenty-two teams in a single round-robin tournament. The top six teams at the end of the regular season advance to the promotion play-offs. The first two teams in the play-offs will be promoted to Liga I, while the third- and fourth-placed teams will play a promotion/relegation play-off against the 13th- and 14th-placed teams from Liga I.

The remaining fourteen teams will compete in the relegation play-outs, divided into two groups. The last two teams from each group will be relegated to Liga III. Additionally, the sixth-placed teams from each play-out group will face each other in a play-off to decide the final team to be relegated.

== Teams ==
A total of twenty-two teams contested the league, including fourteen from the previous season, two relegated from Liga I, five promoted from Liga III, and one taking over a place through a cession.

=== Team changes ===
To Liga II

Relegated from Liga I

- Sepsi OSK Sfântu Gheorghe – after eight years in the top flight.
- Politehnica Iași – after two years in the top flight.

Promoted from Liga III

- Bacău – debut.
- Dinamo București – debut.
- Tunari – after one year of absence.
- Gloria Bistrița-Năsăud – debut.
- Olimpia Satu Mare – debut.

From Liga II

Promoted to Liga I

- Argeș Pitești– ended a two-year stay.
- Csíkszereda Miercurea Ciuc– ended a six-year stay.
- Metaloglobus București– ended an eight-year stay.

Relegated to Liga III

- Focșani – ended a one-year stay.
- Mioveni (excluded) – ended a two-year stay.
- Viitorul Pandurii Târgu Jiu (excluded) – ended a seven-year stay.

Other changes

- Gloria Buzău, which was relegated to Liga II at the end of the 2024–25 Liga I season, withdrew due to financial issues and entered bankruptcy.
- FCU 1948 Craiova was excluded after failing to obtain a Liga II license.
- Following the withdrawal and exclusion of two clubs, the Romanian Football Federation granted the vacant places to Dumbrăvița and Câmpulung Muscel, based on their applications and in accordance with the regulations, as the two best-ranked teams among the five relegated from the previous season.
- Unirea Ungheni ceded its Liga II place to ASA Târgu Mureș.
- Gloria Bistrița-Năsăud changed its name to Gloria Bistrița.

=== Stadiums and locations ===
Locations of the 2025–26 Liga II teams
Location of Bucharest and close-by Ilfov teams.

Club	City	Stadium	Capacity
AFC Câmpulung Muscel	Câmpulung	Muscelul	3,000
ASA Târgu Mureș	Târgu Mureș	Trans-Sil	8,200
Ceahlăul Piatra Neamț	Piatra Neamț	Ceahlăul	18,000
Chindia Târgoviște	Târgoviște	Eugen Popescu	8,400
Concordia Chiajna	Chiajna	Concordia	5,123
Corvinul Hunedoara	Hunedoara	Complexul Sportiv Corvinul	16,500
CS Afumați	Afumați	Comunal (Note: Afumați played its home match in the 16th round on 6 December 2025 against 1599 Șelimbăr at Voința Stadium in Ghermănești.)	2,000
CS Tunari	Tunari	Central	1,700
CS Dinamo București	București	CNAF (Note: Dinamo București was relocated to the CNAF Stadium in Buftea, as the Dinamo Stadium did not receive a license to host matches in Liga II.)	1,600
CSC 1599 Șelimbăr	Șelimbăr	Măgura (Note: 1599 Șelimbăr was relocated to the Măgura Stadium in Cisnădie, because Comunal Stadium in Șelimbăr is under renovations.)	2,450
CSC Dumbrăvița	Dumbrăvița	Ștefan Dobay	500
CSM Olimpia Satu Mare	Satu Mare	Daniel Prodan	18,000
CSM Reșița	Reșița	Mircea Chivu	12,500
CSM Slatina	Slatina	1 Mai	12,000
FC Bacău	Ruși-Ciutea	Ruși-Ciutea	700
FC Bihor Oradea	Oradea	Iuliu Bodola	12,376
FC Voluntari	Voluntari	Anghel Iordănescu	4,600
Gloria Bistrița	Bistrița	Jean Pădureanu	7,814
Metalul Buzău	Buzău	Metalul	1,573
Politehnica Iași	Iași	Emil Alexandrescu	11,350
Sepsi OSK Sfântu Gheorghe	Sfântu Gheorghe	Sepsi	8,400
Steaua București	București	Steaua	31,254

=== Personnel and kits ===
Note: Flags indicate national team as has been defined under FIFA eligibility rules. Players and Managers may hold more than one non-FIFA nationality.

Team	Manager	Captain	Kit manufacturer	Shirt sponsor
1599 Șelimbăr	(Romania) Eugen Beza	(Romania) Ciprian Natea	Nike	Shopping City Sibiu
Afumați	(Romania) Vasile Neagu	(Romania) Ionuț Zaina	Nike	Shark Doors
ASA Târgu Mureș	(Romania) Eusebiu Tudor	(Romania) Florin Iacob	Kappa	Târgu Mureș
Bacău	(Romania) Costel Enache	(Romania) Ionuț Chirilă	Nike	Dedeman
Bihor Oradea	(Romania) Erik Lincar	(Romania) Ioan Hora	Macron	Selina, Viva Chips
Câmpulung Muscel	(Romania) Vasile Slăninoiu (interim)	(Romania) Ștefan Ghiță	Nike	Superbet
Ceahlăul Piatra Neamț	(Romania) Vasile Avădanei	(Romania) Andrei Marc	Nike	SSAB Impex
Chindia Târgoviște	(Romania) Nicolae Croitoru	(Romania) Cornel Dinu	Nike	Kruk
Concordia Chiajna	(Romania) Andrei Cristea	(Romania) Mihai Bălașa	Masita	—
Corvinul Hunedoara	(Romania) Florin Maxim	(Romania) Alexandru Neacșa	Gamer Design	VBet
Dinamo București	(Romania) Ionel Dănciulescu (Note: Boris Keča retained de facto control of the team while serving as an assistant, while Ionel Dănciulescu was listed as the official head coach in match reports due to licensing regulations.)	(Romania) Roberto Mălăele	Joma	Superbet
Dumbrăvița	(Romania) Florin Fabian	(Romania) Alin Șeroni	Macron	Artoil
Gloria Bistrița	(Romania) Nicolae Grigore	(Romania) Alin Burdeț	Uhlsport	Superbet
Metalul Buzău	(Romania) Valentin Stan	(Romania) Marius Tudorică	Macron	Consiliul Județean Buzău
Olimpia Satu Mare	(Romania) Alexandru Botoș (Note: Although Zoltan Ritli remained the official head coach in match reports due to licensing regulations, Alexandru Botoș took over de facto control of the team while officially serving as an assistant.)	(Romania) Ervin Zsiga	Adidas	M-SYS, Best Build Technology
Politehnica Iași	(Romania) Tibor Selymes	(Romania) Ștefan Ștefanovici	Nike	Maxbet
Reșița	(Romania) Leontin Doană	(Romania) Alin Dudea	Puma	Invest in Reșița
Sepsi OSK Sfântu Gheorghe	(Romania) Ovidiu Burcă	(Romania) Cosmin Matei	Adidas	Diószegi, Gyermelyi
Slatina	(Romania) Viorel Ferfelea	(Romania) Ionuț Mitran	Macron	Organizația Trebuie
Steaua București	(Romania) Daniel Oprița	(Romania) Stephan Drăghici	Adidas	Stanleybet
Tunari	(Romania) Paul Pîrvulescu	(Romania) Claudiu Dragu	Uhlsport	Pinum, Shaormeria Băneasa
Voluntari	(Romania) Florian Pârvu	(Slovakia) Adam Nemec	Nike	Metropola TV

=== Managerial changes ===
==== Pre-season ====
Team	Outgoing manager	Manner	Date of vacancy	Replaced by	Date of arrival
Chindia Târgoviște	(Romania) Costel Pană	Mutual consent	16 June 2025	(Romania) Ilie Poenaru	16 June 2025
Sepsi OSK Sfântu Gheorghe	(Romania) Csaba László	End of interim spell	18 June 2025	(Romania) Ovidiu Burcă	18 June 2025
Dumbrăvița	(Romania) Cosmin Stan	Mutual consent	19 June 2025	(Romania) Florin Fabian	20 June 2025
1599 Șelimbăr	(Romania) Ioan Luca	Mutual consent	1 July 2025	(Romania) Eugen Beza	1 July 2025
ASA Târgu Mureș	(Romania) Cătălin Kalo	Mutual consent	1 July 2025	(Romania) Eusebiu Tudor	1 July 2025
Tunari	(Romania) Dan Alexa	Mutual consent	22 July 2025	(Romania) Bogdan Pătrașcu	25 July 2025

==== During the season ====
Team	Outgoing manager	Manner	Date of vacancy	Position in table		Replaced by	Date of appointment
Team	Outgoing manager	Manner	Date of vacancy	Round	Position	Replaced by	Date of appointment
Olimpia Satu Mare	(Romania) Alexandru Botoș	Sacked	26 August 2025	4th	22nd	(Romania) Zoltan Ritli	2 September 2025
Ceahlăul Piatra Neamț	(Italy) Marco Veronese	Sacked	29 August 2025	4th	11th	(Romania) Vasile Avădanei (interim)	22 August 2025
Gloria Bistrița	(Romania) Cristian Pustai	Sacked	31 August 2025	5th	18th	(Romania) Nicolae Grigore	2 September 2025
Tunari	(Romania) Bogdan Pătrașcu	Sacked	20 September 2025	7th	16th	(Romania) Alin Ilin (interim)	25 September 2025
Concordia Chiajna	(Romania) Nicolae Dică	Sacked	22 September 2025	7th	11th	(Romania) Andrei Cristea	23 September 2025
Ceahlăul Piatra Neamț	(Romania) Vasile Avădanei	End of interim spell	22 September 2025	7th	12th	(Romania) Cristian Pustai	25 September 2025
Olimpia Satu Mare	(Romania) Zoltan Ritli	Remained as assistant	20 October 2025	10th	22nd	(Romania) Alexandru Botoș	20 October 2025
Tunari	(Romania) Alin Ilin	End of interim spell	4 November 2025	12th	21st	(Romania) Dinu Todoran	4 November 2025
Politehnica Iași	(Portugal) Tony	Mutual consent	13 November 2025	13th	10th	(Romania) Tibor Selymes	13 November 2025
Câmpulung Muscel	(Romania) Alecsandru Popovici	Advanced technical director	17 January 2026	17th	21st	(Croatia) Goran Miscević	17 January 2026
Slatina	(Romania) Claudiu Niculescu	Signed by Unirea Slobozia	4 February 2026	17th	14th	(Romania) Viorel Ferfelea	6 February 2026
Ceahlăul Piatra-Neamț	(Romania) Cristian Pustai	Resigned	11 February 2026	17th	17th	(Romania) Vasile Avădanei	11 February 2026
Dinamo București	(Romania) Florin Bratu	Signed by Metaloglobus București	3 March 2026	19th	19th	(Bosnia and Herzegovina) Boris Keča	3 March 2026
Reșița	(Romania) Flavius Stoican	Resigned	9 March 2026	20th	8th	(Romania) Leontin Doană	10 March 2026
Câmpulung Muscel	(Croatia) Goran Miscević	Sacked	10 March 2026	20th	22nd	(Serbia) Vladislav Rosić	11 March 2026
Dinamo București	(Bosnia and Herzegovina) Boris Keča	Remained as assistant	2 April 2026	1st (play-out)	7th (play-out)	(Romania) Ionel Dănciulescu	2 April 2026
Tunari	(Romania) Dinu Todoran	Resigned	4 April 2026	2nd (play-out)	7th (play-out)	(Romania) Alin Ilin (interim)	4 April 2026
Chindia Târgoviște	(Romania) Ilie Poenaru	Sacked	10 April 2026	3rd (play-off)	6th (play-off)	(Romania) Nicolae Croitoru	11 April 2026
Câmpulung Muscel	(Serbia) Vladislav Rosić	Resigned	10 April 2026	3rd (play-out)	7th (play-out)	(Romania) Vasile Slăninoiu (interim)	15 April 2026
Tunari	(Romania) Alin Ilin	End of interim spell	17 April 2026	3rd (play-out)	7th (play-out)	(Romania) Paul Pîrvulescu	17 April 2026

== Regular season ==
=== League table ===
Pos	Team	Pld	W	D	L	GF	GA	GD	Pts	Qualification
1	Corvinul Hunedoara	21	16	5	0	37	13	+24	53	Qualification for Promotion play-off
2	Sepsi OSK Sfântu Gheorghe	21	13	5	3	34	18	+16	44	Qualification for Promotion play-off
3	Chindia Târgoviște	21	12	3	6	38	20	+18	39	Qualification for Promotion play-off
4	Bihor Oradea	21	12	3	6	40	24	+16	39	Qualification for Promotion play-off
5	Voluntari	21	11	6	4	30	16	+14	39	Qualification for Promotion play-off
6	Steaua București	21	12	3	6	36	27	+9	39	Qualification for Promotion play-off
7	ASA Târgu Mureș	21	11	4	6	37	22	+15	37	Qualification for Relegation play-out
8	Reșița	21	10	3	8	35	29	+6	33	Qualification for Relegation play-out
9	Bacău	21	9	6	6	28	26	+2	33	Qualification for Relegation play-out
10	Metalul Buzău	21	10	2	9	33	26	+7	32	Qualification for Relegation play-out
11	Politehnica Iași	21	9	4	8	25	22	+3	31	Qualification for Relegation play-out
12	Afumați	21	9	3	9	30	26	+4	30	Qualification for Relegation play-out
13	Concordia Chiajna	21	8	3	10	29	24	+5	27	Qualification for Relegation play-out
14	Gloria Bistrița	21	7	5	9	29	29	0	26	Qualification for Relegation play-out
15	Slatina	21	7	5	9	27	28	−1	26	Qualification for Relegation play-out
16	Dumbrăvița	21	7	4	10	25	33	−8	25	Qualification for Relegation play-out
17	1599 Șelimbăr	21	5	5	11	27	32	−5	20	Qualification for Relegation play-out
18	Ceahlăul Piatra Neamț	21	5	3	13	20	43	−23	18 (Note: Ceahlăul Piatra Neamț were deducted two points for failing to pay former player Ronald Gbizie. However, they recovered their points on 10 December 2025.)	Qualification for Relegation play-out
19	Dinamo București	21	3	7	11	19	35	−16	16	Qualification for Relegation play-out
20	Tunari	21	3	7	11	19	36	−17	16	Qualification for Relegation play-out
21	Olimpia Satu Mare	21	4	2	15	19	45	−26	14	Qualification for Relegation play-out
22	Câmpulung Muscel	21	2	4	15	10	53	−43	10	Qualification for Relegation play-out

Source: FRF (in Romanian)
Rules for classification: During Season: 1) Points, 2) Goal difference, 3) Goals scored. End of Season: 1) Points, 2) Head-to-head points, 3) Head-to-head goal difference, 4) Goal difference, 5) Goals scored

=== Results ===
Home \ Away	COR	SEP	CHI	BIH	VOL	STE	ASA	REȘ	BAC	MBZ	IAȘ	AFU	CON	GLO	SLA	DUM	ȘEL	CEA	DIN	TUN	STM	CMU
Corvinul Hunedoara			1–0	2–1	0–0	0–0			2–0			3–2				3–1	3–2		2–2	3–0		
Sepsi OSK Sfântu Gheorghe	0–2						0–0	5–0			1–0		3–1	1–1	3–2			1–0			1–0	2–0
Chindia Târgoviște		3–0 (Note: The initial result, 1–1, was overturned and awarded as a 3–0 win to Chindia, as Sepsi fielded an unlisted substitute.)		1–0	0–2	3–0			4–0	2–3		2–3				2–0	3–1		2–0	3–0		
Bihor Oradea		2–2			1–1	4–2	1–1		2–0	2–1		2–1				3–2	1–0		5–0	0–0		
Voluntari		1–2				2–0	3–3	3–2	1–2	2–1	0–0		1–0		1–0	3–1	0–0					
Steaua București		2–1					2–1	2–1			3–1		4–1	1–2	2–0	0–1	4–3	2–0				
ASA Târgu Mureș	0–0		0–2					0–2		1–0	4–0		0–0	3–0	3–2			3–0			4–0	3–0
Reșița	1–3		2–3	2–3						2–0	0–1		1–0	2–1	2–0			0–2			2–1	7–0
Bacău		0–2				3–2	3–0	0–0			1–2		1–1	1–1	3–2	1–0	1–1					
Metalul Buzău	0–1	0–0				1–1			0–1					1–4		5–1	1–0	2–1			0–1	4–0
Politehnica Iași	0–0		1–0	2–1						2–1				3–0	1–1			0–1	1–1	2–0	2–0	6–1
Afumați		2–2			0–1	0–1	2–1	2–3	3–2	0–2	2–0		1–2			0–1	1–0					
Concordia Chiajna	0–2		0–1	1–0						1–2	2–0			2–0	1–2			8–0	2–1		4–2	2–0
Gloria Bistrița	0–1		3–1	1–3	1–0							1–1						2–0	2–1	2–2	0–1	6–0
Slatina	0–1		1–1	2–0						2–3		0–2		0–0				2–1	2–0	1–1	3–1	0–0
Dumbrăvița		1–2					2–3	1–3			1–0		1–0	2–1	1–2		1–1	1–1				0–0
1599 Șelimbăr		0–2					1–3	1–1			2–1		1–0	3–1	1–2			3–1			1–1	5–0
Ceahlăul Piatra Neamț	2–3		0–0	0–3	1–5				1–5			1–2							3–0	1–1	1–0	3–0
Dinamo București		1–2			0–0	0–0	0–2	1–1	1–1	0–2		0–0				1–2	4–1			3–1		
Tunari		0–2			2–1	1–3	1–2	0–1	1–2	2–4		0–2	1–1			1–1	1–0					
Olimpia Satu Mare	2–4		2–4	1–4	0–1	1–4			0–1			2–1				1–4			2–0	1–1		
Câmpulung Muscel	0–1		1–1	2–1	0–2	0–1			0–0			0–3							2–3	1–3	3–0	

Source: FRF
Legend: Blue = home team win; Yellow = draw; Red = away team win.

== Promotion play-off ==
A promotion play-off tournament between the best 6 teams (after 21 rounds) will be played to decide the two teams that will be promoted to Liga I, meanwhile the third-placed and fourth-placed teams would play another play-off match against the 13th-placed and 14th-placed teams from Liga I. The teams will start the promotion play-offs with all the points accumulated in the regular season.

=== Play-off table ===
Pos	Team	Pld	W	D	L	GF	GA	GD	Pts	Promotion or qualification
1	Corvinul Hunedoara (C, P)	10	5	1	4	12	7	+5	69	Promotion to Liga I
2	Sepsi Sfântu Gheorghe (P)	10	6	2	2	14	7	+7	64 (Note: Sepsi OSK is ahead of Voluntari on points from the regular season.)	Promotion to Liga I
3	FC Voluntari (O, P)	10	8	1	1	17	6	+11	64	Qualification for play-offs
4	Bihor Oradea (Note: Bihor Oradea was ineligible for promotion after failing to obtain the Liga I license due to the absence of registered women's youth teams (U13 and U15).)	10	3	2	5	15	20	−5	50	
5	Steaua București (Note: Steaua București was ineligible for promotion due to being owned by a governmental entity, as Liga I clubs must be privately owned.)	10	3	1	6	11	15	−4	49	
6	Chindia Târgoviște	10	1	1	8	6	20	−14	43	Qualification for play-offs

Source: FRF
Rules for classification: 1) Points; 2) Points in the regular season; 3) Head-to-head points; 4) Head-to-head goal difference; 5) Head-to-head goals scored; 6) Head-to-head away goals scored; 7) Goal difference (regular season + play off); 8) Goals scored (regular season + play off); 9) Play-off.
(C) Champions; (O) Play-off winners; (P) Promoted

=== Play-off results ===
Home \ Away	COR	SEP	VOL	BIH	STE	CHI
Corvinul Hunedoara		0–1	2–0	1–1	1–0	2–0
Sepsi OSK Sfântu Gheorghe	2–1		1–1	3–0	2–0	1–1
Voluntari	1–0	2–0		2–1	2–0	5–1
Bihor Oradea	1–3	3–2	0–2		3–3	3–1
Steaua București	1–3	0–2	2–4	3–1		2–0
Chindia Târgoviște	1–0	0–1	1–2	1–3	1–2	

Source: FRF
Legend: Blue = home team win; Yellow = draw; Red = away team win.

== Relegation play-out ==
A relegation play-out tournament between the last 16 ranked teams at the end of the regular season decide the five teams that will be relegated to Liga III. Two play-out groups were made: the first group consisted of teams ranked 7, 10, 11, 14, 15, 18, 19 and 22, and the second group consisted of teams ranked 8, 9, 12, 13, 16, 17, 20 and 21, at the end of the regular season. The teams started the relegation play-out with all the points accumulated in the regular season. Two teams from each group were relegated to Liga III.

=== Group A ===
Table

Pos	Team	Pld	W	D	L	GF	GA	GD	Pts	Qualification or relegation
1	ASA Târgu Mureș	7	4	2	1	16	7	+9	51	
2	Metalul Buzău	7	6	0	1	16	6	+10	50	
3	Slatina	7	5	2	0	13	4	+9	43	
4	Politehnica Iași	7	3	1	3	7	6	+1	41	
5	Gloria Bistrița	7	2	2	3	10	8	+2	34	
6	Dinamo București (R)	7	3	0	4	9	10	−1	25	Qualification for relegation play-offs
7	Ceahlăul Piatra Neamț (R)	7	0	2	5	4	19	−15	20	Relegation to Liga III
8	Câmpulung Muscel (R)	7	0	1	6	4	19	−15	11	Relegation to Liga III

Source: FRF
Rules for classification: 1) Points; 2) Points in the regular season; 3) Head-to-head points; 4) Head-to-head goal difference; 5) Head-to-head goals scored; 6) Head-to-head away goals scored; 7) Goal difference (regular season + play out); 8) Goals scored (regular season + play out); 9) Play-off.
(R) Relegated

Results

Home \ Away	ASA	MBZ	SLA	IAȘ	GLO	DIN	CEA	CMU
ASA Târgu Mureș		1–4			1–1		4–0	6–1
Metalul Buzău			1–3	2–0		4–2		1–0
Slatina	0–0			1–0			1–1	
Politehnica Iași	0–1				2–2		3–0	1–0
Gloria Bistrița		0–1	1–2			0–2		3–0
Dinamo București	1–3		1–2	0–1				
Ceahlăul Piatra Neamț		0–3			0–3	0–2		
Câmpulung Muscel			0–4			0–1	3–3	

Source: FRF
Legend: Blue = home team win; Yellow = draw; Red = away team win.

=== Group B ===
Table

Pos	Team	Pld	W	D	L	GF	GA	GD	Pts	Qualification or relegation
1	Bacău	7	3	0	4	7	11	−4	42	
2	Concordia Chiajna	7	4	2	1	10	5	+5	41	
3	Reșița	7	2	1	4	6	10	−4	40	
4	Afumați	7	2	1	4	8	9	−1	37	
5	Dumbrăvița	7	2	1	4	6	7	−1	32	
6	1599 Șelimbăr (O)	7	3	1	3	8	9	−1	30	Qualification for relegation play-offs
7	Olimpia Satu Mare (R)	7	4	2	1	16	9	+7	28	Relegation to Liga III
8	Tunari (R)	7	3	2	2	9	10	−1	27	Relegation to Liga III

Source: FRF
Rules for classification: 1) Points; 2) Points in the regular season; 3) Head-to-head points; 4) Head-to-head goal difference; 5) Head-to-head goals scored; 6) Head-to-head away goals scored; 7) Goal difference (regular season + play out); 8) Goals scored (regular season + play out); 9) Play-off.
(O) Play-off winners; (R) Relegated

Results

Home \ Away	BAC	CON	REȘ	AFU	DUM	STM	ȘEL	TUN
Bacău				3–1	1–0	1–3		1–0
Concordia Chiajna	2–0				1–0	2–2		1–1
Reșița	1–0	1–2				2–0	0–2	
Afumați		1–0	1–1			1–3	0–1	
Dumbrăvița			2–0	1–0			0–0	
Olimpia Satu Mare					3–2		4–0	1–1
1599 Șelimbăr	4–1	0–2						1–2
Tunari			3–1	0–4	2–1			

Source: FRF
Legend: Blue = home team win; Yellow = draw; Red = away team win.

== Liga II play-out ==
The 6th-placed teams of the Liga II relegation play-out groups face each other in order to determine the last relegated team to Liga III.

Team 1	Agg.	Team 2	1st leg	2nd leg
Dinamo București	1–3	1599 Șelimbăr	1–1	0–2

First leg

16 May 2026	Dinamo București	1–1	1599 Șelimbăr	Buftea
11:00 EEST (UTC+3)	Matei 86'	Report	Buzan 90+4'	Stadium: CNAF; Referee: Claudiu Gaitin

Second leg

23 May 2026	1599 Șelimbăr	2–0	Dinamo București	Cisnădie
11:00 EEST (UTC+3)	Petrescu 74'; Vuc 84'	Report		Stadium: Măgura; Referee: Viorel Flueran

== Season statistics ==
Regular season, promotion play-off and relegation play-out overall statistics

=== Top scorers ===
As of 16 May 2026

Rank	Player	Club	Regular	Play-off	Play-out	Total
1	(Romania) Valentin Robu	Metalul Buzău	13	0	4	17
2	(Romania) Cristian Măgerușan	ASA Târgu Mureș	11	0	5	16
2	(Romania) Bogdan Chipirliu	Steaua București	10	6	0	16
2	(Spain) Nacho Heras	Sepsi OSK	13	3	0	16
5	(Romania) Nicu Modan	Reșița	11	0	3	14
6	(Ghana) Carl Davordzie	Ceahlăul Piatra Neamț / Sepsi OSK (Note: Carl Davordzie was transferred to Sepsi OSK Sfântu Gheorghe during the winter transfer window, having scored 10 goals for Ceahlăul.)	10	3	0	13
7	(Spain) Rubio	Steaua București	9	3	0	12
7	(Romania) Ioan Hora	Bihor Oradea	9	3	0	12
9	(Romania) Dragoș Tescan	Bihor Oradea	7	4	0	11
10	(Romania) Daniel Florea	Chindia Târgoviște	10	0	0	10
10	(Romania) Robert Jerdea	Reșița	10	0	0	10
10	(Portugal) Sérgio Ribeiro	Corvinul Hunedoara	8	2	0	10
10	(Romania) Cosmin Bucuroiu	1599 Șelimbăr	8	0	2	10
10	(Romania) Claudiu Dragu	Tunari	9	0	1	10
15	(Guinea) Sekou Camara	Politehnica Iași	6	0	3	9
16	(Croatia) Matko Babić	Voluntari	6	2	0	8
16	(Romania) Andrei Pavel	Bacău	7	0	1	8
16	(Romania) Alexandru Saim Tudor	Metalul Buzău	7	0	1	8
16	(Equatorial Guinea) Óscar Siafá	Slatina	5	0	3	8
16	(Cameroon) Serge Ekollo	ASA Târgu Mureș	5	0	3	8
16	(Romania) Filip Ilie	Corvinul Hunedoara	7	1	3	8

=== Hat-tricks ===
As of 16 May 2026

Player	For	Against	Result	Date	Round
(Nigeria) Kehinde Fatai	Afumați	Bacău	3–2 (H)	2 August 2025	1
(Romania) Cristian Măgerușan	ASA Târgu Mureș	Câmpulung Muscel	3–0 (H)	30 August 2025	5
(Romania) Cosmin Bucuroiu	1599 Șelimbăr	Câmpulung Muscel	5–0 (H)	4 October 2025	9
(Romania) Valentin Robu (Note: Player scored four goals.)	Metalul Buzău	Dumbrăvița	5–1 (H)	18 October 2025	10
(Romania) Bogdan Chipirliu	Olimpia Satu Mare	Steaua București	1–4 (A)	25 October 2025	11
(Norway) Moses Mawa	Sepsi OSK Sfântu Gheorghe	Reșița	5–0 (H)	28 February 2026	19
(Guinea) Sekou Camara	Politehnica Iași	Câmpulung Muscel	6–1 (H)	7 March 2026	20
(Ivory Coast) Imrane Bamba	Tunari	Afumați	0–4 (A)	4 April 2026	2 (play-out)

== See also ==
- 2025–26 Liga I
- 2025–26 Liga III
- 2025–26 Liga IV
- 2025–26 Cupa României
