= 2026–27 SSU Politehnica Timișoara season =

SSU Politehnica Timișoara
2026–27 season
- Stadium: Electrica Stadium
- Liga 2: Pre-season
- Cupa României: Pre-season

The 2026–27 season is the 106th season in the history of Asociația Club Sportiv Știința Politehnica Timișoara and their first season in Liga II, the Romanian second division, since 2023 following promotion. The club will also participate in the Cupa României.

== Transfers ==
=== In ===
Pos.	Player	Transferred from	Fee	Date	Source
DF	(Hungary) András Huszti	(Romania) Steaua București		1 July 2026	

== Pre-season ==
4 July 2026 Friendly	Politehnica Timișoara (Romania)	1–0	(Romania) Dumbrăvița	Timișoara
12:00 UTC+3	56'			Stadium: Electrica Stadium

21 July 2026 Friendly	Politehnica Timișoara (Romania)	0–0	(Saudi Arabia) Al Shabab

22 July 2026 Friendly	Lecce (Italy)	v	(Romania) Politehnica Timișoara
17:30

=== Liga II ===
Notes

(Note: 1599 Șelimbăr, Afumați, Cetatea Suceava, Dinamo București, Dumbrăvița, Gloria Bistrița, Olimpia Satu Mare, Popești-Leordeni, Râmnicu Vâlcea, Slatina, Steaua București and Ștefăneștii de Jos are ineligible for promotion due to their legal status.): No promotion

Pos	Team	Pld	W	D	L	GF	GA	GD	Pts	Qualification
1	Chindia Târgoviște	13	10	0	3	34	15	+19	30	Qualification for Promotion play-off
2	Politehnica Timișoara	12	8	4	0	23	10	+13	28	Qualification for Promotion play-off
3	Slatina	13	9	1	3	21	12	+9	28	Qualification for Promotion play-off
4	Popești-Leordeni	13	8	3	2	29	20	+9	27	Qualification for Promotion play-off
5	Concordia Chiajna	13	8	1	4	33	19	+14	25	Qualification for Promotion play-off

Updated to match(es) played on 7 November 2026. Source: FRF (in Romanian)
Rules for classification: During season: 1) Points; 2) Goal difference; 3) Goals scored. End of season: 1) Points; 2) Head-to-head points; 3) Head-to-head goal difference; 4) Goal difference; 5) Goals scored

==== Results by round ====
Round	1	2	3	4	5	6	7	8	9	10	11	12	13	14	15	16	17	18	19	20	21
Ground	H	A	H	A	H	A	H	A	H	A	H	A	H	A	H	A	H	H	A	H	A
Result																					
Position																					

Updated to match(es) played on 22 July 2026. Source: Politehnica Timișoara
A = Away; H = Home; W = Win; D = Draw; L = Loss

== Competitions ==
=== Matches ===
4 August 2026 1	Politehnica Timișoara	1-0	Chindia Târgoviște	Timișoara
18:00 UTC+3	Călin Toma (yellow card) 26'; Huszti 29' (yellow card) 90+5'; Doană (yellow card) 68'; Benzar (yellow card) 81'	Report	Rareș Mihai (yellow card) 37'; Celea (yellow card) 44'; Neguț (yellow card) 81'; Mario Brumă (yellow card) 81'; Bogdan Petre (yellow card) 90+5'	Stadium: Electrica Stadium

8 August 2026 2	CSC Șelimbăr	1-1	Politehnica Timișoara	Cisnădie
11:00	Luca (yellow card) 21'; Bucuroiu 56'; Wiktorski (yellow card) 89'	Report	Pedro Paul (yellow card) 57'; Chițu (yellow card) 63'; Ștefanovici 83'	Stadium: Măgura Stadium

15 August 2026 3	Politehnica Timișoara	1-0	Unirea Slobozia	Timișoara
11:00	Pedro Paul (yellow card) 46'; Călin Toma (yellow card) 65'; Iosif Rotariu 87'	Report	Lazăr (yellow card) 43'; Gabriel Lazăr (yellow card) 60'; Deimantas Rimpa (yellow card) 78'; Ventura (yellow card) 81' (yellow-red card) 82'; Robert Necșulescu (yellow card) 90+2'	Stadium: Electrica Stadium

22 August 2026 4	Concordia Chiajna	1-5	Politehnica Timișoara	Chiajna
11:00 EEST				Stadium: Concordia Stadium

29 August 2026 5	Politehnica Timișoara	v	ASA Târgu Mureș	Timișoara
				Stadium: Electrica Stadium

5 September 2026 6	FC Hermannstadt	v	Politehnica Timișoara	Sibiu
				Stadium: Municipal

12 September 2026 7	Politehnica Timișoara	v	CSL Ștefăneștii de Jos	Timișoara
				Stadium: Electrica Stadium

19 September 2026 8	SC Popești-Leordeni	v	Politehnica Timișoara	Clinceni
				Stadium: Clinceni Arena

10 October 2026 9	Politehnica Timișoara	v	Steaua București	Timișoara
				Stadium: Electrica Stadium

17 October 2026 10	SCM Râmnicu Vâlcea	v	Politehnica Timișoara	Râmnicu Vâlcea
				Stadium: Municipal–1 Mai

24 October 2026 11	Politehnica Timișoara	v	FC Bacău	Timișoara
				Stadium: Electrica Stadium

31 October 2026 12	CSC Dumbrăvița	v	Politehnica Timișoara	Dumbrăvița
				Stadium: Ștefan Dobay

7 November 2026 13	Politehnica Timișoara	v	CSM Reșița	Timișoara
				Stadium: Electrica Stadium

21 November 2026 14	Cetatea Suceava	v	Politehnica Timișoara	Suceava
				Stadium: Areni

28 November 2026 15	Politehnica Timișoara	v	FC Bihor Oradea	Timișoara
				Stadium: Electrica Stadium

5 December 2026 16	Gloria Bistrița	v	Politehnica Timișoara	Bistrița
				Stadium: Jean Pădureanu

12 December 2026 17	Politehnica Timișoara	v	CSM Slatina	Timișoara
				Stadium: Electrica Stadium

20 February 2027 18	Politehnica Timișoara	v	Metaloglobus București	Timișoara
				Stadium: Electrica Stadium

27 February 2027 19	CS Afumați	v	Politehnica Timișoara	Afumați
				Stadium: Comunal

6 March 2027 20	Politehnica Timișoara	v	CS Dinamo București	Timișoara
				Stadium: Electrica Stadium

13 March 2027 21	Metalul Buzău	v	Politehnica Timișoara	Buzău
				Stadium: Cornel Negoescu
