= Pedro Albino =

Portuguese footballer (born 1998)

Personal information
- Full name: Pedro Emanuel de Sousa Albino
- Date of birth: 21 December 1998 (age 27)
- Place of birth: Olhão, Portugal
- Height: 1.70 m (5 ft 7 in)
- Position: Right-back

Team information
- Current team: Bihor Oradea
- Number: 20

Youth career
- 2006–2007: Marítimo Olhanense
- 2007–2009: Sporting CP
- 2009–2011: AA Sporting Faro
- 2011–2016: Olhanense
- 2018–2020: Estoril

Senior career*
Years	Team	Apps	(Gls)
2016–2018	Olhanense	33	(0)
2020–2021	Olhanense	25	(0)
2021–2022	Amora	13	(2)
2022	Farense	10	(0)
2023	União de Leiria	9	(0)
2023–2024	Ceahlăul Piatra Neamț	24	(1)
2024	CSM Focșani	13	(2)
2025–2026	Corvinul Hunedoara	41	(5)
2026–	Bihor Oradea	10	(1)
- * Club domestic league appearances and goals as of 31 October 2026

Pedro Emanuel de Sousa Albino (born 21 December 1998) is a Portuguese professional footballer who plays as a right-back for Liga II club Bihor Oradea.

== Career ==
On 8 May 2016, Albino made his professional debut with Olhanense in a 2015–16 Segunda Liga match against Leixões.

On 28 December 2022, he signed with União de Leiria until the end of the season, with an option to extend.

On 20 July 2023, Albino signed for Romania's Liga II side Ceahlaul.

== Honours ==
Leiria

- Liga 3: 2022–23

Corvinul Hunedoara

- Liga II: 2025–26
