= AFC Câmpulung Muscel =

Romanian football club

- Full name: Asociația Fotbal Club Câmpulung Muscel 2022
- Nicknames: Muscelenii (The People from Muscel)
- Short name: Muscel
- Founded: 1978; 48 years ago as CS Rucăr
- Dissolved: 2026
- Ground: Muscelul
- Capacity: 6,000 (3,000 seated)
- 2025–26: Liga II; Regular season: 22nd of 22; Play-out, Group A: 8th (relegated)

Asociația Fotbal Club Câmpulung Muscel 2022, also known as AFC Câmpulung Muscel or simply Câmpulung Muscel, was a Romanian professional football club based in Câmpulung, Argeș County.

Founded in 1978 as CS Rucăr, the club moved to Câmpulung in 2022 and changed its name to Muscelul Câmpulung Elite following promotion from the 2021–22 season. Subsequently renamed AFC Câmpulung Muscel, the team earned promotion to Liga II for the first time in its history at the end of the 2023–24 season.

== History ==
AFC Câmpulung Muscel, originally founded in 1978 as CS Rucăr, competed in the Argeș County Championships, playing its home matches at the Central Stadium in Rucăr, where Romanian international Dan Nistor began his career in 2005.

In the 2009–10 season, under the guidance of Mihai Poștoacă and with some experienced second-tier players such as Bădescu, Craioveanu, Murineanu, Fl. Coman, and Lipă, Rucărenii finished in 2nd place, just two points behind Atletic Bradu.

The following season, with former Farul Constanța captain Alecsandru Popovici as head coach, Rucăr won the Liga IV Argeș County, earning promotion to Liga III after a 2–1 victory in the promotion play-off against Sevișul Șelimbăr, the Liga IV Sibiu County winners, at the Complex Sportiv Hidro in Râmnicu Vâlcea. The squad included, among others, Ad. Tănase, Diaconu, Vaciu, Slăninoiu, Bondac, A. Popescu, Mihăilescu, Bălașa, Anghelina, I. Ion, Idor, Craioveanu, Rădescu, Baicu, Mălușanu, Moroe, Morcoană, and Dalu.

However, faced with financial difficulties, CS Rucăr withdrew from Liga III and subsequently continued to compete in Liga IV Argeș County. In 2011–12 season, the team finished as runners-up, just four points behind SCM Pitești, but struggled to achieve notable results in the following seasons, finishing 5th in 2012–13, 13th in 2013–14, 9th in 2014–15, 11th in 2015–16, and 13th in 2016–17. Eventually, ongoing financial problems led to a withdrawal from the fourth tier.

The club then spent the following two seasons in the North Series of Liga V Argeș, the second county level and fifth tier of Romanian football, finishing 10th in the first season and earning promotion back to Liga IV Argeș County after winning the series in the 2018–19 season.

In the 2019–20 season, CS Rucăr were in 6th place in Liga IV Argeș when the season was suspended in March 2020 due to the COVID-19 pandemic in Romania. The club did not participate in the 2020–21 short season due to the financial burden of complying with the medical protocol imposed by the Romanian Football Federation.

Rucăr started the 2021–22 season with Bogdan Simion as head coach but replaced him in the second half of the season with Valentin Cocoș, who led the team to a county title, one point ahead of Inter Câmpulung, and secured promotion to the third league after defeating Dunărea Calafat, the Dolj County winners, following a 1–1 draw in Calafat and a 1–0 victory at Muscelul Stadium in Câmpulung. The squad included, among others, Vălimăreanu, Chirciu, Nica, Bălan, Turcin, Ghiță, Cataramă, Cr. Tănase, Ciorciovel, Neacșu, Dobre, Marinescu, Luca, Dascălu, Pătrănoiu, and brothers Gabriel and Ionuț Jenaru.

After earning promotion to Liga III, the club was relocated to Câmpulung and renamed Muscelul Câmpulung Elite. Also, Alecsandru Popovici was appointed as the new head coach for the 2022–23 season. However, after a disappointing start, earning only four points in four matches, he was dismissed and replaced by Vasile Slăninoiu as player-coach. Slăninoiu led the team to a 9th-place finish in the first stage and 8th after the play-out round, barely avoiding relegation after being deducted three points following their withdrawal from the field in a match against Unirea Bascov.

In the 2023–24 season, the club was renamed AFC Câmpulung Muscel and appointed Costin Lazăr as the new head coach. Although the team was in 1st place after ten rounds, Lazăr was dismissed. Vasile Slăninoiu served as interim coach until January 2024, when Mircea Diaconescu took over, leading the team to finish 1st in the first stage of Series V. However, Lazăr returned in April, guiding the team to stay at the top of the table and, after the series play-off round, securing qualification for the promotion play-offs. Câmpulung Muscel earned promotion to Liga II at the end of the season, defeating Vedița Colonești after a 0–0 away draw and a 2–1 home win after extra time, and Râmnicu Vâlcea with a 2–1 away win and a 0–0 home draw.

The club's first-ever season in Liga II, marked by numerous managerial changes, started poorly, as Costin Lazăr was dismissed after five rounds, with the team in the lower part of the table on only three points, and was replaced by Marius Bratu as head coach, assisted by Marian Rada as technical director. However, both were dismissed after the twelfth round following a 1–2 defeat against Afumați. Following a short interim spell under Vasile Slăninoiu, Sorin Colceag was appointed as the new head coach in late November, but he parted ways with the club at the end of the regular season, leaving the team in 20th place. He was replaced by Alecsandru Popovici, who led the team during the play-out stage, where it finished last in Group B and was relegated.

However, following the withdrawal and exclusion of Gloria Buzău and FCU 1948 Craiova, Câmpulung Muscel was spared from relegation and began the 2025–26 campaign with Alecsandru Popovici as head coach. During the winter break, Popovici became technical director, while Croatians Goran Miscević and Konstantin Durić took charge of the team. However, with the team placed 22nd, they were replaced one round before the end of the regular season by Serbian coach Vladislav Rosić. Rosić resigned after two rounds of the play-out stage, leaving assistant coach Vasile Slăninoiu to lead the team until the end of the season, as the club finished bottom of Group A and was relegated from Liga II for the second consecutive year.

Chronology of names
Name	Period
CS Rucăr	1978–2022
Muscelul Câmpulung Elite	2022–2023
AFC Câmpulung Muscel	2023–2026

== Grounds ==
The club initially played its home matches at the Central Stadium in Rucăr, which had a capacity of 150. Following the club's relocation to Câmpulung in 2022, it began playing its home matches at Muscelul Stadium, a multi-use stadium in Câmpulung, also used by ARO Muscelul Câmpulung. The stadium has a capacity of 6,000 spectators, of which 3,000 are seated. It was opened in the 1940s and most recently renovated in 2008.

== Honours ==
Liga III

- Winners (1): 2023–24

Liga IV – Argeș County

- Winners (2): 2010–11, 2021–22
- Runners-up (2): 2009–10, 2011–12

Liga V – Argeș County

- Winners (1): 2018–19

== Former managers ==
- (Romania) Bogdan Simion (2021)
- (Romania) Valentin Cocoș (2022)
- (Romania) Alecsandru Popovici (2022)
- (Romania) Vasile Slăninoiu (2022–2023) player-coach
- (Romania) Costin Lazăr (2023)
- (Romania) Vasile Slăninoiu (2023) interim
- (Romania) Mircea Diaconescu (2024)
- (Romania) Costin Lazăr (2024)
- (Romania) Marius Bratu (2024)
- (Romania) Vasile Slăninoiu (2024) interim
- (Romania) Sorin Colceag (2024–2025)
- (Romania) Alecsandru Popovici (2025)
- (Croatia) Goran Miscević (2026)
- (Serbia) Vladislav Rosić (2026)
- (Romania) Vasile Slăninoiu (2026) interim

== League and cup history ==
Season	Tier	League	Place	Notes	Cupa României
2025–26	2	Liga II	8th (play-out)	Relegated	Play-off round
2024–25	2	Liga II	7th (play-out)	Spared from relegation	Play-off round
2023–24	3	Liga III (Seria V)	1st (C)	Promoted	Third round
2022–23	3	Liga III (Seria IV)	7th		
2021–22	4	Liga IV (AG)	1st (C)	Promoted	
2020–21	Not active				
2019–20	4	Liga IV (AG)	6th		
2018–19	5	Liga V (AG)	1st (C)	Promoted	
2017–18	5	Liga V (AG)	10th		
2016–17	4	Liga IV (AG)	13th	Relegated	
2015–16	4	Liga IV (AG)	11th		
2014–15	4	Liga IV (AG)	9th		
2013–14	4	Liga IV (AG)	13th		
2012–13	4	Liga IV (AG)	5th		
2011–12	4	Liga IV (AG)	2nd		
2010–11	4	Liga IV (AG)	1st (C)		
2009–10	4	Liga IV (AG)	2nd		
