= Denis Rența =

Romanian professional footballer

Personal information
- Full name: Denis Florin Rența
- Date of birth: 26 April 2004 (age 22)
- Place of birth: Brașov, Romania
- Height: 1.79 m (5 ft 10 in)
- Position: Defensive midfielder

Team information
- Current team: CS Dinamo București
- Number: 13

Youth career
- –2023: Sepsi OSK

Senior career*
Years	Team	Apps	(Gls)
2023–2025	Sepsi OSK	10	(0)
2024–2025	→ CSM Focșani (loan)	22	(1)
2025–2026	Corvinul Hunedoara	5	(0)
2026–	CS Dinamo București	10	(2)

International career^{‡}
2023–2025	Romania U20	5	(0)
- * Club domestic league appearances and goals as of 30 October 2026 ‡ National team caps and goals as of 25 March 2025

Denis Florin Rența (born 26 April 2004) is a Romanian professional footballer who plays as a defensive midfielder for Liga II club CS Dinamo București.

== Club career ==
=== Sepsi OSK ===
He made his official debut for Sepsi OSK in the Cupa României draw against Hermannstadt on 27 September 2023. He made his Liga I debut for Sepsi OSK against Politehnica Iași on 19 October 2023.

== Career statistics ==
As of match played 30 October 2026

Appearances and goals by club, season and competition
Club	Season	League			Cupa României		Europe		Other		Total	
Club	Season	Division	Apps	Goals	Apps	Goals	Apps	Goals	Apps	Goals	Apps	Goals
Sepsi OSK	2023–24	Liga I	10	0	2	0	0	0	0	0	12	0
CSM Focşani (loan)	2024–25	Liga II	22	1	1	0	—		—		23	1
Corvinul Hunedoara	2025–26	Liga II	5	0	2	0	—		—		7	0
CS Dinamo București	2027–26	Liga II	10	2	0	0	—		—		10	2
Career total			47	3	5	0	0	0	0	0	52	3

== Honours ==
Corvinul Hunedoara

- Liga II: 2025–26
