= Iustin Chirilă =

Romanian footballer

Personal information
- Full name: Iustin Constantin Chirilă
- Date of birth: 21 May 2006 (age 20)
- Place of birth: Sibiu, Romania
- Height: 1.92 m (6 ft 4 in)
- Position: Goalkeeper

Team information
- Current team: Bihor Oradea (on loan from Universitatea Cluj)
- Number: 1

Youth career
- –2021: Interstar Sibiu
- 2021–2024: Universitatea Cluj

Senior career*
Years	Team	Apps	(Gls)
2023–	Universitatea Cluj	3	(0)
2024–2025	→ Voluntari (loan)	21	(0)
2026	→ CSM Reșița (loan)	7	(0)
2026–	→ Bihor Oradea (loan)	10	(0)

International career^{‡}
2025–	Romania U20	2	(0)
- * Club domestic league appearances and goals as of 31 October 2026 ‡ National team caps and goals as of 17 November 2025

Iustin Constantin Chirilă (born 21 May 2006) is a Romanian professional footballer who plays as a goalkeeper for Liga II club Bihor Oradea, on loan from Liga I club Universitatea Cluj.

== Career statistics ==
As of 31 October 2026

Appearances and goals by club, season and competition
Club	Season	League			Cupa României		Europe		Other		Total	
Club	Season	Division	Apps	Goals	Apps	Goals	Apps	Goals	Apps	Goals	Apps	Goals
Universitatea Cluj	2023–24	Liga I	0	0	0	0	—		0	0	0	0
Universitatea Cluj	2025–26	Liga I	3	0	0	0	0	0	—		3	0
Universitatea Cluj	Total		3	0	0	0	0	0	0	0	3	0
Voluntari (loan)	2024–25	Liga II	21	0	0	0	—		0	0	21	0
CSM Reșița (loan)	2025–26	Liga II	7	0	—		—		—		7	0
Bihor Oradea (loan)	2026–27	Liga II	10	0	2	0	—		—		12	0
Career total			41	0	2	0	—		0	0	43	0
