= Patrick Dulcea =

Romanian footballer (born 2005)

Personal information
- Full name: Patrick Adrian Dulcea
- Date of birth: 10 February 2005 (age 21)
- Place of birth: Satu Mare, Romania
- Height: 1.80 m (5 ft 11 in)
- Positions: Attacking midfielder; winger

Team information
- Current team: Argeș Pitești
- Number: 20

Youth career
- –2019: Școala de Fotbal Dănuț Coman
- 2015: → Academica Clinceni (loan)
- 2019–2023: Gheorghe Hagi Academy

Senior career*
Years	Team	Apps	(Gls)
2023–2024	Farul Constanța	0	(0)
2023–2024	→ Argeș Pitești (loan)	12	(3)
2024–	Argeș Pitești	19	(0)
2025–2026	→ Unirea Slobozia (loan)	31	(3)

International career^{‡}
2023	Romania U18	8	(0)
2023–2024	Romania U19	9	(1)
2025	Romania U20	1	(0)
- * Club domestic league appearances and goals as of 24 October 2026 ‡ National team caps and goals as of 13 October 2025

Patrick Adrian Dulcea (born 10 February 2005) is a Romanian professional footballer who plays as an attacking midfielder or a winger for Liga I club Argeș Pitești.

== Personal life ==
Dulcea's father, Adrian, was also a football player, currently he is the head coach of Liga II club CSM Slatina.

== Career statistics ==
=== Club ===
As of match played 28 October 2026

Appearances and goals by club, season and competition
Club	Season	League			Cupa României		Europe		Other		Total	
Club	Season	Division	Apps	Goals	Apps	Goals	Apps	Goals	Apps	Goals	Apps	Goals
Argeș Pitești (loan)	2023–24	Liga II	12	3	1	0	–		–		13	3
Argeș Pitești	2024–25	Liga II	13	0	4	0	–		–		17	0
Argeș Pitești	2026–27	Liga I	6	0	1	0	–		–		7	0
Argeș Pitești	Total		19	3	5	0	0	0	0	0	24	3
Unirea Slobozia (loan)	2025–26	Liga I	31	3	0	0	–		–		31	3
Career total			62	6	6	0	0	0	0	0	68	6

== Honours ==
Argeș Pitești

- Liga II: 2024–25
