= FC Bihor Oradea =

FC Bihor Oradea may refer to:

- FC Bihor Oradea (1958), a dissolved football club in Oradea, Romania
- FC Bihor Oradea (2022), phoenix football club in Oradea, Romania
