= George Leață =

Romanian professional footballer

Personal information
- Full name: George Iulian Leață
- Date of birth: 5 June 2004 (age 22)
- Place of birth: Mogoșani, Romania
- Height: 1.81 m (5 ft 11 in)
- Position: Attacking midfielder

Team information
- Current team: CS Dinamo București
- Number: 9

Youth career
- 2017–2019: Școala de Fotbal Dănuț Coman
- 2019–2021: Argeș Pitești
- 2021–2022: CFR Cluj

Senior career*
Years	Team	Apps	(Gls)
2022–2026	CFR Cluj	1	(0)
2022–2023	→ CSM Slatina (loan)	19	(1)
2024–2026	→ CSM Slatina (loan)	41	(6)
2026–	CS Dinamo București	6	(1)

International career
2022	Romania U18	1	(1)
2022	Romania U19	3	(0)
- * Club domestic league appearances and goals as of 30 October 2026

George Iulian Leață (born 5 June 2004) is a Romanian professional footballer who plays as an attacking midfielder for Liga II club CS Dinamo București.

== Club career ==
Leață made his debut for CFR Cluj on 22 May 2022, in a 3–1 Liga I loss to FCSB.

== Career statistics ==
As of match played 30 October 2026

Appearances and goals by club, season and competition
Club	Season	League			Cupa României		Continental		Other		Total	
Club	Season	Division	Apps	Goals	Apps	Goals	Apps	Goals	Apps	Goals	Apps	Goals
CFR Cluj	2021–22	Liga I	1	0	—		—		—		1	0
CSM Slatina (loan)	2022–23	Liga II	19	1	0	0	—		—		19	1
CSM Slatina (loan)	2023–24	Liga II	7	0	—		—		—		7	0
CSM Slatina (loan)	2024–25	Liga II	15	2	1	0	—		—		16	2
CSM Slatina (loan)	2025–26	Liga II	19	4	3	1	—		—		22	5
CSM Slatina (loan)	Total		60	7	4	1	—		—		64	8
CS Dinamo București	2026–27	Liga II	6	1	—		—		—		6	1
Career total			67	8	4	1	0	0	0	0	71	9

== Honours ==
CFR Cluj

- Liga I: 2021–22
