= Viorel Domocoș =

Romanian footballer

Personal information
- Date of birth: 11 April 1975 (age 51)
- Place of birth: Bratca, Romania
- Height: 1.80 m (5 ft 11 in)
- Position: Midfielder

Team information
- Current team: Bihor Oradea (assistant)

Youth career
- Bihor Oradea

Senior career*
Years	Team	Apps	(Gls)
1994–1995	Bihor Oradea	17	(2)
1995–1996	Tractorul Brașov	17	(1)
1996–1997	Brașov	6	(0)
1997	Național București	1	(0)
1998	Olimpia Satu Mare	3	(0)
1998	Bihor Oradea	17	(4)
1999–2000	Universitatea Craiova	53	(3)
2001	Yunnan Hongta	33	(6)
2002	Universitatea Craiova	11	(2)
2002	Dinamo București	6	(0)
2003	Yunnan Hongta	23	(6)
2003	Național București	19	(0)
2004	Chongqing Lifan		
2004–2005	Argeș Pitești	4	(0)
2005–2006	Digenis Morphou	15	(3)
2006–2007	Alki Larnaca		
Total		225	(27)

Managerial career
- 2011: Crișul Aleșd
- 2012–2013: Oșorhei (assistant)
- 2017–2018: Crișul Aleșd
- 2018–2019: Luceafărul Oradea (assistant)
- 2019: Turris Turnu Măgurele (assistant)
- 2019: Concordia Chiajna (assistant)
- 2020: Turris Turnu Măgurele (assistant)
- 2021–2022: Universitatea Cluj (assistant)
- 2023–2024: Concordia Chiajna (assistant)
- 2025–: Bihor Oradea (assistant)
- * Club domestic league appearances and goals

Viorel Domocoș (born 11 April 1975) is a Romanian former professional footballer who played as a midfielder, currently assistant coach at Liga II club Bihor Oradea.
