= Sérgio Ribeiro (footballer, born 1996) =

Portuguese footballer

Personal information
- Full name: Sérgio Miguel Hora Ribeiro
- Date of birth: 18 January 1996 (age 30)
- Place of birth: Mafamude, Portugal
- Height: 1.78 m (5 ft 10 in)
- Position: Winger

Team information
- Current team: Corvinul Hunedoara
- Number: 20

Youth career
- 2004–2006: Coimbrões
- 2003–2015: Porto
- 2011–2012: → Padroense (loan)

Senior career*
Years	Team	Apps	(Gls)
2015–2017	Porto B	28	(2)
2017	Vitória Guimarães B	4	(0)
2017–2020	Oliveirense	64	(5)
2020–2022	Universitatea Cluj	38	(7)
2022–2024	União de Leiria	25	(4)
2024–2025	Lusitânia	29	(7)
2025–	Corvinul Hunedoara	42	(12)

International career
2011	Portugal U15	2	(0)
2011–2012	Portugal U16	14	(2)
2012–2013	Portugal U17	19	(5)
2013–2014	Portugal U18	7	(1)
2014–2015	Portugal U19	5	(2)
2016	Portugal U20	7	(0)
- * Club domestic league appearances and goals as of 23 October 2026

Sérgio Miguel Hora Ribeiro (born 18 January 1996) is a Portuguese professional footballer who plays as a winger for Liga I club Corvinul Hunedoara.

== Club career ==
On 24 May 2015, Ribeiro made his professional debut with Porto B in a 2014–15 Segunda Liga match against Marítimo B. He went onto make 28 appearances and score 2 goals for Porto B between 2015 and 2017. On 31 January 2017, Ribeiro joined Primeira Liga side Vitória Guimarães. His first involvement with Vitória was with the club's reserve team, as he was an unused substitute in a LigaPro game versus Portimonense on 15 February.

On 31 January 2024, Ribeiro terminated his contract with Liga Portugal 2 club Leiria. A week later, he joined Liga 3 side Lusitânia.

== International career ==
Ribeiro has represented Portugal at various youth levels, including U17 and U19 level.

== Honours ==
Porto B

- LigaPro: 2015–16

União de Leiria

- Liga 3: 2022–23

Lusitânia

- Liga 3: 2024–25

Corvinul Hunedoara

- Liga II: 2025–26
