= Tăul lui Ghib =

- Location within Romania
- Location: Vașcău, Bihor County, Romania
- Coordinates: 46°25′36.25″N 22°26′53.95″E
- Type: sinkhole lake
- Max. length: 60 m (200 ft)
- Max. width: 20 m (66 ft)

Tăul lui Ghib is a sinkhole lake, located in the karst area West of the town of Vașcău in Bihor County, Romania.

The lake has a length of 60 m (200 ft) and a width of 20 m (66 ft) is a tourist attraction of the area.
