= Cosmin Năstăsie =

Romanian footballer

Personal information
- Full name: Cosmin Alin Năstăsie
- Date of birth: 22 June 1983 (age 43)
- Place of birth: Drăgășani, Romania
- Height: 1.79 m (5 ft 10 1/2 in)
- Position: Winger

Team information
- Current team: Unirea Bascov (manager)

Youth career
- 2002–2003: Internaţional

Senior career*
Years	Team	Apps	(Gls)
2003–2011	Argeș Pitești	203	(29)
2004–2005	→ Mioveni (loan)	7	(5)
2010–2011	→ Brașov (loan)	13	(0)
2012–2019	Mioveni	187	(57)
Total		410	(91)

Managerial career
- 2023–2024: Unirea Bascov U-17
- 2024–: Unirea Bascov
- * Club domestic league appearances and goals as of 10:42, 8 December 2024 (UTC) ‡ National team caps and goals as of 22 May 2011

Cosmin Alin Năstăsie (born 22 June 1983) is a Romanian former footballer who played as a winger for FC Argeș Pitești, CS Mioveni and FC Brașov.
