= Vașcău =

- Town
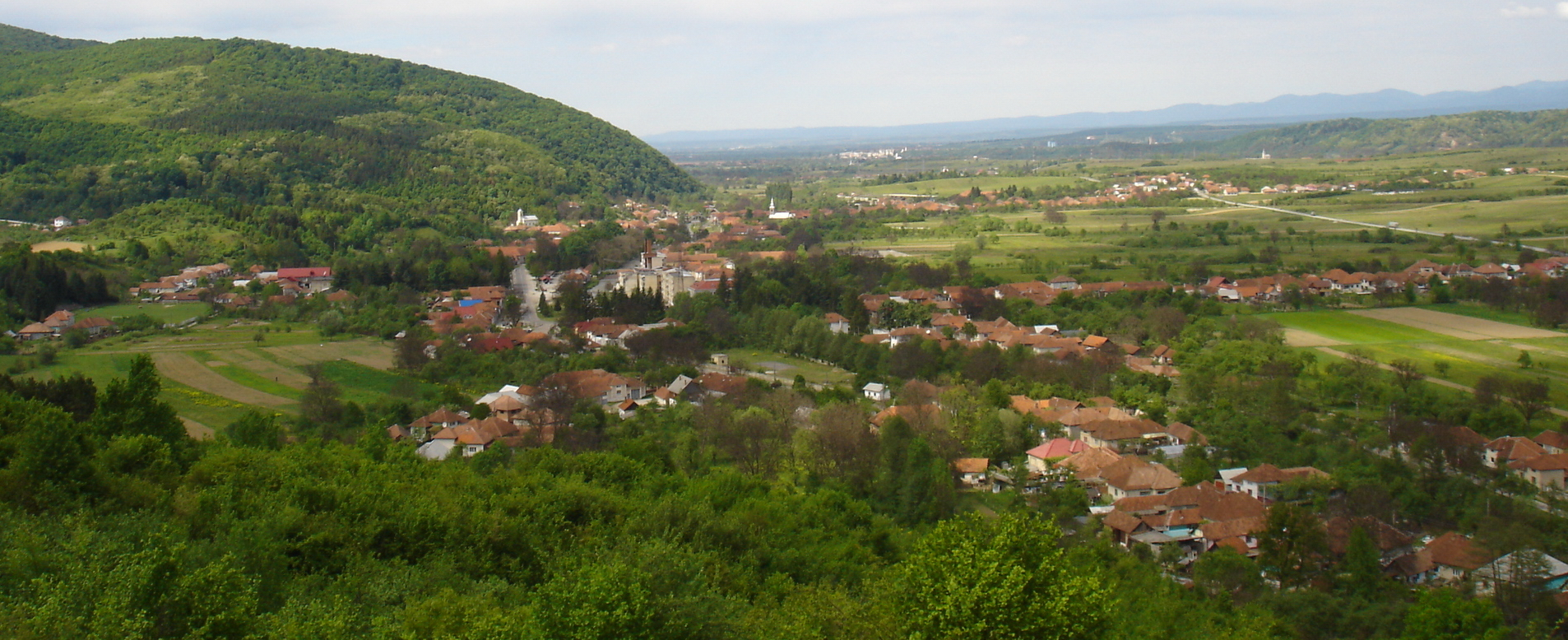

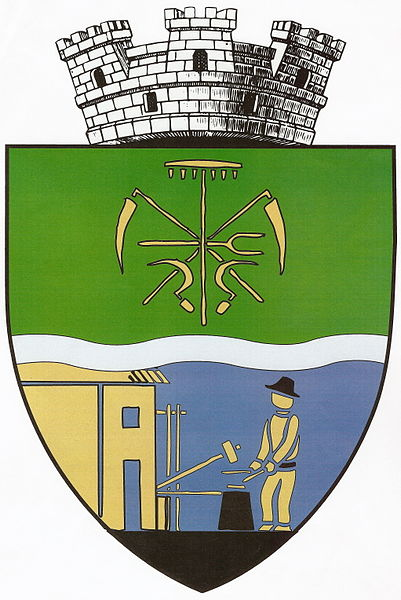
- Coat of arms

- Location in Bihor County

- Location in Romania
- Coordinates: 46°28′47″N 22°28′47″E
- Country: Romania
- County: Bihor

Government
  - Mayor (2024–2028): Sebastian-Alexandru Bursașiu (PSD)
- Area: 65.04 km^{2} (25.11 sq mi)
- Elevation: 290 m (950 ft)
- Population (2021-12-01): 2,025
  - Density: 31.13/km^{2} (80.64/sq mi)
- Time zone: UTC+02:00 (EET)
  - Summer (DST): UTC+03:00 (EEST)
- Postal code: 415800
- Area code: (+40) 02 59
- Vehicle reg.: BH
- Website: www.primaria-vascau.ro

Vașcău (Hungarian: Vaskoh) is a town in Bihor County, Crișana, Romania. It administers five villages: Câmp (Vaskohmező), Câmp-Moți, Colești (Kolafalva), Vărzarii de Jos (Alsófüves), and Vărzarii de Sus (Felsőfüves).

== Demographics ==
Historical population
Year	Pop.	±%
1880	2,570	—
1890	3,172	+23.4%
1900	3,504	+10.5%
1910	3,989	+13.8%
1920	3,897	−2.3%
1930	4,147	+6.4%
1941	4,213	+1.6%
1956	4,538	+7.7%
1966	3,621	−20.2%
1977	3,441	−5.0%
1992	3,337	−3.0%
2002	3,032	−9.1%
2011	2,291	−24.4%
2021	2,025	−11.6%
Source: Census data

According to the 2021 census, Vașcău has a population of 2,025. At the census from 2011, there were 2,315 people living within the town; of those, 96.63% were ethnic Romanians and 1.8% others.

== Natives ==
- Alexandru Andrițoiu (1929–1996), poet
- Alexandru Boc (born 1946), football player
- Lucian Ciocan (born 1968), football player and manager
- Marius Sala (1932–2018), linguist

== See also ==
- Tăul lui Ghib
