= Studina =

- Commune
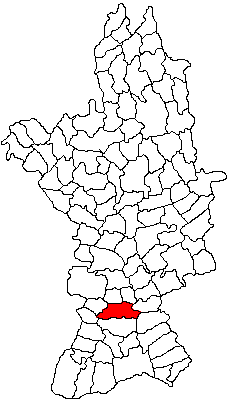
- Location in Olt County

- Location in Romania
- Coordinates: 43°58′N 24°25′E
- Country: Romania
- County: Olt
- Population (2021-12-01): 2,403
- Time zone: EET/EEST (UTC+2/+3)
- Vehicle reg.: OT

Studina is a commune in Olt County, Oltenia, Romania. It is composed of two villages, Studina and Studinița. It included three other villages until 2004, when they were split off to form Grădinile Commune.
