= Roberto Mălăele =

Romanian footballer

Personal information
- Full name: Roberto Leonard Mălăele
- Date of birth: 29 March 2003 (age 23)
- Place of birth: Târgu Jiu, Romania
- Height: 1.76 m (5 ft 9 in)
- Position: Central midfielder

Team information
- Current team: CS Dinamo București
- Number: 10

Youth career
- 2016–2022: Gheorghe Hagi Academy

Senior career*
| Years | Team | Apps | (Gls) |
| 2021–2023 | Farul Constanța | 1 | (0) |
| 2021–2023 | Farul II Constanța | 15 | (3) |
| 2024 | Voluntari II | 10 | (0) |
| 2024– | CS Dinamo București | 27 | (9) |

International career
| 2018 | Romania U15 | 2 | (0) |
| 2018–2019 | Romania U16 | 3 | (0) |
| 2019–2020 | Romania U17 | 4 | (2) |
| 2021 | Romania U18 | 2 | (0) |
- * Club domestic league appearances and goals as of 18 April 2026

Roberto Leonard Mălăele (born 29 March 2003) is a Romanian professional footballer who plays as a central midfielder for Liga II club CS Dinamo București.

== Club career ==
=== Viitorul Constanta ===
He made his debut on 25 October 2017 in Cupa Romaniei match against CSM Reșița, being, at 14 years, 6 month and 26 days, the youngest player who made his debut for Viitorul. He made his Liga I debut for Viitorul Constanța against UTA Arad on 18 July 2021.

== Personal life ==
He is the grandnephew of Romanian theater and film actor Horațiu Mălăele.

== Honours ==
CS Dinamo București

- Liga III: 2024–25
