= Andrei Pătrănoiu =

Romanian footballer

Personal information
- Full name: Marius Andrei Pătrănoiu
- Date of birth: 1 December 1993 (age 32)
- Place of birth: Pitești, Romania
- Position: Forward

Team information
- Current team: Urban Titu

Youth career
- LPS Pitești

Senior career*
Years	Team	Apps	(Gls)
2011	Dinamic Mioveni		
2012	Atletic Bradu		
2012	SCM Pitești		
2013	Atletic Bradu		
2013–2014	Alki Larnaca	12	(1)
2015	Viața Nouă Olteni		
2015–2016	Argeș 1953		
2016	Cozia Călimănești		
2017	Viitorul Dăești		
2017–2018	Steaua București		
2018	Atletic Bradu		
2019	Sporting Roșiori		
2019–2021	Inter Câmpulung	29	(14)
2021	→ ACS Bălilești (loan)	5	(3)
2022	Muscelul Câmpulung Elite	19	(6)
2023–	Urban Titu	0	(0)
- * Club domestic league appearances and goals as of 13:53, 29 November 2022 (UTC)

Marius Andrei Pătrănoiu (born 1 December 1993) is a Romanian footballer who plays for Urban Titu in the Liga IV.
