= Adrian Dulcea =

Romanian footballer (born 1978)

Personal information
- Full name: Pavel Adrian Dulcea
- Date of birth: 25 November 1978 (age 47)
- Place of birth: Călimănești, Romania
- Height: 1.82 m (6 ft 0 in)
- Position: Striker

Team information
- Current team: CSM Slatina (head coach)

Youth career
- –1995: FC Râmnicu Vâlcea

Senior career*
Years	Team	Apps	(Gls)
1995–1998	FC Râmnicu Vâlcea	3	(0)
1998	Gloria Bistriţa	6	(0)
1999	Unirea Dej	7	(1)
1999–2001	Olimpia Satu Mare	62	(17)
2001–2002	Győr	10	(2)
2002	Siófok	10	(7)
2002	CFR Cluj	11	(0)
2003–2004	Gaz Metan Mediaş	29	(9)
2004–2005	Olimpia Satu Mare	15	(10)
2005–2007	Jiul Petroşani	57	(8)
2007–2010	Argeş Piteşti	76	(28)
2010	Mioveni	14	(1)
2011	ALRO Slatina	20	(5)
2012–2013	Argeş Piteşti	29	(12)
2013–2015	SCM Pitești	20	(3)
2017–2018	Unirea Bascov	5	(5)
Total		374	(108)

Managerial career
- 2014–2015: SCM Piteşti (player/coach)
- 2015: SCM Pitești (assistant)
- 2015–2016: Argeș 1953 Pitești
- 2016: CSM Râmnicu Vâlcea
- 2016–2017: CSM Râmnicu Vâlcea (assistant)
- 2017: Atletic Bradu
- 2017–2018: Unirea Bascov (player/coach)
- 2018–2020: Unirea Bascov
- 2020: Argeș Pitești (caretaker)
- 2021–2023: Unirea Bascov
- 2022–2023: Romania U20 (assistant)
- 2023: Romania U18
- 2023–2024: Romania U19
- 2024–2025: Romania U18
- 2025–2026: Romania U19
- 2026–: CSM Slatina
- * Club domestic league appearances and goals

Pavel Adrian Dulcea (born 25 November 1978) is a Romanian former professional footballer who played as a striker, who is currently in charge of Liga II club CSM Slatina.

== Club career ==
Dulcea started his career in his hometown in the 1995–96 season, at FC Râmnicu Vâlcea in Divizia B. He was offered a contract by Salernitana after an international tournament played in Naples by his team but his family declined the offer.

After leaving Râmnicu Vâlcea in 1998 followed a period of almost ten years spent only with teams from Ardeal, with one exception, the 2001–02 season, where he spent time with the Hungarian teams Györ and Siófok. This being his only experiences outside of Romanian football. During this entire period of 10 years, he played for teams such as Gloria Bistrița, Unirea Dej, Olimpia Satu Mare, CFR Cluj, Gaz Metan Mediaș and Jiul Petroșani.

His debut in the Divizia A was in the 1998–99 season, when he played for Gloria Bistrița. He only played 6 games that season, failing to score a goal. Also in Bistrița, but in his second period at Gloria, he made his debut in the Europe. In the 2000–01 season he played in the UEFA Intertoto Cup against FC Jazz Pori from Finland.

He came to Argeș Pitești in the 2007. Argeș had been relegated to Liga II and were aiming for promotion. He had a good season, managing to score 14 goals in 22 matches. Thanks to his goals, he was nicknamed "Dulcea Boom Boom" by Arges fans. He played with FC Argeș in Liga I in the following season. He scored 7 times in 31 games, 2 of the goals being scored in the last leg, in Argeș's 5-2 victory over Dinamo București. He stayed with the team even in difficult moments. At the end of the 2008–09 season, Argeș was relegated due to the corruption scandal. Cornel Penescu, the owner of the club at that time, had been involved. Adrian remained with the team in the next season, in Liga II, where he played 23 matches and scored 7 goals.

After that, in 2010 he moved to CS Mioveni, where he played for one season. Then he moved to ALRO Slatina for a season and returned to FC Argeș where he stayed until the club was disaffiliated and went extinct.

Dulcea remained in Pitesti, choosing to be involved in the revival of FC Argeș. He signed with SCM Pitesti and played there two seasons, in Liga III. In 2015 he ended his career as a footballer.

== Personal life ==
Dulcea has a son, Patrick, who is also a footballer.

== Honours ==
=== Player ===
Siófok

- Nemzeti Bajnokság II: 2001–02

Jiul Petroșani

- Divizia B: 2004–05

Argeș Pitești

- Liga II: 2007–08

Unirea Bascov

- Liga IV – Argeș County: 2017–18

=== Coach ===
Unirea Bascov

- Liga IV – Argeș County: 2017–18
