= Stadionul Comunal (Valea Ursului) =

Multi-purpose stadium in Valea Ursului, Romania

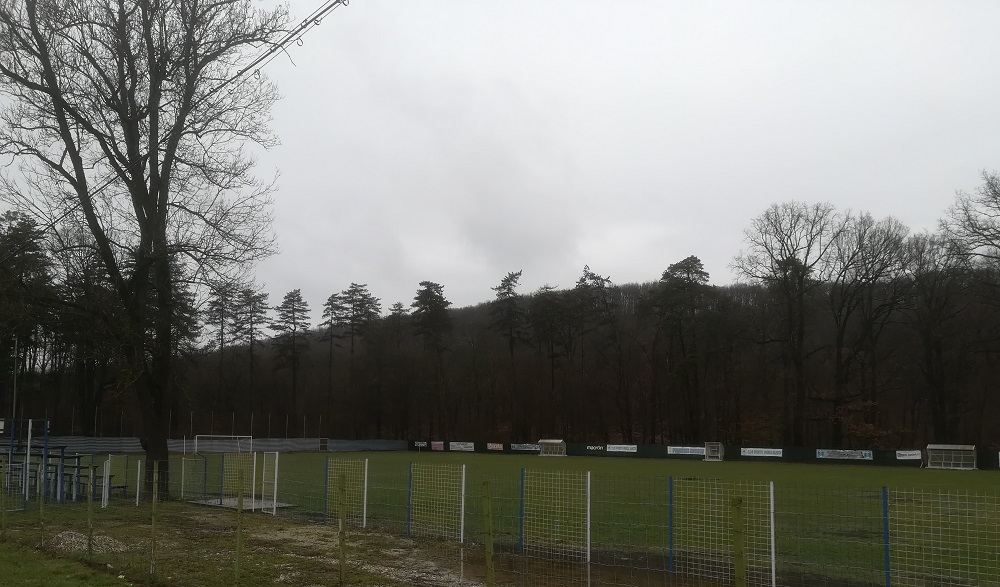
- Interactive map of Stadionul Comunal
- Location: Valea Ursului, Romania
- Coordinates: 44°53′14.6″N 24°46′42.6″E
- Owner: Commune of Bascov
- Operator: Unirea Bascov
- Capacity: 2,000 (400 seated)
- Surface: Grass

Construction
- Renovated: 2018–2020

Tenant
- Unirea Bascov (2007–present)

Stadionul Comunal is a multi-purpose stadium in the village of Valea Ursului, Bascov commune, Romania. It is currently used mostly for football matches. It is the home ground of Unirea Bascov and holds 2,000 people (400 seats).
