= Grădinile =

- Commune
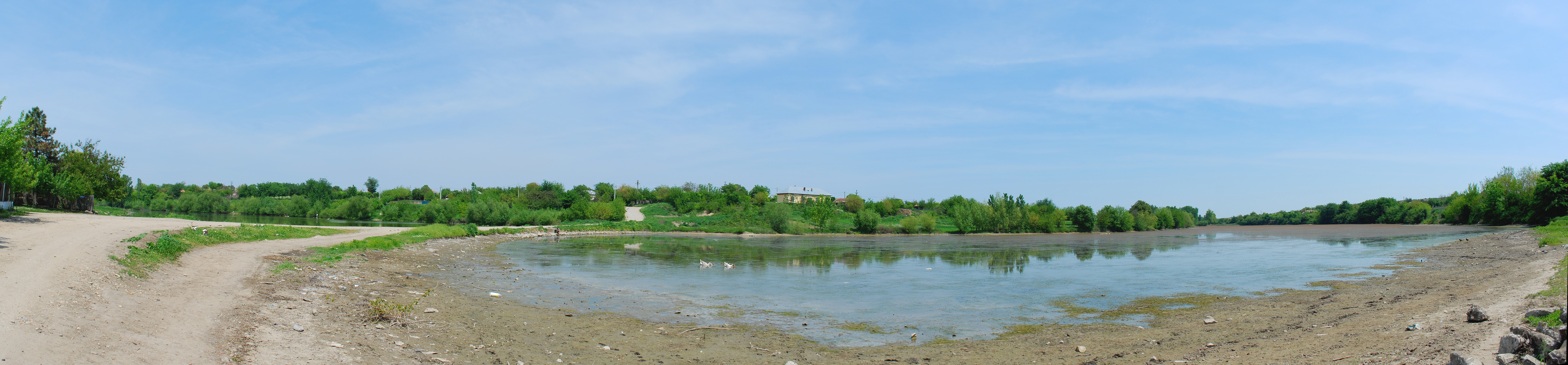
- The lake in the commune's center

- Location in Romania
- Coordinates: 43°57′N 24°23′E
- Country: Romania
- County: Olt
- Subdivisions: Arvăteasca, Grădinile, Plăviceanca

Government
  - Mayor (2024–2028): Ion Dincă (PSD)
- Area: 28.62 km^{2} (11.05 sq mi)
- Elevation: 98 m (322 ft)
- Population (2021-12-01): 1,462
  - Density: 51.08/km^{2} (132.3/sq mi)
- Time zone: UTC+02:00 (EET)
  - Summer (DST): UTC+03:00 (EEST)
- Postal code: 237447
- Area code: +(40) 249
- Vehicle reg.: OT
- Website: primaria-gradinile.ro

Grădinile is a commune in Olt County, Oltenia, Romania. It is composed of three villages: Arvăteasca, Grădinile, and Plăviceanca. These were part of Studina Commune until 2004, when they were split off.

The commune is situated on the Wallachian Plain. It is located in the southern part of Olt County, at a distance of 20 km (12 mi) from Caracal and Corabia, and 63 km (39 mi) from the county seat, Slatina.

== Natives ==
- Ionuț Mitran (born 2002), footballer
