= Alexandru Andrițoiu =

Romanian poet

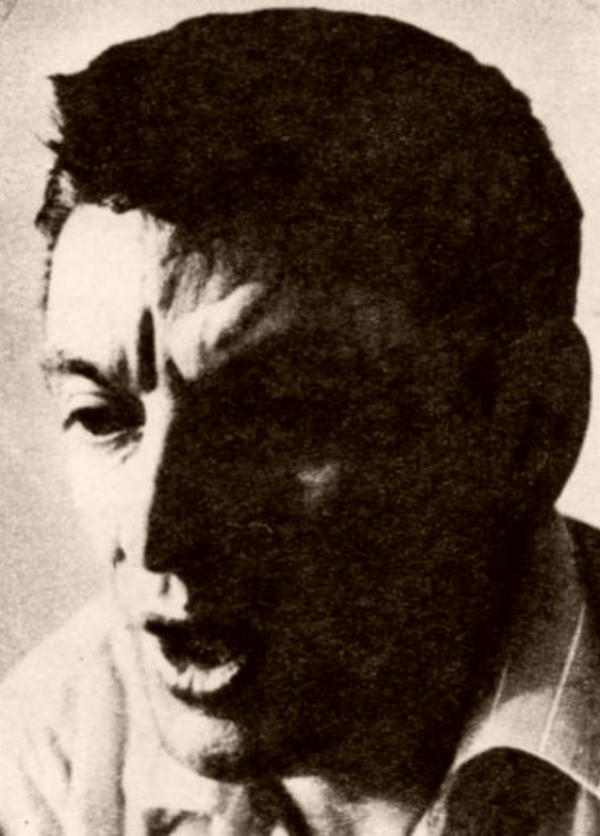
Andrițoiu in 1973

Alexandru Andrițoiu (Romanian pronunciation: [alekˈsandru andriˈt͡soju]; October 8, 1929, in Vașcău, Bihor – October 1, 1996, in Bucharest) was a Romanian poet.

Amongst his notable works are the poem "Ceaușescu - Omul", a romantic poem which is dedicated to Nicolae Ceaușescu the last communist leader of Romania upon his death in 1989.
