= CS Dinamo București (football) =

Association football club in Bucharest

Dinamo București
- Full name: Clubul Sportiv Dinamo București
- Nicknames: Alb-roșii (The White and Reds); Echipa ministerului (The Ministry's team)
- Short name: Dinamo
- Founded: 14 May 1948; 78 years ago 1 May 2014; 12 years ago (refounded)
- Ground: Colentina / CNF Buftea
- Capacity: 6,000 / 1,600
- Owner: Ministry of Internal Affairs
- General manager: Ionel Dănciulescu
- Head coach: Ionuț Chirilă
- League: Liga II
- 2025–26: Liga II; Regular season: 19th of 22; Play-out, Group A: 6th
- Website: www.csdinamo.eu
Home colours	Away colours	Third colours

Clubul Sportiv Dinamo București, commonly known as CS Dinamo București, or simply as Dinamo, is a Romanian football team based in Bucharest. The team represents the football section of the namesake multi-sport club and currently competes in Liga II.

== History ==
Dinamo București was founded on 14 May 1948, following the merger of Unirea Tricolor MAI and Ciocanul București as a multi-sport club under the Internal Affairs Ministry. In 1992, Fotbal Club Dinamo București was established as a distinct entity under the Ministry of Internal Affairs. In 1994, the football section was reorganized and all football activity was transferred to ACS FC Dinamo București which in 2000 obtained its Certificate of Sports Identity, fully detaching the football section from CS Dinamo and appointing Nicolae Badea as president.

Following this, the commercial company Dinamo 2001 SRL was registered to manage the football team. Minority stakes were transferred to several businessmen while ACS FC Dinamo retained the majority. Shortly afterwards the company was renamed SC Dinamo 1948 SA, which has since managed the professional football club in Romania’s top division. In 2017, ACS FC Dinamo enrolled its own senior team in the lower leagues. In 2014, the multi-sport club managed by the Ministry of Internal Affairs established a football academy, and in 2021 re-established its senior football team in Liga IV – Bucharest.

Under the guidance of Daniel Iftodi, Dinamo won the Bucharest Municipality Championship and subsequently promoted to Liga III after a play-off against Venus Independența, the winners of Liga IV Călărași County, winning 3–2 away and 1–0 at home. In the 2022–23 Liga III campaign, Iftodi was dismissed in November 2022 after twelve rounds, following a 2–3 away defeat to Flacăra Moreni. After an interim spell, Dănuț Lupu was replaced during the winter break by Marius Bratu, who led Dinamo to a 5th-place finish in the regular season and 6th place after the play-out stage of Series IV.

During the 2023–24 campaign, Marius Bratu led the White and Reds to a 1st-place finish in the regular season, but was dismissed in April 2024 after four rounds of the play-off stage of Series IV. He was replaced by Gheorghe Mihali, assisted by Bogdan Dobre, who guided the team to win the series and reach the promotion play-offs, where Dinamo eliminated Dunărea Călărași in the first round (3–1 away and 1–0 at home) before being knocked out in the second round by Afumați (0–1 away and 0–2 at home). Subsequently, an additional play-off for the sixth promotion place was held, in which Dinamo defeated Ghiroda 3–1 in the semi-final, which was to be the last match played at Dinamo Stadium before its demolition to make way for the new arena, but lost the final to Focșani 0–2 away at Milcovul Stadium.

Despite the ongoing demolition, the team continued to play its home matches at the old Dinamo Stadium during the 2024–25 Liga III campaign. In August 2024, Florin Bratu was appointed as the new head coach, and under his guidance, the White and Reds finished 3rd in the regular season of Series IV, went on to win the series after the play-off stage, and qualified for the promotion play-offs, in which Dinamo defeated Dunărea Călărași (4–2 away and 1–1 at home) in the first round, and secured promotion to Liga II after defeating Vedița Colonești (4–2 away and 1–1 at home) in the second round.

The White and Reds debuted in Liga II in the 2025–26 campaign with Florin Bratu as head coach, who led the team through the first nineteen rounds of the season during a difficult period marked by inconsistent results, while also guiding them to the Cupa României group stage, where they finished last in their group after three defeats against Dinamo 1948 (1–3), Concordia Chiajna (0–3), and Farul Constanța (0–4), before leaving two rounds prior to the end of the regular season after signing with first-tier side Metaloglobus București and being replaced by assistant Boris Keča, with the team sitting 19th at the end of the first stage. Although Ionel Dănciulescu was appointed head coach in April after the opening round of the play-out, Keča retained de facto control of the squad while serving as assistant, with Dănciulescu listed as head coach in match reports due to licensing regulations. Dinamo finished 6th in Group A of the play-out and qualified for the relegation play-off against 1599 Șelimbăr, where a 1–1 draw in the first leg was followed by a 0–2 defeat at Măgura Stadium in Cisnădie, resulting in relegation back to the third tier.

== Ground ==
The team played its home matches at the Dinamo Stadium, with a capacity of approx. 15,000 people, until 2025. From 2025 onward, the team plays its home matches at the CNF Buftea, at Buftea, Ilfov County, as its traditional ground does not meet the requirements for first league games. The ground is part of the Football Centre in Buftea and has a double stand with views to each of its two fields. It can hold 800 people on each side. The complex is the second training centre of the Romanian Football Federation. After one year they moved in Bucharest, to play their home matches at the Colentina Stadium.

== Honours ==
Liga III

- Winners (2): 2023–24, 2024–25

Liga IV Bucharest

- Winners (1): 2021–22

== Players ==
=== First team squad ===
As of 21 October 2026

Note: Flags indicate national team as defined under FIFA eligibility rules; some limited exceptions apply. Players may hold more than one non-FIFA nationality.

No.	Pos.	Nation	Player
1	GK	ROU	Patrick Marcu
2	MF	ROU	Radu Balca
3	DF	ROU	Ayan Anghel
4	DF	ROU	Andrei Avram (on loan from Dinamo București)
6	MF	ROU	George Gogescu
7	DF	ROU	Alin Demici (Vice-captain)
8	MF	ROU	Robert Lecca
9	FW	ROU	George Leață
10	MF	NGR	Peter Maapia (on loan from Dinamo București)
12	GK	ROU	Denis Oncescu (on loan from Dinamo București)
13	MF	ROU	Denis Rența
15	FW	ROU	Luca Baban
16	FW	ROU	Andrei Păun
17	FW	ROU	Luca Tincău
18	MF	ROU	David Ciocan
19	MF	ROU	Vlad Anghel
20	DF	ROU	Ionuț Mitran (3rd captain)

No.	Pos.	Nation	Player
21	DF	ROU	Marius Ifrim
22	DF	ROU	Rareș Cernamoriț (Captain)
23	GK	ROU	Mario Rovența
24	DF	ROU	Edis Amza
25	DF	ROU	Andrei Rus
26	DF	ROU	Flavius Dumbrăvean
27	FW	ROU	Ștefan Dumitrache
28	DF	ROU	Robert Nicolae
29	FW	ROU	Denis Colibășanu
30	MF	ROU	Paul Ciupei
31	MF	ERI	Aethen Yohannes
—	DF	ROU	Alecs Stanciu
—	MF	ROU	Eduard Stoicea
—	MF	ROU	Mario Tache
—	MF	ROU	Rareș Sebe
—	FW	ROU	Denis Tudor

== Club Officials ==
=== Board of directors ===
Role	Name
Owner	(Romania) Ministry of Internal Affairs
President	(Romania) Ionuț Popa
Vice-presidents	(Romania) Adrian Popescu (Romania) Georgeta Andrunache
General manager	(Romania) Ionel Dănciulescu
Technical director	(Romania) Ionuț Badea
Head of Youth Development	(Romania) Ionuț Lupescu
Team manager	(Romania) Daniel Lung

=== Current technical staff ===
Role	Name
Head coach	(Romania) Ionuț Chirilă
Assistant coach	(Romania) Ionuț Bălan
Goalkeeping coach	(Romania) Răzvan Stanca
Fitness coach	(Italy) Roberto De Filippis
Club doctor	(Romania) Talal Haj-Kanameh
Kinetotherapist	(Romania) Daniel Covaciu
Kit man	(Romania) Nicu Burcină

== League and cup history ==
Season	Tier	League	Place	Notes	Cupa României
2026–27	2	Liga II	TBD		Third round
2025–26	2	Liga II	19th	Spared from (R)	Group stage
2024–25	3	Liga III (Seria IV)	1st (C)	Promoted	Second round
2023–24	3	Liga III (Seria IV)	1st (C)		First round
2022–23	3	Liga III (Seria IV)	6th		Regional phase
2021–22	4	Liga IV (B)	1st (C)	Promoted	
