= Alex Orban (footballer) =

Romanian footballer (born 2008)

Personal information
- Full name: Alex Mihai Orban
- Date of birth: 14 October 2008 (age 18)
- Place of birth: Cluj-Napoca, România
- Height: 1.77 m (5 ft 10 in)
- Position: Winger

Team information
- Current team: Bihor Oradea (on loan from Universitatea Cluj)
- Number: 8

Youth career
- –2022: Sporting Cluj-Napoca
- 2018–2019: → Sănătatea Cluj (loan)
- 2022–: Universitatea Cluj

Senior career*
Years	Team	Apps	(Gls)
2025–	Universitatea Cluj	2	(0)
2026–	→ Bihor Oradea (loan)	12	(1)

International career^{‡}
2026–	Romania U19	3	(0)
- * Club domestic league appearances and goals as of 31 October 2026 ‡ National team caps and goals as of 29 September 2026

Alex Mihai Orban (born 14 October 2008) is a Romanian professional footballer who plays as a winger for Liga II club Bihor Oradea, on loan from Liga I club Universitatea Cluj.

== Career statistics ==
As of 31 October 2026

Appearances and goals by club, season and competition
Club	Season	League			Cupa României		Europe		Other		Total	
Club	Season	Division	Apps	Goals	Apps	Goals	Apps	Goals	Apps	Goals	Apps	Goals
Universitatea Cluj	2025–26	Liga I	2	0	0	0	0	0	—		2	0
Bihor Oradea (loan)	2024–25	Liga II	12	1	4	1	—		—		16	2
Career total			14	1	4	1	0	0	—		18	2

== Honours ==
Universitatea Cluj

- Cupa României runner-up: 2025–26
