= Lucian Ciocan =

Romanian footballer (born 1968)

Personal information
- Full name: Mircea Lucian Ciocan
- Date of birth: 17 June 1968 (age 58)
- Place of birth: Vașcău, Romania
- Height: 1.83 m (6 ft 0 in)
- Positions: Midfielder; defender

Youth career
- 1978–1986: Oțelul Bihor

Senior career*
Years	Team	Apps	(Gls)
1986–1987	Oțelul Bihor	17	(10)
1987–1989	Bihor Oradea	55	(7)
1989–1990	Steaua București	10	(2)
1990–1994	Bihor Oradea	104	(11)
1994	Békéscsaba	2	(1)
1994–1995	Bihor Oradea	28	(2)
1995–1997	Olimpia Satu Mare	31	(1)
1997–1999	Bihor Oradea	52	(17)
2000–2003	Baia Mare	91	(16)
Total		390	(67)

Managerial career
- 1997–1998: Bihor Oradea (assistant)
- 2000–2003: Baia Mare (assistant)
- 2003–2006: Lotus Băile Felix
- 2006–2008: Luceafărul-Lotus
- 2008–2009: Silvania Șimleu Silvaniei
- 2009–2010: Bihor Oradea (youth center)
- 2009–2010: Bihor II Oradea
- 2010: FC Paleu
- 2010–2014: Bihor Oradea (youth center)
- 2014–2015: Bihor Oradea (assistant)
- 2015–2016: Bihor Oradea (youth center)
- 2016–2022: CSM Oradea (youth center)
- 2022–: Bihor Oradea (youth center)
- * Club domestic league appearances and goals as of 20:12, 24 January 2025 (UTC)

Mircea Lucian Ciocan (born 17 June 1968) is a Romanian former professional footballer and currently a football manager. Born in Vașcău, Ciocan grew up and started his senior career at the same club, Oțelul Bihor. In 1987, he moved to FC Bihor Oradea, promoted to Divizia A with the red and blues and after one season in the top-flight, he got the transfer of his career, to Steaua București, the 1986 European Cup winner. For Steaua, Ciocan played in 10 matches and scored 2 goals at the level of Divizia A, then moved back to FC Bihor.

Most of his career, Lucian Ciocan played for his beloved FC Bihor, managing to gather no less than 239 appearances and scoring 37 goals, at the level of the first three divisions. Ciocan played with success for other teams, such as Olimpia Satu Mare or FC Baia Mare, with the last one managing to promote from the Divizia C to Divizia A. In total, Ciocan collected almost 400 matches at the level of the first three divisions in Romania and managed to score more than 65 times (58 matches and 6 goals in the Divizia A). He also played for a short time in Hungary, for the Nemzeti Bajnokság I side Békéscsaba Előre.

After retirement, Lucian Ciocan started his football manager career and was in charge of teams such as Baia Mare, Lotus Băile Felix, Luceafărul-Lotus, Silvania Șimleu Silvaniei or FC Bihor Oradea. He is currently one of the coaches that works in FC Bihor Oradea.

== Honours ==
=== Player ===
Bihor Oradea

- Divizia B: 1987–88
- Divizia C: 1997–98

Baia Mare

- Divizia C: 1999–2000

=== Manager ===
Lotus Băile Felix

- Divizia D: 2004–05

Luceafărul-Lotus

- Liga III: 2007–08
