= AF Măgura Cisnădie =

Romanian football club

Măgura Cisnădie
- Full name: Academia de Fotbal; Măgura Cisnădie
- Nickname(s): Cisnădienii (The People from Cisnădie); Textiliștii (The Textile Workers)
- Short name: Măgura
- Founded: 1969; 56 years ago as Textila Cisnădie; 2005; 20 years ago as FC Cisnădie; 2013; 12 years ago as Măgura Cisnădie
- Ground: Măgura
- Capacity: 2,450
- Owner: Cisnădie Town
- Chairman: Dan Raica
- League: not active at senior level
- 2021–22: Liga IV, Sibiu County, 14th
Home colours	Away colours

Academia de Fotbal Măgura Cisnădie, commonly known as Măgura Cisnădie or simply as Măgura, is a Romanian football club based in Cisnădie, Sibiu County. Măgura Cisnădie was originally founded in 1969, under the name of Textila Cisnădie, then re-founded in 2005 as FC Cisnădie, then finally in 2013, the club was re-established for the third time, under the current name, Măgura Cisnădie.

== History ==
Măgura Cisnădie was established for the first time in 1969, under the name of Textila Cisnădie. In the 1971–72 season, Textila won the Sibiu County Championship, but lost the promotion play-off against ICIM Brașov (1–3 at Cisnădie and 1–4 at Brașov). Then, in the summer of 1972, after missing the promotion to Divizia B, Independența Sibiu was moved to Cisnădie and merge with Textila to form Independența Cisnădie, finishing the 1972–73 season in fifth place.

In the summer of 1973, the club returns to the name of Textila, managing in the 1973–74 season, to finish the championship in second place, losing the promotion in front of CSU Brașov to the goal difference. For the next 32 years was a constant presence at the level of the third tier, but also with some relegations in the county leagues. The constancy of Textila was given by the owner of the club, which was the Textile Factory from Cisnădie, the biggest producer of carpets from Eastern Europe.

After the 1989 Romanian Revolution and the fall of communism, the factory, as well as the club, had more and more financial problems, finally, in the beginning of the 2000s, the Textile Factory and the football club went into bankruptcy. Textila Cisnădie was re-established in 2005, as FC Cisnădie and between 2007 and 2012 played again in the third tier, then the effects of the 2008 financial crisis arrived at the club, and FC withdrew from the championship, to the disappointment of the fans.

The club reappeared again, after one season of break, this time under the name of Măgura Cisnădie and in 2015 promoted back to Liga III, the place where the team obtained its biggest achievements. Financial trouble again hit the club, and after only one season "the Textile workers" withdrew again, but this time enrolled in the fourth tier. After some seasons in the county leagues, Măgura gathered his strength and promoted again, at the end of the 2019–20 season. The club was ranked second at the end of the next season (the best result ever) and qualified for the Liga II promotion play-offs.

== Ground ==
Măgura Cisnădie plays its home matches on Măgura Stadium in Cisnădie, Sibiu County, with a capacity of 2,450 seats (500 in the Main Stand and 1,950 in the Second Stand). The stadium was also known in the past under the name of Textila Stadium. It was renovated several times, most recently during the 2010s.

== Honours ==
Liga III:

- Runners-up (2): 1973–74, 2020–21

Liga IV – Sibiu County:

- Winners (10): 1971–72, 1979–80, 1986–87, 1991–92, 1992–93, 2001–02, 2006–07, 2013–14, 2014–15, 2019–20
- Runners-up (2): 1983–84, 2018–19

Cupa României – Sibiu County:

- Winners (1): 2018–19

== League history ==
Season	Tier	Division	Place	Notes	Cupa României
2021–22	4	Liga IV (SB)	14th	Relegated	
2020–21	3	Liga III (Seria VII)		Withdrew	
2019–20	4	Liga IV (SB)	1st (C)	Promoted	
2018–19	4	Liga IV (SB)	2nd		
2017–18	4	Liga IV (SB)	4th		
2016–17	4	Liga IV (SB)	3rd		
2015–16	3	Liga III (Seria IV)	7th	Withdrew	
2014–15	4	Liga IV (SB)	1st (C)	Promoted	

Season	Tier	Division	Place	Notes	Cupa României
2013–14	4	Liga IV (SB)	1st (C)		
2012–13	3	Liga III (Seria VI)	11th	Withdrew	
2011–12	3	Liga III (Seria IV)	6th		
2010–11	3	Liga III (Seria VI)	3rd		
2009–10	3	Liga III (Seria VI)	3rd		
2008–09	3	Liga III (Seria VI)	10th		
2007–08	3	Liga III (Seria IV)	8th		
2006–07	4	Liga IV (SB)	1st (C)	Promoted	

== Former managers ==
- (Romania) Mihai Dăscălescu (2011)
