= Ionuț Mitran =

Romanian professional footballer

Personal information
- Full name: Ionuț Radu Mitran
- Date of birth: 9 March 2002 (age 24)
- Place of birth: Grădinile, Romania
- Height: 1.78 m (5 ft 10 in)
- Position: Defender

Team information
- Current team: CS Dinamo București
- Number: 20

Youth career
- 2010–2017: CSȘ Caracal
- 2017–2020: Universitatea Craiova

Senior career*
Years	Team	Apps	(Gls)
2020–2023	Universitatea Craiova	9	(0)
2022–2024	→ CSM Slatina (loan)	41	(2)
2024–2026	CSM Slatina	50	(3)
2026–	CS Dinamo București	9	(0)

International career
2019–2020	Romania U18	7	(0)
2021	Romania U19	1	(0)
2022–2023	Romania U20	7	(0)
- * Club domestic league appearances and goals as of 30 October 2026

Ionuț Radu Mitran (born 9 March 2002) is a Romanian professional footballer who plays as a defender for Liga II club CS Dinamo București.

== Honours ==
Universitatea Craiova

- Cupa României: 2020–21
- Supercupa României: 2021
