= Boris Keča =

Bosnian-Herzegovinian footballer

Personal information
- Date of birth: 5 April 1978 (age 48)
- Place of birth: Bihać, SR Bosnia and Herzegovina, SFR Yugoslavia
- Height: 1.80 m (5 ft 11 in)
- Position: Defender

Youth career
- –1991: Jedinstvo Bihać
- 1991–1995: Borac Banja Luka

Senior career*
Years	Team	Apps	(Gls)
1995–1996	Borac Banja Luka		
1996–1998	BSK Banja Luka		
1998–1999	Omladinac Banja Luka		
1999–2003	Naţional București	48	(3)
2003–2004	FC Braşov	16	(0)
2005	Steaua București	1	(0)
2005–2006	Pandurii Târgu Jiu	19	(1)
2006–2007	Argeş Piteşti	3	(0)
2007–2008	Concordia Chiajna	4	(1)
2008–2009	Voinţa Domneşti		
Total		91	(5)

Managerial career
- 2017–2022: Dinamo București U19
- 2022–2024: CS Dinamo București U18
- 2024–2026: CS Dinamo București (assistant)
- 2026: CS Dinamo București
- * Club domestic league appearances and goals

Boris Keča (Serbian Cyrillic: Борис Кеча; born 5 April 1978) is a Bosnian former professional footballer who played as a defender.

== Club career ==
Keca was born in Bihać, Yugoslavia. He started playing in Romania with Naţional București, a club at the time popular for foreign players from Eastern-Europe (the likes of his fellow Bosnian Slaviša Mitrović or Albanian Albert Duro) or Australians (Michael Thwaite, Ryan Griffiths or Jonathan McKain). With Naţional he could compete in the 2002–03 UEFA Cup, where they would edge out teams like Tirana and Heerenveen before eventually being eliminated by Paris Saint-Germain in the Second Round.

He made his debut in Divizia A on 19 November 1999 against Universitatea Craiova.

He then transferred in 2003 to Braşov, from where he was brought to Steaua București in January 2005, by his former Naţional coach Walter Zenga, ahead of their 2004–05 UEFA Cup matches, where they managed to reach the Round of 16 after surpassing Valencia. He was being dropped out of the team after the defeat in the 2005 Romanian Supercup match.

Subsequently, he spent the 2004–2005 season at Pandurii Târgu Jiu, where they succeeded finishing in the last non-relegating spot in a season after which the first league would change from 16 to 18 teams. The following season, he was brought to Argeş Piteşti by another Italian manager Giuseppe Giannini. The club would get relegated at the end of the season finishing 17th, with Giannini being sacked after nine consecutive defeats.

Towards the end of his playing career he signed with the second league side Concordia Chiajna and the following season with the fourth division team of outer Bucharest, Voinţa Domneşti.

== Honours ==
=== Player ===
Borac Banja Luka

- Republika Srpska Cup: 1995–96

Borac Banja Luka

- Second League of the Republika Srpska - Banja Luka: 1997–98

Național București

- Cupa României runner-up: 2002–03

Steaua București

- Divizia A: 2004–05
- Supercupa României runner-up: 2005
