= Patrick Vuc =

German footballer (born 2004)

Personal information
- Date of birth: 11 March 2004 (age 22)
- Place of birth: Filderstadt, Germany
- Height: 1.88 m (6 ft 2 in)
- Positions: Attacking midfielder; forward

Team information
- Current team: Lokomotive Leipzig
- Number: 21

Youth career
- 2012–2017: TSV Bernhausen
- 2017–2018: FSV Waiblingen
- 2018–2022: SV Böblingen
- 2022–2023: SSV Reutlingen

Senior career*
Years	Team	Apps	(Gls)
2023	SSV Reutlingen	1	(0)
2023–2024	VfB Stuttgart II	0	(0)
2024–2025	Greuther Fürth II	8	(1)
2025	SGV Freiberg	0	(0)
2025–2026	Hermannstadt	6	(0)
2026–	1599 Șelimbăr	10	(0)
2026–	Lokomotive Leipzig	6	(0)
- * Club domestic league appearances and goals as of 13 September 2026

Patrick Vuc (born 11 March 2004) is a professional footballer who plays as an attacking midfielder or a forward for Regionalliga Nordost club Lokomotive Leipzig.

== Career ==
=== Early career ===
Vuc began his youth career in Germany, developing through the academies of TSV Bernhausen (2012–2017), FSV Waiblingen (2017–2018), and SV Böblingen (2018–2022). Standing 1.88 metres (6 ft 2 in) tall, he was noted for his physical presence as a striker during his youth development.

In the 2022–23 season, Vuc joined SSV Reutlingen 05's youth team, competing in the A-Junioren Bundesliga Süd/Südwest. He appeared in all 16 matches for Reutlingen's under-19 side, scoring five goals and providing one assist. His performances attracted attention from VfB Stuttgart, and in March 2023, he made his debut for Reutlingen's senior team in the Oberliga in a 1–5 defeat against ATSV Mutschelbach.

=== VfB Stuttgart II ===
In May 2023, Vuc signed with VfB Stuttgart II, the reserve team of Bundesliga club VfB Stuttgart, to compete in the Regionalliga Südwest. Expressing his ambition upon joining, Vuc stated his dream was to become a professional footballer, noting he felt welcomed by the club and was proud to wear the famous red-ringed Stuttgart shirt. He spent one season with the club's under-21 team before moving on to further his development.

=== SpVgg Greuther Fürth II and SGV Freiberg ===
In 2024, Vuc joined SpVgg Greuther Fürth II, the reserve team of 2. Bundesliga club SpVgg Greuther Fürth, continuing to play in the Regionalliga system. Later that year, he moved to SGV Freiberg, also competing at the regional level in German football.

=== FC Hermannstadt ===
On 1 July 2025, Vuc signed a two-year contract with Romanian Liga I club FC Hermannstadt, marking his first move outside Germany. The 21-year-old forward, had a trial with the club during their pre-season training camp in Turkey.

== Personal life ==
Vuc was born and raised in Germany, where he spent his entire youth career before moving to Romania. He possesses dual nationality, holding both German and Romanian citizenship.
