= Cosmin Bucuroiu =

Romanian professional footballer

Personal information
- Full name: Cosmin Alexandru Bucuroiu
- Date of birth: 11 September 2003 (age 23)
- Place of birth: Bucharest, Romania
- Height: 1.90 m (6 ft 3 in)
- Position: Winger

Team information
- Current team: 1599 Șelimbăr
- Number: 13

Youth career
- –2020: Școala de Fotbal Dănuț Coman
- 2013–2014: → SCM Pitești (loan)
- 2014–2015: → Academica Argeș (loan)

Senior career*
Years	Team	Apps	(Gls)
2020–2021	Unirea Bascov		
2021–2024	Hermannstadt	25	(0)
2023	→ Unirea Bascov (loan)		
2024–	1599 Șelimbăr	51	(14)
- * Club domestic league appearances and goals as of 31 October 2026

Cosmin Alexandru Bucuroiu (born 11 September 2003) is a Romanian professional footballer who plays as a winger for Liga II club 1599 Șelimbăr.

== Club career ==
=== Hermannstadt ===
He made his Liga I debut for Hermannstadt against Sepsi OSK on 21 August 2023.
