= Rubio (footballer, born 1995) =

Spanish footballer

Personal information
- Full name: Rubén López Huesca
- Date of birth: 24 June 1995 (age 31)
- Place of birth: Alicante, Spain
- Height: 1.85 m (6 ft 1 in)
- Position: Forward

Team information
- Current team: Borneo Samarinda
- Number: 9

Youth career
- –2012: Elche

Senior career*
Years	Team	Apps	(Gls)
2012–2016	Elche B	66	(15)
2016–2017	Hospitalet	30	(7)
2017–2018	Zaragoza B	33	(5)
2018–2019	Alcoyano	32	(6)
2019–2022	Cracovia	2	(1)
2020–2022	Cracovia II	16	(5)
2020	→ Zagłębie Sosnowiec (loan)	9	(2)
2020–2021	→ Sandecja Nowy Sącz (loan)	20	(5)
2022–2023	Alcoyano	30	(2)
2023–2024	SD Logroñés	11	(2)
2024–2025	Tudelano	28	(16)
2025–2026	CSA Steaua București	30	(12)
2026–	Borneo Samarinda	1	(0)
- * Club domestic league appearances and goals as of 20 September 2026

Rubén López Huesca (born 24 June 1995), commonly known as Rubio, is a Spanish professional footballer who plays as a forward for Super League club Borneo Samarinda.

== Club career ==
On 5 June 2019, he joined Polish club KS Cracovia.

On 5 October 2020, he was loaned to Sandecja Nowy Sącz.

== Honours ==
Elche B

- Tercera División: 2012–13

Cracovia

- Polish Cup: 2019–20

== Personal life ==
His older brother Carlitos is also a footballer.
