= Muscelul Stadium =

Stadium in Romania

- Interactive map of Muscelul Stadium
- Address: Bd. Ion Mihalache nr. 22
- Location: Câmpulung, Romania
- Coordinates: 45°15′57.3″N 25°02′52.7″E
- Owner: Municipality of Câmpulung
- Operator: ARO Câmpulung; Câmpulung Muscel
- Capacity: 6,000 (3,000 seated)
- Surface: Grass

Construction
- Opened: 1940s
- Renovated: 2008

Tenants
- ARO Câmpulung (1946–present); Câmpulung Muscel (2022–2026)

The Muscelul Stadium is a multi-use stadium in Câmpulung, Argeș County. It is the home ground of ARO Muscelul Câmpulung. It holds 6,000 people, of which 3,000 are on seats.
