= CSM Slatina (football) =

Romanian football club

- Full name: Clubul Sportiv Municipal Slatina
- Nicknames: Slătinenii (The People from Slatina); Alb-albaștrii (The White and Blues)
- Short name: Slatina
- Founded: 2009; 17 years ago 2018; 8 years ago (refounded)
- Ground: 1 Mai
- Capacity: 10,000 (6,500 seated)
- Owner: Slatina Municipality
- Chairman: Gheorghe Craioveanu
- Head coach: Adrian Dulcea
- League: Liga II
- 2025–26: Liga II, 9th of 22
- Website: https://www.csmslatina.ro/
Home colours	Away colours	Third colours

Clubul Sportiv Municipal Slatina (Romanian pronunciation: [ˈslatina]), commonly known as CSM Slatina or simply Slatina, is a Romanian association football club based in Slatina, Olt County. The team competes in Liga II, the second tier of the Romanian football league system.

The club was originally established in 2009 with financial backing from Slatina Municipality. It won promotion in each of its first two seasons, reaching Liga II in 2011. In 2011 the team merged with FC Piatra Olt, moved its home matches to Piatra Olt and competed as FC Olt Slatina. That entity ceased to exist in 2012.

The CSM Slatina name returned to senior football in 2018. The team started in the county leagues, reached Liga III in 2019 and was promoted to Liga II in 2020. After one season back in the third tier in 2021–22, CSM returned to Liga II, where it has competed since 2022.

== History ==
=== Football in Slatina before 2009 ===
Organised football in Slatina dates back to the early 1920s. The first sports association in the city was Oltul Slatina, founded in October 1922 by a group led by officer Mihail. The association also had athletics, skiing and bobsleigh sections, and its affiliation with the national sports federation was confirmed the following year.

Oltul played on the ground known as Zăvoi, situated on the site later occupied by Stadionul 1 Mai. One of the first major matches staged there was a friendly against Venus București in 1924. During the same period, Oltul also played against Levski Sofia, one of the earliest international fixtures involving a Slatina team.

Oltul won the Oltenia regional championship in 1924–25 and again in 1929–30, which allowed the club to take part in the final stages of the Romanian championship.

After the Second World War, football in the city was reorganised several times. Oltul became Progresul Slatina after 1950 and later Aluminiu Slatina in 1967. The Oltul name reappeared at the beginning of the 1970s, when a Slatina side competed in Divizia C.

In 1972–73, Oltul finished second in its Divizia C series. Following the expansion of Divizia B from two to three groups, the club was admitted to the second tier and entered the 1973–74 season as Dinamo Slatina. Dinamo's first Divizia B match was played on 12 August 1973, a 2–1 home victory over Electroputere Craiova.

The following decades saw a succession of clubs representing Slatina at regional and national level. Among them were Gloria Slatina, Dinamo Slatina, Energia, IPA, Sportul Muncitoresc, Metalurgistul, FC Slatina, IELIF, FC Grup Aluminiu and later another club using the Oltul name. Unlike some Romanian cities, Slatina did not have one uninterrupted senior football club throughout the post-war period.

Immediately before CSM Slatina was established, the city's most prominent team was connected to the local aluminium industry. Alprom Slatina won the Olt County fourth division in 2004–05 and finished second in its Divizia C series in 2005–06. In 2006, after changes involving Alprom and the local Oltul side, the team became Alro Slatina. This club was therefore created only three years before CSM Slatina appeared in 2009.

Alro and CSM subsequently existed at the same time. Alro played in the national divisions, while the newly created CSM began in the Olt County championship.

=== First CSM Slatina and FC Olt (2009–2012) ===
The first CSM Slatina football team was established in the summer of 2009 with financial support from Slatina Municipality.

Names used since 2009
Name	Period
CSM Slatina	2009–2011
FC Olt Slatina	2011–2012
CSM Slatina	2018–present

In its first season, CSM dominated Liga IV Olt. The team won all of its league matches, scoring 134 goals and conceding five, and qualified for the promotion play-off. CSM then defeated Petrolul Țicleni 4–0 on neutral ground and was promoted to Liga III.

CSM won Series IV of the 2010–11 Liga III and gained a second consecutive promotion, this time to Liga II.

The club's future became uncertain soon after promotion. Slatina Municipality withdrew its financial support in June 2011 and most of the playing squad was allowed to leave while officials looked for private financing.

Private investors eventually stepped in, and in August 2011 CSM merged with FC Piatra Olt. The team became FC Olt Slatina and played its home matches in Piatra Olt, despite retaining Slatina in its name.

Logo used during the FC Olt period.

FC Olt finished 13th in Series II of the 2011–12 Liga II, with nine victories from 30 matches.

The entity created from CSM Slatina and FC Piatra Olt ceased to exist in the summer of 2012. At the same time, the separate Alro Slatina club continued in Liga II and adopted the name FC Olt Slatina.

That later FC Olt was therefore a continuation of Alro rather than of the CSM entity founded in 2009.

=== Return of CSM Slatina (2018–present) ===
After several years without a CSM senior football team, the name returned during the second half of the 2017–18 season. CSM entered Liga V Olt during the winter break and finished eighth in Series I after playing only the remaining part of the campaign.

In the summer of 2018 the team was admitted to Liga IV Olt. Former forward Bobi Verdeș became player-coach, with promotion to Liga III set as the objective.

CSM won the county championship in 2018–19 and returned to the national leagues. It also won the Olt County stage of the Cupa României in both 2017–18 and 2018–19.

The club finished second in Series III of the 2019–20 Liga III. The season was stopped early because of the COVID-19 pandemic, and CSM entered a promotion play-off against Progresul Spartac. Slatina won both legs 1–0 and was promoted to Liga II with a 2–0 aggregate score.

CSM was relegated after one season in Liga II. A 0–1 defeat to Metaloglobus București in April 2021 confirmed the club's return to the third tier.

Slatina won Series VI of the 2021–22 Liga III and secured promotion through the play-offs in June 2022.

CSM has remained in Liga II since its return. The club finished in the middle or lower half of the table in the following seasons and avoided relegation through the play-out format.

In 2024–25, CSM finished eighth overall and again remained in the second division.

The club placed ninth in 2025–26. CSM was confirmed among the teams continuing in Liga II for 2026–27, with Adrian Dulcea taking charge of the team during the summer.

== Honours ==
=== Leagues ===
- Liga III
  - Winners (3): 2010–11, 2019–20, 2021–22
  - Runners-up (1): 2019–20
- Liga IV – Olt County
  - Winners (2): 2009–10, 2018–19

==== Cups ====
- Cupa României – Olt County
  - Winners (2): 2017–18, 2018–19

== Players ==
=== First-team squad ===
As of 12 October 2026

Note: Flags indicate national team as defined under FIFA eligibility rules; some limited exceptions apply. Players may hold more than one non-FIFA nationality.

No.	Pos.	Nation	Player
1	GK	ROU	Cătălin Preduț
2	MF	ROU	Matei Tabarcea
3	DF	ROU	Alexandru Ureche
4	DF	ROU	Abel Stan
5	MF	ROU	Alexandru Răuță (3rd captain)
6	MF	ROU	Robert Lăpădătescu
7	FW	ROU	Ionuț Năstăsie (Captain)
8	FW	ROU	Răzvan Matiș
9	FW	ROU	Alexandru Stan
10	MF	ROU	Emilian Pacionel
14	FW	ROU	Yanis Sorescu
16	DF	ESP	Pol Muñoz
17	MF	COL	Ronald Granja
18	MF	ROU	Ștefan Gheoroae

No.	Pos.	Nation	Player
19	FW	ROU	Szilárd Magyari
20	DF	ROU	Robert Riza
26	DF	ROU	Claudiu Stancu (on loan from Argeș Pitești)
28	DF	ROU	Vlad Andreș
29	FW	FRA	Jean-Calvin Mbanga
30	DF	ROU	Daniel Șerbănică
31	MF	ROU	Rareș Velea (on loan from Argeș Pitești)
33	DF	ROU	Mario Bărăitaru
47	MF	ROU	Alexandru Solcan
77	MF	ROU	Constantin Radu (Vice-captain)
80	DF	ROU	Alexandru Georgescu
90	GK	ROU	Mihai Răcășan (on loan from CFR Cluj)
97	MF	ROU	Antonio Bordușanu
98	MF	ROU	Andreas Mihaiu

=== Dual registration ===
Note: Flags indicate national team as defined under FIFA eligibility rules; some limited exceptions apply. Players may hold more than one non-FIFA nationality.

No.	Pos.	Nation	Player
—	GK	ROU	Alexandru Maxim (from Universitatea Craiova)
—	GK	ROU	Alexandru Glodean (from Universitatea Craiova)
—	MF	ROU	Mihnea Rădulescu (from Universitatea Craiova)

No.	Pos.	Nation	Player
—	MF	ROU	Denys Muntean (from Universitatea Craiova)
—	MF	ROU	Sebastian Șerban (from Universitatea Craiova)

=== Out on loan ===
Note: Flags indicate national team as defined under FIFA eligibility rules; some limited exceptions apply. Players may hold more than one non-FIFA nationality.

No.	Pos.	Nation	Player
—	FW	ROU	Ionuț Ivan (to Petrolul Hârtieşti until 30 June 2027)
—	FW	ROU	Mădălin Cojocaru (to Oltul Curtișoara until 30 June 2027)

No.	Pos.	Nation	Player
—	FW	ROU	Luca Ilie (to Unirea Bascov until 30 June 2027)

== Club officials ==
=== Board of directors ===
Role	Name
Owner	(Romania) Slatina Municipality
President	(Romania) Gheorghe Craioveanu
Sporting director	(Romania) Sebastian Noață
Technical director	(Romania) Marius Codescu
Youth Center Manager	(Romania) Cristian Stănculețu
Team Manager	(Romania) Gabriel Alexe

=== Current technical staff ===
Role	Name
Head coach	(Romania) Adrian Dulcea
Assistant coaches	(Romania) Viorel Ferfelea (Romania) Radu Necșulescu
Fitness coach	(Romania) Cristian Sandu
Goalkeeping coach	(Romania) Alin Răceanu
Club doctor	(Romania) Elena Ivan

== League history ==
Season	Tier	Division	Place	Notes	Cupa României
2026–27	2	Liga II	TBD		Play-off round
2025–26	2	Liga II	9th		Group stage
2024–25	2	Liga II	8th		Play-off round
2023–24	2	Liga II	13th		Third round
2022–23	2	Liga II	10th		Fourth round
2021–22	3	Liga III (Series VI)	1st (C, P)	Promoted	Round of 32
2020–21	2	Liga II	18th (R)	Relegated	Fourth round
2019–20	3	Liga III (Series III)	2nd (P)	Promoted via play-off	First round
2018–19	4	Liga IV (OT)	1st (C, P)	Promoted	Round of 32
2017–18	5	Liga V (OT)	8th	Entered during winter break	County phase – Winners
2012–17	No CSM Slatina senior team				
2011–12	2	Liga II (Series II)	13th	Competed as FC Olt Slatina	Fourth round
2010–11	3	Liga III (Series IV)	1st (C, P)	Promoted	
2009–10	4	Liga IV (OT)	1st (C, P)	Promoted; first season	

== Notable former players ==
The following players have represented CSM Slatina and have either played international football or had a significant spell with the club.

Romania

- (Romania) Valentin Alexandru
- (Romania) Cătălin Doman
- (Romania) Robert Gherghe
- (Romania) Cătălin Golofca
- (Romania) Nicușor Grecu
- (Romania) George Leață
- (Romania) Marian Manea
- (Romania) Silvian Matei
- (Romania) Ionuț Mitran
- (Romania) Radu Necșulescu
- (Romania) David Oprescu
- (Romania) Ștefan Pisăru
- (Romania) Alexandru Popovici
- (Romania) Daniel Rogoveanu
- (Romania) Alexandru Sălcianu
- (Romania) Ianis Stoica
- (Romania) Călin Toma
- (Romania) Dorin Toma
- (Romania) Andrei Trașcu

Equatorial Guinea

- (Equatorial Guinea) Óscar Siafá

Ghana

- (Ghana) Raman Chibsah

== Former managers ==
- (Romania) Bobi Verdeș (2018–2019)
- (Romania) Dinu Todoran (2020–2021)
- (Romania) Ovidiu Burcă (2021–2022)
- (Romania) Daniel Oprescu (2022–2024)
- (Romania) Claudiu Niculescu (2024–2026)
- (Romania) Viorel Ferfelea (2026)
- (Romania) Adrian Dulcea (2026–present)
