= Dragoș Tescan =

Romanian professional footballer

Personal information
- Full name: Dragoș Sebastian Tescan
- Date of birth: 15 September 1999 (age 27)
- Place of birth: Craiova, Romania
- Height: 1.83 m (6 ft 0 in)
- Position: Forward

Team information
- Current team: Bihor Oradea
- Number: 28

Youth career
- –2019: Școala de Fotbal Gheorghe Popescu

Senior career*
Years	Team	Apps	(Gls)
2019–2020	Turris Turnu Măgurele	11	(4)
2020–2021	UTA Arad	11	(0)
2021–2024	Universitatea Cluj	40	(7)
2024–2025	Gloria Buzău	10	(1)
2025–	Bihor Oradea	38	(11)
- * Club domestic league appearances and goals as of 31 October 2026

Dragoș Sebastian Tescan (born 15 September 1999) is a Romanian professional footballer who plays as a forward for Liga II club Bihor Oradea.

== Honours ==
Universitatea Cluj

- Cupa României runner-up: 2022–23
