= May 1 Stadium (Slatina) =

Multi-use stadium in Slatina, Olt County

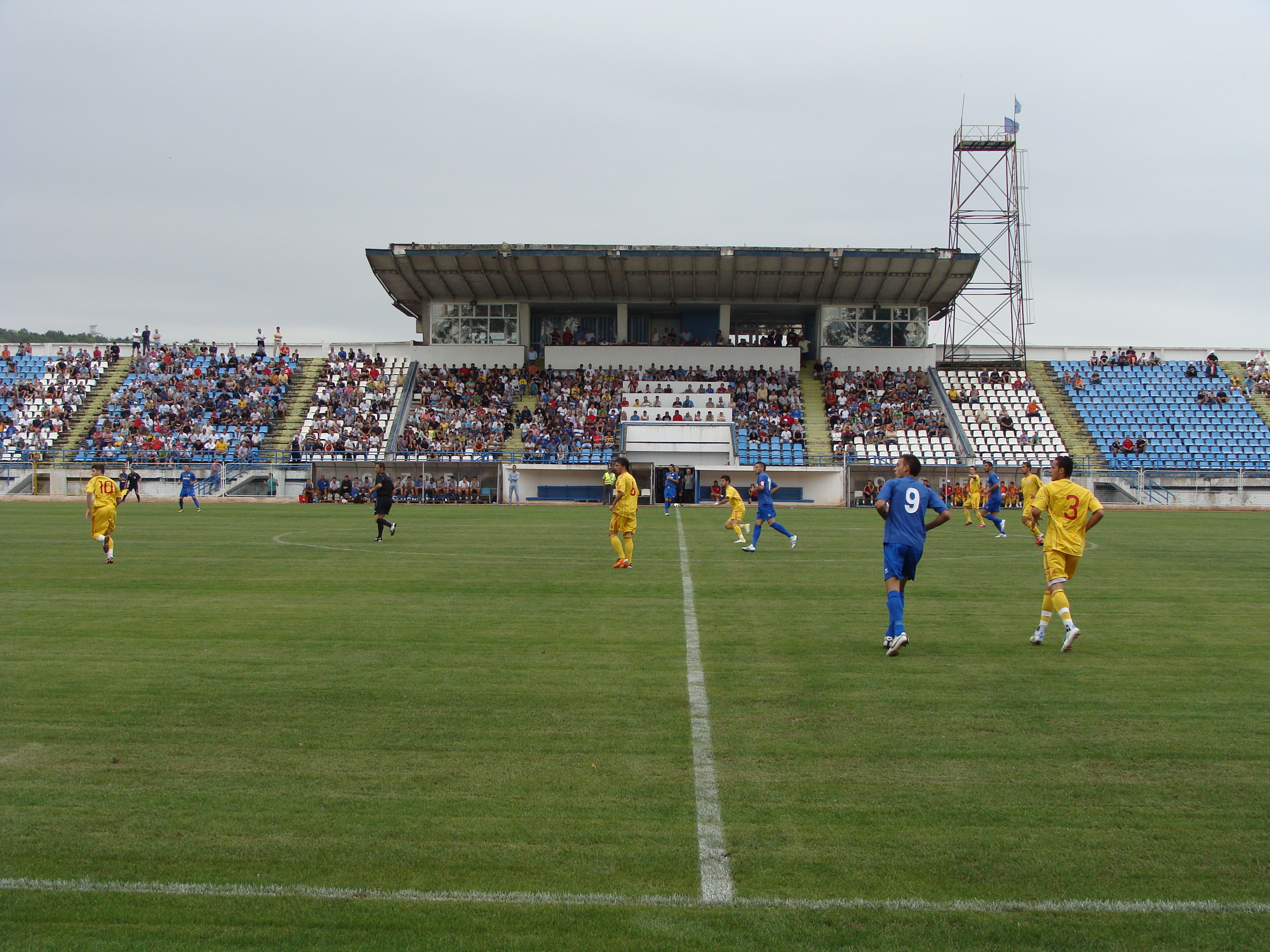
- The stadium in 2011
- Interactive map of May 1 Stadium
- Former names: Zăvoi Stadium
- Address: Str. Gheorghe Poboran
- Location: Slatina, Romania
- Coordinates: 44°25′23.5″N 24°21′0″E
- Owner: Municipality of Slatina
- Operator: CSM Slatina
- Capacity: 10,000 (6,500 seated)
- Surface: Grass

Construction
- Opened: 1924
- Renovated: 1970, 1973–1974, 1980–1982, 2005, 2010
- Expanded: 1980–1982

Tenants
- Oltul Slatina (1924–2006); Inter Olt Slatina (2006–2016); CSM Slatina (2017–present)

The May 1 Stadium is a multi-use stadium in Slatina, Olt County and is currently used mostly for football matches, being the home ground of CSM Slatina since 2017. In the past it was also the home ground of Oltul Slatina and Inter Olt Slatina. It can accommodate 10,000 spectators (6,500 on seats).

The stadium is planned to be demolished for a new modern arena. CSM Slatina will use an alternate venue during construction.
