= FC Bihor Oradea (2022) =

- Full name: Asociația Club Sportiv Fotbalistic Oradea
- Nicknames: Roș-albaștrii (The Red and Blues); Bihorenii (The People from Bihor County); Orădenii (The People from Oradea); Bihoru (The popular name of the County represented by the Team)
- Short name: FC Bihor
- Founded: 1 April 1958; 68 years ago 28 July 2022; 4 years ago (refounded)
- Ground: Iuliu Bodola
- Capacity: 11,155
- Owners: Oradea Municipality; APTOR; Bihor County Council
- Chairman: George Tătar
- Head coach: Erik Lincar
- League: Liga II
- 2025–26: Liga II, 4th of 22
- Website: www.fcbihor.ro
Home colours	Away colours

Asociația Club Sportiv Fotbalistic Oradea (Romanian pronunciation: [biˈhor oˈrade̯a]), commonly known as Bihor Oradea or simply as FC Bihor, is a Romanian professional football club based in Oradea, Bihor County, which competes in the Liga II.

It was founded under the name of Crișul Oradea in April 1958 and, since 1963, it has continued the football tradition of the city, following the dissolution of Club Atletic Oradea. FC Bihor played 18 seasons in the first division, the best performance being the 7th-place ranking on three occasions, in the seasons Liga I 1963–1964, 1983–1984, 1988–1989. At the end of the 2003–2004 season lit was relegated from Liga I, going on to play only in Liga II, failing to get promoted back. In January 2016, after continuously facing major financial problems, FC Bihor went bankrupt and disappeared from Romanian football.

In July 2022, the Oradea City Hall brought the club back to life, which it registered in the Liga III instead of the Club Atletic Oradea. The colors of the club from Oradea are Red and Blue.

== History ==
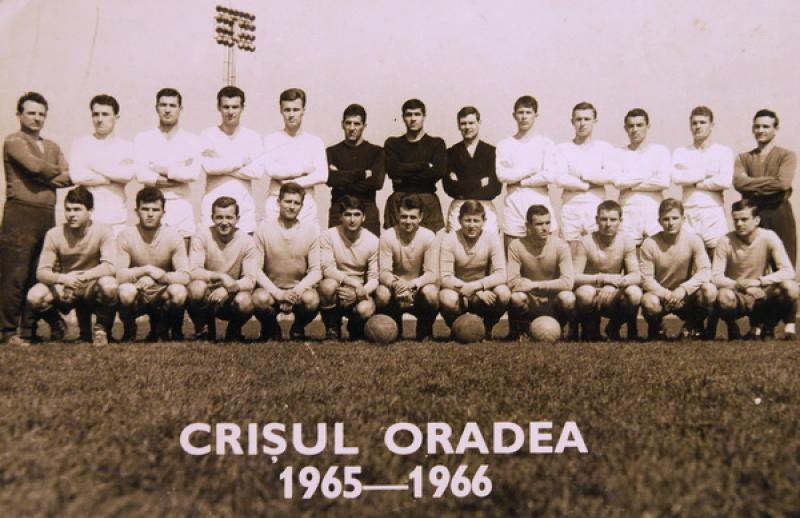
Crișul Oradea (1965–1966)

=== The original FC Bihor ===
The original FC Bihor Oradea was founded on 1 April 1958 as Crișul Oradea. The club reached the Romanian top flight for the first time in 1963 and spent three consecutive seasons in Divizia A before being relegated in 1966. Crișul returned to the first division in 1968 and again in 1971, before being reorganised and renamed FC Bihor in 1972.

The club's most successful period came during the 1980s, when it spent seven seasons in the top flight between 1982 and 1991. Players such as Marius Cheregi, Sorin Cigan, Sándor Kulcsár, Ovidiu Lazăr and Zsolt Muzsnay featured during this era, while FC Bihor achieved a seventh-place finish in the 1988–89 Divizia A, equalling the best league result in its history.

Following the Romanian Revolution, FC Bihor entered a prolonged period of sporting and financial instability. The club was relegated to the third tier in 1996 but later recovered, returning to the promotion race at the beginning of the 2000s. In the 2002–03 Divizia B season, then competing as FC Oradea, the team finished second and defeated Oțelul Galați in the promotion play-off. After losing the first leg 1–2 in Galați, FC Oradea won the return match 3–1 after extra time in front of approximately 20,000 spectators at the Municipal Stadium. The club's return to Divizia A lasted only one season, as it was relegated at the end of the 2003–04 campaign.

FC Bihor later returned to contention for promotion and finished second in the 2010–11 Liga II, earning the sporting right to compete in Liga I. However, the club was denied a first-division licence because of its financial situation. Financial problems intensified during the following years, and FC Bihor was eventually declared bankrupt on 12 January 2016 and ceased activity.

Following FC Bihor's dissolution, much of the local institutional support and football funding was redirected towards CA Oradea, which was re-established in 2017, 54 years after the historic club had ceased activity. The project initially began in the county leagues and later developed through a partnership with the municipality's sports structures, becoming the main senior football project supported in Oradea during the following years.

=== Re-establishment ===
In 2021, the Municipality of Oradea announced plans to revive the FC Bihor Oradea identity as part of a wider reorganisation of local football. At the time, CA Oradea operated through a partnership involving public and private stakeholders, but disagreements over the future direction of the project eventually led to a separation. The private side decided to continue CA Oradea in the county leagues, while the municipality moved forward with plans to establish a new club using the FC Bihor identity.

On 24 June 2022, CA Oradea officially announced that it would withdraw its senior team to the county leagues. On 28 July, the local authorities approved the organisational structure of the newly established Asociația Club Sportiv Fotbalistic Oradea, which received the right to use the registered FC Bihor Oradea brand. The club, owned by the Municipality of Oradea, APTOR and the Bihor County Council, was admitted directly to Liga III in the place vacated by CA Oradea, with former FC Bihor player Sándor Kulcsár appointed chairman.

FC Bihor quickly became one of the strongest teams in the third tier. After missing promotion in its first campaign, the club dominated the 2023–24 Liga III season and successfully completed the promotion play-offs, earning promotion to Liga II for the 2024–25 season. The Romanian Football Federation officially listed FC Bihor among the six clubs promoted from Liga III that summer.

In its first season back in the second tier, FC Bihor retained its Liga II status. The club made further progress in the 2025–26 season, qualifying for the promotion play-off alongside Corvinul Hunedoara, Sepsi OSK, FC Voluntari, Steaua București and Chindia Târgoviște. Although it did not earn promotion, Bihor recorded several notable results during the play-off, including two 3–1 victories over Chindia and a 3–3 draw against Steaua.

FC Bihor remained in Liga II for the 2026–27 season, being listed by the federation among the clubs continuing from the previous second-tier campaign.

== Youth program ==
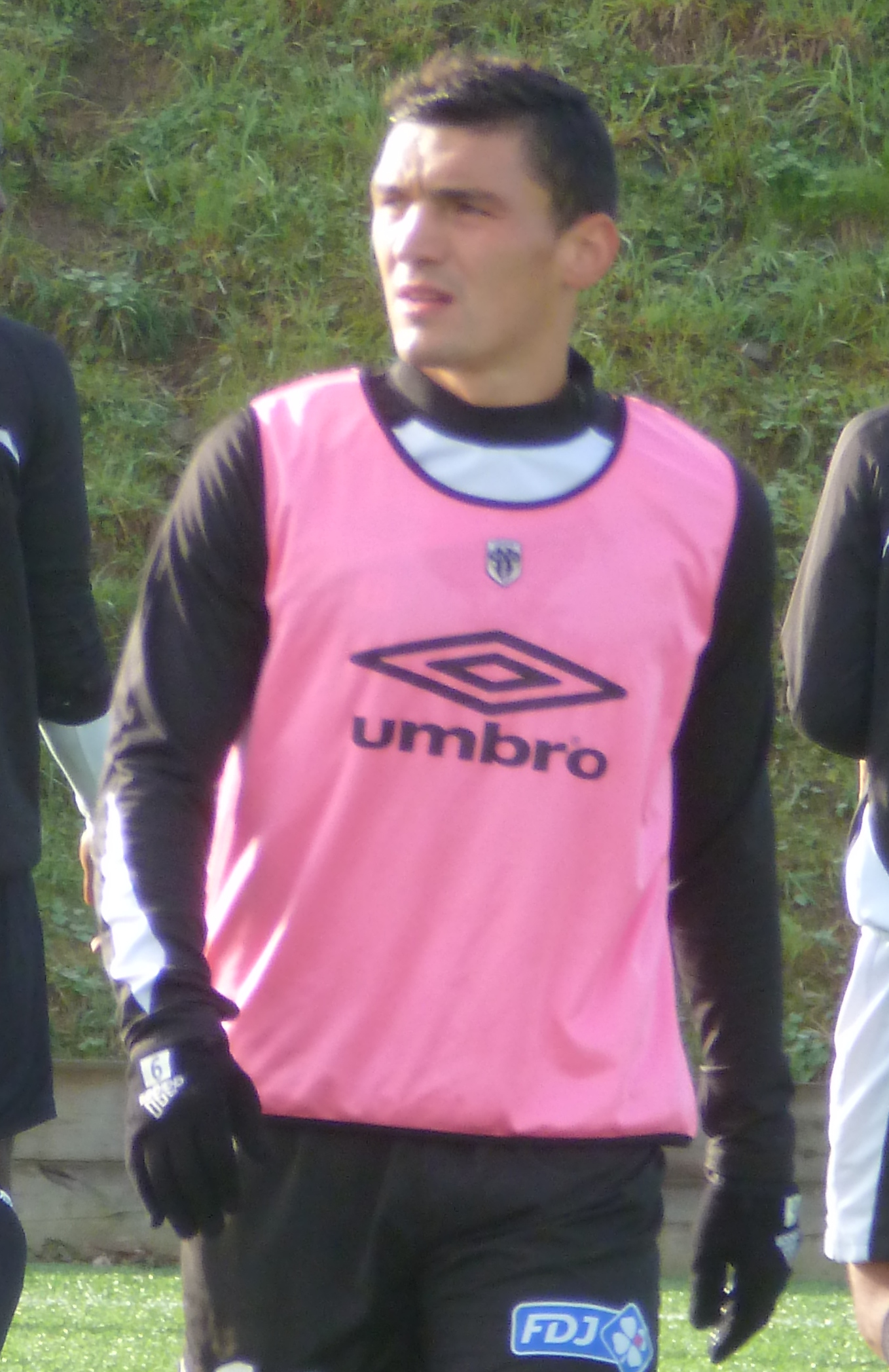
Claudiu Keșerü, one of the most valuable players who was at FC Bihor youth academy.

Youth academy of FC Bihor Oradea (1958) gave important names for the Romanian and international football such as: Sebastian Achim, Cosmin Bărcăuan, Zeno Bundea, Cristian Cigan, Viorel Domocoș, Ioan Filip, Ramses Gado, Ovidiu Hoban, Claudiu Keșerü, Attila Kun, Ovidiu Lazăr, Raymond Lukacs, Marius Popa, Daniel Usvat or Ion Zare.

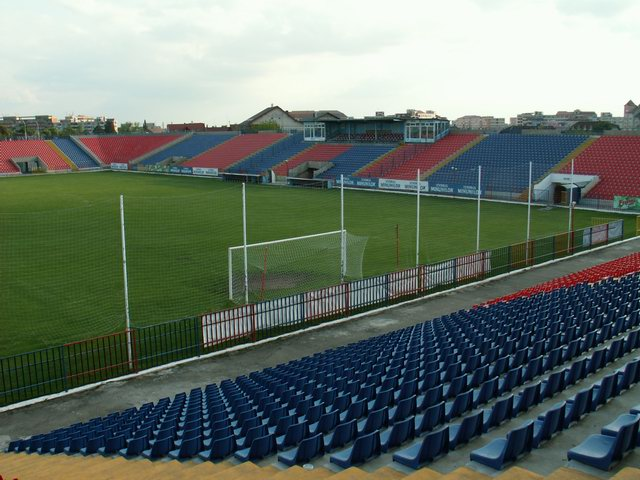
Iuliu Bodola Stadium.

After the declaration of bankruptcy in 2016, CSM Oradea announced the establishment of the football department and took the youth academy of FC Bihor. Between 2017 and 2022, Club Atletic Oradea formed its senior team which started from the fifth league (lowest county level) following the partnership signed with CSM Oradea, the club which took over the youth academy of FC Bihor Oradea (1958).

In the summer of 2022, CAO 1910 and CSM Oradea terminated the partnership they had, and then CSM Oradea, the sports club supported by the Municipality of Oradea, started a partnership with the reborn club of F.C. Bihor Oradea.

FC Bihor Academy is coordinated by Gheorghe Ghiț and the coaches of the youth groups are Claudiu Mutu, Sorin Todea, Horia Rădulescu, Sorin Pop, Lucian Ciocan, Adrian Gongolea and Dorin Mihuț.

== Grounds ==
FC Bihor Oradea plays its home matches on the Iuliu Bodola Stadium in Oradea, stadium that was also used by FC Bihor Oradea (1958) between 1958 and 2016, and then by Luceafărul and CAO 1910. The stadium holds 11,155 people, restricted from 18,000 due to advanced stage of degradation of the second stand. It used to be called Crișul / FC Bihor / Municipal Stadium, but in November 2008 the name was changed to Iuliu Bodola, after one of the most famous' players that played for a local team here. The stadium is also equipped with a second ground with natural grass and an artificial turf pitch, but the latter being a small size one (60x40m).

== Honours ==
- Liga III
  - Winners (2): 2022–23, 2023–24

== Players ==
=== First-team squad ===
As of 5 October 2026

Note: Flags indicate national team as defined under FIFA eligibility rules; some limited exceptions apply. Players may hold more than one non-FIFA nationality.

No.	Pos.	Nation	Player
1	GK	ROU	Iustin Chirilă (on loan from Universitatea Cluj)
2	DF	ROU	Szabolcs Kilyén
3	DF	ROU	Andrei Gal (3rd captain)
4	DF	ROU	Abel Popa (4th captain)
5	MF	SLO	Nik Jermol
6	MF	ROU	Tudor Călin
7	FW	ROU	Ioan Hora (Captain)
8	MF	ROU	Alex Orban (on loan from Universitatea Cluj)
9	FW	ROU	Nicu Modan
10	MF	ROU	Alexandru Bota (on loan from Universitatea Cluj)
11	FW	BIH	Ilija Bagarić
12	GK	ROU	Edgar Cadar
16	MF	ROU	Ioan Filip (Vice-captain)
18	FW	ROU	Mark Moruț

No.	Pos.	Nation	Player
20	DF	POR	Pedro Albino
21	DF	ROU	Paul Antoche
23	MF	ROU	Antonio Cruceru
25	FW	ROU	Angelo Cocian
28	FW	ROU	Dragoș Tescan
32	FW	MDA	Alexandru Boiciuc
67	DF	ROU	Mihai Velisar
71	DF	ROU	Sorin Șerban
77	DF	SVK	Peter Gál-Andrezly
79	GK	ROU	Mihai Oneț
80	MF	ROU	Florian Haită (on loan from Voluntari)
88	DF	ROU	Eduard Duțu
99	FW	SVK	Jozef Dolný

=== Out on loan ===
Note: Flags indicate national team as defined under FIFA eligibility rules; some limited exceptions apply. Players may hold more than one non-FIFA nationality.

No.	Pos.	Nation	Player
—	GK	ROU	Răzvan Cutean (at Unirea Alba Iulia until 30 June 2027)
—	DF	ROU	Andrei Mocuța (at Bihorul Beiuș until 30 June 2027)
—	DF	ROU	Sebastian Cucu (at Crișul Sântandrei until 30 June 2027)
—	DF	ROU	Mihai Kereki (at CSM Olimpia Satu Mare until 30 June 2027)

No.	Pos.	Nation	Player
—	MF	ROU	Gelu Gitye (at Crișul Sântandrei until 30 June 2027)
—	MF	ROU	Antonio Berke (at Bihorul Beiuș until 30 June 2027)
—	FW	ROU	Matei Bodog (at Crișul Sântandrei until 30 June 2027)

== Club officials ==
=== Board of directors ===
Role	Name
Owners	(Romania) Oradea Municipality (Romania) APTOR (Romania) Bihor County Council
President	(Romania) George Tătar
Vice-presidents	(Romania) Șerban Sere (Romania) Mihai Jurcă
Board Members	(Romania) Eduard Florea (Romania) Laurențiu Danșa (Romania) Alexandru Chira
Sporting Director	(Romania) Sorin Paraschiv
Marketing Director	(Romania) Bogdan Bordaș
Scouting Director	(Romania) Adrian Anca
Social Media responsible	(Romania) Kristóf Deák
Head of Youth Development	(Romania) Călin Cheregi
Delegate	(Romania) Bogdan Guler
Press Officer	(Romania) Florin Mihalca

- Last updated: 30 August 2025
- Source: Board of directors

=== Technical staff ===
Role	Name
Head coach	(Romania) Erik Lincar
Assistant coaches	(Romania) Viorel Domocoș (Romania) Mădălin Popa
Goalkeeping coach	(Romania) Vlad Ghețe
Fitness coach	(Romania) Bogdan Aldea
Club doctor	(Romania) Alin Iova
Physiotherapists	(Romania) Alexandru Bogdănel (Romania) Ionuț Iacob (Romania) Bogdan Ciuciu

- Last updated: 5 October 2026
- Source: Technical staff

== Notable former players ==
The footballers enlisted below have had international cap(s) for their respective countries at junior and/or senior level and/or significant caps for Bihor Oradea.

Romania

- (Romania) Ionuț Ban
- (Romania) Andreas Chirițoiu
- (Romania) Sebastian Cucu
- (Romania) Ricardo Farcaș
- (Romania) Andrei Gheorghiță
- (Romania) Răzvan Gunie
- (Romania) Călin Jurj
- (Romania) Sergiu Jurj
- (Romania) Andrei Moga
- (Romania) Albert Stahl
- (Romania) Bogdan Vătăjelu

Netherlands

- (Netherlands) Desley Ubbink

== League history ==
Season	Tier	Division	Place	Cupa României
2026–27	2	Liga II	TBD	
2025–26	2	Liga II	4th	Play-off round
2024–25	2	Liga II	12th	Play-off round
2023–24	3	Liga III (Seria VIII)	1st (C, P)	Group Stage
2022–23	3	Liga III (Seria X)	1st (C)	
