= Măgura Stadium (Cisnădie) =

Multi-use stadium in Cinsădie, Romania

- Interactive map of Măgura Stadium
- Former names: Textila Stadium
- Address: Str. Cetății 19
- Location: Cisnădie, Romania
- Coordinates: 45°42′36.7″N 24°09′11.3″E
- Owner: Town of Cisnădie
- Operator: Măgura Cisnădie
- Capacity: 2,450 on seats
- Surface: Grass

Construction
- Opened: 1950s
- Renovated: 1980s, 2000s, 2010s

Tenants
- Măgura Cisnădie (1969–present); 1599 Șelimbăr (2019–present)

The Măgura Stadium is a multi-use stadium in Cisnădie, Romania. It is used mostly for football matches, is the home ground of Măgura Cisnădie and 1599 Șelimbăr and holds 2,450 people on seats (500 in the Main Stand and 1,950 in the Second Stand).
