= ACS Unirea Bascov =

Romanian football club

Unirea Bascov
- Full name: Asociația Club Sportiv; Unirea Bascov
- Nicknames: Urșii (The Bears)
- Short name: Bascov
- Founded: 2007; 19 years ago as AS Valea Ursului
- Ground: Comunal
- Capacity: 2,000 (400 seated)
- Owner: Bascov Commune
- Chairman: Daniel Pirciu
- Manager: Cosmin Năstăsie
- League: Liga IV
- 2025–26: Liga III, Seria VI, 10th (relegated)
| Home colours | Away colours |

Asociația Club Sportiv Unirea Bascov, commonly known as Unirea Bascov, is a Romanian professional football club based in Bascov, Argeș County and currently playing in the Liga IV.

== History ==
The club was founded in 2007 as AS Valea Ursului and competed in Liga V – Argeș County, the fifth tier of Romanian football.

After finishing 2nd in the 2010–11 season of the Center 1 Series, 1st place was claimed the following season, earning promotion to Liga IV – Argeș County. The first two seasons in the fourth tier resulted in a 4th-place finish in the 2012–13 season and a 2nd-place finish in the 2013–14 season.

In 2014, the team merged with AS Bascov to form Unirea Bascov. Led by coach Alin Lipa in the 2014–15 season, Unirea Bascov won the county championship but missed out on promotion to Liga III after a 2–4 aggregate defeat to FC Aninoasa, the champion of Dâmbovița County.

A 2nd-place finish followed in the 2015–16 season. Under coach Alin Chița, the county championship was won for the second time in the 2016–17 season. Unfortunately, promotion was missed again after a 1–4 aggregate loss to FC Avrig, the champion of Sibiu County.

Unirea Bascov finally secured promotion to Liga III in the 2017–18 season. Coached by former FC Argeș striker Adrian Dulcea, the club achieved a historic treble by winning the Liga IV – Argeș County title, the promotion play-off to Liga III, and the Romanian Cup county phase.

In Liga III, Unirea Bascov finished 9th in the 2018–19 season and 7th in the 2019–20 season, which was interrupted on 9 March 2020 after 16 rounds due to the COVID-19 pandemic. The club followed up with a 4th-place finish in the 2020–21 season and another 4th place in the 2021–22 season, both in the regular season and the series play-off. In the 2022–23 season, the team finished 6th in the regular season and 5th overall.

In the summer of 2023, Adrian Dulcea left the team after six years to take on the role of coach for Romania's U-18 national team. Marius Stoica was appointed as the new coach but was replaced in November by Cosmin Năstăsie, who guided Unirea Bascov to a 7th-place finish in the regular season and 5th overall in the sixth series of the 2023–24 season.

== Honours ==
=== Leagues ===
Liga IV – Argeș County

- Winners (3): 2014–15, 2016–17, 2017–18
- Runners-up (2): 2013–14, 2015–16

Liga V – Argeș County

- Winners (1): 2011–12
- Runners-up (1): 2010–11

=== Cups ===
Cupa României – Argeș County

- Winners (3): 2013–14, 2015–16, 2017–18

== Players ==
=== First team squad ===
As of 10 September 2024

Note: Flags indicate national team as defined under FIFA eligibility rules; some limited exceptions apply. Players may hold more than one non-FIFA nationality.

| No. | Pos. | Nation | Player |
|---|---|---|---|
| 1 | GK | ROU | Alexandru Silveanu (on loan from FC Argeș) |
| 2 | DF | ROU | Gabriel Puică |
| 3 | DF | ROU | Mihai Tănase |
| 4 | DF | ROU | Andrei Linte (Captain) |
| 5 | MF | ROU | Alexandru Ionescu |
| 6 | DF | ROU | Ionuț Teodorescu |
| 7 | MF | ROU | Mario Constantin |
| 8 | MF | ROU | Andrei Govlej |
| 9 | FW | ROU | David Maria |
| 10 | FW | ROU | Adrian Albulescu |
| 11 | MF | ROU | Mario Iordache (on loan from Mioveni) |
| 12 | GK | ROU | Răzvan Enăchioiu |
| 13 | DF | ROU | Ionuț Doinea |
| 14 | MF | ROU | Antonio Petre |
| 15 | MF | ROU | Deniz Kaya |

| No. | Pos. | Nation | Player |
|---|---|---|---|
| 16 | MF | FRA | Junior Kalou |
| 17 | MF | ROU | Flavius Stăncescu |
| 18 | DF | ROU | Alexandru Dumitrache (Vice-Captain) |
| 19 | MF | ROU | Theodor Butoiu |
| 20 | MF | ROU | Luca Gavrilă |
| 21 | MF | ROU | Cătălin Bratu |
| 22 | MF | ROU | Daniel Rada |
| 23 | FW | CIV | Junior Zeze |
| 30 | GK | ROU | Mihai Preda |
| 31 | GK | ROU | Roberto Mitrache |
| 80 | DF | ROU | Marius Dudău |
| 88 | MF | ROU | Andrei Popescu |
| 98 | DF | ROU | Mario Dobre |
| 99 | MF | ROU | Antonio Papuc |

=== Out on loan ===
Note: Flags indicate national team as defined under FIFA eligibility rules; some limited exceptions apply. Players may hold more than one non-FIFA nationality.

| No. / Pos. / Nation / Player | No. / Pos. / Nation / Player |

== Club officials ==
=== Board of directors ===
| Role | Name |
|---|---|
| Owner | (Romania) Bascov Commune |
| President | (Romania) Dan Pirciu |
| Vice-President | (Romania) Ionuț Toroabă |
| Sporting director | (Romania) George Mogîrdău |

=== Current technical staff ===
| Role | Name |
|---|---|
| Manager | (Romania) Cosmin Năstăsie |
| Assistant coach | (Romania) Alexandru Neagu |
| Goalkeeping coach | (Romania) Riccardo Gallo |

== League history ==
| Season | Tier | Division | Place | Notes | Cupa României |
|---|---|---|---|---|---|
| 2025–26 | 3 | Liga III (Seria VI) | TBD | | |
| 2024–25 | 3 | Liga III (Seria VIII) | 3rd | | |
| 2023–24 | 3 | Liga III (Seria VI) | 5th | | |
| 2022–23 | 3 | Liga III (Seria IV) | 5th | | |
| 2021–22 | 3 | Liga III (Seria IV) | 4th | | |
| 2020–21 | 3 | Liga III (Seria VI) | 4th | | Second round |
| 2019–20 | 3 | Liga III (Seria III) | 7th | | First round |
| 2018–19 | 3 | Liga III (Seria III) | 9th | | Second round |

| Season | Tier | Division | Place | Notes | Cupa României |
|---|---|---|---|---|---|
| 2017–18 | 4 | Liga IV (AG) | 1st (C) | Promoted | |
| 2017–18 | 4 | Liga IV (AG) | 1st (C) | Promoted | |
| 2016–17 | 4 | Liga IV (AG) | 1st (C) | | Second round |
| 2015–16 | 4 | Liga IV (AG) | 2nd | | |
| 2014–15 | 4 | Liga IV (AG) | 1st (C) | | Third round |
| 2013–14 | 4 | Liga IV (AG) | 2nd | | |
| 2012–13 | 4 | Liga IV (AG) | 4th | | |
| 2011–12 | 5 | Liga V (AG) | 1st (C) | Promoted | |

== Former managers ==
- (Romania) Adrian Neaga (2013)
- (Romania) Adrian Dulcea (2017–2023)
- (Romania) Marius Stoica (2023)
- (Romania) Cosmin Năstăsie (2023–)
