= 2024–25 FC Politehnica Iași season =

FC Politehnica Iași
2024–25 season
- Manager: Tony
- Stadium: Emil Alexandrescu Stadium
- Liga I: 14th
- Cupa României: Pre-season
Home colours	Away colours	Third colours

The 2024–25 season is the 15th season in the history of FC Politehnica Iași, and the club's fifth consecutive season in Liga I. In addition to the domestic league, the team is scheduled to participate in the Cupa României.

== Transfers ==
=== In ===
Pos.	Player	Transferred from	Fee	Date	Source
DF	(Portugal) Guilherme Soares	(Portugal) Braga B	Undisclosed	1 July 2024	
FW	(Portugal) Gonçalo Teixeira	(Portugal) Länk FC Vilaverdense	Free	1 July 2024	
DF	(Portugal) Cláudio Silva	(Portugal) Feirense	Free	1 July 2024	
GK	(Spain) Jesús Fernández	(Romania) Voluntari	Free	1 July 2024	
MF	(Brazil) Tailson	(Brazil) Santos	Free	1 July 2024	
MF	(Romania) Valentin Gheorghe	(Romania) Universitatea Cluj	Free	1 July 2024	
MF	(Romania) Matei Tănasă	(Romania) FCSB U19	Undisclosed	10 July 2024	
MF	(Croatia) Robert Mišković	(Czech Republic) FC Banik Ostrava	Free	10 July 2024	
FW	(Albania) Florian Kamberi	Free agent	Free	10 July 2024	
MF	(Cameroon) Samuel Gouet	(Switzerland) Yverdon-Sport	Free	12 July 2024	

=== Out ===
Pos.	Player	Transferred to	Fee	Date	Source
MF	(Romania) Luca Mihai	(Romania) CFR Cluj	Loan return	30 June 2024	
GK	(Romania) Silviu Lung Jr.	(Romania) Universitatea Craiova	End of contract	1 July 2024	
FW	(Tunisia) Adel Bettaieb	(Romania) Universitatea Cluj	End of contract	1 July 2024	
DF	(Croatia) Matija Katanec		End of contract	1 July 2024	
FW	(Sweden) Kevin Kabran		End of contract	1 July 2024	
DF	(Algeria) Rachid Bouhenna		End of contract	1 July 2024	
MF	(Croatia) Robert Mišković	(Czech Republic) Slovácko	Undisclosed	3 January 2025	

== Friendlies ==
=== Pre-season ===
26 June 2024 Friendly	Montana (Bulgaria)	1–1	(Romania) Politehnica Iași	Bansko, Bulgaria
16:00	Ejike 17'		Bordeianu 4'	Stadium: Stadion Sveti Petar

27 June 2024 Friendly	Pirin Blagoevgrad (Bulgaria)	0–2	(Romania) Politehnica Iași
10:00			Jatobá 2'; Roman 86'

29 June 2024 Friendly	CSKA Sofia (Bulgaria)	2–1	(Romania) Politehnica Iași
16:30

2 July 2024 Friendly	Politehnica Iași (Romania)	2–2	(Serbia) FK Radnički Niš	Bansko, Bulgaria
16:00	Teixeira 3'; Roman 49' (pen.)		Ilić 15', 18' (pen.)	Stadium: Stadion Sveti Petar

6 July 2024 Friendly	Politehnica Iași (Romania)	0–3	(Moldova) Zimbru Chișinău
19:00

== Competitions ==
=== Overall record ===
Competition	First match	Last match	Starting round	Record							
Competition	First match	Last match	Starting round	Pld	W	D	L	GF	GA	GD	Win %
Liga I	13 July 2024		Matchday 1	4	1	0	3	2	5	−3	25.00
Cupa României				0	0	0	0	0	0	+0	—
Total				4	1	0	3	2	5	−3	25.00

Last updated: 3 August 2024
Source: Soccerway

=== Liga I ===
==== League table ====
Pos	Team	Pld	W	D	L	GF	GA	GD	Pts	Advances
11	UTA Arad	30	8	10	12	28	35	−7	34	Qualification for play-out round
12	Oțelul Galați	30	7	11	12	24	32	−8	32	Qualification for play-out round
13	Politehnica Iași	30	8	7	15	29	46	−17	31 (Note: Ranked on head-to-head points: Politehnica Iași (4); Botoșani (1).)	Qualification for play-out round
14	Botoșani	30	7	10	13	26	37	−11	31	Qualification for play-out round
15	Unirea Slobozia	30	7	5	18	28	47	−19	26	Qualification for play-out round

Source: LPF (in Romanian)
Rules for classification: 1) Points; 2) Head-to-head points; 3) Head-to-head goal difference; 4) Head-to-head goals scored; 5) Goal difference; 6) Goals scored; 7) Play-off.

==== Results summary ====
Overall								Home						Away					
Pld	W	D	L	GF	GA	GD	Pts	W	D	L	GF	GA	GD	W	D	L	GF	GA	GD
4	1	0	3	2	5	−3	3	1	0	1	2	2	0	0	0	2	0	3	−3

Last updated: 3 August 2024.

==== Results by round ====
Round	1	2	3	4	5	6	7	8	9	10	11	12	13	14	15	16	17	18	19	20	21	22	23	24	25	26	27	28	29	30
Ground	A	H	H	A	H	A	H	A	H	A	H	A	H	A	H	H	A	A	H	A	H	A	H	A	H	A	H	A	H	A
Result	L	W	L	L	D	W	L	L	W	D	W	L	W	L	W	L	D	D	D	L	L	L	L	L	L	D	D	D	W	W
Position	15	8	11	14	15	9	13	14	10	11	11	11	11	11	8	9	9	12	11	14	14	14	14	14	15	15	15	15	14	13

Updated to match(es) played on 9 March 2025. Source:
A = Away; H = Home; W = Win; D = Draw; L = Loss

=== Matches ===
The league schedule was announced on 1 July 2024.

13 July 2024 1	Sepsi OSK	1–0	Politehnica Iași	Sfântu Gheorghe
	Matei 23'		Mihai (yellow card) 79'	Stadium: Sepsi Arena; Referee: Marcel Bîrsan

19 July 2024 2	Politehnica Iași	1–0	FC Botoșani	Iași
	Bordeianu 6'			Stadium: Emil Alexandrescu Stadium

27 July 2024 3	Politehnica Iași	1–2	Gloria Buzău	Iași
	Tailson (yellow card) 12'; Roman 29' (red card) 45+6'; Tănasă (yellow card) 89'		Ricardo Matos 45+12', 52'; Turda (yellow card) 46'; Dobrosavlevici (yellow card) 59'; Prejmerean (yellow card) 71'; Tescan (yellow card) 71'; Čanađija (yellow card) 90+5'	Stadium: Emil Alexandrescu Stadium; Attendance: 3,877; Referee: Iulian Dima

3 August 2024 4	Farul Constanța	2–0	Politehnica Iași	Ovidiu
	Rivaldinho 33'; Iancu 45+10'			Stadium: Central Stadium; Attendance: 3,368

12 August 2024 5	Politehnica Iași	2–2	Dinamo București	Iași
	Bordeianu 13'; Samayoa 45+4'		Selmani 3' (pen.); Todor Todoroski (o.g.)	Stadium: Emil Alexandrescu Stadium; Attendance: 6,525; Referee: Sebastian Colțescu

17 August 2024 6	FCSB	0–1	Politehnica Iași	Bucharest
			Bordeianu 27'	Stadium: Steaua Stadium; Attendance: 4,525

23 August 2024 7	Politehnica Iași	1–2	Rapid București	Iași
	Gonçalo Teixeira 78'		Pașcanu 44'; Rareș Pop 53'	Stadium: Emil Alexandrescu Stadium

31 August 2024 8	Hermannstadt	6–2	Politehnica Iași	Sibiu
	Balaure 3', 58'; Deaconu 9'; Stoica 19'; Chițu 42'; Robert Popescu 78'		Gonçalo Teixeira 45+3'; Ștefanovici 82'	Stadium: Sibiu Municipal Stadium

15 September 2024 9	Politehnica Iași	2–0	Universitatea Craiova	Iași
	Kamberi 30'; Tailson 90+10'			Stadium: Emil Alexandrescu Stadium

23 September 2024 10	UTA Arad	0–0	Politehnica Iași	Arad
				Stadium: Francisc von Neuman Stadium

28 September 2024 11	Politehnica Iași	1–0	Universitatea Cluj	Iași
	Guilherme 50'			Stadium: Emil Alexandrescu Stadium

5 October 2024 12	CFR Cluj	2–1	Politehnica Iași	Cluj-Napoca
	Mohammed Kamara 10'; Louis Munteanu 16'		Bordeianu 88' (pen.)	Stadium: Dr. Constantin Rădulescu Stadium

21 October 2024 13	Politehnica Iași	1–0	Unirea Slobozia	Iași
	Gheorghiță 24'			Stadium: Emil Alexandrescu Stadium

26 October 2024 14	Petrolul Ploiești	3–1	Politehnica Iași	Ploiești
	Grozav 25'; Tudorie 53'; Bratu 88'		Bordeianu 20'	Stadium: Ilie Oană Stadium

3 November 2024 15	Politehnica Iași	2–1	Oțelul Galați	Iași
	Tailson 71'; Gheorghiță 74'		Maciel 2'	Stadium: Emil Alexandrescu Stadium; Attendance: 4,752; Referee: Marian Barbu

9 November 2024 16	Politehnica Iași	1–2	Sepsi OSK	Iași
	Kamberi 12'		Alimi 21'; Nešković 63'	Stadium: Emil Alexandrescu Stadium

25 November 2024 17	FC Botoșani	1–1	Politehnica Iași	Botoșani
	Chică-Roșă 29'		Gheorghiță 84'	Stadium: Municipal Stadium

30 November 2024 18	Gloria Buzău	2–0	Politehnica Iași	Buzău
	Ricardo Matos 81', 90+5'			Stadium: Municipal Stadium

8 December 2024 19	Politehnica Iași	2–2	Farul Constanța	Iași
	Guilherme 28'; Roman 79'		Rădăslăvescu 65'; Rivaldinho 69'	Stadium: Emil Alexandrescu Stadium

13 December 2024 20	Dinamo București	2–0	Politehnica Iași	Bucharest
	Politic 73'; Olsen 90+3'			Stadium: Arcul de Triumf Stadium

23 December 2024 21	Politehnica Iași	0–2	FCSB	Iași
			Olaru 44', 76'	Stadium: Emil Alexandrescu Stadium

20 January 2025 22	Rapid București	2–1	Politehnica Iași	Bucharest
	Petrila 20', 40' (pen.)		Tailson 35'	Stadium: Rapid-Giulești Stadium

25 January 2025 23	Politehnica Iași	0–2	Hermannstadt	Iași
			Stoica 55'; Tiago Gonçalves 76'	Stadium: Emil Alexandrescu Stadium

2 February 2025 24	Universitatea Craiova	4–1	Politehnica Iași	Craiova
	Baiaram 2'; Mitriță 42', 49'; Cicâldău 78'		Roman 45+1'	Stadium: Ion Oblemenco Stadium

6 February 2025 25	Politehnica Iași	0–1	UTA Arad	Iași
			Zsóri 79'	Stadium: Emil Alexandrescu Stadium

9 February 2025 26	Universitatea Cluj	2–2	Politehnica Iași	Cluj-Napoca
	Nistor 61', 77'		Camara 90'; Gouet 90+6'	Stadium: Cluj Arena

16 February 2025 27	Politehnica Iași	1–1	CFR Cluj	Iași
	Guilherme 63'		Korenica 5'	Stadium: Emil Alexandrescu Stadium

23 February 2025 28	Unirea Slobozia	0–0	Politehnica Iași	Clinceni
				Stadium: Clinceni Stadium

2 March 2025 29	Politehnica Iași	1–0	Petrolul Ploiești	Iași
	Denis Radu (o.g.)			Stadium: Emil Alexandrescu Stadium

7 March 2025 30	Oțelul Galați	2–3	Politehnica Iași	Galați
	Marković 17'; Tănasă 27'		Camara 38'; Marchioni 39'; Ștefanovici 90+6'	Stadium: Oțelul Stadium

== Play-out round ==
The bottom ten teams from the regular season met once to contest against relegation. Teams started the play-out round with their points from the regular season halved and rounded upwards, with no other records carried over from the regular season. Politehnica Iași finished the play-out round in seventh place and qualified for the relegation play-offs.

=== Play-out table ===
Pos	Team	Pld	W	D	L	GF	GA	GD	Pts	Qualification or relegation
7	Hermannstadt	9	4	3	2	12	8	+4	36	
8	Oțelul Galați	9	6	1	2	13	5	+8	35	
9	Petrolul Ploiești	9	3	2	4	10	10	0	31	
10	UTA Arad	9	4	2	3	9	11	−2	31	
11	Farul Constanța	9	3	4	2	12	9	+3	31	
12	Botoșani	9	4	1	4	11	12	−1	29	
13	Politehnica Iași (O)	9	3	3	3	9	5	+4	28	Qualification for the relegation play-offs
14	Unirea Slobozia (O)	9	3	5	1	11	8	+3	27	Qualification for the relegation play-offs
15	Sepsi OSK (R)	9	1	2	6	7	16	−9	26	Relegation to the 2025–26 Liga II
16	Gloria Buzău (R)	9	2	1	6	4	14	−10	17	Relegation to the 2025–26 Liga II

Source: Soccerway, FRF (in Romanian), LPF (in Romanian)
Rules for classification: 1) Points; 2) Points without rounding; 3) Points in the regular season; 4) Head-to-head points; 5) Head-to-head goal difference; 6) Head-to-head goals scored; 7) Goal difference; 8) Goals scored; 9) Play-off, only if required to determine relegation.
(O) Play-off winners; (R) Relegated

=== Play-out matches ===
15 March 2025 1	Farul Constanța	0–0	Politehnica Iași	Ovidiu
18:00	Nicolas Popescu (yellow card) 67'			Stadium: Central Stadium

30 March 2025 2	Politehnica Iași	4–0	UTA Arad	Iași
15:00				Stadium: Emil Alexandrescu Stadium; Attendance: 1,558; Referee: Adrian Cojocaru

4 April 2025 3	Oțelul Galați	1–0	Politehnica Iași	Galați
17:30	Tănasă 35'			Stadium: Oțelul Stadium; Referee: Marian Barbu

11 April 2025 4	Gloria Buzău	0–1	Politehnica Iași	Buzău
17:30			Skuka 2'	Stadium: Municipal Stadium; Attendance: 800; Referee: George Găman

20 April 2025 5	Politehnica Iași	3–0	FC Botoșani	Iași
17:00	Bordeianu 13' (pen.); Skuka 20'; Camara 74'			Stadium: Emil Alexandrescu Stadium; Attendance: 3,910; Referee: Radu Petrescu

25 April 2025 6	Unirea Slobozia	1–1	Politehnica Iași	Clinceni
18:45	Șerbănică 45+1'; Coadă (red card) 57'		Marchioni 67'; Camara (red card) 90+1'	Stadium: Clinceni Stadium; Attendance: 358; Referee: Adrian Cojocaru

2 May 2025 7	Politehnica Iași	0–0	Sepsi OSK	Iași
				Stadium: Emil Alexandrescu Stadium

10 May 2025 8	Hermannstadt	1–0	Politehnica Iași	Sibiu
17:30	Stoica 59'			Stadium: Sibiu Municipal Stadium; Attendance: 6,500; Referee: Ovidiu Robu

18 May 2025 9	Politehnica Iași	0–2	Petrolul Ploiești	Iași
16:00	Bordeianu (penalty missed)		Keita 33'; Grozav 39'	Stadium: Emil Alexandrescu Stadium

== Promotion/relegation play-offs ==
The 13th and 14th-placed teams of Liga I faced the third and fourth-placed teams of the Liga II.

Team 1	Aggregate	Team 2	First leg	Second leg
Politehnica Iași	1–2	Metaloglobus București	1–1	0–1

Politehnica Iași faced Metaloglobus București, the fifth-placed eligible team from the 2024–25 Liga II, in a two-legged promotion/relegation play-off. Metaloglobus won 2–1 on aggregate, and Politehnica Iași were relegated to the 2025–26 Liga II.

25 May 2025 First leg	Politehnica Iași	1–1	Metaloglobus București	Iași
15:00	Ștefanovici 12'		Huiban 86'	Stadium: Emil Alexandrescu Stadium; Attendance: 2,332; Referee: István Kovács

1 June 2025 Second leg	Metaloglobus București	1–0	Politehnica Iași	Clinceni
21:00	Huiban 85'		João Oliveira (yellow card) 53'	Stadium: Clinceni Stadium; Attendance: 680; Referee: Adrian Cojocaru

Metaloglobus București won 2–1 on aggregate.

=== Cupa României ===
Politehnica Iași entered the competition in the group stage and was drawn in Group C alongside Farul Constanța, Hermannstadt, UTA Arad, Unirea Ungheni and Sănătatea Cluj. The team finished level on points, goal difference and goals scored with Hermannstadt, requiring an additional play-off match to determine the second team qualified for the quarter-finals.

==== Group stage ====
29 October 2024 Group C Round 1	Politehnica Iași	1–1	UTA Arad	Iași
18:00	Harrison 30'	Report	Fábry 56'	Stadium: Emil Alexandrescu Stadium; Attendance: 3,200; Referee: Cristian Moldoveanu

5 December 2024 Group C Round 2	Sănătatea Cluj	1–2	Politehnica Iași	Cluj-Napoca
	Lensalio Fofana 36'	Report	Mišković 47'; Mohammed Umar 52'	Stadium: Clujana Stadium; Attendance: 250; Referee: Cătălin Buși

18 December 2024 Group C Round 3	Politehnica Iași	0–0	Hermannstadt	Iași
17:00		Report		Stadium: Emil Alexandrescu Stadium; Attendance: 1,108

==== Qualification play-off ====
26 February 2025 Qualification play-off	Politehnica Iași	0–1 (a.e.t.)	Hermannstadt	Iași
19:00	Samayoa (yellow card) 15'	Report	Stoica 111'	Stadium: Emil Alexandrescu Stadium; Attendance: 1,238; Referee: Szabolcs Kovács
