= 2026–27 Liga II =

Liga II
- Season: 2026–27
- Dates: 1 August 2026 – May 2027
- All statistics correct as of 29 July 2026.

The 2026–27 Liga II (also known as Liga 2 Casa Pariurilor for sponsorship reasons) is the 87th season of Liga II, the second tier of the Romanian football league system, and the eleventh consecutive season held in a single series. The competition calendar was approved by the executive committee of the Romanian Football Federation (FRF) on 26 May 2026, and the regular-season schedule was drawn on 22 July 2026. The season began on 1 August 2026.

The format has been maintained, with a regular season contested by twenty-two teams in a single round-robin tournament. The top six teams at the end of the regular season advance to the promotion play-offs. The first two teams in the play-offs will be promoted to Liga I, while the third- and fourth-placed teams will play a promotion/relegation play-off against the 13th- and 14th-placed teams from Liga I.

The remaining sixteen teams will compete in the relegation play-outs, divided into two groups. The last two teams from each group will be relegated to Liga III. Additionally, the sixth-placed teams from each play-out group will face each other in a play-off to decide the final team to be relegated.

== Teams ==
A total of twenty-two teams contested the league, including fifteen from the previous season, two relegated from Liga I, and five promoted from Liga III. The participating clubs were admitted through the FRF certification or Liga I licensing procedures.

=== Team changes ===
To Liga II

Relegated from Liga I

- Metaloglobus București – after one year in the top flight.
- Unirea Slobozia – after two years in the top flight.

Promoted from Liga III

- Cetatea Suceava – after sixteen years of absence.
- Ștefănești – debut.
- Râmnicu Vâlcea – after ten years of absence.
- Politehnica Timișoara – after three years of absence.
- Popești-Leordeni – debut.

From Liga II

Promoted to Liga I

- Corvinul Hunedoara – ended a three-year stay.
- Sepsi Sfântu Gheorghe – ended a one-year stay.
- Voluntari – ended a two-year stay.

Relegated to Liga III

- Ceahlăul Piatra Neamț – ended a three-year stay.
- Câmpulung Muscel – ended a two-year stay.
- Tunari – ended a one-year stay.

Other changes

- Politehnica Iași withdrew from Liga II due to financial problems.
- Hermannstadt, which was relegated to Liga II at the end of the 2025–26 Liga I season, also withdrew due to financial problems.
- Following the withdrawal of two clubs, Dinamo București and Olimpia Satu Mare were spared from relegation.

=== Stadiums and locations ===
Locations of the 2026–27 Liga II teams
Locations of Bucharest and nearby Ilfov teams.

Club	City	Stadium	Capacity
ASA Târgu Mureș	Târgu Mureș	Trans-Sil	8,200
Cetatea Suceava	Suceava	Areni	7,000
Chindia Târgoviște	Târgoviște	Eugen Popescu	8,400
Concordia Chiajna	Chiajna	Concordia	5,123
CS Afumați	Afumați	CNAF (Note: Afumați was relocated to the CNAF Stadium in Buftea, because Comunal Stadium in Afumați is under renovations)	1,600
CS Dinamo București	București	Baza Sportivă Oxigen (Note: Dinamo București was relocated to Baza Sportivă Oxigen as the new Dinamo Stadium is currently under construction.)	6,000
CSC 1599 Șelimbăr	Șelimbăr	Măgura (Note: 1599 Șelimbăr was relocated to the Măgura Stadium in Cisnădie as the Comunal Stadium in Șelimbăr is under renovations.)	2,450
CSC Dumbrăvița	Dumbrăvița	Ștefan Dobay	500
CSL Ștefănești	Ștefăneștii de Jos	Dumitru Mătărău	1,150
CSM Reșița	Reșița	Mircea Chivu	12,500
CSM Slatina	Slatina	1 Mai	12,000
FC Bacău	Ruși-Ciutea	Ruși-Ciutea	700
FC Bihor Oradea	Oradea	Iuliu Bodola	12,376
Gloria Bistrița	Bistrița	Jean Pădureanu	7,814
Metalul Buzău	Buzău	Municipal (Note: Metalul Buzău relocated to Buzău Municipal Stadium on 29 August 2026, having played its first home matches at Metalul Stadium.)	12,321
Metaloglobus București	Bucharest	Clinceni (Note: Metaloglobus will play their home matches at Clinceni Stadium in Clinceni, instead of their regular stadium, Metaloglobus Stadium, which does not meet the Liga II requirements.)	4,500
Olimpia Satu Mare	Satu Mare	Daniel Prodan	18,000
Politehnica Timișoara	Timișoara	Electrica	5,000
SC Popești-Leordeni	Popești-Leordeni	Clinceni (Note: Popești-Leordeni will play their home matches at Clinceni Stadium in Clinceni, instead of their regular stadium, Inter Gaz Stadium, which does not meet Liga II requirements.)	4,500
SCM Râmnicu Vâlcea	Râmnicu Vâlcea	Municipal	12,000
Steaua București	București	Steaua	31,254
Unirea Slobozia	Slobozia	1 Mai	6,000

=== Personnel and kits ===
Note: Flags indicate national team as has been defined under FIFA eligibility rules. Players and Managers may hold more than one non-FIFA nationality.

Team	Manager	Captain
1599 Șelimbăr	(Romania) Ion Luca	(Romania) Ciprian Natea
Afumați	(Romania) Vasile Neagu	(Romania) Ionuț Zaina
ASA Târgu Mureș	(Romania) Eusebiu Tudor	(Romania) Florin Iacob
Bacău	(Romania) Costel Enache	(Romania) Ionuț Chirilă
Bihor Oradea	(Romania) Erik Lincar	(Romania) Ioan Filip
Cetatea Suceava	(Romania) Petre Grigoraș	(Romania) Andrei Cerlincă
Chindia Târgoviște	(Romania) Leontin Grozavu	(Romania) Georgian Honciu
Concordia Chiajna	(Romania) Adrian Scarlatache	(Romania) Mihai Bălașa
Dinamo București	(Romania) Ionuț Chirilă	(Romania) Rareș Cernamoriț
Dumbrăvița	(Romania) Florin Fabian	(Romania) Alin Șeroni
Gloria Bistrița	(Romania) Nicolae Grigore	(Romania) Alexandru Greab
Metaloglobus București	(Romania) Ianis Zicu	(Romania) Florin Purece
Metalul Buzău	(Romania) Valentin Stan	(Romania) Claudiu Borțoneanu
Olimpia Satu Mare	(Romania) Róbert Ilyés	(Romania) Rareș Corodan
Politehnica Timișoara	(Romania) Dan Alexa	(Romania) Andrei Artean
Popești-Leordeni	(Romania) Cătălin Gheorghe	(Romania) Luca Pătrășcoiu
Râmnicu Vâlcea	(Romania) Constantin Schumacher	(Romania) Alexandru Dandea
Reșița	(Romania) Dorinel Munteanu	(Romania) Alin Dudea
Slatina	(Romania) Adrian Dulcea	(Romania) Ionuț Năstăsie
Steaua București	(Romania) Daniel Oprița	(Romania) Adrian Ilie
Ștefănești	(Romania) Mircea Gheorghe	(Romania) Samuel Zimța
Unirea Slobozia	(Romania) Ilie Poenaru	(Romania) Constantin Toma

=== Managerial changes ===
==== Pre-season ====
Team	Outgoing manager	Manner	Date of vacancy	Replaced by	Date of arrival
Slatina	(Romania) Viorel Ferfelea	Mutual consent	1 June 2026	(Romania) Adrian Dulcea	2 June 2026
Reșița	(Romania) Leontin Doană	Mutual consent	1 June 2026	(Romania) Dorinel Munteanu	9 June 2026
Concordia Chiajna	(Romania) Andrei Cristea	Mutual consent	1 June 2026	(Romania) Adrian Scarlatache	12 June 2026
Unirea Slobozia	(Romania) Claudiu Niculescu	Mutual consent	1 June 2026	(Romania) Ilie Poenaru	12 June 2026
Metaloglobus București	(Romania) Florin Bratu	Mutual consent	1 June 2026	(Romania) Ianis Zicu	25 June 2026
Olimpia Satu Mare	(Romania) Alexandru Botoș	Mutual consent	1 June 2026	(Romania) Alexandru Pelici	1 July 2026
Dinamo București	(Romania) Ionel Dănciulescu	Mutual consent	1 June 2026	(Romania) Ionuț Chirilă	8 July 2026
Ștefănești	(Romania) Laurențiu Tudor	Sacked	8 July 2026	(Romania) Mircea Gheorghe	13 July 2026

==== During the season ====
Team	Outgoing manager	Manner	Date of vacancy	Position in table		Replaced by	Date of appointment
Team	Outgoing manager	Manner	Date of vacancy	Round	Position	Replaced by	Date of appointment
Chindia Târgoviște	(Romania) Nicolae Croitoru	Sacked	24 August 2026	4th	9th	(Romania) Leontin Grozavu	27 August 2026
Olimpia Satu Mare	(Romania) Alexandru Pelici	Sacked	23 September 2026	8th	20th	(Romania) Róbert Ilyés	24 September 2026
1599 Șelimbăr	(Romania) Eugen Beza	Sacked	12 October 2026	9th	18th	(Romania) Ion Luca	12 October 2026

== Regular season ==
=== League table ===
Pos	Team	Pld	W	D	L	GF	GA	GD	Pts	Qualification
1	Chindia Târgoviște	13	10	0	3	34	15	+19	30	Qualification for Promotion play-off
2	Politehnica Timișoara	12	8	4	0	23	10	+13	28	Qualification for Promotion play-off
3	Slatina (Note: 1599 Șelimbăr, Afumați, Cetatea Suceava, Dinamo București, Dumbrăvița, Gloria Bistrița, Olimpia Satu Mare, Popești-Leordeni, Râmnicu Vâlcea, Slatina, Steaua București and Ștefănești are ineligible for promotion due to their legal status.)	13	9	1	3	21	12	+9	28	Qualification for Promotion play-off
4	Popești-Leordeni	13	8	3	2	29	20	+9	27	Qualification for Promotion play-off
5	Concordia Chiajna	13	8	1	4	33	19	+14	25	Qualification for Promotion play-off
6	Reșița	12	8	0	4	17	13	+4	24	Qualification for Promotion play-off
7	Cetatea Suceava	13	6	4	3	25	17	+8	22	Qualification for Relegation play-out
8	Metalul Buzău	12	6	3	3	14	9	+5	21	Qualification for Relegation play-out
9	Metaloglobus București	13	6	3	4	18	16	+2	21	Qualification for Relegation play-out
10	Gloria Bistrița	13	7	0	6	18	16	+2	21	Qualification for Relegation play-out
11	Bacău	13	5	4	4	24	15	+9	19	Qualification for Relegation play-out
12	Bihor Oradea	13	5	4	4	20	13	+7	19	Qualification for Relegation play-out
13	Afumați	13	5	3	5	20	21	−1	18	Qualification for Relegation play-out
14	Unirea Slobozia	13	4	2	7	17	15	+2	14	Qualification for Relegation play-out
15	Râmnicu Vâlcea	12	4	2	6	13	19	−6	14	Qualification for Relegation play-out
16	Steaua București	12	2	5	5	13	19	−6	11	Qualification for Relegation play-out
17	ASA Târgu Mureș	13	3	2	8	14	27	−13	11	Qualification for Relegation play-out
18	Olimpia Satu Mare	13	1	6	6	9	17	−8	9	Qualification for Relegation play-out
19	1599 Șelimbăr	13	2	3	8	8	24	−16	9	Qualification for Relegation play-out
20	Ștefănești	13	3	0	10	9	29	−20	9	Qualification for Relegation play-out
21	Dinamo București	12	2	2	8	16	32	−16	8	Qualification for Relegation play-out
22	Dumbrăvița	13	0	4	9	9	26	−17	4	Qualification for Relegation play-out

Updated to match(es) played on 7 November 2026. Source: FRF (in Romanian)
Rules for classification: During season: 1) Points; 2) Goal difference; 3) Goals scored. End of season: 1) Points; 2) Head-to-head points; 3) Head-to-head goal difference; 4) Goal difference; 5) Goals scored

=== Results ===
Home \ Away	CHI	PTM	SLA	POP	CON	REȘ	CET	MBZ	MET	GLO	BAC	BIH	AFU	USL	RMV	STE	ASA	OSM	ȘEL	ȘTE	DIN	DUM
Chindia Târgoviște				4–1	3–2		–		3–1	–					–			3–2	4–0		1–2	–
Poli Timișoara	1–0		–			–			–		1–0	–		1–0		1–1	3–0			2–1	–	
Slatina	3–2			–	1–2			2–0						1–0			–	–	2–1	–	5–1	
Popești-Leordeni		3–4			–	4–1		2–1			3–2	3–2	2–0			–		–	–			
Concordia Chiajna		1–5				–		0–1			–	2–0	1–2			–	5–0		5–0	–		
Reșița	–		3–1				0–2		–	1–0	0–1			–		2–1	2–1			2–0	–	
Cetatea Suceava		–	2–0	1–1	1–3			–				2–2	–		4–0			2–0	–			3–1
Metalul Buzău	1–3	–				–					–	–	3–1	2–0		–	1–0			3–0		
Metaloglobus			–	0–3	1–3		–	0–0		–			–		2–0			1–1	3–1			1–0
Gloria Bistrița		–	–	2–3	1–2		3–1	–					–		1–0			1–0	2–1			2–1
Bacău	–		0–0				2–2		1–4	3–0				–		3–0	–			3–0	–	6–1
Bihor Oradea	–		0–1			2–0			–	–	1–0			1–1		3–0	1–1			4–0	–	
Afumați	0–3	–	–			–					1–1	–		2–1		1–3	2–2			4–0	2–1	
Unirea Slobozia	0–1			–	2–2		–		1–2	0–3					–			2–0			8–0	–
Râmnicu Vâlcea		0–1	0–1	1–1	–	1–2		–			2–2	3–2	3–2					–	–			
Steaua București	–		1–2				2–2		0–0	2–1				–	1–2		–			–	0–0	2–2
ASA Târgu Mureș	2–4			–			0–2		3–2	1–0				0–1	–			–			4–3	–
Olimpia Satu Mare		1–1			–	0–2		0–0			–	0–0	0–2			–			2–0	–		
1599 Șelimbăr		1–1				–		1–1			–	–	1–1	0–1		–	1–0			0–2		
Ștefănești	0–3			–			3–1		0–1	1–2				–	–		–				1–4	1–0
Dinamo București				1–2	2–5		–	0–1	–	–					–			2–2	0–1			–
Dumbrăvița		2–2	0–2	1–1	–	0–2		–				0–2	–		0–1			1–3	–			

Updated to match(es) played on 7 November 2026. Source: FRF
Legend: Blue = home team win; Yellow = draw; Red = away team win.

== Season statistics ==
Regular season, promotion play-off and relegation play-out overall statistics

=== Top scorers ===
As of 7 November 2026

Rank	Player	Club	Regular	Play-off	Play-out	Total
1	(Nigeria) Quadri Olakunle Taiwo	Popești-Leordeni	15	0	0	15
2	(Romania) Rareș Mihai	Chindia Târgoviște	9	0	0	9
3	(Romania) Gabriel Răducan	Cetatea Suceava	8	0	0	8
3	(Albania) Din Sula	Concordia Chiajna	8	0	0	8
4	(Romania) Valentin Robu	Metalul Buzău	7	0	0	7
6	(Guinea) Sekou Camara	Chindia Târgoviște	6	0	0	6
6	(Romania) Ianis Doană	Politehnica Timișoara	6	0	0	6

=== Hat-tricks ===
As of 1 November 2026

Player	For	Against	Result	Date	Round
(Nigeria) Quadri Olakunle Taiwo	Popești-Leordeni	Reșița	4–1 (H)	22 August 2026	4
(Romania) Ianis Doană (Note: Player scored four goals.)	Concordia Chiajna	Politehnica Timișoara	1–5 (A)	22 August 2026	4
(Nigeria) Quadri Olakunle Taiwo	Metaloglobus București	Popești-Leordeni	0–3 (A)	10 October 2026	9

== See also ==
- 2026–27 Liga I
- 2026–27 Liga III
- 2026–27 Liga IV
- 2026–27 Cupa României
