= 2024–25 FC Gloria Buzău season =

FC Gloria Buzău
2024–25 season
- Manager: Andrei Prepeliță (until 4 September 2024); Eugen Neagoe (until 10 March 2025); Ilie Stan
- Stadium: Buzău Municipal Stadium
- Liga I: 16th
- Cupa României: Play-off Round
- Average home league attendance: 2,470
- Biggest defeat: Dinamo București 4–1 Gloria Buzău
Home colours	Away colours	Third colours

The 2024–25 season is the 52nd season in the history of FC Gloria Buzău. Gloria will make a return to Liga I this season after 15 years in lower divisions. In addition to the domestic league, the team is scheduled to participate in the Cupa României.

== Transfers ==
=== In ===
Pos.	Player	Transferred from	Fee	Date	Source
GK	(Moldova) Dorian Railean	(Romania) Dinamo București	Free	1 July 2024	
FW	(Romania) Constantin Budescu	(Romania) Farul Constanța	Free	1 July 2024	

== Friendlies ==
=== Pre-season ===
15 June 2024 Friendly	Hermannstadt (Romania)	1–0	(Romania) Gloria Buzău
17:00	Bejan 15'

20 June 2024 Friendly	Rapid București (Romania)	4–1	(Romania) Gloria Buzău
09:00

26 June 2024 Friendly	Olimpija Ljubljana (Slovenia)	2–0	(Romania) Gloria Buzău	Slovenia
18:00

30 June 2024 Friendly	NK Radomlje (Slovenia)	2–2	(Romania) Gloria Buzău	Radomlje, Slovenia
17:30	27'; 35'		11' (pen.); 67'	Stadium: Športni park Radomlje

3 July 2024 Friendly	Gloria Buzău (Romania)	1–1	(Bulgaria) Hebar Pazardzhik	Slovenia
17:30	67'		10'

=== Mid-season ===
7 January 2025 Friendly	Kastamonuspor (Turkey)	1–2	(Romania) Gloria Buzău

9 January 2025 Friendly	Gloria Buzău (Romania)	2–0	(Azerbaijan) Turan Tovuz

12 January 2025 Friendly	Gloria Buzău (Romania)	4–3	(Serbia) Mladost Lučani

== Competitions ==
=== Overall record ===
Competition	First match	Last match	Starting round	Record							
Competition	First match	Last match	Starting round	Pld	W	D	L	GF	GA	GD	Win %
Liga I	15 July 2024		Matchday 1	4	1	1	2	4	7	−3	25.00
Cupa României				0	0	0	0	0	0	+0	—
Total				4	1	1	2	4	7	−3	25.00

Last updated: 2 August 2024
Source: Soccerway

=== Liga I ===
==== League table ====
Pos	Team	Pld	W	D	L	GF	GA	GD	Pts	Advances
12	Oțelul Galați	30	7	11	12	24	32	−8	32	Qualification for play-out round
13	Politehnica Iași	30	8	7	15	29	46	−17	31 (Note: Ranked on head-to-head points: Politehnica Iași (4); Botoșani (1).)	Qualification for play-out round
14	Botoșani	30	7	10	13	26	37	−11	31	Qualification for play-out round
15	Unirea Slobozia	30	7	5	18	28	47	−19	26	Qualification for play-out round
16	Gloria Buzău	30	5	5	20	25	51	−26	20	Qualification for play-out round

Source: LPF (in Romanian)
Rules for classification: 1) Points; 2) Head-to-head points; 3) Head-to-head goal difference; 4) Head-to-head goals scored; 5) Goal difference; 6) Goals scored; 7) Play-off.

==== Results summary ====
Overall								Home						Away					
Pld	W	D	L	GF	GA	GD	Pts	W	D	L	GF	GA	GD	W	D	L	GF	GA	GD
4	1	1	2	4	7	−3	4	0	0	1	1	2	−1	1	1	1	3	5	−2

Last updated: 2 August 2024.

==== Results by round ====
Round	1	2	3	4
Ground	A	H	A	A
Result	D	L	W	L
Position	9	11	7	10

Updated to match(es) played on 2 August 2024. Source:
A = Away; H = Home; W = Win; D = Draw; L = Loss

==== Matches ====
The match schedule was released on 1 July 2024.

15 July 2024 1	Petrolul Ploiești	0–0	Gloria Buzău	Ploiești
21:30 UTC+3	Huja (yellow card) 39'; Grozav (penalty missed) 58'; Hanca (yellow card) 63'		Călin (yellow card) 11'; Sălceanu (yellow card) 48'	Stadium: Ilie Oană Stadium; Attendance: 6,500; Referee: István Kovács

22 July 2024 2	Gloria Buzău	1–2	Sepsi OSK	Buzău
18:30 UTC+3	Tescan 86'		Ciobotariu 12'; Coman 30'	Stadium: Buzău Municipal Stadium; Referee: Iulian Călin

27 July 2024 3	Politehnica Iași	1–2	Gloria Buzău	Iași
19:00 UTC+3	Tailson (yellow card) 12'; Roman 29', (penalty missed) 45+6'; Tănasă (yellow card) 89'		Matos 45+12', 52'; Turda (yellow card) 46'; Dobrosavlevici (yellow card) 59'; Prejmerean (yellow card) 71'; Tescan (yellow card) 71'; Čanađija (yellow card) 90+5'	Stadium: Emil Alexandrescu Stadium; Referee: Iulian Dima

2 August 2024 4	Dinamo București	4–1	Gloria Buzău	Bucharest
22:00 UTC+3	Politic 10', 84'; Opruț 27'; Selmani 80'		Boateng 53' (o.g.)	Stadium: Arcul de Triumf Stadium; Referee: Szabolcs Kovács

10 August 2024 5	Gloria Buzău	1–1	Rapid București	Buzău
22:00 EET	Čanađija (yellow card) 27'; Prepeliță (yellow card) 41'; Budescu 77' (pen.); Dumitru (yellow card) 81'		Papeau 10'	Stadium: Buzău Municipal Stadium; Referee: Horațiu Feșnic

16 August 2024 6	Universitatea Craiova	5–1	Gloria Buzău	Craiova
22:00 EET	Paradela (yellow card) 32'; Maldonado 35' (yellow card) 49'; Bană 45'; Mitriță 63' (yellow card) 77'; Mekvabishvili 73'; Căpățînă 84'		Ricardo Matos (yellow card) 19'; Ferraresso (yellow card) 52'; Budescu 67'; Dobrosavlevici (yellow card) 88'	Stadium: Ion Oblemenco Stadium; Referee: George Cătălin Roman

26 August 2024 7	Gloria Buzău	0–2	Universitatea Cluj	Buzău
19:00 EEST (UTC+3)			Nistor 27' (pen.); Thiam 43'	Stadium: Municipal

=== Play-off-Round ===
29 August 2024	CS Afumați	1–1 (a.e.t.) (5–3 p)	Gloria Buzău	Afumați
17:30 EEST (UTC+03)	Zaina 119' (pen.)		Benzar 95'	Stadium: Comunal; Referee: Robert Avram
