= 2024–25 Liga II =

Liga II
- Season: 2024–25
- Champions: Argeș Pitești
- Promoted: Argeș Pitești; Csíkszereda Miercurea Ciuc; Metaloglobus București
- Relegated: Dumbrăvița; Focșani; Câmpulung Muscel; Mioveni (excluded); Viitorul Pandurii Târgu Jiu (excluded)

The 2024–25 Liga II (also known as Liga 2 Casa Pariurilor for sponsorship reasons) was the 85th season of Liga II, the second tier of the Romanian football league system, and the ninth consecutive season held in a single series.

The format from the previous season was maintained, but the number of participating teams was increased from twenty to twenty-two. The regular season was contested in a single round-robin tournament. The top six teams at the end of the regular season advanced to the promotion play-offs. The first two teams in the play-offs were promoted to Liga I, while the third- and fourth-placed teams played promotion/relegation play-offs against the 13th- and 14th-placed teams from Liga I.

The remaining sixteen teams competed in the relegation play-outs, divided into two groups. The last two teams from each group were relegated to Liga III. Additionally, the sixth-placed teams from each play-out group faced each other in a play-off to determine the final team to be relegated.

== Teams ==
=== Team changes ===
To Liga II

Relegated from Liga I

- Voluntari – returned after nine years in the top flight.
- FCU 1948 Craiova – returned after three years in the top flight.

Promoted from Liga III

- Metalul Buzău – debut.
- Afumați – returned after six years of absence.
- Câmpulung Muscel – debut.
- Bihor Oradea – returned after eight years of absence.
- Unirea Ungheni – debut.
- Focșani – returned after sixteen years of absence.

From Liga II

Promoted to Liga I

- Unirea Slobozia – ended a four-year stay.
- Gloria Buzău – ended a five-year stay.

Relegated to Liga III

- Tunari – ended a one-year stay.
- Unirea Dej – ended a three-year stay.
- Alexandria – ended a one-year stay.
- Progresul Spartac București – ended a two-year stay.

=== Stadiums and locations ===
Locations of the 2024–25 Liga II teams
Location of Bucharest and Ilfov teams.

Club	Locație	Stadion	Capacitate
AFC Câmpulung Muscel	Câmpulung	Muscelul	3.000
Ceahlăul Piatra Neamț	Piatra Neamț	Ceahlăul	18.000
Chindia Târgoviște	Târgoviște	Eugen Popescu	8.400
Concordia Chiajna	Chiajna	Concordia	5.123
Corvinul Hunedoara	Hunedoara	Complexul Sportiv Corvinul	16.500
Csíkszereda Miercurea Ciuc	Miercurea Ciuc	Municipal	2.480
CS Afumați	Afumați	Comunal	2.000
CS Mioveni	Mioveni	Orășenesc	10.000
CSC 1599 Șelimbăr	Șelimbăr	Măgura (Note: 1599 Șelimbăr was relocated to the Măgura Stadium in Cisnădie, because Comunal Stadium in Șelimbăr is under renovations.)	2.450
CSC Dumbrăvița	Dumbrăvița	Ștefan Dobay	500
CSM Focșani	Focșani	Milcovul	8.500
CSM Reșița	Reșița	Mircea Chivu	12.500
CSM Slatina	Slatina	1 Mai	12.000
FC Argeș Pitești	Pitești	Nicolae Dobrin	15,000
FC Bihor Oradea	Oradea	Iuliu Bodola	12.376
FC Voluntari	Voluntari	Anghel Iordănescu	4.600
FCU 1948 Craiova	Craiova	Complex Sportiv Craiova (Note: FCU 1948 Craiova played its home matches from the relegation play-out at the Municipal Stadium in Drobeta-Turnu Severin.)	30.983
Metalul Buzău	Buzău	Metalul	1.573
Metaloglobus București	București	Metaloglobus	1.000
Steaua București	București	Steaua	31.254
Unirea Ungheni	Ungheni	Central	2.000
Viitorul Pandurii Târgu Jiu	Târgu Jiu	Constantina Diță-Tomescu	12.518

=== Personnel and kits ===
Note: Flags indicate national team as has been defined under FIFA eligibility rules. Players and Managers may hold more than one non-FIFA nationality.

Team	Manager	Captain	Kit manufacturer	Shirt sponsor
1599 Șelimbăr	(Romania) Ioan Luca	(Romania) Ciprian Natea	Nike	Shopping City Sibiu
Afumați	(Romania) Vasile Neagu	(Romania) Ionuț Zaina	Nike	—
Argeș Pitești	(Romania) Bogdan Andone	(Romania) Costinel Tofan	Macron	Getica 95
Bihor Oradea	(Romania) Erik Lincar	(Romania) Ioan Hora	Macron	Viva Chips
Câmpulung Muscel	(Romania) Alecsandru Popovici	(Romania) Ștefan Ghiță	Nike	Superbet
Ceahlăul Piatra Neamț	(Italy) Marco Veronese	(Romania) Patrick Petre	Nike	SSAB Impex
Chindia Târgoviște	(Romania) Costel Pană	(Romania) Cornel Dinu	Macron	—
Concordia Chiajna	(Romania) Nicolae Dică	(Romania) Adrian Bălan	Joma	—
Corvinul Hunedoara	(Romania) Florin Maxim	(Romania) Alexandru Neacșa	Joma	Prodesign, ArcelorMittal
Csíkszereda Miercurea Ciuc	(Romania) Róbert Ilyés	(Slovakia) Peter Gál-Andrezly	2Rule	Csíkszereda, MOL
Dumbrăvița	(Romania) Cosmin Stan	(Romania) Costel Zurbagiu	Macron	Artoil
FCU 1948 Craiova	(Romania) Valentin David	(Italy) Andrea Padula	Adidas	Ediție Specială
Focșani	(Romania) Alin Chița	(Romania) Sorin Săpunaru	Erima	Consiliul Local Focșani, Primăria Focșani, Scorpion
Metalul Buzău	(Romania) Valentin Stan	(Romania) Marius Tudorică	Macron	Consiliul Județean Buzău
Metaloglobus București	(Romania) Ianis Zicu	(Romania) Georgian Honciu	Jako	—
Mioveni	(Romania) Dragoș Stroe	(Romania) Flavius Croitoru	Macron	—
Reșița	(Romania) Flavius Stoican	(Romania) Alin Dudea	Puma	Invest in Reșița
Slatina	(Romania) Claudiu Niculescu	(Romania) Cătălin Doman	Macron	Primăria Slatina
Steaua București	(Romania) Daniel Oprița	(Romania) Bogdan Chipirliu	Adidas	Stanleybet International
Unirea Ungheni	(Romania) Eusebiu Tudor	(Romania) Victoraș Astafei	Nike	Terra Luxury
Viitorul Pandurii Târgu Jiu	(Romania) Călin Cojocaru	(Croatia) Arian Mršulja	Nike	Târg Auto OLTENIA
Voluntari	(Romania) Florian Pârvu	(Moldova) Igor Armaș	Nike	Metropola TV

=== Managerial changes ===
==== Pre-season ====
Team	Outgoing manager	Manner	Date of vacancy	Replaced by	Date of arrival
1599 Șelimbăr	(Romania) Claudiu Niculescu	Mutual consent	8 May 2024	(Romania) Constantin Schumacher	28 June 2024
FCU 1948 Craiova	(Romania) Eugen Trică	Mutual consent	12 May 2024	(Romania) Marius Croitoru	28 May 2024
Ceahlăul Piatra Neamț	(Romania) Cristian Pustai	Mutual consent	18 May 2024	(Italy) Marco Veronese	1 July 2024
Chindia Târgoviște	(Italy) Diego Longo	End of contract	30 May 2024	(Romania) Marian Vătavu	27 June 2024
Voluntari	(Romania) Florian Pârvu	End of contract	6 June 2024	(Romania) Claudiu Niculescu	6 June 2024
Unirea Ungheni	(Romania) Florentin Petre	Mutual consent	10 June 2024	(Romania) Eusebiu Tudor	15 June 2024
Bihor Oradea	(Romania) Florin Farcaș	Sacked	13 June 2024	(Argentina) Gustavo Aragolaza	23 June 2024

==== During the season ====
Team	Outgoing manager	Manner	Date of vacancy	Position in table		Replaced by	Date of appointment
Team	Outgoing manager	Manner	Date of vacancy	Round	Position	Replaced by	Date of appointment
Câmpulung Muscel	(Romania) Costin Lazăr	Sacked	10 September 2024	5th	19th	(Romania) Marius Bratu	17 September 2024
Focșani	(Romania) Călin Moldovan	Sacked	18 September 2024	6th	20th	(Romania) Rareș Forika (interim)	18 September 2024
Argeș Pitești	(Romania) Nicolae Dică	Sacked	21 September 2024	7th	13th	(Romania) Bogdan Andone	22 September 2024
Focșani	(Romania) Rareș Forika	End of interim spell	1 October 2024	8th	21st	(Romania) Sorin Colceag	1 October 2024
FCU 1948 Craiova	(Romania) Marius Croitoru	Mutual agreement	22 October 2024	10th	12th	(Romania) Valentin David	22 October 2024
Mioveni	(Romania) Alin Chița	Resigned	29 October 2024	11th	21st	(Romania) Dragoș Stroe	2 November 2024
Câmpulung Muscel	(Romania) Marius Bratu	Sacked	3 November 2024	12th	20th	(Romania) Sorin Colceag	22 November 2024
Bihor Oradea	(Argentina) Gustavo Aragolaza	Mutual agreement	4 November 2024	12th	16th	(Romania) Gheorghe Ghiț	4 November 2024
1599 Șelimbăr	(Romania) Constantin Schumacher	Sacked	13 November 2024	13th	17th	(Romania) Ioan Luca	13 November 2024
Focșani	(Romania) Sorin Colceag	Resigned	14 November 2024	13th	19th	(Romania) Alin Chița	19 November 2024
Voluntari	(Romania) Claudiu Niculescu	Sacked	22 November 2024	14th	9th	(Romania) Ovidiu Burcă	27 November 2024
Slatina	(Romania) Daniel Oprescu	Resigned	26 November 2024	14th	13th	(Romania) Claudiu Niculescu	29 November 2024
Voluntari	(Romania) Ovidiu Burcă	Sacked	30 December 2024	17th	5th	(Romania) Mihai Iosif	10 January 2025
Chindia Târgoviște	(Romania) Marian Vătavu	Sacked	28 January 2025	17th	14th	(Romania) Costel Pană	4 February 2025
Bihor Oradea	(Romania) Gheorghe Ghiț	Sacked	11 March 2025	20th	17th	(Romania) Erik Lincar	17 March 2025
Câmpulung Muscel	(Romania) Sorin Colceag	Sacked	16 March 2025	21st	20th	(Romania) Alecsandru Popovici	18 March 2025
Concordia Chiajna	(Romania) Liță Dumitru	Sacked	18 March 2025	21st	14th	(Romania) Nicolae Dică	19 March 2025
Voluntari	(Romania) Mihai Iosif	Sacked	25 April 2025	5th PO	6th	(Romania) Florian Pârvu	25 April 2025

== Regular season ==
=== League table ===
Pos	Team	Pld	W	D	L	GF	GA	GD	Pts	Promotion or relegation
1	Csíkszereda Miercurea Ciuc	19	14	2	3	37	17	+20	44	Advances to Promotion play-off
2	Steaua București	19	11	8	0	24	8	+16	41	Advances to Promotion play-off
3	Metaloglobus București	19	12	2	5	30	19	+11	38	Advances to Promotion play-off
4	Argeș Pitești	19	9	7	3	19	10	+9	34	Advances to Promotion play-off
5	Reșița	19	10	4	5	31	22	+9	34	Advances to Promotion play-off
6	Voluntari	19	9	6	4	27	16	+11	33	Advances to Promotion play-off
7	Corvinul Hunedoara	19	8	5	6	18	16	+2	29	Advances to Relegation play-out
8	Ceahlăul Piatra Neamț	19	7	6	6	22	22	0	27	Advances to Relegation play-out
9	FCU 1948 Craiova	19	7	6	6	21	21	0	27	Advances to Relegation play-out
10	Afumați	19	8	3	8	21	25	−4	27	Advances to Relegation play-out
11	Slatina	19	7	5	7	26	19	+7	26	Advances to Relegation play-out
12	Unirea Ungheni	19	7	5	7	19	20	−1	26	Advances to Relegation play-out
13	Metalul Buzău	19	6	5	8	18	20	−2	23	Advances to Relegation play-out
14	Concordia Chiajna	19	6	5	8	25	29	−4	23	Advances to Relegation play-out
15	Bihor Oradea	19	5	4	10	18	26	−8	19	Advances to Relegation play-out
16	Chindia Târgoviște	19	4	6	9	20	23	−3	18	Advances to Relegation play-out
17	1599 Șelimbăr	19	4	6	9	20	24	−4	18	Advances to Relegation play-out
18	Dumbrăvița	19	4	3	12	15	25	−10	15	Advances to Relegation play-out
19	Focșani	19	3	5	11	10	22	−12	14	Advances to Relegation play-out
20	Câmpulung Muscel	19	2	1	16	7	44	−37	7	Advances to Relegation play-out
21	Mioveni (Note: Mioveni was deducted 74 points due to unpaid debts. Subsequently, on 13 February 2025, it was excluded and all its results were canceled. At the time, it was ranked 21st with 2 wins, 2 draws, 12 losses, 6–39 goals, and −66 points (after the deduction).) (D)	0	0	0	0	0	0	0	0	Excluded
22	Viitorul Pandurii Târgu Jiu (Note: Viitorul Pandurii Târgu Jiu was excluded on 23 October 2024 after failing to attend two matches, while it was in insolvency. At the time, it was ranked 22nd with 0 wins, 1 draw, 8 losses, 3–27 goals, and 1 point. It subsequently went into bankruptcy.) (D)	0	0	0	0	0	0	0	0	Excluded

Source: FRF (in Romanian)
Rules for classification: During Season: 1) Points, 2) Goal difference, 3) Goals scored. End of Season: 1) Points, 2) Head-to-head points, 3) Head-to-head goal difference, 4) Goal difference, 5) Goals scored
(D) Disqualified or excluded

=== Results ===
Home \ Away	CSI	STE	MET	ARG	REȘ	VOL	COR	CEA	FCU	AFU	SLA	UNG	MBZ	CON	BIH	CHI	ȘEL	DUM	FOC	CMU
Csíkszereda Miercurea Ciuc			2–1					3–1	2–0	2–1	5–1		4–2				1–0	1–0	1–0	4–1
Steaua București	0–0			0–0	2–2	2–1	3–0		0–0			2–1		2–1		1–1			1–0	
Metaloglobus București		0–0		1–2	1–0	2–1			3–2		0–1	3–0			3–0	3–2				
Argeș Pitești	0–1					1–0	0–1					2–0	0–0	3–2		2–1		2–1	2–0	
Reșița	2–3			0–0		0–2	1–0		2–0			3–2		3–1		1–1		1–1	1–0	
Voluntari	2–1						2–0	2–1				1–3	1–1	1–1		4–1		1–0	0–0	3–0
Corvinul Hunedoara	1–1		0–1					1–1	0–0	2–0			0–1	1–1			1–0	0–0	3–2	3–0
Ceahlăul Piatra Neamț		1–1	0–1	0–0	0–2					3–0	0–3				1–1		3–2			
FCU 1948 Craiova				0–1		0–0		2–4		0–3		2–0	3–1			1–0	1–1			2–0
Afumați		0–4	2–1	1–1	3–2	0–1					1–2				1–2		1–0			
Slatina		1–1		0–0	4–0	1–1	1–0		1–2			0–1		1–2	0–0	0–0				
Unirea Ungheni	1–0						1–2	1–1		0–0			0–0	3–1		0–1		1–0	1–1	2–1
Metalul Buzău		0–1	2–2		0–2			2–0		1–0	1–0				1–2		2–0			0–1
Concordia Chiajna	2–1		2–3					0–2	0–2	2–4			1–0				2–2	0–0	1–0	1–0
Bihor Oradea	0–1	0–1		1–0	2–3	2–4	1–2		1–1			0–2		0–4		1–0				
Chindia Târgoviște	2–3						0–1	0–1		0–1			0–0	1–1			2–1	3–1	1–1	4–0
1599 Șelimbăr		0–1	3–1	0–0	0–3	0–0					2–1	0–0			1–1					
Dumbrăvița		0–1	0–2					1–2	1–2	0–1	2–4		3–1		1–0		2–3			1–0
Focșani			0–1					0–1	1–1	0–0	1–0		0–3		0–3		2–1	0–1		2–0
Câmpulung Muscel		0–1	0–3	1–3	0–3			0–0		1–2	0–5				2–1		0–4			

Source: FRF (in Romanian)
Legend: Blue = home team win; Yellow = draw; Red = away team win.

== Promotion play-off ==
A promotion play-off tournament between the best 6 teams (after 19 rounds) will be played to decide the two teams that will be promoted to Liga I, meanwhile the third-placed and fourth-placed teams would play another play-off match against the 13th-placed and 14th-placed teams from Liga I. The teams will start the promotion play-offs with all the points accumulated in the regular season.

=== Play-off table ===
Pos	Team	Pld	W	D	L	GF	GA	GD	Pts	Promotion or qualification
1	Argeș Pitești (C, P)	10	7	2	1	19	5	+14	57	Promotion to Liga I
2	Steaua București (Note: Steaua București is ineligible for promotion due to the club being owned by a governmental department/entity, while Liga I clubs are required to be privately owned.)	10	4	2	4	14	14	0	55	
3	Csíkszereda Miercurea Ciuc (P)	10	2	4	4	7	14	−7	54	Promotion to Liga I
4	Voluntari	10	3	5	2	10	7	+3	47	Qualification to play-offs
5	Metaloglobus București (O, P)	10	2	2	6	7	17	−10	46	Qualification to play-offs
6	Reșița	10	2	5	3	11	11	0	45	

Source: FRF
Rules for classification: 1) Points; 2) Points in the regular season; 3) Head-to-head points; 4) Head-to-head goal difference; 5) Head-to-head goals scored; 6) Head-to-head away goals scored; 7) Goal difference (regular season + play off); 8) Goals scored (regular season + play off); 9) Play-off.
(C) Champions; (O) Play-off winners; (P) Promoted

=== Play-off results ===
Home \ Away	ARG	CSI	MET	RES	STE	VOL
Argeș Pitești		3–0	1–0	3–0	4–2	0–0
Csíkszereda Miercurea Ciuc	0–4		2–3	1–1	0–0	2–0
Metaloglobus București	2–1	0–1		0–4	0–3	0–0
Reșița	0–1	1–1	1–1		0–2	1–1
Steaua București	1–2	0–0	3–1	0–2		3–2
Voluntari	0–0	2–0	1–0	1–1	3–0	

Source: FRF
Legend: Blue = home team win; Yellow = draw; Red = away team win.

== Promotion/relegation play-offs ==
The 13th and 14th-placed teams of the Liga I faces the 3rd and 4th-placed team of the Liga II.

Team 1	Agg.	Team 2	1st leg	2nd leg
Politehnica Iași	1–2	Metaloglobus București	1–1	0–1
Voluntari	2–2 (3–4 p)	Unirea Slobozia	2–1	0–1

First leg

25 May 2025	Politehnica Iași	1–1	Metaloglobus București	Iași
15:00 EEST (UTC+3)	Ștefanovici 12'	Report	Huiban 86'	Stadium: Emil Alexandrescu; Attendance: 2,332; Referee: István Kovács

26 May 2025	Voluntari	2–1	Unirea Slobozia	Voluntari
20:00 EEST (UTC+3)	Andreș 21'; Schieb 86'	Report	Vojtuš 32'	Stadium: Anghel Iordănescu; Attendance: 500; Referee: Marian Barbu

Second leg

1 June 2025	Metaloglobus București	1–0	Politehnica Iași	Clinceni
21:00 EEST (UTC+3)	Huiban 85'	Report		Stadium: Clinceni Stadium; Attendance: 500; Referee: Adrian Cojocaru

2 June 2025	Unirea Slobozia	1–0 (4–3 p)	Voluntari	Clinceni
20:00 EEST (UTC+3)	Arabuli 41'	Report		Stadium: Clinceni Stadium; Attendance: 2,401; Referee: Horațiu Feșnic
	Penalties
	Vojtuš (penalty missed); Arabuli (penalty scored); Perianu (penalty scored); Bărbuț (penalty scored); Toma (penalty scored)		Dumiter (penalty scored); Panțîru (penalty missed); Carnat (penalty missed); Crișan (penalty scored); Guțea (penalty scored)

== Relegation play-out ==
A relegation play-out tournament between the last 14 ranked teams at the end of the regular season decide the five teams that will be relegated to Liga III. Two play-out groups were made: the first group consisted of teams ranked 7, 10, 11, 14, 15, 18 and 19, and the second group consisted of teams ranked 8, 9, 12, 13, 16, 17 and 20, at the end of the regular season. The teams started the relegation play-out with all the points accumulated in the regular season. Two teams from each group were relegated to Liga III.

=== Group A ===
Pos	Team	Pld	W	D	L	GF	GA	GD	Pts	Qualification or relegation
1	Corvinul Hunedoara	6	5	0	1	16	5	+11	44	
2	Metalul Buzău	6	3	1	2	9	10	−1	33	
3	FCU 1948 Craiova	6	2	0	4	6	11	−5	33	
4	Bihor Oradea	6	4	1	1	14	8	+6	32	
5	Unirea Ungheni	6	1	1	4	4	13	−9	30	
6	Dumbrăvița (R)	6	2	1	3	5	5	0	22	Relegation to 2025–26 Liga III
7	Focșani (R)	6	1	2	3	6	8	−2	19	Relegation to 2025–26 Liga III

Source: FRF
Rules for classification: 1) Points; 2) Points in the regular season; 3) Head-to-head points; 4) Head-to-head goal difference; 5) Head-to-head goals scored; 6) Head-to-head away goals scored; 7) Goal difference (regular season + play out); 8) Goals scored (regular season + play out); 9) Play-off.
(R) Relegated

=== Group B ===
Pos	Team	Pld	W	D	L	GF	GA	GD	Pts	Qualification or relegation
1	Slatina	6	3	3	0	10	3	+7	38	
2	Ceahlăul Piatra Neamț	6	2	2	2	10	9	+1	35	
3	1599 Șelimbăr	6	4	1	1	13	6	+7	31	
4	Afumați	6	1	1	4	5	12	−7	31	
5	Concordia Chiajna	6	2	1	3	9	11	−2	30	
6	Chindia Târgoviște (O)	6	2	3	1	10	8	+2	27	Qualification to relegation play-offs
7	Câmpulung Muscel (R)	6	1	1	4	8	16	−8	11	Relegation to 2025–26 Liga III

Source: FRF
Rules for classification: 1) Points; 2) Points in the regular season; 3) Head-to-head points; 4) Head-to-head goal difference; 5) Head-to-head goals scored; 6) Head-to-head away goals scored; 7) Goal difference (regular season + play out); 8) Goals scored (regular season + play out); 9) Play-off.
(O) Play-off winners; (R) Relegated

== Liga II play-out ==
The 6th-placed teams of the Liga II relegation play-out groups faced each other in order to determine the last relegated team to Liga III.

Team 1	Agg.	Team 2	1st leg	2nd leg
Dumbrăvița	2–4	Chindia Târgoviște	0–1	2–3

=== Matches ===
17 May 2025 First leg	Dumbrăvița	0–1	Chindia Târgoviște	Dumbrăvița
11:00 EEST (UTC+3)	Cibi (yellow card) 57'; Gladun (yellow card) 58'; Paulevici (yellow card) 70' (yellow card) 90+8' (yellow-red card)	Report	Leca (yellow card) 52'; Florea 26' (pen.) (yellow card) 68'; Ioniță (yellow card) 70'	Stadium: Ștefan Dobay Stadium; Attendance: 500; Referee: George Găman

24 May 2025 Second leg	Chindia Târgoviște	3–2 (4–2 agg.)	Dumbrăvița	Târgoviște
11:00 EEST (UTC+3)	Ioniță (yellow card) 53'; Florea 49' (yellow card) 80'; Tache 79'; Petre (yellow card) 82'; Cocoș 87' (yellow card) 90+1'	Report	Gladun 15'; Pădurariu 21'; Buțu (yellow card) 48'; Zurbagiu (yellow card) 57'	Stadium: Eugen Popescu Stadium; Attendance: 1,000; Referee: Radu Petrescu

== Season statistics ==
Regular season, promotion play-off and relegation play-out overall statistics

As of 18 May 2025

=== Top scorers ===
Rank	Player	Club	Regular	Play-off	Play-out	Total
1	(Romania) Bogdan Chipirliu	Steaua București	11	4	0	15
1	(Croatia) Matko Babić	1599 Șelimbăr	8	0	7	15
2	(Slovakia) Jozef Dolný	Csíkszereda Miercurea Ciuc	11	2	0	13
3	(Moldova) Alexandru Boiciuc	Concordia Chiajna	11	0	1	12
4	(Romania) Valentin Robu	Metalul Buzău	8	0	2	10
4	(Ghana) Carl Davordzie	Ceahlăul Piatra Neamț	6	0	4	10
5	(Romania) Cătălin Doman	Slatina	9	0	0	9
5	(Romania) Dragoș Huiban	Metaloglobus București	8	1	0	9
5	(Mali) Moussa Samaké	Reșița	7	2	0	9
6	(Romania) Robert Moldoveanu	Argeș Pitești	3	5	0	8
7	(Romania) Giovani Ghimfuș	Concordia Chiajna	7	0	0	7
7	(Spain) Nacho Heras	Steaua București	4	3	0	7
7	(Romania) Patrick Petre	Ceahlăul Piatra Neamț	7	0	0	7
7	(Romania) Florian Haită	Reșița	6	1	0	7
7	(Romania) Nicolae Carnat	Voluntari	6	1	0	7
7	(Slovakia) Adam Nemec	Voluntari	5	2	0	7
7	(Romania) Nicu Modan	Dumbrăvița	6	0	1	7
7	(Romania) Iulian Roșu	Chindia Târgoviște	3	0	4	7

=== Hat-tricks ===
As of 18 May 2025

Player	For	Against	Result	Date	Round
(Romania) Bogdan Chipirliu	Afumați	Steaua București	0–4 (A)	14 December 2024	17 (Regular season)
(Croatia) Matko Babić	1599 Șelimbăr	Afumați	3–0 (H)	10 May 2025	7 (Play-out)
