= ACS FC Bacău =

Romanian football club

FC Bacău
- Full name: Asociația Club Sportiv; Fotbal Club Bacău
- Nicknames: Băcăuanii (The People from Bacău County); Alb-roșii (The White and Reds)
- Short name: Bacău
- Founded: 2014; 12 years ago
- Ground: Ruși-Ciutea
- Capacity: 700
- Owners: Adrian Pavăl (50%); Dragoș Pavăl (50%)
- Chairman: Cristian Ciocoiu
- Head coach: Costel Enache
- League: Liga II
- 2025–26: Liga II, 10th of 22
- Website: https://fcbacau.ro/
Home colours	Away colours

Asociația Club Sportiv Fotbal Club Bacău, commonly known as FC Bacău, or simply as Bacău, is a Romanian football club based in Bacău, Bacău County. The club was established in 2014 as a youth academy and currently competes in Liga II, the second tier of Romanian football.

== History ==
The club was established in 2014 as a youth academy at the initiative of former FCM Bacău player Cristian Ciocoiu. The project also involved brothers Adrian and Dragoș Pavăl, the owners of Dedeman, one of Romania's largest home improvement retailers.

In 2022, Academia FC Bacău merged through absorption with Dinamo Bacău, which had earned promotion to Liga III in 2021, and took over its place in the third tier. Costel Enache was appointed head coach of the senior side and oversaw the club's development in Liga III.

In the 2023–24 season, FC Bacău finished second in Series I and qualified for the promotion play-offs. In the semi-final, the Bacău side defeated Metalul Buzău 1–0 at home in the first leg, but lost the return match 0–1. With the aggregate score level at 1–1, Metalul prevailed 4–3 in the penalty shoot-out, eliminating FC Bacău from the promotion race.

The 2024–25 season brought the club's breakthrough. FC Bacău won Series I, recording only two defeats and two draws in the 18-match regular season, before dominating the play-off phase with seven victories. The club advanced automatically through the first promotion play-off round after Sporting Liești was denied the right to participate, and then faced Unirea Braniștea in the decisive tie. FC Bacău won the first leg 3–1 at home through goals from Alexandru Aftanache, Codrin Oasenegre and Georgian Albu, before winning the return match 3–2 away and securing promotion to Liga II with a 6–3 aggregate victory. It was the first promotion to the second tier in the club's history.

FC Bacău made its Liga II debut in the 2025–26 season and was placed in Play-out Group B after the regular season. The club secured its place in the division, recording wins including 1–0 against CS Tunari, 3–1 against CS Afumați and 1–0 against CSC Dumbrăvița. In the 2025–26 Cupa României, FC Bacău defeated CSM Vaslui in the second round but was eliminated 0–2 at home by Ceahlăul Piatra Neamț in the third round.

The academy also recorded an important achievement at youth level during the same season, winning the 2025–26 Romanian Youth Cup after defeating Petrolul Ploiești 1–0 in the final, with Denis Tînjală scoring the winning goal.

Having retained its second-tier status, FC Bacău continued in Liga II for the 2026–27 season. The Romanian Football Federation listed ACS FC Bacău among the fourteen clubs continuing from the previous campaign, with the 22-team season beginning on 1 August 2026.

== Ground ==
FC Bacău plays its home matches at Ruși-Ciutea Stadium, a multi-use stadium in Bacău. The stadium has an artificial turf pitch. It holds 700 people on seats.

== Honours ==
Liga III

- Winners (1): 2024–25
- Runners-up (1): 2023–24

== Players ==
=== First team squad ===
As of 13 October 2026

Note: Flags indicate national team as defined under FIFA eligibility rules; some limited exceptions apply. Players may hold more than one non-FIFA nationality.

No.	Pos.	Nation	Player
1	GK	ROU	Lucian Anton
4	DF	ESP	Carlos Inglada
5	DF	ROU	Luca Agapi
6	DF	ROU	Bogdan Forizs
7	MF	ROU	Paul Mitrică
8	MF	ROU	Georgian Albu
9	FW	ROU	Daniele Luncașu
10	MF	ROU	Gabriel Cîrstean (Vice-captain)
11	FW	ROU	Alexandru Gîrbiță
12	GK	MDA	Maxim Gumenco
13	DF	ROU	Mario Bordea
14	DF	ROU	Abel Coajă (3rd captain)

No.	Pos.	Nation	Player
15	MF	ROU	Tudor Axinte
16	DF	ROU	David Banu
17	DF	ROU	Federico Baciu
18	MF	ROU	Codrin Oasenegre
19	DF	ROU	Diego Burlacu
21	FW	ROU	Robert Ciobanu
22	FW	ROU	Andrei Pavel (Captain)
23	DF	CRO	Marko Jurić
24	MF	ROU	Patrick Petre
27	MF	ROU	Romario Moise
29	MF	POR	Tomás Lacerda
30	GK	ITA	Edoardo Alloj

== Club officials ==
=== Board of directors ===
Role	Name
Owners	(Romania) Adrian Pavăl (50%) (Romania) Dragoș Pavăl (50%)
President	(Romania) Cristian Ciocoiu
Head of Youth Center	(Romania) Gheorghe Poenaru
Technical director	(Romania) Vladimir Jăpălău
Sporting Director	(Romania) Flavius Măstăcăneanu
Chief of Scouting	(Romania) Toader Șteț
Team manager	(Romania) Mihăiță Lungu
Press Officer	(Romania) Victor Mihai

=== Current technical staff ===
Role	Name
Head coach	(Romania) Costel Enache
Assistant coach	(Romania) Andrei Dumitraș
Goalkeeping coach	(Romania) Vasile Curileac
Fitness coach	(Romania) Andrei Dumitraș
Kinetotherapist	(Romania) Andrei Arseni
Kit Man	(Romania) Florin Metanie

== League and Cup history ==
Season	Tier	Division	Place	Notes	Cupa României
2026–27	2	Liga II	TBD		TBD
2025–26	2	Liga II	9th		Third round
2024–25	3	Liga III (Seria I)	1st (C)	Promoted	Third round
2023–24	3	Liga III (Seria I)	2nd		Play-off round
