= Ianis Doană =

Romanian footballer (born 2007)

Personal information
- Full name: Ianis Fabian Doană
- Date of birth: 12 October 2007 (age 19)
- Place of birth: Reșița, Romania
- Height: 1.83 m (6 ft 0 in)
- Position: Midfielder

Team information
- Current team: Politehnica Timișoara
- Number: 24

Youth career
- –2024: CSM Reșița

Senior career*
| Years | Team | Apps | (Gls) |
| 2024–2026 | CSM Reșița | 31 | (2) |
| 2025–2026 | → CSA Steaua București (loan) | 24 | (3) |
| 2026 | Dinamo București | 0 | (0) |
| 2026– | Politehnica Timișoara | 10 | (6) |

International career^{‡}
| 2025 | Romania U18 | 4 | (0) |
| 2025–2026 | Romania U19 | 3 | (0) |
- * Club domestic league appearances and goals as of 31 October 2026 ‡ National team caps and goals as of 12 June 2026

Ianis Fabian Doană (born 12 October 2007) is a Romanian professional footballer who plays as a midfielder for Liga II club Politehnica Timișoara.

== Career statistics ==
As of 31 October 2026

Appearances and goals by club, season and competition
| Club | Season | League | | | Cupa României | | Europe | | Other | | Total | |
| Club | Season | Division | Apps | Goals | Apps | Goals | Apps | Goals | Apps | Goals | Apps | Goals |
|---|---|---|---|---|---|---|---|---|---|---|---|---|
| CSM Reșița | 2023–24 | Liga II | 7 | 0 | — | | — | | — | | 7 | 0 |
| CSM Reșița | 2024–25 | Liga II | 24 | 2 | 4 | 0 | — | | — | | 28 | 2 |
| CSM Reșița | Total | | 31 | 2 | 4 | 0 | — | | — | | 35 | 2 |
| CSA Steaua București (loan) | 2025–26 | Liga II | 24 | 3 | 1 | 0 | — | | — | | 25 | 3 |
| Politehnica Timișoara | 2026–27 | Liga II | 10 | 6 | 0 | 0 | — | | — | | 10 | 6 |
| Career total | | | 65 | 11 | 5 | 0 | — | | — | | 70 | 11 |

== Personal life ==
Ianis' father, Leontin, was also a footballer, having played several seasons for CSM Reșița.
