= Mădălin Smaranda =

Romanian footballer

Personal information
- Full name: Mădălin George Smaranda
- Date of birth: 5 September 1984 (age 42)
- Place of birth: Slatina, Romania
- Height: 1.84 m (6 ft 0 in)
- Position: Goalkeeper

Team information
- Current team: Politehnica Timișoara (GK coach)

Youth career
- 1996–2004: UM Timișoara

Senior career*
Years	Team	Apps	(Gls)
2004–2008	UM Timișoara		
2008–2010	Fortuna Covaci	23	(0)
2010–2012	UTA Arad	40	(0)
2013–2014	Bihor Oradea	23	(0)
2014–2018	ACS Poli Timișoara	29	(0)
2019–2021	Dumbrăvița	1	(0)
Total		116	(0)

Managerial career
- 2019–2021: Dumbrăvița (player/GK coach)
- 2021: ASU Politehnica Timișoara U19 (GK coach)
- 2021–2022: ASU Politehnica Timișoara (GK coach)
- 2023–: Politehnica Timișoara (GK coach)
- * Club domestic league appearances and goals

Mădălin George Smaranda (born 5 September 1984) is a Romanian former professional football player, who played as a goalkeeper, currently goalkeeping coach at Liga II club Politehnica Timișoara.

== Honours ==
Fortuna Covaci

- Liga III: 2008–09

ACS Poli Timișoara

- Liga II: 2014–15
