= Luca Mihai =

Romanian professional footballer

Personal information
- Full name: Luca Alessandro Mihai
- Date of birth: 11 October 2003 (age 23)
- Place of birth: Bucharest, Romania
- Height: 1.85 m (6 ft 1 in)
- Position: Central midfielder

Team information
- Current team: Radnik Bijeljina
- Number: 88

Youth career
- –2017: Karlsruher SC
- 2017–2019: Walldorf
- 2019–2021: Chievo
- 2021–2022: Bologna
- 2022: SPAL

Senior career*
Years	Team	Apps	(Gls)
2022–2023	SPAL	0	(0)
2022–2023	→ Trento (loan)	15	(0)
2023	→ AlbinoLeffe (loan)	1	(0)
2023–2025	CFR Cluj	7	(0)
2024	→ Politehnica Iași (loan)	12	(0)
2025	→ Gloria Buzău (loan)	18	(0)
2025–2026	UTA Arad	15	(1)
2026	Catania	0	(0)
2026–	Radnik Bijeljina	2	(0)

International career
2022	Romania U19	2	(0)
2022–2023	Romania U20	3	(0)
2023–2024	Romania U21	1	(0)
- * Club domestic league appearances and goals as of 31 October 2026

Luca Alessandro Mihai (born 11 October 2003) is a Romanian professional footballer who plays as a central midfielder for Bosnian Premier League club Radnik Bijeljina.

== Career ==
He made his senior debut for Trento on 3 September 2022, in a 2–0 Serie C loss over Juventus U23.

On 31 January 2023, Mihai moved on loan to AlbinoLeffe, with an option to buy.

On 16 April 2024, while playing an away match for Poli Iasi, Mihai sustained multiple head injuries following a collision with Dinamo player Josué Homawoo. He was taken to hospital by ambulance where he had to overgo CT scans.

== Career statistics ==
As of match played 31 October 2026

Appearances and goals by club, season and competition
Club	Season	League			National cup (Note: Includes Coppa Italia Serie C, Romanian Cup, Bosnian Cup)		Total	
Club	Season	Division	Apps	Goals	Apps	Goals	Apps	Goals
Trento (loan)	2022–23	Serie C	15	0	1	0	16	0
AlbinoLeffe (loan)	2022–23	Serie C	1	0	—		1	0
CFR Cluj	2023–24	Liga I	7	0	—		7	0
Politehnica Iași (loan)	2023–24	Liga I	10	0	—		10	0
Politehnica Iași (loan)	2024–25	Liga I	2	0	1	0	3	0
Politehnica Iași (loan)	Total		12	0	1	0	13	0
Gloria Buzău (loan)	2024–25	Liga I	18	0	—		18	0
UTA Arad	2025–26	Liga I	15	1	2	0	17	1
Radnik Bijeljina	2026–27	Bosnian Premier League	2	0	1	0	3	0
Career total			70	1	5	0	75	1
