= Paul Mercioiu =

Romanian professional footballer

Personal information
- Full name: Paul Marcel Mercioiu
- Date of birth: 19 September 2003 (age 23)
- Place of birth: Arad, Romania
- Height: 1.82 m (6 ft 0 in)
- Position: Centre forward

Youth career
- –2021: UTA Arad

Senior career*
Years	Team	Apps	(Gls)
2021–2024	UTA Arad	7	(0)
2022–2023	→ Corvinul Hunedoara (loan)	9	(3)
2023	→ Dumbrăvița (loan)	2	(0)
2024	→ ACS Socodor (loan)		
2024–2025	Gloria LT Cermei		
- * Club domestic league appearances and goals as of 22:39, 26 August 2025 (UTC)

Paul Marcel Mercioiu (born 19 September 2003) is a Romanian professional footballer who plays as a forward.

== Club career ==
=== UTA Arad ===
He made his Liga I debut for UTA Arad against CFR Cluj on 26 September 2021.

== Career statistics ==
As of match played 24 November 2023

Appearances and goals by club, season and competition
Club	Season	League			Cupa României		Europe		Other		Total	
Club	Season	Division	Apps	Goals	Apps	Goals	Apps	Goals	Apps	Goals	Apps	Goals
UTA Arad	2021–22	Liga I	7	0	1	0	—		—		8	0
Corvinul Hunedoara (loan)	2022–23	Liga III	9	3	0	0	—		0	0	9	3
Dumbrăvița (loan)	2023–24	Liga II	2	0	2	0	—		—		4	0
Career total			18	3	3	0	0	0	0	0	21	3
