= David Popa =

Romanian footballer

Personal information
- Date of birth: 9 December 1997 (age 28)
- Place of birth: Aiud, Romania
- Height: 1.90 m (6 ft 3 in)
- Position: Forward

Team information
- Current team: Politehnica Timișoara
- Number: 8

Youth career
- 2006: Metalul Aiud
- 2007–2014: Atletico Arad
- 2013–2014: → UTA Arad (loan)
- 2014–2018: Birmingham City
- 2016: → Kettering Town (loan)

Senior career*
| Years | Team | Apps | (Gls) |
| 2018–2019 | UTA Arad | 33 | (8) |
| 2019–2020 | Kajaani | 29 | (9) |
| 2021 | Oulu | 1 | (0) |
| 2021 | OLS | 6 | (2) |
| 2021–2022 | Gloria Lunca-Teuz Cermei | 10 | (6) |
| 2022 | → Dumbrăvița (loan) | 8 | (0) |
| 2023 | Crișul Chișineu-Criș | 12 | (5) |
| 2023– | Politehnica Timișoara | 53 | (26) |

International career
| 2015–2016 | Romania U19 | 1 | (0) |
- * Club domestic league appearances and goals as of 24 October 2026

David Popa (born 9 December 1997) is a Romanian professional footballer who plays as a forward for Liga II club Politehnica Timișoara.

== Honours ==
ASU Politehnica Timișoara

- Liga III: 2025–26
