= Fabiano Cibi =

Romanian professional footballer

Personal information
- Full name: Fabiano Duarte Cibi
- Date of birth: 22 March 2005 (age 21)
- Place of birth: Santarém, Portugal
- Height: 1.86 m (6 ft 1 in)
- Position: Defensive midfielder

Team information
- Current team: Dumbrăvița
- Number: 3

Youth career
- –2022: LPS Banatul Timișoara

Senior career*
Years	Team	Apps	(Gls)
2022–2026	UTA Arad	2	(0)
2023–2026	→ Dumbrăvița (loan)	61	(3)
2026–	Dumbrăvița	8	(1)

International career^{‡}
2019	Romania U15	6	(0)
2020–2021	Romania U16	6	(0)
2021–2022	Romania U17	8	(1)
2022–2023	Romania U18	10	(0)
2023	Romania U19	5	(0)
2025	Romania U20	1	(0)
- * Club domestic league appearances and goals as of 31 October 2026 ‡ National team caps and goals as of 13 October 2025

Fabiano Duarte Cibi (born 22 March 2005) is a Romanian professional footballer who plays as a defensive midfielder for Liga II club Dumbrăvița.

== Club career ==
=== UTA Arad ===
He made his Liga I debut for UTA Arad against Academica Clinceni on 11 March 2022.

== Career statistics ==
As of match played 31 October 2026

Appearances and goals by club, season and competition
Club	Season	League			Cupa României		Europe		Other		Total	
Club	Season	Division	Apps	Goals	Apps	Goals	Apps	Goals	Apps	Goals	Apps	Goals
UTA Arad	2021–22	Liga I	1	0	—		—		—		1	0
UTA Arad	2022–23	Liga I	1	0	2	0	—		—		3	0
UTA Arad	Total		2	0	2	0	—		—		4	0
Dumbrăvița (loan)	2023–24	Liga II	14	1	2	0	—		—		16	1
Dumbrăvița (loan)	2024–25	Liga II	25	2	3	0	—		2 (Note: Appearance in Liga II relegation play-outs)	0	30	2
Dumbrăvița (loan)	2025–26	Liga II	22	0	5	0	—		—		27	0
Dumbrăvița	2026–27	Liga II	8	1	0	0	—		—		8	1
Dumbrăvița	Total		69	4	10	0	—		2	0	81	4
Career total			71	4	12	0	—		2	0	85	4
