= Kevin Appiah Nyarko =

Dutch footballer (born 2002)

Kevin Nyarko
Personal information
- Full name: Kevin Appiah Nyarko
- Date of birth: 18 February 2002 (age 24)
- Place of birth: Cologne, Germany
- Height: 1.85 m (6 ft 1 in)
- Position: Forward

Team information
- Current team: Politehnica Timișoara
- Number: 14

Youth career
- Fortuna Köln
- Wolverhampton Wanderers

Senior career*
Years	Team	Apps	(Gls)
2020	Hanworth Villa		
2020	Kingstonian		
2021–2022	Gottne	43	(28)
2023–2024	Brage	31	(5)
2024–2025	Varberg BoIS	31	(8)
2025	SJK	9	(3)
2026	Helsingborg	18	(3)
2026–	Politehnica Timișoara	6	(2)
- * Club domestic league appearances and goals as of 31 October 2026

Kevin Appiah Nyarko (born 18 February 2002) is a Dutch professional footballer who plays as a forward for Liga II club Politehnica Timișoara.

== Career ==
Appiah Nyarko was born in Germany and raised in the Netherlands. He is of Ghanaian descent.

After playing in Sweden since 2021, he moved to Finland in August 2025 and signed with Veikkausliiga club SJK Seinäjoki. He scored in his debut on 25 August, the winning goal in a 3–2 away win against Haka.

On 11 March 2026, he agreed to join Swedish club Helsingborgs IF on a one-year contract.
