= 2024–25 AFC Unirea Slobozia season =

AFC Unirea Slobozia
2024–25 season
- Manager: Adrian Mihalcea
- Stadium: Clinceni Stadium
- Liga I: 6th
- Cupa României: Pre-season
- Average home league attendance: 902
Home colours	Away colours	Third colours

The 2024–25 season is the 21st season in the history of AFC Unirea Slobozia. In addition to the domestic league, the team is scheduled to participate in the Cupa României.

== Transfers ==
=== In ===
Pos.	Player	Transferred to	Fee	Date	Source
MF	(Croatia) Adnan Aganović	(Romania) Sepsi OSK	Free	6 July 2024	
FW	(Guinea) Sekou Camara	(Romania) Botoșani	Free	7 July 2024	

== Friendlies ==
=== Pre-season ===
20 June 2024 Friendly	Sepsi OSK (Romania)	1–1	(Romania) Unirea Slobozia	Simeria
11:00 UTC+3				Stadium: Stadionul Sportiv

22 June 2024 Friendly	Dinamo București (Romania)	1–1	(Romania) Unirea Slobozia	Ghimbav
11:00 UTC+3				Stadium: Baza Sportivă Campo Verde

== Competitions ==
=== Overall record ===
Competition	First match	Last match	Starting round	Record							
Competition	First match	Last match	Starting round	Pld	W	D	L	GF	GA	GD	Win %
Liga I	12 July 2024		Matchday 1	5	1	2	2	4	7	−3	20.00
Cupa României				0	0	0	0	0	0	+0	—
Total				5	1	2	2	4	7	−3	20.00

Last updated: 11 August 2024
Source: Soccerway

=== Liga I ===
==== League table ====
Pos	Team	Pld	W	D	L	GF	GA	GD	Pts	Advances
12	Oțelul Galați	30	7	11	12	24	32	−8	32	Qualification for play-out round
13	Politehnica Iași	30	8	7	15	29	46	−17	31 (Note: Ranked on head-to-head points: Politehnica Iași (4); Botoșani (1).)	Qualification for play-out round
14	Botoșani	30	7	10	13	26	37	−11	31	Qualification for play-out round
15	Unirea Slobozia	30	7	5	18	28	47	−19	26	Qualification for play-out round
16	Gloria Buzău	30	5	5	20	25	51	−26	20	Qualification for play-out round

Source: LPF (in Romanian)
Rules for classification: 1) Points; 2) Head-to-head points; 3) Head-to-head goal difference; 4) Head-to-head goals scored; 5) Goal difference; 6) Goals scored; 7) Play-off.

==== Results summary ====
Overall								Home						Away					
Pld	W	D	L	GF	GA	GD	Pts	W	D	L	GF	GA	GD	W	D	L	GF	GA	GD
5	1	2	2	4	7	−3	5	0	1	1	2	3	−1	1	1	1	2	4	−2

Last updated: 11 August 2024.

==== Results by round ====
Round	1	2	3	4	5
Ground	A	H	A	H	A
Result	W	D	D	L	L
Position	3	5	5	6	

Updated to match(es) played on 11 August 2024. Source:
A = Away; H = Home; W = Win; D = Draw; L = Loss

==== Matches ====
The match schedule was released on 1 July 2024.

12 July 2024 1	Farul Constanța	0–1	Unirea Slobozia	Constanța
18:30 UTC+3	Rivaldinho (yellow card) 17'; Vînă (yellow card) 43'		Purece 19'; Perianu (yellow card) 21'; Camara (yellow card) 64'; Toma (yellow card) 90+4'	Stadium: Central Stadium; Referee: Andrei Moroiță

19 July 2024 2	Unirea Slobozia	2–2	FCSB	Clinceni
22:00 UTC+3	Ilie 36'; Purece (yellow card) 49'; Rusu (yellow card) 64'; Dorobanțu 89'; López Varela (yellow card) 90+1'		Lixandru 33'; Dawa (yellow card) 48'; Olaru 55' (pen.)	Stadium: Clinceni Stadium; Referee: Vlad Baban

26 July 2024 3	Hermannstadt	1–1	Unirea Slobozia	Sibiu
19:00 UTC+3	Murgia 6'; Ivanov (yellow card) 9'; Biceanu (yellow card) 58'; Neguț (yellow card) 67'; Oroian (yellow card) 90'		Pospelov 40'; Aganović (yellow card) 67'; Medina (yellow card) 72'; Bărbuț (yellow card) 90+4'	Stadium: Sibiu Municipal Stadium; Referee: Rareş George Vidican

5 August 2024 4	Unirea Slobozia	0–1	UTA Arad	Clinceni
19:00 UTC+3			Costache 73'	Stadium: Clinceni Stadium; Referee: Iulian Călin

11 August 2024 5	CFR Cluj	3–0	Unirea Slobozia	Cluj-Napoca
22:00 UTC+3	Munteanu 38', 63'; Păun 52'			Stadium: Dr. Constantin Rădulescu Stadium; Referee: Andrei Chivulete
