= Vasile Curileac =

Romanian professional footballer

Personal information
- Full name: Vasile Marius Curileac
- Date of birth: 18 February 1984 (age 42)
- Place of birth: Satu Mare, Romania
- Height: 1.90 m (6 ft 3 in)
- Position: Goalkeeper

Team information
- Current team: FC Bacău (GK coach)

Youth career
- –2004: Samobil Satu Mare

Senior career*
Years	Team	Apps	(Gls)
2004–2006	Unirea Dej	14	(0)
2006–2008	Cetatea Suceava	10	(0)
2008–2009	Unirea Alba Iulia	2	(0)
2009	FC Snagov	13	(0)
2010–2011	Arieșul Turda	2	(0)
2011–2015	Botoșani	71	(0)
2015–2016	Concordia Chiajna	0	(0)
2016–2018	ACS Poli Timișoara	24	(0)
2019–2020	CSM Satu Mare	5	(0)
2021–2022	Dante Botoșani	0	(0)
2022–2023	Viitorul Darabani	9	(0)
2023–2024	Nord Păltiniș	0	(0)
Total		150	(0)

Managerial career
- 2022: Dante Botoșani (player/GK coach)
- 2022–2023: Viitorul Darabani (player/GK coach)
- 2023–2024: Nord Păltiniș (player/coach)
- 2024–: FC Bacău (GK coach)
- * Club domestic league appearances and goals

Vasile Marius Curileac (born 18 February 1984) is a Romanian former professional footballer who played as a goalkeeper, currently goalkeeping coach at Liga II club FC Bacău.

== Honours ==
Cetatea Suceava

- Liga III: 2007–08

Unirea Alba Iulia

- Liga II: 2008–09

Botoșani

- Liga II: 2012–13

Concordia Chiajna

- Cupa Ligii runner-up: 2015–16

ACS Poli Timișoara

- Cupa Ligii runner-up: 2016–17

CSM Satu Mare

- Liga IV – Satu Mare County: 2018–19, 2019–20

Dante Botoșani

- Liga III: 2021–22
