= Andrei Dumitraș =

Romanian footballer

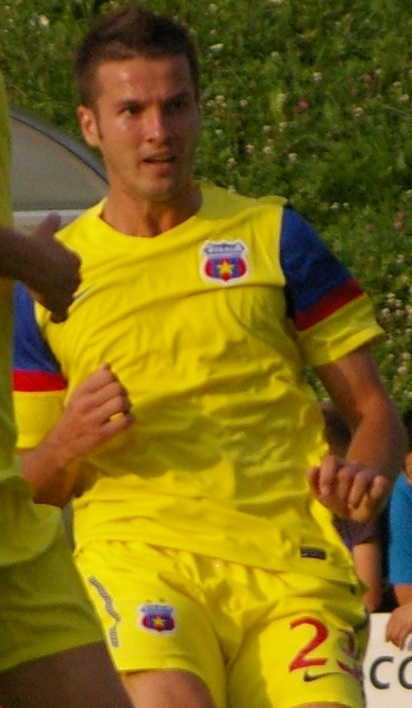
- Dumitraș in a game for Steaua

Personal information
- Full name: Andrei Ioan Dumitraș
- Date of birth: 23 January 1988 (age 38)
- Place of birth: Pomârla, Romania
- Height: 1.85 m (6 ft 1 in)
- Position: Defender

Team information
- Current team: FC Bacău (assistant/fitness coach)

Youth career
- 1993–2003: Nord Star Pomârla
- 2003–2005: LPS Roman

Senior career*
Years	Team	Apps	(Gls)
2005–2009	Laminorul Roman	85	(0)
2010–2012	Ceahlăul Piatra Neamț	62	(1)
2012	Steaua București	5	(0)
2013–2014	Ceahlăul Piatra Neamț	54	(2)
2015–2017	Universitatea Craiova	41	(1)
2017	Viitorul Constanța	1	(0)
2017–2019	Botoșani	36	(1)
2019	Concordia Chiajna	13	(0)
2020–2021	CSM Reșița	22	(0)
2021–2022	Dante Botoșani	20	(1)
2022–2023	Bucovina Rădăuți	26	(1)
Total		365	(7)

International career
2015	Romania	1	(0)

Managerial career
- 2021–2022: Dante Botoșani (player/fitness coach)
- 2022–2023: Bucovina Rădăuți (player/fitness coach)
- 2023–: FC Bacău (assistant/fitness coach)
- * Club domestic league appearances and goals

Andrei Ioan Dumitraș (born 23 January 1988) is a Romanian former professional footballer who played as a defender, currently assistant coach and fitness coach at Liga II club FC Bacău.

== Club career ==
Dumitraș started his football career in 2005, playing for Laminorul Roman in the Romanian Liga II. After that, he moved to Ceahlăul Piatra Neamţ.

=== Ceahlăul Piatra Neamț ===
In January 2010, Dumitraş was sold to Ceahlăul Piatra Neamţ. Here became an important player, and in second part of 2011–12 season, he was named captain of the team.

=== Steaua București ===
On 22 May 2012, he signed a 5-year contract with Steaua București who paid €350,000 for his services. He made his debut for the club on 23 July 2012, in a 1–0 win with Concordia Chiajna. On 30 August 2012, he scored one goal for Steaua in a 3-0 victory against FK Ekranas, in UEFA Europa League 2012-13 qualifiers.

On 19 December 2012, Dumitraș signed a 5-year deal with his former club, Ceahlăul Piatra Neamț. In January 2015, Dumitraș was transferred to Universitatea Craiova for an undisclosed fee.

== Honours ==
Ceahlăul Piatra Neamț

- Liga II: 2010–11

Viitorul Constanța

- Supercupa României runner-up: 2017

Dante Botoșani

- Liga III: 2021–22
