= Guilherme Soares =

Portuguese footballer

Guilherme
Personal information
- Full name: Guilherme Araújo Soares
- Date of birth: 8 February 2001 (age 25)
- Place of birth: Braga, Portugal
- Height: 1.86 m (6 ft 1 in)
- Position: Centre-back

Team information
- Current team: Lusitânia
- Number: 42

Youth career
- 2008–2021: Braga
- 2014–2015: → Palmeiras Braga (loan)

Senior career*
Years	Team	Apps	(Gls)
2021–2024	Braga B	53	(2)
2021–2024	Braga	2	(0)
2023–2024	→ Oliveirense (loan)	26	(1)
2024–2025	Politehnica Iași	33	(3)
2025–2026	Petrolul Ploiești	11	(0)
2026–	Lusitânia	1	(0)
- * Club domestic league appearances and goals as of 16 August 2026

Guilherme Araújo Soares (born 8 February 2001), known as Guilherme, is a Portuguese professional footballer who plays as a centre-back for Liga Portugal 2 club Lusitânia.

== Professional career ==
A youth product of Braga since 2010, Soares was called up to their first team in 2021. He made his professional debut for Braga as a starter in a 0–0 Primeira Liga tie with Portimonense on 19 May 2021. He was assigned to their B-team for the 2021–22 season, where he scored one goal in 23 appearances. He signed a professional contract with Braga on 1 February 2022 until 2025.

On 8 August 2023, Braga sent Soares on a season-long loan to Liga Portugal 2 club Oliveirense.

== Career statistics ==
As of match played 16 August 2026

Appearances and goals by club, season and competition
Club	Season	League			National cup (Note: Includes Taça de Portugal, Cupa României)		League cup		Europe		Other		Total	
Club	Season	Division	Apps	Goals	Apps	Goals	Apps	Goals	Apps	Goals	Apps	Goals	Apps	Goals
Braga	2020–21	Primeira Liga	1	0	0	0	0	0	0	0	—		1	0
Braga	2021–22	Primeira Liga	1	0	0	0	0	0	0	0	—		1	0
Braga	Total		2	0	0	0	0	0	0	0	0	0	2	0
Braga B	2021–22	Liga 3	23	1	—		—		—		—		23	1
Braga B	2022–23	Liga 3	30	1	—		—		—		2 (Note: Appearances in relegation play-offs)	0	32	1
Braga B	Total		53	2	—		—		—		—		53	2
Oliveirense (loan)	2023–24	Liga Portugal 2	26	1	2	0	0	0	—		—		28	1
Politehnica Iași	2024–25	Liga I	33	3	2	0	—		—		—		35	3
Petrolul Ploiești	2025–26	Liga I	11	0	3	0	—		—		—		14	0
Lusitânia	2026–27	Liga Portugal 2	1	0	0	0	—		—		—		1	0
Career total			126	6	7	0	0	0	0	0	2	0	135	6
