= Sekou Camara (footballer, born 1997) =

Guinean footballer

Personal information
- Date of birth: 20 July 1997 (age 29)
- Place of birth: Conakry, Guinea
- Height: 1.83 m (6 ft 0 in)
- Position: Forward

Team information
- Current team: Chindia Târgoviște
- Number: 21

Senior career*
Years	Team	Apps	(Gls)
2015–2016	Luzi i Vogël		
2016–2020	Besëlidhja Lezhë	33	(11)
2017–2018	→ Flamurtari (loan)	29	(3)
2018–2019	→ Teuta Durrës (loan)	25	(4)
2019	→ HJK Helsinki (loan)	3	(0)
2020–2024	Botoșani	54	(6)
2021–2022	→ Politehnica Iași (loan)	28	(12)
2024–2025	Unirea Slobozia	20	(0)
2025–2026	Politehnica Iași	32	(13)
2026	CSA Steaua București	6	(1)
2026–	Chindia Târgoviște	6	(5)
- * Club domestic league appearances and goals as of 31 October 2026

Sekou Camara (born 20 July 1997) is a Guinean professional footballer who plays as a forward for Liga II club Chindia Târgoviște.

== Career statistics ==
As of 31 October 2026

Appearances and goals by club, season and competition
Club	Season	League			National cup (Note: Includes Albanian Cup and Cupa României)		Other		Total	
Club	Season	Division	Apps	Goals	Apps	Goals	Apps	Goals	Apps	Goals
Besëlidhja Lezhë	2015–16	Kategoria e Parë	10	2	—		—		10	2
Besëlidhja Lezhë	2016–17	Kategoria e Parë	23	9	6	1	—		29	10
Besëlidhja Lezhë	Total		33	11	6	1	—		39	12
Flamurtari (loan)	2017–18	Kategoria Superiore	29	3	4	1	—		33	4
Teuta Durrës (loan)	2018–19	Kategoria Superiore	25	4	3	0	—		28	4
HJK (loan)	2019	Veikkausliiga	3	0	0	0	0	0	3	0
Klubi 04 (loan)	2019	Kakkonen	1	0	—		—		1	0
Botoșani	2020–21	Liga I	13	1	1	0	—		14	1
Botoșani	2021–22	Liga I	1	0	—		—		1	0
Botoșani	2022–23	Liga I	33	5	3	0	—		36	5
Botoșani	2023–24	Liga I	7	0	0	0	—		7	0
Botoșani	Total		54	6	4	0	—		58	6
Politehnica Iași (loan)	2021–22	Liga II	28	12	—		—		28	12
Unirea Slobozia	2024–25	Liga I	20	0	1	0	—		21	0
Politehnica Iași	2024–25	Liga I	14	4	0	0	2 (Note: Appearance in Liga I promotion/relegation play-offs)	0	16	4
Politehnica Iași	2025–26	Liga II	18	9	0	0	—		18	9
Politehnica Iași	Total		32	13	0	0	2	0	34	13
CSA Steaua București	2026–27	Liga II	6	1	2	0	—		8	1
Chindia Târgoviște	2026–27	Liga II	6	5	1	0	—		7	5
Career total			237	55	21	2	2	0	260	57
