= SSU Politehnica Timișoara =

Politehnica Timișoara
- Full name: Asociația Club Sportiv Știința Poli Timișoara
- Nicknames: Alb-violeții (The White-Purples); Băieții în Ghete (Boys in Boots); Timișorenii (The Timișoara People); Bănățenii (The Banat People); Echipa de pe Bega (The Bega River Team)
- Short name: Poli
- Founded: 4 December 1921; 104 years ago as Societatea Sportivă Politehnica Timișoara'; 2012; 14 years ago (reorganised) as Asociația Sportivă Universitară Politehnica Timișoara
- Ground: Electrica / Știința
- Capacity: 5,000 / 2,600
- Owners: Politehnica University of Timișoara; Timiș County Council
- General director: Dinu Bara
- Head coach: Dan Alexa
- League: Liga II
- 2025–26: Liga III, Seria IV, 1st (promoted)
- Website: https://www.politehnicatimisoara.com
| Home colours | Away colours |

Asociația Club Sportiv Știința Poli Timișoara (Romanian pronunciation: [poliˈtehnika timiˈʃo̯ara]), commonly known as Politehnica Timișoara, Știința Poli Timișoara or simply Poli Timișoara, is a Romanian professional football club based in Timișoara, Timiș County, that competes in Liga II, the second tier of Romanian football.

The original FC Politehnica Timișoara was founded in 1921 by the Politehnica University of Timișoara and won the Cupa României twice, in 1957–58 and 1979–80. Following its dissolution in 2012, many supporters backed Politehnica University of Timișoara's existing amateur team, ASU Politehnica, while ACS Recaș was relocated to Timișoara and renamed ACS Poli Timișoara that year. The original club's sporting record was subsequently transferred free of charge to ACS Poli in March 2014. Meanwhile, ASU Politehnica was competing in fifth tier of Romanian football. The two clubs attracted different sections of the city's football supporters and followed separate sporting paths. ACS Poli eventually reached Liga I but was dissolved in 2021. In the summer of 2021, ASU Politehnica was reorganised under a newly established joint-stock company, SSU Politehnica Timișoara SA. That year, the Politehnica University of Timișoara transferred the original club's brand and records to SSU Politehnica, which continues the original club's history and sporting heritage.

In 2025, a new association, Știința Poli Timișoara, was established as part of a reorganisation involving Timiș County Council, Timișoara City Hall and the Politehnica University of Timișoara, with the aim of supporting the city's football team and providing a framework for public funding.

The team plays its home matches at Electrica Stadium in Timișoara, wearing white and purple kits. Its main rivals are UTA Arad, with whom it contests the West derby.

== History ==
Established by the Politehnica University of Timișoara in 1921, the original FC Politehnica Timișoara became one of the city's leading football clubs, spending forty-four seasons in Romania's top division and winning two Cupa României trophies, in 1957–58 and 1979–80. Following changes in ownership and identity during the 1990s and 2000s, the white-and-purple side finished runner-up in Liga I in 2008–09 and 2010–11. Despite the latter result, the club was relegated to Liga II after failing to obtain a first-division licence and, following another unsuccessful licensing attempt the next year, was dissolved in September 2012.

Following the dissolution, some supporters opposed the relocation of ACS Recaș to Timișoara and instead backed ASU Politehnica, an amateur team run by the university that competed in local leagues with few other ambitions. Under Antonio Foale, who coached the team from 2004, ASU Politehnica won Series I of the Timiș Municipal Championship in the 2011–12 season, the fourth tier of the Timiș County league system and the seventh tier of Romanian football. Although supported by followers of the dissolved club, ASU Politehnica had its own competitive record and entered Liga V Timiș, the fifth tier of Romanian football, in the summer of 2012.

In the 2012–13 season, ASU Politehnica finished 2nd in Liga V Timiș under head coach Paul Codrea, who replaced Antonio Foale in March 2013, and earned promotion to Liga IV Timiș. The team finished 2nd again the following season, missing out on promotion, but won its first trophy by defeating FC Giarmata 4–3 after extra time in the Cupa României Timiș County phase, following a 3–3 draw after 90 minutes.

In January 2015, ASU Politehnica participated in Football Without Owners, an indoor friendly tournament held in Sibiu involving four Romanian clubs: ASU Politehnica, FC Argeș 1953 Pitești, FC Vaslui 2002 and hosts LSS Voința Sibiu.

ASU Politehnica won the Liga IV Timiș title in the 2014–15 season and secured promotion to Liga III for the first time in its history after a 5–1 home victory in the first leg and a 1–2 away defeat against Voința Lupac, the champions of Liga IV Caraș-Severin.

=== Professional Leagues (2015–present) ===
ASU Poli debuted very good in the 2015–16 Liga III with a victory against Minerul Motru (3–0), then they had their first victory away against Millenium Giarmata (3–1), and in the third round they defeated the last year series runners-up Metalurgistul Cugir (2–0). At the end of the season ASU Poli won their series and promoted again, this time in Liga II, after a close fight with Performanța Ighiu and Metalurgistul Cugir. During the 2016–17 Cupa României, they had their first televised cup match, a 3–0 defeat against Pandurii Târgu Jiu in the round of 32, this was also the best result in the cup after they defeated Șoimii Pâncota in the fourth round.

In the summer of 2021, ASU Politehnica Timișoara was renamed as SSU Politehnica Timișoara. The Romanian Football Federation announced before the start of the 2021–22 Liga II championship that the Polytechnic University of Timișoara, the owner of the logo, history and all of Politehnica Timișoara's football records, approves the use of these by SSU Politehnica Timișoara. So from a legal point of view, from now on, this team will be considered as the official and legal successor of the old FC Politehnica Timișoara team.

== Supporters and Rivalries ==
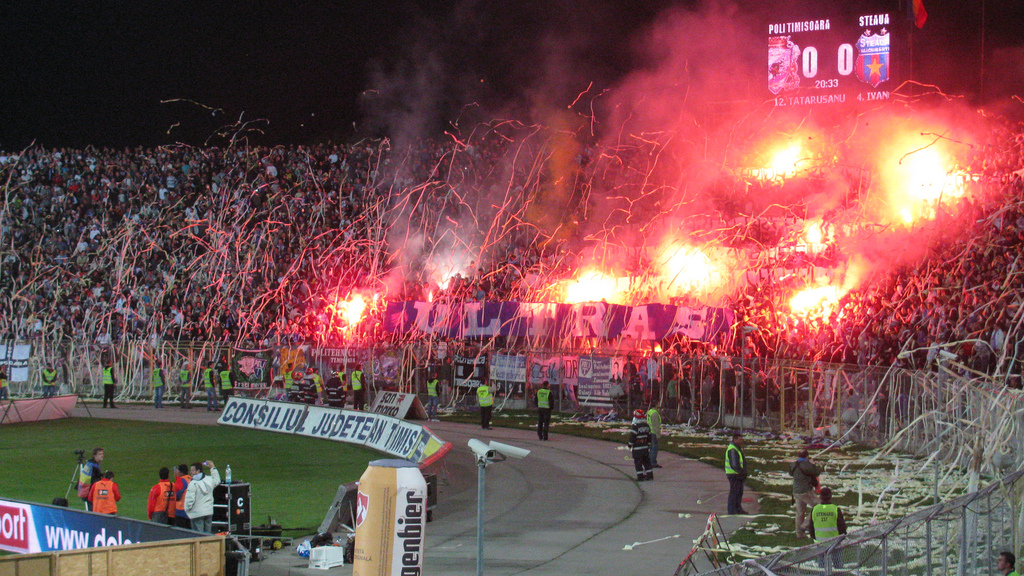
Poli Timișoara supporters during a First Division game.

Historically, Poli has been the most prominent football club in Timișoara after 1945, playing consistently in either the first or the second tier of Romanian football. Local rivalries with CFR Timișoara and UM Timișoara were relevant until the early 2000s. Afterwards, the former was relegated to a semi-professional status in the lower leagues and the latter was dissolved in 2008. A more recent local rivalry has emerged since the 2010s, with Ripensia Timișoara. Poli has many fans in Romania but also in other countries. The roots of the Poli ultras movement was found in 1995 when groups like Urban Guerilla, Gruppo Soarelui, Frenetic, Banatica, Drojdierii or Gruppo Autonomo Viola appear in the South End.

Over the years, Poli developed rivalries with UTA Arad and Dinamo București. The rivalry with UTA, also known as West Derby, stems from the natural competition between the cities of Timișoara and Arad, which are located close to each other and are the main cities in the region. Both Timișoara and Arad claim to be the first place where football was played in Romania, with Timișoara being the true first city in Romania to host a football game.

Other rivalries are shared with CFR Cluj, Bihor Oradea and Steaua București.

Over the years, Politehnica Timișoara fans have established close friendships with the supporters of Universitatea Craiova, Rapid București and the Nordkurve from Borussia Mönchengladbach.

== Honours ==
Liga III

- Winners (2): 2015–16, 2025–26
- Runners-up (2): 2023–24, 2024–25

Liga IV – Timiș County

- Winners (1): 2014–15
- Runners-up (1): 2013–14

Liga V – Timiș County

- Runners-up (1): 2012–13

=== Cups ===
- Winners of Timiș County Round (1): 2013–14

=== Friendly ===
Football without Owners Tournament

- Winners (1): 2015

Dinu Instal Winter Cup

- Winners (1): 2014

== Players ==
=== First-team squad ===
As of 23 October 2026

Note: Flags indicate national team as defined under FIFA eligibility rules; some limited exceptions apply. Players may hold more than one non-FIFA nationality.

| No. | Pos. | Nation | Player |
|---|---|---|---|
| 1 | GK | ROU | Sebastian Micu |
| 3 | DF | ROU | Cornel Ene |
| 4 | DF | POR | Pedro Paul |
| 5 | MF | ROU | Robert Burlacu-Luca |
| 6 | DF | HUN | András Huszti |
| 7 | MF | ROU | Stephan Drăghici |
| 8 | FW | ROU | David Popa (3rd captain) |
| 9 | FW | ROU | Aurelian Chițu |
| 10 | MF | ROU | Fabian Marincu (4th captain) |
| 11 | FW | ROU | Vlad Morar |
| 14 | FW | NED | Kevin Nyarko |
| 15 | DF | ROU | Aurel Vlaicu |
| 16 | MF | ROU | Ion Vasluian |
| 17 | FW | ROU | Mihai Bonț |

| No. | Pos. | Nation | Player |
|---|---|---|---|
| 18 | MF | ROU | Andrei Artean (Captain) |
| 19 | DF | ROU | Călin Toma |
| 20 | DF | ROU | Romario Benzar (Vice-captain) |
| 21 | MF | ROU | Raul Gârlonța |
| 22 | DF | ROU | Ștefan Ștefanovici |
| 23 | GK | ROU | Ionuț Rus |
| 24 | FW | ROU | Ianis Doană |
| 25 | MF | ROU | Iosif Rotariu |
| 26 | MF | ROU | Eric Adam |
| 27 | MF | ROU | Ovidiu Popescu |
| 28 | DF | MDA | Mihai Dolghi |
| 29 | FW | ROU | Dan Spătaru (on loan from Universitatea Craiova) |
| — | MF | ROU | Raul Ailenei |

=== Dual registration ===
Note: Flags indicate national team as defined under FIFA eligibility rules; some limited exceptions apply. Players may hold more than one non-FIFA nationality.

| No. | Pos. | Nation | Player |
|---|---|---|---|
| 30 | GK | ROU | Tudor Coșa (from Universitatea Cluj) |
| — | DF | ROU | Alin Techereș (from Universitatea Cluj) |

| No. | Pos. | Nation | Player |
|---|---|---|---|
| — | MF | ROU | Lukas Pall (from Universitatea Cluj) |

=== Out on loan ===
Note: Flags indicate national team as defined under FIFA eligibility rules; some limited exceptions apply. Players may hold more than one non-FIFA nationality.

| No. | Pos. | Nation | Player |
|---|---|---|---|
| — | GK | ROU | Mihai Enășescu (at Dumbrăvița until 30 June 2027) |
| — | DF | ROU | Angelo Radu (at Timișul Șag until 30 June 2027) |

| No. | Pos. | Nation | Player |
|---|---|---|---|
| — | DF | ROU | Dennis Krista (at Dumbrăvița until 30 June 2027) |

== Club officials ==
=== Board of directors ===
| Role | Name |
|---|---|
| Owners | (Romania) Politehnica University of Timișoara (Romania) Timiș County Council |
| General Director | (Romania) Dinu Bara |
| Executive Director | (Romania) Wiliam Harasim |
| President | (Romania) Simon Pescari |
| Board Member | (Romania) Iosif Rotariu |
| Sporting Director | (Romania) Ion Timofte |
| Economic Director | (Romania) Delia Drăguescu |
| Communications Director | (Romania) Cornel Biholari |
| Marketing Director | (Romania) Andrei Birtea |
| Academy Technical Director | (Romania) Ovidiu Vîlceanu |
| Organizer of Competitions | (Romania) Petre Mușat |
| Chief Scout | (Romania) Florin Bătrînu |
| Team Manager | (Romania) Ciprian Freanț |
| Head of Security | (Romania) Flavius Muntean |
| Press Officer | (Romania) Octavian Stăncioiu |

=== Current technical staff ===
| Role | Name |
|---|---|
| Head coach | (Romania) Dan Alexa |
| Assistant coaches | (Romania) Ștefan Grigorie (Romania) Antonio Foale |
| Goalkeeping coach | (Romania) Mădălin Smaranda |
| Fitness coach | (Romania) Vlad Țăran |
| Club doctor | (Jordan) Musab Al-Qatawneh |
| Physiotherapist | (Romania) Adrian Rus |
| Masseurs | (Romania) Marius Inciulescu (Romania) Adrian Blaj |
| Kit man | (Romania) Bogdan Comănișteanu |

== League and cup history ==
| Season | Tier | Division | Place | Cupa României |
|---|---|---|---|---|
| 2026–27 | 2 | Liga II | TBD | TBD |
| 2025–26 | 3 | Liga III (Seria VII) | 1st (C, P) | Play-off round |
| 2024–25 | 3 | Liga III (Seria IX) | 2nd | Third round |
| 2023–24 | 3 | Liga III (Seria VIII) | 2nd | Second round |
| 2022–23 | 2 | Liga II | 19th (R) | Third round |
| 2021–22 | 2 | Liga II | 15th | Quarter-finals |
| 2020–21 | 2 | Liga II | 6th | Round of 16 |
| 2019–20 | 2 | Liga II | 11th | Fourth Round |
| 2018–19 | 2 | Liga II | 10th | Round of 32 |
| 2017–18 | 2 | Liga II | 7th | Round of 32 |
| 2016–17 | 2 | Liga II | 15th | Round of 32 |
| 2015–16 | 3 | Liga III (Seria IV) | 1st (C, P) | |
| 2014–15 | 4 | Liga IV (TM) | 1st (C, P) | Second Round |
| 2013–14 | 4 | Liga IV (TM) | 2nd | |
| 2012–13 | 5 | Liga V (TM) | 2nd (P) | |

== Notable former players ==
The footballers enlisted below have had international cap(s) for their respective countries at junior and/or senior level and/or significant caps for SSU Politehnica Timișoara.

Romania

- (Romania) Doru Andrei
- (Romania) Mircea Axente
- (Romania) Alexandru Bădăuță
- (Romania) Dănuț Bilia
- (Romania) Cosmin Bîrnoi
- (Romania) Cristian Bocșan
- (Romania) Alexandru Cherecheș
- (Romania) Ionuț Coadă
- (Romania) Dorin Codrea
- (Romania) Cosmin Dur-Bozoancă
- (Romania) Răzvan Ghinescu
- (Romania) Otto Hindrich
- (Romania) Alin Ignea
- (Romania) Călin Jurj
- (Romania) Alin Manea
- (Romania) Ioan Mera
- (Romania) Alexandru Munteanu
- (Romania) Radu Munteanu
- (Romania) Rareș Murariu
- (Romania) Cătălin Oanea
- (Romania) Claudiu Pamfile
- (Romania) Ionuț Plămadă
- (Romania) Denis Radu
- (Romania) Marvin Schieb
- (Romania) Cristian Scutaru
- (Romania) Nicolae Șofran
- (Romania) Deian Sorescu
- (Romania) Carol Taub
- (Romania) Bogdan Vasile
- (Romania) Octavian Ursu

Bulgaria

- (Bulgaria) Aleksandar Tsvetkov

== Former managers ==
- (Romania) Antonio Foale (2012–2013)
- (Romania) Paul Codrea (2013–2014)
- (Romania) Sorin Brîndescu (2014–2017)
- (Romania) Bogdan Andone (2017–2018)
- (Romania) Cosmin Petruescu (2018–2019)
- (Romania) Octavian Benga (2019–2020)
- (Romania) Dan Alexa (2020–2021)
- (Romania) Dorin Toma (2021)
- (Romania) Nicolae Croitoru (2021–2022)
- (Romania) Bogdan Andone (2021–2022)
- (Romania) Octavian Benga (2022–2023)
- (Romania) Paul Codrea (2023–2024)
- (Romania) Cristian Gălan (2024–2025)

== See also ==
- List of fan-owned sports teams
- ASU Politehnica Timișoara (women)
