= Andrei Pavel (footballer) =

Romanian footballer

Personal information
- Full name: Andrei Vlăduț Pavel
- Date of birth: 29 July 1992 (age 34)
- Place of birth: Piatra Neamț, Romania
- Height: 1.86 m (6 ft 1 in)
- Position: Forward

Team information
- Current team: FC Bacău
- Number: 22

Youth career
- –2002: Ceahlăul Piatra Neamț

Senior career*
| Years | Team | Apps | (Gls) |
| 2009–2010 | Ceahlăul II Piatra Neamț | | |
| 2010–2014 | Ceahlăul Piatra Neamț | 14 | (3) |
| 2013 | → Cetatea Târgu Neamț (loan) | | |
| 2015 | SC Bacău | 16 | (1) |
| 2015 | FC Romania | | |
| 2016 | Gauss Răcăciuni | | |
| 2016–2017 | SC Bacău | | |
| 2017–2018 | Aerostar Bacău | 44 | (8) |
| 2019 | Foresta Suceava | 12 | (2) |
| 2020 | SCM Zalău | 1 | (0) |
| 2020–2022 | Metalul Buzău | 38 | (25) |
| 2022–2023 | Aerostar Bacău | 25 | (8) |
| 2023– | FC Bacău | 74 | (21) |
- * Club domestic league appearances and goals as of 31 October 2026

Andrei Vlad Pavel (born 29 July 1992) is a Romanian footballer who plays as a forward for Liga II club FC Bacău, which he captains.

== Honours ==
Ceahlăul Piatra Neamț

- Liga II: 2010–11

Aerostar Bacău

- Liga III: 2017–18

FC Bacău

- Liga III: 2024–25
