= Daniel Florea =

Daniel Florea may refer to:

- Daniel Florea (politician)
- Daniel Florea (footballer, born 1975)
- Daniel Florea (footballer, born 1988)
