= Ruși-Ciutea Sportsbase =

Multi-use stadium in Letea Veche, Romania

- Interactive map of Ruși-Ciutea Sportsbase
- Address: Str. Stadionului
- Location: Ruși-Ciutea, Romania
- Coordinates: 46°31′18.2″N 26°57′13.9″E
- Owner: FC Bacău
- Operator: FC Bacău
- Capacity: 700 seated
- Surface: artificial turf

Construction
- Opened: 2014
- Expanded: 2020–2025

Tenant
- FC Bacău (2014–present)

The Ruși-Ciutea Sportsbase is a multi-use stadium in Ruși-Ciutea, Romania. It is used mostly for football matches, is the home ground of FC Bacău and holds 700 people on seats.
