= Costel Enache =

Romanian footballer (born 1973)

Personal information
- Full name: Constantin Enache
- Date of birth: 11 March 1973 (age 53)
- Place of birth: Piatra Neamț, Romania
- Height: 1.78 m (5 ft 10 in)
- Position: Midfielder

Team information
- Current team: FC Bacău (head coach)

Youth career
- CSȘ Olimpia Piatra Neamț
- Viitorul Târgu Mureș

Senior career*
Years	Team	Apps	(Gls)
1991–1998	Ceahlăul Piatra Neamț^{1}	139	(27)
1998–1999	Național București	10	(1)
1999–2005	Ceahlăul Piatra Neamț	147	(20)
2005–2006	UTA Arad	8	(0)
Total		304	(48)

Managerial career
- 2008–2011: Laminorul Roman
- 2011–2013: Ceahlăul Piatra Neamț
- 2013: Politehnica Iași
- 2014: Dunărea Galați
- 2015–2016: Romania U18
- 2016: Romania U19
- 2017–2018: Botoșani
- 2018–2019: Astra Giurgiu
- 2019: Hermannstadt
- 2019–2020: Petrolul Ploiești
- 2020–2021: Universitatea Cluj
- 2021–2022: Politehnica Iași
- 2022–2023: Unirea Slobozia
- 2023–: FC Bacău
- * Club domestic league appearances and goals

Constantin "Costel" Enache (born 11 March 1973) is a Romanian professional football coach and former player, currently in charge of Liga II club FC Bacău.

== Coaching career ==
=== Politehnica Iași ===
Enache was appointed head coach of Liga II club Politehnica Iași in the summer of 2013, only to be released six months later due to bad results.

=== Botoșani ===
On 5 June 2017, Enache was appointed head coach of Liga I club Botoșani. On 16 November 2018, Botoșani and Enache mutually agreed to end the coach's contract.

=== Astra Giurgiu ===
On 17 November 2018, Enache was appointed head coach of Liga I club Astra Giurgiu. On 13 June 2019, Enache was replaced with Dan Alexa as the head coach of Astra Giurgiu.

=== Hermannstadt ===
On 17 June 2019, Enache was appointed head coach of Liga I club Hermannstadt. On 30 September 2019, Hermannstadt and Enache mutually agreed to end the coach's contract.

=== Petrolul Ploiești ===
On 17 December 2019, Enache was appointed head coach of Petrolul Ploiești.

== Honours ==
=== Player ===
Ceahlăul Piatra Neamț

- Divizia B: 1992–93

=== Coach ===
Astra Giurgiu

- Cupa României runner-up: 2018–19

FC Bacău

- Liga III: 2024–25

== Notes ==
^{^1} First League appearances and goals only, the 1991–92 and 1992–93 Second League appearances and goals scored for Ceahlăul Piatra Neamț are unavailable.
