= Giovani Ghimfuș =

Romanian footballer (born 2005)

Personal information
- Full name: David Giovani Ghimfuș
- Date of birth: 12 July 2005 (age 21)
- Place of birth: Granada, Spain
- Height: 1.78 m (5 ft 10 in)
- Position: Midfielder

Team information
- Current team: Sepsi OSK
- Number: 19

Youth career
- –2017: Prosport Academy
- 2017–2022: Concordia Chiajna

Senior career*
Years	Team	Apps	(Gls)
2022–2024	Concordia Chiajna	57	(12)
2025–	Sepsi OSK	14	(0)
2026	→ Metaloglobus București (loan)	12	(0)
- * Club domestic league appearances and goals as of 2 May 2026

David Giovani Ghimfuș (born 12 July 2005) is a Romanian professional footballer who plays as a midfielder for Liga I club Sepsi OSK.
