= Matei Tănasă =

Romanian footballer

Personal information
- Full name: Matei Adrian Tănasă
- Date of birth: 8 October 2005 (age 21)
- Place of birth: Iași, Romania
- Height: 1.80 m (5 ft 11 in)
- Position: Midfielder

Team information
- Current team: CSM Vaslui

Youth career
- –2019: Didi Junior Iași
- 2019–2022: FCSB

Senior career*
Years	Team	Apps	(Gls)
2022–2024	FCSB	1	(0)
2023–2024	→ Gloria Buzău (loan)	25	(0)
2024–2025	Politehnica Iași	3	(0)
2025–2026	Metalul Buzău	6	(0)
2026–	CSM Vaslui		

International career^{‡}
2021	Romania U16	2	(0)
2021	Romania U17	7	(0)
2022–2023	Romania U18	6	(3)
- * Club domestic league appearances and goals as of 13 September 2025 ‡ National team caps and goals as of 18 June 2023

Matei Tănasă (born 8 October 2005) is a Romanian professional footballer who plays as a midfielder who is currently playing for Liga III club CSM Vaslui.

== Career statistics ==
As of match played 30 August 2025

Appearances and goals by club, season and competition
Club	Season	League			Cupa României		Continental		Other		Total	
Club	Season	Division	Apps	Goals	Apps	Goals	Apps	Goals	Apps	Goals	Apps	Goals
FCSB	2021–22	Liga I	1	0	—		—		—		1	0
FCSB	2022–23	Liga I	0	0	1	1	0	0	—		1	1
FCSB	Total		1	0	1	1	0	0	—		2	1
Gloria Buzău (loan)	2023–24	Liga II	25	0	4	1	—		—		29	1
Politehnica Iași	2024–25	Liga I	3	0	1	0	—		—		4	0
Metalul Buzău	2025–26	Liga II	5	0	2	0	—		—		7	0
Career total			34	0	8	2	0	0	—		42	2
