= Patrick Petre =

Romanian footballer

Personal information
- Full name: Patrick Mihai Petre
- Date of birth: 9 May 1997 (age 29)
- Place of birth: Bucharest, Romania
- Height: 1.72 m (5 ft 7 1/2 in)
- Position: Winger

Team information
- Current team: FC Bacău
- Number: 24

Youth career
- 2004–2014: Dinamo București

Senior career*
Years	Team	Apps	(Gls)
2014–2018	Dinamo București	19	(2)
2017–2018	→ Sepsi OSK (loan)	25	(1)
2018–2019	Politehnica Iași	24	(1)
2019	Farul Constanța	8	(0)
2020–2021	Dacia Unirea Brăila	24	(14)
2022	Minaur Baia Mare	8	(3)
2022–2025	Ceahlăul Piatra Neamț	73	(25)
2025–	FC Bacău	21	(3)

International career
2013–2014	Romania U17	4	(0)
2015–2016	Romania U19	8	(2)
- * Club domestic league appearances and goals as of 31 October 2026

Patrick Mihai Petre (born 9 May 1997) is a Romanian professional footballer who plays as a winger for Liga II club FC Bacău.

== Club career ==
Petre joined Dinamo București at the age of 6 and gradually progressed through the various youth teams. On October 31, 2014, at the age of seventeen, he made his Liga I debut in a 3–0 loss to rivals Steaua București.

In the summer of 2017, after falling down the pecking order at Dinamo, Petre went on a season-long loan to newly promoted club Sepsi OSK. In July 2018, Petre was transferred to another Liga I club, the highly aspiring Politehnica Iași, where he was requested by his former Dinamo manager, Flavius Stoican.

== Personal life ==
Patrick Petre is the son of former Romanian international and Dinamo București legend, Florentin Petre.

== Honours ==
Dinamo București

- Cupa României runner-up: 2015–16
- Cupa Ligii: 2016–17

Minaur Baia Mare

- Liga III: 2021–22
