= Gonçalo Teixeira =

Gonçalo Teixeira is a masculine Portuguese name. It may refer to:

- Gonçalo Teixeira Correa (died 1632), Portuguese artillerist who instructed Ming Chinese armies
- Gonçalo Teixeira (model), Portuguese model
