= Dedeman =

Romanian home improvement retailer

- Founded: 1992
- Headquarters: Bacău, Romania Greece
- Number of locations: 65 stores (2025)
- Area served: Romania, Greece
- Revenue: ▲2.32b EUR (2023); 2.23b EUR (2022)
- Net income: ▼308m EUR (2023); 344m EUR (2022)
- Total equity: ▼973m EUR (2023); 1,009m EUR (2022)
- Owner: Dragos Paval (60%); Adrian Paval (40%)
- Number of employees: 12,750 (2025)
- Website: https://www.dedeman.ro/

Dedeman is a hypermarket chain with 100% Romanian capital offering home improvement and do-it-yourself goods. The motto is "Dedicat planurilor tale", which means "Dedicated to your plans". It is based in Bacău and operates 65 stores (as of January 2026) in the country. Dedeman was established in 1992.

== History ==
Dedeman was founded in 1992 by two brothers named Adrian and Dragoș Pavăl, in Bacău, Romania.

Its first store was initially only 16 square meters, selling various retail merchandise.

Since 2010, Dedeman is the DIY market leader in Romania by turnover, and since 2012, its increasing number of stores has cemented its position as such.

In October 2011, Dedeman became, for the first time, sponsor of the Romanian Olympic and Sporting Committee for two years. The partnership continued in 2015, under the brand "Team Romania", when Dedeman became Main Partner of the Romanian Olympic and Sporting Committee for a period of 5 years.

In 2014, Dedeman signed a sponsorship with the Romanian tennis player Simona Halep.

In 2015, Dedeman became the fourth biggest player in the Central and East Europe DIY market, with a market share of 1.9%, according to a study by PMR Research.

== Financial figures ==
Company Metrics
| Year | Store Count | Employees | Turnover (EUR) |
|---|---|---|---|
| 2023 | 59 | 12,113 | 2.32b |
| 2022 | 58 | 12,245 | 2.23b |
| 2021 | 57 | 11,948 | 2.02b |
| 2020 | 54 | 11,374 | 1.87b |
| 2019 | 50 | 10,769 | 1.72b |
| 2018 | 49 | 10,413 | 1.54b |
| 2017 | 48 | 9,818 | 1.36b |
| 2016 | 45 | 8,421 | 1.16b |
| 2015 | 40 | 7,656 | 0.96b |
| 2014 | 41 | 7,179 | 0.76b |
| 2013 | 36 | 6,489 | 0.60b |
| 2026 | 65 | 12,702 | €2.61 billion |

In 2025-2026 they bought the Greek Retail named Praktiker Hellas for €130M. Currently their shops are known as "Dedeman Hellas"

- subsequently they crossed the € 2billions mark and bought "Carrefour Romania" for a total of €823 millions, now known as "Korra"
