= Ștefan Ștefanovici =

Romanian footballer

Personal information
- Date of birth: 20 February 2002 (age 24)
- Place of birth: Iași, Romania
- Height: 1.71 m (5 ft 7 in)
- Positions: Left-back; winger

Team information
- Current team: Politehnica Timișoara
- Number: 22

Youth career
- –2020: Sporting Vaslui
- 2019–2020: → Petrolul Ploiești (loan)

Senior career*
Years	Team	Apps	(Gls)
2019–2024	Sporting Vaslui		
2019–2020	→ Petrolul Ploiești (loan)	0	(0)
2022–2024	→ Politehnica Iași (loan)	45	(1)
2024–2026	Politehnica Iași	62	(5)
2026–	Politehnica Timișoara	11	(2)

International career^{‡}
2018	Romania U16	1	(0)
2018–2019	Romania U17	10	(0)
2019–2020	Romania U18	7	(0)
2019	Romania U19	1	(0)
2024	Romania U21	1	(0)
- * Club domestic league appearances and goals as of 31 October 2026 ‡ National team caps and goals as of 21 October 2024

Ștefan Ștefanovici (born 20 February 2002) is a Romanian professional footballer who plays as a left-back or a winger for Liga II club Politehnica Timișoara.

== Honours ==
Politehnica Iași

- Liga II: 2022–23
