= Tailson =

Tailson may refer to:

- Taílson (footballer, born 1975), full name José Ilson dos Santos, Brazilian football striker
- Tailson (footballer, born 1999), full name Tailson Pinto Gonçalves, Brazilian football forward
