= Ștefan Dobay Stadium =

Romanian stadium

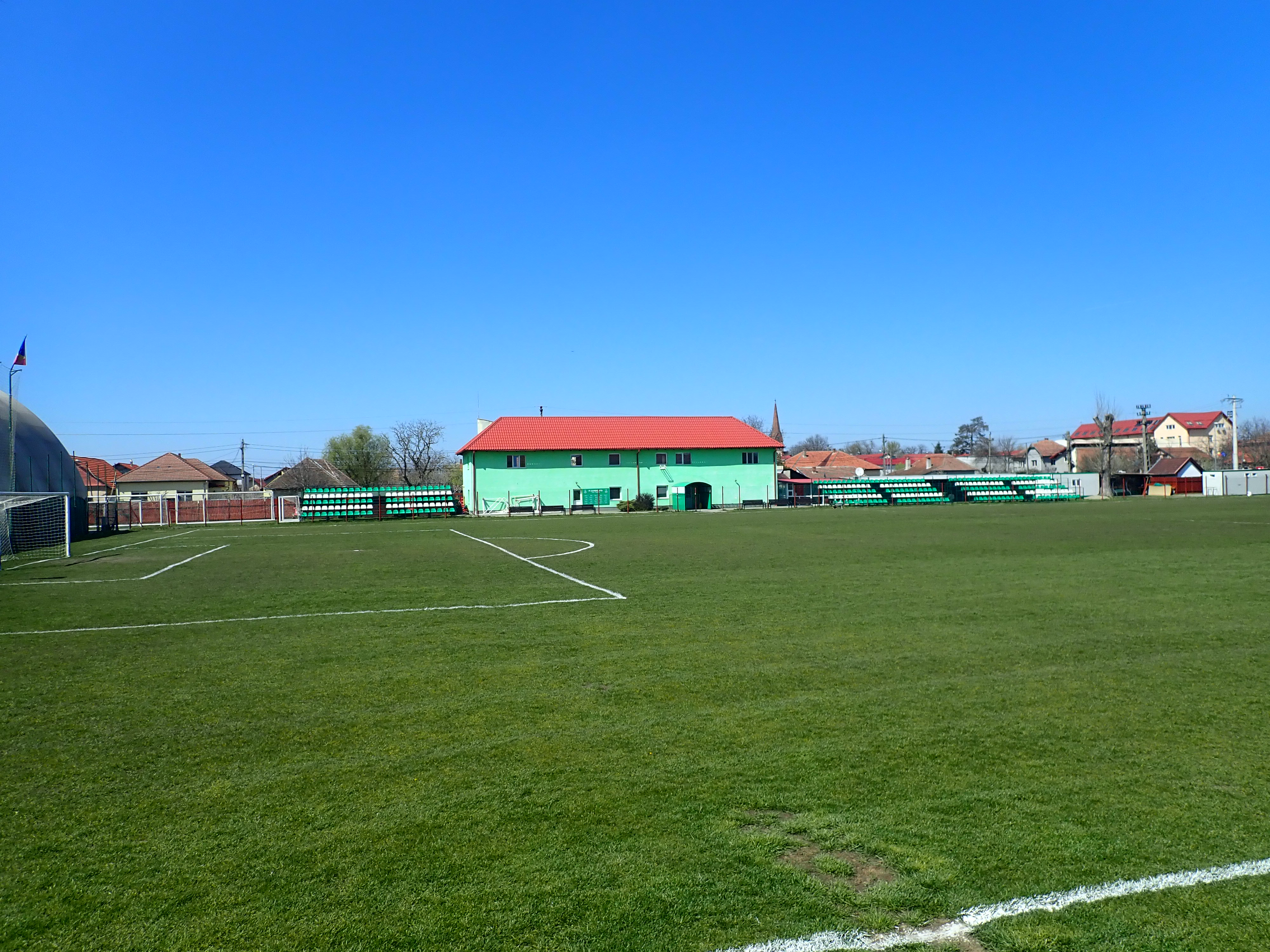
- Interactive map of Ștefan Dobay Stadium
- Former names: Stadionul Comunal
- Address: Str. Mihai Eminescu 44
- Location: Dumbrăvița, Romania
- Coordinates: 45°47′57.0″N 21°14′59.2″E
- Owner: Commune of Dumbrăvița
- Operator: CSC Dumbrăvița
- Capacity: 1,000 (500 seated)
- Surface: Grass

Tenant
- Dumbrăvița (2009–present)

The Ștefan Dobay Stadium is a multi-purpose stadium in Dumbrăvița, Romania. It is currently used mostly for football matches, is the home ground of CSC Dumbrăvița and has a capacity of 1,000 people (500 on seats). Since 2018, the stadium is named after a legend of the Romanian football, Ștefan Dobay, who was born in Dumbrăvița.
