= Alin Roman =

Romanian footballer

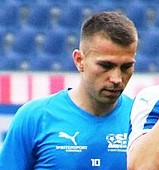
- Roman in 2021

Personal information
- Date of birth: 27 January 1994 (age 32)
- Place of birth: Timișoara, Romania
- Height: 1.73 m (5 ft 8 in)
- Position: Midfielder

Team information
- Current team: UTA Arad
- Number: 8

Youth career
- –2011: LPS Banatul Timișoara

Senior career*
Years	Team	Apps	(Gls)
2011–2012	FCMU Baia Mare	21	(6)
2012–2014	Dinamo II București	18	(4)
2014	Dinamo București	1	(0)
2013	→ ASA Târgu Mureș (loan)	7	(0)
2014	→ ACS Poli Timișoara (loan)	3	(0)
2014	Metalul Reșița	9	(0)
2015	FC Caransebeș	21	(3)
2016	UTA Arad	9	(0)
2016	Național Sebiș		
2017	SV Bad Goisern	13	(8)
2017–2018	Union Vöcklamarkt	14	(4)
2018–2019	Stadl-Paura	38	(14)
2019–2020	Vorwärts Steyr	19	(5)
2020–2022	SKU Amstetten	51	(12)
2022–2025	Politehnica Iași	95	(21)
2025–	UTA Arad	52	(6)

International career
2010–2011	Romania U17	4	(0)
2011	Romania U17	1	(0)
2012	Romania U19	3	(0)
- * Club domestic league appearances and goals as of 6 November 2026

Alin Roman (born 27 January 1994) is a Romanian professional footballer who plays as a midfielder for Liga I club UTA Arad.

== Career statistics ==
=== Club ===
As of match played 6 November 2026

Appearances and goals by club, season and competition
Club	Season	League			National cup (Note: Includes Cupa României, Austrian Cup)		Europe		Other		Total	
Club	Season	Division	Apps	Goals	Apps	Goals	Apps	Goals	Apps	Goals	Apps	Goals
FCMU Baia Mare	2011–12	Liga II	21	6	0	0	–		–		21	6
Dinamo II București	2012–13	Liga II	18	4	1	0	–		–		19	4
Dinamo București	2012–13	Liga I	1	0	–		–		–		1	0
ASA Târgu Mureș (loan)	2013–14	Liga II	7	0	1	0	–		–		8	0
ACS Poli Timișoara (loan)	2013–14	Liga II	3	0	–		–		–		3	0
Metalul Reșița	2014–15	Liga II	9	0	0	0	–		–		9	0
FC Caransebeș	2014–15	Liga II	10	3	–		–		–		10	3
FC Caransebeș	2015–16	Liga II	11	0	1	0	–		–		12	0
FC Caransebeș	Total		21	3	1	0	–		–		22	3
UTA Arad	2015–16	Liga II	9	0	–		–		0	0	9	0
Național Sebiș	2016–17	Liga III					–		–			
SV Bad Goisern	2016–17	Bezirksliga	13	8	–		–		–		13	8
Union Vöcklamarkt	2017–18	Regionalliga Mitte	14	4	1	0	–		–		15	4
Stadl-Paura	2017–18	Regionalliga Mitte	10	0	–		–		–		10	0
Stadl-Paura	2018–19	Regionalliga Mitte	28	14	2	1	–		–		30	15
Stadl-Paura	Total		38	14	2	1	–		–		40	15
Vorwärts Steyr	2019–20	2. Liga	19	5	2	1	–		–		21	6
SKU Amstetten	2020–21	2. Liga	21	5	3	0	–		–		24	5
SKU Amstetten	2021–22	2. Liga	28	6	3	1	–		–		31	7
SKU Amstetten	2022–23	2. Liga	2	1	1	0	–		–		3	1
SKU Amstetten	Total		51	12	7	1	–		–		58	13
Politehnica Iași	2022–23	Liga II	26	7	0	0	–		–		26	7
Politehnica Iași	2023–24	Liga I	32	10	1	0	–		–		33	10
Politehnica Iași	2024–25	Liga I	37	4	3	0	–		2 (Note: Appearances in Liga I promotion/relegation play-offs)	0	42	4
Politehnica Iași	Total		95	21	4	0	–		2	0	101	21
UTA Arad	2025–26	Liga I	37	6	4	1	–		–		41	7
UTA Arad	2026–27	Liga I	15	0	2	1	–		–		17	1
UTA Arad	Total		52	6	6	2	–		–		58	8
Career total			371	83	25	5	–		2	0	398	88

== Honours ==
Politehnica Iași

- Liga II: 2022–23
