= Buzău Municipal Stadium (Crâng Stadium) =

Stadium in Buzău, Romania

- Crâng (Grove)
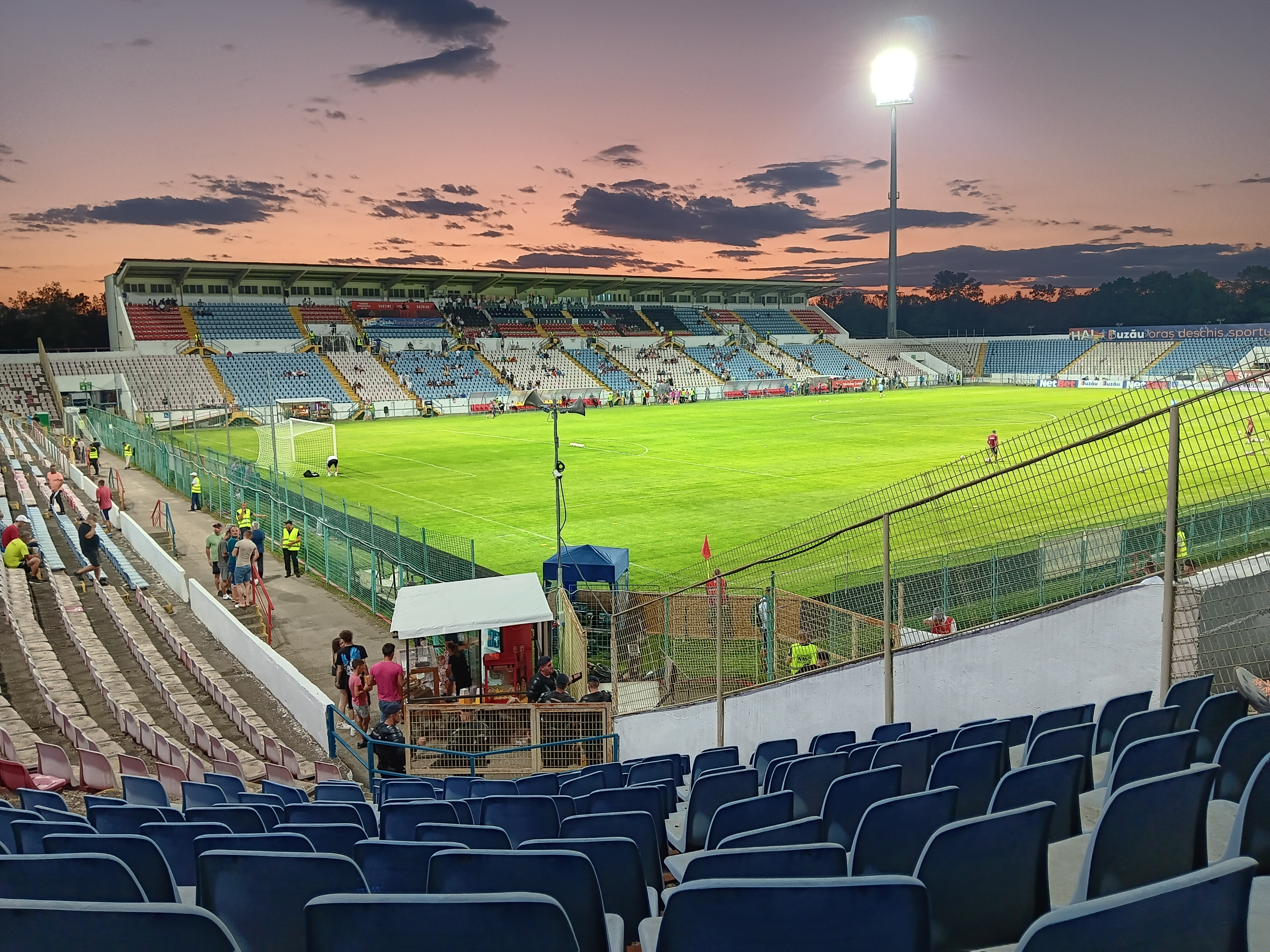
- The venue in 2024
- Interactive map of Buzău Municipal Stadium (Crâng Stadium)
- Former names: Gloria Stadium
- Address: Bvd. Mareșal Averescu 1-5
- Location: Buzău, Romania
- Coordinates: 45°8′45.7″N 26°48′12″E
- Owner: Municipality of Buzău
- Capacity: 12,321 seated
- Surface: Grass
- Field size: 105 x 68 m

Construction
- Built: 1936–1942
- Opened: 1942
- Renovated: 1971, 1976, 2007-2008

Tenants
- FC Gloria Buzău (1973–2016); FC Buzău (2016–2025); Chindia Târgoviște (2021–2022)

The Buzău Municipal Stadium is a multi-purpose stadium located in the Crâng Park, in Buzău, Romania. It is currently used mostly for football matches and was the home ground of FC Buzău. The stadium was built between 1936–1942, on the initiative of Buzău mayor Stan Săraru. It underwent a major refurbishment between 1971 and 1976. It was refurbished again in 2007 when it was transformed into an all-seater stadium.

== See also ==
- List of football stadiums in Romania
