= CSC Dumbrăvița =

Romanian football club

- Full name: Clubul Sportiv Comunal Dumbrăvița
- Nicknames: Dumbrăvițenii (The People from Dumbrăvița); Alb-Verzii (The White and Greens)
- Short name: Dumbrăvița
- Founded: 2008; 18 years ago
- Ground: Ștefan Dobay
- Capacity: 1,000 (500 seated)
- Owner: Dumbrăvița Commune
- Chairman: Florin Macavei
- Head coach: Florin Fabian
- League: Liga II
- 2025–26: Liga II, 16th of 22
- Website: cscdumbravita.ro
Home colours	Away colours	Third colours

Clubul Sportiv Comunal Dumbrăvița, commonly known as CSC Dumbrăvița, FC Dumbrăvița, or simply as Dumbrăvița, is a Romanian professional football club based in Dumbrăvița, Timiș County, which competes in the Liga II.

Founded in 2008, CSC Dumbrăvița played at the amateur level until 2018, when it promoted to the Liga III. The geographic positioning of Dumbrăvița, located near the city of Timișoara, resulted in a 168% population growth between the 2002 and 2011, and subsequently led to a significant increase in the economic strength of the commune in the recent years. In the summer of 2022, the club achieved promotion for the first time to the Liga II.

The team plays its home matches at the Stadionul Ștefan Dobay, which is named after the most notable footballer born in Dumbrăvița.

== History ==
CSC Dumbrăvița was founded in 2008, somewhat as a result of the commune's economic development over the last 20 years. Enrolled in the Liga IV, Timiș County series, on the place of Top Alumino Timișoara, "the white and greens" were ranked in the middle of the table for most of their seasons, the best performance until promotion being a 4th place at the end of the 2015–16 edition. Dumbrăvița won Liga IV, Timiș Series at the end of the 2017–18 season, as well as the promotion play-off against Mehedinți County champions, Viitorul Șimian.

In their first season of Liga III, Dumbrăvițenii were ranked 3rd in the 4th series, after champions CSM Reșița and runners-up Șoimii Lipova, until now, this being the best performance in the history of the club near Timișoara.

== Grounds ==
CSC Dumbrăvița plays its home matches on Ștefan Dobay Stadium in Dumbrăvița, with a capacity of 1,000 seats. The stadium is named in honor of Ștefan Dobay, biggest sporting personality born in the commune.

== Honours ==
Liga III

- Winners (1): 2021–22

Liga IV – Timiș County

- Winners (1): 2017–18

== Players ==
=== First team squad ===
As of 21 October 2026

Note: Flags indicate national team as defined under FIFA eligibility rules; some limited exceptions apply. Players may hold more than one non-FIFA nationality.

No.	Pos.	Nation	Player
3	MF	ROU	Fabiano Cibi
4	DF	ROU	Alexandru Negrea
5	DF	ROU	Nicholas Pop (on loan from Universitatea Cluj)
6	DF	ROU	Dennis Krista (on loan from Politehnica Timișoara)
7	MF	ROU	Bogdan Vasile (Vice-captain)
8	MF	ROU	Matteo Paunovici
9	FW	ROU	Andrei Burlacu
10	MF	ROU	Răzvan Gunie
11	MF	ROU	Robert Curescu
12	GK	ROU	Mihai Enășescu (on loan from Politehnica Timișoara)
13	FW	ROU	Cristian Pădurariu
14	FW	ROU	Dragoș Mucuță
15	DF	ROU	Rareș Butnărașu (on loan from Ripensia Timișoara)

No.	Pos.	Nation	Player
16	DF	ROU	Gabriel Gladun
17	FW	ROU	Alexandru Buțu
18	MF	ROU	Norbert Leczki
19	DF	ROU	Dragoș Datcu (on loan from Ghiroda)
20	MF	ROU	Mateo Lăcătuș
21	DF	MTQ	Damien Dussaut
22	GK	ROU	Paul Toroc
24	DF	ROU	Cosmin Gladun
25	DF	ROU	Bogdan Panaite
27	DF	ROU	Sergiu Popovici (3rd captain)
30	DF	ROU	Alin Șeroni (Captain)
99	GK	ROU	Róbert Miklós

== Club Officials ==
=== Board of directors ===
Role	Name
Owner	(Romania) Dumbrăvița Commune
President	(Romania) Florin Macavei
Sporting director	(Romania) Radu Suciu
Technical director	(Romania) Levente Iszak
Team Manager	(Romania) Adrian Scrob

=== Current technical staff ===
Role	Name
Head coach	(Romania) Florin Fabian
Assistant coach	(Romania) Călin Mada
Goalkeeping coach	(Romania) Călin Frunză
Fitness coach	(Romania) Cătălin Stănilă
Club Doctor	(Romania) Dragomir Halmagy
Physiotherapist	(Romania) Adrian Gherovăț
Masseur	(Romania) Cătălin Brănețu
Storeman	(Romania) Ovidiu Morariu

== League history ==
Season	Tier	Division	Place	Notes	Cupa României
2026–27	2	Liga II	TBD		Third round
2025–26	2	Liga II	16th		Group Stage
2024–25	2	Liga II	18th	Spared from (R)	Play-off round
2023–24	2	Liga II	15th		Play-off round
2022–23	2	Liga II	14th		Group Stage
2021–22	3	Liga III (Seria VIII)	1st (C)	Promoted	Second round
2020–21	3	Liga III (Seria VIII)	3rd		Third round

Season	Tier	Division	Place	Notes	Cupa României
2019–20	3	Liga III (Seria IV)	6th		Second round
2018–19	3	Liga III (Seria IV)	3rd		
2017–18	4	Liga IV (TM)	1st (C)	Promoted	
2016–17	4	Liga IV (TM)	6th		
2015–16	4	Liga IV (TM)	5th		
2014–15	4	Liga IV (TM)	7th		

== Notable former players ==
The footballers enlisted below have had international cap(s) for their respective countries at junior and/or senior level and/or significant caps for Dumbrăvița.

Romania

- (Romania) Carlo Casap
- (Romania) Răzvan Ghinescu
- (Romania) Alin Ignea
- (Romania) Alexandru Martinov
- (Romania) Răzvan Morariu
- (Romania) Eduard Pap
- (Romania) Dragan Paulevici
- (Romania) Adrian Poparadu
- (Romania) Cristian Scutaru
- (Romania) Nicolae Șofran
- (Romania) Ionuț Tănase
- (Romania) Cătălin Trifon
- (Romania) Adrian Zaluschi
- (Romania) Costel Zurbagiu

Morocco

- (Morocco) Ouadie Salhi

== Notable former managers ==
- (Romania) Sorin Bălu (2017–2020)
- (Romania) Cosmin Stan (2021–2025)
