= Ionuț Dinu =

Romanian footballer (born 1998)

Personal information
- Full name: Ionuț Alexandru Dinu
- Date of birth: 8 April 1998 (age 28)
- Place of birth: Caracal, Romania
- Height: 1.85 m (6 ft 1 in)
- Position: Centre-back

Team information
- Current team: CSA Steaua București
- Number: 6

Youth career
- 2004–2011: CSȘ Caracal
- 2011–2015: Viitorul Mihai Georgescu Cluj
- 2015–2016: Steaua București
- 2016: → Viitorul Mihai Georgescu Cluj (loan)

Senior career*
Years	Team	Apps	(Gls)
2016–2018	FCSB II		
2018–2022	FCSB	0	(0)
2018–2019	→ Academica Clinceni (loan)	2	(0)
2019–2022	→ Unirea Slobozia (loan)	46	(5)
2022–2026	Unirea Slobozia	84	(7)
2026–	CSA Steaua București	11	(2)

International career
2016	Romania U19	1	(0)
- * Club domestic league appearances and goals as of 25 October 2026

Ionuț Alexandru Dinu (born 8 April 1998) is a Romanian professional footballer who plays as a centre-back for Liga II club CSA Steaua București.

== Honours ==
Unirea Slobozia

- Liga II: 2023–24
- Liga III: 2019–20
