= 2026–27 FC UTA Arad season =

UTA Arad
2026–27 season
- Superliga: Pre-season
- Cupa României: Pre-season

The 2026–27 football season is the 82nd season in the history of UTA Arad and the seventh consecutive season in Liga I. The club will also compete in the Cupa României.

== Transfers ==
=== In ===
Pos.	Player	Transferred from	Fee	Date	Source
MF	(Romania) Alexandru Hodoșan	(Romania) CSC Dumbrăvița	Loan return	30 June 2026	
FW	(Romania) Marius Coman	(Romania) Sepsi OSK	Loan made permanent	1 July 2026	
DF	(Romania) Andrei Dorobanțu	(Romania) AFC Unirea Slobozia	Loan	1 July 2026	
MF	(Romania) Răzvan Oaidă	(Romania) Universitatea Cluj	Free	1 July 2026	
MF	(France) Jayson Papeau	(Romania) Unirea Slobozia	Free	1 July 2026	
FW	(Romania) Alexi Pitu	(Denmark) Vejle	Free	1 July 2026	
FW	(Kosovo) Ismet Sinani	(Italy) AC Bra	Free	1 July 2026	

=== Out ===
Pos.	Player	Transferred to	Fee	Date	Source
MF	(Romania) Ovidiu Popescu	(Romania) SSU Politehnica Timișoara	Free	1 July 2026	
DF	(Martinique) Florent Poulolo	(Romania) Universitatea Cluj	Free	1 July 2026	

== Pre-season and friendlies ==
20 June 2026 Friendly	Progresul Pecica (Romania)	0–3	(Romania) UTA Arad
10:00

27 June 2026 Friendly	UTA Arad (Romania)	4–0	(Romania) Dumbrăvița	Arad
11:00	23'; 49'; 79'; 89' (pen.)

4 July 2026 Friendly	Radnički Niš (Serbia)	v	(Romania) UTA Arad
17:00

7 July 2026 Friendly	Brinje Grosuplje (Slovenia)	v	(Romania) UTA Arad
14:00

8 July 2026 Friendly	Istra 1961 (Croatia)	2–2	(Romania) UTA Arad
16:30	45+8' (pen.); 90+26'		21', 28'

== Competitions ==
=== Superliga ===
Pos	Team	Pld	W	D	L	GF	GA	GD	Pts	Qualification
12	Oțelul Galați	5	1	3	1	6	6	0	6	Advances to Play-out
13	Voluntari	6	1	1	4	5	16	−11	4	Advances to Play-out
14	Botoșani	5	0	3	2	6	8	−2	3	Advances to Play-out
15	UTA Arad	6	0	3	3	3	9	−6	3	Advances to Play-out
16	Csíkszereda Miercurea Ciuc	5	0	1	4	2	9	−7	1	Advances to Play-out

Updated to match(es) played on 23 August 2026. Source: LPF (in Romanian)
Rules for classification: 1) Points; 2) Head-to-head points; 3) Head-to-head goal difference; 4) Head-to-head goals scored; 5) Goal difference; 6) Goals scored; 7) Play-off.

Pos	Team	Pld	W	D	L	GF	GA	GD	Pts	Qualification	1	2	3	4	5	6
1	1	0	0	0	0	0	0	0	0	Qualification to Champions League first qualifying round						
2	2	0	0	0	0	0	0	0	0	Qualification to Conference League second qualifying round						
3	3	0	0	0	0	0	0	0	0	Qualification to European competition play-offs						
4	4	0	0	0	0	0	0	0	0							
5	5	0	0	0	0	0	0	0	0							
6	6	0	0	0	0	0	0	0	0							

Source: LPF (in Romanian)
Rules for classification: 1) Points; 2) Points without rounding; 3) Points in the regular season; 4) Head-to-head points; 5) Head-to-head goal difference; 6) Head-to-head goals scored; 7) Goal difference; 8) Goals scored; 9) Play-off (only if needed to decide champion or teams for UEFA competitions). (Note: only criteria 7 and 8 are applied to establish the classification during the competition.

Pos	Team	Pld	W	D	L	GF	GA	GD	Pts	Qualification or relegation	7	8	9	10	11	12	13	14	15	16
7	7	0	0	0	0	0	0	0	0	Qualification to European competition play-offs										
8	8	0	0	0	0	0	0	0	0	Qualification to European competition play-offs										
9	9	0	0	0	0	0	0	0	0											
10	10	0	0	0	0	0	0	0	0											
11	11	0	0	0	0	0	0	0	0											
12	12	0	0	0	0	0	0	0	0											
13	13	0	0	0	0	0	0	0	0	Qualification to relegation play-offs										
14	14	0	0	0	0	0	0	0	0	Qualification to relegation play-offs										
15	15	0	0	0	0	0	0	0	0	Relegated to Liga II										
16	16	0	0	0	0	0	0	0	0	Relegated to Liga II										

Source: LPF (in Romanian)
Rules for classification: 1) Points; 2) Points without rounding; 3) Points in the regular season; 4) Head-to-head points; 5) Head-to-head goal difference; 6) Head-to-head goals scored; 7) Goal difference; 8) Goals scored; 9) Play-off (only if needed to decide champion or teams for UEFA competitions). (Note: only criteria 7 and 8 are applied to establish the classification during the competition.

==== Results by round ====
Round	1	2
Ground	A	H
Result	L	
Position		

A = Away; H = Home; W = Win; D = Draw; L = Loss

18 July 2026 1	Universitatea Craiova	4–0	UTA Arad	Craiova
21:15				Stadium: Ion Oblemenco Stadium

24 July 2026 2	UTA Arad	v	Oțelul Galați	Arad
18:30				Stadium: Francisc von Neuman Stadium
