= Alexandru Melniciuc =

Romanian footballer (born 2005)

Personal information
- Date of birth: 29 March 2005 (age 21)
- Place of birth: Arad, Romania
- Height: 1.67 m (5 ft 6 in)
- Positions: Attacking midfielder; forward

Team information
- Current team: Universitatea Craiova

Youth career
- 2012–2019: Viitorul Arad
- 2019–2021: Prosport Academy
- 2021–2022: Academica Clinceni

Senior career*
Years	Team	Apps	(Gls)
2022	Academica Clinceni	8	(0)
2022–	Universitatea Craiova	0	(0)
2023	→ Unirea Slobozia (loan)	6	(0)
2024	→ Tunari (loan)	2	(0)

International career
2019–2020	Romania U15	8	(10)
2020	Romania U16	4	(2)
2021–2022	Romania U17	9	(1)
2022–2023	Romania U18	9	(1)
- * Club domestic league appearances and goals as of 11 May 2024

Alexandru Melniciuc (born 29 March 2005) is a Romanian professional footballer who plays as an attacking midfielder or forward for Liga I club Universitatea Craiova.

== Honours ==
CSU Craiova U19

- Liga de Tineret U19: 2023

Unirea Slobozia

- Liga II: 2023–24
