= Florinel Ibrian =

Romanian footballer (born 1993)

Personal information
- Full name: Florinel Valentin Ibrian
- Date of birth: 14 September 1993 (age 33)
- Place of birth: Slobozia, Romania
- Height: 1.79 m (5 ft 10 in)
- Position: Right-back

Team information
- Current team: Unirea Slobozia
- Number: 21

Youth career
- –2012: Unirea Slobozia

Senior career*
Years	Team	Apps	(Gls)
2011–2015	Unirea Slobozia	57	(7)
2015	Afumați		
2016–	Unirea Slobozia	119	(8)
2016–2017	→ Dunărea Călărași (loan)	33	(3)
- * Club domestic league appearances and goals as of 31 October 2026

Florinel Valentin Ibrian (born 14 September 1999) is a Romanian professional footballer who plays as a right-back for Liga II club Unirea Slobozia.

== Honours ==
Unirea Slobozia

- Liga II: 2023–24
- Liga III: 2011–12, 2019–20
