= Leontin =

Leontin is a Romanian male given name that may refer to:

- Leontin Chițescu (born 1980), footballer
- Leontin Doană (born 1970), Romanian footballer and manager
- Leontin Grozavu (born 1967), Romanian football player and manager
- Leontin Sălăjan (1913–1966), Romanian communist military and political leader
- Leontin Toader (born 1964), Romanian football goalkeeper
