= Iosif Damaschin =

Romanian footballer

Personal information
- Date of birth: 1 September 1963 (age 63)
- Place of birth: Jilavele, Romania
- Height: 1.74 m (5 ft 9 in)
- Position: Forward

Youth career
- 1980–1982: Unirea Urziceni

Senior career*
Years	Team	Apps	(Gls)
1982–1984	Unirea Slobozia		
1984–1991	Rapid București	150	(43)
1991–1992	Autocar București		
1992–1993	CS Botoșani		
1993–1994	Astra Ploiești		
- * Club domestic league appearances and goals

Iosif Damaschin (born 1 September 1963) is a Romanian former footballer who played as a forward. During his period spent at Rapid București in a match from Cupa României which ended with a 3–2 loss against Steaua Bucureşti with Damaschin scoring his team's second goal, Rapid's fans suspected that Steaua was being helped to win by the referees because of the influence of Valentin Ceaușescu who was a fan of the team and son of the dictator Nicolae Ceaușescu, so the fans started to chant: "Noi vi-l dăm pe Damaschin, voi ni-l dați pe Valentin!" ( "We give you Damaschin, you give us Valentin!"). This chant was considered a rebellion against the communist authorities, which was something rare during those times.

== Honours ==
Rapid Bucureşti

- Divizia B: 1989–90
