= Ionuț Coadă =

Romanian footballer (born 1998)

Personal information
- Full name: Ionuț Viorel Coadă
- Date of birth: 1 January 1998 (age 28)
- Place of birth: Drobeta-Turnu Severin, Romania
- Height: 1.81 m (5 ft 11 in)
- Positions: Defensive midfielder; centre-back

Team information
- Current team: CSA Steaua București
- Number: 8

Youth career
- –2016: CSȘ Drobeta-Turnu Severin
- 2016–2017: UTA Arad

Senior career*
Years	Team	Apps	(Gls)
2016–2017	UTA II Arad		
2017–2021	ASU Politehnica Timișoara	71	(3)
2021–2026	Unirea Slobozia	126	(7)
2026–	CSA Steaua București	3	(0)
- * Club domestic league appearances and goals as of 16 August 2026

Ionuț Viorel Coadă (born 1 January 1998) is a Romanian professional footballer who plays as a defensive midfielder or a centre-back for Liga II club CSA Steaua București.

== Honours ==
Unirea Slobozia

- Liga II: 2023–24
