= Özkara =

Özkara is a surname. Notable people with the surname include:

- Cihan Özkara (born 1991), Azerbaijani footballer
- Hüsnü Özkara (born 1955), Turkish footballer and manager
- Ionuț Özkara (born 2000), Romanian footballer
