= Jilavele =

- Commune
- Location in Ialomița County

- Location in Romania
- Coordinates: 44°46′N 26°32′E
- Country: Romania
- County: Ialomița

Government
  - Mayor (2024–2028): Marius-Bogdan Brutaru (PSD)
- Area: 52.46 km^{2} (20.25 sq mi)
- Elevation: 55 m (180 ft)
- Population (2021-12-01): 3,045
  - Density: 58.04/km^{2} (150.3/sq mi)
- Time zone: UTC+02:00 (EET)
  - Summer (DST): UTC+03:00 (EEST)
- Postal code: 927155
- Area code: +(40) 243
- Vehicle reg.: IL
- Website: comunajilavele.ro

Jilavele is a commune located in Ialomița County, Muntenia, Romania. It is composed of two villages, Jilavele and Slătioarele.

The commune is located in the northwestern corner of the county, bordering on both Prahova County and Buzău County. It is 12.5 km (7.8 mi) from Urziceni and 63.9 km (39.7 mi) from Bucharest.

Historical population
Year	Pop.	±%
1899	2,694	—
1925	3,156	+17.1%
2002	3,791	+20.1%
2011	3,538	−6.7%
2021	3,045	−13.9%
Source: Census data

== Natives ==
- Iosif Damaschin (born 1963), footballer
