= Ion Gurău =

Romanian footballer (born 1999)

Personal information
- Full name: Ion Cristian Gurău
- Date of birth: 27 March 1999 (age 27)
- Place of birth: Brăila, Romania
- Height: 1.98 m (6 ft 6 in)
- Position: Goalkeeper

Team information
- Current team: Botoșani
- Number: 27

Youth career
- 2009–2013: Luceafărul Brăila
- 2013–2017: Gheorghe Hagi Academy

Senior career*
Years	Team	Apps	(Gls)
2017–2020	Viitorul Constanța	0	(0)
2017–2020	Viitorul II Constanța		
2017–2018	→ Farul Constanța (loan)		
2018–2019	→ Gloria Buzău (loan)		
2019	→ Daco-Getica București (loan)	3	(0)
2020–2022	Unirea Slobozia	38	(0)
2022–2025	FC U Craiova	44	(0)
2025–2026	Unirea Slobozia	10	(0)
2026	Bylis	4	(0)
2026–	Botoșani	0	(0)
- * Club domestic league appearances and goals as of 6 February 2026

Ion Cristian Gurău (born 27 March 1999) is a Romanian professional footballer who plays as a goalkeeper Liga I club Botoșani.

== Honours ==
Farul Constanța

- Liga III: 2017–18

Gloria Buzău

- Liga III: 2018–19
