= Leontin Toader =

Romanian footballer

Personal information
- Date of birth: 20 May 1964 (age 62)
- Place of birth: Urziceni, Romania
- Height: 1.82 m (6 ft 0 in)
- Position: Goalkeeper

Team information
- Current team: Rapid București (GK coach)

Youth career
- 1978–1983: Ferom Urziceni

Senior career*
Years	Team	Apps	(Gls)
1983–1984	Unirea Slobozia		
1984–1995	Rapid București (Note: The statistics for the 1989–90 Divizia B season are unavailable.)	236	(0)
1995–1997	Jiul Petroșani	62	(0)
1997–1998	Rocar București	17	(0)
Total		315	(0)

Managerial career
- 1998–1999: Național București (GK coach)
- 2000: Al Ain (GK coach)
- 2001–2002: Al Hilal (GK coach)
- 2002–2003: Al Sadd (GK coach)
- 2004–2005: Al Ahli Club (GK coach)
- 2006–2008: Kuwait (GK coach)
- 2008–2009: Al-Salmiya (GK coach)
- 2009–2010: Al-Ettifaq (GK coach)
- 2010: AEL Limassol (GK coach)
- 2011: Astra Ploiești (GK coach)
- 2012: Steaua București (GK coach)
- 2012–2014: Kuwait SC (GK coach)
- 2015–2016: Al Ahli Club (GK coach)
- 2016–2017: Qatar SC (GK coach)
- 2017–2026: Romania (GK coach)
- 2026–: Rapid București (GK Coach)
- * Club domestic league appearances and goals

Leontin Toader (born 20 May 1964) is a Romanian former professional footballer who played as a goalkeeper, currently goalkeeping coach at Liga I club Rapid București.

== Honours ==
Rapid București

- Divizia B: 1989–90
- Cupa României runner-up: 1994–95

Jiul Petroșani

- Divizia B: 1995–96
