= Máté Simon =

Romanian professional footballer

Personal information
- Date of birth: 19 July 2006 (age 20)
- Place of birth: Remetea, Romania
- Height: 1.95 m (6 ft 5 in)
- Position: Goalkeeper

Team information
- Current team: FK Csíkszereda/CSA Steaua București
- Number: 33/33

Youth career
- –2024: FK Csíkszereda

Senior career*
Years	Team	Apps	(Gls)
2024–	FK Csíkszereda	33	(0)
2026–	CSA Steaua București	10	(0)

International career^{‡}
2023	Romania U17	1	(0)
2023–2024	Romania U18	1	(0)
2024–2025	Romania U19	4	(0)
2025–	Romania U20	1	(0)
- * Club domestic league appearances and goals as of 30 October 2026 ‡ National team caps and goals as of 13 October 2025

Máté Simon (born 19 July 2006) is a Romanian professional footballer who plays as a goalkeeper for Liga I club FK Csíkszereda and for Liga II club CSA Steaua București.

== International career ==
Simon has represented Romania internationally at under-17, under-18 and under-19 level.

== Personal life ==
Born in Remetea, Harghita County, Romania, Simon is of Hungarian ethnicity.
