= Stefan Krell =

Austrian footballer (born 1992)

Personal information
- Date of birth: 12 June 1992 (age 34)
- Place of birth: Vienna, Austria
- Height: 1.89 m (6 ft 2 in)
- Position: Goalkeeper

Youth career
- –2001: SR Donaufeld Wien
- 2001–2002: Austria Wien
- 2002–2006: FC Stadlau
- 2006–2008: AKA St. Pölten

Senior career*
Years	Team	Apps	(Gls)
2008–2010	Floridsdorfer	12	(0)
2010–2012	Austria Wien II	13	(0)
2011–2012	Austria Wien	0	(0)
2012–2013	Floridsdorfer	5	(0)
2013	→ Hartberg (loan)	4	(0)
2013–2017	Parndorf	92	(0)
2017–2019	SV Horn	46	(0)
2019	→ Wacker Innsbruck (loan)	0	(0)
2019–2021	Dunărea Călărași	21	(0)
2021–2022	Sporting Roșiori		
2023–2024	Ceahlăul Piatra Neamț	32	(0)
2024–2025	Unirea Slobozia	12	(0)
2025–2026	Petrolul Ploiești	12	(0)
- * Club domestic league appearances and goals as of 25 January 2026

Stefan Krell (born 12 June 1992) is an Austrian professional footballer who plays as a goalkeeper.

== Honours ==
Parndorf

- Landesliga Burgenland: 2013–14

SV Horn

- Regionalliga Ost: 2017–18
