= Ionuț Özkara =

Romanian footballer

Personal information
- Full name: Ionuț Oktay Özkara
- Date of birth: 11 August 2000 (age 26)
- Place of birth: Bucharest, Romania
- Position: Centre back

Team information
- Current team: Voluntari

Youth career
- –2020: Voluntari

Senior career*
Years	Team	Apps	(Gls)
2020–	Voluntari	1	(0)
2021	→ Unirea Slobozia (loan)	7	(2)
- * Club domestic league appearances and goals as of 17 April 2021

Ionuț Oktay Özkara (born 11 August 2000) is a Romanian professional footballer who plays as a centre back for FC Voluntari. He made his debut in Liga I on 4 December 2020, in a match between FC Voluntari and Academica Clinceni, ended with the score of 3-3.
