= Gheorghe Tătaru =

Romanian footballer (1948–2004)

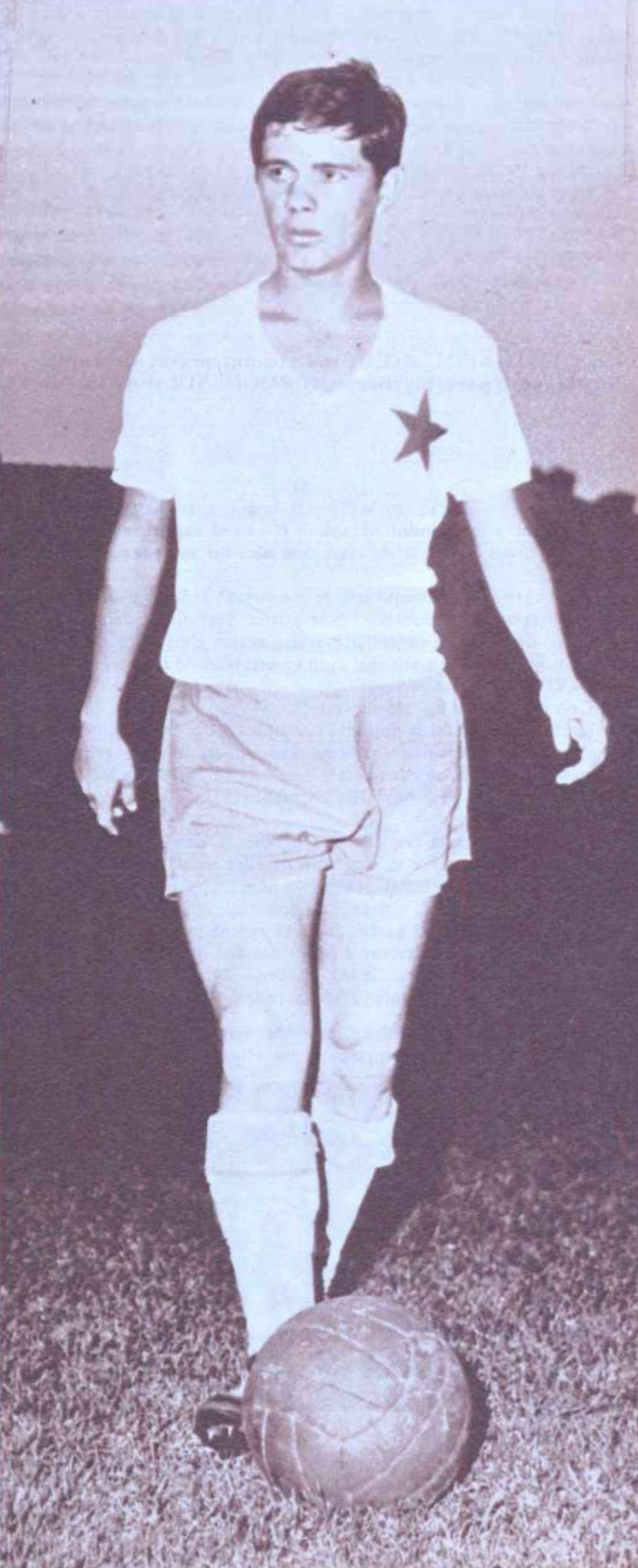

Personal information
- Date of birth: 5 May 1948
- Place of birth: București, Romanian People's Republic
- Date of death: 19 December 2004 (aged 56)
- Place of death: Iaşi, Romania
- Position: Forward

Youth career
- 1959–1967: Steaua București

Senior career*
Years	Team	Apps	(Gls)
1967–1974	Steaua București	169	(57)
1974–1975	Chimia Râmnicu Vâlcea	32	(11)
1975–1980	CS Târgovişte (Note: The statistics for the 1975–76 Divizia B season are unavailable.)	93	(30)
1981–1982	Autobuzul București		
1983–1984	Unirea Slobozia		
Total		294	(98)

International career
	Romania U21	1	(0)
	Romania U23	7	(0)
	Romania B	4	(4)
1970–1972	Romania (Note: Including four appearances and two goals for Romania's Olympic team.)	10	(3)
- * Club domestic league appearances and goals

Gheorghe Tătaru (5 May 1948 – 19 December 2004), also known as Tătaru II, was a Romanian football forward. He played seven years at Steaua București. He was the younger brother of Nicolae Tătaru, who also played professional football at Steaua București.

== Career ==
Tătaru joined the junior squad of Steaua București in 1959, being promoted to the first team in 1967. He played for Steaua București until 1974. In 1974, he signed for Chimia Râmnicu Vâlcea, and then he played for FC Târgovişte (1975–1980).

In 1980, he decided to retire from football, but one year later was called up by the Liga II team Autobuzul București. He retired again in 1982, but again received a call, this time from Unirea Slobozia. He finally called it a day in 1984.

In 1970–71 he was top scorer of Liga I.

He won six caps for the Romania national team and scored one goal. In 1970, he was part of the national team which played at the 1970 World Cup, being used in all the three games played by Romania. They were his first ever caps for Romania.

== Honours ==
Steaua București

- Divizia A: 1967–68
- Cupa României: 1968–69, 1969–70, 1970–71

CS Târgoviște

- Divizia B: 1976–77

Individual

- Divizia A top scorer: 1970–71
