= Christ Afalna =

Cameroonian footballer (born 1998)

Personal information
- Full name: Christ Nkama Afalna
- Date of birth: 15 June 1998 (age 28)
- Place of birth: Douala, Cameroon
- Height: 1.87 m (6 ft 2 in)
- Position: Striker

Team information
- Current team: Al-Jahra

Youth career
- –2018: Matelots

Senior career*
Years	Team	Apps	(Gls)
2018–2019	Matelots		
2019–2022	Șomuz Fălticeni		
2021–2022	→ Unirea Slobozia (loan)	32	(6)
2022–2026	Unirea Slobozia	110	(16)
2026	Hermannstadt	16	(2)
2026–	Al-Jahra	0	(0)
- * Club domestic league appearances and goals as of 18 May 2026

Christ Nkama Afalna (born 15 June 1998) is a Cameroonian professional footballer who plays as a striker for Kuwaiti Division One club Al-Jahra.

== Honours ==
Unirea Slobozia

- Liga II: 2023–24
