= Nacho Heras =

Spanish footballer (born 1997)

Personal information
- Full name: Ignacio Heras García
- Date of birth: 23 March 1997 (age 29)
- Place of birth: Leganés, Spain
- Height: 1.77 m (5 ft 10 in)
- Position: Forward

Team information
- Current team: Sepsi OSK
- Number: 20

Youth career
- –2012: Getafe
- 2012–2016: Atlético Madrid

Senior career*
Years	Team	Apps	(Gls)
2016–2017	Atlético Madrid B	24	(5)
2017–2019	Atlético Baleares	28	(1)
2019–2020	Leganés B	17	(7)
2020	Getafe B	4	(0)
2020–2022	Burgos B	32	(18)
2022–2023	Linense	12	(1)
2023–2024	Recreativo	30	(1)
2024–2025	CSA Steaua București	39	(13)
2025	Argeș Pitești	4	(0)
2025–	Sepsi OSK	38	(17)
- * Club domestic league appearances and goals as of 8 November 2026

Ignacio Heras García (born 23 March 1997), commonly known as Nacho Heras, is a Spanish professional footballer who plays as a forward for Liga I club Sepsi OSK.

== Club career ==
Heras made his Liga I debut for Argeș Pitești in a 0–2 home loss against Rapid București, on 11 July 2025.
