= Bruno Ventura =

Portuguese footballer

Personal information
- Full name: Bruno Santos Ventura
- Date of birth: 28 April 2001 (age 25)
- Place of birth: Lisbon, Portugal
- Height: 1.74 m (5 ft 9 in)
- Position: Midfielder

Team information
- Current team: Unirea Slobozia
- Number: 11

Youth career
- 2009–2011: Benfica
- 2011–2012: Povoense
- 2012–2014: Belenenses
- 2014–2015: Sacavenense
- 2015–2020: Vitória Setúbal

Senior career*
Years	Team	Apps	(Gls)
2020–2022	Vitória Setúbal	40	(11)
2022–2023	Rio Ave U23	11	(4)
2022–2024	Rio Ave	16	(0)
2024	→ Leixões (loan)	7	(2)
2024	Oliveirense	8	(0)
2025–2026	União Santarém	32	(5)
2026–	Unirea Slobozia	12	(4)
- * Club domestic league appearances and goals as of 31 October 2026

Bruno Santos Ventura (born 28 April 2001) is a Portuguese professional footballer who plays as a midfielder for Liga II club Unirea Slobozia.

== Professional career ==
Ventura is a youth product of Benfica, Povoense, Belenenses, Sacavenense and Vitória Setúbal. On 16 June 2020, he signed his first professional contract with Vitória Setúbal until 2022, after a strong year with the U23s. On 31 January 2022, he transferred to Rio Ave in the Primeira Liga on a contract until 2025. He made his professional debut with Rio Ave in a 2–1 Taça da Liga win over Farense on 13 December 2022.

On 31 January 2024, Rio Ave sent Ventura on loan to Liga Portugal 2 club Leixões, until the end of the 2023–24 season.

In July 2024, Ventura was signed by Liga Portugal 2 side U.D. Oliveirense.
