= Constantin Toma =

Romanian footballer (born 1987)

Personal information
- Full name: Constantin Adrian Toma
- Date of birth: 23 March 1987 (age 39)
- Place of birth: Slobozia, Romania
- Height: 1.87 m (6 ft 2 in)
- Position: Left-back

Team information
- Current team: Unirea Slobozia
- Number: 10

Youth career
- 1994–2004: Unirea Slobozia

Senior career*
Years	Team	Apps	(Gls)
2004–2015	Unirea Slobozia	61	(2)
2015	Viitorul Axintele		
2015–	Unirea Slobozia	121	(16)
- * Club domestic league appearances and goals as of 25 August 2026

Constantin Adrian Toma (born 23 March 1987) is a Romanian professional footballer who plays as a left-back for Liga II club Unirea Slobozia, which he captains.

== Honours ==
Unirea Slobozia

- Liga II: 2023–24
- Liga III: 2011–12, 2019–20
