= Andrei Dorobanțu =

Romanian professional footballer

Personal information
- Full name: Andrei Cristian Dorobanțu
- Date of birth: 29 August 2004 (age 22)
- Place of birth: Slobozia, Romania
- Height: 1.79 m (5 ft 10 in)
- Positions: Right-back; defensive midfielder

Team information
- Current team: UTA Arad (on loan from Unirea Slobozia)
- Number: 2

Youth career
- Victoria Munteni Buzău
- –2022: Unirea Slobozia

Senior career*
Years	Team	Apps	(Gls)
2021–	Unirea Slobozia	95	(5)
2026–	→ UTA Arad (loan)	10	(2)

International career^{‡}
2024–2025	Romania U20	6	(0)
2026	Romania U21	2	(0)
- * Club domestic league appearances and goals as of 18 September 2026 ‡ National team caps and goals as of 30 September 2026

Andrei Cristian Dorobanțu (born 29 August 2004) is a Romanian professional footballer who plays as a right-back or a defensive midfielder for Liga I club UTA Arad, on loan from Liga II club Unirea Slobozia.

== Career statistics ==
As of match played 18 September 2026

Appearances and goals by club, season and competition
Club	Season	League			Cupa României		Europe		Other		Total	
Club	Season	Division	Apps	Goals	Apps	Goals	Apps	Goals	Apps	Goals	Apps	Goals
Unirea Slobozia	2021–22	Liga II	7	0	1	0	—		—		8	0
Unirea Slobozia	2022–23	Liga II	17	2	4	0	—		—		21	2
Unirea Slobozia	2023–24	Liga II	22	2	0	0	—		—		24	2
Unirea Slobozia	2024–25	Liga I	19	1	1	0	—		2 (Note: Appearances in Liga I promotion/relegation play-offs)	0	22	1
Unirea Slobozia	2025–26	Liga I	30	0	1	0	—		—		31	0
Unirea Slobozia	Total		95	5	6	0	—		2	0	103	5
UTA Arad (loan)	2026–27	Liga I	10	2	1	1	—		—		11	3
Total			105	7	7	1	—		2	0	114	8

== Honours ==
Unirea Slobozia

- Liga II: 2023–24
