= Bogdan Marian =

Romanian footballer (born 2004)

Personal information
- Full name: Bogdan Nicolae Marian
- Date of birth: 4 December 2004 (age 21)
- Place of birth: Baia Mare, Romania
- Height: 1.80 m (5 ft 11 in)
- Position: Left-back

Team information
- Current team: Unirea Slobozia
- Number: 3

Youth career
- 2013–2023: Watford

Senior career*
Years	Team	Apps	(Gls)
2023	Watford	0	(0)
2023	→ Rushden & Diamonds (loan)	1	(1)
2023–2024	Voluntari II		
2024–2025	Petrolul Ploiești II		
2025–2026	Petrolul Ploiești	7	(1)
2026–	Unirea Slobozia	7	(0)
- * Club domestic league appearances and goals as of 24 October 2026

Bogdan Nicolae Marian (born 4 December 2004) is a Romanian professional footballer who plays as a left-back for Liga II club Unirea Slobozia.
