= 2019–20 Liga III =

Liga III
- Season: 2019–20
- Country: Romania
- Teams: 80
- Promoted: Aerostar Bacău; FC U Craiova; Unirea Slobozia; Slatina; Comuna Recea
- Relegated: Botoșani II; CSU Galați; Poseidon Limanu; Medgidia; Tractorul Cetate; Național Sebiș; CFR II Cluj
- Matches: 640
- Goals: 2,003 (3.13 per match)
- Biggest home win: Foresta 10–0 Pașcani
- Biggest away win: Pașcani 0–10 Liești
- Highest scoring: Foresta 10–0 Pașcani
- Longest winning run: 10 matches: Aerostar Bacău
- Longest unbeaten run: 16 matches: FC U Craiova; Unirea Slobozia
- Longest winless run: 16 matches: Pașcani; Recolta Gh. Doja
- Longest losing run: 16 matches: Pașcani
- All statistics correct as of 11 May 2020.

The 2019–20 Liga III was the 64th season of Liga III, the third tier of the Romanian football league system. The season was initially scheduled to begin on 24 August 2019 and to end on 30 May 2020.

The season was interrupted on 9 March 2020, after 16 rounds, due to the COVID-19 pandemic. After two months of inactivity, on 11 May 2020, the Romanian Football Federation announced that the season was discontinued and the best ranked teams from each series (after 16 rounds) were promoted to Liga II, only if the distance between the leader and the runner-up was bigger than 3 points. Otherwise promotion play-offs will be played between the best two teams of the series. No teams were relegated this season, apart from the clubs that were already dissolved or excluded (CSU Galați, Tractorul Cetate and Național Sebiș).

== Team changes ==
=== To Liga III ===
Promoted from Liga IV

- Blejoi
  (debut)
- CSM Bacău
  (debut)
- CSM Slatina
  (after 8 years of absence)
- CSU Galați
  (after 39 years of absence)
- Fortuna Becicherecu Mic
  (debut)
- Gilortul Târgu Cărbunești
  (after 13 years of absence)
- Hușana Huși
  (after 7 years of absence)
- Mostiștea Ulmu
  (after 7 years of absence)
- Ozana Târgu Neamț
  (after 3 years of absence)
- Poseidon Limanu
  (debut)
- Progresul Pecica
  (after 18 years of absence)
- Recolta Gh. Doja
  (debut)
- Sânmartin
  (after 4 years of absence)
- Tractorul Cetate
  (debut)
- Unirea Mirșid
  (debut)
- Viitorul Dăești
  (debut)
- Viitorul Ianca
  (after 9 years of absence)
- Viitorul Șelimbăr
  (debut)

Relegated from Liga II

- Luceafărul Oradea
  (after 3 years of absence)
- Aerostar Bacău
  (after 1 year of absence)
- ACS Poli Timișoara
  (debut)
- Balotești
  (after 5 years of absence)
- Dacia Unirea Brăila
  (after 9 years of absence)

=== From Liga III ===
Relegated to Liga IV

- Unirea Tășnad
  (ended 2-year stay)
- Sportul Chiscani
  (ended 3-year stay)
- Millenium Giarmata
  (ended 10-year stay)
- Oltenița
  (ended 4-year stay)
- MSE Târgu Mureș
  (ended 1-year stay)
- Râmnicu Sărat
  (ended 4-year stay)
- Hermannstadt II
  (ended 2-year stay)
- Gaz Metan II Mediaș
  (ended 3-year stay)
- Lugoj
  (ended 7-year stay)
- Sănătatea Darabani
  (ended 2-year stay)
- Iernut
  (ended 5-year stay)
- Ocna Mureș
  (ended 1-year stay)
- Viitorul Domnești
  (ended 9-year stay)
- Delta Dobrogea Tulcea
  (ended 5-year stay)
- Roman
  (ended 13-year stay)
- Bragadiru
  (ended 1-year stay)

Promoted to Liga II

- SCM Gloria Buzău
  (ended 1-year stay)
- Rapid București
  (ended 1-year stay)
- Turris Turnu Măgurele
  (ended 2-year stay)
- CSMȘ Reșița
  (ended 3-year stay)
- Miercurea Ciuc
  (ended 5-year stay)

=== Excluded teams ===
Avrig, CSM Târgu Mureș, Hărman and Stăruința Zagon withdrew due to financial problems.

Satu Mare was excluded by the Romanian Football Federation.

=== Teams spared from relegation ===
Energeticianul was spared from relegation to Liga III due to withdrawal of Luceafărul Oradea.

Agricola Borcea, Cetate Deva, Atletic Bradu, Pașcani and Sporting Roșiori were spared from relegation to Liga IV.

=== Renamed teams and other changes ===
Unirea Mirșid was replaced by the newly formed SCM Zalău, after an agreement between the two clubs.

Atletic Bradu was merged with Vedița Colonești. Vedița took the place of Atletic in the third tier.

=== Other teams ===
Luceafărul Oradea withdrew from Liga II after the end of the last season and was enrolled instead in the Liga III, a move made due to financial reasons.

== League tables ==
=== Seria I ===
Pos	Team	Pld	W	D	L	GF	GA	GD	Pts	Promotion or relegation
1	Aerostar Bacău (C, P)	16	14	0	2	40	10	+30	42	Promotion to Liga II
2	Foresta Suceava	16	11	2	3	44	20	+24	35	
3	Ceahlăul Piatra Neamț	16	10	3	3	34	10	+24	33	
4	Bucovina Rădăuți	16	10	2	4	35	13	+22	32	
5	Focșani	16	9	3	4	24	14	+10	30	
6	Oțelul Galați	16	9	3	4	25	20	+5	30	
7	Știința Miroslava	16	9	2	5	31	20	+11	29	
8	Ozana Târgu Neamț	16	7	2	7	30	27	+3	23	
9	Șomuz Fălticeni	16	5	5	6	20	26	−6	20	
10	Sporting Liești	16	5	4	7	24	25	−1	19	
11	KSE Târgu Secuiesc	16	4	5	7	20	22	−2	17	
12	Hușana Huși (Note: Hușana Huși, CSM Bacău and Pașcani were spared from relegation after the season was suspended due to COVID-19 pandemic.)	16	5	2	9	18	25	−7	17	Spared from relegation
13	Botoșani II (R)	16	4	4	8	23	31	−8	16 (Note: Botoșani II withdrew at the end of the season.)	Relegation to Liga IV
14	CSU Galați (R)	16	2	4	10	15	29	−14	10 (Note: CSU Galați withdrew during the winter break and lost all the matches from second part of the season by forfeit.)	Relegation to Liga IV
15	CSM Bacău	16	2	3	11	7	26	−19	9	Spared from relegation
16	Pașcani	16	0	0	16	11	83	−72	0	Spared from relegation

Updated to match(es) played on 11 May 2020. Source: FRF (in Romanian), Soccerway
Rules for classification: 1) Points; 2) Head-to-head points; 3) Head-to-head goal difference; 4) Head-to-head goals scored; 5) Head-to-head away goals scored; 6) Goal difference; 7) Goals scored.
(C) Champions; (P) Promoted; (R) Relegated

=== Season results ===
Home \ Away	AER	BOT	BUC	CEA	CSM	CSU	FOC	FOR	HUȘ	KSE	OȚE	OZA	PAȘ	LIE	ȘOM	MIR
Aerostar Bacău		3–1	3–2				0–1			5–0	2–0			3–1	1–0	2–1
Botoșani II	1–3		0–2		1–1			4–1		2–1		1–1	4–2			0–2
Bucovina Rădăuți					1–0		4–1	0–3	1–1		1–2	3–1	7–0	4–0		
Ceahlăul Piatra Neamț	0–2	4–0	1–0		3–0			5–1		3–0			7–1			2–1
CSM Bacău	0–3						0–0	0–1			0–2	1–3	2–0	1–0	0–1	
CSU Galați	0–2	2–4	0–2	0–1	2–0			2–4		0–0						2–2
Focșani		2–0		2–1		1–0			2–0		4–0	4–1		1–0	2–2	
Foresta Suceava	1–0						1–1		4–0		3–0	3–1	10–0	3–0	4–1	
Hușana Huși	1–2	2–1	0–1	0–4	3–1	3–0				0–0						3–0
KSE Târgu Secuiesc			0–1		0–0	3–0	2–0	1–1			3–4	2–1	6–0			
Oțelul Galați		1–1		0–0		2–0			2–0				3–1	0–0	3–0	2–1
Ozana Târgu Neamț	1–2			1–2		1–1	1–0		2–0		3–2			3–0	3–0	
Pașcani	0–7					1–4	0–2		1–4		1–2	2–6		0–10	0–6	
Sporting Liești		2–2		1–1		2–1		3–1	2–1						1–1	1–3
Șomuz Fălticeni		2–1	0–5	0–0	2–1	1–1			2–0	2–2						0–2
Știința Miroslava			1–1	1–0	4–0		2–1	2–3		2–0		4–1	3–2			

Updated to match(es) played on 11 May 2020. Source: FRF
Legend: Blue = home team win; Yellow = draw; Red = away team win.

=== Seria II ===
Pos	Team	Pld	W	D	L	GF	GA	GD	Pts	Promotion or relegation
1	Unirea Slobozia (O, P)	16	12	4	0	38	12	+26	40	Qualification to Promotion play-offs
2	Mostiștea Ulmu (Q)	16	11	4	1	32	10	+22	37	Qualification to Promotion play-offs
3	Afumați	16	11	3	2	52	10	+42	36	
4	Tunari	16	11	3	2	37	19	+18	36	
5	Înainte Modelu	16	8	2	6	26	29	−3	26	
6	Popești-Leordeni	16	7	4	5	24	15	+9	25	
7	Viitorul Ianca	16	8	1	7	19	20	−1	25	
8	Făurei	16	6	3	7	23	24	−1	21	
9	Agricola Borcea	16	6	3	7	35	38	−3	21	
10	Poseidon Limanu-2 Mai (R)	16	6	2	8	27	31	−4	20 (Note: Poseidon Limanu-2 Mai withdrew at the end of the season.)	Relegation to Liga IV
11	Metalul Buzău	16	6	2	8	18	23	−5	20	
12	Medgidia (R)	16	3	6	7	22	32	−10	15 (Note: Medgidia withdrew at the end of the season.)	Relegation to Liga IV
13	Axiopolis Cernavodă (Note: Axiopolis Cernavodă, Dacia Unirea Brăila, FCSB II and Recolta Gh. Doja were spared from relegation after the season was suspended due to COVID-19 pandemic.)	16	4	3	9	20	42	−22	15	Spared from relegation
14	Dacia Unirea Brăila	16	3	2	11	13	37	−24	11	Spared from relegation
15	FCSB II	16	2	4	10	18	31	−13	10	Spared from relegation
16	Recolta Gheorghe Doja	16	0	2	14	13	44	−31	2	Spared from relegation

Updated to match(es) played on 11 May 2020. Source: FRF (in Romanian), Soccerway
Rules for classification: 1) Points; 2) Head-to-head points; 3) Head-to-head goal difference; 4) Head-to-head goals scored; 5) Head-to-head away goals scored; 6) Goal difference; 7) Goals scored.
(O) Play-off winners; (P) Promoted; (Q) Qualified for the phase indicated; (R) Relegated

=== Season results ===
Home \ Away	AFU	AGR	AXI	DUB	FĂU	FCS	MOD	MED	MBZ	MOS	POP	POS	RGD	TUN	USZ	VIA
Afumați		8–1	8–0	5–0		2–0			5–1	1–2	1–0	2–0				
Agricola Borcea					2–1	2–2	0–1	6–1		2–2			3–2		0–3	3–1
Axiopolis Cernavodă				1–1		2–1	3–1		3–0		1–4	0–1			0–1	
Dacia Unirea Brăila		0–2			1–0		2–3		4–1	0–2			3–2		0–2	0–2
Făurei	1–4		3–0				2–0			1–1	1–1		3–0			3–2
FCSB II		2–2		2–1	0–3		1–2		0–0	1–2				2–4	1–3	
Înainte Modelu	1–1		3–3					2–1		2–5	1–4		3–0	3–4		1–0
Medgidia	0–6		4–1	0–0		0–0			1–2		0–0	3–3	2–0			
Metalul Buzău		1–4		5–0	0–1		0–1			0–0			3–1	0–1	0–1	
Mostiștea Ulmu	0–1		2–0					4–1			2–0	3–1		1–0		3–0
Popești-Leordeni		2–1		2–0	3–0	3–2			0–1			3–1		1–2	0–0	
Poseidon Limanu		4–2		4–1	4–1	3–2	1–2							1–1	1–4	
Recolta Gh. Doja	1–6		1–1			1–2		0–3			1–1	1–3		2–3		0–1
Tunari	1–1	3–1	5–0	4–0	3–2			1–0							3–3	2–1
Unirea Slobozia					2–0		2–0	4–4		0–0		3–0	4–1			4–1
Viitorul Ianca	0–0		3–0			1–0		2–1	1–3		1–0	2–0		1–0		

Updated to match(es) played on 11 May 2020. Source: FRF
Legend: Blue = home team win; Yellow = draw; Red = away team win.

=== Seria III ===
Pos	Team	Pld	W	D	L	GF	GA	GD	Pts	Promotion or relegation
1	Progresul Spartac București (Q)	16	11	4	1	43	9	+34	37	Qualification to Promotion play-offs
2	CSM Slatina (O, P)	16	11	4	1	34	9	+25	37	Qualification to Promotion play-offs
3	Flacăra Moreni	16	9	3	4	29	18	+11	30	
4	Alexandria	16	9	1	6	28	14	+14	28	
5	Universitatea II Craiova	16	8	3	5	30	18	+12	27	
6	Vedița Colonești	16	8	3	5	20	20	0	27	
7	Unirea Bascov	16	5	7	4	32	32	0	22	
8	Blejoi	16	6	4	6	17	18	−1	22	
9	Olimpic Cetate Râșnov	16	6	3	7	24	24	0	21	
10	Voluntari II	16	6	3	7	35	39	−4	21	
11	SR Brașov	16	5	4	7	16	26	−10	19	
12	Pucioasa (Note: Pucioasa, Astra II, Balotești and Sporting Roșiori were spared from relegation after the season was suspended due to COVID-19 pandemic.)	16	5	3	8	23	29	−6	18	Spared from relegation
13	Astra II	16	4	4	8	22	23	−1	16	Spared from relegation
14	Balotești	16	4	2	10	19	32	−13	14	Spared from relegation
15	Tractorul Cetate (R)	16	3	1	12	16	53	−37	10 (Note: Tractorul Cetate withdrew during the winter break and lost all the matches from second part of the season by forfeit.)	Relegation to Liga IV
16	Sporting Roșiori	16	2	3	11	9	33	−24	9	Spared from relegation

Updated to match(es) played on 11 May 2020. Source: FRF (in Romanian), Soccerway
Rules for classification: 1) Points; 2) Head-to-head points; 3) Head-to-head goal difference; 4) Head-to-head goals scored; 5) Head-to-head away goals scored; 6) Goal difference; 7) Goals scored.
(O) Play-off winners; (P) Promoted; (Q) Qualified for the phase indicated; (R) Relegated

=== Season results ===
Home \ Away	ALX	AST	BAL	BLJ	CSU	SLA	FLA	OCR	PRS	PUC	ROȘ	SRB	TRA	BAS	VED	VOL
Alexandria			3–1	0–0		2–0		0–1		6–0		2–0	3–0			4–2
Astra II	3–0			1–0	0–1		0–1			1–2	2–2			3–3	0–1	
Balotești		2–1		1–1	2–1	0–2					4–0	2–3		2–0		3–4
Blejoi		1–1			2–0		4–0		1–0		2–1	1–1		0–2	0–2	
CS U II Craiova	2–0		1–1				2–0	1–3	1–2	6–1			3–2		4–0	
CSM Slatina		1–0		2–0	1–0		5–1		2–2		1–0	3–0		2–0		
Flacăra Moreni	2–1		3–0					1–1	2–2	3–0			5–0		4–0	0–0
Olimpic Cetate Râșnov		1–3	2–0	3–1		0–1	1–2				3–0	3–0				1–2
Progresul Spartac București	1–0	4–0	2–0					4–1			4–1	4–0	9–0	1–1		
Pucioasa	0–2		5–0	2–0		0–0		0–0	0–0				7–1			2–3
Sporting Roșiori	0–3				0–3	0–1	1–0			0–1			1–0	1–1	1–1	
SR Brașov		2–1			1–1		0–1		0–3	1–0	2–0			0–0	2–2	
Tractorul Cetate		2–2	3–1	0–1		0–8		3–0				0–2			0–3	5–2
Unirea Bascov	2–1				2–2		1–4	4–4		4–2			5–0		3–2	1–4
Vedița Colonești	0–1		1–0			1–1		2–0	0–2	2–1			1–0			2–1
Voluntari II		0–4		2–3	1–2	3–3			0–3		5–1	3–2		3–3		

Updated to match(es) played on 11 May 2020. Source: FRF
Legend: Blue = home team win; Yellow = draw; Red = away team win.

=== Seria IV ===
Pos	Team	Pld	W	D	L	GF	GA	GD	Pts	Promotion or relegation
1	FC U Craiova (C, P)	16	13	3	0	40	9	+31	42	Promotion to Liga II
2	Șoimii Lipova	16	8	5	3	32	15	+17	29	
3	Crișul Chișineu-Criș	16	8	4	4	21	19	+2	28	
4	Flacăra Horezu	16	8	3	5	22	15	+7	27	
5	Progresul Pecica	16	7	5	4	25	18	+7	26	
6	Dumbrăvița	16	6	5	5	32	23	+9	23	
7	Hunedoara	16	7	2	7	31	31	0	23	
8	Ghiroda	16	6	3	7	29	25	+4	21	
9	Gloria Lunca-Teuz Cermei	16	5	6	5	28	29	−1	21	
10	Fortuna Becicherecu Mic	16	4	8	4	23	20	+3	20	
11	Viitorul Dăești	16	5	5	6	35	39	−4	20	
12	Cetate Deva (Note: Cetate Deva, Filiași, ACS Poli Timișoara and Gilortul Târgu Cărbunești were spared from relegation after the season was suspended due to COVID-19 pandemic.)	16	4	6	6	16	19	−3	18	Spared from relegation
13	Filiași	16	4	3	9	24	36	−12	15	Spared from relegation
14	ACS Poli Timișoara	16	4	2	10	17	35	−18	14	Spared from relegation
15	Național Sebiș (R)	16	4	2	10	20	39	−19	14 (Note: Național Sebiș withdrew during the winter break and lost all the matches from second part of the season by forfeit.)	Relegation to Liga IV
16	Gilortul Târgu Cărbunești	16	3	2	11	14	37	−23	11	Spared from relegation

Updated to match(es) played on 11 May 2020. Source: FRF (in Romanian), Soccerway
Rules for classification: 1) Points; 2) Head-to-head points; 3) Head-to-head goal difference; 4) Head-to-head goals scored; 5) Head-to-head away goals scored; 6) Goal difference; 7) Goals scored.
(C) Champions; (P) Promoted; (R) Relegated

=== Season results ===
Home \ Away	ACS	CET	CRI	DUM	FCU	FIL	HOR	FOR	GHI	GIL	GLT	HUN	SEB	PRO	LIP	VID
ACS Poli Timișoara		1–1	1–2		0–5	1–2	2–0	2–1			1–2	2–1				
Cetate Deva			0–0	1–1	0–1				0–4	2–0		1–2	1–3	3–1		
Crișul Chișineu-Criș				1–1		2–0	1–0	2–1			0–3			0–0	1–0	3–1
Dumbrăvița	2–0	1–2			1–2			0–0	1–0	6–0		3–4	3–1			
FC U Craiova			5–0				1–0		4–0	2–1	1–1		5–0	0–0	2–2	
Filiași		1–0		2–4	2–3			3–3		1–0		1–2			0–1	3–3
Flacăra Horezu		1–0		2–1		3–1		0–2				3–0	3–0		2–0	2–1
Fortuna Becicherecu Mic	1–1	0–0			0–2				2–1	3–0		2–2	1–1	2–0		
Ghiroda	5–0		2–1			4–2	1–1			3–1				0–1	2–2	2–4
Gilortul Târgu Cărbunești	4–1		0–3			1–3	1–1		1–0		1–5		2–0	0–0		
Gloria Lunca-Teuz Cermei		1–3		1–4		1–1	1–1	2–1	3–3						1–1	2–4
Hunedoara			1–2		2–4				2–0	2–0	3–1		4–2	1–2		3–3
Național Sebiș	0–3		3–2			4–2	0–2		0–2	1–1				1–2	1–5	
Progresul Pecica	3–2		1–1	1–1		4–0	3–1				1–2				1–2	5–2
Șoimii Lipova	4–0	1–1		3–0	0–1			2–2		4–1		1–0				4–0
Viitorul Dăești	2–0	1–1		3–3	0–2			2–2		4–2		4–2	1–3			

Updated to match(es) played on 11 May 2020. Source: FRF
Legend: Blue = home team win; Yellow = draw; Red = away team win.

=== Seria V ===
Pos	Team	Pld	W	D	L	GF	GA	GD	Pts	Promotion or relegation
1	Comuna Recea (O, P)	16	10	5	1	41	17	+24	35	Qualification to Promotion play-offs
2	Minaur Baia Mare (Q)	16	10	3	3	25	8	+17	33	Qualification to Promotion play-offs
3	Viitorul Șelimbăr	16	7	7	2	26	19	+7	28	
4	Metalurgistul Cugir	16	7	6	3	22	17	+5	27	
5	Luceafărul Oradea	16	8	2	6	37	29	+8	26	
6	Sânmartin	16	8	1	7	31	30	+1	25	
7	1. FC Gloria	16	7	4	5	17	19	−2	25	
8	Avântul Reghin	16	5	7	4	27	21	+6	22	
9	Sticla Arieșul Turda	16	5	7	4	19	22	−3	22	
10	Unirea Dej	16	6	3	7	19	24	−5	21	
11	Sănătatea Cluj	16	5	5	6	22	21	+1	20	
12	Unirea Alba Iulia (Note: Unirea Alba Iulia, Industria Galda, Odorheiu Secuiesc and SCM Zalău were spared from relegation after the season was suspended due to COVID-19 pandemic.)	16	4	4	8	21	22	−1	16	Spared from relegation
13	CFR Cluj-Napoca II (R)	16	4	3	9	21	35	−14	15 (Note: CFR II Cluj withdrew at the end of the season.)	Relegation to Liga IV
14	Industria Galda	16	3	2	11	19	35	−16	11	Spared from relegation
15	Odorheiu Secuiesc	16	2	4	10	11	28	−17	10	Spared from relegation
16	SCM Zalău	16	4	3	9	21	32	−11	9 (Note: SCM Zalău were deducted 6 points for organizational irregularities.)	Spared from relegation

Updated to match(es) played on 11 May 2020. Source: FRF (in Romanian), Soccerway
Rules for classification: 1) Points; 2) Head-to-head points; 3) Head-to-head goal difference; 4) Head-to-head goals scored; 5) Head-to-head away goals scored; 6) Goal difference; 7) Goals scored.
(O) Play-off winners; (P) Promoted; (Q) Qualified for the phase indicated; (R) Relegated

=== Season results ===
Home \ Away	GLO	AVÂ	CFR	REC	IND	LUC	MET	MIN	ODO	SSP	CSC	ZAL	SAT	UNI	DEJ	ȘEL
1. FC Gloria		1–1	3–2	1–0		1–0		0–1		0–2		1–0			1–0	
Avântul Reghin					2–1		1–2		1–1		0–1		1–1	1–0	3–0	1–1
CFR II Cluj		3–3			2–0		0–2		1–1				1–4	2–1	2–1	1–1
Comuna Recea		4–2	6–1		8–2		2–1		2–0					2–2	4–1	2–0
Industria Galda	0–1		3–0			2–6	0–1			0–0	0–2	5–2	0–1			
Luceafărul Oradea		2–6	2–1	3–4				1–0	3–0		1–2	3–3		3–2		0–1
Metalurgistul Cugir	3–2			1–1		0–3		1–1		0–0	2–0	3–1	3–1			
Minaur Baia Mare		0–0	2–0	1–1	2–0				2–0				6–0	1–0		5–0
Odorheiu Secuiesc	0–1	0–3			1–3		2–0			0–2	3–3	0–1	1–1			
Sănătatea Cluj	2–2	1–1	2–3	0–1		2–2		2–0						4–1		1–2
Sânmartin	3–2		2–0	1–3		3–6		1–2		3–0		3–2			5–1	
SCM Zalău		3–1	3–2	0–0		3–3		0–1		2–1					0–2	2–2
Sticla Arieșul Turda	1–1			1–1		0–1		2–1		0–1	2–1	2–1			1–1	
Unirea Alba Iulia	4–0				2–0		1–1		0–2		3–0	3–0	1–1			0–3
Unirea Dej					3–1	2–1	0–0	0–1	1–0	4–2		3–1		0–0		
Viitorul Șelimbăr	0–0				2–2		2–2		4–0		3–1		1–1	2–1	2–0	

Updated to match(es) played on 11 May 2020. Source: FRF
Legend: Blue = home team win; Yellow = draw; Red = away team win.

== Promotion play-offs ==
After the season was discontinued, the best ranked teams from each series (after 16 rounds) were promoted to Liga II, only if the distance between the leader and the runner-up was bigger than 3 points. Otherwise promotion play-offs will be played between the best two teams of the series.

Team 1	Agg.	Team 2	1st leg	2nd leg
Mostiștea Ulmu	0–4	Unirea Slobozia	0–2	0–2
Progresul Spartac	0–2	CSM Slatina	0–1	0–1
Minaur Baia Mare	3–3 (3–4 p)	Comuna Recea	2–1	1–2

5 August 2020	Mostiștea Ulmu	0–2	Unirea Slobozia	Călărași
18:00 EEST (UTC+3)		Report	Moldovan 56'; Răduca 72'	Stadium: Ion Comșa; Attendance: 0 Referee: Horia Mladinovici (Bucharest)

5 August 2020	Progresul Spartac	0–1	CSM Slatina	Bucharest
18:00 EEST (UTC+3)		Report	Gheorghe 90+4' (pen.)	Stadium: Progresul Spartac; Attendance: 0 Referee: Ionuț Coza (Cernica)

5 August 2020	Minaur Baia Mare	2–1	Comuna Recea	Baia Mare
18:00 EEST (UTC+3)	Bud 16'; Lemac 67'	Report	Bota 86' (pen.)	Stadium: Viorel Mateianu; Attendance: 0 Referee: Florin Andrei (Târgu Mureș)

9 August 2020	Unirea Slobozia	2–0	Mostiștea Ulmu	Slobozia
17:30 EEST (UTC+3)	Toma 15' (pen.); Toma 50' (pen.)	Report		Stadium: 1 Mai; Attendance: 0 Referee: Sorin Costreie (Buftea)

9 August 2020	CSM Slatina	1–0	Progresul Spartac	Slatina
17:30 EEST (UTC+3)	Manea 65'	Report		Stadium: 1 Mai; Attendance: 0 Referee: Sebastian Colțescu (Craiova)

9 August 2020	Comuna Recea	2–1 (a.e.t.) (4–3 p)	Minaur Baia Mare	Recea
17:30 EEST (UTC+3)	Mărieș 11'; Oiță 45+1'	Report	Batin 32'	Stadium: Central; Attendance: 0 Referee: Horațiu Feșnic (Cluj-Napoca)
