= 2023–24 Liga II =

Liga II
- Season: 2023–24
- Champions: Unirea Slobozia
- Promoted: Gloria Buzău; Unirea Slobozia
- Relegated: Alexandria; Progresul Spartac București; Tunari; Unirea Dej
- Europa League: Corvinul Hunedoara
- All statistics correct as of 16 May 2023.

The 2023–24 Liga II (also known as Liga 2 Casa Pariurilor for sponsorship reasons) was the 84th season of Liga II, the second tier of the Romanian football league system, and the eighth consecutive season held in a single series. It began on 5 August 2023 and ended on 27 May 2024.

The format from the previous season was maintained. The regular season was contested in a single round-robin tournament. The top six teams at the end of the regular season advanced to the promotion play-offs. The first two teams in the play-offs were promoted to Liga I, while the third- and fourth-placed teams played promotion/relegation play-offs against the 13th- and 14th-placed teams from Liga I.

The remaining fourteen teams competed in the relegation play-outs, divided into two groups. The last two teams from each group were relegated to Liga III.

== Teams ==
=== Team changes ===
To Liga II

Relegated from Liga I

- Argeș Pitești – returned after three years in the top flight.
- Chindia Târgoviște – returned after four years in the top flight.
- Mioveni – returned after two years in the top flight.

Promoted from Liga III

- Ceahlăul Piatra Neamț – returned after seven years of absence.
- Tunari – debut.
- Alexandria – returned after eighteen years of absence.
- Reșița – returned after two years of absence.
- Corvinul Hunedoara – returned after fifteen years of absence.

From Liga II

Promoted to Liga I

- Politehnica Iași – ended a two-year stay..
- Oțelul Galați – ended a one-year stay.
- Dinamo București – ended a one-year stay.

Relegated to Liga III

- Minaur Baia Mare – ended a one-year stay.
- Unirea Constanța – ended a two-year stay.
- Politehnica Timișoara – ended a seven-year stay.
- Ripensia Timișoara – ended a six-year stay.

Other changes

- FC Brașov was excluded after failing to obtain a Liga II license.
- Progresul Spartac București was spared from relegation due to FC Brașov’s exclusion.

=== Stadiums and locations ===
Locations of the 2023–24 Liga II teams
Location of Bucharest and Ilfov teams.

Club	City	Stadium	Capacity
Ceahlăul Piatra Neamț	Piatra Neamț	Ceahlăul	18,000
Chindia Târgoviște	Târgoviște	Eugen Popescu	6,000
Concordia Chiajna	Chiajna	Concordia	5,123
Corvinul Hunedoara	Hunedoara	Michael Klein	16,500
Csíkszereda Miercurea Ciuc	Miercurea Ciuc	Municipal	2,000
CS Mioveni	Mioveni	Orășenesc	10,000
CS Tunari	Tunari	Comunal	1,700
CSC 1599 Șelimbăr	Șelimbăr	Municipal (Note: CSC 1599 Șelimbăr was relocated to Municipal Stadium in Râmnicu Vâlcea, as Comunal Stadium in Șelimbăr is under renovations.)	12,000
CSC Dumbrăvița	Dumbrăvița	Ștefan Dobay	1,000
CSM Alexandria	Alexandria	Municipal (Note: CSM Alexandria was relocated to Municipal Stadium in Turnu Măgurele, as Municipal Stadium in Alexandria is under reconstruction.)	4,000
CSM Reșița	Reșița	Mircea Chivu	12,000
CSM Slatina	Slatina	1 Mai	11,390
FC Argeș Pitești	Pitești	Nicolae Dobrin	15,000
Gloria Buzău	Buzău	Municipal	12,321
Metaloglobus București	București	Metaloglobus	1,000
Progresul Spartac București	București	CNAF (Note: Progresul Spartac București was relocated to CNAF Stadium in Buftea, as Progresul Spartac Stadium in Bucharest did not meet the standards for the second tier.)	1,600
Steaua București	București	Steaua	31,254
Unirea Dej	Dej	Unirea	6,000
Unirea Slobozia	Slobozia	1 Mai	6,000
Viitorul Pandurii Târgu Jiu	Târgu Jiu	Tudor Vladimirescu	12,518

=== Personnel and kits ===
Note: Flags indicate national team as has been defined under FIFA eligibility rules. Players and Managers may hold more than one non-FIFA nationality.

Team	Manager	Captain	Kit manufacturer	Shirt sponsor
Alexandria	(Romania) Sorin Albeanu	(Romania) Dragoș Balauru	Peak Sport Products	Primăria Alexandria
Argeș Pitești	(Romania) Eugen Neagoe	(Romania) Costinel Tofan	Macron	Getica 95
Ceahlăul Piatra Neamț	(Romania) Cristian Pustai	(Albania) Azdren Llullaku	Masita	SSAB Impex
Chindia Târgoviște	(Italy) Diego Longo	(Romania) Cornel Dinu	Macron	—
Concordia Chiajna	(Romania) Ilie Poenaru	(Romania) Gabriel Torje	Joma	—
Corvinul Hunedoara	(Romania) Florin Maxim	(Romania) Alexandru Neacșa	Joma	Prodesign, ArcelorMittal
Csíkszereda Miercurea Ciuc	(Romania) Róbert Ilyés	(Hungary) Dávid Kelemen	2Rule	Csíkszereda, MOL
Dumbrăvița	(Romania) Cosmin Stan	(Romania) Costel Zurbagiu	Macron	Artoil
Gloria Buzău	(Romania) Andrei Prepeliță	(Romania) Cristian Dumitru	Joma	Superbet, Getica 95
Metaloglobus București	(Romania) Ianis Zicu	(Romania) Georgian Honciu	Jako	—
Mioveni	(Romania) Constantin Schumacher	(Romania) Daniel Șerbănică	Macron	—
Progresul Spartac București	(Romania) Andrei Erimia	(Romania) Dănilă Parfeon	Team	Kulterra
Reșița	(Romania) Flavius Stoican	(Romania) Alin Dudea	Puma	Invest in Reșița
Slatina	(Romania) Daniel Oprescu	(Romania) Cătălin Doman	Macron	Primăria Slatina
Steaua București	(Romania) Daniel Oprița	(Romania) Bogdan Chipirliu	Adidas	Get's Bet
Șelimbăr	(Romania) Claudiu Niculescu	(Romania) Ciprian Natea	Nike	Shopping City Sibiu
Tunari	(Romania) Dan Alexa	(North Macedonia) Mirko Ivanovski	Nike	Pinum
Unirea Dej	(Romania) Dragoș Militaru	(Romania) Mihai Kereki	Hummel	Dendiarom
Unirea Slobozia	(Romania) Adrian Mihalcea	(Romania) Constantin Toma	Joma	Consiliul Județean Ialomița
Viitorul Pandurii Târgu Jiu	(Romania) Călin Cojocaru	(Croatia) Arian Mršulja	Nike	Târg Auto OLTENIA

=== Managerial changes ===
==== Pre-season ====
Team	Outgoing manager	Manner of departure	Date of vacancy	Incoming manager	Date of appointment
Unirea Slobozia	(Romania) Enache Costea	Assistant manager	31 May 2023	(Romania) Adrian Mihalcea	1 July 2023
Mioveni	(Romania) Vlad Țăranu	End of tenure as a caretaker	31 May 2023	(Romania) Constantin Schumacher	1 July 2023
Chindia Târgoviște	(Romania) Anton Petrea	End of contract	31 May 2023	(Romania) Dragoș Militaru	1 July 2023
Concordia Chiajna	(Romania) Eugen Trică	End of contract	31 May 2023	(Romania) Erik Lincar	1 July 2023
Unirea Dej	(Romania) Dragoș Militaru	End of contract	31 May 2023	(Romania) Dacian Nastai	1 July 2023
Argeș Pitești	(Romania) Bogdan Vintilă	Mutual agreement	8 June 2023	(Romania) Alexandru Pelici	1 July 2023
Tunari	(Romania) Gabriel Manu	Mutual agreement	14 June 2023	(Romania) Florin Stângă	1 July 2023
Gloria Buzău	(Romania) Adrian Mihalcea	End of contract	30 June 2023	(Romania) Andrei Prepeliță	1 July 2023

==== During the season ====
Team	Outgoing manager	Manner	Date of vacancy	Position in table		Replaced by	Date of appointment
Team	Outgoing manager	Manner	Date of vacancy	Round	Position	Replaced by	Date of appointment
Reșița	(Romania) Călin Cheregi	Resigned	17 August 2023	2nd	20th	(Romania) Flavius Stoican	22 August 2023
Metaloglobus București	(Romania) Eusebiu Tudor	Resigned	29 August 2023	4th	18th	(Romania) Ianis Zicu	11 September 2023
Tunari	(Romania) Florin Stângă	Resigned	18 September 2023	6th	19th	(Romania) Alin Ilin (Interim)	18 September 2023
Alexandria	(Romania) Ștefan Odoroabă	Sacked	18 September 2023	7th	18th	(Romania) Alin Pânzaru	18 September 2023
Tunari	(Romania) Alin Ilin	End of interim spell	2 October 2023	9th	17th	(Romania) Ștefan Odoroabă	2 October 2023
Alexandria	(Romania) Alin Pânzaru	Sacked	5 December 2023	15th	19th	(Romania) Eugen Trică	21 December 2023
Concordia Chiajna	(Romania) Erik Lincar	Mutual consent	5 March 2024	12th	17th	(Romania) Ilie Poenaru	14 March 2024
Tunari	(Romania) Ștefan Odoroabă	Mutual consent	18 March 2024	19th	17th	(Romania) Dan Alexa	18 March 2024
Alexandria	(Romania) Eugen Trică	Sacked	5 April 2024	1st (play-out)	7th (play-out)	(Romania) Sorin Albeanu	5 April 2024

== Regular season ==
=== League table ===
Pos	Team	Pld	W	D	L	GF	GA	GD	Pts	Promotion or relegation
1	1599 Șelimbăr	19	12	6	1	23	9	+14	42	Qualification for Promotion play-off
2	Unirea Slobozia	19	12	4	3	22	8	+14	40	Qualification for Promotion play-off
3	Corvinul Hunedoara	19	11	4	4	30	16	+14	37	Qualification for Promotion play-off
4	Gloria Buzău	19	10	4	5	31	21	+10	34	Qualification for Promotion play-off
5	Mioveni	19	9	6	4	20	9	+11	33	Qualification for Promotion play-off
6	Csíkszereda Miercurea Ciuc	19	9	5	5	19	14	+5	32	Qualification for Promotion play-off
7	Ceahlăul Piatra Neamț	19	9	4	6	30	17	+13	31	Qualification for Relegation play-out
8	Steaua București	19	7	7	5	37	24	+13	28	Qualification for Relegation play-out
9	Chindia Târgoviște	19	7	7	5	27	14	+13	28	Qualification for Relegation play-out
10	Reșița	19	7	6	6	28	25	+3	27	Qualification for Relegation play-out
11	Metaloglobus București	19	6	8	5	20	22	−2	26	Qualification for Relegation play-out
12	Concordia Chiajna	19	6	7	6	24	18	+6	25	Qualification for Relegation play-out
13	Slatina	19	6	7	6	16	18	−2	25	Qualification for Relegation play-out
14	Argeș Pitești	19	6	6	7	17	16	+1	24	Qualification for Relegation play-out
15	Dumbrăvița	19	6	5	8	19	22	−3	23	Qualification for Relegation play-out
16	Viitorul Pandurii Târgu Jiu	19	5	8	6	16	28	−12	23	Qualification for Relegation play-out
17	Tunari	19	3	7	9	16	32	−16	16	Qualification for Relegation play-out
18	Unirea Dej	19	4	1	14	13	35	−22	13	Qualification for Relegation play-out
19	Alexandria	19	2	3	14	10	29	−19	9	Qualification for Relegation play-out
20	Progresul Spartac București	19	0	1	18	9	50	−41	1	Qualification for Relegation play-out

Source: FRF (in Romanian)
Rules for classification: During Season: 1) Points, 2) Goal difference, 3) Goals scored. End of Season: 1) Points, 2) Head-to-head points, 3) Head-to-head goal difference, 4) Goal difference, 5) Goals scored

=== Results ===
Home \ Away	ȘEL	USZ	COR	GBZ	MIO	CSI	CEA	STE	CHI	RES	MET	CON	SLA	ARG	DUM	VTJ	TUN	UDJ	ALX	PRS
1599 Șelimbăr		0–1		2–1	1–0			3–2	2–1	2–2					1–0			2–0		2–1
Unirea Slobozia			3–1	0–1		0–1	2–1	1–0			2–0					1–1	3–1		1–0	
Corvinul Hunedoara	0–0				0–2	2–0	2–1		2–1	2–0		2–2	3–0	2–0				4–0		
Gloria Buzău			2–1			0–2	1–1	4–4			1–0			0–2		5–0	2–1		1–0	
Mioveni		1–1		0–0				2–0		2–1	0–2	1–1			0–1		4–0		1–0	3–1
Csíkszereda Miercurea Ciuc	1–2				0–0		2–0		1–0	1–1		0–3	1–0	2–1				1–0		3–0
Ceahlăul Piatra Neamț	0–0				0–1				1–1	4–0			4–0	2–0	2–0			1–0		4–0
Steaua București			0–1			1–0	3–1				1–1		1–1	3–1		5–0	2–1		1–1	
Chindia Târgoviște		0–1		1–1	0–2			1–1		4–1	0–0	1–1			4–0				3–0	3–0
Reșița		0–1		2–0				3–1			5–0	3–2			2–1	1–1	1–1		3–1	0–0
Metaloglobus București	0–1		1–2			0–0	2–1					2–0	1–1	1–1		2–1	3–3	2–1		
Concordia Chiajna	0–1	0–0		1–0			1–2	0–0					1–0	1–0	0–2				0–1	
Slatina	0–0	1–0		1–2	0–0				0–0	0–0					3–0			1–2		1–0
Argeș Pitești	0–0	0–1			0–0				0–2	1–0			1–1		2–0			2–0		1–0
Dumbrăvița		0–2	0–0	0–1		1–1		0–0			1–1					1–1	6–1		2–0	
Viitorul Pandurii Târgu Jiu	0–3		2–1		1–0	1–1	0–2		0–0			2–2	1–2	0–0				2–1		
Tunari	0–0		1–1			1–0	0–1		0–2			1–1	1–3	1–1		0–0		0–1		
Unirea Dej		0–0		2–4	0–1			2–6	1–3	1–3		0–2			0–1				1–0	1–0
Alexandria	0–1		0–2			1–2	2–2				1–1		0–1	0–4		0–1	0–1			
Progresul Spartac București		0–2	1–2	1–5				1–6			0–1	0–6			1–3	1–2	1–2		1–3	

Source: FRF
Legend: Blue = home team win; Yellow = draw; Red = away team win.

== Promotion play-off ==
A promotion play-off tournament between the best 6 teams (after 19 rounds) will be played to decide the two teams that will be promoted to Liga I, meanwhile the third-placed and fourth-placed teams would play another play-off match against the 13th-placed and 14th-placed teams from Liga I. The teams will start the promotion play-offs with all the points accumulated in the regular season.

=== Play-off table ===
Pos	Team	Pld	W	D	L	GF	GA	GD	Pts	Promotion or qualification
1	Unirea Slobozia (P, C)	10	6	2	2	9	6	+3	60	Promotion to Liga I
2	Corvinul Hunedoara (Note: Corvinul Hunedoara and 1599 Șelimbăr are ineligible for promotion due to the clubs being owned by comunal departments/entities, all Liga I clubs are required to be privately owned.)	10	4	3	3	14	11	+3	52	Qualification for Europa League first qualifying round (Note: Corvinul Hunedoara qualified for the Europa League first qualifying round as 2023–24 Cupa României winners.)
3	1599 Șelimbăr	10	1	6	3	8	12	−4	51 (Note: 1599 Șelimbăr finished ahead of Gloria Buzău on regular season points: 1599 Șelimbăr 42, Gloria Buzău 34.)	
4	Gloria Buzău (P)	10	4	5	1	12	7	+5	51	Promotion to Liga I
5	Mioveni (Q)	10	2	4	4	10	11	−1	43	Qualification for play-offs
6	Csíkszereda Miercurea Ciuc (Q)	10	2	2	6	9	15	−6	40	Qualification for play-offs

Source: FRF
Rules for classification: 1) Points; 2) Points in the regular season; 3) Head-to-head points; 4) Head-to-head goal difference; 5) Head-to-head goals scored; 6) Head-to-head away goals scored; 7) Goal difference (regular season + play off); 8) Goals scored (regular season + play off); 9) Play-off.
(C) Champions; (P) Promoted; (Q) Qualified for the phase indicated

=== Play-off results ===
Home \ Away	ȘEL	COR	CSI	GBZ	MIO	USZ
1599 Șelimbăr		0–0	2–2	2–1	2–2	1–2
Corvinul Hunedoara	3–1		3–1	1–1	2–0	1–0
Csíkszereda Miercurea Ciuc	2–0	2–1		0–1	1–1	0–1
Gloria Buzău	0–0	2–2	1–0		1–0	3–0
Mioveni	0–0	3–1	3–1	1–1		0–1
Unirea Slobozia	0–0	1–0	2–0	1–1	1–0	

Source: FRF
Legend: Blue = home team win; Yellow = draw; Red = away team win.

== Relegation play-out ==
A relegation play-out tournament between the last 14 ranked teams at the end of the regular season was played to decide the five teams that will be relegated to Liga III. Two play-out groups were made: the first group consisted of teams ranked 7, 10, 11, 14, 15, 18 and 19, and the second group consisted of teams ranked 8, 9, 12, 13, 16, 17 and 20, at the end of the regular season. The teams started the relegation play-out with all the points accumulated in the regular season. Two teams from each group were relegated to Liga III.

=== Group A ===
Table

Pos	Team	Pld	W	D	L	GF	GA	GD	Pts	Qualification or relegation
1	Reșița	6	4	1	1	11	7	+4	40	
2	Ceahlăul Piatra Neamț	6	1	2	3	10	11	−1	36	
3	Metaloglobus București	6	2	2	2	6	5	+1	34 (Note: Metaloglobus București finished ahead of Argeș on regular season points tally: Metaloglobus București 26, Argeș 24.)	
4	Argeș Pitești	6	3	1	2	8	4	+4	34	
5	Dumbrăvița	6	1	1	4	3	9	−6	27 (Note: Dumbrăvița finished ahead of Unirea Dej on regular season points tally: Dumbrăvița 23, Unirea Dej 13.)	
6	Unirea Dej (R)	6	4	2	0	7	2	+5	27	Relegation to 2024–25 Liga III
7	Alexandria (R)	6	1	1	4	5	12	−7	13	Relegation to 2024–25 Liga III

Source: FRF
Rules for classification: 1) Points; 2) Points in the regular season; 3) Head-to-head points; 4) Head-to-head goal difference; 5) Head-to-head goals scored; 6) Head-to-head away goals scored; 7) Goal difference (regular season + play out); 8) Goals scored (regular season + play out); 9) Play-off.
(R) Relegated

=== Group B ===
Table

Pos	Team	Pld	W	D	L	GF	GA	GD	Pts	Qualification or relegation
1	Steaua București	6	5	1	0	12	2	+10	44	
2	Chindia Târgoviște	6	3	1	2	8	4	+4	38 (Note: Chindia Târgoviște finished ahead of Concordia Chiajna on regular season points tally: Chindia Târgoviște 28, Concordia Chiajna 25.)	
3	Concordia Chiajna	6	4	1	1	8	6	+2	38	
4	Slatina	6	2	1	3	0	0	0	32	
5	Viitorul Pandurii Târgu Jiu	6	2	1	3	6	8	−2	30	
6	Tunari (R)	6	1	1	4	8	12	−4	20	Relegation to 2024–25 Liga III
7	Progresul Spartac București (R)	6	1	0	5	5	15	−10	4	Relegation to 2024–25 Liga III

Source: FRF
Rules for classification: 1) Points; 2) Points in the regular season; 3) Head-to-head points; 4) Head-to-head goal difference; 5) Head-to-head goals scored; 6) Head-to-head away goals scored; 7) Goal difference (regular season + play out); 8) Goals scored (regular season + play out); 9) Play-off.
(R) Relegated

== Season statistics ==
Regular season, promotion play-off and relegation play-out overall statistics

As of 11 May 2024

=== Top scorers ===
Rank	Player	Club	Regular	Play-off	Play-out	Total
1	(Romania) Bogdan Chipirliu	Steaua București	12	0	2	14
2	(Romania) Marian Drăghiceanu	Reșița	8	0	5	13
3	(Romania) Adrian Bălan	Concordia Chiajna	10	0	1	11
3	(Romania) Dragoș Huiban	Metaloglobus București	10	0	1	11
4	(Romania) Marius Coman	Corvinul Hunedoara	7	3	0	10
5	(Romania) Alexandru Gîrbiță	Viitorul Pandurii Târgu Jiu	7	0	2	9
5	(Hungary) Richárd Jelena	Csíkszereda Miercurea Ciuc	5	4	0	9
6	(Romania) Dragan Paulevici	Dumbrăvița	7	0	1	8
6	(Romania) Adi Chică-Roșă	Gloria Buzău	5	3	0	8
6	(Croatia) Ante Živković	Chindia Târgoviște	4	0	4	8
7	(Romania) Cristian Dumitru	Gloria Buzău	6	1	0	7
7	(Romania) Ștefan Blănaru	Mioveni	3	4	0	7
7	(Romania) Patrick Petre	Ceahlăul Piatra Neamț	5	0	2	7
7	(North Macedonia) Mirko Ivanovski	Tunari	5	0	2	7
7	(Cameroon) Christ Afalna	Unirea Slobozia	3	4	0	7
8	(Romania) Robert Moldoveanu	Chindia Târgoviște	6	0	0	6
8	(Spain) Nacho Heras	Steaua București	3	0	3	6

== See also ==
- 2023–24 Liga I
- 2023–24 Liga III
- 2023–24 Liga IV
- 2023–24 Cupa României
