= Daniel Șerbănică =

Romanian footballer

Personal information
- Full name: Daniel Marius Șerbănică
- Date of birth: 25 June 1996 (age 30)
- Place of birth: Pitești, Romania
- Height: 1.81 m (5 ft 11 in)
- Position: Defender

Team information
- Current team: CSM Slatina
- Number: 30

Youth career
- –2013: CSC Suseni
- 2013–2015: Atletic Bradu

Senior career*
Years	Team	Apps	(Gls)
2015	Atletic Bradu	23	(4)
2016–2021	Argeș Pitești	122	(4)
2021–2024	Mioveni	89	(2)
2024–2026	Unirea Slobozia	54	(4)
2026–	CSM Slatina	12	(0)
- * Club domestic league appearances and goals as of 1 November 2026

Daniel Marius Șerbănică (born 25 June 1996) is a Romanian professional footballer who plays as a defender for Liga II club CSM Slatina.

== Honours ==
SCM Pitești

- Liga III: 2016–17
