= May 1 Stadium (Slobozia) =

Multi-use stadium in Slobozia, Romania

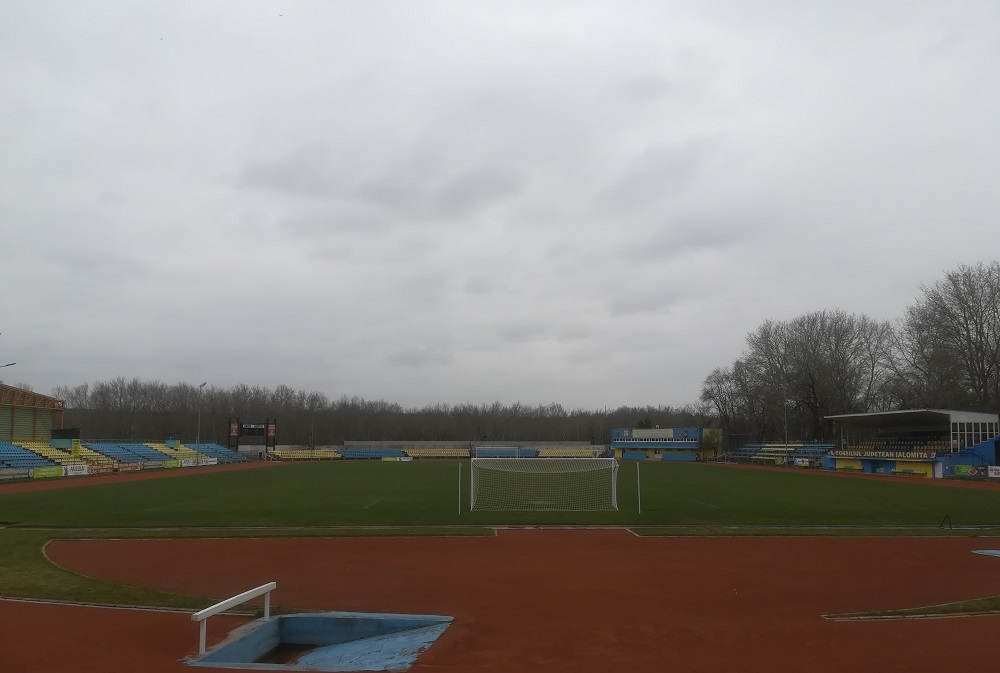
- Interactive map of May 1 Stadium
- Address: Bld. Matei Basarab
- Location: Slobozia, Romania
- Coordinates: 44°33′38.0″N 27°22′21.8″E
- Owner: Municipality of Slobozia
- Operator: Unirea Slobozia
- Capacity: 6,000 seated
- Surface: Grass

Construction
- Opened: 1950s

Tenant
- Unirea Slobozia (1955–present)

The May 1 Stadium (Romanian: Stadionul 1 Mai) is a multi-use stadium in Slobozia, Ialomița County. It is currently used mostly for football matches and is the home ground of Unirea Slobozia. It holds 6,000 people, all on seats.
