= AFC Unirea Slobozia =

Association football club in Slobozia

Unirea Slobozia
- Full name: Asociația Fotbal Club Unirea 04 Slobozia
- Nicknames: Galben-albaștrii (The Yellow-Blues); Slobozenii (The People from Slobozia); Ialomițenii (The People from Ialomița)
- Short name: Unirea
- Founded: 1955; 71 years ago as Combil Slobozia; 2004; 22 years ago (refounded) as Unirea 04 Slobozia
- Ground: 1 Mai
- Capacity: 6,000
- Owners: Slobozia Municipality; Ialomița County Council
- Chairman: Ilie Lemnaru
- Head coach: Ilie Poenaru
- League: Liga II
- 2025–26: Liga I, 15th of 16 (relegated)
- Website: afcunireaslobozia.com
Home colours	Away colours	Third colours

Asociația Fotbal Club Unirea 04 Slobozia, (Romanian pronunciation: [uˈnire̯a sloboˈzi.a]), commonly known as Unirea Slobozia or simply as Unirea, is a Romanian professional football club based in Slobozia, Ialomița County, which competes in Liga II, the second tier of Romanian football.

The team was founded in 1955 and reestablished in 2004, being for the most part of its history a participant in the third division of the Romanian football. Unirea Slobozia has also spent several seasons in the second division, first in the early 1980s and then between 2012 and 2015, when also obtained 3rd place, the best ranking in the competition until then. Unirea promoted for the first time in history in first division at the end of the 2023–24 season.

"The Yellow-Blues" play their home games at the Stadionul 1 Mai, which can host 6,000 spectators.

== History ==
Unirea Slobozia was founded in 1955 under the name Combil Slobozia, initially under the patronage of the local Ialomița combine for the production and industrialisation of pork meat. The club spent its first fifteen seasons in the regional and county championships, during which it competed under several names, including Avântul, Voința and Energia.

In the 1969–70 season, Energia earned promotion to Divizia C after winning the Ialomița County Championship and defeating ITA București, the Bucharest Municipal champions, in the promotion play-off, drawing 0–0 at home and winning 2–1 away.

Meanwhile, the club was taken over by the Amonil chemical fertiliser combine and, following promotion to the third division, was renamed Azotul Slobozia. The club spent most of the 1970s as a mid-table Divizia C side, finishing 6th in Series III in 1970–71, 8th in Series V in 1971–72, 4th in 1972–73, 8th in 1973–74, 3rd in both 1974–75 and 1975–76, and 7th in 1976–77. After moving to Series IV, Azotul finished 5th in 1977–78 and 2nd in 1978–79. The club was renamed Amonil Slobozia in 1979 and continued in Divizia C, finishing 2nd in 1979–80, 9th in 1980–81 and 7th in Series V in 1981–82.

In the summer of 1982, the club was renamed Unirea Slobozia. Under the guidance of Ion Păciulete, Unirea won Series IV of the 1982–83 Divizia C and earned promotion to Divizia B for the first time. The squad included Soare, Ionescu, Tache, Drăguț, Cristea, Borș, Gogan, Mateiu, N. Nicolae, Gh. Nicolae, Lazăr, Lupu, Păun, Liviu, Vintilă, Constantinescu and Damaschin.

In its first season in the second division, Unirea strengthened its squad with players such as Gheorghe Tătaru, who also served as player-coach, alongside Toader, Niță, Jercălău, Ene, Hadadea, Marchidan, Petrescu and Simionov. However, the team endured a difficult campaign, finishing 17th and being relegated back to Divizia C. Following its return to the third division, the club struggled to recover and finished 11th out of 16 teams in 1984–85, level on points with four other clubs and surviving on goal difference.

Unirea earned promotion back to Divizia B at the end of the 1985–86 season, pulling clear during the final two rounds following a close battle with Sportul 30 Decembrie. The team, managed by Constantin Dinu, included Soare, Suciu, Șoltuz, Drăguț, Gogan, Cristea, Țanicoiu, Ene, Iordache, Dumitru, Lupu, Constantin, who scored 34 goals, Vintilă, Păun and Dănilă.

In the 1986–87 season, Unirea was managed by Nicolae Dumitru during the first part of the campaign and Emanoil Hașoti during the second. Reinforced by players such as Istrate, Dinu, Cîrîc, Mihale, Gache, Prepeliță, Roșu, Bătrâneanu and Mustacă, the club finished 7th in Series I. Its stay in the second tier lasted only two seasons, as Ialomițenii finished 16th in 1987–88 and were relegated to Divizia C.

Promotion was immediate. Under Constantin Prepeliță as player-coach during the first part of the season and Vasile Dobrău during the second, Unirea won Series IV of Divizia C in the 1988–89 campaign. Slobozenii also reached the quarter-finals of the 1988–89 Cupa României, eliminating two first-division teams, Universitatea Cluj 1–0 in the first round and Bihor Oradea 2–0 in the second round, before losing 1–3 to Steaua București. The squad included Istrate, Matei, Drăguț, Țanicoiu, Cîrîc, Nedelciu, Iordache, Ioniță, Paraschiv, Prepeliță, Proșteanu, Vlase, Mîndru, Vintilă, Piștalu, Costin, Iovănescu and Constantin.

In Divizia B, Unirea competed in Series I, finishing 13th in 1989–90, just one point above the relegation zone, followed by 8th place in 1990–91 and 9th in 1991–92. However, the 1992–93 season ended with the club in last place out of 18 teams, resulting in relegation after four seasons in the second division.

In the summer of 1993, the club was renamed ASA 93 Slobozia and competed in Series II of the 1993–94 Divizia C, finishing 19th out of 20 teams and being relegated to the Ialomița County Championship. After reverting to the name Unirea Slobozia, the club won the Divizia D Ialomița title in the 1997–98 season and defeated Șantierul Naval Tulcea, the Tulcea County champions, 2–0 in the promotion play-off, returning to the third division after a four-year absence.

In Divizia C, Unirea competed in Series II, finishing 12th in 1998–99 and 14th in 1999–2000. However, the club encountered financial problems in the early 2000s and withdrew after the first half of the 2000–01 season, being subsequently dissolved.

Former logo, used until 2024.

The club was re-founded in 2004 as AFC Unirea 04 Slobozia and secured a place in the 2005–06 Divizia C, finishing 7th in Series II. It followed this with 6th place in 2006–07, 8th in 2007–08, 4th in 2008–09 under Marian Catană and 3rd in 2009–10, a campaign in which Ion Răuță was replaced by Constantin Prepeliță towards the end of the season.

Under Prepeliță, the Yellow and Blues reached the fifth round of the 2010–11 Cupa României, where they were eliminated 3–4 on penalties by Viitorul Constanța, and finished as runners-up in 2010–11, one point behind Callatis Mangalia. Viorel Gheorghe finished as the series' top scorer with 23 goals, as Unirea achieved its best league finish in nineteen years.

In the 2011–12 season, Constantin Prepeliță was appointed general director, while Ion Ionescu took over as head coach. Unirea won its series and secured promotion to Liga II three rounds before the end of the season. The squad included Dobre, Oprea, Judeanu, Lazăr, Stan, Roșu, Bozean, V. Toma, Cristian, Sescioreanu, Soare, Macare, Cristea, Ivașcă, Drăguț, C. Toma, Ibrian, Tudor, Patrianca, V. Gheorghe, T. Gheorghe, Zevedei, Stanciu, Ștefan and Anghel.

Ahead of the 2012–13 season, Ion Ionescu was replaced by Marin Dună as head coach. Among the club's signings was Adrian Mihalcea, who was approaching the end of his playing career and was regarded as one of the most prominent products of Slobozia football. Dună led Unirea to the fourth round of the 2012–13 Cupa României, where it was eliminated 1–3 by Săgeata Năvodari, and to a 7th-place finish in Series I of Liga II.

In 2013, Adrian Mihalcea ended his playing career and became Unirea Slobozia's head coach. He led the club to a 2nd-place finish in the regular season of Series I in the 2013–14 campaign, followed by 3rd place in the series play-off, behind CSMS Iași and Rapid București. The squad included, among others, Dobre, Oprea, Baruch, Stan, Antoniev, Soare, Lazăr, Tudorache, C. Toma, Florea, Roșu, N. Popescu, L. Mihai, Macare, Ivașcă, Ibrian, Patrianca, Dedu, Jianu, Nanu and D. Gheorghe.

Unirea Slobozia began the following season relying on the continuity of the squad led by Mihalcea, but endured a disappointing campaign. The club was eliminated in the fifth round of the 2014–15 Cupa României by Viitorul Axintele after a 3–3 draw following extra time and a 1–3 defeat on penalties, and was 7th in Series I at the winter break. In February 2015, however, the club withdrew from Liga II because of financial problems, six rounds before the end of the regular season, and forfeited its remaining matches 0–3, finishing 11th overall and continuing its activity only at youth level.

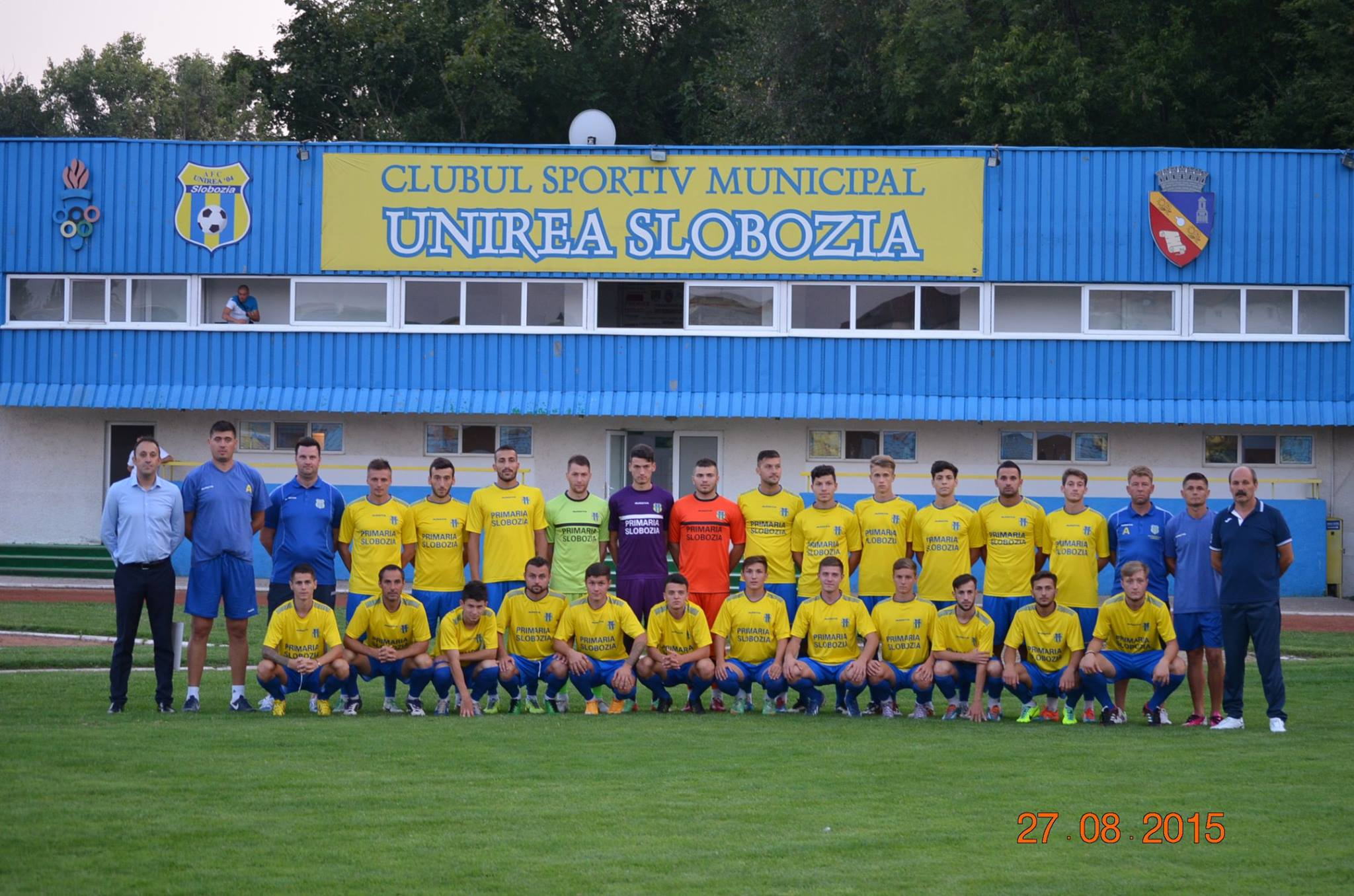
Unirea Slobozia team before the 2015–16 Liga III season

Unirea returned to Liga III for the 2015–16 season under Ion Ionescu as head coach. With a squad composed largely of young local players, the club achieved a respectable 4th-place finish, and remained under his guidance in 2016–17, finishing 5th.

Unirea began the 2017–18 season with Enache Costea as head coach. The club reached the Round of 16 of the 2017–18 Cupa României after defeating ASA Târgu Mureș 4–0, with Nelu Bucă scoring all four goals, before losing 0–2 to Politehnica Iași. Unirea also finished 3rd in Liga III that season. Costea then led Unirea to a 4th-place finish in the 2018–19 season and to the fourth round of the 2018–19 Cupa României, where it lost 2–3 to Sportul Snagov.

The 2019–20 season was suspended in March 2020 because of the COVID-19 pandemic, with Unirea leading its series, three points ahead of Mostiștea Ulmu. The two clubs subsequently met in a promotion play-off, which Unirea won 4–0 on aggregate after two 2–0 victories, returning to Liga II after five years. The squad led by Enache Costea included Gurău, Poiană, Stoianovici, Ibrian, Dinu, Dumbrăvean, Comșa, Lazăr, Lemnaru, Suciu, Unguru, Gherasim, Danciu, Ad. Moldovan, Răduca, C. Toma, Mihalache, Al. Muscă, M. Năstase and Cr. Ene.

After a poor run of results in the 2020–21 campaign, Enache Costea was replaced in December by Adrian Mihalcea, who returned to Slobozia for a second spell. Unirea finished 16th in the regular season and then third from bottom in Group B of the play-out, before avoiding relegation by defeating Comuna Recea 3–2 on aggregate in the relegation play-off.

In the 2021–22 season, Mihalcea led the Yellow and Blues to the Round of 32 of the 2021–22 Cupa României, where they were eliminated 0–1 by Politehnica Timișoara, and to 6th place in the Liga II regular season, a position they retained in the promotion play-off.

Mihalcea left the club in June 2022 after being appointed by top-flight side Chindia Târgoviște and was replaced by Costel Enache. Enache guided the club to the group stage of the 2022–23 Cupa României, where it finished 5th in its group and was eliminated. He resigned in March 2023 after Unirea finished 7th in the regular season of the 2022–23 campaign and missed the promotion play-off. His assistant, Enache Costea, took over and led the club to a 3rd-place finish in Group A of the relegation play-out.

In the 2023–24 season, Mihalcea returned to Unirea for a third spell and guided the team to the play-off round of the 2023–24 Cupa României, where it lost 2–5 after extra time to Hermannstadt. In Liga II, Unirea finished 2nd in the regular season before winning the promotion play-off by an eight-point margin, earning promotion to Liga I for the first time in the club's history. The squad included, among others, Rusu, Șt. Georgescu, Ciupercă, Aioanei, Dinu, Andreș, C. Toma, G. Lazăr, Șandru, Ibrian, Pospyelov, D. Lazăr, Dorobanțu, Bujor, Ekollo, Coadă, Atanase, Pacionel, Purece, Lemnaru, Milotin, Cojocari, Dimitrov, Gîrbăcea, Vlăsceanu and Afalna.

In its first season in the top flight, Unirea finished 15th in the regular season but improved during the play-out, ending in 8th place and qualifying for the relegation play-off against FC Voluntari. After losing the first leg 1–2 away, Unirea won the return match 1–0 after extra time, leaving the tie level on aggregate, and retained its SuperLiga status by winning the penalty shoot-out 4–3.

Unirea remained in the top flight for the 2025–26 season, but struggled again and entered the relegation play-out. The club was relegated directly on the final matchday after losing 0–1 at home to UTA Arad, finishing 9th in the play-out. As a result, Unirea returned to Liga II for the 2026–27 season, being officially listed by the Romanian Football Federation among the three clubs relegated from the SuperLiga.

== Honours ==
Liga II

- Winners (1): 2023–24

Divizia C / Liga III

- Winners (5): 1982–83, 1985–86, 1988–89, 2011–12, 2019–20
- Runners-up (3): 1978–79, 1979–80, 2010–11

Divizia D / Liga IV – Ialomița County

- Winners (3): 1969–70, 1997–98

== Players ==
=== First team squad ===
As of 30 September 2026

Note: Flags indicate national team as defined under FIFA eligibility rules; some limited exceptions apply. Players may hold more than one non-FIFA nationality.

No.	Pos.	Nation	Player
1	GK	ROU	Hunor Albert
2	DF	ROU	Raul Iancu
3	DF	ROU	Bogdan Marian
4	DF	ROU	Alexandru Stănică
5	MF	ROU	Rareș Lazăr
7	DF	ROU	Gabriel Nedelea
8	MF	ROU	Răzvan Grădinaru
9	FW	HUN	Gergely Bobál
10	DF	ROU	Constantin Toma (Captain)
11	FW	POR	Bruno Ventura
12	GK	MDA	Denis Rusu (3rd captain)
13	DF	POR	André Serra
14	DF	ROU	Gabriel Lazăr (4th captain)
16	MF	ROU	Szabolcs Szilágyi (on loan from FK Csíkszereda)

No.	Pos.	Nation	Player
17	FW	ROU	Robert Necșulescu (on loan from FCSB)
18	MF	ROU	Viorel Gîrbăcea
19	DF	ROU	Robert Ristoiu (on loan from Universitatea Craiova)
20	DF	ROU	David Todoran (on loan from Voluntari)
21	DF	ROU	Florinel Ibrian (Vice-captain)
22	GK	ROU	Alexandru Uțiu
23	FW	ROU	Andrei Tănase
24	MF	ROU	Alexandru Gavrilă
26	DF	ROU	Gabriel Bălan
27	FW	ROU	Lucas Câmpan (on loan from UTA Arad)
28	FW	SUI	Felipe Borges
29	MF	LTU	Deimantas Rimpa
33	MF	ROU	Alexandru Niculae

=== Out on loan ===
Note: Flags indicate national team as defined under FIFA eligibility rules; some limited exceptions apply. Players may hold more than one non-FIFA nationality.

No. / Pos. / Nation / Player; — / DF / ROU / Andrei Dorobanțu (at UTA Arad until 30 June 2027)	No. / Pos. / Nation / Player; — / MF / ROU / Ionuț Munteanu (at Recolta Gheorghe Doja until 30 June 2027)

== Club officials ==
=== Board of directors ===
Role	Name
Owners	(Romania) Slobozia Municipality (Romania) Ialomița County Council
President	(Romania) Constantin Prepeliță
Executive President	(Romania) Ilie Lemnaru
Sporting director	(Romania) Marian Nohai
Head of Youth Center	(Romania) Enache Costea
Licensing	(Romania) Lavinia Bușilă
Marketing director	(Romania) Ioan Nagat
Ticketing director	(Romania) Laviniu Hagianu
Head of Security	(Romania) Nicolae Voicu
Press officer	(Romania) George Șeitan
Social media	(Romania) Ada Ioniță
Administrator	(Romania) Ionuț Borș
Delegate	(Romania) Laurențiu Radu

=== Current technical staff ===
Role	Name
Head coach	(Romania) Ilie Poenaru
Assistant coach	(Romania) Romeo Soare
Goalkeeping coach	(Romania) Daniel Harnagea
Fitness coach	(Romania) Robert Panduru
Club doctor	(Romania) Adrian Motoacă
Masseurs	(Romania) Gabriel Basarab (Romania) Tudorel Sava
Store man	(Romania) Andrei Vizireanu

== Notable former players ==
The footballers enlisted below have had international cap(s) for their respective countries at junior and/or senior level and/or significant caps for AFC Unirea Slobozia.

Romania

- (Romania) Mihai Adăscăliței
- (Romania) Alexandru Albu
- (Romania) Paul Antoche
- (Romania) Cristian Bărbuț
- (Romania) Christo Bolohan
- (Romania) Ionuț Coadă
- (Romania) Cristian Coconașu
- (Romania) Laurențiu Cristea
- (Romania) Iosif Damaschin
- (Romania) Ionuț Dinu
- (Romania) Leonida Dobre
- (Romania) Andrei Dorobanțu
- (Romania) Andrei Dragu
- (Romania) Marian Florea
- (Romania) Dumitru Gheorghe
- (Romania) Viorel Gheorghe
- (Romania) Ion Gurău
- (Romania) Augustin Ivașcă
- (Romania) Marius Jianu
- (Romania) Marius Macare
- (Romania) Liviu Mihai
- (Romania) Adrian Mihalcea
- (Romania) Emil Nanu
- (Romania) Ovidiu Perianu
- (Romania) Ciprian Perju
- (Romania) Ștefan Petcu
- (Romania) Vlad Pop
- (Romania) Robert Popa
- (Romania) Florin Purece
- (Romania) Adrian Răduca
- (Romania) Costel Roșu
- (Romania) Ciprian Rus
- (Romania) Daniel Șerbănică
- (Romania) Gheorghe Tătaru
- (Romania) Leontin Toader
- (Romania) Laurențiu Vlăsceanu

Austria

- (Austria) Stefan Krell

Cameroon

- (Cameroon) Christ Afalna

Croatia

- (Croatia) Adnan Aganović

Equatorial Guinea

- (Equatorial Guinea) Esteban Orozco

France

- (France) Jordan Gele
- (France) Jayson Papeau

Georgia

- (Georgia (country)) Bachana Arabuli

Moldova

- (Moldova) Teodor Lungu

Slovakia

- (Slovakia) Jakub Vojtuš

Ukraine

- (Ukraine) Dmytro Pospyelov
- (Ukraine) Oleksandr Safronov

== Former managers ==
- (Romania) Titus Ozon (1977–1978)
- (Romania) Ion Păciulete (1982–1983)
- (Romania) Gheorghe Tătaru (1983–1984)
- (Romania) Constantin Dinu (1985–1986)
- (Romania) Emanoil Hașoti (1987)
- (Romania) Vasile Dobrău (1989–1990)
- (Romania) Ion Cojocaru (2007)
- (Romania) Marian Catană (2008–2009)
- (Romania) Ion Răuță (2009–2010)
- (Romania) Constantin Prepeliță (2010–2011)
- (Romania) Ion Ionescu (2011–2012)
- (Romania) Marin Dună (2012–2013)
- (Romania) Adrian Mihalcea (2013–2015)
- (Romania) Ion Ionescu (2015–2017)
- (Romania) Enache Costea (2017–2020)
- (Romania) Adrian Mihalcea (2020–2022)
- (Romania) Costel Enache (2022–2023)
- (Romania) Adrian Mihalcea (2023–2025)
- (Romania) Claudiu Niculescu (2026)
- (Romania) Vladimir Marica
- (Romania) Eusebiu Tudor

== League and cup history ==
Season	Tier	Division	Place	Notes	Cupa României
2026–27	2	Liga II	TBD		Play-off round
2025–26	1	Liga I	15th	Relegated	Play-off round
2024–25	1	Liga I	14th	Releg. PO winner	Play-off round
2023–24	2	Liga II	1st (C)	Promoted	Play-off round
2022–23	2	Liga II	7th		Group Stage
2021–22	2	Liga II	6th		Round of 32
2020–21	2	Liga II	16th	Play-out winner	Third Round
2019–20	3	Liga III (Seria II)	1st (C)	Promoted	Third Round
2018–19	3	Liga III (Seria II)	4th		Fourth Round
2017–18	3	Liga III (Seria II)	3rd		Round of 16
2016–17	3	Liga III (Seria II)	5th		Third Round
2015–16	3	Liga III (Seria II)	4th		Fourth Round
2014–15	2	Liga II (Seria I)	11th	Relegated	Round of 32
2013–14	2	Liga II (Seria I)	3rd		Fourth Round
2012–13	2	Liga II (Seria I)	7th		Fourth Round
2011–12	3	Liga III (Seria II)	1st (C)	Promoted	Fourth Round
2010–11	3	Liga III (Seria II)	2nd		Round of 32

Season	Tier	Division	Place	Notes	Cupa României
2009–10	3	Liga III (Seria II)	3rd		
2008–09	3	Liga III (Seria II)	4th		
2007–08	3	Liga III (Seria II)	8th		
2006–07	3	Liga III (Seria II)	6th		
2005–06	3	Divizia C (Seria II)	7th		
2000–01	3	Divizia C (Seria III)	16th	Relegated	
1999–00	3	Divizia C (Seria II)	14th		
1998–99	3	Divizia C (Seria II)	12th		
1997–98	4	Divizia D (IL)	1st (C)	Promoted	
1993–94	3	Divizia C (Seria II)	19th	Relegated	
1992–93	2	Divizia B (Seria I)	18th	Relegated	
1991–92	2	Divizia B (Seria I)	9th		
1990–91	2	Divizia B (Seria I)	8th		
1989–90	2	Divizia B (Seria I)	13th		
1988–89	3	Divizia C (Seria IV)	1st (C)	Promoted	
1987–88	2	Divizia B (Seria I)	16th	Relegated	
1986–87	2	Divizia B (Seria I)	7th		
