= 1989–90 Divizia B =

Divizia B
- Season: 1989–90
- Country: Romania
- Teams: 54 (3x18)
- Promoted: Progresul Brăila; Rapid București; Gloria Bistrița
- Relegated: Someșul Satu Mare; CFR Pașcani; IMASA Sfântu Gheorghe; Electromureș Târgu Mureș; CS Botoșani; Metalul Mija; Mureșul Deva; Viitorul Vaslui; Constructorul Craiova; CFR Cluj

The 1989–90 Divizia B was the 50th season of the second tier of the Romanian football league system.

The format has been maintained to three series, each of them having 18 teams. At the end of the season the winners of the series promoted to Divizia A and the last three places from each series relegated to Divizia C.

A relegation play-off was played between the 15th places from each series, team ranked last also relegated to Divizia C: the relegation play-off was necessary due to the fall of communism in December 1989, culminating with the exclusion from Divizia A of Flacăra Moreni and Olt Scornicești, and the dissolution of Victoria București.

== Team changes ==
=== To Divizia B ===
Promoted from Divizia C

- Foresta Fălticeni
- Viitorul Vaslui
- Olimpia Râmnicu Sărat
- Unirea Slobozia
- Autobuzul București
- Mecanică Fină București
- Constructorul Craiova
- Vagonul Arad
- Mureșul Explorări Deva
- IMASA Sfântu Gheorghe
- Steaua CFR Cluj
- Someșul Satu Mare

Relegated from Divizia A

- Oțelul Galați
- Rapid București
- ASA Târgu Mureș

=== From Divizia B ===
Relegated to Divizia C

- Metalul Plopeni
- Electroputere Craiova
- Minerul Cavnic
- FEPA 74 Bârlad
- Dacia Pitești
- Minerul Paroșeni
- Câmpulung Moldovenesc
- Dunărea Călărași
- Mecanica Orăștie
- Delta Tulcea
- Metalul Mangalia
- Avântul Reghin

Promoted to Divizia A

- Petrolul Ploiești
- Jiul Petroșani
- Politehnica Timișoara

=== Renamed teams ===
Steaua CFR Cluj was renamed as CFR Cluj.

Unirea Dinamo Focșani was renamed as Unirea Focșani.

== Teams ==
Location of 1989–90 Divizia B clubs

== League tables ==
=== Serie I ===
Pos	Team	Pld	W	D	L	GF	GA	GD	Pts	Promotion or relegation
1	Progresul Brăila (C, P)	34	22	4	8	69	19	+50	48	Promotion to Divizia A
2	Gloria Buzău	34	21	6	7	63	32	+31	48	
3	Oțelul Galați	34	20	0	14	54	35	+19	40	
4	Politehnica Iași	34	18	4	12	69	44	+25	40	
5	Steaua Mizil	34	17	3	14	48	40	+8	37	
6	Olimpia Râmnicu Sărat	34	15	6	13	36	37	−1	36	
7	CSM Suceava	34	15	5	14	48	39	+9	35	
8	Aripile Bacău	34	15	4	15	39	46	−7	34	
9	Foresta Fălticeni	34	16	2	16	46	58	−12	34	
10	Unirea Focșani	34	14	5	15	35	42	−7	33	
11	Prahova Ploiești	34	14	5	15	41	53	−12	33	
12	Poiana Câmpina	34	12	8	14	29	51	−22	32	
13	Unirea Slobozia	34	13	6	15	38	47	−9	32	
14	Ceahlăul Piatra Neamț	34	11	9	14	36	37	−1	31	
15	Siretul Pașcani (O)	34	12	7	15	25	37	−12	31	Qualification to relegation play-off
16	CFR Pașcani (R)	34	11	3	20	31	45	−14	25	Relegation to 1990–91 Divizia C
17	CS Botoșani (R)	34	9	4	21	37	55	−18	22	Relegation to 1990–91 Divizia C
18	Viitorul Vaslui (R)	34	8	5	21	42	69	−27	21	Relegation to 1990–91 Divizia C

Source: romaniansoccer.ro (in Romanian)
Rules for classification: 1) Points; 2) Head-to-head points; 3) Head-to-head goal difference; 4) Head-to-head goals scored; 5) Head-to-head away goals scored; 6) Goal difference; 7) Goals scored.
(C) Champions; (O) Play-off winners; (P) Promoted; (R) Relegated

=== Serie II ===
Pos	Team	Pld	W	D	L	GF	GA	GD	Pts	Promotion or relegation
1	Rapid București (C, P)	34	22	5	7	61	32	+29	49	Promotion to Divizia A
2	Drobeta-Turnu Severin	34	21	3	10	69	42	+27	45	
3	Unirea Alba Iulia	34	18	2	14	72	52	+20	38	
4	Chimia Râmnicu Vâlcea	34	16	5	13	51	41	+10	37	
5	Sportul 30 Decembrie	34	15	7	12	36	40	−4	37	
6	CS Târgoviște	34	15	4	15	59	56	+3	34	
7	FCM Caracal	34	14	6	14	45	44	+1	34	
8	Mecanică Fină București	34	14	5	15	58	49	+9	33	
9	Minerul Motru	34	16	1	17	35	49	−14	33	
10	Gaz Metan Mediaș	34	15	2	17	46	54	−8	32	
11	Autobuzul București	34	12	8	14	43	50	−7	32	
12	Metalurgistul Slatina	34	14	4	16	53	56	−3	32	
13	ICIM Brașov	34	13	6	15	47	45	+2	32	
14	Pandurii Târgu Jiu	34	11	10	13	40	42	−2	32	
15	Tractorul Brașov (O)	34	14	3	17	49	54	−5	31	Qualification to relegation play-off
16	IMASA Sfântu Gheorghe (R)	34	11	9	14	43	50	−7	31	Relegation to 1990–91 Divizia C
17	Metalul Mija (R)	34	13	3	18	49	66	−17	29	Relegation to 1990–91 Divizia C
18	Constructorul Craiova (R)	34	5	11	18	39	73	−34	21	Relegation to 1990–91 Divizia C

Source: romaniansoccer.ro (in Romanian)
Rules for classification: 1) Points; 2) Head-to-head points; 3) Head-to-head goal difference; 4) Head-to-head goals scored; 5) Head-to-head away goals scored; 6) Goal difference; 7) Goals scored.
(C) Champions; (O) Play-off winners; (P) Promoted; (R) Relegated

=== Serie III ===
Pos	Team	Pld	W	D	L	GF	GA	GD	Pts	Promotion or relegation
1	Gloria Bistrița (C, P)	34	18	9	7	87	40	+47	45	Promotion to Divizia A
2	UTA Arad	34	18	3	13	58	51	+7	39	
3	Maramureș Baia Mare	34	16	7	11	50	26	+24	39	
4	CSM Reșița	34	16	6	12	50	49	+1	38	
5	CFR Timișoara	34	15	6	13	50	53	−3	36	
6	Chimica Târnăveni	34	15	5	14	43	47	−4	35	
7	ASA Târgu Mureș	34	15	6	13	59	42	+17	36	
8	Armătura Zalău	34	12	10	12	43	53	−10	34	
9	Gloria Reșița	34	15	4	15	41	37	+4	34	
10	Vagonul Arad	34	14	6	14	58	53	+5	34	
11	Strungul Arad	34	14	6	14	49	37	+12	34	
12	Olimpia Satu Mare	34	15	4	15	37	43	−6	34	
13	Metalul Bocșa	34	15	3	16	52	44	+8	33	
14	Progresul Timișoara	34	13	7	14	46	56	−10	33	
15	Someșul Satu Mare (R)	34	14	5	15	47	52	−5	33	Qualification to relegation play-off
16	Electromureș Târgu Mureș (R)	34	14	4	16	48	55	−7	32	Relegation to 1990–91 Divizia C
17	Mureșul Deva (R)	34	7	9	18	44	84	−40	23	Relegation to 1990–91 Divizia C
18	CFR Cluj (R)	34	5	10	19	26	66	−40	20	Relegation to 1990–91 Divizia C

Source: romaniansoccer.ro (in Romanian)
Rules for classification: 1) Points; 2) Head-to-head points; 3) Head-to-head goal difference; 4) Head-to-head goals scored; 5) Head-to-head away goals scored; 6) Goal difference; 7) Goals scored.
(C) Champions; (P) Promoted; (R) Relegated

== Relegation play-off ==
The 15th-placed teams from each series of Divizia B played a relegation play-off. The play-off was held in Bucharest and the team ranked last at the end of the tournament relegated to Divizia C.

Pos	Team	Pld	W	D	L	GF	GA	GD	Pts	Relegation
1	Siretul Pașcani	2	1	0	1	2	1	+1	2	
2	Tractorul Brașov	2	1	0	1	2	2	0	2	
3	Someșul Satu Mare (R)	2	1	0	1	2	3	−1	2	Relegation to 1990–91 Divizia C

Source: romaniansoccer.ro
Rules for classification: Rules for classification: 1) Points 2) Head-to-head points; 3) Head-to-head goal difference; 4) Head-to-head goals scored; 5) Head-to-head away goals scored; 6) Goal difference; 7) Goals scored.
(R) Relegated

=== Round 1 ===
Team 1	Score	Team 2
Tractorul Brașov	1–2	Someșul Satu Mare

=== Round 2 ===
Team 1	Score	Team 2
Siretul Pașcani	2–0	Someșul Satu Mare

=== Round 3 ===
Team 1	Score	Team 2
Tractorul Brașov	1–0	Siretul Pașcani

== Top scorers ==
12 goals

- (Romania) Gábor Gerstenmájer (Olimpia Satu Mare)

9 goals

- (Romania) Florin Constantinovici (Rapid București)
- (Romania) Mihăiță Hanghiuc (Oțelul Galați)

8 goals

- (Romania) Haralambie Antohi (Oțelul Galați)

7 goals

- (Romania) Ion Profir (Oțelul Galați)

== See also ==
- 1989–90 Divizia A
