= CSA Steaua București (football) =

Association football club in Bucharest

Steaua București
- Full name: Clubul Sportiv al Armatei; Steaua București
- Nicknames: Roș-albaștrii (The Red and Blues); Militarii (The Militaries); Viteziștii (The Speedsters)
- Short name: Steaua
- Founded: 7 June 1947; 79 years ago
- Stadium: Steaua
- Capacity: 31,254
- Owner: Ministry of National Defence
- President: Eduard Danilof
- Head coach: Daniel Oprița
- League: Liga II
- 2025–26: Liga II, 5th of 22
- Website: www.csasteaua.ro/jocuri-sportive/fotbal/
Home colours	Away colours

Clubul Sportiv al Armatei Steaua București (Romanian pronunciation: [ˈste̯awa bukuˈreʃtʲ]), commonly known as Steaua București, or simply as Steaua, is a Romanian professional football club based in Bucharest. It is one of the sporting sections of the namesake CSA Steaua București and competes in the Liga II.

In 2017, the parent club reactivated its football section and entered it into the 2017–18 season of Liga IV, the fourth tier of the Romanian football league system. According to the club's records and the latest Romanian court orders (July 2019 and June 2021) it is the most successful football club in Romania, with national records for winning the domestic trophies, plus the European Cup in 1986 and European Super Cup in 1987. However, ownership of the titles is disputed between two entities, with UEFA attributing all of the original club history to the other club, FCSB.

They play their home matches at the new Steaua Stadium. They used to play on Ghencea V between 2017 and 2021, one of the former training fields of the Complexul Sportiv Steaua, as the previous stadium, used by the historic Steaua entity during its heyday, was demolished in order for the current stadium to be built in the old one's place. The team colours are red and blue.

The club has a long-standing rivalry with neighbouring Dinamo București, with matches between the two being commonly referred to as "the Eternal Derby", "the Romanian Derby", or "the Great Derby".

== History ==
ASA București (Asociația Sportivă a Armatei București – "Army Sports Association") was founded on 7 June 1947 at the initiative of several officers of the Romanian Royal House. The establishment took place following a decree signed by General Mihail Lascăr, High Commander of the Romanian Royal Army. It was formed as a sports society with seven initial sections, including football, coached by Coloman Braun-Bogdan. ASA was renamed CSCA (Clubul Sportiv Central al Armatei – "Central Sports Club of the Army") in 1948 and CCA (Casa Centrală a Armatei – "Central House of the Army") in 1950.

Name	Period
Asociația Sportivă a Armatei (ASA) București	1947–1948
Clubul Sportiv Central al Armatei (CSCA) București	1948–1950
Casa Centrală a Armatei (CCA) București	1950–1961
Clubul Sportiv al Armatei (CSA) Steaua București	1961–1998
Asociația Fotbal Club (AFC) Steaua București	1998–2003
Clubul Sportiv al Armatei (CSA) Steaua București	2017–present

In 1949, CSCA won its first trophy, the Cupa României, defeating CSU Cluj 2–1 in the final. Under the name of CCA, the club managed to win three Championship titles in a row in 1951, 1952 and 1953, along with its first Championship–Cup double in 1951. During the 1950s, the so-called "CCA Golden Team" became nationally famous. In 1956, the Romania national team (composed exclusively of CCA players) played Yugoslavia in Belgrade and won 1–0. In the same year, CCA, coached by Ilie Savu, became the first Romanian team to participate in a tournament in England, where it achieved noteworthy results against the likes of Luton Town, Arsenal, Sheffield Wednesday and Wolverhampton Wanderers.

At the end of 1961, CCA changed its name once again to CSA Steaua București (Clubul Sportiv al Armatei Steaua – "Army Sports Club Steaua"). The club's new name translated to The Star and was adopted because of the presence of a red star, a symbol of most East European Army clubs, on its crest. A poor period of almost two decades followed in which the club claimed only three championships (1967–68, 1975–76, 1977–78). Instead, the team won nine national cup trophies, for which matter it gained the nickname of "cup specialists". Also during this period, on 9 April 1974 Steaua's ground, Stadionul Ghencea, was inaugurated with a friendly match against OFK Belgrade.

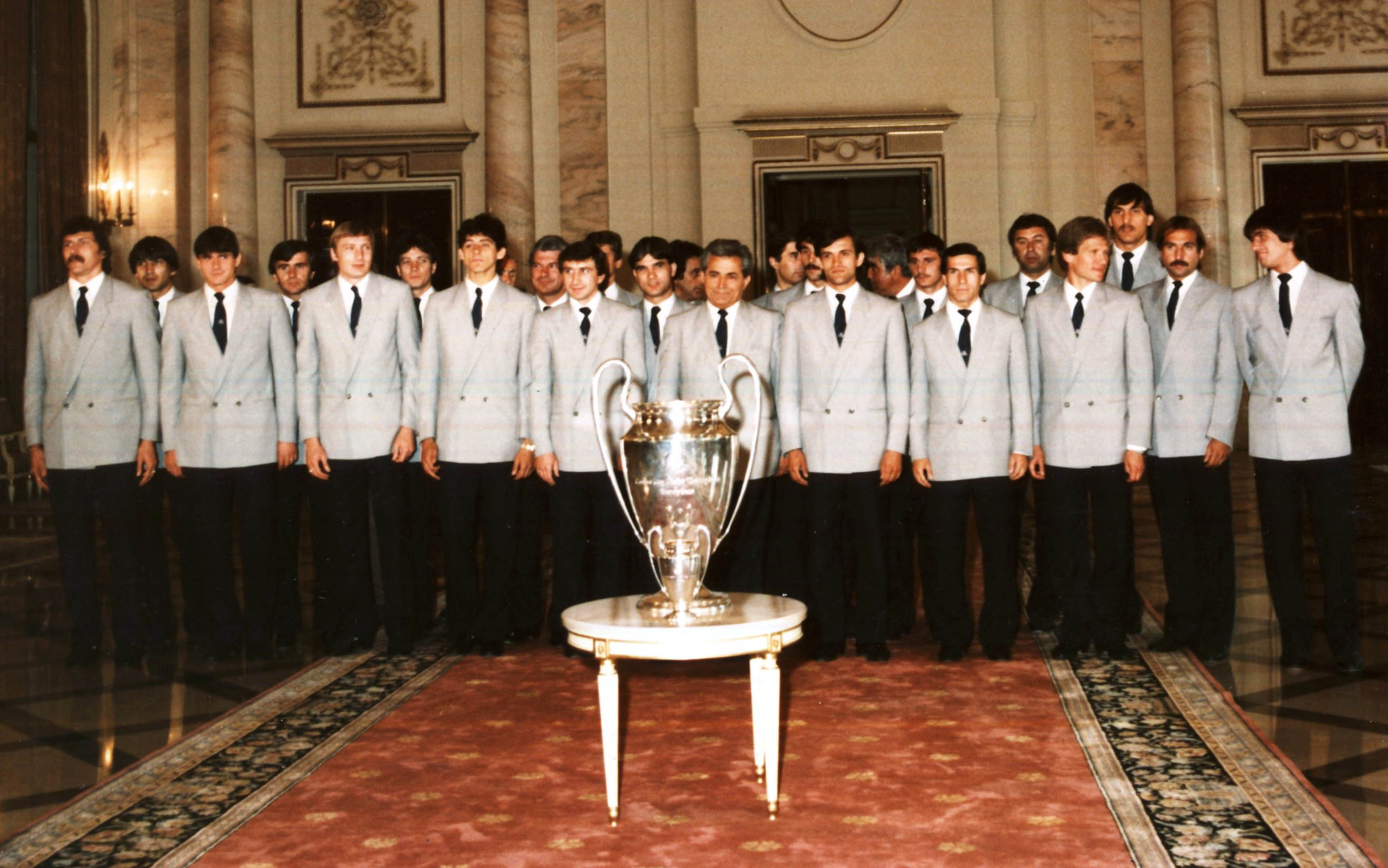
Steaua with the UEFA European Champions Clubs' Cup in 1986.

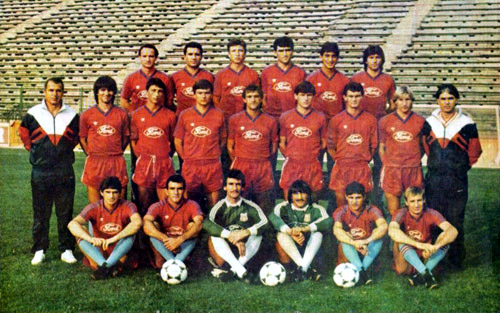
The champion team of 1989

Under the leadership of coaches Emerich Jenei and Anghel Iordănescu, Steaua had an impressive Championship run in the 1984–85 season, which it won after a six-year break. Subsequently, Steaua became the first Romanian club to reach a European Cup final, which it ultimately won against Barcelona on penalties (2–0 thanks to goalkeeper Helmut Duckadam saving all four penalties taken by the Spaniards), after a goalless draw. Steaua therefore became the first Eastern European team to claim the title of European champions. An additional European Super Cup was won in 1987 against Dynamo Kyiv. Steaua remained at the top of European football for the rest of the decade, managing one more European Cup semi-final in 1987–88 and one more European Cup final in 1989 (lost 4–0 to Milan). Notably, this was in addition to its four additional national titles (1985–86, 1986–87, 1987–88, (Note: Steaua București gave up the trophy in 1990.) 1988–89) and four national cups (1984–85, 1986–87, 1987–88, 1988–89). Furthermore, from June 1986 to September 1989, Steaua ran a record 104-match undefeated streak in the championship, setting a world record for that time and a European one still standing.

The Romanian Revolution led the country towards a free open market and, subsequently, several players of the 1980s team left for other clubs in the West. After a short pull-back, a quick recovery followed and Steaua managed a six consecutive championship streak between 1992–93 and 1997–98 to equalize the 1920s performance of Chinezul Timișoara and also three more cups in 1995–96, 1996–97 and 1998–99. At international level, the club also managed to reach the UEFA Champions League group stage three years in a row between 1994–95 and 1996–97.

=== AFC Steaua ===
In 1998, Steaua's football section separated from CSA Steaua and changed its name to AFC Steaua București ruled by a non-profit association led by Romanian businessman Viorel Păunescu. Păunescu performed poorly as a president and soon the club was plunged into debt. George Becali, another businessman, was offered the position of vice-president in hope of richer investment in the club. In 2003, Becali managed to gain control over the club by turning it from non-profit to a public share company.

Subsequently, even though the club managed to win five national championships and to qualify for the UEFA Champions League four times, it became increasingly associated with Becali's controversial character, infamous for his homophobia, xenophobia, misogyny, racism, tax evasion and even imprisonments. Apart from this, the club also moved from the historical Stadionul Ghencea to the newly built Arena Națională.

=== Steaua vs FCSB lawsuit ===
In December 2014, following legal action from former parent club CSA Steaua, the Becali-backed club lost its right to use the "Steaua" trademark, its use having never been approved by CSA Steaua București. The club which had acted as Steaua throughout this time was summoned to change their name and logo; presently, they are officially called SC FC FCSB SA and continue to play in Liga I. A further ongoing trial was initiated by CSA Steaua, claiming FC FCSB must pay almost 37 million Euros as compensation for having unlawfully used the Steaua brand from 2003. In July 2019, the judgement was made in favour of CSA Steaua, subject to appeal.

According to comments made by Constantin Danilescu (a former Steaua employee who worked for the club until 1999), during the 1998 separation CSA Steaua did not relinquish ownership of the team's name, honours or brand, as was believed until 2017. The club only allowed the non-profit it partnered with to use these elements, but the non-profit never had any right to sell them, placing doubt over the claims of FCSB to titles won before the takeover by Becali.

The verdict about the records remained final in 2025. Odd enough, both sides to the trial claimed victory as of 5 June 2025.

It has also been mentioned that civil law arguments might not be decisive in respect to getting the records recognized by the Romanian Football Federation, UEFA, and FIFA, because they all base their decisions upon the continuity of the team.

=== New start in Liga IV ===
Having legally reclaimed the football team, CSA Steaua București reactivated its football section and entered it to Liga IV's 2017–18 season, the fourth tier of the Romanian Championship. Funded from privately owned CSA Steaua finances, the team's objective is to promote every year to the higher league, until it reaches Liga I, a timeline which is to coincide with the opening of the new Stadionul Ghencea.

In April 2018, Steaua București played a home league fixture against AS Academia Rapid București, the principal 'phoenix club' established by supporters of the defunct FC Rapid București. Due to the high profile of the participants, the match was moved to the Arena Națională and attracted a crowd of 36,277, setting a lower-league national record; Rapid București won 3–1 to consolidate their position at the top of the table, with Steaua five points behind in second place.

The team reached the promotion play-offs in their first two seasons but lost each time. Steaua finally achieved promotion at the end of the 2019–20 season. They were promoted the very next season to Liga II.

== Crest and colours ==
The evolution of Steaua's crest from 1947 up until the present day

ASA București was founded by the Royal Army on 7 June 1947. During its first season, 1947–48, Steaua wore yellow and red striped shirts with blue shorts, to symbolize Romania's tricolour flag.

Starting with the following season and with the Army's change of identity from the Royal Army to the People's Army, the yellow was gradually given up, so that the official colours remained, up to this day, the red and the blue.

Following the Romanian Revolution, the Army decided to break all links to the defunct communist regime, so, in 1991, CSA Steaua had a last change of crest with an eagle also present on the Ministry of Defence coat of arms and also on Romania's.

As FC Steaua appeared in 1998, the club added two yellow stars on top of the CSA Steaua badge signifying its 20 titles of champions won, along with the Fotbal Club specification.

== Kit manufacturers and shirt sponsors ==
Period	Kit manufacturer	Shirt sponsor
1947–1976	None	None
1976–1988	(Germany) Adidas	None
1988–1990	(Germany) Adidas	(United States) Ford
1990–1991	(Germany) Adidas	(United Kingdom) Castrol
1991–1994	(Germany) Adidas	(Netherlands) Philips
1994	(Germany) Adidas	(United States) CBS
1995	(Germany) Adidas	(Romania) BRCE
1996–1997	(Germany) Adidas	(Romania) Bancorex
1997–1999	(Germany) Adidas	(Romania) Dialog
2000–2002	(Germany) Adidas	(Romania) BCR
2002–2003	(United States) Nike	None
2017–2018	(Spain) Joma	(Romania) BetArena
2018–2019	(Spain) Joma / (Germany) Jako	(Romania) GoBet^{1}
2019–2021	(Spain) Joma	None
2021^{2}	(Spain) Joma	(Romania) Get's Bet, (Austria) Porotherm (Wienerberger) & (Romania) International Alexander Holding
2021–2024	(Germany) Adidas	(Romania) Get's Bet, (Austria) Porotherm (Wienerberger) & (Romania) International Alexander Holding
2024–present	(Germany) Adidas	(Romania) Stanleybet

1. Partner of Superbet
2. Just for a few matches (pre-season friendlies, 1 cup match and the first 4 league games of the 2021-22 season)

== Grounds ==
Ghencea
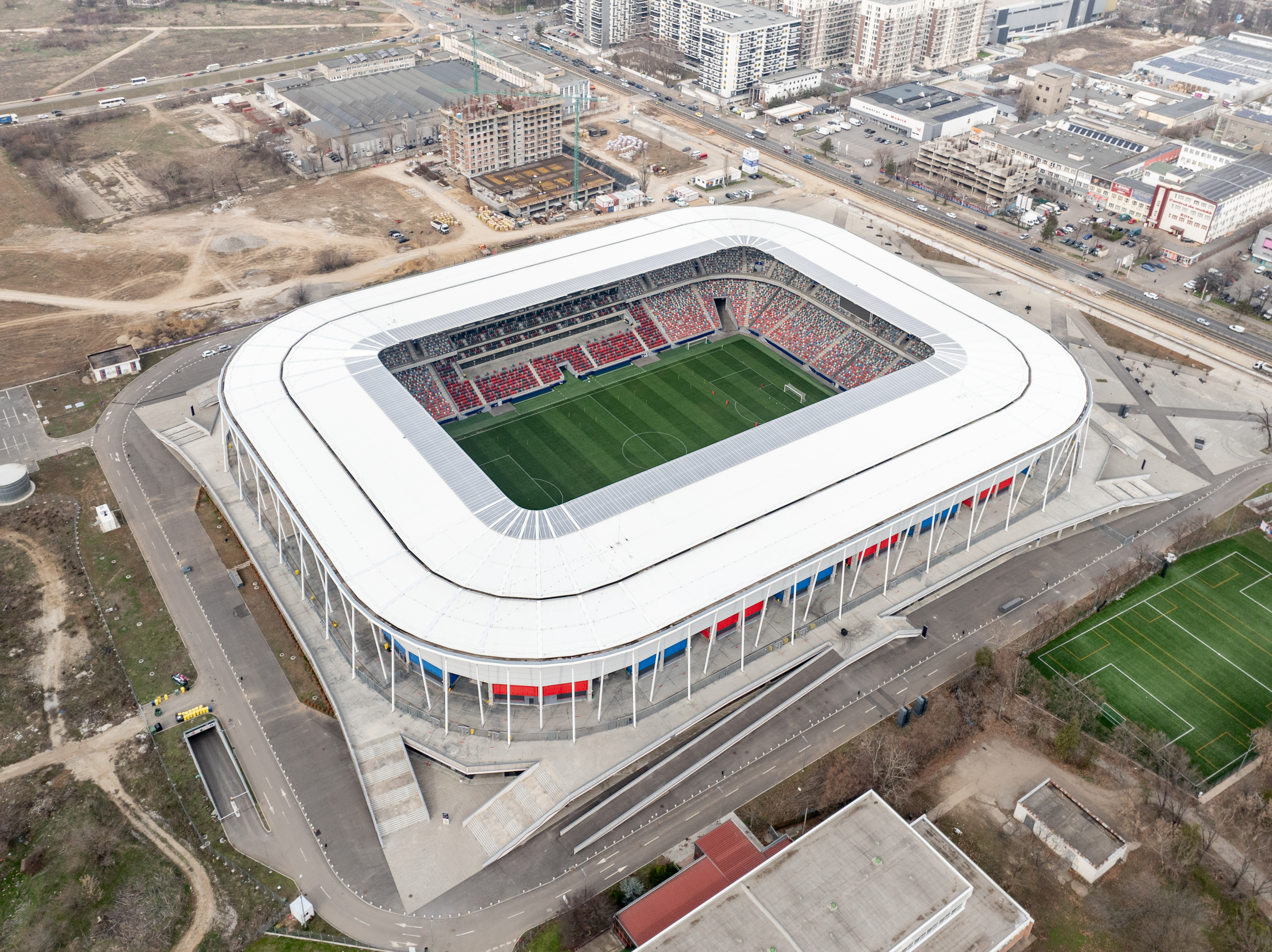
- Location: 35, Bulevardul Ghencea, Bucharest, Romania
- Owner: Ministry of National Defence
- Capacity: 31,254

Construction
- Opened: July 2021

Steaua played the first three matches in its history at the defunct Venus stadium. Opened in 1931, the venue had previously been in the property of Venus București, a club disbanded in 1949. After that ground's demolition through order of the Communist regime, Steaua played its home matches at any one of Bucharest's three largest multi-use stadia: ANEF, Republicii (built in 1926 and demolished in 1984 to make room for the erection of the Casa Poporului) and 23 August (built in 1953). Of these two, 23 August (later renamed Național) was mostly used when two matches between Bucharest clubs were scheduled in the same matchday or for important European matches, while Republicii for regular matches in the championship.

From 1974 to 2003, Steaua played its home matches at the Stadionul Ghencea, a football stadium situated in South-Western Bucharest. Part of Complexul Sportiv Steaua, it was inaugurated on 9 April 1974 when Steaua played a friendly match against OFK Beograd, at which time it was the first football-only stadium ever built in Communist Romania, with no track & field facilities. The stadium was built through order of the Ministry of National Defence inside a former military base and was long used by CSA Steaua.

The original capacity was 30,000 on benches. A general renovation occurred in 1991; this included installing seats, which dropped the capacity to 28,365.

The new stadium was inaugurated on 7 July 2021, with a match between Steaua and OFK Beograd.

== Support ==
=== Present day ===
While ultra groups stopped attending matches around the time of the Court's demand that FCSB doesn't have the rights to be Steaua, regular spectators (citizens) continued their presence at Arena Națională matches and now form the majority of the FCSB support, mostly at important European fixtures but also with Universitatea Craiova, CFR Cluj and Dinamo Bucharest.

Ever since the Court's decision in 2014, Peluza Sud has fully adopted the reopened football team of Steaua București and represents a constant presence for the Liga IV matches.

More recently, as of 2017, the supporters have formed their own official association, called AS47 (Asociația Steliștilor 1947 – Steaua Supporters' Association 1947), as a legal entity with its stated goals of 'reoffering Steaua and its supporters their true meaning, in harmony with the club's original values'.

During the 2017–18 season, while playing in the 4th Romanian division, Steaua's home match against Rapid achieved a national record, with an audience of 36.277 spectators.

=== Rivalries ===
Steaua's most important rivalry is the one against Dinamo București. Eternul derby ("The Eternal Derby") has been the leading Romanian football encounter in the last 60 years, as Steaua and Dinamo are the two most successful football teams in the country. There have been more than 100 matches played so far between Steaua and Dinamo in the Romanian League, the Romanian Cup and also the Romanian Supercup. With 39 titles combined (Steaua – 21; Dinamo – 18), the two sides have won 31 more than the third-most successful Liga I club, Venus București. It is also a match between the former clubs of the Romanian Army (Steaua) and the Ministry of Internal Affairs (Dinamo). Several clashes between different factions of supporters have often occurred and still occur inside and outside the stadium. The heyday was reached before a match kick-off in 1997, when Dinamo's fans set a sector of Stadionul Ghencea's Peluza Sud, where they were assigned, on fire.

The second-most important rivalry is with Rapid București. Several matches throughout the years between Steaua and Rapid have also ended in serious clashes between fans. The conflict has become even fiercer after FCSB (then believed to be Steaua) outpassed Rapid in an all-Romanian quarter-final of the 2005–06 UEFA Cup. The local sports newspapers said that the two teams were linked up in this quarter-final by the line of the number 41 tram which links the Ghencea Stadium to the Valentin Stănescu Stadium.

Milder and historical rivalries are also with non-Bucharest-based teams, such as Universitatea Craiova, Politehnica Timișoara, Petrolul Ploiești, CFR Cluj, Universitatea Cluj and a recent one with FC FCSB.

=== Friendships ===
As Steaua is the most popular club in Romania, there are, besides Bucharest, several cities counting a great majority of red and blue supporters among football lovers. Widely speaking, these cities are predominant in the Eastern half of the country, particularly in the regions of Moldavia, Greater Wallachia and Northern Dobruja. Cities such as Suceava, Piatra Neamț, Bacău, Galați (inside Moldavia), Constanța (Northern Dobruja), Buzău, Brăila, Târgoviște, Călărași (Greater Wallachia), Râmnicu Vâlcea, Târgu Jiu (Oltenia), Brașov, Oradea, Sibiu, Târgu Mureș or Petroșani (Transylvania) enjoy a great majority of Steaua fans which are often well-received even by fans of the local teams.

The club is also popular outside the borders, notably between Romanian emigrants. The Valencian Community in Spain accounts for an important number of supporters, being the most important area for this matter.

Steaua fans are also maintaining good relations with the fans of CSKA Sofia of Bulgaria, with whom they share the common root of once representing the teams of their national armies. Some ultras are also friends with the ultras from UTA Arad, Corvinul Hunedoara and Farul Constanța.

== Honours ==
=== Domestic ===
==== Leagues ====
- Liga I / Divizia A
  - Winners (20) – Record: 1951, 1952, 1953, 1956, 1959–60, 1960–61, 1967–68, 1975–76, 1977–78, 1984–85, 1985–86, 1986–87, 1987–88, 1988–89, 1992–93, 1993–94, 1994–95, 1995–96, 1996–97, 1997–98
  - Runners-up (9): 1954, 1957–58, 1962–63, 1976–77, 1979–80, 1983–84, 1989–90, 1990–91, 1991–92
- Liga II
  - Runners-up (2): 2022–23, 2024–25
- Liga III
  - Winners (1): 2020–21
- Liga IV – Bucharest
  - Winners (1): 2019–20
  - Runners-up (2): 2017–18, 2018–19

==== Cups ====
- Cupa României
  - Winners (20) – Record: 1948–49, 1950, 1951, 1952, 1955, 1961–62, 1965–66, 1966–67, 1968–69, 1969–70, 1970–71, 1975–76, 1978–79, 1984–85, 1986–87, 1987–88, 1988–89, 1991–92, 1995–96, 1996–97
  - Runners-up (7): 1953, 1963–64, 1976–77, 1979–80, 1983–84, 1985–86, 1989–90
- Cupa României – Bucharest
  - Winners (2): 2018–19, 2019–20
  - Runners-up (1): 2017–18
- Supercupa României
  - Winners (3): 1994, 1995, 1998

=== International ===
- UEFA Champions League / European Cup
  - Winners (1): 1985–86
  - Runners-up (1): 1988–89
- UEFA Super Cup / European Super Cup
  - Winners (1): 1986
- Intercontinental Cup
  - Runners-up (1): 1986

== Players ==
=== First team squad ===
As of 8 October 2026

Note: Flags indicate national team as defined under FIFA eligibility rules; some limited exceptions apply. Players may hold more than one non-FIFA nationality.

No.	Pos.	Nation	Player
1	GK	ROU	Iannis Pletea
2	DF	ROU	Alexandru Maxim
4	DF	ROU	Dean Beța (4th captain)
5	DF	ESP	Carlos Dorado
6	DF	ROU	Ionuț Dinu
8	MF	ROU	Ionuț Coadă
9	FW	ROU	Mario Ilie
10	FW	ROU	Bogdan Chipirliu (Vice-captain)
11	MF	BRA	Pedro Caldieraro
13	DF	ROU	Adrian Ilie (Captain)
14	FW	ROU	Alexandru Nofitovici
17	MF	ROU	Mihai Bobaru
19	MF	CPV	Bruno Carvalho
20	DF	ROU	Florin Răsdan (3rd captain)

No.	Pos.	Nation	Player
21	MF	MAR	Ayoub Abou
22	GK	ROU	Horia Iancu
23	FW	ESP	Carlos González
26	DF	ROU	Mihai Adăscăliței
27	DF	ROU	Ștefan Pacionel
30	MF	ROU	Cătălin Tolea
33	GK	ROU	Máté Simon
34	MF	ROU	Alexandru Albu
76	MF	ROU	Ștefan Rotaru
77	DF	ROU	Laurențiu Vlăsceanu
80	MF	ESP	Javi Grillo
90	FW	ESP	Dani García
—	MF	ROU	Luca Albu

=== Dual registration ===
Note: Flags indicate national team as defined under FIFA eligibility rules; some limited exceptions apply. Players may hold more than one non-FIFA nationality.

No.	Pos.	Nation	Player
33	GK	ROU	Máté Simon (from FK Csíkszereda)
—	DF	ROU	György Papp (from FK Csíkszereda)
—	MF	ROU	Szabolcs Nyitra (from FK Csíkszereda)

No.	Pos.	Nation	Player
—	MF	ROU	Előd Tóth-Pál (from FK Csíkszereda)
—	FW	ROU	Luca Noveli (from FK Csíkszereda)

=== Out on loan ===
Note: Flags indicate national team as defined under FIFA eligibility rules; some limited exceptions apply. Players may hold more than one non-FIFA nationality.

No.	Pos.	Nation	Player
—	DF	ROU	Alexandru Berbecaru (to Progresul Mogoșoaia until 30 June 2027)
—	MF	ROU	Eric Grigore (to Oxigen București until 30 June 2027)

No.	Pos.	Nation	Player
—	MF	ROU	Tudor Lanțoș (to 1599 Șelimbăr until 30 June 2027)
—	FW	ROU	Robert Velcea (to Înainte Modelu until 30 June 2027)

=== Retired numbers ===
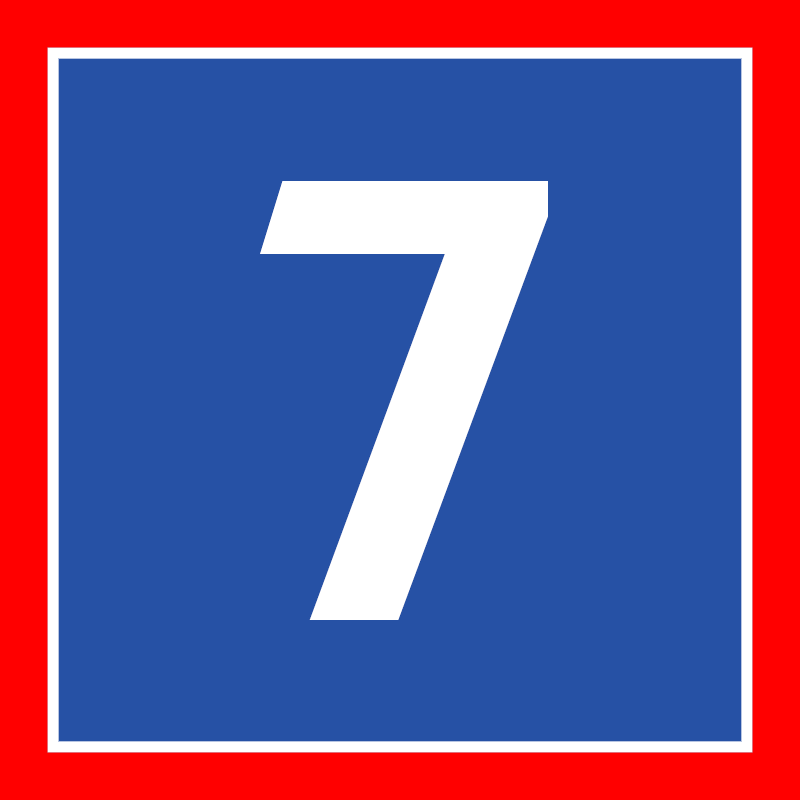
Shirt number 7 retired in 2021 as tribute to Marius Lăcătuș

Note: Flags indicate national team as defined under FIFA eligibility rules; some limited exceptions apply. Players may hold more than one non-FIFA nationality.

No.	Pos.	Nation	Player
7	FW	ROU	Marius Lăcătuș (1983–1990 & 1993-2000)

On 7 July 2021, Steaua retired the number 7 at the inauguration match of the new Steaua Stadium. The last player to wear the number 7 was Florin Răsdan, during the 2020–21 season.

== Club officials ==
=== Board of administration ===
Role	Name
President	(Romania) Eduard Danilof
Vice-president	(Romania) Teodor Popa
Administrative Director	(Romania) Adrian Lucan
General Director	(Romania) Andrei Cian
Executive President	(Romania) Bogdan Marinescu
Technical Director	(Romania) Gabriel Boștină
Technical youth center Director	(Romania) George Ogăraru
Head of Youth Development	(Romania) Ștefan Iovan
Delegate	(Romania) Liviu Vlaicu
Press Officer	(Romania) Daniel Remeș

- Last updated: 1 May 2025

=== Current technical staff ===
Role	Name
Head coach	(Romania) Daniel Oprița
Assistant coaches	(Romania) Ștefan Nofitovici (Brazil) Walace
Goalkeeping coach	(Romania) Cornel Fulga
Fitness coach	(Romania) Grigoraș Diaconescu
Video analyst	(Romania) Valentin Bărbulescu
Kinetotherapist	(Romania) Constantin Cucu
Masseur	(Romania) George Matara
Store man	(Romania) Gheorghe Neagoe

- Last updated: 22 August 2025

== See also ==
- Football in Romania
- List of unbeaten football club seasons
- European football club records
