= List of Romanian football transfers summer 2026 =

This is a list of Romanian football transfers for the 2026 summer transfer window. Only moves featuring 2026–27 Liga I are listed.

The summer transfer window will open on 17 June 2026, although some transfers were announced before that date. Players without a club may join one at any time, either during or in between transfer windows. The transfer window ends on 7 September 2026, although a few completed transfers could still be announced a few days later.

== SuperLiga ==
Note: Flags indicate national team as has been defined under FIFA eligibility rules. Players may hold more than one non-FIFA nationality.

=== Botoșani ===
In:

No.	Pos.	Nation	Player
1	GK	ROU	David Dincă (from Farul Constanța, previously on loan at CS Dinamo București)
2	DF	COD	Brian Bayeye (from (France) Villefranche)
8	MF	IRL	Roland Idowu (from (Scotland) St Mirren)
9	FW	ROU	Jovan Marković (from Farul Constanța)
14	FW	ROU	George Șorodoc (loan return from Bucovina Rădăuți)
27	GK	ROU	Ion Gurău (from (Albania) Bylis)
77	FW	BRA	Gabriel Gama (from (Qatar) Al-Mesaimeer)
90	FW	ROU	Mario Preda (from FCSB, previously on loan at Râmnicu Vâlcea)
94	DF	FRA	Mamadou Diarra (from (Iraq) Erbil)

Out:

No.	Pos.	Nation	Player
1	GK	BIH	Luka Kukić (Free agent)
3	DF	SVN	Michael Pavlovič (to (Armenia) Noah)
6	DF	BIH	Riad Šuta (to (Czech Republic) Česká Lípa)
8	MF	ANG	Aldaír (to (Vietnam) Cong An Ho Chi Minh City)
9	FW	ARG	Enzo López (to (Albania) Bylis)
12	MF	NGA	Friday Adams (to Universitatea Cluj)
17	MF	ROU	Ștefan Pănoiu (to Concordia Chiajna)
19	FW	ROU	Antonio Dumitru (to Unirea Alba Iulia)
20	MF	ROU	Alexandru Bota (loan return to Universitatea Cluj, later on loan to Bihor Oradea)
22	MF	ROU	Andrei Dumitru (to Metaloglobus București)
33	MF	ROU	Gabriel David (on loan to Cetatea Suceava)
75	MF	ROU	David Ciurel (on loan to Ghiroda)
—	DF	ROU	Mario Feraru (on loan to CSM Adjud 1946)
—	FW	ROU	Adrian Răuțu (on loan to Pașcani, previously on loan at Bucovina Rădăuți)

=== CFR Cluj ===
In:

No.	Pos.	Nation	Player
3	DF	GEO	Iva Gelashvili (from (Greece) Panserraikos)
5	MF	URU	Francisco Barrios (from (Uruguay) Boston River)
7	FW	BIH	Adi Nalić (from (Bosnia and Herzegovina) Zrinjski Mostar)
9	FW	SRB	Stefan Dražić (from (Cyprus) APOEL)
18	MF	AUT	Ervin Omić (on loan from (Poland) Wisła Kraków)
19	FW	ROU	Sergiu Buș (from Hermannstadt)
20	DF	ROU	Alexandru Țîrlea (loan return from Metaloglobus București)}
21	DF	ROU	Cristian Ignat (from Rapid București, previously on loan at Petrolul Ploiești)
22	MF	ROU	Mateo Miclăuș (loan return from Unirea Alba Iulia)}
23	FW	GHA	Amin Ziblim (from AFC Câmpulung Muscel)
29	FW	ALG	Billel Omrani (from Concordia Chiajna)
40	DF	MDA	Leo Saca (from (Spain) Barcelona Atlètic)
41	DF	CRO	Anton Krešić (loan return from (Albania) Tirana)
42	DF	CRO	Renato Pantalon (from (Czech Republic) Jablonec)
66	MF	ESP	Cristian David (from (Spain) Real Madrid Castilla)
96	GK	ROU	Árpád Tordai (from UTA Arad)
99	FW	BEL	Jelani Trevisan (from (Portugal) Benfica B)

Out:

No.	Pos.	Nation	Player
2	DF	ROU	Marian Huja (to (Morocco) Raja Casablanca, previously signed from (Poland) Pogoń Szczecin, previously on loan)
3	DF	MTN	Aly Abeid (to (Algeria) JS Kabylie)
6	DF	GAM	Sheriff Sinyan (to Rapid București)
7	FW	LBR	Mohammed Kamara (to Rapid București)
7	FW	KOS	Meriton Korenica (to FCSB)
9	FW	SWE	Alibek Aliyev (to Universitatea Cluj)
10	MF	ROU	Ciprian Deac (Retired)
21	MF	BIH	Igor Savić (to (Bosnia and Herzegovina) Zrinjski Mostar, previously signed from Zrinjski Mostar)
23	MF	FRA	Tidiane Keïta (to (Kazakhstan) Ordabasy)
27	DF	ROU	Matei Ilie (to (Turkey) Kasımpaşa)
28	MF	POR	Bruno Costa (Free agent, previously signed from (South Korea) Gimhae)
29	FW	MLI	Moussa Samaké (on loan to ASA Târgu Mureș, previously on loan at Concordia Chiajna)
36	MF	ISR	Yuval Sade (to (Vietnam) Hà Nội, previously signed from (Israel) Maccabi Netanya)
44	DF	MDA	Daniel Dumbrăvanu (to Voluntari, previously on loan)
70	FW	ROU	Denis Crișan (Free agent)
71	GK	ROU	Mihai Popa (to (Poland) Motor Lublin)
73	MF	CRO	Karlo Muhar (to FCSB)
84	DF	ROU	Alexandru Radu (on loan to CIL Blaj)
87	DF	ROU	Alexandru Stoian (to Unirea Dej)
88	MF	CRO	Damjan Đoković (Free agent)
90	FW	SVN	Luka Zahović (to (Slovenia) Maribor)
99	GK	POR	André Moreira (Free agent, previously signed from (Greece) Volos)
—	GK	ROU	Alberto Cimpoeșu (to Afumați, previously on loan at CSM Sighetu Marmației)
—	GK	ROU	Adrian Frănculescu (on loan to Corvinul Hunedoara, previously on loan at CSA Steaua București)
—	DF	BRA	Léo Bolgado (to (Angola) Petro de Luanda, previously on loan at Rapid București)
—	DF	ROU	Antonio Panin (on loan to Sănătatea Cluj)
—	DF	ROU	Ștefan Senciuc (to Rapid București, previously on loan at ASA Târgu Mureș)
—	DF	ROU	Dominik Șoptirean (to Hermannstadt, previously on loan at CSM Slatina)
—	MF	ROU	Cătălin Braicu (on loan to Luceafărul Cluj)
—	MF	ROU	Cătălin Man (on loan to Luceafărul Cluj)
—	MF	NGA	Muhammed Hayatu (to Corvinul Hunedoara, previously on loan)
—	MF	ROU	Mario Tătar (on loan to Luceafărul Cluj)
—	FW	ROU	Tudor Cociș (on loan to Sănătatea Cluj, previously on loan at Politehnica Timișoara)
—	FW	GHA	Emmanuel Mensah (to Gloria Bistrița, previously on loan)
—	FW	NGA	Emmanuel Okoro (to Corvinul Hunedoara, previously on loan)
—	FW	CIV	Theo Yolou (to (Croatia) Hrvace, previously on loan at Minaur Baia Mare)
—		ROU	Nikholas Bumbui (on loan to Transilvania Sport Academy)
—		ROU	Lucas Fechete (on loan to Luceafărul Cluj)
—		ROU	Alexandru Graur (on loan to Luceafărul Cluj)

=== Corvinul Hunedoara ===
In:

No.	Pos.	Nation	Player
1	GK	ROU	Fabio Blaga (loan return from Gloria Bistrița)
5	DF	JOR	Mo Abualnadi (from (Malaysia) Selangor)
9	FW	PER	Renato Espinosa (from Unirea Slobozia)
11	MF	BRA	Roger (from (Brazil) North)
12	GK	ROU	Adrian Frănculescu (on loan from CFR Cluj, previously on loan at CSA Steaua București)
13	DF	ROU	Flavius Iacob (loan return from UTA Arad)
14	MF	NGA	Muhammed Hayatu (from CFR Cluj, previously on loan)
15	DF	SRB	Mihajlo Ivančević (from (Denmark) Lyngby)
22	MF	SVK	Andrej Fábry (from Universitatea Cluj)
29	FW	NGA	Emmanuel Okoro (from CFR Cluj, previously on loan)
32	FW	ARG	Ángel Gillard (from (Chile) Deportes Concepción)
33	GK	ROU	Silviu Drîngă (from Minerul Lupeni)
36	FW	ROU	Denis Zanc (from Viitorul Cluj, previously on loan, previously sold to Viitorul Cluj)
97	MF	ROU	Denis Hrezdac (on loan from UTA Arad)
99	FW	GHA	Emmanuel Yeboah (from (Denmark) Brøndby, previously on loan at (Sweden) Halmstad)

Out:

No.	Pos.	Nation	Player
2	DF	ROU	Szabolcs Kilyén (to FC Bihor)
3	DF	ROU	Ricardo Pădurariu (loan return to FCSB)
6	DF	ROU	Viorel Lică (to Gloria Bistrița)
7	DF	POR	Pedro Albino (to FC Bihor)
8	MF	ROU	Antonio Bradu (to Gloria Bistrița)
9	FW	ROU	Alexandru Buziuc (to Minaur Baia Mare)
11	FW	ROU	Filip Ilie (Free agent)
48	FW	ROU	Luca Bărbulescu (loan return to Dinamo București, later Free agent)
80	MF	ROU	Denis Rența (to CS Dinamo București)
98	DF	ROU	Mihai Velisar (to FC Bihor)
—	GK	ROU	Victor Lință (on loan to CSM Deva)
—	GK	ROU	Andrei Mutuligă (to Păușești Otăsău, previously on loan at CFR Simeria)
—	FW	ROU	Cristian Silvășan (on loan to Unirea Alba Iulia)

=== Csíkszereda ===
In:

No.	Pos.	Nation	Player
4	DF	HUN	Alex Szabó (from (Hungary) Kecskemét)
7	FW	MNE	Dušan Vuković (from (Montenegro) Mladost DG)
9	FW	SVN	Nino Kukovec (on loan from (Slovakia) Dunajská Streda)
11	MF	HUN	Artúr Horváth (on loan from (Hungary) MTK Budapest)
17	FW	HUN	Ádám Czékus (from (Hungary) Kecskemét)
19	MF	ROU	Victor Oniga (from Viitorul Cluj)
20	MF	BRA	Lima (from (Brazil) Atlético Goianiense)
22	DF	HUN	Máté Ódor (on loan from (Hungary) Vasas)
30	MF	HUN	Zsolt Magyar (on loan from (Hungary) Puskás Akadémia)
34	GK	ROU	Márk Karácsony (from Olimpia Satu Mare)
77	MF	ROU	Albert Stahl (from FC Bihor)

Out:

No.	Pos.	Nation	Player
2	DF	KOS	Arian Kabashi (Free agent)
5	DF	ARG	Mariano Bettini (Free agent)
7	MF	SWE	Wilhelm Loeper (to (United Arab Emirates) Dibba Al-Hisn)
9	FW	SVK	Jozef Dolný (to FC Bihor)
11	MF	BRA	Anderson Ceará (to National Bank of Egypt)
17	DF	ROU	Erwin Bloj (to CSM Reșița)
18	MF	HUN	Szabolcs Dusinszki (loan return to (Hungary) Puskás Akadémia)
20	MF	ROU	Efraim Bödő (to (Hungary) Győr)
22	MF	BRA	Gustavinho (loan return to (Brazil) Vila Nova)
25	DF	ROU	Lóránd Bencze (to (Hungary) Puskás Akadémia II)
30	MF	HUN	László Kleinheisler (Free agent)
54	MF	HUN	Dániel Brugger (to (Hungary) Puskás Akadémia)
90	MF	ROU	Szabolcs Szilágyi (on loan to Unirea Slobozia, previously on loan at (Hungary) Szentlőrinc)
97	MF	HUN	Bence Végh (Free agent)
99	FW	HUN	Zoárd Nagy (loan return to (Hungary) Puskás Akadémia)
—	GK	ROU	Michele Antonucci (on loan to Odorheiu Secuiesc)
—	DF	ROU	Lénárd Szőke (to Unirea Dej, previously on loan at Odorheiu Secuiesc)
—	MF	ROU	Szilárd Balogh (on loan to CS Gheorgheni, previously on loan at Odorheiu Secuiesc)

=== Dinamo București ===
In:

No.	Pos.	Nation	Player
5	DF	MKD	Imran Fetai (from (North Macedonia) Shkëndija)
6	MF	BEL	Matthias Verreth (from (Italy) Bari)
8	MF	POR	Diogo Pinto (from (Slovenia) Olimpija Ljubljana)
16	FW	NGA	Godwin Udosen (loan return from CS Dinamo București)
18	FW	ERI	Oliver Hintsa (from (Norway) Sogndal)
19	DF	ROU	Răzvan Radu (from Metalul Buzău)
20	DF	ROU	David Irimia (loan return from Metaloglobus București)
22	DF	ESP	Darío Benavides (from (Belgium) La Louvière)
33	GK	ROU	Costin Ungureanu (loan return from Vulturii Fărcășești)
36	GK	MAR	Alaa Bellaarouch (on loan from (Portugal) Braga)
44	DF	ESP	Martín Pascual (from (Spain) Mirandés)
66	DF	ROU	Ștefan Opriș (from Universitatea Cluj, previously on loan at Politehnica Iași)
97	FW	NED	Dean Zandbergen (from (Netherlands) VVV-Venlo)

Out:

No.	Pos.	Nation	Player
4	DF	TOG	Kennedy Boateng (to (Saudi Arabia) Al Fateh)
5	DF	ROU	Răzvan Pașcalău (to (Italy) Cosenza, previously on loan at CS Dinamo București)
6	MF	ROU	Cristian Licsandru (on loan to Concordia Chiajna)
8	MF	FRA	Eddy Gnahoré (to FCSB)
17	MF	BUL	Georgi Milanov (to (Bulgaria) Botev Plovdiv)
17	FW	UKR	Vadym Kyrychenko (on loan to Cetatea Suceava)
20	FW	ROU	Antonio Bordușanu (to CSM Slatina)
22	MF	ROU	Casian Soare (Free agent, previously on loan at CS Dinamo București)
24	FW	ROU	Adrian Caragea (to (Greece) PAOK)
24	DF	ROU	Mihnea Toader (on loan to 1599 Șelimbăr)
27	DF	COD	Maxime Sivis (to (Russia) Orenburg)
31	DF	ROU	Costin Amzăr (Free agent, previously on loan at (United Arab Emirates) Al Nasr)
32	DF	COD	Jordan Ikoko (Free agent)
55	DF	ROU	Valentin Țicu (to Farul Constanța)
98	MF	ROU	Alexandru Irimia (on loan to Metaloglobus București, previously on loan)
99	FW	ROU	Alexandru Pop (to (Israel) Hapoel Ironi Kiryat Shmona)
—	GK	ROU	Denis Oncescu (on loan to CS Dinamo București)
—	DF	ROU	Andrei Avram (on loan to CS Dinamo București)
—	DF	ROU	Constantin Dobîndă (on loan to Urban Titu)
—	DF	ROU	Matei Marin (to ASA Târgu Mureș, previously on loan at Olimpia Satu Mare)
—	DF	ROU	Raul Oprea (on loan to Dunărea Călărași)
—	MF	NGA	Ahmed Bala (to Crișul Sântandrei, previously on loan at Înainte Modelu)
—	MF	ROU	Ianis Doană (to Politehnica Timișoara, previously signed from CSM Reșița, previously on loan at CSA Steaua București)
—	MF	NGA	Sanusi Hussaini (to Sănătatea Cluj, previously on loan at Minaur Baia Mare)
—	MF	NGA	Peter Maapia (on loan to CS Dinamo București, previously on loan at Gloria Bistrița)
—	MF	ROU	Bogdan Pitulac (on loan to SCM Râmnicu Vâlcea, previously signed from ACS Juniorul 2014)
—	FW	ROU	Luca Bărbulescu (Free agent, previously on loan at Corvinul Hunedoara)
—	FW	ROU	Dennis Dicu (on loan to Blejoi)
—	FW	ROU	Valentin Dumitrache (to Chindia Târgoviște, previously on loan at Metalul Buzău)
—	FW	ROU	Adriano Manole (on loan to CSL Ștefănești, previously signed from FC Argeș)
—	FW	ROU	Raul Rotund (to Concordia Chiajna, previously on loan at ASA Târgu Mureș)

=== Farul Constanța ===
In:

No.	Pos.	Nation	Player
3	DF	ROU	Valentin Țicu (from Dinamo București)
5	DF	FRA	Nabil Aberdin (on loan from (Russia) Sochi, previously on loan at (United Arab Emirates) Al Jazira)
9	FW	KOS	Muhamet Hyseni (on loan from (Denmark) Horsens, previously on loan at (Kosovo) Llapi)
10	MF	FRA	Eddy Sylvestre (from (France) Dunkerque)
13	DF	ROU	Ionuț Cercel (on loan from FCSB)
23	MF	FRA	Tony Njiké (from (France) Quevilly-Rouen)
24	DF	FRA	Sofyane Bouzamoucha (from (France) Rouen)
27	DF	BFA	Hassane Traoré (from (Burkina Faso) USFA)
33	DF	BRA	João Ferreira (loan return from (Portugal) Chaves)
70	MF	BEN	Mattéo Ahlinvi (from (Russia) Arsenal Tula)
77	FW	ROU	David Păcuraru (loan return from Concordia Chiajna)
80	MF	ROU	Nicolas Popescu (loan return from CSA Steaua București)

Out:

No.	Pos.	Nation	Player
5	DF	ROU	Ștefan Duțu (on loan to Popești-Leordeni)
10	FW	ROU	Gabriel Iancu (to Concordia Chiajna)
13	DF	ROU	Costyn Gheorghe (on loan to Gloria Bistrița)
14	MF	ROU	Dan Nechifor (on loan to Pașcani)
15	DF	ROU	Bogdan Țîru (to (Spain) Cultural Leonesa)
16	FW	ROU	Nicolas Constantinescu (on loan to Metaloglobus București, previously on loan from Aerostar Bacău, previously sold to Aerostar Bacău)
19	FW	ROU	Iustin Doicaru (to (Turkey) Çaykur Rizespor)
25	FW	ROU	Jovan Marković (to Botoșani)
27	FW	ROU	Ionuț Cojocaru (on loan to (Malta) Sliema Wanderers)
31	FW	ROU	Alexandru Ișfan (to (Spain) Oviedo)
77	MF	POR	Diogo Ramalho (to (Indonesia) Persebaya Surabaya)
95	DF	ROU	Gabriel Dănuleasă (to (Slovakia) Bytča)
—	GK	ROU	David Dincă (to Botoșani, previously on loan at CS Dinamo București)
—	GK	ROU	Valentin Frățilă (on loan to SCM Râmnicu Vâlcea, previously on loan at AFC Câmpulung Muscel)
—	GK	ROU	Vlad Rafailă (to Universitatea Cluj, previously on loan at (Spain) Betis B)
—	DF	ROU	Mario Aioanei (to Dunărea Călărași, previously on loan at Academica Balș)
—	DF	ROU	Gabriel Buta (Free agent, previously on loan at CSM Slatina)
—	DF	ROU	Ricardo Căldăraru (on loan to Metalul Buzău)
—	DF	ROU	Darius Grosu (to CSL Ștefănești, previously on loan at AFC Câmpulung Muscel)
—	DF	ROU	Rareș Munteanu (to CSM Vaslui, previously on loan at Ceahlăul Piatra Neamț)
—	MF	ROU	Andreas Birbic (to Minerul Lupeni, previously on loan at 1599 Șelimbăr)
—	MF	ROU	David Pătru (on loan to CSL Ștefănești)
—	MF	ROU	Eric Somandru (on loan to Tunari)
—	FW	ROU	Matei Berchez (on loan to Bihor Oradea)
—	FW	ROU	Alin Cocoș (to Alexandria, previously on loan at CS Dinamo București)

=== FC Argeș ===
In:

No.	Pos.	Nation	Player
9	FW	CGO	Gabriel Charpentier (from (Poland) Cracovia)
18	FW	ROU	Daniel Sandu (from Oțelul Galați)
20	FW	ROU	Patrick Dulcea (loan return from Unirea Slobozia)
25	DF	POR	Tiago Gonçalves (from (Hungary) Újpest, previously on loan at (Italy) Mantova)
29	MF	ROU	Gabriel Gheorghe (from Rapid București)
69	DF	NGA	Oluwatobiloba Alagbe (from (Greece) Asteras Tripolis)
77	GK	MNE	Igor Nikić (from (Spain) Mirandés)
92	FW	FRA	Taylor Luvambo (from (France) Le Mans)
96	FW	ROU	Silviu Balaure (from Hermannstadt)
—	MF	ROU	Robert Popescu (loan return from Hermannstadt, previously on loan at CSA Steaua București)

Out:

No.	Pos.	Nation	Player
4	DF	CYP	Evagoras Antoniou (to (Cyprus) AEL Limassol, previously signed from (Cyprus) APOEL)
5	DF	ROU	Marius Briceag (to Chindia Târgoviște)
8	MF	ROU	Eduard Cotea (on loan to Unirea Dej, previously signed from Inter Ilfov)
9	FW	ROU	Mihai Roman (to Voluntari, previously on loan)
14	DF	ROU	Andrei Dinu (to Jiul Petroșani)
21	FW	TUN	Adel Bettaieb (to (Tunisia) Espérance de Tunis, later signed by (Morocco) Raja Casablanca)
24	MF	CRO	Jakov Blagaić (to (Croatia) Rudeš)
25	MF	JPN	Takayuki Seto (to ARO Muscelul Câmpulung)
33	GK	ROU	Luca Crăciun (on loan to SCM Râmnicu Vâlcea)
42	FW	NED	Kevin Brobbey (to (Cyprus) Krasava Ypsonas)
82	DF	ROU	Antonio Marin (on loan to Oxigen București)
98	FW	ROU	Adriano Manole (to Dinamo București)
—	MF	ROU	Alexandru Dinoci (on loan to Unirea Bascov)
—	FW	ROU	Eric Nistor (on loan to SCM Râmnicu Vâlcea, previously on loan at AFC Câmpulung Muscel)
—	FW	ROU	Mario Oprea (on loan to ARO Muscelul Câmpulung)
—	FW	CMR	Franck Tchassem (to CSM Reșița, previously on loan)

=== FCSB ===
In:

No.	Pos.	Nation	Player
4	DF	ROU	Ricardo Pădurariu (loan return from Corvinul Hunedoara)
8	MF	FRA	Eddy Gnahoré (from Dinamo București)
9	FW	KOS	Meriton Korenica (from CFR Cluj)
10	FW	ROU	Denis Drăguș (from (Turkey) Trabzonspor, previously on loan at (Turkey) Gaziantep)
14	FW	CMR	Arnold Garita (on loan from (China) Shenzhen Juniors)
20	FW	ROU	Dennis Politic (loan return from Hermannstadt)
21	DF	COD	Dylan Batubinsika (from (Greece) AEL)
28	FW	ALG	Aymen Boutoutaou (from (France) Sochaux)
73	MF	CRO	Karlo Muhar (from CFR Cluj)
77	DF	ROU	Luca Stancu (from Hermannstadt)
97	DF	MTQ	Ronny Labonne (from (France) Caen)

Out:

No.	Pos.	Nation	Player
4	DF	BIH	Daniel Graovac (to Rapid București)
9	FW	ROU	Daniel Bîrligea (on loan to (Italy) Frosinone)
10	FW	ROU	Florin Tănase (to (Cyprus) Omonia)
12	DF	BEN	David Kiki (to Voluntari)
16	MF	ROU	Mihai Lixandru (to (Saudi Arabia) Al Fateh)
21	MF	ROU	Vlad Chiricheș (Free agent)
23	DF	ROU	Ionuț Cercel (on loan to Farul Constanța)
27	MF	ROU	Darius Olaru (to (Belgium) Union Saint-Gilloise)
28	DF	ROU	Alexandru Pantea (on loan to (Greece) Levadiakos)
29	MF	ROU	Laurențiu Vlăsceanu (to CSA Steaua București, previously on loan at Unirea Slobozia)
38	GK	CZE	Lukáš Zima (to Petrolul Ploiești)
42	MF	UGA	Baba Alhassan (to (Turkey) Mardin 1969)
93	FW	SEN	Mamadou Thiam (to (Turkey) Sarıyer)
—	GK	ROU	Alexandru Maxim (to Universitatea Craiova, previously on loan at Voluntari)
—	DF	ROU	Raul Alecsandroaie (on loan to Metalul Buzău)
—	DF	ROU	Luca Galdea (on loan to ASA Târgu Mureș)
—	DF	ROU	Matei Manolache (to Cetatea Suceava, previously on loan at Gloria Bistrița)
—	MF	ROU	Codruț Călin (on loan to Progresul Fundulea)
—	MF	ROU	Eric Damașcan (on loan to Popești-Leordeni)
—	MF	ROU	Andrei Panait (on loan to Înainte Modelu)
—	MF	ROU	Mario Petre (to Înainte Modelu, previously on loan at Popești-Leordeni)
—	FW	ROU	Mario Preda (to Botoșani, previously on loan at Râmnicu Vâlcea)
—	FW	ROU	Robert Necșulescu (on loan to Unirea Slobozia, previously on loan at Chindia Târgoviște)

=== Oțelul Galați ===
In:

No.	Pos.	Nation	Player
3	DF	GRE	Giannis Christopoulos (from (Greece) OFI)
5	DF	CIV	Habib Sylla (from (Portugal) União Leiria)
7	FW	CPV	João Paulino (Free agent)
8	MF	POR	Rafael Brito (from (Portugal) Casa Pia)
11	FW	GNB	Zé Turbo (from (Russia) Pari Nizhny Novgorod, previously on loan at (Israel) Maccabi Bnei Reineh)
13	GK	ROU	Mario Contra (from Chindia Târgoviște)
28	DF	POR	Miguel Silva (from Universitatea Cluj)
30	MF	ROU	Matei Frunză (loan return from Cetatea Suceava)
39	MF	MDA	Teodor Lungu (from Unirea Slobozia)
44	DF	CAN	Dominick Zator (from (Poland) Arka Gdynia)
77	FW	ROU	Viorel Bălănică (from Sport Team București)

Out:

No.	Pos.	Nation	Player
8	MF	POR	João Lameira (to Universitatea Craiova)
11	FW	ROU	Ștefan Bană (loan return to Universitatea Craiova, later signed by (Qatar) Al Kharaitiyat)
14	DF	ROU	Andrei Rus (to CS Dinamo București)
20	FW	ROU	Daniel Sandu (to FC Argeș)
22	GK	ROU	Gabriel Ursu (to CSM Reșița)
23	MF	ROU	Cristian Chira (to CSM Reșița)
31	MF	CRO	Diego Živulić (to (Croatia) Rudeš, later signed by (India) East Bengal)
32	GK	ROU	Iustin Popescu (to CSM Reșița)
80	MF	ANG	Bruno Paz (to (Cyprus) Olympiakos Nicosia)
96	FW	CRO	Gabriel Debeljuh (to (Lithuania) Kauno Žalgiris)
97	DF	BRA	Conrado (to (Poland) Radomiak Radom)
99	FW	BRA	Luan Campos ( (Israel) Hapoel Ramat Gan)
—	GK	ROU	Giulio Munteanu (on loan to Sporting Liești)
—	MF	ROU	David Butuc (on loan to CSM Adjud 1946)

=== Petrolul Ploiești ===
In:

No.	Pos.	Nation	Player
7	FW	POR	Rodrigo Martins (from (Portugal) Lusitânia)
8	MF	ARG	Lucho Vega (from (Portugal) União Leiria)
9	FW	ENG	Dan Nlundulu (from (Scotland) St Mirren)
10	MF	CRC	Alejandro Bran (from (Costa Rica) Alajuelense)
12	GK	ROU	Ștefan Georgescu (from Teleajenul Vălenii de Munte)
18	DF	AZE	Cəlal Hüseynov (from (Bulgaria) Arda Kardzhali)
19	FW	POR	Léo Teixeira (from (Portugal) Felgueiras)
22	DF	ROU	Mark Țuțu (from Ceahlăul Piatra Neamț, previously on loan at UTA Arad)
24	DF	NED	Adam Zaian (from (Netherlands) MVV Maastricht)
38	GK	CZE	Lukáš Zima (from FCSB)
66	DF	ROU	Tiberiu Căpușă (from Hermannstadt)
71	DF	COD	Breston Malula (from (Switzerland) Stade Lausanne Ouchy)
80	MF	ROU	Mario Ioniță (loan return from Afumați)
98	FW	ROU	Robert Jerdea (from CSM Reșița)
99	MF	NGA	Israel Dele (from (Czech Republic) Sigma Olomouc)
—	DF	TUR	Atay Akgün (from (Turkey) Boluspor)

Out:

No.	Pos.	Nation	Player
1	GK	ROU	Raul Bălbărău (to (Israel) Bnei Sakhnin)
2	DF	POR	Diogo Rodrigues (Free agent)
5	MF	CMR	Danel Dongmo (to (Portugal) Nacional)
6	MF	FIN	Tommi Jyry (to (Finland) KuPS)
7	FW	ROU	Gheorghe Grozav (to Corona Brașov)
8	MF	ROU	Alexandru Mateiu (to Corona Brașov)
9	FW	ROU	Adi Chică-Roșă (to Voluntari)
11	MF	ROU	Valentin Gheorghe (Free agent)
11	DF	ROU	Cătălin Tolea (to CSA Steaua București, previously on loan at Voluntari)
15	MF	FRA	Brahima Doukansy (to (France) Aubagne Air Bel)
17	FW	KAZ	Abat Aymbetov (to (Kazakhstan) Aktobe)
19	FW	GRE	Konstantinos Doumtsios (to (Greece) PAS Pyrgos, previously on loan at Chindia Târgoviște)
22	DF	ROU	Cristian Ignat (loan return to Rapid București, later signed by CFR Cluj)
24	DF	POR	Ricardinho (to (Portugal) Lusitânia)
25	DF	CMR	Jérôme Onguéné (Free agent, previously on loan at (Turkey) Eyüpspor)
28	FW	ESP	Rafinha (to (Andorra) Inter Club d'Escaldes)
33	MF	ROU	Mario Dudu (to Tricolorul Breaza)
36	MF	ROU	Alin Boțogan (Free agent)
41	GK	AUT	Stefan Krell (Free agent)
42	DF	POR	Guilherme (to (Portugal) Lusitânia)
44	MF	ROU	Lucian Dumitriu (to Corona Brașov)
55	MF	ROU	Rareș Pop (loan return to Rapid București)
64	DF	ROU	Bogdan Marian (to Unirea Slobozia)
69	DF	BEN	Yohan Roche (to (Greece) Iraklis)
71	DF	CRO	Franjo Prce (to (Kazakhstan) Atyrau)
77	MF	GHA	Nana Boateng (to (Cyprus) Krasava Ypsonas)
87	FW	ROU	David Ilie (on loan to Oxigen București, previously on loan at Hermannstadt)
88	MF	ROU	Marco Dulca (to (Turkey) Kayserispor)
97	MF	ROU	Augustin Dumitrache (on loan to Blejoi)
—	GK	ROU	Sebastian Pârnău (on loan to CSO Plopeni, previously on loan at Teleajenul Vălenii de Munte)
—	GK	ROU	Ștefan Rudacovschi (on loan to Blejoi)
—	DF	ROU	Adrian Chivu (to Teleajenul Vălenii de Munte, previously on loan)
—	DF	ROU	Denis Draghia (on loan to Teleajenul Vălenii de Munte)
—	DF	ROU	Denis Radu (to (Turkey) Kayserispor, previously on loan at (Turkey) Eyüpspor)
—	DF	ROU	Alexandru Stănică (to Unirea Slobozia, previously on loan at Tunari)
—	MF	ROU	Vladimir Badea (on loan to Odorheiu Secuiesc, previously on loan at Tunari until 30 June 2026)
—	MF	ROU	Alexandru Burcilă (on loan to Băicoi)
—	MF	ROU	Vlad Stancovici (to Metaloglobus București, previously on loan at Metalul Buzău)
—	FW	ROU	Mihail Cursaru (on loan to Teleajenul Vălenii de Munte)
—	FW	ROU	Sebastian Guiu (on loan to Teleajenul Vălenii de Munte)

=== Rapid București ===
In:

No.	Pos.	Nation	Player
3	DF	BIH	Daniel Graovac (from FCSB)
7	FW	LBR	Mohammed Kamara (from CFR Cluj)
9	FW	SUI	Filip Stojilković (on loan from (Italy) Pisa)
17	DF	ROU	Ștefan Senciuc (from CFR Cluj, previously on loan at ASA Târgu Mureș)
18	DF	GAM	Sheriff Sinyan (from CFR Cluj)
22	MF	MNE	Vladan Bubanja (on loan from (Russia) Orenburg, previously on loan at (Croatia) Osijek)
27	DF	GHA	Ebenezer Annan (on loan from (France) Saint-Étienne)
28	MF	SRB	Luka Gojković (loan return from UTA Arad)
42	DF	SVN	Alin Kumer Čelik (on loan from (Italy) Genoa)
44	MF	BFA	Chec Bebel Doumbia (on loan from (Italy) Genoa)
55	MF	ROU	Rareș Pop (loan return from Petrolul Ploiești)
66	DF	BFA	Latif Ouedraogo (on loan from (Italy) Genoa)
68	GK	ROU	Răzvan Ducan (from Unirea Alba Iulia)
77	FW	ROU	Jason Kodor (from (Italy) Lecce)
79	MF	CIV	Eric Ange Tape (from (Ivory Coast) Olympic Sport Abobo)
90	FW	SVK	Timotej Jambor (loan return from (Poland) Śląsk Wrocław)
98	FW	ROU	Raul Stanciu (loan return from Tunari)
99	GK	ROU	Bogdan Ungureanu (loan return from Sepsi OSK)
—	FW	FRA	Antoine Baroan (loan return from (Portugal) AVS)

Out:

No.	Pos.	Nation	Player
1	GK	MKD	Dejan Iliev (Free agent)
3	DF	ROU	Robert Bădescu (to UTA Arad, previously on loan at Metaloglobus București)
4	DF	BRA	Léo Bolgado (loan return to CFR Cluj, later signed by (Angola) Petro de Luanda)
4	DF	ROU	Cristian Ignat (to CFR Cluj, previously on loan at Petrolul Ploiești)
7	FW	BIH	Elvir Koljić (to (Greece) Iraklis)
11	FW	SRB	Borisav Burmaz (Free agent)
14	MF	SVK	Jakub Hromada (to (Greece) Iraklis)
17	MF	NOR	Tobias Christensen (to (Poland) Wieczysta Kraków)
18	MF	CIV	Kader Keïta (to (Saudi Arabia) Al-Riyadh)
24	DF	ROU	Andrei Borza (to (Turkey) Çorum)
27	MF	KOS	Drilon Hazrollaj (on loan to (Albania) Tirana)
30	FW	ROU	Daniel Paraschiv (loan return to (Spain) Oviedo, later signed by (Israel) Bnei Sakhnin)
31	GK	ROU	Adrian Briciu (to Concordia Chiajna)
69	GK	SUI	Benjamin Siegrist (Free agent, previously on loan at (Italy) Genoa)
88	MF	ROU	Omar El Sawy (on loan to UTA Arad, previously on loan at Universitatea Cluj)
96	MF	ROU	Gabriel Gheorghe (to FC Argeș)
—	GK	ROU	Patrick Strizu (on loan to Afumați, previously on loan at ARO Muscelul Câmpulung)
—	DF	GHA	Mohamed Bakayoko (on loan to CSL Ștefănești, previously signed from Viitorul Arad)
—	DF	ROU	Robert Banu (on loan to Progresul Mogoșoaia)
—	DF	ROU	David Todoran (to Voluntari, later on loan to Unirea Slobozia)
—	MF	ROU	Sebastian Banu (on loan to Concordia Chiajna)
—	MF	CPV	Diogo Mendes (Free agent)
—	MF	ROU	Andi Seceleanu (on loan to Oxigen București)
—	MF	ROU	Luca Stoica (on loan to Metaloglobus București)
—	FW	ROU	Andrei Antonescu (on loan to Unirea Dej)
—	FW	ROU	Mark Moruț (to FC Bihor)
—	FW	ROU	Antonio Preda (on loan to Progresul Spartac București)
—	FW	ROU	Ștefan Todoran (to Voluntari, later on loan to Metaloglobus București)

=== Sepsi OSK ===
In:

No.	Pos.	Nation	Player
2	DF	BRA	Gustavo Cascardo (from (Bulgaria) Arda Kardzhali)
4	DF	FRA	Setigui Karamoko (from (France) Pau FC)
5	DF	ROU	Bogdan Vătăjelu (from FC Bihor)
17	MF	ROU	Doru Andrei (from Voluntari)
19	MF	ROU	Giovani Ghimfuș (loan return from Metaloglobus București)
22	MF	CIV	Aboubakar Keita (from (Hungary) Diósgyőr)
28	MF	FRA	Victor Daguin (from (Belgium) Lierse)
30	MF	ROU	Ákos Nistor (loan return from Kecskemét)
31	DF	MRI	Lindsay Rose (from (Greece) Aris)
70	FW	NGA	Funsho Bamgboye (from (Turkey) Hatayspor)
91	GK	ROU	David Lazar (from Hermannstadt)

Out:

No.	Pos.	Nation	Player
4	DF	ROU	Denis Haruț (to Voluntari)
17	DF	ROU	Darius Oroian (to (Slovenia) Mura)
22	FW	CGO	Mavis Tchibota (to (Israel) Hapoel Acre)
26	DF	ROU	Gabriel Mihoreanu (to Afumați)
59	DF	ROU	Alin Techereș (loan return to Universitatea Cluj)
98	GK	ROU	Hunor Gedő (on loan to Săcele)
99	GK	ROU	Bogdan Ungureanu (loan return to Rapid București)
—	DF	ROU	Radu Ghimbovschi (on loan to Viitorul Onești)
—	MF	ROU	Andrei Bartalis (on loan to Săcele)
—	MF	ROU	Milán Nikula (on loan to Carpați Covasna)
—	MF	CRO	Dino Skorup (to (Georgia (country)) Torpedo Kutaisi, previously on loan at (Bosnia and Herzegovina) Borac Banja Luka)
—	MF	ROU	Ottó Székeli (on loan to Carpați Covasna)
—	FW	ROU	Marius Coman (to UTA Arad, previously on loan)
—	FW	SRB	Mihajlo Nešković (to (Serbia) TSC, previously on loan at (Montenegro) Budućnost)
—	FW	ROU	Norbert Varga (on loan to KSE Târgu Secuiesc)

=== Universitatea Cluj ===
In:

No.	Pos.	Nation	Player
5	MF	ROU	Luca Szimionaș (from (Italy) Hellas Verona)
12	MF	NGA	Friday Adams (from Botoșani)
14	FW	ROU	Marius Ștefănescu (from (Turkey) Konyaspor)
18	MF	POR	Pedro Pinho (from (Portugal) Chaves)
20	DF	SUI	Noah Loosli (from (Germany) VfL Bochum)
21	GK	ROU	Denis Moldovan (loan return from CS Dinamo București)
22	DF	MTQ	Florent Poulolo (from UTA Arad)
25	FW	SWE	Alibek Aliyev (from CFR Cluj)
34	GK	ROU	Vlad Rafailă (from Farul Constanța, previously on loan at (Spain) Betis B)
46	GK	CYP	Neofytos Michail (from (Cyprus) Pafos)
59	DF	ROU	Alin Techereș (loan return from Sepsi OSK)

Out:

No.	Pos.	Nation	Player
4	DF	ROU	Andrei Coubiș (to (England) Lincoln City, previously signed from (Italy) Sampdoria, previously on loan from Sampdoria)
9	FW	ROU	Atanas Trică (to (Cyprus) AEK Larnaca)
11	MF	ITA	Alessandro Murgia (to (Italy) Guidonia Montecelio)
13	MF	SVK	Andrej Fábry (to Corvinul Hunedoara)
14	DF	ROU	Alin Toșca (Retired)
16	DF	SUI	Jasper van der Werff (to (Switzerland) Aarau)
18	MF	ROU	Andrei Artean (to Politehnica Timișoara)
20	MF	ROU	Alexandru Bota (on loan to FC Bihor, previously on loan at Botoșani)
20	FW	NGA	Ibuchi Chukwu (on loan to Gloria Bistrița, previously signed from Gloria Bistrița)
21	FW	ROU	Ioan Bârstan (to Hermannstadt, previously on loan)
28	DF	POR	Miguel Silva (to Oțelul Galați)
30	GK	LTU	Edvinas Gertmonas (to (Switzerland) Servette)
31	MF	ROU	Matei Moraru (to Inter Sibiu)
50	MF	NGA	Raji Ayomide (on loan to Popești-Leordeni, previously on loan at CSM Olimpia Satu Mare)
88	MF	ROU	Omar El Sawy (loan return to Rapid București, later on loan to UTA Arad)
93	FW	MDA	Virgiliu Postolachi (to (Australia) Brisbane Roar)
—	GK	ROU	Iustin Chirilă (on loan to FC Bihor, previously on loan at CSM Reșița)
—	DF	ROU	Tudor Ivan (to 1599 Șelimbăr, previously on loan)
—	DF	ROU	Ștefan Opriș (to Dinamo București, previously on loan at Politehnica Iași)
—	DF	ROU	Nicholas Pop (on loan to Dumbrăvița, previously on loan at Bihorul Beiuș)
—	MF	ROU	Ovidiu Buia (on loan to 1599 Șelimbăr)
—	MF	ROU	Paul Crișan (to Sănătatea Cluj, previously on loan)
—	MF	ROU	Vlad Lambru (on loan to SCM Zalău, previously on loan at CSM Olimpia Satu Mare, previously on loan at Unirea Alba Iulia)
—	MF	ROU	Luca Nagy (to Metalul Buzău, previously on loan at SCM Zalău)
—	MF	ROU	Alex Orban (on loan to FC Bihor)
—	MF	ROU	Tudor Pojar (to CSM Olimpia Satu Mare, later signed by Metaloglobus București, previously on loan at Politehnica Iași)
—	MF	ROU	Antonio Suciu (on loan to Gloria Bistrița, previously on loan at Ceahlăul Piatra Neamț)
—	MF	ROU	Mario Tout (to CSM Sighetu Marmației, previously on loan at ASA Târgu Mureș)
—	MF	ROU	Vlad Tudorache (on loan to Blejoi)
—	MF	ROU	Răzvan Vaida (on loan to Unirea Alba Iulia)
—	MF	ROU	Tudor Zoicaș (on loan to Metalul Buzău)
—	FW	ROU	Eneas Horvat (on loan to 1599 Șelimbăr)
—	FW	NGA	Quadri Taiwo (on loan to Popești-Leordeni, previously on loan at CSM Reșița)

=== Universitatea Craiova ===
In:

No.	Pos.	Nation	Player
1	GK	ROU	Alexandru Maxim (from FCSB, previously on loan at Voluntari)
5	DF	FRA	Baptiste Roux (on loan from (Serbia) TSC)
16	MF	POR	João Lameira (from Oțelul Galați)
19	FW	CPV	Heri Tavares (from (Israel) Maccabi Netanya)
22	FW	FRA	Simon Elisor (from (Portugal) Famalicão)
27	FW	ROU	David Barbu (loan return from CSA Steaua București)
31	DF	JAM	Ronaldo Webster (from (North Macedonia) Shkëndija)
90	GK	ROU	Răzvan Sava (from (Italy) Udinese)
—	MF	ROU	Eric Călugărescu (loan return from CSA Steaua București)

Out:

No.	Pos.	Nation	Player
1	GK	ROU	Silviu Lung Jr. (Free agent)
2	DF	ROU	Florin Ștefan (to (Turkey) Gaziantep)
5	MF	GEO	Anzor Mekvabishvili (to (United States) Chicago Fire)
14	MF	FRA	Lyes Houri (to (Georgia (country)) Dinamo Tbilisi)
15	DF	CRO	Juraj Badelj (to (Cyprus) Aris Limassol)
19	DF	ROU	Vasile Mogoș (to (Italy) Bari)
25	DF	ROU	Darius Fălcușan (on loan to Concordia Chiajna)
32	GK	POR	João Gonçalves (to (Portugal) Nacional)
—	DF	ROU	Florin Gașpăr (on loan to Chindia Târgoviște, previously on loan at CSM Reșița)
—	MF	ROU	Robert Petculescu (to Voluntari, previously on loan)
—	MF	ROU	Robert Ristoiu (on loan to Unirea Slobozia)
—	FW	ROU	Ștefan Bană (to (Qatar) Al Kharaitiyat, previously on loan at Oțelul Galați)
—	FW	ROU	Dan Spătaru (on loan to Politehnica Timișoara)

=== UTA Arad ===
In:

No.	Pos.	Nation	Player
1	GK	CPV	Márcio Rosa (from (Bulgaria) Montana)
2	DF	ROU	Andrei Dorobanțu (on loan from Unirea Slobozia)
6	MF	BUL	Antoni Ivanov (from (Hungary) Szentlőrinc)
7	FW	KOS	Ismet Sinani (from (Italy) Bra)
9	FW	ROU	Marius Coman (from Sepsi OSK, previously on loan)
14	MF	RWA	Samuel Gueulette (from (Belgium) La Louvière)
15	DF	FRA	Peter Ouaneh (from (France) Laval)
22	DF	ROU	Robert Bădescu (from Rapid București, previously on loan at Metaloglobus București)
26	MF	ROU	Răzvan Oaidă (Free agent)
42	MF	ROU	Omar El Sawy (on loan from Rapid București, previously on loan at Universitatea Cluj)
77	FW	FRA	Jayson Papeau (from Unirea Slobozia)
80	MF	ROU	Alexi Pitu (from (Denmark) Vejle)

Out:

No.	Pos.	Nation	Player
2	DF	ROU	Mark Țuțu (loan return to Ceahlăul Piatra Neamț, later signed by Petrolul Ploiești)
6	DF	MTQ	Florent Poulolo (to Universitatea Cluj)
12	GK	ROU	Lucas Roșu (to Progresul Pecica)
13	DF	ROU	Flavius Iacob (loan return to Corvinul Hunedoara)
15	MF	NGA	Ime Ndon (to Metaloglobus București)
17	MF	ROU	Luca Mihai (to (Italy) Catania, later Free agent)
18	MF	SRB	Luka Gojković (loan return to Rapid București)
22	FW	ROU	Adrian Dragoș (on loan to Progresul Pecica)
23	MF	ROU	Ovidiu Popescu (to Politehnica Timișoara)
24	DF	ROU	Alexandru Hodoșan (on loan to Progresul Pecica, previously on loan at Dumbrăvița)
28	DF	CRO	Marko Stolnik (to (Croatia) Rudeš)
30	MF	BEL	Benjamin Van Durmen (Free agent)
96	GK	ROU	Árpád Tordai (to CFR Cluj)
97	MF	ROU	Denis Hrezdac (on loan to Corvinul Hunedoara)
98	FW	ROU	David Ciubăncan (on loan to Minaur Baia Mare)
—	GK	ROU	Mark Cioară (on loan to Crișul Sântandrei)
—	DF	ROU	Darian Ancateu (on loan to Unirea Sântana)
—	DF	ROU	Eric Bărbat (on loan to Minerul Lupeni)
—	DF	ROU	Alexandru Budihală (on loan to Unirea Sântana, previously on loan at Progresul Pecica)
—	DF	ROU	Tudor Telcean (to Hermannstadt, previously on loan at 1599 Șelimbăr)
—	MF	ROU	Darius Burcă (on loan to Unirea Sântana)
—	MF	ROU	Alessio Calotă (to Minaur Baia Mare, previously on loan at Dumbrăvița)
—	MF	ROU	Fabiano Cibi (to Dumbrăvița, previously on loan)
—	MF	ROU	Alexandru Crainic (to Progresul Pecica, previously on loan)
—	MF	ROU	Mario Salka (to Unirea Alba Iulia, previously on loan at Gloria Bistrița)
—	FW	ROU	Robert Baba (on loan to Progresul Pecica)
—	FW	ROU	Lucas Câmpan (on loan to Unirea Slobozia, previously on loan at Gloria Bistrița)
—	FW	ROU	Luca Indreica (to Progresul Pecica, previously on loan)

=== Voluntari ===
In:

No.	Pos.	Nation	Player
4	DF	MDA	Daniel Dumbrăvanu (from CFR Cluj, previously on loan)
5	DF	ROU	Denis Haruț (from Sepsi OSK)
12	GK	ROU	Bogdan Ștefan (loan return from Unirea Alba Iulia)
21	MF	ROU	Robert Petculescu (from Universitatea Craiova, previously on loan)
22	MF	POR	Nuno Rodrigues (from (Azerbaijan) Araz-Naxçıvan)
23	DF	CRO	Matej Mamić (from (Slovenia) Radomlje)
25	DF	BEN	David Kiki (from FCSB)
29	FW	ROU	Adi Chică-Roșă (from Petrolul Ploiești)
31	GK	SVN	Metod Jurhar (from (Slovenia) Koper)
90	FW	ROU	Mihai Roman (from FC Argeș, previously on loan)

Out:

No.	Pos.	Nation	Player
1	GK	ROU	Alexandru Maxim (loan return to FCSB, later signed by Universitatea Craiova)
6	MF	ROU	Darius Ghindovean (on loan to Concordia Chiajna, previously signed from Politehnica Iași)
7	MF	ROU	Daniel Toma (to SCM Râmnicu Vâlcea)
11	MF	ROU	Doru Andrei (to Sepsi OSK)
18	DF	ROU	Cătălin Tolea (loan return to Petrolul Ploiești, later signed by CSA Steaua București)
29	DF	FRA	Steven N'Guessan (Free agent)
41	DF	ROU	Ștefan Ioniță (on loan to CSL Ștefănești)
77	FW	SVK	Adam Nemec (to (Austria) SC Höflein)
80	MF	ROU	Florian Haită (on loan to FC Bihor)
98	MF	ROU	Răzvan Neag (loan return to Galaxy Timișoara, later on loan to Zalău)
—	GK	ROU	Cristian Hodor (on loan to Voința Crevedia)
—	DF	ROU	David Todoran (on loan to Unirea Slobozia, previously signed from Rapid București)
—	MF	ROU	Albert Ghiță (on loan to Progresul Drăgănești)
—	FW	ROU	Ștefan Todoran (on loan to Metaloglobus București, previously signed from Rapid București)
—		ROU	Codruț Șerban (on loan to Progresul Mogoșoaia)

== See also ==
- 2026–27 Liga I
