= 2026–27 FC Botoșani season =

FC Botoșani
2026–27 season
- Stadium: Botoșani Municipal Stadium
- Superliga: Pre-season
- Cupa României: Pre-season

The 2026–27 season is the 26th in the history of Fotbal Club Botoșani and the 14th consecutive season in Liga I. The club will also compete in the Cupa României.

== Transfers ==
=== In ===
Pos.	Player	Transferred from	Fee	Date	Source
MF	(Brazil) Gabriel Gama	(Qatar) Mesaimeer	Free	1 July 2026	
GK	(Romania) Ion Gurău	(Albania) KF Bylis	Free	1 July 2026	
MF	(Republic of Ireland) Roland Idowu	(Scotland) St Mirren	€220,000	21 August 2026	
FW	(Romania) Jovan Marković	(Romania) Farul Constanța	Free	15 July 2026	

=== Out ===
Pos.	Player	Transferred to	Fee	Date	Source
DF	(Romania) Alexandru Bota	(Romania) Universitatea Cluj	Loan return	30 June 2026	
MF	(Romania) Gabriel David	(Romania) Cetatea Suceava	Loan	1 July 2026	
FW	(Romania) Antonio Dumitru		End of contract	1 July 2026	
MF	(Angola) Aldaír Ferreira		End of contract	1 July 2026	
GK	(Bosnia and Herzegovina) Luka Kukić		End of contract	1 July 2026	
FW	(Argentina) Enzo López		End of contract	1 July 2026	
DF	(Slovenia) Michael Pavlović	(Armenia) FC Noah	End of contract	1 July 2026	
DF	(Nigeria) Friday Adams	(Romania) Universitatea Cluj	End of contract	1 July 2026	

== Pre-season and friendlies ==
25 June 2026 Friendly	Botoșani (Romania)	1–0	(Scotland) Dunfermline Athletic	Bulgaria
15:00 UTC+2

27 June 2026 Friendly	Botoșani (Romania)	1–3	(Albania) Egnatia	Bulgaria
17:30 UTC+3

1 July 2026 Friendly	Lokomotiv Sofia (Bulgaria)	v	(Romania) Botoșani	Bulgaria
14:00

1 July 2026 Friendly	Slavia Sofia (Bulgaria)	4–0	(Romania) Botoșani	Bansko, Bulgaria
14:30	Emil Stoev 6'; Roberto Raicev 43'; Umaro Balde 53'; 85' (o.g.)

4 July 2026 Friendly	Botoșani (Romania)	2–2	(Bulgaria) Ludogorets Razgrad	Bulgaria
17:00	18', 90'		11'; 15'

== Competitions ==
=== Overall record ===
Competition	First match	Last match	Starting round	Record							
Competition	First match	Last match	Starting round	Pld	W	D	L	GF	GA	GD	Win %
Superliga	17 July 2026		Matchday 1	1	0	1	0	2	2	+0	0.00
Cupa României				0	0	0	0	0	0	+0	—
Total				1	0	1	0	2	2	+0	0.00

Source: Competitions

=== Superliga ===
Pos	Team	Pld	W	D	L	GF	GA	GD	Pts	Qualification
10	UTA Arad	10	3	3	4	14	14	0	12	Advances to Play-out
11	FCSB	10	3	3	4	13	17	−4	12	Advances to Play-out
12	Botoșani	10	2	5	3	14	12	+2	11	Advances to Play-out
13	Argeș Pitești	10	3	2	5	6	10	−4	11	Advances to Play-out
14	Oțelul Galați	10	2	4	4	11	15	−4	10	Advances to Play-out

Updated to match(es) played on 21 September 2026. Source: LPF (in Romanian)
Rules for classification: 1) Points; 2) Head-to-head points; 3) Head-to-head goal difference; 4) Head-to-head goals scored; 5) Goal difference; 6) Goals scored; 7) Play-off.

Pos	Team	Pld	W	D	L	GF	GA	GD	Pts	Qualification	1	2	3	4	5	6
1	1	0	0	0	0	0	0	0	0	Qualification to Champions League first qualifying round						
2	2	0	0	0	0	0	0	0	0	Qualification to Conference League second qualifying round						
3	3	0	0	0	0	0	0	0	0	Qualification to European competition play-offs						
4	4	0	0	0	0	0	0	0	0							
5	5	0	0	0	0	0	0	0	0							
6	6	0	0	0	0	0	0	0	0							

Source: LPF (in Romanian)
Legend: Blue = home team win; Yellow = draw; Red = away team win.
Rules for classification: 1) Points; 2) Points without rounding; 3) Points in the regular season; 4) Head-to-head points; 5) Head-to-head goal difference; 6) Head-to-head goals scored; 7) Goal difference; 8) Goals scored; 9) Play-off (only if needed to decide champion or teams for UEFA competitions). (Note: only criteria 7 and 8 are applied to establish the classification during the competition.

Pos	Team	Pld	W	D	L	GF	GA	GD	Pts	Qualification or relegation	7	8	9	10	11	12	13	14	15	16
7	7	0	0	0	0	0	0	0	0	Qualification to European competition play-offs										
8	8	0	0	0	0	0	0	0	0	Qualification to European competition play-offs										
9	9	0	0	0	0	0	0	0	0											
10	10	0	0	0	0	0	0	0	0											
11	11	0	0	0	0	0	0	0	0											
12	12	0	0	0	0	0	0	0	0											
13	13	0	0	0	0	0	0	0	0	Qualification to relegation play-offs										
14	14	0	0	0	0	0	0	0	0	Qualification to relegation play-offs										
15	15	0	0	0	0	0	0	0	0	Relegated to Liga II										
16	16	0	0	0	0	0	0	0	0	Relegated to Liga II										

Source: LPF (in Romanian)
Legend: Blue = home team win; Yellow = draw; Red = away team win.
Rules for classification: 1) Points; 2) Points without rounding; 3) Points in the regular season; 4) Head-to-head points; 5) Head-to-head goal difference; 6) Head-to-head goals scored; 7) Goal difference; 8) Goals scored; 9) Play-off (only if needed to decide champion or teams for UEFA competitions). (Note: only criteria 7 and 8 are applied to establish the classification during the competition.

==== Results by round ====
Round	1
Ground	A
Result	D
Position	

A = Away; H = Home; W = Win; D = Draw; L = Loss

17 July 2026 1	Voluntari	2–2	Botoșani
18:30	Diarra 15' (o.g.); Merloi 88'		Dumiter 19'; Mitrov 47'
