= 2026–27 FC Corvinul Hunedoara season =

FC Corvinul Hunedoara
2026–27 season
- Manager: Florin Maxim
- Superliga: Pre-season
- Cupa României: Pre-season

The 2026–27 season is the 106th season in the history of FC Corvinul Hunedoara and their first season back in the Romanian top division since 1992. The club will also participate in the Cupa României.

== Transfers ==
=== In ===
Pos.	Player	Transferred from	Fee	Date	Source
DF	(Jordan) Mohammad Abualnadi	(Malaysia) Selangor	Free	1 July 2026	
FW	(Peru) Renato Espinosa	(Romania) Unirea Slobozia	Free	1 July 2026	
MF	(Slovakia) Andrej Fábry	(Romania) Universitatea Cluj	Free	1 July 2026	
MF	(Romania) Denis Hrezdac	(Romania) UTA Arad	Loan	1 July 2026	
FW	(Ghana) Emmanuel Yeboah	(Denmark) Brøndby IF	Free	7 July 2026	

=== Out ===
Pos.	Player	Transferred to	Fee	Date	Source
GK	(Romania) Codruț Sandu	(Romania) Dinamo București	Loan return	30 June 2026	
DF	(Hungary) Szabolcs Kilyén	(Romania) Bihor Oradea	Free	1 July 2026	

== Pre-season and friendlies ==
24 June 2026 Friendly	NK Brinje Grosuplje (Slovenia)	1–0	(Romania) Corvinul Hunedoara
18:30	Jovićević 33'

28 June 2026 Friendly	Corvinul Hunedoara (Romania)	v	(Hungary) FC Nagykanizsa
17:00

1 July 2026 Friendly	Corvinul Hunedoara (Romania)	2–0	(Armenia) Pyunik
11:00	Fábry 30'; Hrezdac 82'

2 July 2026 Friendly	Koper (Slovenia)	1–0	(Romania) Corvinul Hunedoara
18:00	Ruedl 75'

== Competitions ==
=== Superliga ===
Pos	Team	Pld	W	D	L	GF	GA	GD	Pts	Qualification
1	Universitatea Craiova	1	1	0	0	4	0	+4	3	Advances to Play-off
2	Corvinul Hunedoara	1	1	0	0	3	0	+3	3	Advances to Play-off
3	FCSB	1	1	0	0	2	0	+2	3	Advances to Play-off
4	Universitatea Cluj	1	1	0	0	2	1	+1	3	Advances to Play-off
5	Oțelul Galați	1	1	0	0	2	1	+1	3	Advances to Play-off

Updated to match(es) played on 20 July, 2026. Source: LPF (in Romanian)
Rules for classification: 1) Points; 2) Head-to-head points; 3) Head-to-head goal difference; 4) Head-to-head goals scored; 5) Goal difference; 6) Goals scored; 7) Play-off.

==== Results by round ====
Round	1	2	3	4	5	6	7	8	9	10	11	12	13	14	15	16	17	18	19	20	21	22	23	24	25	26	27	28	29	30
Ground	H	A	H	A	H	A	H	A	H	A	H	A	H	H	A	A	H	A	H	A	H	A	H	A	H	A	H	A	A	H
Result	W																													
Position	2																													

Updated to match(es) played on 20 July 2026. Source:
A = Away; H = Home; W = Win; D = Draw; L = Loss

=== Matches ===
20 July 2026 1	Corvinul Hunedoara	3–0	Csíkszereda Miercurea Ciuc	Arad
18:30 EEST (UTC+3)	Fábry 57' (pen.)Pîrvulescu 62'Sérgio Ribeiro 65'	Report		Stadium: Francisc von Neuman; Attendance: 2,598; Referee: Marcel Bîrsan

25 July 2026 2	Farul Constanța	v	Corvinul Hunedoara	Ovidiu
18:30 EEST (UTC+3)				Stadium: Central

3 August 2026 3	Corvinul Hunedoara	v	Sepsi OSK	Arad
18:30 EEST (UTC+3)				Stadium: Francisc von Neuman
