= List of Romanian expatriate footballers =

This is a list of Romanian football players that have played abroad in professional leagues other than the Romanian League.

== Cambodia ==
=== Cambodian Premier League ===
- Raul Feher (Phnom Penh Crown)

== China ==
=== Chinese Super League ===
- Andrei Burcă (Yunnan Yukun)
- Alexandru Cîmpanu (Chongqing Tonglianglong)
- Alexandru Ioniță (Yunnan Yukun)
- Alexandru Mitriță (Zhejiang FC)
- Nicolae Stanciu (Dalian Yingbo)

== Iraq ==
=== Iraq Stars League ===
- Hussein Shehait (Al-Karma)

== Jordan ==
=== Jordanian Pro League ===
- Ahmed Bani (Al-Hussein)

== Qatar ==
=== Qatar Stars League ===
- Florinel Coman (Al-Gharafa)

== United Arab Emirates ==
=== UAE Pro League ===
- Costin Amzăr (Al-Nasr)

== Canada ==
=== Canadian Premier League ===
- Erik Pop (Valour FC)

== United States ==
=== Major League Soccer ===
- Alexandru Băluță (Los Angeles FC)
- Ștefan Chirilă (FC Cincinnati)
- Enes Sali (FC Dallas)

=== MLS Next Pro ===
- Vlad Dǎnciuțiu (Austin FC II)

== Andorra ==
=== Primera Divisió ===
- Kevin Olah (Atlètic Club d'Escaldes)

== Austria ==
=== Bundesliga ===
- Darius Achitei (Grazer AK)

=== 2. Liga ===
- Jose-Andrei Rostas (SV Kapfenberg)

=== Regionalliga ===
- Sebastian Bacu (TWL Elektra)
- Luca Botas (Dietach)
- Sacha Marinkovic (Kufstein)
- Alin Mutu (Lustenau)
- Kevin Popovici (Dietach)

== Azerbaijan ==
=== Azerbaijan Premier League ===
- Cristian Costin (Neftçi)
- Andrei Tîrcoveanu (Şamaxı FK)

== Belgium ==
=== Challenger Pro League ===
- Luca Florică (Olympic Charleroi)
- Robert Ion (Olympic Charleroi)

== Bosnia and Herzegovina ==
=== Premier League of Bosnia and Herzegovina ===
- Grigore Turda (FK Sarajevo)

== Cyprus ==
=== Cypriot First Division ===
- Marius Corbu (APOEL)
- Vlad Dragomir (Pafos FC)
- Mihail Marinescu (Ethnikos)

=== Cypriot Second Division ===
- Eduard Lambrinoc (PAEEK)
- Alexandru Martinas (Iraklis Gerolakkou)
- Gabriel Pipi (Chalkanoras Idaliou)
- Gabriel Toader (Karmiotissa)

== Czech Republic ==
=== Czech First League ===
- Andres Dumitrescu (Sigma Olomouc)

== Denmark ==
=== Superligaen ===
- Alexi Pitu (Vejle BK)

== England ==
=== Premier League ===
- Radu Drăgușin (Tottenham)

== Faroe Islands ==
=== 2. deild ===
- Radu Ovidiu (B68 Toftir II)

== Georgia ==
=== Erovnuli Liga ===
- David Vraciu (Kolkheti)

== Germany ==
=== 2. Bundesliga ===
- Virgil Ghiță (Hannover 96)
- Raul Marița (Greuther Fürth)

=== Regionalliga ===
- Luca Andronache (SGV Freiberg)
- Emanuel Marincău (Mainz 05 II)
- Leon Petö (SGV Freiberg)

== Greece ==
=== Super League Greece ===
- Andrei Ivan (Panserraikos)
- Răzvan Marin (AEK Athens)
- Alexandru Mățan (Panetolikos)
- Sebastian Mladen (Panetolikos)
- Olimpiu Moruțan (Aris)

== Hungary ==
=== Nemzeti Bajnokság I ===
- Paul Anton (Győri ETO FC)
- Deian Boldor (Győri ETO FC)
- Claudiu Bumba (Győri ETO FC)
- George Ganea (Újpest FC)
- Ștefan Vlădoiu (Győri ETO FC)

=== Nemzeti Bajnokság II ===
- Csongor Berkeczi (Karcagi SE)
- Roland Gergely (Karcagi SE)
- Áron Girsik (Karcagi SE)
- Krisztián Székely (Budapesti VSC)
- Alexandru Ureche (Budapesti VSC)

== Israel ==
=== Israeli Premier League ===
- Lisav Naif Eissat (Maccabi Haifa)
- Antonio Sefer (Maccabi Bnei Reineh)

== Italy ==
=== Serie A ===
- Marius Marin (Pisa)
- Mihai Popa (Torino)
- Răzvan Sava (Udinese)

=== Serie B ===
- Rareș Burnete (Juve Stabia)
- Andrei Coubiș (Sampdoria)
- Rareș Ilie (Empoli)

=== Serie C ===
- Andrei Anton (Pro Vercelli)
- Gabriele Boloca (AlbinoLeffe)
- Alexandru Borbei (Foggia)
- Alexandru Capac (Atalanta U23)
- Antonio David (Inter U23)
- Eduard Duțu (Latina)
- Mihai Gușu (AlbinoLeffe)
- Denis Hergheligiu (Latina)
- Robert Toma (Guidonia)

=== Serie D ===
- Edoardo Alloj (Gravina)
- Gabriele Bârlădeanu (Real Monterotondo)
- Orlando Bita (Lentigione)
- Remus Bobocea (Budoni)
- Gabriel Bugli (Varese)
- Francesco Domnițeiu (Milan Futuro)
- Gabriel Donos (Sarnese)
- Robert Drăgoi (Imolese)
- Vlad Duminică (Luparense)
- Matteo Duțu (Milan Futuro)
- Andrei Florescu (San Marino)
- Marian Găldean (Pompei)
- Darian Hrom (Oltrepò)
- Alexandru Iacob (Camaiore)
- Andrei Lungu (Saluzzo)
- Alessio Marcu (Grosseto)
- Robert Matei (Virtus Francavilla)
- Tommaso Nistor (NovaRomentin)
- Bogdan Stăuciuc (Fasano)
- Alexandru Șiman (Milan Futuro)
- Andrei Tanasa (Gravina)
- Mădălin Țandără (Vigor Lamezia)

== Kazakhstan ==
=== Kazakhstan Premier League ===
- Mihai Căpățînă (Ordabasy)
- Bogdan Vătăjelu (Aktobe)
- Andrei Vlad (Aktobe)

== Kosovo ==
=== Superleague of Kosovo ===
- Carlo Casap (KF Prishtina e Re)

== Lithuania ==
=== A Lyga ===
- Liviu Antal (Žalgiris)
- Patrick Popescu (Hegelmann)
- Árpád Tordai (Žalgiris)

== Luxembourg ==
=== National Division ===
- Răzvan Bumbar (Rodange 91)
- Tudor Neamțiu (Dudelange)

=== Division of Honour ===
- Raul Andrei Toma (FC Wiltz 71)

== Malta ==
=== Maltese Premier League ===
- Laurențiu Brănescu (Hibernians FC)
- Andrei Ciolacu (Valletta)

=== Maltese Challenge League ===
- Mattia Galliano (St. Andrews)

== Netherlands ==
=== Eredivisie ===
- Dennis Man (PSV)

== Russia ==
=== Russian Premier League ===
- Ionuț Nedelcearu (Akron Togliatti)

== Scotland ==
=== Scottish Championship ===
- Marco Rus (Ayr United)

== Serbia ==
=== Serbian SuperLiga ===
- Mihai Butean (Vojvodina)

== Slovakia ==
=== Slovak First Football League ===
- Andrei Florea (MSK Zilina)
- Nándor Tamás (Komárno)

== Spain ==
=== La Liga ===
- Horațiu Moldovan (Real Oviedo)
- Ionuț Radu (Celta Vigo)
- Andrei Rațiu (Rayo Vallecano)

=== Primera Federación ===
- Robert Jălade (Sevilla Atlético)
- Vlad Rafailă (Betis Deportivo)
- Ianis Târbă (Celta Fortuna)

=== Segunda Federación ===
- Florin Andone (Atlético Baleares)
- Darius Fustos (Deportivo Aragón)
- Andrei Lupu (UD Logroñés)
- Rareș Mezdrea (Coruxo FC)
- Alin Șerban (Real Valladolid Promesas)

== Switzerland ==
=== 1. Liga Classic ===
- Andrei Herlea (FC Tuggen)

== Turkey ==
=== Süper Lig ===
- Ümit Akdağ (Alanyaspor)
- Denis Drăguș (Eyüpspor)
- Ianis Hagi (Alanyaspor)
- Alexandru Maxim (Gaziantep F.K.)
- Valentin Mihăilă (Çaykur Rizespor)
- Deian Sorescu (Gaziantep F.K.)
- Marius Ștefănescu (Konyaspor)

=== TFF 1. Lig ===
- Dorin Rotariu (Iğdır F.K.)

== Ukraine ==
=== Ukrainian Premier League ===
- Vladislav Blănuță (Dynamo Kyiv)

== Wales ==
=== Cymru North ===
- Andrei Nazaru (Newtown)
