= Bogdan Ungureanu =

Romanian footballer

Personal information
- Full name: George Bogdan Ungureanu
- Date of birth: 1 April 2007 (age 19)
- Place of birth: Bucharest, Romania
- Height: 1.88 m (6 ft 2 in)
- Position: Goalkeeper

Team information
- Current team: Rapid București/CSL Ștefănești
- Number: 99/

Youth career
- –2022: Rapid București

Senior career*
| Years | Team | Apps | (Gls) |
| 2022– | Rapid București | 11 | (0) |
| 2025 | → Corvinul Hunedoara (loan) | 7 | (0) |
| 2025–2026 | → Sepsi OSK (loan) | 30 | (0) |
| 2026– | CSL Ștefănești | 0 | (0) |

International career^{‡}
| 2022 | Romania U15 | 2 | (0) |
| 2022–2023 | Romania U16 | 12 | (0) |
| 2022–2024 | Romania U17 | 14 | (0) |
| 2024–2025 | Romania U18 | 6 | (0) |
| 2025– | Romania U19 | 7 | (0) |
- * Club domestic league appearances and goals as of 24 October 2026 ‡ National team caps and goals as of 28 March 2026

George Bogdan Ungureanu (born 1 April 2007) is a Romanian professional footballer who plays as a goalkeeper for Liga I club Rapid București and for Liga II club CSL Ștefănești.

== Club career ==
=== Rapid București ===
He made his debut on 27 May 2023 for Rapid București in Liga I match against FCSB. He debuted at 16 years, 1 months and 25 days, at that time being the youngest debutant for Rapid Bucureşti in Liga I.

==== Loan to Corvinul Hunedoara ====
On 1 January 2025, Ungureanu was loaned to Corvinul Hunedoara.

==== Loan to Sepsi OSK ====
On 16 July 2025, Ungureanu was loaned to Sepsi OSK for one season.

== Career statistics ==
As of match played 24 October 2026

Appearances and goals by club, season and competition
| Club | Season | League | | | Cupa României | | Europe | | Other | | Total | |
| Club | Season | Division | Apps | Goals | Apps | Goals | Apps | Goals | Apps | Goals | Apps | Goals |
|---|---|---|---|---|---|---|---|---|---|---|---|---|
| Rapid București | 2022–23 | Liga I | 1 | 0 | 0 | 0 | — | | — | | 1 | 0 |
| Rapid București | 2023–24 | Liga I | 4 | 0 | 0 | 0 | — | | — | | 4 | 0 |
| Rapid București | 2024–25 | Liga I | 0 | 0 | 1 | 0 | — | | — | | 1 | 0 |
| Rapid București | 2026–27 | Liga I | 6 | 0 | 1 | 0 | — | | — | | 7 | 0 |
| Rapid București | Total | | 11 | 0 | 2 | 0 | — | | — | | 13 | 0 |
| Corvinul Hunedoara (loan) | 2024–25 | Liga II | 7 | 0 | — | | — | | — | | 7 | 0 |
| Sepsi OSK (loan) | 2025–26 | Liga II | 30 | 0 | 4 | 0 | — | | — | | 34 | 0 |
| CSL Ștefănești | 2026–27 | Liga II | 0 | 0 | — | | — | | — | | 0 | 0 |
| Career total | | | 48 | 0 | 6 | 0 | — | | — | | 54 | 0 |
