= Jelani Trevisan =

Belgian footballer (born 2005)

Personal information
- Full name: Jelani Dumas Diantantu Trevisan
- Date of birth: 22 March 2005 (age 21)
- Place of birth: Brussels, Belgium
- Height: 1.82 m (6 ft 0 in)
- Position: Forward

Team information
- Current team: CFR Cluj
- Number: 99

Youth career
- 2011–2013: RWS Bruxelles
- 2013–2015: Mechelen
- 2015–2020: Standard Liège
- 2020–2021: Gent
- 2021–2024: Benfica

Senior career*
Years	Team	Apps	(Gls)
2024–2025	Benfica U23	21	(6)
2025–2026	Benfica B	27	(7)
2026–	CFR Cluj	1	(0)

International career
2021	Belgium U17	1	(0)
- * Club domestic league appearances and goals as of 18 October 2026

Jelani Dumas Diantantu Trevisan (born 22 March 2005) is a Belgian professional footballer who plays as a forward for Liga I club CFR Cluj.

== Career statistics ==
=== Club ===
As of match played 28 October 2026

Club	Season	League			National Cup (Note: Includes Taça Revelação, Cupa României)		Continental		Other		Total	
Club	Season	Division	Apps	Goals	Apps	Goals	Apps	Goals	Apps	Goals	Apps	Goals
Benfica U23	2023–24	Liga Revelação	4	0	–		–		–		4	0
Benfica U23	2024–25	Liga Revelação	15	5	5	2	–		–		20	7
Benfica U23	2025–26	Liga Revelação	2	1	–		–		–		2	1
Benfica U23	Total		21	6	5	2	–		–		26	8
Benfica B	2025–26	Liga Portugal 2	27	7	–		–		–		27	7
Benfica B	2026–27	Liga Portugal 2	0	0	–		–		–		0	0
Benfica B	Total		27	7	–		–		–		27	7
CFR Cluj	2026–27	Liga I	1	0	1	0	–		–		2	0
Career total			49	13	6	2	–		–		55	15
