= Alexandru Maxim (footballer, born 2007) =

Romanian footballer (born 2007)

Personal information
- Full name: Alexandru Gabriel Maxim
- Date of birth: 23 January 2007 (age 19)
- Place of birth: Craiova, Romania
- Height: 2.02 m (6 ft 8 in)
- Position: Goalkeeper

Team information
- Current team: Universitatea Craiova/CSM Slatina
- Number: 1/

Youth career
- –2021: CSȘ Craiova
- 2021–2024: FCSB

Senior career*
Years	Team	Apps	(Gls)
2024–2026	FCSB	0	(0)
2024	→ Voluntari (loan)	6	(0)
2025	→ CSM Olimpia Satu Mare (loan)	12	(0)
2025–2026	→ Voluntari (loan)	24	(0)
2026–	Universitatea Craiova	0	(0)
2026–	CSM Slatina	0	(0)

International career^{‡}
2022	Romania U15	2	(0)
2022–2023	Romania U16	7	(0)
2023	Romania U17	2	(0)
2024	Romania U18	2	(0)
2025–	Romania U19	1	(0)
- * Club domestic league appearances and goals as of 6 May 2026 ‡ National team caps and goals as of 7 September 2025

Alexandru Gabriel Maxim (born 25 September 2007) is a Romanian professional footballer who plays as a goalkeeper for Liga I club Universitatea Craiova and for Liga II club CSM Slatina.

== Career statistics ==
As of 6 May 2026

Appearances and goals by club, season and competition
Club	Season	League			Cupa României		Europe		Other		Total	
Club	Season	Division	Apps	Goals	Apps	Goals	Apps	Goals	Apps	Goals	Apps	Goals
Voluntari (loan)	2024–25	Liga II	6	0	1	0	—		—		7	0
CSM Olimpia Satu Mare (loan)	2024–25	Liga III	12	0	—		—		4 (Note: Appearances in Liga III promotion play-offs)	0	16	0
Voluntari (loan)	2025–26	Liga II	24	0	0	0	—		0	0	24	0
Universitatea Craiova	2026–27	Liga I	0	0	0	0	0	0	0	0	0	0
CSM Slatina	2026–27	Liga II	0	0	—		—		—		0	0
Career total			42	0	1	0	0	0	4	0	47	0

== Honours ==
Universitatea Craiova

- Supercupa României: 2026
