= Robert Bădescu =

Romanian footballer (born 2005)

Personal information
- Full name: Robert Gabriel Bădescu
- Date of birth: 2 April 2005 (age 21)
- Place of birth: Bucharest, Romania
- Height: 1.86 m (6 ft 1 in)
- Position: Defender

Team information
- Current team: UTA Arad
- Number: 22

Youth career
- 2015–2022: Academia Pro Sport
- 2022–2024: Rapid București

Senior career*
Years	Team	Apps	(Gls)
2024–2026	Rapid București	12	(1)
2024	→ Mioveni (loan)	5	(0)
2026	→ Metaloglobus București (loan)	10	(1)
2026–	UTA Arad	6	(0)

International career^{‡}
2021–2022	Romania U17	9	(0)
2022–2023	Romania U18	8	(1)
2023–2024	Romania U19	7	(0)
2024–2025	Romania U20	4	(0)
- * Club domestic league appearances and goals as of 1 November 2026 ‡ National team caps and goals as of 13 October 2025

Robert Gabriel Bădescu (born 2 April 2005) is a Romanian professional footballer who plays as a defender for Liga I club UTA Arad.

== Club career ==
In September 2022, Bădescu joined the youth setup of Liga I team Rapid București from Academia Pro Sport. There, he was remarked by academy coach Geraldo Alves, who praised him for his physical qualities.

Following the temporary exclusion of regular starter Andrei Borza, Bădescu made his senior debut and scored in a 4–1 home Liga I win over UTA Arad on 28 February 2024.

== Career statistics ==
As of match played 1 November 2026

Appearances and goals by club, season and competition
Club	Season	League			Cupa României		Europe		Other		Total	
Club	Season	Division	Apps	Goals	Apps	Goals	Apps	Goals	Apps	Goals	Apps	Goals
Rapid București	2023–24	Liga I	5	1	—		—		—		5	1
Rapid București	2024–25	Liga I	1	0	0	0	—		—		1	0
Rapid București	2025–26	Liga I	6	0	1	0	—		—		7	0
Rapid București	Total		12	1	1	0	—		—		13	1
Mioveni (loan)	2024–25	Liga II	5	0	1	0	—		—		6	0
Metaloglobus București (loan)	2025–26	Liga I	10	1	0	0	—		—		10	1
UTA Arad	2026–27	Liga I	6	0	0	0	—		—		6	0
Career total			33	2	2	0	—		—		35	2
