= Adrian Frănculescu =

Romanian footballer (born 2005)

Personal information
- Full name: Costel Adrian Frănculescu
- Date of birth: 28 February 2005 (age 21)
- Place of birth: Drobeta-Turnu Severin, Romania
- Height: 1.85 m (6 ft 1 in)
- Position: Goalkeeper

Team information
- Current team: Corvinul Hunedoara (on loan from CFR Cluj)
- Number: 12

Youth career
- –2019: Luceafărul Drobeta Turnu Severin
- 2019–2021: FCSB
- 2021–2023: CFR Cluj

Senior career*
Years	Team	Apps	(Gls)
2023–	CFR Cluj	0	(0)
2023–2026	→ CSA Steaua București (loan)	76	(0)
2026–	→ Corvinul Hunedoara (loan)	2	(0)

International career^{‡}
2022	Romania U17	1	(0)
2023–2024	Romania U19	6	(0)
- * Club domestic league appearances and goals as of 7 November 2026 ‡ National team caps and goals as of 20 September 2026

Costel Adrian Frănculescu (born 28 February 2005) is a Romanian professional footballer who plays as a goalkeeper for Liga I club Corvinul Hunedoara, on loan from CFR Cluj.

== Career statistics ==
As of 7 November 2026

Appearances and goals by club, season and competition
Club	Season	League			Cupa României		Europe		Other		Total	
Club	Season	Division	Apps	Goals	Apps	Goals	Apps	Goals	Apps	Goals	Apps	Goals
CSA Steaua București (loan)	2023–24	Liga II	22	0	1	0	—		—		23	0
CSA Steaua București (loan)	2024–25	Liga II	23	0	0	0	—		—		23	0
CSA Steaua București (loan)	2025–26	Liga II	31	0	1	0	—		—		32	0
CSA Steaua București (loan)	Total		76	0	2	0	—		—		78	0
Corvinul Hunedoara (loan)	2026–27	Liga I	2	0	3	0	—		—		5	0
Career total			78	0	5	0	—		—		83	0
