= Alin Techereș =

Romanian footballer (born 2007)

Personal information
- Full name: Ionel Alin Techereș
- Date of birth: 5 January 2007 (age 19)
- Place of birth: Câmpia Turzii, Romania
- Height: 1.80 m (5 ft 11 in)
- Position: Left-back

Team information
- Current team: Universitatea Cluj/Politehnica Timișoara
- Number: 59/

Youth career
- 2013–2016: Industria Sârmei Câmpia Turzii
- 2016–2025: Universitatea Cluj

Senior career*
Years	Team	Apps	(Gls)
2025–	Universitatea Cluj	1	(0)
2025	→ Unirea Ungheni (loan)	10	(0)
2025–2026	→ Sepsi OSK (loan)	28	(1)
2026–	Politehnica Timișoara	0	(0)

International career^{‡}
2022	Romania U15	6	(0)
2022–2023	Romania U17	12	(0)
2022–2024	Romania U17	12	(0)
2024–2025	Romania U18	7	(1)
2024–	Romania U19	10	(0)
- * Club domestic league appearances and goals as of 26 July 2026 ‡ National team caps and goals as of 26 June 2026

Ionel Alin Techereș (born 5 January 2007) is a Romanian professional footballer who plays as a left-back for Liga I club Universitatea Cluj and for Liga II club Politehnica Timișoara.

== Career statistics ==
As of 26 July 2026

Appearances and goals by club, season and competition
Club	Season	League			Cupa României		Europe		Other		Total	
Club	Season	Division	Apps	Goals	Apps	Goals	Apps	Goals	Apps	Goals	Apps	Goals
Unirea Ungheni (loan)	2024–25	Liga II	10	0	—		—		—		10	0
Sepsi OSK (loan)	2025–26	Liga II	28	1	4	0	—		—		32	1
Universitatea Cluj	2026–27	Liga I	1	0	0	0	0	0	0	0	1	0
Politehnica Timișoara	2026–27	Liga II	0	0	—		—		—		0	0
Career total			39	1	4	0	0	0	0	0	43	1

== Honours ==
Universitatea Cluj

- Supercupa României runner-up: 2026
