= Mario Ioniță =

Romanian footballer

Personal information
- Full name: Mario Alexandru Ioniță
- Date of birth: 17 March 2007 (age 19)
- Place of birth: Ploiești, Romania
- Height: 1.70 m (5 ft 7 in)
- Position: Central midfielder

Team information
- Current team: Petrolul Ploiești
- Number: 80

Youth career
- –2023: Petrolul Ploiești

Senior career*
Years	Team	Apps	(Gls)
2022–	Petrolul Ploiești	12	(2)
2023–2024	→ Cetatea Turnu Măgurele (loan)	27	(0)
2024	→ Unirea Ungheni (loan)	7	(0)
2025	→ CSA Steaua București (loan)	3	(0)
2025–2026	→ Afumați (loan)	23	(4)

International career
2022	Romania U15	3	(1)
- * Club domestic league appearances and goals as of 6 November 2026

Mario Alexandru Ioniță (born 17 March 2007) is a Romanian professional footballer who plays as a central midfielder for Liga I club Petrolul Ploiești.

== Career statistics ==
As of 6 November 2026

Appearances and goals by club, season and competition
Club	Season	League			Cupa României		Europe		Other		Total	
Club	Season	Division	Apps	Goals	Apps	Goals	Apps	Goals	Apps	Goals	Apps	Goals
Petrolul Ploiești	2021–22	Liga II	1	0	—		—		—		1	0
Petrolul Ploiești	2022–23	Liga I	1	0	0	0	—		—		1	0
Petrolul Ploiești	2025–26	Liga I	10	2	3	0	—		—		13	2
Petrolul Ploiești	Total		12	2	3	0	—		—		15	2
Cetatea Turnu Măgurele (loan)	2023–24	Liga III	27	0	0	0	—		—		27	0
Unirea Ungheni (loan)	2024–5	Liga II	7	0	3	0	—		—		10	0
CSA Steaua București (loan)	2025–26	Liga II	3	0	0	0	—		—		3	0
Afumați (loan)	2025–26	Liga II	23	4	—		—		—		23	4
Career total			72	6	6	0	—		—		78	6

== Honours ==
Petrolul Ploiești

- Liga II: 2021–22
