= Daniel Dumbrăvanu =

Moldovan footballer

Personal information
- Date of birth: 22 July 2001 (age 25)
- Place of birth: Bălți, Moldova
- Height: 1.92 m (6 ft 4 in)
- Position: Centre-back

Team information
- Current team: Voluntari
- Number: 4

Youth career
- –2018: Zaria Bălți
- 2018–2021: Genoa
- 2020: → Pescara (loan)

Senior career*
Years	Team	Apps	(Gls)
2018	Zaria Bălți	2	(0)
2021–2022	Genoa	0	(0)
2021–2022	→ Lucchese (loan)	4	(0)
2022	→ Siena (loan)	12	(0)
2022–2024	SPAL	0	(0)
2022–2023	→ APOEL (loan)	0	(0)
2024	→ Messina (loan)	14	(0)
2024–2025	Lucchese	6	(0)
2025	→ Messina (loan)	11	(0)
2025–2026	CFR Cluj	2	(1)
2025–2026	→ Voluntari (loan)	19	(0)
2026–	Voluntari	13	(0)

International career^{‡}
2017	Moldova U16	1	(0)
2016–2018	Moldova U17	9	(0)
2017	Moldova U18	3	(0)
2021	Moldova U21	4	(0)
2021–	Moldova	14	(0)
- * Club domestic league appearances and goals as of 2 November 2026 ‡ National team caps and goals as of 6 October 2026

Daniel Dumbrăvanu (born 22 July 2001) is a Moldovan professional footballer who plays as a centre-back for Liga I club Voluntari and the Moldova national team.

== Club career ==
Dumbrăvanu made two appearances for Zaria Bălți in the 2018 Moldovan National Division.

In 2018 Dumbrăvanu became a Genoa player. In January 2020 he went to Pescara on loan.

He never played a match for Pescara and at the end of the loan he came back to Genoa. He made his debut with the Rossoblù on 13 January 2021 in a Coppa Italia game away against Juventus.

On 14 August 2021, he joined Lucchese in Serie C on loan. He played four games for Lucchese. On 29 January 2022, he moved on loan to Siena.

On 12 July 2022, Dumbrăvanu joined SPAL on a permanent deal until 30 June 2025. He was immediately loaned out to Cypriot club APOEL. Having not found any game time in Cyprus, on 31 January 2023 the defender was re-called by SPAL. On 31 January 2024, Dumbrăvanu was loaned to Messina.

Dumbrăvanu joined Lucchese permanently in August 2024 on a two-year contract.

== International career ==
He made his debut for Moldova national football team on 31 March 2021 in a World Cup qualifier against Israel.

== Career statistics ==
=== Club ===
As of match played 2 November 2026

Club	Season	League			National cup (Note: Includes Coppa Italia Serie C, Coppa Italia, Cupa României)		Europe		Other		Total	
Club	Season	Division	Apps	Goals	Apps	Goals	Apps	Goals	Apps	Goals	Apps	Goals
Zaria Bălți	2018	Divizia Națională	2	0	0	0	2 (Note: Appearances in UEFA Europa League)	0	–		4	0
Genoa	2020–21	Serie A	0	0	1	0	–		–		1	0
Lucchese (loan)	2021–22	Serie C	4	0	0	0	–		–		4	0
Siena (loan)	2021–22	Serie C	12	0	–		–		–		12	0
APOEL (loan)	2022–23	Cypriot First Division	0	0	0	0	0	0	–		0	0
SPAL	2022–23	Serie B	0	0	–		–		–		0	0
SPAL	2023–24	Serie C	0	0	1	0	–		–		1	0
SPAL	2024–25	Serie C	0	0	0	0	–		–		0	0
SPAL	Total		0	0	1	0	–		–		1	0
Lucchese	2024–25	Serie C	6	0	–		–		–		6	0
Messina (loan)	2024–25	Serie C	11	0	–		–		2 (Note: Appearances in Serie C relegation play-offs)	0	13	0
CFR Cluj	2025–26	Liga I	2	1	–		0	0	0	0	2	1
Voluntari (loan)	2025–26	Liga II	19	0	–		–		0	0	19	0
Voluntari	2026–27	Liga I	13	0	2	0	–		–		15	0
Voluntari	Total		32	0	2	0	–		0	0	34	0
Career total			68	1	4	0	2	0	2	0	77	1

=== International ===
As of match played 6 October 2026

Appearances and goals by national team and year
National team	Year	Apps	Goals
Moldova	2021	2	0
Moldova	2022	3	0
Moldova	2025	5	0
Moldova	2026	4	0
Total		14	0

== Honours ==
CFR Cluj

- Supercupa României runner-up: 2025
