= Mark Țuțu =

Romanian footballer

Personal information
- Date of birth: 2 January 2004 (age 22)
- Place of birth: Iași, Romania
- Height: 1.72 m (5 ft 8 in)
- Position: Right back

Team information
- Current team: Petrolul Ploiești
- Number: 22

Youth career
- 2014–2017: CF Montréal
- 2022–2024: Varzim

Senior career*
Years	Team	Apps	(Gls)
2024–2026	Ceahlăul Piatra Neamț	25	(0)
2025–2026	→ UTA Arad (loan)	33	(0)
2026–	Petrolul Ploiești	14	(1)

International career^{‡}
2024–2025	Romania U20	2	(0)
2025–2026	Romania U21	3	(0)
- * Club domestic league appearances and goals as of 6 November 2026 ‡ National team caps and goals as of 31 March 2026

Mark Țuțu (born 2 January 2004) is a Romanian professional footballer who plays as a right back for Liga I club Petrolul Ploiești.

== Career statistics ==
As of 6 November 2026

Appearances and goals by club, season and competition
Club	Season	League			Cupa României		Europe		Other		Total	
Club	Season	Division	Apps	Goals	Apps	Goals	Apps	Goals	Apps	Goals	Apps	Goals
Ceahlăul Piatra Neamț	2024–25	Liga II	25	0	3	0	—		—		28	0
UTA Arad (loan)	2025–26	Liga I	33	0	2	0	—		—		35	0
Petrolul Ploiești	2026–27	Liga I	14	1	3	0	—		—		17	1
Career total			72	1	8	0	—		—		80	1
