= Ștefan Senciuc =

Romanian professional footballer (born 2007)

Personal information
- Full name: Ștefan Eduard Senciuc
- Date of birth: 2 April 2007 (age 19)
- Place of birth: San Donà di Piave, Italy
- Height: 1.78 m (5 ft 10 in)
- Position: Right-back

Team information
- Current team: Rapid București/CSL Ștefănești
- Number: 17/19

Youth career
- –2025: Venezia

Senior career*
Years	Team	Apps	(Gls)
2025–2026	CFR Cluj	0	(0)
2025–2026	→ ASA Târgu Mureș (loan)	25	(0)
2026–	Rapid București	0	(0)
2026–	CSL Ștefănești	4	(0)

International career^{‡}
2024–2025	Romania U18	10	(0)
2025–	Romania U19	6	(1)
2025–	Romania U20	1	(0)
- * Club domestic league appearances and goals as of 12 September 2026 ‡ National team caps and goals as of 31 March 2026

Ștefan Eduard Senciuc (born 2 April 2007) is a Romanian professional footballer who plays as a right-back for Liga I club Rapid București and for Liga II club CSL Ștefănești.

== Early life ==
Senciuc was born in San Donà di Piave, Italy, to Romanian parents originating from Suceava. He holds dual Romanian and Italian citizenship. He was raised in Italy, joining the youth academy of Venezia, where he progressed through the youth ranks up to the Primavera team.

== Club career ==
=== CFR Cluj and loan to ASA Târgu Mureș ===
In July 2025, Senciuc moved to Romania, signing a four-year contract with Liga I club CFR Cluj. On 8 August 2025, to gain senior first-team experience, he was loaned to Liga II side ASA Târgu Mureș for the 2025–26 season. He established himself as a regular starter for the Liga II club, making 25 league appearances throughout the campaign.

=== Rapid București ===
On 8 July 2026, Senciuc completed a permanent transfer to Rapid București, signing a four-year contract valid through June 2030. He joined the squad coached by Daniel Pancu at their pre-season training camp in Austria.

== International career ==
Despite being eligible for Italy, Senciuc chose to represent Romania internationally. He made ten appearances for the Romania under-18 national team between 2024 and 2025.

On 12 November 2025, Senciuc scored his first international goal for the Romania U19 team in a 4–1 victory over Andorra during the 2026 UEFA European Under-19 Championship qualification. He also featured for the Romania under-20 national team in the Under-20 Elite League.

== Career statistics ==
As of 12 September 2026

Appearances and goals by club, season and competition
Club	Season	League			National Cup		Europe		Other		Total	
Club	Season	Division	Apps	Goals	Apps	Goals	Apps	Goals	Apps	Goals	Apps	Goals
ASA Târgu Mureș (loan)	2025–26	Liga II	25	0	—		—		—		25	0
Rapid București	2026–27	Liga I	0	0	0	0	—		—		0	0
CSL Ștefănești	2026–27	Liga II	4	0	—		—		—		4	0
Career total			29	0	0	0	—		—		29	0
