= Márcio Rosa =

Cape Verdean footballer (born 1997)

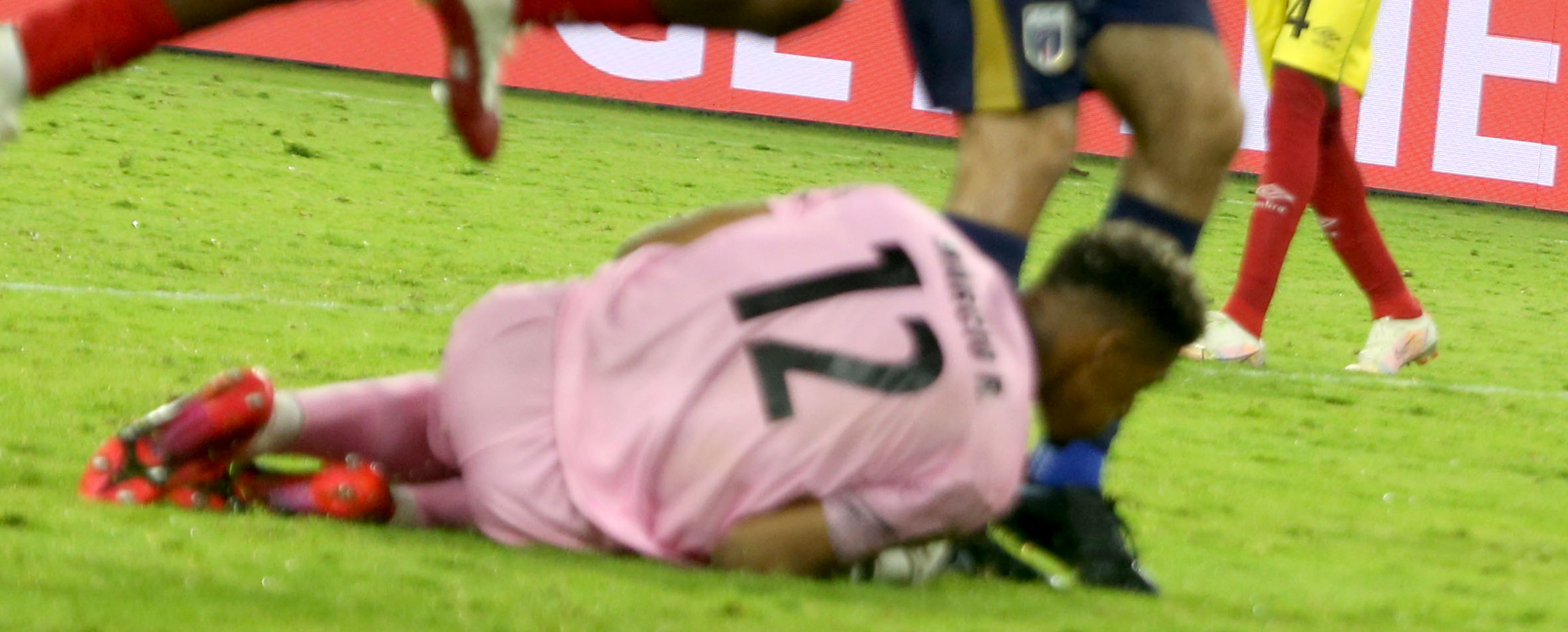
- Rosa in 2022

Personal information
- Full name: Márcio Salomão Brazão da Rosa
- Date of birth: 23 February 1997 (age 29)
- Place of birth: Praia, Cape Verde
- Height: 1.87 m (6 ft 2 in)
- Position: Goalkeeper

Team information
- Current team: UTA Arad
- Number: 1

Youth career
- 2005–2013: EPIF
- 2013–2014: Kumunidade
- 2014–2015: Real SC
- 2015–2016: Chaves

Senior career*
Years	Team	Apps	(Gls)
2016–2018	Chaves	0	(0)
2017–2018	Chaves B	0	(0)
2016–2017	→ Montalegre (loan)	25	(0)
2018	Montalegre	3	(0)
2018–2021	Cova da Piedade	1	(0)
2021–2022	Montalegre	16	(0)
2022–2023	Real SC	0	(0)
2023	Vilafranquense	0	(0)
2023–2024	Anadia	12	(0)
2024–2025	Hebar Pazardzhik	20	(0)
2025–2026	Montana	19	(0)
2026–	UTA Arad	9	(0)

International career^{‡}
2019	Cape Verde U20	1	(0)
2018–	Cape Verde	11	(0)
- * Club domestic league appearances and goals as of 6 November 2026 ‡ National team caps and goals as of 6 June 2026

Márcio Salomão Brazão da Rosa (Portuguese: [ˈmaɾ.si.u sɐ.lu.ˈmɐ̃w bɾɐ.ˈzɐ̃w dɐ ˈʀɔ.zɐ]; born 23 February 1997) is a Cape Verdean professional footballer who plays as a goalkeeper for Liga I club UTA Arad and the Cape Verde national team.

== Professional career ==
Rosa began playing football at the age of 8 with Escola de Preparação Integral de Futebol in Cape Verde. He moved to the Portuguese club Chaves in 2015, and after a year in the youth academy joined Montalegre on loan in 2016.

== International career ==
Rosa was called up to represent the Cape Verde national team in May 2018 for two international friendlies. He made his debut in a 0-0 (4-3) penalty shootout win over Andorra on 3 June 2018. He was named in the roster for the 2021 Africa Cup of Nations when the team reached the round of 16.

On 18 May 2026, he was called up by Cape Verde's head coach Bubista for the 2026 FIFA World Cup.

== Career statistics ==
=== Club ===
As of match played 6 November 2026

Appearances and goals by club, season and competition
Club	Season	League			National cup (Note: Includes Taça de Portugal, Bulgarian Cup, Cupa României)		Europe		Other		Total	
Club	Season	Division	Apps	Goals	Apps	Goals	Apps	Goals	Apps	Goals	Apps	Goals
Montalegre (loan)	2016–17	Campeonato de Portugal	25	0	0	0	—		—		25	0
Chaves B	2017–18	AF Vila Real Divisão Honra	2	0	—		—		—		2	0
Montalegre	2017–18	Campeonato de Portugal	3	0	—		—		—		3	0
Cova da Piedade	2018–19	LigaPro	0	0	0	0	—		—		0	0
Cova da Piedade	2019–20	LigaPro	0	0	0	0	—		0	0	0	0
Cova da Piedade	2020–21	Liga Portugal 2	1	0	0	0	—		—		1	0
Cova da Piedade	Total		1	0	0	0	—		0	0	1	0
Montalegre	2021–22	Liga 3	16	0	0	0	—		—		16	0
Real SC	2012–13	Liga 3	0	0	2	0	—		—		2	0
Vilafranquense	2022–23	Liga Portugal 2	0	0	—		—		—		0	0
Anadia	2023–24	Liga 3	12	0	0	0	—		—		12	0
Hebar Pazardzhik	2024–25	Bulgarian First League	20	0	1	0	—		—		21	0
Montana	2025–26	Bulgarian First League	19	0	1	0	—		—		20	0
Montana	2026–27	Bulgarian Second League	0	0	—		—		—		0	0
Montana	Total		19	0	1	0	—		—		20	0
UTA Arad	2026–27	Liga I	9	0	2	0	—		—		11	0
Career total			107	0	6	0	—		0	0	113	0

=== International ===
As of match played 6 June 2026

Appearances and goals by national team and year
National team	Year	Apps	Goals
Cape Verde	2018	1	0
Cape Verde	2019	0	0
Cape Verde	2020	0	0
Cape Verde	2021	1	0
Cape Verde	2022	6	0
Cape Verde	2023	0	0
Cape Verde	2024	0	0
Cape Verde	2025	1	0
Cape Verde	2026	2	0
Total		11	0
