= Alibek Aliyev =

Russian-Swedish footballer

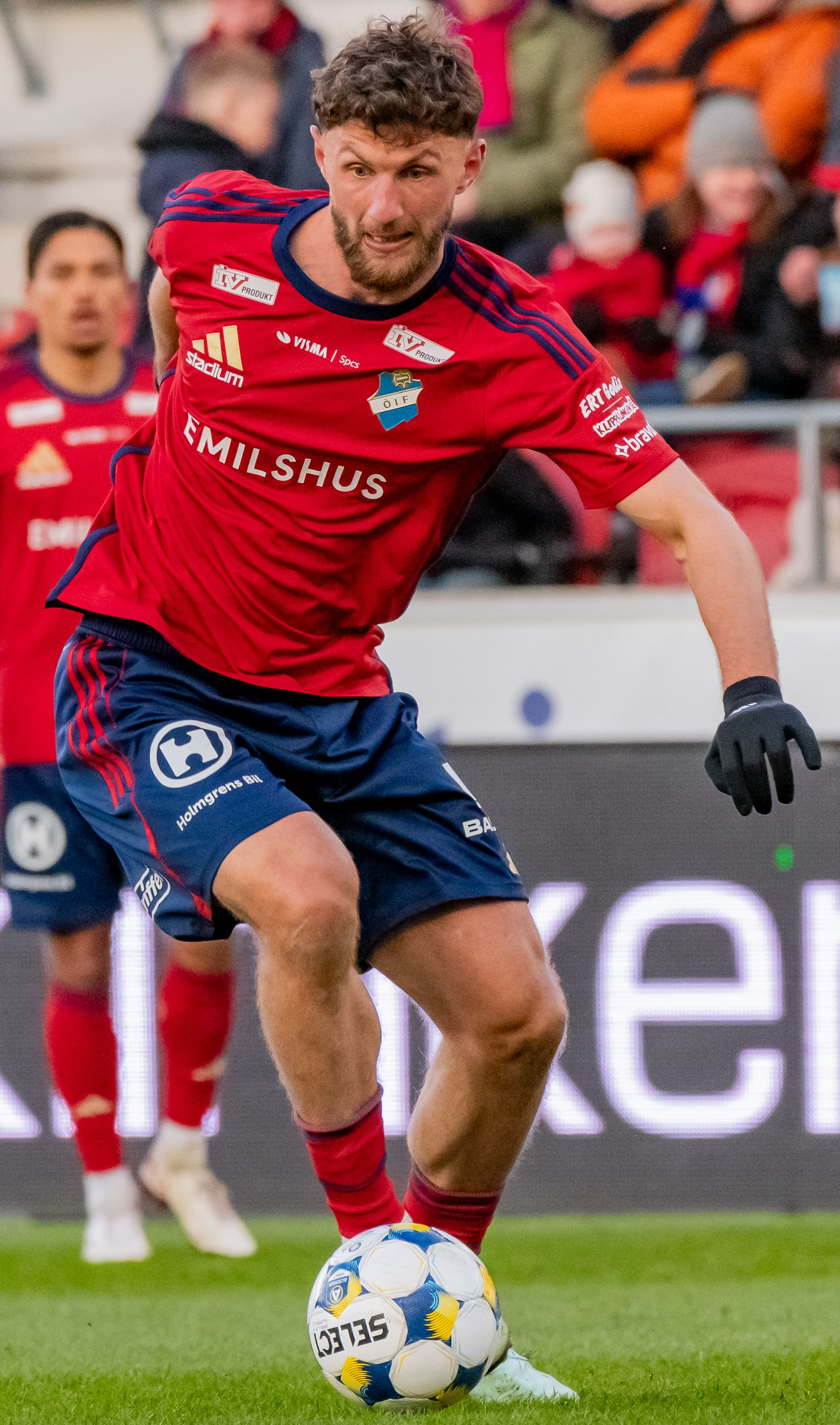

Personal information
- Full name: Alibek Aliyevich Aliyev
- Date of birth: 16 August 1996 (age 30)
- Place of birth: Makhachkala, Russia
- Height: 1.90 m (6 ft 3 in)
- Position: Forward

Team information
- Current team: Universitatea Cluj
- Number: 25

Youth career
- Bäckefors
- –2011: Vänersborg FK
- 2012–2015: Elfsborg
- 2015–2017: CSKA Moscow

Senior career*
Years	Team	Apps	(Gls)
2015–2018	CSKA Moscow	0	(0)
2015–2016	→ Jaro (loan)	18	(2)
2015	→ JBK (loan)	2	(1)
2016	→ GAIS (loan)	9	(2)
2017	→ GAIS (loan)	23	(3)
2018–2019	Örgryte	18	(2)
2018	→ Dalkurd (loan)	2	(0)
2019–2020	Varberg BoIS	15	(1)
2021–2023	Trollhättan	83	(48)
2024–2025	Öster	55	(20)
2026	CFR Cluj	19	(4)
2026–	Universitatea Cluj	12	(6)

International career
2014	Sweden U18	2	(0)
- * Club domestic league appearances and goals as of 19 October 2026

Alibek Aliyevich Aliyev (Russian: Алибек Алиевич Алиев; born 16 August 1996) is a professional footballer who plays as a forward for Liga I club Universitatea Cluj. Born in Russia, Aliyev represented Sweden at youth level.

== Early life ==
Alibek was born in the village of Karabudakhkent to a Kumyk family, Dagestan, and relocated with his family to Sweden at the age of six.

== Club career ==
He started playing football at Bäckefors IF before joining Vänersborgs FK, joining the Elfsborg youth system at the age of 16.

On 22 January 2015, Aliyev signed for CSKA Moscow on a five-year contract. On 28 August 2015, Aliyev signed for FF Jaro on loan for the remainder of the 2015 Veikkausliiga season.

On 12 February 2018, he moved on a permanent basis from CSKA to Örgryte IS. On 11 August 2018, Aliyev joined Dalkurd FF in the Allsvenskan, Sweden's first tier, on loan for the remainder of the season.

On 1 February 2024, Aliyev signed with Öster.

== Career statistics ==
As of match played 28 October 2026

Appearances and goals by club, season and competition
Club	Season	League			National Cup (Note: Includes Svenska Cupen, Cupa României)		Europe		Other		Total	
Club	Season	Division	Apps	Goals	Apps	Goals	Apps	Goals	Apps	Goals	Apps	Goals
Jaro (loan)	2015	Veikkausliiga	10	0	—		—		—		10	0
Jaro (loan)	2016	Ykkönen	8	2	—		—		—		8	2
Jaro (loan)	Total		18	2	—		—		—		18	2
JBK (loan)	2015	Kakkonen	2	1	—		—		—		2	1
GAIS (loan)	2016	Superettan	9	2	1	1	—		—		10	3
GAIS (loan)	2017	Superettan	23	3	1	0	—		—		24	3
GAIS (loan)	Total		32	5	2	1	—		—		34	6
Örgryte	2018	Superettan	10	2	—		—		—		10	2
Örgryte	2019	Superettan	8	0	2	0	—		—		10	0
Örgryte	Total		18	2	2	0	—		—		20	2
Dalkurd (loan)	2018	Allsvenskan	2	0	1	0	—		—		3	0
Varberg BoIS	2019	Superettan	6	1	1	0	—		—		7	1
Varberg BoIS	2020	Allsvenskan	9	0	1	0	—		—		10	0
Varberg BoIS	Total		15	1	2	0	—		—		17	1
Trollhättan	2021	Ettan	27	12	—		—		—		27	12
Trollhättan	2022	Ettan	28	10	3	2	—		—		31	12
Trollhättan	2023	Ettan	28	26	1	0	—		—		29	26
Trollhättan	Total		83	48	4	2	—		—		87	50
Öster	2024	Superettan	26	13	4	3	—		—		30	16
Öster	2025	Allsvenskan	29	7	4	2	—		—		33	10
Öster	Total		55	20	8	5	—		—		63	25
CFR Cluj	2025–26	Liga I	19	4	2	0	—		—		21	4
Universitatea Cluj	2026–27	Liga I	12	6	2	0	4 (Note: Two appearances in UEFA Europa League, two appearances in UEFA Conference League)	0	1 (Note: Appearances in Supercupa României)	1	19	7
Career total			256	89	23	8	4	0	1	1	284	98

== Honours ==
Universitatea Cluj

- Supercupa României runner-up: 2026

Individual

- Ettan top scorer: 2021 (26 goals)
