= Ákos Nistor =

Romanian footballer

Personal information
- Date of birth: 20 November 2004 (age 21)
- Place of birth: Sfântu Gheorghe, Romania
- Height: 1.69 m (5 ft 7 in)
- Position: Midfielder

Team information
- Current team: Sepsi OSK
- Number: 30

Youth career
- –2023: Sepsi OSK

Senior career*
Years	Team	Apps	(Gls)
2022–	Sepsi OSK	5	(0)
2023–2024	→ FK Csíkszereda (loan)	12	(1)
2026	→ Kecskemét (loan)	4	(0)
- * Club domestic league appearances and goals as of 17 May 2026

Ákos Nistor (born 20 November 2004) is a Romanian professional footballer who plays as a midfielder for Liga I club Sepsi OSK.

== Career ==
Nistor made his Liga I debut for Sepsi OSK on 29 April 2022, in a 3–1 away win against Gaz Metan Mediaș.

== Personal life ==
Born in Sfântu Gheorghe, Nistor is of Hungarian ethnicity.
