= Vlad Rafailă =

Romanian footballer (born 2005)

Personal information
- Full name: Vlad Andrei Rafailă
- Date of birth: 17 February 2005 (age 21)
- Place of birth: Mangalia, Romania
- Height: 1.97 m (6 ft 6 in)
- Position: Goalkeeper

Team information
- Current team: Universitatea Cluj
- Number: 34

Youth career
- –2016: Callatis Mangalia
- 2016–2023: Gheorghe Hagi Academy
- 2024–2025: → Lecce (loan)

Senior career*
Years	Team	Apps	(Gls)
2022–2023	Farul II Constanța		
2023–2026	Farul Constanța	0	(0)
2023–2024	→ Dunărea Călărași (loan)		
2025–2026	→ Betis B (loan)	1	(0)
2026–	Universitatea Cluj	0	(0)

International career^{‡}
2019	Romania U15	2	(0)
2020–2021	Romania U16	4	(0)
2021	Romania U17	6	(0)
2022–2023	Romania U18	8	(0)
2023–2024	Romania U19	9	(0)
2024	Romania U20	4	(0)
2025	Romania U21	4	(0)
- * Club domestic league appearances and goals as of 27 August 2026 ‡ National team caps and goals as of 27 August 2026

Vlad Andrei Rafailă (born 17 February 2005) is a Romanian professional footballer who plays as a goalkeeper for Liga I club Universitatea Cluj.

== Career statistics ==
As of 28 March 2026

Appearances and goals by club, season and competition
Club	Season	League			Cupa României		Europe		Other		Total	
Club	Season	Division	Apps	Goals	Apps	Goals	Apps	Goals	Apps	Goals	Apps	Goals
Farul II Constanța	2022–23	Liga III	?	?	—		—		0	0	?	?
Dunărea Călărași (loan)	2023–24	Liga III	?	?	1	0	—		—		?	?
Farul Constanța	2023–24	Liga I	0	0	—		—		—		0	0
Betis B (loan)	2025–26	Primera Federación	1	0	—		—		—		1	0
Universitatea Cluj	2026–27	Liga I	0	0	0	0	—		—		0	0
Career total			1	0	1	0	—		0	0	2	0
