= Muhammed Hayatu =

Nigerian footballer (born 2006)

Personal information
- Full name: Muhammed Alyiu Hayatu
- Date of birth: 4 November 2006 (age 20)
- Place of birth: Ikeja, Nigeria
- Height: 1.72 m (5 ft 8 in)
- Position: Winger

Team information
- Current team: Corvinul Hunedoara
- Number: 14

Youth career
- –2025: Bison FC

Senior career*
Years	Team	Apps	(Gls)
2025–2026	CFR Cluj	0	(0)
2025–2026	→ Corvinul Hunedoara (loan)	23	(0)
2026–	Corvinul Hunedoara	9	(1)
- * Club domestic league appearances and goals as of 7 November 2026

Muhammed Alyiu Hayatu (born 4 November 2006) is a Nigerian professional footballer who plays as a winger for Liga I club Corvinul Hunedoara.

== Honours ==
Corvinul Hunedoara

- Liga II: 2025–26
