= Gustavo Cabral (footballer, born 2001) =

Brazilian footballer (born 2001)

Gustavinho
Personal information
- Full name: Gustavo dos Santos Cabral
- Date of birth: 12 September 2001 (age 25)
- Place of birth: São Paulo, Brazil
- Height: 1.79 m (5 ft 10 in)
- Positions: Attacking midfielder; winger

Team information
- Current team: Vila Nova

Youth career
- –2017: Ponte Preta
- 2018: Oeste
- 2019–2020: Real Brasília
- 2019–2022: Vila Nova
- 2021: → Corinthians (loan)
- 2022: → Verê (loan)

Senior career*
Years	Team	Apps	(Gls)
2023–	Vila Nova	0	(0)
2023	→ Manaus (loan)	14	(2)
2023–2024	→ Al Ahli (loan)		
2024	→ Retrô (loan)	4	(0)
2024	→ CSA (loan)	10	(1)
2025	→ CSA (loan)	12	(0)
2026	→ FK Csíkszereda (loan)	12	(1)
- * Club domestic league appearances and goals as of 8 May 2026

Gustavo dos Santos Cabral (born 12 September 2001), better known as Gustavinho or Gustavo Cabral, is a Brazilian professional footballer who plays as an attacking midfielder or a winger for Campeonato Brasileiro Série B club Vila Nova.
