= Denis Hrezdac =

Romanian professional footballer

Personal information
- Full name: Denis Lucian Hrezdac
- Date of birth: 3 November 2001 (age 25)
- Place of birth: Lugoj, Romania
- Height: 1.82 m (6 ft 0 in)
- Position: Midfielder

Team information
- Current team: Corvinul Hundeoara (on loan from UTA Arad)
- Number: 97

Youth career
- –2016: Vulturii Lugoj
- 2016–2018: UTA Arad

Senior career*
Years	Team	Apps	(Gls)
2018–	UTA Arad	86	(1)
2021	→ Corvinul Hundeoara (loan)		
2022–2023	→ Progresul Pecica (loan)	18	(4)
2023–2024	→ Corvinul Hundeoara (loan)	27	(3)
2026–	→ Corvinul Hundeoara (loan)	9	(0)

International career
2019	Romania U18	2	(0)
- * Club domestic league appearances and goals as of 7 November 2026

Denis Lucian Hrezdac (born 3 November 2001) is a Romanian professional footballer who plays as a midfielder for Liga I club Corvinul Hundeoara, on loan from UTA Arad.

== Club career ==
=== UTA Arad ===
He made his Liga I debut for UTA Arad against Gaz Metan Medias on 2 April 2022.

== Career statistics ==
As of 7 November 2026

Appearances and goals by club, season and competition
Club	Season	League			Cupa României		Europe		Other		Total	
Club	Season	Division	Apps	Goals	Apps	Goals	Apps	Goals	Apps	Goals	Apps	Goals
UTA Arad	2018–19	Liga II	14	0	0	0	—		—		14	0
UTA Arad	2019–20	Liga II	14	0	0	0	—		—		14	0
UTA Arad	2020–21	Liga I	0	0	0	0	—		—		0	0
UTA Arad	2021–22	Liga I	1	0	0	0	—		—		1	0
UTA Arad	2024–25	Liga I	25	1	3	0	—		—		28	1
UTA Arad	2025–26	Liga I	32	0	3	0	—		—		35	0
UTA Arad	Total		86	1	6	0	—		—		92	1
Corvinul Hundeoara (loan)	2020–21	Liga III	?	?	—		—		—		?	?
Progresul Pecica (loan)	2022–23	Liga III	18	4	—		—		—		18	4
Corvinul Hunedoara (loan)	2023–24	Liga II	27	3	7	1	—		—		34	4
Corvinul Hunedoara (loan)	2024–25	Liga II	0	0	—		6 (Note: Four appearances in UEFA Europa League, two appearances in UEFA Conference League)	0	1 (Note: Appearances in Supercupa României)	0	7	0
Corvinul Hunedoara (loan)	Total		27	3	7	1	6	0	1	0	41	4
Corvinul Hundeoara (loan)	2026–27	Liga I	9	0	1	0	—		—		10	0
Career total			140	8	14	1	6	0	1	0	161	9

== Honours ==
UTA Arad

- Liga II: 2019–20

Corvinul Hunedoara

- Cupa României: 2023–24
- Supercupa României runner-up: 2024
