= Robert Petculescu =

Romanian footballer (born 1997)

Personal information
- Full name: Robert Valentin Petculescu
- Date of birth: 12 February 2007 (age 19)
- Place of birth: Bucharest, Romania
- Height: 1.75 m (5 ft 9 in)
- Position: Left winger

Team information
- Current team: Voluntari
- Number: 21

Youth career
- Galactik FK București
- –2023: Progresul Spartac
- 2023–2024: Universitatea Craiova

Senior career*
Years	Team	Apps	(Gls)
2024–2026	Universitatea Craiova	0	(0)
2024–2025	→ Afumați (loan)	23	(3)
2025–2026	→ Voluntari (loan)	23	(3)
2026–	Voluntari	3	(0)

International career^{‡}
2022	Romania U15	5	(3)
2022–2023	Romania U16	17	(4)
2023–2024	Romania U17	14	(2)
2024–2025	Romania U18	12	(1)
2025–	Romania U19	9	(0)
- * Club domestic league appearances and goals as of 23 September 2026 ‡ National team caps and goals as of 23 September 2026

Robert Valentin Petculescu (born 12 February 2007) is a Romanian professional footballer who plays as a left winger for Liga I club Voluntari.
