= Mamadou Diarra (footballer, born 1998) =

French footballer (born 1998)

Personal information
- Date of birth: 25 August 1998 (age 28)
- Place of birth: Ivry-sur-Seine, France
- Height: 1.92 m (6 ft 4 in)
- Position: Centre back

Team information
- Current team: Botoșani
- Number: 94

Youth career
- CFF Paris

Senior career*
Years	Team	Apps	(Gls)
2020–2021	FC Issy		
2021–2022	US Villejuif		
2022–2023	Sainte-Geneviève	16	(3)
2023	Koper	0	(0)
2023–2024	Paris 13 Atletico	11	(0)
2024–2025	Lokomotiv Sofia	17	(2)
2025–2026	Erbil	33	(0)
2026–	Botoșani	10	(0)
- * Club domestic league appearances and goals as of 23 October 2026

Mamadou Diarra (born 25 August 1998) is a French professional footballer who plays as a centre back for Liga I club Botoșani.

== Honours ==
Paris 13 Atletico

- Championnat National 2: 2023–24
