= Flavius Iacob =

Romanian footballer (born 2000)

Personal information
- Date of birth: 30 October 2000 (age 26)
- Place of birth: Călan, Romania
- Height: 1.80 m (5 ft 11 in)
- Position: Right-back

Team information
- Current team: Corvinul Hunedoara
- Number: 13

Youth career
- –2016: Gloria Geoagiu
- 2016–2017: CS Hunedoara

Senior career*
Years	Team	Apps	(Gls)
2017–	Corvinul Hunedoara (Note: The statistics for the 2017–18 Liga IV, 2018–19 Liga III, 2019–20 Liga III, 2020–21 Liga III, 2021–22 Liga III, 2022–23 Liga III seasons are unavailable.)	41	(1)
2024–2025	→ CFR Cluj (loan)	1	(0)
2025–2026	→ UTA Arad (loan)	30	(2)
- * Club domestic league appearances and goals as of 7 November 2026

Flavius Iacob (born 30 October 2000) is a Romanian professional footballer who plays as a right-back for Liga I club Corvinul Hunedoara, which he captains.

== Club career ==
=== Corvinul Hunedoara ===
Iacob started his professional career at Corvinul Hunedoara, having a very important role in their Cupa României winning season.

=== CFR Cluj ===
After his successful season with Corvinul Hunedoara, Iacob went on loan to CFR Cluj.

== Honours ==
Corvinul Hunedoara

- Liga III: 2021–22, 2022–23
- Liga IV – Hunedoara County: 2017–18
- Cupa României: 2023–24
- Supercupa României runner-up: 2024

CFR Cluj

- Cupa României: 2024–25
