= Antonio Dumitru =

Romanian footballer (born 2004)

Personal information
- Full name: Antonio Mihai Dumitru
- Date of birth: 2 November 2004 (age 21)
- Place of birth: Târgoviște, Romania
- Height: 1.78 m (5 ft 10 in)
- Position: Winger

Team information
- Current team: Unirea Alba Iulia

Youth career
- –2018: Kinder Târgoviște
- 2018–2021: Grup Școlar Agricol Nucet

Senior career*
Years	Team	Apps	(Gls)
2021–2022	Corvinul Hunedoara		
2022–2024	Politehnica Iași	26	(1)
2024	→ ACS Mediaș (loan)		
2024–2025	SR Brașov		
2025–2026	Botoșani	8	(0)
2026–	Unirea Alba Iulia	0	(0)
- * Club domestic league appearances and goals as of 19 December 2025

Antonio Mihai Dumitru (born 2 November 2004) is a Romanian professional footballer who plays as a winger for Liga III club Unirea Alba Iulia.

== Honours ==
Corvinul Hunedoara

- Liga III: 2021–22
