= 2026–27 Liga I =

109th season of Liga I in Romania

Liga I
- Season: 2026–27
- Dates: 18 July 2026 – May 2027
- All statistics correct as of 7 June 2026.

The 2026–27 Liga I (also known as Superliga for sponsorship reasons) is the 109th season of Liga I, the top tier of Romanian football. The season began on 18 July 2026 and is scheduled to end in May 2027.

== Overview ==
Sixteen teams competed in the league — thirteen teams from the previous season and three newly promoted sides from Liga II–, of which two were promoted directly and one via the promotion/relegation play-off.

== Teams ==
=== Changes ===
The following teams changed division since the 2025–26 season.

▲ Promoted from Liga II	▼ Relegated to Liga II
Corvinul Hunedoara; Sepsi OSK Sfântu Gheorghe; Voluntari	Unirea Slobozia; Metaloglobus București; Hermannstadt

=== Stadiums and locations ===
Locations of teams in the 2026–27 Liga I
Locations of teams in the 2026–27 Liga I from the Bucharest municipality

Team	Location	Stadium	Capacity
Argeș Pitești	Mioveni	Orășenesc, at Mioveni (Note: Due to the ongoing redevelopment of the Nicolae Dobrin Stadium, Argeș Pitești will play their home matches at Orășenesc Stadium in Mioveni.)	11,000
Botoșani	Botoșani	Botoșani Municipal	7,782
CFR Cluj	Cluj-Napoca	Dr. Constantin Rădulescu	22,198
Corvinul Hunedoara^{↑}	Hunedoara	Petre Libardi, at Petroșani (Note: Due to the ongoing redevelopment of the Complexul Sportiv Corvinul, Corvinul Hunedoara will play their home matches at Petre Libardi Stadium in Petroșani.)	15,500
Csíkszereda Miercurea Ciuc	Miercurea Ciuc	Miercurea Ciuc Municipal (Note: The stadium size is smaller than the required 4,500 but FK Csíkszereda Miercurea Ciuc received permission from the federation to use their own stadium for the upcoming season.)	2,480
Dinamo București	Bucharest	Arena Națională	55,634
Farul Constanța	Ovidiu	Central Stadium of the Gheorghe Hagi	4,554
FCSB	Bucharest	Arena Națională	55,634
Oțelul Galați	Galați	Oțelul	13,500
Petrolul Ploiești	Ploiești	Ilie Oană	15,073
Rapid București	Bucharest	Superbet Arena-Giulești	14,047
Sepsi OSK^{↑}	Sfântu Gheorghe	Sepsi Arena Stadium	8,400
Universitatea Cluj	Cluj-Napoca	Cluj Arena	30,355
Universitatea Craiova	Craiova	Ion Oblemenco	30,983
UTA Arad	Arad	Francisc von Neuman	11,500
Voluntari^{↑}	Voluntari	Anghel Iordănescu	4,518

=== Personnel and kits ===
Note: Flags indicate national team as has been defined under FIFA eligibility rules. Players and Managers may hold more than one non-FIFA nationality.

Team	Manager	Captain	Kit manufacturer	Main Kit sponsor	Other kit sponsor(s)
Argeș Pitești	(Romania national football team) Bogdan Andone	(Romania national football team) Andrei Tofan	(Italy) Macron	Vlad Cazino	List: Front: Catena+; Back: MetaBet CF, One Concept Distribution; Sleeves: Carpatina, Pitești; Shorts: None
Botoșani	(Romania national football team) Marius Croitoru	(Romania national football team) Andrei Miron	(Germany) Adidas	Unibet	List: Front: Electroalfa, Elsaco; Back: None; Sleeves: None; Shorts: None
CFR Cluj	(Romania national football team) Marius Șumudică	(Romania national football team) Mário Camora	(United States) Nike	Don	List: Front: Altenova; Back: Roata Făget; Sleeves: DSC; Shorts: None
Corvinul Hunedoara	(Romania national football team) Florin Maxim	(Romania national football team) Flavius Iacob	(Germany) Adidas	Vbet	List: Front: Primaria Hunedoara, Consiliul Judetean Hunedoara, A-GOAL.com; Back: Axis Holding; Sleeves: A-GOAL.com, Aqua Brava; Shorts: None
Csíkszereda Miercurea Ciuc	(Romania national football team) Valentin Suciu	(Romania national football team) Szilárd Vereș	(Hungary) 2Rule	MOL	List: Front: ZÁÉV, MOL – Új Európa Alapítvány, Csíkszereda; Back: None; Sleeves: None; Shorts: None
Dinamo București	(Portugal national football team) Nuno Campos	(Romania national football team) Cătălin Cîrjan	(Germany) Puma	Superbet	List: Front: Renovatio; Back: Hils, Wonga.com; Sleeves: StayFit Gym, Romstal; Shorts: Allview, Stradale, Carpatina
Farul Constanța	(Romania national football team) Ioan Ovidiu Sabău	(Romania national football team) Ionuț Larie	(United States) Nike	Murfaltar Vinul	List: Front: None; Back: Unibet, Pepsi, Celco; Sleeves: Auchan; Shorts: Kirvad Tour, Mini
FCSB	(Romania national football team) Laurențiu Reghecampf	(Romania national football team) Denis Drăguș	(United States) Nike	Betano	List: Front: None; Back: None; Sleeves: MG; Shorts: None
Oțelul Galați	(Portugal national football team) Rui Duarte	(Romania national football team) Paul Iacob	(Germany) Adidas	Mr Bit	List: Front: Primăria Galați, Consiliului Judeţean Galaţi; Back: Balkan Pharmaceuticals; Sleeves: Valgrig, Scanexpert, A-GOAL.com; Shorts: MMA Security Group
Petrolul Ploiești	(Portugal) Ricardo Sousa	(Romania national football team) Paul Papp	(Italy) Macron	Cashpot	List: Front: Actemium; Back: La Cocos; Sleeves: None; Shorts: None
Rapid București	(Romania national football team) Daniel Pancu	(Netherlands national football team) Lars Kramer	(Italy) Kappa	Napoleon Games	List: Front: IMAMED; Back: Mogo, Plus-Auto; Sleeves: None; Shorts: Sasha & Vlad, Dacris
Sepsi OSK Sfântu Gheorghe	(Romania national football team) Ovidiu Burcă	(Romania national football team) Nicolae Păun	(Germany) Adidas	Diószegi	List: Front: MOL; Back: Gyermelyi; Sleeves: None; Shorts: None
Universitatea Cluj	(Italy national football team) Cristiano Bergodi	(Romania national football team) Alexandru Chipciu	(Germany) Adidas	Mr Bit	List: Front: DeLonghi, AROBS; Back: Banca Transilvania, NOVA Power and Gas; Sleeves: Leier, IRUM; Shorts: Primăria Cluj-Napoca, Visit Cluj, Clinica Sante
Universitatea Craiova	(Portugal national football team) Filipe Coelho	(Romania national football team) Nicușor Bancu	(Germany) Puma	Superbet	List: Front: None; Back: Oscar; Sleeves: Drinks & More Craiova; Shorts: Devin, Vectrum, AliveCapital, Pinum, Ruris
UTA Arad	(Romania national football team) Adrian Mihalcea	(Romania national football team) Alexandru Benga	(United States) Nike	Mr Bit	List: Front: None; Back: Verbita, UTB-Shop, Diva Sol; Sleeves: Pizza 5 Colțuri; Shorts: DEY Security Arad
FC Voluntari	(Romania national football team) Florin Pîrvu	(Romania national football team) Ion Gheorghe	(United States) Nike	Maxbet	List: Front: Izvorul Minunilor; Back: Metropola TV; Sleeves: None; Shorts: None

=== Managerial changes ===
==== Pre-season ====
Team	Outgoing manager	Manner	Date of vacancy	Replaced by	Date of arrival
Csíkszereda	(Romanian Football Federation) Róbert Ilyés	End of contract	16 May 2026	(Hungarian Football Federation) István Szabó	3 June 2026
Rapid București	(Romanian Football Federation) Constantin Gâlcă	Mutual consent	26 May 2026	(Romanian Football Federation) Daniel Pancu	27 May 2026
CFR Cluj	(Romanian Football Federation) Daniel Pancu	Mutual consent	27 May 2026	(Portuguese Football Federation) António Folha	15 June 2026
Farul Constanța	(Romanian Football Federation) Flavius Stoican	Mutual consent	2 June 2026	(Romanian Football Federation) Ioan Sabău	5 June 2026
Dinamo București	(Croatian Football Federation) Željko Kopić	Mutual consent	5 June 2026	(Portuguese Football Federation) Nuno Campos	11 June 2026
Petrolul Ploiești	(Turkish Football Federation) Mehmet Topal	End of contract	6 June 2026	(Portuguese Football Federation) Ricardo Sousa	7 June 2026

==== During the season ====
Team	Outgoing manager	Manner	Date of vacancy	Week	Position in table		Replaced by	Date of appointment
Team	Outgoing manager	Manner	Date of vacancy	Week	Round	Position	Replaced by	Date of appointment
CFR Cluj	(Portuguese Football Federation) António Folha	Sacked	10 August 2026	4	Regular season	12th	(Romanian Football Federation) Marius Șumudică	14 August 2026
Oțelul Galați	(Croatian Football Federation) Stjepan Tomas	Sacked	22 September 2026	10	Regular season	14th	(Portuguese Football Federation) Rui Duarte	28 September 2026
FCSB	(Romanian Football Federation) Marius Baciu	Sacked	23 September 2026	10	Regular season	11th	(Romanian Football Federation) Laurențiu Reghecampf	24 September 2026
Csíkszereda Miercurea Ciuc	(Hungarian Football Federation) István Szabó	Sacked	24 September 2026	10	Regular season	16th	(Romanian Football Federation) Valentin Suciu	24 September 2026

== Regular season ==
=== League table ===
Pos	Team	Pld	W	D	L	GF	GA	GD	Pts	Qualification
1	Universitatea Craiova	16	11	3	2	40	12	+28	36	Advances to Play-off
2	Dinamo București	16	10	3	3	32	12	+20	33	Advances to Play-off
3	Rapid București	15	9	4	2	24	14	+10	31	Advances to Play-off
4	Petrolul Ploiești	16	9	3	4	21	18	+3	30	Advances to Play-off
5	Universitatea Cluj	16	9	2	5	29	22	+7	29	Advances to Play-off
6	Corvinul Hunedoara	16	7	4	5	21	16	+5	25	Advances to Play-off
7	Farul Constanța	16	6	6	4	26	25	+1	24	Advances to Play-out
8	CFR Cluj	16	6	4	6	23	23	0	22	Advances to Play-out
9	FCSB	16	6	4	6	20	21	−1	22	Advances to Play-out
10	UTA Arad	16	5	3	8	18	25	−7	18	Advances to Play-out
11	Sepsi OSK Sfântu Gheorghe	15	4	6	5	11	20	−9	18	Advances to Play-out
12	Botoșani	16	3	7	6	22	23	−1	16	Advances to Play-out
13	Argeș Pitești	16	4	4	8	10	17	−7	16	Advances to Play-out
14	Oțelul Galați	16	2	7	7	19	26	−7	13	Advances to Play-out
15	Voluntari	16	2	3	11	18	36	−18	9	Advances to Play-out
16	Csíkszereda Miercurea Ciuc	16	1	3	12	8	32	−24	6	Advances to Play-out

Updated to match(es) played on 22 November 2026. Source: LPF (in Romanian)
Rules for classification: 1) Points; 2) Head-to-head points; 3) Head-to-head goal difference; 4) Head-to-head goals scored; 5) Goal difference; 6) Goals scored; 7) Play-off.

=== Results ===
Home \ Away	ARG	BOT	CFR	COR	CSI	DIN	FAR	FCS	OTE	PET	RAP	SEP	UCJ	UCV	UTA	VOL
Argeș Pitești		1–1	0–1		1–0		1–1			1–0		0–1			0–1	
Botoșani				0–0	1–0					1–3	1–1	5–0			2–0	
CFR Cluj		3–1				2–2	0–0	1–0	3–2				1–3			5–0
Corvinul Hunedoara			3–0		3–0	1–1						1–1	0–3	0–1		3–2
Csíkszereda Miercurea Ciuc			2–3	0–4		1–3		0–2				0–0		0–1		2–1
Dinamo București		2–0					4–0	2–1		0–1			2–1	5–1		4–0
Farul Constanța		0–0		2–0	3–2				4–3	3–1					4–2	
FCSB	2–0	3–2				a	2–2		1–0	2–2	4–1				1–3	
Oțelul Galați	1–0		2–1	2–3	1–1	1–1					0–1			1–1		
Petrolul Ploiești				2–0	2–0	1–0			1–0		0–2	1–1				
Rapid București	3–1		3–1	2–0		0–1		a		a		1–0		1–1		2–1
Sepsi OSK			3–1			0–2	1–1	0–0					1–0	0–5		
Universitatea Cluj	2–2	2–1	a				2–1		3–0	2–3	3–4				2–1	
Universitatea Craiova	0–1						2–0	5–0		4–0			4–0		4–0	3–1
UTA Arad			1–0	0–0	5–1				2–2		0–0	1–0				
Voluntari	1–0	2–2						1–2	2–2	1–2			0–2		1–0	

Source: LPF (in Romanian)
Legend: Blue = home team win; Yellow = draw; Red = away team win.
For upcoming matches, an "a" indicates there is an article about the rivalry between the two participants.

=== Match results by week ===
Team ╲ Round	1	2	3	4	5	6	7	8	9	10	11	12	13	14	15	16	17	18	19	20	21	22	23	24	25	26	27	28	29	30
Argeș	L	W	W	W	D	L	L	L	D	L	L	D	L																	
Botoșani	D	D	L	D	L	W	D	W	D	L	W	L	L																	
CFR Cluj	L	W	L	L	L	W	W	D	L	W	W	L	D																	
Corvinul	W	L	D	D	W	D	D	L	L	W	W	L	L																	
Csíkszer.	L	L	L	L	D	L	L	L	L	L	L	D	W																	
Dinamo	L	W	D	W	W	W	D	W	W	W	W	W	D																	
Farul	L	W	D	W	D	D	D	D	W	L	W	L	W																	
FCSB	W	W	D	D	W	L	L	L	D	L	W	W	W																	
Oțelul	W	D	D	L	D	W	D	L	L	L	L	D	L																	
Petrolul	W	L	L	W	W	L	W	W	D	W	L	D	W																	
Rapid	W	D	W	D	L	W	D	W	W	W	W	W	L																	
Sepsi	L	W	D	D	D	D	W	L	W	L	L	D	L																	
U Cluj	W	L	W	W	W	L	L	L	W	W	L	D	W																	
Craiova	W	L	W	L	D	W	D	W	W	W	W	W	W																	
UTA Arad	L	D	L	D	L	D	W	W	L	W	L	W	W																	
Voluntari	D	L	W	L	L	L	D	W	L	L	L	L	L																	

Updated to match(es) played on 19 October 2026. Source:
W = Win; D = Draw; L = Loss

=== Position by round ===
Team ╲ Round	1	2	3	4	5	6	7	8	9	10	11	12	13	14	15	16	17	18	19	20	21	22	23	24	25	26	27	28	29	30
Dinamo	12	5	7	4	2	1	1	1	1	1	1	1																		
Rapid	7	3	2	3	8	4	2	2	2	2	2																			
Craiova	1	8	3	6	9	5	3	4	3	3	3																			
Petrolul	6	10	13	8	5	2	4	3	4	4	4																			
U Cluj	5	9	4	7	4	10	12	14	8	5	5																			
Farul	11	6	8	5	7	9	7	5	5	6	6																			
Corvinul	2	7	9	9	6	8	6	9	11	7	7																			
CFR Cluj	10	4	12	13	13	12	11	11	12	8	8																			
FCSB	3	1	1	2	1	3	5	7	7	11	9																			
Botoșani	9	13	14	14	14	13	13	8	9	12	10																			
Sepsi	13	11	10	11	11	11	9	6	6	9	11																			
UTA Arad	16	14	15	15	15	15	14	13	14	10	12																			
Argeș	14	12	5	1	3	7	10	12	10	13	13																			
Oțelul	4	2	6	10	10	6	8	10	13	14	14																			
Voluntari	8	15	11	12	12	14	15	15	15	15	15																			
Csíkszer.	15	16	16	16	16	16	16	16	16	16	16	16	16																	

Leader and Qualification for the Play-off round
Qualification to the Play-off
Qualification to the Play-out

== Play-off round ==
The top six teams from Regular season will meet twice (10 matches per team) for places in UEFA Champions League and UEFA Conference League as well as deciding the league champion. Teams start the Championship round with their points from the Regular season halved, rounded upwards, and no other records carried over from the Regular season.

=== Play-off table ===
Pos	Team	Pld	W	D	L	GF	GA	GD	Pts	Qualification	1	2	3	4	5	6
1	1	0	0	0	0	0	0	0	0	Qualification to Champions League first qualifying round						
2	2	0	0	0	0	0	0	0	0	Qualification to Conference League second qualifying round						
3	3	0	0	0	0	0	0	0	0	Qualification to European competition play-offs						
4	4	0	0	0	0	0	0	0	0							
5	5	0	0	0	0	0	0	0	0							
6	6	0	0	0	0	0	0	0	0							

Source: LPF (in Romanian)
Legend: Blue = home team win; Yellow = draw; Red = away team win.
Rules for classification: 1) Points; 2) Points without rounding; 3) Points in the regular season; 4) Head-to-head points; 5) Head-to-head goal difference; 6) Head-to-head goals scored; 7) Goal difference; 8) Goals scored; 9) Play-off (only if needed to decide champion or teams for UEFA competitions). (Note: only criteria 7 and 8 are applied to establish the classification during the competition.

== Play-out round ==
The bottom ten teams from the regular season meet once to contest against relegation. Teams started the play-out round with their points from the Regular season halved, rounded upwards, and no other records carried over from the Regular season. The winner of the Relegation round finish 7th in the overall season standings, the second placed team – 8th, and so on, with the last placed team in the Relegation round being 16th.

=== Play-out table ===
Pos	Team	Pld	W	D	L	GF	GA	GD	Pts	Qualification or relegation	7	8	9	10	11	12	13	14	15	16
7	7	0	0	0	0	0	0	0	0	Qualification to European competition play-offs										
8	8	0	0	0	0	0	0	0	0	Qualification to European competition play-offs										
9	9	0	0	0	0	0	0	0	0											
10	10	0	0	0	0	0	0	0	0											
11	11	0	0	0	0	0	0	0	0											
12	12	0	0	0	0	0	0	0	0											
13	13	0	0	0	0	0	0	0	0	Qualification to relegation play-offs										
14	14	0	0	0	0	0	0	0	0	Qualification to relegation play-offs										
15	15	0	0	0	0	0	0	0	0	Relegated to Liga II										
16	16	0	0	0	0	0	0	0	0	Relegated to Liga II										

Source: LPF (in Romanian)
Legend: Blue = home team win; Yellow = draw; Red = away team win.
Rules for classification: 1) Points; 2) Points without rounding; 3) Points in the regular season; 4) Head-to-head points; 5) Head-to-head goal difference; 6) Head-to-head goals scored; 7) Goal difference; 8) Goals scored; 9) Play-off (only if needed to decide champion or teams for UEFA competitions). (Note: only criteria 7 and 8 are applied to establish the classification during the competition.

== European play-offs ==
In the semi-final the 7th and 8th-placed teams of the Liga I typically play a one-legged match on the ground of the better placed team (7th place). In the final, the winner of the play-out semi-final will play the highest ranked team of the play-off tournament, that did not already qualify for European competitions. The winner of the final will enter the second qualifying round of the Conference League.

=== Bracket ===
Semi-final	Final
	3
7	7/8
8

=== Matches ===
European play-off semi-final

v

European play-off final

v

== Season statistics ==
=== Top scorers ===
As of 21 November 2026

Rank	Player	Team	Goals
1	(France) Simon Elisor	Universitatea Craiova	9
2	(Romania) Andrei Cordea	CFR Cluj	8
2	(Serbia) Stefan Dražić	CFR Cluj	8
2	(Romania) Andrei Dumiter	Botoșani	8
2	(Bosnia and Herzegovina) Jovo Lukić	Universitatea Cluj	8
6	(Benin) Mattéo Ahlinvi	Farul Constanța	7
6	(Palestine) Assad Al Hamlawi	Universitatea Craiova	7
8	(Sweden) Alibek Aliyev	Universitatea Cluj	6
8	(Scotland) Daniel Armstrong	Dinamo București	6
8	(Romania) Alexandru Dobre	Rapid București	6
8	(Romania) Remus Guțea	Voluntari	6
8	(Romania) Eduard Radaslavescu	Farul Constanța	6

=== Clean sheets ===
As of 22 November 2026

Rank	Player	Team	Clean sheet
1	(Romania) Laurențiu Popescu	Universitatea Craiova	7
2	(Morocco) Alaa Bellaarouch	Dinamo București	6
2	(Czech Republic) Lukáš Zima	Petrolul Ploiești	6
4	(Greece) Giannis Anestis	FC Botoșani	5
4	(Romania) Ștefan Lefter	Universitatea Cluj	5
4	(Romania) Octavian Vâlceanu	CFR Cluj	5
7	(Romania) Marian Aioani	Rapid București	4
7	(Romania) David Lazar	Sepsi OSK	4
7	(Cape Verde) Márcio Rosa	UTA Arad	4
7	(Romania) Codruț Sandu	Corvinul Hunedoara	4
7	(Romania) Ștefan Târnovanu	FCSB	4

=== Hat-tricks ===
As of 23 October 2026

Player	For	Against	Result	Date	Round
Jovo Lukić	Universitatea Cluj	Corvinul Hunedoara	3-0	23 October 2026	13

== Attendances ==
=== Overall ===
As of 26 October 2026

Pos	Team	Total	High	Low	Average	Change
1	Universitatea Craiova	93,635	27,696	8,128	13,376	−13.7%
2	Rapid București	70,274	13,154	7,328	10,039	+1.4%
3	FCSB	67,330	38,353	4,681	9,619	+15.8%^{2}
4	Dinamo București	53,843	14,779	6,592	8,974	−12.0%^{3}
5	CFR Cluj	38,838	10,543	3,159	6,473	+22.6%
6	UTA Arad	37,907	10,342	4,687	6,318	+1.7%
7	Petrolul Ploiești	33,573	8,340	3,231	5,596	+31.2%
8	Oțelul Galați	38,587	9,595	2,703	5,512	+12.7%
9	Sepsi OSK	31,416	7,900	3,180	5,236	n/a^{1}
10	Universitatea Cluj	32,206	9,577	225	4,601	−45.7%^{4}
11	Corvinul Hunedoara	27,906	6,521	1,932	3,987	n/a^{1 5}
12	FC Botoșani	23,121	6,113	1,665	3,854	+8.9%
13	Farul Constanța	16,220	3,220	2,317	2,703	−5.8%
14	FC Argeș	18,395	3,991	1,598	2,628	−27.9%
15	Csíkszereda	7,349	2,250	595	1,225	−19.1%
16	FC Voluntari	6,489	1,760	512	927	n/a^{1}
	League total	597,089	38,353	225	5,741	−0.6%

Updated to match(es) played on 26 October 2026. Source: SuperLiga
Notes:
1) Teams played previous season in Liga II
2) FCSB played 1 home match at Steaua Stadium, 2 home matches at Arcul de Triumf Stadium and 1 home match at Eugen Popescu Stadium
3) Dinamo București played 4 home matches at Arcul de Triumf Stadium
4) Universitatea Cluj played 1 home match at Sepsi Arena Stadium
5) Corvinul Hunedoara played 4 home matches at Francisc von Neuman Stadium

=== Home matches played ===
Team \ Match played	Regular season															Play-off & play-out					Other	Total
Team \ Match played	1	2	3	4	5	6	7	8	9	10	11	12	13	14	15	1	2	3	4	5	Other	Total
Argeș Pitești	2,621	2,693	3,991	3,002	2,327	1,598	2,163															18,395
Botoșani	6,113	4,810	4,612	2,248	3,673	1,665																23,121
CFR Cluj	3,159	8,422	10,543	3,227	3,375	10,112																38,838
Csíkszereda Miercurea Ciuc	1,633	2,250	1,233	1,518	1,200	595																7,349
Corvinul Hunedoara	2,598	1,932	2,853	6,521	4,221	4,481	5,300															27,906
Dinamo București	7,128	7,348	7,567	6,592	14,779	10,429																53,843
Farul Constanța	3,220	2,876	2,978	2,417	2,317	2,412																16,220
FCSB	8,424	4,694	4,681	7,305	9,232	10,211	38,353															67,330
Oțelul Galați	4,743	9,595	7,004	4,613	6,136	3,793	2,703															38,587
Petrolul Ploiești	7,710	5,115	8,340	5,345	3,832	3,231																33,573
Rapid București	10,576	10,142	13,154	12,347	7,934	8,793	7,328															70,274
Sepsi OSK	5,150	7,900	4,320	3,180	6,680	4,186																31,416
Universitatea Cluj	4,118	225	5,317	4,604	4,029	9,577	4,336															32,206
Universitatea Craiova	10,883	9,502	12,232	8,128	14,106	27,696	11,088															93,635
UTA Arad	4,687	10,342	6,496	5,012	5,292	6,078																37,907
FC Voluntari	695	720	1,440	512	517	845	1,760															6,489
League total																						597,089

Source: SuperLiga

== See also ==
- 2026–27 Liga II
- 2026–27 Liga III
- 2026–27 Liga IV
- 2026–27 Cupa României
