= Iosif Kalai =

Romanian footballer

Personal information
- Full name: Iosif Ladislau Kalai
- Date of birth: 2 December 1980 (age 45)
- Place of birth: Petroșani, Romania
- Height: 1.86 m (6 ft 1 in)
- Position: Defender

Team information
- Current team: Inter Petrila

Senior career*
Years	Team	Apps	(Gls)
2000–2002	Inter Petrila	?	(?)
2002–2007	Jiul Petroşani	49	(0)
2007–2009	Politehnica Iaşi	20	(2)
2009	FCM Bacău	8	(1)
2010	Minerul Lupeni	14	(1)
2010–2011	Alro Slatina	17	(2)
2011–2012	Râmnicu Vâlcea	13	(0)
2012	Jiul Petroşani	?	(?)
2013–2014	Retezatul Hațeg	?	(?)
2014	Metalurgistul Cugir	?	(?)
2014	Arieșul Turda	?	(?)
2015–	Inter Petrila	?	(?)
- * Club domestic league appearances and goals as of 3 January 2018

Iosif Ladislau Kalai (Hungarian: Kállai József László) (born 2 December 1980) is a Romanian football player of Hungarian ethnicity. He currently plays for Liga IV side Inter Petrila as a defender. Kalai previously played for Jiul Petroşani, Politehnica Iaşi, FCM Bacău, Minerul Lupeni, Alro Slatina, Râmnicu Vâlcea, Arieșul Turda and Metalurgistul Cugir in the first three football leagues of Romania and for Retezatul Hațeg also in the 4th tier.
