= Tudorache =

Tudorache is a Romanian surname. Notable people with the surname include:

- Dragoș Tudorache (born 1975), Romanian politician
- Marin Tudorache (born 1968), Romanian footballer
- Paula Tudorache (born 1998), Romanian artistic gymnast
- Vlad Tudorache (born 1995), Romanian footballer
