= Ion Panait (footballer) =

Romanian footballer

Personal information
- Full name: Ion Lică Panait
- Date of birth: 5 March 1924
- Place of birth: Bucharest, Romania
- Date of death: 18 August 1981 (aged 57)
- Position: Right back

Youth career
- 1939–1941: Olympia București
- 1941–1942: Carmen București

Senior career*
Years	Team	Apps	(Gls)
1942–1947	Carmen București (Note: The 1940–41 Divizia A was the last season before World War II and the 1946–47 Divizia A was the first one after, so the appearances and goals scored during this period for Carmen București are not official with the exception of the 1945–46 regional championship.)	27	(2)
1947–1948	ASA București	18	(1)
1948–1960	Jiul Petroșani (Note: The 1957 championship called Cupa Primăverii is unofficial, so the appearances at that competition for Jiul Petroșani are not official.)	199	(6)
Total		244	(9)

International career
1957	Romania	1	(0)
- * Club domestic league appearances and goals

Ion Lică Panait (5 March 1924 – 18 August 1981) was a Romanian footballer who played as a right back.

== Club career ==
Panait was born on 5 March 1924 in Bucharest, Romania and began playing junior-level football in 1939 at local club Olympia. In 1941, he moved to Carmen București. He made his Divizia A debut on 25 August 1946 under coach Nicolae Simatoc in Carmen's 3–1 away victory against Jiul Petroșani. He helped the team finish runner-up in the 1946–47 season. In 1947, Panait moved to newly founded club ASA București, where he played under coach Coloman Braun-Bogdan in the team's first Divizia A match, a 0–0 draw against Dermata Cluj. In 1948, he joined Jiul Petroșani, helping the club finish third in his first season. Panait made his last Divizia A appearance on 20 March 1960 in Jiul's 4–0 away loss to Minerul Lupeni, totaling 233 matches with 33 goals in the competition.

== International career ==
Panait made one appearance for Romania on 17 November 1957 under coach Gheorghe Popescu in a 2–0 loss to Yugoslavia in the 1958 World Cup qualifiers.

== Death ==
Panait died on 18 August 1981 at the age of 57.

== Honours ==
Carmen București

- Divizia A runner-up: 1946–47
