= Ionuț Moșteanu =

Ionuț Moșteanu may refer to:

- Ionuț Moșteanu (football manager)
- Ionuț Moșteanu (politician)
