= Ion Dumitra =

Romanian former professional footballer

Personal information
- Date of birth: 30 January 1976 (age 50)
- Place of birth: Balș, Romania
- Height: 1.84 m (6 ft 0 in)
- Position: Midfielder

Senior career*
Years	Team	Apps	(Gls)
1999–2004	Bihor Oradea	102	(4)
2004–2005	Jiul Petroșani	22	(2)
2005–2006	UTA Arad	13	(0)
2006–2007	Minerul Lupeni	29	(2)
2007–2008	Gloria Bistrița	20	(1)
2008–2009	Minerul Lupeni	26	(2)
2009–2011	Alro Slatina	42	(7)
2011–2012	Bihorul Beiuș		(1)
2012–2013	Sânmartin		
2013–2014	Partium Oradea		
2014–2015	Minerul Voivozi–Popești		
2016–2021	Danubius Waldkraiburg	31	(2)
Total		285+	(21+)

Managerial career
- 2008: Minerul Lupeni
- 2012–2013: Sânmartin
- * Club domestic league appearances and goals as of 13:49, 15 June 2021 (UTC)

Ion Dumitra (born 30 January 1976) is a Romanian former professional footballer who played as a midfielder for teams such as Bihor Oradea, Jiul Petroșani, Minerul Lupeni or Alro Slatina, among others.
