= Mosteanu =

Mosteanu is a surname. Notable people with the surname include:

- Ionuț Moșteanu:
  - Ionuț Moșteanu (football manager) (born 1975), Romanian football manager
  - Ionuț Moșteanu (politician) (born 1973), Romanian politician
