= Marian Pâcleșan =

Romanian footballer

Personal information
- Date of birth: 14 October 1974 (age 52)
- Place of birth: Bucharest, Romania
- Height: 1.77 m (5 ft 10 in)
- Position: Central midfielder

Youth career
- Sportul Studențesc București

Senior career*
| Years | Team | Apps | (Gls) |
| 1995–1996 | Unirea Alba Iulia | 21 | (0) |
| 1996–1997 | Sportul Studențesc București | 39 | (1) |
| 1998 | Rocar București | 13 | (1) |
| 1998–1999 | Sportul Studențesc București | 20 | (1) |
| 1999 | FC Universitatea Craiova | 8 | (0) |
| 2000 | Electro Bere Craiova | 13 | (2) |
| 2000–2003 | Ceahlăul Piatra Neamț | 41 | (1) |
| 2003 | UTA Arad | 3 | (0) |
| 2004–2007 | Jiul Petroșani | 100 | (3) |
| Total | | 258 | (9) |
- * Club domestic league appearances and goals

Marian Pâcleșan (born 14 October 1974) is a Romanian former footballer who played as a midfielder. In 2012, after ending his football career, Pâcleșan started to work as a lawyer.

== Honours ==
Jiul Petroșani

- Divizia B: 2003–04
