= Cosmin Chetroiu =

Romanian luger (born 1987)

Cosmin Chetroiu (born 31 March 1987) is a Romanian luger who has competed since 1999. Competing in two Winter Olympics, he earned his best finish of 17th in the men's doubles event at Vancouver in 2010.

He was born in Petroşani.

Chetroiu's best finish at the FIL World Luge Championships was 17th in the doubles event twice (2008, 2009). His best finish at the FIL European Luge Championships was 15th in the doubles event at Cesana in 2008.
