= Mircea Popa =

Romanian footballer

Personal information
- Date of birth: 21 June 1962 (age 64)
- Place of birth: Petroșani, Romania
- Position: Right-back

Senior career*
Years	Team	Apps	(Gls)
1979–1980	Jiul Petroșani	1	(0)
1980–1981	Minerul Lupeni		
1981–1985	Jiul Petroșani	73	(5)
1985–1992	Sportul Studențesc București	171	(10)
1992	Progresul București	7	(0)
1993–1995	Jiul Petroșani (Note: The statistics for the 1992–93 and 1993–94 Divizia B seasons are unavailable.)	22	(0)
Total		274	(15)

International career
1988	Romania	3	(0)
- * Club domestic league appearances and goals

Mircea Popa (born 21 June 1962) is a Romanian former football right-back. His son, Horațiu Popa was also a footballer.

== International career ==
Mircea Popa played three friendly games at international level for Romania, making his debut in a 2–2 against Poland when he came as a substitute, replacing Mircea Rednic at half-time.
