= Andreea Țîrle =

Romanian handball player (born 2002)

Personal information
- Born: 2 April 2002 (age 24) Petroșani, Romania
- Height: 1.77 m (5 ft 10 in)

Sport
- Sport: Handball
- Position: Pivot
- Current club: Minaur Baia Mare
- Number: 23

Youth career
- Years: Team
- –: CS Arena Târgu Mureș

Senior clubs
- Years: Team
- 2020–2021: SCM Râmnicu Vâlcea
- 2021–: Minaur Baia Mare
National team
- Years: Team
- 2022–: Romania
- Updated on 7 November 2022

Andreea Bianca Țîrle (born 2 April 2002) is a Romanian handball player who plays as a line player for Minaur Baia Mare and the Romania national team.

She represented Romania at the 2022 European Championship.
