= Ion Nițu =

Romanian footballer

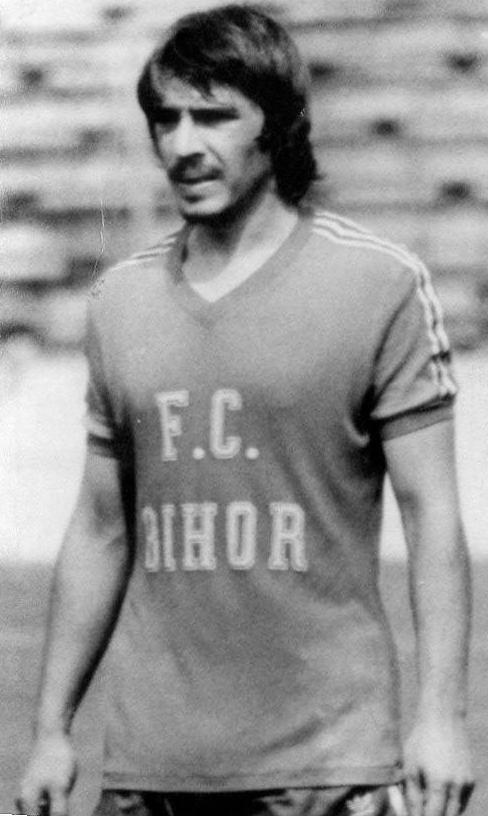

Personal information
- Date of birth: 31 July 1952
- Place of birth: Bucharest, Romania
- Date of death: 15 June 2004
- Place of death: Bucharest, Romania
- Position: Central defender

Youth career
- 1971–1972: Steaua București

Senior career*
| Years | Team | Apps | (Gls) |
| 1972–1973 | Steaua București | 1 | (0) |
| 1973–1976 | Jiul Petroșani | 100 | (2) |
| 1976–1981 | Steaua București | 81 | (0) |
| 1981–1985 | Bihor Oradea | 93 | (0) |
| 1986 | Înfrățirea Oradea | 10 | (0) |
| Total | | 285 | (2) |
- * Club domestic league appearances and goals

Ion Nițu (born 31 July 1952 – 15 June 2004) was a Romanian footballer who played as a defender for teams such as Steaua București, Jiul Petroșani and Bihor Oradea, among others.

== Honours ==
Jiul Petroșani

- Cupa României: 1973–74

Steaua București

- Divizia A: 1973–74
- Cupa României: 1978–79

Bihor Oradea

- Divizia B: 1981–82
