= Aurel Crâsnic =

Romanian footballer (1926–1968)

Personal information
- Date of birth: 11 May 1926
- Place of birth: Lonea, Romania
- Date of death: 2 February 1968 (aged 41)
- Height: 1.68 m (5 ft 6 in)
- Position: Goalkeeper

Senior career*
Years	Team	Apps	(Gls)
1940–1950	Parângul Lonea		
1950–1962	Jiul Petroșani (Note: The 1957 championship called Cupa Primăverii is unofficial, so the appearances at that competition for Jiul Petroșani are not official.)	205	(1)

International career
1952	Romania	1	(0)
- * Club domestic league appearances and goals

Aurel Crâsnic (11 May 1926 – 2 February 1968) was a Romanian footballer who played as a goalkeeper.

== Club career ==
Crâsnic was born on 11 May 1926 in Lonea, Romania and began playing football in 1940 at local club, Parângul. In 1950, he joined Jiul Petroșani. He made his Divizia A debut on 26 March 1950 under coach Geza Nagy-Csomag in a 5–0 away loss to Locomotiva Timișoara. In June 1960, he scored his only league goal from a penalty in a 1–1 draw against Farul Constanța. However, the team was relegated at the end of that season, but Crâsnic stayed with the club, helping them gain promotion back to the first league one year later. On 1 July 1962, he made his last Divizia A appearance in Jiul's 7–0 home win over Metalul Târgoviște, totaling 205 matches with one goal in the competition.

== International career ==
Crâsnic played one friendly game for Romania, when coach Gheorghe Popescu sent him in the 79th minute to replace Ion Voinescu in a 1–0 victory against Poland. He was part of Romania's squad for the 1952 Summer Olympics.

== Personal life and death ==
Around 1950, Crâsnic was sent to forced labor at the Danube–Black Sea Canal by Romania's communist regime.

He died on 2 February 1968 at age 41.

== Honours ==
Jiul Petroșani

- Divizia B: 1960–61
