= Nicușor Bănică =

Romanian footballer

Personal information
- Full name: Nicușor Răzvan Bănică
- Date of birth: 7 January 1984 (age 42)
- Place of birth: Balș, Romania
- Height: 1.82 m (6 ft 0 in)
- Position: Goalkeeper

Team information
- Current team: Metalurgistul Cugir
- Number: 33

Youth career
- Minerul Moldova-Nouă

Senior career*
Years	Team	Apps	(Gls)
2002–2009	FC U Craiova	7	(0)
2005–2006	→ Poiana Câmpina (loan)	4	(0)
2008–2009	→ Minerul Lupeni (loan)	16	(0)
2009	Drobeta Turnu-Severin	0	(0)
2010	Pandurii Târgu Jiu	0	(0)
2011–2012	Alro Slatina	0	(0)
2012–2014	Pandurii II Târgu Jiu		
2014–2015	FC Romania		
2015	Minerul Motru		
2016	Mureșul Vințu de Jos		
2016–2017	Șurianu Sebeș		
2017–	Metalurgistul Cugir	189	(0)
Total		216	(0)

Managerial career
- 2010: Pandurii II Târgu Jiu (assistant)
- 2022: FC U Craiova II (GK Coach)
- 2022–: Metalurgistul Cugir (GK Coach)
- * Club domestic league appearances and goals as of 12:28, 25 December 2024 (UTC)

Nicușor Răzvan Bănică (born 7 January 1984) is a Romanian former footballer who plays as a goalkeeper for Metalurgistul Cugir. In his career, he also played for teams such as FC U Craiova, Poiana Câmpina, FC Drobeta Turnu-Severin or Metalurgistul Cugir, among others. In 2010, for a short period, he was the assistant manager of Pandurii II Târgu Jiu.

== Honours ==
Metalurgistul Cugir

- Liga III: 2020–21
