= Petroșani Mining Museum =

Museum in Romania

Coordinates: 45.4165°N 23.3712°E

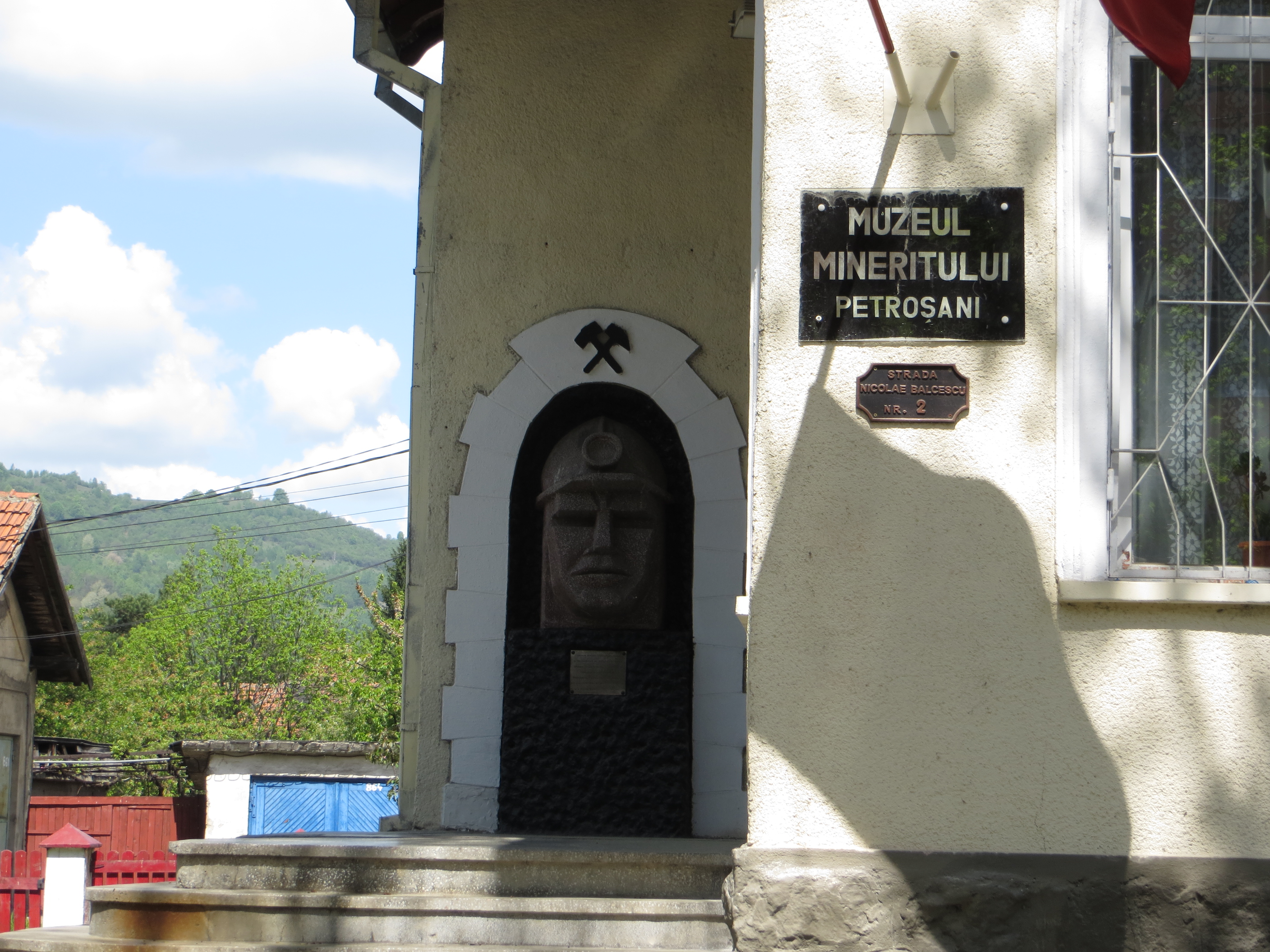
Petroșani Mining Museum, entrance

The Petroșani Mining Museum (Romanian: Muzeul Mineritului Petroșani) is a museum centered on coal mining and located in the Jiu Valley city of Petroșani, Hunedoara County, Romania.

The museum was founded in 1961 and initially located in a house at 1 Ion Creangă Street, on land now occupied by the Central Park. A number of modifications were made to the structure, such as the removal of the doors and their frames, the space being converted into vaulted ceilings. The museum's first exhibition was dedicated to the Cuban Revolution and was held in the State Theater hall. Until 1966, the museum was more of a storage facility, as its gallery space was very small. That year, it moved into the current headquarters, located at 2 Nicolae Bălcescu Street. The building, dating to 1920 and considered a historic monument by the country's Culture Ministry, was the first headquarters of the S. A. R. Petroșani firm and originally served as company housing for employees. A numismatics exhibition was inaugurated in 1970. The museum underwent extensive renovations between 1996 and 1998.

The collection includes some 1500 items related to mining, including equipment, tools, clothing, documents, sketches, insignia and objects peculiar to the region. It is the country's only museum that focuses on coal-mining technology.
