= Dragu Bădin =

Romanian footballer (1947–2023)

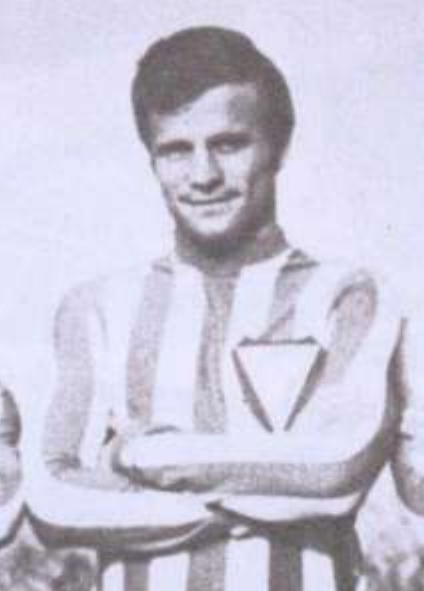
- Bădin with Petrolul Ploiești in 1970

Personal information
- Date of birth: 7 August 1947
- Place of birth: Brăila, Romania
- Date of death: 30 July 2023 (aged 75)
- Position: Central defender

Senior career*
Years	Team	Apps	(Gls)
1965–1967	Progresul Brăila		
1967–1968	Șoimii Buzău		
1968–1972	Petrolul Ploiești	96	(7)
1972–1975	Universitatea Craiova	70	(3)
1975–1976	FCM Bacău	11	(0)
1976–1980	Jiul Petroșani	124	(9)
1980–1981	Mecanica Fină București		
Total		301	(19)

International career
1969	Romania U23	2	(0)
- * Club domestic league appearances and goals

Dragu Bădin (7 August 1947 – 30 July 2023) was a Romanian footballer who played as a defender.

Bădin was part of "U" Craiova's team that won the 1973–74 Divizia A, which was the club's first trophy.

== Club career ==
Bădin was born on 7 August 1947 in Brăila, Romania and began playing football in 1965 at Divizia B club Progresul Brăila. In 1967 he went to Șoimii Buzău. One year later he moved to Petrolul Ploiești, making his Divizia A debut on 21 September 1968 under coach Ilie Oană in a 1–0 away win over Progresul București.

In 1972, Bădin joined Universitatea Craiova where he was close to winning the title in his first season, but they finished in second place on equal points with Dinamo București, losing controversially on goal difference. This outcome led poet Adrian Păunescu to nickname Craiova as "Campioana unei mari iubiri" (The Champion of a great love). In the first round of the 1973–74 UEFA Cup season, "U" Craiova got past Fiorentina, being eliminated in the following one by Standard Liège, with Bădin playing three games in the campaign. In the same season, he was part of Craiova's team that won the league title, which was the club's first trophy, being used by coach Constantin Cernăianu in 25 games. Then he played in a 3–1 loss to Åtvidaberg in the first round of the European Cup, scoring his side's goal. The team reached the 1975 Cupa României final, but coach Cernăianu did not use him in the eventual 2–1 loss against Rapid București.

In 1975 he went to play for one season at FCM Bacău. Subsequently, Bădin joined Jiul Petroșani where on 21 May 1980, he made his last Divizia A appearance in a 2–2 draw against Dinamo, totaling 301 matches with 19 goals in the competition. Afterwards he joined Mecanica Fină București where he ended his career in 1981.

== International career ==
Bădin played two matches for Romania's under-23 team in 1969.

== Personal life and death ==
In 2023, Bădin received the Honorary Citizen of Craiova title.

He died on 30 July 2023, at the age of 75.

== Honours ==
Universitatea Craiova

- Divizia A: 1973–74
- Cupa României runner-up: 1974–75
