= Grigore Ciupitu =

Romanian footballer

Personal information
- Date of birth: 13 September 1948 (age 78)
- Place of birth: Bucharest, Romania
- Height: 1.78 m (5 ft 10 in)
- Positions: Forward; left back; sweeper

Youth career
- Dinamo București

Senior career*
Years	Team	Apps	(Gls)
1967–1970	Progresul Brăila (Note: The statistics for the 1967–68 Divizia C season are unavailable.)	54	(30)
1970–1974	Petrolul Ploiești	101	(3)
1975–1976	Universitatea Craiova	43	(0)
1976–1980	Jiul Petroșani	124	(8)
1980–1983	Universitatea Craiova	44	(0)
1983	Chimia Râmnicu Vâlcea	8	(0)
1984	Constructorul Craiova	16	(2)
1984–1985	Drobeta-Turnu Severin	14	(1)
Total		404	(44)

Managerial career
- Aurul Brad
- * Club domestic league appearances and goals

Grigore Ciupitu (born 13 September 1948) is a Romanian former footballer who started his career as a forward, but later played as a left defender and sweeper.

== Career ==
Ciupitu was born on 13 September 1948 in Bucharest, Romania and began playing junior-level football at local club Dinamo. In 1967, he started his senior career at Divizia C club Progresul Brăila, helping his side gain second-league promotion at the end of the season. A few years later, Ciupitu joined Petrolul Ploiești where he made his Divizia A debut under coach Constantin Cernăianu on 14 March 1971 in a 3–0 away loss to Politehnica Iași. At the beginning of his spell with The Yellow Wolves, Ciupitu formed a partnership in the offence with Mircea Dridea. However, he changed positions from forward to left back after Mihai Mocanu got injured. At the end of the 1973–74 season, Petrolul was relegated, but he stayed with the club for another half a year in Divizia B.

Ciupitu joined Universitatea Craiova in 1975. He played the entire match under coach Cernăianu in the 2–1 loss to Rapid București in the 1975 Cupa României final. Subsequently, he played in both legs in the 4–2 aggregate loss to Red Star Belgrade in the first round of the 1975–76 UEFA Cup. In 1976, Ciupitu went to play for a four-season spell at Jiul Petroșani. The team reached the 1977–78 Balkans Cup final, with Ciupitu playing in both legs of their 4–2 aggregate defeat to Rijeka. Afterwards, he made a comeback to "U" Craiova, being part of the "Craiova Maxima" generation. Ciupitu helped the club win the 1980–81 title, playing 20 matches under coach Ion Oblemenco. Following this success, they reached the quarter-finals in the 1981–82 European Cup by eliminating Kjøbenhavns Boldklub, with Ciupitu playing two games in the campaign, being defeated by Bayern Munich. He also made two appearances in the 1982–83 UEFA Cup, including the 0–0 draw in the first leg of the semi-final against Benfica, as the team got eliminated after 1–1 on aggregate on the away goal rule.

In 1983, Ciupitu joined Chimia Râmnicu Vâlcea. There, he made his last Divizia A appearance on 1 November 1983 in a 1–1 draw against his former side, "U" Craiova, totaling 320 matches with 11 goals in the competition. Afterwards, he went to play for Divizia B club Constructorul Craiova. Ciupitu ended his career, after playing during the 1984–85 Divizia B season for Drobeta-Turnu Severin.

== After retirement ==
After he ended his playing career, Ciupitu coached Aurul Brad for a short while. Subsequently, he worked as a police officer.

== Personal life ==
In 2003, Ciupitu received the Honorary Citizen of Craiova title.

== Honours ==
Jiul Petroșani

- Balkans Cup runner-up: 1977–78

Universitatea Craiova

- Divizia A: 1980–81
- Cupa României runner-up: 1974–75
