= CS Metalurgistul Cugir =

Romanian football club

Metalurgistul Cugir
- Full name: Club Sportiv Metalurgistul Cugir
- Nicknames: Trupa de sub Drăgana (The Band Below Drăgana Hill)
- Short name: Cugir
- Founded: 1939; 87 years ago as Metalurgistul Cugir; 2008; 18 years ago as CSO Cugir
- Ground: Arena Cugir
- Capacity: 4,000 (1,200 seated)
- Owner: Cugir Town
- Chairman: Ciprian Pahone
- Head Coach: Lucian Itu
- League: Liga III
- 2025–26: Liga III, Seria IV, 7th
Home colours	Away colours

Club Sportiv Metalurgistul Cugir commonly known as Metalurgistul Cugir, is a Romanian football club based in Cugir, Alba County, currently playing in the Liga III, the third tier of the Romanian football.

Metalurgistul Cugir was founded in 1939 and played twenty-six seasons in the second tier of Romanian football, along with two seasons in the Heroes' Cup, a competition that replaced Divizia B during the World War II period.

== History ==
The team was founded in 1939 with the support of the management of the Cugir Metallurgical Plant, under the name Asociația Sportivă Metalurgistul Cugir (ASM Cugir).

Romania's entry into World War II suspended sports competitions. However, during the war, the Romanian Football Federation organized the War Championship and the Heroes Cup. The 1942–43 season of the Heroes Cup – a competition that replaced the second division between 1942 and 1944 – was organized into three series based on geographical criteria. The "Uzinele Metalurgice Cugir" team, guided by player-coach Grațian Sepi – a former Romania national football team player with 14 goals in 23 appearances – dominated the strong Serie II, consisting of ten teams, finishing with a three-point lead over Jiul Petroșani. In the promotion play-off against UA Brașov, the winner of Series III, "Cugirenii" won the first match played in Cugir 5–0, and a week later in Brașov, the match ended in a 1–1 draw. In the end, UM Cugir missed promotion to the War Championship – the first division at that time – losing to UD Reșița, the winner of Series I, after a spectacular two-legged tie (5–3 and 0–5).

After the end of World War II, UM Cugir competed in the 1946–47 season of Divizia C, finishing 8th out of 10 in Series X, and reached the Round of 32 of the Cupa României in the 1947–48 season, being eliminated by CFR Timișoara, 1–4. The team also participated in the 1948–49 season of the third division, this time under the name Metalul Cugir. By the time Divizia C was shut down in February 1949, the team was in last place out of 14 in Series I.

In the 1961–62 season, AS Cugir won the Hunedoara Regional Championship title and was subsequently promoted to Divizia B after finishing 1st in Series III of the promotion play-off held in Mediaș. Among those who were part of the team led by player-coach Iosif Petschovschi were goalkeeper Rusu and field players Niculescu, Sadi, Dumitru Dinea, Munteanu, Tîrnoveanu, Dumitru, Focșa, Bulbucan, Boitoș, Petschovschi II and Mihai.

In Divizia B, the team was coached by Colea Vâlcov for the following two seasons, finishing 6th in Series III in 1962–63 and 5th in Series II in 1963–64, after the second division was reduced to two series in 1963.

== Honours ==
- Liga III
  - Winners (3): 1981–82, 1989–90, 2020–21
  - Runners-up (6): 1985–86, 1988–89, 2003–04, 2014–15, 2016–17, 2021–22
- Liga IV – Alba County
  - Winners (1): 2012–13
  - Runners-up (1): 2011–12
- Liga V – Alba County
  - Winners (1): 2009–10
  - Runners-up (1): 2008–09

== Players ==
=== First team squad ===
As of 10 September 2024

Note: Flags indicate national team as defined under FIFA eligibility rules; some limited exceptions apply. Players may hold more than one non-FIFA nationality.

No.	Pos.	Nation	Player
1	GK	ROU	Vlad Bogdan Cindeni
2	DF	ROU	Denis Cunțan
4	DF	ROU	Vlăduț Popa
9	FW	ROU	Florin Bura
10	MF	ROU	Paul Păcurar
11	MF	ROU	Tudor Șaucă (Captain)
12	GK	ROU	Cristian Perjeriu
16	DF	ROU	George Tăban
18	MF	ROU	Philip Mahone
20	DF	ROU	Alin Șuteu
23	MF	ROU	Gheorghe Haprianu
25	FW	ROU	George Goronea

No.	Pos.	Nation	Player
27	DF	ROU	Alexandru Király
28	DF	ROU	Lucian Itu
33	GK	ROU	Nicușor Bănică
64	MF	ROU	Andrei Onaci
73	FW	ROU	Marcel Domșa
77	MF	ROU	Cristian Cocan
81	FW	ROU	Marian Codrea
88	DF	ROU	Mihai Udrea
91	MF	ROU	Alessandro Barbu
97	MF	ROU	Raul Chițimia
98	MF	ROU	Mihai Păcurar
99	GK	ROU	Ianis Herlea

=== Out on loan ===
Note: Flags indicate national team as defined under FIFA eligibility rules; some limited exceptions apply. Players may hold more than one non-FIFA nationality.

No. / Pos. / Nation / Player	No. / Pos. / Nation / Player

== Club Officials ==
=== Board of directors ===
Role	Name
Owner	(Romania) Town of Cugir
President	(Romania) Ciprian Pahone
Vice-president	(Romania) Daniel Popa
Board member	(Romania) Sorin Tomescu

=== Current technical staff ===
Role	Name
Manager	(Romania) Lucian Itu
Assistant coach	(Romania) Traian Avram
Goalkeeping coach	(Romania) Nicușor Bănică
Club doctor	(Romania) Cristian Dima
Kinetotherapist	(Romania) Aurel Radu

== Former players ==
- (Romania) Vasile Chiroiu
- (Romania) Alexandru Moldovan
- (Romania) Iosif Petschovschi
- (Romania) Grațian Sepi
- (Romania) Constantin Zamfir

== Former managers ==
- (Romania) Rudolf Kotormány (1954–1956)
- (Romania) Iosif Petschovschi (1961–1962)
- (Romania) Colea Vâlcov (1962–1964)
- (Romania) Gheorghe Bărbulescu (1964)
- (Romania) Gheorghe Dungu (1965–1966)
- (Romania) Ștefan Onisie (1979–1981)
- (Romania) Ion Barbu (1982–1983)
- (Romania) Călin Moldovan (2015–2019)
- (Romania) Lucian Itu (2019–)
- (Romania) Ladislau Băcuț

== League history ==
Season	Tier	Division	Place	Notes	Cupa României
2026–27	3	Liga III	TBD		
2025–26	3	Liga III (Seria VII)	6th		
2024–25	3	Liga III (Seria VII)	6th		
2023–24	3	Liga III (Seria IX)	7th		
2022–23	3	Liga III (Seria IX)	4th		
2021–22	3	Liga III (Seria IX)	2nd		
2020–21	3	Liga III (Seria IX)	1st (C)		
2019–20	3	Liga III (Seria V)	4th		
2018–19	3	Liga III (Seria IV)	5th		
2017–18	3	Liga III (Seria V)	4th		
2016–17	3	Liga III (Seria V)	2nd		Round of 32
2015–16	3	Liga III (Seria IV)	3rd		
2014–15	3	Liga III (Seria V)	2nd		
2013–14	3	Liga III (Seria V)	3rd		
2012–13	4	Liga IV (AB)	1st (C)	Promoted	
2011–12	4	Liga IV (AB)	2nd		
2010–11	4	Liga IV (AB)	3rd		
2009–10	5	Liga V (AB)	1st (C)	Promoted	

Season	Tier	Division	Place	Notes	Cupa României
2008–09	5	Liga V (AB)	2nd		
2003–04	3	Divizia C (Seria VII)	2nd	Disbanded	
2002–03	3	Divizia C (Seria VI)	7th		
2001–02	3	Divizia C (Seria VI)	7th		
2000–01	3	Divizia C (Seria VI)	12th		
1999–00	3	Divizia C (Seria IV)	14th		
1998–99	3	Divizia C (Seria IV)	17th		
1997–98	3	Divizia C (Seria IV)	14th		
1996–97	3	Divizia C (Seria IV)	11th		
1995–96	3	Divizia C (Seria IV)	14th		
1994–95	3	Divizia C (Seria IV)	7th		Round of 16
1993–94	3	Divizia C (Seria III)	8th		Round of 32
1992–93	2	Divizia B (Seria II)	17th (R)	Relegated	
1991–92	2	Divizia B (Seria II)	11th		
1990–91	2	Divizia B (Seria III)	13th		
1989–90	3	Divizia C (Seria XI)	1st (C)	Promoted	Round of 16
1988–89	3	Divizia C (Seria IX)	2nd		
1987–88	3	Divizia C (Seria X)	5th		
