= Cornel Irina =

Romanian footballer

Personal information
- Full name: Cornel Reluș Irina
- Date of birth: 7 December 1976 (age 49)
- Place of birth: Petroșani, Romania
- Height: 1.80 m (5 ft 11 in)
- Position: Defender

Youth career
- Jiul Petroșani

Senior career*
Years	Team	Apps	(Gls)
1996–2005	Jiul Petroșani	198	(16)
2005	Unirea Alba Iulia	13	(0)
2006–2007	Corvinul 2005 Hunedoara	30	(4)
2008–2009	Minerul Lupeni	45	(2)
2009–2010	Retezatul Hațeg	28	(?)
2010–2019	Minerul Uricani	200	(?)
Total		540+	(22+)

Managerial career
- 2010–2019: Minerul Uricani (assistant)
- 2019–2022: Jiul Petroșani (youth)
- 2025-present: CSM Vulcan
- * Club domestic league appearances and goals as of 10 April 2020

Cornel Reluș Irina (born 7 December 1976) is a Romanian former professional footballer who played as a defender. In his career Irina played in over 200 matches for Jiul Petroșani and was also the captain of "the Miners".

Nicknamed "the Bomber" by Jiul's supporters Irina moved in 2005 at Unirea Alba Iulia, but after half of the season moved back in Hunedoara County, this time signing a contract with Corvinul 2005 Hunedoara. In the winter of 2008, Irina signed with Minerul Lupeni, where he was an important player at the level of Liga II, but after a match lost against ACU Arad, Irina had a conflict with the management of the club and left Minerul for Liga III side Retezatul Hațeg.

After a season spent with Retezatul, Irina moved to Minerul Uricani, where he played in over 200 matches, at the level of Liga IV.

== Honours ==
Jiul Petroșani

- Divizia B: 2004–05
- Divizia C: 2002–03
