= Tudorel Zamfirescu =

Romanian footballer

Personal information
- Full name: Tudorel Vișan Zamfirescu
- Date of birth: 5 June 1969 (age 57)
- Place of birth: Bucharest, Romania
- Position: Central defender

Senior career*
Years	Team	Apps	(Gls)
1993	Unirea Tricolor Oltenița		
1994–1996	Sportul Studențesc București	72	(8)
1996	Steaua București	13	(0)
1997	Jiul Petroșani	15	(1)
1997	Sportul Studențesc București	15	(0)
1998	Chindia Târgoviște	7	(0)
1998	Sportul Studențesc București	14	(0)
1999	Olimpia Satu Mare	10	(0)
1999	Juventus București	4	(0)
1999–2002	TSV Ampfing	68	(10)
Total		218	(19)
- * Club domestic league appearances and goals

Tudorel Vișan Zamfirescu (born 5 June 1969) is a Romanian former footballer who played as a central defender.

== Honours ==
Steaua București

- Divizia A: 1996–97
- Cupa României: 1996–97
