= Vlad Tudorache =

Romanian footballer

Personal information
- Full name: Vlad Marian Tudorache
- Date of birth: 16 February 1995 (age 31)
- Place of birth: Petroșani, Romania
- Height: 1.74 m (5 ft 9 in)
- Position: Midfielder

Team information
- Current team: CS Dinamo
- Number: 8

Youth career
- Jiul Petroșani

Senior career*
Years	Team	Apps	(Gls)
2012	Jiul Petroșani		
2013	Universitatea Petroșani		
2013–2015	Dinamo II București		
2016	Voluntari II		
2016–2018	Afumați	62	(10)
2018–2019	Energeticianul	27	(4)
2019–2021	Ripensia Timișoara	41	(1)
2021–2024	Afumați	59	(6)
2024–	CS Dinamo	15	(0)

International career^{‡}
2011	Romania U-17	1	(0)
- * Club domestic league appearances and goals as of 11:55, 21 December 2024 (UTC) ‡ National team caps and goals as of 12 March 2018

Vlad Marian Tudorache (born 16 February 1995) is a Romanian professional footballer who plays as a midfielder for Liga III side CS Dinamo București. Tudorache made his debut at senior level for Jiul Petroșani at only 17 years old, then he played for Universitatea Petroșani and second teams of Dinamo București and FC Voluntari until he transferred to Afumați in the summer of 2016.

His father, Marin Tudorache, is also a former footballer and currently a manager.
