= Alexandru Pătlăgică =

Romanian professional footballer

Personal information
- Full name: Alexandru Petrică Pătlăgică
- Date of birth: 28 March 2003 (age 23)
- Place of birth: Uricani, Romania
- Height: 1.81 m (5 ft 11 in)
- Position: Right back

Team information
- Current team: Jiul Petroșani
- Number: 22

Youth career
- Minerul Uricani
- Jiul Petroșani
- –2020: UTA Arad

Senior career*
Years	Team	Apps	(Gls)
2020–2024	UTA Arad	5	(0)
2020–2021	→ Crișul Chișineu-Criș (loan)		
2021–2022	→ Dacia Unirea Brăila (loan)	15	(0)
2022–2023	→ Metaloglobus București (loan)	8	(0)
2023–2024	→ Jiul Petroșani (loan)	11	(0)
2024–	Jiul Petroșani	0	(0)
- * Club domestic league appearances and goals as of 12:52, 1 November 2024 (UTC)

Alexandru Petrică Pătlăgică (born 28 March 2003) is a Romanian professional footballer who plays as a right back for Jiul Petroșani.

== Club career ==
=== UTA Arad ===
He made his Liga I debut for UTA Arad against Sepsi OSK on 5 February 2022.
