= Lucian Itu =

Romanian footballer and manager

Personal information
- Date of birth: 8 September 1978 (age 48)
- Place of birth: Cugir, Romania
- Height: 1.77 m (5 ft 10 in)
- Positions: Striker; midfielder

Team information
- Current team: Metalurgistul Cugir (player-manager)
- Number: 8

Senior career*
| Years | Team | Apps | (Gls) |
| 2002–2003 | Cugir | 27 | (17) |
| 2003–2005 | Inter Blaj | 52 | (17) |
| 2005–2007 | Minerul Lupeni | 41 | (15) |
| 2007–2010 | Inter Curtea de Argeş | 35 | (9) |
| 2010 | Minerul Lupeni | 4 | (2) |
| 2010–2011 | Săgeata Năvodari | 3 | (0) |
| 2011– | Metalurgistul Cugir | 219 | (35) |

Managerial career
- 2014–2019: Metalurgistul Cugir (assistant)
- 2019–: Metalurgistul Cugir
- * Club domestic league appearances and goals as of 12:27, 25 December 2024 (UTC)

Lucian Itu (born 8 September 1978) is a Romanian footballer and manager who is currently under contract with Metalurgistul Cugir. In his career Itu also played for teams such as Minerul Lupeni or Inter Curtea de Argeș.

== Honours ==
=== Player ===
CSO Cugir

- Liga III: 2020–21
- Liga IV: 2012–13

=== Manager ===
CSO Cugir

- Liga III: 2020–21
