= Răzvan Covaci =

Romanian footballer (born 2003)

Personal information
- Full name: Horațiu Răzvan Covaci
- Date of birth: 10 October 2003 (age 23)
- Place of birth: Luduș, Romania
- Height: 1.69 m (5 ft 7 in)
- Position: Right midfielder

Team information
- Current team: Jiul Petroșanii
- Number: 17

Youth career
- –2022: Gaz Metan Mediaș

Senior career*
Years	Team	Apps	(Gls)
2022	Gaz Metan Mediaș	12	(0)
2022–2023	Argeș Pitești	2	(0)
2023–2024	Mediaș	4	(0)
2024–	Jiul Petroșani	11	(1)
- * Club domestic league appearances and goals as of 12:47, 1 November 2024 (UTC)

Horațiu Răzvan Covaci (born 10 October 2003) is a Romanian professional footballer who plays as a right midfielder for Liga III club Jiul Petroșani.
