= Lucian Burchel =

Romanian footballer and manager

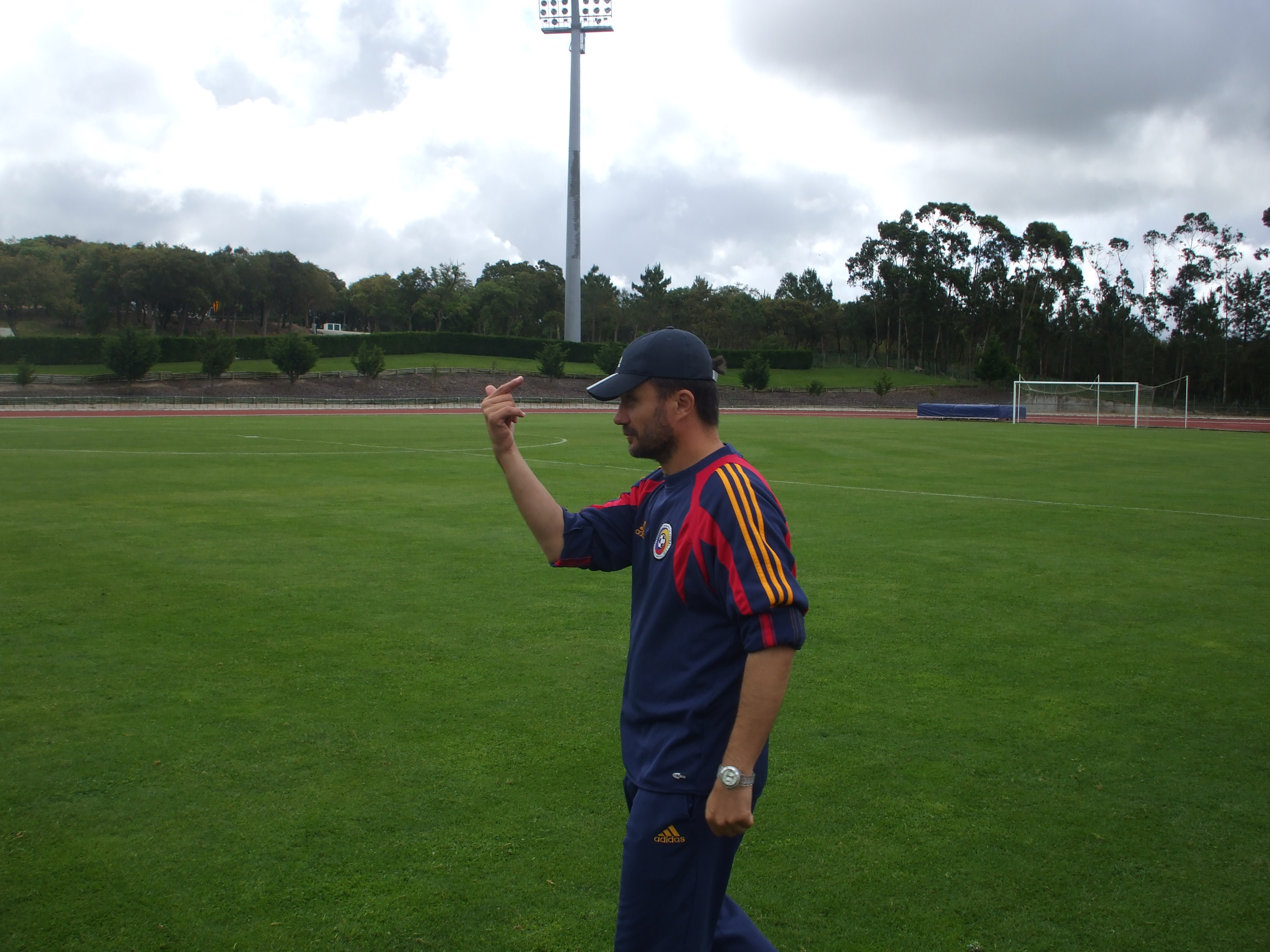

Personal information
- Full name: Lucian Ovidiu Burchel
- Date of birth: 20 March 1964 (age 62)
- Place of birth: Lupeni, Romania
- Height: 1.81 m (5 ft 11 in)
- Position: Forward

Youth career
- Minerul Lupeni
- 1981–1982: → Luceafărul București (loan)

Senior career*
Years	Team	Apps	(Gls)
1980–1982	Minerul Lupeni		
1983–1989	Sportul Studențesc București	64	(3)
1989–1992	Inter Sibiu	88	(23)
1993	Nyíregyháza	13	(1)
1993–1994	Monthey		
1994	Yverdon-Sport		
1995	Sportul Studențesc București	8	(0)
1995–1996	Minaur Zlatna	8	(1)
Total		274	(28)

International career
1986	Romania	2	(0)

Managerial career
- 2006: FC Sibiu
- 2007–2011: Romania U15 / U19
- * Club domestic league appearances and goals

Lucian Ovidiu Burchel (born 20 March 1964) is a Romanian former footballer and manager.

== International career ==
Lucian Burchel played two friendly games at international level for Romania against Iraq.

== Honours ==
Minerul Lupeni

- Divizia C: 1982–83

Inter Sibiu

- Balkans Cup: 1990–91
