= ACS Minerul Lupeni =

Romanian football club

Minerul Lupeni
- Full name: Asociația Club Sportiv; Minerul Lupeni
- Nicknames: Minerii (The Miners); Roș-negrii (The Red-Blacks); Lupii roșii (The Red Wolves); Lupii din Lupeni (The Wolves from Lupeni)
- Founded: 1920; 106 years ago as Jiul Lupeni; 2021; 5 years ago as Viitorul Minerul Lupeni
- Ground: Minerul
- Capacity: 5,000
- Owners: Lupeni Municipality; Emil Părău
- Chairman: Florin Spînu
- Manager: Ionuț Moșteanu
- League: Liga III
- 2025–26: Liga III, Series VI; Regular season: 2nd of 12; Play-off, Series III: 2nd of 8
- Website: minerullupeni.com
Home colours	Away colours

Clubul Sportiv Minerul Lupeni, commonly referred to as Minerul Lupeni, is a Romanian football club based in Lupeni, Hunedoara County, which competes in Liga III, the third tier of the Romanian football league system. Established in 1920 as Jiul Lupeni, the club changed its name several times to Partizanul (1950), Flacăra (1951), Minerul (1953 and 1957) and Energia (1956). Dissolved in 2010, the club from Jiu Valley was re-founded as Viitorul Minerul Lupeni in 2021.

== History ==
Chart of yearly table positions of Minerul Lupeni in the national leagues.

The team representing the miners of the Lupeni coal basin was founded in 1920 as Jiul Lupeni. In 1926, the club briefly merged with CAMP, continuing to compete under the name Jiul Lupeni.

In the 1927–28 season, the Jiu Valley side won the Arad Regional Championship and qualified for the national tournament of Divizia A. After eliminating România Cluj 2–0 and Șoimii Sibiu 3–0, Jiul reached the final, where it lost 2–3 to Colțea Brașov. The lineup in the final, coached by Adalbert Szabo, featured Ioan Kiss – Eugen Szabados, Rupp – Alexandru Berkessy, Szülle, Gentl – Kertesz, Aurel Guga, Bognar, Joseph Kilianovitz and Meszner.

Renamed Minerul, the team made its first appearance in the Cupa României during the 1935–36 season, reaching the quarter-finals before being eliminated 2–9 by Ripensia Timișoara, the eventual winners. The Miners also competed in the inaugural season of Divizia C, finishing as runners-up in the Western League, before earning promotion to Divizia B at the end of the 1937–38 Divizia C season. That squad featured Sepreny – Sebok, Baki – Maior, Iuliu Peter, Racolțea – Comsloșan, Ilieș, Zelenak, Sorger and Băcilă.

The Red-Blacks spent the next three seasons in the second division, finishing 4th in 1938–39, 2nd in 1939–40 and 6th in 1940–41. After the Second World War, Minerul resumed competition in Divizia B, finishing the 1946–47 season in 12th place in Series II.

During the following decade, the Miners remained in the second division, often finishing in mid-table or fighting to avoid relegation. They finished 6th in 1947–48, 5th in 1948–49, 4th in 1950 under the name Partizanul and 11th in 1951 as Flacăra. That year, the team avoided relegation following the relocation of Flacăra București to Ploiești and the subsequent dissolution of the former Flacăra Ploiești. Minerul then finished 10th in 1952, 14th in 1953—when the club reverted to the Minerul name—6th in 1954, 9th in both 1955, under coach Alexandru Mike, and 1956, and 6th in the 1957–58 campaign.

At the end of the 1958–59 season, Minerul won Series I of Divizia B and achieved promotion to Divizia A after fifteen seasons in the second division. The squad, managed by head coach Vasile Lazăr and assistant coach Adalbert Pall, included Ioan Kiss II, Simion Plev, Alexandru Coman, Vasile Keresteș, Ștefan Szöke, Ioan Groza, Carol Mihaly, Constantin Cotroază, I. Pall, Mircea Onea, Tudor Paraschiva, Carol Creiniceanu, among others.

With several new players, including Teodor Mihalache, Daniel Peretz, Ion Leahovici, Alexandru Dan II, Milea, Alexandru Nisipeanu, Virgil Mihăilă, M. Țurcan, D. Cucu and N. Stanciu, Minerul spent four seasons in the top flight, finishing three consecutive campaigns in 11th place before being relegated after finishing last in the 1962–63 season. In the 1959–60 Cupa României, the Red-Blacks reached the quarter-finals of the Cupa României, losing 1–3 to Dinamo Obor București.

Minerul Lupeni then spent four more seasons in the second tier, finishing 10th in 1963–64 with Ilie Cricitoiu in charge, 4th in 1964–65, 11th in 1965–66 and 13th in 1966–67 under Alexandru Florea, unexpectedly suffering relegation to Divizia C.

The Miners went on to spend nine consecutive seasons in the third tier before returning to Divizia B. During this period, the team finished 5th in 1967–68, runners-up in 1968–69, and 3rd in the 1969–70, 1970–71 and 1971–72 seasons. In 1972–73, under the guidance of coach Teodor Mihalache, Minerul finished 7th and qualified for the first round proper of the Cupa României, where the team was narrowly eliminated 0–1 by Steaua București. The lineup featured Șarpe, I. Rus, Șvedak, Burdangiu, Serafim, Polgar, Cristache II, Gh. Voicu, Lucuța, Cotroază and Turbatu (83' Moldovan).

In 1973–74, Minerul finished as runners-up once again, followed by a 3rd-place finish in 1974–75 under Gheorghe Teodorescu, before finally winning Series VII in the 1975–76 season and securing promotion. Under the leadership of Gheorghe Kotormány, the promotion-winning squad featured Budușan, Dodu, Roșu, Tudor, Naidin, Boloș, Dosan, Lucuță, Rusu, Nicșa, Stoinică, Lucian, Gh. Voicu and Burdangiu.

Back in Divizia B, the team competed in Series III, finishing 13th in the 1976–77 season with Petre Libardi on the bench, before suffering relegation at the end of the following campaign after placing 15th in 1977–78, with Libardi replaced by Gheorghe Kotormány after the first half of the season.

Two seasons followed in Series VII of Divizia C, with the team finishing as runners-up in 1978–79 and earning promotion at the end of the 1979–80 campaign by winning the series. The squad, led by Mihai Basarab and assistant coach Constantin Cotroază, included Homan, Grigore, Leordean, Truică, Burdangiu, Dumitru, I. Popa, Boloș, I. Marian, Dosan, P. Popa, Moraru, Voicu, Leca, Covaci, Iacob, Tudor, Sămăreanu, Burchel and Bălosu.

Two more seasons followed in Series III of Divizia B, where Minerul finished 10th in the 1980–81 season and 16th in 1981–82, resulting in another relegation to the third tier.

Minerul earned another promotion at the end of the 1982–83 season, winning Series IX of Divizia C with Petre Libardi on the bench. The squad included Lixandru, Teleche, Rusu, Sebestyen, I. Popa, Truică, Mușat, Voicu, Sălăjean, P. Popa, Nichimiș, Cean, Colceag, Chitac, Dordea, Grigore, Pantilimon, Ene, Henzel, Morar, Vînătoru, Dina and Căldărar.

In their first season back in the second tier, the Jiu Valley side, competing in Series III under the guidance of Petre Libardi, secured an 8th-place mid-table finish, followed by a 9th-place finish in the 1984–85 campaign. However, the 1985–86 season marked a clear decline, as a series of poor results during the first half of the championship led to Petre Libardi being replaced by Gheorghe Tătaru. The managerial change failed to improve the results, and Minerul Lupeni finished the season in last place, resulting in relegation back to Divizia C.

In the 2004–05 season, Minerul Lupeni won Series VII of Divizia C and returned to Divizia B after nineteen years of absence. The squad, coached by Iosif Rus, included Ardelean, Botezatu, Dobra, Lumperdean, Câmpean, Drăghici, Pilea, Acs, Cr. Barbu, Amaximoaie, Cișmariu, Damian, I. Radu, Baroană, M. Szoradi, Daj, Toader, Noață, Diaconescu, Elisei, Tr. Barbu, Ciorea and V. Stancu.

In the 2005–06 season, following a reorganisation of the league system, no fewer than six teams were to be relegated from each of the three series. Minerul started well with Adrian Matei on the bench, but the second half of the season began with Gabriel Stan, who lasted only five rounds. He was followed by Iosif Rus, and after three more matches, Dan Mănăilă took over from round 23. Lupeni secured safety on the final matchday, finishing 10th. Standout players that season included Urai, Luca, Boroncoi, V. Stancu, Itu, Mihovici, Török and Bălău.

The Red-Blacks continued to compete in Series II of the second division, finishing 5th in the 2006–07 season under Dan Mănăilă and 12th in 2007–08 with Marin Tudorache in charge.

Tudorache was dismissed in September 2008 following a home defeat against Jiul Petroșani and was replaced on an interim basis by Ion Dumitra and assistant coach Iosif Rus. During their interim spell, Minerul's cup run ended in the Round of 32 of the 2008–09 Cupa României with a 0–4 defeat against Unirea Urziceni. As neither Dumitra nor Rus held the required coaching licences, Carol Creiniceanu was appointed official head coach at the beginning of November 2008. However, after undergoing surgery in December, Creiniceanu was unable to continue leading the team. Dumitra and Rus subsequently resumed control and led Minerul until the end of the season, finishing 8th in the 2008–09 campaign. The squad comprised, among others, Bănică, G. Ciucă, Murdărea, Dragomir, Irina, Pocian, C. Bar, Dumitra, Militaru, Daj, Nicorec, M. Roman, Iambor, Apostol, Bozian, Ișfan, Chițu and Vlăduți.

In the 2009–10 season, Minerul finished 12th, and during the 2010–11 season withdrew from the competition and effectively ceased activity.

=== Revival and return to the national leagues (2021–present) ===
In the autumn of 2021, former club captain Adrian Lumperdean, together with his brother Emil Lumperdean and their nephew Lucu Lumperdean, revived the football tradition in Lupeni by founding Viitorul Minerul Lupeni, with support from the local authorities and financial backing from local businessman Emil Părău. The initiative was part of a broader effort to consolidate football activity in the Jiu Valley, initially focusing on youth and junior development before the formation of a senior squad.

The senior team entered the 2022–23 season of Liga IV Hunedoara. Coached by Dan Voicu, the team finished 1st in the regular season and 2nd in the Final Four play-off. In the following campaign, the club adopted the name Minerul Lupeni and finished 2nd in the regular season before winning the county title through the Final Four play-off, thus qualifying for the promotion play-off to Liga III. Minerul drew 0–0 away against Viitorul Arad in the first leg, but lost the return 0–3 at home. The squad included Raț, Tonca, Mazilu, Ciocîrlan, Matei, Arcuși, Prem, Bănceanu, Creciunesc, Iepure, Belei, Șilip, Harangozo, Băcăran, Mândreci, Sllio, Roșian, Maria, Glăvan and S. Popescu.

Despite losing the promotion play-off, Minerul Lupeni was later admitted to Liga III following the withdrawal of several clubs. The 2024–25 season began with Dan Voicu as technical director and Aurel Moldovan as head coach. The team competed in Series IX, finishing 2nd in the regular season and 1st in the series play-off, securing qualification for the promotion play-offs. Minerul was eliminated in the first round by Olimpia Satu Mare after a 2–2 away draw and a 0–4 home defeat.

The 2025–26 season began with the same technical staff. However, following a poor run of results, the club underwent several coaching changes. Dan Voicu resigned after six rounds and, following a brief one-match interim spell under Aurel Moldovan, Gabriel Toma was appointed head coach. He led the team until the end of the regular season, which Minerul finished 2nd in Series VI. Ionuț Moșteanu then took over as head coach for the play-off round, guiding the Miners to a 2nd-place finish in Series III and qualification for the promotion play-offs, where they were eliminated in the first round following a 0–3 defeat against Unirea Alba Iulia at Minerul Stadium. The squad comprised, among others, Drîngă, Tonca, Chițimia, Dulap, Stana, N. Toma, Dr. Vlad, Vl. Popa, Mar, Raicea, Al. Moise, Bedea, Petea, Eshun, Trip, Sima, Pancu, Creciunesc, Baiddo and Voinea.

Chronology of names
Period	Name
1920–1936	Jiul Lupeni
1936–1950	Minerul Lupeni
1950–1951	Partizanul Lupeni
1951–1953	Flacăra Lupeni
1953–2011	Minerul Lupeni
2011–2021	Inactive
2021–2024	Viitorul Minerul Lupeni
2024–present	Minerul Lupeni

== Honours ==
Liga I

- Runners-up (1): 1927–28

Liga II

- Winners (1): 1958–59
- Runners-up (1): 1939–40

Liga III

- Winners (5): 1937–38, 1975–76, 1979–80, 1982–83, 2004–05
- Runners-up (6): 1936–37, 1968–69, 1973–74, 1978–79, 1991–92, 2025–26

Liga IV – Hunedoara County

- Winners (1): 2023–24
- Runners-up (1): 2022–23

== Players ==
=== First team squad ===
As of 10 September 2024

Note: Flags indicate national team as defined under FIFA eligibility rules; some limited exceptions apply. Players may hold more than one non-FIFA nationality.

No.	Pos.	Nation	Player
1	GK	ROU	Andrei Rațiu (Captain)
4	DF	ROU	Alexandru Doboș
6	DF	ROU	Dragoș Vlad
7	MF	ROU	Laurențiu Mazilu
8	MF	ROU	Mihai Bănceanu
9	FW	GHA	Abraham Ayemantey
10	MF	ROU	Dacian Mândreci
11	MF	ROU	Ștefan Tanți
12	GK	ROU	Silviu Drîngă
14	DF	ROU	Raul Ciucurescu
15	DF	ROU	David Androne
17	FW	GHA	Robert Eshun
18	MF	ROU	Sergiu Prem

No.	Pos.	Nation	Player
19	MF	ROU	Andrei Petea
20	MF	ROU	Adrian Marinca
21	MF	GHA	Moses Baidoo
22	DF	ROU	Răzvan Dulap
23	FW	ROU	Bogdan Jeler
27	MF	ROU	Alexandru Cercel
55	MF	ROU	Alexandru Creciunesc
77	DF	ROU	Nicolae Toma
80	MF	ROU	Adrian Bedea
88	GK	ROU	Andrei Tonca
97	DF	ROU	Alexandru Hârsan
99	FW	ROU	Bogdan Iepure

=== Out of loan ===
Note: Flags indicate national team as defined under FIFA eligibility rules; some limited exceptions apply. Players may hold more than one non-FIFA nationality.

No. / Pos. / Nation / Player	No. / Pos. / Nation / Player

== Club officials ==
=== Board of directors ===
Role	Name
Owners	(Romania) Lupeni Municipality (Romania) Emil Părău
President	(Romania) Florin Spînu
Sporting director	(Romania) Gabriel Toma

=== Current technical staff ===
Role	Name
Manager	(Romania) Ionuț Moșteanu
Goalkeeping coach	(Romania) Andrei Tonca
Fitness coach	(Romania) Cosmin Frimu
Masseur	(Romania) Iosif Kiraly

== Notable players ==
The footballers mentioned below have played at least 1 season for Minerul Lupeni and also played in Liga I for another team.

- (Romania) Ștefan Onisie
- (Romania) Cristian Bălgrădean
- (Romania) Mircea Popa
- (Romania) Lucian Burchel
- (Romania) Cornel Irina
- (Romania) Horațiu Lasconi
- (Romania) Tudor Paraschiva
- (Romania) Carol Creiniceanu
- (Romania) Aurel Guga
- (Romania) Ioan Kiss
- (Romania) Andrei Stocker
- (Romania) Aurel Moise
- (Romania) Sándor Schwartz
- (Romania) Tiberiu Csik
- (Romania) Ovidiu Vezan

== Former managers ==
- (Romania) Ion Bălănescu (1960–1961)
- (Romania) Alexandru Marky (1961–1962)
- (Romania) Teodor Mihalache (1972–1973)
- (Romania) Petre Libardi (1976–1977)
- (Romania) Adrian Matei (2004–2006)
- (Romania) Gabriel Stan (2005–2006)
- (Romania) Dan Mănăilă (2006–2007)
- (Romania) Marin Tudorache (2007–2008)
- (Romania) Ion Dumitra (2008)
- (Romania) Petre Gigiu (2009–2010)
- (Romania) Ionel Augustin (2010)
- (Romania) Dan Voicu (2022–2024)
- (Romania) Aurel Moldovan (2024–2025)
- (Romania) Gabriel Toma (2025–2026)
- (Romania) Ionuț Moșteanu (2026–present)
- (Romania) Vasile Lazăr
- (Romania) Gheorghe Kotormány
- (Romania) Gogu Tonca

== League and cup history ==
Season	Tier	League	Place	Notes	Cupa României
2026–27	3	Liga III	TBD		TBD
2025–26	3	Liga III (Series VI)	2nd (play-off)		Second round
2024–25	3	Liga III (Series IX)	1st (C)		First round
2023–24	4	Liga IV (HD)	1st (C)	Promoted	
2022–23	4	Liga IV (HD)	2nd		
2011–22	Not active				
2010–11	2	Liga II (Series II)	16th	Withdrew	
2009–10	2	Liga II (Series II)	12th		
2008–09	2	Liga II (Series II)	8th		Round of 32
2007–08	2	Liga II (Series II)	12th		
2006–07	2	Liga II (Series II)	5th		
2005–06	2	Divizia B (Series III)	10th		
2004–05	3	Divizia C (Series VII)	1st (C)	Promoted	
2003–04	3	Divizia C (Series VII)	3rd		
2002–03	3	Divizia C (Series V)	11th		
2001–02	3	Divizia C (Series VI)	4th		
2000–01	3	Divizia C (Series VI)	7th		
1999–00	3	Divizia C (Series IV)	4th		
1998–99	3	Divizia C (Series III)	8th		
1997–98	3	Divizia C (Series III)	13th		
1996–97	3	Divizia C (Series III)	12th		
1995–96	3	Divizia C (Series III)	14th		
1994–95	3	Divizia C (Series IV)	9th		
1993–94	3	Divizia C (Series III)	5th		
1992–93	3	Divizia C (Series III)	13th		
1991–92	3	Divizia C (Series IX)	2nd		
1990–91	3	Divizia C (Series XI)	5th		
1989–90	3	Divizia C (Series IX)	3rd		
1988–89	3	Divizia C (Series IX)	4th		
1987–88	3	Divizia C (Series X)	10th		
1986–87	3	Divizia C (Series VIII)	6th		
1985–86	2	Divizia B (Series III)	18th	Relegated	
1984–85	2	Divizia B (Series III)	9th		
1983–84	2	Divizia B (Series III)	8th		
1982–83	3	Divizia C (Series IX)	1st (C)	Promoted	
1981–82	2	Divizia B (Series III)	16th	Relegated	
1980–81	2	Divizia B (Series III)	10th		
1979–80	3	Divizia C (Series VII)	1st (C)	Promoted	
1978–79	3	Divizia C (Series VII)	2nd		

Season	Tier	League	Place	Notes	Cupa României
1977–78	2	Divizia B (Series III)	15th	Relegated	
1976–77	2	Divizia B (Series III)	13th		
1975–76	3	Divizia C (Series VII)	1st (C)	Promoted	
1974–75	3	Divizia C (Series VII)	3rd		
1973–74	3	Divizia C (Series VII)	2nd		
1972–73	3	Divizia C (Series VIII)	7th		Round of 32
1971–72	3	Divizia C (Series VII)	3rd		
1970–71	3	Divizia C (Series V)	3rd		
1969–70	3	Divizia C (Series V)	3rd		
1968–69	3	Divizia C (Series V)	2nd		
1967–68	3	Divizia C (West Series)	5th		
1966–67	2	Divizia B (Series II)	13th	Relegated	Round of 16
1965–66	2	Divizia B (Series II)	11th		
1964–65	2	Divizia B (Series II)	4th		Round of 16
1963–64	2	Divizia B (Series II)	10th		
1962–63	1	Divizia A	15th	Relegated	Round of 32
1961–62	1	Divizia A	11th		Round of 32
1960–61	1	Divizia A	11th		Round of 32
1959–60	1	Divizia A	11th		Quarter-finals
1958–59	2	Divizia B (Series I)	1st (C)	Promoted	
1957–58	2	Divizia B (Series I)	6th		Round of 16
1956	2	Divizia B (Series I)	9th		
1955	2	Divizia B (Series II)	9th		
1954	2	Divizia B (Series II)	6th		
1953	2	Divizia B (Series II)	14th		
1952	2	Divizia B (Serie II)	10th		
1951	2	Divizia B (Series II)	11th		
1950	2	Divizia B (Series II)	4th		
1948–49	2	Divizia B (Series II)	5th		
1947–48	2	Divizia B (Series III)	6th		
1946–47	2	Divizia B (Series III)	12th		
1942–43	-	-			Round of 32
1941–42	-	-			Round of 16
1940–41	2	Divizia B (Series II)	6th		
1939–40	2	Divizia B (Series II)	2nd		
1938–39	2	Divizia B (South–West)	4th		Round of 32
1937–38	3	Divizia C (West League II)	1st (C)	Promoted	
1936–37	3	Divizia C (West League)	2nd		
1935–36	-	-			Quarter-finals
1927–28	1	Divizia A	2nd		
