= Ioan Kiss =

Romanian footballer

Personal information
- Date of birth: 8 April 1901
- Date of death: 19 November 2006 (aged 105)
- Position: Goalkeeper

Senior career*
Years	Team	Apps	(Gls)
1917–1926	Olimpia Arad		
1926–1927	Colțea Brașov		
1927–1931	Jiul Lupeni		
1931–1933	Olimpia Arad		

International career
1926–1928	Romania	4	(0)
- * Club domestic league appearances and goals

Ioan Kiss (8 April 1901 – 19 November 2006) was a Romanian footballer who played as a goalkeeper. He lived to 105 years of age, and in a list of centenarian sportspeople, he is the oldest worldwide to have been an international-level footballer (as of October 2025 – the list is not necessarily definitive).

== International career ==
Ioan Kiss played four friendly matches for Romania, making his debut on 25 April 1926 under coach Teofil Morariu in a 6–1 victory against Bulgaria.

Scores and results table. Romania's goal tally first:

International appearances
App	Date	Venue	Opponent	Result	Competition
1.	25 April 1926	Bucharest, Romania	Bulgaria	6–1	Friendly
2.	19 June 1927	Bucharest, Romania	Poland	3–3	Friendly
3.	15 April 1928	Arad, Romania	Turkey	4–2	Friendly
4.	6 May 1928	Belgrade, Yugoslavia	Yugoslavia	1–3	King Alexander's Cup 1928
