= Marin Tudorache =

Romanian footballer

Personal information
- Date of birth: 1 April 1968 (age 58)
- Place of birth: Petroșani, Romania
- Height: 1.85 m (6 ft 1 in)
- Position: Midfielder

Youth career
- 1976–1988: Jiul Petroșani

Senior career*
Years	Team	Apps	(Gls)
1988–1989	Jiul Petroșani		
1990–1991	Minerul Lupeni		
1991–1992	Rapid București	11	(1)
1994–1998	Jiul Petroșani	70	(6)
Total		81+	(7+)

Managerial career
- 1999: Jiul Petroșani
- 2001: Jiul Petroșani
- 2004–2005: Jiul Petroșani (assistant)
- 2005: Jiul Petroșani
- 2006–2007: Jiul Petroșani
- 2007: Minerul Motru
- 2007–2008: Minerul Lupeni
- 2009–2010: Arieșul Turda
- 2011–2012: Jiul Petroșani
- 2013–2015: Jiul Petroșani
- 2018: Energeticianul
- * Club domestic league appearances and goals as of 25 April 2020

Marin Tudorache (born 1 April 1968) is a Romanian former footballer who played as a midfielder mainly for Jiul Petroșani, but also for teams such as Minerul Lupeni or Rapid București. Born in Petroșani, Tudorache spent almost all his career as a player at Jiul, but he was needed to retire at 30 years due to medical problems. After retirement he was dedicated as a manager for the same club. Tudorache was the manager of Jiul at all the levels, from Liga I to Liga IV and youth level. A part of Jiul, Tudorache managed Minerul Motru, Minerul Lupeni, Arieșul Turda and Energeticianul at the level of the second tier.

His son, Vlad Tudorache, is also a footballer.

== Honours ==
=== Player ===
Jiul Petroșani

- Divizia B: Winner (2) 1988–89, 1995–96
