= Petroșani =

- Municipality
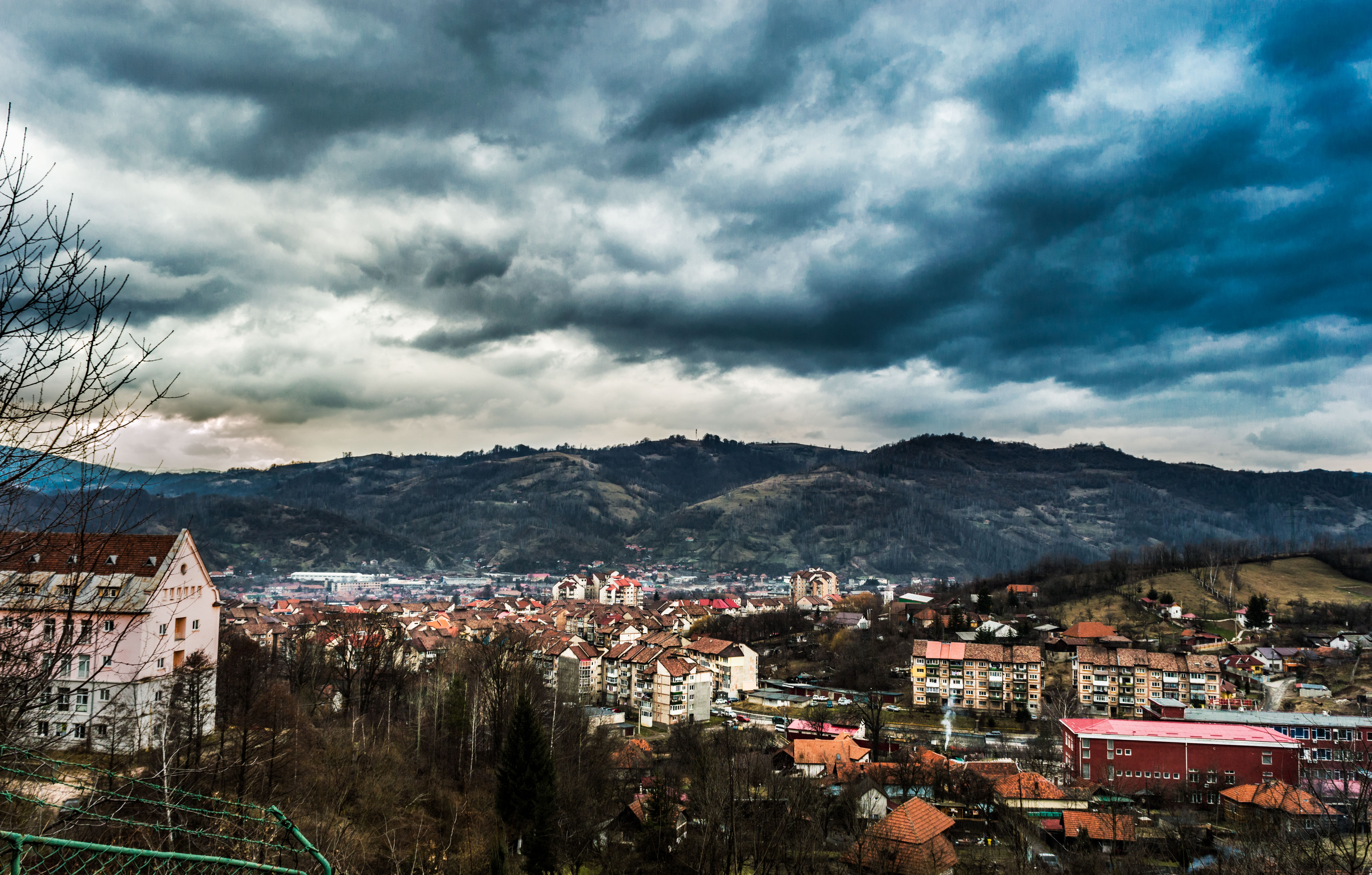
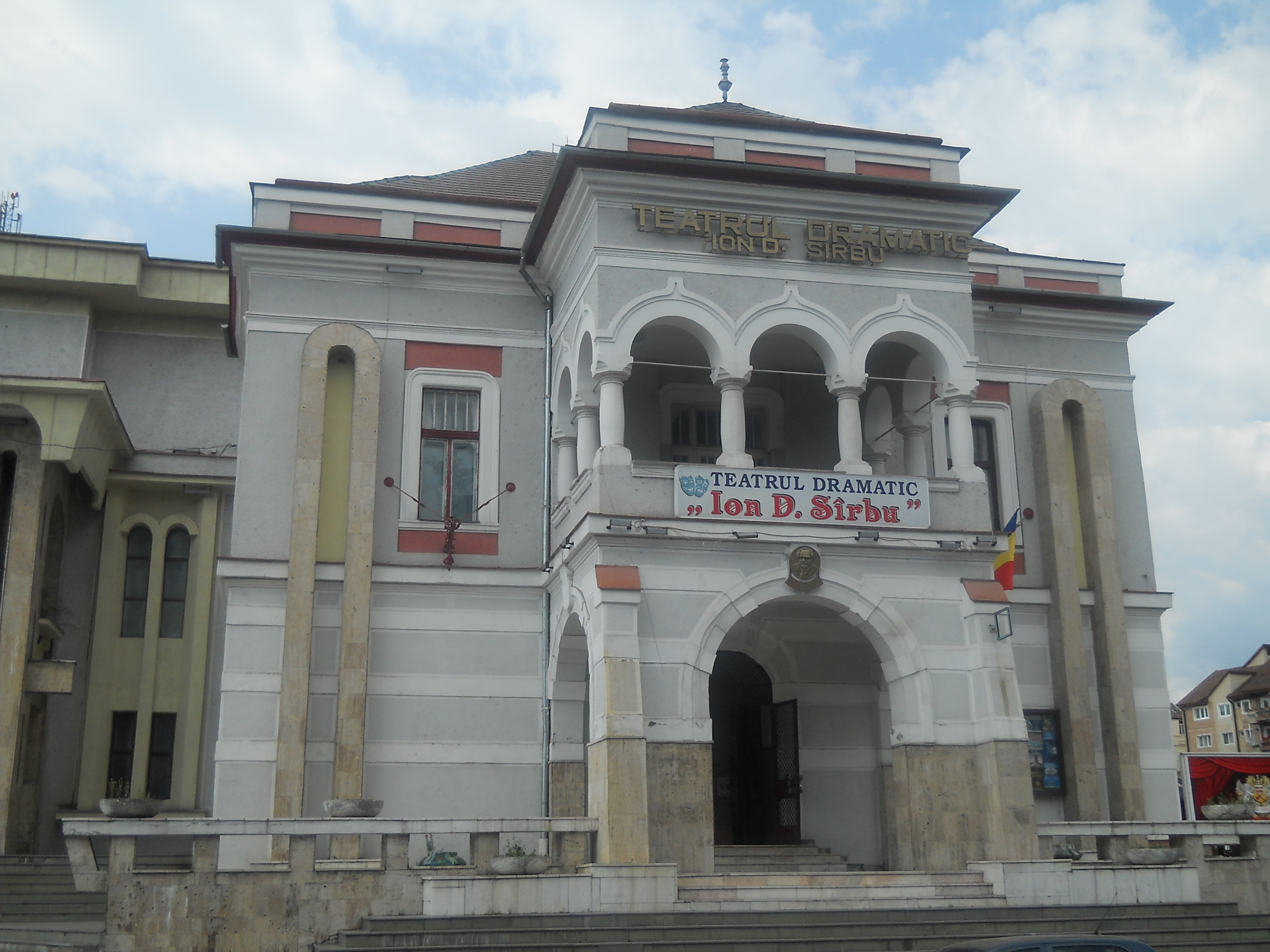
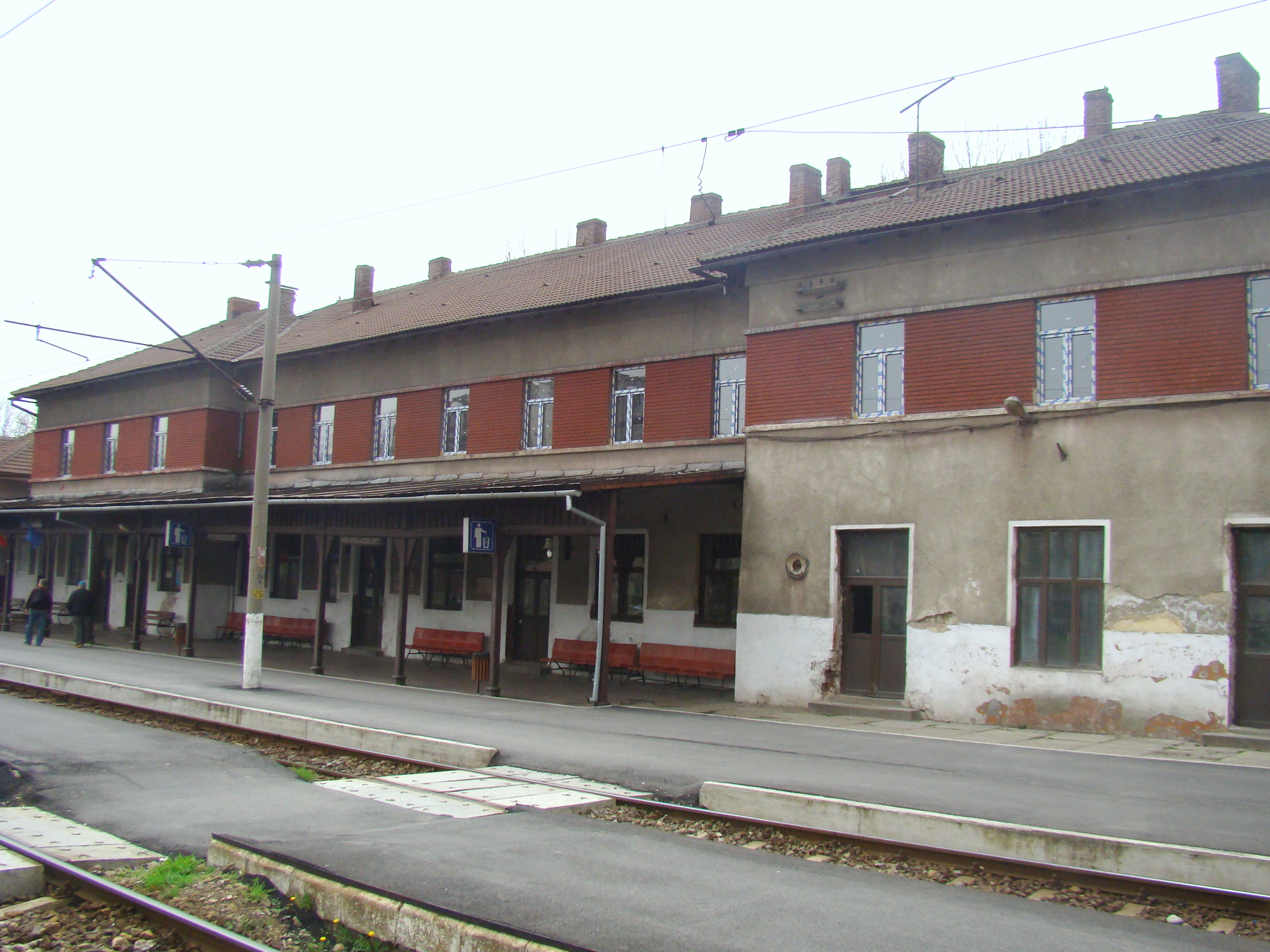
- View of the city I. D. Sîrbu Theater Railway station

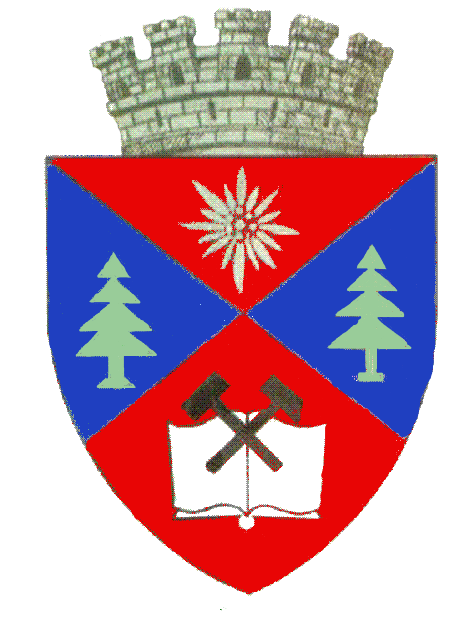
- Coat of arms

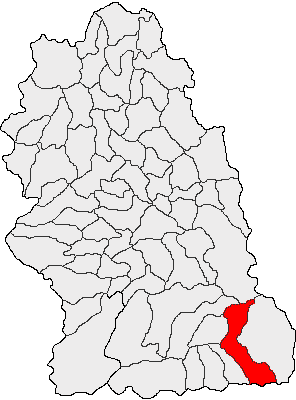
- Location in Hunedoara County

- Location in Romania
- Coordinates: 45°24′44″N 23°22′24″E
- Country: Romania
- County: Hunedoara

Government
  - Mayor (2024–2028): Tiberiu Iacob-Ridzi (PSD)
- Area: 195.56 km^{2} (75.51 sq mi)
- Elevation: 431 m (1,414 ft)
- Population (2021-12-01): 31,044
  - Density: 158.74/km^{2} (411.15/sq mi)
- Time zone: UTC+02:00 (EET)
  - Summer (DST): UTC+03:00 (EEST)
- Postal code: 330001
- Area code: (+40) 02 54
- Vehicle reg.: HD
- Website: www.petrosani.ro

Petroșani (Romanian pronunciation: [petroˈʃanʲ]; Hungarian: Petrozsény; German: Petroschen) is a city in Hunedoara County, Transylvania, Romania, with a population of 31,044 as of 2021. The city has been associated with mining since the 19th century.

== History ==
"Pietros" means "stony, rocky" in Romanian. The city of Petroșani was founded in the 17th century (around 1640) with the name Petrozsény. In 1720, an Austrian cartographer mentions that the entire Jiu Valley was intensely populated and settlements could be seen from one end to the other.

At the 1818 census, Petroșani had 233 inhabitants, while the entire Valley counted 2,550. During this time, the main activity of the people was shepherding and no urban settlement had appeared yet. Around 1840, coal surface mining began in Petroșani, Vulcan, and Petrila.

After Romania joined the Allies of World War I in 1916, Romanian troops attacked the town during the Battle of Transylvania. A battalion of miners defended Petroșani in a last stand battle, refusing to give up the town. The Romanian occupation, however, did not last long: the united Austro-Hungarian and German troops regained control of the town shortly, in which guerrilla warfare, led by the local Viktor Maderspach, played an important role.

After the collapse of Austria-Hungary at the end of World War I, and the declaration of the Union of Transylvania with Romania, the Romanian Army took control of Petroșani in December 1918, during the Hungarian–Romanian War. The town officially became part of the territory ceded to the Kingdom of Romania in June 1920 under the terms of the Treaty of Trianon. During the interwar period, the city was the headquarters of plasa Petroșani, within Hunedoara County. After 1950, the city became the headquarters of Petroșani raion within Hunedoara Region. Following the administrative reform of 1968, Petroșani became once more part of Hunedoara County.

The population experienced massive growth only in the 20th century during the communist government, as many workers were brought in from other parts of the country.

As other cities from the Jiu Valley, throughout the second half of the 19th century and most of the 20th century, most activities in the city revolved around the mines. But after the fall of the communist regime, many mines were closed, and the city, just like the whole valley, was forced to diversify the economy. This has also led to a significant population decline: Petroșani is one of the Romanian cities which has experienced the fastest population loss from the 1990s onwards.

== Geography ==
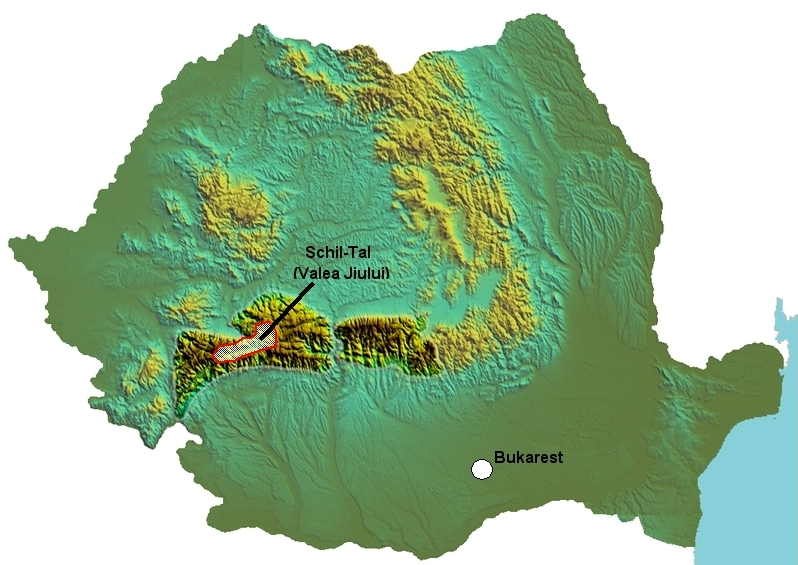
Jiu Valley on the map of Romania. Petroșani is the largest city of the valley, a traditionally mining area

Petroșani is located in the Jiu Valley, which is the entrance to the Retezat National Park and provides access to the Vâlcan, Parâng, and Retezat mountains. The city administers four villages: Dâlja Mare (Nagydilzsa), Dâlja Mică (Kisdilzsa), Peștera (Zsupinyászuvölgy) and Slătinioara (Szlatinova községrész).

=== Climate ===
Climate data for Petroșani (elevation 607m, 2014–2026 normals, extremes 1939–present)
| Month | Jan | Feb | Mar | Apr | May | Jun | Jul | Aug | Sep | Oct | Nov | Dec | Year |
|---|---|---|---|---|---|---|---|---|---|---|---|---|---|
| Record high °C (°F) | 17.9 (64.2) | 20.1 (68.2) | 25.0 (77.0) | 27.8 (82.0) | 30.1 (86.2) | 33.8 (92.8) | 36.4 (97.5) | 36.4 (97.5) | 35.3 (95.5) | 28.2 (82.8) | 24.7 (76.5) | 16.0 (60.8) | 36.4 (97.5) |
| Mean daily maximum °C (°F) | 4.0 (39.2) | 7.0 (44.6) | 11.1 (52.0) | 15.7 (60.3) | 19.7 (67.5) | 25.1 (77.2) | 26.8 (80.2) | 27.2 (81.0) | 22.1 (71.8) | 16.3 (61.3) | 10.3 (50.5) | 5.4 (41.7) | 15.9 (60.6) |
| Daily mean °C (°F) | −0.6 (30.9) | 2.1 (35.8) | 5.3 (41.5) | 9.3 (48.7) | 13.7 (56.7) | 18.4 (65.1) | 19.8 (67.6) | 19.8 (67.6) | 15.7 (60.3) | 10.2 (50.4) | 5.7 (42.3) | 1.6 (34.9) | 10.1 (50.2) |
| Mean daily minimum °C (°F) | −5.2 (22.6) | −2.7 (27.1) | −0.4 (31.3) | 2.8 (37.0) | 7.6 (45.7) | 11.8 (53.2) | 12.8 (55.0) | 12.5 (54.5) | 9.3 (48.7) | 4.1 (39.4) | 1.1 (34.0) | −2.3 (27.9) | 4.3 (39.7) |
| Record low °C (°F) | −29.9 (−21.8) | −24.8 (−12.6) | −22.5 (−8.5) | −10.0 (14.0) | −3.4 (25.9) | −3.4 (25.9) | 4.4 (39.9) | 2.4 (36.3) | −3.6 (25.5) | −10.0 (14.0) | −18.0 (−0.4) | −28.6 (−19.5) | −29.9 (−21.8) |
| Average precipitation mm (inches) | 60.7 (2.39) | 42.4 (1.67) | 44.1 (1.74) | 55.2 (2.17) | 99.7 (3.93) | 110.1 (4.33) | 98.5 (3.88) | 72.9 (2.87) | 65.8 (2.59) | 48.4 (1.91) | 57.4 (2.26) | 50.1 (1.97) | 805.3 (31.71) |
| Average precipitation days (≥ 1.0 mm) | 10.1 | 6.6 | 7.9 | 8.8 | 12.6 | 11.4 | 9.5 | 7.4 | 8.3 | 6.2 | 8.9 | 8.5 | 106.2 |
| Average snowy days | 12.0 | 7.2 | 4.0 | 1.9 | 0 | 0 | 0 | 0 | 0 | 0 | 3.5 | 9.5 | 38.1 |
Source: Meteomanz (2014-2026), Infoclimat (1980-2010), ANM, mmediu.gov.ro

== Landmarks ==
- Sfinții Arhangeli Church ("Holy Archangels Church"), built in the 18th century.
- The "Ion G. Duca" school, built in 1935
- The Hungarian school, built in 1873 by Germans and inhabited by a group of 50 Catholic nuns from a monastery near Munich
- The Old Theater, built in 1886
- The Lutheran Church, built between 1892 and 1896
- The Mining Museum, built in 1920
- The current Sports School building, built in 1919
- The "I. D. Sîrbu" Theater Hall, built in 1905
- The Justice Court building, built in 1910
- The current Students theater, built in 1922
- The Unitarian Church, built between 1924 and 1928
- The University of Petroșani, built in 1948
- The Jiul Shopping Center, re-opened in December 2007 after renovation, initially built in the early 1980s

== Social events ==
The following social events take place in Petroșani:

- the Dramatic Theater offers a wide variety of performance every week
- the annual international folklore festival
- the Folk Music Festival Cântecul Adâncului... ("Song of the Deep")
- artistic summer camps organized by the Petroșani University
- art, numismatic and caricatures exhibitions
- piano and violin recitals, offered by the Music School
- the Petroșani Day festival, usually organized in autumn
- the annual Underground Valley Graffiti Fest

== Demographics ==
Historical population
| Year | Pop. | ±% |
|---|---|---|
| 1850 | 581 | — |
| 1880 | 2,096 | +260.8% |
| 1900 | 7,765 | +270.5% |
| 1910 | 12,193 | +57.0% |
| 1930 | 15,405 | +26.3% |
| 1948 | 14,138 | −8.2% |
| 1956 | 23,052 | +63.0% |
| 1966 | 35,187 | +52.6% |
| 1977 | 40,664 | +15.6% |
| 1992 | 52,390 | +28.8% |
| 2002 | 45,447 | −13.3% |
| 2011 | 34,331 | −24.5% |
| 2021 | 31,044 | −9.6% |
Source: Census data

In 1850, Petroșani was a small village, the vast majority of its 581 inhabitants being Romanian. According to the 1910 census, from 12,193 inhabitants 7,748 (63.54%) were Hungarian, 3,250 Romanian (26.65%) and 831 (6.82%) German. At the 2002 census, 83.3% of the city's inhabitants were Romanian Orthodox, 7.2% Roman Catholic, 3.7% Reformed, 2.2% Pentecostal, 0.8% Greek-Catholic, and 0.9% belonged to another religion. At the 2011 census, 90.59% of inhabitants were Romanians, 6.54% Hungarians, 1.82% Roma, and 0.35% Germans. At the 2021 census, Petroșani had a population of 31,044.

== Notable people ==
- Gabriel Apetri (born 1981), footballer
- Cosmin Chetroiu (born 1987), luger
- Aristică Cioabă (born 1971), football player and manager
- Iuliu Farkaș (1923–1984), footballer
- Cristina Adela Foișor (1967–2017), international chess master
- Nicolae Guță (born 1967), Roma manele singer
- Raluca Haidu (born 1994), artistic gymnast
- Monica Iacob Ridzi (born 1977), politician
- Cornel Irina (born 1976), footballer
- Iosif Kalai (born 1980), footballer
- Alex Leon (1907–after 1944), graphic artist and painter
- Cătălin Mulțescu (born 1976), footballer
- Călin Peter Netzer (born 1975), film director
- Răzvan Oaidă (born 1998), footballer
- Anamaria Ocolișan (born 1997), artistic gymnast
- Mircea Popa (born 1962), footballer
- Cosmin Rațiu (born 1979), rugby union player
- Lóránd Szatmári (born 1988), footballer
- Andreea Țîrle (born 2002), handball player
- Marin Tudorache (born 1968), football player and manager
- Vlad Tudorache (born 1995), footballer
- Dacian Varga (born 1984), footballer
- Patricia Vizitiu (born 1988), handball player

== Gallery ==
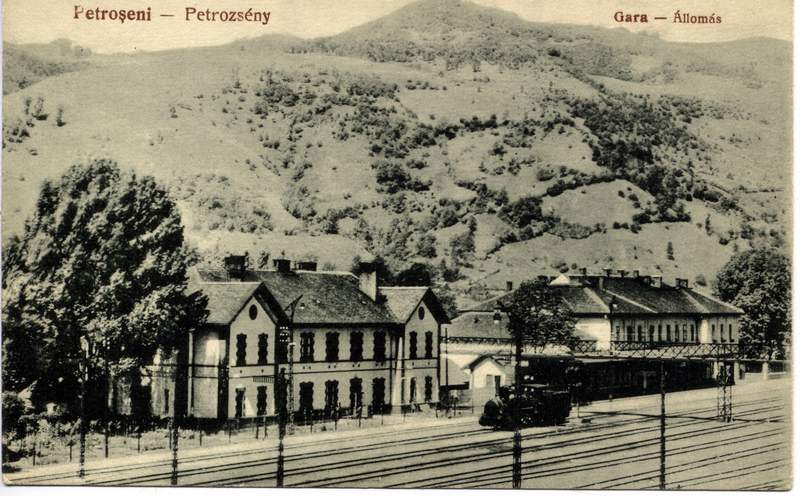
Petroșani railway station (1867)

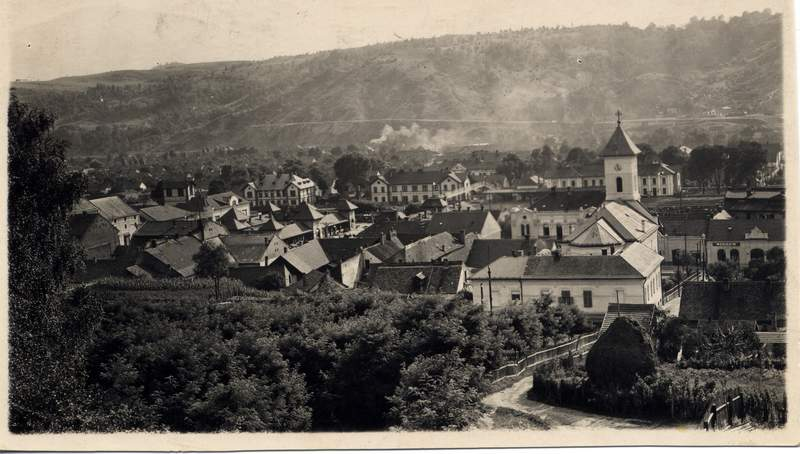
View of Petroșani c. 1910

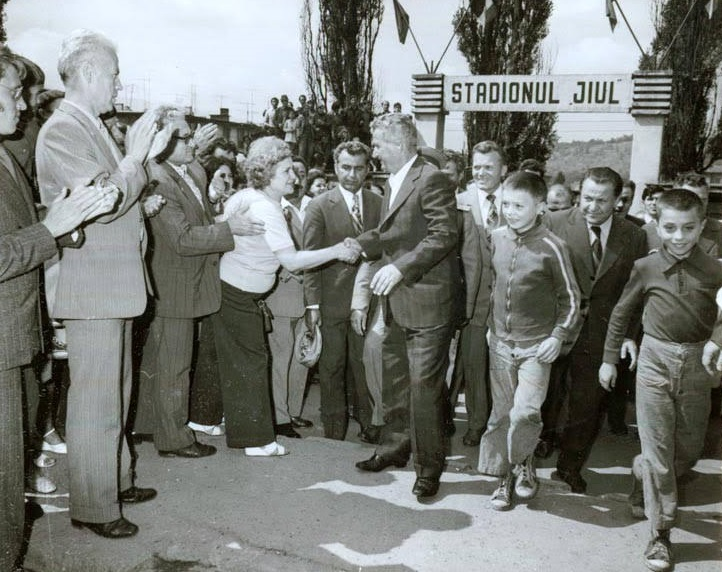
Nicolae Ceaușescu in Petroșani shortly after the 1977 miners’ strike

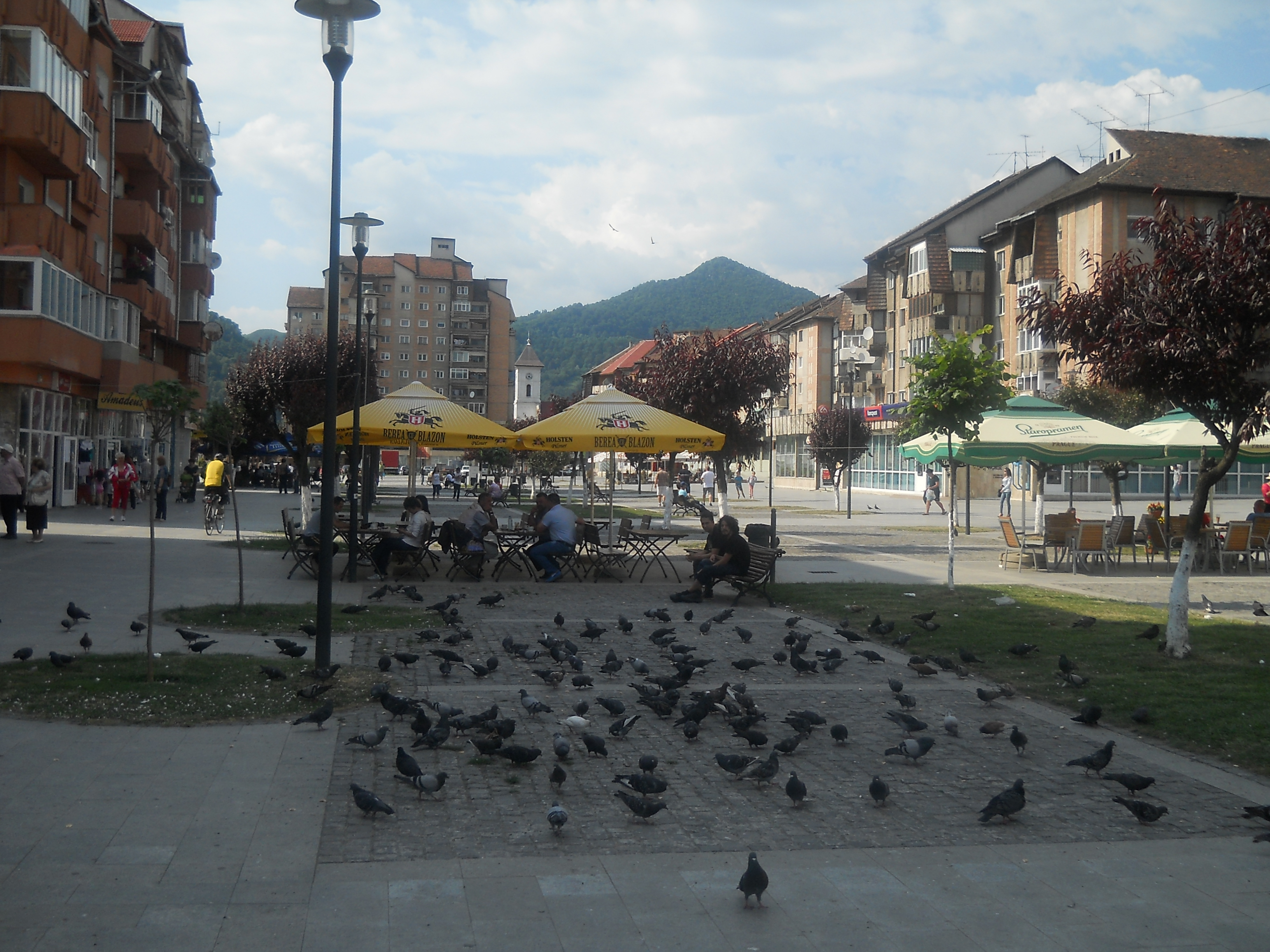
City center

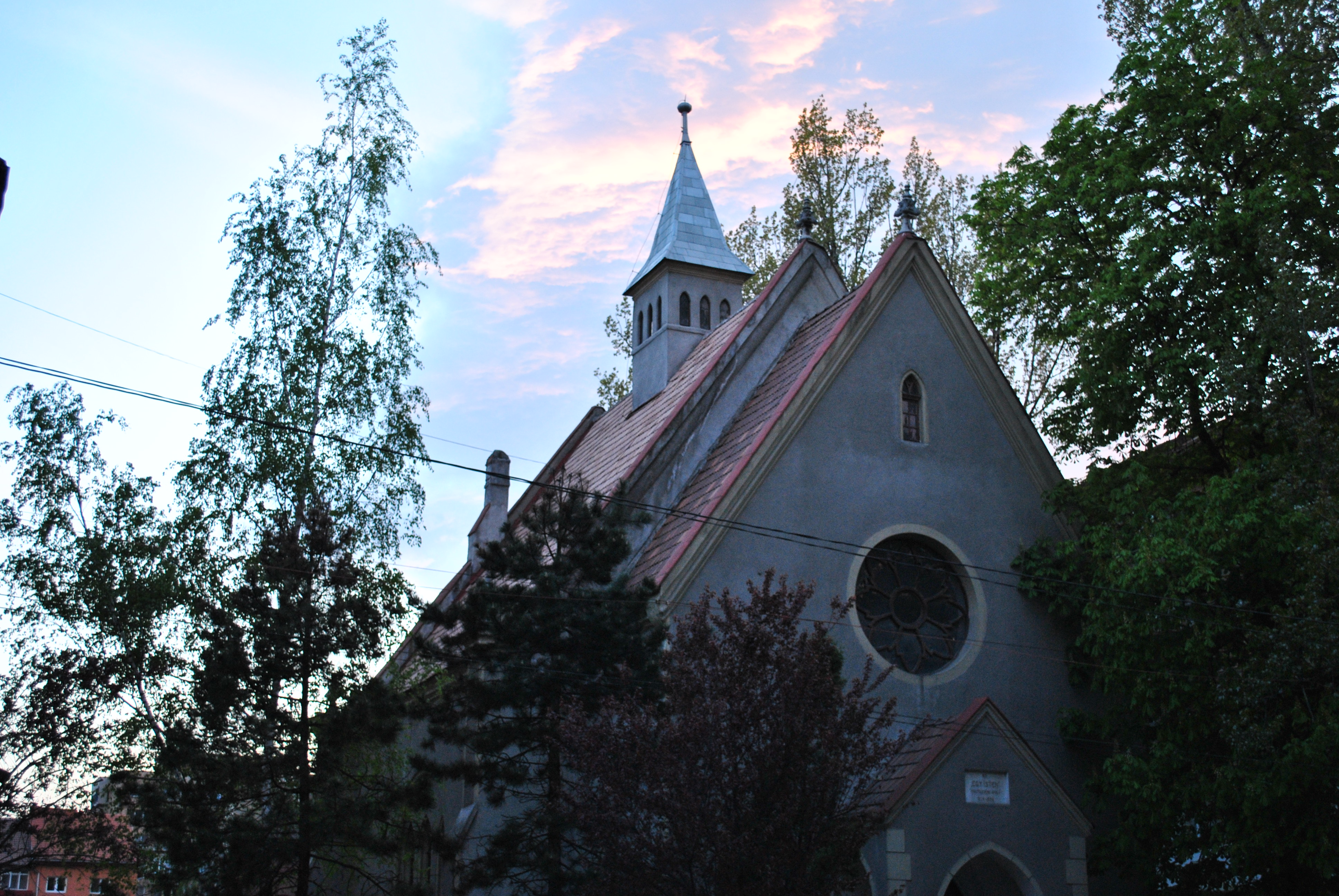

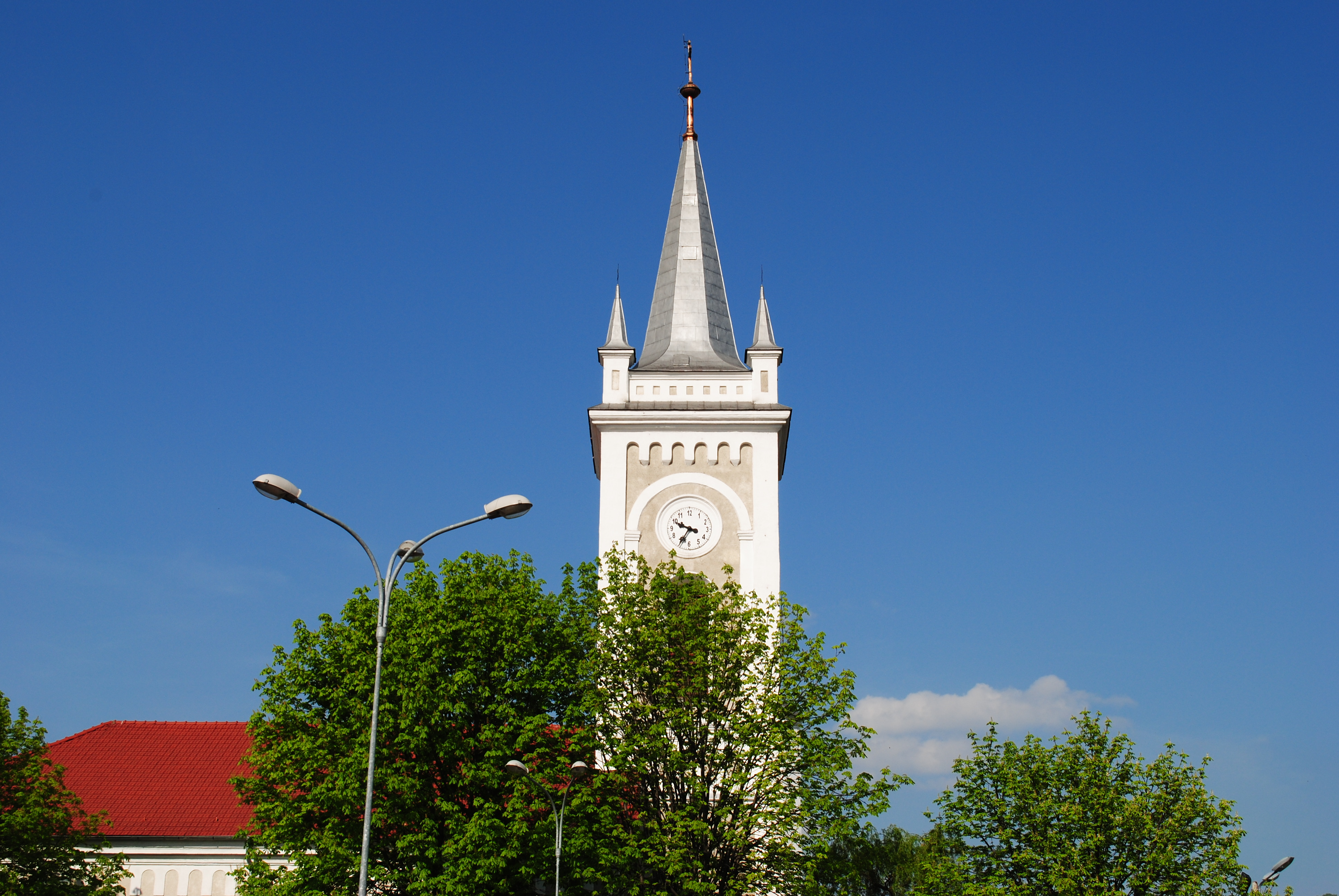

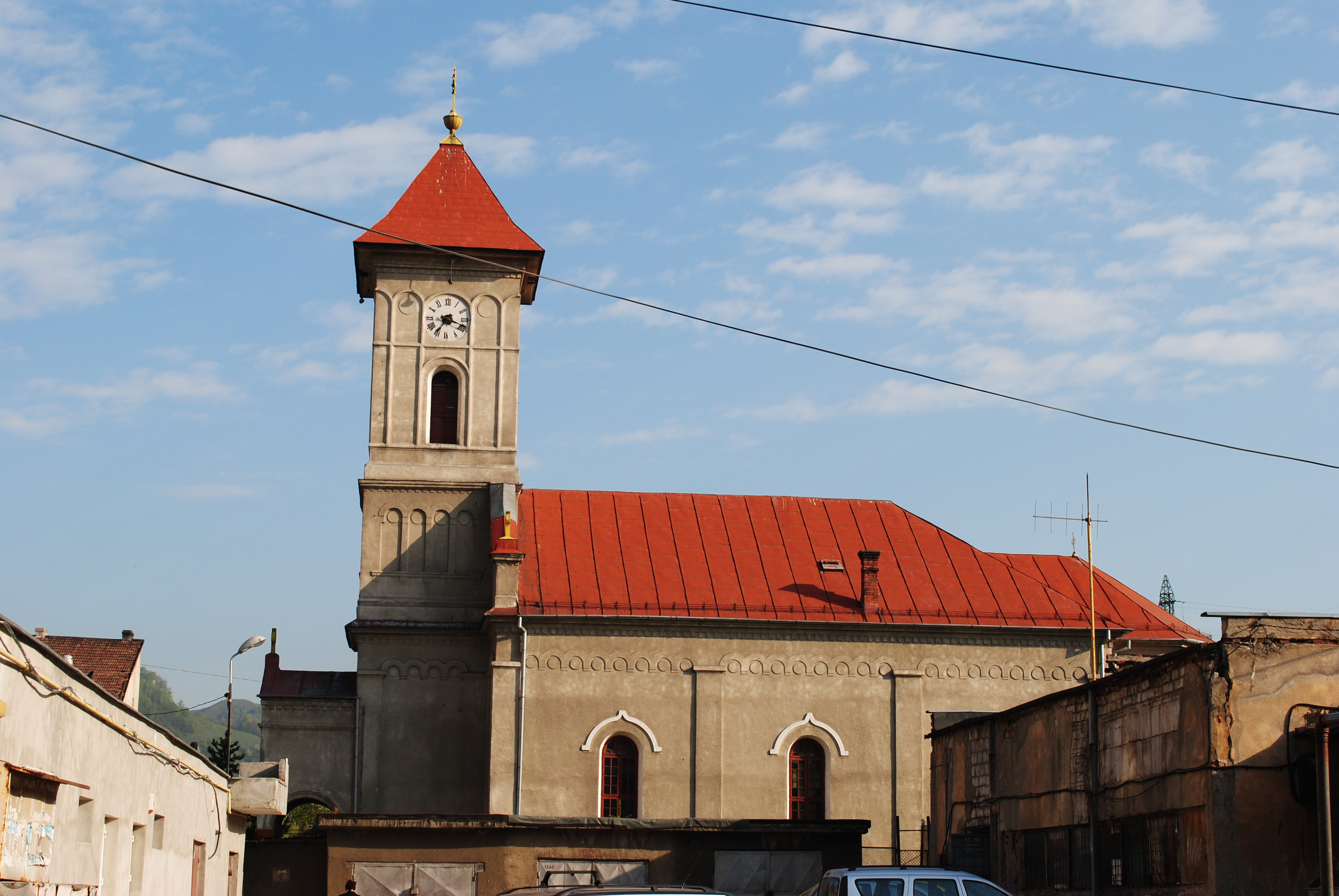

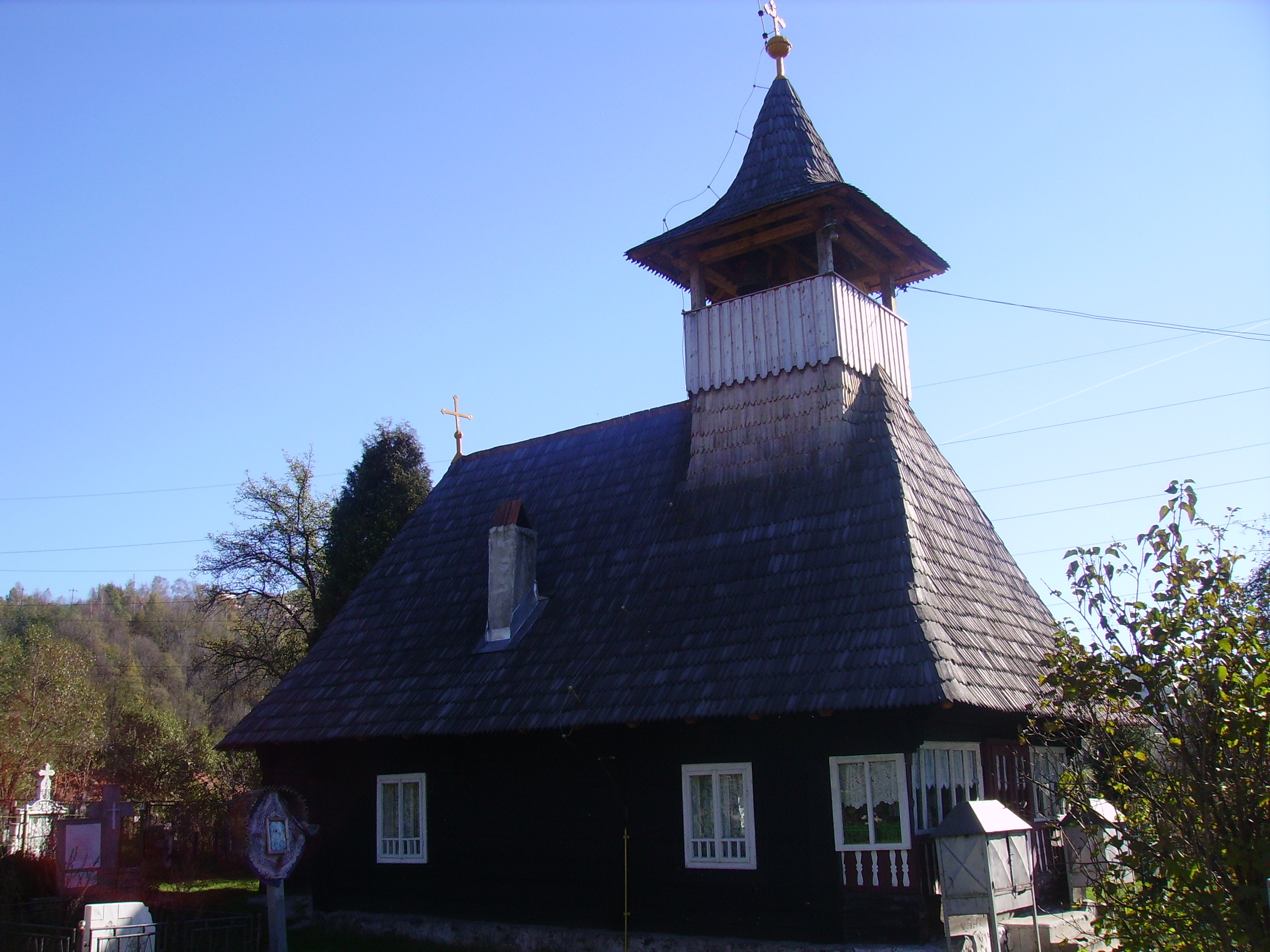
St. George wooden church in Sălătruc neighborhood (1788)
