= CSM Jiul Petroșani =

Association football club in Romania

Jiul Petroșani
- Full name: Clubul Sportiv Municipal Jiul Petroșani
- Nicknames: Minerii (The Miners); Jiuliștii (The People from Jiu Valley); Petroșenenii (The People from Petroșani); Alb-Negrii (The White and Blacks)
- Short name: Jiul
- Founded: 3 August 1919; 107 years ago as CAM Petroșani
- Ground: Petre Libardi
- Capacity: 15,500
- Owner: Petroșani Municipality
- Chairman: Radu Polifronie
- Manager: Sorin Bălu
- League: Liga III
- 2025–26: Liga III, Seria III, 5th
- Website: https://csmjiulpetrosani.ro/
| Home colours | Away colours |

Clubul Sportiv Municipal Jiul Petroșani, commonly known as Jiul Petroșani, simply as Jiul, is a professional football club based in Petroșani, Hunedoara County, founded in 1919 under the name of CAM Petroșani. Jiul Petroșani is one of the oldest active clubs in Romania. Founded before teams such as Steaua București, Dinamo București or Rapid București, Jiul, at its best, was ranked 2nd (1924–25) in the top-flight. For most of its existence, Jiul has been a constant presence in the first two tiers of the Romanian football league system, making it a traditional club in the country. In 1990, the closure of the Jiu Valley mines, the main engine of the local economy, led to the decay of Jiul, annually putting the club in danger of bankruptcy.

== History ==
=== 1919–1937: Foundation and early years ===
Chart showing the progress of Jiul's league finishes from 1934 to the present

Football was introduced to Jiu Valley in the early 20th century and was initially played in Petroșani at the present-day location of the Dâlja mine. Despite distrust and hostility from local coal miners, whose trade drove the local economy, a club was officially organized by Ion Winklehner, general manager of the Petroșani Society mines, under the name Clubul Atletic al Minelor Petroșani (Petroșani Mines Athletic Club) (CAMP). Early coaches included Iosif Keiling, Carol Krausz, Wilhelm Spitzer, and János Kovezdi.

In 1922, CAMP entered the District of Arad championship, where they played against teams from the Hunedoara Region. The club's owners brought in players from outside of Petroșani to make them a competitive team — these players included Iosif Klein, L. Kiminich, Adalbert Dankó, and Z. Veszprémy. In its first season, CAMP ranked third after AAC Arad and CS Vulcan. In the 1924-25 edition, they won the championship, now under the name Uniunea Cluburilor Sportive ale Societății Petroșani (Sports Club Association of Petroșani Society) (UCASP), adopted after merging with CS Vulcan in 1924. UCASP participated in the final stage of the 1924–25 Divizia A season after eliminating Universitatea Cluj and Jahn Cernăuți, but lost the final (1–5) against Chinezul Timișoara. Gheorghe Péterffy, Elemér Berkessy, and Ștefan Messner joined the team.

After the merger with CS Vulcan was reversed in 1926, UCASP merged with Jiul Lupeni and adopted its name. New standout players included Ioan Kiss and Aurel Guga. They participated in the national final of the 1927-28 season but lost (2–3) on 29 July 1928 against Colțea Brașov. This merger was also reversed and in 1929, Petroșani's team took on the name Jiul, inspired by the Jiu River, which passes through the city.

| Name | Period |
| CAM Petroșani | 1919–1924 |
| UCAS Petroșani | 1924–1926 |
| Jiul Lupeni | 1926–1929 |
| Jiul Petroșani | 1929–1950 |
| Partizanul Petroșani | 1950 |
| Flacăra Petroșani | 1951–1952 |
| Minerul Petroșani | 1953–1958 |
| Jiul Petroșani | 1958–1962 |
| Jiul Petrila | 1962–1966 |
| Jiul Petroșani | 1966–present |

Due to the popularity of Divizia A, which began in 1932–33, a second league, Divizia B, was established. The 1934–35 season began with five series based on geographic criteria. Jiul Petroșani was ranked 1st in the second series of Divizia B's first season. Rules at the time stated that a promotion tournament would be held between the winners of the five series. Jiul Petroșani won the tournament and went on to play a promotion/relegation playoff game against the bottom-ranked team, AMEFA Arad, in Divizia A, finishing 0–2 at Arad and 0–0 at home. Jiul Petroșani's top players at this point included Gusti Emerich, Géza Medve, Remus Radu, Szulle, Gheorghe Péterffy, and Gheorghe Vâjdea.

The 1936–37 season came with the introduction of Divizia C, the third tier, meaning that four teams from the two series in Divizia B were promoted. These teams were Phoenix Baia Mare, Vulturii Textila Lugoj, Olimpia Satu Mare, and Jiul Petroșani. Coach Rudolf Jeny led the team, including players Kiss, Bredan, Zastulka, and Gheorghe Vâjdea, into the club's first season in Divizia A.

=== 1937–1966: Years of consolidation ===
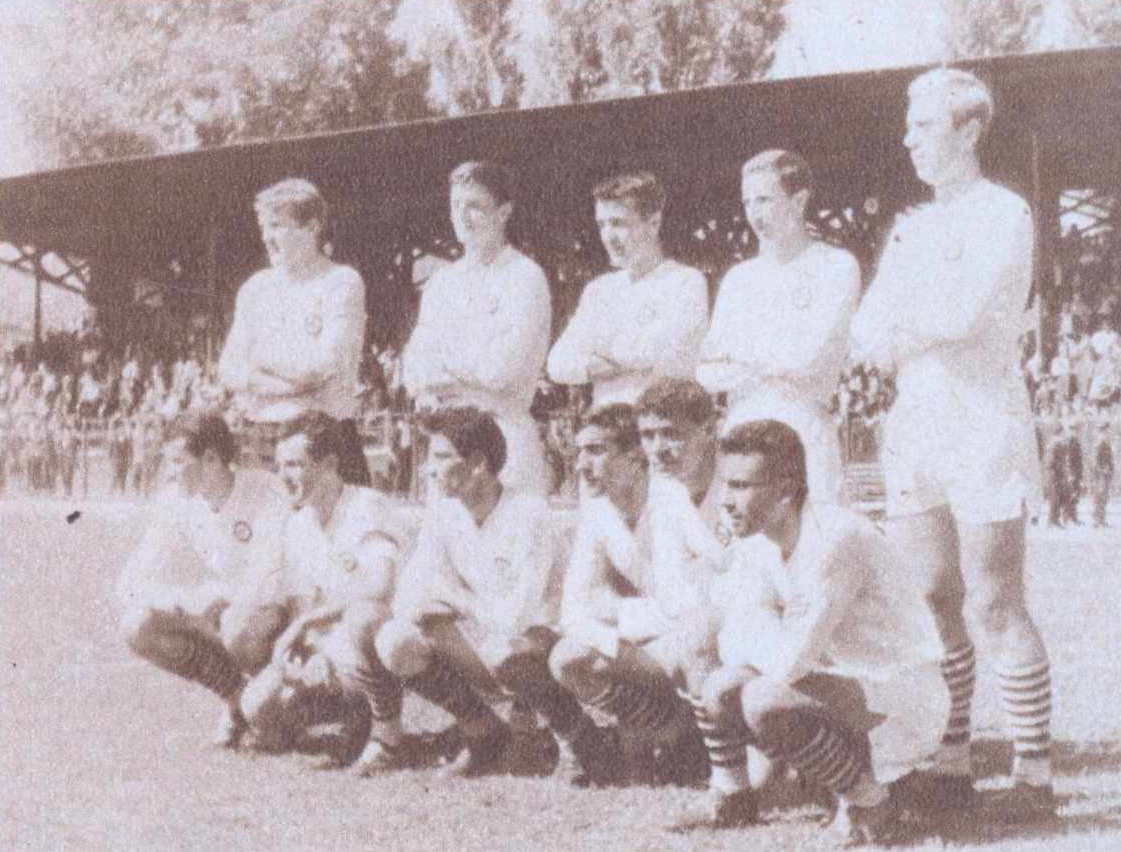
Jiul squad in 1965

Until the end of World War II, Jiul Petroșani oscillated between Divizia A (1937–38) and Divizia B (1938–41). Top players remained static: Gheorghe Vâjdea, Gusti Emmerich, and Géza Medve, along with Ernest Skovrán, who also played for Romania B. The club won the 2nd series of the second league at the end of the 1940-41 season but the championship was interrupted by the war and was put on hold until 1946. Jiul Petroșani advanced back to Divizia A. In the 1948-49 season, Jiul Petroșani achieved its best performance yet: they placed 3rd in the league after ICO Oradea and CFR București, despite having completed the prior season in 10th place. The success was due in part to acquiring Ion Panait, Costică Marinescu, and Tudor Paraschiva. Tiberiu Bone was also part of this squad.

Between 1950 and 1956, Divizia A played by the Soviet model in a spring-autumn system. The club continued ranking in the middle of league for several years under coaches Ion "Jean" Lăpușneanu and Andrei Sepci and with players Aurel Crâsnic, Tudor Paraschiva, Ștefan Coidum, Iuliu Farkaș I, and Ion Panait. At the end of the 1959–60 season, however, they were relegated back to Divizia B after 13 years in Divizia A. The squad only spent one season there before being promoted again under Coach Bazil Marian after defeating CSM Baia Mare in the series championship. After returning to Divizia A for the 1961-62 season, they were sent back down for the 1962–66 seasons. The squad focused on strengthening itself during that period and acquired players such as Florea Martinovici, Cornel Pavlovici, Emil Dumitriu, Petre Libardi, and Andrei Stocker. Coach Eugen Mladin took them back to the top league for the 1966-67 season.

=== 1966–1985: Golden Team ===
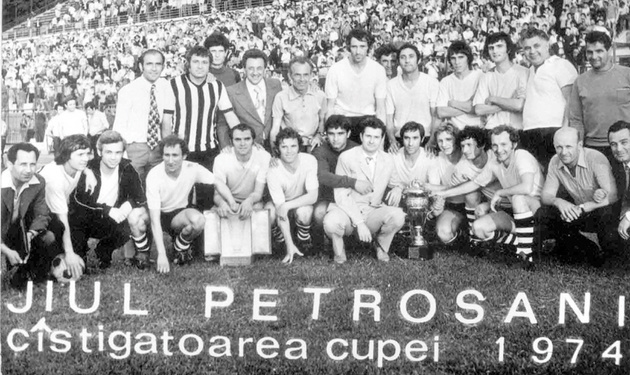
Jiul in the 1973–74 season, which triumphed in the 1974 Romanian Cup

Jiul Petroșani spent eight years in Divizia A, jumping between positions: 8th in 1966-67 and 1967-68; 6th in 1968-69; 7th in 1969-70; 13th in 1970-71; 12th in 1971-72; 10th in 1972-73; and 15th in 1973-1974. Under Coach Traian Ivănescu, however, the squad — including players Ion Nițu, Gogu Tonca, Andrei Stocker, Alexandru Nagy, Petre Libardi, Árpád Szűcs, Gheorghe Mulțescu, Adalbert Rozsnyai, and Mihai Stoichiță — defeated Politehnica Timișoara 4–2 in the 1973–74 Romanian Cup final and brought home the trophy for the first time. They were eligible for the European Cup for the first time but lost 2–3 in the first round on aggregate against Dundee United. Jiul Petroșani remained in the first league and jumped up to 5th place in the 1976-77 season under Coach Gheorghe Ene and with players including Iosif Cavai, Dragu Bădin, Grigore Ciupitu, Augustin Deleanu, Traian Stoica, Ionel Augustin, Gheorghe Mulțescu, and Florea Dumitrache

After losing their original stadium after a fire in 1975, the team's new stadium opened in Lunca Jiului park in 1982. At the end of the 1984-85 season, however, Jiul Petroșani was relegated back to the second league after 19 seasons. Three of the team's coaches were sacked and 24 players used, many of them suspected of match fixing.

=== 1985–2002: Ups and downs ===
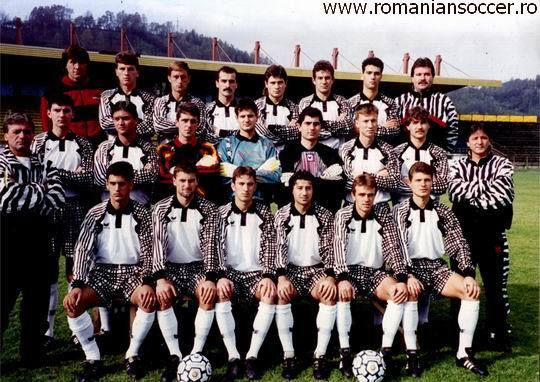
Jiul Petroșani in the 1995–96 season, which achieved the historic promotion

Jiul Petroșani continued to oscillate between leagues over the next 15 years. While Coach Gheorghe Mulțescu, a former Jiul player, got the team promoted back to Divizia A following the 1985-86 season, they fell again in 1987. They remained in Divizia B for two years until 1988-1989, when they were promoted. The two subsequent years in the first league were the height of players like Ioan Varga, Marian Bâcu, Horațiu Lasconi, Aristică Cioabă, Ion Sburlea, and Damian Militaru. At the end of the 1990-91 season, however, not only were they relegated, but they also spent several seasons in the middle of Divizia B, with 13th place in 1993-94 and 7th place in 1994-95. The team managed to turn itself around following the intervention of Miron Cozma, leader of the Miners Union League of the Jiu Valley.

Under Coach Ion "Liță" Dumitru and with standout players Leontin Toader, Aristică Cioabă, Marin Tudorache, and Fănel Țîră, Jiul Petroșani returned to the first league for the 1995-96 season. Ion Bivolaru, Cristian Pușcaș, Romulus Bealcu, Tudorel Zamfirescu and Tiberiu Csik joined the club over the next two years. Jiul was relegated at the end of 1997-98 with its most crushing defeat in club history: they finished the season with 10 points and only three victories out of 34 matches. Club ownership changed hands over the next several seasons and the team struggled; even after hiring experienced coach Ioan Sdrobiș, Jiul Petroșani was further relegated to Divizia C for the first time in its history at the end of the 2001–02 season.

=== 2002–2007: The last shine of the miners ===
Jiul Petroșani squad before a match against Politehnica Iași at the last season of the club in the first league

Despite its disastrous 2001-02 season, Jiul Petroșani only spent one year in Divizia C, winning the sixth series with 8 points over CS Certej. In 2003-04, Jiul Petroșani continued to push forward with determination and finished 2nd, just one point behind CFR Cluj. They finished the subsequent season in the third series tied with Gaz Metan Mediaș and were promoted back to Divizia A due to their better goal average. Coach Gheorghe Borugă's team advanced with players like Dumitru Hotoboc, Cătălin Mulțescu, Cornel Irina, Iosif Kalai, Mihai Pintilii, Szabolcs Perenyi, Vasile Ciocoi, Mircea Voicu, Damian Militaru, Gabriel Apetri, Adrian Drida, Adrian Dulcea, and Marian Pâcleșan.

The next two seasons saw a number of administrative changes and issues within the team and the club went through two different coaches: Ionuț Chirilă followed by Aurel Șunda. Despite acquiring Alin Paleacu, Florentin Dumitru, Alin Ilin, and Laurențiu Diniță, Jiul Petroșani finished 18th at the very bottom of the league with 20 points and the longest winless run (12 games) of the season. They returned to the second league, now called Liga II.

=== 2007–present: Financial problems and decline ===
The decline of the mining industry in the Jiu Valley, combined with relegation and recurring internal problems, marked the beginning of a prolonged period of sporting and financial instability for Jiul. In 2007, player Mihai Lungan accused club owner Alin Simota of having ordered his bodyguards to assault him after Lungan attempted to terminate his contract.

On the field, Jiul remained in the second tier for another three seasons, finishing sixth in the 2007–08 season and tenth in 2008–09. The 2009–10 campaign ended prematurely when the club was excluded from the championship because of financial and administrative problems. The exclusion further aggravated the club's financial difficulties and Jiul dropped to Liga IV for the 2010–11 season.

Jiul immediately won the Hunedoara County championship, finishing five points ahead of Minerul Uricani, but failed to secure promotion after losing the promotion play-off 0–1 against Flacăra Făget, the Timiș County champions. Despite losing the play-off, Jiul was subsequently admitted to Liga III due to vacancies in the competition and finished fifth in its series.

During the winter break of the 2012–13 season, Alin Simota withdrew his financial support and announced that control of the club would be transferred to the Petroșani municipality. The local authorities declined to assume responsibility for the existing entity, and Jiul withdrew from Liga III before returning to the county competitions. In 2014, the football team became part of the municipally funded sports structure in Petroșani, but limited resources meant that the club remained in the lower divisions for several years.

Jiul finished eighth in the 2013–14 season, ninth in 2014–15, 13th in 2015–16, ninth in 2016–17, 12th in 2017–18 and ninth in 2018–19. The 2019–20 season was disrupted by the COVID-19 pandemic, but Jiul was subsequently admitted to Liga III for the 2020–21 campaign.

Back in the third tier, Jiul gradually re-established itself as a regular Liga III side, retaining its place in 2020–21 and 2021–22, before finishing second in the Series VII play-out in 2022–23,and getting in the Play-offs of the Romanian cup ending the match in a 2-2 draw against Oțelul Galați, the eventual 2022-23 Liga II promoted team, but losing at the penalty shoot-out. In 2023–24, the Petroșani side again avoided relegation, while also reaching the third round of the 2023–24 Cupa României, where it was eliminated 1–4 by eventual cup winners Corvinul Hunedoara after previously defeating Retezatul Hațeg 17–0. Jiul finished sixth in the regular season of Series VIII in 2024–25 before winning the play-out with 39 points, while its 2024–25 Cupa României campaign ended in the second round after a penalty shoot-out defeat to Viitorul Pandurii Târgu Jiu, having previously eliminated local rivals Minerul Lupeni 1–0 after extra time. The 2025–26 season brought further improvement, as Jiul qualified for the promotion play-off, its best league performance since returning to the third tier, although it failed to reach the final promotion rounds. In the 2025–26 Cupa României, Jiul was eliminated 0–2 by Corvinul Hunedoara in the third round, and the club remained in Liga III for 2026–27. In the 2026–27 Cupa României, Jiul entered in the first round against ACS Unirea DMO and progressed to the third round, where it was eliminated 0–1 at home by Minerul Lupeni on 12 August 2026.

== Grounds ==
=== Stadium ===
==== Destruction of the first stadium ====
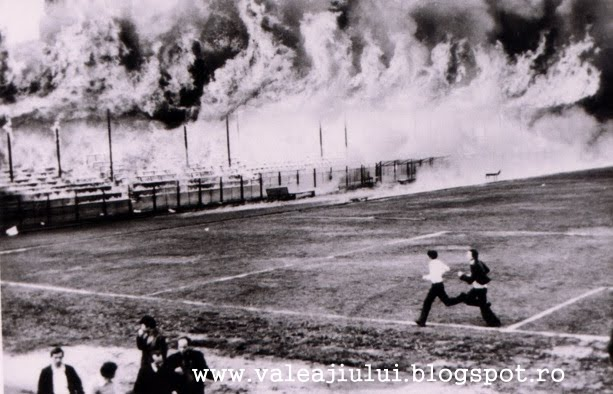
Fire at Stadionul Jiul (25 May 1975)

The first Stadionul Jiul was built in 1922 and was used until it caught fire on 25 May 1975 .

The Jiul Petroșani sports club has had two stadiums over time, and the current one would never have been built (perhaps just improved the old one) if not for an incident. This happened on May 25, 1975, at the single-stand stadium that had lasted almost since its foundation, more precisely since 1922 . On that day, a match was scheduled with FC Politehnica Iași, which was announced to be extremely tense due to the critical situation in which the miners were relegated from Division A. The match was led by the Bucharest referee Gh. Limona, who gave the start and the dispute proceeded normally until the 14th minute when the 53-year-old tribune caught fire, and the management was forced to start the construction of a stadium again. On the site of the old stadium are now the "Petroșani" Hotel and the "Carol Schreter" Central Park.

==== Current stadium ====
The new stadium became unique in Romania in 1981, and was the only one with two stands + the official one completely covered until the inauguration of the arenas in Cluj, Ploiesti and Bucharest. It was improved to new standards after the recent promotion to the Romanian Superliga in 2005, when the entire surface was covered with plastic seats, a training ground was illuminated and the press stand benefited from sockets and internet access. The construction still had an electronic scoreboard installed (quite old), an athletics track placed around the field, and four training fields belonging to the sports complex. Originally, the stadium had a capacity of 30,000 seats, but this was reduced to 15,500 seats as a result of the renovation in 2005, during which the old benches were replaced with seats. The stadium was renamed Stadionul Petre Libardi, in the honor of Petre Libardi, former captain of Jiul, on the club's 100-year anniversary in 2019.

== Honours ==
=== Domestic ===
==== Leagues ====
- Liga I
  - Runners-up (2): 1924–25 (as UCASP), 1927-28 (as Jiul Lupeni)
- Liga II
  - Winners (8): 1934–35, 1940–41, 1960–61, 1965–66, 1985–86, 1988–89, 1995–96, 2004–05
  - Runners-up (3): 1936–37, 1987–88, 2003–04
- Liga III
  - Winners (1): 2002–03
- Liga IV – Hunedoara County
  - Winners (2): 2010–11, 2019–20

==== Cups ====
- Cupa României
  - Winners (1): 1973–74
  - Runners-up (1): 1971–72

=== European ===
Balkans Cup

- Runners-up (1): 1977–78

== European record ==
| Season | Round | Club | Home | Away | Aggregate |
|---|---|---|---|---|---|
| 1974–75 European Cup Winners' Cup | First round | (Scotland) Dundee United | 2–0 | 0–3 | 2–3 |

== Players ==
=== First team squad ===
As of 10 September 2024

Note: Flags indicate national team as defined under FIFA eligibility rules; some limited exceptions apply. Players may hold more than one non-FIFA nationality.

| No. | Pos. | Nation | Player |
|---|---|---|---|
| 1 | GK | ROU | Leonard Mureșan |
| 2 | DF | ROU | Mario Geană |
| 3 | DF | ROU | Andru Lovas |
| 4 | DF | ROU | David Petruț |
| 5 | MF | ROU | Alexandru Giurică |
| 6 | MF | ROU | Remus Sandu (Captain) |
| 7 | MF | ROU | Vlad Toma |
| 8 | MF | ROU | Cătălin Sajin |
| 9 | FW | ROU | Vlăduț Buțurcă (Vice-Captain) |
| 10 | FW | ROU | Aurel June |
| 11 | MF | ROU | Andrei Gogescu |
| 12 | GK | ROU | Jan Turiță |

| No. | Pos. | Nation | Player |
|---|---|---|---|
| 13 | MF | ROU | Albert Stoenică |
| 14 | MF | ROU | Ciprian Iftimie |
| 15 | MF | ROU | Emanuel Jinga |
| 16 | DF | ROU | Ștefan Moraru |
| 17 | MF | ROU | Răzvan Covaci |
| 20 | FW | ROU | Andrei Istrate |
| 22 | DF | ROU | Alexandru Pătlăgică |
| 23 | MF | ROU | Răzvan Rotea |
| 25 | MF | ROU | Ianis Istrate |
| 26 | DF | ROU | Dacian Dunca |
| 33 | DF | ROU | Mathias Hondorocu |
| 36 | DF | ROU | Cristian Pruteanu |

=== Out of loan ===
Note: Flags indicate national team as defined under FIFA eligibility rules; some limited exceptions apply. Players may hold more than one non-FIFA nationality.

| No. / Pos. / Nation / Player | No. / Pos. / Nation / Player |

== Club officials ==
=== Board of directors ===
| Role | Name |
|---|---|
| Owner | (Romania) Petroșani Municipality |
| President | (Romania) Radu Polifronie |
| Sporting director | (Romania) Ion Radu |

=== Current technical staff ===
| Role | Name |
|---|---|
| Technical director | (Romania) Damian Militaru |
| Head coach | (Romania) Sorin Bălu |
| Assistant coach | (Romania) Damian Militaru |
| Goalkeeping coach | (Romania) Sorin Ghițan |
| Club doctor | (Romania) Raul Mursoi |
| Physiotherapist | (Romania) Radu Drăgușan |
| Masseur | (Romania) Octavian Fage |

== League history ==
| Season | Tier | Division | Place | Cupa României |
|---|---|---|---|---|
| 2026–27 | 3 | Liga III | TBD | Third round |
| 2025–26 | 3 | Liga III (Seria VI) | 5th | |
| 2024–25 | 3 | Liga III (Seria VIII) | 5th | |
| 2023–24 | 3 | Liga III (Seria VII) | 8th | |
| 2022–23 | 3 | Liga III (Seria VII) | 6th | |
| 2021–22 | 3 | Liga III (Seria VII) | 7th | |
| 2020–21 | 3 | Liga III (Seria VII) | 8th | |
| 2019-20 | 4 | Liga IV (HD) | 1st (C, P) | |
| 2018-19 | 4 | Liga IV (HD) | 9th | |
| 2017-18 | 4 | Liga IV (HD) | 12th | |
| 2016-17 | 4 | Liga IV (HD) | 9th | |
| 2015–16 | 4 | Liga IV (HD) | 13th | |
| 2014–15 | 4 | Liga IV (HD) | 9th | |
| 2013–14 | 4 | Liga IV (HD) | 8th | |
| 2012-13 | 3 | Liga III (Seria V) | 12th (R) | |
| 2011-12 | 3 | Liga III (Seria V) | 5th | |
| 2010–11 | 4 | Liga IV (HD) | 1st (C, P) | |
| 2009-10 | 2 | Liga II (Seria II) | 16th (R) | |
| 2008-09 | 2 | Liga II (Seria II) | 11th | |
| 2007-08 | 2 | Liga II (Seria II) | 6th | Round of 16 |

| Season | Tier | Division | Place | Cupa României |
|---|---|---|---|---|
| 2006-07 | 1 | Liga I | 18th (R) | Round of 32 |
| 2005-06 | 1 | Divizia A | 13th | Quarter-finals |
| 2004-05 | 2 | Divizia B (Seria III) | 1st (C, P) | |
| 2003-04 | 2 | Divizia B (Seria III) | 2nd | Round of 16 |
| 2002-03 | 3 | Divizia C (Seria VI) | 1st (C, P) | |
| 2001-02 | 2 | Divizia B (Seria II) | 15th (R) | |
| 2000-01 | 2 | Divizia B (Seria II) | 11th | Round of 32 |
| 1999-00 | 2 | Divizia B (Seria II) | 4th | |
| 1998-99 | 2 | Divizia B (Seria II) | 15th | |
| 1997-98 | 1 | Divizia A | 18th (R) | Round of 32 |
| 1996-97 | 1 | Divizia A | 14th | Round of 32 |
| 1995-96 | 2 | Divizia B (Seria II) | 1st (C, P) | |
| 1994-95 | 2 | Divizia B (Seria II) | 7th | |
| 1993-94 | 2 | Divizia B (Seria II) | 13th | Round of 32 |
| 1992-93 | 2 | Divizia B (Seria II) | 3rd | |
| 1991-92 | 2 | Divizia B (Seria II) | 3rd | |
| 1990-91 | 1 | Divizia A | 16th (R) | Round of 32 |
| 1989-90 | 1 | Divizia A | 14th | Round of 16 |
| 1988-89 | 2 | Divizia B (Seria II) | 1st (C, P) | |
| 1987–88 | 2 | Divizia B (Seria II) | 2nd | |
| 1986–87 | 1 | Divizia A | 16th (R) | Round of 16 |

== Notable former players ==
The footballers enlisted below have had international cap(s) for their respective countries at junior and/or senior level and/or more than 100 caps for CSM Jiul Petroșani.

- (Romania) Cristian Albeanu
- (Romania) Gabriel Apetri
- (Romania) Justin Apostol
- (Romania) Ionel Augustin
- (Romania) Dragu Bădin
- (Romania) Eric Bicfalvi
- (Romania) Marian Bâcu
- (Hungary) Elemér Berkessy
- (Romania) Tiberiu Bone
- (Romania) Iosif Cavai
- (Romania) Grigore Ciupitu
- (Romania) Aurel Crâsnic
- (Romania) Augustin Deleanu
- (Romania) Florea Dumitrache
- (Romania) Florentin Dumitru
- (Romania) Iuliu Farkaș I
- (Romania) Aurel Guga
- (Romania) Daniel Huza
- (Romania) Cornel Irina
- (Romania) Traian Ivănescu
- (Romania) Horațiu Lasconi
- (Romania) Petre Libardi
- (Romania) Constantin Marinescu
- (Romania) Florea Martinovici
- (Burkina Faso) Salif Nogo
- (Romania) Damian Militaru
- (Romania) Gheorghe Mulțescu
- (Romania) Victor Niculescu
- (Romania) Ion Nițu
- (Romania) Nicolae Negrilă
- (Romania) Marian Pâcleșan
- (Romania) Ion Panait
- (Romania) Tudor Paraschiva
- (Romania) Cornel Pavlovici
- (Romania) Mihai Pintilii
- (Romania) Mircea Popa
- (Romania) Octavian Popescu
- (Romania) Sergiu Radu
- (Romania) Adalbert Rozsnyai
- (Romania) Ion Sburlea
- (Romania) Gabriel Stan
- (Romania) Andrei Stocker
- (Romania) Mihai Stoichiță
- (Romania) Vasile Suciu
- (Romania) Daniel Timofte
- (Romania) Gogu Tonca
- (Romania) Marin Tudorache
- (Romania) Ioan Varga
- (Romania) Ion Voicu

== Former managers ==
- (Romania) Adalbert Szabo (1934)
- (Hungary) Rudolf Jeny (1935)
- (Romania) Coloman Braun-Bogdan (1940–1945)
- (Hungary) Rudolf Jeny (1945–1947)
- (Romania) Ștefan Wetzer (1951–1952)
- (Romania) Andrei Sepci (1955–1959)
- (Romania) Virgil Mărdărescu (1959)
- (Romania) Eugen Mladin (1964–1966)
- (Romania) Ștefan Coidum (1966–1968)
- (Romania) Titus Ozon (1968–1970)
- (Romania) Eugen Iordache (1971–1972)
- (Romania) Ștefan Coidum (1972–1973)
- (Romania) Ion V. Ionescu (1975–1976)
- (Romania) Traian Ionescu (1977–1978)
- (Romania) Viorel Mateianu (1985)
- (Romania) Constantin Oțet (1988)
- (Romania) Petre Libardi (1990–1991)
- (Romania) Dumitru Marcu (1991–1993)
- (Romania) Ion Dumitru (1995–1996)
- (Romania) Dumitru Marcu (1997)
- (Romania) Marin Tudorache (1999)
- (Romania) Ioan Sdrobiș (2000–2001)
- (Romania) Marin Tudorache (2001)
- (Romania) Dumitru Marcu (2003–2004)
- (Romania) Marin Tudorache (2005)
- (Romania) Marin Tudorache (2006–2007)
- (Romania) Ioan Sdrobiș (2007–2008)
- (Romania) Marin Tudorache (2011–2012)
- (Romania) Marin Tudorache (2013–2015)
