= Ionuț Moșteanu (football manager) =

Romanian professional footballer

Personal information
- Full name: Ionuț Codruț Moșteanu
- Date of birth: 10 August 1975 (age 51)
- Place of birth: Bucharest, Romania

Team information
- Current team: Minerul Lupeni (manager)

Managerial career
- Years: Team
- 2010: Pandurii Târgu Jiu (assistant)
- 2010–2012: CFR Cluj (assistant)
- 2013: CSMS Iași (assistant)
- 2013: FC Vaslui (assistant)
- 2013: FC Vaslui
- 2014–2016: Universitatea Craiova (assistant)
- 2018–2019: Concordia Chiajna (assistant)
- 2019–2020: Argeș Pitești (assistant)
- 2020: Argeș Pitești
- 2021–2022: Foresta Suceava
- 2026–: Minerul Lupeni

Ionuț Codruț Moșteanu (born 10 August 1975) is a Romanian football manager. In his career Moșteanu worked mainly as an assistant manager, for teams such as CFR Cluj, FC Vaslui or Universitatea Craiova, among others. He is currently the head coach for Minerul Lupeni since 2026.
