= Aurel Moise =

Romanian footballer

Personal information
- Date of birth: 1 November 1956 (age 70)
- Place of birth: Bucharest, Romania
- Position: Goalkeeper

Youth career
- Steaua București

Senior career*
Years	Team	Apps	(Gls)
1977–1978	Minerul Lupeni		
1978–1980	Jiul Petroșani	26	(0)
1980–1983	Politehnica Timișoara	81	(0)
1984	CFR Timișoara		
1984–1990	Politehnica Timișoara	114	(0)
1990–1992	CFR Timișoara (Note: The statistics for the 1990–91 Divizia B season are unavailable.)	22	(0)
Total		243	(0)
- * Club domestic league appearances and goals

Aurel Moise (born 1 November 1956) is a Romanian former football goalkeeper.

== Career ==
Moise was born on 1 November 1956 in Bucharest, Romania. He began playing junior-level football at local side Steaua, where he was teammates with Mario Agiu and also trained with the senior squad under coach Constantin Teașcă. He started playing at the senior level for Minerul Lupeni during the 1977–78 Divizia B season. In 1978, Moise joined Jiul Petroșani, making his Divizia A debut on 1 October 1978 under coach Gheorghe Ene in a 3–0 away loss to UTA Arad. The team reached the 1977–78 Balkans Cup final, where Moise replaced Iosif Cavai in the 72nd minute in the second leg of the 4–2 aggregate defeat to Rijeka.

In 1980, Moise moved to Politehnica Timișoara. He played four matches in the 1980–81 European Cup Winners' Cup campaign, as they got past Celtic in the first round before they were defeated by West Ham United in the following round. During the same season, the team reached the 1981 Cupa României final, where Moise was not used by coach Ion Ionescu in the 6–0 loss to Universitatea Craiova. Subsequently, he played in both legs of the 5–2 aggregate loss to Lokomotive Leipzig in the first round of the 1981–82 European Cup Winners' Cup. The team reached the 1983 Cupa României final, though coach Emerich Dembrovschi did not use Moise during the 2–1 defeat to "U" Craiova. Politehnica suffered relegation at the conclusion of the 1982–83 season. Although Moise stayed for the first half of the 1983–84 Divizia B campaign before moving to neighboring club CFR Timișoara, Politehnica secured an immediate return to the top flight without him. He rejoined the club in 1984, only to experience another relegation at the end of the 1985–86 season. Moise stayed on to help engineer an immediate promotion back to the first division, but the cycle repeated when they dropped down again in 1987–88—prompting yet another swift rebound led by Moise the following year. On 5 November 1989, he made his last Divizia A appearance in a 3–1 loss to Corvinul Hunedoara, totaling 162 matches in the competition. From 1990 to 1992, Moise played for CFR Timișoara in Divizia B, retiring afterwards.

== Honours ==
Jiul Petroșani

- Balkans Cup runner-up: 1977–78

Politehnica Timișoara

- Divizia B: 1983–84, 1986–87, 1988–89
- Cupa României runner-up: 1980–81, 1982–83
