= 1983 Cupa României final =

- Event: 1982–83 Cupa României
Universitatea Craiova	Politehnica Timişoara
Divizia A	Divizia A
2	1
- Craiova won 2–1
- Date: 6 July 1983
- Venue: Stadionul 23 August, Bucharest
- Referee: Dan Petrescu (Romania)

The 1983 Cupa României final was the 45th final of Romania's most prestigious cup competition. The final was played at the Stadionul 23 August in Bucharest on 6 July 1983 and was contested between Divizia A sides Universitatea Craiova and Politehnica Timişoara. The cup was won by Craiova. They were unable to play in the 1983–84 European Cup Winners' Cup as the closing date for entries was June 30. As a result, both the President and Secretary of the Romanian FA – Andrei Rădulescu and Florin Dumitrescu – were sacked.

== Route to the final ==
Universitatea Craiova

Round of 32	Universitatea Craiova	3–2	ASA Târgu Mureș
Round of 16	Auto Timişoara	1–3	Universitatea Craiova
Quarter-finals	Universitatea Craiova	2–0	Sportul Studenţesc
Semi-finals	Universitatea Craiova	1–1, 4–2p	Dinamo București

FC Politehnica Timişoara

Round of 32	Metalul Sighişoara	0–2	Politehnica Timişoara
Round of 16	Progresul București	1–2	Politehnica Timişoara
Quarter-finals	Politehnica Timişoara	1–0	Petrolul Ploieşti
Semi-finals	Corvinul Hunedoara	1–1, 8–9p	Politehnica Timişoara

== Match details ==
6 July 1983
17:00 EET

Universitatea Craiova	2–1	Politehnica Timişoara
Cămătaru 16', 67'	Report	Rotariu 87'

Stadionul 23 August, Bucharest
Attendance: 15,000
Referee: Dan Petrescu (Romania)

Universitatea Craiova	Politehnica Timişoara

Universitatea Craiova:
GK	1	(Romania) Silviu Lung
DF	2	(Romania) Nicolae Negrilă
DF	4	(Romania) Nicolae Tilihoi
DF	6	(Romania) Costică Ştefănescu
DF	3	(Romania) Nicolae Ungureanu
MF	5	(Romania) Aurel Ţicleanu	(substituted off) 63'
MF	7	(Romania) Ion Geolgău	(substituted off) 63'
MF	8	(Romania) Ilie Balaci
MF	10	(Romania) Mircea Irimescu
FW	9	(Romania) Rodion Cămătaru
FW	11	(Romania) Sorin Cârţu
Substitutes:
FW	14	(Romania) Aurel Beldeanu	(substituted on) 63'
DF	13	(Romania) Adrian Popescu	(substituted on) 63'
Manager:
(Romania) Constantin Oţet

Politehnica Timișoara:
GK	1	(Romania) Radu Suciu
DF	2	(Romania) Dumitru Ştefanovici
DF	3	(Romania) Gheorghe Șerbănoiu
DF	4	(Romania) Aurel Șunda
DF	6	(Romania) Nicolae Murar
MF	7	(Romania) Stelian Anghel
MF	8	(Romania) Laurențiu Bozeșan
MF	10	(Romania) Adrian Manea	(substituted off) 73'
MF	5	(Romania) Iosif Rotariu
FW	9	(Romania) Petre Lehman
FW	11	(Romania) Ion Petrescu	(substituted off) 65'
Substitutes:
FW	13	(Romania) Petre Vlătănescu	(substituted on) 65'
MF	14	(Romania) Titi Nicolae	(substituted on) 73'
Manager:
(Romania) Emerich Dembrovschi

MATCH OFFICIALS

- Assistant referees:
  - (Romania) Florin Petrescu
  - (Romania) Radu Petrescu
- Fourth official:

MATCH RULES

- 90 minutes.
- 30 minutes extra-time (15 minute intervals)
- Penalty shoot-out if scores level after extra time.
- Maximum of 2 substitutions.
