= Stelian Anghel =

Romanian footballer

Personal information
- Date of birth: 7 March 1952
- Place of birth: Brașov, Romania
- Date of death: 23 November 2009 (aged 57)
- Place of death: Timișoara, Romania
- Position: Forward

Youth career
- 1967–1971: Steagul Roșu Brașov

Senior career*
Years	Team	Apps	(Gls)
1971–1972	Metrom Brașov	24	(0)
1972–1974	Steagul Roșu Brașov	54	(12)
1974–1984	Politehnica Timișoara	262	(72)
1984–1985	UM Timișoara		
1985–1986	Minerul Bocșa		
Total		340	(84)

International career
1976	Romania	2	(0)
- * Club domestic league appearances and goals as of 17 January 2020

Stelian Anghel (7 March 1952 – 23 November 2009) was a Romanian former footballer who played as a forward. He was also president at Politehnica Timișoara.

== Club career ==
Anghel was born on 7 March 1952 in Brașov, Romania and began playing junior-level football in 1967 at local club Steagul Roșu. In 1971 he moved to neighboring club Metrom, where he started playing senior level football in Divizia C, helping it finish the season in first place, earning promotion to the second league. Shortly afterwards, he returned to Steagul where on 20 August 1972 he made his Divizia A debut under coach Nicolae Proca in a 0–0 draw against CSM Reșița. In the following season he helped the team finish in third place.

In 1974, Anghel went to play for Politehnica Timișoara, his first performance being a third place in the 1977–78 season. Afterwards he made his debut in European competitions, playing all four games in the 1978–79 UEFA Cup campaign as they eliminated MTK Hungária in the first round, being eliminated by Budapest Honved in the following one. Anghel won the only trophy of his career, the 1979–80 Cupa României, after coach Ion Ionescu used him the entire match in the 2–1 win over Steaua București in the final. In the same season he scored a personal record of 14 goals in the league. He then helped the club eliminate Celtic in the first round of the 1980–81 European Cup Winners' Cup. Anghel scored his first goal in European competitions in a 2–0 win over Lokomotive Leipzig in the preliminary round of the 1981–82 European Cup Winners' Cup, but the qualification was lost as they were defeated with 5–0 in the second leg. In the following years, he helped Poli reach two more Cupa României finals, both lost to Universitatea Craiova, Anghel appearing only in the one in 1983, when coach Emerich Dembrovschi used him the entire match in the 2–1 defeat. At the end of the 1982–83 season, the club was relegated to Divizia B, but he stayed with Politehnica, helping them get promoted back after one year. He made his last Divizia A appearance on 5 September 1984 in a 2–0 away loss to Corvinul Hunedoara, totaling 287 appearances with 75 goals in the competition and 10 matches with one goal in European competitions. Among these goals, three were scored in the West derby against UTA Arad, contributing to two victories and one draw for Politehnica. Anghel ended his career in 1986, after playing for UM Timișoara and Minerul Bocșa in the Romanian lower leagues.

== International career ==
Anghel played two games for Romania, making his debut on 12 May 1976 under coach Ștefan Kovács in a 1–0 away loss to Bulgaria in the 1973–76 Balkan Cup. His second game was a friendly that ended in a 2–2 draw against Iran.

== Later life and death ==
After he ended his career, Anghel was president at Politehnica Timișoara, and his biggest achievement was eliminating Atlético Madrid in the first round of the 1990–91 UEFA Cup.

He died on 23 November 2009 at age 57.

== Honours ==
Metrom Brașov

- Divizia C: 1971–72

Politehnica Timișoara

- Divizia B: 1983–84
- Cupa României: 1979–80, runner-up 1980–81, 1982–83
