= Dumitru Nadu =

Romanian footballer

Personal information
- Date of birth: 10 May 1957 (age 69)
- Place of birth: Drobeta-Turnu Severin, Romania
- Height: 1.78 m (5 ft 10 in)
- Positions: Right-back; centre-back; midfielder

Senior career*
| Years | Team | Apps | (Gls) |
| 1975–1976 | Metalul Turnu Severin | | |
| 1976–1982 | Politehnica Timișoara | 113 | (1) |
| 1982–1985 | Karlsruher SC | 49 | (6) |
| 1985–1986 | SV Linx | 23 | (10) |
| Total | | 185 | (17) |

International career
| 1979 | Romania B | 1 | (0) |
- * Club domestic league appearances and goals

Dumitru Nadu (born 10 May 1957) is a Romanian former footballer who played mainly as a defender.

== Club career ==
Nadu was born on 10 May 1957 in Drobeta-Turnu Severin, Romania. He began playing football at local club Metalul, in the 1975–76 Divizia C season. In 1976, Nadu joined Politehnica Timișoara where he made his Divizia A debut on 2 May under coach Constantin Rădulescu in a 5–1 win over Rapid București. In the 1977–78 season he helped the team finish third. Afterwards he made his debut in European competitions, playing three games in the 1978–79 UEFA Cup campaign as they got past MTK Hungária in the first round, being eliminated by Budapest Honved in the following one. Nadu won the only trophy of his career, the 1979–80 Cupa României when he was used by coach Ion Ionescu the entire match in the 2–1 victory in the final against Steaua București. He then helped the club eliminate Celtic in the first round of the 1980–81 European Cup Winners' Cup. He reached with Politehnica another Cupa României final in 1981 where coach Ionescu used him the full 90 minutes in the 6–0 loss to Universitatea Craiova. Nadu played his last two games in European competitions in the preliminary round of the 1981–82 European Cup Winners' Cup, but Lokomotive Leipzig qualified instead. He made his last Divizia A appearance on 22 November 1981 in a 2–1 home victory against ASA Târgu Mureș, totaling 113 matches with one goal in the competition, all of them for Politehnica.

Afterwards, Nadu ran away illegally from Communist Romania to West Germany, playing for Karlsruher SC. He made his Bundesliga debut on 1 September 1982 when coach Horst Franz sent him in the 65th minute to replace Wilfried Trenkel in a 4–0 home loss to Bayern Munich. That would be his only appearance during his first season as the club was relegated. He stayed with the club in the 1983–84 2. Bundesliga season in which he netted five goals which helped the team earn promotion back to the first league. In his last season, Nadu scored his only Bundesliga goal on 10 November 1984 in a 4–0 home win over Arminia Bielefeld. He made his 16th and last appearance in the competition on 8 June 1985 in a 1–1 draw against VfB Stuttgart, as Karlsruher SC was relegated once again. Nadu ended his career one year later at German fourth league team SV Linx.

== International career ==
Nadu made one appearance in 1979 for Romania's B squad, a 4–1 victory against the Soviet Union.

== Honours ==
Politehnica Timișoara

- Cupa României: 1979–80, runner-up 1980–81

Karlsruher SC

- 2. Bundesliga: 1983–84
