= Gheorghe Șerbănoiu =

Romanian footballer

Personal information
- Date of birth: 15 October 1950
- Place of birth: Brașov, Romania
- Date of death: 25 March 2013 (aged 62)
- Height: 1.76 m (5 ft 9 in)
- Positions: Right midfielder; centre-back

Senior career*
Years	Team	Apps	(Gls)
1968–1975	Steagul Roșu Brașov	93	(11)
1975–1984	Politehnica Timișoara	222	(13)
Total		315	(24)
- * Club domestic league appearances and goals as of 18 January 2020

Gheorghe Șerbănoiu (15 October 1950 – 25 March 2013) was a Romanian former footballer who played as a right midfielder.

== Career ==
Șerbănoiu was born on 15 October 1950 in Brașov, Romania and began playing football at local club Steagul Roșu. There, in the 1968–69 Divizia B season, coach Valentin Stănescu gave him his debut in senior football, and the team earned promotion to the first league at the end of it. In the following season, he made his Divizia A debut on 5 April 1970 under Stănescu in a 1–0 away loss to Dinamo București. He spent a total of six seasons in the first league with Steagul, the highlight of this period being a third place in the 1973–74 season. He played four games in the 1974–75 UEFA Cup, including a 3–2 victory on aggregate against Beşiktaş in which he scored a brace in the final minutes of the 3–0 victory in the second leg, also scoring once against Hamburg in the defeat in the following round.

In 1975, Șerbănoiu joined Politehnica Timișoara where he would make a successful partnership in the central defense with Dan Păltinișanu, their first performance being a third place in the 1977–78 season. Afterwards he won the only trophy of his career, the 1979–80 Cupa României, being used by coach Ion Ionescu the entire match in the 2–1 win over Steaua București in the final. He then helped the club eliminate Celtic in the first round of the 1980–81 European Cup Winners' Cup. In the following years he helped Politehnica reach two more Cupa României finals, which were both lost to Universitatea Craiova. Șerbănoiu appeared only in the 1983 final, when coach Emerich Dembrovschi used him the full 90 minutes in the 2–1 loss. At the end of the 1982–83 season, Politehnica was relegated to Divizia B, but he stayed with the club, helping them gain promotion back after one year. Șerbănoiu has a total of 286 appearances with 23 goals in Divizia A and 11 matches with three goals in European competitions.

== Later life and death ==
In the 1990s he went to live in Germany with his wife. One day she stabbed him out of jealousy, after which she committed suicide by jumping from the floor of the building they were living in.

In 2009, Șerbănoiu received the Honorary Citizen of Timișoara title.

He died on 25 March 2013 at age 62.

== Honours ==
Steagul Roșu Brașov

- Divizia B: 1968–69

Politehnica Timișoara

- Divizia B: 1983–84
- Cupa României: 1979–80, runner-up 1980–81, 1982–83
