= Viorel Vișan =

Romanian footballer

Personal information
- Date of birth: 21 January 1952 (age 74)
- Place of birth: Gădăleni, Romania
- Position: Centre back

Senior career*
Years	Team	Apps	(Gls)
1968–1976	CFR Cluj	177	(0)
1976–1982	Politehnica Timișoara	173	(0)
1982–1984	CFR Timișoara		
1984–1985	UM Timișoara		
Total		350	(0)

Managerial career
- 1991: Politehnica Timișoara
- 1999: CSM Reșița (assistant)
- 1999: CSM Reșița (caretaker)
- 1999–2000: CSM Reșița (assistant)
- 2000: CSM Reșița (caretaker)
- 2003: Politehnica Timișoara
- * Club domestic league appearances and goals as of 17 January 2020

Viorel Vișan (born 21 January 1952) is a Romanian former footballer and manager.

He was mostly known for his spell as a player at Politehnica Timișoara with whom he won the 1979–80 Cupa României, scoring one goal in the final against Steaua București. He also helped them eliminate Celtic in the 1980–81 European Cup Winners' Cup.

== Playing career ==
Vișan was born on 21 January 1952 in Gădăleni, Romania and began playing junior-level football at CFR Cluj. He started his senior career during the 1968–69 Divizia B season, at the end of which CFR earned promotion to the first division. In the following season, coach Constantin Rădulescu gave him his Divizia A debut on 7 December 1969, at age 17 during The Railwaymen's 4–2 away loss to Farul Constanța.

In 1976, Vișan signed with Politehnica Timișoara where his first performance was earning a third place in the 1977–78 season. Afterwards, he played four games in the 1978–79 UEFA Cup campaign as they eliminated MTK Hungária in the first round, being eliminated by Budapest Honved in the following one. Vișan won the only trophy of his career, the 1979–80 Cupa României, after being used by coach Ion Ionescu the entire match in the 2–1 victory against Steaua București in the final, in which he opened the score. He then helped the club eliminate Celtic in the first round of the 1980–81 European Cup Winners' Cup, being eliminated with 4–1 on aggregate in the following round by West Ham United. Subsequently, he reached another Cupa României final in 1981, which was lost to Universitatea Craiova, Vișan playing the full 90 minutes under coach Ionescu in the 6–0 loss. He made his last Divizia A appearance on 6 December 1981 in Politehnica's 2–0 away loss to Argeș Pitești, totaling 346 appearances in the competition and 10 matches in European competitions. Vișan ended his career in 1985, after playing two years for CFR Timișoara in the second league and one at UM Timișoara in the third league.

== Managerial career ==
Vișan started his career as head coach in 1991 at Politehnica Timișoara, following the departure of Costică Rădulescu. He was replaced in the summer of the same year by Ion Ionescu for whom he continued to work as an assistant. From 1999 until 2000 he worked as head coach and assistant at CSM Reșița. In 2003 he had his second spell as head coach at Politehnica, having a total of 33 games managed in Divizia A. Vișan also coached juniors, winning the 2002–03 national junior championship with Politehnica Timișoara.

== Honours ==
CFR Cluj

- Divizia B: 1968–69

Politehnica Timișoara

- Cupa României: 1979–80, runner-up 1980–81
