= 1981 Cupa României final =

- Event: 1980–81 Cupa României
| Universitatea Craiova | Politehnica Timişoara |
| Divizia A | Divizia A |
| 6 | 0 |
- Craiova won 6–0
- Date: 24 June 1981
- Venue: Stadionul Republicii, Bucharest
- Referee: Carol Jurja (Romania)
- Attendance: 25,000

The 1981 Cupa României final was the 43rd final of Romania's most prestigious cup competition. The final was played at the Stadionul Republicii in Bucharest on 24 June 1981 and was contested between Divizia A sides Universitatea Craiova and Politehnica Timişoara. The cup was won by Craiova.

== Route to the final ==
Universitatea Craiova

| Round of 32 | Caraimanul Buşteni | 0–1 | Universitatea Craiova |
| Round of 16 | Universitatea Craiova | 2–1 | Gloria Bistriţa |
| Quarter-finals | Universitatea Craiova | 2–1 | FC Argeş |
| Semi-finals | Universitatea Craiova | 4–0 | SC Bacău |

FC Politehnica Timişoara

| Round of 32 | Laminorul Roman | 1–3 | Politehnica Timişoara |
| Round of 16 | Politehnica Timişoara | 2–1 | Corvinul Hunedoara |
| Quarter-finals | Politehnica Timişoara | 3–2 | FC Constanţa |
| Semi-finals | Politehnica Timişoara | 2–1 | Arieşul Turda |

== Match details ==
24 June 1981
17:30 EET

| Universitatea Craiova | 6–0 | Politehnica Timişoara |
|---|---|---|
| Balaci 20', 41'; Donose 55'; Crişan 72'; Cârţu 74'; Negrilă 82' | Report |

Stadionul Republicii, Bucharest
Attendance: 25,000
Referee: Carol Jurja (Romania)

| Universitatea Craiova | Politehnica Timişoara |

Universitatea Craiova:
| GK | 1 | (Romania) Gabriel Boldici |
| DF | 2 | (Romania) Nicolae Negrilă |
| DF | 3 | (Romania) Nicolae Tilihoi |
| DF | 6 | (Romania) Costică Ştefănescu |
| DF | 4 | (Romania) Nicolae Ungureanu |
| MF | 5 | (Romania) Aurel Ţicleanu | (substituted off) 62' |
| MF | 10 | (Romania) Costică Donose |
| MF | 8 | (Romania) Ilie Balaci | (substituted off) 62' |
| MF | 7 | (Romania) Zoltan Crișan |
| FW | 9 | (Romania) Rodion Cămătaru |
| FW | 11 | (Romania) Sorin Cârţu |
Substitutes:
| FW | –– | (Romania) Aurel Beldeanu | (substituted on) 62' |
| DF | –– | (Romania) Mircea Irimescu | (substituted on) 62' |
Manager:
(Romania) Ion Oblemenco

Politehnica Timișoara:
| GK | –– | (Romania) Radu Suciu |
| DF | –– | (Romania) Dumitru Nadu |
| DF | –– | (Romania) Dan Păltinișanu |
| DF | –– | (Romania) Aurel Șunda |
| DF | –– | (Romania) Viorel Vișan |
| DF | –– | (Romania) Ion Dumitru |
| MF | –– | (Romania) Emerich Dembrovschi | (substituted off) 56' |
| MF | –– | (Romania) Adrian Manea |
| MF | –– | (Romania) Petre Vlătanescu |
| FW | –– | (Romania) Leonida Nedelcu |
| FW | –– | (Romania) Ion Palea | (substituted off) 56' |
Substitutes:
| MF | –– | (Romania) Titi Nicolae | (substituted on) 56' |
| FW | –– | (Romania) Gheorghe Cotec | (substituted on) 56' |
Manager:
(Romania) Ion Ionescu

MATCH OFFICIALS

- Assistant referees:
  - (Romania) Cristian Teodorescu
  - (Romania) Nicolae Rainea
- Fourth official:

MATCH RULES

- 90 minutes.
- 30 minutes extra-time (15-minute intervals)
- Penalty shoot-out if scores level after extra time.
- Maximum of 2 substitutions.
