= Mircea Irimescu =

Romanian footballer

Personal information
- Date of birth: 13 May 1959 (age 67)
- Place of birth: Craiova, Romania
- Position: Midfielder

Youth career
- Universitatea Craiova

Senior career*
Years	Team	Apps	(Gls)
1976–1990	Universitatea Craiova	318	(62)
1990–1991	Electroputere Craiova		
1991–1992	Sportfreunde Siegen		

International career
1983–1985	Romania	9	(2)

Managerial career
- 1995–1996: FC Universitatea Craiova (assistant)
- 1996: FC Universitatea Craiova (caretaker)
- 1997: Electroputere Craiova (assistant)
- 1999–2002: Extensiv Craiova (assistant)
- 2002–2003: FC Universitatea Craiova (assistant)
- 2004: Oțelul Galați (assistant)
- 2005–2006: Argeș Pitești (assistant)
- 2006: Politehnica Timișoara (assistant)
- 2006–2007: Național București (assistant)
- 2007–2008: Dacia Mioveni (assistant)
- 2008–2009: Pandurii Târgu Jiu (assistant)
- 2010: Pandurii Târgu Jiu (assistant)
- 2010: CFR Cluj (assistant)
- 2011: Steaua București (assistant)
- 2012: ALRO Slatina
- 2012: FC Brașov (assistant)
- 2013: CSMS Iași (assistant)
- * Club domestic league appearances and goals

Mircea Irimescu (born 13 May 1959) is a Romanian former professional footballer who played for Universitatea Craiova. He earned nine caps for Romania and participated in UEFA Euro 1984.

Irimescu spent most of his playing career with Universitatea, but also played for Electroputere Craiova and German side Sportfreunde Siegen before becoming a coach in his home country.

== Club career ==
Irimescu was born on 13 May 1959 in Craiova, Romania. He began playing junior-level football at local club Universitatea, winning a national junior championship in 1974. He made his Divizia A debut on 11 September 1976 when coach Constantin Teașcă sent him in the 67th minute to replace Sorin Cârțu in a 1–0 home win over Politehnica Iași. In the next round he scored in a 1–1 draw against Sportul Studențesc București. Subsequently, on 2 April 1977 he scored a brace in a 2–1 away victory against Politehnica Iași.

Irimescu went on to play 14 seasons for "U" Craiova, being part of the "Craiova Maxima" generation, helping them win two consecutive league titles in 1980 and 1981. At the first one he contributed with seven goals scored in the 26 appearances given to him by coach Valentin Stănescu and in the second he netted four goals in the 21 matches coach Ion Oblemenco used him. He also won the Cupa României four times, but played only in the 1981 and 1983 finals which were victories against Politehnica Timișoara.

Irimescu played 35 games and scored five goals for "U" Craiova in European competitions. In the second round of the 1979–80 UEFA Cup he netted a goal in the 4–0 aggregate win over Leeds United, as Universitatea became the first Romanian club that eliminated a team from England in European competitions. Subsequently, in the following round he scored a goal in the 2–1 aggregate loss to Borussia Mönchengladbach. Afterwards, they reached the quarter-finals in the 1981–82 European Cup by eliminating Olympiacos and Kjøbenhavns Boldklub, with Irimescu scoring once against the first, being eliminated with 3–1 on aggregate by Bayern Munich. Irimescu made nine appearances in the 1982–83 UEFA Cup campaign when they reached the semi-finals, scoring once against Shamrock Rovers, being eliminated by Benfica on the away goal rule after 1–1 on aggregate. Contributing four matches to the 1984–85 UEFA Cup run, he helped "U" navigate past Real Betis and Olympiacos before they ultimately fell to Željezničar in the round of 16. He made his last Divizia A appearance on 5 June 1990 under coach Sorin Cârțu in a 2–0 away loss to Corvinul Hunedoara, totaling 318 matches with 62 goals in the competition.

In 1990, Irimescu joined for one season Divizia B side Electroputere Craiova, helping them earn promotion to the first league. Then he went to play in the fourth league of Germany at Sportfreunde Siegen where he ended his career in 1992.

== International career ==
Irimescu played nine matches and scored two goals for Romania, making his debut on 7 September 1983 under coach Mircea Lucescu in a 2–2 friendly draw against Poland in which he scored once. He played two games in the Euro 1980 qualifiers, then scored one goal in the 4–1 victory against Yugoslavia in the second leg of the 1977–80 Balkan Cup final. He was used by coach Lucescu as a starter in the 1–0 loss to Portugal in the Euro 1984 final tournament, as his side failed to progress from their group. Subsequently, he scored his second goal in a 2–1 friendly loss to East Germany. Irimescu's last two appearances for the national team were during the 1986 World Cup qualifiers in a loss to Northern Ireland and a win over Turkey.

=== International goals ===
Scores and results list Romania's goal tally first, score column indicates score after each Irimescu goal.

List of international goals scored by Mircea Irimescu
No.	Date	Venue	Opponent	Score	Result	Competition
1	7 September 1983	Stadion Miejski, Kraków, Poland	Poland	2–2	2–2	Friendly
2	29 August 1984	Stadion der Freundschaft, Gera, East Germany	East Germany	1–0	1–2	Friendly

== Coaching career ==
After he ended his playing career, Irimescu worked for over 15 years as Sorin Cârțu's assistant coach. He also had some short spells as head coach at Universitatea Craiova during the 1996–97 Divizia A season, and in 2012 at second league side ALRO Slatina.

== Personal life ==
He married former long-distance runner athlete Maria Radu. Together, they had a boy named Paul, who played football in the Romanian lower leagues. In 2003, Irimescu received the Honorary Citizen of Craiova title.

== Honours ==
Universitatea Craiova

- Divizia A: 1979–80, 1980–81
- Cupa României: 1976–77, 1977–78, 1980–81, 1982–83

Electroputere Craiova

- Divizia B: 1990–91

Romania

- Balkan Cup: 1977–80
