= 1979–80 Divizia A =

62nd season of top-tier football league in Romania

Divizia A
- Season: 1979–80
- Champions: Universitatea Craiova
- Relegated: CS Târgoviște; Olimpia Satu Mare; Gloria Buzău
- Top goalscorer: Septimiu Câmpeanu (24 goals)

The 1979–80 Divizia A season was the 62nd edition of the Romanian football championship and the 42nd since the introduction of the divisional system. The season began on 12 August 1979 and concluded on 25 May 1980. Universitatea Craiova won the championship for the second time in its history.

== Teams ==
A total of eighteen teams contested the championship, including fifteen from the previous season and three newly promoted sides.

=== Team changes ===
Promoted to Divizia A

- FCM Galați – returned after a two-year absence.
- Viitorul Scornicești – debut.
- Universitatea Cluj-Napoca – returned after a three-year absence.

Relegated from Divizia A

- Corvinul Hunedoara – ended a three-year stay.
- UTA Arad – ended a thirty-two-year stay.
- Bihor Oradea – ended a four-year stay.

Other changes

- Viitorul Scornicești was renamed FC Scornicești during the first half of the season and subsequently became FC Olt Scornicești during the winter break.

=== Managers and locations ===
Location of teams in 1979-80 Divizia A

Club	City	Stadium	Capacity	Head coach
ASA Târgu Mureș	Târgu Mureș	23 August	12.500	Tiberiu Bone
Chimia Râmnicu Vâlcea	Râmnicu Vâlcea	1 Mai	15.000	Marcel Pigulea
CS Târgoviște	Târgoviște	Municipal	15.000	Ștefan Coidum
Dinamo București	București	Dinamo	18.000	Angelo Niculescu
FC Argeș Pitești	Pitești	1 Mai	15.000	Florin Halagian
FC Baia Mare	Baia Mare	23 August	12.000	Viorel Mateianu
FC Olt Scornicești	Scornicești	Viitorul (Note: Olt Scornicești was relocated, starting with the 18th round, to the 1 Mai Stadium in Slatina.)	8.000	Ion Cîrciumărescu
FCM Galați	Galați	Dunărea	18.000	Constantin Teașcă
Gloria Buzău	Buzău	Gloria	15.000	Virgil Blujdea
Jiul Petroșani	Petroșani	Jiul	5.000	Viorel Tîlmaciu
Olimpia Satu Mare	București	Olimpia	14.000	Ștefan Czako
Politehnica Iași	Iași	23 August	12.500	Leonid Antohi
Politehnica Timișoara	Timișoara	1 Mai	40.000	Ion V. Ionescu
SC Bacău	Bacău	23 August	17.000	Traian Ionescu
Sportul Studențesc	București	Republicii	40.000	Mircea Rădulescu
Steaua București	București	Steaua	30.000	Gheorghe Constantin
Universitatea Craiova	Craiova	Central	30.000	Valentin Stănescu
Universitatea Cluj-Napoca	Cluj-Napoca	Municipal	28.000	Gheorghe Staicu

=== Managerial changes ===
==== Pre-season ====
Team	Outgoing manager	Replaced by
CS Târgoviște	(Romania) Nicolae Proca	(Romania) Paul Popescu
Dinamo București	(Romania) Ion Nunweiller	(Romania) Angelo Niculescu
FCM Galați	(Romania) Mircea Nedelcu	(Romania) Constantin Teașcă
Jiul Petroșani	(Romania) Nicolae Oaidă	(Romania) Viorel Tîlmaciu
Politehnica Timișoara	(Romania) Angelo Niculescu	(Romania) Constantin Rădulescu

==== During the season ====
Team	Outgoing manager	Position in table		Replaced by
Team	Outgoing manager	Round	Position	Replaced by
Olimpia Satu Mare	(Romania) Gheorghe Staicu	10th	17th	(Romania) Ștefan Czako
Gloria Buzău	(Romania) Ion Ionescu	10th	17th	(Romania) Valeriu Neagu
CS Târgoviște	(Romania) Paul Popescu	15th	12th	(Romania) Ștefan Coidum
Politehnica Timișoara	(Romania) Constantin Rădulescu	15th	14th	(Romania) Ion V. Ionescu
Universitatea Cluj-Napoca	(Romania) Teodor Pop	17th	12th	(Romania) Gheorghe Staicu
Gloria Buzău	(Romania) Valeriu Neagu	19th	18th	(Romania) Virgil Blujdea
Olt Scornicești	(Romania) Dumitru Anescu	19th	12th	(Romania) Ion Cîrciumărescu

== League table ==
Pos	Team	Pld	W	D	L	GF	GA	GD	Pts	Qualification or relegation
1	Universitatea Craiova (C)	34	17	10	7	66	31	+35	44	Qualification to European Cup first round
2	Steaua București	34	17	10	7	74	44	+30	44	Qualification to UEFA Cup first round
3	Argeș Pitești	34	16	7	11	51	38	+13	39	Qualification to UEFA Cup first round
4	FC Baia Mare	34	18	3	13	57	51	+6	39	
5	Dinamo București	34	14	9	11	50	37	+13	37	
6	Sportul Studențesc București	34	16	5	13	44	34	+10	37	Invitation to Balkans Cup
7	SC Bacău	34	12	11	11	40	47	−7	35	
8	Politehnica Iași	34	16	2	16	47	45	+2	34	
9	Chimia Râmnicu Vâlcea	34	14	6	14	42	49	−7	34	
10	Politehnica Timișoara	34	15	3	16	47	50	−3	33	Qualification to Cup Winners' Cup first round
11	Jiul Petroșani	34	12	9	13	26	39	−13	33	
12	Universitatea Cluj-Napoca	34	14	4	16	44	43	+1	32	
13	Olt Scornicești	34	14	4	16	46	55	−9	32	
14	FCM Galați	34	12	8	14	50	61	−11	32	
15	ASA Târgu Mureș	34	13	5	16	45	46	−1	31	
16	CS Târgoviște (R)	34	12	7	15	48	53	−5	31	Relegation to Divizia B
17	Olimpia Satu Mare (R)	34	11	8	15	35	50	−15	30	Relegation to Divizia B
18	Gloria Buzău (R)	34	4	7	23	22	61	−39	15	Relegation to Divizia B

Source: LT
Rules for classification: 1) points; 2) goal difference; 3) number of goals scored
(C) Champions; (R) Relegated

=== Results ===
Home \ Away	UCV	STE	ARG	BMA	DIN	SPO	BAC	PIA	CRV	PTM	JIU	UCJ	OLT	GAL	ASA	TÂR	OLI	GBZ
Universitatea Craiova		1–2	4–2	5–2	1–0	0–0	3–0	2–0	6–0	4–0	5–0	2–0	1–1	3–1	1–0	5–0	4–0	4–0
Steaua București	4–0		2–2	3–1	1–1	0–3	4–4	3–1	6–1	7–1	4–0	2–0	4–1	2–2	2–1	6–0	1–1	2–0
Argeș Pitești	1–0	1–0		2–0	1–1	2–0	5–0	3–1	1–1	2–0	0–1	0–0	4–2	1–0	2–1	2–0	1–1	6–2
FC Baia Mare	3–3	4–2	1–1		0–1	4–0	3–1	1–0	1–0	3–2	1–0	2–0	3–1	7–1	2–0	3–2	2–1	2–0
Dinamo București	2–2	1–1	3–2	4–0		0–0	1–0	4–1	2–0	1–1	2–2	1–2	3–0	1–1	5–1	1–2	2–0	2–1
Sportul Studențesc București	3–0	1–2	0–1	3–1	2–1		1–0	2–0	1–0	0–0	1–2	0–1	3–2	3–1	4–0	1–0	3–1	4–0
SC Bacău	1–1	0–0	1–0	2–0	1–0	1–0		5–2	2–2	0–0	1–0	3–1	3–1	2–2	1–0	0–0	1–0	1–1
Politehnica Iași	2–0	1–2	1–0	3–1	1–0	2–0	1–1		2–0	3–2	4–0	1–0	2–0	2–0	1–0	5–3	5–1	2–1
Chimia Râmnicu Vâlcea	1–1	2–1	1–2	2–2	3–1	2–1	2–0	2–0		3–0	2–0	3–1	4–1	1–0	1–3	1–0	2–0	1–0
Politehnica Timișoara	0–2	1–3	0–1	2–0	1–0	2–1	6–1	1–0	1–0		2–0	2–0	4–0	3–0	1–0	2–0	1–0	4–0
Jiul Petroșani	0–0	1–1	2–0	0–1	3–1	0–1	0–2	1–0	0–0	2–0		1–0	0–0	3–0	1–0	1–0	1–1	1–0
Universitatea Cluj-Napoca	0–0	1–2	1–2	3–1	0–1	0–1	3–0	1–0	1–2	3–2	4–0		1–0	5–3	1–0	3–0	2–0	3–1
Olt Scornicești	0–2	1–0	1–0	2–0	2–3	2–0	1–0	2–0	5–0	3–1	1–0	3–2		1–0	1–0	2–2	6–0	2–1
FCM Galați	1–2	1–1	2–1	2–1	2–0	1–1	1–0	3–2	3–2	1–3	0–0	2–2	1–0		2–0	2–0	3–0	4–0
ASA Târgu Mureș	2–1	2–0	2–2	1–0	0–0	4–2	2–1	1–0	0–0	2–1	2–0	2–3	7–0	5–2		2–1	2–2	2–0
CS Târgoviște	1–1	4–0	3–0	0–1	3–1	1–1	1–1	1–1	2–1	5–1	2–2	2–0	2–1	3–1	4–0		1–3	1–0
Olimpia Satu Mare	2–0	1–2	2–0	0–1	0–3	1–0	2–2	2–0	2–0	2–0	0–1	2–0	1–1	2–2	1–0	2–0		1–1
Gloria Buzău	0–0	2–2	2–1	2–3	0–1	0–1	1–2	0–1	1–0	1–0	1–1	0–0	1–0	2–3	1–1	0–2	0–1	

Source: LT (in Romanian)
Legend: Blue = home team win; Yellow = draw; Red = away team win.

== Top goalscorers ==
Rank	Player	Club	Goals
1	Septimiu Câmpeanu	Universitatea Cluj	24
2	Marcel Răducanu	Steaua București	23
3	Rodion Cămătaru	Universitatea Craiova	17
3	Mihai Costea	Politehnica Iaşi	17
5	Sorin Gângu	Chimia Râmnicu Vâlcea	15
5	Alexandru Terheș	FC Baia Mare	15

== Champion squad ==
Universitatea Craiova

Goalkeepers: Gabriel Boldici (33 / 0); Silviu Lung (3 / 0).
Defenders: Nicolae Negrilă (22 / 4); Petre Purima (17 / 1); Adrian Bumbescu (14 / 0); Nicolae Tilihoi (23 / 0); Costică Ștefănescu (30 / 1); Nicolae Ungureanu (34 / 1).
Midfielders: Aurel Țicleanu (31 / 1); Aurel Beldeanu (30 / 4); Ion Geolgău (24 / 2); Costică Donose (27 / 5).
Forwards: Zoltan Crișan (29 / 3); Rodion Cămătaru (26 / 17); Sorin Cârțu (27 / 13); Ilie Balaci (29 / 6); Mircea Irimescu (26 / 7); Marius Gârleșteanu (4 / 0); Dumitru Marcu (1 / 0).
(league appearances and goals listed in brackets)

Manager: Valentin Stănescu.

== Attendances ==
#	Club	Average	Highest
1	Craiova	21,882	40,000
2	U Cluj	21,000	30,000
3	Dunărea Galați	19,235	30,000
4	Timișoara	13,882	30,000
5	Steaua	13,882	35,000
6	Târgoviște	13,176	20,000
7	Râmnicu Vâlcea	12,882	16,000
8	Baia Mare	12,294	17,000
9	Bacău	11,471	22,000
10	Buzău	10,941	20,000
11	Iași	10,706	20,000
12	Dinamo 1948	10,412	18,000
13	Argeș	10,412	18,000
14	Târgu Mureș	9,941	18,000
15	Satu Mare	8,118	17,000
16	Olt Scornicești	7,912	15,000
17	Jiul	6,176	12,000
18	Sportul Studențesc	5,141	20,000

== See also ==
- 1979–80 Divizia B
- 1979–80 Divizia C
- 1979–80 County Championship
- 1979–80 Cupa României
