= Dan Păltinișanu =

Romanian footballer (1951–1995)

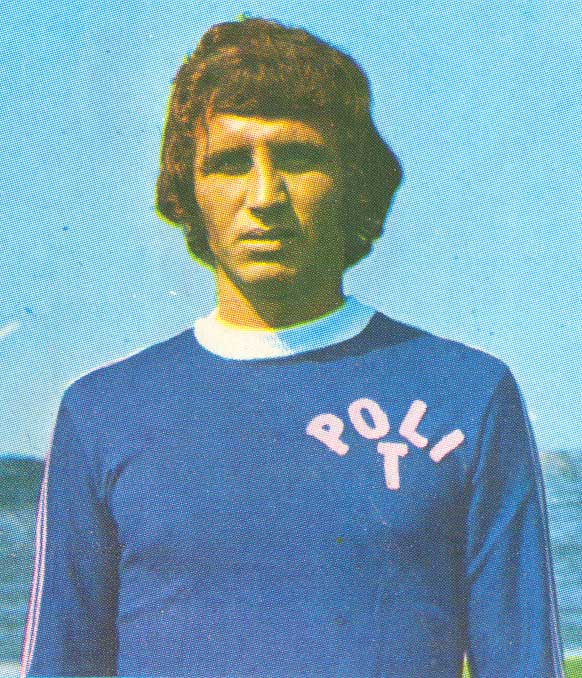

Personal information
- Date of birth: 23 March 1951
- Place of birth: Bucharest, Romania
- Date of death: 4 March 1995 (aged 43)
- Place of death: Timișoara, Romania
- Height: 1.85 m (6 ft 1 in)
- Position: Centre-back

Youth career
- 1962–1965: TM București
- 1965–1970: Dinamo București

Senior career*
Years	Team	Apps	(Gls)
1970–1972	FC Brașov	1	(0)
1972–1973	Metrom Brașov	26	(0)
1973–1983	Politehnica Timișoara	271	(24)
1983–1985	Unirea Sânnicolau Mare		
Total		298	(24)

International career
1976	Romania U23	1	(0)
1976	Romania B	1	(0)
1978–1979	Romania	3	(0)
Medal record
Representing Romania
Universiade
Gold medal – first place	1974 Nice	Team
- * Club domestic league appearances and goals

Dan Păltinișanu (23 March 1951 – 4 March 1995) was a Romanian footballer who played as a defender.

He was mostly known for his spell at Politehnica Timișoara with whom he won the 1979–80 Cupa României, scoring the victory goal in the final against Steaua București. He also scored the goal that helped them eliminate Celtic in the 1980–81 European Cup Winners' Cup.

== Club career ==
Păltinișanu, nicknamed "Tata Mare" (Big Daddy), was born on 23 March 1951 in Bucharest, Romania and began playing junior-level football in 1962 at TM București, three years later moving to Dinamo București. He started his senior career at FC Brașov, making his Divizia A debut on 11 June 1972 under coach Nicolae Proca in a 0–0 draw against Politehnica Iași. After playing only one league match for FC Brașov, Păltinișanu went for one season in the second division at Metrom Brașov. In 1973, he signed with Politehnica Timișoara. In his first season the team reached the Cupa României final where coach Ion Ionescu used him the entire match in the 4–2 loss to Jiul Petroșani. Starting from 1975, he would make a successful partnership in the central defense with Gheorghe Șerbănoiu, their first performance being a third place in the 1977–78 season. Păltinișanu played three games in the 1978–79 UEFA Cup campaign as in the first round they got past MTK Hungária against whom he scored a goal, being eliminated by Budapest Honved in the following one in which he also netted once.

He won the only trophy of his career, the 1979–80 Cupa României, after coach Ionescu used him for the full 90 minutes of the final against Steaua București, where he scored the decisive goal in their 2–1 victory. He then scored a goal that helped the club eliminate Celtic in the first round of the 1980–81 European Cup Winners' Cup, but they were eliminated with a 4–1 aggregate score in the following round by West Ham United, against whom he scored in the 1–0 win in the second leg. In the following years he helped Politehnica reach two more Cupa României finals, both lost to Universitatea Craiova, Păltinișanu appearing only in the one in 1981, when coach Ionescu used him the entire match in the 6–0 loss. He made his last Divizia A appearance on 4 May 1983 in a 3–1 away loss to Dinamo București, totaling 272 appearances with 24 goals in the competition and nine matches with four goals in European competitions. Păltinișanu ended his career in 1985, after playing two years for Unirea Sânnicolau Mare in the third league.

For his performances achieved at Politehnica, the Dan Păltinișanu Stadium in Timișoara was named in his honor.

Păltinișanu won the Universiade gold medal with Romania's students football team in the 1974 edition of the tournament that was held in France, playing alongside László Bölöni, Gheorghe Mulțescu, Romulus Chihaia and Paul Cazan.

== International career ==
Păltinișanu made appearances in 1976 for Romania's under-23 and B squads.

Păltinișanu played three games for Romania's senior team, making his debut on 31 May 1978 under coach Ștefan Kovács in a 1–1 draw against Bulgaria in the 1977–80 Balkan Cup. His following two games were friendlies, a 1–0 loss to East Germany and a 3–1 loss against the Soviet Union.

== Personal life and death ==
His son, who is also named Dan Păltinișanu, was a basketball player who played for Romania's national team and won the Romanian Cup while playing for BCM Elba Timișoara in 2010.

He died on 4 March 1995, two weeks before turning 44. After his death, his former coach, Ion Ionescu wrote an article in the Fotbal Vest newspaper about Păltinișanu, describing him as:"Coming modestly and shyly from the bohemia of Bucharest, two houses from the Mărțișor of Arghezi, Pălti was assimilated to the Banat with immense love and joy. Where, in turn, he found his joy and immortality. Dan Păltinișanu enters the gallery of the greatest players of Timișoara and Politehnica. Symbol of football in these lands. Symbol of the devouring will for victory. For which he burned strongly.. And, perhaps, that is why so quickly".

== Honours ==
Politehnica Timișoara

- Cupa României: 1979–80, runner-up 1973–74, 1980–81, 1982–83
