= Silviu Lung =

Romanian footballer and manager

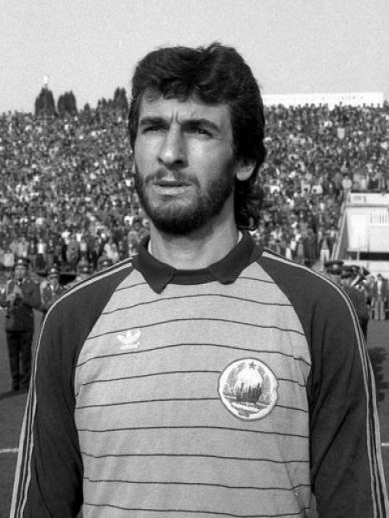
- Silviu Lung lining up for Romania in 1989

Personal information
- Date of birth: 9 September 1956 (age 70)
- Place of birth: Sânmiclăuș, Romania
- Height: 1.94 m (6 ft 4 in)
- Position: Goalkeeper

Team information
- Current team: Romania U20 (GK coach)

Youth career
- –1971: Victoria Carei

Senior career*
Years	Team	Apps	(Gls)
1971–1974	Victoria Carei	42	(0)
1974–1988	Universitatea Craiova	309	(0)
1988–1990	Steaua București	49	(0)
1990–1991	Logroñés	9	(0)
1991–1992	Electroputere Craiova	35	(0)
1993–1994	Universitatea Craiova	26	(0)
Total		470	(0)

International career
1978–1979	Romania U21	6	(0)
1979–1993	Romania	76	(0)
1994	World XI	1	(0)

Managerial career
- 1994: Universitatea Craiova (assistant)
- 1994: Olympique de Casablanca
- 1995: Național București (assistant)
- 1995: Minerul Motru
- 1996–1997: Minerul Motru
- 1997: Universitatea Craiova (caretaker)
- 1997–1999: Universitatea Craiova (assistant)
- 1998: Universitatea Craiova (caretaker)
- 2000–2002: Nagoya Grampus (assistant)
- 2003–2006: Universitatea Craiova (GK coach)
- 2008–2009: Pandurii Târgu Jiu (GK coach)
- 2009–2010: Astra Ploiești (GK coach)
- 2010: Universitatea Craiova (GK coach)
- 2010: CFR Cluj (GK coach)
- 2011: Universitatea Craiova (GK coach)
- 2011–2012: Astra Ploiești (GK coach)
- 2013–2016: CS Universitatea Craiova (GK coach)
- 2014: CS Universitatea Craiova (caretaker)
- 2016: Concordia Chiajna (GK coach)
- 2017–2018: Filiași
- 2020: Ceahlăul Piatra Neamț (GK coach)
- 2021–: Romania U20 (GK coach)
- * Club domestic league appearances and goals

Silviu Lung (Romanian pronunciation: [ˈsilvju luŋɡ]; born 9 September 1956) is a Romanian former professional footballer who played as a goalkeeper who currently serves as a goalkeeping coach for the Romania national under-20 team.

== Club career ==
=== Victoria Carei ===
Lung was born on 9 September 1956 in Sânmiclăuș, Satu Mare County, Romania. He started to play senior football in 1971 at Victoria Carei in Divizia C, being helped due to a rule imposed by the Romanian Football Federation requiring the use of a junior player in lower league games. During his time at Victoria, he helped the club achieve promotion to Divizia B.

=== Universitatea Craiova ===
Lung joined Universitatea Craiova, making his Divizia A debut on 29 August 1974 under coach Constantin Cernăianu in a 1–0 victory against Politehnica Timișoara. He spent 14 seasons with Universitatea, being part of the "Craiova Maxima" generation that won two consecutive league titles in 1980 and 1981. In the first one, coach Valentin Stănescu gave him only three appearances because he was diagnosed with hepatitis and in the second he played 20 games under the guidance of coach Ion Oblemenco. He also won the Cupa României four times, in the years 1977, 1978, 1981 and 1983, but played only in the latter final. Lung helped The Blue Lions reach the quarter-finals of the 1981–82 European Cup after eliminating Olympiacos and Kjøbenhavns Boldklub, being eliminated with 3–1 on aggregate by Bayern Munich. He was also an integral part of "U" Craiova's team that reached the 1982–83 UEFA Cup semi-finals where they lost to Benfica, making 10 appearances in the campaign. Lung won the Romanian Footballer of the Year in 1984 and in the same year he was nominated for the Ballon d'Or. Contributing six matches to the 1984–85 UEFA Cup run, he helped "U" navigate past Real Betis and Olympiacos before they ultimately fell to Željezničar in the round of 16. He kept a clean sheet in a 3–0 win over AS Monaco in the second leg of the first round of the 1985–86 European Cup Winners' Cup, after losing the first leg 2–0. However, they were eliminated in the following round by the eventual winners of the competition, Dynamo Kyiv.

=== Steaua București ===
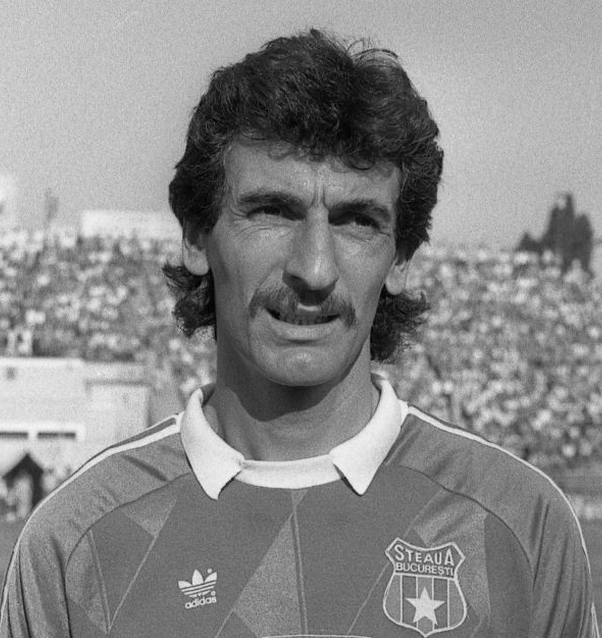
Lung during his stint at Steaua

In 1988, he joined Steaua București and won The Double in his first season with coach Anghel Iordănescu, appearing in 29 league matches and keeping a clean sheet in the 1–0 win over rivals Dinamo București in the Cupa României final. In the same season he helped the club reach the 1988–89 European Cup final, playing nine games in the campaign, including the final which was lost 4–0 to AC Milan. In the following season, Lung managed to not concede any goals for 736 consecutive minutes.

=== Logroñés ===
Afterwards, Lung went abroad to play for Spanish team Logroñés where he made his La Liga debut on 2 September 1990 under coach David Vidal in a 2–1 home loss to Mallorca. In his single season spent at the club, he played only nine league games, having suffered a knee injury.

=== Electroputere and Universitatea Craiova ===
In 1991, he returned to Romania, first at Electroputere Craiova, where he finished the 1991–92 season in third place. In the middle of the following season, Lung joined Universitatea Craiova, and under coach Marian Bondrea, secured a Cupa României victory by maintaining a clean sheet in the 2–0 win against Dacia Unirea Brăila in the final. He made his last Divizia A appearance on 24 October 1993 in "U" Craiova's 2–0 loss to FC Brașov, totaling 419 matches in the competition and 58 appearances in European competitions.

== International career ==
Lung played 76 games for Romania, making his debut under coach Ștefan Kovács on 21 March 1979 in a 3–0 friendly victory against Greece. His second game was a 2–2 draw against Spain in the Euro 1980 qualifiers.

His following appearance for the national team came after three and a half years of absence in a 0–0 draw against Italy during the successful Euro 1984 qualifiers in which he made a total of five appearances. Lung played two games under coach Mircea Lucescu during the final tournament in a 1–1 draw against Spain and a 2–1 loss to West Germany as Romania did not get past the group stage. He played seven games in the 1986 World Cup qualifiers and five during the Euro 1988 qualifiers.

Afterwards he played five matches in the successful 1990 World Cup qualifiers. Subsequently, he was used by coach Emerich Jenei as captain for the entirety of all four matches in the final tournament, where The Tricolours were eliminated by Ireland in the round of 16. Lung played four games in the Euro 1992 qualifiers and made his last appearance for the national team on 2 June 1993 in a 5–2 loss to Czechoslovakia during the 1994 World Cup qualifiers.

For representing his country at the 1990 World Cup, Lung was decorated by President of Romania Traian Băsescu on 25 March 2008 with the Ordinul "Meritul Sportiv" – (The Medal "The Sportive Merit") class III.

In 2022, the International Federation of Football History & Statistics (IFFHS) included Lung in its "Romania's all-time dream team" first XI.

== Managerial career ==
After retirement, Lung began his coaching career and for over 20 years he was the assistant coach or goalkeeping coach for clubs such as Universitatea Craiova, Național București, Nagoya Grampus, Pandurii Târgu Jiu, Astra Ploiești, CFR Cluj, CS Universitatea Craiova and Concordia Chiajna. Between 1995 and 1997 he was the head coach of Minerul Motru and earlier in 1994, of Olympique de Casablanca. Those were his only jobs as a head coach, until December 2017, when he was announced as the new head coach of Liga III side CSO Filiași.

== Personal life ==
Lung has two sons, Tiberiu and Silviu Jr., both of whom played as goalkeepers and represented Romania at international level.

In 2003, Lung received the Honorary Citizen of Craiova award.

In January 2014, he was involved in a car accident which killed the driver of the other vehicle, receiving a punishment of one year and four months suspended sentence.

== Playing statistics ==
Appearances and goals by national team and year
National team	Year	Apps	Goals
Romania	1979	2	0
Romania	1982	1	0
Romania	1983	12	0
Romania	1984	7	0
Romania	1985	9	0
Romania	1986	7	0
Romania	1987	9	0
Romania	1988	7	0
Romania	1989	7	0
Romania	1990	8	0
Romania	1991	5	0
Romania	1992	1	0
Romania	1993	1	0
Total		76	0

== Honours ==
=== Player ===
Victoria Carei

- Divizia C: 1971–72, 1972–73

Universitatea Craiova

- Divizia A: 1979–80, 1980–81
- Cupa României: 1976–77, 1977–78, 1980–81, 1982–83, 1992–93

Steaua București

- Divizia A: 1988–89
- Cupa României: 1988–89
- European Cup runner-up: 1988–89

Individual

- Romanian Footballer of the Year: 1984
- Ballon d'Or: 1984 (22nd place)
