= Adrian Ionescu (footballer, born 1958) =

Romanian footballer (born 1958)

Personal information
- Date of birth: 17 May 1958 (age 68)
- Place of birth: Bucharest, Romania
- Position: Forward

Youth career
- Steaua București

Senior career*
Years	Team	Apps	(Gls)
1976–1982	Steaua București	108	(18)
1985–1986	Mecanică Fină București		
1986–1987	Farul Constanța		

International career
1977–1979	Romania U21	8	(0)
1980	Romania	3	(1)

Managerial career
- Anticoroziv
- Midia Năvodari
- CSS Nucet
- * Club domestic league appearances and goals

Adrian Ionescu (born 17 May 1958) is a Romanian former football forward and coach.

== Club career ==
Ionescu was born on 17 May 1958 in Bucharest, Romania and began playing junior-level football at local club Steaua under the guidance of coach Nicolae Tătaru. In 1975 he won the national junior championship with Steaua, netting two goals in the 8–1 win in the final against FCM Bacău.

On 24 October 1976, at age 16, he made his Divizia A debut under coach Emerich Jenei in Steaua's 2–1 home win against Bihor Oradea. In the 1977–78 season, Ionescu helped the club win the title, netting one goal in the 17 matches that Jenei used him. In 1979 he won the Cupa României trophy, coach Gheorghe Constantin using him the full 90 minutes in the 3–0 win over Sportul Studențesc București in the final. In the 1979–80 season, Ionescu scored a personal record of 10 goals, including one in a 1–1 draw against rivals Dinamo București. He reached another Cupa României final in 1980, coach Gheorghe Constantin using him the entire match in the 2–1 loss to Politehnica Timișoara. In his six-season spell with The Military Men he also played seven matches in European competitions. Most notably getting past Young Boys with a 8–2 aggregate win in the first round of the 1979–80 European Cup Winners' Cup, being eliminated in the following one by Nantes against whom he scored once.

In 1981, while playing for Steaua in a match against Corvinul Hunedoara, Ionescu was hit by opponent Ioan Andone in the right knee which led to an anterior cruciate ligament injury that ended his professional career at age 23. In 1985 he tried to make a comeback, playing in the second league for Mecanică Fină București and Farul Constanța, but retired after two years. He made a total 108 Divizia A appearances with 18 goals netted, all of them for Steaua.

== International career ==
Between 1977 and 1979, Ionescu made eight appearances for Romania's under-21 squad.

He played three friendly games for Romania, making his debut on 18 May 1980 under coach Ștefan Kovács in a 2–1 loss against Czechoslovakia in which he scored his side's goal. His following games were a 2–1 loss to Belgium and a 2–1 victory against Bulgaria.

=== International goals ===
Scores and results list Romania's goal tally first. "Score" column indicates the score after each Adrian Ionescu goal.

#	Date	Venue	Opponent	Score	Result	Competition
1.	18 May 1980	Za Lužánkami Stadium, Brno, Czechoslovakia	Czechoslovakia	1–1	1–2	Friendly

== Managerial career ==
After he ended his playing career, Ionescu worked as a manager in the Romanian lower leagues for teams such as Anticoroziv, Midia Năvodari or CSS Nucet. He also had spells for teams in Bahrain and Saudi Arabia.

== Honours ==
Steaua București

- Divizia A: 1977–78
- Cupa României: 1978–79, runner-up 1976–77, 1979–80
