= 1980 Cupa României final =

- Event: 1979–80 Cupa României
Politehnica Timișoara	Steaua București
2	1
- Date: 1 June 1980
- Venue: 23 August, Bucharest
- Referee: Nicolae Rainea (Bârlad)

The 1980 Cupa României final was the 42nd final of Romania's most prestigious football cup competition. It was disputed between Politehnica Timișoara and Steaua București, and was won by Politehnica Timișoara after a game with 3 goals, in extra time. It was the second cup for Politehnica Timișoara.

== Match details ==
1 June 1980
16:30 EET

Politehnica Timișoara	2–1 (a.e.t.)	Steaua București
Vișan 43'; Păltinișanu 96'	Report	Stoica 76'

23 August, Bucharest
Attendance: 50,000
Referee: Nicolae Rainea (Bârlad)

GK	(Romania) Radu Suciu
DF	(Romania) Dumitru Nadu
DF	(Romania) Dan Păltinișanu
DF	(Romania) Gheorghe Șerbănoiu
DF	(Romania) Viorel Vișan
MF	(Romania) Adrian Manea
MF	(Romania) Emerich Dembrovschi
MF	(Romania) Titi Nicolae (substituted off) 61'
FW	(Romania) Stelian Anghel
FW	(Romania) Leonida Nedelcu (substituted off) 91'
FW	(Romania) Gheorghe Cotec
Substitutions:
FW	(Romania) Vasile Nucă (substituted in) 61'
MF	(Romania) Ion Octavian Roșca (substituted in) 91'
Manager:
(Romania) Ion V. Ionescu

GK	(Romania) Vasile Iordache
DF	(Romania) Teodor Anghelini
DF	(Romania) Florin Marin
DF	(Romania) Ștefan Sameș
DF	(Romania) Iosif Vigu
MF	(Romania) Marcel Răducanu (substituted off) 65'
MF	(Romania) Tudorel Stoica (substituted off) 75'
MF	(Romania) Ion Dumitru
MF	(Romania) Vasile Aelenei
FW	(Romania) Anghel Iordănescu
FW	(Romania) Adrian Ionescu
Substitutions:
FW	(Romania) Gabriel Zahiu (substituted in) 65'
DF	(Romania) Ion Nițu (substituted in) 75'
Manager:
(Romania) Gheorghe Constantin

== See also ==
- List of Cupa României finals
