= Nicolae Tilihoi =

Romanian footballer (1956–2018)

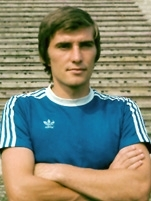
- Tilihoi with Universitatea Craiova in the 1980s

Personal information
- Date of birth: 9 December 1956
- Place of birth: Brăila, Romania
- Date of death: 25 March 2018 (aged 61)
- Place of death: Craiova, Romania
- Position: Defender

Youth career
- Comerțul Brăila

Senior career*
| Years | Team | Apps | (Gls) |
| 1974–1976 | FC Brăila | | |
| 1976–1987 | Universitatea Craiova | 290 | (6) |
| 1987–1988 | Metalul Bocșa | | |
| Total | | 290 | (6) |

International career^{‡}
| 1976–1977 | Romania U21 | 10 | (0) |
| 1980 | Romania Olympic | 1 | (0) |
| 1979–1981 | Romania | 9 | (0) |

Managerial career
- 1990–1991: Jiul Craiova
- 1991–1992: Electroputere Craiova (assistant)
- 1993: Electroputere Craiova
- 1996–1997: Universitatea Craiova (juniors)
- 1996: Universitatea Craiova (assistant)
- 2003: Senaco Novaci
- Metalul Bocșa
- Chimia Râmnicu Vâlcea
- Callatis Mangalia
- Drobeta-Turnu Severin
- * Club domestic league appearances and goals as of 10 March 2018 ‡ National team caps and goals as of 10 March 2018

Nicolae Tilihoi (9 December 1956 – 25 March 2018) was a Romanian professional footballer who played as a defender.

He spent most of his career with Universitatea Craiova, where he was a member of the Craiova Maxima generation, being nicknamed "the Iron Defender of Craiova".

== Club career ==
Tilihoi was born on 9 December 1956 in Brăila, Romania and began playing junior-level football in 1969 at local club Comerțul. He started his senior career in 1974, playing for FC Brăila in Diviza B. Subsequently, he joined Universitatea Craiova where he made his Diviza A debut on 1 September 1976 under coach Constantin Teașcă in a 1–0 away loss to Politehnica Timișoara.

Tilihoi went on to play 11 seasons for "U" Craiova, forming a successful partnership in the central defense with Costică Ștefănescu. He was part of the "Craiova Maxima" generation, helping them win two consecutive league titles in 1980 and 1981. At the first one he played 23 matches under coach Valentin Stănescu and in the second he made 27 appearances under coach Ion Oblemenco. He also won the Cupa României four times, playing in all the finals.

Tilihoi played 37 games for "U" Craiova in European competitions. In the second round of the 1979–80 UEFA Cup, he played in one leg of the 4–0 aggregate win over Leeds United, as Universitatea became the first Romanian club that eliminated a team from England in European competitions. Afterwards, they reached the quarter-finals in the 1981–82 European Cup by eliminating Olympiacos and Kjøbenhavns Boldklub, being eliminated with 3–1 on aggregate by Bayern Munich. He made nine appearances in the 1982–83 UEFA Cup campaign when they reached the semi-finals, being eliminated by Benfica on the away goal rule after 1–1 on aggregate. Contributing four matches to the 1984–85 UEFA Cup run, he helped "U" get past Olympiacos before they ultimately fell to Željezničar in the round of 16. Tilihoi played in a 3–0 win over AS Monaco in the second leg of the first round of the 1985–86 European Cup Winners' Cup, after losing the first leg 2–0. However, they were eliminated in the following round by the eventual winners of the competition, Dynamo Kyiv. Tilihoi made his last Divizia A appearance on 3 June 1987 in a 3–2 home win over Victoria București, totaling 290 matches with six goals in the competition.

He ended his career in 1988, having spent one year with Metalul Bocșa.

== International career ==
From 1976 to 1977, Tilihoi was consistently featured for Romania's under-21 side. In 1980, he played for Romania's Olympic team in a 2–2 draw against Hungary.

Tilihoi made nine appearances for Romania, making his debut on 21 March 1979 under coach Ștefan Kovács in a 3–0 friendly win over Greece. Subsequently, he played in a loss to Yugoslavia and a win over Cyprus during the Euro 1980 qualifiers. He also played in a 2–0 loss to Yugoslavia in the 1977–80 Balkan Cup. Tilihoi made his last appearance for the national team on 13 May 1981 in a 1–0 away loss to rivals Hungary in the 1982 World Cup qualifiers.

== Managerial career ==
After retirement, Tilihoi started coaching in 1990 at Jiul Craiova, helping it gain promotion from Diviza C to Diviza B. Subsequently, he was an assistant coach at Electroputere Craiova during the 1991–92 Divizia A season, as the team finished in third place. He then became the head coach of the team in 1993 for three matches. In 1996, Tilihoi went to coach juniors at Universitatea Craiova and with them, he won a national junior championship. In the same year, he worked for a while as the assistant of Emerich Jenei for the senior team. He also coached several other clubs, such as Metalul Bocșa, Chimia Râmnicu Vâlcea, Callatis Mangalia, Drobeta-Turnu Severin and Senaco Novaci. In 2003, Tilihoi worked as a vice-president for Electro Craiova.

== Writing ==
Tilihoi wrote editorials in the regional newspaper "Gazeta de Sud" from 2005 to 2011. In 2011, he published a book comprising those editorials, titled Cronicar in vremuri tulburi (Chronicler in troubled times).

== Personal life and death ==
In 2003, Tilihoi received the Honorary Citizen of Craiova title.

Tilihoi died early in the morning of 25 March 2018, at the age of 61, after struggling for several years with an incurable disease. Around 300 people attended his funeral, which took place in the "Ungureni" Cemetery in Craiova.

== Honours ==
=== Player ===
Universitatea Craiova

- Diviza A: 1979–80, 1980–81
- Cupa României: 1976–77, 1977–78, 1980–81, 1982–83

=== Manager ===
Jiul Craiova

- Diviza C: 1990–91
