= Laurențiu Bozeșan =

Romanian footballer

Personal information
- Full name: Laurențiu Augustin Bozeșan
- Date of birth: 22 November 1959
- Place of birth: Târnăveni, Romania
- Date of death: 8 October 1998 (aged 38)
- Place of death: Germany
- Position: Left midfielder

Youth career
- 1974–1977: Chimica Târnăveni

Senior career*
Years	Team	Apps	(Gls)
1977–1978	Chimica Târnăveni		
1978–1980	ASA Târgu Mureș	60	(7)
1980–1982	Sportul Studențesc	31	(1)
1982–1984	Politehnica Timișoara	51	(20)
1984–1987	Sportul Studențesc	100	(19)
1988	Rapid București	12	(1)
1989–1990	Progresul Timișoara		
- Alemania Müllheim
- TSV Sickenhausen
Total		254	(48)

International career
1984–1985	Romania	3	(0)
- * Club domestic league appearances and goals

Laurențiu Augustin Bozeșan (22 November 1959 – 8 October 1998) was a Romanian footballer who played as a midfielder. He died at age 38 after he lost control of his truck and fell into an abyss in Germany. His brother, Claudiu was also a footballer who played for Politehnica Timișoara in the Romanian top-division, Divizia A.

== International career ==
Laurențiu Bozeșan played three friendly games at international level for Romania. He made his debut when coach Mircea Lucescu sent him on the field in the 55th minute in order to replace Michael Klein in a 1–1 against Israel. His following two games were a 3–2 away win with Portugal and a 0–0 with Poland.

== Honours ==
=== Club ===
Politehnica Timișoara

- Divizia B: 1983–84
