= Câmpulung la Tisa =

Câmpulung la Tisa Hosszúmező
- Commune
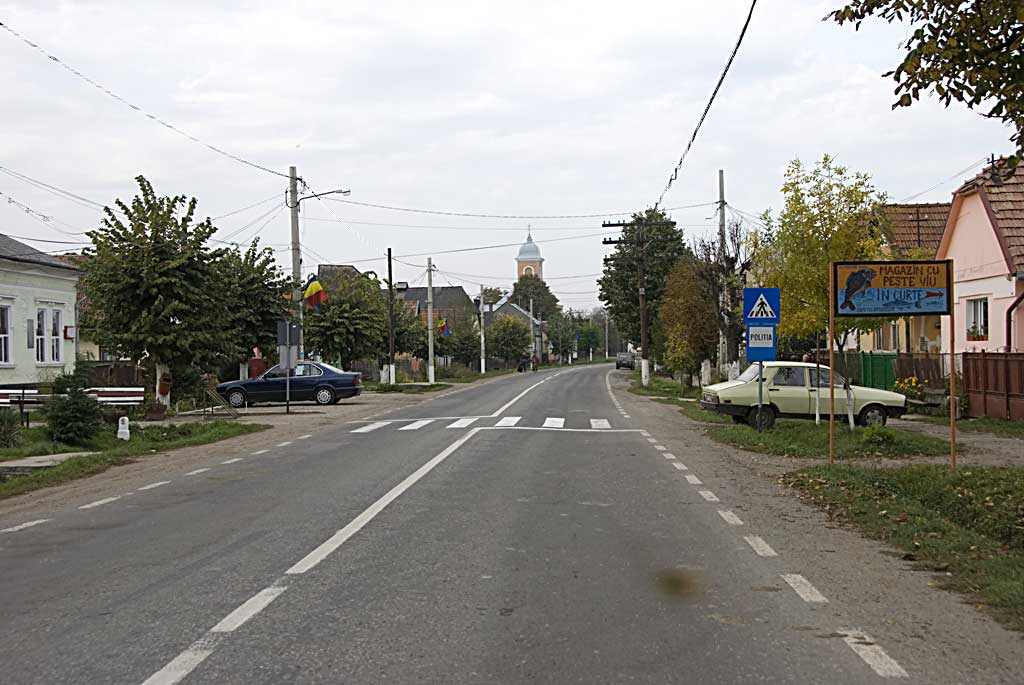

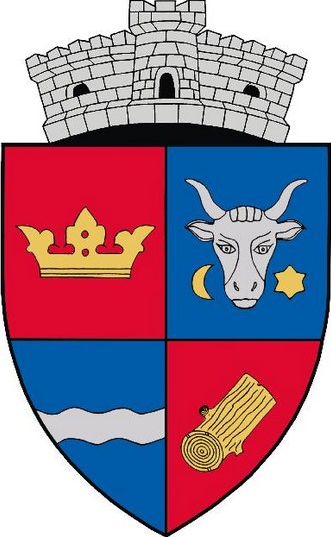
- Coat of arms

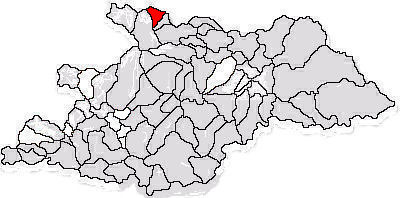
- Location in Maramureș County

- Location in Romania
- Coordinates: 47.985°N 23.7658°E
- Country: Romania
- County: Maramureș

Government
  - Mayor (2020–2024): Ludovic R-Fekete (UDMR)
- Area: 29.87 km^{2} (11.53 sq mi)
- Elevation: 280 m (920 ft)
- Population (2021-12-01): 2,308
  - Density: 77.27/km^{2} (200.1/sq mi)
- Time zone: UTC+02:00 (EET)
  - Summer (DST): UTC+03:00 (EEST)
- Postal code: 437080
- Area code: (+40) 02 62
- Vehicle reg.: MM
- Website: www.campulunglatisa.ro

Câmpulung la Tisa (Hungarian: Hosszúmező; Ukrainian: Довге Поле, Rusyn: Довгоє Поле, Yiddish: דעפאליע, romanized: Depolya, German: Langenfeld) is a commune in Maramureș County, Maramureș, Romania. It is composed of a single village, Câmpulung la Tisa.

== Geography ==
The commune lies on the left bank of the river Tisza, on the border with Ukraine, across from the village of Hrushovo. To the southwest is Piatra Săpânței Peak (941 m (3,087 ft)), in the Oaș Mountains.

Câmpulung la Tisa is located in the northern part of the county, 13 km (8.1 mi) northwest of Sighetu Marmației and 76 km (47 mi) north of the county seat, Baia Mare. It is traversed by national road DN19, which runs from Oradea to Sighetu Marmației.

== Demographics ==
Historical population
Year	Pop.	±%
1880	1,759	—
1900	2,350	+33.6%
1910	2,588	+10.1%
1930	2,831	+9.4%
1956	2,872	+1.4%
1977	2,914	+1.5%
1992	2,498	−14.3%
2002	2,484	−0.6%
2011	2,485	+0.0%
2021	2,308	−7.1%
Source: Census data

At the 2021 census, the commune had a population of 2,308, of which 76.7% were Hungarians, 17.8% Romanians, and 2.3% Roma. At the 2011 census, there were 2,485 inhabitants; of those, 71.4% were Hungarians, 23.7% Romanians, 3.9% Roma, and 0.9% Ukrainians. At the 2002 census, 44.6% were Reformed, 22.3% Romanian Orthodox, 14.2% Greek-Catholic, 12.6% Roman Catholic, and 1.7% Adventist.

== Natives ==
Câmpulung la Tisa is the birthplace of the former Romanian football player Emerich Dembrovschi, who scored a goal against Pelé's Brazil at the 1970 FIFA World Cup.
