= Iulian Pop (footballer) =

Romanian footballer

Personal information
- Date of birth: 14 May 1907
- Position: Defender

Senior career*
Years	Team	Apps	(Gls)
1928–1930	Politehnica Timișoara		

International career
1929	Romania	1	(0)
- * Club domestic league appearances and goals

Iulian Pop (born 14 May 1907, date of death unknown) was a Romanian footballer. He was the first footballer of Politehnica Timișoara that played for Romania's national team.

== International career ==
Iulian Pop played one friendly match for Romania, on 15 September 1929 under coach Constantin Rădulescu in a 3–2 away victory against Bulgaria.
