= Aurel Șunda =

Romanian footballer and manager

Personal information
- Date of birth: 14 October 1957 (age 69)
- Place of birth: Becicherecu Mic, Romania
- Height: 1.78 m (5 ft 10 in)
- Position: Defender

Youth career
- Politehnica Timișoara

Senior career*
Years	Team	Apps	(Gls)
1975–1976	Politehnica Timișoara		
1976–1979	CFR Timișoara	66	(1)
1979–1987	Politehnica Timișoara	218	(10)
1988–1990	Progresul Timișoara	49	(3)
1990–1991	UM Timișoara		
Total		333	(14)

Managerial career
- 1991–1994: UM Timișoara
- 1994–1996: Politehnica Timișoara (assistant)
- 1996–1997: Politehnica Timișoara
- 1998: CSM Reșița (assistant)
- 1998: CSM Reșița (caretaker)
- 1998–1999: CSM Reșița (assistant)
- 1999–2001: UM Timișoara
- 2001–2003: Apulum Alba Iulia
- 2003: Minaur Zlatna
- 2003: Apulum Alba Iulia
- 2003–2005: CFR Cluj
- 2005: Oțelul Galați
- 2006: Jiul Petroșani
- 2006–2007: FC Brașov
- 2007: FC Precizia Săcele
- 2007: Ceahlăul Piatra Neamț
- 2007–2009: Unirea Alba Iulia
- 2009–2011: Săgeata Stejaru
- 2011–2012: Hunedoara
- 2012–2013: Săgeata Năvodari
- 2013–2014: ACS Poli Timișoara
- 2018: ACS Poli Timișoara (technical director)
- * Club domestic league appearances and goals

Aurel Șunda (born 14 October 1957) is a Romanian former footballer and manager. As a footballer, Șunda played mainly as a defender for Politehnica Timișoara, club for which he played in more than 200 matches. In fact, as a player, Șunda never left Timișoara, also playing for other local teams such as CFR Timișoara, Progresul Timișoara or UM Timișoara.

He retired in 1991 and started a career as a football manager at his last club where he played, UM Timișoara. In the 1990s Șunda remained in Banat as a manager and/ or assistant coach of Politehnica Timișoara, CSM Reșița or UM Timișoara. Former UMT player promoted the team in the top-flight, in 2000, for the first time in the history of "the zebras". In the 2000s Șunda was a globetrotter, managing 12 clubs, but with very good results at Unirea Alba Iulia and CFR Cluj, periods in which he received his nickname "the Professor". After 2010, Șunda was the manager of FC Hunedoara and Săgeata Năvodari, just to return at his great love, Politehnica Timișoara, now represented by one of its successors, ACS Poli Timișoara. He was sacked five months later, in March 2014, subsequently working as a youth center manager of the club.

Șunda is an ethnic Aromanian.

== Achievements ==
=== Player ===
Politehnica Timișoara

- Romanian Cup (1): 1979–80
- Divizia B (2): 1983–84, 1986–87

UM Timișoara

- Divizia C (1): 1990–91

=== Manager ===
UM Timișoara

- Divizia B (1): 2000–01

Unirea Alba Iulia

- Divizia B (1): 2002–03

CFR Cluj

- Divizia B (1): 2003–04
