= Emerich Dembrovschi =

Romanian footballer

Emeric Dembrovschi
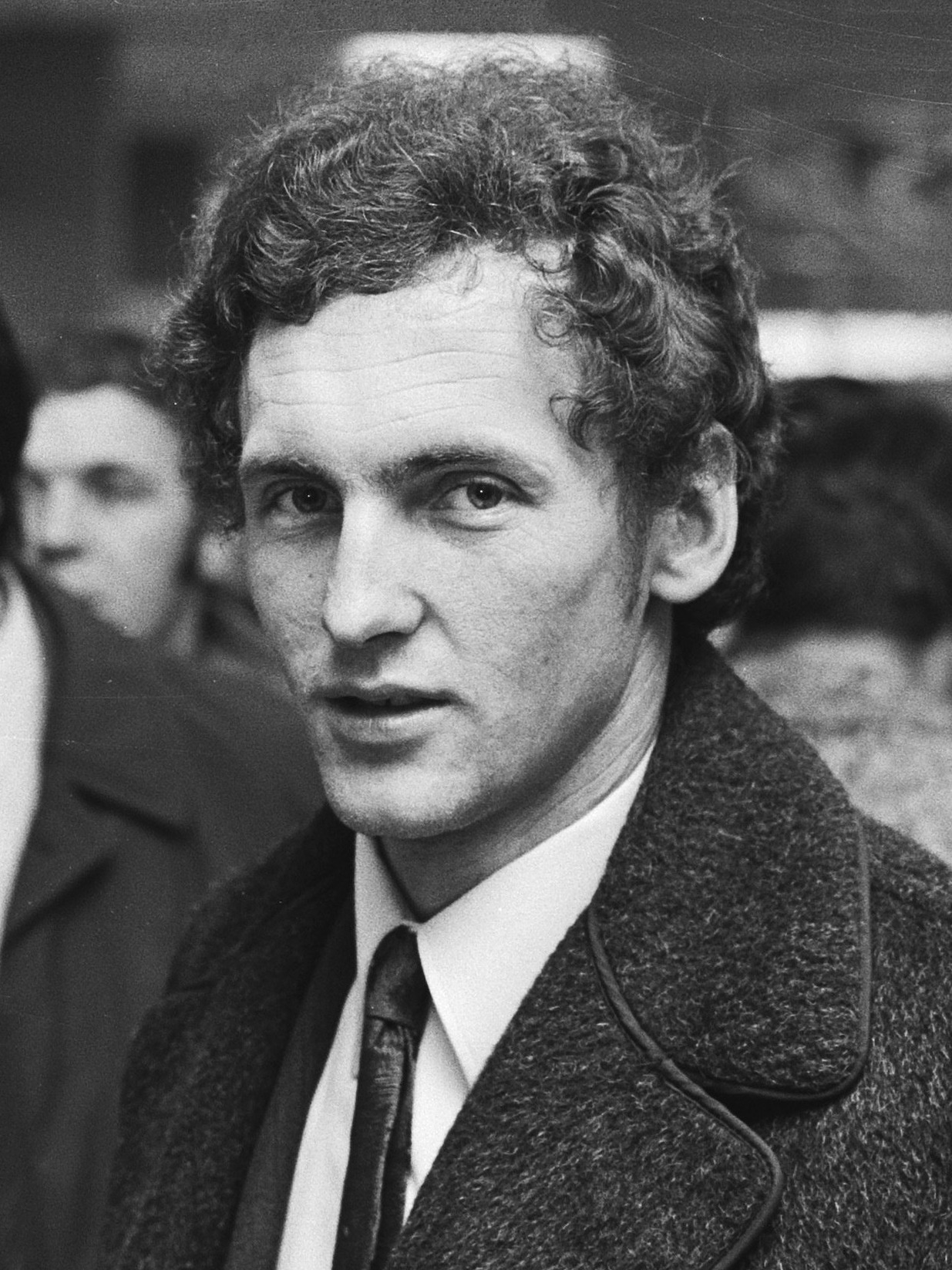
- Dembrovschi in 1970

Personal information
- Date of birth: 6 October 1945 (age 81)
- Place of birth: Câmpulung la Tisa, Romania
- Height: 1.78 m (5 ft 10 in)
- Position: Striker

Senior career*
| Years | Team | Apps | (Gls) |
| 1962–1965 | Foresta Sighet | | |
| 1965–1966 | Victoria Roman | | |
| 1967–1974 | SC Bacău | 190 | (63) |
| 1974–1981 | Politehnica Timișoara | 208 | (51) |
| Total | | 398 | (114) |

International career
| 1968–1973 | Romania (Note: Including one appearance and one goal for Romania's Olympic team.) | 27 | (9) |

Managerial career
- 1983–1985: Politehnica Timișoara
- 1996–1997: Politehnica Timișoara
- 1997: UTA Arad
- * Club domestic league appearances and goals

Emeric Dembroschi (born 6 October 1945) is a retired Romanian football striker.

== Club career ==
"He was neither graceful nor spectacular. He was, instead, one of the players who, it can be said without mistake, knows how to stay on the field. Dembo belonged to the category of strategic players, like Gérson, Didi, Bobby Charlton, Overath"

— Mircea Lucescu, former teammate

Dembrovschi was born on 6 October 1945 in Câmpulung la Tisa, Romania and began playing football in the Romanian lower leagues at Foresta Sighet and Victoria Roman. In 1967 he was transferred to SC Bacău where he was wanted by coach Constantin Teașcă. He helped the team get promoted in Divizia A, a competition where he made his debut on 20 August 1967 under coach Nicolae Dumitru in a 2–1 victory against Steaua București in which he scored a goal. Dembrovschi participated in SC Bacău's 1969–70 Inter-Cities Fairs Cup campaign, playing seven games, scoring a hat-trick against Floriana and a brace against Skeid, helping the club reach the quarter-finals where they were eliminated by the eventual champion Arsenal.

In 1974, Dembrovschi went to Politehnica Timișoara where he won the 1979–80 Cupa României, being used by coach Ion Ionescu the entire match in the 2–1 win over Steaua București in the final. In the following season he helped them eliminate Celtic in the 1980–81 European Cup Winners' Cup and reached another Cupa României final where Ionescu used him as a starter in the 6–0 loss to Universitatea Craiova. Dembrovschi made his last Divizia A appearance on 17 June 1981, playing in Politehnica's 1–1 draw against Chimia Râmnicu Vâlcea, totaling 385 appearances with 108 goals in the competition and 15 matches with five goals in European competitions (including seven appearances with five goals in the Inter-Cities Fairs Cup). Among these goals, two were scored in the West derby against UTA Arad, contributing to two victories for Politehnica.

== International career ==
Dembrovschi played 26 matches and scored eight goals for Romania, making his debut on 27 October 1968 under coach Angelo Niculescu in a 3–0 loss to Portugal in the 1970 World Cup qualifiers. He made a total of six appearances in these qualifiers, scoring a goal in a 1–1 draw against Greece. He was used in the final tournament by Niculescu for the entirety of all three games which were a win against Czechoslovakia and losses to England and Brazil, scoring once against the latter, as his side failed to progress from their group. For his performances at the Mexican World Cup, Dembrovschi was declared Romania's best player. He and the other 15 best players from the other national teams were part of a project that entailed each of them having a statue near the Estadio Azteca, a project that was ultimately never fulfilled. However, a wooden statue of him was displayed in his native Câmpulung la Tisa. He played six matches and scored two goals in the 1972 Euro qualifiers, managing to reach the quarter-finals where Romania was defeated by Hungary, who advanced to the final tournament. Dembrovschi played his last two national team games in the 1974 World Cup qualifiers, scoring a goal in the first, a 2–0 win against Albania. His last appearance took place on 26 September 1973 in a 2–0 loss to East Germany.

For representing his country in the 1970 World Cup, Dembrovschi was decorated by President of Romania Traian Băsescu on 25 March 2008 with the Ordinul "Meritul Sportiv" – (The Medal "The Sportive Merit") class III.

=== International goals ===
Score column indicates score after each Dembrovschi goal.

List of international goals scored by Emerich Dembrovschi
| # | Date | Venue | Opponent | Score | Result | Competition |
|---|---|---|---|---|---|---|
| 1. | 3 September 1969 | JNA Stadium, Belgrade, Yugoslavia | Yugoslavia | 0–1 | 1–1 | Friendly |
| 2. | 16 November 1969 | 23 August Stadium, Bucharest, Romania | Greece | 1–0 | 1–1 | 1970 World Cup qualifiers |
| 3. | 10 June 1970 | Estadio Jalisco, Guadalajara, Mexico | Brazil | 2–3 | 2–3 | 1970 World Cup |
| 4. | 21 April 1971 | Vojvodina Stadium, Novi Sad, Yugoslavia | Yugoslavia | 0–1 | 0–1 | Friendly |
| 5. | 22 September 1971 | Olympic Stadium, Helsinki, Finland | Finland | 0–3 | 0–4 | 1972 Euro qualifiers |
| 6. | 14 November 1971 | 23 August Stadium, Bucharest, Romania | Czechoslovakia | 1–0 | 2–1 | 1972 Euro qualifiers |
| 7. | 3 September 1972 | Stadionul Central, Craiova, Romania | Austria | 1–1 | 1–1 | Friendly |
| 8. | 29 October 1972 | 23 August Stadium, Bucharest, Romania | Albania | 2–0 | 2–0 | 1974 World Cup qualifiers |

== Personal life ==
Ilie Dobre wrote a book about him, titled Emeric Dembroschi - eroul de la Guadalajara (Emeric Dembroschi - The hero from Guadalajara).

== Honours ==
SC Bacău

- Divizia B: 1966–67

Politehnica Timișoara

- Cupa României: 1979–80, runner-up 1980–81
