= Nicolae Proca =

Moldovan politician (1949–2026)

Nicolae Proca (16 December 1949 – 31 March 2026) was a Moldovan politician.

== Life and career ==
Proca was born in Hădărăuți on 16 December 1949. He was one of the 278 signatories of the Declaration of Independence of the Republic of Moldova of 27 August 1991. He served as a deputy (1990–1994).

Proca died 31 March 2026, at the age of 77.
