= Constantin Rădulescu (footballer, born 1934) =

Romanian footballer and manager

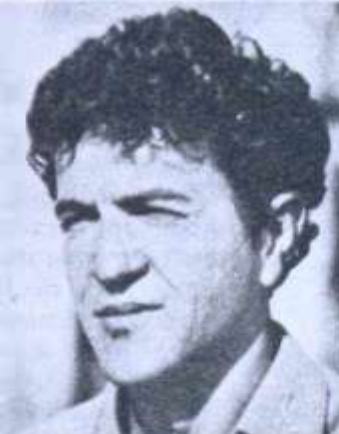
- Rădulescu in 1972

Personal information
- Date of birth: 17 April 1934
- Place of birth: Comarnic, Romania
- Date of death: 8 July 2002 (aged 68)
- Place of death: Timișoara, Romania
- Position: Midfielder

Senior career*
Years	Team	Apps	(Gls)
1948–1949	Vulturii Comarnic		
1950–1958	Dinamo Brașov/Cluj		
1959–1966	Dinamo Bacău		

Managerial career
- 1966–1967: Dinamo Bacău
- 1969–1974: Dinamo Bacău
- 1974–1975: CS Botoșani
- 1975–1977: Politehnica Timișoara
- 1977–1979: Politehnica Timișoara (assistant)
- 1979: Politehnica Timișoara
- 1979–1980: UM Timișoara
- 1980–1982: CSM Suceava
- 1982–1983: CS Târgoviște
- 1983–1984: SC Bacău
- 1984–1988: Oțelul Galați
- 1988–1991: Politehnica Timișoara
- 1991–1992: Farul Constanța
- 1993–1994: Vega Caransebeș
- 1994–1996: Politehnica Timișoara
- 1998–1999: UM Timișoara
- * Club domestic league appearances and goals as of 9 April 2023

Constantin "Costică" Rădulescu (17 April 1934 – 8 July 2002) was a Romanian footballer and manager.

== Playing career ==
Rădulescu was born on 17 April 1934 in Comarnic, Romania and began playing football in 1948 at local club Vulturii. In 1949 he moved to Dinamo Brașov, where he stayed until 1958, with the team playing in Cluj during his final year. He then signed with Dinamo Bacău, a team for which he would play the rest of his career, ending in 1966. In his last game, Rădulescu scored a hat-trick against Chimia Râmnicu Vâlcea, but he did not finish the match on the field due to suffering a concussion. Even though he was a fan of Rapid București, he never got to play for them.

== Managerial career ==
Rădulescu started his coaching career at Dinamo Bacău in 1966 at the request of his former coach, Constantin Teașcă, who left the team, managing to gain promotion from Divizia B to Divizia A in his first year. He and Valeriu Neagu led them in the 1969–70 Inter-Cities Fairs Cup campaign where they eliminated Floriana, Skeid and Kilmarnock, reaching the quarter-finals, being defeated by Arsenal who eventually won the competition. In 1974, during a match against Dinamo București, a general brawl ensued in which Rădulescu hit Dinamo's president Paul Moga who had previously cursed him. Following that scandal, eight players were suspended, and Rădulescu was forbidden to coach any Divizia A or Divizia B team for three years. Thus, he took over the Divizia C club CS Botoșani where General Marin Dragnea promised him that he would lift his suspension if he gained promotion to Divizia B which he achieved.

In 1975, Rădulescu went to coach Politehnica Timișoara, finishing the first season in fifth place. Subsequently, from 1977 until 1979 he worked as Angelo Niculescu's assistant, being close to winning the championship in the 1977–78 season, but eventually finished in third position. After Niculescu left the club, he worked again as head coach, but got replaced after 15 rounds with Ion "Jackie" Ionescu. In the following years, Rădulescu coached UM Timișoara, CSM Suceava, CS Târgoviște and SC Bacău before arriving at Oțelul Galați in 1984 where he stayed for four years. There, he gained a first-ever promotion to the first league at the end of the 1985–86 season. Afterwards, they earned a fourth place in the 1987–88 season, which granted the team the qualification to the 1988–89 UEFA Cup, where they were eliminated in the first round by Juventus. However, before the double against the Italians he was replaced by Cornel Dinu. Rădulescu returned to Politehnica Timișoara in 1988 which was playing in Divizia B, earning promotion after one year. They finished the next season in fifth place and earned a spot in the 1990–91 UEFA Cup where they eliminated Atlético Madrid with 2–1 on aggregate in the first round, being eliminated in the next round by Sporting Lisbon. He left Politehnica in 1991 after a conflict with the players who were unsatisfied with his training methods. However, after two spells at Farul Constanța and Vega Caransebeș he returned to Politehnica, which was again in Divizia B. He got them promoted after one season by finishing 14 points ahead of the second-place team, Corvinul Hunedoara. In the 1995–96 Divizia A season he started the championship well, including earning a 9–1 victory in the fifth round against Politehnica Iași, but the following results were poorer and eventually he was dismissed.

Rădulescu's last spell as coach was at UM Timișoara which he helped get promoted from Divizia C to Divizia B at the end of the 1998–99 season. He also led them in the 1998–99 Cupa României campaign where they eliminated Divizia A teams Astra Ploiești and Național București, reaching the quarter-finals where they were defeated by Dinamo București. During this period Rădulescu told his players his most famous quote regarding their football careers:"Everything passes, money passes, but these...these you should tell them to your children and grandchildren". Before a Divizia B game against UTA Arad he got a call from someone who told him that four or five of his players were bribed to lose the game, which ended with a 5–0 loss and he resigned from UM Timișoara. Afterwards he ended his career in which he has a total of 426 matches as a coach in Divizia A, consisting of 176 victories, 82 draws and 168 losses.

== Death ==
Rădulescu died on 8 July 2002 at age 68 in Timișoara after suffering from peritonitis.

In October 2019 a street in Timișoara was named after him.

== Honours ==
=== Manager ===
Dinamo Bacău

- Divizia B: 1966–67

CS Botoșani

- Divizia C: 1974–75

Politehnica Timișoara

- Divizia B: 1988–89, 1994–95

Oțelul Galați

- Divizia B: 1985–86

UM Timișoara

- Divizia C: 1998–99
