= Sorin Cârțu =

Romanian footballer and coach

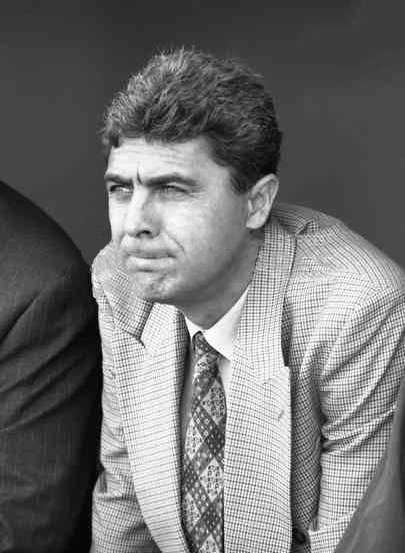
- Cârțu in 1995

Personal information
- Date of birth: 12 November 1955 (age 70)
- Place of birth: Cornu, Romania
- Height: 1.82 m (6 ft 0 in)
- Position: Striker

Team information
- Current team: Universitatea Craiova (honorary president)

Youth career
- 1968–1973: CSȘ Craiova
- 1973–1974: Universitatea Craiova

Senior career*
Years	Team	Apps	(Gls)
1973–1989	Universitatea Craiova	283	(107)
1974–1976	→ Electroputere Craiova (loan)	51	(16)
1987–1988	→ Electroputere Craiova (loan)	31	(11)
Total		365	(134)

International career
1979–1983	Romania	7	(0)

Managerial career
- 1987–1988: Electroputere Craiova (player/coach)
- 1988–1992: CS Universitatea Craiova
- 1993: Electroputere Craiova
- 1993–1994: Romania U21
- 1995: Rapid București
- 1995–1996: FC Universitatea Craiova
- 1997: Electroputere Craiova
- 1997: Veria
- 1998–2002: Extensiv Craiova
- 2002–2003: FC Universitatea Craiova
- 2004: Oţelul Galaţi
- 2005–2006: Argeş Piteşti
- 2006: Politehnica Timişoara
- 2006–2007: Național București
- 2007–2008: Dacia Mioveni
- 2008–2009: Pandurii Târgu Jiu
- 2010: Pandurii Târgu Jiu
- 2010: CFR Cluj
- 2011: Steaua București
- 2012: ALRO Slatina
- 2012: FC Brașov
- 2013: CSMS Iași
- 2014–2019: CS Universitatea Craiova (technical director)
- 2019–2023: CS Universitatea Craiova (president)
- 2024–: CS Universitatea Craiova (honorary president)
- * Club domestic league appearances and goals

Sorin Cârțu (born 12 November 1955) is a former football striker and football coach, currently honorary president at Liga I club Universitatea Craiova.

Cârțu won two Romanian Championships and four Romanian Cups with Universitatea Craiova. As a coach, he succeeded to win in the 1990–91 season with Universitatea Craiova both trophies in Romania, Divizia A and the Romanian Cup.

During CFR's Champions League tie against Swiss Super League champions FC Basel at St. Jakob-Park, Cârțu destroyed a section of the dugout with his foot after his side conceded a 75th-minute goal. After the match, CFR Cluj sacked Cârțu, citing his behaviour in the game as the reason behind his dismissal.

== International stats ==
Romania
Year	Apps	Goals
1979	2	0
1980	0	0
1981	0	0
1982	2	0
1983	3	0
Total	7	0

== Honours ==
=== Player ===
Universitatea Craiova

- Divizia A: 1979–80, 1980–81
- Cupa României: 1976–77, 1977–78, 1980–81, 1982–83

=== Manager ===
Universitatea Craiova

- Divizia A: 1990–91
- Cupa României: 1990–91

Rapid București

- Cupa României runner-up: 1994–95

Extensiv Craiova

- Divizia B: 1998–99

Oțelul Galați

- Cupa României runner-up: 2003–04

== Career statistics ==
- Divizia A: 283 games – 107 goals
- Divizia B: 82 games – 27 goals
