= CSP UM Timișoara =

Romanian football club

- Full name: Clubul Sportiv Profesionist UM Timișoara
- Nicknames: Mecanicii (The Mechanics); Alb-negrii (White and Blacks); Zebrele (The Zebras)
- Short name: UMT
- Founded: 1960
- Dissolved: 2008
- Ground: UMT
- Capacity: 9,900
Home colours	Away colours

Clubul Sportiv Profesionist UM Timișoara, commonly known as UM Timișoara or simply UMT, was a Romanian professional football team from Timișoara, Timiș County, founded in 1960 and dissolved in 2008. Although it did not achieve major success during its existence, UMT managed to compete for one season in the Romanian top flight.

== History ==
The football team of Uzinele Mecanice Timișoara (lit. 'Timișoara Mechanical Plants ') was founded in 1958 as Vulturii Timișoara through the merger of the Atelierele CFR and IMB teams. In 1960, the team became part of the newly established economic unit UMT, from which it adopted its name. In its early years, the Mechanics played in the Ronaț neighborhood on the field that would later become the Gheorghe Rășcanu Stadium.

UMT were promoted to the Timișoara Municipal Championship in 1961 and earned promotion to the Banat Regional Championship three years later, following a play-off tournament. In the 1965–66 season, the Mechanics finished 3rd in the North Series of the Banat Regional Championship, laying the groundwork for the success of the following campaign. In the 1966–67 season, UMT finished 1st in the North Series and defeated Dinamo Timișoara in a two-legged tie, winning both matches 1–0 to claim the Banat Regional Championship. They then secured promotion to Divizia C by overcoming Aurul Brad, the winner of the Hunedoara Regional Championship, despite a 1–0 away defeat and a 2–0 home victory.

In Divizia C, the Mechanics finished 6th in the West Series in 1967–68 and 3rd in Series V in 1968–69. In the 1969–70 season, under the guidance of Iosif Varga Lipoczi, the Mechanics topped Series V and earned promotion to Divizia B by winning the promotion play-off Group II held in Arad. The squad that season included Sziklay, Tunea, Codreanu, Cotormani, Vincze, Enderle, Kukla, Popescu, Laurențiu, Iancu, Covaci, Pop, Strizu, Mihu, Lață, Sețu, and Andea.

In the 1970s, the Mechanics moved to UMT Stadium, then known as Progresul Stadium. Their first spell in Divizia B, during the 1970–71 season under head coach Costică Toma, ended with a 15th-place finish, resulting in relegation back to Divizia C. After two strong seasons in Series VIII of the third division, including a 3rd-place finish in 1971–72 and a runner-up finish in 1972–73, the Mechanics returned to Divizia B.

Over the next decade, the White and Blacks remained a stable presence in Series III of the second tier. They achieved their best result in the 1973–74 season with a 3rd-place finish and then maintaining mid-table positions, 9th in 1974–75, 8th in 1975–76 and 1976–77 under Iosif Lereter, followed by another 8th place in 1977–78 under Cicerone Manolache, 10th in 1978–79, and 11th in 1979–80 with Constantin Rădulescu on the bench. Through the early 1980s, rankings fluctuated, with 13th in 1980–81 under Petre Speriosu, 7th in 1981–82, and after a 16th-place finish in 1982–83 under Petre Mehedințu, the Mechanics were relegated to the third division.

In the following seasons of Divizia C, UMT competed in Series VIII, finishing as runners-up in 1983–84, 9th in 1984–85, 5th in 1985–86, and dropping to the lower part of the table with 14th in 1986–87 and 13th in 1987–88. The Mechanics returned to success in the late 1980s and early 1990s, ranking 4th in Series IX in both 1988–89 and 1990–91, and winning Series XII of Divizia C in 1990–91 to return to Divizia B, although they suffered relegation after a 15th-place finish in Series II in 1991–92 under Aurel Șunda.

Over the next seasons, the Mechanics competed in Series IV of the third division, finishing 14th in 1992–93 and 13th in 1993–94, gradually rebuilding their form with a 9th-place finish in Series III in 1994–95, followed by 4th in Series IV in 1995–96. They earned promotion to Divizia B by winning Series IV in 1996–97 but were quickly relegated after finishing 17th in Series II of Divizia B in 1997–98. The Mechanics bounced back after winning Series IV in 1998–99 under Constantin Rădulescu. Aurel Șunda returned to manage the team, during which the White and Blacks stabilized their position in Divizia B, including an 8th-place finish in Series III in 1999–2000.

By the 2000–01 season, now widely known as the Zebras, UMT won Series II of Divizia B and achieved promotion to the Romanian top flight for the first time. Under Gheorghe Staicu, the Zebras ranked 16th in the 2001–02 season of Divizia A, relegating back to the second division. They were subsequently deducted seven points due to not achieving the 25-point limit last season and later excluded from the 2002–03 season due to financial problems, with all their results canceled. In 2003–04, the Zebras finished 9th in Series VII and 3rd in Series VI in 2004–05. The Zebras remained competitive in the following years, finishing as runners-up in Series VII in the 2005–06 season and 9th in Series IV in 2006–07. At the end of the 2007–08 season of Liga III, UMT ranked 16th in Series V and were relegated to the Timiș County League but did not start in this competition because they were dissolved.

== Honours ==
Liga II:

- Winners (1): 2000–01

Liga III:

- Winners (4): 1969–70, 1990–91, 1996–97, 1998–99
- Runners-up (3): 1972–73, 1983–84, 2005–06

Banat Regional Championship:

- Winners (1): 1966–67

== Former managers ==
- (Romania) Adalbert Androvits (1962–1969)
- (Romania) Costică Toma (1971–1972)
- (Romania) Iosif Lereter (1975–1977)
- (Romania) Cicerone Manolache (1977–1978)
- (Romania) Constantin Rădulescu (1979–1980)
- (Romania) Aurel Șunda (1991–1994)
- (Romania) Constantin Rădulescu (1998–1999)
- (Romania) Aurel Șunda (1999–2001)
- (Romania) Gheorghe Staicu (2001–2002)
- (Romania) Gheorghe Chimiuc
- (Romania) Cristian Contescu
- (Romania) Ciprian Aioanei
- (Romania) Orlando Trandu
- (Romania) Ion Dumitru
- (Romania) Remus Steop
