= Ion Ionescu (footballer, born 1936) =

Romanian footballer and coach (1936–2024)

Ion V. Ionescu
Personal information
- Date of birth: 2 May 1936
- Place of birth: Rudna, Romania
- Date of death: 30 June 2024 (aged 88)
- Place of death: Timișoara, Romania
- Height: 1.75 m (5 ft 9 in)
- Position: Attacking midfielder

Youth career
- 1945–1953: Politehnica Timișoara

Senior career*
Years	Team	Apps	(Gls)
1953–1954	Politehnica Timișoara	0	(0)
1955–1956	Progresul Sibiu		
1956–1959	Știința București		
1959–1960	Victoria București		

Managerial career
- 1960: Politehnica Timișoara (assistant)
- 1961–1964: Politehnica Timișoara (juniors)
- Variaș
- Gloria Timișoara
- 1964–1966: Politehnica Timișoara (assistant)
- 1966: Politehnica Timișoara
- 1966–1967: Politehnica Timișoara (assistant)
- 1967–1969: Progresul Timișoara (juniors)
- 1970–1971: CFR Timișoara (assistant)
- 1971–1972: UTA Arad (assistant)
- 1972–1975: Politehnica Timișoara
- 1975–1976: Jiul Petroșani
- 1976–1977: CFR Timișoara
- 1977–1979: UTA Arad
- 1979: CSM Reșița
- 1980–1981: Politehnica Timișoara
- 1982–1983: Politehnica Timișoara
- 1983–1984: Aurul Brad
- 1984–1986: Corvinul Hunedoara
- 1986–1988: Politehnica Timișoara
- 1988–1990: Sportul Studențesc București
- 1990–1991: Corvinul Hunedoara
- 1991–1992: Politehnica Timișoara
- 1993–1994: Progresul București
- 1996–1997: UTA Arad
- 2002: CSU Timișoara
- * Club domestic league appearances and goals

Ion V. "Jackie" Ionescu (2 May 1936 – 30 June 2024) was a Romanian football player and coach.

He was mostly known for his coaching spells at Politehnica Timișoara with whom he won a Cupa României and reached three other finals. He also eliminated Celtic in the 1980–81 European Cup Winners' Cup.

== Early life ==
Ionescu was born on 2 May 1936 in the Crai Nou village which is part of the Rudna commune in Romania. In 2016, during an interview with the Adevărul newspaper, he described his early life in Rudna:"I lived exclusively in Rudna, among Serbs. I was born in Crai Nou, but my father built a house in Rudna. It was nice. We had a neat house near the train station. We had fruit trees, a very rich vineyard, a small lake with fish, it was an idyllic country life before the Second World War, with Serbian friends, Hungarian friends, Romanian friends. We were all the same, there was no problem of misunderstandings.". In 1943 when he started school, his family moved to Timișoara, Ionescu saying about this period:"My father found a job at the town hall in Timișoara, and my mother - at General School no. 8. I was there too, but my mother was not my teacher. We moved to the Iosefin area, a central, highly developed area, another very multi-ethnic area. Fewer Serbs, many Hungarians, Germans, Jews. I was a neighbor, a few meters away, with Iolanda Balaș.". He explained that he got his nickname "Jackie": "During high school football, from the need for cosmopolitanism at that time, to have a cosmopolitan one in addition to the Romanian first name. Ion was not transformed into Jean, nor Ivan, but Jackie. At that time, this name was not only beautiful, but also dangerous. But I assumed it.".

== Playing career ==
Ionescu started playing football in 1945, aged 9 at Politehnica Timișoara's junior center. He stayed at Poli for a decade, going through all the stages of the youth center, playing right midfielder and even catching a match for the senior team in a friendly against Flamura Roșie Arad in 1954, where his direct opponent was József Pecsovszky. In 1955 he went to play for Progresul Sibiu, shortly afterwards moving to Știința București for three years. He retired in 1960 because of an injury, being aged 24 after spending one year at Victoria București, having spent all of his career playing in the Romanian lower leagues.

== Managerial career ==
"Jackie could never breathe away from Poli... He was like a fish, and Timișoara was his water."

— Journalist Ioan Chirilă talking about Ionescu

Ionescu started his coaching career shortly after he ended his playing career in 1960 at age 24, being Eugen Mladin's assistant at Politehnica Timișoara in Divizia A. In 1961 he worked at Politehnica's Center for Children and Juniors for about three years while also serving as head coach for the senior squads of Variaș and Gloria Timișoara in the lower leagues. In 1964 he started working once again as an assistant for The White-Purples. Ionescu became their head coach in 1966, having Nicolae Reuter as his assistant, but after 11 rounds he switched back to being an assistant, the team being relegated at the end of the season. After leaving Politehnica in 1967, he worked at two neighboring clubs, serving as a junior coach at Progresul before becoming an assistant for CFR's senior team. From 1971 until 1972 he was the assistant coach of Nicolae Dumitrescu at UTA Arad, the team reaching the quarter-finals in the 1971–72 UEFA Cup and finishing the championship in second place. In 1972 at age 36, Ionescu returned to Politehnica in Divizia B, helping the team finish in first place in his first season, earning promotion to the first league after an absence of five years. Then he reached the 1974 Cupa României final where they lost with 4–2 against Jiul Petroșani. He was the assistant coach of Constantin Cernăianu for Romania's students football team, winning the Universiade gold medal in the 1974 edition that was held in France.

In 1975 he went to coach Jiul after the 22nd round of the season, helping the team avoid relegation, managing to earn a 2–0 win over Dinamo București. In the following season the team finished in 12th place, avoiding relegation once again. Following a period spent at CFR Timișoara, Ionescu joined UTA Arad where he was dismissed by the end of his second season, leaving them in 12th place from 18 teams, and the club got relegated without him. After a short spell at CSM Reșița, he returned to Politehnica, managing to win the 1979–80 Cupa României, after a 2–1 win over Steaua București in the final. He participated with Poli in the 1980–81 European Cup Winners' Cup, eliminating Celtic in the first round, being eliminated in the following one by West Ham United. They also reached the 1981 Cupa României final, losing it with 6–0 to Universitatea Craiova. He left Politehnica shortly afterwards but returned in 1982 for only a short while, leaving before the end of the season at which the club was relegated. After one year spent at Aurul Brad, in 1984 Ionescu signed with Corvinul Hunedoara where in the 1985–86 season the team impressed by having an average of three goals per home game scored, including a 9–0 win over Rapid București. He returned to Politehnica, helping it get promoted from Divizia B back to the first league. There, after a 2–1 home win over Dinamo, he had a conflict with the opponent's coach, Mircea Lucescu, who threatened that Politehnica would be relegated by season's end, a fate which coincidentally or not, actually occurred. Shortly afterwards he signed with Sportul Studențesc București where he worked with Lucescu's son, Răzvan, who was a player, but with whom he had no problem. In 1990, Ionescu returned for a second spell at Corvinul but left after the club's officials allegedly asked him to throw a game with Universitatea Craiova. In 1991 he went for a final spell at Politehnica Timișoara where he finished the season in fifth place at equal points with the third place and also reached the Cupa României final which was lost at the penalty shoot-out to Steaua. He then participated with the club in the 1992–93 UEFA Cup edition where in the first round they faced Real Madrid, obtaining a 1–1 draw at Timișoara and losing with 4–0 at Santiago Bernabéu. After a spell at Progresul București from 1993 until 1994, Ionescu went back to UTA in 1996, this time in the second league. In 2002 he had his final coaching spell at third league side, CSU Timișoara.

Ionescu has a total of 496 matches as a manager in the Romanian top-division, Divizia A consisting of 194 victories, 89 draws and 213 losses.

== After retirement ==
After retiring as a coach, Ionescu held positions as a university professor, an advisor at Politehnica Timișoara (2005–2007), and a columnist for various local and national sports newspapers. He also gained recognition as a football analyst with numerous appearances on TV and the radio. He received the Honorary Citizen of Timișoara and Hunedoara titles.

In July 2009, after Politehnica Timișoara played the first leg against Mircea Lucescu's UEFA Cup holders, Shakhtar Donetsk in the third qualifying round of the 2009–10 Champions League, Ionescu said:"We have a 70–80% chance of qualifying (...) Shakhtar is a modest team. It won the UEFA Cup by chance and because it met very weak opponents. In Romania, Shakhtar would be a team in seventh place!". Eventually Politehnica eliminated Shakhtar.

== Writing ==
Ionescu wrote five books about football:

- Fotbal. Metode si mijloace de antrenament (Football. Training methods and means) - co-written with Angelo Niculescu (1972)
- Fotbal – Tactica astăzi (Football – The tactic of today) - co-written with Cornel Dinu (1977)
- Fotbal – Concepția de joc (Football – The concept of the game) - co-written with Cornel Dinu (1982)
- Fotbal – Tehnica și tactica jocului (Football – The technique and the tactic of the game)
- O minge în Babilon (A ball in Babylon)

== Death ==
Ionescu died on 30 June 2024 at age 88 in Timișoara.

== Honours ==
=== Player ===
Știința București

- Divizia C: 1958–59

=== Manager ===
Politehnica Timișoara

- Divizia B: 1972–73, 1986–87
- Cupa României: 1979–80, runner-up 1973–74, 1980–81, 1991–92
