= 1979–80 Cupa României =

Tournament details
- Country: Romania
- Teams: 30

Final positions
- Champions: Politehnica Timişoara
- Runners-up: Steaua București

Tournament statistics
- Matches played: 30

The 1979–80 Cupa României was the 42nd edition annual knockout tournament of Cupa României. The title was won by Politehnica Timişoara who defeated Steaua București by 2–1. 30 teams participated and 30 matches were played.

== Format ==
The competition is an annual knockout tournament.

First round proper matches are played on the ground of the lowest ranked team, then from the second round proper the matches are played on a neutral location.

In the first round proper, if a match is drawn after 90 minutes, the game goes in extra time, if the scored is still tight after 120 minutes, the team who played away will qualify, if the teams are from the same league, then the winner will be established at penalty kicks.

From the second round proper, if a match is drawn after 90 minutes, the game goes in extra time, if the scored is still tight after 120 minutes, then the winner will be established at penalty kicks.

From the first edition, the teams from Divizia A entered in competition in sixteen finals, rule which remained till today.

== First round proper ==
| Team 1 | Score | Team 2 |
|---|---|---|
9 December 1979
| Rulmentul Alexandria (Div. B) | 1–1 (a.e.t.) | (Div. A) FCM Galaţi |
| Gloria Bistrița (Div. B) | 2–0 | (Div. A) FC Baia Mare |
| Gloria Buzău (Div. A) | 0–1 | (Div. A) Steaua București |
| Metalul București (Div. B) | 5–1 | (Div. A) Olt Scornicești |
| Rapid București (Div. B) | 2-1 (a.e.t.) | (Div. A) Dinamo București |
| Victoria Călan (Div. C) | 2–2 (a.e.t.) | (Div. A) Politehnica Iași |
| Minerul Comăneşti (Div. C) | 2–5 | (Div. A) Universitatea Cluj |
| Unirea Dej (Div. C) | 1–4 | (Div. A) SC Bacău |
| Cristalul Dorohoi (Div. C) | 1–5 | (Div. A) Jiul Petroşani |
| Utilajul Făgăraş (Div. C) | 0–0 (a.e.t.) | (Div. A) Sportul Studenţesc București |
| Flacăra Horezu (Div. D) | 0–2 | (Div. A) CS Târgovişte |
| Cimentul Medgidia (Div. B) | 1–1 (a.e.t.) | (Div. A) ASA 1962 Târgu Mureș |
| Bihor Oradea (Div. B) | 0–2 | (Div. A) Chimia Râmnicu Vâlcea |
| Metalul Oţelu Roşu (Div. C) | 0–1 | (Div. A) Politehnica Timişoara |
| Petrolul Ploiești (Div. B) | 2–0 | (Div. A) Argeş Piteşti |
20 February 1980
| Universitatea Craiova (Div. A) | 1–0 (a.e.t.) | (Div. A) Olimpia Satu Mare |

== Second round proper ==
| Team 1 | Score | Team 2 |
|---|---|---|
24 February 1980
| Jiul Petroşani | 1–0 | Universitatea Cluj |
| Universitatea Craiova | 2–0 | SC Bacău |
| Sportul Studenţesc București | 2–2 (a.e.t.)(4–2 p) | Politehnica Iași |
| Rapid București | 3–2 (a.e.t.) | Metalul București |
| Politehnica Timişoara | 1–0 | ASA 1962 Târgu Mureș |
| Steaua București | 4–0 | CS Târgovişte |
| FCM Galaţi | 4–0 | Chimia Râmnicu Vâlcea |
| Gloria Bistrița | 1–0 | Petrolul Ploiești |

== Quarter-finals ==
| Team 1 | Score | Team 2 |
|---|---|---|
16 April 1980
| Rapid București | 0–0 (a.e.t.)(7-6 p) | Jiul Petroşani |
| Steaua București | 1–0 | FCM Galaţi |
| Universitatea Craiova | 1–0 | Sportul Studenţesc București |
| Politehnica Timişoara | 2-1 | Gloria Bistrița |

== Semi-finals ==
| Team 1 | Score | Team 2 |
|---|---|---|
28 May 1980
| Steaua București | 2-1 | Universitatea Craiova |
| Politehnica Timişoara | 1–1 (a.e.t.)(4-2 p) | Rapid București |

== Final ==
1 June 1980
16:30 EET

| Politehnica Timișoara | 2–1 (a.e.t.) | Steaua București |
|---|---|---|
| Vișan 43'; Păltinișanu 96' | Report | Stoica 76' |

23 August, Bucharest
Attendance: 50,000
Referee: Nicolae Rainea (Bârlad)

Cupa României 1979–80 winners

2nd title
