= 1982–83 Cupa României =

Tournament details
- Country: Romania

Final positions
- Champions: Universitatea Craiova
- Runners-up: Politehnica Timișoara

The 1982–83 Cupa României was the 45th edition of Romania's most prestigious football cup competition.

The title was won by Universitatea Craiova against Politehnica Timișoara. Craiova were unable to play in the 1983–84 European Cup Winners' Cup though, as the closing date for entries was a week before the final. As a result, both the President and Secretary of the Romanian FA – Andrei Rădulescu and Florin Dumitrescu were sacked.

== Format ==
The competition is an annual knockout tournament.

First round proper matches are played on the ground of the lowest ranked team, then from the second round proper the matches are played on a neutral location.

In the first round proper, if a match is drawn after 90 minutes, the game goes in extra time, if the scored is still tight after 120 minutes, the team who played away will qualify, if the teams are from the same league, then the winner will be established at penalty kicks.

From the second round proper, if a match is drawn after 90 minutes, the game goes in extra time, if the scored is still tight after 120 minutes, then the winner will be established at penalty kicks.

From the first edition, the teams from Divizia A entered in competition in sixteen finals, rule which remained till today.

== First round proper ==
Team 1	Score	Team 2
23 February 1983
Letea Bacău (Div. C)	1–3	(Div. A) FC Constanţa
Tractorul Brașov (Div. C)	2–1	(Div. A) CS Târgovişte
Dinamo București (Div. A)	3–1	(Div. A) Politehnica Iași
Progresul Vulcan București (Div. B)	1–0	(Div. A) Olt Scornicești
Sportul Muncitoresc Caracal (Div. C)	0–3	(Div. A) Petrolul Ploiești
Silvania Cehu Silvaniei (Div. C)	1–2	(Div. A) Bihor Oradea
Universitatea Cluj (Div. B)	0–3	(Div. A) Argeş Piteşti
Portul Constanța (Div. C)	0–3	(Div. A) Sportul Studenţesc București
Șoimii Lipova (Div. C)	0–2	(Div. A) FCM Brașov
Minerul Moldova Nouă (Div. C)	0–1	(Div. A) SC Bacău
Celuloza Piatra Neamţ (Div. C)	0–2	(Div. A) Chimia Râmnicu Vâlcea
Chimia Brazi (Div. C)	0–1	(Div. A) Corvinul Hunedoara
Metalul Rădăuţi (Div. C)	0–2 (a.e.t.)	(Div. A) Steaua București
Universitatea Craiova (Div. A)	3–2	(Div. A) ASA 1962 Târgu Mureș
Metalul Sighişoara (Div. C)	0–2	(Div. A) Politehnica Timişoara
Auto Timişoara (Div. D)	1–0	(Div. A) Jiul Petroşani

== Second round proper ==
Team 1	Score	Team 2
27 February 1983
Progresul Vulcan București	1–2 (a.e.t.)	Politehnica Timişoara
Corvinul Hunedoara	2–1 (a.e.t.)	Steaua București
Argeş Piteşti	2–1 (a.e.t.)	FC Constanţa
SC Bacău	0–3	Sportul Studenţesc București
Tractorul Brașov	0–1	Bihor Oradea
Auto Timişoara	1–3	Universitatea Craiova
FCM Brașov	1–2	Petrolul Ploiești
Chimia Râmnicu Vâlcea	0–1 (a.e.t.)	Dinamo București

== Quarter-finals ==
Team 1	Score	Team 2
22 June 1983
Corvinul Hunedoara	2–1	Bihor Oradea
Politehnica Timişoara	1–0	Petrolul Ploiești
Universitatea Craiova	2–0	Sportul Studenţesc București
Dinamo București	2–1	Argeş Piteşti

== Semi-finals ==
Team 1	Score	Team 2
29 June 1983
Corvinul Hunedoara	1–1 (a.e.t.)(8-9 p)	Politehnica Timişoara
Universitatea Craiova	1–1 (a.e.t.)(4-2 p)	Dinamo București

== Final ==
6 July 1983
17:00 EET

Universitatea Craiova	2–1	Politehnica Timişoara
Cămătaru 16', 67'	Report	Rotariu 87'

Stadionul 23 August, Bucharest
Attendance: 15,000
Referee: Dan Petrescu (Romania)

Cupa României 1982–83 winners

4th title
