= FC Politehnica Timișoara =

Politehnica Timișoara
- Full name: Fotbal Club Politehnica Timișoara
- Nicknames: Alb-violeții (The White-Purples); Băieții în Ghete (Boys in Boots); Timișorenii (The Timișoara People); Bănățenii (The Banat People); Echipa de pe Bega (The Bega River Team)
- Short name: Poli Timișoara
- Founded: 4 December 1921
- Dissolved: 2012
- Ground: Dan Păltinișanu
- Capacity: 32,972
Home colours	Away colours

Fotbal Club Politehnica Timișoara (Romanian pronunciation: [poliˈtehnika timiˈʃo̯ara]), commonly known as Politehnica Timișoara or simply Poli Timișoara, was a Romanian football club from Timișoara, Timiș County, established in 1921 and dissolved in 2012. During its existence, the team won two Cupa României trophies and was twice runner-up in the Liga I. It amassed 49 seasons in the latter competition.

Named after and initially run by the Polytechnic University of Timișoara, the club was founded in 1921 by mathematician Traian Lalescu. After two decades spent in the regional leagues, Politehnica promoted to the top flight in 1948. It claimed its first trophy in the 1957–58 season, when it defeated Progresul București in the national cup final. Internationally, "the White-Violets" made their European debut in the 1978–79 UEFA Cup, when they went past MTK Hungária in the first round.

Politehnica obtained its highest result in the national championship after finishing second in the 2008–09 Liga I. It repeated the performance in the 2010–11 season, but was relegated after not being able to obtain a new participation license due to unpaid debts, and was eventually dissolved in 2012.

Following Politehnica Timișoara's dissolution, two entities claimed to be its moral successors—ACS Poli Timișoara and SSU Politehnica Timișoara. The Polytechnic University, the owner of the brand and all of FC Politehnica records, ceded these for free use to ACS Poli between 2012 and 2021, but then moved them to SSU Politehnica starting from 2021. SSU also inherited the old club's fanbase since inception.

== History ==
=== Beginnings and lower leagues (1921–1945) ===
The club was founded in 1921 by the Polytechnic University of Timișoara under the name Societatea Sportivă Politehnica.

Its initial aim was to provide an opportunity for university students to work on their fitness within a competitive environment. The logistics of the sport proved problematic, as there were limited financial means available. Thanks to contributions gathered from university professors and employees, the club bought their first football kits, with white-black vertical stripes, and rented the "Patria" football stadium. It was not until 1928 that the club developed its own training grounds, "Politehnica", which were built by volunteers. Players for the team were chosen on merit from the pool of Timișoara students and high-schoolers, who trained after school hours during the week and played football on weekends. The football landscape in the city was already developed at that time, with CAT, RGMT and Chinezul Timișoara dominating locally.

After spending three years in the District Championships II, Politehnica won promotion to the first tier in 1924, by defeating Kadima Timișoara. In 1926, Austrian coach of Italian origin, Tony Cargnelli came to train CAT, but he also worked as a volunteer for Politehnica, thus becoming the first coach of the club. He managed both clubs including when they played against each other, after Politehnica's 3–0 win over CA from 1927 in the District Championships I, the Universul newspaper wrote: "The people of Timișoara had the opportunity to see a beautiful game between two teams that each in their own way showed what they owed to the joint coach Cargnelli". Cargnelli finished the 1926–27 District Championships I with CA on the fifth place and with Politehnica on the second with 23 points, just one below first place Chinezul Timișoara who qualified to the national championship. The club became established in the years to come, even finishing 2nd in the 1926–27 District Championships I, when Politehnica lost out to Chinezul by a single point, who were one of Romania's most famous football names at the time. However, the competitive level could not be easily sustained by a university club, as it was subject to the inflow and outflow of players conditioned by their student status. After a decline towards the end of the decade, the low-point came at the beginning of the 1930s, between 1931 and 1933, when due to insufficient material resources, Politehnica had to suspend its football activities. It reappeared in 1934 but remained a modest club, with mid-table classifications in the District Championships I, as well as the Divizia C and Divizia B, once they were founded. As war beckoned, the national championships were suspended and all football activities reduced to friendly matches and the "Cupa Eroilor" (1943–44).

Until the second World War, Politehnica was far from the number one Timișoara football club. Chinezul and then Ripensia won multiple Romanian championships, whereas the students' club failed to achieve similar results. It did, however, propel several players to the Romania national football team, with the likes of Sfera, Ignuţa, Deheleanu, Chiroiu, Pop, Protopopescu and Sepi all wearing the national jerseys.

=== Becoming one of the city's notable clubs (1945–1991) ===
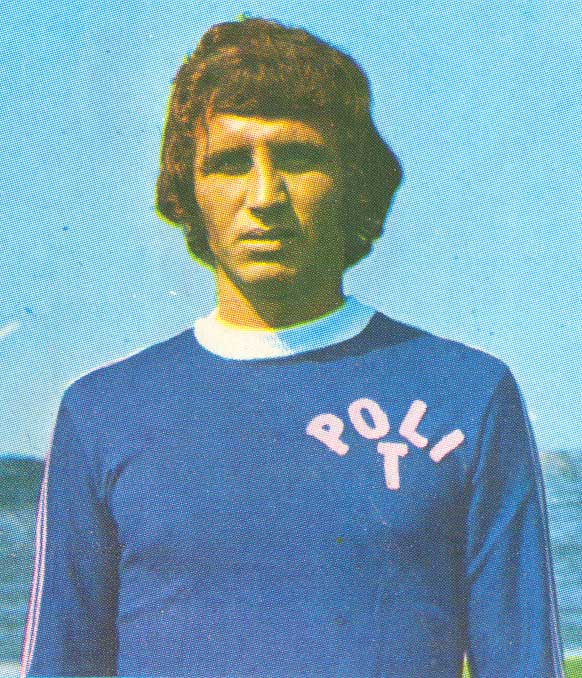
Dan Păltinișanu totalled 271 league matches for Politehnica Timișoara between 1973 and 1983. The largest stadium in the city is named after him.

With Romania under a communist regime, these decades were a challenge for Politehnica, as the club represented an educational institution of the highest tier. The numerous promotions and relegations between the first two national leagues were contrasted by the two Romanian cups won and the club's first forays into international football.

Politehnica was first promoted to Romanian top league, the Divizia A, in 1948, and played under the name CSU Timișoara in the first season. Shortly thereafter (from 1950), the club was renamed Știința Timișoara, in line with the desired nomenclature of the times. In spite of suffering its first relegation in 1951, the decade was an unusually consistent one, with the club returning swiftly to the top division and staying there until the season 1959. The high-point of the Ştiinţa years was winning the 1957–58 Romanian Cup, a 1–0 victory against Progresul București, with the club finishing joint first in the league in the same season, but losing out on goal difference.

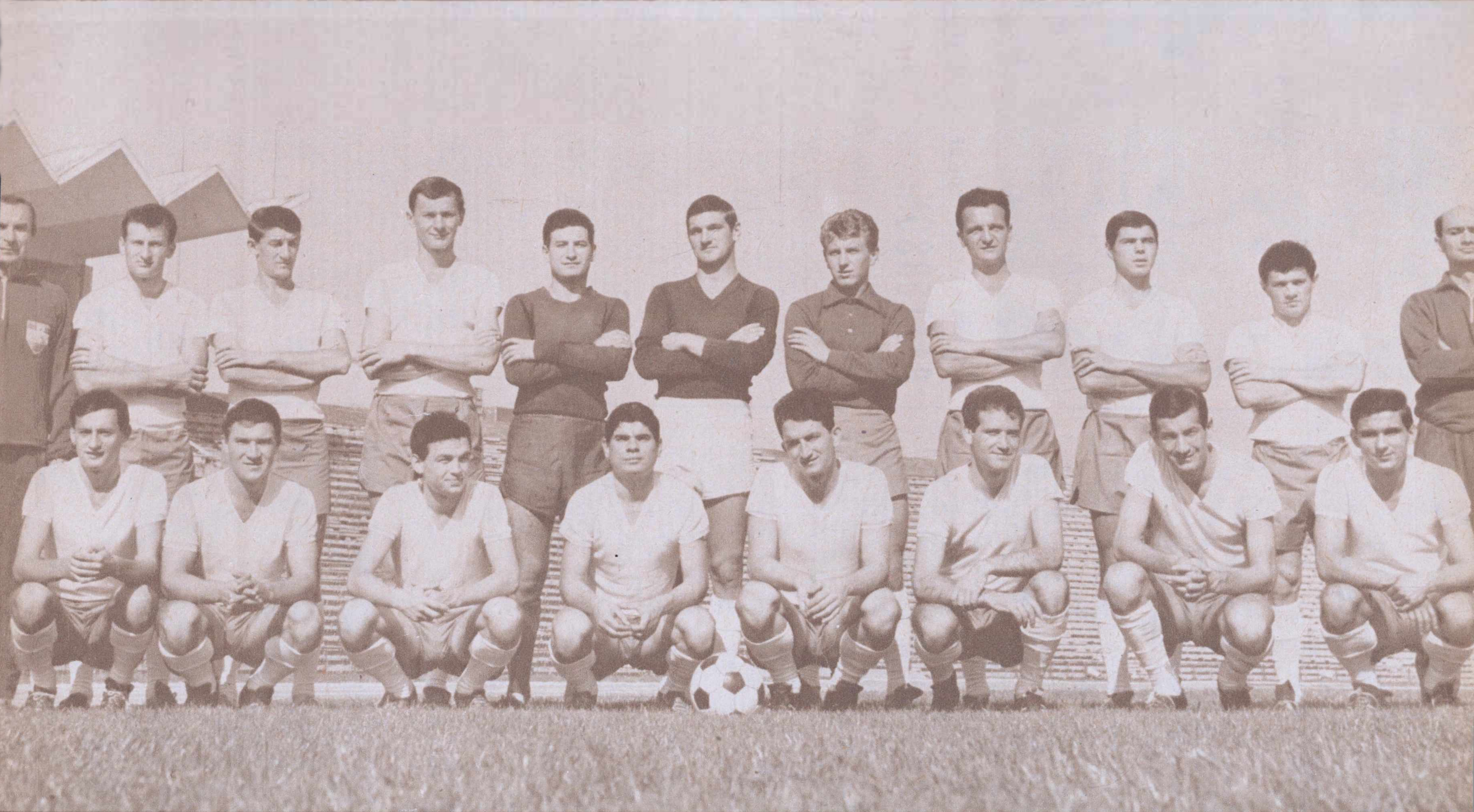
Știința Timișoara squad in 1965

The next decade saw the club struggle to remain in the first league, particularly towards the end of the 60s. However, it was then that the club's modern identity started taking shape. Firstly, in 1963, the largest stadium in Timişoara was completed. It was initially named "1 Mai", honoring the socialist workers' day, before being renamed several times in the 90s and finally settling on Stadionul Dan Păltinişanu. Secondly, the club reverted to its previous name of Politehnica Timișoara in 1966 and went to play during the next five decades on the then-erected stadium.

When Politehnica returned to the first league in 1973, after struggling to win promotion for several years, it went on to celebrate one of its best streaks in the top flight. With the likes of Emeric Dembrovschi and Dan Păltinişanu in the team, who both played for Romania and went on to become some of the most capped players in the club's history, and under the management of prof. Ion V. Ionescu, Politehnica lost that season's cup final. After managing a third place in the league with manager Angelo Niculescu in 1978, Politehnica took part in a continental competition for the first time. It was the 1978–79 UEFA Cup, where Poli defeated MTK Budapest (2–0 and 1–2), before going down to Honved Budapest (2–0 and 0–4) in the second round.

The club remained steady and managed to win its second cup trophy the following season, by beating Steaua București with 2–1, after extra time. Politehnica thereby qualified for the UEFA Cup Winners' Cup, where it managed to eliminate Celtic Glasgow (1–0 and 1–2), before being defeated by West Ham United (1–0 and 0–4) in second leg. In spite of losing another Romanian Cup final in 1981, the club qualified once more for the UEFA Cup Winners' Cup, where they lost to Leipzig 2–5 on aggregate.

After being relegated in 1983, Politehnica yo-yo-ed between Divizia A and the Divizia B, with promotions in 1984, 1987, 1989 and relegations in 1986 and 1988. Fans ironically called this period as the 'ABBA years'. As the Romanian Revolution, which started in Timișoara, signalled the end of an era, Politehnica managed to grab its most impressive result yet in European competitions, by eliminating Atlético Madrid (2–0 and 0–1) in the 1990–91 UEFA Cup.

=== After privatisation (1991–2001) ===
By state order, all public institutions were forced to relinquish and reorganize any owned sports clubs in 1991, to effectively privatize them. As a result, alongside the newly organized football club appeared a non-profit association, AFC Politehnica Timișoara. The latter, consisting of previous club players and staff, was mandated with owning and protecting the club records and intellectual property.

The club's swan song near the top of Romanian football for the next decade was to be the 1991–92 season. Poli finished 5th and also reached the Romanian Cup final, only to lose it on penalties against Steaua București. The consequent participation in the 1992–93 UEFA Cup, saw the club draw against Real Madrid (1–1 in Timișoara), before being defeated in the return leg (0–4). Politehnica lost several key players in the years after the forced privatization, which slowly lead to the team's downfall. In fewer than twenty four months from their draw against Real, the club was relegated to the Divizia B in 1994. Despite a fast return to the first league in 1995, Poli failed to consolidate their position and were soon relegated once more after the 1996–97 season.

An inability to rebound lead to mounting financial pressures. The club was temporarily owned by a Timișoara based businessman between 1998 and 2000, before the local authorities accepted the bid of an Italian investor, Claudio Zambon, to take over Politehnica. Despite an initial financial outlay, Poli finished 15th and was relegated to the third league, Divizia C, where it had last played in 1938. To avoid such an outcome, Zambon and the local authorities struck a deal with a league two club, Dacia Pitești, and purchased their license to participate in the Divizia B. After failing to earn promotion to top flight, the 2001–02 season posed an insurmountable challenge for Politehnica. Zambon's departure following disagreements with the local authorities meant the club found itself in dire financial straits. Forced to use mostly youth players, Politehnica finished the season dead last, with one win and four draws to its name, but negative eight points in the standings, due to unpaid debts. Once again the club was bound to be relegated to the third division.

=== Identity crisis, glory years and downfall (2002–2012) ===
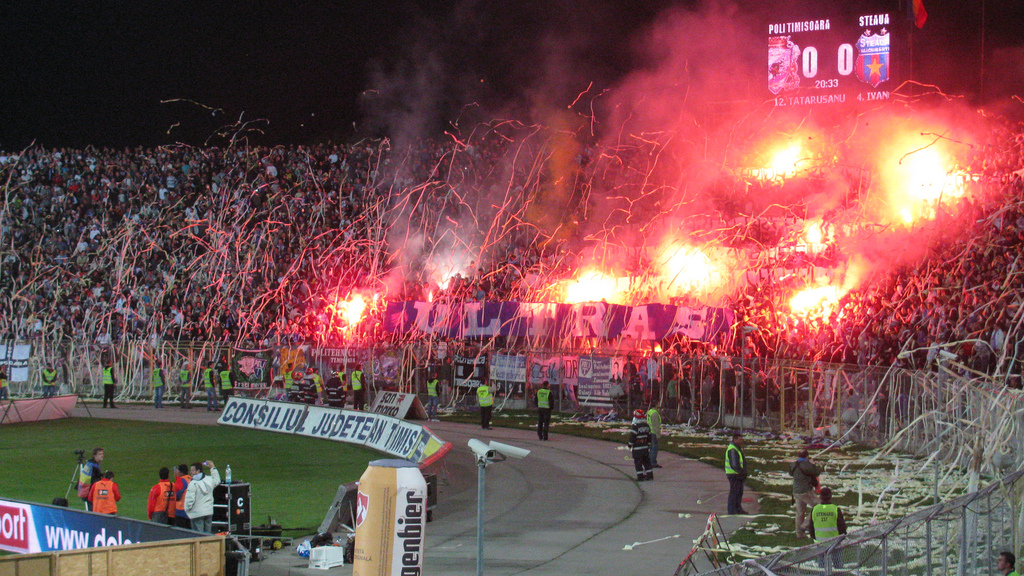
Poli Timișoara supporters during a first division game against FC Steaua București, April 2011.

In 2002, AEK Bucharest were promoted to Liga I, Romanian football's top division, for the first time, whereupon Anton Doboș, the club's owner, moved it to Timișoara. It was renamed Politehnica AEK Timișoara after merging with CSU Politehnica, a club owned and run by the Politehnica University, and received the full support of local authorities and white-purple fans. After a rocky first season, which required a spectacular relegation play-off against Gloria Buzău to avoid demotion, Poli AEK consolidated during the next season, finishing on a safe mid-table position. Moreover, starting with the 2004–05 season, the team changed its name to FCU Politehnica Timișoara, trying to reestablish its former identity.

Financially difficulties looming, Politehnica changed ownership once more. Former president Anton Doboș stayed on at the club for another year in a new position, while Balkan Petroleum Ltd., owned by Marian Iancu, took full charge. Significant investments in the transfer market transformed the club overnight, as it received the nickname "EuroPoli" for its newly found ambitions to reach the top of Romanian football.

During the takeover by Marian Iancu, a dispute regarding the proprietary rights for the club name, colors and records arose. After prolonged litigation, Politehnica was forced to change its name to FC Timișoara, following a decision by the Court of Arbitration for Sport. It was deemed that the colors and records dating before 2002 were lost in favor of former Politehnica Timișoara owner, Claudio Zambon. The Italian had struck a deal with AFC Politehnica, the non-profit association which owned said proprietary items, when he left Timișoara during the 2001–02 season.

Results on the pitch improved immediately after the takeover, but a leap to the Liga 1 podium proved elusive until 2008–09, when Politehnica finished runner-up, a feat repeated two seasons later. The club did, however, rejoin European football the season before that by qualifying for the UEFA Cup – sixteen years after its last appearance against Atletico Madrid. More European appearances followed, culminating with the qualification for the 3rd preliminary round of the 2009–10 UEFA Champions League. The team defeated the reigning UEFA Cup champions Shakhtar Donetsk, but were eliminated from the competition during the playoff round, which still meant the club would take part in the 2009–10 UEFA Europa League group stage.

In November 2010, the Romanian Court of Appeal returned Politehnica's name, colors and records to FC Timișoara.

Despite finishing second in the 2010–11 Liga I, the team was relegated to Liga II after the club failed to meet the requirements for obtaining the necessary licence to play in the first division. They played in the 2011–12 Liga II under the name of Politehnica Timișoara, and gained promotion back to the Liga I but were again denied the licence and were dissolved in September 2012. ACS Recaș was moved to Timișoara and was renamed ACS Poli Timișoara but the fans decided to support the amateur team ASU Politehnica Timișoara, considering ACS Poli Timișoara to be a fraud and a political maneuver.

The Romanian Football Federation announced before the start of the 2021–22 Liga II championship, that the Polytechnic University of Timișoara, the owner of the logo, history and all of Politehnica Timișoara's football records, approves the use of these by SSU Politehnica Timișoara. So from a legal point of view, from now on, this team will be considered as the official and legal successor of the old FC Politehnica Timișoara team.

== Support ==
Historically, Poli has been the most prominent football club in Timișoara after 1945, playing consistently in either the first or the second tier of Romanian football. Local rivalries with CFR Timișoara and UM Timișoara were relevant until the early 2000s. Afterwards, the former was relegated to a semi-professional status in the lower leagues and the latter was dissolved in 2008.

Nationally, Politehnica Timișoara's most important rivalries were the ones with Dinamo București and UTA Arad. The cities of Timișoara and Arad are located in proximity of each other in the western part of Romania; Both cities also claim to be the first place where football was played in the country. Poli fans, which now support ASU Politehnica Timișoara, had a friendly relationship with the supporters of Universitatea Craiova, Rapid București and Borussia Mönchengladbach.

== Honours ==
=== Domestic ===
- Liga I
  - Runners-up (2): 2008–09, 2010–11
- Liga II
  - Winners (10): 1947–48, 1952, 1959–60, 1964–65, 1972–73, 1983–84, 1986–87, 1988–89, 1994–95, 2011–12 (record)
  - Runners-up (1): 1970–71
- Cupa României
  - Winners (2): 1957–58, 1979–80
  - Runners-up (6): 1973–74, 1980–81, 1982–83, 1991–92, 2006–07, 2008–09
- Cupa Primăverii
  - Runners-up (1): 1957

== European record ==
Competition	S	P	W	D	L	GF	GA	GD
UEFA Champions League / European Cup	1	4	0	3	1	2	4	−2
UEFA Cup Winners' Cup / European Cup Winners' Cup	2	6	3	0	3	5	11	−6
UEFA Europa League / UEFA Cup	6	22	6	4	12	20	38	−18
Total	9	32	9	7	16	27	53	−26

=== Notable wins ===
Season	Match	Score
UEFA Cup / Europa League
1978–79	Poli Timișoara – (Hungary) MTK Budapest	2 – 0
1978–79	Poli Timișoara – (Hungary) Honvéd Budapest	2 – 0
1990–91	Poli Timișoara – (Spain) Atlético Madrid	2 – 0
1990–91	Poli Timișoara – (Portugal) Sporting Lisbon	2 – 0
2009–10	Poli Timișoara – (Croatia) Dinamo Zagreb	2 – 1
UEFA Cup Winners' Cup
1980–81	Poli Timișoara – (Scotland) Celtic Glasgow	1 – 0
1980–81	Poli Timișoara – (England) West Ham United	1 – 0

== Players ==
=== Most capped players ===
#	Name	Career	Matches	Goals
1	Sorin Vlaicu	1987–2001	288	29
2	Simion Surdan	1963–1975	282	58
3	Constantin Varga	1986–1999	274	71
4	Dan Păltinișanu	1970–1985	271	24
5	Stelian Anghel	1974–1984	262	72
6	Adrian Stoicov	1987–1998	246	3
7	Iosif Lereter	1957–1967	227	89
8	Gheorghe Șerbănoiu	1975–1984	222	13
9	Aurel Șunda	1979–1987	218	10
10	Emerich Dembrovschi	1966–1981	208	51

== Former managers ==
- (Austria) Tony Cargnelli (1926–1927)
- (Romania) Rudolf Bürger (1942–1946)
- (Romania) Ion Lăpușneanu (1948–1949)
- (Romania) Vasile Deheleanu (1950)
- (Romania) Rudolf Bürger (1950)
- (Romania) Eugen Mladin (1954)
- (Romania) Vasile Deheleanu (1955–1956)
- (Romania) Dincă Schileru (1958)
- (Romania) Vasile Deheleanu (1958–1959)
- (Romania) Nicolae Reuter (1961)
- (Romania) Vasile Gain (1961–1962)
- (Romania) Coloman Braun-Bogdan (1962–1963)
- (Romania) Nicolae Reuter (1963–1964)
- (Romania) Colea Vâlcov (1964)
- (Romania) Nicolae Godeanu (1967–1968)
- (Romania) Stere Zeană (1968)
- (Romania) Gheorghe Drăghiescu (1969)
- (Romania) Ion V. Ionescu (1972–1975)
- (Romania) Constantin Rădulescu (1975–1977)
- (Romania) Angelo Niculescu (1977–1979)
- (Romania) Constantin Rădulescu (1979)
- (Romania) Ion V. Ionescu (1980–1981)
- (Romania) Marcel Pigulea (1981–1982)
- (Romania) Cicerone Manolache (1982)
- (Romania) Emerich Dembrovschi (1983–1985)
- (Romania) Ion Dumitru (1985)
- (Romania) Robert Cosmoc (1985–1986)
- (Romania) Ion V. Ionescu (1986–1988)
- (Romania) Constantin Rădulescu (1988–1991)
- (Romania) Viorel Vișan (1991)
- (Romania) Ion V. Ionescu (1991–1992)
- (Romania) Constantin Rădulescu (1994–1996)
- (Romania) Emerich Dembrovschi (1996–1997)
- (Romania) Victor Roșca (1997)
- (Romania) Flavius Domide (1999)
- (Romania) Mihai Zamfir (2000)
- (Romania) George Ciorceri (2001)
- (Romania) Basarab Panduru (2002)
- (Romania) Gheorghe Mulțescu (2003)
- (Romania) Viorel Vișan (2003)
- (Romania) Basarab Panduru (2003–2004)
- (Romania) George Ciorceri (2004)
- (Romania) Gheorghe Mulțescu (2004)
- (Romania) Călin Zanc (2004) (caretaker)
- (Romania) Dumitru Dumitriu (2004)
- (Romania) Cosmin Olăroiu (2005)
- (Romania) Gheorghe Hagi (2005–2006)
- (Romania) Sorin Cârțu (2006)
- (Romania) Iosif Rotariu (2006) (caretaker)
- (Romania) Alin Artimon (2006–2007)
- (Romania) Iosif Rotariu (2007) (caretaker)
- (Romania) Valentin Velcea (2007) (caretaker)
- (Czech Republic) Dušan Uhrin Jr. (2007–2008)
- (Romania) Gabi Balint (2008–2009)
- (Romania) Valentin Velcea (2009) (caretaker)
- (Romania) Ioan Sabău (2009–2010)
- (Serbia) Vladimir Petrović (2010)
- (Romania) Cosmin Contra (2010)
- (Czech Republic) Dušan Uhrin Jr. (2010–2011)
- (Romania) Valentin Velcea (2011–2012)

== See also ==
- FC Politehnica II Timișoara
