= 1980–81 Cupa României =

Tournament details
- Country: Romania

Final positions
- Champions: Universitatea Craiova
- Runners-up: Politehnica Timişoara

The 1980–81 Cupa României was the 43rd edition of Romania's most prestigious football cup competition.

The title was won by Universitatea Craiova against Politehnica Timişoara.

== Format ==
The competition is an annual knockout tournament.

First round proper matches are played on the ground of the lowest ranked team, then from the second round proper the matches are played on a neutral location.

In the first round proper, if a match is drawn after 90 minutes, the game goes in extra time, if the score is still tight after 120 minutes, the team who played away will qualify, if the teams are from the same league, then the winner will be established at penalty kicks.

From the second round proper, if a match is drawn after 90 minutes, the game goes in extra time, if the scored is still tight after 120 minutes, then the winner will be established at penalty kicks.

From the first edition, the teams from Divizia A entered in competition in sixteen finals, rule which remained till today.

== First round proper ==
Team 1	Score	Team 2
26 November 1980
Gloria Bistrița (Div. B)	4–1	(Div. A) ASA 1962 Târgu Mureș
Automecanica București (Div. D)	1–2	(Div. A) Argeş Piteşti
Caraimanul Buşteni (Div. C)	0–1	(Div. A) Universitatea Craiova
FC Constanţa (Div. B)	1–0	(Div. A) Politehnica Iași
CFR Craiova (Div. C)	3–1	(Div. A) FCM Galaţi
Viitorul Gheorgheni (Div. B)	0–1	(Div. A) Sportul Studenţesc București
Laminorul Nădrag (Div. D)	2–9	(Div. A) Steaua București
Energia Oneşti (Div. C)	0–1 (a.e.t.)	(Div. A) Chimia Râmnicu Vâlcea
Unirea Oradea (Div. D)	4–2 (a.e.t.)	(Div. A) Progresul Vulcan București
Jiul Petroşani (Div. A)	0–1	(Div. A) Universitatea Cluj
Olimpia Râmnicu Sărat (Div. C)	1–2	(Div. A) Olt Scornicești
Laminorul Roman (Div. C)	1–3	(Div. A) Politehnica Timişoara
Dinamo București (Div. A)	0–1 (a.e.t.)	(Div. A) Corvinul Hunedoara
Energia Slatina (Div. C)	0–2	(Div. A) SC Bacău
Minerul Şuncuiuş (Div. D)	0–5	(Div. A) FCM Brașov
Sticla Arieșul Turda (Div. C)	2–1	(Div. A) FC Baia Mare

== Second round proper ==
Team 1	Score	Team 2
3 December 1980
FC Constanţa	3–2	Unirea Oradea
Steaua București	4–1 (a.e.t.)	Universitatea Cluj
Chimia Râmnicu Vâlcea	1–0	FCM Brașov
Politehnica Timişoara	2–1	Corvinul Hunedoara
SC Bacău	3–2	CFR Craiova
Argeş Piteşti	3–1	Olt Scornicești
Sticla Arieșul Turda	2–2 (a.e.t.)(4–1 p)	Sportul Studenţesc București
Universitatea Craiova	2–1	Gloria Bistrița

== Quarter-finals ==
Team 1	Score	Team 2
4 March 1981
Sticla Arieșul Turda	0–0 (a.e.t.)(6-5 p)	Steaua București
Politehnica Timişoara	3–2 (a.e.t.)	FC Constanţa
Universitatea Craiova	2–1 (a.e.t.)	Argeş Piteşti
SC Bacău	5–1 (a.e.t.)	Chimia Râmnicu Vâlcea

== Semi-finals ==
Team 1	Score	Team 2
20 May 1981
Universitatea Craiova	4–0	SC Bacău
Politehnica Timişoara	2–1 (a.e.t.)(4-2 p)	Sticla Arieșul Turda

== Final ==
24 June 1981
17:30 EET

Universitatea Craiova	6–0	Politehnica Timişoara
Balaci 20', 41'; Donose 55'; Crişan 72'; Cârţu 74'; Negrilă 82'	Report

Stadionul Republicii, Bucharest
Attendance: 25,000
Referee: Carol Jurja (Romania)

Cupa României 1980–81 winners

3rd title
