= Florin Oprea =

Romanian footballer (1948–2024)

Personal information
- Date of birth: 2 January 1948
- Place of birth: Măceșu de Sus, Romania
- Date of death: 23 April 2024 (aged 76)
- Height: 1.84 m (6 ft 0 in)
- Position: Goalkeeper

Senior career*
| Years | Team | Apps | (Gls) |
| 1967–1975 | Universitatea Craiova | 102 | (0) |
| 1975–1977 | Dinamo Slatina | | |
| Total | | 102 | (0) |

International career
| 1969–1970 | Romania U23 | 6 | (0) |
- * Club domestic league appearances and goals

Florin Oprea (2 January 1948 – 23 April 2024) was a Romanian footballer who played as a goalkeeper. He was part of "U" Craiova's team that won the 1973–74 Divizia A, which was the first trophy in the club's history.

== Club career ==
Oprea was born on 2 January 1948 in Măceșu de Sus, Romania. He began his senior career in 1967 at Universitatea Craiova, making his Divizia A debut on 17 December under coach Robert Cosmoc in a 4–2 home win over Rapid București. He was close to winning the title in the 1972–73 season, but "U" finished in second place on equal points with Dinamo București, losing controversially on the goal difference. This outcome led poet Adrian Păunescu to nickname Craiova as "Campioana unei mari iubiri" (The Champion of a great love). Eventually, Oprea helped the team win its first title in the following season, coach Constantin Cernăianu using him in 23 games. In the next season he made his debut in a European competition, playing in a 3–1 away loss to Åtvidaberg in the first round of the European Cup. The team also reached the 1975 Cupa României final, but he did not play in the 2–1 loss to Rapid. Oprea made his last Divizia A appearance on 8 December 1974, keeping a clean sheet for Universitatea in a 6–0 win over FC Galați, totaling 102 matches with 94 goals conceded in the competition. He played two more seasons for Dinamo Slatina in Divizia B, before retiring.

== International career ==
From 1969 until 1970, Oprea made six appearances for Romania's under-23 national team.

== Personal life ==
In 2023, Oprea was named Honorary Citizen of Craiova. In the same year he talked about his career in an interview, saying:"There were beautiful and interesting aspects, my greatest joy was when I arrived in the courtyard of Universitatea Craiova. It was a moment of joy when I was informed that I was staying in the group. I did my job, I had competition because in front of me were two experienced goalkeepers, Papuc and Vasilescu. They left, I came instead. The joys were enough, let's not forget that in almost 10 years, only three coaches have changed. Cosmoc took me, Coidum matured me and Cernăianu consecrated me. There have been good times since I made my debut, and it all culminated in winning the title in 1974".

Oprea died on 23 April 2024, at the age of 76.

== Honours ==
Universitatea Craiova

- Divizia A: 1973–74, runner-up 1972–73
- Cupa României runner-up: 1974–75
