= Nicolae Manea =

Romanian football player and manager

Personal information
- Date of birth: 11 March 1954
- Place of birth: Bucharest, Romania
- Date of death: 15 December 2014 (aged 60)
- Place of death: Bucharest, Romania
- Height: 1.79 m (5 ft 10 1/2 in)
- Position: Striker

Youth career
- 1967–1973: Rapid București

Senior career*
Years	Team	Apps	(Gls)
1973–1980	Rapid București (Note: The statistics for the 1977–78, 1978–79 and 1979–80 Divizia B seasons are unavailable.)	108	(32)
1980–1981	Steaua București	9	(1)
1981–1987	Rapid București (Note: The statistics for the 1980–81, 1981–82 and 1982–83 Divizia B seasons are unavailable.)	113	(17)
1987–1991	Gloria Bistrița (Note: The statistics for the 1989–90 Divizia B season are unavailable.)	70	(28)
Total		300	(78)

International career
1975–1976	Romania U23	11	(2)
1976	Romania	1	(0)

Managerial career
- 1989–1991: Gloria Bistrița (assistant)
- 1991–1992: Drobeta-Turnu Severin
- 1992–1996: Unirea Dej
- 1996–1997: Bihor Oradea
- 1997: Rapid București
- 1998: Ceahlăul Piatra Neamț
- 1998–2000: Rapid București (assistant)
- 1999: Rapid București
- 1999: Romania U21
- 2002: Romania U21
- 2003–2005: Romania U21
- 2005: FC Brașov
- 2009–2010: Rapid București
- 2010–2013: Gloria Bistrița
- 2013: Corona Brașov
- * Club domestic league appearances and goals

Nicolae Manea (11 March 1954 – 15 December 2014) was a Romanian football player and manager.

== Club career ==
Manea was born on 11 March 1954 in Bucharest, Romania. He began playing junior-level football at the age of 12 at Rapid București. He made his Divizia A debut on 16 March 1974 under coach Ion Urechiatu in Rapid's 1–1 draw against Steagul Roșu Brașov. The club suffered relegation at the end of that season, but Manea stayed with the team, helping it gain promotion back to the first league after one year by scoring 11 goals. They also reached the 1975 Cupa României final and Manea netted a brace under coach Ion Motroc in the 2–1 victory against Universitatea Craiova. Subsequently, he played in both legs of the 1975–76 European Cup Winners' Cup, where Rapid were eliminated in the first round with 2–1 on aggregate by Anderlecht, who eventually won the competition. He suffered another relegation with Rapid at the end of the 1976–77 season. In 1980, Manea joined Steaua București where he played nine league matches and scored a goal in a 2–2 draw against FCM Brașov during his half a year spell. Afterwards, he returned to Rapid, helping the team gain Divizia A promotion at the end of the 1982–83 season by scoring 15 goals. In 1987, he returned to Divizia B at Gloria Bistrița, netting 14 goals in the 1989–90 season to help them gain promotion to the first league. Subsequently, he scored the club's first Divizia A goal in a 2–1 loss to Inter Sibiu. Manea made his last Divizia A appearance on 21 April 1991 in Gloria's 1–0 away loss to Dacia Unirea Brăila, totaling 209 matches with 42 goals in the competition.

== International career ==
Manea played several matches for Romania's under-23 national team.

Manea made one appearance for Romania on 2 July 1976 under coach Ștefan Kovács in a 2–2 friendly draw against Iran, played at Aryamehr Stadium in Tehran.

== Managerial career ==
Manea had his first coaching experience while still an active player, being the assistant coach of Remus Vlad from 1989 to 1991. He began his career as head coach at Drobeta-Turnu Severin in 1991. From 1992 to 1996, he coached Unirea Dej. Subsequently, between 1996 and 1997, Manea led Bihor Oradea and shortly afterwards he had his first Divizia A experience at Rapid București. He continued to work in the first division, signing with Ceahlăul Piatra Neamț in 1998. During the 1998–99 season, he worked as an assistant coach at Rapid for Mircea Lucescu, Mircea Rednic and Dumitru Dumitriu, while also leading them as head coach for a few rounds, as the club won the title. Afterwards, Manea had three tenures with Romania's under-21 national team, the first of which took place in 1999. The second occurred in 2002 after Ion Moldovan left the team, though it lasted for only one match before Ilie Dumitrescu took charge of the squad. Finally, Manea returned to lead the team from 2003 to 2005. In 2005, he coached FC Brașov. Between 2007 and 2010, Manea worked for Rapid in different roles, including the positions of general secretary, managing director, deputy general manager, technical director and also head coach for a few matches in the 2009–10 season. In October 2010, Manea was appointed head coach at Gloria Bistrița. Although he successfully steered the team away from relegation on the pitch, the Romanian Football Federation subsequently relegated the club to the second division due to licensing irregularities. Manea stayed with the club, helping it gain promotion back to the first league at the end of the 2011–12 season. In October 2012, during a match against Pandurii Târgu Jiu, Manea reacted to a disputed goal by grabbing a stretcher and throwing it toward the referee in a fit of rage. He was unable to help the team avoid another relegation at the end of the season. However, he remained in the first league, coaching Corona Brașov for a few games at the start of the 2013–14 season. Afterwards, Manea worked as Corona's president, a position he also held at Rapid from January 2014 until October 2014. He has a total of 104 matches as a manager in the Romanian top-division, Liga I, consisting of 22 victories, 32 draws and 50 losses.

== Personal life and death ==
His son, Florin, was a footballer who briefly played in Divizia A for Gloria Bistrița and later became a sports agent.

Manea was diagnosed with liver cancer at the beginning of 2014 and died on 15 December 2014 in Bucharest.

== Honours ==
=== Player ===
Rapid București

- Divizia B: 1974–75, 1982–83
- Cupa României: 1974–75

Gloria Bistrița

- Divizia B: 1989–90

=== Manager ===
Rapid București

- Divizia A: 1998–99
