= 1975 Cupa României final =

- Event: 1974–75 Cupa României
Rapid București	Universitatea Craiova
2	1
- Date: 12 July 1975
- Venue: 23 August, Bucharest
- Referee: Nicolae Rainea (Bârlad)
- Attendance: 30,000

The 1975 Cupa României final was the 37th final of Romania's most prestigious football cup competition. It was disputed between Rapid București and Universitatea Craiova, and was won by Rapid București after a game with 3 goals, in extra time. It was the 9th cup for Rapid București.

Rapid București became the fourth club representing Divizia B which won the Romanian Cup final, after Metalul Reșița in 1954, Arieșul Turda in 1961 and Chimia Râmnicu Vâlcea in 1973.

== Match details ==
12 July 1975
20:00 EET

Rapid București	2–1 (a.e.t.)	Universitatea Craiova
Manea 70', 100'	Report	Oblemenco 54'

23 August, Bucharest
Attendance: 30,000
Referee: Nicolae Rainea (Bârlad)

GK	(Romania) Marian Ioniță
DF	(Romania) Ion Pop
DF	(Romania) Alexandru Grigoraş
DF	(Romania) Florin Marin
DF	(Romania) Octavian Niță
MF	(Romania) Iordan Angelescu (substituted off) 46'
MF	(Romania) Stelian Marin (substituted off) 58'
MF	(Romania) Gabriel Petcu
FW	(Romania) Gheorghe Iordan
FW	(Romania) Alexandru Neagu
FW	(Romania) Nicolae Manea
Substitutions:
MF	(Romania) Mircea Savu (substituted in) 46'
MF	(Romania) Marinel Râșniță (substituted in) 58'
Manager:
(Romania) Ion Motroc

GK	(Romania) Marius Purcaru
DF	(Romania) Victor Niculescu
DF	(Romania) Alexandru Boc
DF	(Romania) Petre Deselnicu
DF	(Romania) Cornel Berneanu
MF	(Romania) Costică Ștefănescu (substituted off) 92'
MF	(Romania) Grigore Ciupitu
MF	(Romania) Ilie Balaci (substituted off) 59'
FW	(Romania) Zoltan Crișan
FW	(Romania) Ion Oblemenco
FW	(Romania) Teodor Țarălungă (substituted off) 66'
Substitutions:
DF	(Romania) Nicolae Negrilă (substituted in) 66'
MF	(Romania) Lucian Strâmbeanu (substituted in) 92'
Manager:
(Romania) Constantin Cernăianu

== See also ==
- List of Cupa României finals
