= Lucian Strâmbeanu =

Romanian footballer

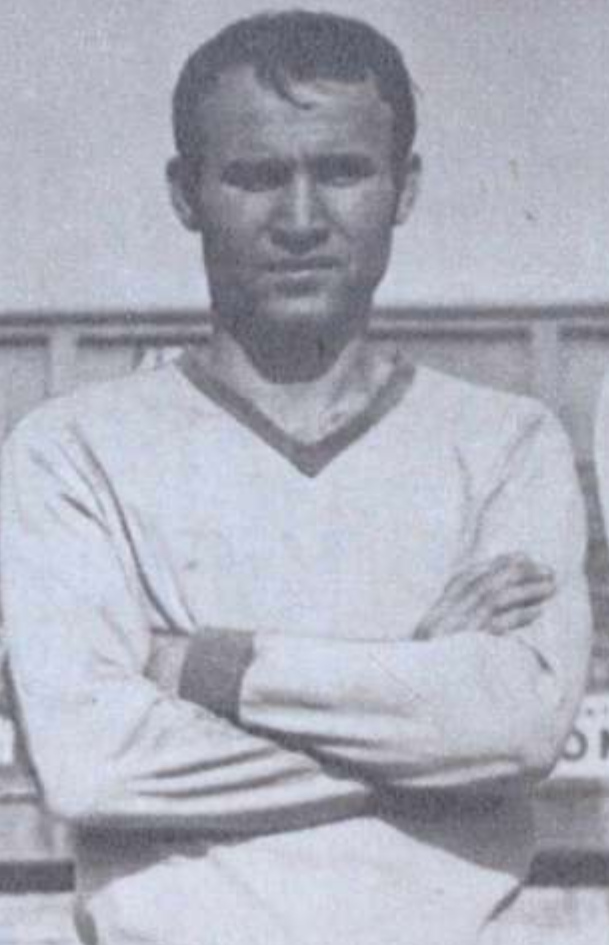

Personal information
- Date of birth: 4 February 1946
- Place of birth: Bucharest, Romania
- Date of death: 7 May 1988 (aged 42)
- Height: 1.73 m (5 ft 8 in)
- Position: Central midfielder

Youth career
- 1963–1964: Dinamo București

Senior career*
Years	Team	Apps	(Gls)
1965–1976	Universitatea Craiova	269	(5)
1976–1977	Electroputere Craiova		
Total		269	(5)

International career
1966–1969	Romania U23	6	(0)
- * Club domestic league appearances and goals

Lucian Strâmbeanu (4 February 1947 – 7 May 1988) was a Romanian footballer who played as a midfielder.

He was part of "U" Craiova's team that won the 1973–74 Divizia A title, which was the club's first trophy.

== Club career ==
Strâmbeanu was born on 4 February 1947 in Bucharest, Romania and began playing junior-level football in 1963 at local club Dinamo. One year later he moved to Universitatea Craiova, making his Divizia A debut on 26 September 1965 under coach Nicolae Oțeleanu in a 2–0 home win over UTA Arad. Subsequently, he played in both legs and scored once in the 4–2 aggregate loss to Pécsi Dózsa in the first round of the 1970–71 Inter-Cities Fairs Cup. "U" was close to winning the title in the 1972–73 season, but they finished in second place on equal points with Dinamo București, losing controversially on goal difference. This outcome led poet Adrian Păunescu to nickname Craiova as "Campioana unei mari iubiri" (The Champion of a great love). In the first round of the 1973–74 UEFA Cup season, "U" Craiova got past Fiorentina, being eliminated in the following one by Standard Liège, with Strâmbeanu playing all four games in the campaign. In the same season, he was part of Craiova's team that won the league title, which was the club's first trophy, being used by coach Constantin Cernăianu in 33 games. The team reached the 1975 Cupa României final where coach Cernăianu sent him in extra time to replace Costică Ștefănescu in the eventual 2–1 loss to Rapid București. Strâmbeanu made his last Divizia A appearance on 16 May 1976 in a 0–0 draw against CFR Cluj, totaling 269 matches with five goals in the competition and nine matches with one goal in European competitions (including two matches and one goal in the Inter-Cities Fairs Cup). He ended his career after playing during the 1976–77 Divizia B season for Electroputere Craiova.

== International career ==
From 1966 to 1969, Strâmbeanu played six matches for Romania's under-23 side.

== Death ==
Strâmbeanu died on 7 May 1988 at the age of 42. In 2003, he was named post-mortem Honorary Citizen of Craiova.

== Honours ==
Universitatea Craiova

- Divizia A: 1973–74
- Cupa României runner-up: 1974–75
