= Petre Deselnicu =

Romanian footballer

Personal information
- Date of birth: 23 September 1946
- Place of birth: Mofleni, Romania
- Date of death: 14 July 2003 (aged 56)
- Place of death: Bucharest, Romania
- Height: 1.83 m (6 ft 0 in)
- Position: Central defender

Senior career*
| Years | Team | Apps | (Gls) |
| 1963–1964 | Știința Craiova | 0 | (0) |
| 1964–1965 | Tractorul Brașov | 0 | (0) |
| 1965–1966 | Metrom Brașov | | |
| 1966–1975 | Universitatea Craiova | 241 | (12) |
| 1976 | Electroputere Craiova | 4 | (1) |
| 1976 | Universitatea Craiova | 5 | (0) |
| 1977 | Victoria Craiova | | |
| 1977–1978 | FCM Galați | 23 | (9) |
| Total | | 273 | (22) |

International career
| 1967–1969 | Romania U23 | 7 | (0) |
- * Club domestic league appearances and goals

Petre Deselnicu (23 September 1946 – 14 July 2003) was a Romanian footballer who played as a defender. He was part of "U" Craiova's team that won the 1973–74 Divizia A, which was the club's first trophy.

== Club career ==
Deselnicu was born on 23 September 1946 in Mofleni, Romania and began playing football in 1963 at Universitatea Craiova. In 1964 he joined Tractorul Brașov, moving one year later to neighboring club Metrom.

Subsequently, he returned to Universitatea, where he made his Divizia A debut on 21 August 1966 under coach Robert Cosmoc in a 4–1 away loss to Dinamo București. Deselnicu was close to winning the title in the 1972–73 season, but "U" finished in second place on equal points with Dinamo, losing controversially on the goal difference. This outcome led poet Adrian Păunescu to nickname Craiova as "Campioana unei mari iubiri" (The Champion of a great love). In the first round of the 1973–74 UEFA Cup season, "U" Craiova got past Fiorentina, being eliminated in the following one by Standard Liège, with Deselnicu playing all four games in the campaign. In the same season, he was part of Craiova's team that won the league title, which was the club's first trophy, being used by coach Constantin Cernăianu in 33 games in which he scored two goals. Then he played in both legs of the 4–3 aggregate loss to Åtvidaberg in the first round of the European Cup. The team reached the 1975 Cupa României final in which Cernăianu used him the entire match in the eventual 2–1 loss against Rapid București.

In 1976 he went to play for a short while at Electroputere Craiova in Divizia B. Deselnicu returned to Universitatea where on 11 September 1976, he made his last Divizia A appearance in a 1–1 draw against Sportul Studențesc București, totaling 246 matches with 12 goals in the competition and nine matches in European competitions (including two in the Inter-Cities Fairs Cup). Afterwards he joined Victoria Craiova for a while, before ending his career during the 1977–78 Divizia B season at FCM Galați.

== International career ==
Even though Deselnicu made several appearances between 1967 and 1969 for Romania's under-23 team, he never played for Romania's senior team. On 13 May 2020, Gazeta Sporturilor included him in a first XI of best Romanian players who never played for the senior national team.

== Later life and death ==
After ending his playing career, Deselnicu worked in leadership positions at Universitatea Craiova and Electroputere Craiova. While he was vice-president at "U" Craiova, the team won The Double in the 1990–91 season.

In 2003, Deselnicu received the Honorary Citizen of Craiova title.

He died on 14 July 2003 at age 56 during a surgery to repair a ruptured aorta in the Military Hospital in Bucharest.

== Honours ==
Universitatea Craiova

- Divizia A: 1973–74
- Cupa României runner-up: 1974–75
