= Constantin Oțet =

Romanian football coach (1940–1999)

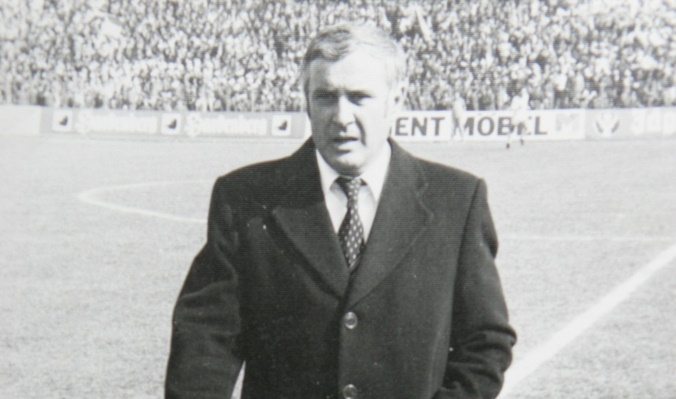
- Oțet in the 1980s

Personal information
- Date of birth: 24 December 1940
- Place of birth: Poroina, Kingdom of Romania
- Date of death: 19 February 1999 (aged 58)
- Place of death: Craiova, Romania

Senior career*
Years	Team	Apps	(Gls)
1959–1963	Metalul Turnu Severin		

Managerial career
- 1964–1968: Metalul Turnu Severin
- 1968–1977: Universitatea Craiova (assistant)
- 1977–1978: Pandurii Târgu Jiu
- 1978–1980: Argeș Pitești (assistant)
- 1980–1982: Universitatea Craiova (assistant)
- 1982–1984: Universitatea Craiova
- 1984–1985: Politehnica Iași
- 1985–1986: Olt Scornicești
- 1986: Minerul Motru
- 1986–1988: Universitatea Craiova
- 1988: Jiul Petroșani
- 1989–1990: Constructorul Craiova
- 1990: Dacia Unirea Brăila
- 1992: Universitatea Craiova
- 1993–1995: Ala'ab Damanhour
- 1996–1997: Al-Nassr (technical director)
- 1997: Universitatea Craiova
- 1998: Al-Jaish Damascus
- * Club domestic league appearances and goals

Constantin "Tică" Oțet (24 December 1940 – 19 February 1999) was a Romanian football coach.

== Playing career ==
Oțet was born in 1940 in Poroina, a village in the Șimian commune in Mehedinți County, Romania. In 1959, Oțet began playing football for Metalul Turnu Severin, but several injuries forced him to end his playing career early at the age of 23.

== Managerial career ==
Oțet began his coaching career at Divizia C club Metalul Turnu Severin, leading the team from 1964 to 1968. Subsequently, he worked for Universitatea Craiova between 1968 and 1977 as a junior coach and as an assistant coach for the main squads. His biggest achievements during this period were winning two national junior championships in the 1968–69 and 1975–76 seasons, as well as helping the senior team win the 1973–74 title, while serving as an assistant to Constantin Cernăianu.

For the 1977–78 season, Oțet was the head coach of second-tier club Pandurii Târgu Jiu, but could not avoid the team's relegation to Divizia C. Subsequently, he returned to work as an assistant under coach Florin Halagian at Argeș Pitești, helping the club win the 1978–79 championship. In 1980, he made a comeback to "U" Craiova and, alongside head coach Ion Oblemenco, led the club to win The Double in the 1980–81 season. Oțet became the team's head coach in 1982, guiding the "Craiova Maxima" generation to the 1982–83 UEFA Cup semi-finals by advancing past Fiorentina, Shamrock Rovers, Bordeaux and Kaiserslautern before being eliminated on the away goals rule after 1–1 on aggregate by Benfica. During the same season, he led "U" to win the Cupa României following a 2–1 victory against Politehnica Timișoara in the final, courtesy of a brace scored by Rodion Cămătaru. He was dismissed by Universitatea after a win over Sportul Studențesc București during the second half of the 1983–84 season.

From 1984 onwards, Oțet worked as head coach at first league sides Politehnica Iași and Olt Scornicești, as well as at lower-league side Minerul Motru. In 1986, he returned to "U" Craiova before moving in 1988 to Jiul Petroșani. Oțet went to coach Constructorul Craiova in 1989 and after one year he had a short tenure at Dacia Unirea Brăila. Afterwards, he had a three-year spell at Universitatea Craiova, working first as director of the youth center, then as technical director of the main team, followed by a brief stint as head coach.

In 1993, Oțet had his first coaching experience outside Romania at Egyptian club Ala'ab Damanhour. Between 1995 and 1996, he worked once again as a director for the youth center and then as a technical director for the main team of Universitatea Craiova. During the 1996–97 season, he assisted head coach Ilie Balaci as a technical director at Al-Nassr, together helping the team win the Gulf Club Champions Cup. Subsequently, in 1997 Oțet worked at Universitatea Craiova's youth center and also had a short tenure as head coach of the main squad. From February 1998 to August 1998, he coached Al-Jaish Damascus, helping the club win the Syrian League and the Syrian Cup following a 5–2 victory against Al-Karamah. He also led the team to the Arab Cup Winners' Cup final, where they were defeated 2–1 by MC Oran.

== Death ==
Oțet died on 19 February 1999 at age 58 in Craiova, Romania. He was posthumously named Honorary Citizen of Craiova on 12 April 1999.

A book about him was written by Ion Jianu, titled Constantin Oțet, antrenorul unei echipe de legendă, Craiova Maxima (Constantin Oțet, the coach of a legendary team, Craiova Maxima.), which was released in 2006.

== Honours ==
=== Manager ===
Universitatea Craiova

- Cupa României: 1982–83

Al-Jaish Damascus

- Syrian League: 1997–98
- Syrian Cup: 1997–98
- Arab Cup Winners' Cup runner-up: 1998

=== Assistant manager ===
Universitatea Craiova

- Divizia A: 1973–74, 1980–81
- Cupa României: 1980–81

Argeș Pitești

- Divizia A: 1978–79
