= Petre Purima =

Romanian footballer

Personal information
- Date of birth: 21 January 1951 (age 75)
- Place of birth: Mediaș, Romania
- Position: Left back

Senior career*
Years	Team	Apps	(Gls)
1970–1972	Gaz Metan Mediaș	22	(0)
1972–1975	UTA Arad	57	(0)
1975–1982	Universitatea Craiova	160	(3)
1982–1987	Carpați Mârșa	134	(6)
Total		373	(9)

International career
1972	Romania U18	1	(0)
1973–1974	Romania U21	4	(0)
1973–1976	Romania U23	11	(0)
1978–1979	Romania Olympic	2	(0)
1978	Romania B	1	(0)
- * Club domestic league appearances and goals

Petre Purima (born 21 January 1951) is a Romanian former footballer who played as a left defender.

== Club career ==
Purima was born on 21 January 1951 in Mediaș, Romania. He began playing football during the 1970–71 Divizia B season at local club Gaz Metan. The club was relegated to Divizia C at the end of the 1971–72 season. Subsequently, he joined UTA Arad where he made his Divizia A debut on 26 November 1972 under coach Nicolae Dumitrescu in a 0–0 draw against Steaua București. In 1975, Purima went to play for Universitatea Craiova where he played over the years as a left and right defender, having to compete with Nicolae Negrilă and Nicolae Ungureanu. He helped the club win two consecutive league titles in 1980 and 1981. At the first one he contributed with one goal scored in the 17 appearances given to him by coach Valentin Stănescu and in the second he played 15 matches under coach Ion Oblemenco. He also won the Cupa României three times, but played in only two finals. Purima played 10 games for "U" Craiova in European competitions. Notably, in the second round of the 1979–80 UEFA Cup, he played in one leg of the 4–0 aggregate win over Leeds United, as Universitatea became the first Romanian club that eliminated a team from England in European competitions. He made his last Divizia A appearance on 12 June 1982 in Universitatea's 4–0 home win over Progresul București, totaling 217 matches with three goals in the competition. Afterwards, Purima went to play for Carpați Mârșa in Divizia B where he retired in 1987.

== International career ==
From 1972 to 1978, Purima consistently featured for Romania's under-18, under-21, under-23, Olympic and B teams.

== Personal life ==
In 2003, Purima received the Honorary Citizen of Craiova title.

== Honours ==
Universitatea Craiova

- Divizia A: 1979–80, 1980–81
- Cupa României: 1976–77, 1977–78, 1980–81
