= Nicolae Ivan (footballer) =

Romanian footballer

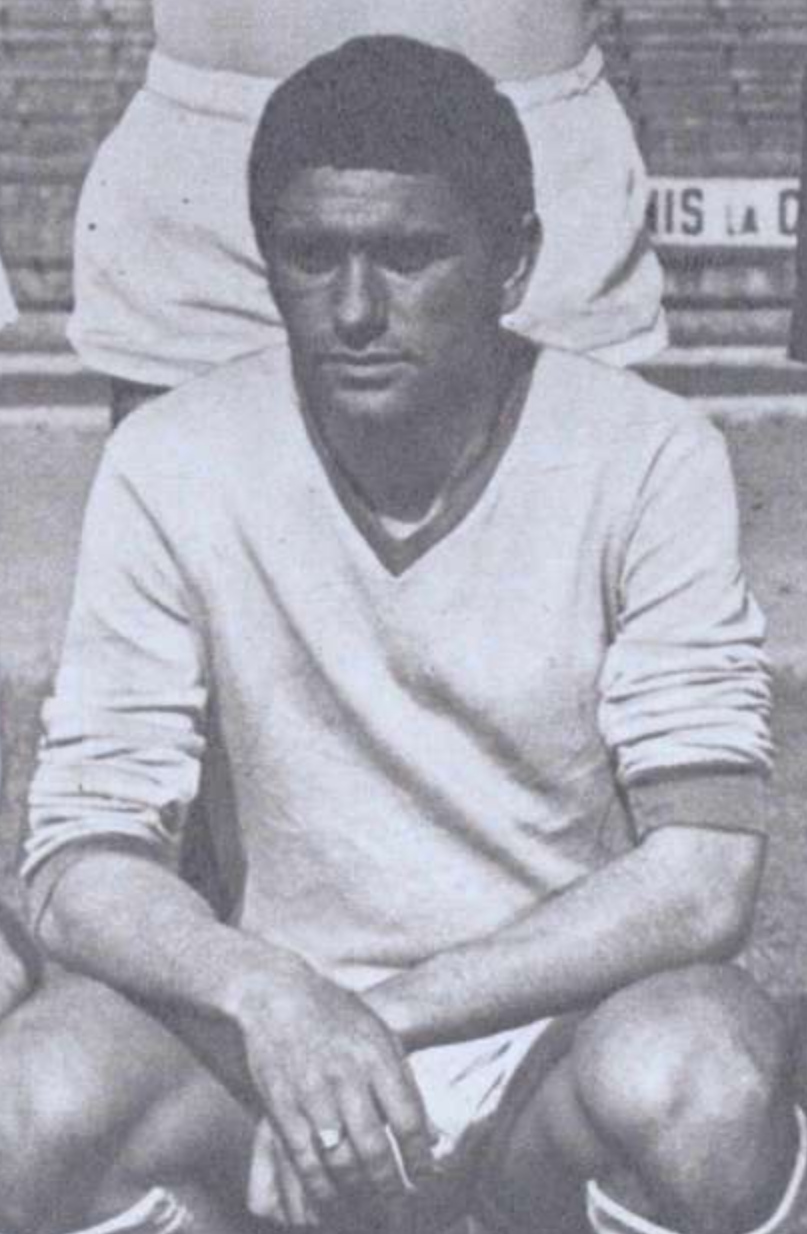

Personal information
- Full name: Nicolae Valeriu Ivan
- Date of birth: 28 August 1941
- Place of birth: Bucharest, Romania
- Date of death: 7 August 2018 (aged 76)
- Height: 1.75 m (5 ft 9 in)
- Position: Left back

Youth career
- 1955–1961: Constructorul București

Senior career*
Years	Team	Apps	(Gls)
1961–1962	Flacăra Moreni		
1962–1965	Petrolul Ploiești	48	(0)
1965–1974	Universitatea Craiova	192	(14)
1974–1975	Dinamo Slatina		
1975–1980	Energia Slatina		
Total		240	(14)

Managerial career
- 1980–1981: Energia Slatina
- 1981–1982: TM București
- 1982–1984: Universitatea Craiova (assistant)
- 1984–1985: TM București
- 1985–1987: Olt Scornicești (assistant)
- 1987–1994: TM București
- * Club domestic league appearances and goals

Nicolae Valeriu Ivan (28 August 1941 – 7 August 2018) was a Romanian football defender and manager.

== Playing career ==
Ivan was born on 28 August 1941 in Bucharest, Romania and began playing junior-level football in 1955 at Constructorul. In 1961, he started his career in Divizia B at Flacăra Moreni. Subsequently, he joined Petrolul Ploiești, making his Divizia A debut under coach Ilie Oană on 19 August 1962 in a 0–0 draw against Progresul București. Ivan played six matches as the club reached the 1962–63 Inter-Cities Fairs Cup quarter-finals where he scored his side's goal in the 2–1 aggregate loss to Ferencváros. Afterwards, he played the entire match under coach Oană in the 6–1 victory against Siderurgistul Galați in the 1963 Cupa României final.

In 1965, Ivan went to play for Universitatea Craiova. "U" was close to winning the title in the 1972–73 season, but they finished in second place on equal points with Dinamo București, losing controversially on goal difference. This outcome led poet Adrian Păunescu to nickname Craiova as "Campioana unei mari iubiri" (The Champion of a great love). In the following season, Ivan was part of Craiova's team that won the league title, which was the club's first trophy, being used by coach Constantin Cernăianu in nine matches in which he scored two goals. He made his last Divizia A appearance in the last round of that season in the 0–0 draw against Petrolul, as the team earned the point that mathematically secured the championship. Ivan has a total of 240 matches with 14 goals in the Romanian top-league and 12 matches with one goal in European competitions (including 11 matches and one goal in the Inter-Cities Fairs Cup).

In 1974, he went to play for Dinamo Slatina in Divizia B. One year later, Ivan joined neighboring club Energia until 1980 when he retired.

== Managerial career ==
After he ended his playing career, Ivan worked as a manager, becoming head coach at Energia Slatina in 1980. Subsequently, he worked for TM București from 1981 to 1982. In 1982, Ivan became Constantin Oțet's assistant at "U" Craiova until 1984, a period in which the club won the 1982–83 Cupa României and reached the semi-finals of the 1982–83 UEFA Cup. In 1984, he returned as head coach to TM București, but in 1985 he went to work as an assistant for two years at Olt Scornicești. From 1987 to 1994, Ivan had a third spell as head coach at TM București. Between 1994 and 1997, he was "U" Craiova's vice-president.

== Personal life and death ==
In 2003, Ivan received the Honorary Citizen of Craiova title.

Ivan died on 7 August 2018 at the age of 76.

== Honours ==
Petrolul Ploiești

- Cupa României: 1962–63

Universitatea Craiova

- Divizia A: 1973–74
