= Nicolae Ivan =

Nicolae Ivan may refer to:

- Nicolae Ivan (bishop) (1855–1936), Romanian cleric
- Nicolae Ivan (footballer) (1941–2018), Romanian football defender and manager
- Nicolae Ivan (swimmer) (born 1975), Romanian freestyle swimmer
