= Ion Velea =

Romanian footballer

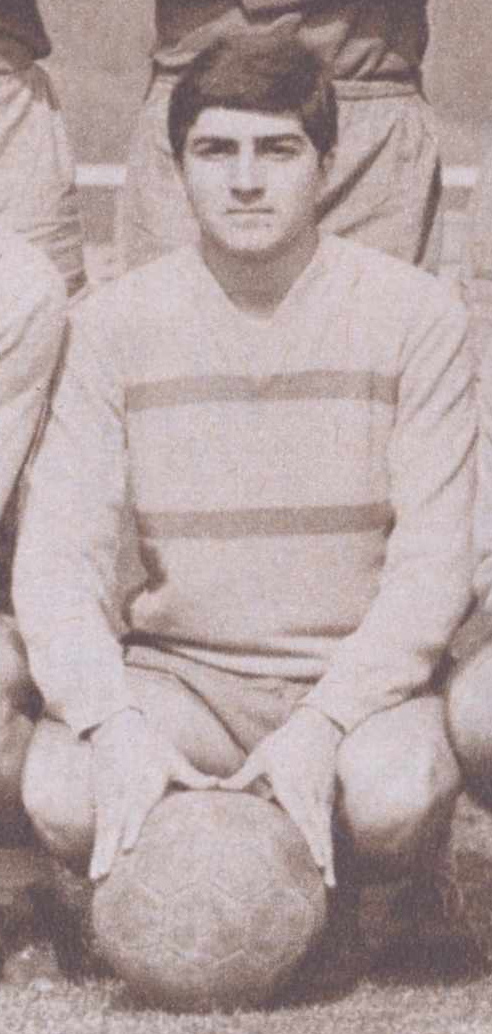

Personal information
- Date of birth: 14 September 1947 (age 79)
- Place of birth: Bucharest, Romania
- Position: Left back

Youth career
- 1961–1962: Metalul București
- 1962–1964: Viitorul București
- 1964–1965: Dinamo București

Senior career*
Years	Team	Apps	(Gls)
1965–1967	Siderurgistul Galați (Note: The statistics for the 1966–67 Divizia B season are unavailable.)	9	(0)
1967–1968	Politehnica Galați	24	(1)
1968–1974	Universitatea Craiova	125	(4)
1975	FC Constanța	2	(0)
1977–1978	Pandurii Târgu Jiu		
Total		160	(5)

International career
1966–1968	Romania U23	17	(1)
1966	Romania B	1	(1)

Managerial career
- 1994: Extensiv Craiova
- * Club domestic league appearances and goals

Ion Velea (born 14 September 1947) is a Romanian former footballer and referee.

He was part of "U" Craiova's team that won the 1973–74 Divizia A, which was the club's first trophy.

== Club career ==
Velea, nicknamed "Pelicanul" (The Pelican), was born on 14 September 1947 in Bucharest, Romania. At the age of 12, he became Bucharest champion at tennis in his age category. Eventually, he gave up tennis and went to play junior-level football at Metalul București. Subsequently, he joined Viitorul București and in 1964 he arrived at Dinamo București. One year later, Velea went to play for Siderurgistul Galați where he made his Divizia A debut under coach Ion Zaharia on 26 September 1965 in a 5–1 away loss to Steaua București. However, the team was relegated at the end of the season, but he stayed with them for one more year. Afterwards, he joined neighboring club Politehnica, also in Divizia B.

In 1968, Velea went back to first-league football at Universitatea Craiova. There, he made his debut in European competitions, playing in a 2–1 win over Pécsi Dózsa in the first round of the 1970–71 Inter-Cities Fairs Cup. However, the team did not qualify further, as they lost the second leg 3–0 without Velea playing. "U" was close to winning the title in the 1972–73 season, but they finished in second place on equal points with Dinamo București, losing controversially on goal difference. This outcome led poet Adrian Păunescu to nickname Craiova as "Campioana unei mari iubiri" (The Champion of a great love). In the first round of the 1973–74 UEFA Cup season, "U" Craiova got past Fiorentina, being eliminated in the following one by Standard Liège, with Velea playing two games in the campaign. In the same season, Velea was part of Craiova's team that won the league title, which was the club's first trophy, being used by coach Constantin Cernăianu in 14 matches in which he scored once.

In the middle of the 1974–75 season, Velea joined FC Constanța. There, he made his last Divizia A appearance on 29 June 1975 in a 2–0 home victory against CFR Cluj, totaling 136 matches with four goals in the competition. Velea ended his career after playing for Pandurii Târgu Jiu during the 1977–78 Divizia B season.

== International career ==
From 1966 to 1968, Velea was consistently featured for Romania's under-23 and B sides.

== After retirement ==
After he ended his playing career, Velea became a referee who officiated 123 Divizia A matches over the course of 12 years. As a linesman, he officiated another 100 games in the Romanian top-league. He also served as a linesman to Ioan Igna in three semi-finals of European competitions: Porto 1–0 Aberdeen (1983–84 European Cup Winners' Cup), Željezničar 2–1 Videoton (1984–85 UEFA Cup) and Dukla Prague 1–1 Dynamo Kyiv (1985–86 European Cup Winners' Cup).

In 1994, Velea led Extensiv Craiova as coach in a 0–0 draw against Gloria Bistrița in Divizia A.

== Personal life ==
In 2023, Velea received the Honorary Citizen of Craiova title.

== Honours ==
Universitatea Craiova

- Divizia A: 1973–74
