= Ion Motroc =

Romanian footballer

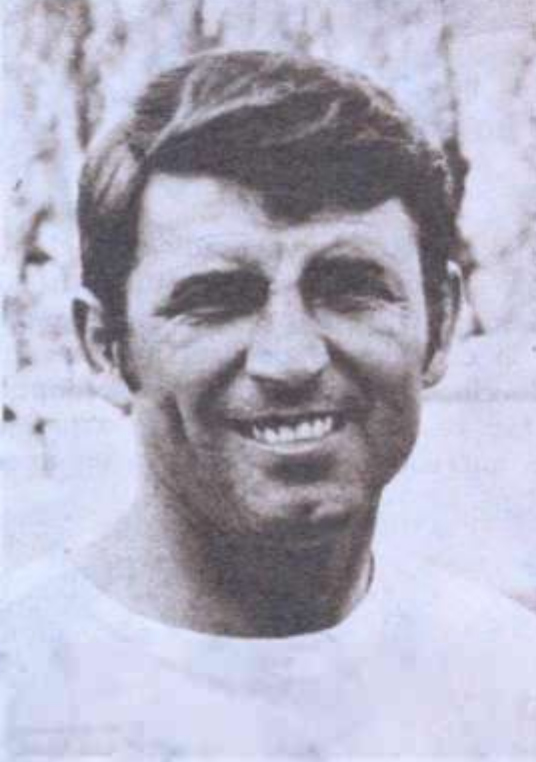
- Motroc in 1972

Personal information
- Date of birth: 14 February 1937 (age 89)
- Place of birth: Bucharest, Romania
- Height: 1.76 m (5 ft 9 in)
- Position: Defender

Youth career
- 1950–1953: Locomotiva București

Senior career*
Years	Team	Apps	(Gls)
1953–1955	Locomotiva București	1	(0)
1956	Progresul CPCS București		
1957–1960	Dinamo București	38	(0)
1960–1969	Rapid București	226	(1)
1969–1970	Altay Izmir	8	(0)
1970	Sportul Studențesc București	2	(0)
Total		275	(1)

International career
1961–1965	Romania	2	(0)

Managerial career
- 1970–1972: Sportul Studențesc București
- 1973: Mersin İdmanyurdu
- 1974–1977: Rapid București
- 1977–1978: FCM Reșița
- 1981: Rapid București
- 1982–1983: Politehnica Iași
- 1983: MC Oujda
- 1983–1986: Raja Casablanca
- 1988: Rapid București (assistant)
- 1988–1989: Rapid București
- 1997: Chindia Târgoviște
- 1997–1998: Al-Merrikh
- * Club domestic league appearances and goals

Ion Motroc (born 14 February 1937) is a Romanian former professional football defender and manager. He spent the majority of his playing career with Rapid București, and was part of the squad that won the Divizia A title in 1967.

== Club career ==
Motroc was born on 14 February 1937 in Bucharest, Romania, growing up in the Giulești neighborhood, and began playing junior-level football in 1950 at local club Locomotiva București. He made his Divizia A debut at age 16 under coach Iosif Lengheriu on 17 May 1953 in Locomotiva's 0–0 draw against Știința Cluj. Motroc then played for one season at Progresul CPCS București in Divizia B before joining Dinamo București, where he won the 1958–59 Cupa României over the course of three seasons. He returned to Rapid, the club from his Giulești neighborhood, accepting a lower salary because he wanted to come back to the place he grew up.

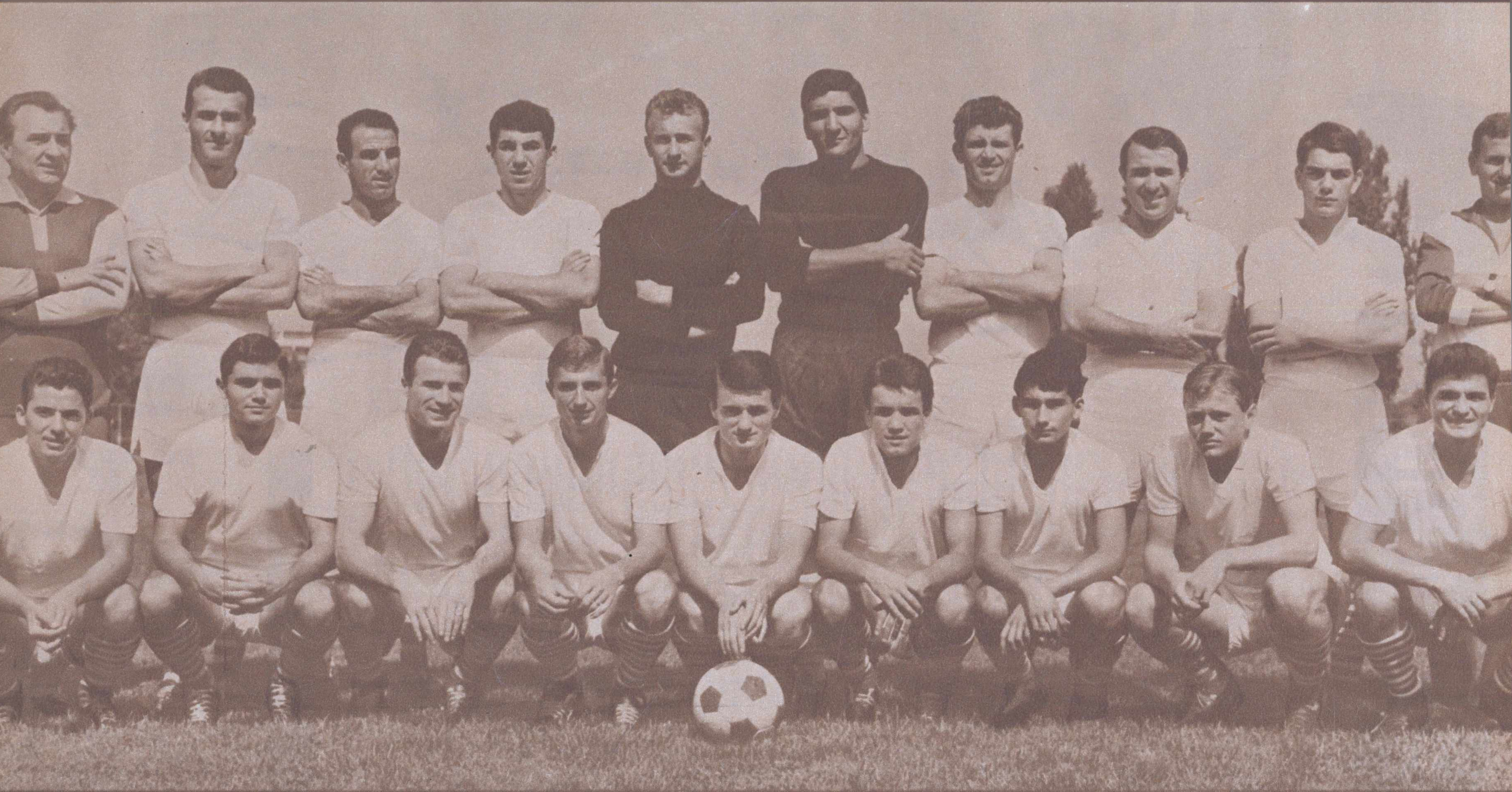
Rapid București in the 1965–66 season. Motroc is back row, fourth from right.

Motroc spent nine seasons with The Railwaymen. In April 1961, he scored a goal with a scissors kick in a 2–1 win over Dinamo București. He helped the club win the 1966–67 Divizia A, their first title, playing in 25 matches under coach Valentin Stănescu and serving as team captain. He also won two Balkans Cups in 1964 and 1966. Motroc reached three Cupa României finals, playing in all. The first two in 1961 and 1962 under the guidance of coach Ion Mihăilescu were lost to Arieșul Turda and Steaua București respectively. During the 1968 final he was coached by Stănescu in the loss against Dinamo București. Motroc played five games in European competitions (including one appearance in the Inter-cities Fairs Cup), taking part in the 1967–68 European Cup campaign in which Rapid got past Trakia Plovdiv, being eliminated by Juventus in the following round. He made his last Divizia A appearance on 15 June 1969 in a 3–0 victory against Jiul Petroșani, totaling 265 matches in the competition with one goal scored and 34 appearances with one goal in the Cupa României.

In 1969, alongside his former Rapid teammate Viorel Kraus, Motroc went to play in Turkey for Altay Izmir under coach Ted Dumitru. His Turkish league debut took place on 18 October in a 1–1 away draw against PTT. The club finished in third place in the league during the 1969–70 season, with Motroc appearing in eight league matches. He returned to Romania, where he ended his career by playing two matches in Divizia B for Sportul Studențesc București.

== International career ==
Motroc made two appearances for Romania, making his debut on 14 May 1961 under coach Gheorghe Popescu in a friendly which ended with a 1–0 away victory against Turkey. His second game was also an away match against Turkey, this time the result being a 2–1 loss in the 1966 World Cup qualifiers.

== Managerial career ==
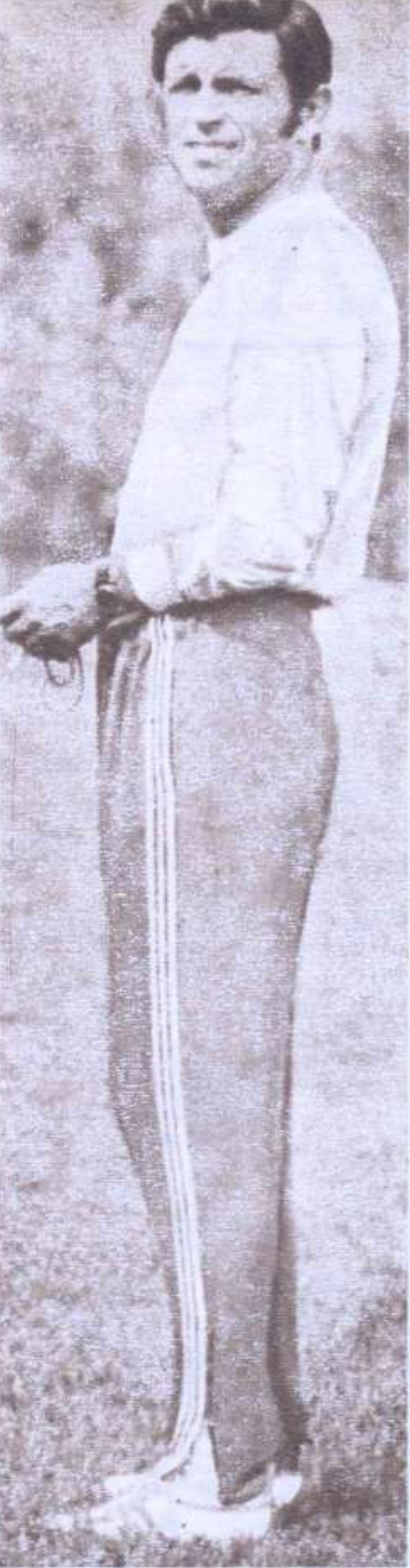
Motroc coaching Sportul in 1972

Motroc started his managerial career in 1970 at Sportul Studențesc București, a team he helped get promoted to Divizia A, after which he coached Turkish club Mersin İdmanyurdu.

In 1974, he coached Rapid București, helping the club win the 1974–75 Cupa României while playing in Divizia B after eliminating Dinamo București, Jiul Petroșani, Ceahlăul Piatra Neamț, Steaua București and defeating with 2–1 Universitatea Craiova in the final. The team also earned the promotion to the first league at the end of that season. In the following season, Motroc coached Rapid in the 1975–76 European Cup Winners' Cup, where they were eliminated in the first round with 2–1 on aggregate by Anderlecht who eventually won the competition.

He went on to coach FCM Reșița, Politehnica Iași and Chindia Târgoviște in Divizia A, totaling 124 games managed in the competition and 111 in Divizia B. He also had two more spells at Rapid, the first in the 1980–81 Divizia B season and the second during the 1988–89 Divizia A season as an assistant and later head coach.

Motroc also had some spells in Africa at MC Oujda and Raja Casablanca in Morocco and Al-Merrikh in Sudan.

== Personal life ==
He is the father of Florin Motroc, who was also a footballer and a manager, and the grandfather of Vlad Motroc, who played football in the Romanian lower leagues.

== Honours ==
=== Player ===
Dinamo București

- Cupa României: 1958–59

Rapid București

- Divizia A: 1966–67
- Cupa României runner-up: 1960–61, 1961–62, 1967–68
- Balkans Cup: 1963–64, 1964–66

=== Manager ===
Sportul Studențesc București

- Divizia B: 1971–72

Rapid București

- Divizia B: 1974–75
- Cupa României: 1974–75
