= Hugo Pina =

Portuguese footballer (born 1984)

Personal information
- Full name: Hugo Filipe Cabral Pina
- Date of birth: 16 February 1984 (age 42)
- Place of birth: Lisbon, Portugal
- Height: 1.87 m (6 ft 1 1/2 in)
- Position: Defensive midfielder

Team information
- Current team: Universitatea Craiova (scouting director)

Youth career
- 1993–1999: Belenenses
- 1999–2003: Sporting CP

Senior career*
Years	Team	Apps	(Gls)
2002–2004	Sporting CP B	27	(1)
2004–2005	Olivais Moscavide	37	(6)
2005–2006	Córdoba	30	(0)
2007–2008	Olivais Moscavide	30	(1)
2008–2009	Guadalajara	18	(0)
2009–2010	Ribeirão	24	(4)
2010	Lousada	8	(0)
2011	Oriental	10	(2)
2011–2012	Torreense	27	(3)
2012–2014	Atlético	64	(6)
2014–2015	Mafra	28	(5)
2015–2016	União Leiria	11	(2)
2016–2017	Sintrense	17	(3)
2017–2018	1º Dezembro	31	(3)
2018	Casa Pia	0	(0)
2018–2020	Sintrense	47	(3)
Total		409	(39)
- * Club domestic league appearances and goals

Hugo Filipe Cabral Pina (born 16 February 1984) is a Portuguese former professional footballer who played as a defensive midfielder. He is currently scouting director at Liga I club Universitatea Craiova.

== Club career ==
Born in Lisbon, Pina spent some time at Sporting CP's youth academy, making his senior debut with their reserves in the third division. He went on play professionally in the second tier of Portuguese football for C.D. Olivais e Moscavide and Atlético Clube de Portugal.

Abroad, Pina represented Córdoba CF and CD Guadalajara in the Spanish Segunda División B.
