= Nicolae Negrilă =

Romanian footballer

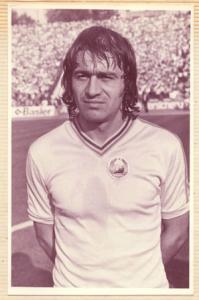

Personal information
- Date of birth: 23 July 1954 (age 72)
- Place of birth: Gighera, Romania
- Position: Right back

Youth career
- 1970–1973: Universitatea Craiova

Senior career*
Years	Team	Apps	(Gls)
1973–1988	Universitatea Craiova	353	(15)
1988–1989	Jiul Petroșani	24	(0)
Total		376	(15)

International career
1980–1987	Romania	27	(1)

Managerial career
- 1992–1993: Constructorul Craiova
- 1995–1996: FC Caracal
- 2002–2003: Gilortul Târgu Cărbunești
- 2003–2004: CSM Reșița
- 2005: Senaco Novaci
- 2006: FC Caracal
Medal record
Universitatea Craiova
Winner	Romanian Cup	1983
- * Club domestic league appearances and goals

Nicolae Negrilă (born 23 July 1954) is a Romanian former professional footballer who played for Universitatea Craiova. He earned 28 caps for the Romania national football team, and participated in UEFA Euro 1984.

== Club career ==
Negrilă, nicknamed "Negoro", was born on 23 July 1954 in Gighera, Romania and began playing junior-level football in 1970 at Universitatea Craiova. He made his Divizia A debut on 19 June 1974 under coach Constantin Cernăianu in Universitatea's 0–0 draw against Petrolul Ploiești. That was his only appearance in that season for which he received a grade 9 in the Sportul newspaper, as the team earned the point that mathematically secured the championship. Negrilă spent 15 seasons with Universitatea, being part of the "Craiova Maxima" generation that won two consecutive league titles in 1980 and 1981. At the first one he contributed with four goals scored in the 22 appearances given to him by coach Valentin Stănescu and in the second he netted once in the 23 matches coach Ion Oblemenco used him. He also won the Cupa României four times, but played in only three finals, scoring once in the 6–0 victory over Politehnica Timișoara in the 1981 final.

Negrilă played 46 games and scored one goal for "U" Craiova in European competitions. In the second round of the 1979–80 UEFA Cup he played in both legs of the 4–0 aggregate win over Leeds United, as Universitatea became the first Romanian club that eliminated a team from England in European competitions. Afterwards, they reached the quarter-finals of the 1981–82 European Cup after eliminating Olympiacos and Kjøbenhavns Boldklub, being eliminated with 3–1 on aggregate by Bayern Munich. He made nine appearances in the 1982–83 UEFA Cup campaign, with Negrilă scoring once in a 1–0 win over Kaiserslautern, which helped them reach the semi-finals where they were eliminated by Benfica on the away goal rule after 1–1 on aggregate. Contributing five matches to the 1984–85 UEFA Cup run, he helped "U" navigate past Real Betis and Olympiacos before they ultimately fell to Željezničar in the round of 16. Negrilă played in a 3–0 win over AS Monaco in the second leg of the first round of the 1985–86 European Cup Winners' Cup, after losing the first leg 2–0. However, they were eliminated in the following round by the eventual winners of the competition, Dynamo Kyiv.

In 1988 he joined Jiul Petroșani in Divizia B, helping the team earn promotion to the first league. Subsequently, Negrilă made his last Divizia A appearance on 5 June 1990 in Jiul's 3–1 home win over FCM Brașov, totaling 377 matches with 15 goals in the competition.

== International career ==
Negrilă played 27 matches and scored one goal for Romania, making his debut on 27 August 1980 under coach Ștefan Kovács in a 4–1 victory against Yugoslavia in the 1977–80 Balkan Cup final. He played seven games in the 1982 World Cup qualifiers and one during the successful Euro 1984 qualifiers. He was used by coach Mircea Lucescu the entire match in the 1–0 loss to Portugal in the Euro 1984 final tournament, as his side failed to progress from their group. Subsequently, he played five games during the 1986 World Cup qualifiers. Negrilă's last two appearances were a 3–1 home win over Spain in the Euro 1988 qualifiers and 3–1 friendly loss to Poland which took place on 2 September 1987.

For representing his country at the Euro 1984 final tournament, Negrilă was decorated by President of Romania Traian Băsescu on 25 March 2008 with the Ordinul "Meritul Sportiv" – (The Medal "The Sportive Merit") class III.

=== International goals ===
Scores and results list Romania's goal tally first, score column indicates score after each Negrilă goal.

List of international goals scored by Nicolae Negrilă
No.	Date	Venue	Opponent	Score	Result	Competition
2	24 August 1983	Stadionul Steaua, Bucharest, Romania	East Germany	1–0	1–0	Friendly

== Managerial career ==
Between 1992 and 2006, Negrilă coached several teams in the Romanian lower leagues such as Constructorul Craiova, FC Caracal, Gilortul Târgu Cărbunești, CSM Reșița and Senaco Novaci.

== Personal life ==
In 2003, Negrilă received the Honorary Citizen of Craiova title.

== Honours ==
Universitatea Craiova

- Divizia A: 1973–74, 1979–80, 1980–81
- Cupa României: 1976–77, 1977–78, 1980–81, 1982–83

Jiul Petroșani

- Divizia B: 1988–89

Romania

- Balkan Cup: 1977–80
