= Gighera =

- Commune
- Location in Romania
- Coordinates: 43°51′N 23°48′E
- Country: Romania
- County: Dolj
- Area: 129.68 km^{2} (50.07 sq mi)
- Population (2021-12-01): 2,899
  - Density: 22.36/km^{2} (57.90/sq mi)
- Time zone: UTC+02:00 (EET)
  - Summer (DST): UTC+03:00 (EEST)
- Vehicle reg.: DJ

Gighera is a commune in Dolj County, Oltenia, Romania with a population of 3,405 people. It is composed of three villages: Gighera, Nedeia and Zăval.
