= Nicolae Ungureanu =

Romanian footballer (1956–2026)

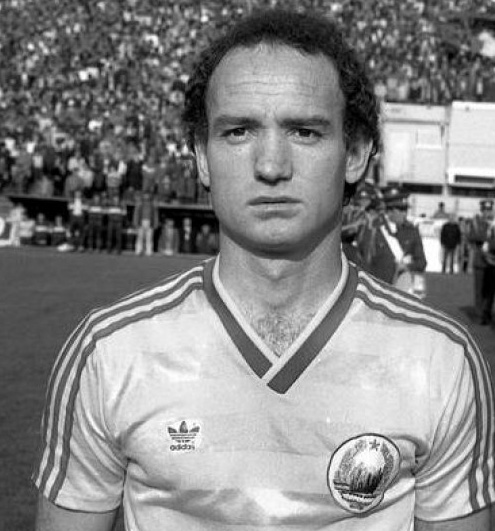
- Ungureanu with the Romania national team

Personal information
- Date of birth: 11 October 1956
- Place of birth: Craiova, Romania
- Date of death: 28 August 2026 (aged 69)
- Place of death: Sadu, Gorj County, Romania
- Height: 1.70 m (5 ft 7 in)
- Position: Left-back

Youth career
- 1973–1975: CSȘ Craiova

Senior career*
Years	Team	Apps	(Gls)
1975–1977	Electroputere Craiova		
1977–1987	Universitatea Craiova	284	(17)
1987–1992	Steaua București	136	(10)
1992–1993	Rapid București	17	(2)
1993–1994	Pandurii Târgu Jiu		
Total		437	(29)

International career
1981–1989	Romania	56	(1)

Managerial career
- 1993–1994: Pandurii Târgu Jiu
- 1994: Electroputere Craiova
- 1996–1997: Drobeta-Turnu Severin
- 1998–1999: Drobeta-Turnu Severin
- 1999: Constructorul Craiova
- 2001: FC Universitatea Craiova
- 2001: Internațional Pitești
- 2004: Oltul Slatina
- 2004–2006: FC Caracal
- 2006: Pandurii Târgu Jiu
- 2006: FC Universitatea Craiova (assistant)
- 2007: FC Caracal
- 2008–2009: Internațional Curtea de Argeș (assistant)
- 2011–2012: Minerul Mătăsari
- 2012–2013: Romania U17
- 2013: FC Podari
- * Club domestic league appearances and goals

Nicolae Ungureanu (11 October 1956 – 28 August 2026) was a Romanian professional footballer who played as a left-back. Having started his career in 1973, he was known for making over fifty appearances for the Romania national football team from 1981 until 1989. Following his professional playing career, Ungureanu was a manager from 1993 until 2013. He was known for managing FC Caracal twice during his managerial career.

== Club career ==
=== Early career ===
Ungureanu, nicknamed "Roșu" (Red) because his face was turning red from physical effort, was born on 11 October 1956 in Craiova, Romania. He began playing junior-level football in 1973 at CSȘ Craiova. He started playing senior-level football in 1975 at Divizia B club Electroputere Craiova.

=== Universitatea Craiova ===
In 1977, Ungureanu went to play for Universitatea Craiova, making his Divizia A debut on 21 August under coach Constantin Deliu in 3–0 home win over Sportul Studențesc București. Ungureanu spent 10 seasons with Universitatea, being part of the "Craiova Maxima" generation that won two consecutive league titles in 1980 and 1981. In each season he played 34 matches and scored one goal under coaches Valentin Stănescu and Ion Oblemenco respectively. He also won the Cupa României three times, playing in all the finals, which were a victory against Olimpia Satu Mare and two wins over Politehnica Timișoara.

Ungureanu played 43 games and scored one goal for "U" Craiova in European competitions. In the second round of the 1979–80 UEFA Cup he played in both legs of the 4–0 aggregate win over Leeds United, as Universitatea became the first Romanian club that eliminated a team from England in European competitions. Afterwards, they reached the quarter-finals of the 1981–82 European Cup after eliminating Olympiacos and Kjøbenhavns Boldklub, being eliminated with 3–1 on aggregate by Bayern Munich. He made nine appearances in the 1982–83 UEFA Cup campaign, with Ungureanu scoring once in a 3–1 win over Fiorentina, which helped them reach the semi-finals where they were eliminated by Benfica on the away goal rule after 1–1 on aggregate. Contributing six matches to the 1984–85 UEFA Cup run, he helped "U" navigate past Real Betis and Olympiacos before they ultimately fell to Željezničar in the round of 16. Ungureanu played in a 3–0 win over AS Monaco in the second leg of the first round of the 1985–86 European Cup Winners' Cup, after losing the first leg 2–0. However, they were eliminated in the following round by the eventual winners of the competition, Dynamo Kyiv.

=== Steaua București ===
In 1987, Ungureanu joined Steaua București and won the title in his first season with coach Anghel Iordănescu, appearing in 24 league matches in which he scored four goals. The team also reached the semi-finals of the European Cup where they lost to Benfica. In the following season, they won The Double, Ungureanu playing 31 league matches and scoring once under Iordănescu, but he did not play in the 1–0 win over Dinamo București in the Cupa României final. In the same season he helped the club reach the 1988–89 European Cup final, playing nine games in the campaign, including the final which was lost 4–0 to AC Milan. His last trophy won with Steaua was the 1991–92 Cupa României, as coach Victor Pițurcă used him as a starter in the penalty shoot-out victory against Politehnica Timișoara in the final. During the same season, he played six games in the UEFA Cup campaign, helping the team get past Anorthosis Famagusta and Sporting Gijón to reach the round of 16 where they were defeated by Genoa.

=== Late career ===
In 1992, Ungureanu went to play for Rapid București. There, he made his last Divizia A appearance on 21 March 1993 in a 5–0 loss to Universitatea Cluj, totaling 437 matches with 29 goals in the competition and 71 games with one goal in European competitions. Subsequently, he was a player-coach during the 1993–94 Divizia C season at Pandurii Târgu Jiu.

== International career ==
Ungureanu played 56 matches and scored one goal for Romania, making his debut on 8 April 1981 under coach Valentin Stănescu in a 2–1 friendly loss to Israel. He played seven games in the successful Euro 1984 qualifiers, including a 1–0 victory against World Cup holders Italy. Coach Mircea Lucescu used him for the entirety of all three games in the final tournament which were a draw against Spain and losses to West Germany and Portugal, as his side failed to progress from their group. Subsequently, he played seven games in the 1986 World Cup qualifiers and five matches with one goal scored in a 3–1 victory against Spain during the Euro 1988 qualifiers. Ungureanu's last appearance for the national team took place on 15 November 1989 in a 3–1 home win over Denmark in the 1990 World Cup qualifiers.

For representing his country at the Euro 1984 final tournament, Ungureanu was decorated by President of Romania Traian Băsescu on 25 March 2008 with the Ordinul "Meritul Sportiv" – (The Medal "The Sportive Merit") class III.

== Managerial career ==
Ungureanu started coaching during the 1993–94 Divizia C season, being a player-coach at Pandurii Târgu Jiu. In 1994 he had his first Divizia A experience, being head coach at Electroputere Craiova. He would go on to have two more spells in the Romanian first league, with the first being in 2001 at FC Universitatea Craiova and the second in 2006 at Pandurii, totaling 32 matches in the competition. However, he spent most of his coaching career in the Romanian lower leagues for teams such as Drobeta-Turnu Severin, Constructorul Craiova, Internațional Pitești, Oltul Slatina, FC Caracal, Minerul Mătăsari and FC Podari, while also having a stint at Romania's under-17 national team. He also worked as an assistant coach at "U" Craiova and Internațional Curtea de Argeș.

== Personal life and death ==
In 2003, Ungureanu received the Honorary Citizen of Craiova title.

Ungureanu died in Sadu, Gorj County, on 28 August 2026, at the age of 69.

== Career statistics ==
Scores and results list Romania's goal tally first, score column indicates score after each Ungureanu goal.

List of international goals scored by Nicolae Ungureanu
No.	Date	Venue	Opponent	Score	Result	Competition
1	29 April 1987	Stadionul Steaua, Bucharest, Romania	Spain	3–0	3–1	Euro 1988 qualifiers

== Honours ==
=== Player ===
Universitatea Craiova

- Divizia A: 1979–80, 1980–81
- Cupa României: 1977–78, 1980–81, 1982–83

Steaua București

- Divizia A: 1987–88, 1988–89
- Cupa României: 1988–89, 1991–92
- European Cup runner-up: 1988–89
