= 1980–81 Divizia A =

63rd season of top-tier football league in Romania

Divizia A
- Season: 1980–81
- Champions: Universitatea Craiova
- Top goalscorer: Marin Radu (28)

The 1980–81 Divizia A was the sixty-third season of Divizia A, the top-level football league of Romania.

== Teams ==
Location of teams in 1980-81 Divizia A

== League table ==
| Pos | Team | Pld | W | D | L | GF | GA | GD | Pts | Qualification or relegation |
|---|---|---|---|---|---|---|---|---|---|---|
| 1 | Universitatea Craiova (C) | 34 | 21 | 4 | 9 | 72 | 33 | +39 | 46 | Qualification to European Cup first round |
| 2 | Dinamo București | 34 | 18 | 7 | 9 | 57 | 34 | +23 | 43 | Qualification to UEFA Cup first round |
| 3 | Argeș Pitești | 34 | 19 | 4 | 11 | 63 | 39 | +24 | 42 | Qualification to UEFA Cup first round |
| 4 | Steaua București | 34 | 15 | 8 | 11 | 50 | 45 | +5 | 38 | Invitation to Balkans Cup |
| 5 | Sportul Studenţesc București | 34 | 17 | 2 | 15 | 54 | 35 | +19 | 36 | |
| 6 | Corvinul Hunedoara | 34 | 16 | 3 | 15 | 72 | 48 | +24 | 35 | |
| 7 | Olt Scornicești | 34 | 14 | 7 | 13 | 44 | 49 | −5 | 35 | |
| 8 | FCM Brașov | 34 | 14 | 6 | 14 | 35 | 41 | −6 | 34 | |
| 9 | Chimia Râmnicu Vâlcea | 34 | 15 | 4 | 15 | 51 | 60 | −9 | 34 | |
| 10 | Jiul Petroșani | 34 | 14 | 5 | 15 | 44 | 41 | +3 | 33 | |
| 11 | SC Bacău | 34 | 14 | 5 | 15 | 46 | 51 | −5 | 33 | |
| 12 | Politehnica Timișoara | 34 | 13 | 7 | 14 | 33 | 46 | −13 | 33 | Qualification to Cup Winners' Cup preliminary round |
| 13 | ASA Târgu Mureș | 34 | 14 | 4 | 16 | 50 | 56 | −6 | 32 | |
| 14 | Universitatea Cluj | 34 | 14 | 4 | 16 | 47 | 57 | −10 | 32 | |
| 15 | Progresul București | 34 | 13 | 6 | 15 | 39 | 50 | −11 | 32 | |
| 16 | Politehnica Iași (R) | 34 | 12 | 6 | 16 | 44 | 53 | −9 | 30 | Relegation to Divizia B |
| 17 | FC Baia Mare (R) | 34 | 10 | 6 | 18 | 37 | 62 | −25 | 26 | Relegation to Divizia B |
| 18 | FCM Galați (R) | 34 | 7 | 4 | 23 | 34 | 72 | −38 | 18 | Relegation to Divizia B |

Source: LT
Rules for classification: 1) points; 2) goal difference; 3) number of goals scored
(C) Champions; (R) Relegated

=== Results ===
| Home \ Away | ASA | ARG | BAC | BAI | BRA | COR | UCR | DIN | GAL | JIU | OLT | PIA | PRO | RAM | SPO | STE | POL | UCL |
|---|---|---|---|---|---|---|---|---|---|---|---|---|---|---|---|---|---|---|
| ASA Târgu Mureș | — | 2–0 | 2–2 | 2–0 | 3–1 | 0–0 | 1–4 | 2–0 | 5–0 | 2–1 | 2–1 | 5–1 | 2–0 | 3–3 | 1–0 | 3–1 | 3–0 | 2–0 |
| Argeș Pitești | 2–0 | — | 5–2 | 5–0 | 1–0 | 6–0 | 0–1 | 2–1 | 2–1 | 3–1 | 7–0 | 2–1 | 2–1 | 3–1 | 1–0 | 3–1 | 0–0 | 2–0 |
| Bacău | 4–0 | 4–0 | — | 2–0 | 2–0 | 2–1 | 1–1 | 1–3 | 2–0 | 2–0 | 3–1 | 2–0 | 1–0 | 1–0 | 1–3 | 0–4 | 2–0 | 1–0 |
| Baia Mare | 1–0 | 0–0 | 2–0 | — | 1–1 | 3–1 | 0–0 | 1–0 | 1–0 | 2–2 | 0–1 | 2–0 | 2–0 | 5–0 | 0–0 | 5–0 | 1–1 | 1–2 |
| Brașov | 1–0 | 2–1 | 0–2 | 2–0 | — | 1–0 | 1–0 | 3–1 | 2–1 | 1–0 | 2–1 | 2–1 | 0–0 | 1–0 | 2–0 | 0–1 | 2–0 | 3–1 |
| Corvinul Hunedoara | 4–1 | 4–0 | 4–1 | 6–1 | 2–0 | — | 4–3 | 1–2 | 7–0 | 1–0 | 4–2 | 8–0 | 3–1 | 3–1 | 0–1 | 1–1 | 4–0 | 1–2 |
| Universitatea Craiova | 3–0 | 3–2 | 6–2 | 2–0 | 4–0 | 2–1 | — | 2–0 | 3–1 | 2–0 | 2–0 | 2–0 | 1–0 | 4–0 | 2–0 | 1–1 | 4–1 | 7–0 |
| Dinamo București | 2–1 | 2–1 | 0–0 | 3–1 | 3–0 | 1–0 | 1–1 | — | 3–1 | 3–0 | 3–0 | 4–0 | 4–0 | 2–1 | 0–2 | 0–2 | 2–0 | 2–1 |
| Galați | 1–0 | 0–1 | 2–0 | 4–0 | 1–1 | 1–1 | 1–2 | 0–2 | — | 1–0 | 1–2 | 0–5 | 1–2 | 3–0 | 3–0 | 1–2 | 2–0 | 1–1 |
| Jiul Petroșani | 2–1 | 3–3 | 1–0 | 4–1 | 1–1 | 1–0 | 2–1 | 2–1 | 4–0 | — | 4–0 | 0–0 | 4–2 | 1–0 | 1–0 | 2–0 | 3–0 | 3–0 |
| Olt Scornicești | 3–0 | 2–1 | 3–0 | 2–0 | 3–1 | 1–3 | 0–1 | 1–1 | 4–2 | 1–0 | — | 3–0 | 1–1 | 0–0 | 1–0 | 2–0 | 1–2 | 5–2 |
| Politehnica Iași | 3–1 | 0–1 | 0–0 | 2–0 | 0–0 | 2–0 | 2–1 | 2–0 | 1–1 | 4–0 | 3–0 | — | 3–0 | 1–0 | 3–0 | 3–3 | 1–1 | 1–0 |
| Progresul București | 3–1 | 1–1 | 1–0 | 0–3 | 3–1 | 1–2 | 3–2 | 1–1 | 3–1 | 1–0 | 1–1 | 1–0 | — | 5–2 | 1–0 | 0–1 | 3–0 | 1–0 |
| Chimia Râmnicu Vâlcea | 4–0 | 1–0 | 4–2 | 2–1 | 1–0 | 3–2 | 5–4 | 0–2 | 3–1 | 3–0 | 0–0 | 2–1 | 3–1 | — | 0–3 | 1–0 | 2–1 | 3–1 |
| Sportul Studențesc București | 3–0 | 1–3 | 4–2 | 8–1 | 1–0 | 1–2 | 2–0 | 0–3 | 3–1 | 2–1 | 2–0 | 4–2 | 4–0 | 0–1 | — | 0–2 | 1–0 | 6–0 |
| Steaua București | 1–1 | 1–0 | 1–1 | 3–1 | 2–2 | 3–1 | 0–1 | 1–1 | 4–1 | 2–1 | 1–1 | 3–1 | 0–1 | 4–2 | 1–3 | — | 1–0 | 2–0 |
| Politehnica Timișoara | 3–1 | 1–0 | 1–0 | 3–1 | 2–1 | 1–0 | 1–0 | 3–3 | 2–0 | 0–0 | 0–1 | 2–1 | 1–1 | 1–1 | 1–0 | 2–1 | — | 3–2 |
| Universitatea Cluj | 2–3 | 2–3 | 2–1 | 4–0 | 2–1 | 3–1 | 1–0 | 1–1 | 4–1 | 1–0 | 0–0 | 3–0 | 2–0 | 4–2 | 0–0 | 3–0 | 1–0 | — |

Source: LT (in Romanian)
Legend: Blue = home team win; Yellow = draw; Red = away team win.

== Top goalscorers ==
| Position | Player | Club | Goals |
|---|---|---|---|
| 1 | Marin Radu | Argeş Piteşti | 28 |
| 2 | Rodion Cămătaru | Universitatea Craiova | 23 |
| 3 | Mircea Sandu | Sportul Studenţesc | 20 |
| 4 | Septimiu Câmpeanu | Universitatea Cluj | 19 |
| 5 | Ioan Petcu | Corvinul Hunedoara | 17 |

== Champion squad ==
Universitatea Craiova

Goalkeepers: Gabriel Boldici (18 / 0); Silviu Lung (20 / 0).
Defenders: Nicolae Negrilă (23 / 1); Petre Purima (15 / 0); Nicolae Tilihoi (27 / 0); Costică Ștefănescu (31 / 2); Nicolae Ungureanu (34 / 1); Grigore Ciupitu (20 / 0); Adrian Popescu (1 / 0); Florin Cioroianu (1 / 0).
Midfielders: Aurel Țicleanu (29 / 2); Costică Donose (32 / 6); Ilie Balaci (29 / 12); Ion Geolgău (29 / 3); Aurel Beldeanu (17 / 1); Liviu Dorel Firănescu (1 / 0).
Forwards: Mircea Irimescu (21 / 4); Zoltan Crișan (29 / 10); Rodion Cămătaru (33 / 23); Sorin Cârțu (25 / 7); Dorel Păuna (2 / 0).
(league appearances and goals listed in brackets)

Manager: Ion Oblemenco.

== Attendances ==
| No. | Club | Average |
|---|---|---|
| 1 | Craiova | 22,529 |
| 2 | Braşov | 17,118 |
| 3 | Timişoara | 14,912 |
| 4 | Dinamo 1948 | 14,471 |
| 5 | Argeş | 14,353 |
| 6 | U Cluj | 13,529 |
| 7 | Progresul | 13,059 |
| 8 | Steaua | 11,529 |
| 9 | Dunărea | 11,412 |
| 10 | Hunedoara | 11,176 |
| 11 | Rāmnicu Vālcea | 10,824 |
| 12 | Bacău | 10,588 |
| 13 | Baia Mare | 10,471 |
| 14 | Tīrgu Mureş | 10,471 |
| 15 | Iaşi | 9,353 |
| 16 | Sportul Studenţesc | 9,276 |
| 17 | Olt Scorniceşti | 7,147 |
| 18 | Jiul | 6,000 |

== See also ==
- 1980–81 Divizia B
