= 1973–74 Divizia A =

56th season of top-tier football league in Romania

Divizia A
- Season: 1973–74
- Champions: Universitatea Craiova
- Top goalscorer: Mihai Adam (23)

The 1973–74 Divizia A was the fifty-sixth season of Divizia A, the top-level football league of Romania.

== Teams ==
Location of teams in 1973-74 Divizia A

== League table ==
Pos	Team	Pld	W	D	L	GF	GA	GD	Pts	Qualification or relegation
1	Universitatea Craiova (C)	34	20	5	9	63	37	+26	45	Qualification to European Cup first round
2	Dinamo București	34	18	8	8	60	34	+26	44	Qualification to UEFA Cup first round
3	Steagul Roşu Brașov	34	15	9	10	36	25	+11	39	Qualification to UEFA Cup first round
4	FC Constanța	34	16	6	12	47	33	+14	38	Invitation to Balkans Cup
5	UTA Arad	34	15	6	13	42	45	−3	36	
6	Steaua București	34	13	9	12	46	42	+4	35	
7	Politehnica Timișoara	34	12	10	12	41	45	−4	34	
8	Argeș Pitești	34	14	6	14	45	57	−12	34	
9	CSM Reșița	34	11	11	12	45	40	+5	33	
10	Universitatea Cluj	34	12	9	13	35	37	−2	33	
11	Sportul Studențesc București	34	12	8	14	43	41	+2	32	
12	ASA Târgu Mureș	34	13	6	15	38	51	−13	32	
13	Politehnica Iași	34	13	5	16	39	50	−11	31	
14	CFR Cluj	34	11	9	14	40	53	−13	31	
15	Jiul Petroșani	34	12	6	16	40	42	−2	30	Qualification to Cup Winners' Cup first round
16	Rapid București (R)	34	9	12	13	30	38	−8	30	Relegation to Divizia B
17	SC Bacău (R)	34	12	4	18	40	49	−9	28	Relegation to Divizia B
18	Petrolul Ploiești (R)	34	10	7	17	31	42	−11	27	Relegation to Divizia B

Source: LT
Rules for classification: 1) points; 2) goal difference; 3) number of goals scored
(C) Champions; (R) Relegated

=== Results ===
Home \ Away	ASA	ARG	BAC	CFR	RES	CON	UCR	DIN	JIU	PET	PIA	RAP	SPO	SRB	STE	POL	UTA	UCL
ASA Târgu Mureș	—	0–2	3–2	3–1	3–0	1–0	3–0	0–0	2–0	1–0	0–1	1–0	2–0	0–0	2–1	2–1	0–0	2–0
Argeș Pitești	4–2	—	1–0	3–0	1–1	2–1	2–1	3–2	0–2	2–1	5–2	2–0	2–1	1–2	1–1	0–1	0–0	1–0
Bacău	4–2	2–0	—	3–1	2–0	2–2	3–4	2–1	3–0	1–0	4–0	1–3	1–0	1–0	1–0	0–0	0–0	2–1
CFR Cluj	1–0	2–0	2–0	—	3–3	0–1	2–1	1–1	3–1	2–1	0–0	3–1	1–1	1–0	4–0	1–0	0–1	3–3
Reșița	4–2	2–0	1–0	0–0	—	1–2	2–1	2–1	4–1	5–1	2–2	0–0	2–0	2–0	1–1	2–2	2–0	1–0
Constanța	1–2	3–0	1–0	5–1	1–0	—	4–0	0–0	1–0	1–0	2–0	4–0	0–0	1–0	2–1	3–3	2–1	2–0
Universitatea Craiova	2–0	4–1	1–0	5–0	3–1	2–1	—	1–1	5–1	2–0	1–0	3–1	3–1	2–0	2–0	0–0	3–0	3–2
Dinamo București	5–1	7–0	2–0	3–1	2–1	1–1	1–0	—	1–0	2–0	5–2	1–1	0–3	3–2	0–2	2–1	4–1	0–1
Jiul Petroșani	4–0	3–1	1–0	4–1	2–1	0–1	1–1	1–1	—	0–0	1–0	3–0	1–0	2–0	1–1	4–1	2–2	1–2
Petrolul Ploiești	2–2	4–1	1–1	2–1	1–0	1–0	0–0	2–1	2–1	—	0–1	1–1	2–1	0–1	2–0	0–0	4–1	0–0
Politehnica Iași	4–1	1–1	3–0	1–0	0–0	1–0	3–4	0–1	1–0	2–0	—	1–0	1–0	1–0	1–1	1–0	4–1	0–2
Rapid București	2–0	2–1	1–0	1–1	0–0	1–1	1–1	0–1	1–0	2–0	3–1	—	0–1	1–1	2–0	1–1	2–1	0–0
Sportul Studențesc București	1–0	3–0	4–0	2–0	2–1	3–2	1–0	0–2	2–2	1–2	3–1	1–1	—	2–1	0–1	2–0	2–2	1–1
Steagul Roşu Brașov	0–0	1–1	3–1	3–0	1–0	1–0	2–0	0–0	1–0	3–0	1–0	1–0	1–1	—	1–0	2–1	2–0	3–0
Steaua București	1–1	0–3	5–2	1–0	1–1	4–1	1–0	1–3	2–0	1–0	4–1	3–2	4–2	2–2	—	2–0	3–0	1–1
Politehnica Timișoara	3–1	5–2	3–1	0–0	3–2	1–0	0–2	3–1	1–0	3–2	2–1	1–0	1–1	1–1	1–1	—	1–3	1–0
UTA Arad	2–0	1–1	1–0	1–2	2–0	2–0	2–4	1–2	1–0	1–0	3–1	2–0	2–0	1–0	1–0	3–0	—	1–0
Universitatea Cluj	2–0	0–1	2–1	2–2	1–1	2–1	0–1	0–3	0–1	1–0	3–1	0–0	2–1	0–0	1–0	2–0	4–2	—

Source: LT (in Romanian)
Legend: Blue = home team win; Yellow = draw; Red = away team win.

== Top goalscorers ==
Rank	Player	Club	Goals
1	Mihai Adam	CFR Cluj	23
2	Dudu Georgescu	Dinamo București	21
3	Iulian Bălan	Universitatea Craiova	19
3	Florea Dumitrache	Dinamo București	19
3	Viorel Năstase	Steaua București	19

== Champion squad ==
Universitatea Craiova

Goalkeepers: Paul Manta (12 / 0); Florin Oprea (23 / 0).
Defenders: Victor Niculescu (28 / 0); Dragu Bădin (25 / 0); Petre Deselnicu (33 / 2); Ion Velea (14 / 1); Cornel Berneanu (23 / 0); Alexandru Boc (32 / 1); Nicolae Negrilă (1 / 0); Mircea Chivu (1 / 0).
Midfielders: Lucian Strâmbeanu (33 / 0); Nicolae Ivan (9 / 2); Ilie Balaci (27 / 3); Ion Constantinescu (1 / 0); Costică Ștefănescu (20 / 0).
Forwards: Iulian Bălan (32 / 19); Ion Niță (29 / 2); Ion Oblemenco (29 / 14); Teodor Țarălungă (31 / 11); Dumitru Marcu (24 / 7); Constantin Pană (1 / 0); Ion Stăncescu (3 / 0); Ioan Kiss (2 / 0).
(league appearances and goals listed in brackets)

Manager: Constantin Cernăianu.

== Attendances ==
No.	Club	Average
1	Craiova	31,176
2	FC Rapid	22,882
3	Timişoara	21,588
4	Dinamo 1948	21,471
5	Steaua	21,294
6	Sportul Studenţesc	20,447
7	Reşiţa	14,882
8	Constanţa	12,706
9	UTA Arad	11,765
10	Petrolul	11,118
11	Târgu Mureș	10,706
12	CFR Cluj	10,147
13	Bacău	10,118
14	Iaşi	10,000
15	U Cluj	9,735
16	Argeş	9,353
17	Braşov	9,029
18	Jiul	4,441

== See also ==
- 1973–74 Divizia B
- 1973–74 Divizia C
