= CS Universitatea Craiova =

Romanian football club

Universitatea Craiova
- Full name: U Craiova 1948 Club Sportiv SA (Note: The club adopted its current name in 2018, however the following year it formally requested to instead use the "Universitatea Craiova" trademark in all competitions it participates in.)
- Nicknames: Alb-albaștrii (The White-Blues); Juveții (The Oltenia People); Știința (The Science); Campioana unei mari iubiri (The Champion of a Great Love); Leii din Bănie (The Lions from Bănie); Studenții (The Students)
- Short name: U Craiova
- Founded: 5 September 1948; 78 years ago (as UNSR Craiova); 2013; 13 years ago (refounding)
- Ground: Ion Oblemenco
- Capacity: 30,983
- Owners: Mihai Rotaru (65%); Other shareholders (35%)
- Chairman: Mihai Rotaru
- Head coach: Filipe Coelho
- League: Liga I
- 2025–26: Liga I, 1st of 16 (champions)
- Website: ucv1948.ro
Home colours	Away colours	Third colours

U Craiova 1948 Club Sportiv, commonly known as Universitatea Craiova (Romanian pronunciation: [universiˈtate̯a kraˈjova]), CS U Craiova, U Craiova, or simply Craiova, is a Romanian professional football club based in Craiova, Dolj County. It competes in the Liga I, the top tier of the Romanian league system.

Initially founded in 1948 as the football section of the CSU Craiova sports organisation, it remained within the structure until 1991, when its league place was taken by FC U Craiova following privatisation. Between 1948 and 1991, the club won four championship titles and five national cups. After a series of reorganisations and the eventual disaffiliation of FC U, the sports club re-established its football section in 2013. The current entity asserts the honours of the original Universitatea Craiova, a position recognised by several court rulings and the LPF, although they remain disputed by an also re-established FC U Craiova side. (Note: As of November 2017, LPF attributes all Universitatea Craiova trophies won between 1948 and 1991 to the CS U entity. FC U's only major trophy is the 1992–93 Cupa României, although this is also claimed by the former. A separate ruling in 2018 indicated that neither entity definitively holds the original honours.) In 2018, Craiova won the national cup, its first trophy following refoundation, and in 2021 secured its first Supercupa României. In the 2025–26 season, it ended a 35-year drought and won its fifth Liga I title.

In European competitions, Craiova reached the semi-finals of the 1982–83 UEFA Cup and the quarter-finals of the 1981–82 European Cup. It was the first Romanian team to reach the semi-finals of a UEFA competition and remains the only one to have eliminated teams from each of the five major European leagues—England, France, Germany, Italy, and Spain. In the 2025–26 season, the club qualified for the league phase of a European competition for the first time, following success in the Conference League play-off round.

"The White-Blues" play their home matches at the Stadionul Ion Oblemenco, which has a capacity of 30,983. The club maintains several longstanding rivalries, most notably with Dinamo București. The rivalry intensified towards the end of the 1972–73 campaign, when both teams finished level on points and Dinamo secured the championship on goal difference.

== History ==
=== Early years of football in Craiova (1921–1958) ===
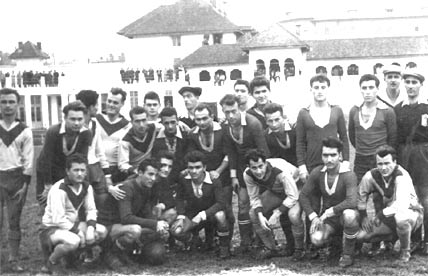
UNSR Craiova in 1948

Football in the city of Craiova began in 1921 when the first two teams were founded: Craiovan Craiova and Rovine Grivița Craiova. In 1940, the two sides merged in what resulted to be one of the most successful Romanian clubs of the Interwar period, FC Craiova, who were the first team of the city that won the Romanian football championship. However, the 1942–43 title is not recognized officially by FRF and LPF.

Following the birth of university education in Craiova, a group of teachers and students founded CSU (Club Sportiv Universitar) Craiova in 1948, a sports club with athletics, volleyball, handball, table tennis, chess sections, and under the coordination of the Ministry of Public Education and the Uniunea Națională a Studenților din România (lit. National Union of Students in Romania), the football section was initially formed under the name UNSR Craiova and enrolled in the county championship. The first official match was held at Filiași, aganinst CFR Filiași, on 5 September 1948, with the Students being defeated 3–6. The team, led by head coach Nicolae Polojinski, wore white-and-blue shirts and was composed of Dumitrescu – Rădulescu, Mihăilă I, Carli – Ozon, Mihăilă II – Sabin, Ilie, Bădescu, Tudor, and Serghi.

In 1950, the football section changed its name from UNSR Craiova to CSU Craiova, the same name as its parent club. The early squads coached by Nicolae Polojinski included, among others, Vulpe, I. Popescu, Zorilă, Stănculescu, Brebenaru, Gh. Florigoanță, Șerbu, A. Bratu, Cricitoiu, Florescu, I. Florigoanță, Borosan, Dilă, and Cumpănașu.

In 1951, CSU Craiova recorded a 6–0 victory over Constructorul Craiova in what was also the club’s first official appearance in Cupa României. Two years later, the club was renamed Știința Craiova and reached the Round of 32 of Cupa României, where it was eliminated by Spartac București after a 2–2 draw following extra time, with the away team advancing according to the competition rules. The squad featured players such as Stoica, Dreșcă, Rizu, Pîrvuleț, Firu, Anuțescu, Dan Popescu, Dumitru Popescu, Babarada, Dilă, and Pădureanu.

The following season, under coach Nicolae Oțeleanu, Știința once again reached the Round of 32 in Cupa României, before narrowly losing 0–1 to Locomotiva Timișoara. They also won the Craiova Regional Championship, securing promotion to Divizia B for the first time in its history after finishing first in the promotion tournament held in Arad.

However, their spell in the second division lasted only one season, as they finished in 12th place in Series I and were relegated to the newly re-established Divizia C, with a squad that included Stoica, Urucu, Vulpe, Dreșcă, Rizu, Pîrvuleț, Razga, Dumitrescu, Ciulava, Anuțescu, Briac, Lambru, Căpitanu, Buldur, Ioniță, D. Popescu, V. Popescu, V. Lupu, Firu, Babarada, Pădureanu, Pantelimon, Iliescu, Coicea, and Matei.

Chronology of names
Name	Period
UNSR Craiova	1948–1950
CSU Craiova	1950–1953
Știința Craiova	1953–1962
CSO Craiova	1962–1963
Știința Craiova	1963–1966
Universitatea Craiova	1966–1991
Universitatea Craiova	2013–present

=== Universitatea, a rising team (1958–1970) ===
In the following years, under the guidance of Bondoc Ionescu-Crum, the Students finished in 3rd place in Series IV of the 1956 season before securing a return to the second tier in the 1957–58 campaign. Știința won Series III after a tight battle for first place with Unirea Râmnicu Vâlcea, the two sides finishing tied on 34 points, with the White and Blues clinching promotion on goal average. The promotion-winning squad included Stoica, Matei, Căpitanu, Iliescu, Dumitrescu, Briac, Lambru, Scorțan, Anghel, Buldur, Croitoru, Coicea, Pantelimon, Dică, and Deliu.

In their first season after returning to Divizia B, coach Bondoc Ionescu-Crum was replaced during the first half of the season by Gheorghe Scăeșteanu, who led Știința to a 13th place finish out of 14 teams in Series I, avoiding relegation due to the expansion of the second division. Moved to Series II for the following campaign, the Students gradually established themselves among the division's leading sides, finishing in 10th place in 1959–60 under Scăeșteanu.

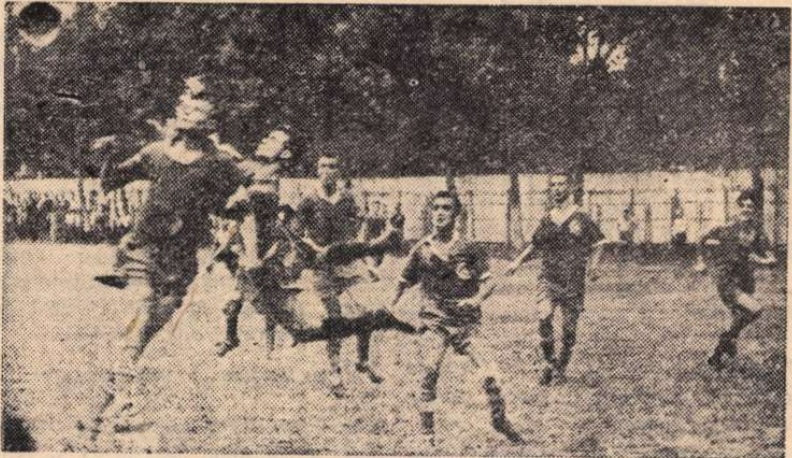
League match between Dinamo București and Știința Craiova in August 1959

In 1960–61, Virgil Mărdărescu was appointed as the new head coach, leading the White and Blues to a runner-up finish, nine points behind Dinamo Pitești. In 1961, former Romanian international Valeriu Călinoiu was appointed head coach, guiding the team to a 4th place finish in the 1961–62 season.

In 1962, the team was renamed CSO (Club Sportiv Orășenesc) Craiova, and Călinoiu was replaced after the first half of the season by Nicolae Oțeleanu, who led the team to a 5th place finish in the 1962–63 season.

The reorganization of Divizia B ahead of the 1963–64 season returned Știința to Series I, where the Students became involved in a four-way battle for promotion, finishing first, tied on points with runners-up Metalul Târgoviște and one point ahead of 3rd-place Poiana Câmpina, and three points ahead of 4th-place Dinamo Bacău. The historic promotion to Divizia A was achieved under the guidance of Nicolae Oțeleanu, with a squad that included Dumitrescu, Vasilescu, Geleriu, Lungan, Deliu, Bărbulescu, Tetea, Ganga, Anton, Lovin, Onea, Vișan, Stanciu, Papuc, C. Stănescu, and A. Stănescu.

The first season in Divizia A was challenging for the Students, who avoided relegation in the final rounds, finishing 11th, just one point above the first relegated team, Minerul Baia Mare. By the end of the following season, Știința had climbed to 8th place, laying the foundations of a side capable of challenging for the title.

In the summer of 1966, the club was renamed from Știința Craiova to Universitatea Craiova. Nevertheless, supporters continued to include in their chants and their encouragements the name Știința. Universitatea supporters tend to chant Hei, hei, hai Știința! at times of loss.

As Universitatea experienced seasons of contrasting results, the team alternated between challenging near the top of the table and more modest campaigns, but managed to remain in the first division throughout the period, finishing 3rd in 1966–67, 11th in 1967–68, 7th in 1968–69, and 4th in 1969–70.

=== "The Champion of a Great Love" (1970–1979) ===
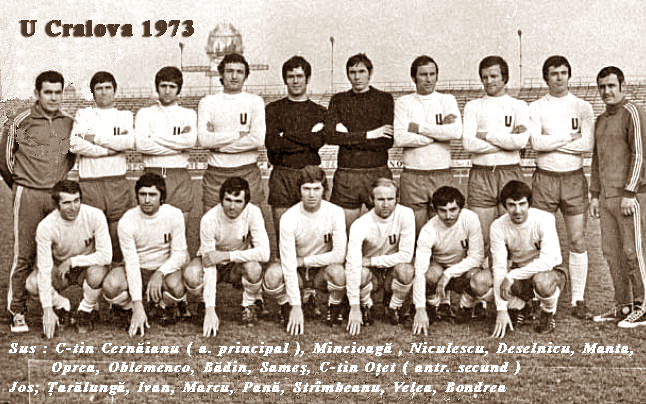
U Craiova in the 1972–73 season

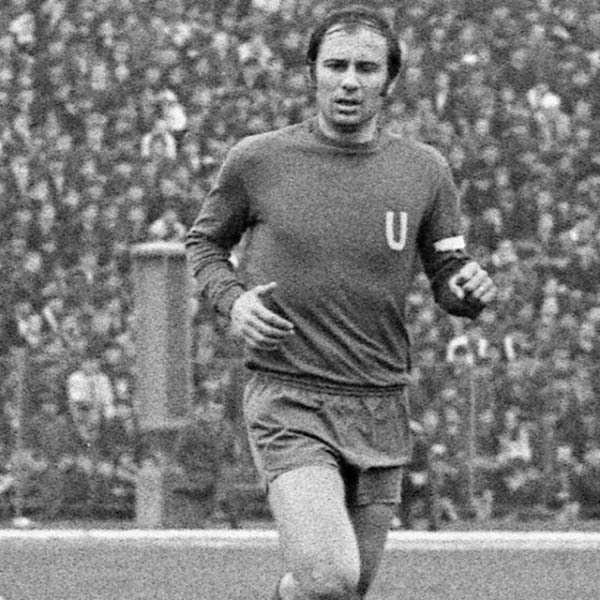
Ion Oblemenco, one of the club symbols

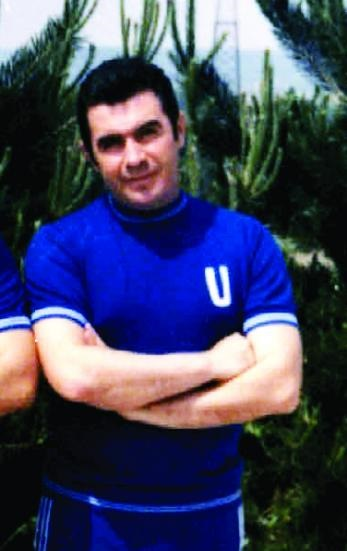
Constantin Cernăianu led the club to its first league title in 1974

Craiova started the 1970s with a team built around Ion Oblemenco, Petre Deselnicu, Teodor Țarălungă, Lucian Strâmbeanu and Dumitru Marcu, among others. The start of the decade had the club in 6th place at the end of the 1970–71 season and 8th place at the end of the 1971–72. In the 1972–73 season, they finished at the same number of points with Dinamo București, but lost the championship on goal difference. The season coined a new nickname, "the Champion of a Great Love", a nickname created by the poet Adrian Păunescu, a big fan of the team from Bănie, named Dinamo only as the champion of the country, indicating that Craiova lost the title.

In the 1973–74 season, the title fight was again between Universitatea and Dinamo. Craiova won the title by a point from Dinamo, with Craiova becoming the first university team to win a national title in Europe. Dinamo was considered to be the pet team of the communist regime, which often influenced the results as well and after the last season's incidents, Universitatea was increasingly seen as a representative of the people and simple man in the struggle with the communist regime, of pure football and football played on the pitch against the one dominated by arrangements and influences, so the nickname had gained a reputation. The squad that won the first title was coached by Constantin Cernăianu and Constantin Oțet and had the following players included: Oprea, Manta – Niculescu, Bădin, Deselnicu, Velea, Strâmbeanu, Ivan, Niță, Balaci, Berneanu, Țarălungă, Oblemenco, Bălan, Pană, Boc, Ștefănescu, Marcu, Stăncescu, Kiss, Chivu, Negrilă and Constantinescu.

The 1974–75 season brought a first UEFA European Cup presence against Swedish team Åtvidaberg, who lost 3–4 on aggregate but ranked third place at the end of the championship. The 1975–76 season had the team rank sixth place and announcing a generational change. For the last season of Ion Oblemenco, the team from Craiova won the Romanian Cup for the first time in its history in a final against Steaua București. In the Divizia A, the team finished in 3rd place.

With the generational exchange made, Universitatea continued to impress in 1978 by defending its Romanian Cup trophy, won a year before against Olimpia Satu Mare and a sixth place in the league. The 1978–79 season ended with fourth place and in the UEFA Cup Winners' Cup, Fortuna Düsseldorf eliminated the team in the first round.

=== Craiova Maxima (1979–1991) ===
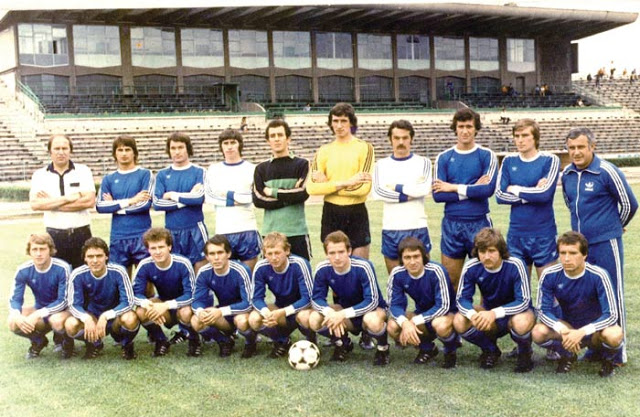
U Craiova in the 1980–81 season, when they won the Double

Craiova Maxima (The Maximum Craiova) was the second generation of Universitatea. It was a squad composed of many players who grew up close to the first golden team and formed the basis of the Romania national football team including: Ilie Balaci, Rodion Cămătaru, Costică Ștefănescu, Zoltan Crișan, Ion Geolgău, Aurel Beldeanu, Costică Donose and Silviu Lung, among others.

At the end of the 1979–80 season, it was crowned the champion of Romania for the second time. The squad consisted of Boldici, Lung – Negrilă, Tilihoi, Ștefănescu, Ungureanu, Balaci, Beldeanu, Crişan, Donose, Cămătaru, Geolgău, Cârțu, Irimescu, Purima and Ciupitu – with coaches Valentin Stănescu and Ion Oblemenco. Universitatea's UEFA Cup campaign eliminated Wiener SC and Leeds United until it was beaten in the third round by German football club Borussia Mönchengladbach, 1–2 on aggregate.

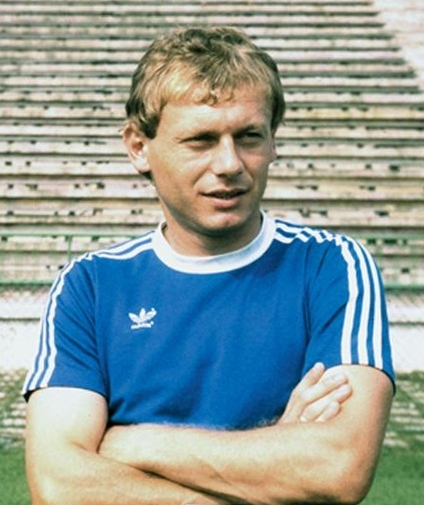
Ilie Balaci, a member of both Universitatea golden teams, was named Romanian Footballer of the Year in 1981 and 1982.

In the 1980–81 season, the team was managing the historical double, the cup, and the championship. As a result of this performance, the students qualified for the 1981–82 European Cup, where Craiova Maxima became more and more visible by eliminating Olympiacos and KB, being stopped in the quarter-finals by Bayern Munich, 1–3 in aggregate, a historical performance for the Romanian football at that time.

The long-standing presence in the European Cups affected the team, which finished only on second place. They later qualified in the UEFA Cup throughout the 1982–83 season, being the first team in the history of Romania that qualified in a European Cup semi-finals. Under the management of Constantin Oțet and Nicolae Ivan, the team took out Fiorentina (Serie A runners-up), Bordeaux, and Kaiserslautern. In the semi-final, Universitatea encountered Benfica, two times European champions and three times European Cup finalists at that time. After two draws, the Portuguese side advanced to the final on aggregate away goals. In the Divizia A, the team finished again in second place.

Throughout the rest of the 1980s, Universitatea Craiova ranked in the following places: 1983–84 (3rd), 1984–85 (4th), 1985–86 (3rd), 1986–87 (5th), 1987–88 (5th), 1988–89 (5th), and 1988–89 (3rd). The team had a constant presence in the European Cups eliminating teams such as Real Betis, Olympiacos, AS Monaco and Galatasaray, but they never got past the third round. The Students also lost a Romanian Cup final in 1985, 1–2 against Steaua București.

In 1991, CS Universitatea Craiova had its last Romanian cup. Prunea, Mănăilă, Săndoi, Ad. Popescu, Mogoşanu, Ciurea, Olaru, Cristescu, Zamfir, Badea, Pigulea, Agalliu, Craioveanu and Neagoe were the last players that have kissed the championship trophy, along with coaches Sorin Cârţu and Ștefan Cioacă.

=== FC Universitatea Craiova (1991–2011) ===
Chart of CS Universitatea Craiova's league performance 1955–2018

In 1991, Universitatea Craiova conquered its last national title and Romanian Cup, under the management of Sorin Cârțu.

However, in the same year, the CS Universitatea Craiova sports club dissolved its football section, and Fotbal Club Universitatea Craiova continued its tradition until the early 2010s—until 1994, the club was still controlled by the Ministry of National Education. FC U won a Romanian Cup in 1993 and reached three finals, in 1994, 1998, and 2000. There was faulty management during the 1990s and early 2000s, which led to the 2005 relegation, when 41 consecutive years of Divizia A were celebrated.

On 20 July 2011, the club was temporarily excluded by the Romanian Football Federation for failing to withdraw their dispute with former coach Victor Pițurcă from a civil court, as per article 57 of the FRF statute which states that the Football Federation solves all the sports lawsuits. However, the article allows disputes regarding employment contracts to be adjudicated in civil court. The exclusion decision was approved by the FRF General Assembly on 14 May 2012. All of the squad players were declared free agents and later signed with other clubs.

=== Rebranding (2013–present) ===
I believe that this team [CS U Craiova] is the successor of the one established in 1948, under the auspices of the Senate of the University of Craiova.

— Corneliu Andrei Stroe, club president during the Craiova Maxima era, on 26 August 2013

On 20 July 2011, the Romanian Football Federation decided to disaffiliate with FC Universitatea Craiova, but the decision was found controversial in court. Consequently, in the summer of 2013, local authorities of Craiova, supported by Pavel Badea and associated with Club Sportiv U Craiova SA (CS U), reestablished the football section of CS U Craiova. CS U claimed that it owns all of the Universitatea honours, and that the sports club did not offer its records to FC U Craiova, which was considered a new club; this was confirmed in justice in June 2016 and reaffirmed by LPF in November 2017. CS Universitatea Craiova is the rightful owner of the brand and records – accepting the 1992–93 Cupa României, claimed but not officially part of CS U's honours.

The striped crest was used on the home shirt between 2013 and 2015, and on the away shirt until 2017.

On 14 August 2013, CS Universitatea Craiova was provisionally affiliated to the Romanian Football Federation, following complications with a licensing file. After resolving the issues, the club was introduced in Liga II, the second tier of the Romanian league system. Universitatea made its season debut on 27 August, with a 6–1 success over Pandurii II Târgu Jiu in the fourth round of the Romanian Cup. In the 2013–14 Liga II season, CS Universitatea Craiova and FC U Craiova met in two direct matches, which hid the true identities of the clubs. CS Universitatea Craiova promoted back to Liga I in 2014 after 23 years of absence, while FC U Craiova was permanently excluded, but later reappeared under the name of FC U Craiova 1948 in 2017.

After the promotion, Universitatea ended the 2014–15 campaign in fifth place. This result was followed by eighth place in the 2015–16 season and a fourth place at the end of the 2016–17 season, the latter ensuring return to European competitions. The comeback in the third qualifying round of the UEFA Europa League was Italian side AC Milan, with Craiova leaving the competition after 0–3 on aggregate. On 27 May 2018, Universitatea won its first trophy since its reinstatement after beating second-tier club Hermannstadt in the Cupa României final. The game ended 2–0 and was hosted by the Arena Națională in Bucharest. One month later, the Romanian Football Federation approved an application to rename the society from Club Sportiv U Craiova SA to U Craiova 1948 Club Sportiv SA. As the winner of Cupa României, Craiova subsequently took part in the 2018 Supercupa României, which they lost 0–1 to CFR Cluj on home ground.

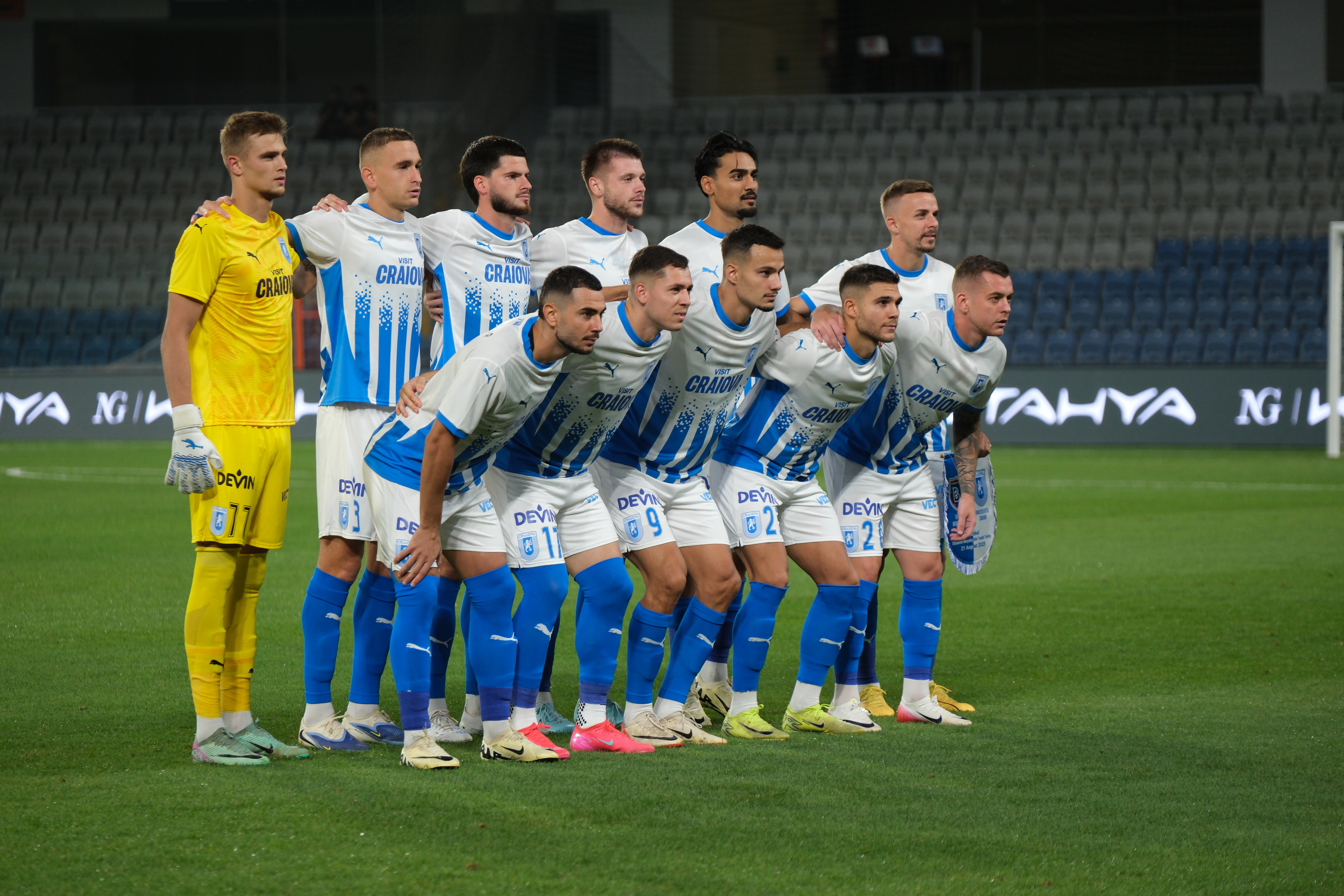
U Craiova line-up prior to the UEFA Conference League first leg play-off match against İstanbul Başakşehir, August 2025.

Two years later on 3 August 2020, in a home ground game against CFR Cluj, Universitatea Craiova came close to winning its first national league since the 1990–91 season. Dan Nistor opened the scoring for Craiova in the 11th minute, but their title contenders won the final fixture of the season 3–1, thus becoming champions for a third consecutive year. On 28 August 2025, Craiova secured its first-ever league phase qualification in European competitions, after defeating İstanbul Başakşehir 3–1 at home and 5–2 on aggregate in the Conference League play-off round.

In the 2025–26 season, the club completed a historic domestic double. They defeated Universitatea Cluj on penalties after a goalless draw in the Cupa României final, before securing their first league title since 1990–91 with a commanding 5–0 victory over the same opponent on the penultimate matchday of the Liga I season.

== Grounds ==
=== Stadionul Ion Oblemenco (1967) ===
The new Stadionul Ion Oblemenco

Stadionul Ion Oblemenco (Ion Oblemenco Stadium) was a multi-purpose stadium in Craiova, and it was originally named Central Stadium. It was used mostly for football matches and would hold up to 25,252 people before it was demolished in 2015. The stadium was opened on 29 October 1967, with the national teams of Romania and Poland tying after scoring two goals each.

It hosted many matches during the Craiova Maxima era, such as the 1981–82 European Cup quarterfinal against Bayern Munich and the 1982–83 UEFA Cup semi-final against Benfica. Following the death of Universitatea Craiova legend Ion Oblemenco in 1996, the stadium was renamed in his honour. In 2008, the stadium underwent a major renovation, and in 2015 it was entirely demolished.

==== Renovated Stadionul Ion Oblemenco ====
The new Ion Oblemenco Stadium, with a capacity of 30,929 seats, was inaugurated on 10 November 2017 with a friendly match between Universitatea Craiova and Czech club Slavia Prague.

== Support ==
Universitatea Craiova has many fans in Oltenia. They are the third-most supported team in the country after FCSB and Dinamo București, as shown in a 2016 survey. Many ultras groups exist, but in 2013, a strong division among the fans occurred due to the uncertainty regarding the true identities of the two clubs which claim the record of Universitatea. Sezione Ultra' 2000 and Utopia from Peluza Nord chose to support CS Universitatea Craiova, while Praetoria and Ultras 2004 from Peluza Sud 97 chose FC U Craiova. Later in 2017, Ultras Craiova 2004 left FC U and decided to remain neutral..

After some time, given the fact that CS Universitatea Craiova acquired most of the records, many new groups were founded: Peluza Nord Craiova: North Lions, Vechiul Spirit Ultras, Perspectiva Ultra', Nord Oltenia, Gruppo Sibiu, Gruppo Capitala, Ponsiona and UNU MAI UNIT.

In March 2018, FC U Craiova supporters attending a friendly game between Romania and Sweden at the Stadionul Ion Oblemenco booed CS U player Alexandru Mitriță upon being substituted out. They also broke chairs, and as a response, CS U fans symbolically used insecticide to "get rid of the stench" left over by Peluza Sud 97 ultras.

Supporters have fraternized with fans of SSC Napoli and Poli Timișoara.

=== Rivalries ===
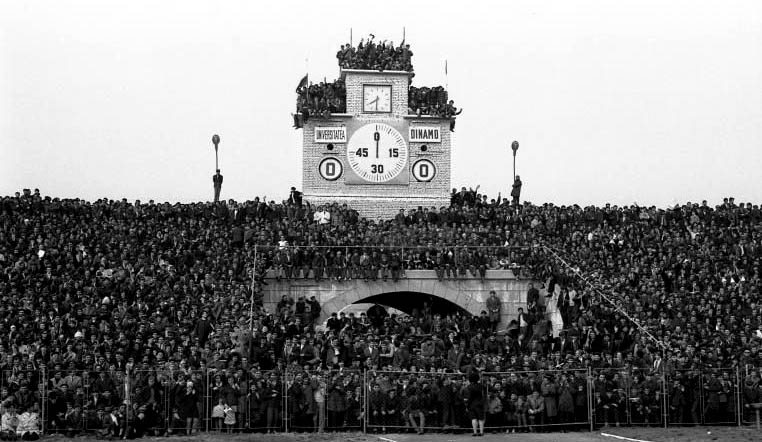
Supporters at a match between Universitatea Craiova and Dinamo București in 1973.

Universitatea Craiova maintains a long-standing rivalry with Dinamo București, originating at the end of the 1972–73 season. Both clubs finished equal on points, but Dinamo was awarded the title on a single-goal difference (+24 to +23). The outcome was highly contentious due to the postponement of Dinamo’s final match against CFR Cluj. Played a week after Craiova completed their fixtures, Dinamo needed an exact four-goal margin to secure the championship. It won the match 4–0, prompting lasting allegations from Craiova of political influence and off-pitch manipulation by the Ministry of Internal Affairs-backed club.

Știința also has less intense rivalries with three other clubs from the capital: Steaua București, FCSB, and Rapid București. Throughout time, the club had local competition with sides such as Extensiv Craiova and, from 2013, FC U Craiova, the aforementioned entity that claims the Universitatea record. The 2010s also saw the start of a minor rivalry against Pandurii Târgu Jiu, another team from Oltenia.

== Honours ==
Note: As of November 2017, LPF attributes all Universitatea Craiova trophies won between 1948 and 1991 to this entity. The ownership of these honours is disputed with FC U Craiova 1948, which acted as the continuation of Universitatea Craiova after the sports club dissolved its football section in 1991. Another court order from 2018 suggested that neither of the current clubs actually hold the original honours. On 10 July 2023, the Timișoara Court of Appeal established that the historical record achieved until the end of 1990–91 season belongs to CS U Craiova.

=== Domestic ===
- Divizia A / Liga I
  - Winners (5): 1973–74, 1979–80, 1980–81, 1990–91, 2025–26
  - Runners-up (4): 1972–73, 1981–82, 1982–83, 2019–20
- Divizia B / Liga II
  - Winners (2): 1963–64, 2013–14
  - Runners-up (1): 1960–61
- Divizia C / Liga III
  - Winners (1): 1957–58
- Cupa României
  - Winners (8): 1976–77, 1977–78, 1980–81, 1982–83, 1990–91, 2017–18, 2020–21, 2025–26
  - Runners-up (2): 1974–75, 1984–85
- Supercupa României
  - Winners (2): 2021, 2026
  - Runners-up (1): 2018

=== Europe ===
- UEFA Cup / Europa League
  - Semi-finalist: 1982–83
- European Cup / Champions League
  - Quarter-finalist: 1981–82

== European competition ==
Notable wins

Season	Match	Score
UEFA Cup / Europa League
1973–74	Universitatea Craiova – (Italy) Fiorentina	1 – 0
1979–80	Universitatea Craiova – (England) Leeds United	2 – 0
1979–80	Universitatea Craiova – (West Germany) Borussia Mönchengladbach	1 – 0
1982–83	Universitatea Craiova – (Italy) Fiorentina	3 – 1
1982–83	Universitatea Craiova – (France) Bordeaux	2 – 0
1982–83	Universitatea Craiova – (West Germany) Kaiserslautern	1 – 0
1983–84	Universitatea Craiova – (Socialist Federal Republic of Yugoslavia) Hajduk Split	1 – 0
1984–85	Universitatea Craiova – (Spain) Real Betis	1 – 0
1984–85	Universitatea Craiova – (Greece) Olympiacos	1 – 0
1986–87	Universitatea Craiova – (Turkey) Galatasaray	2 – 0
1986–87	Universitatea Craiova – (Scotland) Dundee United	1 – 0
European Cup Winners Cup
1977–78	Universitatea Craiova – (Soviet Union) Dynamo Moscow	2 – 0
1985–86	Universitatea Craiova – (France) AS Monaco	3 – 0
European Cup / Champions League
1981–82	Universitatea Craiova – (Greece) Olympiacos	3 – 0
1981–82	Universitatea Craiova – (Denmark) KB Copenhagen	4 – 1
UEFA Conference League
2022–23	Universitatea Craiova – (Ukraine) Zorya Luhansk	3 – 0
2024–25	Universitatea Craiova – (Slovenia) NK Maribor	3 – 2
2025–26	Universitatea Craiova – (Bosnia and Herzegovina) FK Sarajevo	4 – 0
2025–26	Universitatea Craiova – (Turkey) İstanbul Başakşehir	3 – 1
2025–26	Universitatea Craiova – (Austria) Rapid Wien	1 – 0

=== UEFA coefficient current ranking ===
As of 8 May 2026

Rank	Country	Team	Points
243	(Estonia)	Levadia	5.500
244	(Romania)	Universitatea Craiova	5.500
245	(North Macedonia)	Shkëndija	5.500

== Players ==
=== First team squad ===
As of 26 October 2026

Note: Flags indicate national team as defined under FIFA eligibility rules; some limited exceptions apply. Players may hold more than one non-FIFA nationality.

No.	Pos.	Nation	Player
3	DF	UKR	Oleksandr Romanchuk
4	MF	ROU	Alexandru Crețu (4th captain)
5	DF	FRA	Baptiste Roux (on loan from TSC)
6	MF	ROU	Vladimir Screciu (Vice-captain)
7	FW	FRA	Steven Nsimba
8	MF	ROU	Tudor Băluță (5th captain)
9	FW	PLE	Assad Al Hamlawi
10	FW	ROU	Ștefan Baiaram
11	DF	ROU	Nicușor Bancu (Captain)
12	FW	NGR	Monday Etim
14	MF	ROU	Alexandru Iamandache
16	MF	POR	João Lameira
17	MF	CRC	Carlos Mora

No.	Pos.	Nation	Player
19	FW	CPV	Heri Tavares
20	MF	ROU	Alexandru Cicâldău (3rd captain)
21	GK	ROU	Laurențiu Popescu
22	FW	FRA	Simon Elisor
23	MF	POR	Samuel Teles
24	DF	SRB	Nikola Stevanović
28	DF	ROU	Adrian Rus
29	MF	ROU	Luca Băsceanu
30	MF	ROU	David Matei
31	DF	JAM	Ronaldo Webster
77	GK	UKR	Pavlo Isenko
90	GK	ROU	Răzvan Sava

=== Dual registration ===
Note: Flags indicate national team as defined under FIFA eligibility rules; some limited exceptions apply. Players may hold more than one non-FIFA nationality.

No.	Pos.	Nation	Player
1	GK	ROU	Alexandru Maxim (at CSM Slatina)
18	MF	ROU	Mihnea Rădulescu (at CSM Slatina)
33	GK	ROU	Alexandru Glodean (at CSM Slatina)

No.	Pos.	Nation	Player
38	MF	ROU	Denys Muntean (at CSM Slatina)
39	MF	ROU	Sebastian Șerban (at CSM Slatina)

=== Out on loan ===
Note: Flags indicate national team as defined under FIFA eligibility rules; some limited exceptions apply. Players may hold more than one non-FIFA nationality.

No.	Pos.	Nation	Player
25	DF	ROU	Darius Fălcușan (at Concordia Chiajna until 30 June 2027)
—	DF	ROU	Florin Gașpăr (at Chindia Târgoviște until 30 June 2027)

No.	Pos.	Nation	Player
—	MF	ROU	Robert Ristoiu (at Unirea Slobozia until 30 June 2027)
—	MF	ROU	Dan Spătaru (at Politehnica Timișoara until 30 June 2027)

== Club officials ==
=== Board of directors ===
Role	Name
Owners	(Romania) Mihai Rotaru (65%) (Romania) Other shareholders (35%)
Board President	(Romania) Adrian Andrici
Executive President	(Romania) Mihai Rotaru
Honorary President	(Romania) Sorin Cârțu
General Director	(Romania) Ovidiu Costeșin
Sporting Director	(Portugal) Mário Felgueiras
Marketing & Sales Director	(Romania) Sabin Hera
Judicial Department	(Romania) Aurel Fleancu
Youth Center Manager	(Romania) Lucian Pretorian
Head of Youth Development	(Spain) Eduardo Covelo
Team Manager	(Romania) Lucian Pretorian
Ticketing Department	(Romania) Alin Chimigeru
Responsibles for Order and Safety	(Romania) Florin Cîrstea
Communications Department	(Romania) Adrian Țaina
Press Officer	(Romania) Andrei Coadă-Nicolaescu
Store Manager	(Romania) Claudia Trancă
Scouting Director	(Portugal) Hugo Pina

- Last updated: 2 August 2026

=== Current technical staff ===
Role	Name
Head coach	(Portugal) Filipe Coelho
Assistant coaches	(Austria) Markus Berger (Portugal) Tiago Zorro (Portugal) Ricardo Vasconcelos
Goalkeeping coach	(Romania) Daniel Tudor
Fitness coaches	(Romania) Cătălin Tudor (Romania) Bogdan Merișanu (Romania) Cornel Blejan
Video analysts	(Romania) Felix Muțiu (Romania) Justinian Roșu
Club Doctor	(Romania) Claudiu Stamatescu
Physiokinetotherapists	(Romania) Marius Minae (Romania) Radu Rinderu (Portugal) Thiago Joana (Romania) Valentin Rezeanu (Spain) Manuel Herrero
Masseur	(Romania) Aurel Tufan
Storemen	(Romania) Ion Dinu (Romania) Florian Vlad (Romania) Costică Purcaru (Romania) Marian Grigore

- Last updated: 2 August 2026

== League history ==
1989–present

Season	Tier	League	Place	Cupa României
2026–27	1	Liga I	TBD	TBD
2025–26	1	Liga I	1st (C)	Winners
2024–25	1	Liga I	3rd	Quarter-finals
2023–24	1	Liga I	3rd	Quarter-finals
2022–23	1	Liga I	4th	Group stage
2021–22	1	Liga I	3rd	Semi-finals
2020–21	1	Liga I	3rd	Winners
2019–20	1	Liga I	2nd	Quarter-finals

Season	Tier	League	Place	Cupa României
2018–19	1	Liga I	4th	Semi-finals
2017–18	1	Liga I	3rd	Winners
2016–17	1	Liga I	5th	Semi-finals
2015–16	1	Liga I	8th	Round of 32
2014–15	1	Liga I	5th	Quarter-finals
2013–14	2	Liga II (Seria II)	1st (C, P)	Fourth round
1990–91	1	Divizia A	1st (C)	Winners
1989–90	1	Divizia A	3rd	Semi-finals

== Notable former players ==
The footballers enlisted below have had international cap(s) for their respective countries at junior and/or senior level and significant appearances for CS Universitatea Craiova.

Romania

- (Romania) Sebastian Achim
- (Romania) Pavel Badea
- (Romania) Ilie Balaci
- (Romania) Dragu Bădin
- (Romania) Iulian Bălan
- (Romania) Mihai Bălașa
- (Romania) Alexandru Băluță
- (Romania) Cristian Bălgrădean
- (Romania) Cristian Bărbuț
- (Romania) Marian Bâcu
- (Romania) Aurel Beldeanu
- (Romania) Cornel Berneanu
- (Romania) Ovidiu Bic
- (Romania) Sandu Boc
- (Romania) Marius Briceag
- (Romania) Marian Calafeteanu
- (Romania) Rodion Cămătaru
- (Romania) Mihai Căpățînă
- (Romania) Sorin Cârțu
- (Romania) Grigore Ciupitu
- (Romania) Gheorghe Ciurea
- (Romania) Alexandru Cîmpanu
- (Romania) Marius Constantin
- (Romania) Gheorghe Craioveanu
- (Romania) Zoltan Crișan
- (Romania) Costin Curelea
- (Romania) Petre Deselnicu
- (Romania) Costică Donose
- (Romania) Andrei Dumitraș
- (Romania) Viorel Ferfelea
- (Romania) Florin Gardoș
- (Romania) Valerică Găman
- (Romania) Ion Geolgău
- (Romania) Andrei Hergheligiu
- (Romania) Mircea Irimescu
- (Romania) Andrei Ivan
- (Romania) Nicolae Ivan
- (Romania) Silviu Lung
- (Romania) Silviu Lung Jr.
- (Romania) Dumitru Marcu
- (Romania) Marcel Marin
- (Romania) Jovan Marković
- (Romania) Florea Martinovici
- (Romania) Alexandru Mateiu
- (Romania) Vasile Mănăilă
- (Romania) Simon Măzărache
- (Romania) Valentin Mihăilă
- (Romania) Alexandru Mitriță
- (Romania) Vasile Mogoș
- (Romania) Eugen Neagoe
- (Romania) Nicolae Negrilă
- (Romania) Victor Niculescu
- (Romania) Dan Nistor
- (Romania) Ion Niță
- (Romania) Ion Oblemenco
- (Romania) Ion Olaru
- (Romania) Florin Oprea
- (Romania) Paul Papp
- (Romania) Adrian Pigulea
- (Romania) Mihăiță Pleșan
- (Romania) Adrian Popescu
- (Romania) Gheorghe Popescu
- (Romania) Florin Prunea
- (Romania) Petre Purima
- (Romania) Ștefan Sameș
- (Romania) Emil Săndoi
- (Romania) Costică Ștefănescu
- (Romania) Ovidiu Stîngă
- (Romania) Ștefan Stoica
- (Romania) Lucian Strâmbeanu
- (Romania) Nicolae Tilihoi
- (Romania) Teodor Țarălungă
- (Romania) Aurel Țicleanu
- (Romania) Nicolae Ungureanu
- (Romania) Dacian Varga
- (Romania) Bogdan Vătăjelu
- (Romania) Ion Velea
- (Romania) Ștefan Vlădoiu
- (Romania) Nicolae Zamfir

Argentina

- (Argentina) Pablo Brandán

Bosnia and Herzegovina

- (Bosnia and Herzegovina) Elvir Koljić
- (Bosnia and Herzegovina) Jovo Lukić

Brazil

- (Brazil) Gustavo Vagenin
- (Brazil) Madson
- (Brazil) Raúl Silva
- (Brazil) Rivaldinho

Bulgaria

- (Bulgaria) Radoslav Dimitrov
- (Bulgaria) Valentin Iliev
- (Bulgaria) Apostol Popov
- (Bulgaria) Hristo Zlatinski

Cape Verde

- (Cape Verde) Kay
- (Cape Verde) Nuno Rocha

Côte d'Ivoire

- (Ivory Coast) Stephane Acka

Croatia

- (Croatia) Juraj Badelj
- (Croatia) Renato Kelić
- (Croatia) Ante Roguljić

Equatorial Guinea

- (Equatorial Guinea) Basilio Ndong

France

- (France) Lyes Houri

Georgia

- (Georgia (country)) Anzor Mekvabishvili

Ghana

- (Ghana) Isaac Donkor

Guinea

- (Guinea) Antoine Conte

Honduras

- (Honduras) Denil Maldonado

Italy

- (Italy) Mirko Pigliacelli

Jordan

- (Jordan) Tha'er Bawab

Lithuania

- (Lithuania) Giedrius Arlauskis

Moldova

- (Moldova) Nicolae Calancea

North Macedonia

- (North Macedonia) Gjoko Zajkov

Portugal

- (Portugal) Tiago Ferreira

Slovenia

- (Slovenia) Jasmin Kurtić

Switzerland

- (Switzerland) Matteo Fedele
- (Switzerland) Ivan Martić

=== Universitatea Craiova players at final tournaments ===
==== 1984 UEFA European Football Championship ====
- Romania – Rodion Cămătaru
- Romania – Mircea Irimescu
- Romania – Silviu Lung
- Romania – Nicolae Negrilă
- Romania – Costică Ștefănescu
- Romania – Aurel Țicleanu
- Romania – Nicolae Ungureanu

==== 1990 FIFA World Cup ====
- Romania – Adrian Popescu
- Romania – Gheorghe Popescu
- Romania – Emil Săndoi

==== 2015 Africa Cup of Nations ====
- Cape Verde – Kay
- Cape Verde – Nuno Rocha

==== 2023 Africa Cup of Nations ====
- Equatorial Guinea – Basilio Ndong

==== 2024 UEFA European Football Championship ====
- Romania – Nicușor Bancu
- (Georgia (country)) Georgia – Anzor Mekvabishvili

==== 2025 CONCACAF Gold Cup ====
- Costa Rica – Carlos Mora
- Honduras – Denil Maldonado

==== 2026 CONCACAF Nations League ====
- Jamaica – Ronaldo Webster

== Former managers ==
- (Romania) Bondoc Ionescu-Crum (1956–1958)
- (Romania) Gheorghe Scăeșteanu (1958–1960)
- (Romania) Ștefan Coidum (1968–1971)
- (Romania) Constantin Cernăianu (1971–1976)
- (Romania) Constantin Teașcă (1976–1977)
- (Romania) Ilie Oană (1978)
- (Romania) Valentin Stănescu (1979–1980)
- (Romania) Ion Oblemenco (1980–1982)
- (Romania) Constantin Oțet (1982–1984)
- (Romania) Mircea Rădulescu (1984–1986)
- (Romania) Constantin Teașcă (1986)
- (Romania) Gavril Balint
- (Romania) Sorin Cârțu
- (Romania) Constantin Gâlcă
- (Romania) Gheorghe Mulțescu
- (Romania) Eugen Neagoe
- (Romania) Victor Pițurcă
- (Romania) Mirel Rădoi
- (Romania) Laurențiu Reghecampf
- (Romania) Emil Săndoi
- (Bulgaria) Ivaylo Petev
- (Greece) Marinos Ouzounidis
- (Italy) Cristiano Bergodi
- (Italy) Devis Mangia
