= 1974–75 Cupa României =

Tournament details
- Country: Romania

Final positions
- Champions: Rapid București
- Runners-up: Universitatea Craiova

The 1974–75 Cupa României was the 37th edition of Romania's most prestigious football cup competition.

The title was won by Rapid București against Universitatea Craiova.

== Format ==
The competition is an annual knockout tournament.

First round proper matches are played on the ground of the lowest ranked team, then from the second round proper the matches are played on a neutral location.

If a match is drawn after 90 minutes, the game goes in extra time, and if the scored is still tight after 120 minutes, then the winner will be established at penalty kicks.

From the first edition, the teams from Divizia A entered in competition in sixteen finals, rule which remained till today.

== Bracket ==
Round of 32
Rapid București	2
Dinamo București	1
Olimpia Giurgiu	0
Jiul Petroşani	2
Ceahlăul Piatra Neamț	2
Politehnica Iaşi	0
Viitorul Aluniş	2
Bihoreana Marghita	4
Rapid Piatra Olt	2
Steaua București	6
Sportul Studenţesc	0
Politehnica Timişoara	2
IS Câmpia Turzii	1 (4)
Steagul Roşu Braşov (p)	1 (5)
Gloria Reşiţa	0
CFR Cluj	3
Energia Oneşti	1
Universitatea Craiova	3
Constructorul Bistriţa	0
UTA Arad	2
Universitatea Cluj	5
Argeş Piteşti	1
Ştiinţa Petroşani	1
FC Galaţi	0
ASA 1962 Târgu Mureș	2
FC Constanţa	1
CS Botoşani	1
Chimia Găeşti	0
FCM Reșița	1
Chimia Râmnicu Vâlcea	0
Progresul Brăila	1
Olimpia Satu Mare	0

Round of 16
Rapid București	1
Jiul Petroşani	0
Ceahlăul Piatra Neamț	2
Bihoreana Marghita	1
Steaua București (p)	0 (5)
Politehnica Timişoara	0 (4)
Steagul Roşu Braşov	2
CFR Cluj	0
Universitatea Craiova	1
UTA Arad	0
Universitatea Cluj	1
Ştiinţa Petroşani	0
ASA 1962 Târgu Mureș	3
CS Botoşani	1
FCM Reșița	5
Progresul Brăila	3

Quarter-finals
Rapid București	1
Ceahlăul Piatra Neamț	0
Steaua București	5
Steagul Roşu Braşov	4
Universitatea Craiova	5
Universitatea Cluj	1
ASA 1962 Târgu Mureș	1
FCM Reșița	0

Semi-finals
Rapid București (p)	1 (6)
Steaua București	1 (5)
Universitatea Craiova (p)	1 (4)
ASA 1962 Târgu Mureș	1 (2)

Final
Rapid București	2
Universitatea Craiova	1

== First round proper ==
Team 1	Score	Team 2
13 November 1974
Viitorul Aluniş (Div. D)	2–4	(Div. C) Bihoreana Marghita
Constructorul Bistriţa (Div. D)	0–2	(Div. A) UTA Arad
CS Botoşani (Div. C)	1–0	(Div. C) Chimia Găeşti
Progresul Brăila (Div. B)	1–0	(Div. A) Olimpia Satu Mare
Rapid București (Div. B)	2–1	(Div. A) Dinamo București
Sportul Studenţesc București (Div. A)	0–2	(Div. A) Politehnica Timişoara
IS Câmpia Turzii (Div. B)	1–1 (a.e.t.) (4–5 p)	(Div. A) Steagul Roşu Braşov
Universitatea Cluj (Div. A)	5–1	(Div. A) Argeş Piteşti
Energia Oneşti (Div. C)	1–3	(Div. A) Universitatea Craiova
Olimpia Giurgiu (Div. C)	0–2	(Div. A) Jiul Petroşani
Ştiinţa Petroşani (Div. C)	1–0	(Div. A) FC Galaţi
Ceahlăul Piatra Neamț (Div. B)	2–0	(Div. A) Politehnica Iaşi
Rapid Piatra Olt (Div. D)	2–6	(Div. A) Steaua București
FCM Reșița (Div. A)	1–0	(Div. A) Chimia Râmnicu Vâlcea
Gloria Reşiţa (Div. D)	0–3	(Div. A) CFR Cluj
ASA 1962 Târgu Mureș (Div. A)	2–1 (a.e.t.)	(Div. A) FC Constanţa

== Second round proper ==
Team 1	Score	Team 2
27 November 1974
Rapid București	1–0	Jiul Petroşani
FCM Reșița	5–3	Progresul Brăila
Steaua București	0–0 (a.e.t.) (5–4 p)	Politehnica Timişoara
Steagul Roşu Braşov	2–0	CFR Cluj
Ceahlăul Piatra Neamț	2–1 (a.e.t.)	Bihoreana Marghita
Universitatea Cluj	1–0	Ştiinţa Petroşani
ASA 1962 Târgu Mureș	3–1	CS Botoşani
Universitatea Craiova	1–0	UTA Arad

== Quarter-finals ==
Team 1	Score	Team 2
11 December 1974
ASA 1962 Târgu Mureș	1–0 (a.e.t.)	FCM Reșița
Rapid București	1–0	Ceahlăul Piatra Neamț
Steaua București	5–4 (a.e.t.)	Steagul Roşu Braşov
Universitatea Craiova	5–1	Universitatea Cluj

== Semi-finals ==
Team 1	Score	Team 2
25 June 1975
Rapid București	1–1 (a.e.t.) (6–5 p)	Steaua București
Universitatea Craiova	1–1 (a.e.t.) (4–2 p)	ASA 1962 Târgu Mureș

== Final ==
12 July 1975
20:00 EET

Rapid București	2–1 (a.e.t.)	Universitatea Craiova
Manea 70', 100'	Report	Oblemenco 54'

23 August, Bucharest
Attendance: 30,000
Referee: Nicolae Rainea (Bârlad)

Cupa României 1974–75 winners

9th title
