= Constantin Cernăianu =

Romanian footballer and coach (1933–2015)

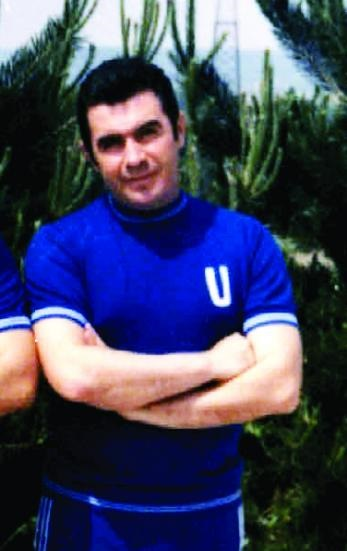
- Cernăianu as coach of Universitatea Craiova

Personal information
- Date of birth: 12 October 1933
- Place of birth: Târgu Jiu, Romania
- Date of death: 22 June 2015 (aged 81)
- Position: Midfielder

Senior career*
Years	Team	Apps	(Gls)
1949–1953	Flacăra Târgu Jiu		
1954–1955	Știința București		
1955–1960	Pandurii Târgu Jiu		

Managerial career
- 1960–1964: Petrolul Ploiești (assistant)
- 1965–1967: Petrolul Ploiești
- 1968–1969: Petrolul Ploiești (assistant)
- 1969–1971: Petrolul Ploiești
- 1971–1976: Universitatea Craiova
- 1976–1978: Romania (assistant)
- 1979–1980: Romania
- 1979–1981: Romania U20
- 1980: Sportul Studențesc București
- 1981–1983: Steaua București
- 1983–1985: Olympiakos Nicosia
- 1985: Dinamo București
- 1986–1987: Rapid București
- 1987–1988: Gloria Bistrița
- 1988–1992: Olympiakos Nicosia
- * Club domestic league appearances and goals

Constantin Cernăianu (12 October 1933 – 22 June 2015) was a Romanian football player and coach. As a head coach, Cernăianu secured two league titles with clubs outside Bucharest, Petrolul Ploiești and Universitatea Craiova.

== Playing career ==
Cernăianu was born on 12 October 1933 in Târgu Jiu, Romania and began playing football in 1949 at local club Flacăra. In 1954 he went for one year at Știința București, then he returned to Târgu Jiu at Pandurii where he played until 1960 when he retired.

== Managerial career ==
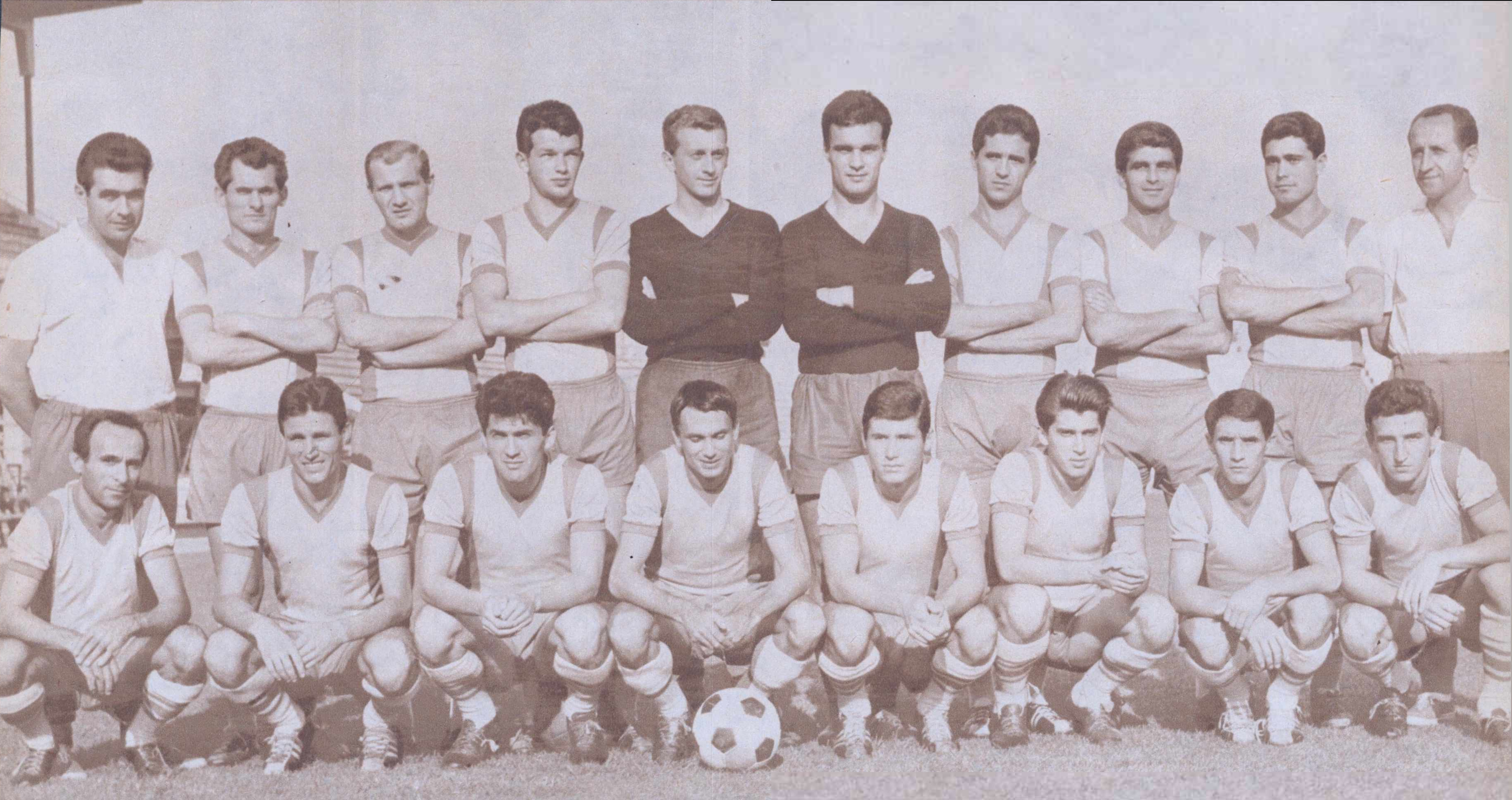
Cernăianu (back row, first from the left) as head coach of Petrolul in 1965

Cernăianu became a football coach shortly after he retired from playing in 1960, becoming Ilie Oană's assistant at Petrolul Ploiești winning together the 1962–63 Cupa României. Cernăianu became the team's head coach in 1965, helping it win the 1965–66 Divizia A championship, thus at age 32 becoming one of the youngest coaches who ever won the title. In the middle of that season he went for a month to study the training sessions of Helenio Herrera's Inter Milan. He then participated with The Yellow Wolves in the first round of the 1966–67 European Cup against Liverpool, earning a 3–1 victory which was not enough to qualify to the next round. In 1968, Ilie Oană came back to Petrolul, Cernăianu being his assistant again until 1969 when Oană left the club to coach Panserraikos in Greece. From 1969 until 1971, Cernăianu was the team's head coach but then Oană came back again and Cernăianu did not accept to be his assistant anymore, leaving the club.

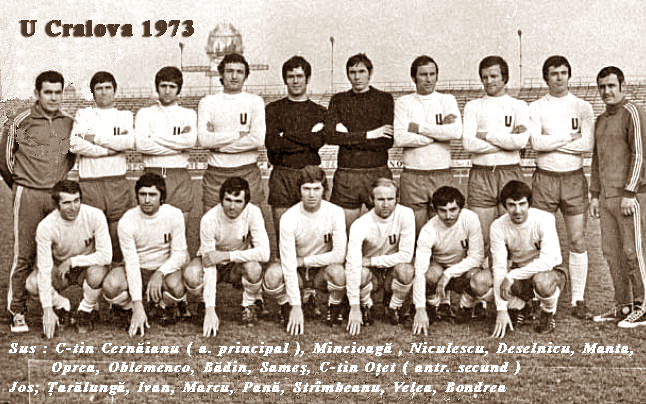
Cernăianu (back row, first from the left) as head coach of U Craiova in 1973

He went to be head coach at Universitatea Craiova, being close to winning the title in the 1972–73 season, but "U" finished in second place on equal points with Dinamo București, losing controversially on goal difference. This outcome led poet Adrian Păunescu to nickname Craiova as "Campioana unei mari iubiri" (The Champion of a great love). In the first round of the 1973–74 UEFA Cup season, "U" Craiova defeated Fiorentina with a 1–0 aggregate win, being eliminated in the following one by Standard Liège. In the same season he helped Craiova win the league title, which was the first trophy in the club's history. The following season, "U" suffered a 4–3 aggregate loss to Åtvidaberg in the first round of the European Cup. They also reached the 1975 Cupa României final which was eventually lost after a 2–1 defeat to Rapid București. Notably, Cernăianu is recognized as the coach who in 1973 gave 16-year-old Ilie Balaci his debut in professional football.

During the same period he coached simultaneously Romania's students football team, winning two Universiade gold medals in the 1972 edition held in Romania and the 1974 one in France.

From 1976 until 1978, he was Ștefan Kovács's assistant at Romania's national team, failing to qualify for the 1978 World Cup. In 1979, Cernăianu became head coach of The Tricolours, his first game being a friendly which was lost 3–1 to the Soviet Union. His following two games were a loss to Yugoslavia and a victory over Cyprus in the Euro 1980 qualifiers. He also led the national team in another loss to Yugoslavia in the final of the 1977–80 Balkan Cup. His last game took place on 2 April 1980, a 2–2 friendly draw against East Germany, having a total of six games, consisting of one victory, one draw and four losses. He also worked for Romania's under-20 squad, guiding it at the 1981 World Youth Championship in Australia, helping the team finish the tournament in third position, winning the bronze medal.

Afterwards, Cernăianu coached several Bucharest clubs such as Sportul Studențesc, Steaua, Dinamo and Rapid. He had his first spell abroad in 1983, coaching Olympiakos Nicosia which he helped earn promotion to the first league. Since 1987, he went to coach Gloria Bistrița for one year. Then he made a comeback at Olympiakos Nicosia, working there for four years until 1992, managing to reach the 1990–91 Cypriot Cup final which was lost with 1–0 to Omonia Nicosia.

Cernăianu has a total of 390 matches as a manager in the Romanian top-division, Divizia A, consisting of 168 victories, 93 draws and 129 losses.

== Works ==
In 1997, he wrote a book about football coaching titled Manualul antrenorului profesionist (The Professional Coach's Handbook).

== Death ==
Cernăianu died on 22 June 2015 at the age of 81.

== Honours ==
=== Manager ===
Petrolul Ploiești

- Divizia A: 1965–66

Universitatea Craiova

- Divizia A: 1973–74, runner-up 1972–73
- Cupa României runner-up: 1974–75

Olympiakos Nicosia

- Cypriot Second Division: 1983–84
- Cypriot Cup runner-up: 1990–91

Romania University

- World University Championships: 1972, 1974
