= History of Universitatea Craiova (football) =

Universitatea Craiova (Romanian pronunciation: [universiˈtate̯a kraˈjova]) was a Romanian professional football club based in Craiova, Dolj County. Between 1948 and 1991, Universitatea won four national titles and five national cups. In addition to its domestic success, its reputation as a major club in the country was established by being the first Romanian team to reach the semi-finals of a UEFA tournament, and remains the only one to have knocked out at least one club from each of five strongest countries in European football—England, France, Germany, Italy and Spain.

The team acted as a football section for the CSU Craiova sports club of which it was part of until 1991, when its berth in the league championship was taken by FC U Craiova following privatisation. Generally considered the same entity with the old club, FC U continued its tradition for the next two decades, but was reorganised several times and retroactively deemed an unofficial successor. Most notably, under the ownership of Adrian Mititelu, FC Universitatea was disaffiliated by the Romanian Football Federation in 2012, following their temporary banishment since July 2011, and consequently retired from every competition.

In 2013, the sports club refounded its football department, which asserts the history and trophies of the original Universitatea Craiova. CS Universitatea Craiova has in truth been backed up by some court orders and the Liga Profesionistă de Fotbal, but the record remains subject of legal dispute with the also reestablished FC U team and uncertainty persists. (Note: As of November 2017, LPF attributes all Universitatea Craiova trophies won between 1948 and 1991 to the CS U entity. FC U's only major trophy would be the 1992–93 Cupa României, although it is also claimed by the former. Another court order from 2018 suggested that neither of the current clubs actually hold the original honours.)

== History ==
=== 1921–1958: Early years of football in Craiova ===
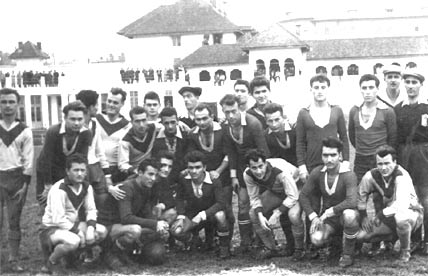
UNSR Craiova in 1948.

The football history in the city of Craiova began in 1921, when the first teams were founded: Craiovan Craiova and Rovine Grivița Craiova. In 1940, the two sides merged in what resulted to be one of the most successful Romanian clubs of the Interwar period, FC Craiova, which was also the first team of the city that won the Romanian football championship. However, the 1942–43 title is not recognized officially by FRF and LPF due to the unofficial character of the competition in that season.

Following the birth of university education in Craiova, a group of teachers and students founded CSU (Club Sportiv Universitar) Craiova in 1948, a sports club with athletics, volleyball, handball, table tennis, chess sections, and under the coordination of the Ministry of Public Education and the Uniunea Națională a Studenților din România (lit. National Union of Students in Romania), the football section was initially formed under the name UNSR Craiova and enrolled in the county championship. The first official match was held at Filiași, aganinst CFR Filiași, on 5 September 1948, with the Students being defeated 3–6. These football players dressed the white-blue shirt: Dumitrescu – Rădulescu, Mihăilă I, Carli – Ozon, Mihăilă II – Sabin, Ilie, Bădescu, Tudor, and Serghi; all under the command of head coach N. Polojinski.

In 1950, the football section changed its name from UNSR Craiova to CSU Craiova, the same name as its parent club. In 1951, CSU Craiova defeated with 6–0 Constructorul Craiova, a local rival, in what was going to be the first official match played in Cupa României. In 1953, the club was renamed Știința Craiova. The following year, under coach Nicolae Oțeleanu, the team won the Craiova Regional Championship and earned promotion to the second division for the first time in its history, after finishing first in the promotion tournament held in Arad. In Divizia B. However, their spell in the second division lasted only one season, as they finished 12th in Series I and were relegated to the newly re-established Divizia C.

=== 1958–1970: Universitatea, a rising team ===
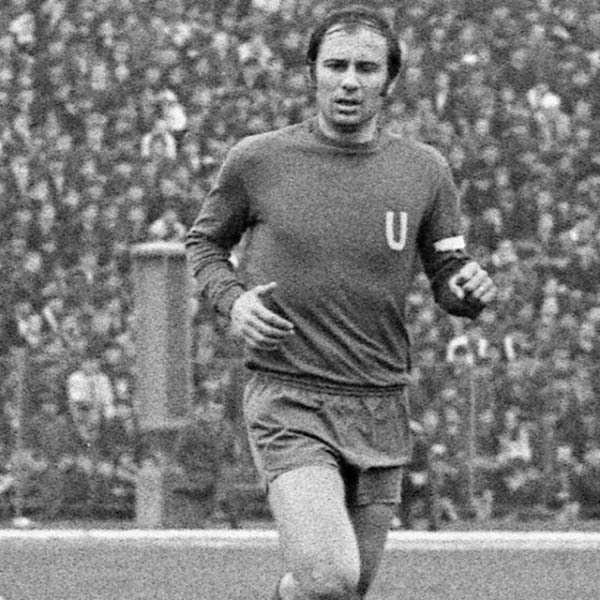
Ion Oblemenco, one of the club symbols.

Name	Period
UNSR Craiova	1948–1950
CSU Craiova	1950–1953
Știința Craiova	1953–1966
Universitatea Craiova	1966–1991
Universitatea Craiova	2013–present

In Divizia C, the Students finished 3rd in Series IV in the 1956 season, before securing a return to the second tier in 1958, when they won Series III after a tight battle for first place with Unirea Râmnicu Vâlcea, both teams tied on 34 points, with Știința clinching promotion on goal average.

In the first season after promotion, Craiova ended only on 13th place, out of 14, but progresses have been made in the next seasons: 1959–60 – 10th, 1960–61 – 2nd, but far away from the 1st place occupied by Dinamo Pitești, 1961–62 – 4th, 1962–63 – 4th. 1963–64 Divizia B season was a dramatic one, with a four-way fight for promotion in the first series of the second league. At the end the Students won the promotion, but ended at the same number of points with the 2nd place, Metalul Târgoviște, one point in front of 3rd place, Poiana Câmpina and two points over 4th place, Dinamo Bacău. This 'historical act' was 'signed' by the head coach Nicolae Oțeleanu and following players: Dumitrescu, Vasilescu, Geleriu, Lungan, Deliu, Bărbulescu, Tetea, Ganga, Anton, Lovin, Onea, Vişan, Stanciu, Papuc, C.Stesnescu, A.Stenescu.

As with the previous promotions, the first Divizia A season was a very hard one for the white and blues who saved from relegation in the last rounds, with just one point more than the first relegated team, Minerul Baia Mare. The end of the next season found Știința ranked 8th, in the middle of the standing, and they were already putting the first bases of a team able to issue claims to the title.

In the summer of 1966, the club changed its name again, this time from Știința Craiova to Universitatea Craiova, a name that will remain forever on the lips of all football lovers and team supporters from Romania. Nevertheless, supporters continued to include in their chants and their encouragements the name Știința. In the difficult moments of the games it is known that Universitatea supporters tend to chant: Hei, hei, hai Știința!

As Universitatea followed seasons of contrasting results, in some of them the team delighted the audience in others less, but has remained in the first division, regardless of the situation: 1966–67 – 3rd, 1967–68 – 11th, 1968–69 – 7th, 1969–70 – 4th. There have been 12 years of building and finishing a team that would delight the audience for the next two decades.

=== 1970–1979: "The Champion of a Great Love" ===
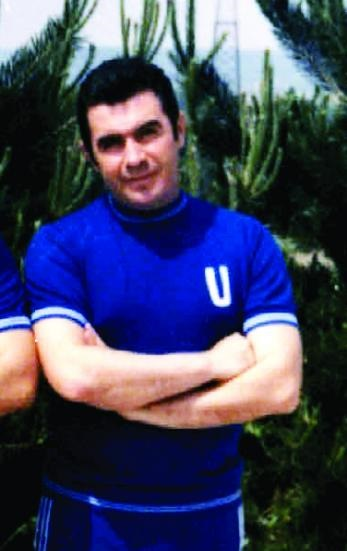
Constantin Cernăianu led the club to its first league title.

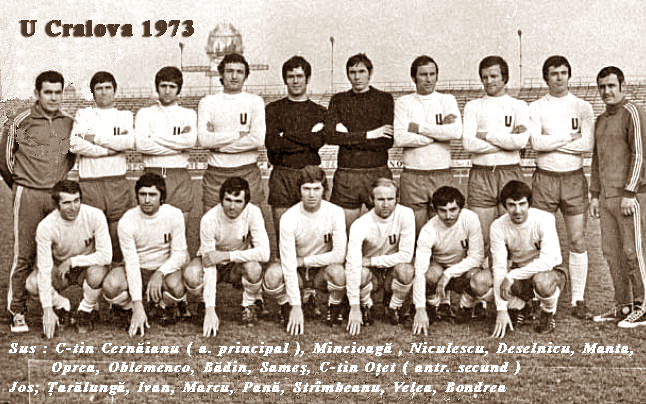
Universitatea Craiova squad (1972–73).

Craiova started the 70's with a team built around Ion Oblemenco and with players of a certain value as: Petre Deselnicu, Teodor Țarălungă, Lucian Strâmbeanu or Dumitru Marcu, among others. The start of the decade was not the most convincing, but a decent one, 6th place at the end of the 1970–71 season and 8th place at the end of the 1971–72. The first attempts of the students to shine took place in the 1972–73 season, they finished at the same number of points with Dinamo București, the title of the champion was taken by Dinamo, due to a better goal difference. This season remained in the history as the season of the birth of the nickname: "the Champion of a Great Love", a nickname created by the poet Adrian Păunescu, a big fan of the team from Bănie, he named Dinamo only as the champion of the country, indicating somewhat the suspicious circumstances, in which it was said, that Craiova lost the title.

In the 1973–74 season the title fight was again between Universitatea and Dinamo, but this time Craiova won the title with an advance of a point in front of Dinamo, being the first team of a university that won a national title in Europe. The achievement was especially impressive as Dinamo was considered to be a spoiled team of the communist regime, which often influenced the results as well and also after the last season's incidents. Universitatea was seen as a representative of the people in the struggle with the communist regime, giving the Champion of a Great Love phrase increasing power in the years following. The historical squad that won the first title was coached by Constantin Cernăianu and Constantin Oțet and had the following players included: Oprea, Manta – Niculescu, Bădin, Deselnicu, Velea, Strâmbeanu, Ivan, Niță, Balaci, Berneanu, Țarălungă, Oblemenco, Bălan, Pană, Boc, Ștefănescu, Marcu, Stăncescu, Kiss, Chivu, Negrilă and Constantinescu.

Followed a 1974–75 season that brought the first UEFA European Cup presence, a double match against Swedish team Åtvidaberg, lost 3–4 on aggregate, but a decent 3rd place at the end of the championship. 1975–76 season brought a significant fall, the team ending the season only on the 6th place and announcing a change of generation in the team. In the last season of the legendary Ion Oblemenco in the white and blue shirt of Universitatea, the expectations were no longer so high, but the team from Craiova amazed the audience again, winning for the first time in its history the Romanian Cup in a final against Steaua București, being the way of Oblemenco's generation to take good-bye from the supporters. Also in the Divizia A the team finished on 3rd place.

With the generation exchange made, Universitatea continued to impress in 1978 by defending his Romanian Cup trophy, won a year ago, this time against Olimpia Satu Mare and a 6th place in the league. 1978–79 season was ended on the 4th place and in the UEFA Cup Winners' Cup the club was eliminated in the first round by Fortuna Düsseldorf.

=== 1979–1991: Craiova Maxima ===
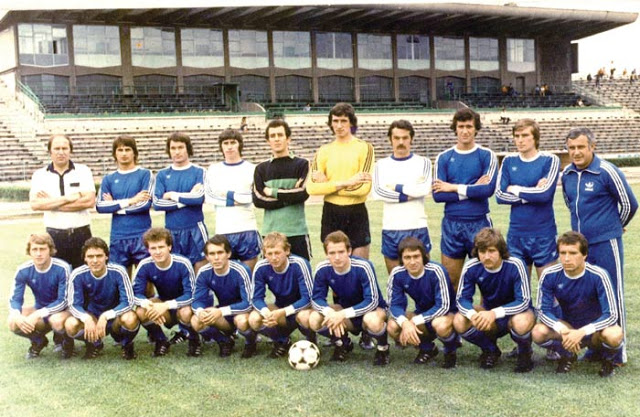
Universitatea Craiova (1980–81).

Craiova Maxima ("The Maximum Craiova") was the second golden generation of Universitatea and a team that recorded, especially in the early and mid 80's, the most notable continental performance in the history of the club. It was a squad composed by a lot of players that grew up in the proximity of the first golden team and also this team gave a large part of the 'skeleton' of the Romania national football team such as: Ilie Balaci, Rodion Cămătaru, Costică Ștefănescu, Zoltan Crișan, Ion Geolgău, Aurel Beldeanu, Costică Donose and Silviu Lung, among others.

At the end of the 1979–80 has been crowned the champion of Romania for the second time. Squad: Boldici, Lung – Negrilă, Tilihoi, Ștefănescu, Ungureanu, Balaci, Beldeanu, Crişan, Donose, Cămătaru, Geolgău, Cârțu, Irimescu, Purima and Ciupitu – coaches Valentin Stănescu and Ion Oblemenco. In this formula Universitatea made a great UEFA Cup campaign by eliminating Wiener SC and Leeds United until was hardly stopped in the third round by German side Borussia Mönchengladbach, 1–2 on aggregate.

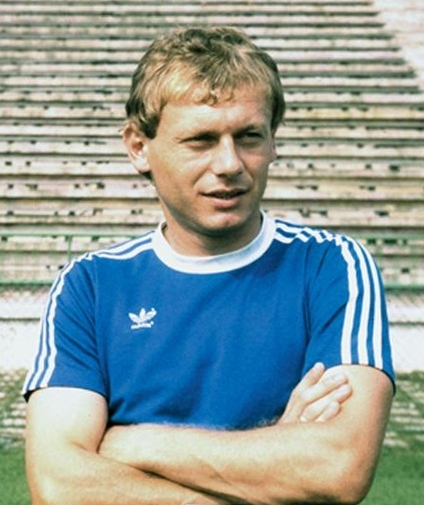
Ilie Balaci, a member of both Universitatea golden teams and named Romanian Footballer of the Year in 1981 and 1982.

The team had a historic 1980–81 season, managing the historical double, the cup and the championship. As a result of this performance, the students qualified for the 1981–82 European Cup where Craiova Maxima became more and more visible by eliminating Olympiacos and KB, being eliminated in the quarter-finals by Bayern Munich, 1–3 in aggregate, an historical performance for the Romanian football at that time.

The long-standing presence in the European Cups affected the team, which finished only on 2nd place, but qualifying in the UEFA Cup and writing history throughout the 1982–83 season, being the first team in the history of Romania that qualified in a European Cup semi-finals. Under the management of Constantin Oțet and Nicolae Ivan the white and blues took out important names in European football, such as Fiorentina (Serie A runners-up), Bordeaux and Kaiserslautern. In the semi-final, Universitatea encountered Benfica, two times European champions and three times European Cup finalists at that time. After two draws, the Portuguese side advanced to the final on aggregate away goals. In the Divizia A, the team finished again on the 2nd place.

The following years have found Universitatea Craiova as a constant presence in the first part of the standing: 1983–84 – 3rd, 1984–85 – 4th, 1985–86 – 3rd, 1986–87 – 5th, 1987–88 – 5th, 1988–89 – 5th and 1988–89 – 3rd. Also the team had a constant presence in the European Cups eliminating remarkable teams such as: Real Betis, Olympiacos, AS Monaco or Galatasaray, but they never qualified far than the third round again. The Students also lost a Romanian Cup final in 1985, 1–2 against Steaua București.

In 1991, CS Universitatea Craiova touched again the peak of the Romanian football, when the event is being held again. Prunea, Mănăilă, Săndoi, Ad. Popescu, Mogoşanu, Ciurea, Olaru, Cristescu, Zamfir, Badea, Pigulea, Agalliu, Craioveanu and Neagoe were the last players that have kissed the championship trophy. Along with coaches Sorin Cârţu and Ștefan Cioacă.

=== 1991–2011: Ups and downs ===
In 1991, Universitatea Craiova conquered its last national title and Romanian Cup, under the management of Sorin Cârțu. However, in the same year, the CS Universitatea Craiova sports club dissolved its football section and Fotbal Club Universitatea Craiova continued its tradition until the early 2010s (until 1994, the club was still controlled by the Ministry of National Education). After disappointing results in the 1991–92 European Cup and 1992–93 UEFA Cup campaigns FC Universitatea Craiova saw domestic glory by winning the 1992–93 Cupa României and finishing on the podium the same year. After that they will go on the 1993–94 European Cup Winners' Cup campaign where they will be eliminated by French side Paris Saint-Germain.The next seasons Craiova will finish second in the league in 1993–94 and 1994–95 respectively and will lose two cup finals in 1993–94 and 1997–98, also participating in 1994–95 UEFA Cup and 1995–96 Intertoto Cup.

Universitatea Craiova started the 2000s playing a Cup final in 2000 and with participations in the 2000–01 UEFA Cup and 2001 Intertoto Cup. The next 5 seasons saw Craiova finishing between 4th and 8th places but relegating in 2005. The team will go back up after one season in Divizia B. The next three seasons saw Craiova between the 9th and 7th places. During these years in the 2008–09 Liga 1 with Nicolò Napoli as manager and players like Costea brothers (Florin Costea and Mihai Costea), Andrei Prepeliță or Julius Wobay, Craiova had a decent run winning against rivals Dinamo and defending champions CFR Cluj and almost qualifying for the 2009–10 UEFA Europa League. The next year Craiova relegated again and legal problems started to appear.

On 20 July 2011, the club was temporarily excluded by the Romanian Football Federation for failing to withdraw their dispute with former coach Victor Piţurcă from a civil court, as per article 57 of the FRF statute which states that the Football Federation solves all the sports lawsuits. However, the article allows disputes regarding employment contracts to be adjudicated in civil court. The exclusion decision was approved by the FRF General Assembly on 14 May 2012. All of the squad players were declared free agents and signed with other clubs.

=== 2013–present: Rebirth ===
==== FC U Craiova ====
However, I think that FC U Craiova is the real team (Universitea Craiova), the one patronized by Adrian Mititelu.

— Ilie Blaci, The symbol of Craiova Maxima era, on 14 October 2013

In the meantime, in the summer of 2013, both FC Universitatea and CS Universitatea officially rejoined the Liga II competition, Series II. The first match of this team was the victory against SCM Argeşul Piteşti in the fourth round of the Romanian Cup, qualifying to the fifth round of the competition. FC Universitatea and CS Universitatea competed in the same league and met in two games that year, both ended 0–0. With a more stable and sustainable financing, CS Universitatea promoted to Liga I that year, while FC Universitatea withdrew from the competition. The company operating the team went bankrupt, so FC Universitatea no longer appeared in any competition. In 2017, Adrian Mititelu created a new company and his team was allowed to participate in the top regional tier of Dolj County.The team consisted of a lot of young prospects and experienced players that played for the team in the past like Ovidiu Dănănae and Mihai Dina and Nicolò Napoli in his fifth spell as a manager. In 2021, got the promotion to Liga 1 after a draw against FK Miercurea Ciuc, and later secured the title after a win over Rapid Bucharest.

==== CS U Craiova ====
I believe that this team [CS U Craiova] is the successor of the one established in 1948, under the auspices of the Senate of the University of Craiova.

— Corneliu Andrei Stroe, club president during the Craiova Maxima era, on 26 August 2013

Consequently, in the summer of 2013, local authorities of Craiova, supported by Pavel Badea, and associated with Club Sportiv U Craiova SA, refounded the football section of CS U Craiova. CS U claimed that it owns all of the Universitatea honours, and that the sports club did not offer its records to FC U Craiova, which was considered a new club; this was confirmed in justice in June 2016 and reaffirmed by LPF in November 2017. Therefore, CS Universitatea Craiova is the rightful owner of the brand and records—excepting the 1992–93 Cupa României, claimed but not officially part of CS U's honours. At the same time, the former patron of U Craiova Adrian Mititelu re-founded another club, thus starting the division of supporters and the problem of club identity.

On 14 August 2013, CS Universitatea Craiova was provisionally affiliated to the Romanian Football Federation, following complications with licensing file. After resolving the issues, the club was introduced in Liga II, the second tier of the Romanian league system. After the promotion, Universitatea ended the 2014–15 campaign on the 5th place. A 4th place at the end of the 2016–17 season ensured return to European competitions. The comeback brought an important opponent in the third qualifying round of the UEFA Europa League, Italian side A.C. Milan, Craiova leaving the competition after 0–3 on aggregate. On 27 May 2018, Universitatea won its first trophy since being refounded after beating second-tier club Hermannstadt in the Cupa României final.
