= 1978 Cupa României final =

- Event: 1977–78 Cupa României
Universitatea Craiova	Olimpia Satu Mare
3	1
- Date: 22 June 1978
- Venue: Republicii, Bucharest
- Referee: Romeo Stâncan (Bucharest)
- Attendance: 10,000

The 1978 Cupa României final was the 40th final of Romania's most prestigious football cup competition. It was disputed between Universitatea Craiova and Olimpia Satu Mare, and was won by Universitatea Craiova after a game with 4 goals. It was the second cup for Universitatea Craiova.

== Match details ==
22 June 1978
17:00 EET

Universitatea Craiova	3–1	Olimpia Satu Mare
Cârțu 43'; Cămătaru 45'; Marcu 74'	Report	Helvei 76'

Republicii, Bucharest
Attendance: 10,000
Referee: Romeo Stâncan (Bucharest)

GK	(Romania) Gabriel Boldici (substituted off) 86'
DF	(Romania) Nicolae Ungureanu
DF	(Romania) Nicolae Tilihoi
DF	(Romania) Costică Ştefănescu
DF	(Romania) Petre Purima
MF	(Romania) Costică Donose
MF	(Romania) Ilie Balaci (substituted off) 65'
MF	(Romania) Aurel Beldeanu
FW	(Romania) Sorin Cârţu
FW	(Romania) Rodion Cămătaru
FW	(Romania) Dumitru Marcu
Substitutions:
FW	(Romania) Aurel Ţicleanu (substituted in) 65'
DF	(Romania) Silviu Lung (substituted in) 86'
Manager:
(Romania) Ilie Oană

GK	(Romania) Ștefan Fehér
DF	(Romania) Mihai Popa
DF	(Romania) Viorel Smarandache
DF	(Romania) Nicolae Marcu
DF	(Romania) Sándor Pintér
MF	(Romania) Gheorghe Sabou (substituted off) 73'
MF	(Romania) Ludovic Keiser
MF	(Romania) Iosif Bathori
FW	(Romania) Viorel Mureșan
FW	(Romania) Viorel Hațeganu
FW	(Romania) Gavril Both (substituted off) 65'
Substitutions:
MF	(Romania) Iosif Helvei (substituted in) 65'
MF	(Romania) Vasile Bocșa (substituted in) 73'
Manager:
(Romania) Gheorghe Staicu

== See also ==
- List of Cupa României finals
