= Gavril Both =

Romanian footballer

Personal information
- Date of birth: 6 September 1947
- Place of birth: Satu Mare, Romania
- Date of death: 17 April 2017 (aged 69)
- Place of death: Timișoara, Romania
- Position: Forward

Senior career*
Years	Team	Apps	(Gls)
1968–1969	Olimpia Satu Mare	42	(7)
1970–1971	Dinamo București	21	(5)
1971–1972	UTA Arad	27	(5)
1972–1981	Olimpia Satu Mare	212	(49)
Total		302	(66)

Managerial career
- Oașul Negrești-Oaș
- 1997–1998: Olimpia Satu Mare
- 1999: Olimpia Satu Mare
- Someșul Satu Mare
- * Club domestic league appearances and goals

Gavril Both (6 September 1947 – 17 April 2017) was a Romanian football forward and manager.

== Playing career ==
Both, nicknamed "Dobrin of Satu Mare", was born on 6 September 1947 in Satu Mare, Romania. He began playing senior-level football at local club Olimpia during the 1968–69 Divizia C season, helping the team earn promotion to Divizia B by the end of it.

After spending half a season in the second league, he was transferred from Olimpia to Dinamo București where on 8 March 1970 he made his Divizia A debut under coach Nicolae Dumitru in a 1–0 away loss to Jiul Petroșani. The team reached the 1970 Cupa României final where Dumitru sent him to replace Ion Haidu in the 64th minute in the 2–1 loss to Steaua București. In the following season, he helped The Red Dogs win the championship as coaches Dumitru and Traian Ionescu gave him 10 appearances in which he netted one goal. In the same season, Both made his debut in European competitions, playing in both legs of the 5–1 aggregate win over PAOK in the first round of the 1970–71 Inter-Cities Fairs Cup.

Afterwards he joined UTA Arad for the 1971–72 season, scoring five goals which helped them finish runner-up in the league. He also made a European performance with The Old Lady, playing eight games in the 1971–72 UEFA Cup campaign under coach Nicolae Dumitrescu, scoring one goal in a 4–1 victory against Austria Salzburg, reaching the quarter-finals where they were eliminated by Tottenham Hotspur who eventually won the competition.

In 1972 he returned to Olimpia in Divizia B, helping the team get promoted to the first league two years later. However, after two seasons, the team was relegated, but Both stayed with the club, helping it get promoted again one year later. In the 1977–78 season, he scored a personal record of 10 goals, and also Olimpia reached the 1978 Cupa României final where coach Gheorghe Staicu used him as a starter in the 3–1 loss against Universitatea Craiova. On 25 May 1980, he made his last Divizia A appearance in a 5–1 away loss to Politehnica Iași, as Olimpia was relegated once again. Both has a total of 178 matches with 36 goals netted in the Romanian top-league. After one more season spent with Olimpia in the second league, Both retired.

== Managerial career ==
Both's first coaching spell was at Oașul Negrești-Oaș. His greatest achievement was at Olimpia Satu Mare with whom he earned a promotion to Divizia A at the end of the 1997–98 Divizia B season. The team spent only one season in the first league, during which Both was replaced but brought back to the team before the end of it. He has also coached Someșul Satu Mare several times.

== Honours ==
=== Player ===
Olimpia Satu Mare

- Divizia C: 1968–69
- Divizia B: 1973–74, 1976–77
- Cupa României runner-up: 1977–78

Dinamo București

- Divizia A: 1970–71
- Cupa României runner-up: 1969–70

UTA Arad

- Divizia A runner-up: 1971–72

=== Manager ===
Olimpia Satu Mare

- Divizia B: 1997–98
