= UNIO High School =

- Grupul Școlar Industrial Construcții de Mașini UNIO

Location
- Strada Mihai Eminescu, Nr. 1 Satu Mare, Satu Mare County 440014; Romania
- Coordinates: 47.79125°N 22.87682°E

Information
- Funding type: Public
- Established: May 29, 1948; 77 years ago
- Founder: UNIO Company
- School number: 10
- Principal: Terezia-Maria Vajda
- Staff: 94
- Grades: 9–12
- Age range: 14–18
- Enrollment: c. 2,000
- Classes: 47
- Average class size: 25
- Language: Romanian
- Sports: boxing
- Newspaper: Echinocțiu

"UNIO" High School (Romanian: Grupul Școlar Industrial Construcții de Mașini "UNIO") is a public day high school for students aged 14 to 18, established in 1948 and located at 1 Mihai Eminescu Street, Satu Mare, Romania.

The school is named after a local company, UNIO Satu Mare, specialised in producing equipment for the mining, transport, and energy industries.

== History ==
The high school was founded on May 29, 1948, as a professional school which had to train skilled workers for the UNIO industrial company located in Satu Mare. In 1967, the school received its first classrooms and established itself as one of the best professional schools, high schools, and foreman's schools in the city.

From its founding, the school functioned in a nationalised building, built in 1916, located at the intersection between Mihai Eminescu and Alexandru Ioan Cuza streets. In 1972, the high school was expanded with another building that houses 12 machine shops and with a sports field which has two terraces that can accommodate around 100 people.

== Present ==
The school has 40 classrooms organised in laboratories and cabinets. Among these there are four informatics cabinets and 13 machine shops equipped with all the right learning materials, many of which were actually manufactured by students (especially the machine shop equipment).

The institution also has a certified driving school, with two Dacia 1410s, where students can obtain the B–class driver's license. UNIO High School has an amphitheatre of 300 seats, a medical cabinet, a library with 30,000 volumes, a gym and two sports fields.

== Alumni ==
- Mircea Bolba – footballer and coach
- Zoltan Ritli – FC Steaua București goalkeeper
- Daniel Prodan – FC Steaua București defender
- Adrian Pop – fencing champion
