= Viorel Smarandache =

Romanian footballer (1953–2018)

Personal information
- Full name: Viorel Firu Smarandache
- Date of birth: 2 July 1953
- Place of birth: Coșovenii de Sus, Romania
- Date of death: 15 December 2018 (aged 65)
- Position: Central defender

Youth career
- 1969–1970: Universitatea Craiova

Senior career*
Years	Team	Apps	(Gls)
1970–1971	Universitatea Craiova	11	(0)
1971–1976	Steaua București	110	(3)
1976–1980	Olimpia Satu Mare	98	(10)
1981–1983	Gloria Buzău	4	(0)
1984–1986	Electroputere Craiova (Note: The statistics for the 1984–85 Divizia C season are unavailable.)	27	(2)
Total		250	(15)

International career
1973–1974	Romania U21	2	(0)
1971–1976	Romania U23	8	(0)
1972	Romania	1	(0)
- * Club domestic league appearances and goals

Viorel Firu Smarandache (2 July 1953 – 15 December 2018) was a Romanian footballer who played as a defender.

== Club career ==
Smarandache was born on 2 July 1953 in Coșovenii de Sus, Romania and began playing junior-level football in 1969 at Universitatea Craiova. He made his Divizia A debut on 20 September 1970 under coach Ștefan Coidum in "U" Craiova's 1–0 home victory against Jiul Petroșani.

In 1971 he joined Steaua București where he stayed until 1976, making a partnership in the central defense with Ștefan Sameș. Smarandache took part in the 1971–72 European Cup Winners' Cup campaign, playing all six games as the team reached the quarter-finals by getting past Hibernians and Barcelona, being eliminated after 1–1 on aggregate on the away goal rule by Bayern Munich. In the 1975–76 season he helped the club win The Double, being used by coach Emerich Jenei in 15 league games.

In 1976, Smarandache went to Olimpia Satu Mare in Divizia B, helping the team gain promotion to the first league at the end of the season. In the 1977–78 season, he scored a personal record of six goals, and also Olimpia reached the 1978 Cupa României final where coach Gheorghe Staicu used him the entire match in the 3–1 loss to Universitatea Craiova. On 7 October 1979, he made his last Divizia A appearance in Olimpia's 1–0 away loss to Politehnica Timișoara, totaling 188 matches with 11 goals in the competition.

In 1981, Smarandache joined Divizia B club Gloria Buzău where he played rarely in his two-season spell. In 1984 he signed with Electroputere Craiova in Divizia C, helping the side earn promotion to the second league in his first season.

== International career ==
Between 1971 and 1976, Smarandache made several appearances for Romania's under-21 and under-23 squads.

He played one friendly game for Romania, being used the entire match by coach Gheorghe Ola in a 2–2 draw against Peru.

== Death ==
Smarandache died on 15 December 2018 at age 65.

== Honours ==
Steaua București

- Divizia A: 1975–76
- Cupa României: 1975–76

Olimpia Satu Mare

- Divizia B: 1976–77
- Cupa României runner-up: 1977–78

Electroputere Craiova

- Divizia C: 1984–85
