= Florin Fabian =

Romanian footballer (born 1974)

Personal information
- Date of birth: 23 August 1974 (age 52)
- Place of birth: Satu Mare, Romania
- Position: Forward

Team information
- Current team: Dumbrăvița (head coach)

Youth career
- –1992: Olimpia Satu Mare

Senior career*
Years	Team	Apps	(Gls)
1992–1997	Olimpia Satu Mare		
1997–1998	Electroputere Craiova		
1998–1999	Universitatea Craiova		
1999–2000	Extensiv Craiova		
2000	Politehnica Timișoara		
2000–2001	UTA Arad		
2001–2002	Olimpia Satu Mare		
2003–2004	Diósgyőr		
2004–2006	Victoria Carei		
2007	Olimpia Satu Mare		

Managerial career
- 2004–2006: Victoria Carei (player/coach)
- 2007: Olimpia Satu Mare (player/coach)
- 2007–2008: Victoria Carei (player/coach)
- 2008–2010: FC Baia Mare
- 2010–2011: Arieșul Turda
- 2012–2021: Primavera Satu Mare (academy manager)
- 2021: Comuna Recea
- 2021–2022: Ripensia Timișoara
- 2022–2023: Olimpia Satu Mare (technical director)
- 2025–: Dumbrăvița
- * Club domestic league appearances and goals

Florin Fabian (born 23 August 1974) is a Romanian professional football manager and former player, currently in charge of Liga II club Dumbrăvița.

== Honours ==
=== Player ===
Victoria Carei

- Liga IV – Satu Mare County: 2007–08

=== Coach ===
Victoria Carei

- Liga IV – Satu Mare County: 2007–08

FC Baia Mare

- Liga III: 2008–09
