= Iosif Vigu =

Romanian former footballer

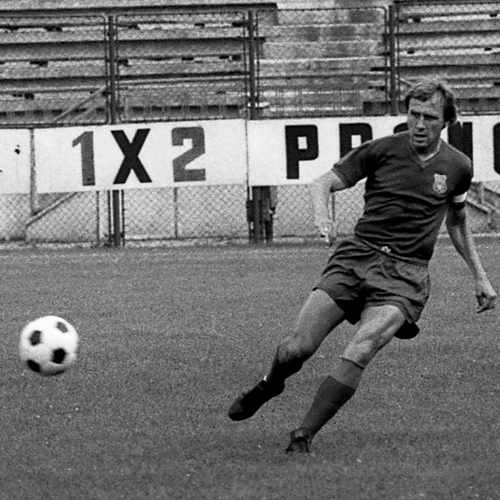

Personal information
- Date of birth: 15 May 1946 (age 80)
- Place of birth: Șimian, Bihor, Romania
- Height: 1.78 m (5 ft 10 in)
- Position: Left back

Youth career
- 1958–1963: Crișul Oradea

Senior career*
Years	Team	Apps	(Gls)
1963–1964	Flamura Roșie Oradea		
1964	Olimpia Oradea		
1965–1966	Crișul Oradea	26	(1)
1966–1980	Steaua București	313	(27)
1973–1974	→ FC Constanța (loan)	34	(3)
1980–1981	ASA Târgu Mureș	31	(3)
1981–1982	ASA Chimia Buzău		
Total		404	(34)

International career^{‡}
1971	Romania Olympic	2	(0)
1970–1979	Romania	22	(2)

Managerial career
- 1984–1986: ASA Chimia Buzău
- 1987–1992: Olimpia Satu Mare
- Minerul Turț
- Armătura Zalău
- Someșul Satu Mare
- 1994: Minerul Baia Mare
- * Club domestic league appearances and goals as of 27 December 2019 ‡ National team caps and goals as of 27 December 2019

Iosif Vigu (born 15 May 1946) is a Romanian former footballer who played as a left back. He was also a manager.

== Club career ==
Vigu was born on 15 May 1946 in Șimian, Bihor, Romania and began playing junior-level football at Crișul Oradea. In 1983, he moved to Flamura Roșie Oradea where he started his senior career in Divizia B. After a short period spent at Olimpia Oradea in Divizia C, Vigu joined Crișul Oradea and made his Divizia A debut on 4 April 1965 under coach Ladislau Zilahi in a 1–0 away loss to Minerul Baia Mare.

In 1966, Varga went to Steaua București where he stayed until 1980, but his time was interrupted in the 1973–74 season when he was loaned to FC Constanța. He won his first championship title in the 1967–68 season, being used by coach Ștefan Kovács in four games in which he scored two goals. Subsequently, he won two more in the 1975–76 and 1977–78 seasons, with coach Emerich Jenei using him in 34 matches each season, scoring three goals in the former. During his period spent with The Military Men, he also won six Cupa României, but played in only four of the finals. He played 21 games with one goal scored in European competitions. In the 1971–72 European Cup Winners' Cup campaign he played six games, as the team reached the quarter-finals by eliminating Hibernians and Barcelona, being eliminated after 1–1 on aggregate on the away goal rule by Bayern Munich. For the way he played in 1977, Vigu was placed fifth in the ranking for the Romanian Footballer of the Year award.

In the 1980–81 season, he played for ASA Târgu Mureș for which he made his last Divizia A appearance on 21 June 1981 in a 3–0 home victory against Politehnica Timișoara, totaling 404 appearances with 34 goals in the competition. He was the first player to reach 400 appearances in Divizia A, a milestone that led to the press coining the term "Iosif Vigu Club" for any footballer achieving this feat in the Romanian top-league. Vigu ended his playing career in 1982 after spending one season in Divizia C at ASA Chimia Buzău.

== International career ==
Vigu played 22 matches for Romania and scored two goals, making his debut under coach Angelo Niculescu in a Euro 1972 qualification match which ended with a 3–0 victory against Finland. He scored his first goal in a 4–0 win over Turkey in the 1977–80 Balkan Cup. Vigu played four games during the 1978 World Cup qualifiers, opening the scoring in a 6–4 loss to Yugoslavia. In the Euro 1980 qualifiers, Vigu appeared in two games, a 3–2 home victory against Yugoslavia and a 1–0 away loss to Spain. He also played two games for Romania's Olympic team without scoring.

=== International goals ===
Scores and results list Romania's goal tally first, score column indicates score after each Vigu goal.

List of international goals scored by Iosif Vigu
#	Date	Venue	Cap	Opponent	Score	Result	Competition
1	23 March 1977	Stadionul Steaua, Bucharest, Romania	3	Turkey	3–0	4–0	1977–80 Balkan Cup
2	13 November 1977	Stadionul Steaua, Bucharest, Romania	11	Yugoslavia	1–0	4–6	1978 World Cup qualifiers

== Managerial career ==
Vigu coached teams mostly from the Romanian lower leagues such as ASA Chimia Buzău, Olimpia Satu Mare, Minerul Turț, Armătura Zalău and Someșul Satu Mare. He contributed to the formation of footballers Tiberiu Csik, Zoltan Ritli, Daniel Prodan and Gábor Gerstenmájer. He had only a short spell in Divizia A when he coached Minerul Baia Mare in five games in the 1994–95 season.

== Honours ==
Steaua București

- Divizia A: 1967–68, 1975–76, 1977–78
- Cupa României: 1966–67, 1968–69, 1969–70, 1970–71, 1975–76, 1978–79

Individual

- Romanian Footballer of the Year (fifth place): 1977
