= Funicello =

Funicello is an Italian surname. Notable people with the surname include:

- Annette Funicello (1942–2013), American singer and actress
- Giuseppe Funicello (born 1987), Italian-American footballer and coach
