= Dumitru Marcu =

Romanian football player and manager (1950–2026)

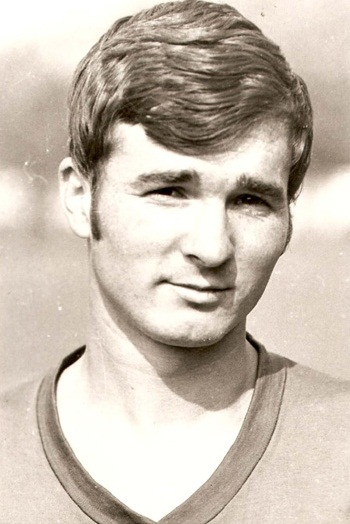
- Marcu in the early 1970s

Personal information
- Date of birth: 9 April 1950
- Place of birth: Drăghiceni, Romania
- Date of death: 13 August 2026 (aged 76)
- Place of death: Bucharest, Romania
- Position: Forward

Youth career
- 1965–1970: CFR Caracal

Senior career*
Years	Team	Apps	(Gls)
1970–1971	Steaua Bucharest	16	(4)
1972–1980	Universitatea Craiova	203	(63)
1980–1981	Mecanică Fină Bucharest		
1981–1982	Steaua Bucharest	7	(0)
1982–1984	Mecanică Fină Bucharest		(18)
1984–1987	Gloria Buzău	57	(16)
Total		283	(101)

International career
1971	Romania U23	1	(0)
1972–1975	Romania Olympic	3	(0)
1972–1979	Romania	16	(3)

Managerial career
- 1991–1993: Jiul Petroșani
- 1994–1995: Extensiv Craiova
- 1997: Jiul Petroșani
- 2000–2001: Al-Wehda
- 2002: Universitatea Craiova (caretaker)
- 2003–2004: Jiul Petroșani
- 2009: CS Vulcan
- * Club domestic league appearances and goals

Dumitru Marcu (9 April 1950 – 13 August 2026), nicknamed "Mitică" (a hypocorism) and "Motoreta" (English: "The Motorbike"), was a Romanian professional football player and manager.

Marcu spent his whole playing career in Romania, where in the 1970s he won two national titles and two national cups with Universitatea Craiova and another national cup with Steaua Bucharest. He also had two stints at lower league Mecanică Fină Bucharest, and he finished his playing career at Gloria Buzău, a club he became a sporting director at later on in his life. At the international level after having played in the under–23 and Olympic squads, he was capped 16 times by the senior national team and scored three goals, most notably two of them in Romania's biggest ever win, 9–0 against Finland in a 1974 World Cup qualifier.

After retirement he went on to manage several teams, mostly Romanian clubs.

== Club career ==
Marcu, nicknamed "Motoreta" (The Motorbike), was born on 9 April 1950 in Drăghiceni, Romania and began playing junior-level football in 1965 at CFR Caracal. In 1970, he joined Steaua București, making his Divizia A debut on 29 November when coach Ștefan Kovács sent him in the 72nd minute to replace Nicolae Pantea in a 1–1 draw against Progresul București. At the end of the season, the team won the Cupa României, but Kovács did not use him in the final. Subsequently, he played in a 2–1 win over Barcelona which helped his side advance past the Catalans during the 1971–72 European Cup Winners' Cup campaign.

In the middle of the 1971–72 season, Marcu left Steaua and joined Universitatea Craiova. There, he was close to winning the title in the 1972–73 season, but they finished in second place on equal points with Dinamo București, losing controversially on goal difference. This outcome led poet Adrian Păunescu to nickname Craiova as "Campioana unei mari iubiri" (The Champion of a great love). In the first round of the 1973–74 UEFA Cup season, "U" Craiova got past Fiorentina, being eliminated in the following one by Standard Liège, with Marcu playing all four games in the campaign. In the same season, Marcu was part of Craiova's team that won the league title, which was the club's first trophy, being used by coach Constantin Cernăianu in 24 matches in which he scored seven goals. Subsequently, Marcu also won the 1976–77 Cupa României, when he played as a starter in the final, being replaced by coach Constantin Deliu with Rodion Cămătaru in the 2–1 win over his former side Steaua. Furthermore, in the 1979–80 edition of the same competition, he was used the entire match by coach Ilie Oană in the final, scoring a goal in the 3–1 victory against Olimpia Satu Mare. During the 1979–80 season, he played only one game under coach Valentin Stănescu as "U" Craiova won another league title.

In 1980, Marcu went to play for Mecanică Fină București in Divizia B. One year later, he returned to first-league football for a second spell at Steaua. In 1982, he went back to Mecanică Fină. The team was relegated to Divizia C at the end of the 1982–83 season, but Marcu stayed with the club, helping it gain promotion back to the second league after one year. Afterwards, Marcu joined Gloria Buzău in 1984 where he scored a personal record of 12 goals in his first season. On 26 October 1986, he made his last Divizia A appearance in a 4–0 loss to Argeș Pitești, totaling 283 matches with 83 goals in the competition and 14 games with three goals in European competitions.

== International career ==
From 1971 to 1975, Marcu made several appearances for Romania's under-23 and Olympic squads.

Marcu played 16 matches and scored three goals for Romania. He made his debut on 23 April 1972 when coach Gheorghe Ola sent him on at halftime to replace Radu Jercan in a 2–2 friendly draw against Peru in which he scored the final goal. Subsequently, he made four appearances during the 1974 World Cup qualifiers, netting a brace in Romania's biggest ever victory, a 9–0 win against Finland. He also played in a 2–0 home win over Bulgaria in the 1977–80 Balkan Cup. Marcu's last appearance for the national team took place on 4 April 1979 in a 2–2 draw against Spain during the Euro 1980 qualifiers.

== Managerial career ==
Marcu began his coaching career at Jiul Petroșani in the second half of the 1990–91 Divizia A season, but the team was relegated at the end of the season. However, Marcu continued to coach Jiul until 1993. Subsequently, in 1994 he returned to first league football at Extensiv Craiova. His next spell was at Jiul for a few rounds during the 1997–98 Divizia A season. From 2000 to 2001, Marcu had his only experience coaching abroad in Saudi Arabia at Al-Wehda. In 2002, Marcu was caretaker coach at Universitatea Craiova. Afterwards, he worked for Jiul Petroșani from 2003 to 2004 and for CS Vulcan in 2009, with both spells in the Romanian lower leagues. Between 2012 and 2016, he was the sporting director of Gloria Buzău. Marcu has a total of 48 matches as a manager in the Romanian top-division, Divizia A, consisting of 13 victories, 8 draws and 27 losses.

== Personal life and death ==
In 2003, Marcu received the Honorary Citizen of Craiova title.

Marcu died at Fundeni Hospital in Bucharest, on 13 August 2026, at the age of 76.

== Career statistics ==
Scores and results list Romania's goal tally first, score column indicates score after each Marcu goal.

List of international goals scored by Dumitru Marcu
No.	Date	Venue	Opponent	Score	Result	Competition
1	23 April 1972	Stadionul Republicii, Bucharest, Romania	Peru	2–2	2–2	Friendly
2	14 October 1973	23 August Stadium, Bucharest, Romania	Finland	2–0	9–0	1974 World Cup qualifiers
3	14 October 1973	23 August Stadium, Bucharest, Romania	Finland	4–0	9–0	1974 World Cup qualifiers

== Honours ==
=== Player ===
Steaua București

- Cupa României: 1970–71

Universitatea Craiova

- Divizia A: 1973–74, 1979–80
- Cupa României: 1976–77, 1977–78

Mecanică Fină București

- Divizia C: 1983–84
