= Levente Csik =

Romanian footballer

Personal information
- Full name: Levente Zsolt Csik
- Date of birth: 29 April 1974 (age 52)
- Place of birth: Satu Mare, Romania
- Height: 1.78 m (5 ft 10 in)
- Position: Defender

Senior career*
Years	Team	Apps	(Gls)
1992–1994	Olimpia Satu Mare		
1994–1995	Brașov	11	(1)
1995–1996	Dinamo București	24	(1)
1996–1997	Brașov	28	(2)
1997–1998	Olimpia Satu Mare	30	(3)
1998–2000	Borussia Fulda	55	(8)
2000–2001	VFC Plauen	26	(0)
2001–2007	Dynamo Dresden	144	(4)
2007–2008	Borea Dresden	1	(0)
2008–2009	FC Bad Oeynhausen		
- * Club domestic league appearances and goals

Levente Zsolt Csik (born 29 April 1974) is a Romanian former professional footballer. Csik, a central or left-sided defender, played in Germany since 1998, representing Borussia Fulda, Plauen, Dynamo Dresden and Borea Dresden. He is the younger brother of former Steaua București, Olimpia Satu Mare and Minerul Lupeni player Tiberiu Csik.

He spent two seasons playing in the 2. Bundesliga for Dynamo Dresden.

== Honours ==
Olimpia Satu Mare

- Liga II: 1997–98

Dynamo Dresden

- NOFV-Oberliga: 2001–02
- Saxony Cup: 2002–03, 2006–07
