= 1973 Cupa României final =

- Event: 1972–73 Cupa României
Chimia Râmnicu Vâlcea	Constructorul Galați
3	0
- Chimia Râmnicu Vâlcea won the replay 3–0
Chimia Râmnicu Vâlcea	Constructorul Galați
1	1
- Date: 1 July 1973
- Venue: 23 August, Bucharest
- Attendance: 8,000

Replay
Chimia Râmnicu Vâlcea	Constructorul Galați
3	0
- Date: 3 July 1973
- Venue: 23 August, Bucharest
- Referee: Nicolae Petriceanu (Bucharest)
- Attendance: 8,000

The 1973 Cupa României final was the 35th final of Romania's most prestigious football cup competition. It was disputed between Chimia Râmnicu Vâlcea and Constructorul Galați, and was won by Chimia Râmnicu Vâlcea (the only time they won the tournament) after a replay.

Both teams played in 4–2–4 formation.

The 1973 match was the third final in the history of the Romanian Cup when the winner was established after a replay; the others were in 1934 and 1940.

This occasion is historic because it was the first, and so far only, final with no club from Divizia A taking part. The match is also known as "Finala desculților" (English: "The final of the poor") because the team from Râmnicu Vâlcea was playing in Divizia B and the team from Galați was playing in Divizia C at the time.

Chimia Râmnicu Vâlcea became the third club representing Divizia B to win the Romanian Cup, after Metalul Reșița in 1954 and Arieșul Turda in 1961.

Constructorul Galați became the second club representing Divizia C that reached the final, after Foresta Fălticeni in 1967. They become the champions of 1972–73 Divizia C at the end of the season.

== Match details ==
1 July 1973
17:30 EET

Chimia Râmnicu Vâlcea	1–1 (a.e.t.)	Constructorul Galați
Şutru 39'	Report	Cernega 65'

23 August, Bucharest
Attendance: 8,000
Referee: Aurel Bentu (Bucharest)

GK	1	(Romania) Ştefan Stana
DF	2	(Romania) Gheorghe Burlacu
DF	3	(Romania) Teodor Ciobanu
DF	4	(Romania) Constantin Pintilie
DF	5	(Romania) Nicolae Petrică
MF	6	(Romania) Ion Haidu
MF	7	(Romania) Ion Ionescu
FW	8	(Romania) Filip Şutru (substituted off) 73'
FW	9	(Romania) Costică Donose
FW	10	(Romania) Gheorghe Gojgaru
FW	11	(Romania) Vasile Iordache
Substitutions:
FW	12	(Romania) Iulian Orovitz (substituted on) 73'
Manager:
(Romania) Dumitru Anescu

GK	1	(Romania) Şerbănoiu
DF	2	(Romania) Petre Botea
DF	3	(Romania) Olteanu
DF	4	(Romania) Podeţ
DF	5	(Romania) Petrea
MF	6	(Romania) Constantin Ploieşteanu
MF	7	(Romania) Cernega
FW	8	(Romania) Ghica (substituted off) 77'
FW	9	(Romania) Vochin
FW	10	(Romania) Ion Ioniţă
FW	11	(Romania) Manta
Substitutions:
FW	12	(Romania) Stoleru (substituted on) 77' (substituted off) 104'
FW	13	(Romania) Cristescu (substituted on) 104'
Manager:
(Romania) Vasile Luban

== Replay ==
3 July 1973
17:30 EET

Chimia Râmnicu Vâlcea	3–0	Constructorul Galați
Iordache 8'; Gojgaru 54', 86'	Report

23 August, Bucharest
Attendance: 8,000
Referee: Nicolae Petriceanu (Bucharest)

GK	1	(Romania) Ştefan Stana
DF	2	(Romania) Gheorghe Burlacu
DF	3	(Romania) Teodor Ciobanu
DF	4	(Romania) Constantin Pintilie
DF	5	(Romania) Nicolae Petrică
MF	6	(Romania) Ion Haidu
MF	7	(Romania) Ion Ionescu
FW	8	(Romania) Filip Şutru
FW	9	(Romania) Costică Donose
FW	10	(Romania) Gheorghe Gojgaru (substituted off) 88'
FW	11	(Romania) Vasile Iordache (substituted off) 79'
Substitutions:
FW	12	(Romania) Iulian Orovitz (substituted on) 79'
FW	13	(Romania) Dumitru Popescu (substituted on) 88'
Manager:
(Romania) Dumitru Anescu

GK	1	(Romania) Şerbănoiu
DF	2	(Romania) Petre Botea
DF	3	(Romania) Olteanu
DF	4	(Romania) Podeţ
DF	5	(Romania) Petrea (substituted off) 58'
MF	6	(Romania) Constantin Ploieşteanu
MF	7	(Romania) Cernega
FW	8	(Romania) Ghica (substituted off) 67'
FW	9	(Romania) Vochin
FW	10	(Romania) Ion Ioniţă
FW	11	(Romania) Manta
Substitutions:
DF	12	(Romania) Adamache (substituted on) 58'
FW	13	(Romania) Stoleru (substituted on) 67'
Manager:
(Romania) Vasile Luban

== See also ==
- List of Cupa României finals
