= Stadionul Someșul =

Multi-use stadium in Satu Mare, Romania

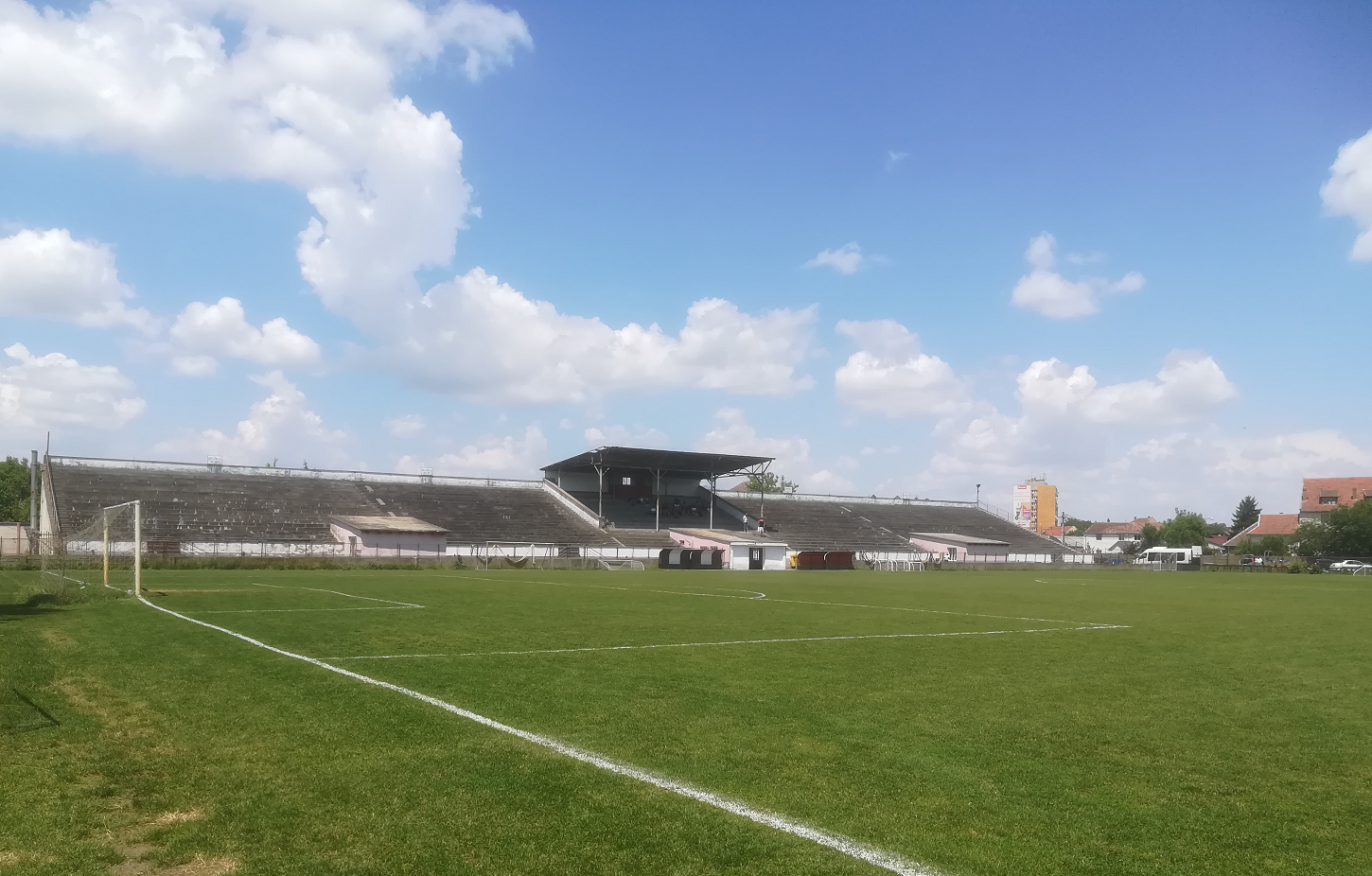
- Interactive map of Stadionul Someșul
- Address: Str. Bucovina nr. 3
- Location: Satu Mare, Romania
- Coordinates: 47°46′32″N 22°52′12.7″E
- Owner: Municipality of Satu Mare
- Operator: Olimpia Satu Mare; Someșul Satu Mare
- Capacity: 6,000
- Surface: Grass

Construction
- Opened: 1980s
- Renovated: 2000s

Tenants
- Someșul Satu Mare (1980–present); Olimpia Satu Mare (2018–present)

Stadionul Someșul is a multi-use stadium in Satu Mare, Romania. It is used mostly for football matches and is the home ground of Someșul Satu Mare and Olimpia Satu Mare. The stadium holds 6,000 people.
