= Drăghiceni =

- Commune
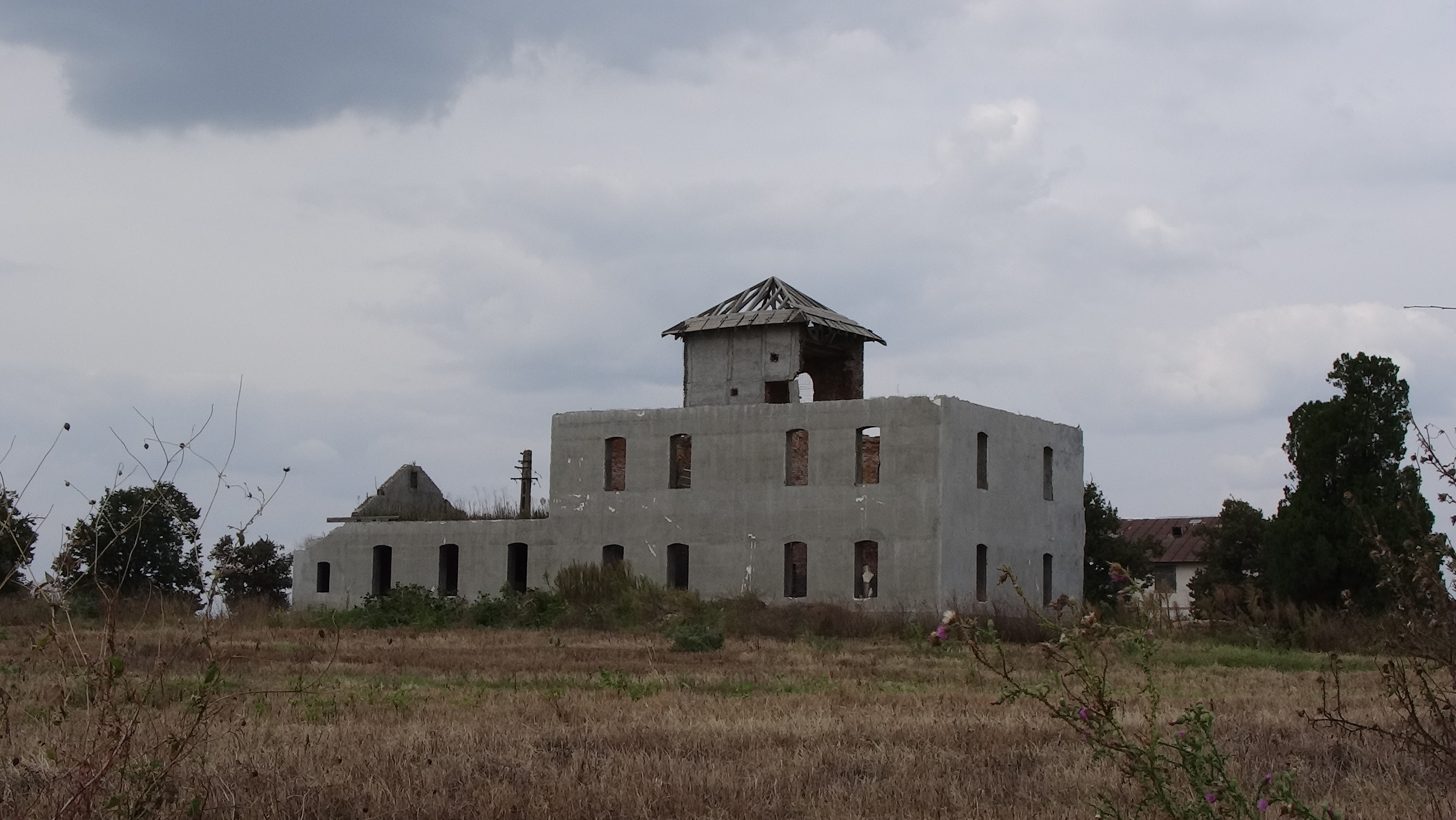
- Ruins of the Liiceni manor

- Coat of arms

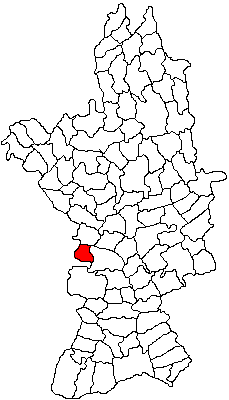
- Location in Olt County

- Location in Romania
- Coordinates: 44°8′N 24°15′E
- Country: Romania
- County: Olt

Government
  - Mayor (2024–2028): Ovidiu Florin Filip (PSD)
- Area: 30.31 km^{2} (11.70 sq mi)
- Elevation: 129 m (423 ft)
- Population (2021-12-01): 1,713
  - Density: 56.52/km^{2} (146.4/sq mi)
- Time zone: UTC+02:00 (EET)
  - Summer (DST): UTC+03:00 (EEST)
- Postal code: 237160
- Area code: +(40) 249
- Vehicle reg.: OT
- Website: primariadraghiceni.ro

Drăghiceni is a commune in Olt County, Oltenia, Romania. It is composed of three villages: Drăghiceni, Grozăvești, and Liiceni.

The commune is located in the eastern part of the county, 8 kilometres (5 mi) east of Caracal, on the border with Dolj County.

== Notable people ==
- Dumitru Marcu (1950–2026), football player and manager
