= 1983 Ballon d'Or =

Annual association football award event in France

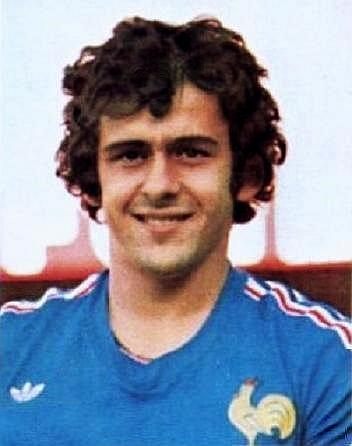
- 1983 Ballon d'Or winner, Michel Platini in 1978
- Date: 27 December 1983
- Presented by: France Football

Highlights
- Won by: (France) Michel Platini (1st award)
- Website: ballondor.com

The 1983 Ballon d'Or, given to the best football player in Europe as judged by a panel of sports journalists from UEFA member countries, was awarded to Michel Platini on 27 December 1983.

Platini was the second French national to win the award after Raymond Kopa (in 1958), and the third player from Juventus after Omar Sívori and Paolo Rossi (in 1961 and 1982, respectively).

== Rankings ==
| Rank | Name | Club(s) | Nationality | Points |
|---|---|---|---|---|
| 1 | Michel Platini | (Italy) Juventus | France | 110 |
| 2 | Kenny Dalglish | (England) Liverpool | Scotland | 26 |
| 3 | Allan Simonsen | (Denmark) Vejle | Denmark | 25 |
| 4 | Gordon Strachan | (Scotland) Aberdeen | Scotland | 24 |
| 5 | Felix Magath | (West Germany) Hamburger SV | West Germany | 20 |
| 6 | Jean-Marie Pfaff | (West Germany) Bayern Munich | Belgium | 15 |
| 6 | Rinat Dasayev | (Soviet Union) Spartak Moscow | Soviet Union | 15 |
| 8 | Karl-Heinz Rummenigge | (West Germany) Bayern Munich | West Germany | 14 |
| 8 | Jesper Olsen | (Netherlands) Ajax | Denmark | 14 |
| 10 | Bryan Robson | (England) Manchester United | England | 13 |
| 11 | Fernando Gomes | (Portugal) Porto | Portugal | 10 |
| 11 | Bernd Schuster | (Spain) Barcelona | West Germany | 10 |
| 11 | Franky Vercauteren | (Belgium) Anderlecht | Belgium | 10 |
| 11 | Alain Giresse | (France) Bordeaux | France | 10 |
| 15 | Safet Sušić | (France) Paris Saint-Germain | Yugoslavia | 8 |
| 15 | Ian Rush | (England) Liverpool | Wales | 8 |
| 17 | Morten Olsen | (Belgium) Anderlecht | Denmark | 6 |
| 18 | Norman Whiteside | (England) Manchester United | Northern Ireland | 5 |
| 19 | Bruno Conti | (Italy) Roma | Italy | 4 |
| 19 | Eric Gerets | (Italy) Milan | Belgium | 4 |
| 19 | Erwin Vandenbergh | (Belgium) Anderlecht | Belgium | 4 |
| 19 | Michael Laudrup | (Italy) Lazio | Denmark | 4 |
| 23 | Liam Brady | (Italy) Sampdoria | Republic of Ireland | 3 |
| 23 | Antonio Cabrini | (Italy) Juventus | Italy | 3 |
| 23 | Carlos Manuel | (Portugal) Benfica | Portugal | 3 |
| 23 | Vasilis Hatzipanagis | (Greece) Iraklis | Greece | 3 |
| 23 | Glenn Hysén | (Sweden) IFK Göteborg | Sweden | 3 |
| 23 | Paolo Rossi | (Italy) Juventus | Italy | 3 |
| 23 | Costică Ștefănescu | (Romania) Universitatea Craiova | Romania | 3 |
| 30 | Zbigniew Boniek | (Italy) Juventus | Poland | 2 |
| 30 | Fedor Cherenkov | (Soviet Union) Spartak Moscow | Soviet Union | 2 |
| 30 | Ruud Gullit | (Netherlands) Feyenoord | Netherlands | 2 |
| 33 | Søren Lerby | (West Germany) Bayern Munich | Denmark | 1 |
| 33 | Stoycho Mladenov | (Bulgaria) CSKA Sofia | Bulgaria | 1 |
| 33 | Tibor Nyilasi | Austria Wien | Hungary | 1 |
| 33 | Rudi Völler | (West Germany) Werder Bremen | West Germany | 1 |
