= CS Oașul Negrești-Oaș =

Romanian football club

Oașul Negrești-Oaș
- Full name: Club Sportiv Oașul 1969 Negrești-Oaș
- Nicknames: Oșenii (The People from Țara Oașului); Roș-alb-albaștrii (Red-White-Blues)
- Short name: Oașul
- Founded: 1969; 57 years ago as Energia Negrești-Oaș
- Ground: Oașul
- Capacity: 1,000
- Owner: Negrești-Oaș Town
- Chairman: Mihai Baltă
- Manager: Vasile Pop
- League: Liga IV
- 2025–26: Liga IV, Satu Mare, 3rd of 8
Home colours	Away colours

Club Sportiv Oașul 1969 Negrești-Oaș, commonly known as Oașul Negrești-Oaș or simply as Oașul 1969, is a Romanian amateur football club based in Negrești-Oaș, Romania. The club was founded in 1969, under the name of Energia Negrești-Oaș, and in the best period of its history played in the second-tier for two consecutive seasons (2003 to 2005). Oașul is currently playing in the Liga IV.

The club's players are known as oșenii, which means the inhabitants of Țara Oașului, a historical region of Romania situated between current administrative divisions of Satu Mare County and Maramureș County. The red-white-blues are the most important club of this historical region, the only one that played at the level of the second division, while the main local rival is Voința Turț (former Minerul Turț) – club which as it best reached the third tier. Other local and regional rivalries are against Olimpia Satu Mare and Minaur Baia Mare.

== History ==
Oașul Negrești-Oaș was founded in 1969 under the name of Energia Negrești-Oaș and enrolled in the Divizia D, Satu Mare Series. After three seasons spent at the level of the 4th tier, Energia promoted to Divizia C in the summer of 1973, after winning its series, but now under the name of Oașul Negrești-Oaș. For the next 18 years the team was a constant presence at the level of Divizia C, but mainly with rankings in the middle and lower parts of the league table (between 7th and 13th, out of 16 teams), never achieved one of the top three places and at its best, Oașul achieved a 4th place, twice, at the end of the 1983–84 and 1989–90 seasons. Finally, the run of the red-white-blues ended during the 1991–92 season, when the club withdrew due to financial problems.

Name	Period
Energia Negrești-Oaș	1969–1972
Oașul Negrești-Oaș	1972–2007
Energia Negrești-Oaș	2007–2022
Oașul Negrești-Oaș	2022–present

The club based in Negrești-Oaș was quickly regrouped and at the end of the 1993–94 season promoted again in the third league of the Romanian football league system, but now the story would be different and after only one season Oașul relegated again and promoted back only four years later, in 1999. The third promotion was luckier, in the first season oșenii equalizing their best result (4th place), followed two seasons in which the club from Satu Mare County barely survived at this level, but then again, Oașul found the strength for a new good season, surpassing the old record after a rank on the 3rd place and a promotion to an extended version of the Divizia B, with three series consisting of 16 teams each one. During the 2003–04 season, under the management of former Steaua București goalkeeper, Zoltan Ritli the club set new records for the football of Negrești-Oaș and Țara Oașului (1st season in the second division, best ranking – 8th place), above some teams such as Corvinul Hunedoara, CSM Reșița or FC Baia Mare. After another season, Oașul Negrești relegated back to the third division, after it was ranked 14th out of 16. However, the team's decline could not be stopped and relegated again at the end of the 2005–06 Divizia C season (12th of 13).

In 2007 the team was re-organized under its first name, Energia Negrești-Oaș, but since then the team never managed to promote again at the national level. In 2018, eleven years after its reorganization, Energia won Satu Mare Series of the Liga IV, with one point ahead Crasna Moftinu Mic, but did not make it to the promotion play-offs, due to organizational problems. In 2021 the red-white-blues started to think again about promotion and with the financial support of the local authorities and local businessmen and after a 2nd place, just behind Victoria Carei, in the summer of 2022, Energia Negrești-Oaș was renamed again as Oașul Negrești-Oaș, with the clear objective of attacking the promotion.

== Ground ==
The club plays its home matches on Oașul Stadium in Negrești-Oaș, with a capacity of 1,000 people.

== Rivalries ==
The red-white-blues are the most important football club of Țara Oașului historical region, the only one that played at the level of the second division, while the main local rival is Voința Turț (former Minerul Turț) – club which as it best reached the third-tier. Other local and regional rivalries are against Olimpia Satu Mare and Minaur Baia Mare.

== Honours ==
=== Leagues ===
Liga IV – Satu Mare County

- Winners (5): 1972–73, 1993–94, 1998–99, 2017–18, 2023-24
- Runners-up (3): 2015–16, 2021–22, 2022–23

=== Other performances ===
- 2 seasons in Liga II
  - Best finish in Liga II: 8th (2003–04)
- 24 seasons in Liga III
  - Best finish in Liga III: 3rd (2002–03)

== Club officials ==
=== Board of directors ===
Role	Name
Owner	(Romania) Negrești-Oaș Town
President	(Romania) Adrian Andreka
Executive President	(Romania) Mihai Baltă
Sporting manager	(Romania) Răzvan Lupu
Team Manager	(Romania) Adrian Bilț

=== Current technical staff ===
Role	Name
Manager	(Romania) Vasile Pop
Assistant manager	(Romania) Lucian Homorozan
Goalkeeping coach	(Romania) Daniel Pintea

== League history ==
Season	Tier	Division	Place	Notes	Cupa României

Season	Tier	Division	Place	Notes	Cupa României
2023–24	4	Liga IV (SM)	1st (C)		
