= Costică Donose =

Romanian footballer

Personal information
- Date of birth: 22 December 1952 (age 73)
- Place of birth: Tecuci, Romania
- Position: Central midfielder

Youth career
- Universitatea Craiova

Senior career*
Years	Team	Apps	(Gls)
1969–1972	Universitatea Craiova	40	(1)
1973–1975	Chimia Râmnicu Vâlcea	62	(5)
1975–1984	Universitatea Craiova	230	(26)
1984–1986	Olt Scornicești	25	(0)
1986–1987	IO Balș		
Total		357	(32)

International career
1976	Romania U23	1	(0)
1977	Romania B	1	(0)
1983	Romania Olympic	2	(0)

Managerial career
- 1991: Petrolul Stoina
- 2001–2002: CFR Craiova
- 2003–2005: Senaco Novaci
- * Club domestic league appearances and goals

Costică Donose (born 22 December 1952) is a Romanian former footballer who played as a central midfielder.

== Club career ==
Donose, nicknamed "Pelé", was born on 22 December 1952 in Tecuci, Romania and began playing football at Universitatea Craiova. He made his Divizia A debut on 7 March 1970 under coach Ștefan Coidum in a 1–1 draw against Universitatea Cluj. In the middle of the 1972–73 season, Donose went to play for Chimia Râmnicu Vâlcea in Divizia B. There, he won the Cupa României at the end of the season, being used by coach Dumitru Anescu all the minutes in both games in the final against Constructorul Galați. Subsequently, he played in both legs of the 4–2 aggregate loss to Glentoran in the 1973–74 European Cup Winners' Cup. In the same season the team earned promotion to the first league.

In 1975, Donose returned to Universitatea Craiova, where he would spend the following nine seasons, being part of the "Craiova Maxima" generation that won two consecutive league titles in 1980 and 1981. At the first one he contributed with five goals scored in the 27 appearances given to him by coach Valentin Stănescu and in the second he netted six goals in the 32 matches coach Ion Oblemenco used him. He also won the Cupa României four times, but played in only three finals, scoring once in the 6–0 victory over Politehnica Timișoara in the 1981 final.

Donose played 24 games for "U" Craiova in European competitions. In the second round of the 1979–80 UEFA Cup he played in both legs of the 4–0 aggregate win over Leeds United, as Universitatea became the first Romanian club that eliminated a team from England in European competitions. Afterwards, they reached the quarter-finals in the 1981–82 European Cup by eliminating Olympiacos and Kjøbenhavns Boldklub, being eliminated with 3–1 on aggregate by Bayern Munich. He made 10 appearances in the 1982–83 UEFA Cup campaign when they reached the semi-finals, being eliminated by Benfica on the away goal rule after 1–1 on aggregate.

In 1984, Donose joined Olt Scornicești where on 2 April 1986 he made his last Divizia A appearance in a 1–0 home loss to Dinamo București, totaling 319 matches with 27 goals in the competition. He ended his career after playing in the 1986–87 Divizia C season for IO Balș.

== International career ==
Even though Donose made several appearances between 1976 and 1983 for Romania's under-23, B and Olympic teams, he never played for Romania's senior team. On 13 May 2020, Gazeta Sporturilor included him in a first XI of best Romanian players who never played for the senior national team.

== Managerial career ==
After he ended his playing career, he worked as a manager in the Romanian lower leagues for teams such as Petrolul Stoina, CFR Craiova and Senaco Novaci.

== Personal life ==
In 2003, Donose received the Honorary Citizen of Craiova title.

== Honours ==
Chimia Râmnicu Vâlcea

- Divizia B: 1973–74
- Cupa României: 1972–73

Universitatea Craiova

- Divizia A: 1979–80, 1980–81
- Cupa României: 1976–77, 1977–78, 1980–81, 1982–83
