= Giuseppe Funicello =

Italian-American footballer

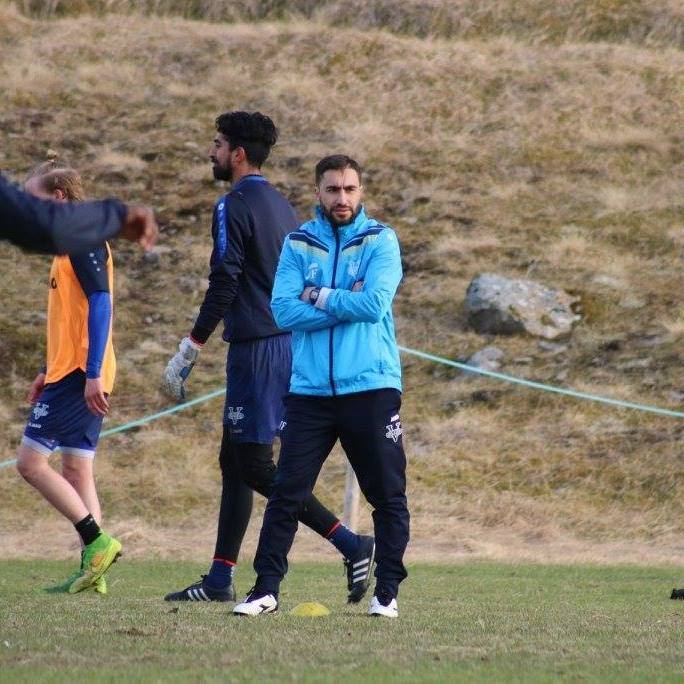
- Giuseppe Funicello coaching for IF Vestri

Personal information
- Full name: Giuseppe Pasquale Funicello
- Date of birth: 19 April 1987 (age 39)
- Place of birth: Agropoli, Italy
- Height: 5 ft 8 in (1.73 m)
- Positions: Defender; midfielder

Team information
- Current team: Olimpia Satu Mare (manager)

Youth career
- 2005: New York Red Bulls Academy
- 2006: Salernitana

Senior career*
Years	Team	Apps	(Gls)
2007	Brooklyn Knights	2	(0)
2007	Ashford Town (Middlesex)		
2008–2009	Corinthian-Casuals	22	(8)
2009	Real Maryland Monarchs	12	(0)
2010	Thor Akureyri	13	(0)
2010–2011	IFK Mariehamn	14	(0)
2011	VPS	0	(0)
2012–2013	Thor Akureyri	24	(1)
2013	FF Jaro	9	(0)

Managerial career
- 2016: Vestri men's football
- 2024–: Olimpia Satu Mare
- * Club domestic league appearances and goals as of 17:42, 21 January 2024 (UTC)

Giuseppe "Joe" Funicello (born 19 April 1987 in Agropoli) is a former Italian-American football player who is currently the manager of Romanian Liga III club FC Olimpia Satu Mare.

== Career ==
=== Youth ===
Funicello grew up in Norwalk, Connecticut, and attended Norwalk High School, where he was local newspaper The Hour's 2004 All-Area MVP. He turned down chances to play college soccer, instead travelling to Europe to pursue a professional career.

=== Professional ===
Funicello played for the youth team at Salernitana in Italy, but was not offered a full professional contract by the team, and returned to the United States to consider his options. He briefly trialled with both the New York Red Bulls in Major League Soccer and the Atlanta Silverbacks in the USL First Division, and played for the Brooklyn Knights in the USL Premier Development League, before returning to Europe again in the fall of 2007.

Funicello played a handful of games for English team Ashford Town (Middlesex), had a trial with Charlton Athletic, and played some more for Corinthian-Casuals in the Isthmian League Division One South, until being signed by the Real Maryland Monarchs in the USL Second Division in the summer of 2009.

Funicello signed with Icelandic club Thor Akureyri in April 2010, after an extended trial period. He played in 13 games for Thor, before being transferred to IFK Mariehamn.

Funicello was transferred to IFK Mariehamn on 31 August 2010.

He signed a one-year extension with IFK Mariehamn after helping them stay in the Veikkausliiga. After a disagreement with current IFK Mariehamn manager Pekka Lyyski, Funicello was transferred to VPS. Funicello expressed his and his teammates horrible relationship with Lyyski. It was the 3rd most read article in Finnish newspaper.

Funicello's time was short lived at VPS as he tore ligaments in his ankle in his first week of training with his new club. Resulting in him missing the rest of the regular season. He went on to sign with his former club Þór in Iceland helping them advance to 2nd round of the UEFA Europa League, and gain promotion back to the Pepsi Deild.

He transferred to FF Jaro on 31 August 2013.

Funicello was named head coach of Icelandic club IF Vestri in February 2016.

Funicello was temporarily an assistant coach at Liga FPD club Limón in early 2021. On the 19th of January 2024, he was named head coach of Romanian Liga III club FC Olimpia Satu Mare.

== Personal life ==
Funicello is the founder and head coach of a player development program and now third division team based in Costa Rica called SoccerViza, which mainly aims to assist players in getting identified by professional clubs and scouts, with previous program alumni including former USYNT captain Tyler Turner and Zac Lubin.
