= Mircea Bolba =

Romanian footballer and coach (1961–2021)

Personal information
- Date of birth: 30 October 1961
- Place of birth: Craidorolț, Romania
- Date of death: 6 January 2021 (aged 59)
- Place of death: Satu Mare, Romania
- Position: Midfielder

Senior career*
Years	Team	Apps	(Gls)
1977–1980	Olimpia Satu Mare	20	(4)
1980–1981	Steaua București	8	(1)
1981–1982	ASA Târgu Mureș	19	(2)
1982–1984	Olimpia Satu Mare		(11)
1984–1987	Politehnica Timișoara	74	(49)
1987–1989	Olimpia Satu Mare		(14)
1989–1990	Bihor Oradea	25	(7)
1990	Sportul 30 Decembrie		(0)
1990–1991	Evagoras Paphos		(12)
1991–1992	Armătura Zalău		(0)
1992–1993	Inter Sibiu	3	(0)
1993	Armătura Zalău		(0)
1995	Olimpia Satu Mare	9	(1)
Total		158	(101)

International career
1981	Romania U20	3	(0)

Managerial career
- 2004–2006: Olimpia Satu Mare
- 2006: Fink Fester Petrești
- 2007: Olimpia Satu Mare
- 2007: Talna Orașu Nou
- 2007–2008: Arieșul Turda
- 2008: Silvania Șimleu Silvaniei
- 2008–2009: Unirea Dej
- 2010: Talna Orașu Nou
- 2010–2011: Olimpia Satu Mare II
- 2011: FCMU Baia Mare (technical director)
- 2011–2012: Unirea Dej
- 2011–2016: Olimpia Satu Mare II
- 2016: Olimpia Satu Mare
- 2017: Olimpia Satu Mare (assistant)
- 2018: Turul Micula
- 2018: Unirea Dej
- 2018–2019: Someșul Dej
- 2020: Someșul Dej
- 2020–2021: Olimpia Satu Mare
Medal record
Representing Romania
FIFA World Youth Championship
Bronze medal – third place	FIFA U-20 World Cup	1981
- * Club domestic league appearances and goals

Mircea Bolba (31 October 1961 – 6 January 2021) was a Romanian football midfielder and manager.

== Career ==
As a footballer, Bolba played for Olimpia Satu Mare, Steaua București, ASA Târgu Mureș, Politehnica Timișoara and FC Bihor Oradea, among others. After retirement, Bolba started his career as a manager, coaching over years especially teams from Satu Mare County, such as Olimpia Satu Mare (several times), Fink Fester Petrești, Talna Orașu Nou or Turul Micula. Bolba also managed other teams, especially from the region of Transylvania, among them Arieșul Turda, Silvania Șimleu Silvaniei, Unirea Dej or Someșul Dej.

Mircea Bolba died in the morning of 6 January 2021, at the age of 59. At the moment of death, he was the manager of Olimpia MCMXXI Satu Mare, a fan-owned football club and also a phoenix club of Olimpia Satu Mare.

Bolba died from COVID-19 in 2020.
