= Costică Ștefănescu =

Romanian footballer and manager

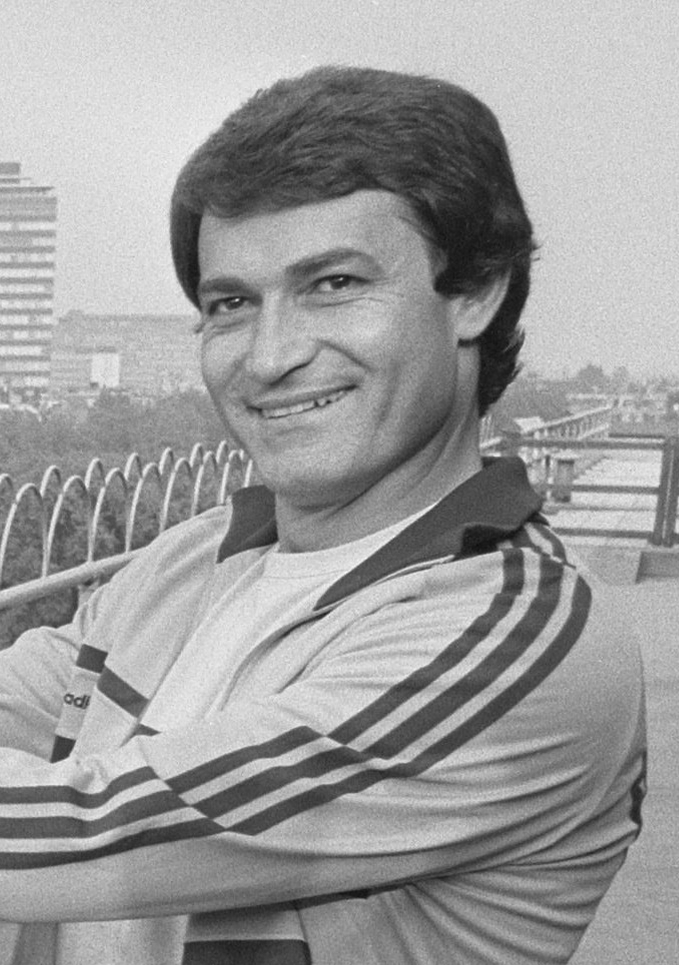
- Ștefănescu at the Amsterdam tournament in 1984

Personal information
- Date of birth: 26 March 1951
- Place of birth: Bucharest, Romania
- Date of death: 20 August 2013 (aged 62)
- Place of death: Bucharest, Romania
- Height: 1.78 m (5 ft 10 in)
- Position: Centre-back

Youth career
- 1965–1969: Steaua București

Senior career*
| Years | Team | Apps | (Gls) |
| 1969–1973 | Steaua București | 77 | (9) |
| 1973–1986 | Universitatea Craiova | 378 | (10) |
| 1986–1988 | FCM Brașov | 35 | (0) |
| Total | | 490 | (19) |

International career
| 1977–1985 | Romania | 64 | (0) |

Managerial career
- 1986–1989: FCM Brașov
- 1990: Steaua București
- 1990–1991: Romania U21
- 1991–1992: Al-Wakrah
- 1992–1993: Selena Bacău
- 1993–1994: Politehnica Timișoara
- 1994–1998: Romania (assistant)
- 1999–2000: Astra Ploiești
- 2000–2001: CSM Reșița
- 2001–2002: Hapoel Tzafririm Holon
- 2003: Al Shoala
- 2003–2005: Al-Jaish Damascus
- 2006: FC U Craiova
- 2007: Al-Wahda Damascus
- 2008: Najran SC
- 2009: Al Tadamon
- 2010–2012: Al-Jaish Damascus
- 2012: Al Shamal
- * Club domestic league appearances and goals

Costică Ștefănescu (26 March 1951 – 20 August 2013) was a Romanian professional football player and coach. He spent the majority of his playing career at Universitatea Craiova, where he made a club-record 378 appearances. He was the all-time appearance leader in Liga I with 490 matches, until his record was broken in October 2012 by Ionel Dănciulescu. In 1983, Ștefănescu was nominated for the Ballon d'Or. He played for Romania from 1977 to 1985, and was capped 64 times.

In August 2013, he died after he jumped from the fifth floor of a hospital in Bucharest, where he had been receiving treatment for cancer.

== Club career ==
=== Steaua București ===
Ștefănescu, nicknamed Ministrul Apărării ("The Minister of Defence"), was born on 26 March 1951 in Bucharest, Romania. He began playing junior-level football in 1965 at Steaua București. He made his Divizia A debut on 1 June 1969 under coach Ștefan Kovács in a 2–0 derby win over Rapid București. In that game he played as a midfielder, afterwards playing as a forward for a few years until he established himself as a defender. His first trophy won was the 1969–70 Cupa României, as Kovács kept him on as a starter for 60 minutes before Vasile Negrea replaced him in the 2–1 victory against rivals Dinamo București in the final. The team also won the following edition of the Cupa României, but this time Kovács did not play him in the final. During his period spent with The Military Men, he played eight games with one goal scored in European Cup Winners' Cup over the course of three seasons. Notably, in the 1971–72 campaign he played three games, as the team reached the quarter-finals by eliminating Hibernians and Barcelona, being eliminated after 1–1 on aggregate on the away goal rule by Bayern Munich.

=== Universitatea Craiova ===
In 1973, Ștefănescu went to play for Universitatea Craiova. His first performance there was when he played three games in the 1973–74 UEFA Cup campaign, as "U" Craiova got past Fiorentina in the first round, being eliminated in the following one by Standard Liège. In the same season, he was part of Craiova's team that won the league title, which was the club's first trophy, being used by coach Constantin Cernăianu in 20 games. From 1976 onwards, he formed a successful partnership in the central defense with Nicolae Tilihoi.

Ștefănescu spent a total of 13 seasons with "U" Craiova, being the captain of the "Craiova Maxima" generation that won two consecutive league titles in 1980 and 1981. At the first one he scored one goal in the 30 appearances given to him by coach Valentin Stănescu and in the second he netted two goals in the 31 matches coach Ion Oblemenco used him. He also won the Cupa României four times, but played in only three finals, scoring once in the 6–0 victory over Politehnica Timișoara in the 1981 final.

Ștefănescu played a total of 46 games for "U" Craiova in European competitions. In the second round of the 1979–80 UEFA Cup, he played in both legs of the 4–0 aggregate win over Leeds United, as Universitatea became the first Romanian club that eliminated a team from England in European competitions. Afterwards, they reached the quarter-finals in the 1981–82 European Cup by eliminating Olympiacos and Kjøbenhavns Boldklub, being eliminated with 3–1 on aggregate by Bayern Munich. Ștefănescu made 10 appearances in the 1982–83 UEFA Cup campaign when they reached the semi-finals, being eliminated by Benfica on the away goal rule after 1–1 on aggregate. Contributing six matches to the 1984–85 UEFA Cup run, he helped "U" navigate past Real Betis and Olympiacos before they ultimately fell to Željezničar in the round of 16. Ștefănescu played in a 3–0 win over AS Monaco in the second leg of the first round of the 1985–86 European Cup Winners' Cup, after losing the first leg 2–0. However, they were eliminated in the following round by the eventual winners of the competition, Dynamo Kyiv. From 1978 to 1985, Ștefănescu finished second four times and third four times in the Romanian Footballer of the Year ranking. In 1983, he was nominated for the Ballon d'Or.

=== FCM Brașov ===
In 1986, Ștefănescu joined FCM Brașov as a player-coach. There, he made his last Divizia A appearance on 22 June 1988 in a 4–1 loss to his former club Universitatea Craiova, totaling 490 matches with 19 goals in the competition. Those 490 games made him the player with the most appearances in the Romanian top-league until October 2012 when Ionel Dănciulescu broke his record.

== International career ==
Ștefănescu played 64 matches, captaining 44 of them, for Romania. He made his debut at age 26 on 14 August 1977 when coach Ștefan Kovács sent him in the 70th minute to replace Ștefan Sameș in a 3–1 victory against Czechoslovakia in the Coupe Mohamed V final. Subsequently, he played four matches in the successful 1977–80 Balkan Cup, including both legs of the 4–3 aggregate win against Yugoslavia in the final. He also played five games during the Euro 1980 qualifiers. Then he captained the team throughout all the eight games in the 1982 World Cup qualifiers which included a 2–1 home win and a 0–0 away draw against England. He played seven games in the successful Euro 1984 qualifiers, including two 1–0 wins over World Cup holders Italy, and Sweden, with Ștefănescu providing the assist for Rodion Cămătaru's goal in the victory against the Swedes. Coach Mircea Lucescu used him for the entirety of all three games in the final tournament which were a draw against Spain and losses to West Germany and Portugal, as his side failed to progress from their group. Subsequently, he played seven games during the 1986 World Cup qualifiers, including his last appearance for the national team which took place on 13 November 1985 in a 3–1 away win over Turkey.

For representing his country at the Euro 1984 final tournament, Ștefănescu was decorated by President of Romania Traian Băsescu on 25 March 2008 with the Ordinul "Meritul Sportiv" – (The Medal "The Sportive Merit") class III.

== Managerial career ==
Ștefănescu started his coaching career in 1986, being a player-coach at FCM Brașov. After leading Brașov for three years, he went to work for a while in 1990 at Steaua București. There, he guided the team in the 1990–91 European Cup Winners' Cup campaign, as they eliminated Glentoran in the first round, but got defeated by Montpellier in the second one. Subsequently, he led Romania's under-21 national team between 1990 and 1991. Then he went to coach abroad at Al-Wakrah where he won the 1991 Qatar Sheikh Jassem Cup. Afterwards he came back to Romania, coaching at Selena Bacău and Politehnica Timișoara before working from 1994 to 1998 as Anghel Iordănescu's assistant at Romania's national team. In 1999, Ștefănescu went to work for Astra Ploiești, one year later moving to CSM Reșița in Divizia B. Subsequently, he went to coach abroad, first at Hapoel Tzafririm Holon in Israel and then at Qatari side Al Shoala. Between 2003 and 2005, he coached Al-Jaish Damascus where in 2004 he won the Syrian Cup and the AFC Cup, with the latter being won on the away goals rule after a 3–3 on aggregate against rivals Al-Wahda Damascus. He came back to Romania in 2006 to coach FC U Craiova for a short while. Since 2007, Ștefănescu went back to coaching abroad, first in Syria at Al-Wahda Damascus. Afterwards he went in Saudi Arabia at Najran SC, and in 2009 he worked for Al Tadamon in Kuwait. Between 2010 and 2012, Ștefănescu had a second spell at Al-Jaish Damascus. His last coaching spell was in 2012 at Qatari side Al Shamal.

Ștefănescu has a total of 203 matches as a manager in the Romanian top-division, Divizia A, consisting of 74 victories, 44 draws and 85 losses.

=== Managing style ===
Ștefănescu was known as a very meticulous and serious coach who did not like to joke around with his players. His former player from Politehnica Timișoara, Florin Bătrânu, said that he made a good impression with the team when he organized video analysis sessions of opponents, something rare during the 1990s Romanian football.

== Style of play ==
Ștefănescu described his style of play as:"The fact that I played both as a striker and a midfielder before becoming a libero helped me acquire good technique. In addition, I had intuition, composure and accurate passing. I saw the field well and made quite good long passes. Flaws? A slower reaction speed, but I compensated with placement."

Journalist Ioan Chirilă said about him:"When you look at Ștefănescu, you always get the impression that he forgot his diplomatic suitcase on a conference table, in Geneva or Stockholm. He speaks little, especially during the years when he was captain of Craiova and the national team. He weighs his words carefully. In his presence, jokes always become more modest. Even Cârțu obeys this rule. Elegance, a sense of anticipation, technique and the science of the long pass, all come together in his game. In football dictionaries, the word "libero" should have the explanation "Costică Ștefănescu"."

== Personal life and death ==
In 2003, Ștefănescu received the Honorary Citizen of Craiova title.

On 20 August 2013, at age 62, he died after he jumped from the fifth floor of the Military Hospital in Bucharest, where he had been receiving treatment for cancer. Over 1,500 people attended his funeral and he was buried with military honors in the "Sineasca" Cemetery in Craiova. At the funeral, former Romanian international Gheorghe Popescu praised Ștefănescu:"If you wanted to learn, you just looked at him and that was enough. I had this privilege and the extraordinary chance to be part of the same locker room as Costică Ștefănescu, because when I played in the schoolyard, in Calafat, I wanted to be none other than Costică Ștefănescu, then my dream came true to be part of the same locker room with him, to wear the captain's armband of Craiova, which he also wore. That's how I fell in love with the number 6, from Costică Ștefănescu. Even though I played with number 3 on the national team, there was no other number for me than 6, because of the love I had for him. The most wonderful thing that happened to me was to be part of the same locker room, as I told you, I consider myself privileged from this point of view".

== Honours ==
=== Player ===
Steaua București

- Cupa României: 1969–70, 1970–71

Universitatea Craiova

- Divizia A: 1973–74, 1979–80, 1980–81
- Cupa României: 1976–77, 1977–78, 1980–81, 1982–83

Romania

- Balkan Cup: 1977–80

Individual

- Romanian Footballer of the Year runner-up: 1979, 1981, 1982, 1985, (third place): 1978, 1980, 1983, 1984
- Ballon d'Or: 1983 (23th place)

=== Manager ===
Al-Wakrah

- Qatar Sheikh Jassem Cup: 1991

Al-Jaish Damascus

- Syrian Cup: 2004
- AFC Cup: 2004
