= Rodion Cămătaru =

Romanian footballer (born 1958)

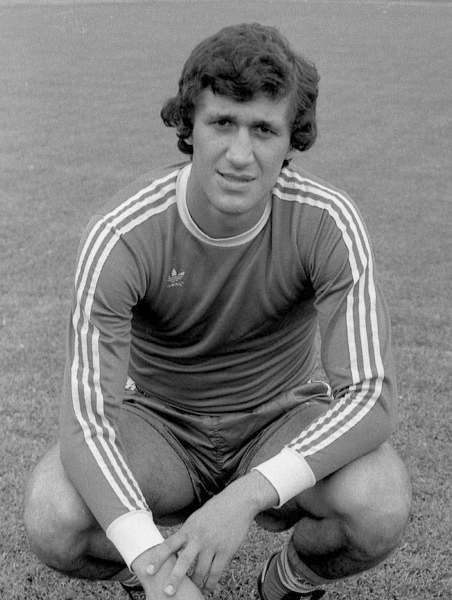
- Cămătaru with U Craiova circa 1983

Personal information
- Full name: Rodion Gorun Cămătaru
- Date of birth: 22 June 1958 (age 68)
- Place of birth: Strehaia, Romania
- Height: 1.90 m (6 ft 3 in)
- Position: Forward

Youth career
- 1970–1974: Progresul Strehaia

Senior career*
Years	Team	Apps	(Gls)
1974–1986	Universitatea Craiova	289	(122)
1986–1989	Dinamo București	89	(76)
1989–1990	Charleroi	29	(6)
1991–1993	Heerenveen	71	(26)
Total		478	(230)

International career
1978–1990	Romania	74	(21)
1979	Romania University		
Medal record
Representing Romania
World University Games
Bronze medal – third place	1979 Mexico City	Team competition
- * Club domestic league appearances and goals

Rodion Gorun Cămătaru (Romanian: [rodiˈon kəməˈtaru]; born 22 June 1958) is a Romanian former professional footballer who played as a forward.

He is best known for his prolific scoring record in Romanian domestic football, particularly with Universitatea Craiova and Dinamo București.

Cămătaru began his senior career with Universitatea Craiova in 1974, where he played a key role during the club's most successful period. He won two Romanian league titles (1980, 1981) and four Cupa României trophies (1977, 1978, 1981, 1983), scoring over 120 goals for the club. In 1986, he transferred to Dinamo București, where he became the league's top scorer in the 1986–87 season with 44 goals and was awarded the European Golden Shoe, an honor that later became a subject of controversy.

Internationally, Cămătaru represented Romania from 1978 to 1990, earning 74 caps and scoring 21 goals. He was part of the squad at the 1984 European Championship and the 1990 World Cup.

After retiring from football, Cămătaru pursued business ventures and is now an active entrepreneur. Across his domestic career, he made more than 370 appearances in Romania’s top division, scoring nearly 200 goals.

== Club career ==
=== Universitatea Craiova ===
Cămătaru was born on 22 June 1958 in Strehaia, Romania and began playing football in 1972 at local club Progresul. Two years later he went to play for Universitatea Craiova, making his Divizia A debut on 10 November 1974, aged 17 under coach Constantin Cernăianu in a 1–1 draw against CFR Cluj. He spent twelve seasons with Universitatea, being part of the "Craiova Maxima" generation that won two consecutive league titles in 1980 and 1981. He was the team's top-scorer in both, as in the first he scored 17 goals in the 26 appearances gave to him by coach Valentin Stănescu and in the second he scored 23 in the 33 matches under coach Ion Oblemenco. He also won the Cupa României four times, playing in all the finals, opening the score in the 3–1 win against Olimpia Satu Mare in the one in 1978 and he scored twice in the 2–1 victory over Politehnica Timișoara in the 1983 final.

Cămătaru played 37 games and scored six goals for "U" Craiova in European competitions. In the first round of the 1979–80 UEFA Cup he scored twice to help the team get past Wiener Sport-Club. In the following round he played in both legs of the 4–0 aggregate win over Leeds United, as Universitatea became the first Romanian club that eliminated a team from England in European competitions. Afterwards, they reached the quarter-finals of the 1981–82 European Cup after eliminating Olympiacos and Kjøbenhavns Boldklub, with Cămătaru scoring once against the latter, being eliminated with 3–1 on aggregate by Bayern Munich. He made nine appearances in the 1982–83 UEFA Cup campaign when they reached the semi-finals, being defeated by Benfica on the away goal rule after 1–1 on aggregate. At one point he was heavily criticized by journalist Eugen Barbu in the Informația Bucureștiului newspaper, Cămătaru, in turn called the article "a blasphemy". However, after the 0–0 in the first leg of the semi-final against Benfica in which Cămătaru was all over the field helping the defense, midfield and offense, Barbu wrote another article titled: "M-ai învins, Rodioane!" (English: "You defeated me, Rodion!"). Subsequently, Cămătaru contributed five matches to the 1984–85 UEFA Cup run, helping "U" navigate past Real Betis and Olympiacos before they ultimately fell to Željezničar, against whom he scored once in the round of 16.

During his time with The Blue Lions, Cămătaru received offers to play abroad. The first came from Fiorentina after the Italians got eliminated by them in the 1982–83 UEFA Cup, but the transfer was blocked by Romania's communist regime, which rarely allowed players to move abroad at the time. He later attracted interest from Benfica, where Sven-Göran Eriksson had been aware of him since 1983. In 1985, following the renovation of the Estádio da Luz, Cămătaru was invited to play in an exhibition match against Porto. Benfica attempted to sign him permanently, but the transfer was again prevented by the regime's restrictions.

=== Dinamo București ===
Regarding the European Golden Shoe controversy, Cămătaru stated:

"What controversy?! I don't know of any controversy. Do you think I was going around telling others: 'Get out the way?!'.. I have the trophy at home! No one took it from me."

— Rodion Cămătaru, Gazeta Sporturilor, December 2025.

In 1986, Cămătaru was transferred to Dinamo București, where he became the Divizia A top-scorer and European Golden Boot winner in his first season at the club with 44 goals in 33 games. However, as he scored 26 goals in the last nine matches of the season, his European Golden Boot was revoked after FIFA investigations claimed the goals were unfairly scored and the trophy was awarded to Toni Polster but Cămătaru was allowed to keep his copy of the trophy. In 1987, he was nominated for the Ballon d'Or, and during the 1980s he was on five occasions in the top five of the Romanian Footballer of the Year award, two times being ranked third.

Cămătaru played 10 matches and scored once for Dinamo in the European Cup Winners' Cup over the course of three seasons. Most notably in the 1988–89 campaign he was used by coach Mircea Lucescu in all six games as The Red Dogs reached the quarter-finals, where they were eliminated on the away goals rule after 1–1 on aggregate by Sampdoria. On 14 June 1989, Cămătaru made his last Divizia A appearance in Dinamo's 5–1 win over Bihor Oradea, totaling 378 matches with 198 goals in the competition.

=== Charleroi ===
In 1989, he went to play in Belgium for top division side Charleroi. He made his Belgian First Division debut on 16 August 1989, with coach Eric Vanlessen using him for the full 90 minutes in the 3–0 home win over Mechelen. On 21 January 1991, he scored his first goal in a 1–1 draw against the same opponent. Over the course of a year and a half, Cămătaru made 29 appearances for Charleroi in the Belgian league, scoring six goals.

=== Heerenveen ===
The final spell of his career was at Heerenveen in Netherlands, where for a while he was teammates with compatriot Ioan Andone. He made his Eredivisie debut on 27 February 1991, under coach Fritz Korbach who played him for the entire match in a 1–0 home loss to Twente. On 2 March 1991, he scored his first goal for Heerenveen in a 1–0 home win over MVV Maastricht. The team was relegated at the end of his first season, but Cămătaru stayed with the club for two more seasons in the second league. He scored his last goal as a professional in the 1992–93 KNVB Cup final, which was lost with 6–2 to Ajax Amsterdam.

In 2020, with the occasion of Heerenveen's 100th anniversary, Cămătaru was selected the best striker in the club's history in front of Ruud van Nistelrooy and Klaas-Jan Huntelaar.

== International career ==
Cămătaru played 73 matches and scored 21 goals for Romania, making his debut on 13 December 1978 under coach Ștefan Kovács in a 2–1 friendly loss to Greece. He played two games in the Euro 1980 qualifiers, then scored one goal in the 4–1 victory against Yugoslavia in the second leg of the 1977–80 Balkan Cup final.

Cămătaru played six games and scored two goals during the successful Euro 1984 qualifiers, including one against goalkeeper Thomas Ravelli after a long pass from Costică Ștefănescu and a 30 meters run in a 1–0 win over Sweden at the Råsunda Stadium. Afterwards he was used by coach Mircea Lucescu in all three matches in the final tournament which were a draw against Spain and losses to West Germany and Portugal in Romania's group stage exit.

He played six games and scored three goals in the 1986 World Cup qualifiers, including a spectacular one at the Wembley Stadium against goalkeeper Peter Shilton in a 1–1 draw against England. In the following years, Cămătaru played four games in the Euro 1988 qualifiers and made five appearances during the successful 1990 World Cup qualifiers, scoring twice in a 3–1 away victory over Bulgaria. He was also part of the squad that participated in the final tournament, where coach Emeric Jenei did not use him in any games. Cămătaru's last appearance for the national team was in the Euro 1992 qualifiers, scoring Romania's goal in a 2–1 loss to Scotland.

For representing his country at the 1990 World Cup, Cămătaru was decorated by President of Romania Traian Băsescu on 25 March 2008 with the Ordinul "Meritul Sportiv" – (The Medal "The Sportive Merit") class III.

== Personal life ==
Sports commentator Ilie Dobre wrote a book about him titled Rodion Cămătaru - tunarul din Bănie (Rodion Cămătaru - the gunner from Bănie), which was released in 1996. In 2003, Cămătaru received the Honorary Citizen of Craiova title.

== Career statistics ==
Appearances and goals by national team and year.
National team	Year	Apps	Goals
Romania	1978	2	0
Romania	1979	3	0
Romania	1980	7	2
Romania	1981	6	2
Romania	1982	6	2
Romania	1983	10	3
Romania	1984	7	1
Romania	1985	8	3
Romania	1986	6	2
Romania	1987	4	0
Romania	1988	7	4
Romania	1989	5	0
Romania	1990	3	2
Total		74	21

Scores and results list Romania's goal tally first, score column indicates score after each Cămătaru goal.

List of international goals scored by Rodion Cămătaru
#	Date	Venue	Opponent	Score	Result	Competition
1	6 June 1980	Stade du Heysel, Brussels, Belgium	Belgium	1–0	1–2	Friendly
2	27 August 1980	Stadionul 23 August, Bucharest, Romania	Yugoslavia	2–0	4–1	1977–80 Balkan Cup
3	25 March 1981	Stadionul 23 August, Bucharest, Romania	Poland	1–0	2–0	Friendly
4	15 April 1981	Københavns Idrætspark, Copenhagen, Denmark	Denmark	1–0	1–2	Friendly
5	14 April 1982	Gradski stadion, Ruse, Bulgaria	Bulgaria	1–1	2–1	Friendly match
6	1 May 1982	Stadionul Corvinul, Hunedoara, Romania	Cyprus	2–0	3–1	Euro 1984 qualifiers
7	2 February 1983	Olympic Winner Crown Prince Constantine, Larissa, Greece	Greece	2–1	3–1	Friendly
8	2 February 1983	Olympic Winner Crown Prince Constantine, Larissa, Greece	Greece	3–1	3–1	Friendly
9	9 June 1983	Råsunda Fotbollsstadion, Solna, Sweden	Sweden	1–0	1–0	Euro 1984 qualifiers
10	29 July 1984	Stadionul 23 August, Iași, Romania	China	2–0	4–2	Friendly
11	3 April 1985	Stadionul Central, Craiova, Romania	Turkey	2–0	3–0	1986 World Cup qualifiers
12	3 April 1985	Stadionul Central, Craiova, Romania	Turkey	3–0	3–0	1986 World Cup qualifiers
13	11 September 1985	Wembley Stadium, London, England	England	1–1	1–1	1986 World Cup qualifiers
14	23 April 1986	Stadionul 1 Mai, Timișoara, Romania	Soviet Union	2–1	2–1	Friendly
15	8 October 1986	Ramat Gan Stadium, Ramat Gan, Israel	Israel	3–1	4–2	Friendly
16	20 September 1988	Stadionul 1 Mai, Constanța, Romania	Albania	3–0	3–0	Friendly
17	19 October 1988	Vasil Levski National Stadium, Sofia, Bulgaria	Bulgaria	2–1	3–1	1990 World Cup qualifiers
18	19 October 1988	Vasil Levski National Stadium, Sofia, Bulgaria	Bulgaria	3–1	3–1	1990 World Cup qualifiers
19	23 November 1988	Stadionul Municipal, Sibiu, Romania	Israel	1–0	3–0	Friendly
20	21 May 1990	Stadionul 23 August, Bucharest, Romania	Egypt	1–0	1–0	Friendly
21	12 September 1990	Hampden Park, Glasgow, Scotland	Scotland	1–0	1–2	Euro 1992 qualifiers

== Honours ==
Universitatea Craiova

- Divizia A: 1979–80, 1980–81
- Cupa României: 1976–77, 1977–78, 1980–81, 1982–83

Dinamo București

- Cupa României runner-up: 1986–87, 1987–88, 1988–89

Heerenveen

- KNVB Cup runner-up: 1992–93

Romania

- Balkan Cup: 1977–80

Individual

- Divizia A top scorer: 1986–87
- European Golden Shoe: 1986–87 (revoked) (Note: Original 1986–87 season winner Rodion Cămătaru (with 44 goals) was disqualified later and the trophy was awarded to Toni Polster in 1990. However, Cămătaru was allowed to keep his copy of the trophy.)
- Ballon d'Or: 1987 (21st place)
- Romanian Footballer of the Year (third place): 1982, 1987
