= Zoltán Ritli =

Romanian footballer

Personal information
- Date of birth: 13 July 1968 (age 58)
- Place of birth: Satu Mare, Romania
- Height: 1.81 m (5 ft 11 1/2 in)
- Position: Goalkeeper

Youth career
- –1991: Olimpia Satu Mare

Senior career*
Years	Team	Apps	(Gls)
1991–1994	Inter Sibiu	82	(0)
1994–1996	Universitatea Cluj	25	(0)
1996–2000	Steaua București	56	(0)
2000–2001	Rocar București		
Total		163	(0)

Managerial career
- 2002–2003: Olimpia Satu Mare
- 2003–2005: Oaşul Negreşti
- 2006–2013: AS Viitorul 2006
- 2013–2014: Victoria Apa
- 2014–2015: Ugocea Porumbeşti
- 2015–2016: FCM Baia Mare (technical director)
- 2017: Recolta Dorolț (technical director)
- 2017: Olimpia Satu Mare
- 2018: Recolta Dorolț
- 2018–2021: CSM Satu Mare
- 2021–2024: CSM Olimpia Satu Mare (technical director)
- 2024–2026: CSM Olimpia Satu Mare (assistant)
- 2025: CSM Olimpia Satu Mare (caretaker)
- * Club domestic league appearances and goals

Zoltán Ritli (born 13 July 1968) is a Romanian professional football manager and former player.

== Honours ==
=== Player ===
Steaua București

- Divizia A: 1996–97, 1997–98
- Cupa României: 1996–97, 1998–99
- Supercupa României: 1998

Rocar București

- Cupa României runner-up: 2000–01

=== Coach ===
CSM Satu Mare

- Liga IV – Satu Mare County: 2018–19, 2019–20
