= Liga IV Satu Mare =

Fourth tier Romanian football league

- Founded: 1968
- Country: Romania
- Level on pyramid: 4
- Promotion to: Liga III
- Relegation to: Liga V Satu Mare
- Domestic cup: Cupa României – County phase
- Current champions: Talna Orașu Nou (1s title) (2025–26)
- Most championships: Victoria Carei (6 titles)
- Website: frf-ajf.ro/satu-mare
- Current: 2025–26 Liga IV Satu Mare

Liga IV Satu Mare is one of the regional football divisions of Liga IV, the fourth tier of the Romanian football league system, for clubs based in Satu Mare County, and is organized by AJF Satu Mare – Asociația Județeană de Fotbal (lit. 'County Football Association').

It is contested by a variable number of teams, depending on the number of teams relegated from Liga III, the number of teams promoted from Liga V Satu Mare, and the teams that withdraw or enter the competition. The winner may or may not be promoted to Liga III, depending on the result of a promotion play-off contested against the winner of a neighboring county series.

== History ==
In 1968, following the new administrative and territorial reorganization of the country, each county established its own football championship, integrating teams from the former regional championships as well as those that had previously competed in town and rayon level competitions. The freshly formed Satu Mare County Championship was placed under the authority of the newly created Consiliul Județean pentru Educație Fizică și Sport (lit. 'County Council for Physical Education and Sports') in Satu Mare County.

Since then, the structure and organization of Liga IV Satu Mare, like those of other county championships, have undergone numerous changes. Between 1968 and 1992, the main county competition was known as the Campionatul Județean (County Championship). Between 1992 and 1997, it was renamed Divizia C – Faza Județeană (Divizia C – County Phase), followed by Divizia D starting in 1997, and since 2006, it has been known as Liga IV.

== Promotion ==
The champions of each county association play against one another in a play-off to earn promotion to Liga III. Geographical criteria are taken into consideration when the play-offs are drawn. In total, there are 41 county champions plus the Bucharest municipal champion.

== List of Champions ==
Ed.	Season	Winners
County Championship
1	1968–69	Rapid Satu Mare
2	1969–70	Spartac Satu Mare
3	1970–71	Voința Carei
4	1971–72	Forestiera Bixad
5	1972–73	Oașul Negrești-Oaș
6	1973–74	Unirea Tășnad
7	1974–75	Constructorul Satu Mare
8	1975–76	Minerul Turț
9	1976–77	Sticla Poiana Codrului
10	1977–78	Minerul Turț
11	1978–79	Metalul Carei
12	1979–80	Unio Satu Mare
13	1980–81	Chimia Tășnad
14	1981–82	Unio Satu Mare
15	1982–83	Unio Satu Mare
16	1983–84	Constructorul Satu Mare
17	1984–85	Stăruița Berveni
18	1985–86	Foresta Satu Mare
19	1986–87	Someșul Odoreu
20	1987–88	Foresta Satu Mare
21	1988–89	Voința Negrești-Oaș
22	1989–90	Minerul Turț
23	1990–91	Ardudeana Ardud
24	1991–92	Samus Satu Mare
Divizia C – County phase
25	1992–93	Dacia '92 Grăniceri Satu Mare
26	1993–94	Oașul Negrești-Oaș
27	1994–95	Dacia '92 Grăniceri Satu Mare
28	1995–96	Someșul Satu Mare
29	1996–97	Victoria Carei
Divizia D
30	1997–98	Someșul Satu Mare
31	1998–99	Oașul Negrești-Oaș
32	1999–00	Șoimii Satu Mare
33	2000–01	Frontiera Satu Mare
34	2001–02	Victoria Carei
35	2002–03	Minerul Turț
36	2003–04	Florența Odoreu
37	2004–05	Fink Fenster Petrești
38	2005–06	Minerul Turț

Ed.	Season	Winners
Liga IV
39	2006–07	Turul Micula
40	2007–08	Victoria Carei
41	2008–09	Turul Micula
42	2009–10	Victoria Carei
43	2010–11	Olimpia Satu Mare
44	2011–12	Someșul Cărășeu
45	2012–13	Someșul Cărășeu
46	2013–14	Someșul Oar
47	2014–15	Olimpia Satu Mare II
48	2015–16	Recolta Dorolț
49	2016–17	Unirea Tășnad
50	2017–18	Energia Negrești-Oaș
51	2018–19	Satu Mare
52	2019–20	Satu Mare
53	2020–21	Victoria Carei
54	2021–22	Victoria Carei
55	2022–23	Olimpia MCMXXI Satu Mare
56	2023–24	Oașul Negrești-Oaș
57	2024–25	Unirea Tășnad
58	2025–26	Talna Orașu Nou

== See also ==
=== Main Leagues ===
- Liga I
- Liga II
- Liga III
- Liga IV

=== County Leagues (Liga IV series) ===
North–East

- Liga IV Bacău
- Liga IV Botoșani
- Liga IV Iași
- Liga IV Neamț
- Liga IV Suceava
- Liga IV Vaslui

North–West

- Liga IV Bihor
- Liga IV Bistrița-Năsăud
- Liga IV Cluj
- Liga IV Maramureș
- Liga IV Satu Mare
- Liga IV Sălaj

Center

- Liga IV Alba
- Liga IV Brașov
- Liga IV Covasna
- Liga IV Harghita
- Liga IV Mureș
- Liga IV Sibiu

West

- Liga IV Arad
- Liga IV Caraș-Severin
- Liga IV Gorj
- Liga IV Hunedoara
- Liga IV Mehedinți
- Liga IV Timiș

South–West

- Liga IV Argeș
- Liga IV Dâmbovița
- Liga IV Dolj
- Liga IV Olt
- Liga IV Teleorman
- Liga IV Vâlcea

South

- Liga IV Bucharest
- Liga IV Călărași
- Liga IV Giurgiu
- Liga IV Ialomița
- Liga IV Ilfov
- Liga IV Prahova

South–East

- Liga IV Brăila
- Liga IV Buzău
- Liga IV Constanța
- Liga IV Galați
- Liga IV Tulcea
- Liga IV Vrancea
