= Gheorghe Staicu =

Romanian footballer and manager (1935–2021)

Personal information
- Date of birth: 18 December 1935
- Place of birth: Bucharest, Romania
- Date of death: 10 June 2021 (aged 85)
- Place of death: Popești-Leordeni, Romania
- Height: 1.80 m (5 ft 11 in)
- Position: Defender

Senior career*
Years	Team	Apps	(Gls)
1957–1963	Steaua București	65	(0)

Managerial career
- 1973–1974: Olimpia Satu Mare
- 1975–1976: Bihor Oradea (assistant)
- 1977–1979: Olimpia Satu Mare
- 1979: Romania (assistant)
- 1980–1981: Universitatea Cluj
- 1981–1982: Bihor Oradea
- 1983–1992: Romania Olympic & youth
- 1993: FC Brașov
- 1996: Jiul Petroșani
- 1997–1998: Baia Mare
- 1998: Olimpia Satu Mare
- 2001–2002: UM Timișoara
- 2006–2007: Romania (W)
- * Club domestic league appearances and goals

Gheorghe "Gigi" Staicu (18 December 1935 – 10 June 2021) was a Romanian professional football player and manager who played for Steaua București, having developed in the club's academy. After retirement, Staicu started his manager career and was the manager of many Divizia A clubs, among them: Olimpia Satu Mare, Bihor Oradea, Universitatea Cluj or UM Timișoara. Staicu was also the assistant coach of the Romania national team, in the spell of Ștefan Kovacs and was for years the manager of the Olympic team.

== Late years and death ==
In 2007, Staicu retired from football and since 2012 he was hospitalized in an asylum for the elderly, suffering from Alzheimer's disease. He died on 10 June 2021, at the age of 85.

== Honours ==
=== Player ===
Steaua București

- Divizia A: 1959–60, 1960–61
- Cupa României: 1961–62

=== Manager ===
Olimpia Satu Mare

- Divizia B: 1973–74, 1976–77
- Cupa României: runner-up 1977–78

Bihor Oradea

- Divizia B: 1974–75, 1981–82
