= FC Olimpia Satu Mare =

Olimpia Satu Mare
- Full name: Fotbal Club Olimpia MCMXXI Satu Mare
- Nicknames: Galben-Albaștrii (The Yellow and Blues); Oli
- Short name: Olimpia
- Founded: 1921; 105 years ago 2010; 16 years ago (refounded); 2018; 8 years ago (refounded)
- Ground: Someșul
- Capacity: 6,000
- Owners: Olimpia's Volunteers
- 2025–26: Liga III, Seria VIII, 11th (relegated)
- Website: https://fcolimpia.ro/
Home colours	Away colours	Third colours

Fotbal Club Olimpia MCMXXI Satu Mare, commonly known as Olimpia Satu Mare, Olimpia MCMXXI or simply Olimpia, is a Romanian professional football club from Satu Mare, Satu Mare County. Founded on 5 May 1921 and re-founded in 2010 and 2018, Olimpia played seven seasons in the Romanian top flight between 1937 and 1999 and reached the Romanian Cup final in 1978.

== History ==
Olimpia Satu Mare was founded in 1921, competing at first in the Oradea district championships, and among the first players registered at that time were Mihalca, Gh. Șuta, D. Pop, Gross, Nyul, Frank, Rațiu, Sabău, Winkler, Șoranu, Hotyar, and Kokenessi. Later evolving in the district championships of Maramureș and Satu Mare, Olimpia won the title four times.

In the 1925–26 season, Olimpia reached the preliminary round of the national championship, losing 3–4 to Stăruința Oradea. In the following two seasons, Olimpia was again eliminated by the same team: 0–1 in 1926–27 and 0–1 in 1927–28. In the 1931–32 season, the club reached the first round of the Northern League but lost, after two matches, to Crișana Oradea.

In 1934, Olimpia CFR reached the quarter-finals of the first-ever Cupa României, defeating Brașovia Brașov 6–1 and Crișana Oradea 3–1, before being eliminated 1–6 by Universitatea Cluj. The squad included Baros, Abrudan, Szabo, Vajda II, Szerenyi I, Rakosi, Huniade, Popp, Vajda I, Szerenyi II, and Matișan.

Olimpia participated in the inaugural season of Divizia B and finished 2nd in Series III the following year. After finishing 4th in the West Series of the 1936–37 season, the team was promoted to Divizia A due to the expansion of the top division, which allowed the top four teams from each second-division series to move up.

Unfortunately, Olimpia finished last in Group I of the 1937–38 Divizia A season and was relegated. Back in the second division, the team placed 6th in the North-West Series in 1938–39 and 8th in Series III in 1939–40.

Following the Second Vienna Award of 30 August 1940, which ceded Northern Transylvania from Romania to Hungary, Olimpia was integrated into the Hungarian football league system. The club returned to Romanian football only after World War II, competing in the 1946–47 Divizia C season.

After the dissolution of Divizia C, Olimpia merged with Sanitas Satu Mare, which had finished 1st and was promoted to Divizia B. The merged club was renamed CFR Satu Mare and played in Series IV of the 1947–48 Divizia B season, finishing 6th. The following season, the team ranked 8th in Series II.

In 1950, the club was renamed Locomotiva Satu Mare, finishing 10th in Series II. In 1951, it ranked 6th, and in 1952 it was renamed Progresul Satu Mare, finishing 12th in Series II. Results over the next seasons were mixed, with the team placing 4th in 1953, 10th in 1954, 8th in 1955, and finally 12th in 1956, which led to relegation.

Following relegation, the Yellow and Blues were renamed Someșul Satu Mare, after the river that flows through the city. The club competed in Series IV of the 1957–58 Divizia C season, finishing 11th, then 7th in Series V the following year. However, with the dissolution of Divizia C once again, the team was relegated to the regional championship.

After being renamed Voința Satu Mare in 1959, they finished 3rd in Series I of the 1959–60 Baia Mare Regional Championship and won the 1960–61 season of the renamed Maramureș Regional Championship, although they finished last in Series III of the promotion play-off held at Sinaia. In 1961, the second-division side Dinamo Săsar was moved to Satu Mare, merged with Voința Satu Mare, and renamed ASMD (Asociația Sportivă Muncitorească Dinamovistă, literally 'Workers’ Dinamo Sports Association') Satu Mare, competed in Series III of Divizia B, ranking 12th in 1961–62 and 10th in 1962–63.

After the second division was contracted to two series, the team continued in Series II, finishing 9th in the 1963–64 season. In 1964, it was renamed Sătmăreana Satu Mare but was relegated the following year after placing 13th in the 1964–65 campaign.

In Divizia C, Sătmăreana competed in the North Series, finishing 9th in 1965–66 and 4th in 1966–67. In 1967, the club was taken over by the stove manufacturing enterprise „1 Septembrie” and renamed Metalul Satu Mare, ending the 1967–68 season in 10th place under coach Gheorghe Ioviță Iovicin, with Alexandru Pop taking charge in February 1968.

Former logo, used until 2024.

In 1968, Metalul merged with Unio Satu Mare, the team of Întreprinderea de Utilaj Minier (lit. 'Mining Equipment Enterprise'), which would later be re-established in the county championship, to form Olimpia Satu Mare. Olimpia won Series VII of the 1968–69 season and finished 1st in Group II of the promotion play-off held in Cluj, earning promotion to Divizia B. The squad coached by Alexandru Pop included Șt. Báthori, Feher, Less, Jula, I. Popa, Knoblau, Bocșa, Gero, Both, I. Pop, Bokor, Borota, Kincses, Filip, I. Báthori, and Șamu.

In the second division, Olimpia competed in Series II, finishing 6th in both the 1969–70 and 1970–71 seasons under coach Alexandru Pop. From 1971, the team was taken over by Gheorghe Staicu, who led Olimpia to 9th place in 1971–72, and 3rd in 1972–73. At the end of the 1973–74 season, Olimpia returned to Divizia A after a thirty-seven-year absence, having won Series III. The squad, led by Staicu and his assistant Vasile Savaniu, with Ștefan Onisie serving briefly as a technical adviser, included Șt. Báthori, Filip, Bigan, Knoblau, Bocșa, Naom, Keizer, Libra, Borota, I. Báthori, Helvei, Both, and Dumitriu.

Olimpia spent two consecutive campaigns in the top flight. In the 1974–75 season, the team began under Gheorghe Staicu, who guided it to the Round of 32 of the Cupa României, where it lost 0–1 to Progresul Brăila, before he was replaced in March 1975 by Gheorghe Bay, who led the side to a 9th-place finish. Ahead of the 1975–76 season, Traian Ionescu was appointed head coach with Gheorghe Ola as his assistant, but a medical indisposition prevented Ionescu from continuing, and Ola took charge from November 1975 until the end of the campaign, leading the team to a 16th-place finish and relegation to the second division, while its Cup run again ended in the Round of 32 after a 1–4 defeat against Steaua București. The lineup for that match comprised Șt. Báthori – Bereczki, Al. Matei (69' Filip), S. Popescu, Bocșa – V. Mureșan, Knoblau, Keizer (46' I. Báthori) – Helvei, Iancu, N. Popa.

Despite the setback, Olimpia managed to bounce back the following season by winning Series III and securing promotion. The team also reached the Round of 32 of the Romanian Cup, losing 0–1 to ICIM Brașov. The squad, led by Gheorghe Staicu and his assistant Ștefan Czako, included Pustai, Șt. Báthori, Ghencean, V. Mureșan, S. Popescu, Keizer, Al. Matei, Smarandache, Bocșa, Both, Bereczki, Filip, Ress, Chevari, Helvei, N. Popa, Borota, N. Marcu, and Goia.

In the 1977–78 season, Olimpia finished 13th in Divizia A and reached the final of the Cupa României, where they lost 1–3 at Republicii Stadium in Bucharest to a strong Universitatea Craiova side. The lineup, coached by Gheorghe Staicu, included Feher – M. Popa, Smarandache, N. Marcu, Pinter – Sabou (73' Bocșa), Keizer, I. Báthori – V. Mureșan, Hațeganu, Both (65' Helvei).

This was followed by a 10th-place finish in the 1978–79 season and a surprising 0–5 defeat in the Round of 32 of the Cupa României to Politehnica Iași. The lineup fielded by Staicu comprised Haralambie (35' Feher) – Mureșan, Smarandache, Al. Matei, Pop – Keizer, Sabou (57' N. Popa), I. Báthori – Helvei, Pataki, N. Marcu.

The poor results at the start of the 1979–80 season, with just three points and no wins after ten rounds, led to the replacement of Staicu with his assistant Ștefan Czako, while Gheorghe Ene joined the technical staff as assistant coach during the winter break. Czako led Olimpia to the Round of 32 of the Cupa României, where the team faced Universitatea Craiova in a rematch of the 1978 final, losing 0–1 after extra time on neutral ground in Timișoara, with a lineup composed of Pustai – Pinter, N. Marcu, Al. Matei, I. Báthori – Sabou (33' Ghencean, 88' Helvei), Pop, Balogh – Hațeganu, Mureșan, Demarcek. However, the Yellow and Blues were relegated at the end of the campaign, finishing in 17th place.

In Divizia B, Olimpia competed in Series III and experienced a fluctuating path throughout the 1980s and early 1990s. The 1980–81 season began with Gheorghe Ene as head coach, but after thirteen rounds he became assistant following the appointment of Emerich Jenei as the new head coach, under whose leadership the team finished as runners-up.

Olimpia continued for two seasons with Vasile Savaniu as head coach, assisted by Iosif Kalmar, achieving 4th place in 1981–82, followed by 8th in 1982–83. With former player Gavril Both as head coach, the team placed 6th in 1983–84. In the 1984–85 season, Viorel Mureșan replaced Gavril Both at the winter break, leading the team until the end of the campaign, finishing 7th. The subsequent campaigns saw Olimpia finish 6th in 1985–86, with Ioan Naom as head coach and Viorel Mureșan as his assistant, and 11th in 1986–87, a season that began under Iosif Kalmar as head coach before he was replaced by Iosif Vigu in April 1987, with Nicolae Marcu serving as assistant.

In 1987, Olimpia merged once again with Unio Satu Mare, a club that had achieved promotion from the county championship to the second division within four years, and was renamed Olimpia IUM Satu Mare, managed by Iosif Vigu and assisted by Iosif Kalmar. Under their leadership, Olimpia entered a period of relative stability in the second division. In the 1987–88 season, the Yellow and Blues finished 6th, then recorded an impressive 3rd place in 1988–89, one of the club’s strongest results of the decade. The form dipped in 1989–90, when Olimpia ended the season in 12th place, but a recovery followed in 1990–92 with another solid 3rd-place finish. Vigu’s tenure concluded after the 1991–92 season, in which Olimpia ranked 9th. The following campaign saw a sharp downturn, with the team finishing 18th in Series III after a four-point deduction and being relegated to the third division.

Olimpia competed in Series IV of the third division, finishing 8th in the 1993–94 season before placing as runners-up in 1994–95, earning promotion through a play-off against CFR Cluj, the 16th-placed team in Series B of the second division. The match, played on neutral ground at Gloria Stadium in Bistrița, ended goalless, with Olimpia winning 4–1 on penalties. The lineup fielded by head coach Iosif Vigu included Suciu, Mucenica, Bencze, Tămășan, P. Mihai, Teger, Szabó (110' Centeri), Dragomir, P. Levente, Bolba (84' Nastai), and Fabian.

In the second division, Olimpia competed in Series II, finishing 12th in the 1995–96 season and 11th in the 1996–97 campaign, which also brought a notable Cupa României run, as the Yellow and Blues reached the Round of 16 before being eliminated by FC U Craiova after a scoreless draw and a 2–3 penalty shoot-out. In the 1997–98 season, Olimpia won its series, earning promotion to Divizia A. The squad, coached by Gavril Both and his assistant Mircea Bolba, included M. Tudor, Suciu, Mincu, Iodi, L. Csik, Mozacu, Cornaci, Ciocan, Szabó, Farcău, Gongolea, Dragomir, Erdei, Roșoagă, P. Mihai, Negrea, Cioloboc, C. Prodan, and Sg. Radu. Their stay in the first division was brief, as Olimpia was immediately relegated after finishing last in the 1998–99 season.

Olimpia was then a regular Divizia B presence, with no notable performances, the maximum reached was a 4th place at the end of the 2004–05 season. In 2006, the team relegated to Liga III where it had disastrous results, saving from relegation in the last moment for the next two seasons, then the club was relegated to Liga IV due to financial problems and reached the brink of collapse even suffering a major reorganization in 2010.

In the 2010–11 campaign, Olimpia won Liga IV – Satu Mare County and the promotion play-off match against Meseșul Treznea, Sălaj County champions, with an impressive 6–0 at the Iuliu Bodola Stadium in Oradea. The squad, led by Tiberiu Csik and his assistants Ion Dragomir and Paul Levente, consisted of Șuta – Moș, F. Mureșan, Heil, Vădan – M. Mureșan, M. Pop, Micaș, Gavrilescu, Marinaș, and Homorozan, while Lung, Shannat, Câmpan, and Feier also appeared during the match.

At the end of 2011–12 Liga III season, Olimpia finished only second, at 3 points distance from Corona Brașov, but promoted the next season with an advance of 5 points over FC Hunedoara. Then Olimpia becoming again a regular Liga II team, the best performance being 5th place, obtained at the end of 2014–15 season.

In the winter break of the 2017–18 season, Olimpia withdrew from Liga II due to financial problems, also having 70 points deducted. In the same time, the local authorities founded CSM Satu Mare, a new entity that pretend to be the successor of FC Olimpia, but has no legal connections with the old club.

After this second dissolution, supporters dissatisfied with the way the club had been administered organized themselves as Voluntarii Olimpiști (Olimpia’s Volunteers) and founded Olimpia MCMXXI, a fan-owned phoenix club. The new entity claimed continuity with FC Olimpia, although there was no legal connection between the former club and Olimpia MCMXXI.

Olimpia MCMXXI began competing in Liga V – Satu Mare County, the fifth tier of Romanian football and the second at county level, under head coach Ioan Donca, appointed immediately after the club’s re-establishment. Donca led the team to win Series A of the 2018–19 Liga V championship, securing promotion, and also guided Olimpia to win the Satu Mare County phase of the Cupa României.

In the following seasons, Olimpia MCMXXI competed in Liga IV – Satu Mare County. The Yellow and Blues were in 2nd place in Series A when the 2019–20 campaign was interrupted and later brought to an end after AJF Satu Mare concluded that the clubs could not meet the medical protocol requirements.

Following Ioan Donca’s departure in October 2020, Mircea Bolba was appointed head coach, but his tenure was cut short by his death in January. He was replaced by Ioan Dragomir, under whom Olimpia again finished 2nd in Series A and qualified for the county championship semi-finals of the shortened 2020–21 season, where it was eliminated by Victoria Carei after a 2–2 aggregate draw, losing 5–6 on penalties. In the 2021–22 season, Olimpia MCMXXI placed 3rd in Series A and went on to finish 6th in the championship play-off.

In 2021, the club obtained the rights to the “FC Olimpia Satu Mare” brand and announced itself as the official successor of the historic entity. This claim was later challenged in court, and in 2023 the registration of the brand was rejected, a decision upheld on appeal in 2024.

On the field, Olimpia MCMXXI returned to the national leagues under Cristian Popa, named head coach in January 2023. The Yellow and Blues had secured promotion to Liga III by winning the 2022–23 Liga IV – Satu Mare County and the promotion play-off against Luceafărul Bălan, the Sălaj County winners, 13–3 on aggregate (5–2 away and 8–1 at home). The squad included V. Duca, Oltean, Apai, Lung, Aidebe, Tser, Varga, Palinceac, Batin, M. Duca, Panin, Caba, Ștef, Micle, Srepnell, Bicknell, Gombar, Crainic, Padilla, and Emeriau.

Popa led Olimpia MCMXXI in Liga III until the winter break of the 2023–24 season, when the club entered a partnership with SoccerViza, a player development company led by Cecilia Lihv. Giuseppe Funicello, one of SoccerViza’s founders and partners, was appointed head coach. Under Funicello, Olimpia finished 9th in the regular season and narrowly avoided relegation, ultimately ending the play-out stage of Series X in 8th place, the same position achieved by the Yellow and Blues again in the following 2024–25 season. At the beginning of December 2025, after SoccerViza withdrew from the partnership, assistant coach Evran Akman took charge for the final two matches before the winter break of the 2025–26 campaign.

Chronology of names
Name	Period
Olimpia Satu Mare	1921–1932
Olimpia CFR Satu Mare	1932–1947
CFR Satu Mare	1947–1949
Locomotiva Satu Mare	1950–1952
Progresul Satu Mare	1952–1957
Voința Satu Mare	1957–1961
ASMD Satu Mare	1961–1965
Sătmăreana	1965–1967
Metalul Satu Mare	1967–1968
Olimpia Satu Mare	1968–present

== Stadium ==
Olimpia Satu Mare used to play its home matches on Daniel Prodan Stadium in Satu Mare, which has a capacity of 18,000. After its second re-foundation, in 2018, due to the conflict between supporters and local authorities, Olimpia started to play its home matches on Someșul Stadium in Satu Mare, with a capacity of 6,000 people. On Daniel Prodan Stadium started to play CSM Satu Mare, the club financially supported by the local authorities.

== Supporters ==
Olimpia has many supporters in Satu Mare and especially in Satu Mare County. The ultras groups of Olimpia Satu Mare are known as Commando Oli and Sezione Ostile. From 2015 the two groups merged and formed Peluza Olimpia 1921. Olimpia supporters consider Bihor Oradea supporters to be their allies, fans of both teams had the opportunity to support the other during matches.

== Honours ==
=== Leagues ===
Liga II

- Winners (3): 1973–74, 1976–77, 1997–98
- Runners-up (2): 1935–36, 1980–81

Liga III

- Winners (2): 1968–69, 2012–13
- Runners-up (2): 1994–95, 2011–12

Liga IV – Satu Mare County

- Winners (2): 2010–11, 2022–23

=== Cups ===
Cupa României

- Runners-up (1): 1977–78

== League and Cup history ==
Season	Tier	Division	Place	Notes	Cupa României
2025–26	3	Liga III (Seria VIII)	11th	Relegated	
2024–25	3	Liga III (Seria X)	8th		
2023–24	3	Liga III (Seria X)	8th		
2022–23	4	Liga IV (SM)	1st (C)	Promoted	
2021–22	4	Liga IV (SM)	6th		
2020–21	4	Liga IV (SM) (Seria A)	2nd		
2019–20	4	Liga IV (SM) (Seria A)	2nd		
2018–19	5	Liga V (SM) (Seria A)	1st (C)	Promoted	
2017–18	2	Liga II	20th	Relegated	
2016–17	2	Liga II	9th		Round of 32
2015–16	2	Liga II (Seria II)	9th		
2014–15	2	Liga II (Seria II)	5th		
2013–14	2	Liga II (Seria II)	7th		
2012–13	3	Liga III (Seria V)	1st (C)	Promoted	Round of 32
2011–12	3	Liga III (Seria VI)	2nd		
2010–11	4	Liga IV (SM) (Seria A)	1st (C)	Promoted	
2009–10	4	Liga IV (SM) (Seria A)	9th		
2007–08	3	Liga III (Seria VI)	13th	Bankruptcy	

Season	Tier	Division	Place	Notes	Cupa României
2006–07	3	Liga III (Seria VI)	15th		
2005–06	2	Divizia B (Seria III)	11th	Relegated	
2004–05	2	Divizia B (Seria III)	4th		Round of 32
2003–04	2	Divizia B (Seria III)	3rd		
2002–03	2	Divizia B (Seria II)	5th		
2001–02	2	Divizia B (Seria II)	13th		
2000–01	2	Divizia B (Seria II)	10th		
1999–00	2	Divizia B (Seria II)	5th		
1998–99	1	Divizia A	18th	Relegated	Round of 32
1997–98	2	Divizia B (Seria II)	1st (C)	Promoted	
1996–97	2	Divizia B (Seria II)	11th		Round of 16
1995–96	2	Divizia B (Seria II)	12th		
1994–95	3	Divizia C (Seria IV)	2nd	Promoted	
1993–94	3	Divizia C (Seria IV)	8th		
1992–93	2	Divizia B (Seria II)	18th	Relegated	
1991–92	2	Divizia B (Seria III)	9th		
1990–91	2	Divizia B (Seria III)	3rd		
1989–90	2	Divizia B (Seria III)	12th		

== Former managers ==
- (Romania) Alexandru Pop (1968–1971)
- (Romania) Gheorghe Staicu (1971–1974)
- (Romania) Gheorghe Bay (1975)
- (Romania) Traian Ionescu (1975)
- (Romania) Gheorghe Ola (1975–1976)
- (Romania) Gheorghe Staicu (1976–1979)
- (Romania) Ștefan Czako (1979–1980)
- (Romania) Gheorghe Ene (1980)
- (Romania) Emerich Jenei (1980–1981)
- (Romania) Vasile Savaniu (1981–1983)
- (Romania) Gavril Both (1983–1984)
- (Romania) Iosif Vigu (1987–1992)
- (Romania) Gavril Both (1997–1998)
- (Romania) Gheorghe Staicu (1998)
- (Romania) Gavril Both (1999)
- (Romania) Zoltan Ritli (2002–2003)
- (Hungary) József Kiprich (2003)
- (Hungary) József Kiprich (2004)
- (Romania) Mircea Bolba (2004–2006)
- (Romania) Florin Fabian (2007)
- (Romania) Mircea Bolba (2007)
- (Romania) Tiberiu Csik (2008–2014)
- (Romania) Cosmin Bodea (2014)
- (Romania) Tiberiu Csik (2014–2016)
- (Romania) Mircea Bolba (2016)
- (Romania) Bogdan Andone (2016–2017)
- (Romania) Zoltan Ritli (2017)
- (Romania) Tibor Selymes (2017)
- (Romania) Ioan Donca (2018–2019)
- (Romania) Mircea Bolba (2020–2021)
- (Romania) Ion Dragomir (2021–2022)
- (Romania) Cristian Popa (2023–2024)
- (United States) Giuseppe Funicello (2024–)
- (Moldova) Stefan Zobromovich
