= 1977–78 Cupa României =

Tournament details
- Country: Romania

Final positions
- Champions: Universitatea Craiova
- Runners-up: Olimpia Satu Mare

The 1977–78 Cupa României was the 40th edition of Romania's most prestigious football cup competition.

The title was won by Universitatea Craiova against Olimpia Satu Mare.

== Format ==
The competition is an annual knockout tournament.

First round proper matches are played on the ground of the lowest ranked team, then from the second round proper the matches are played on a neutral location.

In the first round proper, if a match is drawn after 90 minutes, the game goes in extra time, if the scored is still tight after 120 minutes, the team who played away will qualify, if the teams are from the same league, then the winner will be established at penalty kicks.

From the second round proper, if a match is drawn after 90 minutes, the game goes in extra time, if the scored is still tight after 120 minutes, then the winner will be established at penalty kicks.

From the first edition, the teams from Divizia A entered in competition in sixteen finals, rule which remained till today.

== First round proper ==
| Team 1 | Score | Team 2 |
|---|---|---|
19 February 1978
| Unirea Alexandria (Div. B) | 0–1 | (Div. A) Petrolul Ploiești |
| FC Brăila (Div. B) | 1–0 | (Div. A) CS Târgovişte |
| Steaua București (Div. A) | 2–0 | (Div. A) Sportul Studenţesc București |
| Progresul Vulcan București (Div. B) | 2–4 (a.e.t.) | (Div. A) SC Bacău |
| IS Câmpia Turzii (Div. C) | 2–1 | (Div. A) ASA 1962 Târgu Mureș |
| Recolta Diosig (Div. D) | 0–6 | (Div. A) FC Constanţa |
| Unirea Focşani (Div. C) | 0–1 | (Div. A) Argeş Piteşti |
| FCM Galaţi (Div. B) | 3–2 | (Div. A) Jiul Petroşani |
| Viitorul Gheorgheni (Div. C) | 0–3 | (Div. A) Politehnica Timişoara |
| Constructorul Iaşi (Div. C) | 2–5 | (Div. A) Corvinul Hunedoara |
| Avântul Mâneciu (Div. C) | 2–5 | (Div. A) Universitatea Craiova |
| Gaz Metan Mediaș (Div. B) | 1–1 (a.e.t.) | (Div. A) Politehnica Iași |
| Gloria Reşiţa (Div. C) | 0–1 | (Div. A) Olimpia Satu Mare |
| Chimia Râmnicu Vâlcea (Div. B) | 0–2 | (Div. A) Bihor Oradea |
| UTA Arad (Div. A) | 4–0 | (Div. A) FCM Reșița |
| Victoria Zalău (Div. D) | 0–7 | (Div. A) Dinamo București |

== Second round proper ==
| Team 1 | Score | Team 2 |
|---|---|---|
19 April 1978
| Dinamo București | 1–0 | FC Constanţa |
| UTA Arad | 3–1 | Petrolul Ploiești |
| SC Bacău | 0–1 | Argeş Piteşti |
| Corvinul Hunedoara | 2–2 (a.e.t.)(3–5 p) | Olimpia Satu Mare |
| Steaua București | 2–2 (a.e.t.)(5–6 p) | Politehnica Iași |
| Bihor Oradea | 0–3 | FCM Galaţi |
| Politehnica Timişoara | 1–3 | FC Brăila |
| Universitatea Craiova | 2–1 | IS Câmpia Turzii |

== Quarter-finals ==
| Team 1 | Score | Team 2 |
|---|---|---|
24 May 1978
| Olimpia Satu Mare | 1–0 | UTA Arad |
| Argeş Piteşti | 2–1 | FCM Galaţi |
| FC Brăila | 1–2 | Politehnica Iași |
| Dinamo București | 2–3 (a.e.t.) | Universitatea Craiova |

== Semi-finals ==
| Team 1 | Score | Team 2 |
|---|---|---|
18 June 1978
| Universitatea Craiova | 2–0 | Politehnica Iași |
| Olimpia Satu Mare | 1–0 (a.e.t.) | Argeş Piteşti |

== Final ==
22 June 1978
17:00 EET

| Universitatea Craiova | 3–1 | Olimpia Satu Mare |
|---|---|---|
| Cârțu 43'; Cămătaru 45'; Marcu 74' | Report | Helvei 76' |

Republicii, Bucharest
Attendance: 10,000
Referee: Romeo Stâncan (Bucharest)

Cupa României 1977–78 winners

2nd title
