= 2026–27 Cupa României =

Cupa României 2026–27

Tournament details
- Country: Romania
- Dates: 29 July 2026 – 12 May 2027
- Teams: 160 (42 qualifying competition); 132 (main competition incl. 7 qualifiers)

Tournament statistics
- Matches played: 100
- Goals scored: 364 (3.64 per match)
- (Note: All statistics do not include regional stage)

The 2026–27 Cupa României is the 89th season of the annual Romanian football cup competition. It is sponsored by Betano and known as the Cupa României Betano for sponsorship purposes. The winners would qualify for the first qualifying round of the 2026–27 UEFA Europa League. The main competition will pit teams from Liga I through Liga IV.

== Schedule ==
The schedule for this season of Cupa României was released on July 9.

Phase	Round	Clubs remaining	Clubs involved	From previous round	Entries in this round	Dates	Teams entering this round
Regional stage	Group stage	160	42	none	42	8, 11, 15 July 2026	42 2025–26 Liga IV teams
Regional stage	Finals	132	14	14	None	18 July 2026	None
National stage	First round	125	72	7	65	29 July 2026	65 2025–26 Liga III teams
National stage	Second round	89	50	36	14	5 August 2026	12 (Note: Three 5th placed teams not selected for the First round, four 4th placed teams, three 3rd placed teams and two 2nd placed teams that didn't promote to Liga II) 2025–26 Liga III teams 2 (Note: Two teams relegated at the end of the season were selected for this round) 2025–26 Liga II teams
National stage	Third round	64	48	25	23	12 August 2026	22 2026–27 Liga II teams 1 2025–26 Liga II team
National stage	Play-off round	40	32	24	8	19 August 2026	8 2025–26 Liga I teams (9–16)
National stage	Group stage	24	24	16	8	2 September 2026; 28 October 2026; 2 December 2026	8 2025–26 Liga I teams (1–8)
National stage	Quarter-finals	8	8	8	None	3 March 2027	None
National stage	Semi-finals	4	4	4	None	21 April 2027	None
National stage	Final	2	2	2	None	12 May 2027	None

== Regional stage ==
=== Finals ===
The finals of the regional stage were played on July 18.

18 July 2026 North-East final	Bradul Putna (3)	7–0	Hușana Huși (3)	Putna
17:30 EEST (UTC+03)				Stadium: Local; Referee: Moisă Mihai-Lucian

18 July 2026 North-West final	Chieșd (4)	2–0	CA Oradea (4)	Chieșd
17:30 EEST (UTC+03)				Stadium: Bază sportiva Chieșd; Referee: Bodocan Paul Narcis Ionuț

18 July 2026 Center final	Corona Brașov (3)	5–0	Viitorul Amo Barcani (4)	Brașov
17:30 EEST (UTC+03)				Stadium: Carpați; Referee: Mailat Horațiu Ioan

18 July 2026 West final	Deva (3)	2–3	Caransebeș (4)	Deva
17:30 EEST (UTC+03)				Stadium: Cetate; Referee: Ştefănescu Deian Petru

18 July 2026 South-West final	Domnești (4)	2–0	Viitorul Budești (4)	Domnești
17:30 EEST (UTC+03)				Stadium: Comunal; Referee: Dumitru Robert Marian

18 July 2026 South final	Bolintin-Vale (4)	4–0	Viitorul Corbeanca (3)	Bolintin-Vale
17:30 EEST (UTC+03)				Stadium: Sintetic; Referee: Gherman Razvan-Gabriel

18 July 2026 South-East final	Petrolul Berca (3)	3–0	Victoria Gugeşti (4)	Berca
17:30 EEST (UTC+03)				Stadium: Petrolul; Referee: Cojocaru Sebastian

== National stage ==
=== First round ===
All matches were played on July 29. Out of the 7 regional qualifier winners, only ACS FC Chieșd failed to make it through to the next round.

29 July 2026	Târgu Jiu	3–2	Vulturii Fărcășești	Târgu Jiu
17:30 EEST (UTC+03)	Habet Costel Marian 15' (yellow card) 16'; Constantino Da Silva Elton 41' (yellow card) 5'; Bucur Denis Ionuţ 66'		Popescu Alexandru Ionuţ 45+1', 48'; Marica Florin Marian (yellow card) 35'; Dănescu Marian Robert (yellow card) 45+2'; Oprişa Florin Bogdan (yellow card) 67'; Scurtu Luis Nicolae (yellow card) 72'	Stadium: Municipal; Referee: Adelin Pavel

29 July 2026	Plopeni	1–2	Băicoi	Plopeni
17:30 EEST (UTC+03)	Moraru Marian Ştefan Andrei 60'; Rusu Nicuşor Andrei (yellow card) 88'; Constantin Mădălin (yellow card) 90+5'		Florea Răzvan Gabriel 32'; Brăilă David Mihăiţă 90+2'; Dumitraşcu Constantin Gabriel (yellow card) 56'	Stadium: Gheorghe Șilaev; Referee: Cosmin Ionut Lungu

29 July 2026	Urban Titu	1–3	Voința Crevedia	Titu
17:30 EEST (UTC+03)	Stoica Robert Ionuţ 43'; Soșa Robert Ionuț (yellow card) 69'		Dragu Claudiu Georgian 40', 88'; Burlacu Dorin Eduard 80'; Dima Albert Georgian (yellow card) 52'	Stadium: Hagioaica; Referee: Alexandru-Patru Stoica

29 July 2026	Timișul Șag	1–0	Progresul Pecica	Șag
17:30 EEST (UTC+03)	Boariu Denis Mircea 22'; Sturzu Mădălin Florin (yellow card) 2'; Munteanu Raul (yellow card) 17'; Popa Raul Alexandru (yellow card) 90+3'		Rusu Mario (yellow card) 34'	Stadium: Comunal; Referee: Raul-Oliviu Balaiban

29 July 2026	Unirea Dej	1–2	Viitorul Cluj	Dej
17:30 EEST (UTC+03)	Enache Iustin 49'; Dinu Mihăiţă Cristinel (yellow card) 57'; Sucitu Bogdan Dorin (yellow card) 86'; Szőke Lénárd (yellow card) 87'		Mircea David Andrei 21'; Herciu Antonio Laurenţiu 54' (yellow card) 36'; Vingan Alex Ștefan (yellow card) 31'	Stadium: Obor; Referee: Victor Fătu

29 July 2026	Gloria Băneasa	1–3	Dunărea Călărași	Băneasa
17:30 EEST (UTC+03)	Ion Ştefan Cristian 66'; Matei Almeida Afonso Armindo (yellow card) 17'; Petre Mihail Radu (yellow card) 94'		Vîlea Răzvan Andrei 15', 37' (yellow card) 34'; Băceanu Robert Gabriel 21'; Vişan Gabriel Bogdan (yellow card) 31'	Stadium: 1 Mai; Referee: ALEXANDRU IONUȚ MARIN

29 July 2026	Recolta Gheorghe Doja	0–6	Înainte Modelu	Gheorghe Doja
17:30 EEST (UTC+03)	Ene Ionuţ (yellow card) 16'; Anton Costin Daniel (yellow card) 17'; Stan Eric Alexandru (yellow card) 29'		Chiriță Laurențiu Cristian 13', 50'; Gheorghe Daniel-Chirea 75', 82'; Marincea Mario Raul 87'; Mateiu Mario 93'; Lupaşcu Robert Gabriel (yellow card) 22'; Petre Mario Ionuţ (yellow card) 26'; Preda Yanis Nicolae (yellow card) 85'	Stadium: Comunal; Referee: George-Dan Moșoiu

29 July 2026	USV Iași	1–0	Știința Miroslava	Iași
17:30 EEST (UTC+03)	Marin Alexandru Gelu 54'; Pintilei Andrei (yellow card) 37'; Asofiei Mihai (yellow card) 70'		Ţimbalariu Marian Dumitru (yellow card) 87'	Stadium: Emil Alexandrescu; Referee: Bogdan-Mihai Florea

29 July 2026	Petrolul Berca	5–2	Teleajenul Vălenii de Munte	Berca
17:30 EEST (UTC+03)	Lungoci Valentin Mihai 12'; Farcaş Teodor Ştefan 43'; Iacob Alin Cosmin 56'; Koko Dedan Ejieroghene 85'; Paraschiv Cristian 90+2'; Voicu Dragoş Ionuţ (yellow card) 70'		Guiu Andrei Sebastian 36'; Ţînţaru Nicolae Narcis 88'	Stadium: Petrolul; Referee: Adrian Ilie

29 July 2026	Corona Brașov	1–1 (a.e.t.) (4–3 p)	ARO Muscelul Câmpulung	Brașov
17:30 EEST (UTC+03)	Roşu Nicolae Bogdan 89' (yellow card) 9'; Voicu Adrian (yellow card) 24' (yellow-red card) 37'; Vasile Dan Ioan (yellow card) 115'		Seto Takayuki 5'; Iordache Mario (yellow card) 10'; Bledea Davide Gabriel (yellow card) 23'; Mitrache Constantin Daniel (yellow card) 115'	Stadium: Carpați; Referee: Robert Fratila

29 July 2026	Hidro Mecanica Șugag	0–10	Metalurgistul Cugir	Șugag
17:30 EEST (UTC+03)			Minteuan Bogdan Alin 15', 33', 86'; Şaucă Tudor Ioan 40'; Pahone Philip Maximus 45' (yellow card) 23'; Cocan Cristian Andrei 58'; Goronea Dorin George 65'; Iosif Andrei Vlad 70'; Todoran Dorian Andrei 81' (yellow card) 73'; Cristea Gabriel Daniel 83'; Mâlnă George Ştefan (yellow card) 57'	Stadium: Hidro Mecanica; Referee: Paul narcis ionut Bodocan

29 July 2026	Victoria Traian	0–7	Unirea Braniștea	Lacu Sărat
17:30 EEST (UTC+03)			Dragomir Robert Andrei 7'; Cireş Denis 8', 57'; Grădinaru Mădălin Ovidiu 27', 32', 64'; Mocanu Darius George 78'	Stadium: Baza Sportivă Chiscani; Referee: Ionut-Catalin Nanu

29 July 2026	Aerostar Bacău	3–1 (a.e.t.)	Vaslui	Buhuși
17:30 EEST (UTC+03)	Pantelei Denis Patrick 83'; Prenţu Marian 107' (yellow card) 73'; David Victor 120+3' (yellow card) 120'; Negrea Vlăduţ (yellow card) 115'		Tănasă Matei Adrian 38' (yellow card) 87'; Grigore Dragoş (yellow card) 13' (red card) 110'; Munteanu Rareş Gabriel (yellow card) 68'; Sonea Cristian (yellow card) 106'	Stadium: Orășenesc; Referee: Andrei Apreutesei

29 July 2026	Oltul Curtișoara	0–0 (a.e.t.) (4–2 p)	Academica Balș	Curtișoara
17:30 EEST (UTC+03)	Jianu Marius Dumitru 120'; Enache Beniamin 120'; Vîlcică Viorel Constantin 120'; Niţă Romeo Adrian 120'; Tudorașcu George Mihail (yellow card) 21'; Şofaru Marius Cristian (yellow card) 41'; Todosî Ștefan (yellow card) 83'; Băjan Robert Adrian (yellow card) 102'		Şerban Marian Cristinel 120'; Alexa Ionuţ Florentin 120' (yellow card) 51'; Andrei Matei (yellow card) 62'; Burlacu Alexandru Cristian (yellow card) 87'	Stadium: Tineretului; Referee: Alexandru Ionut Calinescu

29 July 2026	FCU 1948 Craiova	0–5	Filiași	Craiova
17:30 EEST (UTC+03)			Rogoveanu Dumitru Daniel 42'; Neaţă Mirel Ionuţ 51'; Buşe Bogdan Ioan 58', 90+2'; Balaci Mihăiţă Mario 82'	Stadium: Tărâmul Leilor; Referee: Gavril Darius Boldu

29 July 2026	Chieșd	1–4	Sighetu Marmației	Chieșd
17:30 EEST (UTC+03)	Pavel Ciprian Emanuel 2' (yellow card) 31'; Gomboș Alin Gabriel (yellow card) 24'; Lingurar Paul Sergiu (yellow card) 81'		Mihalcea Vlad Dumitru 19'; Oltean Alex Gabriel 30', 34'; Coza Paul Cristian 88'	Stadium: Bază sportiva Chieșd; Referee: Raul Chiorean

29 July 2026	Bradul Putna	9–0	Bucovina Rădăuți	Putna
17:30 EEST (UTC+03)	Savin Alexandru Mihai 7', 15'; Bulină Dascălu Luca 29'; Ungurianu Ionel Radu 37'; Zaharia Emanuel Antonio 42'; Anton Ioan Alexandru 54'; Mihalciuc Ştefan Luigi 63'; Coroamă Cătălin Cosmin 88'; Stoian Ionel 90'			Stadium: Local; Referee: Viorel-Mihai Haivas

29 July 2026	Râmnicu Sărat	0–3	Adjud 1946	Râmnicu Sărat
17:30 EEST (UTC+03)	Ionescu-Racoviţeanu Claudiu (yellow card) 48'		Amaechi Christopher 21'; Adeniji Kolade Samson 31'; Maeschi Rareş Ionuţ 66'	Stadium: Municipal; Referee: Paul Manu

29 July 2026	Caransebeș	2–1	Ghiroda	Caransebeș
17:30 EEST (UTC+03)	Musteţa Marian 13'; Neagu Ioan Adrian 90+6'; Todor Florin (yellow card) 19'; Radak Miroslav (yellow card) 35'		Trandu Răzvan 45+1' (yellow card) 90+7'; Roşu David Cristian (yellow card) 61'	Stadium: Balta Sărată; Referee: David Adrian Nicodin

29 July 2026	Bihorul Beiuș	0–1	Lotus Băile Felix	Beiuș
17:30 EEST (UTC+03)	Ntchinda Kom Cahill (yellow card) 45' (yellow-red card) 65'		Meşter Ovidiu Cosmin 52'	Stadium: Francisc Matei; Referee: Eniko Biro

29 July 2026	Crișul Sântandrei	2–1	Unirea Tășnad	Sântandrei
17:30 EEST (UTC+03)	Popescu Gheorghe Robert 46'; Bodog Matei Elias 57'; Gitye Gelu Adrian (yellow card) 62'		Sălăjan Ionuț Adrian 10' (yellow card) 3'; Funkenhauzer Ştefan Chriss (yellow card) 55'	Stadium: Crișul; Referee: Catalin Flonta

29 July 2026	Inter Sibiu	0–2	Mediaș	Sibiu
17:30 EEST (UTC+03)	Fălămaş Doru George (yellow card) 73'		Hăjmăşan Raul Andrei 15'; Streinu Andrei Valentin 35'	Stadium: Baza Sportivă Obor; Referee: Radu Iosif Scrob

29 July 2026	Progresul Mogoșoaia	3–0	Inter Ilfov	Buftea
17:30 EEST (UTC+03)	Gheorghe Cristian 68', 83'; Micu Mario Ştefan 73'; Mavrodin Claudiu Petre (yellow card) 77'		Lazăr Tudor Vlad Gabriel (yellow card) 65'	Stadium: CNAF Buftea; Referee: Stefano Andrei Mihai

29 July 2026	Păulești	6–2	Blejoi	Păulești
17:30 EEST (UTC+03)	Dumitru Marius Nicolae 31'; Păun Andrei Alexandru 38', 85' (yellow card) 53'; Levy Niv 39'; Dan Darius Emil 59'; Comnoiu Cătălin Mihai 70'		Iliescu Rareş Mihai 5'; Dima Bogdan-Ionuţ 7'; Barbu Rareş Mihai (yellow card) 65'	Stadium: Comunal; Referee: Cristian Bulibasa

29 July 2026	Agigea	2–3	Axiopolis Cernavodă	Agigea
17:30 EEST (UTC+03)	Dămăşaru George 29'; Căpitanu Filip 83'		Ursache Robert Florin 2'; Neicu Marius Vasi 45', 72'; Trofimov Alexandru Paul (yellow card) 39'	Stadium: Central; Referee: Cătălin Ionuţ Constantinescu

29 July 2026	Gheorgheni	1–0	Odorheiu Secuiesc	Gheorgheni
17:30 EEST (UTC+03)	Ţepeş-Bobu Andrei-Florin 65'; Bontaş Kristóf (yellow card) 34'; Csiki Tamas (yellow card) 93'		Csiszer Balázs (yellow card) 72'	Stadium: Municipal; Referee: Claudiu ioan Stef

29 July 2026	Săcele	2–2 (a.e.t.) (4–3 p)	Kids Tâmpa Brașov	Săcele
17:30 EEST (UTC+03)	Dumitrovici Raul Valentin 64'; Marin Rareş Andrei (yellow card) 76'; Maftei Rareş Mihai (yellow card) 81'; Ciocâlteu Alexandru Cristian (yellow card) 90+5'; Dinka Levente Andrei (yellow card) 108'		Constantinescu Cristian Nicolae 35'; Zota Răzvan Cristian (yellow card) 73'; Chiper Călin (yellow card) 90+4'; Stoian Adrian George (yellow card) 119'; Saulea Alexandru (yellow card) 119'	Stadium: Electro-Precizia; Referee: Andreea Vlădulescu

29 July 2026	Bolintin-Vale	3–2	AXI Arena	Bolintin-Vale
17:30 EEST (UTC+03)	Ene Mihai Cosmin 25'; Vărzaru Andrei Laurențiu 52'; Constantin Cristian Alexandru 64'		Cornicioiu Albert Iulian 4', 45'; State Vlad Ştefan (red card) 86'	Stadium: Sintetic; Referee: Stefanita Danila

29 July 2026	CSU Alba Iulia	3–4	CIL Blaj	Micești
17:30 EEST (UTC+03)	Stănilă Darius Gabriel 33'; Pop Bogdan 45+1'; Velțan Cătălin 69'; Rusu Andrei Dorin (yellow card) 81'		Blănaru Miluţă Ştefan 40'; Gâţan Răzvan Andrei 74' (yellow card) 44'; Băican Alex Daniel 81'; Pîntea Andrei Răzvan 83'; Tineiu Cătălin Ştefan (yellow card) 75'	Stadium: Groapa Rotundă; Referee: Pavel Adrian Horvat

29 July 2026	Progresul Spartac București	2–0	Progresul Fundulea	Bucharest
17:30 EEST (UTC+03)	Tong Nicolas Andy 71'; Preda Antonio Andrei 90+5' (yellow card) 63'; Ohaci Andrei Gabriel (yellow card) 24'; Beşca Darius Cătălin (yellow card) 36'; Stanciu Rareş Ioan (yellow card) 69'		Lupescu Dragoş Ştefan Jr. (yellow card) 10'; Ion Marian Alexandru (yellow card) 45+2'	Stadium: Progresul Spartac; Referee: Alexandra-Ecaterina Ogică

29 July 2026	Dunărea Giurgiu	3–0	Alexandria	Giurgiu
17:30 EEST (UTC+03)	Mănăilă Sorin 21'; Iosofache Alexandru Antonio 37'; Mizdrescu Răzvan Gabriel 50'		Radu Marius George (yellow card) 36'; Cristea Marian Adrian (yellow card) 56'	Stadium: Marin Anastasovici; Referee: Mitel Marinel Tudor

29 July 2026	Domnești	3–2 (a.e.t.)	Unirea Bascov	Domnești
17:30 EEST (UTC+03)	Sumedrea Ion Emanuel 28'; Jenaru Gabriel Marian 42'; Pătrănoiu Marius Andrei 91' (yellow card) 10'; Mormolea Georgian Nicolae (yellow card) 84'; Achim Florin Mihăiţă (yellow card) 111'		Teodorescu Ionuţ Cătălin 5'; Georgescu Eduard Ionuţ 26'; Puică Dorin Gabriel (yellow card) 49' (yellow-red card) 118'; Ionică Mihnea Octavian (yellow card) 88'; Mircea Adelin Gabriel (yellow card) 107'	Stadium: Comunal; Referee: Dragoș Andrei Pîrîu

29 July 2026	Pucioasa	1–0	Tricolorul Breaza	Pucioasa
17:30 EEST (UTC+03)	Petolea Augustin Gabriel 86'; Pîrva Victor Constantin (yellow card) 90+2'		Neacșu Dorian Costin (yellow card) 26'; Ştefan Alexandru Ionuţ (yellow card) 45'; Dogaru Rareş Ştefan (yellow card) 90+2'	Stadium: Dumitru Tică Popescu; Referee: Adrian Diaconu

29 July 2026	Unirea DMO	0–4	Jiul Petroșani	Hațeg
17:30 EEST (UTC+03)			Fulga Gabriel Mirel 12'; Buţurcă Vlăduţ Vasile 25'; Hondorocu Mathias Andrei 62'; Viaşu Andrei Dumitru 78'	Stadium: Retezatul; Referee: Costin Alexandru Marinoiu

29 July 2026	Gilortul Târgu Cărbunești	1–2 (a.e.t.)	Păușești-Otăsău	Târgu Cărbunești
17:30 EEST (UTC+03)	Avrămescu Alexandru 24'; Brujan Rareș Mihai (yellow card) 40'		Lăzărescu Ionuţ Bogdan 82' (yellow card) 76'; Iordache Florin Daniel 95'; Duca Nonis Florian (yellow card) 41'; Ciortan Vlad Nicolae (yellow card) 64'	Stadium: Cristinel Răducan; Referee: Robert Marian Dumitru

29 July 2026	Unirea Sântana	4–0	Viitorul Arad	Sântana
17:30 EEST (UTC+03)	Burcă Darius Sebastian 4'; Jinga Sorinel Emanuel 44'; Rus Ciprian 78'; Haloş Andrei Alexandru 90+2'			Stadium: Unirea; Referee: Marin Cîrciumaru

=== Second round ===
All matches were played on August 5. Corona Brașov was the only qualifiers team to make it past this round.

5 August 2026	CIL Blaj	2–1 (a.e.t.)	Mediaș	Blaj
17:30 EEST (UTC+03)	Blănaru Miluţă Ştefan 33'; Macarie Ioan Mihai 96' (yellow card) 100'; Jica Bogdan Cristian (yellow card) 51'; Tineiu Cătălin Ştefan (yellow card) 54'; Lungar Nicolae Alexandru (yellow card) 70'; Fleșer Gabriel Iulius (yellow card) 80'; Crivac Alexandru Mihail (yellow card) 90'		Neagu Eduard Raul 4'; Luca Sergiu Constantin (yellow card) 9' (yellow-red card) 95'; Maxim Cristian (yellow card) 70'; Avram Eduard Cristian (yellow card) 84'	Stadium: CIL Veza; Referee: Matei Şerban

5 August 2026	Viitorul Cluj	1–6	Zalău	Cluj-Napoca
17:30 EEST (UTC+03)	Buhari Muhammadu Bello 30'; Mărincaş Damian (yellow card) 22'		Neag Ispas Răzvan 9', 66' (yellow card) 25'; Danale Vlad Andrei 44'; Costea Vlad Adrian 49'; Emeriau Remi Marie Jean Dominique Andre 59'; Jula Andrei Lucian 87'; Kouadio Jean Marc (yellow card) 51'	Stadium: Baza Sportivă Dan Anca; Referee: Raul Chiorean

5 August 2026	Timișul Șag	3–2	Unirea Sântana	Șag
17:30 EEST (UTC+03)	Boariu Denis Mircea 22'; Olaru Andrei Robert 40', 49'; Sturzu Mădălin Florin (yellow card) 43'; Rancov Paul Andrei (yellow card) 65'		Giosu Denis Valentin 19'; Burcă Darius Sebastian 38'; Paşca Adelin Petrişor (yellow card) 48'	Stadium: Comunal; Referee: Robert Fratila

5 August 2026	Bolintin-Vale	1–3 (a.e.t.)	Progresul Spartac București	Bolintin-Vale
17:30 EEST (UTC+03)	Popescu Ciprian Bogdan 39'; Butoi Mihai Valentin (yellow card) 45+3'; Tudor Ștefănel Nicușor (yellow card) 64'; Neacşu Ionuţ Alexandru (yellow card) 110'; Constantin Cristian Alexandru (yellow card) 112' (yellow-red card) 119'; Filip Emanuel Valeriu (yellow card) 113'		Dumitrescu Darius Andrei 28'; Belibrov Robert Mihai 106'; Mirea Rareş Gabriel 114'; Istrate Vlad Petru (yellow card) 94' (red card) 94'	Stadium: Sintetic; Referee: Eduard-Alexandru Belega

5 August 2026	Dunărea Giurgiu	2–1	Cetatea Turnu Măgurele	Giurgiu
17:30 EEST (UTC+03)	Constantin George Tony 53'; Mizdrescu Răzvan Gabriel 64' (yellow card) 48'		Tănase Bogdan 16'; Pălii Dragoş Ionuţ (yellow card) 48'; Stancu Vlăduţ Gabriel (yellow card) 67'	Stadium: Marin Anastasovici; Referee: Ionut Catalin Ilie

5 August 2026	Progresul Mogoșoaia	3–0	Voința Crevedia	Buftea
17:30 EEST (UTC+03)	Barfă Robert Cristian 30'; Răducanu Dumitru Robert 77'; Godin Liviu Silviu 89'		Reghecampf Laurențiu Adrian (yellow card) 3'; Răstuf Mihai Lucian (yellow card) 60'; Curea Denis Ionuţ (yellow card) 75'	Stadium: CNAF Buftea; Referee: Mihail Pandelea

5 August 2026	Dunărea Călărași	2–0	Înainte Modelu	Călărași
17:30 EEST (UTC+03)	Micu David Adrian 9' (yellow card) 64'; Pleşa Claudiu Cristian 85'; Cornei Raul Florin (yellow card) 36'; Vişan Gabriel Bogdan (yellow card) 60'; Gheorghe Marco Alexandru (yellow card) 88'; Vîlea Răzvan Andrei (yellow card) 90+2'		Gheorghe Daniel-Chirea (yellow card) 45'; Marincea Mario Raul (yellow card) 65'; Mateiu Mario (yellow card) 90+3'	Stadium: Ion Comșa; Referee: Robert Postelnicu

5 August 2026	Petrolul Berca	2–3	Băicoi	Berca
17:30 EEST (UTC+03)	Murgoci Lucian 4'; Iacob Alin Cosmin 35'; Lungoci Valentin Mihai (yellow card) 53'; Oancea David (yellow card) 75'		Lazăr Beniamin Cristian 39'; Dumitraşcu Constantin Gabriel 60'; Ghinea Ştefan Mădălin 85'; Brăilă David Mihăiţă (yellow card) 28'; Stan Sorin Gabriel (yellow card) 89'; Matei Eugen Georgian (yellow card) 89'; Marc Ovidiu Andrei (yellow card) 90+2'	Stadium: Petrolul; Referee: Dragoș-Ionuț Balan

5 August 2026	Bradul Putna	1–2	USV Iași	Putna
17:30 EEST (UTC+03)	Zaharia Emanuel Antonio 54' (yellow card) 74'; Stoian Ionel (yellow card) 77'; Mihalciuc Ştefan Luigi (yellow card) 93'		Marin Alexandru Gelu 79'; Albert Grad Vlăduț Răzvan 91'; Asofiei Mihai (yellow card) 28'	Stadium: Local; Referee: Florin Catalin Serian

5 August 2026	Unirea Braniștea	2–4	Sporting Liești	Braniștea
17:30 EEST (UTC+03)	Fadei Andrei Albert 58' (yellow card) 32'; Moroianu Marius 72' (yellow card) 86'; Mocanu Darius George 91'; Aron Robert Ionuț (yellow card) 46'; Nwoye Prince Arinzechukwu (yellow card) 62'; Sava Ştefăniţă Alin (yellow card) 78'		Voinea Petrișor 20'; Năstase Tudor Laurenţiu 47'; Costin Denis Andrei 60' (yellow card) 60'; Podaşcă Ştefan (yellow card) 36'	Stadium: Comunal; Referee: Gheorghe-Cătălin Drugea

5 August 2026	Pucioasa	0–7	Flacăra Moreni	Pucioasa
17:30 EEST (UTC+03)			Lițoiu Ionuț Cristian 9'; Simion Radu Marian 34'; Dogănoiu Ionatan Benjamin 44'; Terec Adrian Andrei 50'; Petre Florin Alexandru 72', 82'; Dina Octavian Andrei 76'; Chiriac Alexandru Florin (yellow card) 29'	Stadium: Dumitru Tică Popescu; Referee: Alexandru-Patru Stoica

5 August 2026	Corona Brașov	3–0	Săcele	Brașov
17:30 EEST (UTC+03)	Rusu Gheorghe Bogdan 10', 26'; Lascu Andrei Marian 55'		Dumitrovici Raul Valentin (yellow card) 71'	Stadium: Carpați; Referee: Csaba Papp

5 August 2026	Sighetu Marmației	1–3	Minaur Baia Mare	Sighetu Marmației
17:30 EEST (UTC+03)	Mărieş Răzvan Octavian 58' (yellow card) 22'; Cacior Radu Ştefan (yellow card) 25'; Santiago Jesús Brian (yellow card) 38'; Yusuf Basit Abiodun (yellow card) 78'		Mureşan Darius Radu 18'; Buziuc Alexandru Daniel 31'; Mercioiu Paul Marcel 81'; Radu Sebastian Ioan (yellow card) 12'	Stadium: Municipal; Referee: Krisztina Szabó

5 August 2026	Gheorgheni	5–0	Ceahlăul Piatra Neamț	Gheorgheni
17:30 EEST (UTC+03)	László Norbert 4', 24'; Sütő Zalán 17'; Gergely Botond 39'; Csiki Tamas 53'		State Ştefan Alessio (yellow card) 16'	Stadium: Municipal; Referee: Jozsef Szakacs

5 August 2026	Domnești	2–7	Olimpic Zărnești	Domnești
17:30 EEST (UTC+03)	Pătrănoiu Marius Andrei 27'; Jenaru Gabriel Marian 65'; Naciu Bogdan Georgică (yellow card) 43'; Achim Florin Mihăiţă (yellow card) 61'		Marinescu Ioan Bogdan 3', 24', 90+2'; Ilie Horia Cătălin 13', 88', 90+4' (yellow card) 43'; Ilie Alexandru Mihai 71'; Dobre Gabriel Alin (yellow card) 50'; Țintea Alexandru Constantin (yellow card) 55'	Stadium: Comunal; Referee: Mihail Denis Boldu

5 August 2026	Sănătatea Cluj	2–2 (a.e.t.) (5–4 p)	Unirea Alba Iulia	Cluj-Napoca
17:30 EEST (UTC+03)	Sanusi Hussaini 45+2'; Negru Emanuel Rareş 83'; Milchiş Denis Alexandru (yellow card) 118'		Niakate Abdoulaye 52'; Dumitru Antonio Mihai 79'; Ayeni Victor Oluwadare (yellow card) 119'	Stadium: Clujana; Referee: Leopold Herczeg

5 August 2026	Axiopolis Cernavodă	1–3	Agricola Borcea	Cernavodă
17:30 EEST (UTC+03)	Tudoran George Mădălin 34' (yellow card) 8'; Jidovu Nayati (yellow card) 89'		Ghinga Sebastian-Marinel 39'; Toarcaş Athanasios 45+2'; Vasilescu Andrei Mihai 90+4'; Ispas Denis Florentin (yellow card) 78'; Ghizdeanu Robert Andrei (yellow card) 85'	Stadium: Trust; Referee: Sebastian Cojocaru

5 August 2026	Filiași	3–3 (a.e.t.) (4–5 p)	Oltul Curtișoara	Filiași
17:30 EEST (UTC+03)	Calu Cosmin Daniel 11' (yellow card) 96'; Petre Robert Constantin 44'; Buşe Bogdan Ioan 65' (yellow card) 97'; Purcaru Alexandru Nicolas (yellow card) 102'; Raicea Alexandru Nicuşor (yellow card) 47'		Todosî Ștefan 46'; Şerban Mihăiţă Eugen 57'; Tudorașcu Radu Gabriel 87' (yellow card) 89'; Jianu Marius Dumitru (yellow card) 111'	Stadium: Orășenesc; Referee: Mihail-Sebastian Lăstun

5 August 2026	Adjud 1946	2–1 (a.e.t.)	KSE Târgu Secuiesc	Adjud
17:30 EEST (UTC+03)	Lupu Lorian Andrei 85'; Săpunaru Sorin Petruţ 119' (yellow card) 92'; Ungurenaşu Dragoş Adrian (yellow card) 72'		Nicoloiu Andrei Daniel 82'; Varga Máté Hunor (yellow card) 117'	Stadium: Municipal; Referee: Lucian Diaconu

5 August 2026	Aerostar Bacău	0–1	Viitorul Onești	Buhuși
17:30 EEST (UTC+03)	Ganea Mario Florin (yellow card) 50'		Românescu Cristian 73' (yellow card) 90+4'; Popa Roberto Ștefănuț (yellow card) 60'; Ghimbăşan Vlad (yellow card) 71'	Stadium: Orășenesc; Referee: Daniel Pătrunsu

5 August 2026	Păulești	0–3	Tunari	Păulești
17:30 EEST (UTC+03)	Preda Leonard Georgian (red card) 18'		Bălan Adrian Ionuţ 9', 81'; Ion Nicolae Lucian 90+1'	Stadium: Comunal; Referee: Dumitru Robert Mormeci

5 August 2026	Metalurgistul Cugir	0–1	Jiul Petroșani	Cugir
17:30 EEST (UTC+03)	Cocan Cristian Andrei (yellow card) 21'; Liubashov Ihor (yellow card) 61'; Butnariu Mihai Adrian (yellow card) 75'		Trip Fabio Andrei 55'; Popa Dragoș Iulian (yellow card) 90+1'	Stadium: Arena; Referee: Alexandru Nicolae Şuvar

5 August 2026	Păușești-Otăsău	0–2	Târgu Jiu	Pietrari
17:30 EEST (UTC+03)	Lăzărescu Ionuţ Bogdan (yellow card) 52'		Șantia Florin Cristian 32', 57'; Lăpădat Alexandru Ștefan (yellow card) 22'	Stadium: Comunal; Referee: Claudiu Andrei Filip

5 August 2026	Lotus Băile Felix	0–0 (a.e.t.) (3–5 p)	Crișul Sântandrei	Sânmartin
17:30 EEST (UTC+03)	Serediuc Tiberiu Andrei (yellow card) 108'		Göndör Sebastian Ionuţ (yellow card) 38'; Popescu Gheorghe Robert (yellow card) 86'; Haica Valentin Florin Vasile (yellow card) 90+3'	Stadium: Comunal; Referee: Adrian Negrean

5 August 2026	Caransebeș	0–0 (a.e.t.) (4–5 p)	Minerul Lupeni	Caransebeș
17:30 EEST (UTC+03)	Longa Mario Răzvan (yellow card) 67'; Arjocan Denis Andrei (yellow card) 73'; Duţescu Ciprian Cătălin (yellow card) 79'		Yabré (yellow card) 53'; Tiganj Erwin (yellow card) 48'; Creciunesc Alexandru Daniel (yellow card) 59'; Bărbat Eric (yellow card) 41'	Stadium: Balta Sărată; Referee: Alexandru George Manea

=== Third round ===
Number of teams per tier still in competition
Liga I	Liga II	Liga III	Liga IV	Total
16 / 16	22 / 22	26 / 90	0 / 4	64 / 132

12 August 2026	Popești-Leordeni	5–0	Dinamo București	Buftea
11:00 EEST (UTC+03)	Ion Mihai 16', 20', 36'; Taiwo Quadri Olakunle 50'; Boiangiu Leonard Valentin 61'; Duţu Alexandru Ştefan (yellow card) 56'; Căpraru Adrian George (yellow card) 89'		Rus Silviu Andrei (yellow card) 60'	Stadium: CNAF Buftea; Referee: Stefano Andrei Mihai

12 August 2026	Viitorul Onești	0–3	Bacău	Filipeşti
17:30 EEST (UTC+03)			Oasenegre Codrin 12'; Ciobanu Robert Denis 48' (yellow card) 43'; Petre Patrick Mihai 59'	Stadium: Baza sportivă Viitorul Oneşti; Referee: Gellert Feleki

12 August 2026	Băicoi	2–4	Metalul Buzău	Băicoi
17:30 EEST (UTC+03)	Stoica Constantin Adrian 31', 53'; Marc Ovidiu Andrei (yellow card) 37'; Brăilă David Mihăiţă (yellow card) 43'; Dumitraşcu Constantin Gabriel (yellow card) 50'; Lazăr Beniamin Cristian (yellow card) 72'; Bunescu Eduard Ştefan (yellow card) 78'		Moldovan Adrian Sabin 11'; Tudor Saim Alexandru 19'; Robu Valentin Robert 46', 89'; Borţoneanu Claudiu Gabriel (yellow card) 50'; Oprea Dănuţ Dorinel (yellow card) 85'	Stadium: Liliești; Referee: Cătălin Ionuţ Constantinescu

12 August 2026	Flacăra Moreni	1–2	Chindia Târgoviște	Moreni
17:30 EEST (UTC+03)	Dogănoiu Ionatan Benjamin 58'; Petre Florin Alexandru (yellow card) 76'; Simion Radu Marian (yellow card) 77'		Dumitrache Valentin Laurenţiu 38', 90+1'; Estacio Fajardo Francisco (yellow card) 32'; Celea Daniel Marinel (yellow card) 87'	Stadium: Flacăra; Referee: Ion Dănuț Miricioiu

12 August 2026	Gheorgheni	0–2	ASA Târgu Mureș	Gheorgheni
17:30 EEST (UTC+03)	Simó Csongor (yellow card) 22'; Sütő Zalán (yellow card) 60'; Balogh Szilárd (yellow card) 84'		Trif Rareş Bogdan 10', 46'; Vînău Eric Andrei (yellow card) 13'; Horşia Adrian (yellow card) 54'; Achim Cosmin Florin (yellow card) 57'; Galdea Luca Emilian (yellow card) 66'	Stadium: Municipal; Referee: Matei Şerban

12 August 2026	Timișul Șag	1–3	Reșița	Șag
17:30 EEST (UTC+03)	Roşu Fabian Robert 13'; Boariu Denis Mircea (yellow card) 39'		Šavija Stefan 45+1'; Lawal Sulaimon Oluwasegun 50' (yellow card) 28'; Višić Stefan 82'; Buzan Lucian (yellow card) 58'	Stadium: Comunal; Referee: Sorin-Florin Saladea

12 August 2026	CIL Blaj	1–0	Sănătatea Cluj	Blaj
17:30 EEST (UTC+03)	Tineiu Cătălin Ştefan 21'; Pîntea Andrei Răzvan (yellow card) 14'; Roşca Cristian Valentin (yellow card) 19'; Crivac Alexandru Mihail (yellow card) 76'		Milchiş David Cătălin (yellow card) 51'; Dinescu Andrei (yellow card) 78'	Stadium: CIL Veza; Referee: Claudiu Dantes Matiş

12 August 2026	Dunărea Călărași	0–3	Afumaţi	Călărași
17:30 EEST (UTC+03)			Sanogo Mamourou 60'; Kaplan Onur 71'; Zaina Ionuţ Bogdan 87'	Stadium: Ion Comșa; Referee: Liviu Rasteanu

12 August 2026	1599 Șelimbăr	w/o	Hermannstadt	Cisnădie
17:30 EEST (UTC+03)				Stadium: Măgura

12 August 2026	Dunărea Giurgiu	0–3	Steaua București	Giurgiu
17:30 EEST (UTC+03)	Benkhelifa Ismail (yellow card) 23'; Mizdrescu Răzvan Gabriel (yellow card) 39'		Chipirliu 14', 77'; Fontoura Caldieraro Pedro Henrique 32'; Albu Alexandru Cristian (yellow card) 34'; Camara (yellow card) 49'	Stadium: Marin Anastasovici; Referee: Ana Maria Alexandra Terteleac

12 August 2026	Progresul Mogoșoaia	1–4	Concordia Chiajna	Buftea
17:30 EEST (UTC+03)	Saftoiu Florin Gabriel 5'		Chiriţoiu Andreas Cătălin 49'; Carnat Nicolae 51', 75', 90+3'; Munteanu Filip Paul (red card) 37'	Stadium: CNAF Buftea; Referee: Stefanita Danila

12 August 2026	Progresul Spartac București	2–1	Metaloglobus București	Bucharest
17:30 EEST (UTC+03)	Beşca Darius Cătălin 15', 66'; Dumitrescu Darius Andrei (red card) 90+5'		Leonte Costin Valentin 7'; Dumitru Andrei Dan (yellow card) 41'	Stadium: Progresul Spartac; Referee: Theodor Oancea

12 August 2026	Agricola Borcea	1–4	Unirea Slobozia	Borcea
17:30 EEST (UTC+03)	Delciu Cristian 3'; Vasile Roberto Andrei George (yellow card) 17'; Stroe Raffaele Emiliano (yellow card) 29'		Gîrbăcea Viorel Ionuţ 38'; Bobál Gergely 63'; Grădinaru Răzvan Toni Augustin 74'; Ibrian Florinel Valentin 90+3' (yellow card) 90'; Iancu Raul George (yellow card) 11'; Nedelea Gabriel Ionuţ (yellow card) 40'; Toma Constantin Adrian (yellow card) 53'	Stadium: Comunal; Referee: George-Dan Moșoiu

12 August 2026	Zalău	0–1	Gloria Bistrița	Zalău
17:30 EEST (UTC+03)	Sima Nicolae Alexandru (yellow card) 90+2'		King Otega Jimmy 79'; Pîrvulescu Sergiu Mihai (yellow card) 74'	Stadium: Municipal; Referee: Raul Chiorean

12 August 2026	Minaur Baia Mare	5–0	Olimpia Satu Mare	Baia Mare
17:30 EEST (UTC+03)	Buziuc Alexandru Daniel 15', 48'; Stănescu Raphael Andrei 45+2', 68'; Buhai Denis Vasile Marian 88'; Bădici Andy Cristian (yellow card) 23'		Berinde Mateo Daniel (yellow card) 28'; Rebic Raul Rafael (yellow card) 44'; Maxineanu Denis Mihai (yellow card) 73'	Stadium: Viorel Mateianu; Referee: Raul-Oliviu Balaiban

12 August 2026	Oltul Curtișoara	0–3	Slatina	Curtișoara
17:30 EEST (UTC+03)	Ungureanu Dorinel Cosmin (yellow card) 37'		Pacionel Emilian 73'; Solcan Alexandru Stefano 79'; Kouban Mbanga Jean Calvin 90+2'; Stancu Claudiu Constantin (yellow card) 28'; Lăpădătescu Mihai Robert (yellow card) 54'; Sorescu Yanis Andrei (yellow card) 82'	Stadium: Tineretului; Referee: Costin Alexandru Marinoiu

12 August 2026	Jiul Petroșani	0–1	Minerul Lupeni	Petroşani
17:30 EEST (UTC+03)	Fulga Gabriel Mirel (yellow card) 27'; Gogescu Andrei Florian (yellow card) 50'; Sandu Remus Iulian (yellow card) 90+1'		Tiganj Erwin 52'; Offorzor Julius Ifeanyi (yellow card) 3'; Creciunesc Alexandru Daniel (yellow card) 37'; Moumbagna Camal Ryan (yellow card) 45'; Bărbat Eric (yellow card) 78'	Stadium: Baza Sportivă Gigi Mulțescu; Referee: Radu Iosif Scrob

12 August 2026	Corona Brașov	3–1	Olimpic Zărnești	Brașov
17:30 EEST (UTC+03)	Rusu Gheorghe Bogdan 27'; Matsumoto Mario Cezar 69'; Roşu Nicolae Bogdan 84'; Dumbravă Florin Daniel (yellow card) 24'; Barnea Vlad Cosmin (yellow card) 72'; Covalciuc Vadim (yellow card) 90+3'		Ilie Horia Cătălin 13'; Țintea Alexandru Constantin (yellow card) 16'; Alupoaie Diego Marcel (yellow card) 79'	Stadium: Carpați; Referee: Roxana Timis

12 August 2026	USV Iași	1–0	Cetatea Suceava	Iași
17:30 EEST (UTC+03)	Cuculescu Albert Andrei 11'; Grigorescu Matei Ștefan (yellow card) 87'; Călin Erik Mario Emanuel (yellow card) 90+5'		Mihai Andrei Marian (yellow card) 49'; Aftanache Alexandru (yellow card) 90'	Stadium: Emil Alexandrescu; Referee: Cosmin-Constantin Apetrei

12 August 2026	Tunari	2–1	Ștefănești	Tunari
17:30 EEST (UTC+03)	Furtuna Denis 13' (yellow card) 46'; Ion Nicolae Lucian 26'; Ribeiro Souza Pedro Augusto (yellow card) 21'; Bălan Adrian Ionuţ (yellow card) 31'; Moisie Claudiu Constantin (yellow card) 88'		Pătru David Andrei 56'; Ciortan Ionel (yellow card) 23'; Bivolaru Răzvan Andrei (yellow card) 57'; Stavrositu Ştefan (yellow card) 80'; Mălăele Roberto Leonard (yellow card) 86'	Stadium: Central; Referee: Gavril Darius Boldu

12 August 2026	Adjud 1946	2–4	Sporting Liești	Adjud
17:30 EEST (UTC+03)	Predoiu Gabriel Mădălin 85'; Necula Robert Vasilică 90' (yellow card) 90+2'; Pavel Ştefan Cosmin (yellow card) 72' (yellow-red card) 80'		Trandafir Andrei Petrişor 23', 69'; Voinea Petrișor 33'; Iordache Gicu 65'; Podaşcă Ştefan (yellow card) 19' (yellow-red card) 50'; Munchiu Daniel Teodor (yellow card) 46'	Stadium: Municipal; Referee: Mihai-Lucian Moisă

12 August 2026	Politehnica Timișoara	1–0 (a.e.t.)	Dumbrăvița	Timișoara
17:30 EEST (UTC+03)	Chiţu Aurelian Ionuţ 103'; Vlaicu Aurel (yellow card) 29'; Popa David (yellow card) 49'		Pădurariu Cristian Nicu (yellow card) 53'; Mucuţă Dragoş Marian (yellow card) 106'; Cibi Fabiano Duarte (yellow card) 117'	Stadium: Electrica; Referee: Raul George Cupu

12 August 2026	Crișul Sântandrei	0–3	Bihor Oradea	Sântandrei
17:30 EEST (UTC+03)	Kovacs Márk 93'; Rusu Denis Alex (yellow card) 65'		Cruceru Antonio Ovidiu 23'; Hora Ioan 66'; Şerban Sorin Dănuţ (yellow card) 37'; Călin Tudor Dorin (yellow card) 64'	Stadium: Crișul; Referee: Robert Fratila

12 August 2026	Târgu Jiu	0–0 (a.e.t.) (3–4 p)	Râmnicu Vâlcea	Târgu Jiu
20:00 EEST (UTC+03)	Bărănescu Fabian Octavian (yellow card) 96'; Brăşfăleanu Florin Bogdan (yellow card) 26'; Dumbrăvean Flavius (yellow card) 74'; Brînzan Gigi Denis (yellow card) 90+3'		Georgescu Vladimir Andrei (yellow card) 63'; Uleia Ionuţ Alexandru (yellow card) 43'	Stadium: Municipal; Referee: Dan-Stefan Buzarnescu

=== Play-off round ===
The draw for the play-off round was held on 13 August 2026. The 32 participating teams were divided into two pots. Pot A consisted of eight teams, while Pot B consisted of the 24 winners from the third round.

The matches will be played between 18 and 20 August 2026.

==== Seeding ====
In this round, 8 seeded teams will face off against 8 of the 24 unseeded teams, while the remaining 16 unseeded teams will compete against each other.

Seeded	Unseeded		
Oțelul Galați; Botoșani; Csíkszereda Miercurea Ciuc; Petrolul Ploiești; Farul Constanța; Corvinul Hunedoara; Sepsi Sfântu Gheorghe; Voluntari	Popești-Leordeni; Bacău; Metalul Buzău; Chindia Târgoviște; ASA Târgu Mureș; Reșița; Afumaţi; Steaua București	Concordia Chiajna; Unirea Slobozia; Gloria Bistrița; Slatina; Politehnica Timișoara; Bihor Oradea; Râmnicu Vâlcea; 1599 Șelimbăr	CIL Blaj; Progresul Spartac București; Minaur Baia Mare; Minerul Lupeni; Corona Brașov; USV Iași; Tunari; Sporting Liești

=== Matches ===
Number of teams per tier still in competition
Liga I	Liga II	Liga III	Liga IV	Total
16 / 16	16 / 22	8 / 90	0 / 4	40 / 132

18 August 2026	Reșița (2)	2–3 (a.e.t.)	Petrolul Ploiești (1)	Reşiţa
17:30 EEST (UTC+03)	Višić Stefan 48'; Chira Cristian Octavian Mihai 88'; Salhi M'hammed Ouadie (yellow card) 22'; Zavnik Matic (yellow card) 30'; Bloj Erwin Szilard (yellow card) 112'		Vega Albornoz Luciano Gastón 31' (yellow card) 104'; Paraschiv David Ionuţ 44'; Tolea Ioan Cătălin 110'; Căpuşă Tiberiu Ionuţ (yellow card) 41'; Hüseynov Jalal (yellow card) 85'; Zaian Adam Mahmoud Paul (yellow card) 92'; Nlundulu Konda Dan (yellow card) 114'	Stadium: Mircea Chivu; Referee: Marius Daniel Bădoiu

18 August 2026	Râmnicu Vâlcea (2)	1–1 (a.e.t.) (4–5 p)	Chindia Târgoviște (2)	Râmnicu Vâlcea
17:30 EEST (UTC+03)	Grigore Darius Alexandru 50'; Constantin Vasile Nicolae (yellow card) 39'; Butișteanu Daniel Teodor (yellow card) 51'; Nistor Eric Mihai (yellow card) 64'; Florescu Bogdan Gabriel (yellow card) 73'; Traşcu Andrei Silvian (yellow card) 95'; Georgescu Vladimir Andrei (yellow card) 100'		Mihai Rareş Ionuţ 18'; Honciu Georgian (yellow card) 103'; Celea Daniel Marinel (yellow card) 80'; Estacio Fajardo Francisco (yellow card) 90'	Stadium: Municipal; Referee: Raul George Cupu

19 August 2026	Gloria Bistrița (2)	0–0 (a.e.t.) (4–1 p)	Metalul Buzău (2)	Bistrița
17:30 EEST (UTC+03)	Asibey Emmanuel Osei (yellow card) 115'; King Otega Jimmy (yellow card) 108'		Tudor Saim Alexandru (yellow card) 71'; Baxevanos Nikolaos (yellow card) 98'; Oprea Dănuţ Dorinel (yellow card) 120'	Stadium: Jean Pădureanu; Referee: Constantin Alin Olaru

19 August 2026	Minaur Baia Mare (3)	2–3	Corvinul Hunedoara (1)	Baia Mare
17:30 EEST (UTC+03)	Şteau Raul Ovidiu 7'; Ciubăncan David Bogdan 79'; Mureşan Darius Radu (yellow card) 50'; Krausz Raul Zoran (yellow card) 74'; Radu Sebastian Ioan (yellow card) 86'; Chinde Viorel Vasile (yellow card) 88'; Fărcăşan Vlad Cristian (yellow card) 90+3'		Bratu George Mario 26', 41', 67'; Deaconu Ronaldo Octavian Andrei (yellow card) 31'; Abualnadi Mohammad Majed (yellow card) 42'; Neacşa Ionuţ Alexandru (yellow card) 65'	Stadium: Viorel Mateianu; Referee: Darius Iviniș

19 August 2026	Bihor Oradea (2)	1–0	Farul Constanța (1)	Oradea
17:30 EEST (UTC+03)	Modan Nicu Ionel 13'; Antoche Marius Paul (yellow card) 90+1'		Alibec Denis (yellow card) 67'	Stadium: Iuliu Bodola; Referee: Dragos Nicolae Lunca

19 August 2026	Popești-Leordeni (2)	0–3	Bacău (2)	Clinceni
17:30 EEST (UTC+03)	Damaşcan Eric Andrei (yellow card) 35'		Mitrică Paul Răzvan 11' (yellow card) 30'; Oasenegre Codrin 65', 75'	Stadium: Clinceni; Referee: Alina Pesu

19 August 2026	Minerul Lupeni (3)	1–0	Unirea Slobozia (2)	Lupeni
17:30 EEST (UTC+03)	Tiganj Erwin 90+3' (yellow card) 90+1' (yellow-red card) 90+3'; Popa Vlăduţ Cristian (yellow card) 42'; Bărbat Eric (yellow card) 42'; Yabré Tobasegnou François (yellow card) 44'; Creciunesc Alexandru Daniel (yellow card) 48'		Lazăr Rareş Ştefănuţ (yellow card) 23'; Lazăr Gabriel (yellow card) 32'; Todoran David Cristian (yellow card) 42'; Freitas Borges Felipe Miguel (yellow card) 84'	Stadium: Minerul; Referee: Costin Alexandru Marinoiu

19 August 2026	USV Iași (3)	1–2 (a.e.t.)	Sporting Liești (3)	Iași
17:30 EEST (UTC+03)	Marin Alexandru Gelu 16'; Sîrbu Ștefan Florin (yellow card) 90+2'; Pintilei Andrei (yellow card) 101'		Voinea Petrișor 64'; Crihană Bogdan Alexandru 105+1' (yellow card) 74'; Trandafir Andrei Petrişor (yellow card) 23'; Iordache Gicu (yellow card) 59'; Popa Paul Valentin (yellow card) 108'	Stadium: Emil Alexandrescu; Referee: Dragoş Ionuţ Ţurcanu

19 August 2026	CIL Blaj (3)	1–3 (a.e.t.)	Progresul Spartac București (3)	Blaj
17:30 EEST (UTC+03)	Jica Bogdan Cristian 43'; Bran Sebastian (yellow card) 91'; Băican Alex Daniel (yellow card) 109'; Blănaru Miluţă Ştefan (yellow card) 114'; Păduraru George Adrian (yellow card) 115'; Vodă Alexandru Ionuţ (yellow card) 116' (red card) 116'		Stanciu Ciprian Georgian 31'; Beşca Darius Cătălin 104'; Marinescu Petre 120+3'; Mirea Rareş Gabriel (yellow card) 41'; Cazacu Tiberiu Emilian (yellow card) 72' (yellow-red card) 110'	Stadium: CIL Veza; Referee: Nicolae Emil Breoi

19 August 2026	Afumați (2)	0–1	Voluntari (1)	Buftea
17:30 EEST (UTC+03)	Diomande Mohamed Abdoul Junior (yellow card) 54'; McCarthy Charles (yellow card) 86'		Babić Matko 50'; Toma Daniel Marian (yellow card) 67'	Stadium: CNAF Buftea; Referee: Mihail-Sebastian Lăstun

19 August 2026	Slatina (2)	0–2 (a.e.t.)	Sepsi Sfântu Gheorghe (1)	Slatina
17:30 EEST (UTC+03)	Magyari Szilárd (yellow card) 25'; Şerbănică Daniel Marius (yellow card) 34'; Bărăitaru Mario Alexandru (yellow card) 112'		Păun Nicolae Ionuţ 91'; Mawa Moses Dramwi 115'; Rose Lindsay Marc (yellow card) 21'; Cîmpean Raul Daniel (yellow card) 78'	Stadium: 1 Mai; Referee: Raul-Sebastian Bădărău

19 August 2026	Politehnica Timișoara (2)	2–1	ASA Târgu Mureș (2)	Timișoara
17:30 EEST (UTC+03)	Ene Cornel Alexandru 45'; Marincu Fabian Alexandru 49'; Dolghi Mihai (yellow card) 56'; Popa David (yellow card) 71'; Micu Sebastian (yellow card) 76'; Benzar Romario Sandu (yellow card) 77'		Samake Moussa Tiefing 45+4'; Geantă Robert Mihai (yellow card) 42'; Trif Rareş Bogdan (yellow card) 75'	Stadium: Electrica; Referee: Adelin Pavel

19 August 2026	Corona Brașov (3)	3–2	Tunari (3)	Brașov
17:30 EEST (UTC+03)	Rusu Gheorghe Bogdan 16', 71' (yellow card) 11'; Gavrilă Andrei Florin 53' (yellow card) 90+5'; Matsumoto Mario Cezar (yellow card) 25'		Andreaş Patrick 30'; Bălan Adrian Ionuţ 76'; Pîrcălabu Denis Marian (yellow card) 52'; Matei Silvian (yellow card) 73'; Răuţă Andrei (yellow card) 90'; Ribeiro Souza Pedro Augusto (yellow card) 90+5'	Stadium: Carpați; Referee: Gellert Feleki

19 August 2026	Concordia Chiajna (2)	5–1	Oțelul Galați (1)	Chiajna
20:30 EEST (UTC+03)	Sula Din 34'; Gualda Jardon Alexander 44' (yellow card) 42'; Chamorro Florentin Alexis Fabián 63'; Ganea George Dănuţ 80'; Ion Robert Andrei 83'; Bălaşa Mihai Alexandru (yellow card) 77'		Bordun Denis Marian 90'; Frunză Matei (yellow card) 48'; Iacob Paul Alexandru (yellow card) 52'	Stadium: Concordia; Referee: Ioan-Răzvan Negară

20 August 2026	Steaua București (2)	1–2 (a.e.t.)	Csíkszereda Miercurea Ciuc (1)	Bucharest
17:00 EEST (UTC+03)	Chipirliu Remus Bogdan 52'; Ilie Adrian (yellow card) 113'; Adăscăliţei Mihai Andrei (yellow card) 113' (red card) 113'		Trif Răzvan Alin 40'; Szalay Szabolcs 112'; Dolný Jozef (yellow card) 36'; Palmeș Raul Ioan (yellow card) 44'; Horváth Artúr (yellow card) 100'	Stadium: Steaua; Referee: Dorin Alexandru Burloiu

20 August 2026	1599 Șelimbăr (2)	1–3	Botoșani (1)	Cisnădie
17:30 EEST (UTC+03)	Boboc Robert Florin 60' (yellow card) 56'; Kielhorn Benjamin Otto Ioan (yellow card) 90+3'		Gama Da Silva Gabriel 18'; Mitrov Zoran 39'; Marković Jovan 41'; Kovtaliuk Mykola (yellow card) 13'; De Vega Lima Lucas (yellow card) 90+3'	Stadium: Măgura; Referee: Arthur Racoare

== Group stage ==
The draw for the group stage took place on 21 August 2026.

=== Seeding ===
Seeding was determined based on the positions achieved in the previous league season.

Pot 1	Pot 2	Pot 3
CFR Cluj (1); Dinamo București (1); Argeș Pitești (1); FCSB (1); Rapid București (1); Universitatea Cluj (1); Universitatea Craiova (1); UTA Arad (1)	Botoșani (1); Csíkszereda Miercurea Ciuc (1); Petrolul Ploiești (1); Corvinul Hunedoara (1); Sepsi Sfântu Gheorghe (1); Voluntari (1); Bihor Oradea (2); Chindia Târgoviște (2)	Bacău (2); Concordia Chiajna (2); Gloria Bistrița (2); Politehnica Timișoara (2); Sporting Liești (3); Progresul Spartac București (3); Minerul Lupeni (3); Corona Brașov (3)

Number of teams per tier still in competition
Liga I	Liga II	Liga III	Liga IV	Total
14 / 16	6 / 22	4 / 90	0 / 4	24 / 132

=== Group A ===
Pos	Team	Pld	W	D	L	GF	GA	GD	Pts	Qualification	UTA	RAP	COR	BOT	TIM	MIN
1	UTA Arad	1	1	0	0	3	0	+3	3	Advance to knockout phase	—	—	—	28 Oct	—	—
2	Rapid București	1	1	0	0	2	0	+2	3	Advance to knockout phase	2 Dec	—	—	—	—	—
3	Corvinul Hunedoara	1	1	0	0	1	0	+1	3		—	28 Oct	—	—	—	—
4	Botoșani	1	0	0	1	0	1	−1	0		—	—	0–1	—	—	—
5	Politehnica Timișoara	1	0	0	1	0	2	−2	0		—	0–2	2 Dec	—	—	—
6	Minerul Lupeni	1	0	0	1	0	3	−3	0		0–3	—	—	2 Dec	28 Oct	—

Updated to match(es) played on 3 September 2026. Source: Flashscore
Legend: Blue = home team win; Yellow = draw; Red = away team win.
2 September 2026
16:00

Minerul Lupeni	0–3	UTA Arad
	Report	Abdallah 23'; Dorobanțu 34'; Tzionis 76'

Minerul, Lupeni
Referee: Claudiu Andrei Filip
2 September 2026
16:45

Botoșani	0–1	Corvinul Hunedoara
	Report	Yeboah 16' (pen.)

Municipal, Botoșani
Referee: Horia-Gabriel Mladinovici
3 September 2026
20:30

Politehnica Timișoara	0–2	Rapid București
	Report	Kamara 85'; Bubanja 88'

Municipal, Sibiu
Referee: Sorin Vădana

28 October 2026

Corvinul Hunedoara	v	Rapid București

Petre Libardi, Petroșani
28 October 2026

UTA Arad	v	Botoșani

Francisc von Neuman, Arad
28 October 2026

Minerul Lupeni	v	Politehnica Timișoara

Minerul, Lupeni

2 December 2026

Rapid București	v	UTA Arad

Rapid-Giulești, Bucharest
2 December 2026

Politehnica Timișoara	v	Corvinul Hunedoara

Electrica, Timișoara
2 December 2026

Minerul Lupeni	v	Botoșani

Minerul, Lupeni

=== Group B ===
Pos	Team	Pld	W	D	L	GF	GA	GD	Pts	Qualification	CON	CFR	UCL	PET	SEP	PRO
1	Concordia Chiajna	1	1	0	0	5	2	+3	3	Advance to knockout phase	—	2 Dec	—	—	28 Oct	—
2	CFR Cluj	1	1	0	0	3	1	+2	3	Advance to knockout phase	—	—	28 Oct	—	—	—
3	Universitatea Cluj	1	1	0	0	1	0	+1	3		—	—	—	1–0	—	—
4	Petrolul Ploiești	1	0	0	1	0	1	−1	0		—	—	—	—	2 Dec	—
5	Sepsi Sfântu Gheorghe	1	0	0	1	1	3	−2	0		—	1–3	—	—	—	—
6	Progresul Spartac București	1	0	0	1	2	5	−3	0		2–5	—	2 Dec	28 Oct	—	—

Updated to match(es) played on 1 September 2026. Source: Flashscore
Legend: Blue = home team win; Yellow = draw; Red = away team win.
1 September 2026
16:00

Progresul Spartac București	2–5	Concordia Chiajna
Rareș Mirea 38'; Darius Dumitrescu 65'	Report	Carnat 11'; Jipa 25', 33'; R. Ion 73'; Sebastian Banu 84'

Progresul Spartac, Bucharest
Referee: Cristian Vîrgolici
1 September 2026
18:00

Sepsi Sfântu Gheorghe	1–3	CFR Cluj
Davordzie 66'	Report	Păun 8'; Sfait 47'; Korenica 86'

Sepsi Arena, Sfântu Gheorghe
Referee: Iulian Călin
1 September 2026
21:00

Universitatea Cluj	1–0	Petrolul Ploiești
Macalou 73' (pen.)	Report

Cluj Arena, Cluj-Napoca
Referee: Viorel Flueran

28 October 2026

CFR Cluj	1–3	Universitatea Cluj

Dr. Constantin Rădulescu, Cluj-Napoca
28 October 2026

Concordia Chiajna	v	Sepsi Sfântu Gheorghe

Concordia, Chiajna
28 October 2026

Progresul Spartac București	v	Petrolul Ploiești

Progresul Spartac, Bucharest

2 December 2026

Concordia Chiajna	v	CFR Cluj

Concordia, Chiajna
2 December 2026

Progresul Spartac București	v	Universitatea Cluj

Progresul Spartac, Bucharest
2 December 2026

Petrolul Ploiești	v	Sepsi Sfântu Gheorghe

Ilie Oană, Ploiești

=== Group C ===
Pos	Team	Pld	W	D	L	GF	GA	GD	Pts	Qualification	FCS	CSI	BIH	BRA	GLO	ARG
1	FCSB	1	1	0	0	5	0	+5	3	Advance to knockout phase	—	2 Dec	—	—	—	—
2	Csíkszereda Miercurea Ciuc	1	1	0	0	2	0	+2	3	Advance to knockout phase	—	—	28 Oct	—	—	—
3	Bihor Oradea	1	0	1	0	2	2	0	1		—	—	—	—	—	2 Dec
4	Corona Brașov	1	0	1	0	2	2	0	1		—	—	2–2	—	2 Dec	28 Oct
5	Gloria Bistrița	1	0	0	1	0	2	−2	0		28 Oct	0–2	—	—	—	—
6	Argeș Pitești	1	0	0	1	0	5	−5	0		0–5	—	—	—	—	—

Updated to match(es) played on 2 September 2026. Source: Flashscore
Legend: Blue = home team win; Yellow = draw; Red = away team win.
1 September 2026
18:00

Corona Brașov	2–2	Bihor Oradea
Grozav 63'; Mateiu 87'	Report	Boiciuc 8'; Hora 69'

Baza Sportivă Carpați, Brașov
Referee: Roxana Timiș
2 September 2026
18:00

Gloria Bistrița	0–2	Csíkszereda Miercurea Ciuc
	Report	Stahl 42'; Eppel 89'

Jean Pădureanu, Bistrița
Referee: Claudiu Cristian Gaitin
2 September 2026
21:30

Argeș Pitești	0–5	FCSB
	Report	Miculescu 30', 38'; Boutoutaou 69'; D. Popa 81'; Gnahore 90'

Orășenesc, Mioveni
Referee: Rareș George Vidican

28 October 2026

Corona Brașov	v	Argeș Pitești

Metrom, Brașov
28 October 2026

Gloria Bistrița	1-0	FCSB
		Bradu 23'

Jean Pădureanu, Bistrița
Attendance: 7,000
28 October 2026

Csíkszereda Miercurea Ciuc	v	Bihor Oradea

Municipal, Miercurea Ciuc

2 December 2026

Bihor Oradea	v	Argeș Pitești

Iuliu Bodola, Oradea
2 December 2026

FCSB	v	Csíkszereda Miercurea Ciuc

Arena Națională, Bucharest
2 December 2026

Corona Brașov	v	Gloria Bistrița

Metrom, Brașov

=== Group D ===
Pos	Team	Pld	W	D	L	GF	GA	GD	Pts	Qualification	DIN	CRA	VOL	BAC	CHI	LIE
1	Dinamo București	1	1	0	0	4	1	+3	3	Advance to knockout phase	—	—	—	—	28 Oct	—
2	Universitatea Craiova	1	1	0	0	2	1	+1	3	Advance to knockout phase	2 Dec	—	—	—	—	—
3	Voluntari	1	1	0	0	1	0	+1	3		—	28 Oct	—	—	—	—
4	Bacău	1	0	0	1	1	2	−1	0		—	1–2	2 Dec	—	—	—
5	Chindia Târgoviște	1	0	0	1	0	1	−1	0		—	—	0–1	—	—	—
6	Sporting Liești	1	0	0	1	1	4	−3	0		1–4	—	—	28 Oct	2 Dec	—

Updated to match(es) played on 3 September 2026. Source: Flashscore
Legend: Blue = home team win; Yellow = draw; Red = away team win.
1 September 2026
20:00

Chindia Târgoviște	0–1	Voluntari
	Report	Merloi 16'

Eugen Popescu, Târgoviște
Referee: Marius Daniel Bădoiu
2 September 2026
19:00

Sporting Liești	1–4	Dinamo București
Voinea 86' (pen.)	Report	Musi 4', 19'; Cîrjan 16'; Hintsa 83'

Oțelul, Galați
Referee: Mihai-Laurențiu Ene
3 September 2026
17:30

Bacău	1–2	Universitatea Craiova
Robert Ciobanu 52'	Report	Nsimba 25'; Roux 45'

Ruși-Ciutea, Bacău
Referee: Vlad Mircea Baban

28 October 2026

Voluntari	v	Universitatea Craiova

Anghel Iordănescu, Voluntari
28 October 2026

Dinamo București	v	Chindia Târgoviște

Arcul de Triumf, Bucharest
28 October 2026

Sporting Liești	v	Bacău

Comunal, Liești

2 December 2026

Universitatea Craiova	v	Dinamo București

Ion Oblemenco, Craiova
2 December 2026

Bacău	v	Voluntari

Ruși-Ciutea, Bacău
2 December 2026

Sporting Liești	v	Chindia Târgoviște

Comunal, Liești

== Knockout stage ==
=== Bracket ===
Quarter-finals
A1
B2
C1
D2
D1
C2
B1
A2

Semi-finals
QF1
QF2
QF3
QF4

Final
SF1
SF2

== Final ==
12 May 2027	v	TBA
TBA EEST (UTC+03)
