= 2025–26 Cupa României =

Cupa României 2025–26

Tournament details
- Country: Romania
- Dates: 30 July 2025 – 13 May 2026
- Teams: 171 (42 qualifying competition); 136 (main competition incl. 7 qualifiers)

The 2025–26 Cupa României is the 88th season of the annual Romanian football cup competition. It is sponsored by Betano and known as the Cupa României Betano for sponsorship purposes. The winner will qualify for the first qualifying round of the 2026–27 edition of the UEFA Europa League. The main competition will face teams from Liga I through Liga IV.

== Schedule ==
The schedule for this season of Cupa României was released on July 9.

Phase	Round	Clubs remaining	Clubs involved	From previous round	Entries in this round	Dates	Teams entering this round
Regional stage	Group stage	171	42	none	42	9, 12, 16 July 2025	42 2024–25 Liga IV teams
Regional stage	Finals	143	14	14	None	19 July 2025	None
National stage	First Round	136	86	7	79	30 July 2025	TBC (Note: It is unclear which teams will be part of Liga III or IV for the 2025–26 season. As a consequence, the divisions listed in the results below are per the 2024–25 results, but subject to change by the Romanian Football Federation due to licensing issues)
National stage	Second round	93	64	43	17	6 August 2025	TBC
National stage	Third round	61	42	32	10	13 August 2025	10 2025–26 Liga II teams
National stage	Play-off round	40	32	21	11	27 August 2025	3 2025–26 Liga II teams 8 2025–26 Liga I teams (9–16)
National stage	Group stage	24	24	16	8	29 October 2025; 3 December 2025; 11 February 2026	8 2025–26 Liga I teams (1–8)
National stage	Quarter-finals	8	8	8	None	4 March 2026	None
National stage	Semi-finals	4	4	4	None	22 April 2026	None
National stage	Final	2	2	2	None	13 May 2026	None

== Regional stage ==
=== Finals ===
The finals of the regional stage were played on July 19.

19 July 2025	Speranța Răucești (4)	0–4	Pașcani (4)	Răucești
17:30 EEST (UTC+03)				Stadium: Comunal; Referee: Haivas Viorel Mihai

19 July 2025	Unirea Tășnad (4)	1–1 (a.e.t.) (3–4 p)	Viitorul Livezile (4)	Tășnad
17:30 EEST (UTC+03)				Stadium: Unirea; Referee: Bodocan Narcis

19 July 2025	Săcele (3)	2–0	Prima Brăduț (4)	Săcele
17:30 EEST (UTC+03)				Stadium: Electro-Precizia; Referee: Bulibasa Cristian

19 July 2025	Sânandrei Timiș (4)	3–2 (a.e.t.)	Gloria Geoagiu (3)	Carani
17:30 EEST (UTC+03)				Stadium: Comunal; Referee: Hurducas Victor

19 July 2025	Victoria Adunații-Copăceni (4)	4–0	Teleajenul Vălenii de Munte (3)	Mihăilești
17:30 EEST (UTC+03)				Stadium: Baza Sportivă Mihăilești; Referee: Vremăroiu Andrei Florin

19 July 2025	Victoria Cumpăna (4)	2–0	Covurluiul 2021 Târgu Bujor (4)	Cumpăna
17:30 EEST (UTC+03)				Stadium: Centenar 2018; Referee: Pîrlog Tudorel

19 July 2025	Păușești-Otăsău (3)	2–1	Academica Balș (3)	Pietrari
17:30 EEST (UTC+03)				Stadium: Comunal; Referee: Hrușcă Dan

== National stage ==
=== First round ===
With the exception of KSE Târgu Secuiesc's match, all other matches were played on July 30. For the first time since the format change in 2022–23, all 7 regional stage winners made it through to the next stage.

Number of teams per tier still in competition
Liga I (Note: Liga I teams join the competition in the play-off round)	Liga II (Note: Liga II teams join the competition in the second round)	Liga III	Liga IV	Total
16 / 16	21 / 21	84 / 84	14 / 14	136 / 136

29 July 2025	Gheorgheni (3)	3–2	KSE Târgu Secuiesc (3)	Gheorgheni
17:30 EEST (UTC+03)				Stadium: Gheorgheni; Referee: Diaconu Marius

30 July 2025	Flacăra Moreni (3)	2–0	Urban Titu (3)	Moreni
17:30 EEST (UTC+03)				Stadium: Flacăra; Referee: Dumitru Adrian

30 July 2025	Pucioasa (3)	3–2	Tricolorul Breaza (3)	Pucioasa
17:30 EEST (UTC+03)				Stadium: Dumitru Tică Popescu; Referee: Pîrîu Dragoș

30 July 2025	Timișul Șag (3)	10–0	Peciu Nou (3)	Șag
17:30 EEST (UTC+03)				Stadium: Comunal; Referee: Codrea Cristian

30 July 2025	Sânandrei Timiș (4)	3–1 (a.e.t.)	Ghiroda (3)	Carani
17:30 EEST (UTC+03)				Stadium: Comunal; Referee: Manea Alexandru George

30 July 2025	Avântul Periam (4)	2–4 (a.e.t.)	Progresul Pecica (3)	Periam
17:30 EEST (UTC+03)				Stadium: Comunal; Referee: Herczeg Leopold

30 July 2025	Gloria Lunca-Teuz Cermei (3)	1–2	Viitorul Arad (3)	Cermei
17:30 EEST (UTC+03)				Stadium: Comunal; Referee: Kopriva Biro Eniko

30 July 2025	Lotus Băile Felix (3)	2–1	Crișul Sântandrei (3)	Sânmartin
17:30 EEST (UTC+03)				Stadium: Comunal; Referee: Jurca Tudor Florin

30 July 2025	Diosig Bihardiószeg (4)	Walkover	Zalău (3)	Diosig
17:30 EEST (UTC+03)				Stadium: Comunal

30 July 2025	Olimpia MCMXXI Satu Mare (3)	0–2	Sighetu Marmației (3)	Satu Mare
17:30 EEST (UTC+03)				Stadium: Someșul; Referee: Mormeci Dumitru Robert

30 July 2025	Viitorul Livezile (4)	4–1	Unirea Dej (3)	Livezile
17:30 EEST (UTC+03)				Stadium: Central; Referee: Mazilu Florin Ovidiu

30 July 2025	Vulturul Mintiu Gherlii (4)	Walkover	Viitorul Cluj (3)	Mintiu Gherlii
17:30 EEST (UTC+03)				Stadium: Comunal

30 July 2025	CIL Blaj (3)	0–2	Sănătatea Cluj (3)	Blaj
17:30 EEST (UTC+03)				Stadium: CIL Veza; Referee: Ștef Claudiu

30 July 2025	Metalurgistul Cugir (3)	1–2 (a.e.t.)	CSU Alba Iulia (3)	Cugir
17:30 EEST (UTC+03)				Stadium: Arena; Referee: Salomir Mircea

30 July 2025	Avântul Reghin (4)	Walkover	Târgu Mureș 1898 (3)	Reghin
17:30 EEST (UTC+03)				Stadium: Municipal

30 July 2025	Kids Tâmpa Brașov (3)	Walkover	SR Brașov (3)	Brașov
17:30 EEST (UTC+03)				Stadium: ICIM iarbă

30 July 2025	Săcele (3)	4–2	Olimpic Zărnești (3)	Săcele
17:30 EEST (UTC+03)				Stadium: Electro-Precizia; Referee: Moșoiu George Dan

30 July 2025	Codlea (4)	0–4	Mediaș (3)	Codlea
17:30 EEST (UTC+03)				Stadium: Măgura; Referee: Pandelea Mihail

30 July 2025	Gilortul Târgu Cărbunești (3)	1–3	Jiul Petroșani (3)	Târgu Cărbunești
17:30 EEST (UTC+03)				Stadium: Cristinel Răducan; Referee: Iacob Costinel

30 July 2025	Vulturii Fărcășești (3)	9–0	Filiași (3)	Fărcășești
17:30 EEST (UTC+03)				Stadium: Comunal; Referee: Şuvar Alexandru Nicolae

30 July 2025	Păușești-Otăsău (3)	2–0	Viitorul Dăești (3)	Pietrari
17:30 EEST (UTC+03)				Stadium: Comunal; Referee: Dumitru Madalin Alexandru

30 July 2025	Bucovina Rădăuți (3)	Walkover	Gloria Ultra (3)	Rădăuți
17:30 EEST (UTC+03)				Stadium: Municipal

30 July 2025	Șomuz Fălticeni (3)	Walkover	Șoimii Gura Humorului (3)	Fălticeni
17:30 EEST (UTC+03)				Stadium: Constantin Jamaischi

30 July 2025	Pașcani (4)	5–2	USV Iași (3)	Pașcani
17:30 EEST (UTC+03)				Stadium: CFR; Referee: Bălan Dragoș Ionuț

30 July 2025	Vaslui (3)	15–0	CSM Bacău (3)	Vaslui
17:30 EEST (UTC+03)				Stadium: Municipal; Referee: Diaconu Andrei

30 July 2025	Viitorul Onești (3)	1–0 (a.e.t.)	Aerostar Bacău (3)	Filipeşti
17:30 EEST (UTC+03)				Stadium: Baza sportivă Viitorul Onești; Referee: Apetrei Cosmin

30 July 2025	Adjud 1946 (3)	Walkover	Focșani (3)	Adjud
17:30 EEST (UTC+03)				Stadium: Municipal

30 July 2025	Râmnicu Sărat (3)	Walkover	Gloria Buzău (TBD)	Râmnicu Sărat
17:30 EEST (UTC+03)				Stadium: Municipal

30 July 2025	Voința Limpeziș (TBD)	Walkover	Dacia Unirea Brăila (3)	Limpeziș
17:30 EEST (UTC+03)				Stadium: Voința

30 July 2025	Victoria Cumpăna (4)	Walkover	Medgidia (4)	Cumpăna
17:30 EEST (UTC+03)				Stadium: Centenar 2018

30 July 2025	Fetești (4)	0–4	Agricola Borcea (3)	Fetești
17:30 EEST (UTC+03)				Stadium: Municipal; Referee: Stoica Alexandru

30 July 2025	Axiopolis Cernavodă (3)	1–5	Gloria Băneasa (3)	Cernavodă
17:30 EEST (UTC+03)				Stadium: Ideal; Referee: Despina Alexandru

30 July 2025	Înainte Modelu (3)	0–2	Dunărea Călărași (3)	Modelu
17:30 EEST (UTC+03)				Stadium: Vasile Enache; Referee: Mihai Stefano Andrei

30 July 2025	Progresul Fundulea (3)	3–2	Recolta Gheorghe Doja (3)	Fundulea
17:30 EEST (UTC+03)				Stadium: Orășenesc; Referee: Zdrascovici Andreea

30 July 2025	Victoria Adunații-Copăceni (4)	2–1	Dunărea Giurgiu (3)	Mihăilești
17:30 EEST (UTC+03)				Stadium: Baza Sportivă Mihăilești; Referee: Ilie Ionut Catalin

30 July 2025	ACS FC Dinamo (3)	Walkover	Progresul Spartac București (3)	Bucharest
17:30 EEST (UTC+03)				Stadium: Romprim

30 July 2025	Sport Team București (4)	0–7	Ștefănești (3)	Domnești
17:30 EEST (UTC+03)				Stadium: Complex Sportiv Academia Sport Team; Referee: Valusescu Maria Alexandra

30 July 2025	Clinceni (3)	1–0	Alexandria (3)	Clinceni
17:30 EEST (UTC+03)				Stadium: Clinceni 2 – Comunal; Referee: Lăstun Mihail Sebastian

30 July 2025	Sporting Roșiori (4)	1–3	Cetatea Turnu Măgurele (3)	Roșiorii de Vede
17:30 EEST (UTC+03)				Stadium: Municipal; Referee: Diaconu Constantin Adrian

30 July 2025	Petrolul Potcoava (3)	2–3	Oltul Curtișoara (3)	Potcoava
17:30 EEST (UTC+03)				Stadium: Petrolul; Referee: Breoi Nicolae

30 July 2025	Unirea Bascov (3)	1–2	Vedița Colonești (3)	Valea Ursului
17:30 EEST (UTC+03)				Stadium: Comunal; Referee: Amorăriței Mihai

30 July 2025	ARO Muscelul Câmpulung (3)	Walkover	Speed Academy Pitești (3)	Dragoslavele
17:30 EEST (UTC+03)				Stadium: Baza Sportivă Sola Grația Dragoslavele

30 July 2025	Păulești (3)	1–2	Plopeni (3)	Păulești
17:30 EEST (UTC+03)				Stadium: Comunal; Referee: Manu Paul

=== Second round ===
The draw for the second round matches happened on August 1.

Number of teams per tier still in competition
Liga I	Liga II	Liga III	Liga IV	Total
16 / 16	21 / 21	50 / 84	6 / 14	93 / 136

5 August 2025	Lotus Băile Felix (3)	0–10	Olimpia Satu Mare (2)	Sânmartin
17:30 EEST (UTC+03)				Stadium: Comunal; Referee: Bodocan Narcis

6 August 2025	Săcele (3)	1–3	Mediaș (3)	Săcele
17:30 EEST (UTC+03)				Stadium: Electro-Precizia; Referee: Vremăroiu Andrei Florin

6 August 2025	Păușești-Otăsău (3)	0–1	Râmnicu Vâlcea (3)	Pietrari
17:30 EEST (UTC+03)				Stadium: Comunal; Referee: Marinoiu Costin Alexandru

6 August 2025	CSU Alba Iulia (3)	1–4	Unirea Alba Iulia (3)	Sebeș
17:30 EEST (UTC+03)				Stadium: Baza Sportivă Pielarul; Referee: Ștef Claudiu

6 August 2025	Viitorul Livezile (4)	0–4	Gloria Bistrița (2)	Livezile
17:30 EEST (UTC+03)				Stadium: Central; Referee: Șroder Robert

6 August 2025	Avântul Reghin (4)	0–8	Sănătatea Cluj (3)	Reghin
17:30 EEST (UTC+03)				Stadium: Municipal; Referee: Grigorean Mattia

6 August 2025	Viitorul Cluj (3)	1–1 (a.e.t.) (6–5 p)	Zalău (3)	Cluj-Napoca
17:30 EEST (UTC+03)				Stadium: Baza Sportivă Dan Anca; Referee: Mazilu Florin Ovidiu

6 August 2025	Sighetu Marmației (3)	2–0 (a.e.t.)	Minaur Baia Mare (3)	Sighetu Marmației
17:30 EEST (UTC+03)				Stadium: Municipal; Referee: Nagy Vladimir Andrei

6 August 2025	Viitorul Arad (3)	2–1	Progresul Pecica (3)	Arad
17:30 EEST (UTC+03)				Stadium: Motorul; Referee: Necrici Razvan

6 August 2025	Sânandrei Timiș (4)	0–2	Politehnica Timișoara (3)	Carani
17:30 EEST (UTC+03)				Stadium: Comunal; Referee: Matis Claudiu Dantes

6 August 2025	Timișul Șag (3)	0–3	Dumbrăvița (2)	Șag
17:30 EEST (UTC+03)				Stadium: Comunal; Referee: Kemenes Norbert

6 August 2025	Jiul Petroșani (3)	1–0	Minerul Lupeni (3)	Petroșani
17:30 EEST (UTC+03)				Stadium: Petre Libardi; Referee: Amorăriței Mihai

6 August 2025	ARO Muscelul Câmpulung (3)	1–0	Kids Tâmpa Brașov (3)	Câmpulung
17:30 EEST (UTC+03)				Stadium: Muscelul; Referee: Pascu Cristian Antonio

6 August 2025	Vulturii Fărcășești (3)	3–2	FCU 1948 Craiova (3)	Fărcășești
17:30 EEST (UTC+03)				Stadium: Comunal; Referee: Belega Eduard

6 August 2025	Oltul Curtișoara (3)	3–0	Vedița Colonești (3)	Curtișoara
17:30 EEST (UTC+03)				Stadium: Tineretului; Referee: Motan Mihai

6 August 2025	Șoimii Gura Humorului (3)	3–1	Bucovina Rădăuți (3)	Suceava
17:30 EEST (UTC+03)				Stadium: Areni; Referee: Pîrlog Tudorel

6 August 2025	Pașcani (4)	4–1	Știința Miroslava (3)	Pașcani
17:30 EEST (UTC+03)				Stadium: CFR; Referee: Haivas Viorel Mihai

6 August 2025	Vaslui (3)	1–3	Bacău (2)	Vaslui
17:30 EEST (UTC+03)				Stadium: Municipal; Referee: Moisă Mihai

6 August 2025	Viitorul Onești (3)	1–0	Adjud 1946 (3)	Filipeşti
17:30 EEST (UTC+03)				Stadium: Baza sportivă Viitorul Onești; Referee: Florea Bogdan

6 August 2025	Sporting Liești (3)	3–1	Unirea Braniștea (3)	Liești
17:30 EEST (UTC+03)				Stadium: Comunal; Referee: Nanu Ionut Catalin

6 August 2025	Dacia Unirea Brăila (3)	5–5 (a.e.t.) (3–5 p)	Râmnicu Sărat (3)	Lacu Sărat
17:30 EEST (UTC+03)				Stadium: Baza Sportivă Chiscani; Referee: Popa Silviu Gabriel

6 August 2025	Victoria Cumpăna (4)	1–2 (a.e.t.)	Gloria Băneasa (3)	Cumpăna
17:30 EEST (UTC+03)				Stadium: Centenar 2018; Referee: Ioniță Eduard

6 August 2025	Progresul Fundulea (3)	2–3	Popești-Leordeni (3)	Fundulea
17:30 EEST (UTC+03)				Stadium: Orășenesc; Referee: Ghiureș Andrei Alexandru

6 August 2025	Agricola Borcea (3)	3–1	Dunărea Călărași (3)	Borcea
17:30 EEST (UTC+03)				Stadium: Comunal; Referee: Rasteanu Liviu

6 August 2025	Ștefănești (3)	1–3	Tunari (2)	Cernica
17:30 EEST (UTC+03)				Stadium: Comunal; Referee: Fuior Cosmin

6 August 2025	Clinceni (3)	2–0	Progresul Spartac București (3)	Clinceni
17:30 EEST (UTC+03)				Stadium: Clinceni 2 – Comunal; Referee: Dănilă Ștefăniță

6 August 2025	Blejoi (3)	1–3	Dinamo București (2)	Blejoi
17:30 EEST (UTC+03)				Stadium: Comunal; Referee: Frățilă Adrian

6 August 2025	Plopeni (3)	1–2 (a.e.t.)	Băicoi (3)	Plopeni
17:30 EEST (UTC+03)				Stadium: Gheorghe Șilaev; Referee: Oancea Andrei

6 August 2025	Flacăra Moreni (3)	1–3	Chindia Târgoviște (2)	Moreni
17:30 EEST (UTC+03)				Stadium: Flacăra; Referee: Filip Claudiu Andrei

6 August 2025	Pucioasa (3)	0–3	Câmpulung Muscel (2)	Pucioasa
17:30 EEST (UTC+03)				Stadium: Dumitru Tică Popescu; Referee: Sava Florin Adrian

6 August 2025	Victoria Adunații-Copăceni (4)	1–2	Cetatea Turnu Măgurele (3)	Mihăilești
17:30 EEST (UTC+03)				Stadium: Baza Sportivă Mihăilești; Referee: Șerban Matei

7 August 2025	Gheorgheni (3)	2–1	Odorheiu Secuiesc (3)	Gheorgheni
17:30 EEST (UTC+03)				Stadium: Gheorgheni; Referee: Bădărău Raul Sebastian

=== Third round ===
The third round matches will be played on August 12, 13 and 14. The draw took place on August 8.

Number of teams per tier still in competition
Liga I	Liga II	Liga III	Liga IV	Total
16 / 16	21 / 21	23 / 84	1 / 14	61 / 136

12 August 2025	Viitorul Cluj (3)	0–2 (a.e.t.)	Bihor Oradea (2)	Cluj-Napoca
17:30 EEST (UTC+03)				Stadium: Baza Sportivă Dan Anca; Referee: Pîrîu Dragoș

12 August 2025	Viitorul Arad (3)	1–3 (a.e.t.)	Dumbrăvița (2)	Arad
17:30 EEST (UTC+03)				Stadium: Motorul; Referee: Kopriva Biro Eniko

13 August 2025	CSM Pașcani (4)	1–2	Șoimii Gura Humorului (3)	Pașcani
17:30 EEST (UTC+03)				Stadium: CFR; Referee: Ungureanu Diana Madalina

13 August 2025	Viitorul Onești (3)	1–2	Sporting Liești (3)	Filipeşti
17:30 EEST (UTC+03)				Stadium: Baza sportivă Viitorul Onești; Referee: Bulibasa Cristian

13 August 2025	Agricola Borcea (3)	1–0	Gloria Băneasa (3)	Borcea
17:30 EEST (UTC+03)				Stadium: Comunal; Referee: Burloiu Dorin

13 August 2025	Popești-Leordeni (3)	1–2 (a.e.t.)	CS Afumați (2)	Popești-Leordeni
17:30 EEST (UTC+03)				Stadium: Inter Gaz; Referee: Vîrgolici Cristian

13 August 2025	CS Tunari (2)	1–2	FC Voluntari (2)	Tunari
17:30 EEST (UTC+03)				Stadium: Comunal; Referee: Motan Mihai

13 August 2025	CSM Râmnicu Sărat (3)	3–4	Metalul Buzău (2)	Râmnicu Sărat
17:30 EEST (UTC+03)				Stadium: Municipal; Referee: Iftode Silviu Nicolae

13 August 2025	CSO Băicoi (3)	3–2 (a.e.t.)	Chindia Târgoviște (2)	Băicoi
17:30 EEST (UTC+03)				Stadium: Petrolul; Referee: Terteleac Ana Maria

13 August 2025	Clinceni (3)	0–1	Dinamo București (2)	Clinceni
17:30 EEST (UTC+03)				Stadium: Clinceni 2 – Comunal; Referee: Naidin Valentin

13 August 2025	Oltul Curtișoara (3)	1–4	Slatina (2)	Curtișoara
17:30 EEST (UTC+03)				Stadium: Tineretului; Referee: Bădoiu Marius Daniel

13 August 2025	Vulturii Fărcășești (3)	3–2	SCM Râmnicu Vâlcea (3)	Fărcășești
17:30 EEST (UTC+03)				Stadium: Comunal; Referee: Amorăriței Mihai

13 August 2025	ARO Muscelul Câmpulung (3)	0–2	Câmpulung Muscel (2)	Câmpulung
17:30 EEST (UTC+03)				Stadium: Muscelul; Referee: Avram Robert

13 August 2025	Unirea Alba Iulia (3)	2–0	1599 Șelimbăr (2)	Alba Iulia
17:30 EEST (UTC+03)				Stadium: Cetate; Referee: Gherghi Madalina

13 August 2025	Jiul Petroșani (3)	0–2	Corvinul Hunedoara (2)	Petroșani
17:30 EEST (UTC+03)				Stadium: Petre Libardi; Referee: Buzarnescu Dan Stefan

13 August 2025	Politehnica Timișoara (3)	1–0	CSM Reșița (2)	Timișoara
17:30 EEST (UTC+03)				Stadium: Electrica; Referee: Bădărău Raul Sebastian

13 August 2025	Sănătatea Cluj (3)	1–0	ACS Mediaș (3)	Cluj-Napoca
17:30 EEST (UTC+03)				Stadium: Clujana; Referee: Nagy Vladimir Andrei

13 August 2025	CS Gheorgheni (3)	1–5	Gloria Bistrița (2)	Gheorgheni
17:30 EEST (UTC+03)				Stadium: Municipal; Referee: Lunca Dragoș Nicolae

13 August 2025	Sighetu Marmației (3)	3–4 (a.e.t.)	Olimpia Satu Mare (2)	Sighetu Marmației
17:30 EEST (UTC+03)				Stadium: Municipal; Referee: Jurca Tudor Florin

13 August 2025	Cetatea Turnu Măgurele (3)	1–6	Concordia Chiajna (2)	Turnu Măgurele
19:00 EEST (UTC+03)				Stadium: Municipal; Referee: Ioniță Eduard

14 August 2025	FC Bacău (2)	0–2	Ceahlăul Piatra Neamț (2)	Ruși-Ciutea
17:30 EEST (UTC+03)				Stadium: Baza Sportivă FC Bacău; Referee: Breoi Nicolae

=== Play-off round ===
The play-off, scheduled for August 27, features a seeding system.

==== Seeding ====
In this round, 8 seeded teams will face off against 8 of the 24 unseeded teams, while the remaining 16 unseeded teams will compete against each other.

Seeded	Unseeded		
Argeș Pitești (1); Botoșani (1); Csíkszereda Miercurea Ciuc (1); Farul Constanța (1); Metaloglobus (1); Petrolul Ploiești (1); Unirea Slobozia (1); UTA Arad (1)	Afumați (2); Agricola Borcea (3); Băicoi (3); Bihor Oradea (2); Câmpulung Muscel (2); Ceahlăul Piatra Neamț (2); Concordia Chiajna (2); Corvinul Hunedoara (2)	CS Dinamo București (2); Dumbrăvița (2); Gloria Bistrița (2); Metalul Buzău (2); Olimpia Satu Mare (2); Politehnica Iași (2); Politehnica Timișoara (3); Sănătatea Cluj (3)	Sepsi Sfântu Gheorghe (2); Slatina (2); Șoimii Gura Humorului (3); Steaua București (2); Sporting Liești (3); Unirea Alba Iulia (3); Voluntari (2); Vulturii Fărcășești (3)

==== Matches ====
The draw took place on August 19.

Number of teams per tier still in competition
Liga I	Liga II	Liga III	Liga IV	Total
16 / 16	16 / 21	8 / 84	0 / 14	40 / 136

26 August 2025	Steaua București (2)	0–2	UTA Arad (1)	Bucharest
19:00 EEST (UTC+03)				Stadium: Steaua; Referee: Lăstun Mihail Sebastian

27 August 2025	FC Voluntari (2)	1–8	Csíkszereda (1)	Voluntari
17:30 EEST (UTC+03)				Stadium: Anghel Iordănescu; Referee: Robu Ovidiu

27 August 2025	Unirea Alba Iulia (3)	0–1	FC Botoșani (1)	Alba Iulia
17:30 EEST (UTC+03)				Stadium: Cetate; Referee: Buzarnescu Dan Stefan

27 August 2025	Câmpulung Muscel (2)	0–2	Metaloglobus (1)	Buftea
17:30 EEST (UTC+03)				Stadium: CNAF Buftea; Referee: Motan Mihai

27 August 2025	Sănătatea Cluj (3)	1–1 (a.e.t.) (6–5 p)	Unirea Slobozia (1)	Cluj-Napoca
17:30 EEST (UTC+03)				Stadium: Clujana; Referee: Busi Cătălin

27 August 2025	Agricola Borcea (3)	0–1	FC Argeș (1)	Borcea
17:30 EEST (UTC+03)				Stadium: Comunal; Referee: Olaru Constantin Alin

27 August 2025	CSO Băicoi (3)	2–3	Gloria Bistrița (2)	Băicoi
17:30 EEST (UTC+03)				Stadium: Petrolul; Referee: Bădărău Raul Sebastian

27 August 2025	Sporting Liești (3)	2–1	CS Afumați (2)	Liești
17:30 EEST (UTC+03)				Stadium: Comunal; Referee: Ene Mihai Laurențiu

27 August 2025	Vulturii Fărcășești (3)	0–3	Concordia Chiajna (2)	Fărcășești
17:30 EEST (UTC+03)				Stadium: Comunal; Referee: Racoare Arthur

27 August 2025	Metalul Buzău (2)	4–0	Ceahlăul Piatra Neamț (2)	Buzău
17:30 EEST (UTC+03)				Stadium: Metalul; Referee: Peşu Ionela Alina

27 August 2025	Dumbrăvița (2)	2–1	Bihor Oradea (2)	Dumbrăvița
17:30 EEST (UTC+03)				Stadium: Ștefan Dobay; Referee: Iviniș Darius Florin

27 August 2025	Olimpia Satu Mare (2)	0–3	Slatina (2)	Satu Mare
17:30 EEST (UTC+03)				Stadium: Daniel Prodan; Referee: Naidin Marius

27 August 2025	Politehnica Timișoara (3)	2–3	CS Dinamo București (2)	Timișoara
17:30 EEST (UTC+03)				Stadium: Electrica; Referee: Pavel Adelin

27 August 2025	Șoimii Gura Humorului (3)	0–2	Sepsi Sfântu Gheorghe (2)	Suceava
17:30 EEST (UTC+03)				Stadium: Areni; Referee: Salomir Mircea

27 August 2025	Poli Iași (2)	1–2 (a.e.t.)	Petrolul Ploiești (1)	Iași
19:00 EEST (UTC+03)				Stadium: Emil Alexandrescu; Referee: Moldoveanu Cristian

28 August 2025	Corvinul Hunedoara (2)	0–1	Farul Constanța (1)	Hunedoara
17:00 EEST (UTC+03)				Stadium: Michael Klein; Referee: Dima Iulian

== Group stage ==
The draw of the group stage took place on September 26.

=== Seeding ===
Seeding was determined based on the positions achieved in the previous league season.

Pot 1	Pot 2	Pot 3
FCSB (1); CFR Cluj (1); Universitatea Craiova (1); Universitatea Cluj (1); Rapid București (1); FC Dinamo București (1); Hermannstadt (1); Oțelul Galați (1)	Petrolul Ploiești (1); UTA Arad (1); Farul Constanța (1); Botoșani (1); Sepsi Sfântu Gheorghe (1); Argeș Pitești (1); Csíkszereda Miercurea Ciuc (1); Metaloglobus București (1)	Slatina (2); Metalul Buzău (2); Concordia Chiajna (2); Dumbrăvița (2); Gloria Bistrița (2); Sporting Liești (3); CS Dinamo București (2); Sănătatea Cluj (3)

Number of teams per tier still in competition
Liga I	Liga II	Liga III	Liga IV	Total
15 / 16	7 / 21	2 / 84	0 / 14	24 / 136

=== Group A ===
Pos	Team	Pld	W	D	L	GF	GA	GD	Pts	Qualification	ARG	CFR	RAP	DUM	MET	SLA
1	Argeș Pitești	3	3	0	0	7	4	+3	9	Advance to knockout phase	—	—	2–1	—	—	—
2	CFR Cluj	3	1	2	0	7	3	+4	5	Advance to knockout phase	—	—	1–1	—	—	—
3	Rapid București	3	1	1	1	6	3	+3	4		—	—	—	—	—	—
4	Dumbrăvița	3	1	0	2	3	7	−4	3		1–2	—	0–4	—	—	2–1
5	Metaloglobus București	3	0	2	1	6	7	−1	2		2–3	2–2	—	—	—	—
6	Slatina	3	0	1	2	3	8	−5	1		—	0–4	—	—	2–2	—

Source: Flashscore
Legend: Blue = home team win; Yellow = draw; Red = away team win.

=== Group B ===
Pos	Team	Pld	W	D	L	GF	GA	GD	Pts	Qualification	UCV	GLO	UTA	FCS	PET	SAN
1	Universitatea Craiova	3	2	1	0	10	3	+7	7	Advance to knockout phase	—	—	—	2–2	—	—
2	Gloria Bistrița	3	2	0	1	4	4	0	6	Advance to knockout phase	—	—	1–0	1–3	—	—
3	UTA Arad	3	1	1	1	4	2	+2	4		—	—	—	3–0	1–1	—
4	FCSB	3	1	1	1	5	6	−1	4		—	—	—	—	—	—
5	Petrolul Ploiești	3	1	1	1	4	6	−2	4		0–4	—	—	—	—	—
6	Sănătatea Cluj	3	0	0	3	3	9	−6	0		1–4	1–2	—	—	1–3	—

Source: Flashscore
Legend: Blue = home team win; Yellow = draw; Red = away team win.

=== Group C ===
Pos	Team	Pld	W	D	L	GF	GA	GD	Pts	Qualification	UCJ	MET	CSI	OTE	SEP	LIE
1	Universitatea Cluj	3	2	1	0	6	3	+3	7	Advance to knockout phase	—	—	—	2–0	—	—
2	Metalul Buzău	3	2	0	1	9	6	+3	6	Advance to knockout phase	1–2	—	—	—	1–0	—
3	Csíkszereda Miercurea Ciuc	3	1	1	1	6	2	+4	4		—	—	—	1–2	0–0	—
4	Oțelul Galați	3	1	1	1	5	6	−1	4		—	—	—	—	—	—
5	Sepsi Sfântu Gheorghe	3	0	2	1	2	3	−1	2		2–2	—	—	—	—	—
6	Sporting Liești	3	0	1	2	7	15	−8	1		—	4–7	0–5	3–3	—	—

Source: Flashscore
Legend: Blue = home team win; Yellow = draw; Red = away team win.
29 October 2025
15:00 EET (UTC+02)

Metalul Buzău	1–2	Universitatea Cluj
Dumitrache 45+3'		Trică 50'; Taiwo 90+1'

Metalul Stadium, Buzău
Referee: Vlad Băban

4 December 2025
16:15 EET (UTC+02)

Sepsi	2–2	Universitatea Cluj
Ghimfuș 7'; Oroian 16'		Trică 35'; Postolachi 56'

Sepsi Arena, Sfântu Gheorghe
Referee: Robert Avram

11 February 2025
20:00 EET (UTC+02)

Universitatea Cluj	2–0	Oțelul Galați
Lukić 51'; Coubiș 67'

Cluj Arena, Cluj-Napoca
Referee: Andrei Chivulete

=== Group D ===
Pos	Team	Pld	W	D	L	GF	GA	GD	Pts	Qualification	DIN	HER	FAR	BOT	CON	CSD
1	FC Dinamo București	3	2	1	0	5	1	+4	7	Advance to knockout phase	—	2–0	—	—	—	—
2	Hermannstadt	3	2	0	1	4	3	+1	6	Advance to knockout phase	—	—	—	—	—	—
3	Farul Constanța	3	1	2	0	5	1	+4	5		0–0	—	—	—	—	—
4	Botoșani	3	1	1	1	5	6	−1	4		—	1–3	1–1	—	—	—
5	Concordia Chiajna	3	1	0	2	5	4	+1	3		—	0–1	—	2–3	—	—
6	CS Dinamo București	3	0	0	3	1	10	−9	0		1–3	—	0–4	—	0–3	—

Source: Flashscore
Legend: Blue = home team win; Yellow = draw; Red = away team win.
28 October 2025
21:00 EET (UTC+02)

CS Dinamo București	1–3	FC Dinamo București
Cocoș 72'	Report	Caragea 9', 18'; Musi 90'

Arcul de Triumf, Bucharest
Referee: Darius Iviniş

3 December 2025
18:30 EET (UTC+02)

Farul Constanța	0–0	FC Dinamo București

Central, Ovidiu
Referee: Horațiu Feșnic

12 February 2026
18:00 EET (UTC+02)

FC Dinamo București	2–0	FC Hermannstadt
Cîrjan 48'; Opruț 60'

Arcul de Triumf, Bucharest
Referee: Cătălin Roman

== Knockout stage ==
=== Bracket ===
Quarter-finals
FC Argeș Pitești	3
Gloria Bistrița	2
Universitatea Cluj	2
FC Hermannstadt	1
FC Dinamo București	1
Metalul Buzău	0
Universitatea Craiova	3
CFR Cluj	1

Semi-finals
FC Argeș Pitești	1(4)
Universitatea Cluj	1(5)
FC Dinamo București
Universitatea Craiova

Final
Universitatea Cluj
SF2

=== Quarter-finals ===
The matches will be played in a single leg, between March 3-5, 2026. The winners will qualify for the semifinals.

3 March 2026	Universitatea Cluj	2–1	Hermannstadt	Cluj-Napoca
19:00	Mendy 73'; Macalou 81'	Report	Simba 52'	Stadium: Cluj Arena; Attendance: 4,054; Referee: Horia Mladinovici

4 March 2026	Argeș Pitești	3–2 (a.e.t.)	Gloria Bistrița	Mioveni
17:30	Brobbey 17', 90+6'; Moldoveanu 110'	Report	A. Mogoș 75'; Lehaire 78'	Stadium: Orășenesc; Attendance: 1,142; Referee: Andrei Moroiță

4 March 2026	Universitatea Craiova	3–1 (a.e.t.)	CFR Cluj	Craiova
20:30	Mora 69'; A. Crețu 105+1'; Baiaram 118'	Report	Cordea 90'	Stadium: Ion Oblemenco; Attendance: 14,000; Referee: Marian Barbu

5 March 2026	Dinamo București	1–0	Metalul Buzău	București
20:00	Pop 26'	Report		Stadium: Arcul de Triumf; Attendance: 4,383; Referee: Robert Avram

=== Semi-finals ===
The matches will be played in a single leg, between April 21-23, 2026. The winners will qualify for the final.

21 April 2026	Argeș Pitești	1–1 (a.e.t.) (4–5 p)	Universitatea Cluj	Mioveni
19:30	Matos 29' (pen.)	Report	Mendy 75'	Stadium: Orășenesc; Attendance: 4,000; Referee: Marcel Bîrsan
	Penalties
	Sadriu (penalty scored); Brobbey (penalty scored); Borța (penalty scored); Blagaić (penalty scored); Bettaieb (penalty missed)		(penalty scored) Bic; (penalty scored) Lukić; (penalty scored) Mendy; (penalty scored) Drammeh; (penalty scored) Macalou

23 April 2026	Dinamo București	1-1 (a.e.t.) (2-5 p)	Universitatea Craiova	București
20:30		Report		Stadium: Arena Națională

== Final ==
13 May 2026	Universitatea Cluj	0-0 (a.e.t.) (5-6 p)	Universitatea Craiova	Sibiu
TBA EEST (UTC+03)		Report		Stadium: Sibiu Municipal Stadium
