= Dan Anca =

Romanian former footballer (1947–2005)

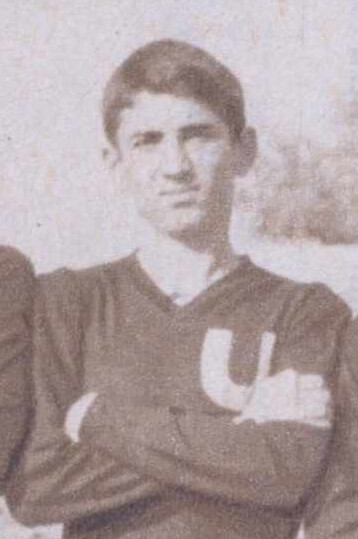
- Anca in 1966

Personal information
- Full name: Dan Sabin Anca
- Date of birth: 7 January 1947
- Place of birth: Turda, Romania
- Date of death: 20 October 2005 (aged 58)
- Place of death: Turda, Romania
- Height: 1.82 m (6 ft 0 in)
- Position: Midfielder

Youth career
- 1959–1961: Chimia Turda

Senior career*
Years	Team	Apps	(Gls)
1961–1964	Chimia Turda		
- → Unirea Dej
1964–1980	Universitatea Cluj	398	(32)

International career^{‡}
1966–1970	Romania U23	15	(0)
1966	Romania B	1	(0)
1969–1973	Romania	7	(0)

Managerial career
- 1980–1981: Universitatea Cluj (assistant)
- 1989: Universitatea Cluj (assistant)
- 1989–1990: Universitatea Cluj
- 1993–1994: Universitatea Cluj
- 1995–1997: Universitatea Cluj
- 1998–1999: Universitatea Cluj
- 2002: Universitatea Cluj
- 2002–2003: Universitatea Cluj
- * Club domestic league appearances and goals as of 31 December 2019 ‡ National team caps and goals as of 31 December 2019

Dan Sabin Anca (7 January 1947 – 20 October 2005) was a Romanian football midfielder and manager for Universitatea Cluj.

== Club career ==
Anca was born on 7 January 1947 in Turda, Romania and began playing junior-level football in 1959 at local club Chimia. When he was 14, he started to play for Chimia at senior level in the Romanian lower leagues and he also played for a few months at Unirea Dej during his military service. He joined Universitatea Cluj in 1964, after two of the club's officials, Dr. Mircea Luca and Dr. Ioanete, came to his home to convince his parents to allow him to play for the team.

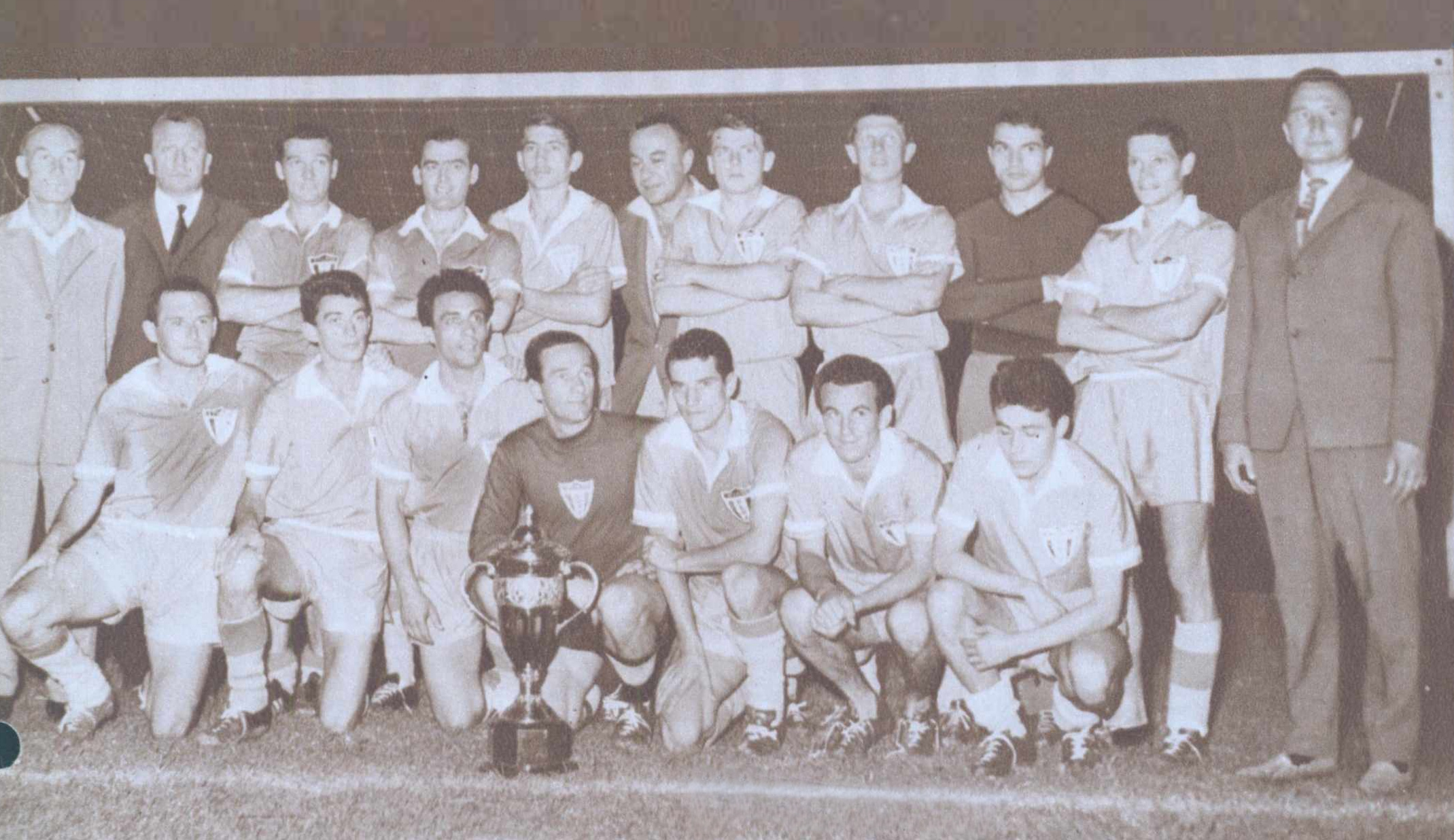
Anca (standing, fifth from the left) with Știința Cluj in 1965

Anca would spend the rest of his career with "U", making his Divizia A debut under coach Andrei Sepci on 8 November 1964 in a 3–1 home loss to CSMS Iași. At the end of his first season, the club won the 1964–65 Cupa României, but he was not used by Sepci in the 2–1 victory in the final against Dinamo Pitești. He scored his first goals for the club in the 1967–68 season, netting the only goal of a victory against Steagul Roșu Brașov, one goal in a 2–0 win over Dinamo Bacău and his team's goal in a 1–1 draw against Steaua București at the Ghencea stadium. Anca played 30 games and scored seven goals in the 1971–72 season, helping The Red Caps finish in third position. Thus, the team earned a spot in the 1972–73 UEFA Cup, where he played in both matches in the first round as Levski Sofia defeated them 6–5 on aggregate. At the end of the 1975–76 season, the team was relegated to Divizia B, but Anca stayed with the club, helping it obtain promotion back to the first league after three years. He made his last Divizia A appearance on 11 November 1979 in a 2–0 away loss to FC Baia Mare, totaling 318 matches with 25 goals in the competition.

== International career ==
Anca appeared in seven matches for Romania, making his debut on 15 January 1969 under coach Angelo Niculescu in a 1–1 friendly draw against England played at the Wembley Stadium in London, where he delivered an appreciated performance against his direct opponent, Bobby Charlton. He also played two games in the Euro 1972 qualifiers and one during the 1974 World Cup qualifiers. His last appearance for the national team was a friendly which occurred on 18 April 1973 and ended in a 2–0 away loss to Soviet Union.

== Managerial career ==
As his playing career, Anca spent his entire managerial career at Universitatea Cluj. He started at the end of the 1979–80 Divizia A season when he worked as Gheorghe Staicu's assistant, also guiding the team together for the entire following season. In the middle of the 1988–89 Divizia A season, he worked again as an assistant, this time with Cornel Dinu as head coach. In the next season he replaced Dinu after the 9th round, leading the team as head coach until the 20th round when he was succeeded by Ștefan Sameș. Anca worked on a few other occasions as head coach at "U", his last spell taking place in the 2002–03 Divizia B season, totaling 112 matches as a manager in the Romanian top-division, Divizia A, consisting of 35 victories, 22 draws and 55 losses.

== Personal life ==
His brother was also a footballer who played for Cimentul Turda, and while Anca played for Chimia, they played against each other.

He was married to Floarea Anca who was an international basketball player and they had a son together. Anca died on 20 October 2005 at age 58 in his native Turda, and the multi-use stadium, Baza Sportivă Dan Anca in Cluj-Napoca was named after him.

Journalist Ion Arcaș said about him:"No, he was not a talent like Zoltán Ivansuc, but when will another Ivansuc be born? He was not proud like Mateieanu; but how many live on pride? He wasn't a star like Petru Emil, but how many stars don't become ephemeris? He was not a hope; but how many high hopes were not true illusions? He was a modest, hardworking, disciplined footballer, who gave shine to the "peaks", "sacreds" carried on the arms of enthusiasm."

== Honours ==
=== Player ===
Universitatea Cluj

- Cupa României: 1964–65
- Divizia B: 1978–79
