= FC Viitorul Onești =

Romanian football club

Viitorul Onești
- Full name: Fotbal Club Viitorul Onești
- Nicknames: Oneștenii (The people from Onești); Alb-verzii (The white and greens)
- Short name: Onești
- Founded: 2015; 11 years ago as Viitorul Curița
- Ground: Viitorul
- Capacity: 650
- Owner: Mihai Fudulache
- Chairman: Constantin Brînză
- Head coach: Silviu Ion
- League: Liga III
- 2025–26: Liga III, Seria I, 5th

Fotbal Club Viitorul Onești, commonly known as Viitorul Onești, is a Romanian football club based in Onești, Bacău County, that currently competes in Liga III, the third tier of Romanian football. Founded in 2015 as Viitorul Curița, the club was promoted to Liga III at the end of the 2022–23 season and changed its name to Viitorul Onești in 2024.

== History ==
The club was founded in 2015 by local businessman Mihai Fudulache as Viitorul Curița, in Curița, a village that is part of the commune of Cașin, located southwest of Onești, playing its home matches on the field of the local general school. Constantin Ene was appointed as its first head coach, and the team competed in Liga IV – Bacău County, finishing in 9th place in its debut season.

In the 2016–17 season, Viitorul relocated its matches to the CSM Stadium in Onești, won the county league title and qualified for the promotion play-off to Liga III, where it lost to Sănătatea Darabani, the Botoșani County champion, (0–1 away and 3–4 at home). The team also won the Romanian Cup – county phase that season. The squad included Sitaru, Duță, Cuciureanu, Irimia, Apostu, Afilipoaie, Soroiu, Grigore, Marcu, Padovei, Ardeleanu, Mihalache, Folea, Socaciu, Toader, Corman, Lupu, A. Mîșu, Brânză, and Fudulache.

In the 2017–18 season, Viitorul finished as runners-up in Liga IV – Bacău County, eight points behind Gauss Bacău, and won the Romanian Cup – county phase.

During the 2018–19 season, Constantin Ene resigned in September 2018, and Adrian Gheorghiu was appointed as the new head coach, making his debut in the role. The team finished 1st in the Valea Trotușului Series but ended as runners-up after the county league play-off stage, one point behind CSM Bacău, while also winning the Romanian Cup – county phase for the second consecutive season.

In the 2019–20 season, with Rareș Mihalache starting the campaign as head coach, Viitorul Curița was in 1st place in the Valea Trotușului Series at the moment of the interruption caused by the COVID-19 pandemic, five points ahead of Voința Oituz. When the competition resumed, the team contested the county championship final against Dinamo Bacău, winners of the Bacău Series. Coached by Constantin Ene, Viitorul won the title after a 1–0 away victory and a 3–1 home win. The squad included Petrache, Vătămanu, Corman, Maxim, A. Mîșu, V. Mîșu, Sitaru, Ardeleanu, Șchiopu, Gîză, Sbârcea, Mihalache and Marcu. In the promotion play-off tournament held in Pașcani, the team finished last, behind Dante Botoșani, the Botoșani County winners, and Sporting Juniorul Vaslui, the Vaslui County winners.

In the 2020–21 season, Viitorul competed in a short tournament that was initially postponed and later held with just four teams due to the high costs caused by the COVID-19 pandemic. The team ranked 2nd and lost the county league final 1–1 (4–5 on penalties) to Dinamo Bacău.

In 2021, Viitorul Curița entered into a partnership with the youth sports institution Club Sportiv Școlar Onești (lit. 'School Sports Club Onești') and competed under the hybrid name Viitorul Curița/CSȘ Onești. The team participated in Series II during the 2021–22 season, finishing 2nd in the regular season and last in the county championship play-off after being excluded for two no-shows.

In the 2022–23 season, the club reverted to the name Viitorul Curița and inaugurated on 8 October 2022 its own ground within the Viitorul academy sports complex, in the village of Filipești, Bogdănești commune, near Onești. The team finished 1st in Series II, won the county league play-off stage, and secured promotion to Liga III for the first time in its history, as Victoria Horia, Neamț County winners, did not meet the conditions required for participation in the promotion play-off to the third tier.

Placed in Series V for the 2023–24 Liga III season, Viitorul Curița started the campaign with Giani Florian as head coach, but the club parted ways with him in November 2023 after thirteen rounds. Following a short interim period under assistant coach George Sbîrcea, Florin Croitoru took charge during the winter break, leading the team to an 8th-place finish in the regular season and 6th place in the play-out series stage.

The 2024–25 campaign saw the club change its name to Viitorul Onești, with Ioan Sdrobiș appointed as technical director and Ovidiu Dănănae as head coach. However, due to poor results, Dănănae was replaced during the winter break by Liviu Ștefan, who led the team to finish 8th in both the regular and play-out series stages.

Viitorul Onești began the 2025–26 Liga III campaign with Silviu Ion as head coach, reaching the third round of the Cupa României before losing 1–2 to Sporting Liești.

== Honours ==
Liga IV – Bacău County

- Winners (3): 2016–17, 2019–20, 2022–23
- Runners-up (3): 2017–18, 2018–19, 2020–21

Cupa României – Bacău County

- Winners (4): 2016–17, 2017–18, 2018–19, 2019–20
- Runners-up (1): 2022–23

== Former managers ==
- (Romania) Constantin Ene (2015–2018)
- (Romania) Adrian Gheorghiu (2018–2019)
- (Romania) Rareș Mihalache (2019–2020)
- (Romania) Constantin Ene (2020–2023)
- (Romania) Giani Florian (2023)
- (Romania) Florin Croitoru (2023–2024)
- (Romania) Ovidiu Dănănae (2024)
- (Romania) Liviu Ștefan (2025)
- (Romania) Silviu Ion (2025–)
