= Carpați Stadium (2024) =

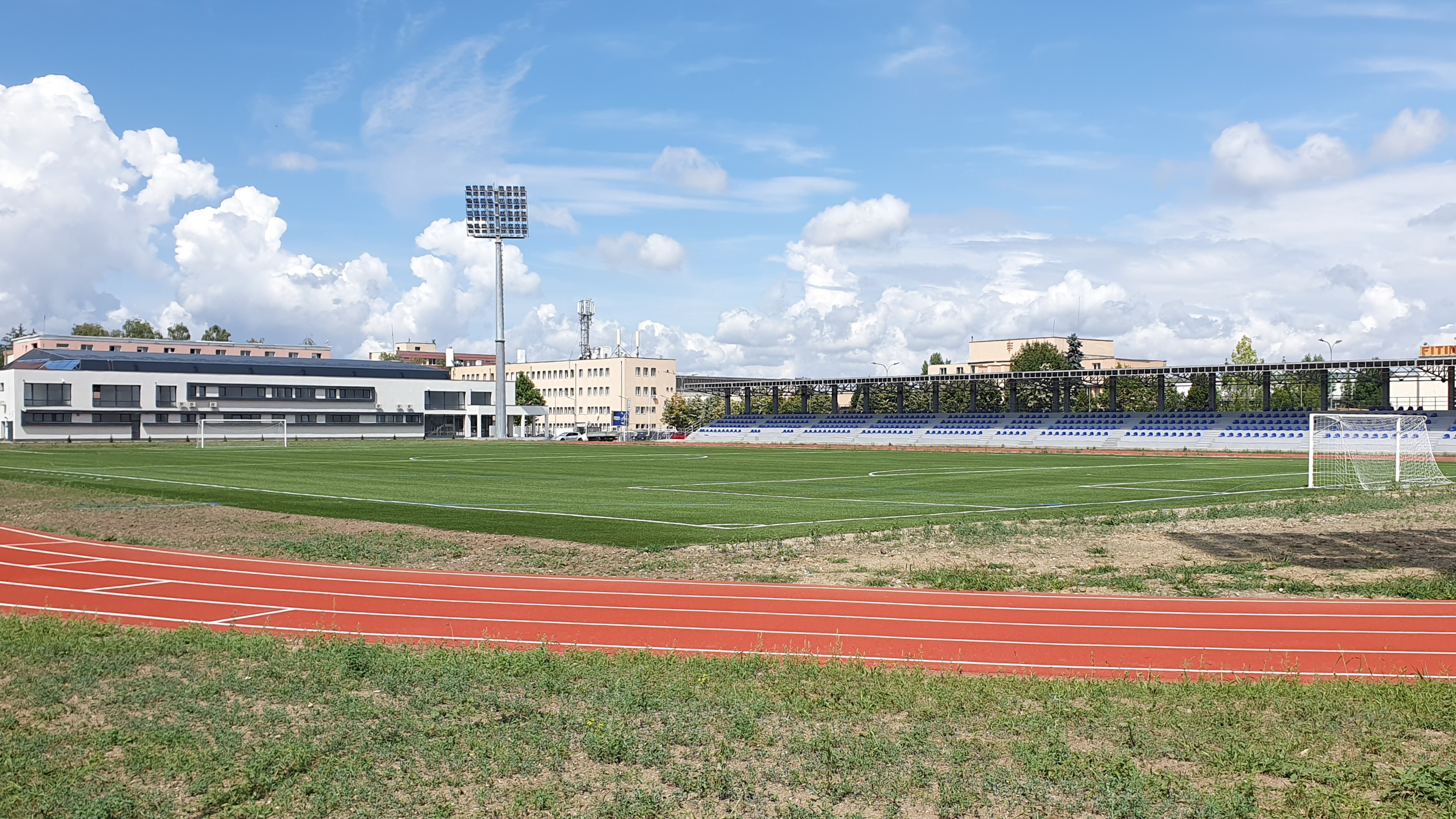
- UEFA
- Interactive map of Carpați Stadium
- Address: Str. Zizinului, nr. 119
- Location: Brașov, Romania
- Coordinates: 45°38′53″N 25°39′01″E
- Owner: Municipality of Brașov
- Capacity: 500 all seated
- Surface: Artificial turf
- Field size: 105 m × 68 m (115 yd × 74 yd)

Construction
- Groundbreaking: 22 May 2020
- Built: 2020–2024
- Opened: 13 November 2024
- Cost: €9.5 million
- Main contractor: Romconstruct Group

Carpaţi Stadium is a multi-use stadium in Brașov, Romania, it is used mostly for football matches and has a capacity of 500 seats. The stadium was built on the site of former Carpați Stadium, which was opened in 1950s and demolished in 2020. The stadium was officially opened on 13 November 2024.
