= Stadionul Comunal (Sânmartin) =

Sports venue in Sânmartin, Romania

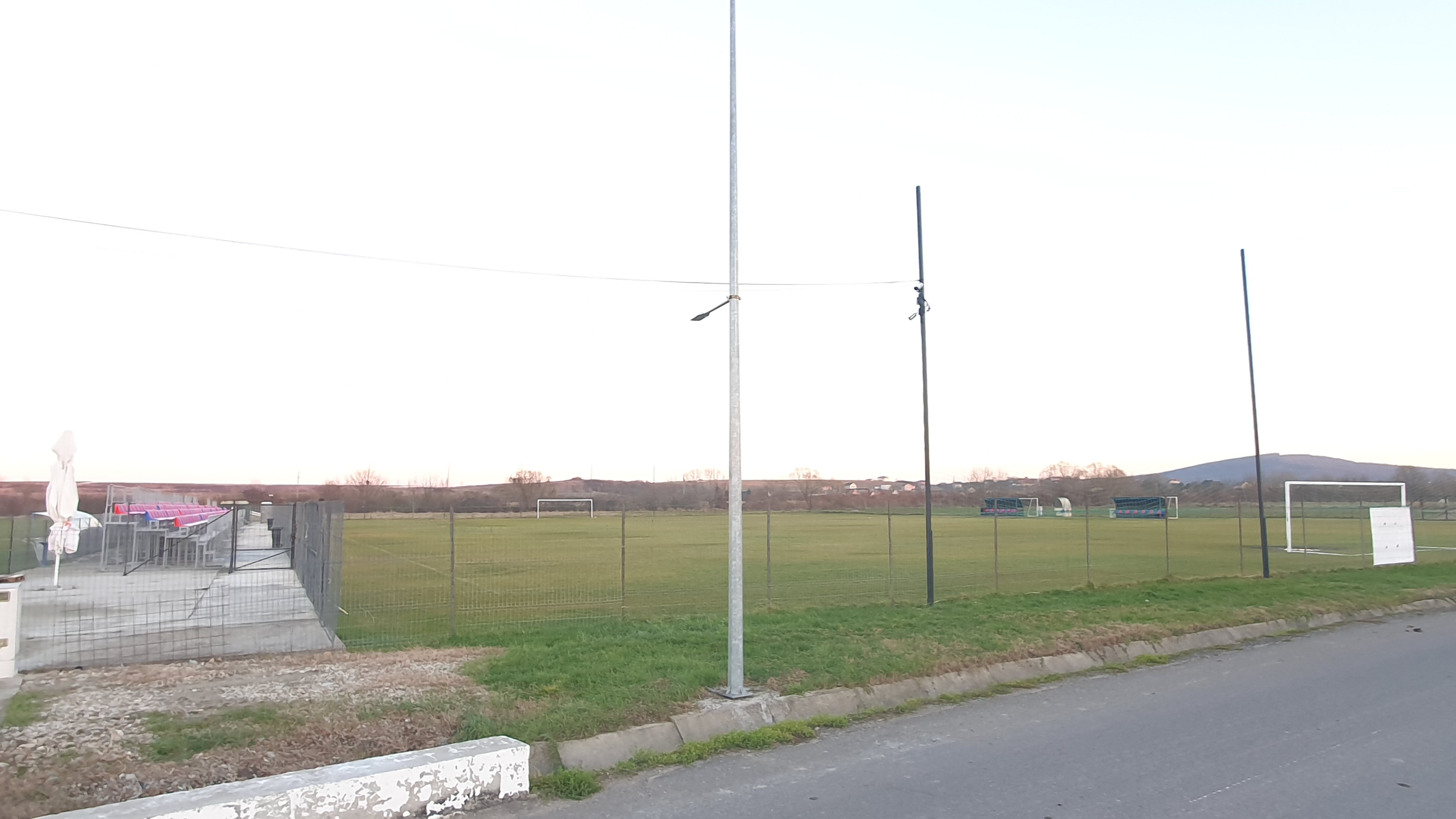
- Interactive map of Stadionul Comunal
- Address: Str. Stadionului
- Location: Sânmartin, Romania
- Coordinates: 47°00′37.3″N 21°58′37.1″E
- Owner: Commune of Sânmartin
- Operator: Lotus Băile Felix
- Capacity: 261
- Surface: Grass

Construction
- Groundbreaking: 2018
- Opened: 2020

Tenant
- Lotus Băile Felix (2020–present)

Stadionul Comunal is a multi-purpose stadium in Sânmartin, Romania. It is currently used mostly for football matches, is the home ground of Lotus Băile Felix and has a capacity of 261people.
