= Arena Cugir =

Multi-purpose stadium in Cugir, Romania

- Interactive map of Arena Cugir
- Former names: Stadionul Metalurgistul; Arena CSO
- Address: Str. Înfrățirii
- Location: Cugir, Romania
- Coordinates: 45°50′22.5″N 23°21′59.4″E
- Owner: Town of Cugir
- Operator: CSO Cugir
- Capacity: 4,000 (1,200 seated)
- Surface: Grass

Construction
- Opened: 1930s
- Renovated: 1970s, 2015–2016

Tenant
- Cugir (1939–present)

Arena Cugir is a multi-purpose stadium in Cugir, Romania. It is currently used mostly for football matches, is the home ground of CSO Cugir and has a capacity of 4,000 people (1,200 on seats). The stadium was opened in the 1930s and was known as Stadionul Metalurgistul, then as Arena CSO until the last renovation works, when the stadium was seriously modernized and renamed as Arena Cugir.

In Cugir, during the communist period was built another stadium, known also as Stadionul Metalurgistul, but mainly as Stadionul Nou or Stadionul Parc. The stadium has a capacity of 12,000 people and is owned by Cugir Mechanical Plant, but in the last years was abandoned due to high maintenance costs and its facilities, which were inconsistent with the needs of local sports clubs, being too large, outdated and difficult to modernize.
