= Stadionul Municipal (Sighetu Marmației) =

Multi-use stadium in Romania

- Solovan
- Interactive map of Stadionul Municipal
- Former names: Marmația
- Address: Str. Traian Bilțiu Dăncuș
- Location: Sighetu Marmației, Romania
- Coordinates: 47°55′13.5″N 23°53′01.6″E
- Owner: Sighetu Marmației Municipality
- Operator: CSM Sighetu Marmației; Plimob Sighetu Marmației
- Capacity: 5,000
- Surface: grass

Construction
- Opened: 1936
- Renovated: 2014

Tenants
- CIL Sighetu Marmației (1936–1991); CSM Sighetu Marmației (1996–present); Plimob Sighetu Marmației (2011–present)

Stadionul Municipal Solovan is a multi-use stadium in Sighetu Marmației, Romania. It is used mostly for football matches and is the home ground of CSM Sighetu Marmației and Plimob Sighetu Marmației. The stadium holds 5,000 people.
