= Stadionul Electro-Precizia =

Multi-use stadium in Săcele, Romania

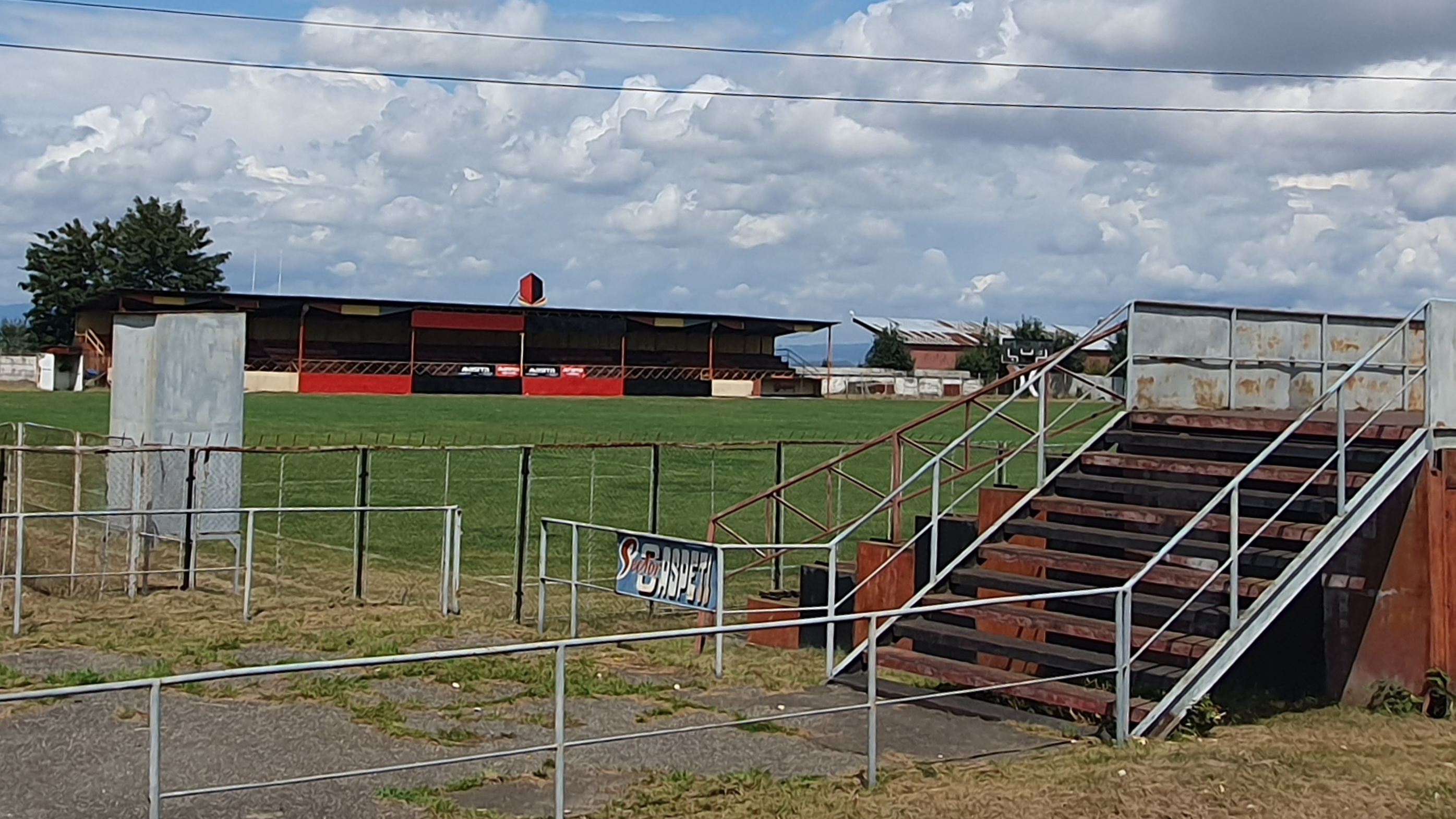
- Interactive map of Stadionul Electro-Precizia
- Address: Str. Viitorului
- Location: Săcele, Romania
- Coordinates: 45°37′0″N 25°43′24″E
- Owner: Municipality of Săcele
- Operator: CSM Săcele
- Capacity: 2,000 seated
- Surface: Grass

Construction
- Opened: 1950s
- Renovated: 2000s

Tenant
- CSM Săcele (1950–present)

Electro-Precizia Stadium is a multi-use stadium in Săcele, Brașov County. It is used mostly for football matches and is the home ground of CSM Săcele. The stadium holds 2,000 people.
