= Pietrari, Vâlcea =

Pietrari
- Commune
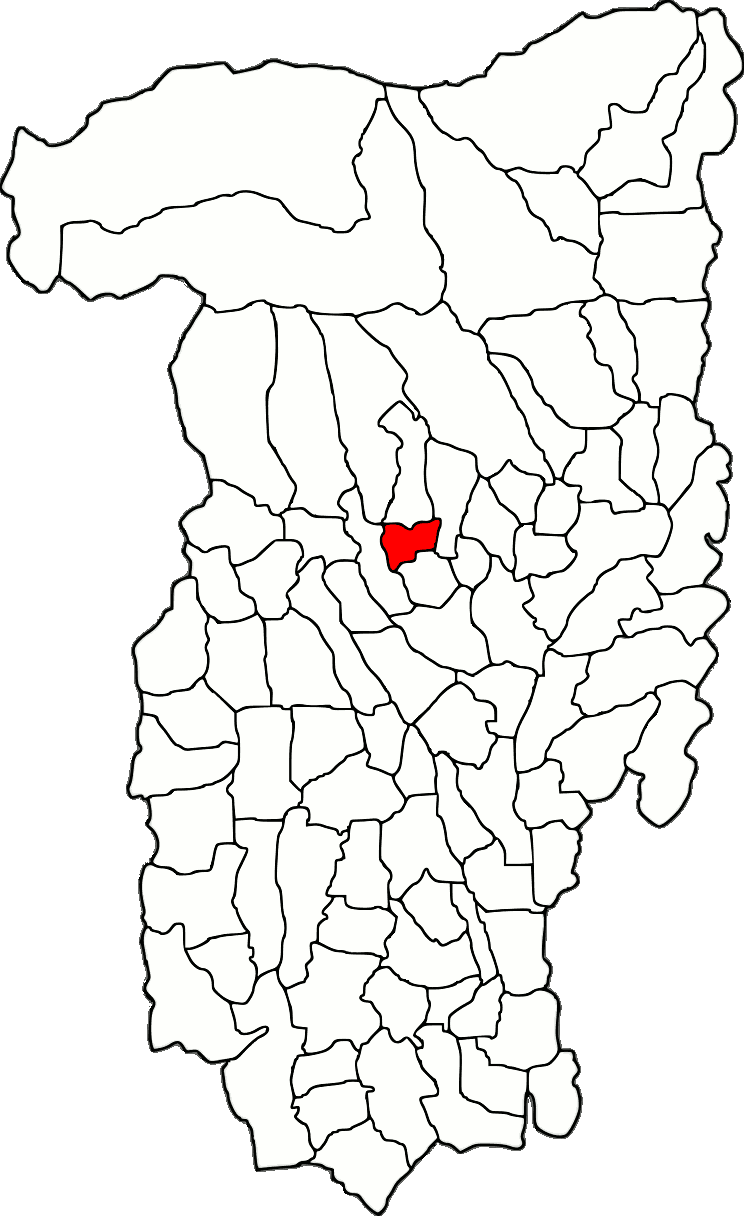
- Location in Vâlcea County

- Location in Romania
- Coordinates: 45°6′N 24°7′E
- Country: Romania
- County: Vâlcea
- Area: 19.47 km^{2} (7.52 sq mi)
- Population (2021-12-01): 2,647
  - Density: 136.0/km^{2} (352.1/sq mi)
- Time zone: UTC+02:00 (EET)
  - Summer (DST): UTC+03:00 (EEST)
- Vehicle reg.: VL

Pietrari is a commune located in Vâlcea County, Oltenia, Romania. It is composed of two villages, Pietrari and Pietrarii de Sus.
