= Dumitru Tică Popescu Stadium =

Sports venue in Pucioasa, Romania

- Interactive map of Dumitru Tică Popescu Stadium
- Address: Str. Stadionului
- Location: Pucioasa, Romania
- Coordinates: 45°04′24.1″N 25°26′25.2″E
- Owner: Town of Pucioasa
- Operator: FC Pucioasa
- Capacity: 1,000 seated
- Surface: Grass

Tenants
- Viitorul Pucioasa (2003–2009); PAS Pucioasa (2011–2017); Pucioasa (2018–present)

The Dumitru Tică Popescu Stadium is a multi-purpose stadium in Pucioasa, Romania. It is currently used mostly for football matches, is the home ground of FC Pucioasa and has a capacity of 1,000 seats. In the past, the stadium was also the home ground of other local teams such as Viitorul Pucioasa or PAS Pucioasa.
