= Electrica Stadium =

Romanian stadium

- Stadionul Electrica
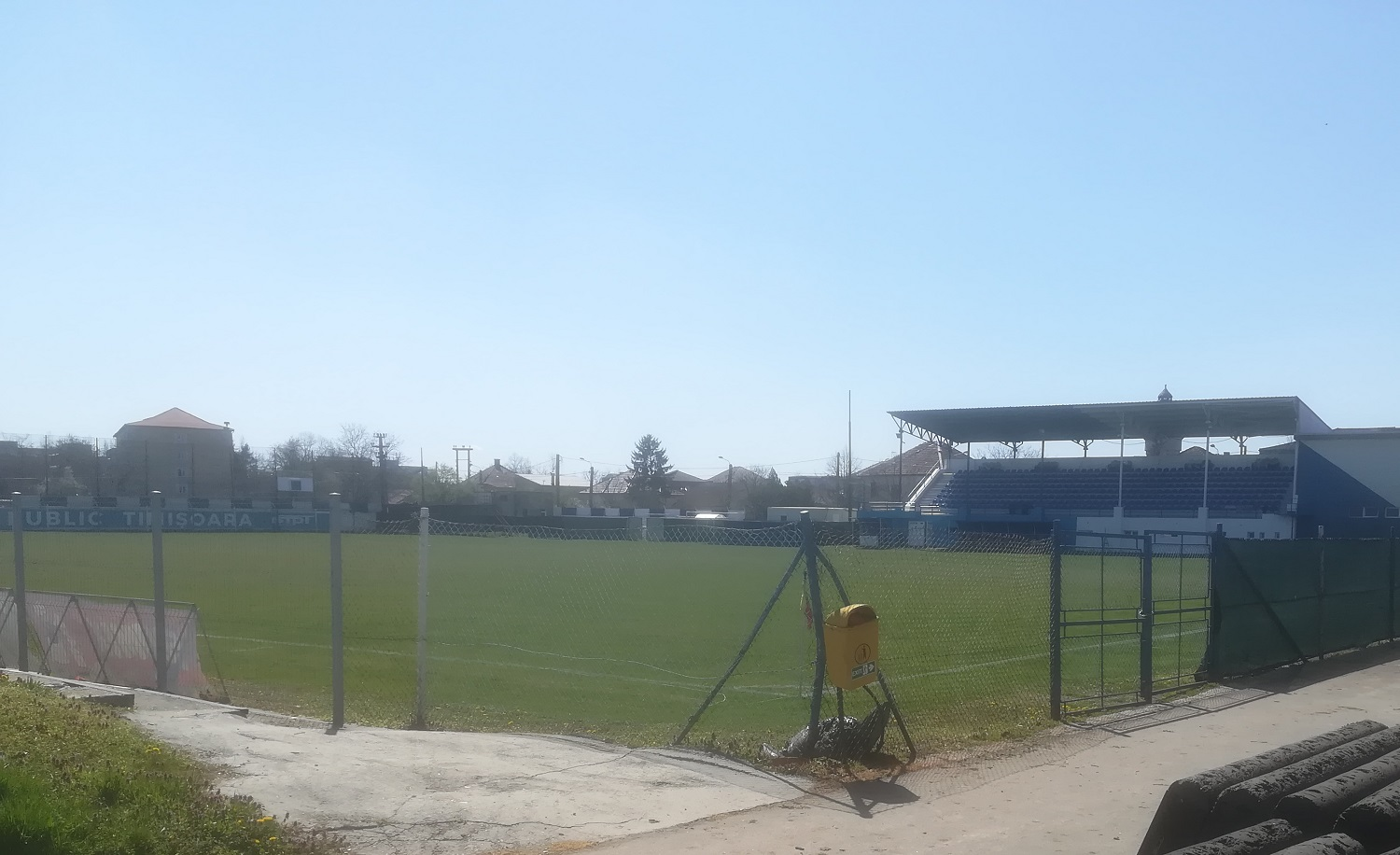
- Interactive map of Electrica Stadium
- Address: 28 Renașterii Street; Timișoara; Romania
- Coordinates: 45°46′8.5″N 21°15′16″E
- Owner: Timișoara Public Transport Company
- Operator: Ripensia Timișoara
- Capacity: 5,000 (500 on seats)
- Surface: Grass
- Field size: 105 × 68 m

Construction
- Opened: 1960
- Renovated: 2016, 2020

Tenants
- Electrica Timișoara (1960–present); Politehnica II Timișoara (2006–2008); Ripensia Timișoara (2012–2014; 2019–present); Poli Timișoara (2018–2021)

Electrica Stadium (Romanian: Stadionul Electrica) is a multi-purpose stadium in Timișoara, Romania. It is currently used mostly for football matches and is the home ground of Electrica Timișoara and Ripensia Timișoara. The stadium holds 5,000 people and is located in the Fabric district. In the past it was also the home ground of Politehnica II Timișoara.

In the past, Stadionul UMT, which was placed just a few meters away, was named also as Stadionul Electrica, fact that created some confusion over time.
