= Baza Sportivă Dan Anca =

Multi-purpose stadium in Romania

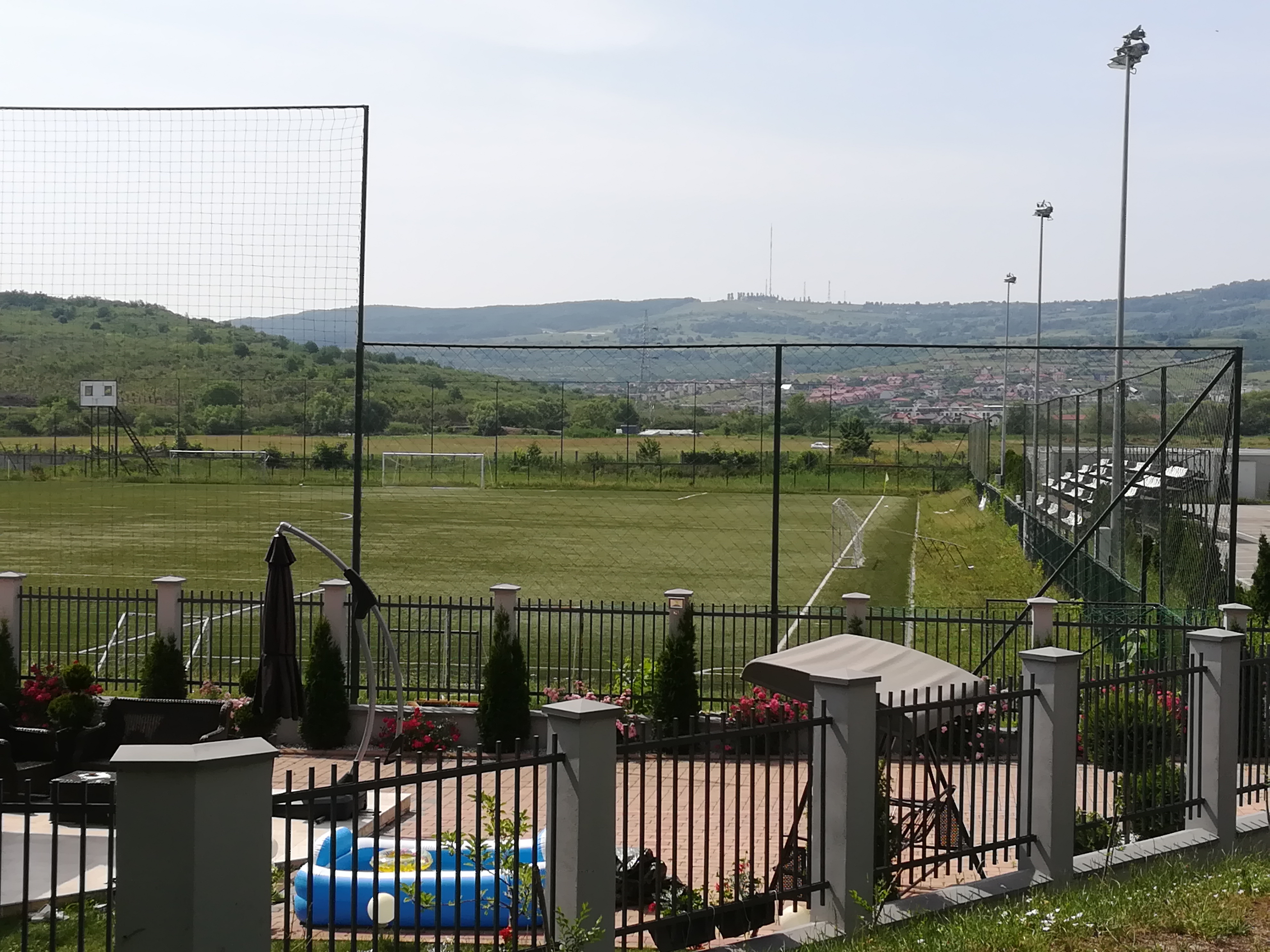
- Interactive map of Baza Sportivă Dan Anca
- Former names: Baza Sportivă DROMEX
- Address: Aleea Detunata
- Location: Cluj-Napoca, Romania
- Coordinates: 46°45′52.1″N 23°37′46.4″E
- Owner: Viitorul Cluj
- Operator: Viitorul Cluj
- Capacity: 1,000
- Surface: Artificial turf

Construction
- Opened: 2011

Tenants
- Universitatea Cluj; Universitatea II Cluj (2017–2021); Viitorul Cluj (2021–present); Sănătatea Cluj (2022)

Baza Sportivă Dan Anca, formerly known as Baza Sportivă DROMEX or Baza Sportivă Detunata, is a multi-use stadium in Cluj-Napoca, Romania. The sport base was opened in 2011 on the place of old Baza Sportivă Detunata and it is used mostly for football matches, being the home ground of Viitorul Cluj. The stadium holds 1,000 people and is also used for Universitatea Cluj's youth center squads matches and trainings. Except for a main ground with a pitch of normal dimensions, covered with artificial turf, the complex contains several other football pitches with grass or artificial turf. The name of the stadium is in honour of footballer Dan Anca, who spent his entire career at Universitatea Cluj.
