= Curtișoara =

Curtişoara
- Commune
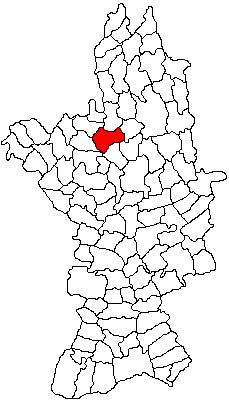
- Location in Olt County

- Location in Romania
- Coordinates: 44.494°N 24.331°E
- Country: Romania
- County: Olt
- Population (2021-12-01): 4,413
- Time zone: EET/EEST (UTC+2/+3)
- Vehicle reg.: OT

Curtișoara is a commune in Olt County, Muntenia, Romania. It is composed of six villages: Curtișoara, Dobrotinet, Linia din Vale, Pietrișu, Proaspeți and Raițiu.
