= 1997–98 Divizia D =

56th season of the Liga IV, the fourth tier of the Romanian football league

Liga IV
- Season: 1997–98

The 1997–98 Divizia D was the 56th season of the Liga IV, the fourth tier of the Romanian football league system. The champions of each county association play against one from a neighboring county in a play-off match played on a neutral venue. The winners of the play-off matches promoted to Divizia C.

== County leagues ==
- Alba (AB)
- Arad (AR)
- Argeș (AG)
- Bacău (BC)
- Bihor (BH)
- Bistrița-Năsăud (BN)
- Botoșani (BT)
- Brașov (BV)
- Brăila (BR)
- Bucharest (B)
- Buzău (BZ)
- Caraș-Severin (CS)
- Călărași (CL)
- Cluj (CJ)
- Constanța (CT)
- Covasna (CV)
- Dâmbovița (DB)
- Dolj (DJ)
- Galați (GL)
- Giurgiu (GR)
- Gorj (GJ)
- Harghita (HR)
- Hunedoara (HD)
- Ialomița (IL)
- Iași (IS)
- Ilfov (IF)
- Maramureș (MM)
- Mehedinți (MH)
- Mureș (MS)
- Neamț (NT)
- Olt (OT)
- Prahova (PH)
- Satu Mare (SM)
- Sălaj (SJ)
- Sibiu (SB)
- Suceava (SV)
- Teleorman (TR)
- Timiș (TM)
- Tulcea (TL)
- Vaslui (VS)
- Vâlcea (VL)
- Vrancea (VN)

== Promotion play-off ==
The matches were played on 28 May 1998.

Team 1	Score	Team 2
Șantierul Naval Tulcea (TL)	0–2	(IL) Unirea Slobozia
Jandarmii Dorobanțu (CT)	1–0	(CL) Sportul Drumu Subțire
Petrolul Brăila (BR)	0–2	(PH) Chimia Brazi
Avântul Liești (GL)	0–2	(BZ) Hidroconcas Buzău
Sportul Municipal Vaslui (VS)	2–3	(BT) Unirea Botoșani
Tricotex Panciu (VN)	0–2	(NT) Cimentul Bicaz
Gloria Zemeș (BC)	1–2	(SV) Unirea Milișăuți
RATC Iași (IS)	0–4	(HR) Budvar Odorheiu Secuiesc
Record Mediaș (SB)	4–2	(CV) Fortyogó Târgu Secuiesc
Textila Prejmer (BV)	0–1	(IF) Fulgerul Bragadiru
Electromureș Târgu Mureș (MS)	4–2	(MM) Progresul Șomcuta Mare
Mecanica Bistrița (BN)	0–3	(SJ) Minerul Sărmășag
Someșul Satu Mare (SM)	1–0	(CJ) Cimentul Turda
Minerul Șuncuiuș (BH)	1–3	(HD) Aurul Brad
Șoimii Pâncota (AR)	2–1	(GJ) Gilortul Târgu Cărbunești
Obilici Sânmartinu Sârbesc (TM)	3–0	(MH) Dierna Orșova
Minerul Moldova Nouă (CS)	2–3	(DJ) Bere Craiova
Flacăra Horezu (VL)	2–0	(AB) Soda Ocna Mureș
Forestierul Stâlpeni (AG)	3–1	(GR) Petrolul Roata de Jos
Petrolul Târgoviște (DB)	1–2	(OT) Progresul Caracal
Electro-Turris Turnu Măgurele (TR)	2–1	(B) Grivița București

== Leagues standings ==
=== Arad County ===
Pos	Team	Pld	W	D	L	GF	GA	GD	Pts	Qualification or relegation
1	Șoimii Pâncota (C, Q)	34	25	2	7	74	37	+37	77	Qualification to promotion play-off
2	Șoimii Lipova	34	24	3	7	87	40	+47	75	
3	Vladimirescu	34	22	4	8	87	40	+47	70	
4	Indagrara Arad	34	19	4	11	87	49	+38	61	
5	Gloria Arad	34	17	3	14	60	52	+8	54	
6	Gloria Cermei	34	17	3	14	70	48	+22	54	
7	Ineu	34	16	4	14	61	60	+1	52	
8	Universitatea Arad	34	14	8	12	53	49	+4	50	
9	Motorul Arad	34	15	3	16	71	54	+17	48	
10	Tricoul Roșu Arad	34	13	9	12	61	63	−2	48	
11	Frontiera Curtici	34	14	5	15	53	53	0	47	
12	Crișul Chișineu-Criș	34	14	4	16	63	62	+1	46	
13	Crișana Sebiș	34	13	4	17	64	85	−21	43	
14	Victoria Nădlac	34	11	7	16	49	87	−38	40	
15	CPL Arad	34	11	5	18	53	75	−22	38	
16	Romvest Socodor (R)	34	8	8	18	53	87	−34	32	Relegation to Arad County Championship
17	Avântul Târnova (Note: Avântul Târnova withdrew from the championship.) (R)	34	7	8	19	42	67	−25	29	Relegation to Arad County Championship
18	Petromureș Zădăreni (R)	34	3	2	29	38	117	−79	11	Relegation to Arad County Championship

Rules for classification: 1) Points; 2) Goal difference; 3) Number of goals scored.
(C) Champions; (Q) Qualified for the phase indicated; (R) Relegated

=== Bihor County ===
Pos	Team	Pld	W	D	L	GF	GA	GD	Pts	Qualification or relegation
1	Minerul Șuncuiuș (C, Q)	24	21	3	0	89	10	+79	66	Qualification to promotion play-off
2	Olimpia Salonta	24	15	3	6	54	30	+24	48	
3	Romtrans Oradea	24	14	4	6	58	23	+35	46	
4	Petrolul Suplac	24	11	7	6	55	29	+26	40	
5	INCAST Oradea	24	11	6	7	56	24	+32	39	
6	Blănuri Oradea	24	11	4	9	37	27	+10	37	
7	Oțelul Ștei	24	11	3	10	53	45	+8	36	
8	Arovit Valea lui Mihai	24	9	4	11	44	38	+6	31	
9	Dacia 94 Tinca	24	8	3	13	32	51	−19	27	
10	Bihorul Beiuș	24	7	4	13	22	61	−39	25	
11	Minerul Vadu Crișului	24	7	3	14	38	71	−33	24	
12	Minerul Voivozi	24	7	2	15	47	63	−16	23	
13	Săgeata Crișulului Oradea	24	1	0	23	8	121	−113	3	
14	Victoria Avram Iancu (Note: Victoria Avram Iancu withdrew in the first part of the season and all its results were canceled.) (D)	0	0	0	0	0	0	0	0	Withdrew

Rules for classification: 1) Points; 2) Goal difference; 3) Number of goals scored.
(C) Champions; (D) Disqualified; (Q) Qualified for the phase indicated

=== Caraș-Severin County ===
Pos	Team	Pld	W	D	L	GF	GA	GD	Pts	Qualification or relegation
1	Minerul Moldova Nouă (C, Q)	30	25	0	5	104	19	+85	75	Qualification to promotion play-off
2	Metalul Bocșa	30	22	3	5	113	23	+90	69	
3	Caromet Caransebeș	30	21	2	7	92	29	+63	65	
4	Metalul Oțelu Roșu	30	20	1	9	85	31	+54	61	
5	Arsenal Reșița	30	19	3	8	73	26	+47	60	
6	Muncitorul Reșița	30	17	7	6	78	39	+39	58	
7	Minerul Oravița	30	14	3	13	63	43	+20	45	
8	Minerul Nera Bozovici	30	13	2	15	62	77	−15	41	
9	Mundus Caransebeș	30	11	5	14	43	43	0	38	
10	Minerul Anina	30	12	2	16	59	66	−7	38	
11	Dunărea Moldova Nouă	30	11	4	15	45	60	−15	37	
12	Metalul Topleț	30	9	3	18	46	77	−31	30	
13	Bocșa	30	8	3	19	40	118	−78	27	
14	Forest Olimp Zăvoi	30	8	3	19	40	59	−19	27	
15	Minerul Cozla	30	5	4	21	30	118	−88	19	
16	Minerul Ocna de Fier	30	2	1	27	24	170	−146	7	

Rules for classification: 1) Points; 2) Goal difference; 3) Number of goals scored.
(C) Champions; (Q) Qualified for the phase indicated

=== Covasna County ===
Pos	Team	Pld	W	D	L	GF	GA	GD	Pts	Qualification or relegation
1	Fortyogó Târgu Secuiesc (C, Q)	30	26	2	2	145	20	+125	80	Qualification to promotion play-off
2	Sfântu Gheorghe	30	20	4	6	137	37	+100	64	
3	Avântul Catalina	30	18	1	11	63	44	+19	55	
4	ICB Malnaș	30	16	4	10	81	44	+37	52	
5	Minerul Baraolt	29	14	3	12	103	58	+45	45	
6	Stăruința Cernat	30	14	2	14	63	54	+9	44	
7	Victoria Ozun	29	14	1	14	75	57	+18	43	
8	Perkő Sânzieni	30	13	4	13	56	72	−16	43	
9	PRIM Brăduț	30	12	0	18	56	78	−22	36	
10	Târgu Secuiesc	30	11	2	17	77	101	−24	35	
11	ICB Bixad	30	10	5	15	33	87	−54	35	
12	Bradul Zagon	30	11	2	17	40	102	−62	35	
13	Harghita Aita Mare	30	11	1	18	59	85	−26	34	
14	Carpați Covasna	30	10	3	17	32	70	−38	33	
15	Nemere Ghelința	30	10	4	16	60	78	−18	32 (Note: Nemere Ghelința deducted 2 points.)	
16	Recolta Moacșa (R)	30	8	3	19	51	149	−98	27	Relegation to Covasna County Championship

Rules for classification: 1) Points; 2) Goal difference; 3) Number of goals scored.
(C) Champions; (Q) Qualified for the phase indicated; (R) Relegated

=== Dolj County ===
Pos	Team	Pld	W	D	L	GF	GA	GD	Pts	Qualification or relegation
1	Bere Craiova (C, Q)	34	25	6	3	113	19	+94	81	Qualification to promotion play-off
2	Constructorul Craiova	34	23	3	8	92	34	+58	72	
3	Autobuzul Craiova	34	21	2	11	73	46	+27	65	
4	Dinamo TCIF Craiova	34	18	10	6	80	38	+42	64	
5	Dunărea Calafat	34	18	9	7	71	52	+19	63	
6	Morărit-Panificație Craiova	34	17	7	10	54	28	+26	58	
7	Gaz Metan Ghercești	34	17	5	12	80	51	+29	56	
8	Progresul Băilești	34	16	3	15	53	46	+7	51	
9	Unirea Leamna	34	14	7	13	56	52	+4	49	
10	Tractorul Craiova	34	13	8	13	44	46	−2	47	
11	Victoria Plenița	34	14	5	15	54	61	−7	47	
12	CFR Craiova	34	13	4	17	43	50	−7	43	
13	Armata Craiova	34	10	10	14	43	46	−3	40	
14	PRO GPS Segarcea	34	11	6	17	43	55	−12	39	
15	IUG Craiova (O)	34	9	5	20	34	84	−50	32	Qualification to relegation play-off
16	Chimia Craiova (O)	34	7	10	17	41	72	−31	31	Qualification to relegation play-off
17	Mecanica Filiași (R)	34	5	2	27	47	155	−108	17	Relegation to Dolj County Championship
18	Tractorul Bechet (R)	34	3	2	29	22	107	−85	11	Relegation to Dolj County Championship

Rules for classification: 1) Points; 2) Goal difference; 3) Number of goals scored.
(C) Champions; (O) Play-off winners; (Q) Qualified for the phase indicated; (R) Relegated

Relegation play-off

The 15th and 16th-placed teams of the Divizia D faces the 2nd placed teams from the two series of Dolj County Championship.
The matches was played on 20 May 1998 on neutral ground at Segarcea and Băilești.

Team 1	Score	Team 2
Chimia Craiova	1–1 (a.e.t.) (6–4 p)	Unirea Amărăștii de Jos
IUG Craiova	3–0	Avîntul Țuglui

=== Galați County ===
Pos	Team	Pld	W	D	L	GF	GA	GD	Pts	Qualification or relegation
1	Avântul Liești (C, Q)	26	22	2	2	107	24	+83	68	Qualification to promotion play-off
2	Muncitorul Ghidigeni	26	18	1	7	75	33	+42	55	
3	Șantierul Naval Galați	26	15	7	4	60	18	+42	52	
4	Hidraulic Galați	26	14	7	5	63	34	+29	49	
5	Voința Liești	26	13	4	9	51	44	+7	43	
6	Victoria IUG Galați	26	12	7	7	66	29	+37	43	
7	Bujorii Târgu Bujor	26	12	4	10	60	58	+2	40	
8	Metalosport Galați	26	10	2	14	70	64	+6	32	
9	Zino Tudor Vladimirescu	26	9	4	13	41	76	−35	31	
10	Rapid Șendreni	26	8	4	14	34	55	−21	28	
11	Dunărea Galați II	26	7	5	14	36	62	−26	26	
12	Gloria Ivești	26	7	3	16	35	74	−39	24	
13	Viitorul Umbrărești	26	4	4	18	33	111	−78	16	
14	Victoria TC Galați	26	2	3	21	32	87	−55	9	

Rules for classification: 1) Points; 2) Goal difference; 3) Number of goals scored.
(C) Champions; (Q) Qualified for the phase indicated

=== Giurgiu County ===
Pos	Team	Pld	W	D	L	GF	GA	GD	Pts	Qualification or relegation
1	Petrolul Roata de Jos (C, Q)	26	23	1	2	111	30	+81	70	Qualification to promotion play-off
2	Voința Slobozia	26	16	1	9	72	47	+25	49	
3	Crismi Crevedia	26	14	6	6	70	42	+28	48	
4	Luceafărul Trestieni	26	15	1	10	84	58	+26	46	
5	Piscicola Hobaia	26	14	3	9	79	62	+17	45	
6	Unirea Joița	26	14	2	10	66	52	+14	44	
7	Dunacon Giurgiu	26	13	4	9	66	62	+4	43	
8	Unirea Bolintin Vale	26	13	3	10	68	39	+29	42	
9	Mihai Viteazul Călugăreni	26	12	1	13	64	64	0	37	
10	Nest Clejani	26	5	3	18	35	120	−85	18	
11	Spicul Izvoru (D)	0	0	0	0	0	0	0	0	Withdrew
12	Prodcom Mârșa (D)	0	0	0	0	0	0	0	0	Withdrew
13	Unirea Găujani (D)	0	0	0	0	0	0	0	0	Withdrew
14	Verachim Giurgiu (D)	0	0	0	0	0	0	0	0	Withdrew
15	Avântul Cartojani (D)	0	0	0	0	0	0	0	0	Withdrew
16	Speranța Săbăreni (D)	0	0	0	0	0	0	0	0	Withdrew

Rules for classification: 1) Points; 2) Goal difference; 3) Number of goals scored.
(C) Champions; (D) Disqualified; (Q) Qualified for the phase indicated

=== Harghita County ===
Pos	Team	Pld	W	D	L	GF	GA	GD	Pts	Qualification or relegation
1	Budvar Odorheiu Secuiesc (C, Q)	20	14	4	2	61	18	+43	46	Qualification to promotion play-off
2	Apemin Borsec	20	14	3	3	54	17	+37	45	
3	Minerul Bălan	20	8	5	7	38	26	+12	29	
4	Unirea Cristuru Secuiesc	20	8	2	10	32	40	−8	26	
5	Complexul Gălăuțaș	20	6	3	11	30	39	−9	21	
6	Amilemn Sânsimion	20	1	1	18	5	80	−75	4	

Rules for classification: 1) Points; 2) Goal difference; 3) Number of goals scored.
(C) Champions; (Q) Qualified for the phase indicated

=== Hunedoara County ===
Pos	Team	Pld	W	D	L	GF	GA	GD	Pts	Qualification or relegation
1	Aurul Brad (C, Q)	26	21	1	4	59	27	+32	64	Qualification for promotion play-off
2	Paroșeni Vulcan	26	18	3	5	69	32	+37	57	
3	Dacia Orăștie	26	18	3	5	73	28	+45	57	
4	Victoria 90 Călan	26	15	0	11	62	27	+35	45	
5	CFR Marmosim Simeria	26	12	6	8	51	33	+18	42	
6	Constructorul Hunedoara	26	12	3	11	53	46	+7	39	
7	Metalul Crișcior	26	10	5	11	38	48	−10	35	
8	Minerul Bărbăteni	26	10	5	11	49	52	−3	35	
9	Minerul Teliuc	26	9	6	11	42	39	+3	33	
10	Minerul Aninoasa	26	9	5	12	41	49	−8	32	
11	Minerul Ghelari	26	10	2	14	43	45	−2	32	
12	Minerul Livezeni	26	7	2	17	38	75	−37	23	
13	Casino Ilia	26	5	3	18	31	62	−31	18	
14	Retezatul Hațeg (R)	26	4	0	22	23	109	−86	12	Relegation to Hunedoara County Championship

Rules for classification: 1) Points; 2) Goal difference; 3) Number of goals scored.
(C) Champions; (Q) Qualified for the phase indicated; (R) Relegated

=== Mureș County ===
Pos	Team	Pld	W	D	L	GF	GA	GD	Pts	Qualification or relegation
1	Electromureș Târgu Mureș (C, Q)	26	23	2	1	97	15	+82	71	Qualification to promotion play-off
2	Mureșul Romvelo Luduș	26	21	3	2	94	13	+81	66	
3	Gaz Metan Târgu Mureș	26	13	7	6	57	30	+27	46	
4	Nutrimur Iernut	26	12	7	7	73	46	+27	43	
5	Avântul Miheșu de Câmpie	26	12	2	12	64	56	+8	38	
6	Unirea Ungheni	26	10	8	8	52	49	+3	38	
7	ASA Cetatea Sighișoara	26	11	2	13	52	49	+3	35	
8	ZAMUR Târgu Mureș	26	10	4	12	42	43	−1	34	
9	Foresta Sovata	26	10	3	13	58	64	−6	33	
10	Cetatea Brâncovenești	26	10	1	15	50	61	−11	31	
11	Victoria Sărățeni	26	9	2	15	34	93	−59	29	
12	Matricon Târgu Mureș	26	7	2	17	32	75	−43	23	
13	Frăția Neaua Sângeorgiu de Pădure	26	5	2	19	25	83	−58	17	
14	Oțelul Solovăstru	26	6	1	19	37	90	−53	16 (Note: Oțelul Solovăstru deducted 3 points.)	

Rules for classification: 1) Points; 2) Goal difference; 3) Number of goals scored.
(C) Champions; (Q) Qualified for the phase indicated

=== Neamț County ===
Pos	Team	Pld	W	D	L	GF	GA	GD	Pts	Qualification or relegation
1	Cimentul Bicaz (C, Q)	24	21	2	1	124	19	+105	65	Qualification to promotion play-off
2	Ozana Târgu Neamț	24	19	2	3	98	25	+73	59	
3	Juventus Piatra Neamț	24	15	2	7	71	39	+32	47	
4	Danubiana Roman	24	14	2	8	58	41	+17	44	
5	Azochim Săvinești	24	12	2	10	85	58	+27	38	
6	Hidroconstrucția Poiana Teiului	24	10	3	11	61	47	+14	33	
7	Viitorul AGET Podoleni	24	9	4	11	53	81	−28	31	
8	Siretul Adjudeni	24	9	4	11	46	74	−28	31	
9	Franciscana Roman	24	9	4	11	57	88	−31	31	
10	Olimpia Piatra Neamț	24	8	4	12	55	69	−14	28	
11	Cobzaru Săbăoani	24	5	2	17	47	76	−29	17	
12	Bradul Roznov	24	5	2	17	31	76	−45	17	
13	Recolta Bodești	24	3	1	20	30	143	−113	10	

Rules for classification: 1) Points; 2) Goal difference; 3) Number of goals scored.
(C) Champions; (Q) Qualified for the phase indicated

=== Prahova County ===
Pos	Team	Pld	W	D	L	GF	GA	GD	Pts	Qualification or relegation
1	Chimia Brazi (C, Q)	34	23	8	3	79	21	+58	77	Qualification to promotion play-off
2	Metalul Băicoi	34	23	8	3	71	23	+48	76 (Note: Metalul Băicoi deducted 1 point.)	
3	Conpet Ploiești	34	22	5	7	75	26	+49	71	
4	Rafinăria Steaua Română Câmpina	34	17	5	12	63	38	+25	56	
5	Petrolul Băicoi	34	17	3	14	44	33	+11	54	
6	Petrolul Teleajen Ploiești	34	14	10	10	39	30	+9	52	
7	Hidrojet Breaza	34	15	4	15	66	54	+12	49	
8	Chimistul Valea Călugărească	34	13	9	12	63	42	+21	48	
9	Carpați Sinaia	34	14	4	16	50	53	−3	46	
10	Petrolul Mălăiești	34	15	1	18	41	78	−37	46	
11	Unirea Dealu Mare Urlați	34	14	4	16	41	45	−4	46	
12	Matizol Ploiești	34	13	5	16	45	49	−4	44	
13	Caraimanul Bușteni	34	11	10	13	42	39	+3	43	
14	Minerul Slănic	34	13	3	18	40	69	−29	42	
15	Prahova Argus Ploiești (Note: Prahova Argus Ploiești was spared from relegation due to the promotion of Chimia Brazi in Divizia C.)	34	12	4	18	41	61	−20	40	Spared from relegation
16	Geamuri Boldești-Scăeni (R)	34	9	4	21	35	100	−65	31	Relegation to Prahova County Championship
17	Coruna Câmpina (R)	34	5	11	18	37	65	−28	26	Relegation to Prahova County Championship
18	Vega Ploiești (R)	34	4	6	24	30	76	−46	18	Relegation to Prahova County Championship

Rules for classification: 1) Points; 2) Head-to-head points; 3) Head-to-head goal difference; 4) Head-to-head goals scored; 5) Head-to-head away goals scored; 6) Goal difference; 7) Goals scored.
(C) Champions; (Q) Qualified for the phase indicated; (R) Relegated

=== Sălaj County ===
Pos	Team	Pld	W	D	L	GF	GA	GD	Pts	Qualification or relegation
1	Minerul Șărmășag (C, Q)	26	24	0	2	138	20	+118	72	Qualification to promotion play-off
2	Silvania Cehu Silvaniei	26	21	1	4	106	32	+74	64	
3	Rapid Jibou	26	18	1	7	63	44	+19	55	
4	Tractorul Nușfălău	26	16	4	6	62	37	+25	52	
5	Chimia Zalău	26	17	0	9	73	57	+16	51	
6	Spartac Crasna	26	15	2	9	54	47	+7	47	
7	Minerul Letca	26	13	3	10	52	57	−5	42	
8	Minerul Ip	26	11	3	12	38	43	−5	36	
9	CSS Zalău	26	8	2	16	31	64	−33	26	
10	Minerul Chieșd	26	7	3	16	32	85	−53	24	
11	Someșul Gâlgău	26	6	2	18	48	80	−32	20	
12	Cibela Crișeni	26	5	3	18	33	69	−36	18	
13	Minerul Hida	26	5	2	19	40	89	−49	17	
14	Rapid Almaș	26	3	2	21	27	73	−46	11	

Rules for classification: 1) Points; 2) Goal difference; 3) Number of goals scored.
(C) Champions; (Q) Qualified for the phase indicated

=== Sibiu County ===
Pos	Team	Pld	W	D	L	GF	GA	GD	Pts	Qualification or relegation
1	Record Mediaș (C, Q)	30	23	3	4	101	31	+70	72	Qualification to promotion play-off
2	CFR Retezat PIM Sibiu	30	22	4	4	90	27	+63	70	
3	COMESO Șeica Mare	30	20	2	8	77	36	+41	62	
4	Geromed Mediaș	30	19	4	7	77	30	+47	61	
5	Carpați Mecanica Mârșa	30	19	2	9	85	38	+47	59	
6	Sparta Mediaș	30	18	3	9	81	35	+46	57	
7	Vitrometan Mediaș	30	16	3	11	70	56	+14	51	
8	Incstar Agnita	30	15	4	11	63	50	+13	49	
9	Romanofir Tălmaciu	30	10	5	15	35	61	−26	35	
10	Universitatea Mecasem Sibiu	30	10	3	17	57	59	−2	33	
11	Textila Cisnădie	30	9	5	16	35	55	−20	32	
12	ASA Sibiu	30	9	2	19	42	86	−44	29	
13	Unirea Ocna Sibiului	30	9	1	20	39	85	−46	28	
14	Viitorul Bazna	30	8	4	18	39	77	−38	28	
15	Construcții Sibiu	30	7	3	20	39	83	−44	24	
16	Sticla Avrig	30	2	0	28	23	144	−121	6	

Rules for classification: 1) Points; 2) Head-to-head points; 3) Head-to-head goal difference; 4) Head-to-head goals scored; 5) Head-to-head away goals scored; 6) Goal difference; 7) Goals scored.
(C) Champions; (Q) Qualified for the phase indicated

=== Timiș County ===
Pos	Team	Pld	W	D	L	GF	GA	GD	Pts	Qualification or relegation
1	Obilici Sânmartinu Sârbesc (C, Q)	34	27	1	6	132	32	+100	82	Qualification to promotion play-off
2	Sporting Tabac Timișoara	34	23	6	5	103	24	+79	75	
3	Comtim Azur Șag	34	22	6	6	83	25	+58	72	
4	Timpuri Noi Giarmata	34	22	4	8	84	47	+37	70	
5	Vulturii Mondial Lugoj	34	20	7	7	113	38	+75	67	
6	Comtransport Beregsău Mare	34	16	9	9	73	22	+51	57	
7	Unirea Sânnicolau Mare	34	17	5	12	66	53	+13	56	
8	Steaua Roșie Variaș	34	17	4	13	56	48	+8	55	
9	Unirea Peciu Nou	34	15	6	13	71	50	+21	51	
10	Bancom Comloșu Mare	34	15	5	14	75	62	+13	50	
11	Jimbolia	34	14	6	14	60	51	+9	48	
12	Dacia Timișoara	34	11	10	13	61	49	+12	43	
13	Șoimii Textila Timișoara	34	11	9	14	56	36	+20	42	
14	Laminorul Nădrag	34	12	3	19	60	103	−43	39	
15	Mureșul Cenad	34	8	4	22	49	83	−34	26 (Note: Mureșul Cenad deducted 2 points.)	
16	Mobfrola Timișoara (Note: Tehnolemn Timișoara was renamed as Mobfrola Timișoara, after the first part of the season.) (R)	34	4	5	25	25	94	−69	17	Relegation to Timiș County Championship
17	Flacăra Făget (R)	34	3	2	29	35	190	−155	11	Relegation to Timiș County Championship
18	Recaș (R)	34	2	2	30	23	182	−159	8	Relegation to Timiș County Championship

Rules for classification: 1) points; 2) goal difference; 3) number of goals scored.
(C) Champions; (Q) Qualified for the phase indicated; (R) Relegated

== See also ==
- 1997–98 Divizia A
- 1997–98 Divizia B
- 1997–98 Divizia C
- 1997–98 Cupa României
