= 1976–77 County Championship =

35th season of the Liga IV, the fourth tier of the Romanian football league

Liga IV
- Season: 1976–77

The 1976–77 County Championship was the 35th season of the Liga IV, the fourth tier of the Romanian football league system. The champions of each county association play against one from a neighboring county in a play-off to gain promotion to Divizia C.

== County championships ==
- Alba (AB)
- Arad (AR)
- Argeș (AG)
- Bacău (BC)
- Bihor (BH)
- Bistrița-Năsăud (BN)
- Botoșani (BT)
- Brașov (BV)
- Brăila (BR)
- Bucharest (B)
- Buzău (BZ)
- Caraș-Severin (CS)
- Cluj (CJ)
- Constanța (CT)
- Covasna (CV)
- Dâmbovița (DB)
- Dolj (DJ)
- Galați (GL)
- Gorj (GJ)
- Harghita (HR)
- Hunedoara (HD)
- Ialomița (IL)
- Iași (IS)
- Ilfov (IF)
- Maramureș (MM)
- Mehedinți (MH)
- Mureș (MS)
- Neamț (NT)
- Olt (OT)
- Prahova (PH)
- Satu Mare (SM)
- Sălaj (SJ)
- Sibiu (SB)
- Suceava (SV)
- Teleorman (TR)
- Timiș (TM)
- Tulcea (TL)
- Vaslui (VS)
- Vâlcea (VL)
- Vrancea (VN)

== Promotion play-off ==
Teams promoted to Divizia C without a play-off matches as teams from less represented counties in the third division.

- (AG) Automobilul Curtea de Argeș
- (BN) Hebe Sângeorz-Băi
- (BT) Siretul Bucecea
- (GL) Oțelul Galați
- (IL) Victoria Lehliu
- (SJ) Rapid Jibou
- (VS) Flacăra Murgeni
- (BZ) Petrolul Berca

The matches was played on 10 and 17 July 1977.

Team 1	Agg.	Team 2	1st leg	2nd leg
Minerul Voivozi (BH)	2–4	(CJ) CM Cluj-Napoca	2–1	0–3
Electrica Titu (DB)	3–4	(OT) Electrodul Slatina	3–2	0–2
Oțelul Reghin (MS)	7–6	(AB) ICIM Cugir	5–0	2–6
Libertatea Arad (AR)	2–4	(HD) Minerul Vulcan	2–1	0–3
IUPS Miercurea Ciuc (HR)	7–2	(NT) IJIL Piatra Neamț	6–1	1–1
Mecanizatorul Șimian (MH)	3–2	(VL) Oltul Râmnicu Vâlcea	3–1	0–1
Unirea Gârbovi (IF)	3–3 (2–4 p)	(CT) Chimpex Constanța	2–1	1–2
Minerul Ilba-Seini (MM)	2–0	(SM) Sticla Poiana Codrului	1–0	1–0
Victoria Craiova (DJ)	3–4	(GJ) Constructorul Târgu Jiu	3–2	0–2
Viitorul Hârlău (IS)	0–6	(SV) Zimbrul Suceava	0–4	0–2
Textila Roșiori (TR)	2–6	(B) Mecanică Fină București	2–4	0–2
Petrolul Băicoi (PH)	3–2	(CV) Forestierul Covasna	2–0	1–2
Dinamo Timișoara (TM)	1–2	(CS) Minerul Oravița	0–1	1–1
Aripile Bacău (BC)	3–2	(VN) Rapid Panciu	3–0 (Note: The result of the match Aripile Bacău - Rapid Panciu 2–0 was approved with 3–0. The team from Panciu used a player without the right to play.)	0–2
Carpați Mârșa (SB)	5–2	(BV) IT Brașov	5–1	0–1
Constructorul Brăila (BR)	1–4	(TL) Granitul Babadag	1–0	0–4

== Championships standings ==
=== Arad County ===
Series I

Pos	Team	Pld	W	D	L	GF	GA	GD	Pts	Qualification or relegation
1	Șoimii Pâncota (Q)	26	15	9	2	49	22	+27	39	Qualification to championship final
2	Frontiera Curtici	26	19	1	6	77	34	+43	39	
3	Stăruința Dorobanți	26	15	5	6	54	22	+32	35	
4	Șiriana Șiria	26	11	8	7	53	42	+11	30	
5	Gloria Ineu	26	12	5	9	42	36	+6	29	
6	Indagrara Arad	26	8	9	9	33	32	+1	25	
7	Foresta Arad	26	9	7	10	31	31	0	25	
8	Înfrățirea Iratoșu	26	11	2	13	34	32	+2	24	
9	Foresta Beliu	26	9	6	11	45	54	−9	24	
10	Progresul Pecica	26	9	6	11	27	36	−9	24	
11	Mureșul Arad	26	8	7	11	40	46	−6	23	
12	Viitorul Turnu	26	8	6	12	45	51	−6	22	
13	Voința Macea	26	9	5	12	48	51	−3	19 (Note: Voința Macea deducted 4 points.)	
14	Viitorul Șepreuș	26	0	2	24	28	118	−90	2	

Rules for classification: 1) Points; 2) Goal difference; 3) Number of goals scored.
(Q) Qualified for the phase indicated
Notes:

Series II

Pos	Team	Pld	W	D	L	GF	GA	GD	Pts	Qualification or relegation
1	Libertatea Arad (Q)	26	17	5	4	75	23	+52	39	Qualification to championship final
2	FZ Arad	26	16	4	6	47	20	+27	36	
3	Victoria Ineu	26	14	5	7	61	26	+35	33	
4	Șoimii Lipova	26	13	7	6	52	38	+14	33	
5	Crișana Sebiș	26	12	7	7	49	28	+21	31	
6	Unirea Șofronea	26	13	4	9	64	39	+25	30	
7	Victoria Chișineu-Criș	26	11	5	10	55	49	+6	27	
8	Unirea Sântana	26	12	2	12	42	53	−11	26	
9	Victoria Zăbrani	26	12	1	13	51	54	−3	25	
10	Motorul Arad	26	9	4	13	32	47	−15	22	
11	CFR Gurahonț	26	8	4	14	43	69	−26	20	
12	Unirea Aluniș	26	8	2	16	36	63	−27	18	
13	Viitorul Tisa Nouă	26	5	3	18	31	69	−38	13	
14	Victoria Seleuș	26	4	3	19	32	92	−60	11	

Rules for classification: 1) Points; 2) Goal difference; 3) Number of goals scored.
(Q) Qualified for the phase indicated

Championship final

The matches was played on 19 and 21 June 1977.

Team 1	Agg.	Team 2	1st leg	2nd leg
Șoimii Pâncota	1–5	Libertatea Arad	1–0	0–5

Libertatea Arad won the Arad County Championship and qualify for promotion play-off in Divizia C.

=== Caraș-Severin County ===
Pos	Team	Pld	W	D	L	GF	GA	GD	Pts	Qualification or relegation
1	Minerul Oravița (C, Q)	42	26	8	8	98	18	+80	60	Qualification to promotion play-off
2	Energia Reșița	38	24	4	10	88	47	+41	52	
3	CFR Caransebeș	38	21	6	11	78	56	+22	48	
4	Victoria Caransebeș	38	21	3	14	82	60	+22	45	
5	Electromecanica Reșița	38	16	11	11	66	49	+17	43	
6	CFR Oravița	38	18	6	14	94	55	+39	42	
7	Autoforesta Bocșa	38	17	8	13	59	55	+4	42	
8	CPL Caransebeș	38	14	12	12	65	42	+23	40	
9	Metalul Topleț	38	15	7	16	67	67	0	37	
10	ITA Caransebeș	38	11	15	12	44	58	−14	37	
11	Minerul Ocna de Fier	38	15	6	17	60	57	+3	36	
12	Muncitorul Reșița	38	13	9	16	58	49	+9	35	
13	Foresta Zăvoi	38	17	1	20	81	77	+4	35	
14	ATA Oravița	38	14	5	19	52	74	−22	33	
15	Siderurgistul Reșița	38	12	8	18	58	55	+3	32	
16	Recolta Berzovia	38	14	3	21	56	93	−37	31	
17	Bistra Glimboca	38	12	7	19	44	93	−49	31	
18	Minerul Dognecea	38	12	7	19	56	110	−54	31	
19	Metalul Caransebeș	38	12	4	22	55	81	−26	28	
20	Metalul Anina	38	10	2	26	38	103	−65	22	

Rules for classification: 1) Points; 2) Goal difference; 3) Number of goals scored.
(C) Champions; (Q) Qualified for the phase indicated

=== Cluj County ===
Pos	Team	Pld	W	D	L	GF	GA	GD	Pts	Qualification or relegation
1	CM Cluj-Napoca (C, Q)	30	21	4	5	87	26	+61	46	Qualification to promotion play-off
2	Izolatorul Turda	30	18	4	8	53	31	+22	40	
3	Vlădeasa Huedin	30	15	8	7	72	36	+36	38	
4	Electrometal Cluj-Napoca	30	15	8	7	69	37	+32	38	
5	Unirea Florești	30	12	10	8	43	39	+4	34	
6	Minerul Aghireș	30	12	10	8	41	38	+3	34	
7	Vulturii Mintiu Gherlii	30	13	7	10	52	55	−3	33	
8	CFR Turda	30	12	9	9	53	33	+20	33	
9	Arieșul Câmpia Turzii	30	14	4	12	44	41	+3	32	
10	CFR Dej	30	11	6	13	38	37	+1	28	
11	Someșul Bonțida	30	10	7	13	40	55	−15	27	
12	Motorul URA Cluj-Napoca	30	9	7	14	36	51	−15	25	
13	Dinamo Cluj-Napoca	30	8	7	15	34	49	−15	23	
14	Flacăra Cluj-Napoca	30	7	6	17	35	68	−33	20	
15	Steaua Roșie Iclod	30	6	5	19	31	67	−36	17	
16	Libertatea Cluj-Napoca	30	2	6	22	17	78	−61	10	

Rules for classification: 1) Points; 2) Goal difference; 3) Number of goals scored.
(C) Champions; (Q) Qualified for the phase indicated

=== Dolj County ===
Series I

Pos	Team	Pld	W	D	L	GF	GA	GD	Pts	Qualification or relegation
1	Victoria Craiova (Q)	28	24	3	1	108	12	+96	51	Qualification to championship final
2	Jiul TCIF Craiova	28	22	4	2	85	22	+63	48	
3	Victoria Bratovoiești	28	16	5	7	82	43	+39	37	
4	Progresul Radovan	28	13	8	7	66	37	+29	34	
5	Avântul Ișalnița	28	16	2	10	70	46	+24	34	
6	Știința Constructorul Craiova	28	16	2	10	55	52	+3	34	
7	Fulgerul Mârșani	28	11	7	10	55	57	−2	29	
8	Progresul Cârcea	28	11	3	14	66	57	+9	25	
9	Victoria Celaru	28	11	3	14	55	57	−2	25	
10	Viitorul Terpezița	28	10	4	14	44	71	−27	24	
11	Chimia Craiova	28	9	5	14	48	61	−13	23	
12	Unirea Sărbătoarea	28	10	2	16	51	90	−39	22	
13	Autotransport Craiova	28	6	2	20	31	89	−58	14	
14	Avântul Filiași	28	5	3	20	29	64	−35	13	
15	Tractorul Predești	28	1	1	26	12	105	−93	3	
16	Viitorul Coșoveni (Note: Viitorul Coșoveni was excluded in the first part of the season and all its results were canceled.) (D)	0	0	0	0	0	0	0	0	Withdrew

Rules for classification: 1) Points; 2) Goal difference; 3) Number of goals scored.
(D) Disqualified; (Q) Qualified for the phase indicated
Notes:

Series II

Pos	Team	Pld	W	D	L	GF	GA	GD	Pts	Qualification or relegation
1	Steagul Roșu Plenița (Q)	30	19	7	4	78	35	+43	45	Qualification to championship final
2	Unirea Goicea Mare	30	15	9	6	60	27	+33	39	
3	Recolta Măceșu de Jos	30	17	4	9	80	33	+47	38	
4	Progresul Segarcea	30	15	6	9	65	44	+21	36	
5	Progresul Goicea Mică	30	15	5	10	71	42	+29	35	
6	Recolta Ostroveni	30	16	2	12	68	56	+12	34	
7	Avântul Bârca	30	15	4	11	48	50	−2	34	
8	Eruga Siliștea Crucii	30	13	6	11	75	67	+8	32	
9	Unirea Tricolor Dăbuleni	30	13	5	12	59	58	+1	31	
10	Dunărea Bistreț	30	10	6	14	57	57	0	26	
11	Fulgerul Maglavit	30	12	1	17	54	78	−24	25	
12	Recolta Dunăreni	30	11	1	18	47	70	−23	23	
13	Desnățuiul Giurgița	30	9	4	17	49	75	−26	22	
14	Luceafărul Ghidici	30	10	1	19	41	86	−45	21	
15	Electrica Băilești	30	9	1	20	39	77	−38	19	
16	Recolta Urzicuța	30	8	2	20	34	76	−42	18	

Rules for classification: 1) Points; 2) Goal difference; 3) Number of goals scored.
(Q) Qualified for the phase indicated

Championship final

The matches was played on 5 and 9 June 1977.

Team 1	Agg.	Team 2	1st leg	2nd leg
Steagul Roșu Plenița	0–2	Victoria Craiova	0–0	0–2

Victoria Craiova won the Dolj County Championship and qualify for promotion play-off in Divizia C.

=== Harghita County ===
Pos	Team	Pld	W	D	L	GF	GA	GD	Pts	Qualification or relegation
1	IUPS Miercurea Ciuc (C, Q)	34	25	4	5	118	20	+98	54	Qualification to promotion play-off
2	Unirea Cristuru Secuiesc	34	23	5	6	83	31	+52	51	
3	Metalul Vlăhița	34	21	4	9	88	38	+50	46	
4	Complexul Gălăuțaș	34	18	6	10	78	51	+27	42	
5	Explorarea Bălan	34	18	6	10	68	48	+20	42	
6	ASM Odorheiu Secuiesc	34	17	3	14	68	57	+11	37	
7	Bastionul Lăzarea	34	17	1	16	55	65	−10	35	
8	Metalul Gheorgheni	34	14	4	16	78	66	+12	32	
9	Flamura Roșie Sânsimion	34	14	4	16	64	67	−3	32	
10	Minerul Miercurea Ciuc	34	14	4	16	58	63	−5	32	
11	Rapid Porumbenii Mari	34	14	2	18	60	96	−36	30	
12	Minerul Lueta	34	10	9	15	54	62	−8	29	
13	Mobila Ditrău	34	11	6	17	45	77	−32	28	
14	Apemin Borsec (Note: Apemin Borsec was excluded from championship.)	34	13	2	19	68	101	−33	28	
15	Bradul Hodoșa	34	9	9	16	44	64	−20	27	
16	Șoimii Băile Tușnad	34	10	6	18	52	90	−38	26	
17	Unirea Tulgheș	34	9	3	22	41	77	−36	21	
18	Mureșul Suseni	34	8	4	22	51	100	−49	20	

Rules for classification: 1) Points; 2) Goal difference; 3) Number of goals scored.
(C) Champions; (Q) Qualified for the phase indicated

=== Hunedoara County ===
Pos	Team	Pld	W	D	L	GF	GA	GD	Pts	Qualification or relegation
1	Minerul Vulcan (C, Q)	28	19	4	5	79	26	+53	42	Qualification to promotion play-off
2	Explorări Deva	28	18	3	7	78	33	+45	39	
3	Aurul Certej	28	18	3	7	62	27	+35	39	
4	Minerul Uricani	28	15	3	10	70	49	+21	33	
5	Autotransport Hațeg	28	13	4	11	61	46	+15	30	
6	EGCL Hunedoara	28	13	3	12	43	44	−1	29	
7	Minerul Aninoasa	28	13	3	12	43	48	−5	29	
8	Metalul Crișcior	28	10	8	10	38	37	+1	28	
9	IMC Bârcea	28	10	5	13	47	56	−9	25	
10	Energia Paroșeni	28	10	4	14	49	75	−26	24	
11	Sportul Studențesc Hunedoara	28	9	5	14	51	49	+2	23	
12	Constructorul Hunedoara	28	8	7	13	51	55	−4	23	
13	Parângul Lonea	28	10	3	15	34	74	−40	23	
14	CFR Petroșani	28	7	7	14	46	74	−28	21	
15	Preparatorul Petrila	28	3	4	21	29	94	−65	10	

Rules for classification: 1) Points; 2) Goal difference; 3) Number of goals scored.
(C) Champions; (Q) Qualified for the phase indicated

=== Prahova County ===
Pos	Team	Pld	W	D	L	GF	GA	GD	Pts	Qualification or relegation
1	Petrolul Băicoi (C, Q)	30	20	7	3	66	21	+45	47	Qualification to promotion play-off
2	Tricolorul Breaza	30	20	6	4	73	21	+52	46	
3	Electromotor Câmpina	30	17	7	6	60	34	+26	41	
4	Minerul Filipeștii de Pădure	30	15	9	6	52	26	+26	39	
5	Chimistul Valea Călugărească	30	15	7	8	56	40	+16	37	
6	IUC Ploiești	30	14	8	8	43	33	+10	36	
7	Flamura Roșie Dorobanțul	30	14	5	11	37	33	+4	33	
8	ICIM Câmpina	30	11	9	10	48	42	+6	31	
9	Dacia Ploiești	30	11	7	12	41	43	−2	29	
10	Rapid Mizil	30	9	7	14	39	45	−6	25	
11	Carotajul Ploiești	30	10	4	16	43	67	−24	24	
12	PECO Ploiești	30	7	9	14	23	43	−20	23	
13	Geamul Boldești-Scăieni	30	9	3	18	32	52	−20	21	
14	Metalul Câmpina	30	6	8	16	38	53	−15	20	
15	Petrolul Urlați (Note: Petrolul Urlați was spared from relegation due to the promotion of Petrolul Băicoi in Divizia C.)	30	8	2	20	27	74	−47	18	Spared from relegation
16	Feroemail Ploiești (R)	30	3	3	24	32	83	−51	9	Relegation to Prahova County Championship II

Rules for classification: 1) Points; 2) Goal difference; 3) Number of goals scored.
(C) Champions; (Q) Qualified for the phase indicated; (R) Relegated

=== Satu Mare County ===
Pos	Team	Pld	W	D	L	GF	GA	GD	Pts	Qualification or relegation
1	Sticla Poiana Codrului (C, Q)	30	20	2	8	79	43	+36	42	Qualification to promotion play-off
2	Stăruința Berveni	30	16	9	5	80	46	+34	41	
3	Minerul Turț	30	16	6	8	63	34	+29	38	
4	Lemnul Satu Mare	30	15	7	8	48	29	+19	37	
5	Unirea Tășnad	30	15	6	9	80	46	+34	36	
6	Recolta Urziceni	30	15	6	9	71	51	+20	36	
7	Recolta Căpleni	30	13	8	9	52	46	+6	34	
8	Recolta Dorolț	30	13	5	12	51	48	+3	31	
9	Victoria Petrești	30	9	11	10	73	78	−5	29	
10	Constructorul Satu Mare	30	11	5	14	60	70	−10	27	
11	Recolta Sanislău	30	10	6	14	41	56	−15	26	
12	Someșul Odoreu	30	10	5	15	41	70	−29	25	
13	Forestiera Bixad	30	10	4	16	62	76	−14	24	
14	Mobila Satu Mare	30	10	3	17	57	69	−12	23	
15	Turul Micula	30	7	5	18	36	73	−37	19	
16	Someșul Cărășeu	30	3	6	21	36	101	−65	12	

Rules for classification: 1) Points; 2) Goal difference; 3) Number of goals scored.
(C) Champions; (Q) Qualified for the phase indicated

=== Sălaj County ===
Pos	Team	Pld	W	D	L	GF	GA	GD	Pts	Qualification or relegation
1	Rapid Jibou (C, Q)	30	27	1	2	174	33	+141	55	Qualification to promotion play-off
2	Minerul Sărmășag	30	23	4	3	90	28	+62	50	
3	Energia Sânmihaiu Almașului	30	19	6	5	90	40	+50	44	
4	Progresul Bălan	30	17	3	10	75	64	+11	37	
5	Unirea Hida	30	16	3	11	71	54	+17	35	
6	Minerul Cuciulat	30	15	2	13	75	73	+2	32	
7	Silvania Cehu Silvaniei	30	14	3	13	72	54	+18	31	
8	Minerul Surduc	30	13	5	12	77	74	+3	31	
9	Elcond Zalău	30	10	7	13	62	66	−4	27	
10	Năzuința Tihău	30	11	3	16	61	83	−22	25	
11	Olimpic Bocșa	30	10	4	16	43	68	−25	24	
12	Drum Nou Dragu	30	10	1	19	46	83	−37	21	
13	Unirea Gârbou	30	8	3	19	41	94	−53	19	
14	Unirea Hereclean	30	8	2	20	27	81	−54	18	
15	Gloria Pericei	30	7	4	19	36	96	−60	18	
16	Constructorul Zalău	30	5	1	24	21	76	−55	11	

Rules for classification: 1) Points; 2) Goal difference; 3) Number of goals scored.
(C) Champions; (Q) Qualified for the phase indicated

=== Sibiu County ===
Pos	Team	Pld	W	D	L	GF	GA	GD	Pts	Qualification or relegation
1	Carpați Mârșa (C, Q)	34	25	6	3	110	21	+89	56	Qualification to promotion play-off
2	Construcții Sibiu	34	23	7	4	103	27	+76	53	
3	Metalul IO Sibiu	34	22	6	6	80	29	+51	50	
4	Vitrometan Mediaș	34	21	6	7	58	28	+30	48	
5	ELCA Mediaș	34	17	7	10	53	36	+17	41	
6	Carbosin Copșa Mică	34	16	6	12	53	48	+5	38	
7	CSU Sibiu	34	16	5	13	70	62	+8	37	
8	ASA Sibiu	34	16	4	14	58	58	0	36	
9	Record Mediaș	34	13	8	13	49	42	+7	34	
10	Unirea Ocna Sibiului	34	14	6	14	53	53	0	34	
11	CFR Sibiu	34	13	6	15	44	52	−8	32	
12	Textila Mediaș	34	10	11	13	38	49	−11	31	
13	Metalurgica Sibiu	34	11	8	15	47	53	−6	30	
14	Unirea Tălmaciu	34	13	2	19	54	60	−6	28	
15	Gloria Dumbrăveni	34	7	9	18	41	73	−32	23	
16	Electrica Sibiu	34	8	2	24	38	103	−65	18	
17	Sparta Mediaș	34	5	3	26	32	95	−63	13	
18	Avântul Dârlos	34	4	2	28	22	114	−92	10	

Rules for classification: 1) Points; 2) Goal difference; 3) Number of goals scored.
(C) Champions; (Q) Qualified for the phase indicated

=== Suceava County ===
Pos	Team	Pld	W	D	L	GF	GA	GD	Pts	Qualification or relegation
1	Zimbrul Suceava (C, Q)	32	22	5	5	98	39	+59	49	Qualification to promotion play-off
2	Siretul Dolhasca	32	19	5	8	74	45	+29	43	
3	Bradul Vama	32	19	4	9	93	43	+50	42	
4	Recolta Bosanci	32	18	5	9	61	34	+27	41	
5	Fuiorul Cornu Luncii	32	16	6	10	86	53	+33	38	
6	Avântul Gălănești	32	14	8	10	73	43	+30	36	
7	Forestierul Falcău	32	15	6	11	77	56	+21	36	
8	Avântul Todirești	32	15	4	13	80	58	+22	34	
9	Bistrița Broșteni	32	16	1	15	78	69	+9	33	
10	Unirea Siret	32	15	2	15	54	63	−9	32	
11	Recolta Fântânele	32	15	1	16	51	71	−20	31	
12	Locomotiva Dornești	32	12	6	14	48	68	−20	30	
13	Viitorul Liteni	32	10	5	17	45	68	−23	25	
14	Progresul Rădăuți	32	9	4	19	41	89	−48	22	
15	Flacăra Vicovu de Jos	32	9	3	20	52	99	−47	21	
16	Dumbrava Dumbrăveni	32	7	5	20	52	88	−36	19	
17	Victoria Solca	32	3	6	23	27	104	−77	12	
18	Scânteia Prelipca (D)	0	0	0	0	0	0	0	0	Excluded

Rules for classification: 1) Points; 2) Goal difference; 3) Number of goals scored.
(C) Champions; (D) Disqualified; (Q) Qualified for the phase indicated

=== Timiș County ===
Series I

Pos	Team	Pld	W	D	L	GF	GA	GD	Pts	Qualification or relegation
1	Dinamo Timișoara (Q)	34	24	4	6	88	37	+51	52	Qualification to championship final
2	Bega Belinț	34	19	5	10	80	48	+32	43	
3	Comerțul Lugoj	34	20	2	12	71	44	+27	42	
4	Modern Timișoara	34	17	8	9	49	34	+15	42	
5	Auto Timișoara	34	17	5	12	68	33	+35	39	
6	Electrobanat Timișoara	34	14	7	13	53	39	+14	35	
7	Șoimii Buziaș	34	14	6	14	68	60	+8	34	
8	SC Buziaș	34	12	9	13	52	50	+2	33	
9	Timișul Șag	34	13	7	14	47	56	−9	33	
10	Șoimii Timișoara	34	12	7	15	54	51	+3	31	
11	Avântul Chizătău	34	13	4	17	67	74	−7	30	
12	Înainte Moșnița	34	12	6	16	40	60	−20	30	
13	Flacăra Făget	34	12	5	17	48	62	−14	29	
14	Chimia Margina	34	12	4	18	44	67	−23	28	
15	Victoria Carani	34	11	6	17	38	64	−26	28	
16	Constructorul Lugoj	34	10	8	16	40	68	−28	28	
17	Avântul Topolovăț	34	10	8	16	46	85	−39	28	
18	Tehnolemn Timișoara	34	12	3	19	58	79	−21	27	

Rules for classification: 1) Points; 2) Goal difference; 3) Number of goals scored.
(Q) Qualified for the phase indicated

Series II

Pos	Team	Pld	W	D	L	GF	GA	GD	Pts	Qualification or relegation
1	Furnirul Deta (Q)	34	22	7	5	76	24	+52	51	Qualification to championship final
2	Obilici Sânmartinu Sârbesc	34	21	7	6	67	37	+30	49	
3	Flacăra Parța	34	19	5	10	81	46	+35	43	
4	13 Construcții Timișoara	34	18	7	9	76	47	+29	43	
5	Progresul Gătaia	34	17	5	12	62	58	+4	39	
6	IAEM Timișoara	34	14	9	11	53	40	+13	37	
7	Voința Șandra	34	15	4	15	54	53	+1	34	
8	Checeana Checea	34	14	6	14	70	73	−3	34	
9	Mănușarul Timișoara	34	14	4	16	47	55	−8	32	
10	Voința Sânnicolau Mare	34	12	7	15	48	52	−4	31	
11	Unirea Peciu Nou	34	13	4	17	58	68	−10	30	
12	Unirea Breștea	34	12	6	16	51	77	−26	30	
13	Pobeda Dudeștii Vechi	34	13	3	18	62	58	+4	29	
14	Progresul Ciacova	34	13	3	18	63	95	−32	29	
15	Textila Timișoara	34	10	8	16	52	47	+5	28	
16	Avântul Periam	34	11	4	19	57	75	−18	26	
17	FZ Banatul Timișoara	34	10	4	20	54	84	−30	24	
18	Recolta Nerău	34	11	1	22	44	86	−42	23	

Rules for classification: 1) Points; 2) Goal difference; 3) Number of goals scored.
(Q) Qualified for the phase indicated

Championship final

The matches was played on 23 and 26 June 1977.

Team 1	Agg.	Team 2	1st leg	2nd leg
Dinamo Timișoara	4–4 (Note: Dinamo Timișoara won on the away goals rule.)	Furnirul Deta	3–0	1–4

Dinamo Timișoara won the Timiș County Championship and qualify for promotion play-off in Divizia C.

== See also ==
- 1976–77 Divizia A
- 1976–77 Divizia B
- 1976–77 Divizia C
- 1976–77 Cupa României
