= ATCS Sparta Râmnicu Vâlcea =

Sparta Râmnicu Vâlcea
- Full name: Asociația de Tineret Club Sportiv; Sparta Râmnicu Vâlcea
- Nicknames: Spartanii (The Spartans); Vâlcenii (The people from Vâlcea)
- Short name: Sparta
- Founded: 2018; 8 years ago
- Dissolved: 2025; 1 year ago
- Ground: Treapt (temporary)
- Capacity: 1,500
- 2024–25: Liga III, Seria VIII, 10th (relegated)
Home colours	Away colours	Third colours

Asociația de Tineret Club Sportiv Sparta Râmnicu Vâlcea, commonly known as Sparta Râmnicu Vâlcea, was a Romanian football club based in Râmnicu Vâlcea, Vâlcea County, which last played in Liga III, the third tier of the Romanian football.

== History ==
Sparta Râmnicu Vâlcea was established in 2018 as a youth academy by Romeo Chelcea, Iulian Dincă, Flavius Ionescu and Marius Voican, and activated only at youth level in its first three years.

In the 2021–22 season, the club enrolled its seniors team in the Liga IV – Vâlcea County and finished in 2nd place with 66 points, five points behind Cozia Călimănești.

In the following season the club finished again 2nd place, having the same amount of points with fellow citizens SCM Râmnicu Vâlcea, in which SCM won the league.

In the 2023–24 season the club has won the league with 83 points, 3 points ahead of Păușești Otăsău. The club also beat Iris Titulescu, Olt County champions, beating them 5–1 on aggregate.

== Honours ==
Liga IV – Vâlcea County

- Winners (1): 2023–24
- Runners–up (2): 2021–22, 2022–23

Cupa României – Vâlcea County

- Winners (1): 2020–21

== League history ==
Season	Tier	Division	Place	Notes	Cupa României
2024–25	3	Liga III (Seria VIII)	10th	Relegated	

Season	Tier	Division	Place	Notes	Cupa României
2023–24	4	Liga IV (VL)	1st (C)	Promoted	
