= Ciprian Dinu =

Romanian footballer

Personal information
- Date of birth: 27 May 1982 (age 44)
- Place of birth: Focșani, Romania
- Height: 1.82 m (6 ft 0 in)
- Position: Centre back

Team information
- Current team: Flacăra Horezu
- Number: 23

Senior career*
Years	Team	Apps	(Gls)
2002–2005	Unirea Focșani	67	(2)
2005–2008	Jiul Petroșani	78	(3)
2008–2010	Râmnicu Vâlcea	61	(5)
2010–2011	Săgeata Năvodari	17	(0)
2011–2014	Botoșani	66	(4)
2015	Caransebeș	11	(2)
2015–2016	Inter Olt Slatina	15	(1)
2016	Sporting Turnu Măgurele	8	(0)
2016–2017	Posada Perișani	17	(2)
2017–2020	Flacăra Horezu	31	(3)
Total		371	(22)

Managerial career
- 2020–: Ciprian Dinu Academy
- * Club domestic league appearances and goals as of 30 April 2021

Ciprian Dinu (born 27 May 1982) is a Romanian footballer who plays for Liga IV club Flacăra Horezu.

== Career ==
Dinu began playing football for Unirea Focșani in Liga II. He joined CS Jiul Petroșani in July 2005 and made 47 Liga I appearances for the club.

He was named captain at Jiul Petroșani, but left the club on a free transfer after playing one season in Liga II. The 26-year-old joined Liga II side CSM Râmnicu Vâlcea on a two-year contract. Dinu played one season with Râmnicu Vâlcea, becoming the team captain, but the club could not afford his wages and terminated his contract in July 2009.

In 2011, he joined FC Botoșani.
