= Samson Nwabueze =

Nigerian footballer

Personal information
- Date of birth: 20 April 1988 (age 38)
- Place of birth: Lagos, Nigeria
- Height: 1.77 m (5 ft 10 in)
- Position: Defender

Team information
- Current team: Vulturii Fărcășești
- Number: 5

Youth career
- CASA Academy Lagos

Senior career*
Years	Team	Apps	(Gls)
2008	Știința Bacău	15	(0)
2009–2010	Tricolorul Breaza	33	(0)
2010	Politehnica Iași	1	(0)
2011–2012	Callatis Mangalia	20	(0)
2012–2013	Damila Măciuca	22	(0)
2013–2017	Râmnicu Vâlcea	75	(0)
2017	→ Pandurii Târgu Jiu (loan)	13	(0)
2017	Academica Clinceni	19	(0)
2018–2020	Flacăra Horezu	40	(2)
2020	Turris Turnu Măgurele	3	(0)
2020–2023	Viitorul Dăești	61	(4)
2023–2024	Flacăra Horezu	15	(1)
2024–	Vulturii Fărcășești	15	(2)
- * Club domestic league appearances and goals as of 18:29, 5 January 2025 (UTC)

Samson Nwabueze (born 20 April 1988) is a Nigerian professional footballer who plays as a defender for Vulturii Fărcășești.

At the professional level, he has played only in Romania, mainly with Liga II teams, namely Știința Bacău, Tricolorul Breaza, Callatis Mangalia, Damila Măciuca and Râmnicu Vâlcea. After almost 10 years in the country, Nwabueze finally made his Liga I debut with Pandurii Târgu Jiu on 13 February 2017, in a match against Viitorul Constanța.
