= 2024–25 Liga III =

Liga III
- Season: 2024–25
- All statistics correct as of 24 June 2023.

The 2024–25 Liga III was the 69th season of Liga III, the third tier of the Romanian football league system. The season began on 30 August 2024 and concluded on 4 June 2025 with the second round of the promotion play-off.

The format was maintained with ten series of ten teams each, with each series played in a double round-robin format before being split into play-off and play-out groups. At the end of the regular season, a two-round promotion play-off system was held, in which the top two teams from each series qualified and competed in paired groups (1–2, 3–4, 5–6, 7–8, 9–10) to determine the five teams promoted to Liga II. The bottom two teams from each series, along with the lowest-ranked 8th-placed team from the special ranking, were relegated to Liga IV.

== Team changes ==
Promoted to Liga II

- Metalul Buzău – ended a seven-year stay.
- Afumați – ended a six-year stay.
- Câmpulung Muscel – ended a two-year stay.
- Bihor Oradea – ended a two-year stay.
- Unirea Ungheni – ended a four-year stay.
- Focșani – ended a seven-year stay.

Relegated from Liga II

- Unirea Dej – returned after three years.
- Tunari – returned after one year.
- Alexandria – returned after one year.
- Progresul Spartac București – returned after six years.

Promoted from Liga IV

- USV Iași – debut.
- Șoimii Gura Humorului – debut.
- Ceahlăul Piatra Neamț II
- Diosig Bihardiószeg – debut.
- Vulturul Mintiu Gherlii – debut.
- CIL Blaj
- Gheorgheni – after a twenty-two-year absence.
- Vulturii Fărcășești – debut.
- Timișul Șag – debut.
- Viitorul Arad – debut.
- Sparta Râmnicu Vâlcea – debut.
- Speed Academy Pitești – debut.
- Urban Titu – after a seven-year absence.
- ACS FC Dinamo București – debut.
- Fetești – after a two-year absence.
- Băicoi – debut.
- Adjud – after a twenty-one-year absence.
- Medgidia – after a four-year absence.

Relegated to Liga IV

- Foresta Suceava (excluded) – ended a six-year stay.
- Viitorul Darabani (excluded) – ended a two-year stay.
- Viitorul Șuțești – ended a one-year stay.
- Voluntari II – ended a nine-year stay.
- Cozia Călimănești – ended a two-year stay.
- Turceni – ended a one-year stay.
- FCU 1948 Craiova II – ended a one-year stay.
- Socodor – ended a one-year stay.
- ACB Ineu – ended a two-year stay.
- Industria Galda – ended a one-year stay.
- Minerul Ocna Dej – ended a four-year stay.

=== Other changes ===
- The promoted side Oașul Negrești-Oaș, Iernut and Viitorul Cireșu declined promotion.
- Viitorul Ianca, Hamangia Baia, Flacăra Horezu, Universitatea Craiova II, Voința Lupac, Deva, Viitorul Șimian, Phoenix Buziaș, Șoimii Lipova and Victoria Carei withdrew.
- Voința Limpeziș, Progresul Fundulea, SR Brașov, Ciucaș Tărlungeni, Sănătatea Cluj, Tricolorul Breaza, Păulești, Petrolul Potcoava and Viitorul Cluj were spared from relegation.
- Petrolul Ploiești II, Sport Team București, Ștefănești, Codlea, Minerul Lupeni were admitted to fill the vacancy places.
- Viitorul Curița was renamed Viitorul Onești.
- Rapid Brodoc was moved to Dorohoi and renamed Gloria Ultra.

== League map ==
Locations of Liga III clubs by series
Seria I Seria II Seria III Seria IV Seria V Seria VI Seria VII Seria VIII Seria IX Seria X
Locations of Liga III clubs from Bucharest and the vicinity
Seria III Seria IV Seria V

== Regular season ==
=== Series I ===
Pos	Team	Pld	W	D	L	GF	GA	GD	Pts	Qualification
1	FC Bacău	18	14	2	2	50	11	+39	44	Qualification to Play-Off round
2	Știința Miroslava	18	11	4	3	55	25	+30	37	Qualification to Play-Off round
3	CSM Bacău	18	10	3	5	25	23	+2	33	Qualification to Play-Off round
4	Gloria Ultra	18	8	6	4	26	12	+14	30 (Note: Ranked on head-to-head points: Gloria Ultra (4); CSM Vaslui (1).)	Qualification to Play-Off round
5	Vaslui	18	9	3	6	35	32	+3	30	Qualification to Play-Out round
6	Bucovina Rădăuți	18	7	4	7	20	26	−6	25	Qualification to Play-Out round
7	Șomuz Fălticeni	18	4	6	8	17	28	−11	18	Qualification to Play-Out round
8	Șoimii Gura Humorului	18	3	5	10	17	35	−18	14	Qualification to Play-Out round
9	USV Iași	18	3	3	12	19	44	−25	12	Qualification to Play-Out round
10	Ceahlăul Piatra Neamț II	18	2	2	14	10	38	−28	8	Qualification to Play-Out round

Source: FRF (in Romanian)
Rules for classification: 1) Points; 2) Head-to-head points; 3) Head-to-head goal difference; 4) Head-to-head goals scored;
5) Head-to-head away goals scored; 6) Goal difference; 7) Goals scored; 8) Play-off.

=== Series II ===
Pos	Team	Pld	W	D	L	GF	GA	GD	Pts	Qualification
1	Sporting Liești	18	13	3	2	41	14	+27	42	Qualification to Play-Off round
2	Unirea Braniștea	18	12	4	2	45	12	+33	40	Qualification to Play-Off round
3	KSE Târgu Secuiesc	18	11	2	5	34	22	+12	35	Qualification to Play-Off round
4	Aerostar Bacău	18	11	1	6	37	25	+12	34	Qualification to Play-Off round
5	Sepsi OSK II	18	9	1	8	25	19	+6	28	Qualification to Play-Out round
6	Râmnicu Sărat	18	7	3	8	18	28	−10	24	Qualification to Play-Out round
7	Adjud	18	5	3	10	25	31	−6	18	Qualification to Play-Out round
8	Viitorul Onești	18	4	4	10	20	36	−16	16	Qualification to Play-Out round
9	Dacia Unirea Brăila	18	3	5	10	18	35	−17	14	Qualification to Play-Out round
10	Voința Limpeziș	18	2	0	16	7	48	−41	−12 (Note: Voința Limpeziș were deducted 6 points for fielding an ineligible player, then withdrew from the competition, with all their second-half matches recorded as 0–3 losses.)	Qualification to Play-Out round

Source: FRF (in Romanian)
Rules for classification: 1) Points; 2) Head-to-head points; 3) Head-to-head goal difference; 4) Head-to-head goals scored;
5) Head-to-head away goals scored; 6) Goal difference; 7) Goals scored; 8) Play-off.

=== Series III ===
Pos	Team	Pld	W	D	L	GF	GA	GD	Pts	Qualification
1	Popești-Leordeni	18	12	5	1	37	11	+26	41	Qualification to Play-Off round
2	Recolta Gheorghe Doja	18	9	5	4	34	22	+12	32	Qualification to Play-Off round
3	Dunărea Călărași	18	10	2	6	21	20	+1	32	Qualification to Play-Off round
4	Progresul Fundulea	18	9	2	7	28	19	+9	29	Qualification to Play-Off round
5	Înainte Modelu	18	8	4	6	31	22	+9	28	Qualification to Play-Out round
6	Agricola Borcea	18	8	3	7	18	22	−4	27	Qualification to Play-Out round
7	Gloria Băneasa	18	7	4	7	23	22	+1	25	Qualification to Play-Out round
8	Axiopolis Cernavodă	18	5	4	9	22	31	−9	19	Qualification to Play-Out round
9	Medgidia	18	3	6	9	21	29	−8	15	Qualification to Play-Out round
10	Fetești	18	1	1	16	8	45	−37	4	Qualification to Play-Out round

Source: FRF (in Romanian)
Rules for classification: 1) Points; 2) Head-to-head points; 3) Head-to-head goal difference; 4) Head-to-head goals scored;
5) Head-to-head away goals scored; 6) Goal difference; 7) Goals scored; 8) Play-off.

=== Series IV ===
Pos	Team	Pld	W	D	L	GF	GA	GD	Pts	Qualification
1	Alexandria	18	11	5	2	37	11	+26	38	Qualification to Play-Off round
2	Progresul Spartac București	18	12	2	4	24	12	+12	38	Qualification to Play-Off round
3	Dinamo București	18	11	2	5	35	21	+14	35	Qualification to Play-Off round
4	Vedița Colonești	18	7	6	5	29	18	+11	27	Qualification to Play-Off round
5	Oltul Curtișoara	18	7	5	6	24	19	+5	26	Qualification to Play-Out round
6	Dunărea Giurgiu	18	6	5	7	17	25	−8	23	Qualification to Play-Out round
7	Clinceni	18	7	1	10	23	32	−9	22	Qualification to Play-Out round
8	Cetatea Turnu Măgurele	18	6	2	10	21	30	−9	20	Qualification to Play-Out round
9	Petrolul Potcoava	18	4	5	9	19	25	−6	17	Qualification to Play-Out round
10	Sporting Roșiori	18	2	1	15	11	47	−36	7	Qualification to Play-Out round

Source: FRF (in Romanian)
Rules for classification: 1) Points; 2) Head-to-head points; 3) Head-to-head goal difference; 4) Head-to-head goals scored;
5) Head-to-head away goals scored; 6) Goal difference; 7) Goals scored; 8) Play-off.

=== Series V ===
Pos	Team	Pld	W	D	L	GF	GA	GD	Pts	Qualification
1	Tunari	18	17	0	1	54	8	+46	51	Qualification to Play-Off round
2	Blejoi	18	13	0	5	46	27	+19	39	Qualification to Play-Off round
3	Ștefănești	18	8	5	5	20	17	+3	29	Qualification to Play-Off round
4	Urban Titu	18	7	6	5	27	22	+5	27	Qualification to Play-Off round
5	Petrolul Ploiești II	18	7	5	6	21	17	+4	26	Qualification to Play-Out round
6	Păulești	18	6	3	9	24	29	−5	21	Qualification to Play-Out round
7	Pucioasa	18	4	7	7	21	32	−11	19	Qualification to Play-Out round
8	Flacăra Moreni	18	5	2	11	19	29	−10	17	Qualification to Play-Out round
9	ACS FC Dinamo București	18	4	5	9	13	26	−13	17	Qualification to Play-Out round
10	Sport Team București	18	1	3	14	12	50	−38	6	Qualification to Play-Out round

Source: FRF (in Romanian)
Rules for classification: 1) Points; 2) Head-to-head points; 3) Head-to-head goal difference; 4) Head-to-head goals scored;
5) Head-to-head away goals scored; 6) Goal difference; 7) Goals scored; 8) Play-off.

=== Series VI ===
Pos	Team	Pld	W	D	L	GF	GA	GD	Pts	Qualification
1	Odorheiu Secuiesc	18	11	4	3	41	16	+25	37	Qualification to Play-Off round
2	Băicoi	18	11	4	3	32	12	+20	37	Qualification to Play-Off round
3	SR Brașov	18	11	4	3	36	18	+18	37	Qualification to Play-Off round
4	Plopeni	18	8	7	3	27	14	+13	31	Qualification to Play-Off round
5	Olimpic Zărnești	18	7	3	8	29	33	−4	24	Qualification to Play-Out round
6	Tricolorul Breaza	18	7	2	9	30	29	+1	23	Qualification to Play-Out round
7	Gheorgheni	18	6	3	9	22	25	−3	21	Qualification to Play-Out round
8	Olimpic Cetate Râșnov	18	5	5	8	22	32	−10	20	Qualification to Play-Out round
9	Kids Tâmpa Brașov	18	5	4	9	23	24	−1	19	Qualification to Play-Out round
10	Ciucaș Tărlungeni	18	0	2	16	6	65	−59	2	Qualification to Play-Out round

Source: FRF (in Romanian)
Rules for classification: 1) Points; 2) Head-to-head points; 3) Head-to-head goal difference; 4) Head-to-head goals scored;
5) Head-to-head away goals scored; 6) Goal difference; 7) Goals scored; 8) Play-off.

=== Series VII ===
Pos	Team	Pld	W	D	L	GF	GA	GD	Pts	Qualification
1	Gloria Bistrița-Năsăud	18	13	4	1	48	13	+35	43	Qualification to Play-Off round
2	Unirea Alba Iulia	18	12	5	1	41	9	+32	41	Qualification to Play-Off round
3	CSU Alba Iulia	18	11	6	1	36	16	+20	39	Qualification to Play-Off round
4	Mediaș	18	7	7	4	29	16	+13	28	Qualification to Play-Off round
5	MSE Târgu Mureș	18	7	2	9	22	28	−6	23	Qualification to Play-Out round
6	CIL Blaj	18	6	3	9	15	28	−13	21	Qualification to Play-Out round
7	Unirea Dej	18	5	4	9	27	30	−3	19	Qualification to Play-Out round
8	Metalurgistul Cugir	18	4	5	9	20	35	−15	17	Qualification to Play-Out round
9	Avântul Reghin	18	4	3	11	15	38	−23	15	Qualification to Play-Out round
10	Codlea	18	1	1	16	5	45	−40	4	Qualification to Play-Out round

Source: FRF (in Romanian)
Rules for classification: 1) Points; 2) Head-to-head points; 3) Head-to-head goal difference; 4) Head-to-head goals scored;
5) Head-to-head away goals scored; 6) Goal difference; 7) Goals scored; 8) Play-off.

=== Series VIII ===
Pos	Team	Pld	W	D	L	GF	GA	GD	Pts	Qualification
1	Râmnicu Vâlcea	18	15	3	0	38	6	+32	48	Qualification to Play-Off round
2	Filiași	18	10	4	4	29	18	+11	34	Qualification to Play-Off round
3	Unirea Bascov	18	9	4	5	43	25	+18	31	Qualification to Play-Off round
4	Speed Academy Pitești	18	8	4	6	26	23	+3	28	Qualification to Play-Off round
5	Vulturii Fărcășești	18	7	4	7	30	34	−4	25	Qualification to Play-Out round
6	Jiul Petroșani	18	5	8	5	20	19	+1	23	Qualification to Play-Out round
7	Gilortul Târgu Cărbunești	18	5	3	10	15	29	−14	18	Qualification to Play-Out round
8	Viitorul Dăești	18	4	6	8	23	36	−13	18	Qualification to Play-Out round
9	ARO Muscelul Câmpulung	18	3	7	8	31	29	+2	16	Qualification to Play-Out round
10	Sparta Râmnicu Vâlcea (Note: Sparta Râmnicu Vâlcea withdrew after 15 rounds and forfeited all matches in the second half of the regular season 0–3.)	18	0	5	13	12	48	−36	5	Qualification to Play-Out round

Source: FRF (in Romanian)
Rules for classification: 1) Points; 2) Head-to-head points; 3) Head-to-head goal difference; 4) Head-to-head goals scored;
5) Head-to-head away goals scored; 6) Goal difference; 7) Goals scored; 8) Play-off.

=== Series IX ===
Pos	Team	Pld	W	D	L	GF	GA	GD	Pts	Qualification
1	Politehnica Timișoara	18	10	4	4	31	12	+19	34	Qualification to Play-Off round
2	Minerul Lupeni	18	8	8	2	27	16	+11	32	Qualification to Play-Off round
3	Ghiroda	18	9	4	5	29	25	+4	31	Qualification to Play-Off round
4	Progresul Pecica	18	9	4	5	20	19	+1	31	Qualification to Play-Off round
5	Peciu Nou	18	9	3	6	40	20	+20	30	Qualification to Play-Out round
6	Lotus Băile Felix	18	8	1	9	16	15	+1	25	Qualification to Play-Out round
7	Viitorul Arad	18	5	5	8	14	23	−9	20	Qualification to Play-Out round
8	Gloria Lunca-Teuz Cermei	18	5	4	9	19	29	−10	19	Qualification to Play-Out round
9	Timișul Șag	18	6	1	11	18	29	−11	19	Qualification to Play-Out round
10	Avântul Periam	18	2	4	12	14	40	−26	10	Qualification to Play-Out round

Source: FRF (in Romanian)
Rules for classification: 1) Points; 2) Head-to-head points; 3) Head-to-head goal difference; 4) Head-to-head goals scored;
5) Head-to-head away goals scored; 6) Goal difference; 7) Goals scored; 8) Play-off.

=== Series X ===
Pos	Team	Pld	W	D	L	GF	GA	GD	Pts	Qualification
1	Minaur Baia Mare	18	13	3	2	47	20	+27	42	Qualification to Play-Off round
2	Zalău	18	12	4	2	38	17	+21	40	Qualification to Play-Off round
3	Olimpia Satu Mare	18	11	4	3	35	14	+21	37	Qualification to Play-Off round
4	Crișul Sântandrei	18	10	2	6	34	26	+8	32	Qualification to Play-Off round
5	Sighetu Marmației	18	9	3	6	31	19	+12	30	Qualification to Play-Out round
6	Sănătatea Cluj	18	9	3	6	33	22	+11	30	Qualification to Play-Out round
7	Viitorul Cluj	18	4	4	10	19	41	−22	16	Qualification to Play-Out round
8	Vulturul Mintiu Gherlii	18	3	3	12	13	36	−23	12	Qualification to Play-Out round
9	Olimpia MCMXXI Satu Mare	18	3	1	14	14	44	−30	10	Qualification to Play-Out round
10	Diosig Bihardiószeg	18	1	3	14	13	38	−25	6	Qualification to Play-Out round

Source: FRF (in Romanian)
Rules for classification: 1) Points; 2) Head-to-head points; 3) Head-to-head goal difference; 4) Head-to-head goals scored;
5) Head-to-head away goals scored; 6) Goal difference; 7) Goals scored; 8) Play-off.

== Play-off round ==
=== Series I ===
Pos	Team	Pld	W	D	L	GF	GA	GD	Pts	Qualification
1	FC Bacău (Q)	9	7	0	2	23	11	+12	65	Qualification to promotion play-offs
2	Știința Miroslava (Q)	9	5	1	3	17	12	+5	53	Qualification to promotion play-offs
3	CSM Bacău	9	3	2	4	15	20	−5	44	
4	Gloria Ultra	9	1	1	7	12	24	−12	34	

Source: FRF (in Romanian)
Rules for classification: 1) Points; 2) Points in the regular season; 3) Head-to-head points; 4) Head-to-head goal difference; 5) Head-to-head goals scored;
6) Head-to-head away goals scored; 7) Goal difference (regular season + play off); 8) Goals scored (regular season + play off); 9) Play-off.
(Q) Qualified for the phase indicated

=== Series II ===
Pos	Team	Pld	W	D	L	GF	GA	GD	Pts	Qualification
1	Unirea Braniștea (Q)	9	6	1	2	21	10	+11	59	Qualification to promotion play-offs
2	Sporting Liești (Q)	9	4	3	2	14	13	+1	57	Qualification to promotion play-offs
3	KSE Târgu Secuiesc	9	2	3	4	13	15	−2	46	
4	Aerostar Bacău	9	1	3	5	11	21	−10	42	

Source: FRF (in Romanian)
Rules for classification: 1) Points; 2) Points in the regular season; 3) Head-to-head points; 4) Head-to-head goal difference; 5) Head-to-head goals scored;
6) Head-to-head away goals scored; 7) Goal difference (regular season + play off); 8) Goals scored (regular season + play off); 9) Play-off.
(Q) Qualified for the phase indicated

=== Series III ===
Pos	Team	Pld	W	D	L	GF	GA	GD	Pts	Qualification
1	Popești-Leordeni (Q)	9	7	2	0	21	6	+15	64	Qualification to promotion play-offs
2	Dunărea Călărași (Q)	9	3	3	3	7	13	−6	44	Qualification to promotion play-offs
3	Progresul Fundulea	9	2	3	4	10	14	−4	38	
4	Recolta Gheorghe Doja	9	2	0	7	12	17	−5	38	

Source: FRF (in Romanian)
Rules for classification: 1) Points; 2) Points in the regular season; 3) Head-to-head points; 4) Head-to-head goal difference; 5) Head-to-head goals scored;
6) Head-to-head away goals scored; 7) Goal difference (regular season + play off); 8) Goals scored (regular season + play off); 9) Play-off.
(Q) Qualified for the phase indicated

=== Series IV ===
Pos	Team	Pld	W	D	L	GF	GA	GD	Pts	Qualification
1	Dinamo București (Q)	9	7	1	1	18	7	+11	57	Qualification to promotion play-offs
2	Vedița Colonești (Q)	9	7	0	2	19	14	+5	48	Qualification to promotion play-offs
3	Progresul Spartac București	9	2	2	5	11	12	−1	46	
4	Alexandria	9	0	1	8	7	22	−15	39	

Source: FRF (in Romanian)
Rules for classification: 1) Points; 2) Points in the regular season; 3) Head-to-head points; 4) Head-to-head goal difference; 5) Head-to-head goals scored;
6) Head-to-head away goals scored; 7) Goal difference (regular season + play off); 8) Goals scored (regular season + play off); 9) Play-off.
(Q) Qualified for the phase indicated

=== Series V ===
Pos	Team	Pld	W	D	L	GF	GA	GD	Pts	Qualification
1	Tunari (Q)	9	6	2	1	18	6	+12	71	Qualification to promotion play-offs
2	Blejoi (Q)	9	4	0	5	11	14	−3	51	Qualification to promotion play-offs
3	Ștefănești	9	3	3	3	12	10	+2	41	
4	Urban Titu	9	1	3	5	4	15	−11	33	

Source: FRF (in Romanian)
Rules for classification: 1) Points; 2) Points in the regular season; 3) Head-to-head points; 4) Head-to-head goal difference; 5) Head-to-head goals scored;
6) Head-to-head away goals scored; 7) Goal difference (regular season + play off); 8) Goals scored (regular season + play off); 9) Play-off.
(Q) Qualified for the phase indicated

=== Series VI ===
Pos	Team	Pld	W	D	L	GF	GA	GD	Pts	Qualification
1	Odorheiu Secuiesc (Q)	9	6	1	2	12	6	+6	56	Qualification to promotion play-offs
2	Băicoi (Q)	9	4	2	3	8	10	−2	51	Qualification to promotion play-offs
3	SR Brașov	9	3	4	2	15	9	+6	50	
4	Plopeni	9	1	1	7	6	16	−10	35	

Source: FRF (in Romanian)
Rules for classification: 1) Points; 2) Points in the regular season; 3) Head-to-head points; 4) Head-to-head goal difference; 5) Head-to-head goals scored;
6) Head-to-head away goals scored; 7) Goal difference (regular season + play off); 8) Goals scored (regular season + play off); 9) Play-off.
(Q) Qualified for the phase indicated

=== Series VII ===
Pos	Team	Pld	W	D	L	GF	GA	GD	Pts	Qualification
1	Gloria Bistrița-Năsăud (Q)	9	7	1	1	14	7	+7	65	Qualification to promotion play-offs
2	Unirea Alba Iulia (Q)	9	4	2	3	11	8	+3	55	Qualification to promotion play-offs
3	CSU Alba Iulia	9	4	1	4	7	7	0	52	
4	Mediaș	9	1	0	8	7	17	−10	31	

Source: FRF (in Romanian)
Rules for classification: 1) Points; 2) Points in the regular season; 3) Head-to-head points; 4) Head-to-head goal difference; 5) Head-to-head goals scored;
6) Head-to-head away goals scored; 7) Goal difference (regular season + play off); 8) Goals scored (regular season + play off); 9) Play-off.
(Q) Qualified for the phase indicated

=== Series VIII ===
Pos	Team	Pld	W	D	L	GF	GA	GD	Pts	Qualification
1	Râmnicu Vâlcea (Q)	9	6	2	1	20	8	+12	68	Qualification to promotion play-offs
2	Filiași (Q)	9	3	1	5	13	18	−5	44	Qualification to promotion play-offs
3	Unirea Bascov	9	3	1	5	13	17	−4	41	
4	Speed Academy Pitești	9	4	0	5	15	18	−3	40	

Source: FRF (in Romanian)
Rules for classification: 1) Points; 2) Points in the regular season; 3) Head-to-head points; 4) Head-to-head goal difference; 5) Head-to-head goals scored;
6) Head-to-head away goals scored; 7) Goal difference (regular season + play off); 8) Goals scored (regular season + play off); 9) Play-off.
(Q) Qualified for the phase indicated

=== Series IX ===
Pos	Team	Pld	W	D	L	GF	GA	GD	Pts	Qualification
1	Minerul Lupeni (Q)	9	5	2	2	19	8	+11	49	Qualification to promotion play-offs
2	Politehnica Timișoara (Q)	9	4	2	3	12	8	+4	48	Qualification to promotion play-offs
3	Ghiroda	9	3	2	4	8	20	−12	42	
4	Progresul Pecica	9	2	2	5	10	13	−3	39	

Source: FRF (in Romanian)
Rules for classification: 1) Points; 2) Points in the regular season; 3) Head-to-head points; 4) Head-to-head goal difference; 5) Head-to-head goals scored;
6) Head-to-head away goals scored; 7) Goal difference (regular season + play off); 8) Goals scored (regular season + play off); 9) Play-off.
(Q) Qualified for the phase indicated

=== Series X ===
Pos	Team	Pld	W	D	L	GF	GA	GD	Pts	Qualification
1	Minaur Baia Mare (Q)	9	5	2	2	18	9	+9	59	Qualification to promotion play-offs
2	Olimpia Satu Mare (Q)	9	6	2	1	15	6	+9	57	Qualification to promotion play-offs
3	Zalău	9	4	0	5	14	13	+1	52	
4	Crișul Sântandrei	9	1	0	8	6	25	−19	35	

Source: FRF (in Romanian)
Rules for classification: 1) Points; 2) Points in the regular season; 3) Head-to-head points; 4) Head-to-head goal difference; 5) Head-to-head goals scored;
6) Head-to-head away goals scored; 7) Goal difference (regular season + play off); 8) Goals scored (regular season + play off); 9) Play-off.
(Q) Qualified for the phase indicated

== Play-out round ==
=== Series I ===
Pos	Team	Pld	W	D	L	GF	GA	GD	Pts	Qualification or relegation
5	Vaslui	10	7	1	2	30	13	+17	52	
6	Bucovina Rădăuți	10	4	2	4	17	24	−7	39	
7	Șoimii Gura Humorului	10	6	2	2	15	10	+5	34	
8	Șomuz Fălticeni	10	4	2	4	9	7	+2	32	Possible relegation to Liga IV
9	USV Iași (R)	10	2	3	5	13	18	−5	21	Relegation to Liga IV
10	Ceahlăul Piatra Neamț II (R)	10	1	2	7	9	21	−12	13	Relegation to Liga IV

Source: FRF (in Romanian)
Rules for classification: 1) Points; 2) Points in the regular season; 3) Head-to-head points; 4) Head-to-head goal difference; 5) Head-to-head goals scored;
6) Head-to-head away goals scored; 7) Goal difference (regular season + play out); 8) Goals scored (regular season + play out); 9) Play-off.
(R) Relegated

=== Series II ===
Pos	Team	Pld	W	D	L	GF	GA	GD	Pts	Qualification or relegation
5	Sepsi OSK Sfântu Gheorghe II	8	8	0	0	26	2	+24	52	
6	Râmnicu Sărat	8	2	0	6	9	22	−13	30	
7	Adjud	8	3	1	4	12	17	−5	28	
8	Viitorul Onești	8	3	1	4	8	12	−4	26	Possible relegation to Liga IV
9	Dacia Unirea Brăila (R)	8	3	0	5	10	12	−2	23	Relegation to Liga IV
10	Voința Limpeziș (Note: Voința Limpeziș withdrew in the first stage of the season.) (D)	0	0	0	0	0	0	0	−12	Withdrew

Source: FRF (in Romanian)
Rules for classification: 1) Points; 2) Points in the regular season; 3) Head-to-head points; 4) Head-to-head goal difference; 5) Head-to-head goals scored;
6) Head-to-head away goals scored; 7) Goal difference (regular season + play out); 8) Goals scored (regular season + play out); 9) Play-off.
(D) Disqualified; (R) Relegated

=== Series III ===
Pos	Team	Pld	W	D	L	GF	GA	GD	Pts	Qualification or relegation
5	Gloria Băneasa	10	6	2	2	27	12	+15	45	
6	Înainte Modelu	10	4	3	3	18	11	+7	43	
7	Agricola Borcea	10	4	1	5	13	24	−11	40	
8	Axiopolis Cernavodă	10	3	4	3	17	18	−1	32	Possible relegation to Liga IV
9	Medgidia (R)	10	1	4	5	9	17	−8	22	Relegation to Liga IV
10	Fetești (R)	10	3	4	3	14	16	−2	17	Relegation to Liga IV

Source: FRF (in Romanian)
Rules for classification: 1) Points; 2) Points in the regular season; 3) Head-to-head points; 4) Head-to-head goal difference; 5) Head-to-head goals scored;
6) Head-to-head away goals scored; 7) Goal difference (regular season + play out); 8) Goals scored (regular season + play out); 9) Play-off.
(R) Relegated

=== Series IV ===
Pos	Team	Pld	W	D	L	GF	GA	GD	Pts	Qualification or relegation
5	Oltul Curtișoara	10	8	0	2	22	15	+7	50	
6	Clinceni	10	7	1	2	25	9	+16	44	
7	Cetatea Turnu Măgurele	10	6	1	3	23	14	+9	39	
8	Petrolul Potcoava	10	4	2	4	14	12	+2	31	Possible relegation to Liga IV
9	Dunărea Giurgiu (R)	10	1	1	8	14	25	−11	27	Relegation to Liga IV
10	Sporting Roșiori (R)	10	1	1	8	10	33	−23	11	Relegation to Liga IV

Source: FRF (in Romanian)
Rules for classification: 1) Points; 2) Points in the regular season; 3) Head-to-head points; 4) Head-to-head goal difference; 5) Head-to-head goals scored;
6) Head-to-head away goals scored; 7) Goal difference (regular season + play out); 8) Goals scored (regular season + play out); 9) Play-off.
(R) Relegated

=== Series V ===
Pos	Team	Pld	W	D	L	GF	GA	GD	Pts	Qualification or relegation
5	Petrolul Ploiești II	10	5	1	4	19	16	+3	42	
6	Păulești	10	5	2	3	14	13	+1	38	
7	Pucioasa	10	5	2	3	20	16	+4	36 (Note: Pucioasa are ahead of ACS FC Dinamo București on points from the regular season.)	
8	ACS FC Dinamo București	10	6	1	3	29	22	+7	36	Possible relegation to Liga IV
9	Flacăra Moreni (R)	10	5	2	3	18	10	+8	34	Relegation to Liga IV
10	Sport Team București (R)	10	0	0	10	6	29	−23	6	Relegation to Liga IV

Source: FRF (in Romanian)
Rules for classification: 1) Points; 2) Points in the regular season; 3) Head-to-head points; 4) Head-to-head goal difference; 5) Head-to-head goals scored;
6) Head-to-head away goals scored; 7) Goal difference (regular season + play out); 8) Goals scored (regular season + play out); 9) Play-off.
(R) Relegated

=== Series VI ===
Pos	Team	Pld	W	D	L	GF	GA	GD	Pts	Qualification or relegation
5	Olimpic Zărnești	10	5	3	2	33	17	+16	42	
6	Kids Tâmpa Brașov	10	7	1	2	32	12	+20	41	
7	Gheorgheni	10	5	3	2	30	15	+15	39	
8	Tricolorul Breaza	10	3	4	3	15	15	0	36	Possible relegation to Liga IV
9	Olimpic Cetate Râșnov (R)	10	3	3	4	30	17	+13	32	Relegation to Liga IV
10	Ciucaș Tărlungeni (R)	10	0	0	10	2	66	−64	2	Relegation to Liga IV

Source: FRF (in Romanian)
Rules for classification: 1) Points; 2) Points in the regular season; 3) Head-to-head points; 4) Head-to-head goal difference; 5) Head-to-head goals scored;
6) Head-to-head away goals scored; 7) Goal difference (regular season + play out); 8) Goals scored (regular season + play out); 9) Play-off.
(R) Relegated

=== Series VII ===
Pos	Team	Pld	W	D	L	GF	GA	GD	Pts	Qualification or relegation
5	MSE Târgu Mureș	10	6	4	0	17	6	+11	45	
6	Metalurgistul Cugir	10	5	3	2	20	11	+9	35	
7	CIL Blaj	10	3	4	3	11	12	−1	34	
8	Unirea Dej	10	4	1	5	8	8	0	32	Possible relegation to Liga IV
9	Avântul Reghin (R)	10	3	2	5	12	14	−2	26	Relegation to Liga IV
10	Codlea (R)	10	1	2	7	3	20	−17	9	Relegation to Liga IV

Source: FRF (in Romanian)
Rules for classification: 1) Points; 2) Points in the regular season; 3) Head-to-head points; 4) Head-to-head goal difference; 5) Head-to-head goals scored;
6) Head-to-head away goals scored; 7) Goal difference (regular season + play out); 8) Goals scored (regular season + play out); 9) Play-off.
(R) Relegated

=== Series VIII ===
Pos	Team	Pld	W	D	L	GF	GA	GD	Pts	Qualification or relegation
5	Jiul Petroșani	8	5	1	2	17	8	+9	39	
6	Vulturii Fărcășești	8	3	2	3	13	12	+1	36	
7	Viitorul Dăești	8	5	0	3	15	11	+4	33	
8	ARO Muscelul Câmpulung	8	3	2	3	10	10	0	27	Possible relegation to Liga IV
9	Gilortul Târgu Cărbunești (R)	8	1	1	6	8	22	−14	22	Relegation to Liga IV
10	Sparta Râmnicu Vâlcea (Note: Sparta Râmnicu Vâlcea withdrew in the first stage of the season.) (D)	0	0	0	0	0	0	0	5	Withdrew

Source: FRF (in Romanian)
Rules for classification: 1) Points; 2) Points in the regular season; 3) Head-to-head points; 4) Head-to-head goal difference; 5) Head-to-head goals scored;
6) Head-to-head away goals scored; 7) Goal difference (regular season + play out); 8) Goals scored (regular season + play out); 9) Play-off.
(D) Disqualified; (R) Relegated

=== Series IX ===
Pos	Team	Pld	W	D	L	GF	GA	GD	Pts	Qualification or relegation
5	Peciu Nou	10	4	2	4	18	11	+7	44	
6	Lotus Băile Felix	10	5	3	2	11	8	+3	43	
7	Timișul Șag	10	5	3	2	16	11	+5	37	
8	Viitorul Arad	10	4	0	6	12	18	−6	32	Possible relegation to Liga IV
9	Gloria Lunca-Teuz Cermei (R)	10	3	3	4	21	19	+2	31	Relegation to Liga IV
10	Avântul Periam (R)	10	3	1	6	9	20	−11	20	Relegation to Liga IV

Source: FRF (in Romanian)
Rules for classification: 1) Points; 2) Points in the regular season; 3) Head-to-head points; 4) Head-to-head goal difference; 5) Head-to-head goals scored;
6) Head-to-head away goals scored; 7) Goal difference (regular season + play out); 8) Goals scored (regular season + play out); 9) Play-off.
(R) Relegated

=== Series X ===
Pos	Team	Pld	W	D	L	GF	GA	GD	Pts	Qualification or relegation
5	Sighetu Marmației	10	10	0	0	37	10	+27	60	
6	Sănătatea Cluj	10	7	0	3	31	14	+17	51	
7	Viitorul Cluj	10	4	1	5	22	25	−3	29	
8	Olimpia MCMXXI Satu Mare (R)	10	5	0	5	24	26	−2	25	Possible relegation to Liga IV
9	Vulturul Mintiu Gherlii (R)	10	2	1	7	14	29	−15	19	Relegation to Liga IV
10	Diosig Bihardiószeg (R)	10	1	0	9	9	33	−24	5 (Note: Diosig Bihardiószeg was deducted 4 points.)	Relegation to Liga IV

Source: FRF (in Romanian)
Rules for classification: 1) Points; 2) Points in the regular season; 3) Head-to-head points; 4) Head-to-head goal difference; 5) Head-to-head goals scored;
6) Head-to-head away goals scored; 7) Goal difference (regular season + play out); 8) Goals scored (regular season + play out); 9) Play-off.
(R) Relegated

== Promotion play-offs ==
The promotion play-offs are disputed between the first two teams from each of the ten play-off round series. Only the best five teams will be promoted to 2025–26 Liga II.

=== First round ===
The matches were played on 21 and 24 May 2025.

Team 1	Agg.	Team 2	1st leg	2nd leg
Sporting Liești	w/o (Note: Sporting Liești, CSO Băicoi, and CSO Filiași did not meet the Romanian Football Federation's requirements regarding youth teams in order to qualify for the promotion play-off.)	FC Bacău	w/o	w/o
Știința Miroslava	4–6	Unirea Braniștea	1–2	3–4
Vedița Colonești	2–1 (a.e.t.)	Popești-Leordeni	1–0	1–1 (a.e.t.)
Dunărea Călărași	3–5	Dinamo București	2–4	1–1
Băicoi	w/o	Tunari	w/o	w/o
Blejoi	1–7	Odorheiu Secuiesc	0–3	1–4
Filiași	w/o	Gloria Bistrița-Năsăud	w/o	w/o
Unirea Alba Iulia	1–1 (2–4 p)	Râmnicu Vâlcea	1–0	0–1 (a.e.t.)
Olimpia Satu Mare	6–2	Minerul Lupeni	2–2	4–0
Politehnica Timișoara	3–3 (7–6 p)	Minaur Baia Mare	1–2	2–1 (a.e.t.)

=== Second round ===
The matches were played on 31 May and 4 June 2025.

Team 1	Agg.	Team 2	1st leg	2nd leg
FC Bacău	6–3	Unirea Braniștea	3–1	3–2
Vedița Colonești	3–5	Dinamo București	2–4	1–1
Tunari	5–1	Odorheiu Secuiesc	4–0	1–1
Gloria Bistrița-Năsăud	3–3 (5–4 p)	Râmnicu Vâlcea	1–0	2–3 (a.e.t.)
Olimpia Satu Mare	4–1	Politehnica Timișoara	2–0	2–1

== Possible relegation ==
At the end of the season, a special ranking was compiled among the teams finishing 8th in each of the ten series in order to determine the last relegated team. The table was calculated based only on results from the play-out stage, taking into account matches played against teams ranked 5th to 7th in their respective series.

Pos	Team	Pld	W	D	L	GF	GA	GD	Pts	Relegation
1	Tricolorul Breaza	6	1	3	2	6	10	−4	29	
2	ACS FC Dinamo București	6	3	1	2	18	15	+3	27	
3	Axiopolis Cernavodă	6	2	2	2	11	12	−1	27	
4	Șomuz Fălticeni	6	2	0	4	5	6	−1	24	
5	ARO Muscelul Câmpulung	6	2	1	3	6	7	−1	23	
6	Viitorul Onești	6	2	1	3	6	8	−2	23	
7	Petrolul Potcoava	6	2	0	4	6	8	−2	23	
8	Unirea Dej	6	1	1	4	1	7	−6	23	
9	Viitorul Arad	6	1	0	5	5	15	−10	23	
10	Olimpia MCMXXI Satu Mare (R)	6	1	0	5	11	23	−12	13	Relegation to Liga IV

(R) Relegated

== See also ==
- 2024–25 Liga I
- 2024–25 Liga II
- 2024–25 Liga IV
- 2024–25 Cupa României
