= Sorin Bucuroaia =

Romanian former professional footballer

Personal information
- Full name: Sorin Ciprian Bucuroaia
- Date of birth: 3 February 1978 (age 48)
- Place of birth: Bucharest, Romania
- Height: 1.74 m (5 ft 9 in)
- Position: Midfielder

Youth career
- –1996: Dinamo București

Senior career*
Years	Team	Apps	(Gls)
1996–1997	Drobeta-Turnu Severin		
1997–1998	Extensiv Craiova	28	(2)
1999–2000	ARO Câmpulung	60	(16)
2001	Gaz Metan Mediaș	11	(0)
2001–2003	Gloria Bistrița	40	(6)
2003	Dinamo București	0	(0)
2004	Lombard Pápa	3	(0)
2004–2005	Inter Gaz București	19	(0)
2005–2006	Zimbru Chișinău	16	(1)
2007	FC Snagov	7	(1)
2007–2008	Argeș Pitești	13	(1)
2008–2009	FC Snagov	8	(1)
Total		205	(28)

Managerial career
- 2010: CSM Râmnicu Vâlcea
- 2011: CSM Râmnicu Vâlcea (assistant)
- 2012: CSM Râmnicu Vâlcea (assistant)
- 2013: Dinamo II București (assistant)
- 2013: Speranța Cahul
- 2016–2019: Dinamo București (youth)
- 2019: Daco-Getica București (assistant)
- 2019: Daco-Getica București (head coach)
- 2019: Turris Turnu Măgurele (assistant)
- 2020: Sohar SC (assistant)
- 2020–2021: Al-Taqadom (assistant)
- 2021–2022: Al-Arabi (assistant)
- 2022–2023: Al-Nahda (assistant)
- 2024–2025: Păușești-Otăsău
- 2026: FCSB (assistant)
- * Club domestic league appearances and goals

Sorin Ciprian Bucuroaia (born 3 February 1978) is a Romanian former professional footballer who played as a midfielder.

== Honours ==
=== Player ===
Argeș Pitești

- Liga II: 2007–08

=== Coach ===
Păușești-Otăsău

- Liga IV – Vâlcea County: 2024–25
