= ACS Viitorul Horezu =

Romanian football club

Viitorul Horezu
- Full name: Asociația Club Sportiv; Viitorul Horezu
- Nicknames: Olarii (The Potters); Cocoșii de Hurez (The Roosters of Hurez)
- Short name: Viitorul
- Founded: 1954; 72 years ago as Vulturul Horezu
- Ground: Treapt
- Capacity: 1,500
- Owner: Horezu Town
- Chairman: Valentin Grigorescu
- Manager: Adrian Popa
- League: Liga IV
- 2025–26: Liga IV, Vâlcea County, 1st of 16
Home colours	Away colours

Asociația Club Sportiv Viitorul Horezu, commonly known as Viitorul Horezu, or simply as Viitorul, is a Romanian football club originally from Horezu, Vâlcea County. The team currently competes in Liga IV – Vâlcea County, the fourth tier of the Romanian football.

== History ==
Flacăra Horezu former logo

Flacăra Horezu, under the ownership of Costel Chelcea, achieved successive promotions from the fourth division to the second division. The first attempt came in the 1996–97 season, but after winning the county championship, the team failed to secure promotion, losing 0–2 in the promotion play-off to Severnav Drobeta-Turnu Severin, the Mehedinți County winner, on neutral ground in Târgu Jiu. In the 1997–98 season, the team won Divizia D – Vâlcea County and earned promotion to the third division by defeating Soda Ocna Mureș, the Alba County winner, 2–0 in the promotion play-off. The squad included, among others, Mihai Chirițoiu, Adrian Ionescu, Adrian Glăvan, Mihai Diaconu, Dumitru Bărbuț, Emil Popescu, Ion Olaru, Marian Lețea, Aurel Pavel, Marius Chiță, Constantin Chelcea, Ion Căpătan, Pasăre, Mihai Pufu, and Laurențiu Pufu.

In the 1998–99 season, Flacăra moved to Râmnicu Vâlcea, playing home matches at the Municipal Stadium and strengthening its squad with experienced players such as Cosmin Ursu, Adrian Chircuș, Constantin Gaiță, Bogdan Pistrițu, Constantin Păsărică, and Romeo Neacșu. In the second part of the season, new additions included Valentin David, M. Catargiu, Fl. Stancu, D. Frunză, Ceaușu, Petre Panescu, D. Huza, Nicu Năstasie, and D. Dumitrescu. Initially coached by Marian Bașno, then by Marcel Pigulea between rounds 16 and 24, and once again by Bașno until the end of the season, Flacăra had a strong campaign in Divizia C, finishing second and qualifying for the promotion play-off. In a balanced match played in Sibiu against Sticla Arieșul Turda, victory came in a penalty shoot-out after a 1–1 draw in extra time, securing promotion to the second division. The team also impressed in Cupa României, reaching the Round of 32, where it lost 0–1 to Ceahlăul Piatra Neamț.

In 1999, Flacăra Horezu ceded its place in Divizia B to the newly formed team of Râmnicu Vâlcea Municipality, Flacăra Râmnicu Vâlcea, while continuing to compete in Divizia C under the name Minerul Horezu, after taking over Minerul Berbești’s third-division spot. In the 1999–2000 season, the club finished 11th in Series V. In the 2000–01 season, ownership was transferred to the Prelcon Company, leading to a name change to Prelcon Horezu and a 14th-place finish. In the summer of 2002, the club ceded its Divizia C place to Minerul Berbești.

Costel Chelcea, as head coach, led the team for the next three and a half seasons, finishing 2nd in the 2005–06 season of Divizia D – Vâlcea County. With the league later renamed Liga IV, the team placed 8th in the 2006–07 season and 14th in 2007–08, barely avoiding relegation after a three-point deduction. Chelcea left the team during the winter break and was replaced by Adrian Glăvan as player-coach, who guided the team through the rest of the 2008–09 season, finishing in 9th place.

With Vicențiu Marinescu as the new head coach, Flacăra finished the 2009–10 season in 13th place and 8th in the 2010–11 season. In the summer of 2011, Vasile Ilinca was appointed as head coach, leading the team to a 3rd place finish in the 2011–12 season, followed by 4th place in the North Series during the 2012–13 season.

In the 2013–14 season, under Vasile Ilinca's guidance, Flacăra won Liga IV – Vâlcea County, finishing 1st in the North Series and defeating Șirineasa in the semi-finals, 5–3 on aggregate, and beating Posada Perișani 2–1 in the county championship final. Flacăra, however, lost the promotion play-off to Filiași, the winner of Liga IV – Dolj County, 2–3 at the Municipal Stadium in Drobeta-Turnu Severin.

In the following season, Ilinca led the Roosters of Hurez to a second consecutive county title, again winning the North Series, defeating AFC Băbeni in the semi-finals, and overcoming Șirineasa in the county league final. In the promotion play-off, after a 0–0 draw in the first leg at Cisnădie, Flacăra lost 1–2 in the second leg on Treapt against Măgura Cisnădie, the winner of Liga IV – Sibiu County.

The next two seasons saw the ”Potters” continue to challenge for promotion, with the team led by Ilinca finishing the 2015–16 season on 2nd place one point behind Șirineasa and 3rd place in the 2016–17 season.

After six years at Flacăra, Ilinca was replaced by Adrian Popa who, at only 28 years old, assumed the role of player-coach for the 2017–18 season. Under his leadership, Flacăra won the Liga IV – Vâlcea County and earned promotion to Liga III by defeating Rapid Buzescu, the Liga IV – Teleorman County winners, 9–0 on aggregate. The squad included, among others, Florin Matache, Dorin Hârșu, Samson Nwabueze, Ciprian Dinu, Mircea Șcheau, Dragoș Gheorghescu, Ionuț Vladu, Ștefan Covalschi, Ovidiu Popescu, Gabriel Precup, Adrian Popa, Raul Nistor, Ionuț Simeanu, Radu Georgescu, Adrian Stănică, David Oprescu and Bobi Verdeș.

In the 2018–19 Liga III season, Flacăra Horezu competed in Series III, finishing 3rd out of 16 teams, seventeen points behind leaders Turris-Oltul Turnu Măgurele and five behind runners-up FC U Craiova 1948. The 2019–20 season was interrupted in March 2020 after sixteen rounds due to the COVID-19 pandemic, with Flacăra sitting in 4th place in Series IV. Also, Flacăra managed to reach the Round of 32 in the Cupa României, eliminating Minerul Costești (3–2), Pandurii Târgu Jiu (2–0), and FC Argeș (2–1) before losing 0–2 to Astra Giurgiu.

The club’s financial problems impacted the team in the 2020–21 season, leading to the departure of key players such as S. Nwabueze, C. Dinu, M. Gueye, and R. Georgescu in the summer. With a squad mostly composed of young players, Flacăra still managed to have a solid first half of the season. Head coach Adrian Popa announced his resignation in October 2020 but later reconsidered and remained in charge until January 2021, when he signed with local rivals Viitorul Dăești. In his place, Flacăra appointed Gabriel Mangalagiu, a former Viitorul Dăești coach, as the new head coach. Transfers between the two Vâlcea-based clubs continued, with players like Gabriel Precup, Cr. Munteanu, and Sebastian Preda following Adrian Popa to Viitorul Dăești, while Flacăra Horezu brought in Ion Marian, Ovidiu Comănescu, and Dragoș Trașcă from Dăești. Under Mangalagiu’s leadership, the team finished the season in 7th place in Series VII.

== Honours ==
Liga IV – Vâlcea County

- Winners (6): 1996–97, 1997–98, 2013–14, 2014–15, 2017–18, 2025–26
- Runners-up (3): 1979–80, 2005–06, 2015–16

Cupa României – Vâlcea County

- Winners (3): 2005–06, 2013–14, 2014–15

== Chronology of names ==
Name	Period
Vulturul Horezu	1954–1956
Recolta Horezu	1956–1957
Vulturul Horezu	1957–1958
Avântul Horezu	1958–1960
Unirea Horezu	1960–1967
Flacăra Horezu	1967–1981
Minerul Horezu	1981–1983
Flacăra Horezu	1983–1999
Minerul Horezu	1999–2000
Prelcon Horezu	2000–2001
Flacăra Horezu	2001–2024
Viitorul Horezu	2024–present

== Notable former players ==
The footballers mentioned below have played at least 1 season for Flacăra and also played in Liga 1 for another team.

- (Romania) Radu Bîrzan
- (Romania) Florin Cioablă
- (Romania) Ciprian Dinu
- (Senegal) Mansour Gueye
- (Romania) Robert Ivan
- (Romania) Florin Matache
- (Romania) Cristian Munteanu
- (Romania) Florinel Sandu
- (Romania) Alin Pencea
- (Romania) Robert Popa
- (Nigeria) Samson Nwabueze
- (Romania) Bobi Verdeș
- (Brazil) Arthur Bote
- (Nigeria) Ovye Monday Shedrack
- (Romania) Ionuț Cioinac
- (Romania) Andrei Mirică
- (Romania) George Buliga
- (Romania) Florian Pârvu

== Former managers ==
- (Romania) Vicențiu Marinescu (2009–2011)
- (Romania) Vasile Ilinca (2011–2017)
- (Romania) Adrian Popa (2017–2020)

== League and cup history ==
Season	Tier	Division	Place	Notes	Cupa României
2025–26	4	Liga IV (VL)	1st (C)		County phase - QF
2024–25	4	Liga IV (VL)	7th		County phase - R of 16
2023–24	3	Liga III (Seria VI)	7th	Withdrew	Second round
2022–23	3	Liga III (Seria VI)	4th		Third round
2021–22	3	Liga III (Seria VI)	9th		First round
2020–21	3	Liga III (Seria VII)	7th		Second round
2019–20	3	Liga III (Seria IV)	4th		Round of 32
2018–19	3	Liga III (Seria III)	3rd		
2017–18	4	Liga IV (VL)	1st (C)	Promoted	
2016–17	4	Liga IV (VL)	3rd		
2015–16	4	Liga IV (VL)	2nd		
2014–15	4	Liga IV (VL) (North Series)	1st (C)		Second round
2013–14	4	Liga IV (VL) (North Series)	1st (C)		
2012–13	4	Liga IV (VL) (North Series)	4th		
2011–12	4	Liga IV (VL)	3rd		
2010–11	4	Liga IV (VL)	8th		
2009–10	4	Liga IV (VL)	13th		
2008–09	4	Liga IV (VL)	9th		
2007–08	4	Liga IV (VL)	14th		
2000–01	3	Divizia C (Seria V)	14th	Withdrew	
1999–00	3	Divizia C (Seria V)	11th		
1998–99	3	Divizia C (Seria III)	2nd		Round of 32
1997–98	4	Divizia D (VL)	1st (C)	Promoted	
1982–83	3	Divizia C (Seria VII)	16th	Relegated	
1981–82	3	Divizia C (Seria VII)	10th		
