= Robert Ivan =

Romanian footballer (born 2000)

Personal information
- Full name: Robert Mihai Ivan
- Date of birth: 28 April 2000 (age 26)
- Place of birth: Bucharest, Romania
- Height: 1.80 m (5 ft 11 in)
- Position: Midfielder

Youth career
- –2017: Concordia Chiajna

Senior career*
Years	Team	Apps	(Gls)
2017–2021	Concordia II Chiajna	14	(1)
2019–2021	Concordia Chiajna	9	(0)
2021–2022	Dunărea Călărași	10	(0)
2022	Flacăra Horezu	12	(1)
2022–2023	Dunărea Călărași		
2023–2024	Recolta Gheorghe Doja		
2025	Concordia Chiajna	3	(1)
- * Club domestic league appearances and goals as of 12 April 2025

Robert Mihai Ivan (born 24 April 2000) is a Romanian professional footballer who plays as a midfielder.
