= Alin Pencea =

Romanian footballer

Personal information
- Full name: Alin Florentin Pencea
- Date of birth: 8 June 1992 (age 34)
- Place of birth: Alexandria, Romania
- Height: 1.80 m (5 ft 11 in)
- Position: Midfielder

Team information
- Current team: Sporting Roșiori
- Number: 13

Youth career
- Concordia Chiajna

Senior career*
Years	Team	Apps	(Gls)
2011–2013	Concordia II Chiajna		
2012–2013	→ Alexandria (loan)		
2013–2016	Concordia Chiajna	1	(0)
2014–2016	→ Concordia II Chiajna		
2016–2018	Chindia Târgoviște	51	(1)
2018–2019	Turris Turnu Măgurele	13	(4)
2019–2020	Focșani	6	(0)
2020	Sporting Roșiori	7	(3)
2021	Flacăra Horezu	8	(1)
2021–2022	Filiași	27	(2)
2022–2023	Deva	16	(0)
2023–2024	Jiul Petroșani	25	(2)
2024–	Sporting Roșiori	15	(2)
- * Club domestic league appearances and goals as of 12:18, 23 December 2024 (UTC)

Alin Florentin Pencea (born 8 June 1992) is a Romanian professional footballer who plays as a midfielder for Sporting Roșiori.

== Honours ==
Turris Turnu Măgurele

- Liga III: 2018–19
