= Daniel Huza =

Romanian footballer

Personal information
- Full name: Daniel Petru Huza
- Date of birth: 24 June 1970 (age 56)
- Place of birth: Târnăveni, Romania
- Height: 1.85 m (6 ft 1 in)
- Position: Midfielder

Youth career
- 1980–1988: Chimica Târnăveni
- 1988–1991: Jiul Petroșani

Senior career*
Years	Team	Apps	(Gls)
1991–1998	Jiul Petroșani	92	(12)
1996	→ Minerul Lupeni (loan)		
1998	→ Flacăra Horezu (loan)		
1998	CSM Reșița	1	(0)
1999	Bihor Oradea	11	(1)
1999–2000	Farul Constanța	17	(4)
2000–2001	Jiul Petroșani	11	(0)
2001–2002	Pandurii Târgu Jiu	14	(4)
2002	Jiul Petroșani		
2003	Minerul Lupeni		
2003–2004	Minerul Motru	23	(2)
Total		169+	(23+)

Managerial career
- 2004–2008: Jiul Petroșani (youth)
- 2008–2010: Jiul Petroșani (assistant)
- 2011: Jiul Petroșani
- 2011–2012: Jiul II Petroșani
- 2013–2014: Universitatea Cluj (assistant)
- 2014–2018: Al Dhafra (youth)
- 2018–2019: Sharjah (youth)
- 2019–: Al Ain (youth)
- * Club domestic league appearances and goals as of 25 April 2020

Daniel Petru Huza (born 24 June 1970) is a Romanian former footballer who played as a midfielder mainly for Jiul Petroșani, but also for teams such as Minerul Lupeni, Bihor Oradea or Pandurii Târgu Jiu, among others. According to other sources, Huza played in 95 Liga I matches and scored 15 goals, but also in 200 Liga II matches and scored 56 goals.

After retirement, Huza continued to work for his favourite club, Jiul Petroșani, at the beginning as a coach in the youth center, subsequently being promoted as an assistant coach in the Liga II. In 2011 Huza was promoted as the manager of Jiul, in a tough moment for the club, after it was relegated in the Liga IV due to financial problems. Huza promoted Jiul and next season continued as the manager of the second squad, remaining in the 4th tier. After a short spell at Universitatea Cluj, Huza moved in 2014 in the United Arab Emirates where he continued as a youth coach and technical director for Al Dhafra, Sharjah FC and Al Ain.

== Honours ==
=== Player ===
Jiul Petroșani

- Divizia B: Winner (1) 1995–96
- Divizia C: Winner (1) 2002–03

Minerul Lupeni

- Divizia C: Winner (1) 1995–96

=== Manager ===
Jiul Petroșani

- Liga IV – Hunedoara County: Winner (1) 2010–11
