= Marius Pahonțu =

Romanian professional footballer

Personal information
- Full name: Marius Cătălin Pahonțu
- Date of birth: 22 August 1999 (age 27)
- Place of birth: Ploiești, Romania
- Position: Midfielder

Team information
- Current team: Tricolorul Breaza
- Number: 7

Youth career
- Astra Giurgiu

Senior career*
Years	Team	Apps	(Gls)
2018–2022	Astra Giurgiu	15	(0)
2018–2019	→ Turris Turnu Măgurele (loan)	13	(2)
2022–2023	Blejoi	24	(1)
2023	Focșani	13	(1)
2024	ARO Câmpulung	9	(0)
2024–	Tricolorul Breaza	12	(1)
- * Club domestic league appearances and goals as of 14:44, 8 December 2024 (UTC)

Marius Cătălin Pahonțu (born 22 August 1999) is a Romanian professional footballer who plays as a midfielder for Liga III side Tricolorul Breaza.

== Honours ==
Turris Turnu Măgurele

- Liga III: Winner 2018–19
