= Stadionul Treapt =

Exclusive Movies

- Interactive map of Stadionul Treapt
- Address: Str. Stadionului
- Location: Horezu, Romania
- Coordinates: 45°08′21.4″N 23°59′26.7″E
- Owner: Town of Horezu
- Operator: Viitorul Horezu
- Capacity: 1,500 seated
- Surface: Grass

Construction
- Opened: 1960s
- Renovated: 2009–2011, 2019

Tenants
- Viitorul Horezu (1963–present); Sparta Râmnicu Vâlcea (2024–2025)

Stadionul Treapt is a multi-purpose stadium in Horezu, Romania. It is currently used mostly for football matches, is the home ground of Viitorul Horezu and holds 1,500 people.
