= George Buliga =

Romanian footballer (born 1998)

Personal information
- Full name: George Cătălin Buliga
- Date of birth: 26 April 1998 (age 28)
- Place of birth: Bucharest, Romania
- Positions: Centre back; centre midfielder

Team information
- Current team: Afumați
- Number: 5

Youth career
- –2019: Voluntari

Senior career*
| Years | Team | Apps | (Gls) |
| 2019–2021 | Voluntari | 2 | (0) |
| 2021–2022 | Astra Giurgiu | 15 | (0) |
| 2022–2023 | Afumați | ? | (?) |
| 2023 | Flacăra Horezu | ? | (?) |
- * Club domestic league appearances and goals as of 08:00, 22 June 2022 (UTC)

George Cătălin Buliga (born 26 April 1998) is a Romanian professional footballer who plays as a centre back and a centre midfielder for CS Afumați.

== Club career ==
=== Voluntari ===
Buliga played his first game in Liga I in 2020, in a 3–3 draw against Academica Clinceni.
