= CSO Tricolorul Breaza =

Romanian football club

Tricolorul Breaza
- Full name: Clubul Sportiv Orășenesc Tricolorul Breaza
- Short name: Tricolorul Breaza
- Founded: 1951; 75 years ago as Tricolorul Breaza de Sus; 2010; 16 years ago as Precizia Breaza; 2013; 13 years ago as Tricolorul Breaza
- Ground: Eugen Șoriceanu
- Capacity: 800
- Owner: Breaza Town
- General manager: Marius Vișan
- Manager: Marius Vișan
- League: Liga III
- 2025–26: Liga III, Seria II, 7th
Home colours	Away colours	Third colours

Clubul Sportiv Orășenesc Tricolorul Breaza, commonly known as Tricolorul Breaza, is a Romanian football club based in Breaza, Prahova County and currently playing in the Liga III, the 3rd tier of the Romanian football league system.

The club was founded in 1971 and disbanded in August 2010 when it merged with Liga V team Navobi Iași to form ACSMU Politehnica Iași. In order to continue the football legacy of Breaza, in June 2010, was founded Precizia Breaza, which was enrolled in Liga V Prahova County, the fifth tier. In 2013 Precizia ceded the place in Liga IV to the newly formed multi-sport club club CSO Tricolorul Breaza.

== History ==
Football in Breaza appeared after the First World War, with the press of that time recounting the story of a match played in 1924 in the commune from Prahova Valley between Tricolorul I from Breaza de Sus and Principesa Ileana I from Câmpina. The team was not registered in official competitions, playing only friendly or demonstration matches until 1941, when it was disbanded due to World War II.

In 1951, the club was re-established as Tricolorul Breaza de Sus and was registered in the Câmpina District Championship. In 1953, its name was changed to Recolta Breaza after the two communes, Breaza de Sus and Breaza de Jos, united to form the city of Breaza. It changed its name to Steaua Roșie in 1957 and was disbanded in 1966.

The club was re-established in 1971 as Tricolorul Breaza and entered the Câmpina Territorial Championship, which it won, earning promotion to the Prahova County Championship after a play-off tournament. Until 1991, it played exclusively at the fourth division level, where it finished 2nd twice, in the 1974–75 and 1976–77 seasons, and changed its name to Precizia in 1983.

After the 1990–91 season, due to changes in the competition system by the FRF, Precizia Breaza was forced to play in the fifth division the following season, even though it had not finished in a relegation position. It secured promotion after one season by finishing in 2nd place. This was followed by nine seasons in the fourth division, during which the club changed its name in 1993 to Hidrojet, after the name of the factory that sponsored the club.

Hidrojet promoted to Liga III at the end of the 2000–01 season, winning the Liga IV – Prahova County and the promotion play-off played against Aromet Poșta Câlnau, the winner of Liga IV – Buzău County 2–0 at Tractorul Stadium in Brașov. The lineup of Hidrojet with Ilie Rontea as head coach: Florin Panfil – Ionuț Nicolae (63 Puiu Buciu), Gabriel Bâcneanu (68 Bogdan Cazan), Bogdan Iarca, Antonio Moțoi – Alexandru Chilom, Constantin Rontea (cpt), Cosmin Costache, Paul Enache – Florin Defta, Marian Uțică (82 Marius Vișan).

After promotion to Liga III, the club changed its name to Tricolorul Breaza. In the first season in the third division was assigned to Series II, ending the season in 9th position. Followed six seasons in the third division in which Tricolorul finished as follows: 4th (2002–03), 9th (2003–04), 5th (2004–05), 2nd (2005–06), 11th (2006–07) and 3rd (2007–08). Also, Tricolorul reached the Round of 32 of the 2007–08 Cupa României losing 0–1 to Gloria Buzău.

Tricolorul, with Florin Stăncioiu as head coach, finished the 2008–09 season as runners-up in the third series of Liga III and promoted to Liga II after won the promotion play-offs against Oțelul Galați II and CSO Ovidiu. The squad included the following players: Bogdan Sava, Marius Anghelache, Andrei Stoica, Samson Nwabueze, Rareș Forika, Ionuț Petcu, Cristian Apostol, Mihai Olteanu, Daniel Șandru, Radu Bumbăr, Marian Băeșu, Bogdan Marinescu, Valentin Turiac, Georgian Ghiță, Marius Dascălu, Alin Liuba, Marius Vișan, Andrei Vasilescu, Marian Ghiorghiță. In Cupa României, Tricolorul reached, for the second time in a row, the Round of 32, but lost 1–2 to Oțelul Galați.

Chronology of names
Name	Period
Tricolorul Breaza de Sus	1951-1953
Recolta Breaza	1953-1957
Steaua Roșie Breaza	1957-1966
Tricolorul Breaza	1971–1982
Precizia Breaza	1982–1993
Hidrojet Breaza	1993–2001
Tricolorul Breaza	2001–2010
Precizia Breaza	2010–2013
Tricolorul Breaza	2013–present

In the 2009–10 season, Tricolorul Breaza debuted in the second division, but despite a good start in which it accumulated 9 points from their first five matches, the team led by Florin Stăncioiu finished 16th out of 18 in the Series I being spared from relegation due to the withdrawal of FC Baia Mare from Liga II.

In the summer of 2010, after the bankruptcy of the original Politehnica Iași, the owner Constantin Anghelache moved Tricolorul Breaza to Iași and merged with Liga V team Navobi Iași to form ACSMU Politehnica Iași, leaving the Breaza town without a football team.

In order to continue the football legacy of Breaza, in June 2010, was founded Precizia Breaza, which was enrolled in Liga V – Prahova County, the fifth tier of the Romanian football league system. In the 2010–11 season, Precizia, with Cornel Vasilescu as head coach, played in the West Series of the fifth division and finished in 7th place. The next season saw Precizia promoted to fourth division after won the West Series of Liga V - Prahova County.

In the first season after returning to the fourth division, Precizia finished in 12th place. In 2013, Precizia was absorbed into the newly formed multi-sport club club CSO Tricolorul Breaza, which ended the 2013–14 season in 12th place.

In the following seasons, Tricolorul finished 7th in 2014–15, 13th in 2015–16, 12th in 2016–17, 8th in 2017–18, and 6th in 2018–19. The 2019–20 season was interrupted in March 2020 due to the COVID-19 pandemic, with the team from Breaza in 2nd place at the time.

The 2020–21 season was played in a short tournament with just four teams due to the high costs generated by the medical protocol requirements. Tricolorul finished the tournament in 3rd place.

After finishing 4th in the 2021–22 season, Tricolorul earned promotion to Liga III at the end of the 2022–23 season. The team coached for twenty-one rounds by Constantin Plăvache, then by Marius Vișan, finished 1st in Liga IV Prahova County and won the promotion play-off against Daco-Getica București, 3–3 on aggregate and 9–8 on penalty shoot-outs.

== Honours ==
- Liga III
  - Runners-up (2): 2005–06, 2008–09
- Liga IV – Prahova County
  - Winners (2): 2000–01, 2022–23
  - Runners-up (3): 1974–75, 1976–77, 2019–20
- Liga V – Prahova County
  - Winners (1): 2011–12

== Players ==
=== First team squad ===
As of 10 September 2024

Note: Flags indicate national team as defined under FIFA eligibility rules; some limited exceptions apply. Players may hold more than one non-FIFA nationality.

No.	Pos.	Nation	Player
1	GK	ROU	Dorian Neacșu
2	DF	ROU	Viorel Andrei
3	DF	ROU	Radu Stoica
4	MF	ROU	Roberto Trăistaru
5	FW	ROU	Cosmin Clinci
6	FW	ROU	
7	MF	ROU	Marius Pahonțu
8	MF	ROU	Costin Ioniță
9	FW	ROU	Mihai Vintilă
10	MF	ROU	Daniel Dumitru
11	DF	ROU	Denis Nedelcu

No.	Pos.	Nation	Player
12	GK	ROU	Andrei Minzicu
13	FW	ROU	Grigore Ceapă
14	MF	ROU	Alexandru Țone
16	MF	ROU	Mario Adam
17	MF	ROU	Ștefan Miclea
18	MF	ROU	Marius Duricu (Captain)
20	MF	ROU	Răzvan Catană
21	DF	ROU	Tudor Țăranu
22	DF	ROU	Marius Ioniță
23	MF	ROU	Florin Dumitrache
33	GK	ROU	Alin Negreanu

=== Out on loan ===
Note: Flags indicate national team as defined under FIFA eligibility rules; some limited exceptions apply. Players may hold more than one non-FIFA nationality.

No. / Pos. / Nation / Player	No. / Pos. / Nation / Player

== Club officials ==
=== Board of directors ===
Role	Name
Owners	(Romania) Town of Breaza
President	(Romania) Nicolae Ferăstrăeru
General Manager	(Romania) Marius Vișan
Youth Center Manager	(Romania) Constantin Plăvache
Delegate	(Romania) Florin Drăgoi

=== Current technical staff ===
Role	Name
Manager	(Romania) Marius Vișan
Assistant coach	(Romania) Pompiliu Stoica
Team manager	(Romania) Sergiu Toader
Medical manager	(Romania) Dănuț Căpățînă
Club doctor	(Romania) Valeriu Neagu

== League history ==
Season	Tier	Division	Place	Notes	Cupa României
2025–26	3	Liga III (Seria IV)	TBD		
2024–25	3	Liga III (Seria VI)	8th		
2023–24	3	Liga III (Seria IV)	9th		
2022–23	4	Liga IV (PH)	1st (C)	Promoted	
2021–22	4	Liga IV (PH)	4th		
2019–20	4	Liga IV (PH)	2nd		
2011–12	5	Liga V (PH)	1st (C)	Promoted	
2010–11	5	Liga V (PH)	7th		
2009–10	2	Liga II (Serie I)	16th	Relegated	
2008–09	3	Liga III (Serie III)	2nd	Promoted	Round of 32

Season	Tier	Division	Place	Notes	Cupa României
2007–08	3	Liga III (Serie III)	3rd		Round of 32
2006–07	3	Liga III (Serie III)	11th		
2005–06	3	Divizia C (Serie IV)	2nd		
2004–05	3	Divizia C (Serie IV)	5th		
2003–04	3	Divizia C (Serie IV)	9th		
2002–03	3	Divizia C (Serie II)	4th		
2001–02	3	Divizia C (Serie II)	9th		
2000–01	4	Divizia D (PH)	1st (C)	Promoted	
1976–77	4	Divizia D (PH)	2nd		

== Former managers ==
- (Romania) Valentin Sinescu (2002)
