= Râmnicu Vâlcea Municipal Stadium =

Stadium in Râmnicu Vâlcea, Romania

Municipal Stadium ionești
- Zăvoi Stadium
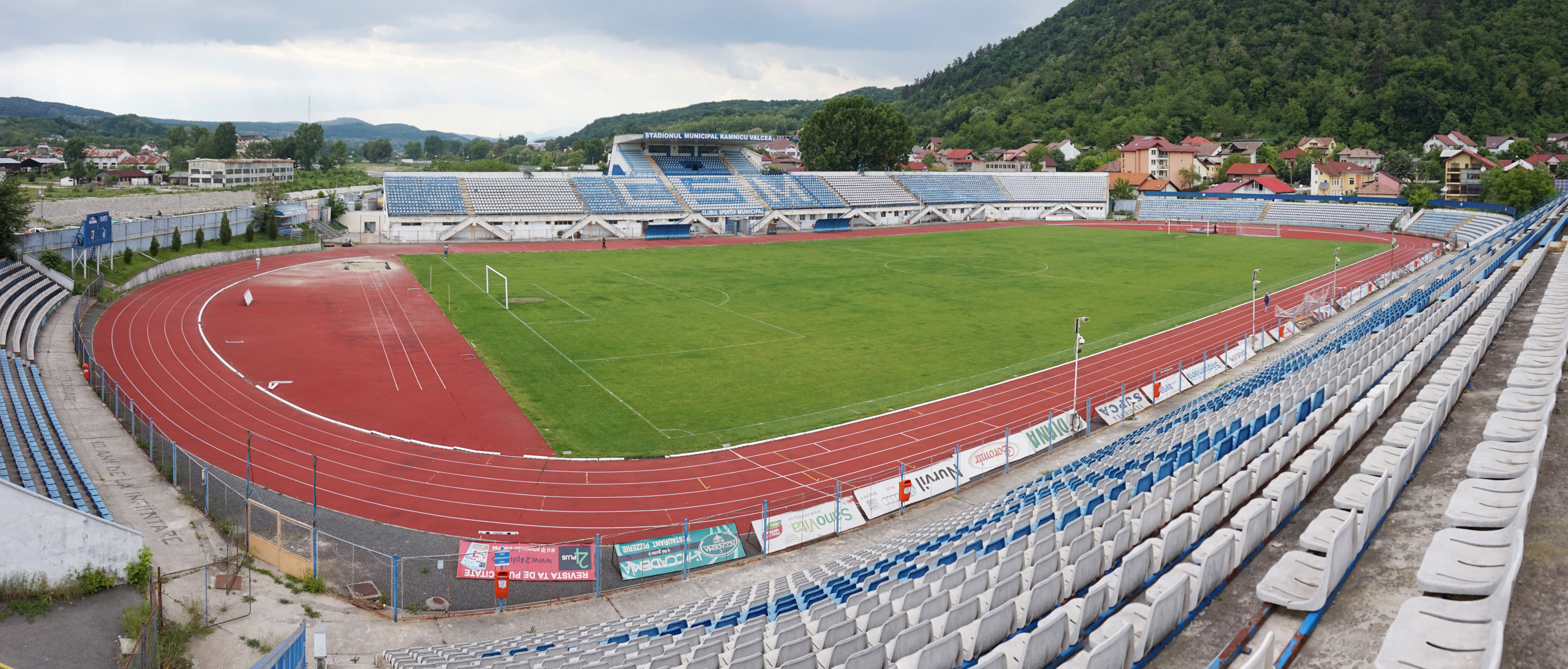
- Interactive map of Municipal Stadium ionești
- Location: Râmnicu Vâlcea, Romania
- Coordinates: 45°06′11.0″N 24°21′08.8″E
- Owner: Municipality of Râmnicu Vâlcea
- Operator: SCM Râmnicu Vâlcea; Minerul Costești
- Capacity: 12,000 seated
- Surface: Grass

Construction
- Opened: 1946
- Renovated: 2006

Tenants
- Chimia Râmnicu Vâlcea (1946–2004); SCM Râmnicu Vâlcea (2004–present); Minerul Costești (2020–present)

The Râmnicu Vâlcea Municipal Stadium is a multi-purpose stadium primarily used for football (soccer) matches. It is situated in Râmnicu Vâlcea, Romania, near Zăvoi Park. With a capacity of 12,000 people, it serves as the home ground for SCM Râmnicu Vâlcea and Minerul Costești.

Additionally, it was formerly the home ground of the now-defunct team Chimia Râmnicu Vâlcea.

== Link ==
Stadion
