= Liga IV Vâlcea =

Fourth tier Romanian football league

- Founded: 1968
- Country: Romania
- Level on pyramid: 4
- Promotion to: Liga III
- Relegation to: Liga V Vâlcea
- Domestic cup: Cupa României – County phase
- Current champions: Viitorul Horezu (6th title) (2025–26)
- Most championships: Forestierul Băbeni and Viitorul Horezu (6 titles each)
- Website: frf-ajf.ro/valcea
- Current: 2025–26 Liga IV Vâlcea

Liga IV Vâlcea (known as Liga IV Nurvil for sponsorship reasons) is one of the regional football divisions of Liga IV, the fourth tier of the Romanian football league system, for clubs based in Vâlcea County, and is organized by AJF Vâlcea – Asociația Județeană de Fotbal (lit. 'County Football Association').

It is contested by a variable number of teams, depending on the number of teams relegated from Liga III, the number of teams promoted from Liga V Vâlcea, and the teams that withdraw or enter the competition. The winner may or may not be promoted to Liga III, depending on the result of a promotion play-off contested against the winner of a neighboring county series.

== History ==
In 1968, following the new administrative and territorial reorganization of the country, each county established its own football championship, integrating teams from the former regional championships as well as those that had previously competed in town and rayon level competitions. The freshly formed Vâlcea County Championship was placed under the authority of the newly created Consiliul Județean pentru Educație Fizică și Sport (lit. 'County Council for Physical Education and Sports') in Vâlcea County.

Since then, the structure and organization of Liga IV Vâlcea, like those of other county championships, have undergone numerous changes. Between 1968 and 1992, the main county competition was known as the Campionatul Județean (County Championship). Between 1992 and 1997, it was renamed Divizia C – Faza Județeană (Divizia C – County Phase), followed by Divizia D starting in 1997, and since 2006, it has been known as Liga IV.

== Promotion ==
The champions of each county association play against one another in a play-off to earn promotion to Liga III. Geographical criteria are taken into consideration when the play-offs are drawn. In total, there are 41 county champions plus the Bucharest municipal champion.

== List of Champions ==
=== Vâlcea Regional Championship ===
Ed.	Season	Winners
1	1951	Progresul Râmnicu Vâlcea
2	1952	Progresul Râmnicu Vâlcea

=== Vâlcea County Championship ===
Ed.	Season	Winners
County Championship
1	1968–69	Lotru Brezoi
2	1969–70	Lotru Brezoi
3	1970–71	Unirea Bujoreni
4	1971–72	Cozia Râmnicu Vâlcea
5	1972–73	Hidroenergia Râmnicu Vâlcea
6	1973–74	Unirea Băbeni
7	1974–75	Cozia Călimănești
8	1975–76	Cozia Călimănești
9	1976–77	Oltul Râmnicu Vâlcea
10	1977–78	Bistrița Băbeni
11	1978–79	Oltul Râmnicu Vâlcea
12	1979–80	Hidroenergia Râmnicu Vâlcea
13	1980–81	Cauciucul Drăgășani
14	1981–82	Cauciucul Drăgășani
15	1982–83	Recolta Mihăești
16	1983–84	Forestierul Băbeni
17	1984–85	Chimistul Râmnicu Vâlcea
18	1985–86	Lotru Brezoi
19	1986–87	Dacia Metalul Râmnicu Vâlcea
20	1987–88	Forestierul Băbeni
21	1988–89	Metalul Râmnicu Vâlcea
22	1989–90	Minerul Berbești
23	1990–91	Forestierul Băbeni
24	1991–92	Autobuzul Drăgășani
Divizia C – County phase
25	1992–93	Minerul Berbești
26	1993–94	Minerul Berbești
27	1994–95	Petrolul Drăgășani
28	1995–96	Minerul Berbești
29	1996–97	Flacăra Horezu
Divizia D
30	1997–98	Flacăra Horezu
31	1998–99	Oltchim Râmnicu Vâlcea
32	1999–00	Cozia Călimănești
33	2000–01	Forestierul Băbeni
34	2001–02	Rarora Mateești
35	2002–03	Lăpușata
36	2003–04	Tineretul Râmnicu Vâlcea
37	2004–05	Lotru Brezoi
38	2005–06	Cozia Călimănești

Ed.	Season	Winners
Liga IV
39	2006–07	Sportul Râmnicu Vâlcea
40	2007–08	Hidroelectra Râmnicu Vâlcea
41	2008–09	Ghecon Lăpușata
42	2009–10	Oltul Ionești
43	2010–11	Damila Măciuca
44	2011–12	Posada Perișani
45	2012–13	Hidroelectra Râmnicu Vâlcea
46	2013–14	Flacăra Horezu
47	2014–15	Flacăra Horezu
48	2015–16	Șirineasa
49	2016–17	Viitorul Dăești
50	2017–18	Flacăra Horezu
51	2018–19	Viitorul Dăești
52	2019–20	Minerul Costești
53	2020–21	Băbeni
54	2021–22	Cozia Călimănești
55	2022–23	Râmnicu Vâlcea
56	2023–24	Sparta Râmnicu Vâlcea
57	2024–25	Păușești Otăsău
58	2025–26	Viitorul Horezu

== See also ==
=== Main Leagues ===
- Liga I
- Liga II
- Liga III
- Liga IV

=== County Leagues (Liga IV series) ===
North–East

- Liga IV Bacău
- Liga IV Botoșani
- Liga IV Iași
- Liga IV Neamț
- Liga IV Suceava
- Liga IV Vaslui

North–West

- Liga IV Bihor
- Liga IV Bistrița-Năsăud
- Liga IV Cluj
- Liga IV Maramureș
- Liga IV Satu Mare
- Liga IV Sălaj

Center

- Liga IV Alba
- Liga IV Brașov
- Liga IV Covasna
- Liga IV Harghita
- Liga IV Mureș
- Liga IV Sibiu

West

- Liga IV Arad
- Liga IV Caraș-Severin
- Liga IV Gorj
- Liga IV Hunedoara
- Liga IV Mehedinți
- Liga IV Timiș

South–West

- Liga IV Argeș
- Liga IV Dâmbovița
- Liga IV Dolj
- Liga IV Olt
- Liga IV Teleorman
- Liga IV Vâlcea

South

- Liga IV Bucharest
- Liga IV Călărași
- Liga IV Giurgiu
- Liga IV Ialomița
- Liga IV Ilfov
- Liga IV Prahova

South–East

- Liga IV Brăila
- Liga IV Buzău
- Liga IV Constanța
- Liga IV Galați
- Liga IV Tulcea
- Liga IV Vrancea
