= SCM Râmnicu Vâlcea =

- Full name: Sport Club Municipal Râmnicu Vâlcea
- Nicknames: Vâlcenii (The People from Vâlcea County); Viperele Albastre (The Blue Vipers); Trupa din Zăvoi (The Squad from Zăvoi)
- Short name: SCM, Vâlcea
- Founded: 2004; 22 years ago as CSM Râmnicu Vâlcea; 2017; 9 years ago as SCM Râmnicu Vâlcea
- Ground: Municipal
- Capacity: 12,000
- Owner: Râmnicu Vâlcea Municipality
- General manager: Jean Turmacu
- Manager: Constantin Schumacher
- League: Liga II
- 2025–26: Liga III, Play-off Series III, 1st (promoted)
Home colours	Away colours

Sport Club Municipal Râmnicu Vâlcea (Romanian pronunciation: [sporˈt klub ˌmuŋi.tʃiˈpal ˈrɨmniku ˈvɨlt͡ʃe̯a]), commonly known as SCM Râmnicu Vâlcea or Râmnicu Vâlcea, is a Romanian professional football club based in Râmnicu Vâlcea, Vâlcea County, which competes in Liga II, the second tier of the Romanian football league system.

Former logo of CSM Râmnicu Vâlcea.

== History ==
=== CSM Râmnicu Vâlcea ===
CSM Râmnicu Vâlcea was founded in 2004 following the dissolution of Chimia Râmnicu Vâlcea, the city's traditional football club. In its first season, CSM won Series V of the 2004–05 Divizia C and earned promotion to Divizia B. The club subsequently became a regular second-tier side and came close to promotion to Liga I on several occasions, finishing third in the 2006–07, 2007–08 and 2013–14 seasons.

The 2013–14 campaign was followed by a dispute over promotion to Liga I. CSM finished third in the promotion play-off, behind CS Universitatea Craiova and ASA Târgu Mureș, but club officials challenged Universitatea Craiova's eligibility to compete in the top division. CSM ultimately remained in Liga II.

In December 2016, the Râmnicu Vâlcea Municipality withdrew its financial support from the football club. Businessman Dan Nițu, the club's other major financier, announced that he was unable to continue financing the team on his own, and most of the senior players subsequently terminated their contracts.

In February 2017, club president Lucian Munteanu announced that the senior team would cease operations, while the youth sections would temporarily continue to compete in their respective competitions. The youth team reached the final of the national Under-17 championship later that year, losing to Atletico Vaslui in a penalty shoot-out, before CSM's remaining football activities were also discontinued.

=== SCM Râmnicu Vâlcea ===
A new municipally supported football project was launched in the summer of 2017 under the name SCM Râmnicu Vâlcea. The initials SCM stood for Sport Club Municipal, while the former club had competed under the initials CSM. The new organisation initially focused exclusively on youth football, with a number of players and coaches from the former CSM structure joining the project.

The senior team was re-established in the summer of 2022 and entered Liga IV – Vâlcea County, with Gabriel Mangalagiu appointed as head coach. SCM won the 2022–23 county championship and faced Rapid Buzescu, the Teleorman County champions, in the promotion play-off. The Vâlcea side won 2–0 away and 4–1 at home, securing promotion to Liga III with a 6–1 aggregate victory.

SCM immediately became one of the leading teams in Liga III. In the 2023–24 season, the club won Series VI and advanced through the first round of the promotion play-offs before facing Câmpulung Muscel in the decisive tie. SCM lost the first leg 1–2 away and drew the return leg 0–0, missing out on direct promotion. Following the expansion of Liga II to 22 teams, SCM received another opportunity through a supplementary promotion tournament, having ranked first among the defeated finalists with seven points and an 8–2 goal difference from its four previous play-off matches. The club failed to secure the additional promotion place and remained in the third tier.

In 2024–25, SCM again won its series and reached the decisive promotion play-off, this time against Gloria Bistrița. Gloria won the first leg 1–0, while SCM won the return leg 3–2 after extra time. With the tie level on aggregate, Gloria prevailed 5–4 in the penalty shoot-out and earned promotion to Liga II. The two legs attracted 8,000 spectators each, the highest attendances of the 2025 Liga III promotion finals.

During the same campaign, SCM recorded its best Cupa României performance under its current identity by qualifying for the group stage of the 2024–25 Cupa României. Drawn in Group D alongside Oțelul Galați, Sepsi OSK, CSM Reșița, Csikszereda and Unirea Alba Iulia, SCM lost its opening two matches against Reșița and Oțelul and was eliminated before the final round.

The 2025–26 season finally brought promotion. With Constantin Schumacher as head coach, SCM qualified for the play-off phase and finished first in its promotion group, securing direct promotion to Liga II. The achievement returned a senior team from Râmnicu Vâlcea to the second tier for the first time since CSM's withdrawal in 2017. Cătălin Doman, one of the squad's most experienced members, recorded the eighth promotion of his career with SCM.

SCM was officially included among the five clubs promoted from Liga III for the 2026–27 Liga II season, alongside Cetatea Suceava, Ștefăneștii de Jos, Politehnica Timișoara and Popești-Leordeni.

== Honours ==
- Liga III
  - Winners (4): 2004–05, 2023–24, 2024–25, 2025–26
- Liga IV – Vâlcea County
  - Winners (1): 2022–23

== First-team squad ==
As of 23 July 2026

Note: Flags indicate national team as defined under FIFA eligibility rules; some limited exceptions apply. Players may hold more than one non-FIFA nationality.

No.	Pos.	Nation	Player
1	GK	ROU	Gabriel Gherguș
2	DF	ROU	Marian Manea
3	DF	ROU	Radu Panaite
4	DF	ROU	Alexandru Sălcianu
5	DF	ROU	David Dumitra
6	MF	ROU	Vlad Achim
8	MF	ROU	Bogdan Florescu
9	FW	ROU	Brian Lemac
10	MF	ROU	Vasile Constantin
11	FW	ROU	Dragoș Huiban
12	GK	ROU	Valentin Frățilă (on loan from Farul Constanța)
16	MF	ROU	Alexandru Mitulețu
17	FW	ROU	Darius Grigore
18	FW	ROU	Octavian Stătescu
19	MF	ROU	Andrei Trașcu
20	FW	ROU	Eric Nistor (on loan from Argeș Pitești)
21	DF	ROU	Ionuț Uleia

No.	Pos.	Nation	Player
23	MF	ROU	Andrei Ionică
24	MF	ROU	Alexandru Saraolu
25	DF	ROU	Vladimir Georgescu
26	MF	ROU	Vlad Ionescu
29	MF	ROU	Cătălin Doman
30	DF	ROU	Alexandru Dandea (Captain)
37	FW	ROU	Marian Danciu
45	GK	ROU	Rareș Ciubotariu
73	MF	ROU	Rareș Tomșa
77	DF	ROU	Eduard Croitoru
80	MF	ROU	Daniel Butișteanu
97	FW	ROU	Sebastian Ivan
98	FW	ROU	Bogdan Pitulac (on loan from Dinamo București)
99	MF	ROU	Gino Oprescu
—	GK	ROU	Luca Crăciun (on loan from Argeș Pitești)
—	DF	ROU	Darius Pițigoi

== Club officials ==
=== Board of directors ===
Role	Name
Owner	(Romania) Râmnicu Vâlcea Municipality
President	(Romania) Marius Țuca
General manager	(Romania) Jean Turmacu
Accountant	(Romania) Maria Gheoculescu

=== Current technical staff ===
Role	Name
Manager	(Romania) Constantin Schumacher
Assistant coach	(Romania) Valentin Năstase
Goalkeeping coach	(Romania) Viorel Dumitrescu
Conditioning coach	(Romania) Ștefan Bulmaga

== League history ==
Season	Tier	Division	Place	Notes	Cupa României
2026–27	2	Liga II	TBD		Play-off round
2025–26	3	Liga III (Play-off Series III)	1st (C)	Promoted	
2024–25	3	Liga III (Seria VIII)	1st (C)		Group stage
2023–24	3	Liga III (Seria VI)	1st (C)		
2022–23	4	Liga IV (VL)	1st (C)	Promoted	
2017–22	Active only at youth level				
2016–17	2	Liga II	17th	Senior team dissolved	Round of 32
2015–16	2	Liga II (Seria II)	7th		Round of 32
2014–15	2	Liga II (Seria II)	7th		Round of 32
2013–14	2	Liga II (Seria II)	3rd		
2012–13	2	Liga II (Seria II)	6th		
2011–12	2	Liga II (Seria II)	12th		
2010–11	2	Liga II (Seria II)	7th		
2009–10	2	Liga II (Seria II)	13th		Round of 32
2008–09	2	Liga II (Seria II)	4th		Round of 32
2007–08	2	Liga II (Seria II)	3rd		
2006–07	2	Liga II (Seria II)	3rd		Round of 32
2005–06	2	Divizia B (Seria II)	6th		
2004–05	3	Divizia C (Seria V)	1st (C, P)	Promoted	

== Former managers ==
- (North Macedonia) Nikola Ilievski (2008)
- (Romania) Alin Artimon (2008–2010)
- (Romania) Sorin Bucuroaia (2010)
- (Romania) Laurențiu Tudor (2011)
- (Romania) Constantin Schumacher (2012)
- (Romania) Laurențiu Tudor (2012–2013)
- (Romania) Erik Lincar (2014)
- (Romania) Ionel Gane (2016)
- (Romania) Eugen Beza (2024–2025)
