= 2024–25 Cupa României =

Cupa României 2024–25

Tournament details
- Country: Romania
- Dates: 31 July 2024 – 14 May 2025
- Teams: 171 (42 qualifying competition); 136 (main competition incl. 7 qualifiers)

Final positions
- Champions: CFR Cluj
- Runners-up: Hermannstadt

The 2024–25 Cupa României was the 87th season of the annual Romanian football cup competition. It is sponsored by Betano and known as the Cupa României Betano for sponsorship purposes. The winner will qualify for the first qualifying round of the 2025–26 edition of the UEFA Europa League. The main competition will face all teams from Liga I through Liga III, which will be joined by 7 play-off winners from Liga IV.

== Schedule ==
The schedule for this season of Cupa României was released on June 28.

Phase	Round	Clubs remaining	Clubs involved	From previous round	Entries in this round	Dates	Teams entering this round
Regional stage	Group stage	171	42	none	42	10, 13, 17 July 2024	42 2023–24 Liga IV teams
Regional stage	Finals	143	14	14	None	20 July 2024	None
National stage	First Round	136	76	7	69	31 July 2024	69 2023–24 Liga III teams (Note: Of those 69 teams, 60 are still in Liga III, while 9 have moved to Liga IV (by relegation, choice or being demoted))
National stage	Second round	98	68	38	30	7 August 2024	18 2024–25 Liga III teams 6 2023–24 Liga III teams (Note: Liga III teams that have won promotion to 2024–25 Liga II); 4 2023–24 Liga II teams (Note: Liga II teams that relegated to 2024–25 Liga III); 2 2024–25 Liga II teams
National stage	Third round	64	48	34	14	14 August 2024	14 2024–25 Liga II teams
National stage	Play-off round	40	32	24	8	28 August 2024	8 2024–25 Liga I teams (9–16)
National stage	Group stage	24	24	16	8	30 October 2024; 4 December 2024; 18 December 2024	8 2024–25 Liga I teams (1–8)
National stage	Quarter-finals	8	8	8	None	2 April 2025	None
National stage	Semi-finals	4	4	4	None	23 April 2025	None
National stage	Final	2	2	2	None	14 May 2025	None

== Regional stage ==
=== Finals ===
The finals of the regional stage were played on July 20.

20 July 2024	CSM Pașcani (4)	5–0	Voința Ion Creangă (4)	Pașcani
18:00				Stadium: CFR; Referee: Șroder Robert

20 July 2024	Talna Orașu Nou (4)	3–3 (a.e.t.) (1–4 p)	Bihorul Beiuș (4)	Orașu Nou
18:00				Stadium: Baza Sportivă Talna; Referee: Bodocan Narcis

20 July 2024	Pogăceaua (4)	3–4 (a.e.t.)	Viitorul Sântimbru (4)	Pogăceaua
18:00				Stadium: Comunal; Referee: Lunca Dragoș Nicolae

20 July 2024	Minerul Lupeni (4)	2–2 (a.e.t.) (7–6 p)	Păulișana Păuliș (4)	Lupeni
18:00				Stadium: Minerul; Referee: Mailat Horatiu Ioan

20 July 2024	Lupii Profa (4)	3–3 (a.e.t.) (5–3 p)	Domnești (4)	Profa
18:00				Stadium: Lupii; Referee: Oancea Stănică Theodor

20 July 2024	Ștefănești (4)	2–1	Boldești-Scăeni (4)	Ștefăneștii de Jos
18:00				Stadium: Dumitru Mătărău; Referee: Filip Claudiu Andrei

20 July 2024	Agigea (4)	2–3 (a.e.t.)	Voința Cudalbi (4)	Agigea
18:00				Stadium: Central; Referee: Gherghi Madalina

== National stage ==
=== First round ===
With the exception of CSM Pașcani's match, all other matches were played on July 31. Four of the seven regional stage winners made it through to the next stage: CSM Pașcani, Lupii Profa, Ștefăneștii de Jos and Voința Cudalbi.

Number of teams per tier still in competition
Liga I (Note: Liga I teams join the competition in the play-off round)	Liga II (Note: Liga II teams join the competition in the second round)	Liga III	Liga IV	Total
16 / 16	22 / 22	83 / 83	15 / 15	136 / 136

31 July 2024	SR Brașov (3)	0–4	CSU Alba Iulia (3)	Brașov
17:30				Stadium: Silviu Ploeșteanu; Referee: Ștef Claudiu

31 July 2024	KSE Târgu Secuiesc (3)	0–2	Odorheiu Secuiesc (3)	Târgu Secuiesc
17:30				Stadium: Dr. Sinkovits; Referee: Cupu Raul George

31 July 2024	Petrolul Potcoava (3)	1–0 (a.e.t.)	Oltul Curtișoara (3)	Potcoava
17:30				Stadium: Petrolul; Referee: Lăstun Mihail Sebastian

31 July 2024	Cozia Călimănești (4)	1–7	Viitorul Dăești (3)	Călimănești
17:30				Stadium: Cozia; Referee: Vremăroiu Andrei Florin

31 July 2024	Turceni (4)	0–7	Gilortul Târgu Cărbunești (3)	Turceni
17:30				Stadium: Orășenesc; Referee: Buzarnescu Dan Stefan

31 July 2024	Minerul Lupeni (4)	0–1 (a.e.t.)	Jiul Petroșani (3)	Lupeni
17:30				Stadium: Minerul; Referee: Bădărău Raul Sebastian

31 July 2024	Voința Lupac (3)	5–0	Phoenix Buziaș (3)	Lupac
17:30				Stadium: Voința; Referee: Herczeg Leopold

31 July 2024	Metalurgistul Cugir (3)	4–1 (a.e.t.)	Mediaș (3)	Cugir
17:30				Stadium: Arena; Referee: Salomir Mircea

31 July 2024	Industria Galda (4)	0–10	Unirea Alba Iulia (3)	Galda de Jos
17:30				Stadium: Galda Arena; Referee: Hurducas Victor

31 July 2024	Viitorul Sântimbru (4)	1–4	Sănătatea Cluj (3)	Sântimbru
17:30				Stadium: Comunal Galtiu; Referee: Pascu Cristian Antonio

31 July 2024	Avântul Reghin (3)	7–0	Târgu Mureș 1898 (3)	Reghin
17:30				Stadium: Municipal; Referee: Țurcanu Dragoș Ionuț

31 July 2024	Minerul Ocna Dej (4)	Walkover	Viitorul Cluj (3)	Jucu
17:30				Stadium: Baza Sportivă Unirea

31 July 2024	Olimpia MCMXXI Satu Mare (3)	1–5	Minaur Baia Mare (3)	Satu Mare
17:30				Stadium: Someșul; Referee: Bodocan Narcis

31 July 2024	Victoria Carei (3)	1–7	Olimpia Satu Mare (3)	Carei
17:30				Stadium: Victoria; Referee: Codrea Cristian

31 July 2024	Lotus Băile Felix (3)	2–2 (a.e.t.) (1–4 p)	Crișul Sântandrei (3)	Sânmartin
17:30				Stadium: Comunal; Referee: Kemenes Norbert

31 July 2024	Bihorul Beiuș (4)	1–2 (a.e.t.)	Gloria Lunca-Teuz Cermei (3)	Ștei
17:30				Stadium: Minerul; Referee: Horvat Pavel Adrian

31 July 2024	Socodor (4)	0–5	Progresul Pecica (3)	Socodor
17:30				Stadium: Comunal; Referee: Gaitin Claudiu

31 July 2024	ACB Ineu (4)	3–1	Șoimii Lipova (3)	Ineu
17:30				Stadium: Central; Referee: Roman George Catalin

31 July 2024	Avântul Periam (3)	1–2	Peciu Nou (3)	Periam
17:30				Stadium: Comunal; Referee: Jurca Tudor Florin

31 July 2024	Viitorul Darabani (4)	Walkover	Șomuz Fălticeni (3)	Darabani
17:30				Stadium: Stadionul Orășenesc Chirica Pușcașu

31 July 2024	Rapid Brodoc (3)	1–1 (a.e.t.) (6–5 p)	CSM Vaslui (3)	Vaslui
17:30				Stadium: Municipal; Referee: Moisă Mihai

31 July 2024	Aerostar Bacău (3)	1–1 (a.e.t.) (4–3 p)	CSM Bacău (3)	Bacău
17:30				Stadium: Aerostar; Referee: Mihuleac Gabriel

31 July 2024	Voința Cudalbi (4)	3–2	Viitorul Onești (3)	Cudalbi
17:30				Stadium: Comunal; Referee: Ungureanu Diana Madalina

31 July 2024	Sporting Liești (3)	2–1	Unirea Braniștea (3)	Liești
17:30				Stadium: Comunal] Referee: Ioniță Eduard

31 July 2024	Hamangia Baia (3)	Walkover	Dacia Unirea Brăila (3)	Baia
17:30				Stadium: Baza Sportivă Baia

31 July 2024	Viitorul Șuțești (4)	Walkover	Viitorul Ianca (3)	Șuțești
17:30				Stadium: Viitorul

31 July 2024	Axiopolis Cernavodă (3)	0–1	Gloria Băneasa (3)	Cernavodă
17:30				Stadium: Ideal; Referee: Moșoiu George Dan

31 July 2024	Înainte Modelu (3)	0–2	Agricola Borcea (3)	Modelu
17:30				Stadium: Vasile Enache; Referee: Porumbel Valentin

31 July 2024	Progresul Fundulea (3)	1–5	Recolta Gheorghe Doja (3)	Fundulea
17:30				Stadium: Orășenesc; Referee: Frățilă Adrian

31 July 2024	Voința Limpeziș (3)	1–3	CSM Râmnicu Sărat (3)	Limpeziș
17:30				Stadium: Voința; Referee: Constantinescu Ionut

31 July 2024	Sporting Roșiori (3)	1–2	Dunărea Giurgiu (3)	Roșiorii de Vede
17:30				Stadium: Municipal; Referee: Diaconu Constantin Adrian

31 July 2024	Ștefănești (4)	4–2	LPS Clinceni (3)	Ștefăneștii de Jos
17:30				Stadium: Dumitru Mătărău; Referee: Trandafir Cristina Mariana

31 July 2024	Păulești (3)	1–3	Plopeni (3)	Păulești
17:30				Stadium: Comunal; Referee: Valusescu Maria Alexandra

31 July 2024	Tricolorul Breaza (3)	1–2	Pucioasa (3)	Breaza
17:30				Stadium: Eugen Șoriceanu; Referee: Ene Mihai Laurențiu

31 July 2024	ARO Muscelul Câmpulung (3)	4–2	Flacăra Moreni (3)	Dragoslavele
17:30				Stadium: Baza Sportivă Sola Grația Dragoslavele; Referee: Robu Ovidiu

31 July 2024	Lupii Profa (4)	4–0	Unirea Bascov (3)	Profa
17:30				Stadium: Lupii; Referee: Olaru Constantin Alin

31 July 2024	Ciucaș Tărlungeni (3)	0–3	Kids Tâmpa Brașov (3)	Tărlungeni
17:30				Stadium: Comunal; Referee: Dumitru Madalin Alexandru

1 August 2024	CSM Pașcani (4)	3–0	Știința Miroslava (3)	Pașcani
17:30				Stadium: CFR; Referee: Moldoveanu Cristian

=== Second round ===
Matches are scheduled to be played on August 7–8.

Number of teams per tier still in competition
Liga I (Note: Liga I teams join the competition in the play-off round)	Liga II	Liga III	Liga IV	Total
16 / 16	22 / 22	55 / 83	5 / 15	98 / 136

7 August 2024	Șomuz Fălticeni (3)	2–2 (a.e.t.) (4–5 p)	Bucovina Rădăuți (3)	Fălticeni
17:30 EEST (UTC+03)				Stadium: Constantin Jamaischi; Referee: Haivas Viorel Mihai

7 August 2024	CSM Pașcani (4)	2–1	Rapid Brodoc (3)	Pașcani
17:30 EEST (UTC+03)				Stadium: CFR; Referee: Iftode Silviu Nicolae

7 August 2024	CS Voința Cudalbi 2015 (4)	1–2	Sporting Liești (3)	Cudalbi
17:30 EEST (UTC+03)				Stadium: Comunal; Referee: Vîrgolici Cristian

7 August 2024	Aerostar Bacău (3)	1–3	ACS FC Bacău (3)	Bacău
17:30 EEST (UTC+03)				Stadium: Aerostar; Referee: Ioniță Eduard

7 August 2024	Odorheiu Secuiesc (3)	0–1	CSM Focșani (2)	Odorheiu Secuiesc
17:30 EEST (UTC+03)				Stadium: Municipal; Referee: Buzea Vasile

7 August 2024	CSM Râmnicu Sărat (3)	1–3 (a.e.t.)	Metalul Buzău (2)	Râmnicu Sărat
17:30 EEST (UTC+03)				Stadium: Municipal; Referee: Terteleac Ana Maria

7 August 2024	Viitorul Ianca (3)	1–2	Dacia Unirea Brăila (3)	Ianca
17:30 EEST (UTC+03)				Stadium: Ștefan Vrăbioru; Referee: Oprea Gabriel

7 August 2024	ACS Kids Tâmpa 2015 Brașov (3)	2–1	Cetate Râșnov (3)	Brașov
17:30 EEST (UTC+03)				Stadium: Silviu Ploeșteanu; Referee: Trandafir Cristina Mariana

7 August 2024	Olimpic Zărnești (3)	2–3 (a.e.t.)	Câmpulung Muscel (2)	Zărnești
17:30 EEST (UTC+03)				Stadium: Celuloza; Referee: Sava Florin Adrian

7 August 2024	Muscelul Câmpulung (3)	3–0	FC Pucioasa (3)	Dragoslavele
17:30 EEST (UTC+03)				Stadium: Baza Sportivă Sola Grația Dragoslavele; Referee: Codrea Cristian

7 August 2024	CSO Plopeni (3)	0–2	CS Blejoi (3)	Plopeni
17:30 EEST (UTC+03)				Stadium: Gheorghe Șilaev; Referee: Dumitru Adrian

7 August 2024	CSL Ștefăneștii de Jos (4)	1–5	CS Tunari (3)	Ștefăneștii de Jos
17:30 EEST (UTC+03)				Stadium: Dumitru Mătărău; Referee: Pavel Adelin

7 August 2024	CS Dinamo București (3)	2–4	CS Afumați (2)	Bucharest
17:30 EEST (UTC+03)				Stadium: Progresul Spartac; Referee: Bădoiu Marius Daniel

7 August 2024	Popești-Leordeni (3)	2–1	Progresul Spartac (3)	Popești-Leordeni
17:30 EEST (UTC+03)				Stadium: Inter Gaz; Referee: Racoare Arthur

7 August 2024	ACS Recolta Gheorghe Doja (3)	2–2 (a.e.t.) (4–5 p)	AS FC Agricola Borcea (3)	Gheorghe Doja
17:30 EEST (UTC+03)				Stadium: Comunal; Referee: Neculcea Bogdan

7 August 2024	Dunărea Giurgiu (3)	4–1	Cetatea Turnu Măgurele (3)	Giurgiu
17:30 EEST (UTC+03)				Stadium: Marin Anastasovici; Referee: Filip Claudiu Andrei

7 August 2024	CSM Olimpia Satu Mare (3)	0–4	SCM Zalău (3)	Satu Mare
17:30 EEST (UTC+03)				Stadium: Daniel Prodan; Referee: Nagy Vladimir Andrei

7 August 2024	Minaur Baia Mare (3)	3–2	Sighetu Marmației (3)	Baia Mare
17:30 EEST (UTC+03)				Stadium: Viorel Mateianu; Referee: Mazilu Florin Ovidiu

7 August 2024	Gloria Bistrița (3)	1–0	Unirea Dej (3)	Bistrița
17:30 EEST (UTC+03)				Stadium: Jean Pădureanu; Referee: Feleki Gellert

7 August 2024	Viitorul Cluj (3)	1–4	Sănătatea Cluj (3)	Cluj-Napoca
17:30 EEST (UTC+03)				Stadium: Baza Sportivă Dan Anca; Referee: Lunca Dragoș Nicolae

7 August 2024	Crișul Sântandrei (3)	1–2	Bihor Oradea (2)	Sântandrei
17:30 EEST (UTC+03)				Stadium: Crișul; Referee: Bădărău Raul Sebastian

7 August 2024	ACB Ineu (4)	0–3	CS Gloria Lunca-Teuz Cermei (3)	Ineu
17:30 EEST (UTC+03)				Stadium: Central; Referee: Necrici Razvan

7 August 2024	Progresul Pecica (3)	3–3 (a.e.t.) (3–5 p)	Politehnica Timișoara (3)	Pecica
17:30 EEST (UTC+03)				Stadium: Progresul; Referee: Chiorean Raul Gabriel

7 August 2024	CSC Peciu Nou (3)	1–2	Dumbrăvița (2)	Peciu Nou
17:30 EEST (UTC+03)				Stadium: Comunal; Referee: Roman George Catalin

7 August 2024	Voința Lupac (3)	0–2	CSC Ghiroda (3)	Lupac
17:30 EEST (UTC+03)				Stadium: Voința; Referee: Dumitru Robert Marian

7 August 2024	Avântul Reghin (3)	0–1	Unirea Ungheni (2)	Reghin
17:30 EEST (UTC+03)				Stadium: Municipal; Referee: Apetrei Cosmin

7 August 2024	Metalurgistul Cugir (3)	1–3	Universitar din Alba Iulia (3)	Cugir
17:30 EEST (UTC+03)				Stadium: Arena; Referee: Mormeci Dumitru Robert

7 August 2024	Unirea Alba Iulia (3)	15–0	CSM Deva (3)	Alba Iulia
17:30 EEST (UTC+03)				Stadium: Cetate; Referee: Timiș Roxana

7 August 2024	Jiul Petroșani (3)	1–1 (a.e.t.) (3–5 p)	Viitorul Târgu Jiu (2)	Petroșani
17:30 EEST (UTC+03)				Stadium: Petre Libardi; Referee: Iviniș Darius Florin

7 August 2024	Gilortul Târgu Cărbunești (3)	4–5 (a.e.t.)	SCM Râmnicu Vâlcea (3)	Târgu Cărbunești
17:30 EEST (UTC+03)				Stadium: Cristinel Răducan; Referee: Naidin Marius

7 August 2024	ACS Lupii Profa (4)	4–2	Viitorul Dăești (3)	Profa
17:30 EEST (UTC+03)				Stadium: Lupii; Referee: Miricioiu Ion Dănuț

7 August 2024	Petrolul Potcoava (3)	3–1	CSO Filiași (3)	Potcoava
17:30 EEST (UTC+03)				Stadium: Petrolul; Referee: Pîrîu Dragoș

7 August 2024	Vedița Colonești (3)	1–4	CSM Alexandria (3)	Colonești
17:30 EEST (UTC+03)				Stadium: Mircea Stan; Referee: Avram Robert

8 August 2024	Gloria Băneasa (3)	0–2	Dunărea Călărași (3)	Băneasa
17:30 EEST (UTC+03)				Stadium: 1 Mai; Referee: Drugea Catalin Gheorghe

=== Third round ===
The third round matches will be played on August 14, 15 and 21.

Number of teams per tier still in competition
Liga I (Note: Liga I teams join the competition in the play-off round)	Liga II	Liga III	Liga IV	Total
16 / 16	22 / 22	24 / 83	2 / 15	64 / 136

14 August 2024	Minaur Baia Mare (3)	1–0 (a.e.t.)	SCM Zalău (3)	Baia Mare
17:30 EEST (UTC+03)				Stadium: Viorel Mateianu; Referee: Apetrei Cosmin

14 August 2024	Sănătatea Cluj (3)	4–1	Gloria Bistrița (3)	Cluj-Napoca
17:30 EEST (UTC+03)				Stadium: Clujana; Referee: Iviniș Darius Florin

14 August 2024	Universitar din Alba Iulia (3)	0–1	Unirea Ungheni (2)	Sebeș
17:30 EEST (UTC+03)				Stadium: Baza Sportivă Pielarul; Referee: Kemenes Norbert

14 August 2024	Unirea Alba Iulia (3)	2–1	1599 Șelimbăr (2)	Alba Iulia
17:30 EEST (UTC+03)				Stadium: Cetate; Referee: Bodocan Narcis

14 August 2024	ACS Kids Tâmpa 2015 Brașov (3)	1–3	Csíkszereda (2)	Brașov
17:30 EEST (UTC+03)				Stadium: Silviu Ploeșteanu; Referee: Bădărău Raul Sebastian

14 August 2024	CS Gloria Lunca-Teuz Cermei (3)	2–6 (a.e.t.)	Bihor Oradea (2)	Cermei
17:30 EEST (UTC+03)				Stadium: Comunal; Referee: Szabo Krisztina

14 August 2024	Politehnica Timișoara (3)	1–2	Dumbrăvița (2)	Timișoara
17:30 EEST (UTC+03)				Stadium: Electrica; Referee: Jurca Tudor Florin

14 August 2024	CSC Ghiroda (3)	0–2	CSM Reșița (2)	Ghiroda
17:30 EEST (UTC+03)				Stadium: Emilian Pavel; Referee: Lunca Dragoș Nicolae

14 August 2024	Câmpulung Muscel (2)	2–0	Chindia Târgoviște (2)	Câmpulung
17:30 EEST (UTC+03)				Stadium: Muscelul; Referee: Ioniță Eduard

14 August 2024	SCM Râmnicu Vâlcea (3)	3–2	Mioveni (2)	Râmnicu Vâlcea
17:30 EEST (UTC+03)				Stadium: Municipal; Referee: Buzarnescu Dan Stefan

14 August 2024	Petrolul Potcoava (3)	0–1	FC U Craiova (2)	Potcoava
17:30 EEST (UTC+03)				Stadium: Petrolul; Referee: Avram Robert

14 August 2024	ACS Lupii Profa (4)	1–6	Slatina (2)	Profa
17:30 EEST (UTC+03)				Stadium: Lupii; Referee: Oancea Stănică Theodor

14 August 2024	Dunărea Giurgiu (3)	2–3	CSM Alexandria (3)	Giurgiu
17:30 EEST (UTC+03)				Stadium: Marin Anastasovici; Referee: Hrusca Dan

14 August 2024	Concordia Chiajna (2)	0–0 (a.e.t.) (4–1 p)	Steaua București (2)	Chiajna
17:30 EEST (UTC+03)				Stadium: Concordia; Referee: Lăstun Mihail Sebastian

14 August 2024	Popești-Leordeni (3)	2–1	CS Tunari (3)	Popești-Leordeni
17:30 EEST (UTC+03)				Stadium: Inter Gaz; Referee: Drugea Catalin Gheorghe

14 August 2024	CS Blejoi (3)	2–3	FC Voluntari (2)	Blejoi
17:30 EEST (UTC+03)				Stadium: Comunal; Referee: Burloiu Dorin

14 August 2024	CS Afumați (2)	2–1	Metaloglobus (2)	Afumați
17:30 EEST (UTC+03)				Stadium: Comunal; Referee: Marcu Claudiu

14 August 2024	AS FC Agricola Borcea (3)	1–1 (a.e.t.) (5–3 p)	Dunărea Călărași (3)	Borcea
17:30 EEST (UTC+03)				Stadium: Comunal; Referee: Diaconu Constantin Adrian

14 August 2024	Dacia Unirea Brăila (3)	1–5	Metalul Buzău (2)	Șuțești
17:30 EEST (UTC+03)				Stadium: Viitorul; Referee: Oancea Andrei

14 August 2024	ACS FC Bacău (3)	0–1	Ceahlăul Piatra Neamț (2)	Ruși-Ciutea
17:30 EEST (UTC+03)				Stadium: Baza Sportivă FC Bacău; Referee: Mihuleac Gabriel

14 August 2024	CSM Pașcani (4)	2–0	Bucovina Rădăuți (3)	Pașcani
17:30 EEST (UTC+03)				Stadium: CFR; Referee: Diaconu Marius

15 August 2024	Muscelul Câmpulung (3)	1–2	FC Argeș (2)	Dragoslavele
17:30 EEST (UTC+03)				Stadium: Baza Sportivă Sola Grația Dragoslavele; Referee: Busi Cătălin

15 August 2024	Sporting Liești (3)	2–3	CSM Focșani (2)	Liești
17:30 EEST (UTC+03)				Stadium: Comunal; Referee: Amorăriței Mihai

21 August 2024	Viitorul Târgu Jiu (2)	0–3	Corvinul Hunedoara (2)	Drobeta-Turnu Severin
17:30 EEST (UTC+03)				Stadium: Municipal; Referee: Robu Ovidiu

=== Play-off round ===
The play-off, scheduled for August 28, features a seeding system.

==== Seeding ====
In this round, 8 seeded teams will face off against 8 of the 24 unseeded teams, while the remaining 16 unseeded teams will compete against each other.

Seeded	Unseeded		
Botoșani (1); Dinamo București (1); Gloria Buzău (1); Hermannstadt (1); Petrolul Ploiești (1); Politehnica Iași (1); Unirea Slobozia (1); Universitatea Cluj (1)	Afumați (2); Agricola Borcea (3); Alexandria (3); Argeș (2); Bihor Oradea (2); Câmpulung Muscel (2); Ceahlăul Piatra Neamț (2); Concordia Chiajna (2)	Corvinul Hunedoara (2); Craiova 1948 (2); Csíkszereda (2); Dumbrăvița (2); Focșani (2); Metalul Buzău (2); Minaur Baia Mare (3); Pașcani (4)	Popești-Leordeni (3); Râmnicu Vâlcea (3); Reșița (2); Sănătatea Cluj (3); Slatina (2); Unirea Alba Iulia (3); Unirea Ungheni (2); Voluntari (2)

==== Matches ====
The draw took place on August 20, and matches are scheduled to be played on August 28.

Number of teams per tier still in competition
Liga I	Liga II	Liga III	Liga IV	Total
16 / 16	16 / 22	7 / 83	1 / 15	40 / 136

27 August 2024	Bihor Oradea (2)	1–3	CSM Reșița (2)	Oradea
17:00 EEST (UTC+03)				Stadium: Iuliu Bodola; Referee: Roman George Catalin

27 August 2024	Minaur Baia Mare (3)	2–3	SCM Râmnicu Vâlcea (3)	Baia Mare
17:30 EEST (UTC+03)				Stadium: Viorel Mateianu; Referee: Gaitin Claudiu

27 August 2024	Sănătatea Cluj (3)	2–1	Câmpulung Muscel (2)	Cluj-Napoca
17:30 EEST (UTC+03)				Stadium: Clujana; Referee: Mihuleac Gabriel

27 August 2024	Dumbrăvița (2)	1–1 (a.e.t.) (4–5 p)	Petrolul Ploiești (1)	Ploiești (Note: Both teams agreed to play the match at Petrolul's ground)
19:00 EEST (UTC+03)				Stadium: Ilie Oană; Referee: Naidin Valentin

28 August 2024	Concordia Chiajna (2)	0–2	Poli Iași (1)	Chiajna
17:30 EEST (UTC+03)			Bordeianu 11'; Teixeira 60'	Stadium: Concordia; Referee: Moldoveanu Cristian

28 August 2024	CSM Focșani (2)	0–3	Hermannstadt (1)	Focșani
17:30 EEST (UTC+03)			Popescu 37'; Deaconu 71'; Iancu 90'	Stadium: Milcovul; Referee: Robu Ovidiu

28 August 2024	CSM Alexandria (3)	0–1	FC Botoșani (1)	Buzescu
17:30 EEST (UTC+03)			Celea 90+8'	Stadium: Comunal; Referee: Baban Vlad

28 August 2024	CSM Pașcani (4)	0–2	Ceahlăul Piatra Neamț (2)	Pașcani
17:30 EEST (UTC+03)			Crețu 70'; Davordzie 88'	Stadium: CFR; Referee: Negară Răzvan

28 August 2024	Unirea Alba Iulia (3)	1–1 (a.e.t.) (5–4 p)	FC U Craiova (2)	Alba Iulia
17:30 EEST (UTC+03)	Fetița 55'		Bălan 11' (pen.)	Stadium: Cetate; Referee: Lăstun Mihail Sebastian

28 August 2024	Agricola Borcea (3)	2–2 (a.e.t.) (4–3 p)	Slatina (2)	Borcea
17:30 EEST (UTC+03)	Militaru 45+3', 104'		Savu 54'; Țîră 113'	Stadium: Comunal; Referee: Ene Mihai Laurențiu

28 August 2024	Popești-Leordeni (3)	0–2	Unirea Ungheni (2)	Popești-Leordeni
17:30 EEST (UTC+03)			Haiduc 13'; Bârstan 85'	Stadium: Inter Gaz; Referee: Naidin Marius

28 August 2024	FC Voluntari (2)	0–1	Dinamo București (1)	Voluntari
19:00 EEST (UTC+03)			Cîrjan 24'	Stadium: Anghel Iordănescu; Referee: Porumbel Valentin

29 August 2024	Metalul Buzău (2)	1–0	Universitatea Cluj (1)	Buzău
17:00 EEST (UTC+03)	Constantinescu 62'			Stadium: Metalul; Referee: Olaru Constantin Alin

29 August 2024	CS Afumați (2)	1–1 (a.e.t.) (5–3 p)	Gloria Buzău (1)	Afumați
17:30 EEST (UTC+03)	Zaina 119' (pen.)		Benzar 95'	Stadium: Comunal; Referee: Avram Robert

29 August 2024	Csíkszereda (2)	1–0	Unirea Slobozia (1)	Miercurea Ciuc
17:30 EEST (UTC+03)	Babati 87'			Stadium: Municipal; Referee: Vadana Sorin

29 August 2024	FC Argeș (2)	2–0	Corvinul Hunedoara (2)	Mioveni
17:30 EEST (UTC+03)	Roman 5'; Buhăcianu 45+1'			Stadium: Orășenesc; Referee: Rusandu Lucian

== Group stage ==
The draw of the group stage took place on September 25.

=== Seeding ===
Seeding was determined based on the positions achieved in the previous league season.

Pot 1	Pot 2	Pot 3
FCSB (1); CFR Cluj (1); Universitatea Craiova (1); Farul Constanța (1); Sepsi Sfântu Gheorghe (1); Rapid București (1); UTA Arad (1); Oțelul Galați (1)	Hermannstadt (1); Petrolul Ploiești (1); Politehnica Iași (1); Dinamo București (1); Botoșani (1); Csíkszereda Miercurea Ciuc (2); CSM Reșița (2); Ceahlăul Piatra Neamț (2)	Argeș Pitești (2); Afumați (2); Unirea Ungheni (2); Metalul Buzău (2); Agricola Borcea (3); Râmnicu Vâlcea (3); Sănătatea Cluj (3); Unirea Alba Iulia (3)

Number of teams per tier still in competition
Liga I	Liga II	Liga III	Liga IV	Total
13 / 16	7 / 22	4 / 83	0 / 15	24 / 136

=== Group A ===
Pos	Team	Pld	W	D	L	GF	GA	GD	Pts	Qualification	CFR	RAP	BOT	AFU	CEA	ARG
1	CFR Cluj	3	2	1	0	6	3	+3	7	Advance to knockout phase	—	—	—	—	2–1	—
2	Rapid București	3	2	0	1	5	2	+3	6	Advance to knockout phase	0–2	—	—	—	—	—
3	Botoșani	3	2	0	1	4	2	+2	6		—	0–2	—	—	—	—
4	Afumați	3	1	1	1	2	3	−1	4		—	0–3	—	—	0–0	2–0
5	Ceahlăul Piatra Neamț	3	0	1	2	1	3	−2	1		1–2	—	0–1	—	—	—
6	Argeș Pitești	3	0	1	2	2	7	−5	1		2–2	—	0–3	—	—	—

Source: FRF
Legend: Blue = home team win; Yellow = draw; Red = away team win.
29 October 2024
21:00 EET (UTC+02)

FC Argeș	2–2	CFR Cluj
Borța 7'; Morar 76' (pen.)	Report	Mogoș 33'; Abeid 44'

Orășenesc, Mioveni
Referee: George Cătălin Roman
30 October 2024
15:00 EET (UTC+02)

CS Afumați	0–0	Ceahlăul Piatra Neamț
	Report

Comunal, Afumați
Referee: Gabriel Mihuleac
30 October 2024
21:00 EET (UTC+02)

FC Botoșani	0–2	Rapid București
	Report	Boupendza 35'; Pop 52'

Municipal, Botoșani
Referee: Adrian Cojocaru

3 December 2024
14:00 EET (UTC+02)

CS Afumați	0–3	Rapid București
	Report	Boupendza 23'; Grameni 63'; Emmers 81'

Comunal, Afumați
Referee: Sorin Andrei Antonie
4 December 2024
15:30 EET (UTC+02)

FC Argeș	0–3	FC Botoșani
	Report	López 15' (pen.), 74'; Petro 64'

Orășenesc, Mioveni
Referee: Andrei Moroiță
4 December 2024
14:00 EET (UTC+02)

Ceahlăul Piatra Neamț	1–2	CFR Cluj
Petre 54'	Report	Nkololo 17'; Korenica 67'

Ceahlăul, Piatra Neamț
Referee: Gabriel Mihuleac

19 December 2024
20:00 EET (UTC+02)

Rapid București	0–2	CFR Cluj
	Report	Kamara 17'; Fică 81'

Rapid-Giulești, Bucharest
Referee: Szabolcs Kovacs
19 December 2024
20:00 EET (UTC+02)

Ceahlăul Piatra Neamț	0–1	FC Botoșani
	Report	Chică-Roșă 28'

Ceahlăul, Piatra Neamț
Referee: Horia Gabriel Mladinovici
19 December 2024
20:00 EET (UTC+02)

CS Afumați	2–0	FC Argeș
Dumitrache 22'; Zaina 82' (pen.)	Report

Comunal, Afumați
Referee: Lăstun Mihail Sebastian

=== Group B ===
Pos	Team	Pld	W	D	L	GF	GA	GD	Pts	Qualification	MET	UCV	FCS	PET	DIN	AGR
1	Metalul Buzău	3	2	1	0	4	0	+4	7	Advance to knockout phase	—	1–0	—	—	0–0	—
2	Universitatea Craiova	3	2	0	1	4	1	+3	6	Advance to knockout phase	—	—	—	—	—	—
3	FCSB	3	2	0	1	6	3	+3	6		—	0–2	—	—	—	—
4	Petrolul Ploiești	3	1	1	1	3	2	+1	4		—	0–2	—	—	—	—
5	Dinamo București	3	0	2	1	0	4	−4	2		—	—	0–4	0–0	—	—
6	Agricola Borcea	3	0	0	3	1	8	−7	0		0–3	—	1–2	0–3	—	—

Source: FRF
Legend: Blue = home team win; Yellow = draw; Red = away team win.
29 October 2024
14:30 EET (UTC+02)

Agricola Borcea	0–3	Petrolul Ploiești
	Report	Hanca 40', 45'; Mateiu 57'

Comunal, Borcea
Referee: Ovidiu Robu
30 October 2024
21:00 EET (UTC+02)

Dinamo București	0–4	FCSB
	Report	Băluță 56'; Phelipe 70'; Ștefănescu 81', 88'

Arena Națională, Bucharest
Attendance: 18,476
Referee: Radu Petrescu
31 October 2024
18:30 EET (UTC+02)

Metalul Buzău	1–0	Universitatea Craiova
	Report

Gloria, Buzău
Referee: Bogdan Dumitrache

4 December 2024
17:45 EET (UTC+02)

Metalul Buzău	0–0	Dinamo București
	Report

Gloria, Buzău
Referee: Viorel Flueran
4 December 2024
20:00 EET (UTC+02)

Petrolul Ploiești	0–2	Universitatea Craiova
	Report	Bană 56'; Houri 87'

Ilie Oană, Ploiești
Referee: Adrian Cojocaru
4 December 2024
14:00 EET (UTC+02)

Agricola Borcea	1–2	FCSB
Burlacu 48'	Report	Ștefănescu 12'; Panțîru 41'

Comunal, Borcea
Attendance: 3,000
Referee: Valentin Naidin

18 December 2024
20:00 EET (UTC+02)

FCSB	0–2	Universitatea Craiova
	Report	Mora 45+1'; Mitriță 85'

Arena Națională, Bucharest
Referee: Horațiu Feșnic
18 December 2024
20:00 EET (UTC+02)

Dinamo București	0–0	Petrolul Ploiești
	Report

Arcul de Triumf, Bucharest
Referee: Marcel Bîrsan
18 December 2024
20:00 EET (UTC+02)

Agricola Borcea	0–3	Metalul Buzău
	Report	Robu 14'; Jozić 52'; Manea 83'

Gloria, Buzău
Referee: Constantin Olaru

=== Group C ===
Pos	Team	Pld	W	D	L	GF	GA	GD	Pts	Qualification	FAR	IAS	HER	SAN	UNG	UTA
1	Farul Constanța	3	1	2	0	7	3	+4	5	Advance to knockout phase	—	—	—	—	—	—
2	Politehnica Iași	3	1	2	0	3	2	+1	5	Advance to play-off	—	—	0–0	—	—	1–1
3	Hermannstadt	3	1	2	0	3	2	+1	5	Advance to play-off	1–1	—	—	—	—	—
4	Sănătatea Cluj	3	0	2	1	3	4	−1	2		1–1	1–2	—	—	1–1	—
5	Unirea Ungheni	3	0	2	1	3	4	−1	2		—	—	1–2	—	—	1–1
6	UTA Arad	3	0	2	1	3	7	−4	2		1–5	—	—	—	—	—

Source: FRF
Legend: Blue = home team win; Yellow = draw; Red = away team win.
29 October 2024
18:00 EET (UTC+02)

Poli Iași	1–1	UTA Arad
Harrison 31'	Report	Fábry 55'

Emil Alexandrescu, Iași
Referee: Cristian Moldoveanu
30 October 2024
15:00 EET (UTC+02)

Unirea Ungheni	1–2	Hermannstadt
Magyari 89'	Report	Chițu 19'; Popescu 67'

Central, Ungheni
Referee: Răzvan Negară
31 October 2024
16:15 EET (UTC+02)

Sănătatea Cluj	1–1	Farul Constanța
Paul 48'	Report	Rivaldinho 85'

Clujana, Cluj-Napoca
Referee: Ana Maria Terteleac

3 December 2024
17:00 EET (UTC+02)

Hermannstadt	1–1	Farul Constanța
Neguț 66'	Report	Rădăslăvescu 55'

Municipal, Sibiu
Referee: Rareș George Vidican
5 December 2024
14:00 EET (UTC+02)

Unirea Ungheni	1–1	UTA Arad
Magyari 83'	Report	Vuletich 11'

Central, Ungheni
Referee: Ovidiu Robu
5 December 2024
14:00 EET (UTC+02)

Sănătatea Cluj	1–2	Poli Iași
Fofana 36'	Report	Mišković 47'; Umar 52'

Clujana, Cluj-Napoca
Referee: Cătălin Buşi

18 December 2024
17:00 EET (UTC+02)

UTA Arad	1–5	Farul Constanța
Ghezali 33'	Report	Cojocaru 4', 20'; Buta 28'; Radaslavescu 45'; Doicaru 74'

Francisc von Neuman, Arad
Referee: Ionuț Coza
18 December 2024
17:00 EET (UTC+02)

Poli Iași	0–0	Hermannstadt
	Report

Emil Alexandrescu, Iași
Referee: Adrian Cojocaru
18 December 2024
17:00 EET (UTC+02)

Sănătatea Cluj	1–1	Unirea Ungheni
Ganea 63' (o.g.)	Report	Cimpoeșu 1' (o.g.)

Clujana, Cluj-Napoca
Referee: George Roman

=== Group D ===
Pos	Team	Pld	W	D	L	GF	GA	GD	Pts	Qualification	RES	ALB	CSI	OTE	SEP	VAL
1	CSM Reșița	3	2	1	0	4	1	+3	7	Advance to knockout phase	—	—	0–0	—	3–1	—
2	Unirea Alba Iulia	3	2	1	0	4	1	+3	7	Advance to knockout phase	—	—	0–0	—	1–0	3–1
3	Csíkszereda Miercurea Ciuc	3	1	2	0	2	1	+1	5		—	—	—	2–1	—	—
4	Oțelul Galați	3	1	1	1	5	4	+1	4		—	—	—	—	0–0	—
5	Sepsi Sfântu Gheorghe	3	0	1	2	1	4	−3	1		—	—	—	—	—	—
6	Râmnicu Vâlcea	3	0	0	3	3	8	−5	0		0–1	—	—	2–4	—	—

Source: FRF
Legend: Blue = home team win; Yellow = draw; Red = away team win.
30 October 2024
15:00 EET (UTC+02)

SCM Râmnicu Vâlcea	0–1	CSM Reșița
	Report	Bocșan 51'

Municipal, Râmnicu Vâlcea
Referee: Dan Hrușcă
30 October 2024
15:45 EET (UTC+02)

Unirea Alba Iulia	1–0	Sepsi Sfântu Gheorghe
Giosu 86'	Report

Cetate, Alba Iulia
Referee: Vasile Buzea
30 October 2024
18:00 EET (UTC+02)

Csíkszereda	2–1	ASC Oțelul Galați
Dolný 87' (pen.); Jebari 90+5'	Report	Tănasă 10'

Municipal, Miercurea Ciuc
Referee: Horia Gabriel Mladinovici

3 December 2024
14:00 EET (UTC+02)

CSM Reșița	3–1	Sepsi Sfântu Gheorghe
Șteau 37'; Erico 72'; Jerdea 90+2'	Report	Kallaku 50'

Mircea Chivu, Reșița
Referee: Iulian Călin
4 December 2024
17:00 EET (UTC+02)

Unirea Alba Iulia	0–0	Csíkszereda
	Report

Cetate, Alba Iulia
Referee: George Cătălin Roman
5 December 2024
14:00 EET (UTC+02)

SCM Râmnicu Vâlcea	2–4	ASC Oțelul Galați
Pârvulescu 12'; Sălcianu 28'	Report	Jurić 13', 24'; Yabré 49'; Bourard 59'

Municipal, Râmnicu Vâlcea
Referee: George Găman

17 December 2024
20:00 EET (UTC+02)

ASC Oțelul Galați	0–0	Sepsi Sfântu Gheorghe
	Report

Oțelul, Galați
Referee: Viorel Flueran
17 December 2024
20:00 EET (UTC+02)

CSM Reșița	0–0	Csíkszereda
	Report

Mircea Chivu, Reșița
Referee: Bogdan Dumitrache
17 December 2024
20:00 EET (UTC+02)

Unirea Alba Iulia	3–1	SCM Râmnicu Vâlcea
Indrei 13', 45+1', 86'	Report	Ivan 58'

Cetate, Alba Iulia
Referee: Robert Avram

=== Play-off ===
Four teams — from two groups, finished the group stage with identical records across all deciding criteria, including points, goal difference, goals scored, and head-to-head results. To determine which teams will advance to the quarterfinals, two play-off matches will be held: one for each group. The Romanian Football Federation has announced that the play-off matches will be scheduled at a later date, with further details to be provided.

23 February 2025
13:00 EET (UTC+02)

Reșița	1–0	Unirea Alba Iulia
Jerdea 21' (pen.)

Mircea Chivu, Reșița
26 February 2025
19:00 EET (UTC+02)

Politehnica Iași	0–1 (a.e.t.)	Hermannstadt
	Report	Stoica 111'

Emil Alexandrescu, Iași

== Knockout stage ==
=== Bracket ===
Quarter-finals
CFR Cluj (p)	1 (5)
Universitatea Craiova	1 (3)
Farul Constanța	3
Unirea Alba Iulia	0
Reșița	0
Hermannstadt	4
Metalul Buzău	0
Rapid București	3

Semi-finals
CFR Cluj	4
Farul Constanța	1
Hermannstadt	2
Rapid București	1

Final
CFR Cluj	3
Hermannstadt	2

=== Quarter-finals ===
1 April 2025	Farul Constanța	3–0	Unirea Alba Iulia	Ovidiu
19:30 EEST (UTC+03)	Ciobanu 8'; Larie 70' (pen.); Grigoryan 88'	Report		Stadium: Central Stadium; Referee: Răzvan Negară

2 April 2025	Reșița	0–4	Hermannstadt	Reșița
17:00 EEST (UTC+03)		Report	Antwi 11'; Stoica 24' (pen.); Buș 36'; Neguț 82'	Stadium: Mircea Chivu Stadium; Referee: Ionuț Coza

2 April 2025	Metalul Buzău	0–3	Rapid București	Buzău
19:30 EEST (UTC+03)		Report	Dobre 54'; Burmaz 56'; N'Jie 73'	Stadium: Municipal Stadium; Referee: Cristian Moldoveanu

3 April 2025	CFR Cluj	1–1 (a.e.t.) (5–3 p)	Universitatea Craiova	Cluj-Napoca
20:00 EEST (UTC+03)	Kamara 60'	Report	Baiaram 50'	Stadium: Dr. Constantin Rădulescu; Referee: Marcel Bîrsan
	Penalties
	Emërllahu (penalty scored); Tachtsidis (penalty scored); Korenica (penalty scored); Păun (penalty scored); Munteanu (penalty scored)		(penalty scored) Mekvabishvili; (penalty scored) Lukić; (penalty missed) Căpățînă; (penalty scored) Baiaram

=== Semi-finals ===
23 April 2025	Hermannstadt	2–1	Rapid București	Sibiu
19:30 EEST (UTC+03)	Gonçalves 16'; Buș 90+4'	Report	Burmaz 85'	Stadium: Sibiu Municipal; Referee: Viorel Flueran

24 April 2025	CFR Cluj	4–1	Farul Constanța	Cluj-Napoca
20:30 EEST (UTC+03)	Graovac 1'; Abeid 42'; Munteanu 45'; Emërllahu 50'	Report	Alibec 35'	Stadium: Dr. Constantin Rădulescu; Referee: Radu Petrescu

== Final ==
14 May 2025	CFR Cluj	3–2	Hermannstadt	Arad
20:30 EEST	Kamara 15'; Munteanu 22'; Nkololo 48'	Report	Căpușă 37'; Buș 74'	Stadium: Francisc von Neuman; Attendance: 9,247; Referee: Andrei Chivulete
