= Petrolul Stadium (Potcoava) =

Multi-use stadium in Potcoava, Romania

- Interactive map of Petrolul Stadium
- Address: Str. Stadionului
- Location: Potcoava, Romania
- Coordinates: 44°28′51″N 24°36′53.8″E
- Owner: Town of Potcoava
- Operator: Petrolul Potcoava
- Capacity: 500 on seats
- Surface: Grass

Construction
- Opened: 1950
- Renovated: 2000s, 2021

Tenant
- Petrolul Potcoava (1950–present)

The Petrolul Stadium is a multi-use stadium in Potcoava, Romania. It is used mostly for football matches, is the home ground of Petrolul Potcoava and holds 500 people on seats.
