= Ianis Gândilă =

Romanian footballer (born 2006)

Personal information
- Full name: Ianis Alessio Gândilă
- Date of birth: 16 January 2006 (age 20)
- Place of birth: Sibiu, Romania
- Height: 1.70 m (5 ft 7 in)
- Position: Midfielder

Youth career
- –2022: Interstar Sibiu
- 2021–2022: → Hermannstadt (loan)
- 2022–2024: Hermannstadt

Senior career*
Years	Team	Apps	(Gls)
2021–2026	Hermannstadt	3	(0)
- * Club domestic league appearances and goals as of 7 December 2025

Ianis Alessio Gândilă (born 16 January 2006) is a Romanian professional footballer who plays as a midfielder.

== Honours ==
Hermannstadt

- Cupa României runner-up: 2024–25
