= CSC Peciu Nou =

Romanian football club

- Full name: Clubul Sportiv Comunal; Peciu Nou
- Nicknames: Peciuanii (The Peciu People); Alb-verzii (The White and Greens)
- Short name: Peciu
- Founded: 1948; 78 years ago as Unirea Peciu Nou
- Ground: Comunal
- Capacity: 1,000 (250 seated)
- Owner: Peciu Nou Commune
- Chairman: Marius Mureșan
- Manager: vacant
- League: not active at senior level
- 2024–25: Liga III, Seria IX, 5th (withdrew)
- Website: https://cscpeciunou.ro/
Home colours	Away colours

Clubul Sportiv Comunal Peciu Nou, commonly known as CSC Peciu Nou, or simply as Peciu, is a Romanian football club based in Peciu Nou, Timiș County. The club was established in 1948, under the name of Unirea Peciu and knew recent important progress in the Romanian football league system, especially after its promotion to Liga III in 2023.

Peciu Nou is a commune composed of three villages: Diniaș, Peciu Nou (commune seat) and Sânmartinu Sârbesc. Under the umbrella of CSC Peciu Nou exist another football team, Partizan Diniaș, a team with an important background in the county level. In the past, Sânmartinu Sârbesc (a village with an important population of Serbs) was the main standard-bearer of the local football through its team, Obilić Sânmartinu Sârbesc, a team that played inclusively in the third tier during the 1990s.

== History ==
CSC Peciu Nou was established in 1948, under the name of Unirea Peciu Nou, and for almost its entire history played at county level. Despite the fact that Peciu Nou is the commune seat of the commune with the same name, football was much more successful in the village of Sânmartinu Sârbesc, where the local team Obilić Sânmartinu Sârbesc reached Divizia C during the 1990s and also with an important mark in the village of Diniaș, where local team Partizanul was a common presence at the level of Liga IV and Liga V. On the other hand, Unirea Peciu Nou had an important presence as well, but only at lower level, where in 1968 was one of the founding members of the Promotion Division (Liga V of today).

In 2006, the football club of Peciu Nou was re-organized under the name of AS Peciu Nou and after only one season spent in the Liga V the club was enrolled in the Liga IV, the first tier of the county level, on the vacant places. For the next 15 years, AS Peciu Nou was a constant at the level of Liga IV, but with no notable results, on the contrary, with rankings more in the second half of the standings, more and more dangerously close to the relegation line, then the promotion line. The first part of the 2019–20 season was a disastrous one, the team entered in the winter break from the last place of the league table, but the COVID-19 pandemic blocked the season, the white and green team thus having time to re-organize. In 2020, AS Peciu Nou was renamed as CSC Peciu Nou being from now on financed exclusively by the commune.

After this movement, the team based in Peciu Nou began its rise, also having a much improved financial situation and together with the disappearance of the local rival from Sânmartinu Sârbesc, "Unirea" became the most representative team of the commune. It was ranked 2nd and 5th at the end of the 2020–21 and 2021–22 seasons, then at the end of the 2022–23 edition, Peciu Nou won Liga IV Timiș for the first time in its 75 years of existence, defeating its main rival CSM Lugoj with a difference of six points. In the Liga III promotion play-offs, Peciu Nou had no emotions in front of Hunedoara champion, Gloria Geoagiu, team they defeated 6–1 on aggregate, thus promoting for the first time in the Liga III.

After the hot summer of 2023, CSC Peciu Nou made its debut in the third division with some style, finishing the 2023–24 season on the third place. When everybody expected a setback, the white and greens surpassed themselves and during the next season obtained some excellent results, being crowned as "autumn champions" of the 9th series of the Liga III.

== Ground ==
CSC Peciu Nou plays its home matches on Comunal Stadium, in Peciu Nou, Timiș County, a small stadium with a capacity of 1,000 people, but only 250 on seats.

== Honours ==
Liga IV – Timiș County

- Winners (1): 2022–23
- Runners-up (1): 2020–21

== League history ==
Season	Tier	Division	Place	Notes	Cupa României
2024–25	3	Liga III (Seria IX)	5th	Withdrew	Second Round
2023–24	3	Liga III (Seria VIII)	3rd		Preliminary Round
2022–23	4	Liga IV (TM)	1st (C, P)	Promoted	Preliminary Round
2021–22	4	Liga IV (TM)	5th		Preliminary Round
2020–21	4	Liga IV (TM)	2nd		Preliminary Round
2019–20	4	Liga IV (TM)	18th		Preliminary Round
2018–19	4	Liga IV (TM)	11th		Preliminary Round

Season	Tier	Division	Place	Notes	Cupa României
2017–18	4	Liga IV (TM)	10th		Preliminary Round
2016–17	4	Liga IV (TM)	16th		Preliminary Round
2015–16	4	Liga IV (TM)	13th		Preliminary Round
2014–15	4	Liga IV (TM)	13th		Preliminary Round
2013–14	4	Liga IV (TM)	13th		Preliminary Round
2012–13	4	Liga IV (TM)	15th		Preliminary Round
2011–12	4	Liga IV (TM)	14th		Preliminary Round
