= Ulmbach =

Ulmbach may refer to:

- Ulmbach (Kinzig), a river of Hesse, Germany, tributary of the Kinzig
- Ulmbach (Lahn), a river of Hesse, Germany, tributary of the Lahn
- Peciu Nou (German name Ulmbach), a commune in Timiș County, Romania
- Ulmbach, a district of the town Steinau an der Straße in Hesse, Germany
