= Comunal Stadium (Peciu Nou) =

Multi-use stadium in Peciu Nou, Romania

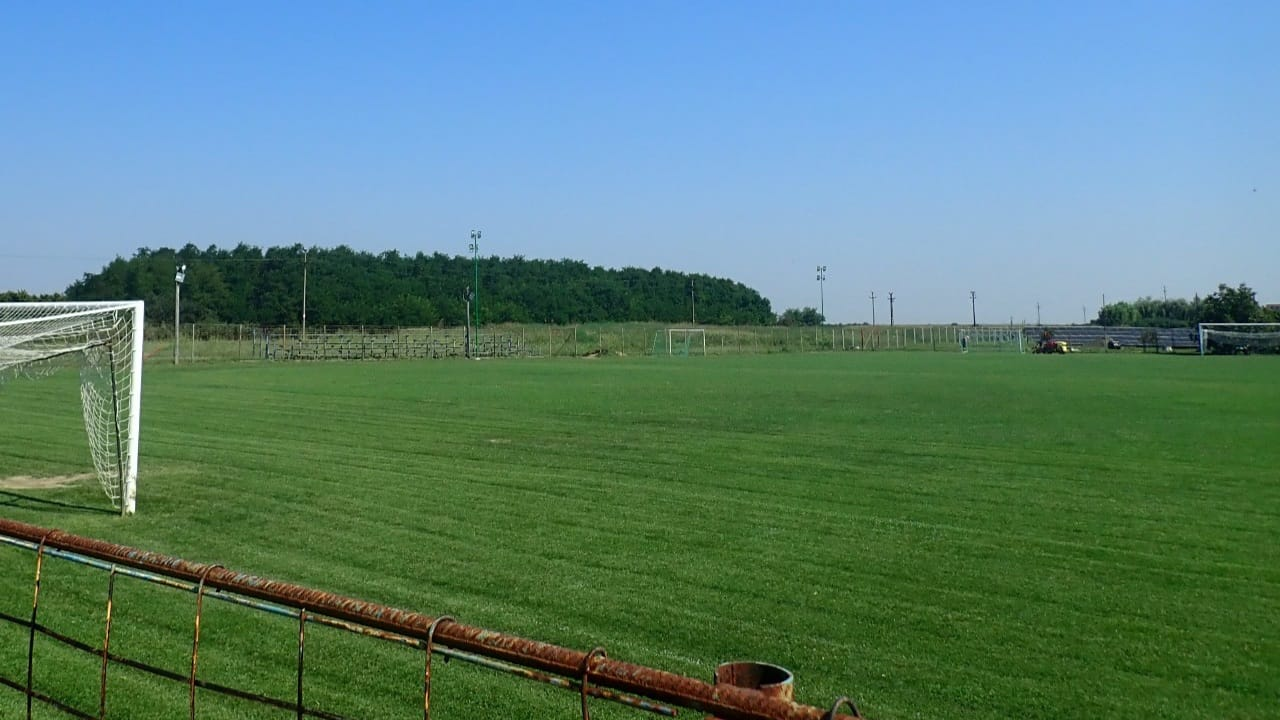
- Interactive map of Comunal Stadium
- Address: DJ 591A
- Location: Peciu Nou, Romania
- Coordinates: 45°36′36.5″N 21°03′25.3″E
- Owner: Commune of Peciu Nou
- Operator: CSC Peciu Nou
- Capacity: 1,000 (250 seated)
- Surface: Grass

Construction
- Opened: 1948
- Renovated: 2016, 2023

Tenant
- Peciu Nou (1948–present)

The Comunal Stadium is a multi-use stadium in Peciu Nou, Romania. It is used mostly for football matches and is the home ground of CSC Peciu Nou. The stadium holds 1,000 people (250 on seats).
