= Stadionul CFR =

There are several stadiums in Romania with the name Stadionul CFR:

- Stadionul CFR (Paşcani)
- Stadionul CFR (Timișoara)
