= Marian Anghelina =

Romanian professional footballer

Personal information
- Date of birth: 2 May 1991 (age 35)
- Place of birth: Potcoava, Romania
- Height: 1.81 m (5 ft 11 in)
- Position: Midfielder

Youth career
- –2008: Petrolul Potcoava

Senior career*
Years	Team	Apps	(Gls)
2008–2014	ALRO Slatina	107	(8)
2014	Dinamo București	0	(0)
2014	Botoșani	2	(0)
2015	Olt Slatina	10	(1)
2016	Afumați	10	(1)
2016–2017	SCM Pitești	10	(1)
2017	Șirineasa	10	(1)
2018	Dacia Unirea Brăila	11	(2)
2018–2019	Ripensia Timișoara	31	(1)
2019–2020	Mioveni	22	(4)
2020–2021	FC U Craiova	17	(2)
2021	Concordia Chiajna	10	(0)
2022	Vedița Colonești	11	(4)
2022	Viitorul Dăești	10	(3)
2023	CSM Slatina	7	(0)
2023–2025	Petrolul Potcoava	42	(8)
- * Club domestic league appearances and goals as of 11:28, 23 December 2024 (UTC)

Marian Anghelina (born 2 May 1991) is a Romanian former professional footballer who played as a midfielder.

== Honours ==
ALRO Slatina

- Liga III: 2009–10

CS Afumați

- Liga III: 2015–16

SCM Pitești

- Liga III: 2016–17

FC U Craiova 1948

- Liga II: 2020–21
