= Ștefăneștii =

Ștefăneștii starts off the names of three places in Romania:

- Ștefăneștii de Jos, a commune in Ilfov County, and its village of Ștefăneștii de Sus
- Ștefăneștii Noi, a village in Ștefănești town, Argeș County
