= Negoiță =

Negoiță is a Romanian surname. Notable people with the surname include:

- Dumitru Negoiță, Romanian javelin thrower
- Liviu Negoiță, Romanian politician and lawyer
- Liviu Negoiță (footballer)
- Robert Negoiță
- Teodor Negoiță
