= Neagu Bratu =

Romanian sports shooter

Personal information
- Born: 4 April 1935 (age 91) Șuțești, Romania

Sport
- Sport: Sports shooting

Neagu Bratu (born 4 April 1935) is a Romanian former sports shooter. He competed at the 1964 Summer Olympics and the 1968 Summer Olympics.
