= Stadionul Dumitru Mătărău =

Multi-use stadium in Ștefăneștii de Jos, Romania

- Interactive map of Stadionul Dumitru Mătărău
- Address: Str. Stadionului
- Location: Ștefăneștii de Sus, Romania
- Coordinates: 44°32′21.3″N 26°12′10.5″E
- Owner: Commune of Ștefăneștii de Jos
- Operator: CSL Ștefănești
- Capacity: 1,150 seated
- Surface: grass

Construction
- Opened: 1970
- Renovated: 2009–2012

Tenant
- Ștefănești (1997–present)

Stadionul Dumitru Mătărău is a multi-use stadium in Ștefăneștii de Jos, Romania. It is used mostly for football matches and is the home ground of CSL Ștefănești. Temporarily here played Sportul Snagov, team whose stadium was under renovation. The stadium holds 1,150 people.
