= Ioan Bârstan =

Romanian footballer (born 2004)

Personal information
- Date of birth: 24 June 2004 (age 22)
- Place of birth: Cluj-Napoca, Romania
- Height: 1.75 m (5 ft 9 in)
- Position: Winger

Youth career
- Universitatea Cluj
- –2016: Viitorul Mihai Georgescu
- 2016–2020: Ardealul Cluj
- 2020–2023: CFR Cluj

Senior career*
Years	Team	Apps	(Gls)
2020–2023	CFR II Cluj		
2023–2025	CFR Cluj	0	(0)
2023–2024	→ Unirea Ungheni (loan)	15	(1)
2025–2026	Universitatea Cluj	0	(0)
2025–2026	→ Hermannstadt (loan)	2	(0)
- * Club domestic league appearances and goals as of 24 April 2026

Ioan Bârstan (born 24 June 2004) is a Romanian professional footballer who plays as a winger.

== Honours ==
CFR Cluj

- Cupa României: 2024–25
