= Stadionul Comunal (Liești) =

Stadium in Romania

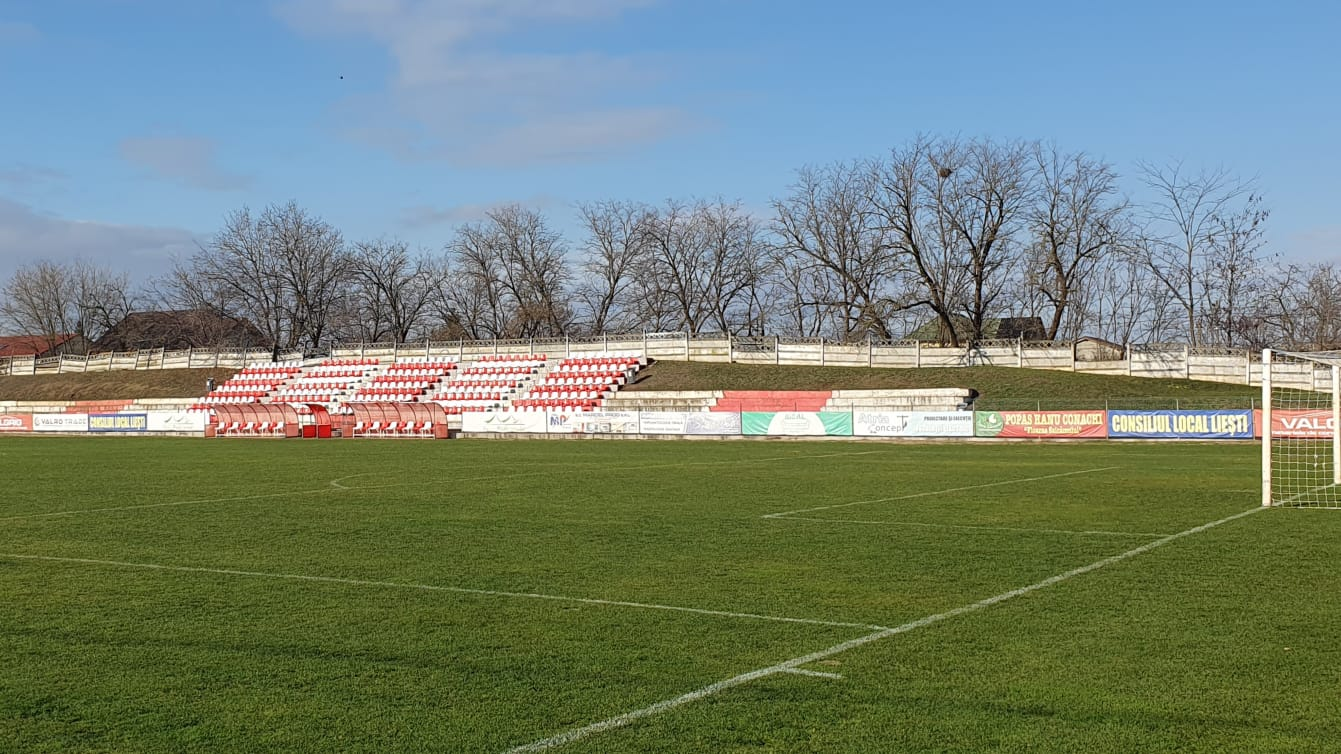
- Interactive map of Stadionul Comunal
- Former names: Voința
- Address: Str. Stadionului
- Location: Liești, Romania
- Coordinates: 45°37′47.8″N 27°31′55.9″E
- Owner: Commune of Liești
- Operator: Sporting Liești
- Capacity: 2,500 (0 seated)
- Surface: Grass

Construction
- Renovated: 2010–2012

Tenants
- Voința Liești; Sporting Liești (2012–present)

Stadionul Comunal is a multi-use stadium in Liești, Romania. It is used mostly for football matches, is the home ground of Sporting Liești and has a capacity of 2,500 people on standing terrace.
