= CS Sporting Liești =

Romanian football club

Sporting Liești
- Full name: Clubul Sportiv Sporting Liești
- Nicknames: Lieștenii (The People from Liești)
- Short name: Sporting
- Founded: 2000; 26 years ago
- Ground: Comunal
- Capacity: 2,500
- Owner: Liești Commune
- Chairman: Marcel Scarlat
- Manager: Cătălin Savu
- League: Liga III
- 2025–26: Liga III, Seria I, 3rd
Home colours	Away colours

Clubul Sportiv Sporting Liești, commonly known as Sporting Liești, is a Romanian football club based in Liești, Galați County. The team currently competes in Liga III, the third tier of Romanian football.

== History ==
Led by Doru Buciumeanu since the summer of 2011, Sporting won the Liga IV – Galați County in the 2011–12 season but lost the promotion play-off against CSM Moinești, the winner of Liga IV – Bacău County, 0–5 on neutral ground at Municipal Stadium in Huși. However, promotion came at the end of the following season, after winning the county league for the second time in a row and defeating FC Gârceni, the Vaslui County winner, 5–3 at Letea Stadium in Bacău.

Sporting’s debut in Liga III was tough. Buciumeanu was replaced by Valentin Kramer three rounds before the end of the regular season, with the team finishing 9th. Sporting then ended 10th in the relegation play-out of Series II in the 2013–14 campaign. Kramer stayed on for the 2014–15 season, leading the team to 10th place in Series I.

Ionuț Niculcea took over in summer 2015 and guided Sporting to 6th place in Series I in 2015–16, followed by three consecutive 8th-place finishes in Series I from 2016–17, 2017–18, and 2018–19. During the 2018–19 season, Sporting also reached the Round of 32 in the Cupa României, losing 0–3 to Mioveni.

In 2019, Doru Balmuș was appointed head coach but was replaced by Niculcea in January 2020. The 2019–20 season was interrupted after 16 rounds on 9 March 2020 due to the COVID-19 pandemic, with Sporting sitting in 10th place in Series I. In the 2020–21 season, Niculcea led the team to 6th place in Series II.

Initially appointed as interim following Niculcea’s departure, Cristian Brăneț was confirmed as permanent head coach for the 2021–22 season, guiding the team to 5th place in Series II at both the end of the regular season and after the play-out round.

Following a poor start to the 2022–23 campaign, with only six points from the first seven matches, Brăneț was replaced by Cătălin Savu. Under Savu’s guidance, Sporting finished 6th in the regular season and 5th overall after the Series II play-out. In the 2023–24 season, the team improved further, finishing 3rd in the regular season and 4th in the series play-off.

In the 2024–25 season, Lieștenii topped the regular season standings in Series II but finished 2nd in the play-off, behind Unirea Braniștea, achieving the club’s best-ever position in Liga III and qualifying for the promotion play-off. However, Sporting did not meet the Romanian Football Federation’s requirements regarding youth teams and was therefore unable to participate in the play-off match against FC Bacău.

== Ground ==
The club plays its home matches on Comunal Stadium in Liești, Galați County and has a capacity of 2,500 people on standing terrace.

== Honours ==
=== Leagues ===
- Liga III
  - Runners-up (1): 2024–25
- Liga IV – Galați County
  - Winners (2): 2011–12, 2012–13

==== Cups ====
- Cupa României – Galați County
  - Winners (1): 2012–13

=== Other performances ===
- 12 seasons in Liga III

== Players ==
=== First-team squad ===
As of 10 September 2024

Note: Flags indicate national team as defined under FIFA eligibility rules; some limited exceptions apply. Players may hold more than one non-FIFA nationality.

No.	Pos.	Nation	Player
1	GK	ROU	Andrei Brăneț
2	DF	ROU	David Dima
5	MF	ROU	Daniel Munchiu
6	MF	ROU	Bogdan Crihană
7	DF	ROU	Rareș Băluță
8	FW	ROU	Adrian Grigoraș
9	FW	ROU	Viorel Costea
10	MF	ROU	Gicu Iordache (Vice-Captain)
11	MF	ROU	Alexandru Stan
13	FW	ROU	Vlad Nacu
15	MF	ROU	Paul Popa

No.	Pos.	Nation	Player
16	MF	ROU	Eduard Pavel
17	MF	ROU	George Iacob
19	FW	ROU	Leonid Gherase
20	DF	ROU	Mihai Coman (on loan from Farul)
21	FW	ROU	Cristian Dima
22	MF	ROU	Ștefan Podașcă
45	GK	ROU	Rareș Ciubotariu (on loan from Farul)
77	MF	ROU	Claudiu Maftei (Captain)
88	DF	ROU	Tudor Năstase
98	MF	ROU	Ionuț Chiriac
99	MF	ROU	Cosmin Căldăruș

=== Out on loan ===
Note: Flags indicate national team as defined under FIFA eligibility rules; some limited exceptions apply. Players may hold more than one non-FIFA nationality.

No. / Pos. / Nation / Player	No. / Pos. / Nation / Player

== Club officials ==
=== Board of directors ===
Role	Name
Owner	(Romania) Liești Commune
President	(Romania) Marcel Scarlat
Sporting director	(Romania) Dorinel Matei

=== Current technical staff ===
Role	Name
Manager	(Romania) Cătălin Savu
Assistant managers	(Romania) Cristian Brăneț (Romania) Daniel Lovin
Goalkeeping coach	(Romania) Ionuț Crihană
Fitness coach	(Romania) Doru Buciumeanu

== League history ==
Season	Tier	Division	Place	Notes	Cupa României
2025–26	3	Liga III (Seria II)	TBD		Group Stage
2024–25	3	Liga III (Seria II)	2nd		
2023–24	3	Liga III (Seria II)	4th		
2022–23	3	Liga III (Seria II)	5th		
2021–22	3	Liga III (Seria II)	5th		
2020–21	3	Liga III (Seria II)	6th		
2019–20	3	Liga III (Seria I)	10th		
2018–19	3	Liga III (Seria I)	8th		Round of 32

Season	Tier	Division	Place	Notes	Cupa României
2017–18	3	Liga III (Seria I)	8th		
2016–17	3	Liga III (Seria I)	8th		
2015–16	3	Liga III (Seria I)	6th		
2014–15	3	Liga III (Seria I)	10th		
2013–14	3	Liga III (Seria II)	10th		
2012–13	4	Liga IV (GL)	1st (C)	Promoted	
2011–12	4	Liga IV (GL)	1st (C)		
2010–11	4	Liga IV (GL)	14th		

== Former managers ==
- (Romania) Doru Buciumeanu (2011–2014)
- (Romania) Valentin Kramer (2014–2015)
- (Romania) Ionuț Niculcea (2015–2019)
- (Romania) Doru Balmuș (2019)
- (Romania) Ionuț Niculcea (2020–2021)
- (Romania) Cristian Brăneț (2021–2022)
- (Romania) Cătălin Savu (2022–)
