= CSO Petrolul Potcoava =

Romanian football club

Petrolul Potcoava
- Full name: Clubul Sportiv Orășenesc Petrolul Potcoava
- Nicknames: Potcovenii (The people from Potcoava); Petroliștii (The Oilmen); Lupii galbeni (The Yellow Wolves)
- Short name: Potcoava
- Founded: 1950 as Unirea Potcoava
- Dissolved: 2025
- Ground: Petrolul
- Capacity: 500
- 2024–25: Liga III, Seria IV, 8th
Home colours	Away colours

Clubul Sportiv Orășenesc Petrolul Potcoava, also known as Petrolul Potcoava, or simply Potcoava was a Romanian football club based in Potcoava, Olt County. The team last competed in Liga III, the third tier of Romanian football.

== History ==
The club was founded in 1950 as Unirea Potcoava and competed in the Argeș Regional and District Championships. During the 1960s, it adopted the name Petrolul Potcoava, as Potcoava is known for its oil and gas deposits, with Ciurești Scaffold of the Romanian Petrol Company operating in the area. This led to local economic development and further highlighted the town's connection to the petroleum industry.

The team participated in the inaugural season of the Olt County Championship, finishing in 5th place and becoming a constant presence in the fourth division.

Petrolul finished as runners-up in the 2014–15 season, nineteen points behind the winners, AS Milcov. The following season, the team placed 5th, while in 2016–17, it finished 7th.

In the 2017–18 season, Petrolul appointed Cristian Vintilă as the new head coach and finished as runners-up, this time behind Vedița Colonești. The club secured 3rd place in the 2018–19 season, ending the campaign twenty-seven points behind champions CSM Slatina.

The 2019–2020 season was suspended in March 2020 due to the COVID-19 pandemic, with Cristian Vintilă’s team leading the standings at the time. Petrolul was declared county champion and promoted to Liga III without playing in the promotion play-off, as Unirea Țigănești, the Teleorman County winner, withdrew, and Minerul Costești, the Vâlcea County champion, had its COVID-19 tests rejected by the Romanian Football Federation.

In their first season in Liga III, Petrolul managed to finish in 8th place, and in the following seasons the club had ranking as follows: 8th in 2021–22, 7th in 2022–23 and 9th in the 2023–24, resulting in the relegation to fourth league. However, The Oilmen were spared from relegation due to withdrawal of other clubs from Liga III.

== Honours ==
Liga IV – Olt County

- Winners (1): 2019–20
- Runners-up (3): 1982–83, 2014–15, 2017–18

== League history ==
Season	Tier	Division	Place	Notes	Cupa României
2024–25	3	Liga III (Seria IV)	8th	Ceded place to A. Balș	Third round
2023–24	3	Liga III (Seria VI)	9th		Second Round
2022–23	3	Liga III (Seria VI)	7th		

Season	Tier	Division	Place	Notes	Cupa României
2021–22	3	Liga III (Seria VI)	8th		
2020–21	3	Liga III (Seria VI)	8th		
2019–20	4	Liga IV (OT)	1st (C)	Promoted	
