= ACS Șomuz Fălticeni =

Romanian football club

Șomuz Fălticeni
- Full name: Asociația Clubul Sportiv; Șomuz Fălticeni
- Nickname(s): Fălticenenii (The People from Fălticeni)
- Short name: Șomuz
- Founded: 15 July 2010; 15 years ago
- Ground: Constantin Jamaischi
- Capacity: 4,000
- Owner: Fălticeni Municipality
- Chairman: Cătălin Ungureanu
- League: not active at senior level
- 2024–25: Liga III, Seria I, 8th
- Website: http://somuzfalticeni.ro/
Home colours	Away colours

Asociația Clubul Sportiv Șomuz Fălticeni, commonly known as ACS Șomuz Fălticeni or Șomuz Fălticeni, is a Romanian professional football club based in Fălticeni, Suceava County.

Șomuz Fălticeni was established in 2010, in order to assure the continuity of football in Fălticeni (second most populous city of Suceava County) after the dissolution of its predecessors, Foresta Fălticeni and Juventus Fălticeni. It achieved promotion to Liga III for the first time in its history in 2018, following an unsuccessful attempt in 2016. In July 2025, the club closed down its senior team, which had been competing in Liga III, and announced it would continue operations only at the youth level.

== History ==
History of professional football in Fălticeni started in 1954, along with the establishment of Avântul Fălticeni. Avântul was better known over years as Foresta Fălticeni and was by far the most successful club based in this town, reaching the 1967 Cupa României Final (first club that achieved a Romanian Cup final from the third tier) and also promoted in the top-flight in 1997. After promotion, Foresta was moved to Suceava and subsequently returned to Fălticeni, in 2003, but just to be dissolved after a short time. Foresta's legacy was carried on by various clubs in the following 7 years, but no one obtained notable results, among them, probably the best known was Juventus Fălticeni (est. 2002 and dissolved in 2008).

ACS Șomuz Fălticeni was established on 15 July 2010 and subsequently enrolled in the Liga V. The ascension of Șomuz was not a very fast one, after the club won Liga V in 2012, it succeeded in winning the 4th division only in 2016, but missed the promotion to Liga III after a tough promotion play-off against FC Bistrița.

Șomuz won again Liga IV Suceava in 2018, then obtain a 6–0 victory on aggregate against Flacăra Muntenii de Sus in the promotion play-off, promoting for the first time in the Liga III. In their first two seasons, fălticenenii were ranked 11th and 9th (out of 16).

In July 2025, Șomuz withdrew from Liga III and disbanded its senior team to continue its activity only at youth level.

== Ground ==
Șomuz Fălticeni plays its home matches on Constantin Jamaischi Stadium in Fălticeni, Suceava County, with a capacity of 4,000 people (300 on seats). The stadium was renovated between 2017 and 2018 and now is the main stadium of the town. Foresta Fălticeni used to play its home matches on Nada Florilor Stadium, with a capacity of 10,000 people, on standing terrace. Nada Florilor Stadium had some structure problems since 1990s and after 2010 it was abandoned by the local authorities and Constantin Jamaischi Stadium was renovated instead.

Until 31 July 2020, Constantin Jamaischi Stadium was known as Tineretului Stadium, but it was renamed in the honor of Constantin Jamaischi former player of Rapid București, born in Fălticeni.

== Honours ==
- Liga IV – Suceava County
  - Winners (2): 2015–16, 2017–18
- Liga V – Suceava County
  - Winners (1): 2011–12

== Players ==
=== First team squad ===
As of 10 September 2024

Note: Flags indicate national team as defined under FIFA eligibility rules; some limited exceptions apply. Players may hold more than one non-FIFA nationality.

No.	Pos.	Nation	Player
1	GK	(Romania) ROU	Silviu Iederan
2	DF	(Romania) ROU	Teodor Cucolaș
3	DF	(Romania) ROU	Ionuț Maroșan
4	DF	(Romania) ROU	Teodor Amihăesei (on loan from Ceahlăul)
5	MF	(Romania) ROU	Emanuel Zaharia
6	DF	(Romania) ROU	Denis Lăcustă (on loan from Ceahlăul)
7	FW	(Romania) ROU	Alexandru Savin
8	MF	(Romania) ROU	Andrei Săhlean
9	FW	(Romania) ROU	Viorel Pătrășcan
10	MF	(Romania) ROU	Eduard Julei (Captain)

No.	Pos.	Nation	Player
11	MF	(Romania) ROU	Ionuț Plămadă (Vice-Captain)
12	GK	(Romania) ROU	Șerban Tomache (on loan from Botoșani)
13	FW	(Romania) ROU	Cătălin Vasiliu
16	MF	(Romania) ROU	Lucian Pop
17	DF	(Nigeria) NGA	Emmanuele Nwodu
20	FW	(Romania) ROU	Bogdan Grosu
21	MF	(Romania) ROU	David Toader
23	MF	(Romania) ROU	Iulian Buliga
25	MF	(Romania) ROU	Cosmin Monah
27	DF	(Romania) ROU	Florin Plămadă (3rd captain)

=== Out on loan ===
Note: Flags indicate national team as defined under FIFA eligibility rules; some limited exceptions apply. Players may hold more than one non-FIFA nationality.

No. / Pos. / Nation / Player	No. / Pos. / Nation / Player

== Club Officials ==
=== Board of directors ===
Role	Name
Owner	(Romania) Fălticeni Municipality
President	(Romania) Cătălin Ungureanu
Vice-President	(Romania) Dumitru Hreamătă
Sporting director	(Romania) Iulian Darabă
Team manager	(Romania) Eusebiu Furtună

=== Current technical staff ===
Role	Name
Manager	(Romania) Vasile Prisacă
Assistan coach	(Romania) Cătălin Vasiliu
Fitness coach	(Romania) Adrian Levițchi
Club Doctors	(Romania) Manuela Velicu (Romania) Cătălin Pînzaru
Kinetotherapist	(Romania) Maria Vaidner
Masseur	(Romania) Constantin Apetrei

== League history ==
Season	Tier	Division	Place	Cupa României
2024–25	3	Liga III (Seria I)	8th (R)	
2023–24	3	Liga III (Seria I)	5th	
2022–23	3	Liga III (Seria I)	6th	
2021–22	3	Liga III (Seria I)	6th	Round of 32
2020–21	3	Liga III (Seria I)	7th	
2019–20	3	Liga III (Seria I)	9th	
2018–19	3	Liga III (Seria I)	11th	
2017–18	4	Liga IV (SV)	1st (C, P)	

Season	Tier	Division	Place	Cupa României
2016–17	4	Liga IV (SV)	4th	
2015–16	4	Liga IV (SV)	1st (C)	
2014–15	4	Liga IV (SV)	5th	
2013–14	4	Liga IV (SV)	4th	
2012–13	4	Liga IV (SV)	10th	
2011–12	5	Liga V (SV)	1st (C, P)	
2010–11	5	Liga V (SV)	4th	
