= Dr. Sinkovits Stadium =

Romanian multi-use stadium

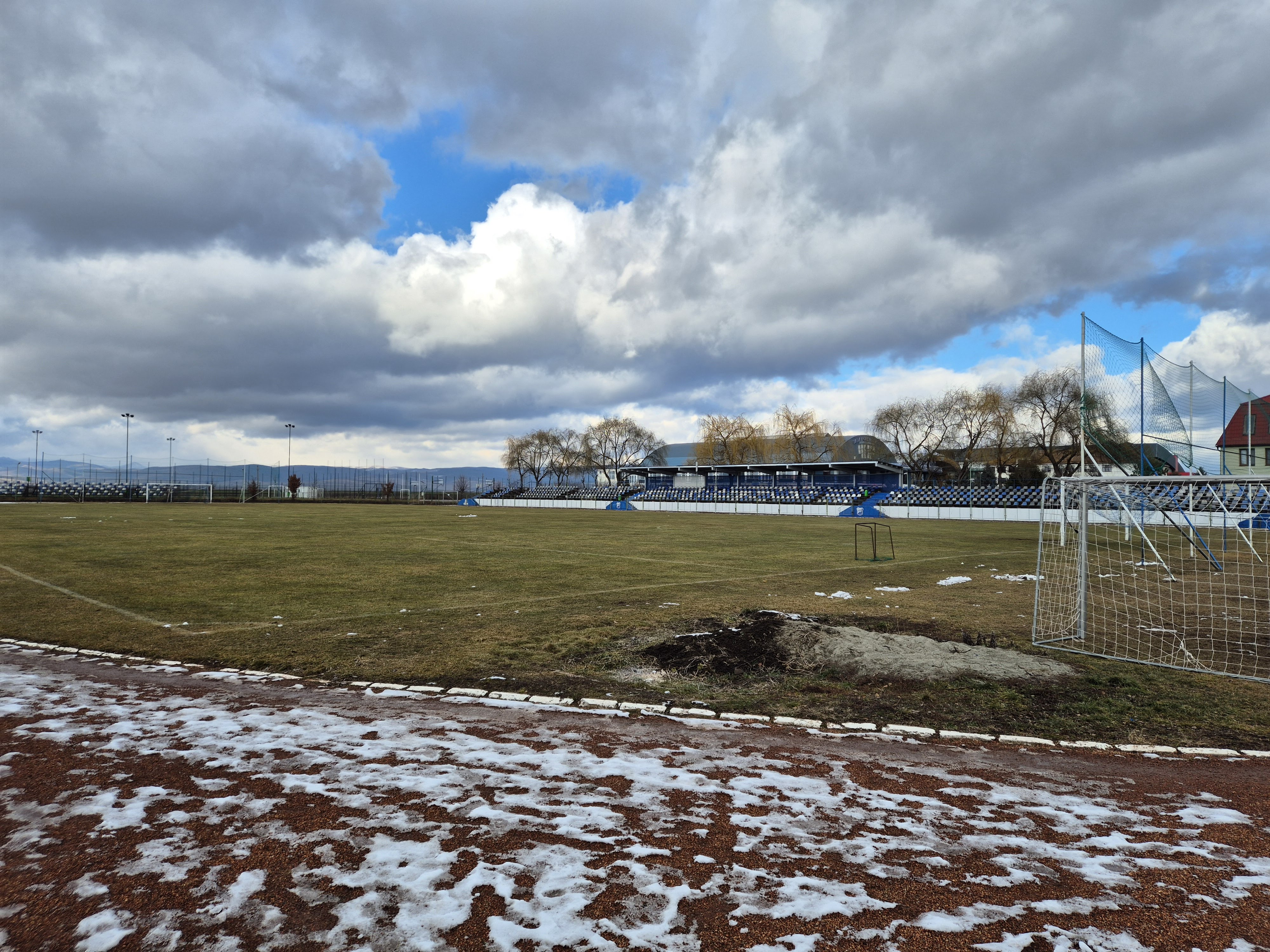
- Interactive map of Dr. Sinkovits Stadium
- Former names: Municipal
- Address: Str. Stadionului, nr. 11
- Location: Târgu Secuiesc, Romania
- Coordinates: 45°59′54.4″N 26°07′27.4″E
- Owner: Municipality of Târgu Secuiesc
- Operator: KSE Târgu Secuiesc
- Capacity: 800 seated
- Surface: Grass

Construction
- Opened: 1930
- Renovated: 2017–2018

Tenant
- KSE Târgu Secuiesc (1930–present)

The Dr. Sinkovits Stadium is a multi-use stadium in Târgu Secuiesc, Romania. It is used mostly for football matches and is the home ground of KSE Târgu Secuiesc. The stadium was opened in the 1930s, after Aurel Sinkovits donated the ground on 6 August 1929. Sinkovits was the former club doctor and for his generous donation, he was chosen as the eternal honorary president of KSE Târgu Secuiesc. The stadium was renamed Municipal Stadium during the communist period, then after the 2000s it was renamed again after Sinkovits.
