= Constantin Jamaischi Stadium =

Romanian stadium

- Interactive map of Constantin Jamaischi Stadium
- Former names: Tineretului
- Address: Str. Ioan Maior
- Location: Fălticeni, Romania
- Coordinates: 47°27′59.3″N 26°17′47.2″E
- Owner: Municipality of Fălticeni
- Operator: Șomuz Fălticeni
- Capacity: 4,000 (300 seated)
- Surface: Grass

Construction
- Opened: 1957
- Renovated: 2017–2018

Tenants
- CN Nicu Gane; Șomuz Fălticeni (2010–present)

The Constantin Jamaischi Stadium is a multi-use stadium in Fălticeni, Romania. It is used mostly for football matches and is the home ground of Șomuz Fălticeni. The stadium was opened in 1957 and was renovated between 2017 and 2018, after 60 years since its opening.

Foresta Fălticeni used to play its home matches on Nada Florilor Stadium, with a capacity of 10,000 people, on standing terrace. Nada Florilor Stadium was the main stadium of the town, but had some structure problems since 1990s and after 2010 it was abandoned by the local authorities and Constantin Jamaischi Stadium was renovated instead.

Until 31 July 2020, Constantin Jamaischi Stadium was known as Tineretului Stadium, but it was renamed in the honor of Constantin Jamaischi former player of Rapid București, born in Fălticeni.
