= Socodor =

- Commune
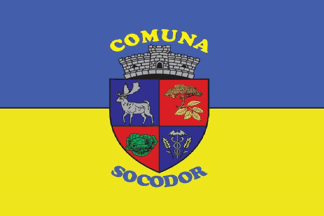
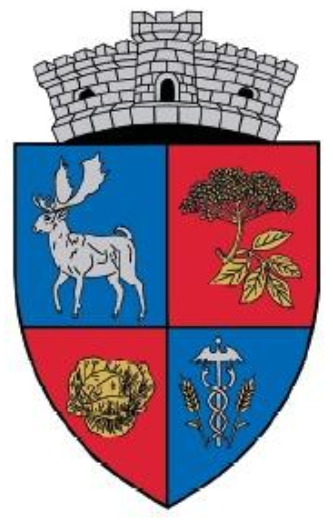
- Flag Coat of arms

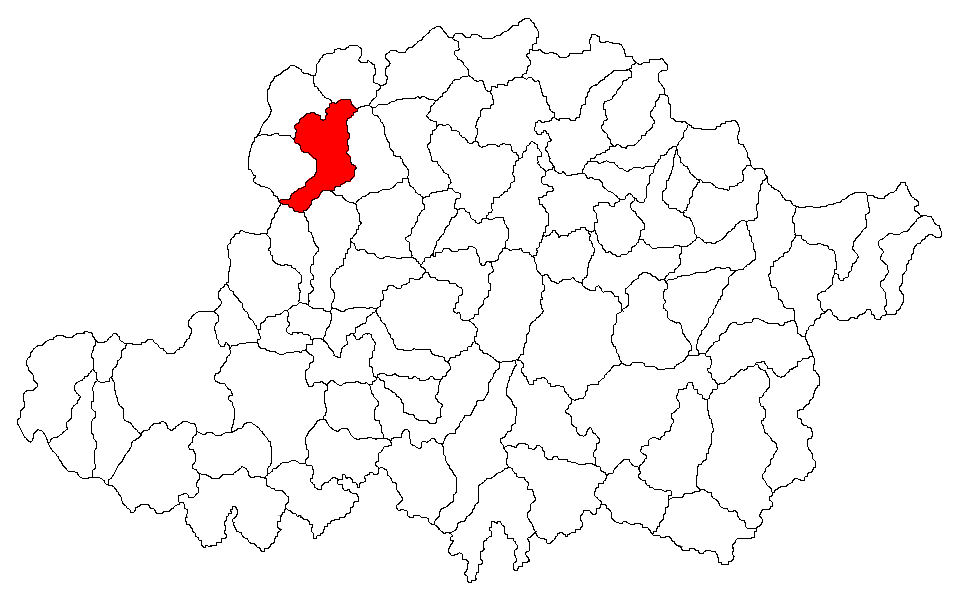
- Location in Arad County

- Location in Romania
- Coordinates: 46°31′N 21°26′E
- Country: Romania
- County: Arad
- Population (2021-12-01): 2,317
- Time zone: UTC+02:00 (EET)
  - Summer (DST): UTC+03:00 (EEST)
- Vehicle reg.: AR

Socodor (Hungarian: Székudvar) is a commune in Arad County, Romania. The commune is situated in the western part of the Crișul Alb Plateau and it stretches over 11260 ha. It is composed of a single village, Socodor, situated at 48 km from Arad.

== Population ==
According to the last census the population of the commune counts 2285 inhabitants, out of which 90.5% are Romanians, 5.6% Hungarians, 3.5% Roma and 0.4% are of other or undeclared nationalities.

== History ==
Although the first documentary record of Socodor dates from 1299, the traces of inhabitance on this area are lost in the darkness of time. Archaeologists have discovered ceramic objects belonging to the Osmanli culture, traces from the Bronze Age and two burial vaults belonging to the Avars.

== Economy ==
The economy of the commune is mainly agricultural, farming and livestock-breeding are well represented.

== Tourism ==
The natural reservation of alkali soil (95 ha), the valley of the Crișul Alb River and the church called "Buna Vestire" built in 1768 are the most attended sights of the commune.
