= Stadionul Victoria (Carei) =

Sports venue in Carei, Romania

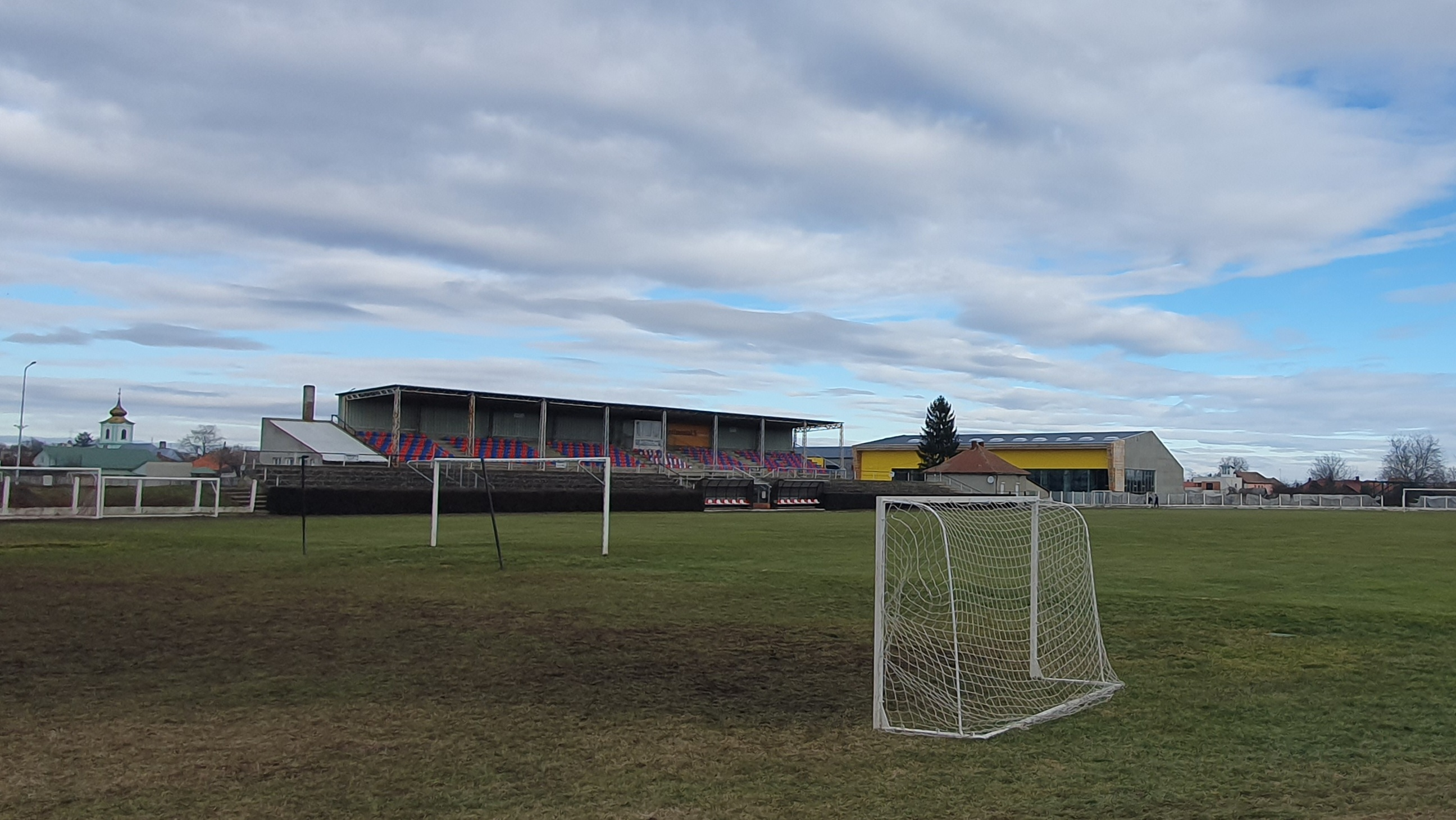
- Interactive map of Stadionul Victoria
- Address: Str. Stadionului
- Location: Carei, Romania
- Coordinates: 47°40′32.7″N 22°28′25″E
- Owner: Carei Municipality
- Operator: Victoria Carei
- Capacity: 4,000 (400 on seats)
- Surface: Grass

Construction
- Opened: 1920
- Renovated: 1970, 2022

Tenant
- Victoria Carei (1923–present)

Stadionul Victoria is a multi-use stadium in Carei, Romania. It is used mostly for football matches and is the home ground of Victoria Carei. The stadium holds 4,000 people, but only 400 on seats. The stadium was renovated most recently in 2022, when 400 seats were added.
