= Carl Davordzie =

Ghanaian professional footballer

Personal information
- Date of birth: 27 May 2000 (age 26)
- Place of birth: Accra, Ghana
- Position: Forward

Team information
- Current team: Sepsi OSK
- Number: 88

Youth career
- Perseverance Soccer Academy
- Perseverance Professionals FC
- 2018–2020: Parma

Senior career*
Years	Team	Apps	(Gls)
2020–2022	Virtus Camposanto		
2022–2024	CFR Cluj	0	(0)
2022–2024	→ Gloria Bistrița-Năsăud (loan)		
2024–2026	Ceahlăul Piatra Neamț	44	(20)
2026–	Sepsi OSK	21	(3)
- * Club domestic league appearances and goals as of 17 October 2026

Carl Davordzie (born 27 May 2000) is a Ghanaian professional footballer who plays as a forward for Liga I club Sepsi OSK.

== Youth career ==
Davordzie began his football career in his native Ghana, training at the Perseverance Soccer Academy and Perseverance Professionals FC. In 2018, he moved to Europe, joining the youth academy system of Italian club Parma. He spent two seasons playing for Parma's Primavera U19 squad.

== Club career ==
=== Parma and CFR Cluj ===
In August 2020, Davordzie was promoted to Parma's senior squad but did not make a competitive appearance for the first team. In August 2022, he moved to Romanian football, signing a contract with CFR Cluj. In September 2022, he was loaned in the Liga III on a long-term developmental loan to Gloria Bistrița to gain first-team playing time.

=== Ceahlăul Piatra Neamț ===
Following the expiration of his contract with CFR Cluj, Davordzie signed as a free agent with Liga II side Ceahlăul Piatra Neamț on 8 July 2024. He enjoyed a highly productive debut year during the 2024–25 season, scoring 11 goals in 29 appearances. He continued his form into the first half of the 2025–26 campaign, netting an additional 10 goals for Ceahlăul before drawing attention from top-flight suitors.

=== Sepsi OSK ===
In January 2026, Sepsi OSK signed Davordzie on a two-and-a-half-year contract that expires in June 2028. He took jersey number 88 and made an immediate impact, concluding the 2025–26 season with 13 total goals while helping Sepsi OSK obtain their promotion to the Liga I. Davordzie made his Liga I debut for Sepsi OSK in a 0–0 home draw against FCSB on 10 August 2026.

== Honours ==
Gloria Bistrița-Năsăud

- Liga III: 2023–24
