= KSE Târgu Secuiesc =

Romanian football club

- Full name: ACS KSE Târgu Secuiesc
- Nicknames: Alb-Albaștrii (The White and Blues); Székelyek (The Székelys)
- Short name: KSE
- Founded: 15 September 1912; 113 years ago 10 January 2002; 24 years ago (refounded)
- Ground: Dr. Sinkovits
- Capacity: 3,000
- Owner: Târgu Secuiesc Municipality
- Chairman: Lajos Rancz
- Manager: Liviu Negoiță
- League: Liga III
- 2025–26: Liga III, Seria I, 4th
Home colours	Away colours

Asociația Clubul Sportiv KSE Târgu Secuiesc, commonly known as KSE Târgu Secuiesc or KSE, is a Romanian professional football club based in Târgu Secuiesc, Covasna County.

KSE was founded in 1912 and is the second team from Covasna (a county with a majority of Székely ethnics) as ranking in the Romanian football, after Sepsi OSK Sfântu Gheorghe. Name of the club is a mix of Hungarian and Romanian, KSE (abbreviation for Kézdivásárhelyi Sportegyesület – Târgu Secuiesc Sports Association) and ACS Târgu Secuiesc (abbreviation for Asociația Club Sportiv Târgu Secuiesc – Târgu Secuiesc Sports Association).

== History ==
KSE Târgu Secuiesc was founded on 15 September 1912 thanks to the sports movement started by the students and craftsmen. At the inaugural meeting, the members unanimously elected Dr. Dénes Molnár (lawyer) as the president, Gyula Séra (public notary) and Kálmán Mina (chief of police) as the vice-presidents. KSE was set up with athletics and football departments and the first football match took place on 6 October 1912.

Until the 1940s, the "white and blues" played only at local and regional level, not having the financial strength to fight at a higher level. In August 1940, after the signing of the Second Vienna Award, Hungary annexed northern Transylvania, including Târgu Secuiesc and KSE was distributed in one of the Nemzeti Bajnokság II (Hungarian second division) series, the best rank in the history of the club, until now. Between 1941 and 1945, the club played only in the third tier, Nemzeti Bajnokság III, then after the return of Târgu Secuiesc between the borders of Romania, the team disappeared again from the national leagues.

During the 1950s and 1960s, the communists rebranded the club to eliminate its Hungarian influence and become a workers' club, fact that happened with many football clubs and sports associations in that period, especially based in Transylvania. KSE appeared for the first time in the Divizia C in 1970, under the name of Forestierul Târgu Secuiesc (Târgu Secuiesc Forestry).

Târgu Secuiesc would play constantly in the third division, for the next 12 years, under the name of Forestierul, then under the name of Metalul after the 1977 merge between Forestierul and Metalul or Izvorul after the 1978 merge with Izvorul Biborțeni. The best ranking of this period was a 5th place at the end of the 1971–72 season. In the rest of Divizia C editions, the club was ranked mainly in the middle or second part of the standings.

Name	Period
Kézdivásárhely SE	1912–1918
CS Târgu Secuiesc	1918–1940
Kézdivásárhely SE	1940–1945
Forestierul Târgu Secuiesc	1945–1977
Metalul Târgu Secuiesc	1977–1978
Izvorul Târgu Secuiesc	1978–1979
Metalul Târgu Secuiesc	1979–1994
Fortyogó Târgu Secuiesc	1994–2002
KSE Târgu Secuiesc	2002–present

In 1983, after only one season spent at amateur level, KSE return to the third division, under the name of Metalul Târgu Secuiesc, subsequently spending another eight seasons at that level. This period was a much more fruitful one for the team based in Covasna County, Metalul obtaining rankings in the middle or first part of the table, between 1985 and 1987 also registering the best period and rankings of the club in the Romanian football league system, three consecutive rankings on the 3rd place.

In the summer of 1992, Metalul withdrew from Divizia C due to lack of funds, then enrolled in the 4th division. In this period the club was reformed in order to bring back its Szekler roots. The reform of the club took place under the management of Mihály Csatlós, then Kálmán Debreczi and Dr. Olivér Boga. In 1998, "the Székelys" promoted back in the third tier, this time under the name of Fortyogó Târgu Secuiesc. Fortyogó relegated after only one season, then promoted again in 2000, just to relegate after another season spent in the third tier.

On 10 January 2002, the club was re-organized and a new management was elected, consisting of: Gyula Derzsi (president) and Levente Hodor (vice-president). During this general assembly the association was renamed again as KSE Târgu Secuiesc and the sports club that already included football, basketball and bowling sections was expanded with radio amateurs and chess sections. One year later, the mountaineering / caving and athletics departments were added in the sports society organizational chart.

KSE promoted to Divizia C in 2004, but relegated again after three weak seasons in which the club was a common name of the last places. After this relegation, for KSE followed one of the weakest periods in the club's history, "the white and blues" spending no less than 10 years in the county leagues. At the end of the 2016–17 season, KSE won Covasna County League, then the promotion play-off against Pro Mureșul Toplița (9–0 on aggregate) and returned, once again, in the Liga III.

== Ground ==
KSE Târgu Secuiesc plays its home matches on Dr. Sinkovits Stadium in Târgu Secuiesc, Covasna County, with a capacity of 3,000 seats. The ground on which is now situated the stadium was donated by Dr. Aurel Sinkovits, on 6 August 1929. Dr. Sinkovits was the former club doctor and for its generous donation, he was chosen as the eternal honorary president of KSE.

== Honours ==
Liga IV – Covasna County

- Winners (6): 1969–70, 1983–84, 1997–98, 1999–2000, 2003–04, 2016–17

=== Other performances ===
- Appearances in Nemzeti Bajnokság II: 1
- Best finish in Nemzeti Bajnokság II: 3rd place in the 1940–41 season.
- Appearances in Liga III: 27
- Best finish in Liga III: 3rd place in the 1984–85, 1985–86 and 1986–87 seasons.

== Players ==
=== First team squad ===
As of 10 September 2024

Note: Flags indicate national team as defined under FIFA eligibility rules; some limited exceptions apply. Players may hold more than one non-FIFA nationality.

No.	Pos.	Nation	Player
1	GK	ROU	Gabriel Bunduc
2	DF	ROU	Raul Rusu
4	DF	ROU	Marius Burlacu
5	MF	ROU	Robert Vereș
6	MF	ROU	Ionuț Neamțu
7	MF	ROU	Alpár Gergely
8	MF	ROU	Raul Drugă
9	FW	ROU	Iulian Nechita
10	MF	ROU	Róbert Fábián
11	MF	ROU	Zsolt Dobos
12	GK	ROU	Szabolcs Csíki

No.	Pos.	Nation	Player
14	DF	ROU	Hunor Zöld
16	MF	ROU	Norbert Bárta
17	MF	ROU	Tamás Gajdó (Captain)
18	DF	ROU	Rareș Cranțea
19	MF	ROU	Álmos Bandi
21	MF	ROU	Zalán Fülöp
30	GK	ROU	Mihai Butuza
32	MF	ROU	Flavius Clinciu
69	DF	ROU	Attila Albu
75	DF	ROU	Bogdan Cîrstian

=== Out on loan ===
Note: Flags indicate national team as defined under FIFA eligibility rules; some limited exceptions apply. Players may hold more than one non-FIFA nationality.

No. / Pos. / Nation / Player	No. / Pos. / Nation / Player

== Club officials ==
=== Board of directors ===
Role	Name
Owner	(Romania) Târgu Secuiesc Municipality
President	(Romania) Lajos Rancz
Vice-President	(Romania) Csaba Niczuly
Head of Youth Center	(Hungary) Árpád Purguly
Organizer of Competitions	(Romania) József Májai

=== Current technical staff ===
Role	Name
Manager	(Romania) Liviu Negoiță
Assistant coach	(Romania) Gabriel Bunduc

== League history ==
Season	Tier	Division	Place	Cupa României
2025–26	3	Liga III (Seria II)	TBD	
2024–25	3	Liga III (Seria II)	3rd	
2023–24	3	Liga III (Seria V)	8th	
2022–23	3	Liga III (Seria V)	10th	
2021–22	3	Liga III (Seria V)	6th	First Round
2020–21	3	Liga III (Seria V)	6th	
2019–20	3	Liga III (Seria I)	11th	

Season	Tier	Division	Place	Cupa României
2018–19	3	Liga III (Seria I)	9th	
2017–18	3	Liga III (Seria I)	9th	
2016–17	4	Liga IV (CV)	1st (C, P)	
2015–16	4	Liga IV (CV)	4th	
2014–15	4	Liga IV (CV)	7th	
2013–14	5	Liga V (CV)	3rd (P)	
2012–13	4	Liga IV (CV)	16th (R)	
