= Ionuț Zaina =

Romanian footballer

Personal information
- Full name: Ionuț Bogdan Zaina
- Date of birth: 25 January 1994 (age 32)
- Place of birth: Bucharest, Romania
- Position: Midfielder

Youth career
- Rapid București

Senior career*
| Years | Team | Apps | (Gls) |
| 2014–2016 | CS Ștefănești | | |
| 2016 | Unirea Tărlungeni | 19 | (1) |
| 2017 | Pandurii Târgu Jiu | 14 | (0) |
| 2017–2018 | Șirineasa | | |
| 2018–2019 | Popești-Leordeni | | |
- * Club domestic league appearances and goals as of 9 September 2018

Ionuț Bogdan Zaina (born 25 January 1994) is a Romanian professional footballer who plays as a midfielder.
