= Liviu Negoiță (footballer) =

Romanian professional footballer

Liviu Negoiţă
Personal information
- Full name: Giani Liviu Negoiţă
- Date of birth: 8 May 1977 (age 49)
- Place of birth: Brașov, Socialist Republic of Romania
- Height: 1.82 m (6 ft 0 in)
- Position: Left midfielder

Team information
- Current team: KSE Târgu Secuiesc (manager)

Youth career
- 1987–1994: ICIM Brașov

Senior career*
Years	Team	Apps	(Gls)
1994–1997	ICIM Brașov	3	(0)
1997–2001	Petrolul Ploiești	99	(4)
2001–2003	Astra Ploiești	57	(1)
2003–2004	Petrolul Ploiești	27	(7)
2004–2006	Argeș Pitești	37	(1)
2006	Unirea Urziceni	15	(0)
2007	Ceahlăul Piatra Neamț	6	(0)
2007–2008	Dacia Mioveni	15	(0)
2008–2010	Petrolul Berca		
Total		259	(13)

Managerial career
- 2010–2011: Voluntari (assistant)
- 2012–2013: Voluntari (assistant)
- 2019–2021: Corona Brașov (assistant)
- 2023–2024: Kids Tâmpa Brașov
- 2024–: KSE Târgu Secuiesc
- * Club domestic league appearances and goals as of 15:24, 5 December 2024 (UTC)

Giani Liviu Negoiţă (born 8 May 1977) is a Romanian former professional footballer who played for teams such as Petrolul Ploiești, Astra Ploiești and FC Argeș Pitești, among others.
