= Șuțești =

- Commune
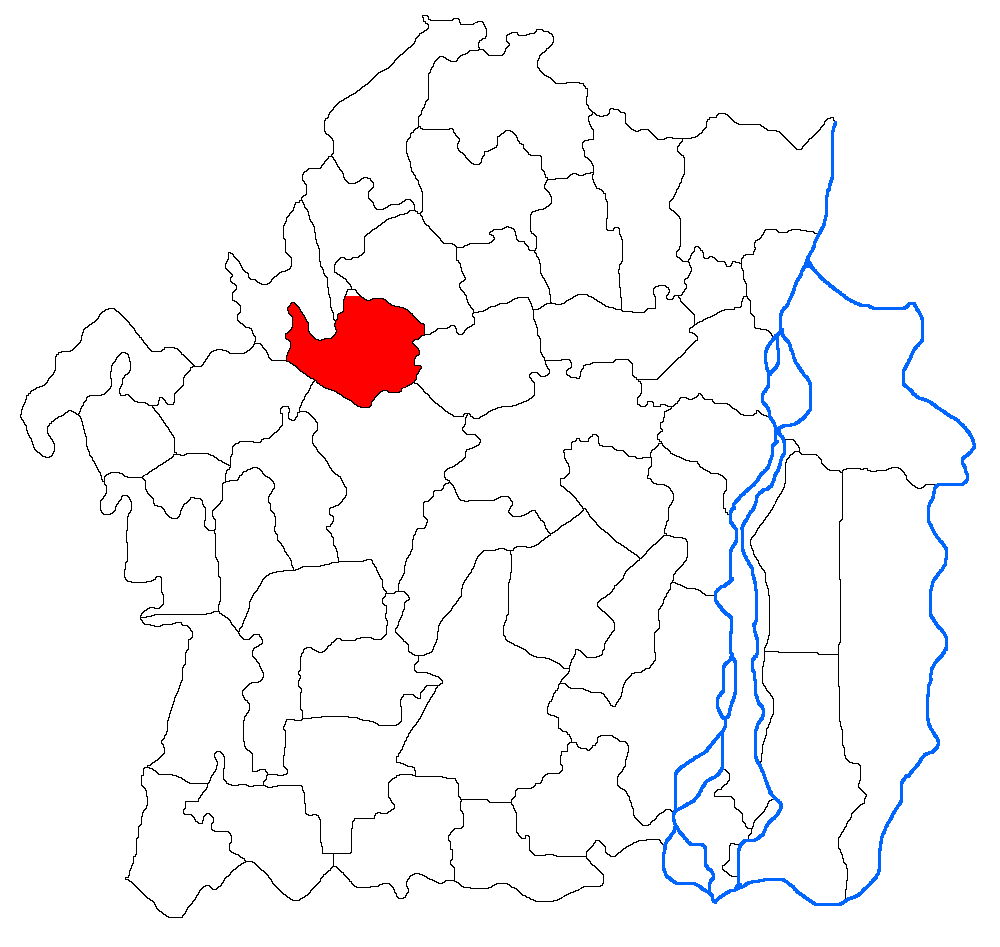
- Location in Brăila County

- Location in Romania
- Coordinates: 45°13′N 27°26′E
- Country: Romania
- County: Brăila

Government
  - Mayor (2020–2024): Costică Dobre (PSD)
- Area: 88.68 km^{2} (34.24 sq mi)
- Elevation: 37 m (121 ft)
- Population (2021-12-01): 3,945
  - Density: 44/km^{2} (120/sq mi)
- Time zone: EET/EEST (UTC+2/+3)
- Postal code: 817165
- Area code: +(40) 239
- Vehicle reg.: BR
- Website: www.primariasutesti.ro

Șuțești is a commune located in Brăila County, Muntenia, Romania. It is composed of two villages, Mihail Kogălniceanu and Șuțești.

== Natives ==
- Neagu Bratu (born 1935), sports shooter
