= Central-Parc Stadium =

Multi-purpose stadium in Ineu, Romania

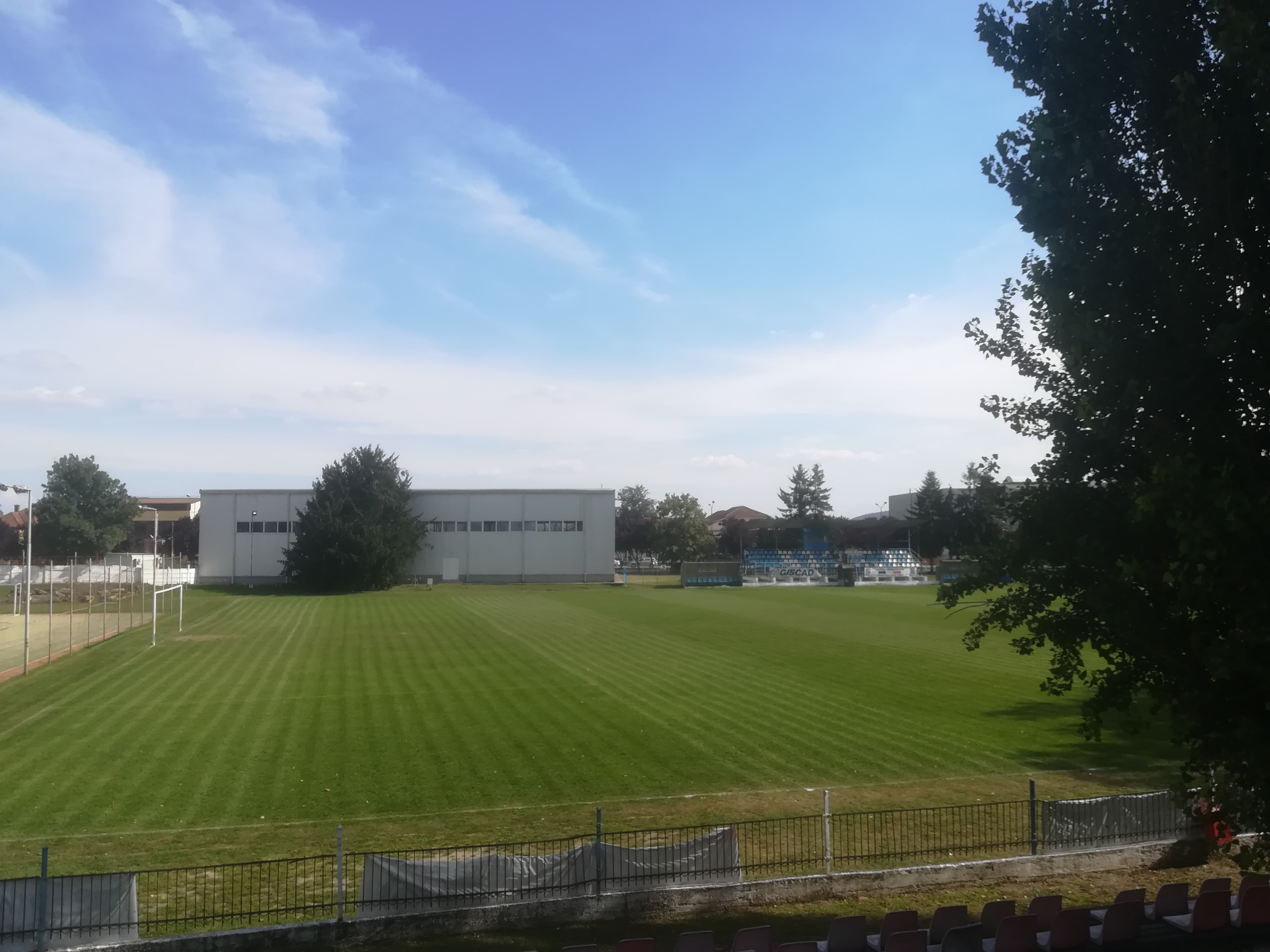
- Interactive map of Central-Parc Stadium
- Address: Calea Aradului (DJ792)
- Location: Ineu, Romania
- Coordinates: 46°25′28.7″N 21°49′57.9″E
- Owner: Town of Ineu
- Operator: ACB Ineu
- Capacity: 3,000 seated
- Surface: Grass

Construction
- Opened: 1920

Tenant
- ACB Ineu (1920–present)

The Central-Parc Stadium is a multi-purpose stadium in Ineu, Romania. It is currently used mostly for football matches and is the home ground of CS Ineu. The stadium holds 3,000 people and was for 85 years the home ground of Tricotaje Ineu.
