= CS Victoria Ineu =

Romanian football club

Victoria Ineu
- Full name: Club Sportiv Victoria Ineu
- Nicknames: Ineuanii (The people from Ineu)
- Short name: Ineu
- Founded: 1920; 106 years ago as Victoria Ineu; 2005; 21 years ago as CS Ineu
- Ground: Central-Parc
- Capacity: 3,000
- Owner: Ineu Town
- Chairman: Cristian Urzică
- Manager: Dacian Zdrențan
- League: Liga IV
- 2025–26: Liga V, Arad County, 1st (promoted)
Home colours	Away colours

Club Sportiv Victoria Ineu, commonly known as Victoria Ineu, is a Romanian football club from Ineu, Arad County and currently playing in Liga IV – Arad County, the sixth tier of the Romanian football.

Founded in 1920, Victoria Ineu has had several names over time such as Progresul, Spartac, Crișul, CS Ineu, Tricotaje and ACB. The club reached the Divizia B as Tricotaje Ineu, playing in the Romanian second division in 2003–04 and 2004–05, finishing in 9th position in both campaigns.

== History ==
Victoria Ineu was founded in April 1920 at the initiative of a group of intellectuals from Ineu at that time, by creating football, athletics and gymnastics teams. The team played in the district, regional and county championships between 1946 and 1978.

Victoria managed to win the county championship at the end of the 1977–78 season and the promotion play-off against CFR Caransebeș, the winner of the Caraș-Severin County Championship, with 2–2 on aggregate (1–2 away and 1–0 at home) and were promoted on the away goals rule.

In the first three years in Divizia C, Ineuanii struggled to avoid relegation, finishing 12th in the 1978–79 season and 13th in both the 1979–80 and 1980–81 seasons. The following season, 1981–82, ended with a mid-table finish in 8th place.

Preceded by two more years in the mid-table, finishing 11th in the 1982–83 season and 10th in the 1983–84 season, relegation to the fourth division came after the 1984–85 season, when finishing in 15th place.

In 1985, Victoria Ineu also reached the Round of 32 of the Cupa României, losing 0–3 to FC Olt Scornicești. The lineup in that match was: Țica I (Csillag) – Costin, Szabo, Maghiș (Weckerle), Reisz – Sas, Popa, Leucuța – Țica II, Nicodin and Rusan, with Ioan Palcu as head coach.

In 1986, in an attempt to make a comeback to the third division, Victoria merged with two other teams from the town, Metalul and Gloria, forming CS Ineu. The club won the Arad County Championship in the 1988–89 season but lost the promotion play-off against Minerul Ștei, the Bihor County Championship winner, with a 0–1 loss at Ștei and a 0–0 draw at Ineu.

Chronology of names
Name	Period
1920–1986	Victoria Ineu
1986–2000	CS Ineu
2000–2005	Tricotaje Ineu
2005–2020	CS Ineu
2020–2024	ACB Ineu
2024–present	Victoria Ineu

The 2000–01 season marks the long-awaited return of Ineu to Liga III. With Alexandru Gaica on the bench, Tricotaje Ineu (named after the knitwear factory in town) won the Divizia D – Arad County and defeated CS Vulcan, the Divizia D – Hunedoara County winner, 2–1 in the promotion play-off held at Timișoara.

In 2005, Tricotaje Ineu sold its place in Divizia B to FCM Reșița and bought the place in the third tier of Universitatea Reșița and renamed as CS Ineu.

In the summer of 2020, CS Ineu started a collaboration with Brosovszky Football Academy and was renamed as ACB Ineu.

== Honours ==
Liga III

- Runners-up (2): 2002–03, 2008–09

Liga IV – Arad County

- Winners (5): 1977–78, 1988–89, 2000–01, 2012–13, 2021–22
- Runners-up (2): 1972–73, 2020–21

Cupa României – Arad County

- Winners (1): 1994–95

== Club officials ==
=== Board of directors ===
Role	Name
Owner	(Romania) Ineu Town
President	(Romania) Cristian Urzică
Sporting director	(Romania) Ioan Benea

=== Current technical staff ===
Role	Name
Manager	(Romania) Dacian Zdrențan
Assistant coach	(Romania) Cătălin Bun

== League history ==
Season	Tier	Division	Place	Notes	Cupa României
2024–25	6	Liga VI (AR)	TBD		
2023–24	3	Liga III (Seria VIII)	10th	Relegated	
2022–23	3	Liga III (Seria VIII)	9th		
2021–22	4	Liga IV (AR)	1st (C)	Promoted	
2020–21	4	Liga IV (AR)	2nd		
2019–20	4	Liga IV (AR)	10th		
2018–19	4	Liga IV (AR)	7th		
2017–18	4	Liga IV (AR)	4th		
2016–17	4	Liga IV (AR)	14th		

Season	Tier	Division	Place	Notes	Cupa României
2015–16	3	Liga III (Seria IV)	11th	Relegated	
2014–15	3	Liga III (Seria IV)	9th		
2013–14	3	Liga III (Seria V)	5th		
2012–13	4	Liga IV (AR)	1st (C)	Promoted	
2011–12	4	Liga IV (AR)	8th		
2010–11	4	Liga IV (AR)	6th		
2009–10	3	Liga III (Seria V)	13th	Relegated	
2008–09	3	Liga III (Seria V)	2nd		
2007–08	3	Liga III (Seria V)	12th		

== Former managers ==
- (Romania) Ionuț Popa (1985–1987)
- (Romania) Sorin Cigan (2002–2003)
- (Romania) Sorin Cigan (2004)
