= Stadionul CFR (Pașcani) =

Sports venue in Pașcani, Romania

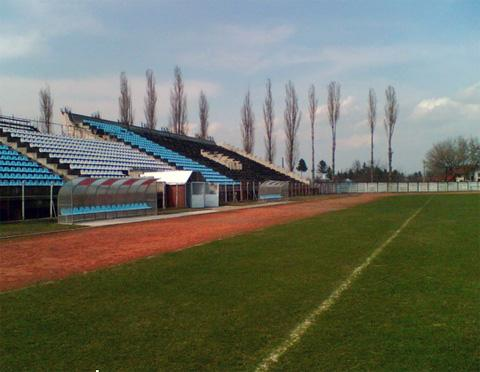
- The stadium in 2009
- Interactive map of Stadionul CFR
- Address: Str. Stadionului, nr. 1
- Location: Pașcani, Romania
- Coordinates: 47°15′0.08″N 26°42′39.52″E
- Owner: Municipality of Pașcani
- Operator: CSM Pașcani
- Capacity: 3,500 seated
- Surface: Grass

Construction
- Opened: 1920s

Tenant
- CSM Pașcani (1924–present)

Stadionul CFR is a multi-purpose stadium in Pașcani, Romania. It is currently used mostly for football matches and is the home ground of CSM Pașcani. The stadium holds 3,500 people.
