= Liești =

- Commune
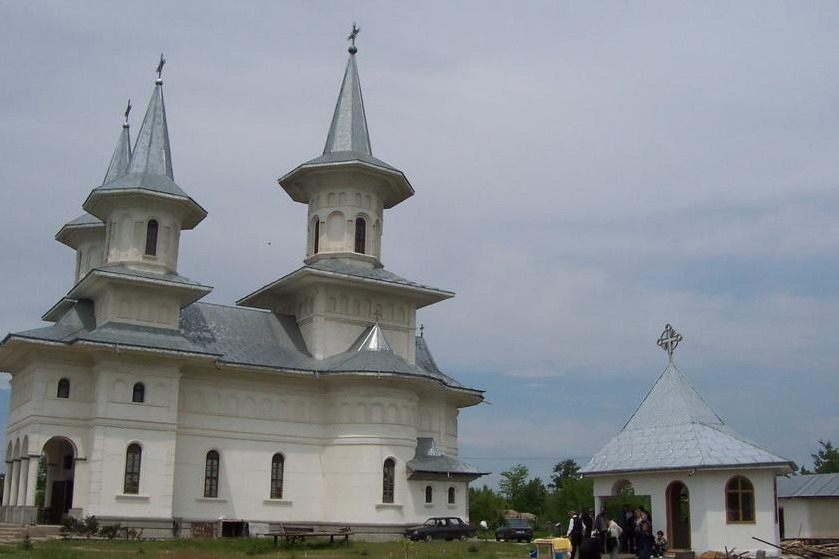
- St Nicholas Church, Liești

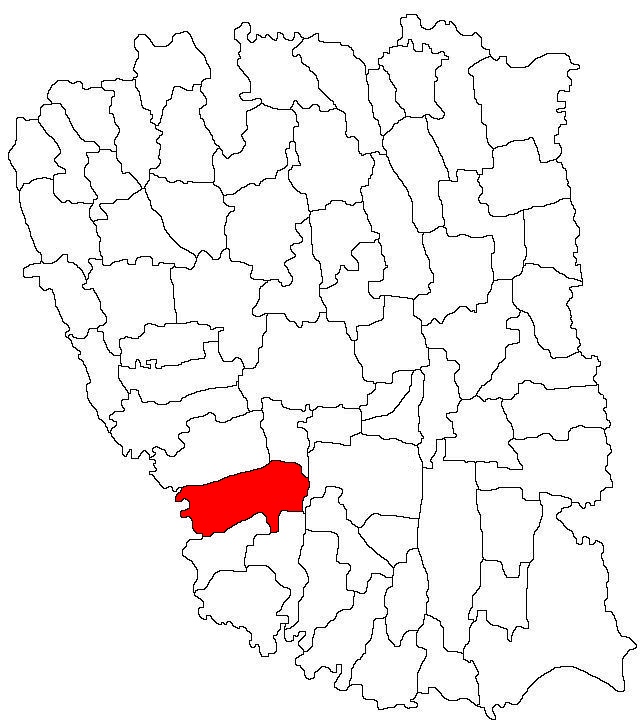
- Location in Galați County

- Location in Romania
- Coordinates: 45°37′9.5″N 27°32′29.6″E
- Country: Romania
- County: Galați

Government
  - Mayor (2020–2024): Iulian Boț (PNL)
- Area: 89.12 km^{2} (34.41 sq mi)
- Population (2021-12-01): 8,505
  - Density: 95.43/km^{2} (247.2/sq mi)
- Time zone: UTC+02:00 (EET)
  - Summer (DST): UTC+03:00 (EEST)
- Vehicle reg.: GL
- Website: www.primaria-liesti.ro

Liești is the third-largest commune of Galați County, Western Moldavia, Romania on the confluence of the Siret and Bârlad rivers, very close to Tecuci (28 km) and Galați (52 km). It is composed of two villages, Liești and Șerbănești. The latter is the southernmost part of the commune.

== Name ==
The name of the commune appears to be derived from Ilie, which means Elijah, probably a local, which seems to be the brother of Șerban, the father of Șerbănești.

== History ==
The first mention of the village dates from 1448, when in the prince of Moldavia, Petru II, who gives as a gift to the local nobleman Cernat Ploscarul and to his brother, Ștefu, 40 villages and fields among which appear Liești and Șerbănești.

== Tourism ==
Liești has several Romanian Orthodox churches – St. Parascheva (c. 1886), Dormition of the Virgin (1889), and St. Nicholas (built after 1990)- the seat of the Protopopiate (archpriest's district) of Nicorești. Other attractions include the acacia forests near the village (especially in May) and the valleys of the rivers Siret and Bârlad.

== Education ==
Lieşti has four schools: one which teaches until the tenth grade, and three that teach until the eighth grade. Liești also has four kindergartens and a 14,000-volume public library.

== Economy ==
The village has a sugar factory (Lemarco Bucharest), but the majority of the population works in local agriculture or in siderurgy at the Siderurgical Combinate Mittal Steel from Galați. Beginning around 2000, many people from the region have gone to work in Italy or Spain, where wages are higher.

== Climate ==
The climate of Liești is Humid continental (Dfb):

Climate data for Liești
Month	Jan	Feb	Mar	Apr	May	Jun	Jul	Aug	Sep	Oct	Nov	Dec	Year
Mean daily maximum °C (°F)	1.1 (34.0)	3.1 (37.6)	9.2 (48.6)	16.8 (62.2)	22.5 (72.5)	26.0 (78.8)	27.9 (82.2)	27.5 (81.5)	23.6 (74.5)	17.0 (62.6)	9.4 (48.9)	3.5 (38.3)	15.6 (60.1)
Daily mean °C (°F)	−2.2 (28.0)	−0.3 (31.5)	4.6 (40.3)	11.2 (52.2)	16.7 (62.1)	20.2 (68.4)	21.9 (71.4)	21.4 (70.5)	17.6 (63.7)	11.6 (52.9)	5.5 (41.9)	0.5 (32.9)	10.7 (51.3)
Mean daily minimum °C (°F)	−5.5 (22.1)	−3.7 (25.3)	0.1 (32.2)	5.7 (42.3)	11.0 (51.8)	14.4 (57.9)	16.0 (60.8)	15.4 (59.7)	11.6 (52.9)	6.2 (43.2)	1.7 (35.1)	−2.4 (27.7)	5.9 (42.6)
Average precipitation mm (inches)	28 (1.1)	29 (1.1)	27 (1.1)	40 (1.6)	56 (2.2)	70 (2.8)	55 (2.2)	48 (1.9)	43 (1.7)	28 (1.1)	34 (1.3)	31 (1.2)	489 (19.3)
Source: Climate-data.org

== Notable people ==
- Antonel Borșan (born 1970), sprint canoer
- Anghel Saligny (1854–1925), engineer who designed the Anghel Saligny Bridge (1895) over the Danube, the longest bridge in Europe at the time
