= Ștefăneștii de Jos =

- Commune
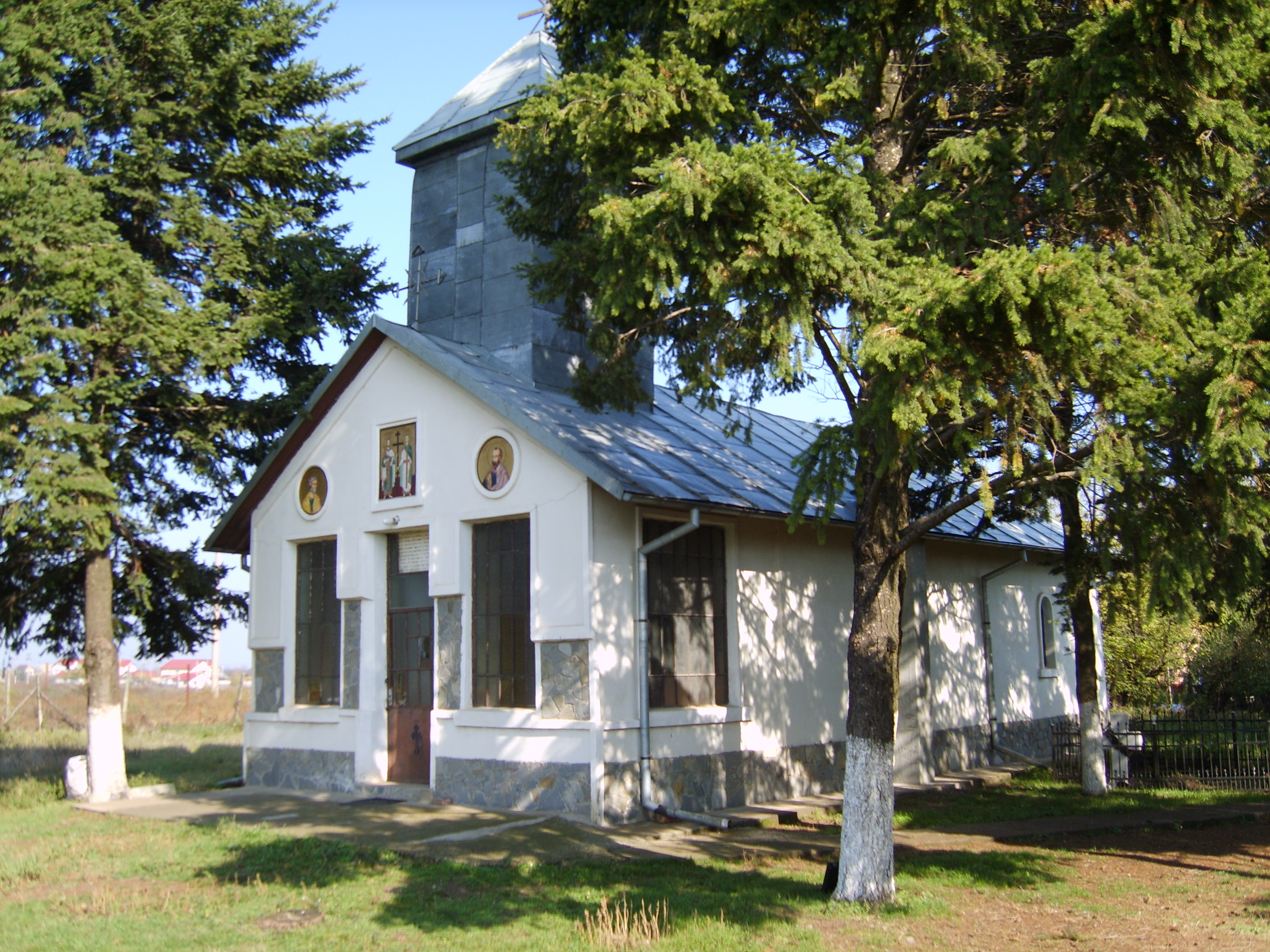
- Church in Crețuleasca

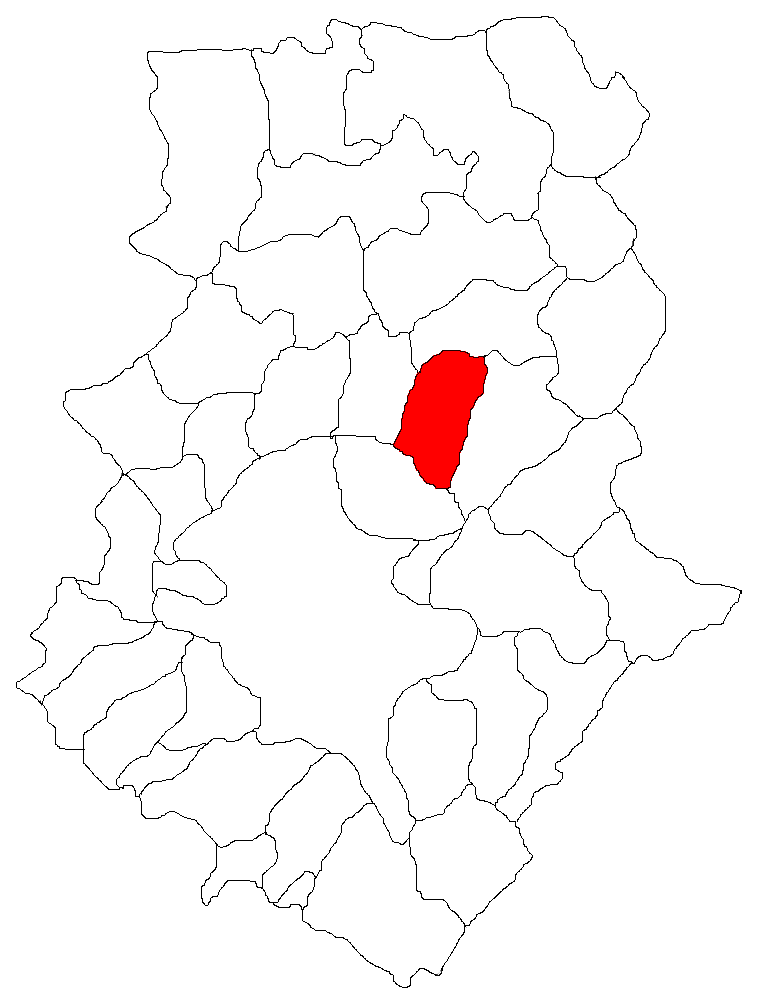
- Location in Ilfov County

- Location in Romania
- Coordinates: 44°32′N 26°12′E
- Country: Romania
- County: Ilfov

Government
  - Mayor (2024–2028): Virgiliu Mircea Daniel Gheorghiță (PNL)
- Area: 29 km^{2} (11 sq mi)
- Elevation: 86 m (282 ft)
- Population (2021-12-01): 10,588
  - Density: 370/km^{2} (950/sq mi)
- Time zone: UTC+02:00 (EET)
  - Summer (DST): UTC+03:00 (EEST)
- Postal code: 077175
- Area code: +(40) 21
- Vehicle reg.: IF
- Website: primariastefanesti.ro

Ștefăneștii de Jos is a commune in the centre of Ilfov County, Muntenia, Romania. Its name means "Lower Ștefănești", derived from Ștefan (Stephan) and suffix -ești. The commune is composed of three villages: Crețuleasca, Ștefăneștii de Jos, and Ștefăneștii de Sus.

Historical population
Year	Pop.	±%
2002	4,131	—
2011	5,775	+39.8%
2021	10,588	+83.3%
Source: Census data
