= Potcoava =

- Town
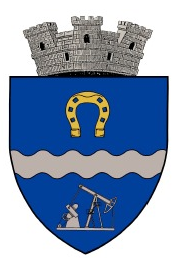
- Coat of arms

- Location in Romania
- Coordinates: 44°29′0″N 24°36′57″E
- Country: Romania
- County: Olt

Government
  - Mayor (2024–2028): Nicușor-Manuel Enăchioaia (PSD)
- Area: 65.27 km^{2} (25.20 sq mi)
- Elevation: 170 m (560 ft)
- Population (2021-12-01): 5,229
  - Density: 80.11/km^{2} (207.5/sq mi)
- Time zone: UTC+02:00 (EET)
  - Summer (DST): UTC+03:00 (EEST)
- Postal code: 237355
- Area code: (+40) 02 49
- Vehicle reg.: OT
- Website: primariapotcoava.judetulolt.ro

Historical population
Year	Pop.	±%
2002	6,111	—
2011	5,743	−6.0%
2021	5,229	−9.0%
Source: Census data

Potcoava is a town in Olt County, Muntenia, Romania. The town administers four villages: Potcoava-Fălcoeni, Sinești, Trufinești and Valea Merilor.

The town is located in the northeastern part of the county, 30 km (19 mi) east of the county seat, Slatina.

At the 2021 census, Potcoava had a population of 5,229. At the 2011 census, it had a population of 5,743 people; of those, 87.65% were Romanians and 7.23% Roma.

== Natives ==
- Marian Anghelina (born 1991), footballer
- Lina Ciobanu (born 1929), communist politician
