= Peciu Nou =

- Commune
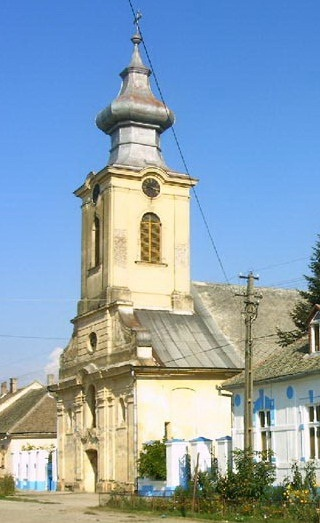
- The Roman Catholic church in Peciu Nou

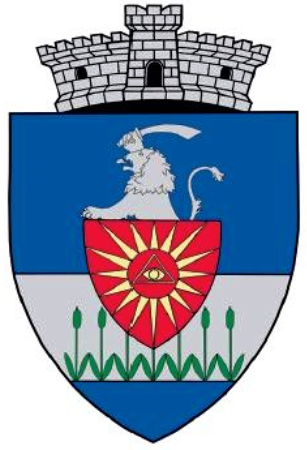
- Coat of arms

- Location in Timiș County

- Location in Romania
- Coordinates: 45°36′N 21°3′E
- Country: Romania
- County: Timiș

Government
  - Mayor (2016–): Gabriel-Răzvan Drăgan (PSD)
- Area: 135.25 km^{2} (52.22 sq mi)
- Population (2021-12-01): 4,931
  - Density: 36.46/km^{2} (94.43/sq mi)
- Time zone: UTC+02:00 (EET)
  - Summer (DST): UTC+03:00 (EEST)
- Postal code: 307310–307312
- Vehicle reg.: TM
- Website: primariapeciunou.ro

Peciu Nou (Serbian: Улбеч, romanized: Ulbeč; German: Ulmbach or Neuwien, "New Vienna"; Hungarian: Újpécs) is a commune in Timiș County, Romania. It is composed of three villages: Diniaș, Peciu Nou (commune seat) and Sânmartinu Sârbesc.

== History ==
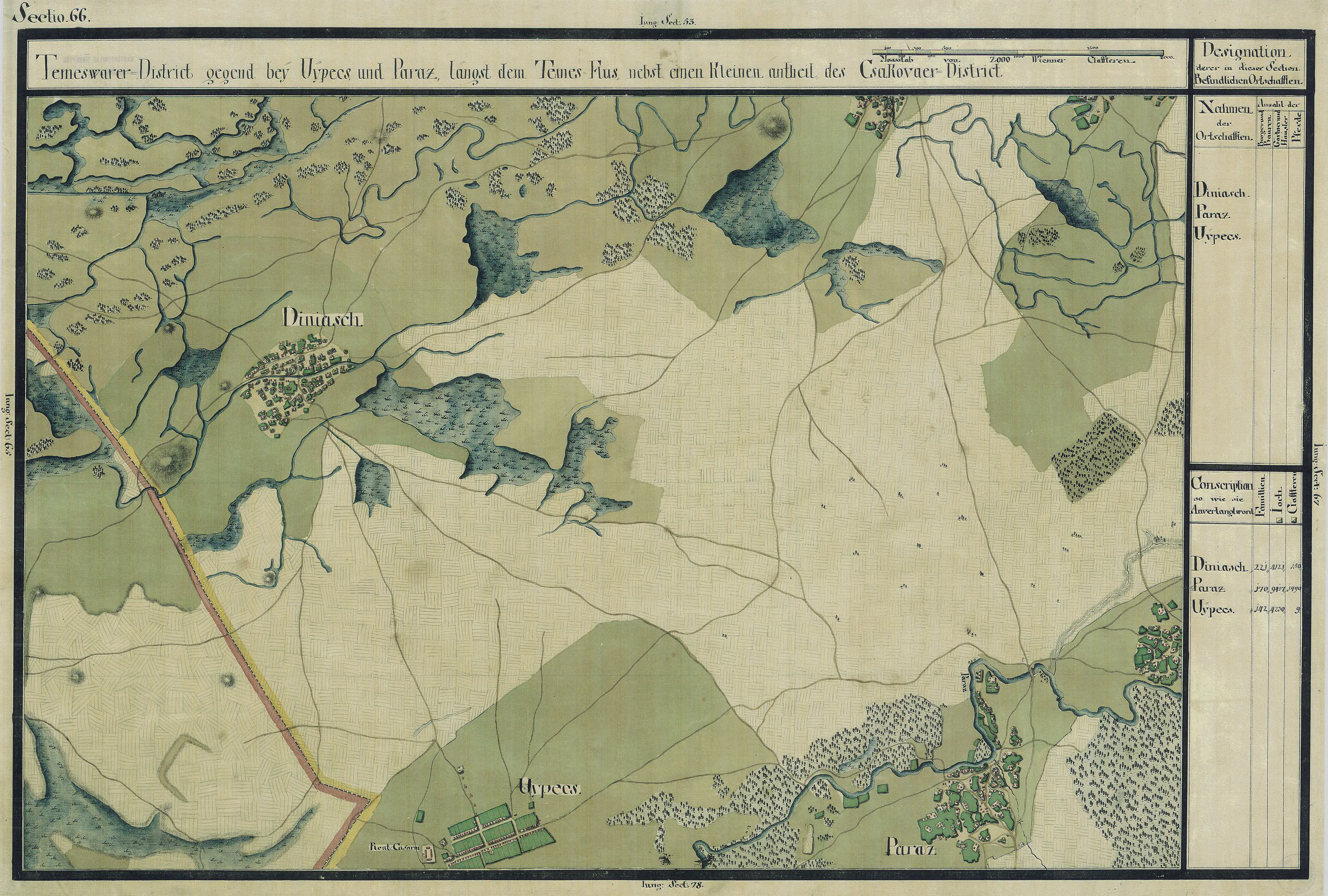
Peciu Nou (Uypecs) and Diniaș (Diniasch) on the Josephinische Landesaufnahme of 1769–1772

The territory of the commune has been inhabited since ancient times. During the Dacian statehood and the Roman rulership, a Roman colony was established here under the name Vibech. During the Migration Period, Peciu Nou fell under Hungarian rule; the first recorded mention of Peciu Nou also comes from this time (1332, Veybech). Between 1401–1406, the locality was a royal domain with urban status (opidum regis Vybech). In 1526 Hungary became a pashalik; after this period the sultan colonized many Serbs in Banat, and the name of the locality was changed from Vibech to Peciui.

The locality did not appear on Count Mercy's maps from 1723–1725, suggesting that the settlement was destroyed during the Ottoman–Habsburg wars. The first German settlers arrived here in 1723, mainly from Cologne and Mainz. The conscription (census) of 1743 noted a settlement with the name Uypez. At one time it was also called Neu Wien ("New Vienna").

== Demographics ==
Ethnic composition (2021)
1. Romanians (76.5%)
2. Serbs (8.37%)
3. Hungarians (1.37%)
4. Unknown (11.9%)
5. Others (1.85%)
Religious composition (2021)
1. Orthodox (66.7%)
2. Serbian Orthodox (7.60%)
3. Pentecostals (6.22%)
4. Roman Catholics (2.59%)
5. Greek Catholics (1.60%)
6. Unknown (12.4%)
7. Others (2.59%)
8. Irreligious, atheists and agnostics (0.30%)

Peciu Nou had a population of 4,931 inhabitants at the 2021 census, down 1.02% from the 2011 census. Most inhabitants are Romanians (76.55%), larger minorities being represented by Serbs (8.37%) and Hungarians (1.37%). For 11.86% of the population, ethnicity is unknown. By religion, most inhabitants are Orthodox (66.65%), but there are also minorities of Serbian Orthodox (7.6%), Pentecostals (6.22%), Roman Catholics (2.59%) and Greek Catholics (1.6%). For 12.45% of the population, religious affiliation is unknown.

Census		Ethnic composition
Year	Population	Romanians	Hungarians	Germans	Roma	Ukrainians	Serbs
1880	4,829	82	84	1,928	–	–	2,694
1890	5,549	40	102	2,314	–	1	3,079
1900	5,831	38	105	2,331	–	–	3,349
1910	5,862	94	138	2,301	–	–	3,304
1920	5,627	68	86	2,228	–	–	–
1930	5,639	127	96	2,124	20	–	3,263
1941	5,773	209	102	2,253	–	–	–
1956	5,794	1,454	108	1,387	37	–	2,801
1966	6,059	1,956	105	1,723	37	–	2,231
1977	5,946	2,249	114	1,610	88	62	1,810
1992	4,871	3,332	109	125	29	70	1,200
2002	4,992	3,773	113	53	43	80	926
2011	4,982	3,878	101	40	35	57	674
2021	4,931	3,775	68	18	27	29	413

== Politics and administration ==
The commune of Peciu Nou is administered by a mayor and a local council composed of 15 councilors. The mayor, Gabriel-Răzvan Drăgan, from the Social Democratic Party, has been in office since 2016. Since the 2024 local elections, the composition of the local council in terms of political parties' representation is the following:

Party	Seats	Composition
Social Democratic Party	7	
National Liberal Party	5	
Save Romania Union–People's Movement Party–Force of the Right	2	
Union of Serbs of Romania	1	

== Notable people ==
- Petre Stoica (1931–2009), poet and translator
