= Bogdănești =

Bogdănești may refer to several places in Romania:

- Bogdănești, Bacău, a commune in Bacău County
- Bogdănești, Suceava, a commune in Suceava County
- Bogdănești, Vaslui, a commune in Vaslui County
- Bogdănești, a village in Mogoș Commune, Alba County
- Bogdănești, a village in Vidra Commune, Alba County
- Bogdănești, a village in Scorțeni Commune, Bacău County
- Bogdănești, a village in Traian Commune, Bacău County
- Bogdănești, a village in Santa Mare Commune, Botoșani County
- Bogdănești, a village in Horlești Commune, Iași County
- Bogdănești, a village in Gornet Commune, Prahova County
- Bogdănești, a village in Fălciu Commune, Vaslui County
- Bogdănești, a village in Bujoreni Commune, Vâlcea County
- Bogdănești, a village in Oteșani Commune, Vâlcea County
- Bogdănești, a village in Tomșani Commune, Vâlcea County

and to:

- Bogdănești, a commune in Briceni district, Moldova
