= De Hirsh Margules =

American painter

- Self portrait
- Born: Isaac Edward Cecil De Hirsh De Tannerier Gilmont Margules; 1899; Iași, Romania
- Died: February 3, 1965; Greenwich Village, New York City, United States
- Known for: Painting, Poetry, Journalism
- Patrons: Alfred Stieglitz, Harrison D. Horblit

De Hirsh Margules (1899–1965) was a Romanian-born American "abstract realist" painter who crossed paths with many major American artistic and intellectual figures of the first half of the 20th century. Elaine de Kooning said that he was "[w]idely recognized as one of the most gifted and erudite watercolorists in the country".The New York Times critic Howard Devree stated in 1938 that "Margules uses color in a breath-taking manner. A keen observer, he eliminates scrupulously without distortion of his material." Devree later called Margules "one of our most daring experimentalists in the medium""

Margules was also a well-known participant in the bohemian culture of New York City's Greenwich Village, where he was widely known as the "Baron" of Greenwich Village. The New York Times described him as "one of Greenwich Village's best-known personalities" and "one of the best known and most buoyant characters about Greenwich Village."

== Early life ==
De Hirsh Margules was born in 1899 in the Romanian city of Iași (also known as Iasse, Jassy, or Jasse). When Margules was 10 weeks old, his family immigrated to New York City. Both of his parents were active in the Yiddish theater, His father was Yekutiel "Edward" Margules, a "renowned Jewish actor-impresario and founder of the Yiddish stage." Margules' mother, Rosa, thirty-nine years younger than his father, was an actress in the Yiddish theater and later in vaudeville. Although Margules appeared as a child actor with the Adler Family and Bertha Kalich, his sister, Annette Margules, somewhat dubiously continued in family theater and vaudeville tradition, creating the blackface role of the lightly-clad Tondelayo (a part later played on film Hedy Lamarr) in Earl Carroll's 1924 Broadway exoticist hit, White Cargo. (Annette herself faced stereotyping as an exotic flower: writing about her, publicist Charles Bouchert stated that "Romania produces a stormy, temperamental type of woman---a type admirably fitted to portray emotion.") His brother Samuel became a noted magician who appeared under the name "Rami-Sami." Samuel later became a lawyer, representing magician Horace Goldin, among others. A family portrait including a young De Hirsh, a portrait of Rosa and Annette together, and individual photos of Rosa and Edward can be found on the Museum of the City of New York website.

At around age 9 or 10, Margules took art classes with the Boys Club on East Tenth Street, and his first taste of exhibition was at a student art show presented by the club. By age 11, he had won a city-wide prize (a box camera) at a children's art show presented by the department store Wanamaker's.

As a young teenager, Margules was already displaying a characteristic kindness and loyalty. Upon hearing that two friends (one of them was author Alexander King), were in trouble for breaking a school microscope, the nearly broke Margules gave them five dollars to repair the microscope . Margules had to approach a wealthy man that Margules had once saved on the subway from a heart attack. Margules didn't reveal the source of the five dollars to King until twenty-five years later.

In his late teens, Margules studied for a couple of months in Pittsburgh with Edwin Randby, a follower of Western painter Frederic Remington. Thereafter he pursued a two-year course of studies in architecture, design and decoration at the New York Evening School of Art and Design, while working as a clerk during the day at Stern's Department Store. He was encouraged in these artistic pursuits by his neighbor, the painter Benno Greenstein (who later went by the name of Benjamin Benno).

== Artistic career ==
In 1922, Margules began work as a police reporter for the City News Association of New York . Margules then considered himself something of an expert on art, and the painter Myron Lechay is said to have responded to some unsolicited analysis of his work with the remark "Since you seem to know so much about it, why don't you paint yourself?" This led to study with Lechay and a flurry of painting.

Margules' first show was in 1922 at Jane Heap's Little Review Gallery. Thereafter Margules began to participate in shows with a group including Stuart Davis, Jan Matulka, Buckminster Fuller (exhibiting depictions of his "Dymaxion house") in a gallery run by art-lover and restaurateur Romany Marie on the floor above her cafe.

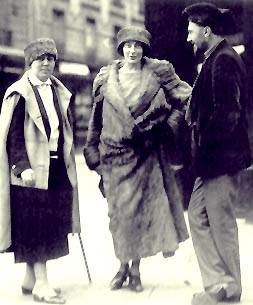
Jane Heap, left, with Mina Loy and Ezra Pound

During the 1920s, Margules traveled outside of the country a number of times. In 1922, with the intent of reaching Bali, he took a job as a "'wiper on a tramp steamer where [he] played nursemaid to the engine." He reached Rotterdam before he turned back. He would return to Rotterdam shortly thereafter.

In 1927, Margules took a lengthy leave of absence from his day job as a police reporter in order to travel to Paris, where he "set up a studio in Montmartre's Place du Tertre, on the top floor of an almost deserted hotel, a shabby establishment, lacking both heat and running water." He studied at the Louvre and traveled to paint landscapes in provincial France and North Africa.

Margules also joined the "Noctambulist" movement and experimented with painting and showing his artwork in low light. Jonathan Cott wrote that:

the painter De Hirsch Margulies sat on the quays of the Seine and painted pictures in the dark. In fact, the first exhibition of these paintings, which could be seen only in a darkened room, took place in [ Walter Lowenfels'] Paris apartment.

Elaine de Kooning remarked that studying the works of the Noctambulists confirmed Margules' "direction toward the use of primary colors for perverse effects of heavy shadow."

It was also in Paris that Margules initially conceived his idea of "Time Painting", where a painting is divided into sectors, each representing a different time of day, with color choices meant to evoke that time of day.

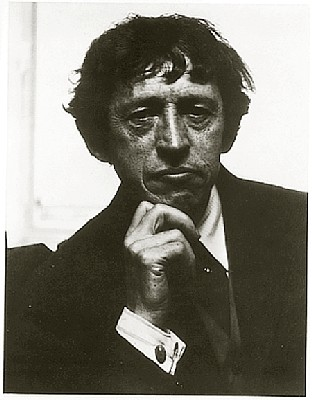
Photograph of John Marin by Alfred Stieglitz

In Paris, his social circle included Lowenfels, photographer Berenice Abbott, publisher Jane Heap, composer George Anthiel, sculptor Thelma Wood, painter André Favory, writer Norman Douglas, writer and editor George Davis, composer and writer Max Ewing, and writer Michael Fraenkel.

Upon his return to New York in 1929, Margules attended an exhibition of John Marin's paintings.

While at the exhibition, he "launched into an eloquent explanation of Marin to two nearby women", and was overheard by an impressed Alfred Stieglitz. The photographer and art promoter invited Margules to dine with his wife, the artist Georgia O'Keeffe, and his assistant, painter Emil Zoler. Stieglitz thereafter became a friend and mentor to Margules, becoming for him "what Socrates was to his friends."

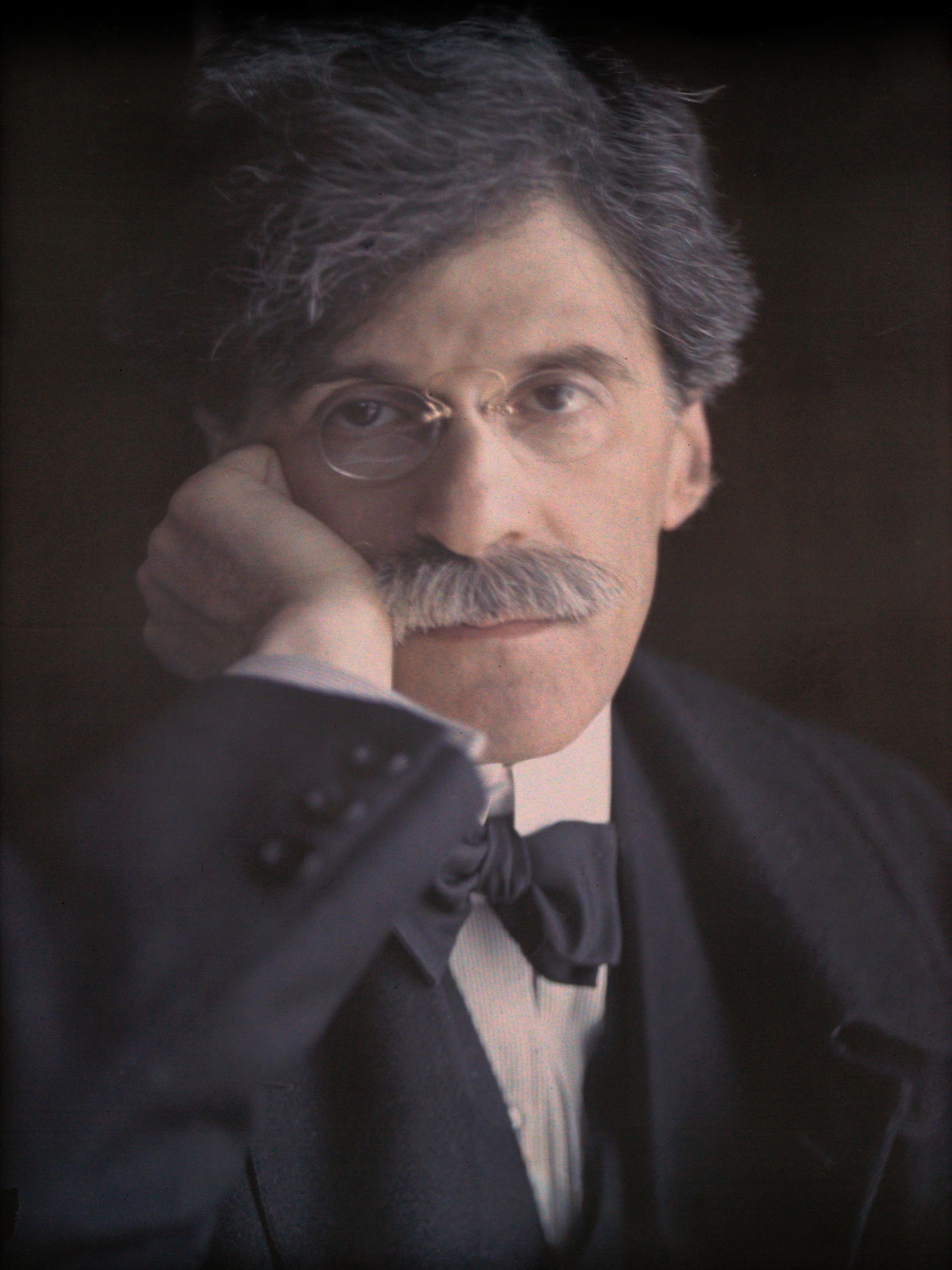
Alfred Stieglitz

Stieglitz introduced Margules to John Marin, who quickly became the most important painterly influence upon Margules. Elaine de Kooning later noted that Margules was "[i]ndebted to Marin and through Marin to Cézanne for his initial conceptual approach - for his constructions of scenes with no negative elements, for skies that loom with the impact of mountains." Margules himself said that Marin was his "father and ... academy." The admiration was by no means unreciprocated: Marin said that Margules was "an art lover with abounding faith and sincerity, with much intelligence and quick seeing." Stieglitz also introduced Margules to many other artistic and intellectual figures in New York.

With the encouragement of Alfred Stieglitz, Margules in 1936 opened a two-room gallery at 43 West 8th Street called "Another Place." Over the following two years there were fourteen solo exhibitions by Margules and others, and the gallery was well-respected by the press. It was in this gallery that the painter James Lechay, Myron's brother, exhibited his first painting.

In 1936, Margules first saw recognition by major art museums when both the Museum of Modern Art and the Museum of Fine Arts, Boston purchased his works.

In 1942, Margules gave up working as a police reporter, and apparently dedicated himself thereafter solely to an artistic vocation.

== "The Baron of Greenwich Village" ==
Margules made his mark not only as an artist, but also as an outsized personality known throughout Greenwich Village and beyond.

To local residents, Margules was known as the "Baron", after Baron Maurice de Hirsch, a prominent German Jewish philanthropist. Margules was easily recognizable by the beret he routinely wore over his long hair. Writer Charles Norman said that he "dressed with a flair for sloppiness."

He was said to "know everybody" in Greenwich Village, to the extent that when the novelist and poet Maxwell Bodenheim was murdered, Margules was the first one the police sought to identify the body. Margules' letters show him interacting with art world figures such as Sacha Kolin, John Marin and Alfred Stieglitz, as well as with prominent figures outside the art world such as polymath Buckminster Fuller and writer Henry Miller.

Most of his friends and acquaintances found Margules a generous and voluble man, given to broadly emotionally expressive gestures and acts of kindness and loyalty. In 1929, he exhibited an example of this loyalty and fellow-feeling when he appeared in court to fight what the wrongful commitment of his friend, writer and sculptor Alfred Dreyfuss, who appeared to have been a victim of an illicit attempt to block an inheritance.

The Greenwich Village chronicler Charles Norman described the bone-crushing hugs that Margules would routinely bestow on his friends and acquaintances, and speaks of the "persuasive theatricality" that Margules seemed to have inherited from his actor parents. Norman also wrote about Margules' routine acts of kindness, taking in homeless artists, constantly feeding his friends and providing the salvatory loan where needed. Norman also notes that Margules was blessed with a loud and good voice, and was apt to sing an operatic air without provocation.

The writer and television personality Alexander King said

I think the outstanding characteristics of my friend's personality are affirmation, emphasis, and overemphasis. He chooses to express himself predominantly in superlatives and the gestures which accompany his utterances are sometimes dangerous to life and limb. Of the bystanders, I mean.

King also spoke with affectionate amusement about Margules' pride in his cooking, speaking of how "if he should ever invite you to dinner, he may serve you a hamburger with onions, in his kitchen-living room, with such an air of gastronomic protocol, such mysterious hints and ogling innuendoes, as if César Ritz and Brillat-Savarin had sneaked out, only a moment before, with his secret recipe in their pockets."

Comic book writer Alvin Schwartz imagined Margules at the Sixth Avenue Cafeteria in a debate with Clark Kent about whether Superman had the ability to stop Hitler.

Margules' entrenchment in the Greenwich Village milieu can be seen in a photograph from Fred McDarrah's "Beat Generation Album" of a January 13, 1961 writers' and poets' meeting to discuss "The Funeral of the Beat Generation", in Robert Cordier's railroad flat at 85 Christopher Street. Among the people in the same photograph are Shel Silverstein, Lester Blackiston, James Baldwin, Norman Mailer, beat poet Howard Hart, and Ted Joans. Incidentally, Hart mentioned Margules in his poem "Thelonious Monk," referring to the "thin wood rocking chair De Hirsch Margules's weight / Had busted Bless him now and forever."

More photos of Margules can be seen on the Smithsonian's "Archives of American Art" website, which has three photos which capture Margules' innate theatricality. One of them shows Margules (wearing his customary beret) jumping with childlike glee in a New York City Park, surrounded by a flurry of pigeons. Another shows Margules in his studio, brush in hand, posing in front of one of his paintings. A third. also taken in a New York City park, shows Margules in a display of mock-pomp, his hand inside his shirt a la Napoleon Bonaparte.

== Death ==
Among the three articles The New York Times dedicated to Margules' death was a mournful paean to lost Greenwich Village life written by Bernard Weinraub: "The Baron was De Hirsh Margules, painter, poet and newspaper reporter. He was remembered yesterday, on his burial, with the same gusto that marked his life in the Village."

Maurice, the self-styled "Prince of Bohemia" of Greenwich Village, remarked that

Once there were so many genuine Bohemians in the Village. But now, so few oldtimers are left. Jake Spencer and Earl Kirkham and Harrison Doud are gone--all gone. And now the Baron.

Artist Leslie Jencel was quoted as saying

I'm wearing my black leather cape today because De Hirsh would have wanted me to. He had such a sense of drama, of color. He had such a spirit of youth and creativity-a rare and wise and unusual man.

Another artist, Aristodimos Kaldis, said

He was one of the last of the true Villagers. We used to go to the old Waldorf Cafeteria on Sixth Avenue and debate esthetics-whether Rembrandt was the master of light, or El Greco or Tintoretto. We used to debate all night. Now of course, those days are gone.

Margules' sister, actress Annette Margules, remembered him as

charitable and generous to all who needed help. He took care of people, he even fed people. Why, last night, people came up to me and said, 'How am I going to eat now that De Hirsh is gone?

The supposedly penniless Margules left an estate of more than $100,000, the amount and circumstances of which were enough to merit a New York Times article and a mention by nationally syndicated celebrity columnist Leonard Lyons, who remarked

the big shock to Greenwich Village's Bohemian colony last week was in learning that the Bohemian painter, de Hirsch Margolis [sic], left a huge estate. He was a stock market wizard.

(This is a conclusion that has been disputed with by Charles Norman, who stated that collector Harrison D. Horblit purchased all remaining Margules paintings "in order to swell the estate.")

Among the forty-five people sharing in his estate were "beneficiaries living in such diverse areas as Greenwich Village, Paris, Niagara Falls, Oyster Bay, and the Lower East Side of Manhattan."

== Exhibitions and critical reception ==
Year	Exhibition	Notes
1922	Little Review Gallery group show.	
c. 1922–1927	Exhibitions at Romany Marie's gallery.	
1927	"Twenty Paintings, Experiments in Plastic Form", solo show at the Paris home of Walter Lowenfels.	
1932	Group show at the Jumble Shop.	The New York Times critic Edward Allen Jewell said "De Hirsh Margule's two 'Waterbury Bridges' are imaginative and delicate... related to the slightly precious water-color tradition of Demuth or a Rosella Hartman".
1936	Solo show of watercolors at Margules' gallery, Another Place.	
1937	Museum of Modern Art group show of new acquisitions.	Includes the work of Miró, Arp, Mondrian, Giacometti, and Magritte. Margules' piece at the show was the watercolor "Portuguese Dock, Glouchester.
1938	Group retrospective including Margules of work from 1937–1938 at the Artists Gallery.	
1938	Group Exhibition, Albright Gallery, Buffalo, New York.	
1938	Museum of Modern Art group show.	Show features artists such as Arshile Gorky, Georgia O'Keeffe, John Marin, Man Ray. Edward Hopper, George Grosz and Lyonel Feininger. Margules' painting "Present and Past, Gloucester", was included in this exhibition.
1938	Paris Exhibition, Galerie nationale du Jeu de Paume	
1939	Solo watercolor show at the A.C.A. gallery.	Show which was highly praised by The New York Times critic Howard Devree (see introductory section).
1939	"Fifty Dollar Show", sponsored by the American Artists' Congress at the A.C.A. gallery.	Artists other than Margules include Philip Evergood and Stuart Davis.
1939	Group show at the Artists Gallery.	This show included work from Kandinsky, Klee, Dalí, Milton Avery, Philip Evergood, James Lechay, and Stuart Davis.
1939	1939 New York World's Fair Exhibition of Contemporary Artists.	
1939	Brooklyn Museum of Art International Watercolor Exhibition, 10th Biennial	
1940	Group show at the Artists Gallery.	
1940	Solo show of paintings at the Cape Hatteras region at the Ferargil Gallery in 1940.	New York Times critic Howard Devree commented that: Margules, who is already represented in the permanent collections of the Boston and Brooklyn Museums and the Museum of Modern Art, has grown steadily with every show. Beginning with a strong admiration for Marin, he has worked through a period of abstraction and learned to apply abstraction intelligently in his finished work instead of leaving it raw abstraction.
1941	Group show at the Milch Gallery,	Modernist works by Margules and others were shown along with earlier American painters such as Winslow Homer, Thomas Eakins, John Singer Sargent, and Childe Hassam.
1941	Solo show at the Ferargil Gallery.	The New York Times critic Howard Devree commented that this show was one of the "outstanding exhibitions of the early season."
1941	Group watercolor show at the Ferargil Gallery.	
1941	Solo show sponsored by the Artists Gallery at the Lincoln School of Teachers College.	
1941	Group show at the Metropolitan Museum of Art entitled "Special Exhibition of Contemporary Painting in the United States."	Show includes Margules watercolors "Present and Past, Gloucester", "Crow Village", and "Blue Boats." Some of the other artists in show were John Marin, Reginald Marsh, Edward Hopper, George Grosz, Ben Shahn, Thomas Hart Benton, and Andrew Wyeth.
1941	Whitney Museum Annual.	
1942	Seasonal retrospective at the Artists Gallery which included Margules watercolors.	
1942	Art Institute of Chicago, Twenty-first International Exhibition of Water Colors.	Margules' piece in the exhibition is entitled "Decoys, Traps and Houses, Isle au Haut." Other artists at exhibition include Rufino Tamayo, Paul Cadmus, Stuart Davis, Ludwig Bemelmans, Max Weber, and Andrew Wyeth.
1942	Metropolitan Museum of Art group show. "On the Bright Side: A Loan Exhibition of Contemporary Painting & Sculpture."	Margules is represented in the exhibition by the watercolor "Squall at Stonington." Other artists shown include Frederick Haucke, Paul Cadmus, Stuart Davis, and Joseph DeMartini.
1943	Art Institute of Chicago, Twenty-second International Exhibition of Water Colors.	Margules' piece in the exhibition is entitled "Bleecker Street." Other artists at exhibition include Jacob Lawrence, Lyonel Feininger, Marc Chagall, Stuart Davis, George Grosz, Reginald Marsh. John Marin, Andrew Wyeth, and Morris Kantor.
1943	Brooklyn Museum of Art International Watercolor Exhibition, 12th Biennial.	Museum announces purchase of Margules work "Dim-out." Connected with this, apparently, Margules receives the Brooklyn Museum Purchase Prize.
1944	Group show at the Marquié Gallery with James Lechay and Ladislas Segy.	Howard Devree gave high praise to the Margules work displayed at this show: Margules is one of our most vigorous and original water-colorists, with a penchant for strong color and thrusting design. He has learned much from abstraction and exploits it in his staccato impressions of the Gloucester waterfront. His work here has as much vitality, and impact, as any painter needs, and he is a born experimentalist.
1944	Brooklyn Museum of Art exhibit "One Hundred Artists and Walkowitz"	As the title of the exhibit suggests, 100 different artists, including Joseph Stella, Milton Avery, William Groper, and Max Weber presented portraits of the artist Abraham Walkowitz.
1945	Solo show at the Feigl gallery.	The New York Times critic Howard Devree calls this exhibition one of the "outstanding shows ...of the season.
1946	Group show at the Feigl gallery.	The New York Times critic Howard Devree finds Margules working in oil, presenting his "space-and-color experiments, dashingly brought off", and "surpris[ing] his admirers with a very strikingly abstractly designed canvas of ship models and tables."
1946	Solo show at the Feigl gallery.	The New York Times critic Howard Devree states that: De Hirsh Margules grows with every show and his current harvest at the Feigl Gallery is his very best by far. In 'Squall,' the centripetally designed 'Lighthouse,' the 'Three Gulls,' with its extraordinary use of deep space, and 'Gloucester Harbor,' Margules has outdone himself and there is no let-down in the level of the show. Despite these explosive, space-filling compositions and free use of color, the close integration of the work is marked by new control and maturity.
1946	Butler Institute of American Art, Youngstown, Ohio. One-person show.	
1946	University of Michigan Museum of Art. "Water Colors by Dong Kingman & DeHirsh Margules,"	
1948	Group show at the Whitney Museum.	Other artists shown include Lyonel Feininger. Jacob Lawrence, and John Marin.
1948	Group show of one hundred artists at the Jewish Museum.	After exhibition all paintings were donated to the new nation of Israel. Among other artists are George Biddle, Joseph Margulies and Morris Kantor.
1950	Whitney Museum Annual.	
1954	Solo show at Gallery 75.	The New York Times stated, in a generally favorable review that: Provincetown is the subject of De Hirsh Margules' buoyant and brilliant water-colors at Gallery 75. The artist spares no pains to embellish seaside and cloudscape in a fantastic manner. They are entirely visual in their appeal, but there is something so exuberant in the artist's approach that the subject might have been seen by him in a happy trance. However, subtlety is one quality that is markedly absent here.
1954	Group show recognizing tercentenerary of Jewish settlement in America held at the Riverside Museum.	
1961	Solo show at the Artists Gallery of "Time Paintings."	New York Times Critic Brian Doherty was not an unalloyed fan of "Time Painting", and seemed to be unaware that Margules had been using this method since the 1920s, saying that: Although Mr. Margules' figures still walk up and down colorful New York Streets with endearing abandon. I regret to say that the discipline of this new concept seems to be foreign to Mr.Margules' temperament.
2012	Group show at the Hecksher Museum of Art, Huntington, New York entitled "Absorbed by Color".	Margules' "Approach to Provincetown^" (1948), shown along with paintings by Josef Albers, George Biddle and others.

== Museum holdings ==
Museum	Item	Link to image
Brooklyn Museum of Art	1962 Margules monotype entitled "The Time Lady Cometh, I."	Not viewable online.
Brooklyn Museum of Art	Watercolor of a nighttime city scene entitled "Dim-out."	Dim-out (Image is small and monochrome)
Butler Institute of American Art, Youngstown Ohio	A striking and refreshing watercolor exhibiting Margules' signature bulging perspective, entitled "Basin for Little Boats, another water scene, entitled "Sailboats," a well-composed boat scene with a flat perspective owing something to Ancient Egypt, named "Sailboats, Sun and Moon," and a Calderesque (or perhaps Matisse-like)gouache called "Dancer.	Butler Margules Holdings
David Owsley Museum of Art Ball State University, Muncie, Indiana	Collaboration with Arshile Gorky in an abstract piece in crayon and graphite called "The Outbreak of War in Europe."	The Outbreak of War in Europe
Farnsworth Art Museum, Rockland, Maine	This museum owns three Margules pieces, a 1925 untitled oil on canvas, an untitled gouache on paper from the 1930s, an untitled view of Monhegan Harbor and Manana Island.	Not viewable online.
Heckscher Museum of Art, Huntington, New York	A lively, almost Kandinskyesque view of the waterfront entitled "The Harbor, New York.	The Harbor, NY
Heckscher Museum of Art, Huntington, New York	An intense color-saturated landscape from 1948 entitled "Approach to Provincetown."	Approach to Provincetown
Hirshhorn Museum and Sculpture Garden, Smithsonian Institution	1941 Margules watercolor entitled "Broome St. Tabernacle," and 1941 watercolor entitled "Waverly, Gay and Christopher Street," both of which were part of a large group of paintings willed to the Smithsonian by Joseph Hirshhorn in 1981.	Hirshorn Margules Holdings
Museum of Fine Arts, Boston	Margules watercolor named "Waterbury Bridge"	Not available online.
Museum of Modern Art	The Museum of Modern Art owns (or owned) a watercolor entitled "Portuguese Dock, Glouchester." MOMA officially announced the addition of "Portuguese Dock, Glouchester", to its collection in 1937 This piece may have been deaccessioned, since it appears in records from the Richard York Gallery from the late 80s and early 90s.	Not viewable online.
New York Public Library, Miriam and Ira D. Wallach Division of Art, Prints and Photographs	The NYPL has a gelatin silver print photograph of Berenice Abbott taken by Margules some time in the 1930s, and a gelatin silver print photograph of someone named Julie Oppenheim Delton taken by Margules some time in the 1920s.	Not viewable online.
Provincetown Art Association and Museum	Watercolor called "Sunspots and Seascapes."	Not viewable online.
University of Arizona Museum of Art	A twilight view from 1938 of NYC's Fifth Avenue just north of the Washington Square Arch, entitled "Lower Fifth Avenue"	Lower Fifth Avenue
University of Iowa Museum of Art	An affecting watercolor portrait of his friend, painter James Lechay, the brother of Myron.	Portrait of James Lechay
Whitney Museum	The Whitney Museum acknowledges owning one Margules work, but does identify what it is. However, it appears from Smithsonian records that it may be a 1943 "informal portrait" of the artist Joseph Stella. which has been described by artist and Brooklyn Daily Eagle critic Alexander Zerdini Kruse as "a striking piece of water-color characterization."	Not viewable online.
Walker Art Center, Minneapolis, Minnesota	A 1938 gouache/watercolor entitled "Gloucester Street Scene."	Gloucester Street Scene

== Other links to artwork ==
Other examples of Margules' work can be found elsewhere online. Since some of these links are from galleries, these may become unusable after the items are sold.

The site americanjewishart.com displays an undated watercolor entitled "East Gloucester"

Artdaily.org shows a 1939 collaboration among Arshile Gorky, Margules and Isamu Noguchi entitled "Hitler invades Poland" According to Noguchi, the trio "made several paintings together at that time."

A large cache of Margules works was sold in 2007 by CRN Auctions. Thumbnails of these works can be seen ib crnauctions.com Characterful portraits of the artists Milton Avery and Abraham Walkowitz and a self-portrait of Margules (which was not for sale) are visible here. Various "Time Paintings" are also on display, but many of these and other complicated works are hard to appreciate fully due to the low resolution and small image size. (There is a link to enlarge the images, but it does not work.) Of additional interest here is a portrait by James Lechay of Margules.

The gallery Levis Fine Art has an online collection of intensely colored Margules paintings made up of the 1938 mixed media painting "The Boatyard", a 1939 gouache of a waterfront scene entitled "Diagonals in Purple and Red", a 1939 waterfront and airfield scene called "Diagonals with Airforms and Hedges", and a couple of 1943 paintings of airplanes in flight, one untitled and the other one named "Convergence."

The Birnham Wood Gallery also has quite a few Margules works on display. Among the best here are a watercolor from 1941, entitled "Figures and Flowers at Rest", a 1951 watercolor and gouache of a ship battling a stormy sea called "The Flying Dutchman", a serene watercolor view of the High Bridge over New York City's Harlem river named "High Bridge on the Hudson", an angular and deeply colored 1937 piece called "Red Spector among the Sail Lofts", and a jaunty undated waterfront view entitled "Safe Harbor."
