= Costești (disambiguation) =

Costești is a town in Argeș County, Romania.

Costești may also refer to the following places:

== Romania ==
- Costești, Buzău, a commune in Buzău County
- Costești, Iași, a commune in Iași County
- Costești, Vâlcea, a commune in Vâlcea County
- Costești, Vaslui, a commune in Vaslui County
- Costești, a village in the commune Albac, Alba County
- Costești, a village in the commune Poiana Vadului, Alba County
- Costești, a village in the commune Cotmeana, Argeș County
- Costești, a village in the commune Răchiți, Botoșani County
- Costești, a village in the commune Fieni, Dâmbovița County
- Costești, a village in the commune Aninoasa, Gorj
- Costești, a village in the commune Orăștioara de Sus, Hunedoara County
- Costești, a village in the commune Balta, Mehedinți County
- Costeștii din Vale, a commune in Dâmbovița County
- Costești-Vâlsan, a village in the commune Mușătești, Argeș County
- Costești (river), a tributary of the Bistrița in Vâlcea County

== Moldova ==
- Costești, Rîșcani, a city in Rîșcani district
- Costești, Ialoveni
- Costești, Ivanovca, Hîncești

== Ukraine ==
- Costești, the Romanian name for Kostyntsi

== See also ==
- Coasta (disambiguation)
