= Nucu River =

Nucu River may refer to:

- Nucu River (Bălăneasa)
- Nucu River (Slănic)

== See also ==
- Nucu
- Nucet River (disambiguation)
