= Tomșani, Vâlcea =

Tomșani
- Commune
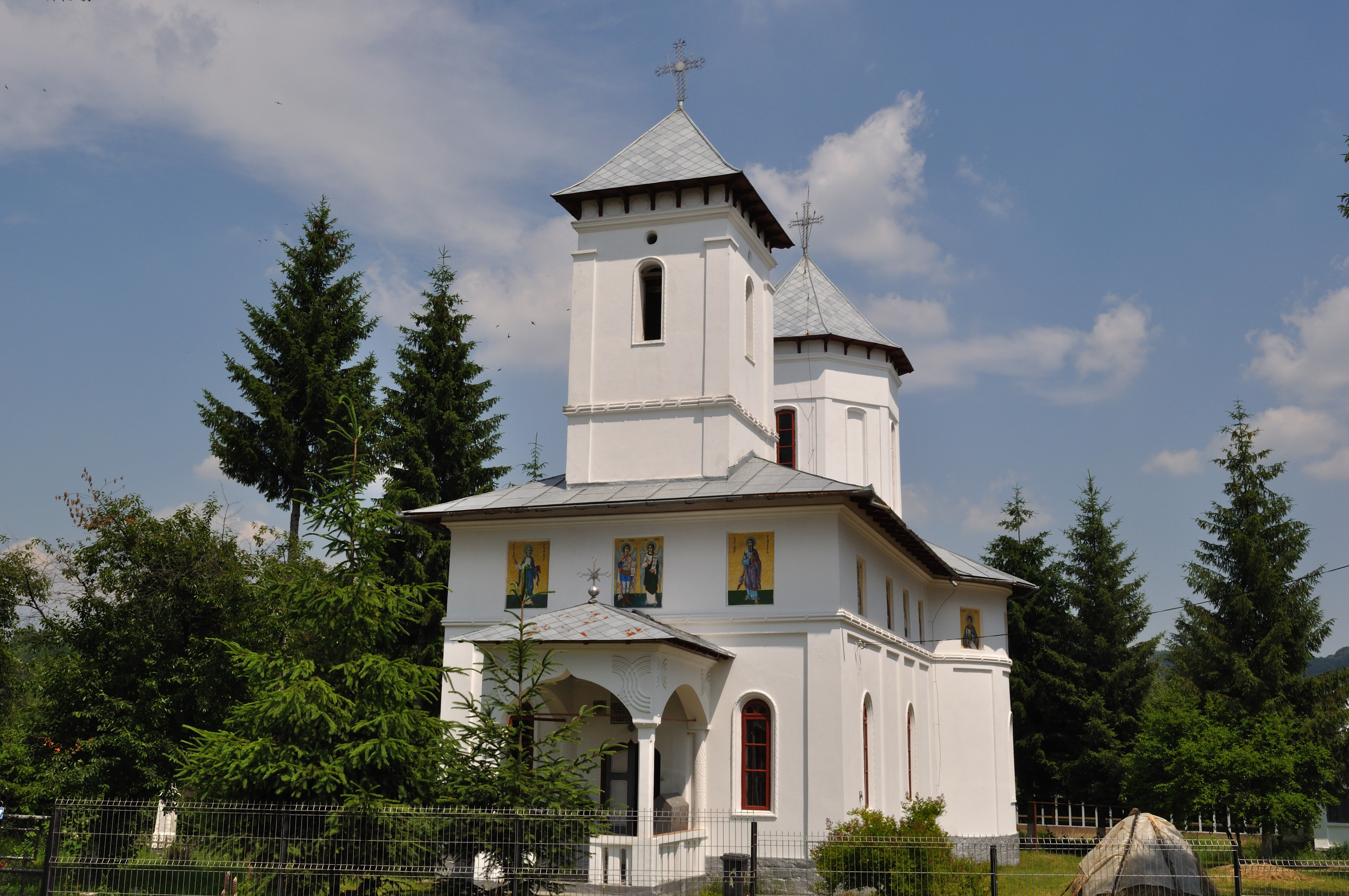
- Church in Tomșani

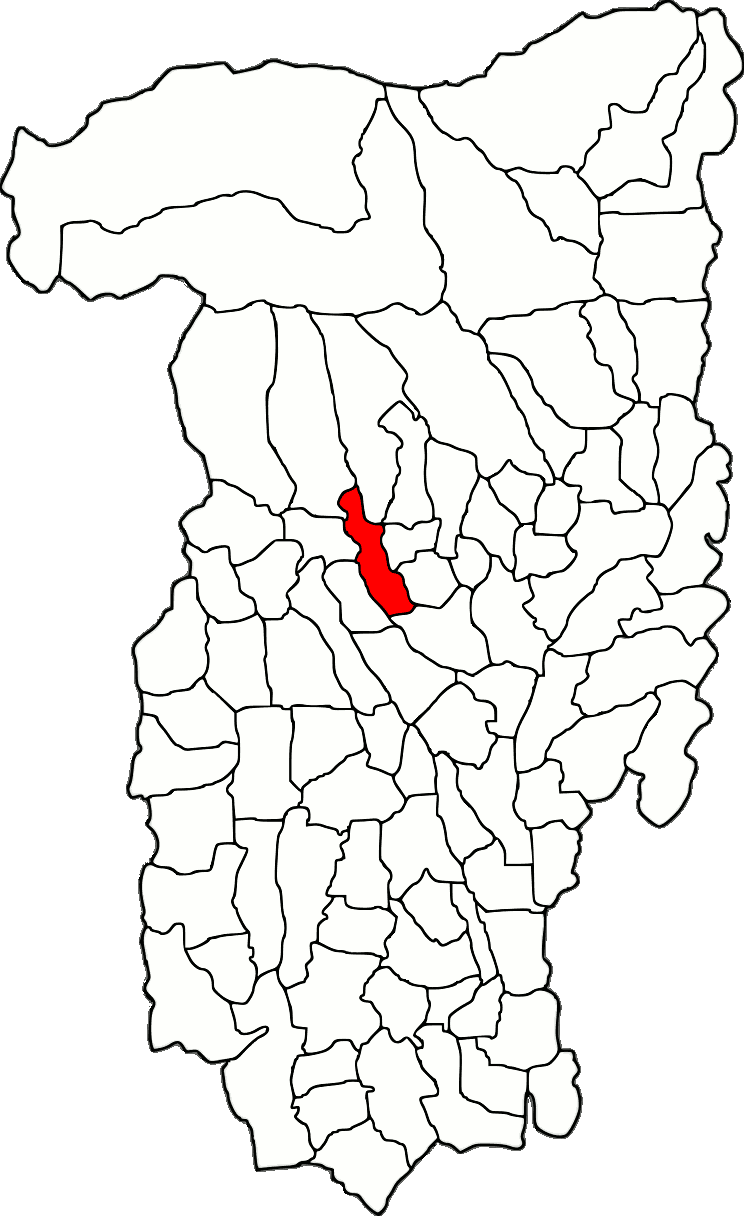
- Location in Vâlcea County

- Location in Romania
- Coordinates: 45°05′N 24°04′E
- Country: Romania
- County: Vâlcea
- Established: 1453 (first attested)
- Subdivisions: Bălțățeni, Bogdănești, Chiceni, Dumbrăvești, Foleștii de Jos, Foleștii de Sus, Mirești, Tomșani

Government
  - Mayor (2020–2024): Nicolae Andrei (PNL)
- Area: 43.37 km^{2} (16.75 sq mi)
- Elevation: 413 m (1,355 ft)
- Population (2021-12-01): 3,321
  - Density: 76.57/km^{2} (198.3/sq mi)
- Time zone: UTC+02:00 (EET)
  - Summer (DST): UTC+03:00 (EEST)
- Postal code: 247705
- Area code: +(40) 250
- Vehicle reg.: VL
- Website: comuna-tomsani.ro

Tomșani is a commune located in Vâlcea County, Oltenia, Romania, about 43 km from Râmnicu Vâlcea and 5 km from Horezu. It is composed of eight villages: Bălțățeni, Bogdănești, Chiceni, Dumbrăvești, Foleștii de Jos, Foleștii de Sus, Mirești, and Tomșani.

Agriculture is the main source of income. There are special traditions which have been well preserved.

== Neighbours ==
- Costești and Horezu to the north.
- Pietrari and Păușești to the east.
- Măldărești and Oteșani to the west.
- Frâncești to the south.

== History ==
A 1453 document attests the existence of the village of Foleștii de Sus, while a 1536 one mentions the villages of Tomșani and Bogdănești.

Historical monuments

- "Three Holy Hierarchs" Church in Foleștii de Jos, built in 1767
- "Blessed Paraskevi" Church in Foleștii de Sus, built in 1757
- "Holy Archangels Michael and Gabriel" Church in Baltățeni, built in 1773–1774

== Geography ==
The river Bistrița, a tributary of the Olt, passes through the commune from north to south. The topography of the area is made of the sub-Carpathian hills; the commune is at an altitude of about 650 m (2,130 ft).

== Economy ==
Unlike the majority of the Romanian countryside, collectivisation under Communism did not seriously affect Tomșani, with most farmers retaining their land. Most residents work in agriculture, particularly hay, fruit and apiculture.

Tomșani has easy access by road to the national and European system from the

- European route E81 (Bucharest–Râmnicu Vâlcea–Sibiu)
- DN 67 (Râmnicu Vâlcea–Costești–Horezu)
- DJ 646 (DN 64: Băbeni–Frâncești–Foleștii de Jos–Foleștii de Sus–Tomșani)

Historical population
Year	Pop.	±%
2002	4,194	—
2011	3,729	−11.1%
2021	3,321	−10.9%
Source: Census data

== Natives ==
- Mihaela Armășescu (born 1963), rower
