= Râmești =

Râmești may refer to several places in Romania:

- Râmești, a village in the town of Horezu, Vâlcea County
- Râmești, a village in Șușani Commune, Vâlcea County
- Râmești (river), a tributary of the Pârâul Urșanilor in Vâlcea County
