= Măcriș River =

Măcriș River may refer to:

- Măcriș, a tributary of the Pârâul Urșanilor in Vâlcea County
- Măcriș River (Șușița)

== See also ==
- Măcrișu River (disambiguation)
- Macris
