= Horezu (Bistricioara) =

Romanian river

- Location within Romania

Location
- Country: Romania
- Counties: Vâlcea County

Physical characteristics
- Mouth: Bistricioara
  - coordinates: 45.2090°N 23.9976°E
- Length: 13 km (8.1 mi)
- Basin size: 34 km^{2} (13 sq mi)

Basin features
- Progression: Bistricioara→ Bistrița→ Olt→ Danube→ Black Sea
- Tributaries
  - left: Cernele
  - right: Ponoru, Ludeasa, Pleșa

The Horezu is a right tributary of the river Bistricioara in Romania. It flows into the Bistricioara near Romanii de Sus. Its length is 13 km (8.1 mi) and its basin size is 34 km^{2} (13 sq mi).
