= Coasta River =

Coasta River may refer to the following rivers in Romania:

- Coasta, a tributary of the Lotru in Vâlcea County
- Coasta, a tributary of the Valea Caselor in Sibiu County
- Coasta Benghii River
- Coasta lui Rus, a tributary of the Jieț

== See also ==
- Coasta (disambiguation)
- Costești River
