= Buzdugan =

Buzdugan ("mace") may refer to several entities in Romania:

- Buzdugan, a village in Păușești Commune, Vâlcea County
- Gheorghe Buzdugan (1867–1929), jurist and politician
- Ion Buzdugan (1887–1967), politician
