= Bistricioara (Vâlcea) =

- Location within Romania

Location
- Country: Romania
- Counties: Vâlcea County
- Villages: Romanii de Sus, Romanii de Jos, Bogdănești

Physical characteristics
- Mouth: Bistrița
  - coordinates: 45.1272°N 24.0478°E
- Length: 22 km (14 mi)
- Basin size: 72 km^{2} (28 sq mi)

Basin features
- Progression: Bistrița→ Olt→ Danube→ Black Sea
- Tributaries
  - right: Horezu, Lunga

The Bistricioara is a right tributary of the river Bistrița in Romania. It flows into the Bistrița in Tomșani. Its length is 22 km (14 mi) and its basin size is 72 km^{2} (28 sq mi).
