= Folești mine =

Salt mine in Vâlcea County, Romania

Foleşti mine
- Location: Tomșani, Vâlcea County, Romania
- Products: Sodium chloride
- Company: Salrom

The Foleşti mine is a large salt mine located in southern Romania in Vâlcea County, close to Tomșani. Foleşti represents one of the largest salt reserves in Romania having estimated reserves of 22 billion tonnes of NaCl.
