= Gurgui =

- Location within Romania

Location
- Country: Romania
- Counties: Vâlcea County

Physical characteristics
- Source: Căpățânii Mountains
- Mouth: Bistrița
  - coordinates: 45.2134°N 24.0289°E
- Length: 12 km (7.5 mi)
- Basin size: 20 km^{2} (7.7 sq mi)

Basin features
- Progression: Bistrița→ Olt→ Danube→ Black Sea

The Gurgui is a right tributary of the river Bistrița in Romania. It flows into the Bistrița north of the village Bistrița. Its length is 12 km (7.5 mi) and its basin size is 20 km^{2} (7.7 sq mi).
