= Păușești =

- Commune
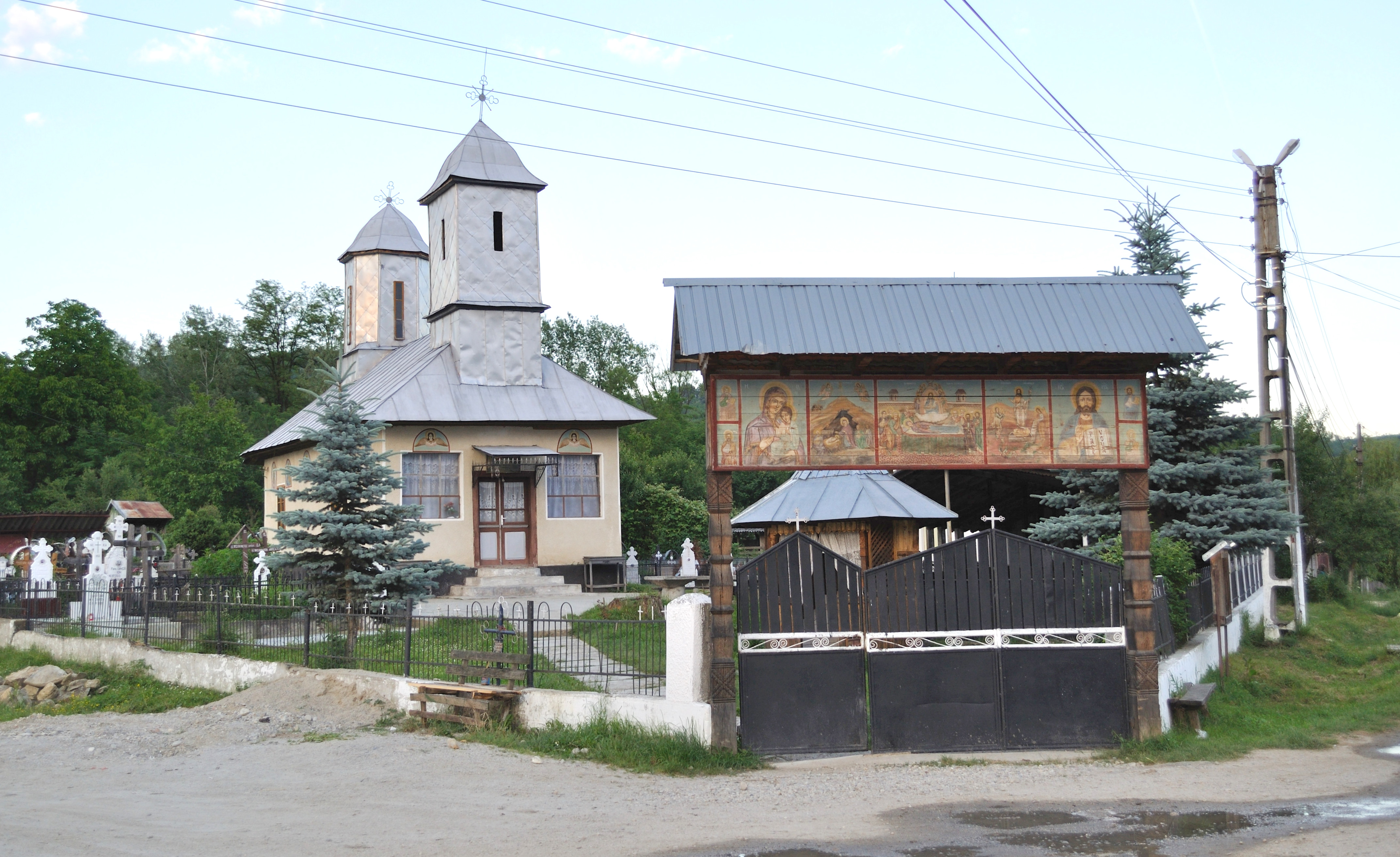
- Wooden church in Cernelele

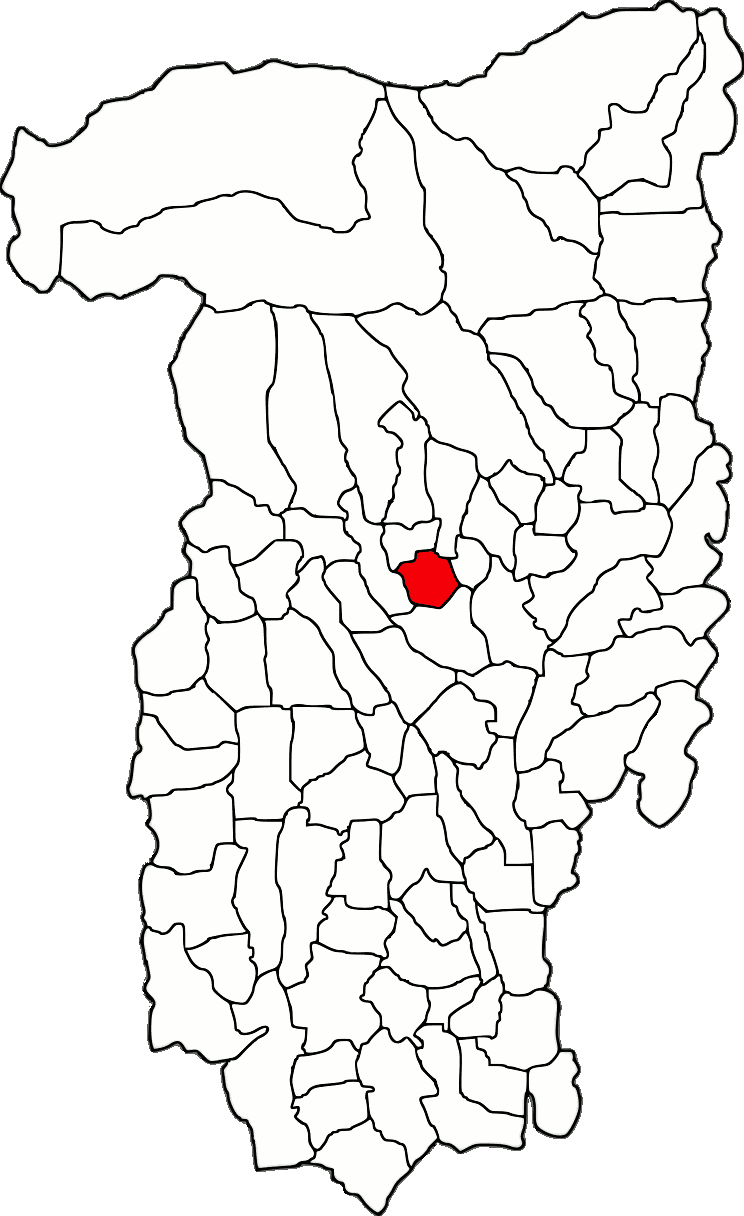
- Location in Vâlcea County

- Location in Romania
- Coordinates: 45.079°N 24.138°E
- Country: Romania
- County: Vâlcea

Government
  - Mayor (2020–2024): Cătălin Avan (PER)
- Area: 21.75 km^{2} (8.40 sq mi)
- Elevation: 306 m (1,004 ft)
- Population (2021-12-01): 2,349
  - Density: 108.0/km^{2} (279.7/sq mi)
- Time zone: UTC+02:00 (EET)
  - Summer (DST): UTC+03:00 (EEST)
- Postal code: 247460
- Vehicle reg.: VL
- Website: www.comunapausesti-otasau.ro

Păușești is a commune located in Vâlcea County, Oltenia, Romania. It is composed of three villages: Buzdugan, Păușești, and Păușești-Otăsău.

The commune is located in the center of the county, 4 km (2.5 mi) away from the spa town of Băile Govora, 20 km (12 mi) from the town of Horezu, and 30 km (19 mi) away from the county capital, Râmnicu Vâlcea. It is traversed north to south by the river Otăsău. Păușești borders Pietrari and Stoenești communes to the north, Frâncești commune to the south, Băile Govora to the east, and Tomșani commune to the west.

The Brădești and Văleni oil fields are located on the territory of the commune.

== Natives ==
- Daniel Chițoiu (born 1967), economist who served as Finance Minister in 2012–2014.
