= Luncavăț =

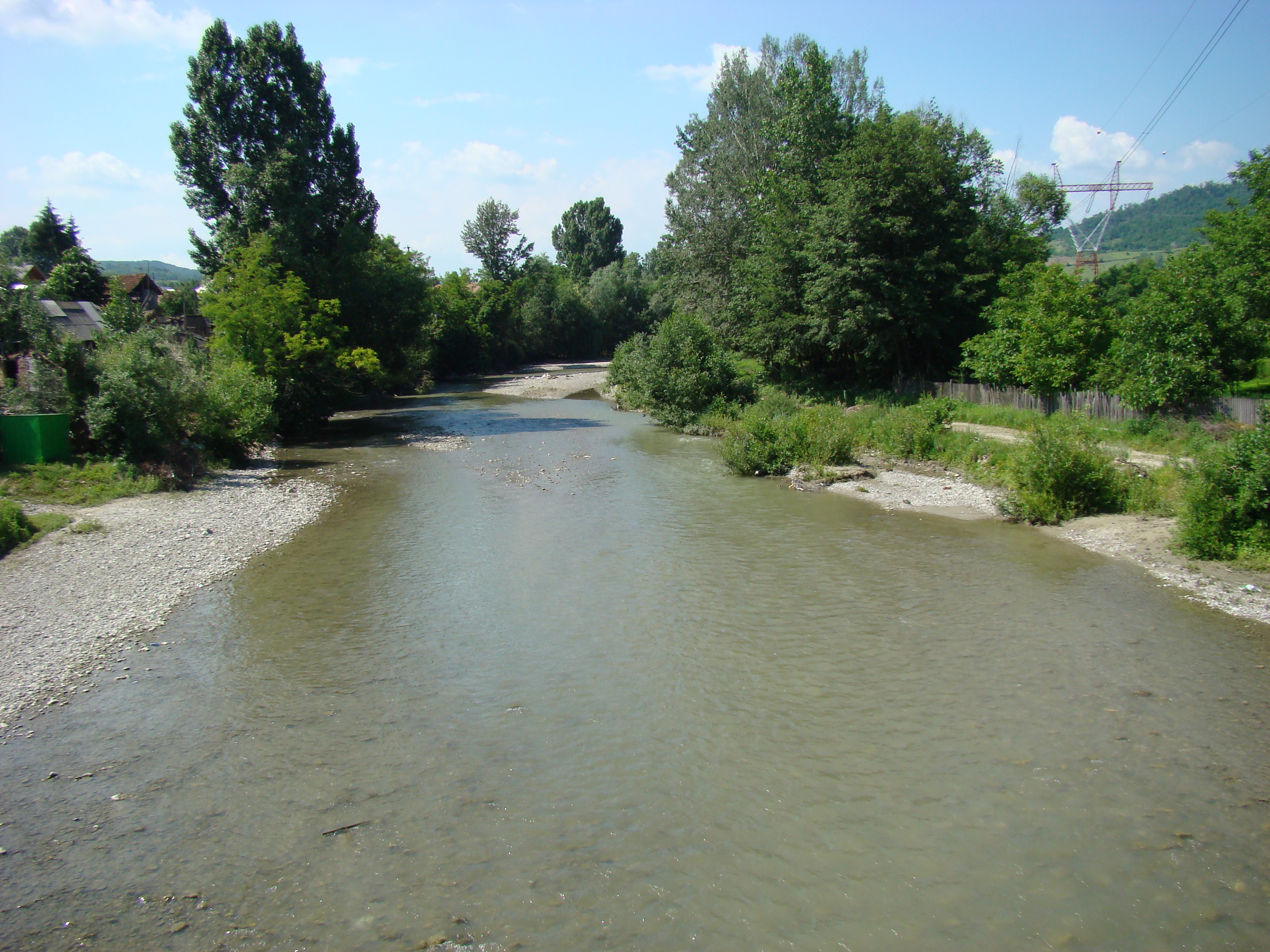

- Location within Romania

Location
- Country: Romania
- Counties: Vâlcea County
- Villages: Vaideeni, Horezu, Oteșani, Popești, Șirineasa

Physical characteristics
- Source: Căpățânii Mountains
- Mouth: Olt
  - coordinates: 44.9149°N 24.2457°E
- Length: 60 km (37 mi)
- Basin size: 274 km^{2} (106 sq mi)

Basin features
- Progression: Olt→ Danube→ Black Sea
- Tributaries
  - left: Balota, Pârâul Blajului, Mercurea, Pârâul Urșanilor
  - right: Mânăstirea

The Luncavăț (in its upper course also: Curpeni) is a right tributary of the river Olt in Romania. It discharges into the Olt near Marcea. The Luncavăț originates in the Căpățânii Mountains. Its length is 60 km (37 mi) and its basin size is 274 km^{2} (106 sq mi).
