= Râmești (river) =

- Location within Romania

Location
- Country: Romania
- Counties: Vâlcea County
- Villages: Ifrimești, Râmești

Physical characteristics
- Mouth: Pârâul Urșanilor
  - coordinates: 45.1447°N 23.9958°E
- Length: 16 km (9.9 mi)
- Basin size: 21 km^{2} (8.1 sq mi)

Basin features
- Progression: Pârâul Urșanilor→ Luncavăț→ Olt→ Danube→ Black Sea

The Râmești is a left tributary of the Pârâul Urșanilor in Romania. It flows into the Pârâul Urșanilor in Horezu. Its length is 16 km (9.9 mi) and its basin size is 21 km^{2} (8.1 sq mi).
