= Nucet (disambiguation) =

Nucet may refer to several places in Romania:

- Nucet, a town in Bihor County
- Nucet, Dâmbovița, a commune in Dâmbovița County
- Nucet, a village in Chiojdeanca Commune, Prahova County
- Nucet, a village in Gornet Commune, Prahova County
- Nucet, a village in Roșia Commune, Sibiu County
- Nucet, a tributary of the Ialomița in Dâmbovița County
