= Măcrișu River =

Măcrișu River may refer to:

- Măcrișu, a tributary of the Pleșu in Gorj County
- Măcrișu, a tributary of the Zăbala in Vrancea County

== See also ==
- Măcriș River (disambiguation)
