= Brădești oil field =

Oil field in Romania

Brădești
- Country: Romania
- Region: Vâlcea County
- Offshore/onshore: onshore
- Operator: Petrom

Field history
- Discovery: 1970
- Start of development: 1970
- Start of production: 1971

Production
- Current production of oil: 3,500 barrels per day (~1.7×10^{5} t/a)
- Estimated oil in place: 14 million tonnes (~ 20×10^{6} m^{3} or 100 million bbl)

The Brădești oil field is an oil field located in Păușești, Vâlcea County. It was discovered in 1970 and developed by Petrom. It began production in 1971 and produces oil. The total proven reserves of the Brădești oil field are around 100 million barrels (14 million tonnes), and production is centered on 3,500 barrels per day (560 m^{3}/d).
