= Băbeni oil field =

Romanian oil field

Băbeni
- Country: Romania
- Region: Vâlcea County
- Offshore/onshore: onshore
- Operator: Petrom

Field history
- Discovery: 1974
- Start of production: 1975

Production
- Current production of oil: 2,000 barrels per day (~100,000 t/a)
- Estimated oil in place: 69.5 million tonnes (~ 82.2×10^{6} m^{3} or 517 million bbl)

The Băbeni oil field is an oil field located in Băbeni, Vâlcea County. It was discovered in 1974 and developed by Petrom. It began production in 1975 and produces oil and natural gas. The total proven reserves of the Băbeni oil field are around 517 million barrels (69.5 million tonnes), and production is centered on 2,000 barrels per day (320 m^{3}/d).
