= Coasta =

Coasta may refer to several villages in Romania:

- Coasta, a village in Șieu-Odorhei Commune, Bistrița-Năsăud County
- Coasta, a village in Bonțida Commune, Cluj County
- Coasta, a village in Golești, Vâlcea
- Coasta, a village in Păușești-Măglași Commune, Vâlcea County
- Coasta (band), an alternative rock band from Long Island, New York

== See also ==
- Coasta River (disambiguation)
- Costești (disambiguation)
- Costișa, name of several villages in Romania
- Costinești, name of two villages in Romania
