= Otăsău =

- Location within Romania

Location
- Country: Romania
- Counties: Vâlcea County
- Villages: Bărbătești, Pietrari, Păușești, Frâncești

Physical characteristics
- Source: Căpățânii Mountains
- Mouth: Bistrița
  - coordinates: 44.9988°N 24.2032°E
- Length: 30 km (19 mi)
- Basin size: 102 km^{2} (39 sq mi)

Basin features
- Progression: Bistrița→ Olt→ Danube→ Black Sea
- Tributaries
  - left: Tisa

The Otăsău is a left tributary of the river Bistrița in Romania. It discharges into the Bistrița in Frâncești. Its length is 30 km (19 mi) and its basin size is 102 km^{2} (39 sq mi).
