= Horezu ceramics =

Type of Romanian pottery

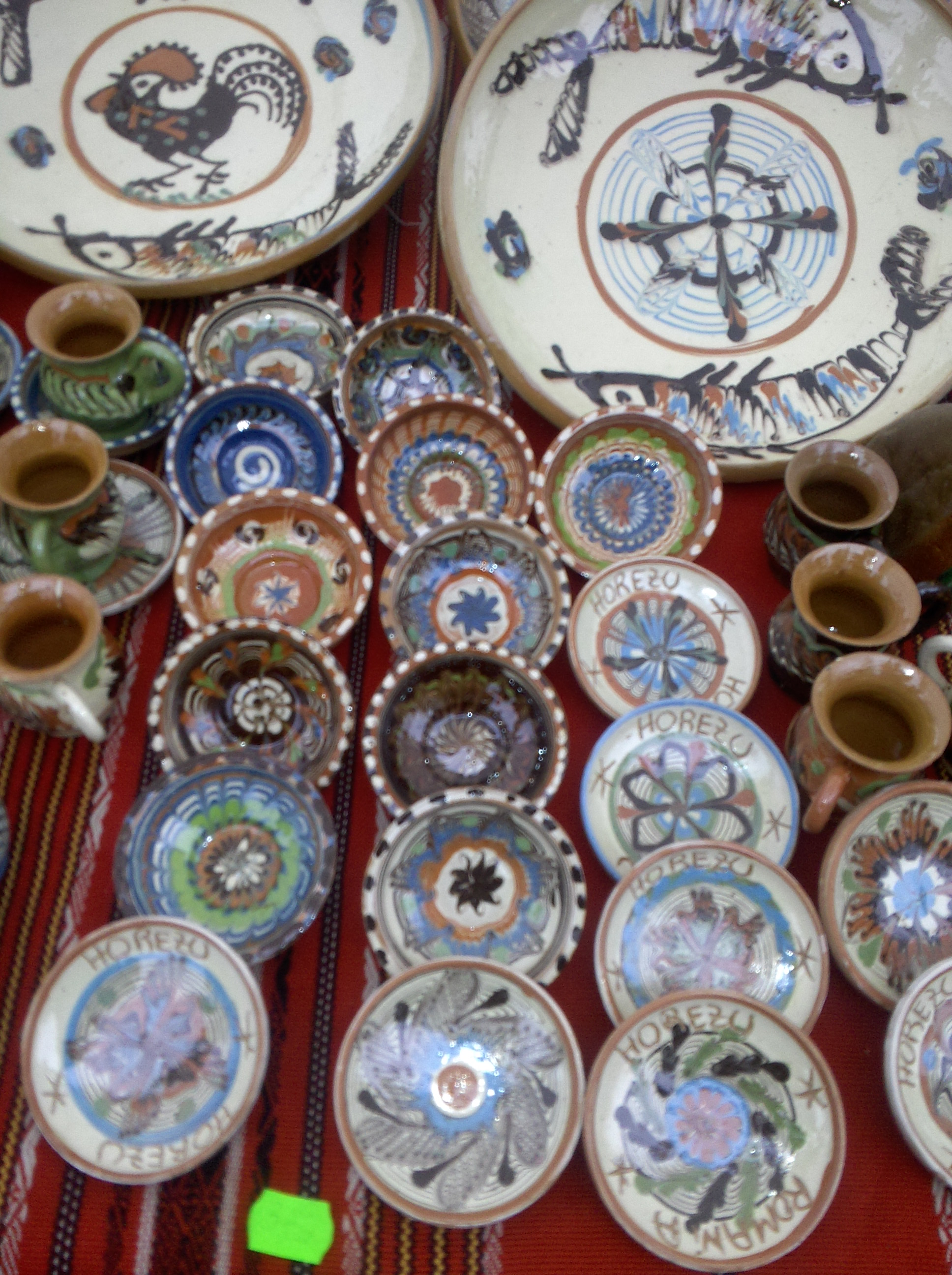
Horezu ceramics

Horezu ceramics is a unique type of Romanian pottery that is traditionally produced by hand around the town of Horezu in northern Oltenia (Vâlcea County), close to the famous Horezu Monastery. It reflects many generations of knowledge and skills development of pottery, which is why the craftsmanship of Horezu pottery was inscribed on UNESCO Intangible Cultural Heritage Lists in December 2012.

Production is divided into male and female fabrication processes. Therefore, men extract the earth, which is then cleaned, cut, watered, kneaded, trampled and mixed – transforming it into red clay that potters form in a special finger technique requiring concentration, strength and agility. Each potter has his own technique of shaping, but each respects the sequence of the process. The women decorate the shaped ceramics before firing with special techniques and tools in order to draw traditional motifs. Their skills in combining decoration and color determine the personality and uniqueness of these pieces. Colors are bright shades of brown, red, green, blue and so called "Horezu ivory". Horezu potters use many traditional tools like a mixer for cleaning the earth, a pottery wheel and comb for shaping, a hollowed-out bull's horn and a fine wire-tipped stick for decoration, and a wood-burning stove for firing.

This ancient craft is preserved in the ancestral hearth, now known as Olari Street of Horezu, where artisans shape the clay into the same painstaking process as their ancestors did. Horezu is a singular historical Romanian ceramic center in which this trade remained the main source of income for many families of potters such as: Ogrezeanu, Vicsoreanu, Iorga, Frigura, Mischiu, Popa etc. Today this craftsmanship is transmitted as always in the family circle, but also in workshops from master to apprentice, and pottery festivals and exhibitions.
