= Andrei Popescu (footballer) =

Romanian footballer

Personal information
- Full name: Andrei Sorin Popescu
- Date of birth: 20 February 1985 (age 41)
- Place of birth: Horezu, Romania
- Height: 1.82 m (6 ft 0 in)
- Position: Goalkeeper

Youth career
- 1995–2004: Olimpia Satu Mare

Senior career*
Years	Team	Apps	(Gls)
2004–2005	Someşul Satu Mare	?	(?)
2005–2012	Sportul Studenţesc	61	(0)
2012–2013	Bihor Oradea	23	(0)
2013–2015	Râmnicu Vâlcea	11	(0)
2015	SVN Zweibrücken	9	(0)
2016–2018	Eintracht Trier	27	(0)
2018–2019	FSV Salmrohr	33	(0)
2019–2023	CS Grevenmacher		
- * Club domestic league appearances and goals

Andrei Popescu (born 20 February 1985) is a Romanian former professional football, who played as a goalkeeper.
