= Văleni oil field =

Romanian oil field

Văleni
- Country: Romania
- Region: Vâlcea County
- Offshore/onshore: onshore
- Operator: Petrom

Field history
- Discovery: 2007
- Start of development: 2007
- Start of production: 2008

Production
- Current production of oil: 1,700 barrels per day (~85,000 t/a)
- Estimated oil in place: 1.4 million tonnes (~ 2×10^{6} m^{3} or 10 million bbl)

The Văleni oil field is an oil field located in Păușești, Vâlcea County, Romania. It was discovered in 2007 and developed by Petrom. It began production in 2008 and produces oil. The total proven reserves of the Văleni oil field are around 10 million barrels (1.4 million tonnes), and production is centered on 1,700 barrels per day (270 m^{3}/d).
