= Bistrița (Olt) =

Bistrița Bistrița Vâlceană
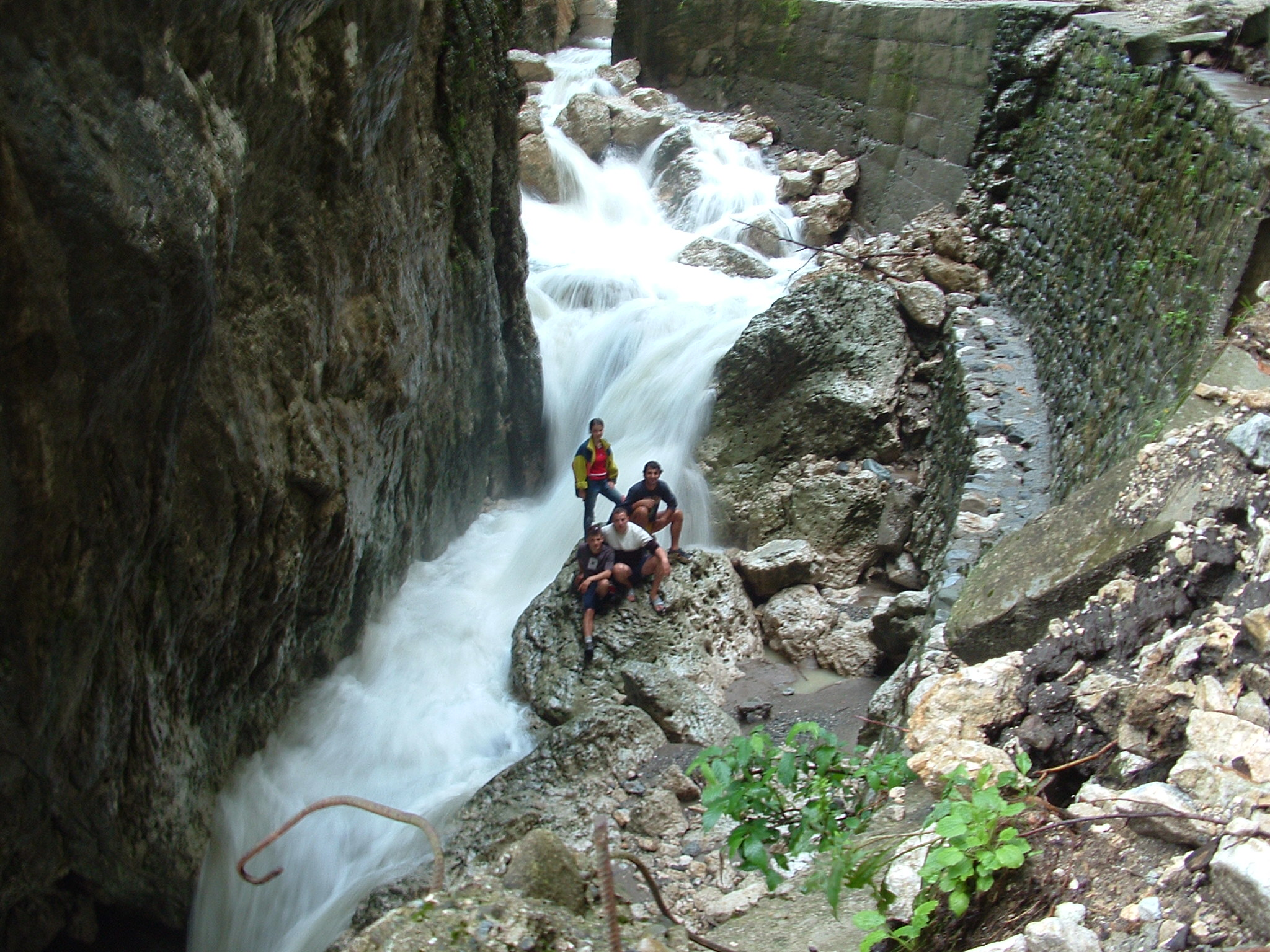
- View of the Bistrița Valley

- Location within Romania

Location
- Country: Romania
- Counties: Vâlcea County

Physical characteristics
- Mouth: Olt
  - location: Băbeni
  - coordinates: 44.9656°N 24.2721°E
- Length: 50 km (31 mi)
- Basin size: 355 km^{2} (137 sq mi)

Basin features
- Progression: Olt→ Danube→ Black Sea

Bistrița (Romanian pronunciation: [ˈbistritsa]), also known as Bistrița Vâlceană, is a right tributary of the river Olt in Romania. It discharges into the Olt near Băbeni. It starts in the Căpățânii Mountains, forming one of the narrowest gorges in Romania in addition to some beautiful caves. It flows through the villages of Bistrița, Costești, Bălțățeni, Tomșani, Foleștii de Jos and Frâncești. Its length is 50 km (31 mi) and its basin size is 355 km^{2} (137 sq mi).

== Tributaries ==
The following rivers are tributaries of the river Bistrița (from source to mouth):

- Left: Costești, Otăsău
- Right: Valea Rece, Cuca, Gurgui, Bistricioara, Iazul Morților
