= Nücü =

- Municipality
- Location within Azerbaijan
- Coordinates: 38°51′57″N 48°30′00″E
- Country: Azerbaijan
- Rayon: Lerik

Population
  - Total: 854
- Time zone: UTC+4 (AZT)
  - Summer (DST): UTC+5 (AZT)

Nücü (also, Nedzhu and Nyudzhyu) is a village and municipality in the Lerik Rayon of Azerbaijan. It has a population of 854.
