= André Favory =

French painter (1888–1937)

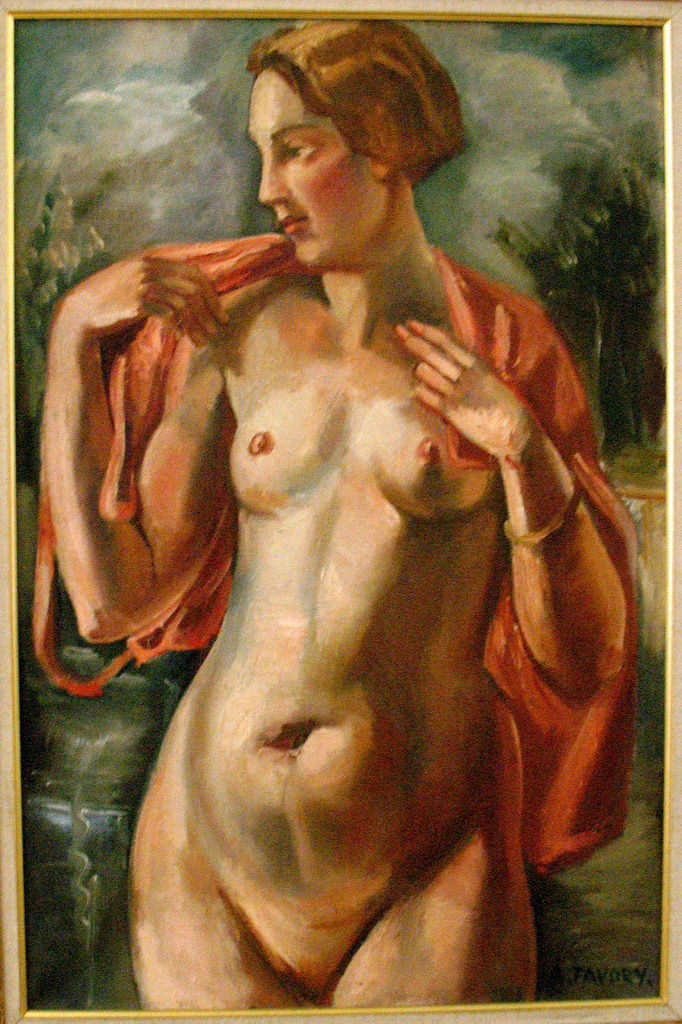

André Favory (Paris, March 9, 1888 – Paris, February 5, 1937) was a French painter and illustrator.

== Biography ==
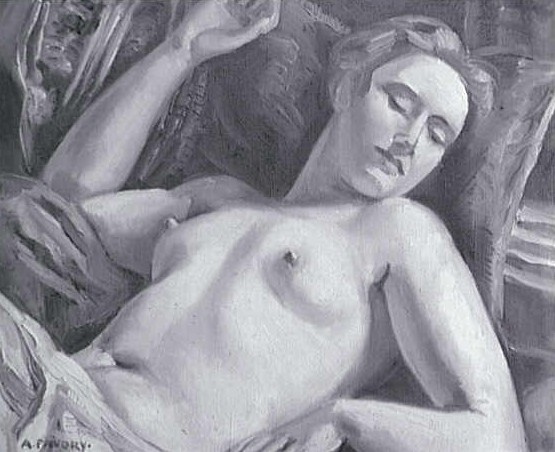
Le Repos du modèle (1924), Paris, musée national d'Art moderne.

A student of the Académie Julian, and strongly influenced by Paul Cézanne, Favory painted in a cubist style during the first years of his career.

In 1914, mobilized, he left for the First World War. When he exhibited again in 1919, the experience of the trenches had profoundly modified his conception of art. He then moved away from the Cubist movement, which he considered too intellectual, to get closer to the carnal aspects of nature and life.

He made frequent trips to Belgium to study the works of Peter Paul Rubens, who had a decisive influence on him.

Having become a master of color and movement, Favory now painted landscapes in warm tones, voluptuous nudes and sensual female portraits. He regularly exhibited at the major Salons (Salon d'automne in 1921–1923, Salon des Tuileries in 1923–1924, etc.). During the 1920s, Favory's works were exhibited in numerous galleries in Paris and Brussels, as well as in London, Amsterdam, New York and Tokyo. For critics as influential as Louis Vauxcelles, he is a major artist of his generation.

At the same time, he worked as an illustrator for works such as Les Poèmes de l'humour triste by Jules Supervielle (1919), a reprint of L'Éducation sentimentale by Gustave Flaubert (1924), Ouvert la nuit by Paul Morand (1924), Le Jeu de la "Madame Malade" by Maurice Beaubourg (1926), or Drogues et peintures, album d'art contemporain de François Quelvée (undated).

Stricken with a serious and debilitating illness, he had to stop painting in the early 1930s, and died in 1937.

== Exhibitions ==
- Yves Alix, René Durey, André Favory, Wilhelm Gimmi, Marcel Roche and Henry de Waroquier, Galerie Marcel Bernheim, 1923.

== Works in public collections ==
In France

- Several of his works, including Le Repos du modèle (1924), are held in Paris at the Musée National d'Art Moderne.

In Switzerland

- Geneva, Petit Palais : Les Baigneuses.

== Gallery ==
Œuvres non localisée attribuées à André Favory

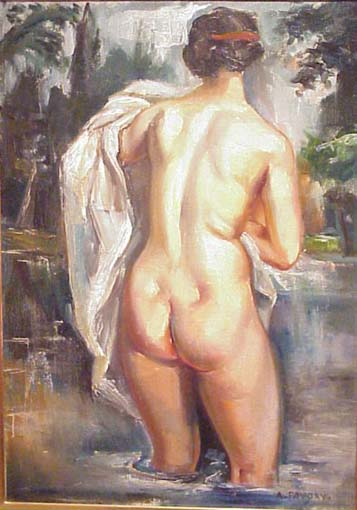
Nu au bain (1923).

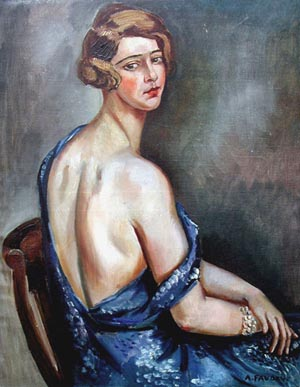
Portrait d'une élégante (1925).

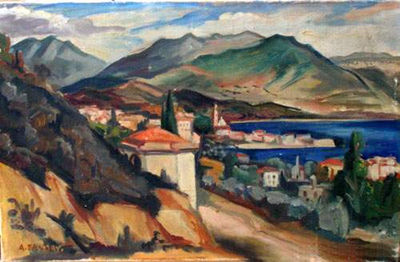
Paysage méditerranéen (1925).

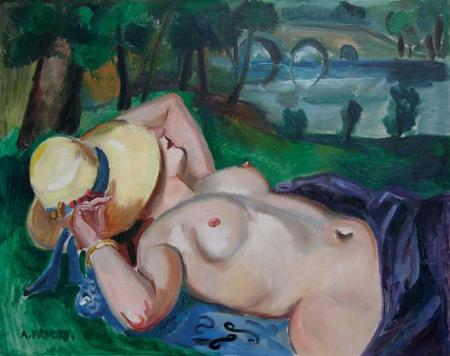
Au bord du Lac (1930).

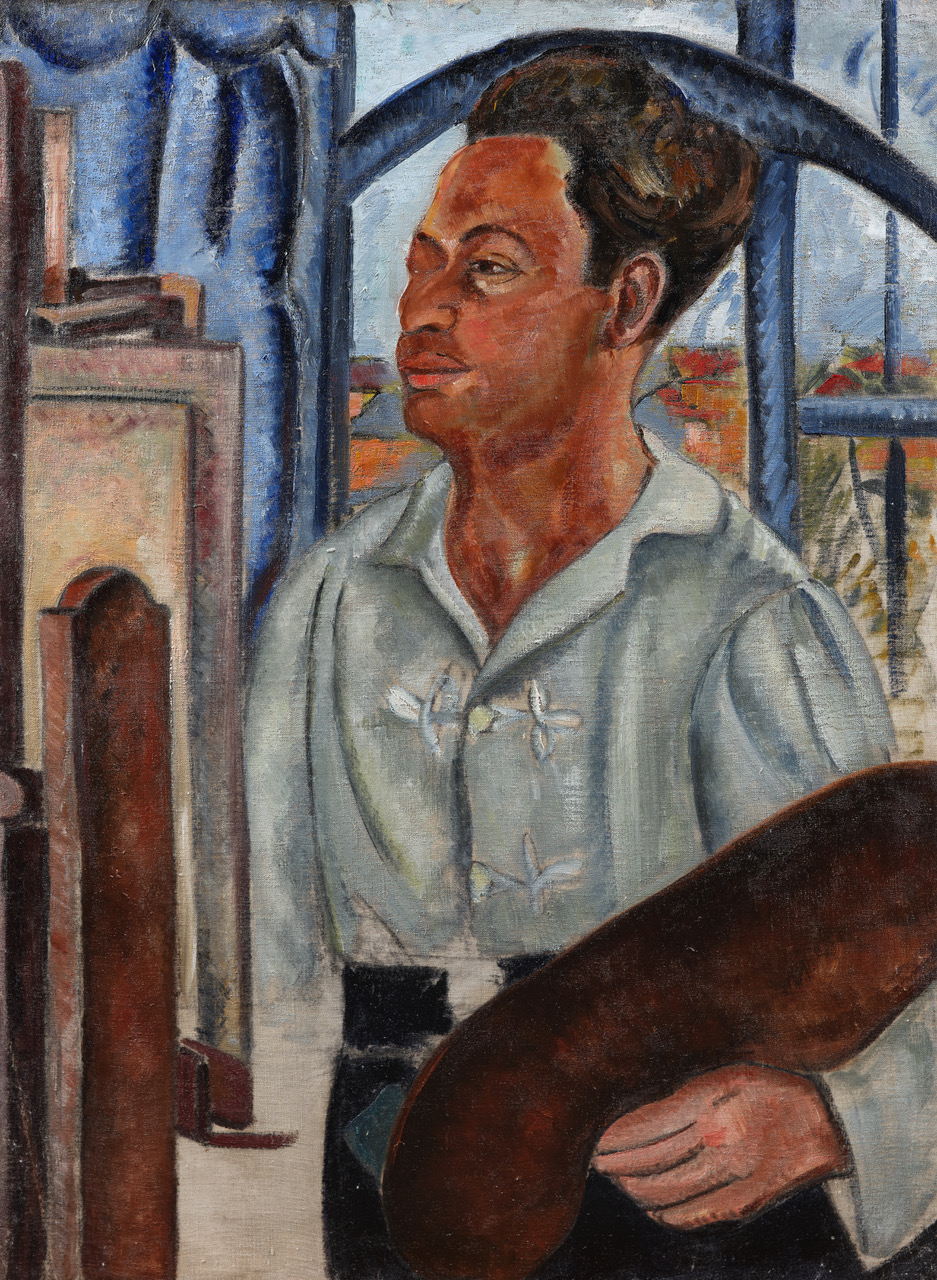
Autoportrait à la palette

== Students ==
- Marcel Chassard
- Francis Harburger
