= Pârâul Urșanilor =

- Location within Romania

Location
- Country: Romania
- Counties: Vâlcea County
- Villages: Urșani

Physical characteristics
- Mouth: Luncavăț
  - location: Horezu
  - coordinates: 45.1395°N 23.9980°E
- Length: 14 km (8.7 mi)
- Basin size: 46 km^{2} (18 sq mi)

Basin features
- Progression: Luncavăț→ Olt→ Danube→ Black Sea
- Tributaries
  - left: Râmești
  - right: Măcriș

The Pârâul Urșanilor is a left tributary of the river Luncavăț in Romania. It flows into the Luncavăț in Horezu. Its length is 14 km (8.7 mi) and its basin size is 46 km^{2} (18 sq mi).
