= Romany Marie =

American restaurateur (1885-1961)

Marie Marchand
- Marie Marchand c. early 1930s
- Born: 17 May 1885; Băbeni, Vâlcea County, Romania
- Died: 20 February 1961 (aged 75)

Marie Marchand (May 17, 1885, Băbeni, Vâlcea County — February 20, 1961, Greenwich Village, New York), known as Romany Marie, was a Greenwich Village restaurateur who played a key role in bohemianism from the early 1900s through the late 1950s in Manhattan.

== Romany Marie's cafés ==
Her cafés, which encompassed the functions of bistro and salon for the bohemian intelligentsia, were popular restaurants which attracted the core of the Greenwich Village cultural scene, "hot spots for creative types," which she considered centers for her "circle of thinking people," the circle which she had sought since 1901 when she arrived in the United States from Romanian Moldavia at the age of sixteen.

Romany Marie's cafés were among the most interesting in New York's Bohemia and had an extensive following. More salons than taverns, they were places for the interchange and pollination of ideas, places of polarity and warmth, successful enterprises which were popular with artists. Many regulars such as inventor Buckminster Fuller and sculptors Isamu Noguchi and David Smith compared them to the cafés of Paris.

Romany Marie herself, who has been described as attractive and unusual, lively and generous, and a Village legend, was a dynamic character who provided free meals to those who needed them and was well known and beloved. She was a former anarchist who had attended Emma Goldman meetings before 1910, while she was still learning English. Although she later distanced herself from anarchism, she was described as prominent in anarchy and socialism by The New York Times as late as 1915.

She became a leader in Greenwich Village, and not only among the habitués of her own establishments. For example, in June 1921, when there were public protests after the Washington Square Association brought charges against "the tea rooms and dancing places of the village" for immorality, The Times credited a local pastor's letter of approval to 'Dear Romany Marie' as the turning point in the crisis.

== Habitués ==
Painter John French Sloan was a regular from 1912 until 1935 when he returned to Chelsea. His vivid portrait of Romany Marie, painted in 1920, is now in the Whitney Museum of American Art. There are still a number of prints in existence of his 1922 etching, Romany Marye in Christopher Street.

Poet Edna St. Vincent Millay wrote the famous quatrain that begins My candle burns at both ends, which at the time she called "My Candle" and later re-titled "First Fig," at Romany Marie's in 1915 or 1916 during a visit with Charles Edison, his fiancée Carolyn Hawkins, and others.

Playwright Eugene O'Neill was one of many needy artists whom Romany Marie fed when they could not pay for meals. She was said to have kept O'Neill alive during 1916 and 1917 by feeding him regularly in her kitchen when he was an alcoholic.

When visionary architect Buckminster Fuller first visited in the late 1910s with his wife and his father-in-law, the architect and muralist James Monroe Hewlett, the only people present in the restaurant when they arrived were Romany Marie and O'Neill: "The entire evening was devoted to conversation with those two unique individuals."

Sculptor Isamu Noguchi first visited in October 1929. He had been in Paris on a Guggenheim Fellowship and had been working for several months with Constantin Brâncuși, who recommended that he visit Romany Marie's when he returned to the United States. Brâncuși—like Marie, of Romanian heritage—was an old friend of hers in Paris and New York; he also visited Romany Marie's with Henri Matisse.

Fuller was living in Greenwich Village by then and was a regular at Marie's. By informal arrangement he delivered lectures in a style he called "thinking out loud" several times per week, which "were well received by a fascinated clientele." He also took on Marie's interior decoration, with shiny aluminum paint and aluminum furniture, in exchange for meals. Models of the Dymaxion house were exhibited at Romany Marie's, and Fuller and Noguchi were soon collaborating on the Dymaxion car.

Arctic explorer Vilhjalmur Stefansson, a regular for many years, also brought fellow Explorers Club members such as Peter Freuchen, Lowell Thomas, and Sir George Hubert Wilkins. Novelist Fannie Hurst was also a regular, particularly during the years when she and Stefansson were having a long affair.

Stefansson hired Ruth Gruber as a translator of German documents, which he needed for his study of the Arctic countries for the War Department, having met Gruber at Romany Marie's in 1931 or 1932 after her return from the University of Cologne at age 20 with her doctorate. Years later, in 1941, Stefansson met his future wife Evelyn Schwartz Baird at Romany Marie's.

Paleontologist Walter Granger, another Explorers Club member, was said to have been equally at home in the "elite chambers" of the American Museum of Natural History as when camped in a field hunting for fossils or hanging out with the bohemians at Romany Marie's.

Museum of Modern Art curator Dorothy Canning Miller was a regular, as was her husband Holger Cahill, whose selection of paintings from Mark Tobey's 1929 solo exhibition at Romany Marie's was a turning point in Tobey's career.

Lionel Abel, who came to the Village in 1929, was one of those who depended on Romany Marie's generosity. Theodore Dreiser was an occasional visitor; he preferred Lüchow's on 14th Street. Arshile Gorky met with friends and colleagues at Romany Marie's two or three nights a week. David Smith hung out at Romany Marie's and other establishments with Gorky, Joseph Stella, John D. Graham, Willem de Kooning, Stuart Davis and others who briefly formed an abstract expressionist group which preceded what became known as "The Club."

One of the features of Romany Marie's establishments was the "Poets' Table" where "The Tramp Poet" Harry Kemp held forth with poets and non-poets alike including Paul Robeson, Edgard Varèse, and Marsden Hartley. Nearly half a century after Kemp's first visit in 1912, Romany Marie's was the first stop on the 1960 pilgrimage his friends undertook according to his tape recorded last wishes, "I want half my ashes to be scattered over the dunes in Provincetown and the other half in Greenwich Village."

The thing is, in the fantastically mixed atmosphere we had, even the misfits and the lonely could get direction because there was nothing mushy or poshy about the atmosphere. Can you imagine in the same night, among the guests, Dreiser and Durant and John Cowper Powys, not like celebrities but being themselves? My long-time friend, Vilhjalmur Stefansson, compared it to the Columbia University Library. There, he said, people added volumes to their knowledge; at my place they added friends.

— Romany Marie,

== Locations ==
The first location, rented in 1914 near Sheridan Square at 133 Washington Place on the third floor of a four-story building, was reached by climbing one outside staircase and two inside staircases.

From 1915 through 1923, Romany Marie's was in a tiny house at 20 Christopher Street, and, from 1923 through the late 1920s, at 170 1/2 Waverly Place.

The eleven locations over the years—"The caravan has moved" was the sign on the door each time with the new address—also included:

- 15 Minetta Street, on a branch—"only a surveyor could find it"—of tiny Minetta Lane.
- 55 Grove Street, next to the Thomas Paine building at 59 Grove home of Marie's Crisis restaurant, now a piano bar, named for its owner Marie Du Mont and Paine's Crisis pamphlet.
- 40 West 8th Street (St. Mark's Place).
- 64 Washington Square South (West 4th Street).
- The basement of the Hotel Brevoort on the northeast corner of Fifth Avenue and 8th Street where Fifth Avenue originates at Washington Square.

== Biography ==
Romany Marie Marchand was of Jewish descent, it was said born in Nichitoaia, Vâlcea district, Romania in 1885., but in fact în Răchitoasa, in the region of Bacău, also in Romania. Her father was Lupu Yuster, probably Jew (his name is Jewish) and her mother, Esther Rosen, was a Jew. In the villages of Vâlcea district there were no Jews, generally.

Marie, her sister Rose (who married Leonard Dalton Abbott in 1915), their brother David (the youngest), and their mother Esther (known as Mother Yuster, her portrait was painted by Robert Henri), were all active in the Modern Schools (Ferrer Schools) in New York City and in Stelton, Piscataway Township, New Jersey. Her sister Rebecca, who followed Marie to the United States, died in her 20's in New York City.

Romany Marie's "centers" for her "circle of thinking people" began in 1912 in their three-room apartment on St. Mark's Place in the East Village, and later in their rented house in The Bronx, before opening in Greenwich Village in 1914.

Her husband Arnold Damon Marchand, also known as A. D. or AD Marchand, was an unlicensed but apparently effective osteopath. He once treated Mabel Dodge Luhan's husband Tony Luhan for a slipped disc, in the winter of 1940, when Luhan and author Frank Waters were visiting New York from Taos, New Mexico.

Author Ben Reitman included Romany Marie among the characters in his fictional autobiography Sister of the Road (1937), which Martin Scorsese adapted for the 1972 film Boxcar Bertha. In the mysteries Free Love and Murder Me Now (2001), which are set in the Village in the early 1920s during Prohibition, author Annette Meyers included both Romany Marie and her husband A. D. Marchand, called Damon, among the characters.

Journalist Robert Schulman, a co-founder of the Louisville Eccentric Observer, was Romany Marie Marchand's nephew. During his youth in New York City he visited her frequently in Greenwich Village. In adulthood, whenever he was in the city, he recorded oral history interviews with her and with many of her devotees. Schulman, whose biography of John Sherman Cooper was published in 1976, published his biography of "that bohemian aunt ... with little regard for profit but with central regard for giving unconventional and creative people a place at little cost to talk, think, perform and ponder" in 2006. He died at the age of 91 on January 6, 2008.

== See also ==
- Konrad Bercovici
- Helios Gómez
- Mariano R. Vázquez
