= Ivanovca, Hîncești =

Ivanovca
- Commune
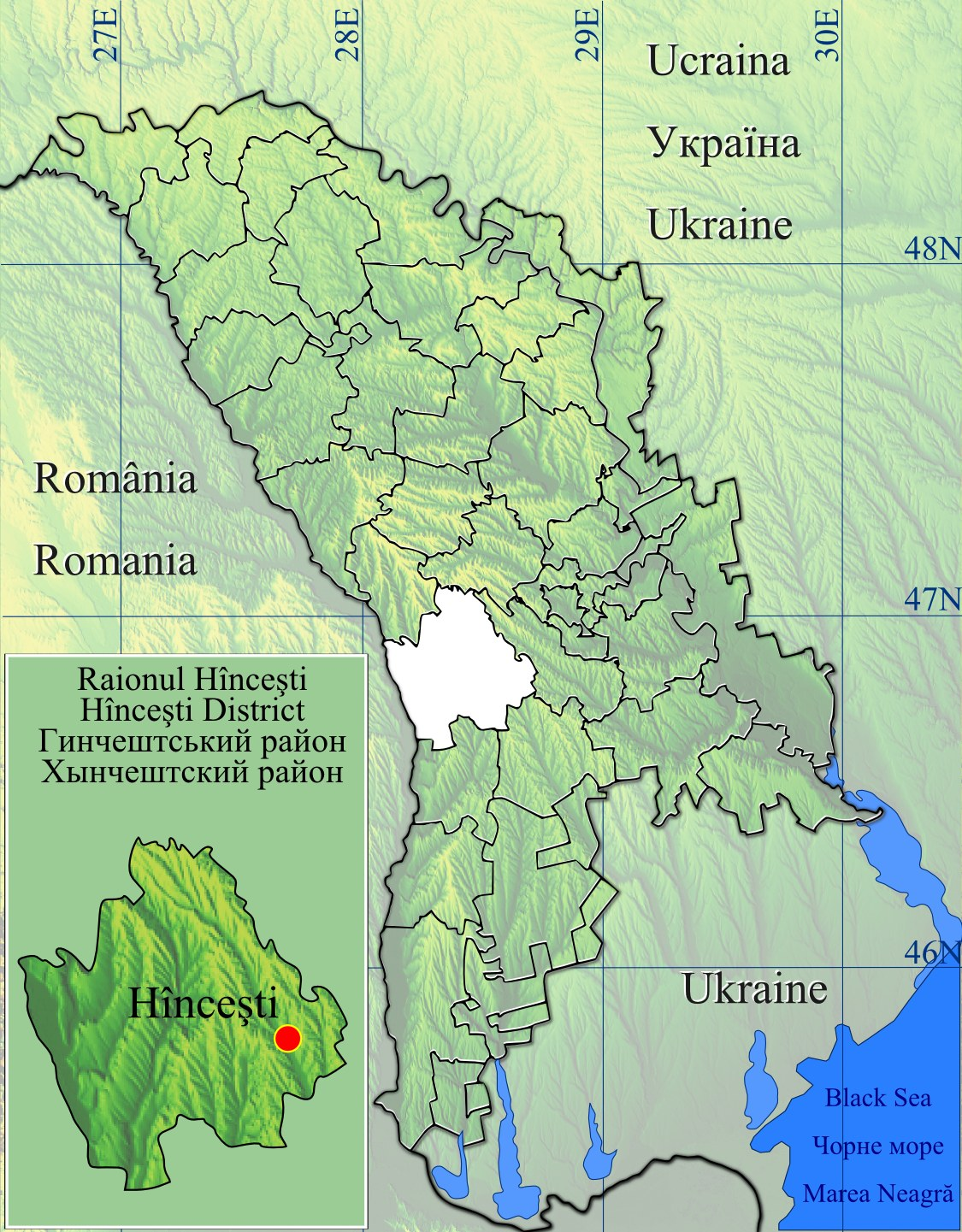
- Location within Hîncești
- Coordinates: 46°52′30″N 28°11′33″E
- Country: Moldova
- District: Hîncești District

Population (2014)
  - Total: 999
- Time zone: UTC+2 (EET)
  - Summer (DST): UTC+3 (EEST)
- Postal code: MD-3430

Ivanovca is a commune in Hînceşti District, Moldova. It is composed of three villages: Costești, Frasin and Ivanovca.
