= Sacha Kolin =

French-born American painter (1911–1981)

- Born: 9 May 1911; Paris, France
- Died: 14 February 1981 (aged 69); New York City, United States

Sacha Kolin (9 May 1911 (Paris, France) – 14 February 1981 (New York City, United States)) was a French-born painter. She lived in Austria and other countries for several years before settling in the United States.

== Life and work ==
Kolin was born in Paris to Ukrainian Jews Julius and Malwina Kolin. She spent parts of her early life in Argentina and Hungary before her parents settled in Vienna. Kolin trained at Vienna's School of Arts and Crafts and the Academy of Fine Arts before moving to Paris in 1933 to study under Naoum Lvovich Aronson. She exhibited at the Paris Salon from 1934 to 1936.

Concerned with Nazi persecution of Jews in nearby Germany, Kolin's family emigrated to the United States in 1936 and settled in New York City. The family were well-to-do, and chose prestigious Manhattan residences such as Essex House and the Esplanade. Kolin soon began exhibiting her art at venues including Rockefeller Center and the 1940 World's Fair.

In the 1970s, Kolin was an avid participant in third-party donations to museums encouraged by the Tax Reform Act of 1969. She would convince a museum curator to provide a letter indicating that the museum would like to add her artwork to its collection. She would then sell a painting at a discount to a wealthy collector. The collector would donate the painting to the museum, receiving a tax deduction for the market value of the painting. After Kolin's death, several artists and collectors were prosecuted for this scam.

Kolin had expensive tastes in food and fashion, and in her later life, when her artwork failed to sell consistently, she fell into debt, borrowing money to feed her pricey habits, or trading artwork for goods. She produced and distributed so much artwork in this fashion that the value of her work dropped. With the landlords of successive grand apartments, Kolin bartered artwork for rent, and with her two large dogs turned at least one dwelling into a squalid mess.

Kolin was a longtime friend of artist Ray Johnson and an early member of his New York Correspondence School.

== Art ==
Kolin's artwork has been exhibited at the New York World's Fair, the Brooklyn Museum, the Boston Museum of Fine Arts, and the Whitney Museum of American Art among numerous other venues, and her art is in the collections of the Smithsonian American Art Museum and the Cooper-Hewitt National Design Museum among others. She produced abstract paintings and aeronautically-inspired, Minimalist sculpture.

=== Sources ===
- Thaler, Lisa (2008). Look Up: The Life and Art of Sacha Kolin. New York, NY: Midmarch Arts Press. p. 22. ISBN 978-1-877675-68-3.
