= Frâncești =

- Commune
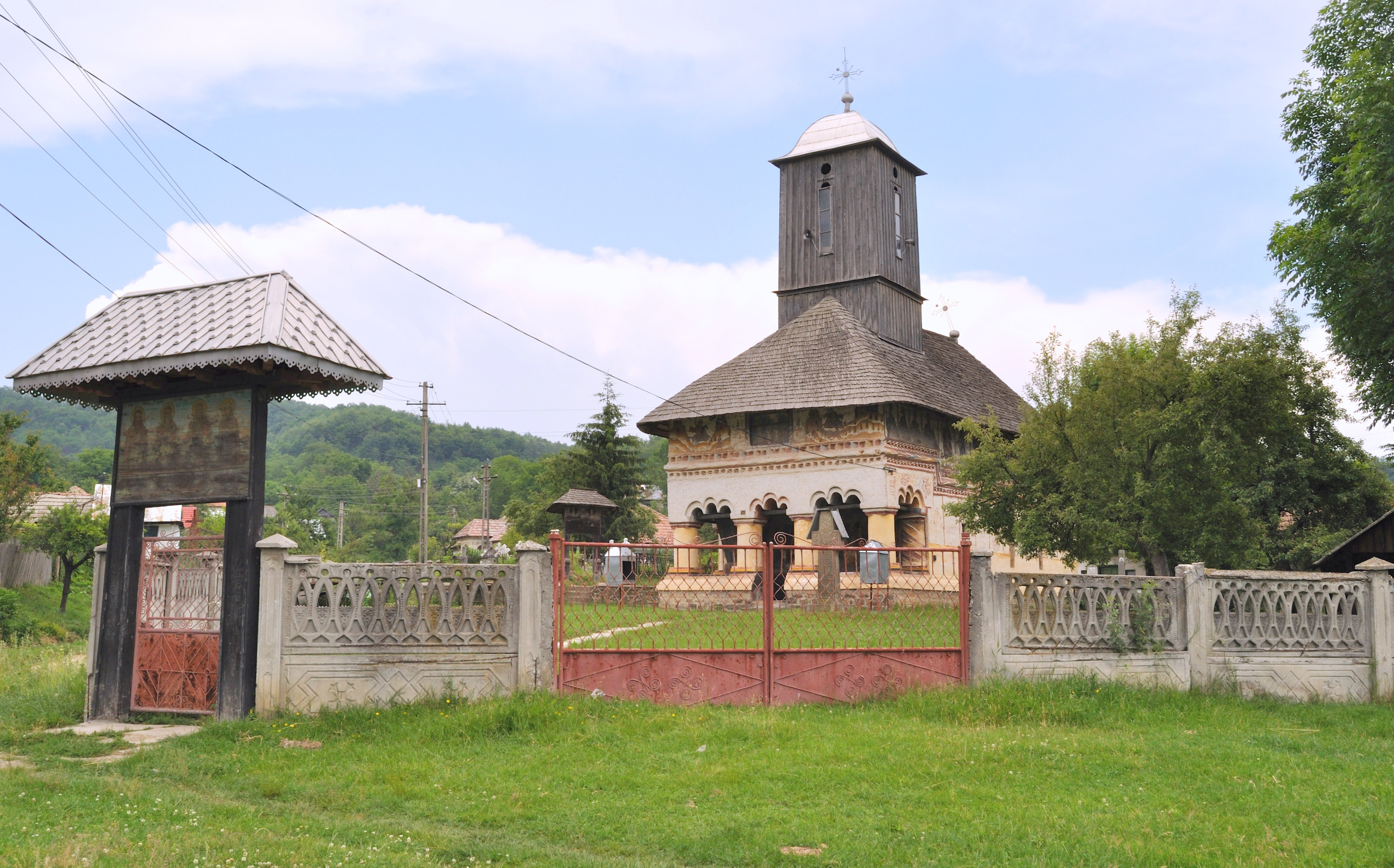
- Three Hierarchs Church in Genuneni

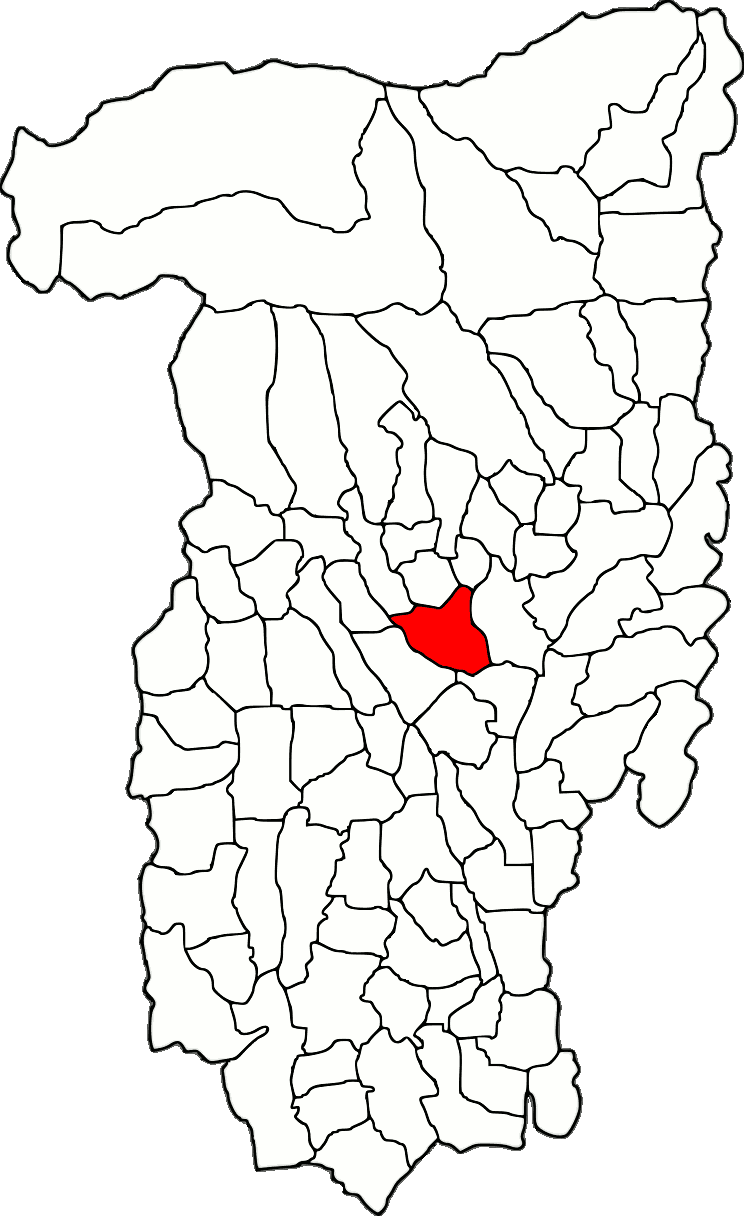
- Location in Vâlcea County

- Location in Romania
- Coordinates: 45.0130°N 24.1611°E
- Country: Romania
- County: Vâlcea

Government
  - Mayor (2020–2024): Daniel Florin Paraschiv (PNL)
- Area: 62.25 km^{2} (24.03 sq mi)
- Elevation: 236 m (774 ft)
- Population (2021-12-01): 4,989
  - Density: 80.14/km^{2} (207.6/sq mi)
- Time zone: UTC+02:00 (EET)
  - Summer (DST): UTC+03:00 (EEST)
- Postal code: 247195
- Area code: +(40) 250
- Vehicle reg.: VL
- Website: primariafrancesti-valcea.ro

Frâncești is a commune located in Vâlcea County, Oltenia, Romania. It is composed of nine villages: Băluțoaia, Coșani, Dezrobiți, Frâncești, Genuneni, Mănăilești, Moșteni, Surpatele, and Viișoara.

The commune is situated in a hilly region, in the southern foothills of the Southern Carpathians, at an altitude of 236 m (774 ft). It lies on the banks of the river Bistrița and its left tributary, the Otăsău.

Frâncești is located in the central part of Vâlcea County, 24 km (15 mi) southwest of the county seat, Râmnicu Vâlcea. It is crossed by county road DJ646, which branches off the national road DN64 in the town of Băbeni, 6 km (3.7 mi) to the southeast.

The commune is known for two Romanian Orthodox monasteries — Mănăstirea Dintr-un Lemn and Surpatele Monastery — and for the churches in Genuneni and Viișoara.
