= Bogdănești, Moldova =

Bogdănești
- Commune
- Location in Moldova
- Coordinates: 48°08′N 27°00′E
- Country: Moldova
- District: Briceni District

Population (2014)
  - Total: 1,169
- Time zone: UTC+2 (EET)
  - Summer (DST): UTC+3 (EEST)

Bogdănești is a commune in Briceni District, Moldova. It is composed of three villages: Bezeda, Bogdănești and Grimești.
