= Gornet =

- Commune
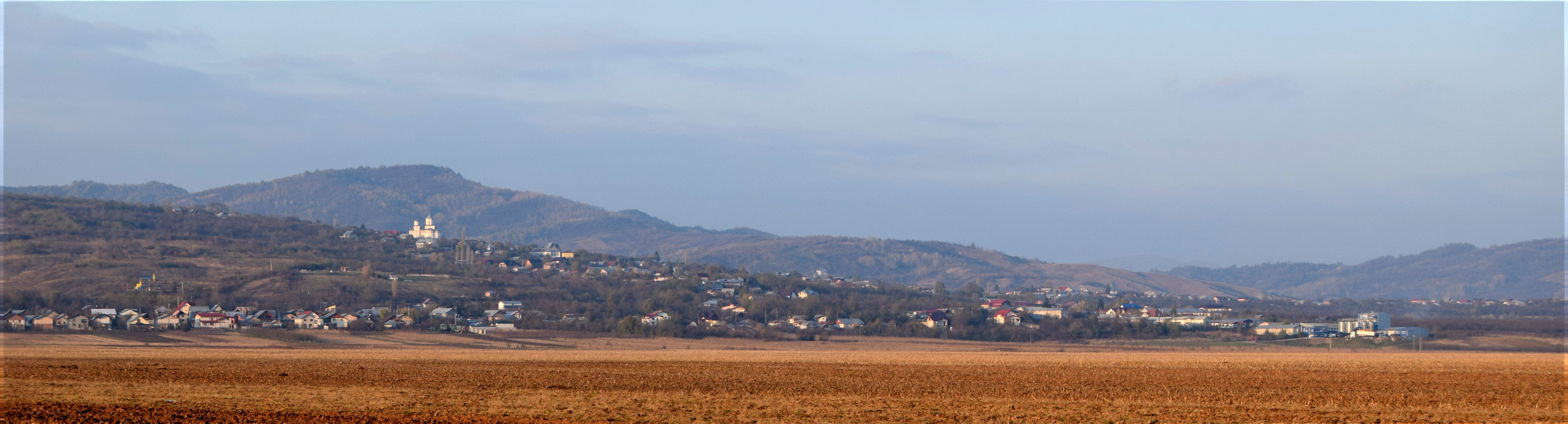
- Gornet village

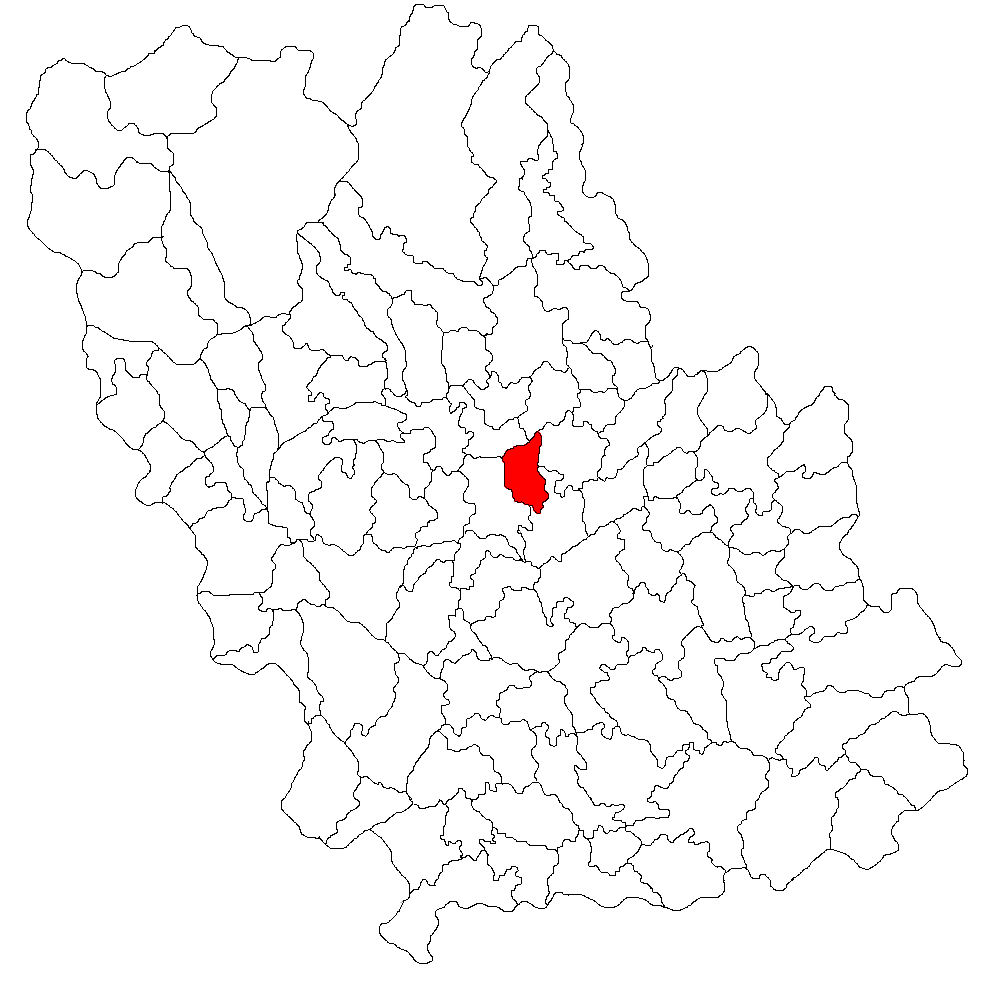
- Location in Prahova County

- Location in Romania
- Coordinates: 45°07′N 26°04′E
- Country: Romania
- County: Prahova

Government
  - Mayor (2020–2024): Nicolae Negoițescu (PSD)
- Area: 26.37 km^{2} (10.18 sq mi)
- Elevation: 330 m (1,080 ft)
- Population (2021-12-01): 2,670
  - Density: 101/km^{2} (262/sq mi)
- Time zone: UTC+02:00 (EET)
  - Summer (DST): UTC+03:00 (EEST)
- Postal code: 107285
- Area code: +(40) 244
- Vehicle reg.: PH
- Website: www.primariagornet.ro

Gornet is a commune in Prahova County, Muntenia, Romania. It is composed of four villages: Bogdănești, Cuib, Gornet, and Nucet.

Historical population
Year	Pop.	±%
2002	3,126	—
2011	2,928	−6.3%
2021	2,670	−8.8%
Source: Census data

At the 2002 census, the commune had a population of 3,126; all inhabitants were ethnic Romanians and 99.9% were Romanian Orthodox. At the 2021 census, Gornet had a population of 2,670, of which 96.14% were Romanians.

On 22 July 2020, due to the COVID-19 pandemic authorities decided to locally quarantine this commune.
