= Costești (river) =

River in Romania

- Location within Romania

Location
- Country: Romania
- Counties: Vâlcea County
- Villages: Pietreni, Costești

Physical characteristics
- Source: Căpățânii Mountains
- Mouth: Bistrița
  - location: Costești
  - coordinates: 45.1300°N 24.0512°E
- Length: 20 km (12 mi)
- Basin size: 46 km^{2} (18 sq mi)

Basin features
- Progression: Bistrița→ Olt→ Danube→ Black Sea
- Tributaries
  - left: Ghelălău, Pârâul Sec, Saga
  - right: Pârâul lui Ignat

The Costești is a left tributary of the river Bistrița in Romania. It flows into the Bistrița in the village Costești. Its length is 20 km (12 mi) and its basin size is 46 km^{2} (18 sq mi).
