= Horezu =

- Town
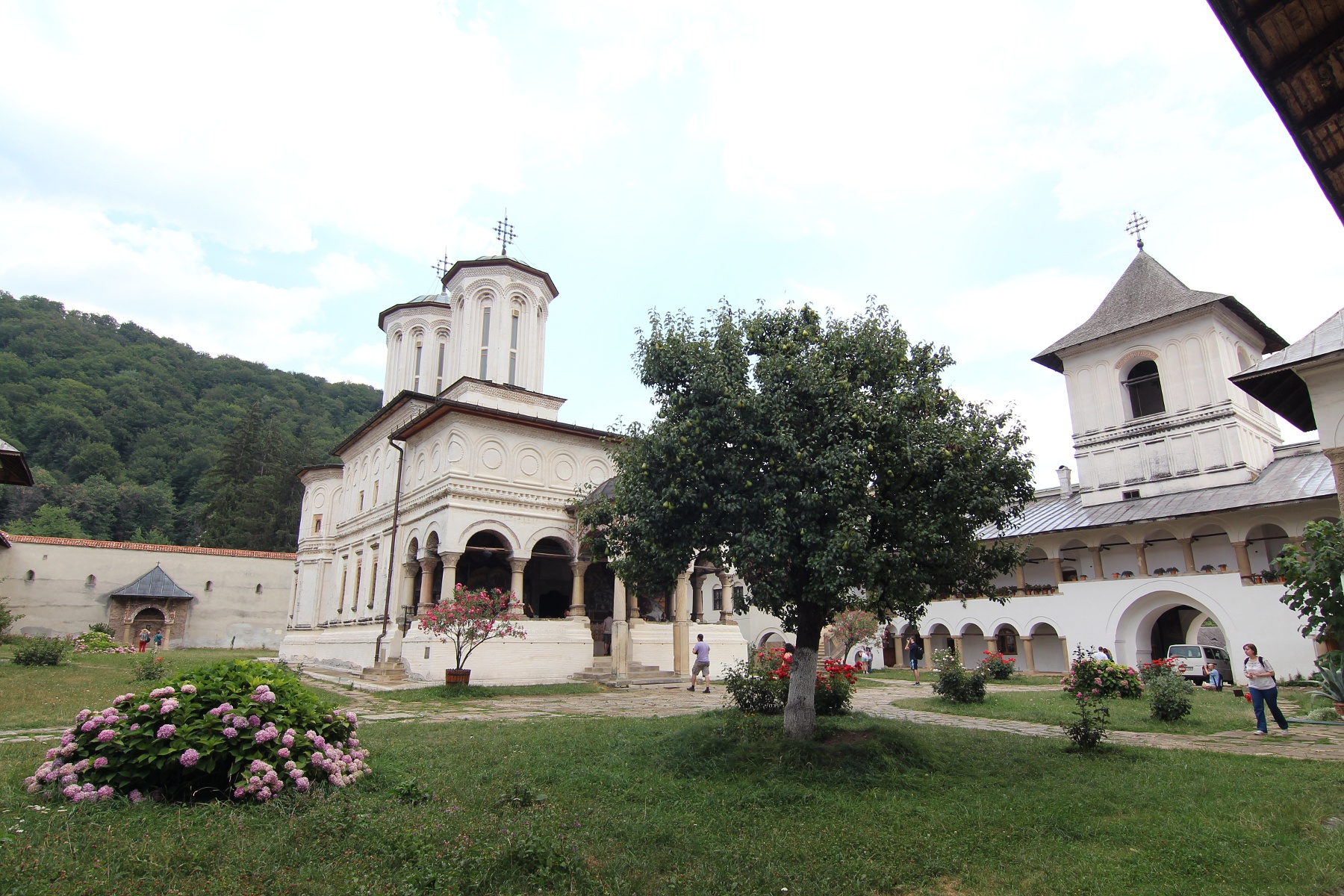
- Horezu Monastery

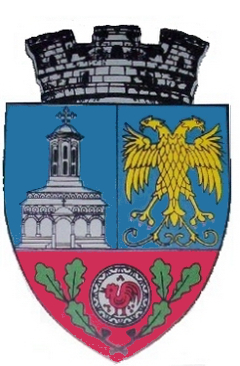
- Coat of arms

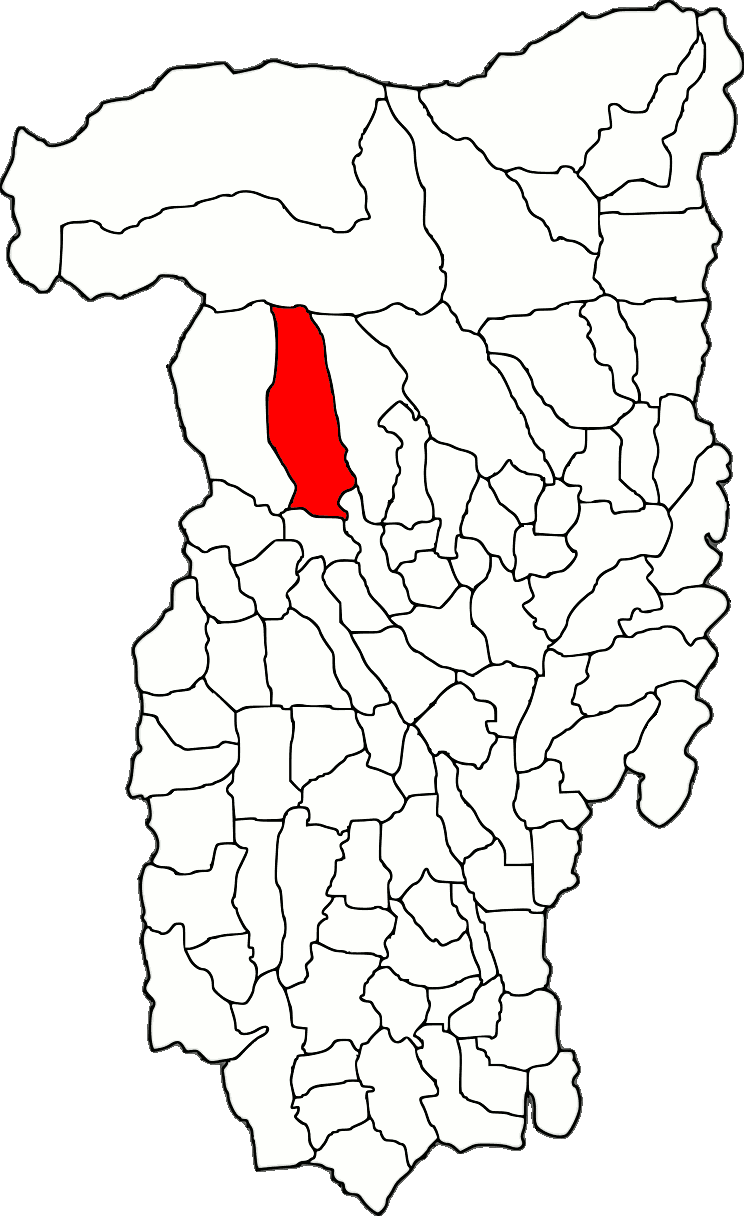
- Location in Vâlcea County

- Location in Romania
- Coordinates: 45°8′36″N 23°59′30″E
- Country: Romania
- County: Vâlcea

Government
  - Mayor (2024–2028): Nicolae Sărdărescu (PSD)
- Area: 117.69 km^{2} (45.44 sq mi)
- Elevation: 460 m (1,510 ft)
- Population (2021-12-01): 6,467
  - Density: 54.95/km^{2} (142.3/sq mi)
- Time zone: UTC+02:00 (EET)
  - Summer (DST): UTC+03:00 (EEST)
- Postal code: 245800
- Area code: (+40) 0250
- Vehicle reg.: VL
- Website: www.orasul-horezu.ro

Historical population
Year	Pop.	±%
1977	5,536	—
1992	7,282	+31.5%
2002	7,446	+2.3%
2011	6,263	−15.9%
2021	6,467	+3.3%
Source: Census data

Horezu is a town located in Vâlcea County, Oltenia, Romania. It administers six villages: Ifrimești, Râmești, Romanii de Jos, Romanii de Sus, Tănăsești, and Urșani.

Horezu is the site of Horezu Monastery, a World Heritage Site. The town is well known for its people who make pottery and present it at an annual fair (see Horezu ceramics). There are special traditions which have been well preserved.

== Geography ==
The town is situated in the foothills of the Southern Carpathians, at an altitude of 460 m (1,510 ft), on the south side of the Căpățâna Mountains. It lies on the banks of the rivers Luncavăț; Pârâul Urșanilor and its left tributary, Râmești; and Bistricioara and its right tributary, Horezu.

Horezu is located in the central part of Vâlcea County, about 40 km (25 mi) west of the county seat, Râmnicu Vâlcea. It is crossed east to west by national road DN67, which connects Râmnicu Vâlcea to Târgu Jiu and Drobeta-Turnu Severin. Route DN65C branches off here, going to Craiova, 110 km (68 mi) to the south.

== Demographics ==
As of the 2021 census, the town had 6,467 inhabitants, most of them working in agriculture and services; 94.08% are Romanians and 1.62% are Roma.

== Notable people ==
- Ana Cartianu (1908–2001), academic, essayist, and translator
- Lazăr Comănescu (b. 1949), diplomat, Minister of Foreign Affairs
- Andrei Popescu (b. 1985), footballer
- Ionela Târlea (b. 1976), track and field athlete

== Sports ==
The town is home to ACS Flacăra Horezu, a football club currently playing in Liga IV. Stadionul Treapt is a multi-purpose stadium which serves as the home ground of Flacăra Horezu.

== Twin towns and sister cities ==
Horezu is twinned with:

- Clervaux, Luxembourg
