= Oteșani =

- Commune
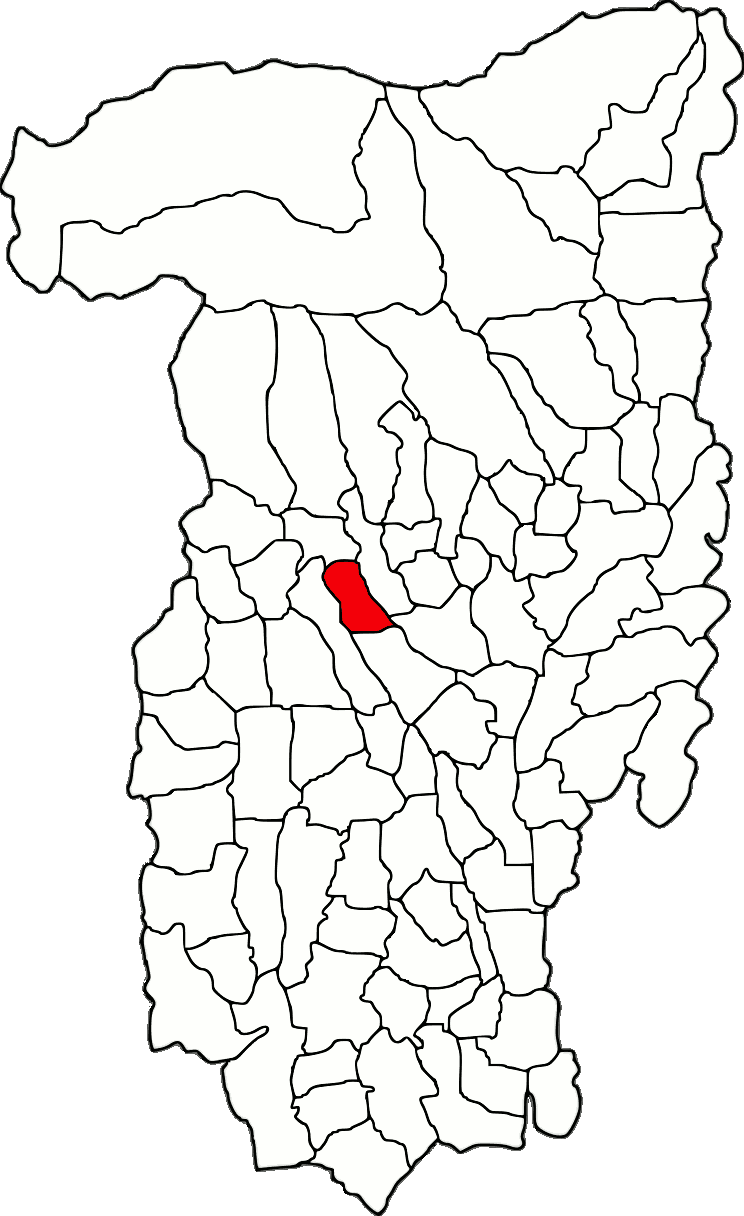
- Location in Vâlcea County

- Location in Romania
- Coordinates: 45°4′N 24°2′E
- Country: Romania
- County: Vâlcea
- Area: 34.18 km^{2} (13.20 sq mi)
- Population (2021-12-01): 2,275
  - Density: 66.56/km^{2} (172.4/sq mi)
- Time zone: UTC+02:00 (EET)
  - Summer (DST): UTC+03:00 (EEST)
- Vehicle reg.: VL

Oteșani is a commune located in Vâlcea County, Oltenia, Romania. It is composed of five villages: Bogdănești, Cârstănești, Cucești, Oteșani and Sub-Deal.
