= Băbeni =

- Town
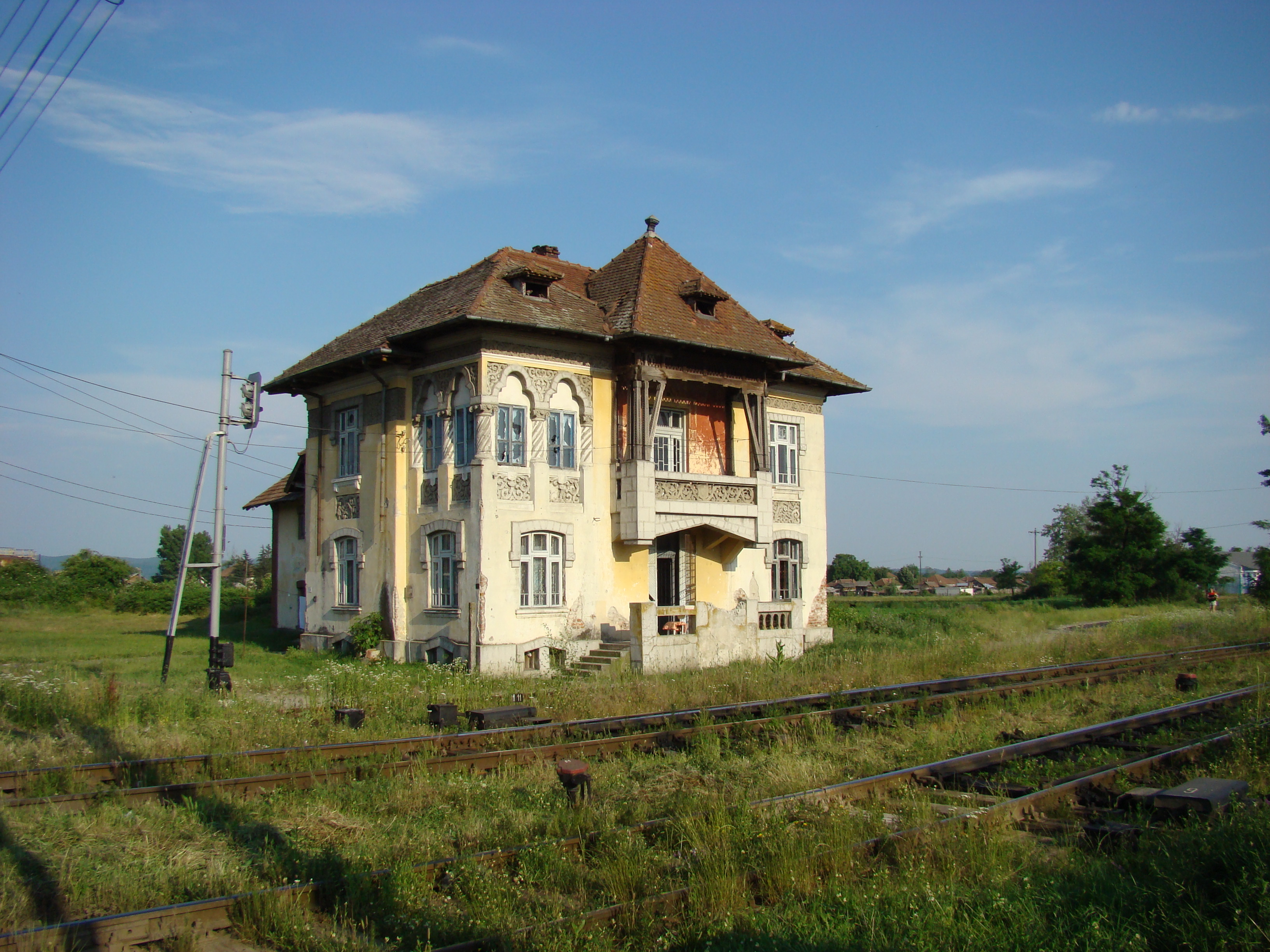
- Historical mansion in Băbeni

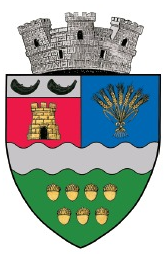
- Coat of arms

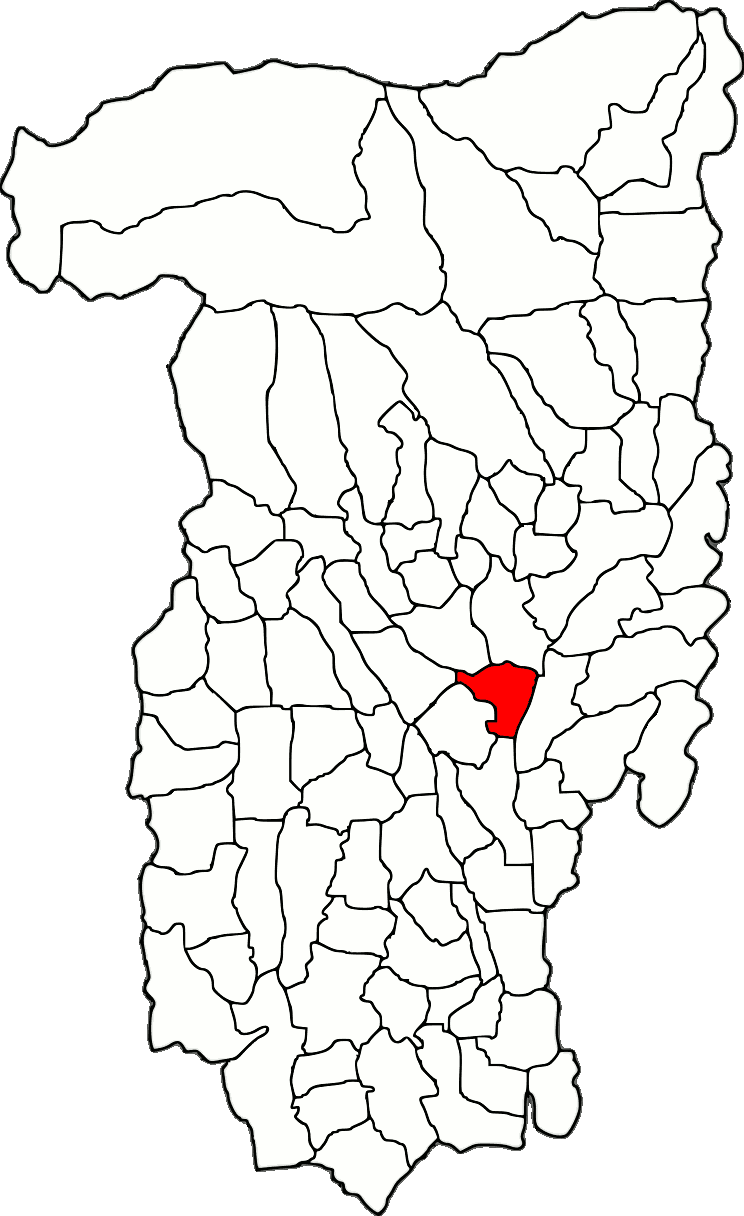
- Location in Vâlcea County

- Location in Romania
- Coordinates: 44°58′30″N 24°13′52″E
- Country: Romania
- County: Vâlcea

Government
  - Mayor (2024–2028): Ștefan Bîzîc (PNL)
- Area: 35.70 km^{2} (13.78 sq mi)
- Elevation: 220 m (720 ft)
- Population (2021-12-01): 7,570
  - Density: 212/km^{2} (549/sq mi)
- Time zone: UTC+02:00 (EET)
  - Summer (DST): UTC+03:00 (EEST)
- Postal code: 245100
- Area code: (+40) 02 50
- Vehicle reg.: VL
- Website: orasbabeni.ro

Băbeni is a town located in Vâlcea County, Romania. The town, elevated to that status in 2002, administers six villages: Bonciu, Capu Dealului, Pădurețu, Români, Tătărani, and Valea Mare. It is situated in the historical region of Oltenia.

The town is located in the central part of the county, on the right bank of the Olt River, 18 km (11 mi) southwest of the county seat, Râmnicu Vâlcea. It is crossed by national road DN64, which connects Râmnicu Vâlcea with Caracal along the Olt River. The Băbeni train station serves the CFR Line 201, which runs north–south from Podu Olt, Sibiu County, to Piatra-Olt, Olt County.

The Băbeni oil field is located on the administrative territory of the town.

Historical population
Year	Pop.	±%
2002	9,475	—
2011	8,022	−15.3%
2021	7,570	−5.6%
Source: Census data

== Notable people ==
- Radu Bîrzan (born 1999), footballer
- Romany Marie (1885 — 1961), Greenwich Village restaurateur
