= Costești, Vâlcea =

Costești
- Commune
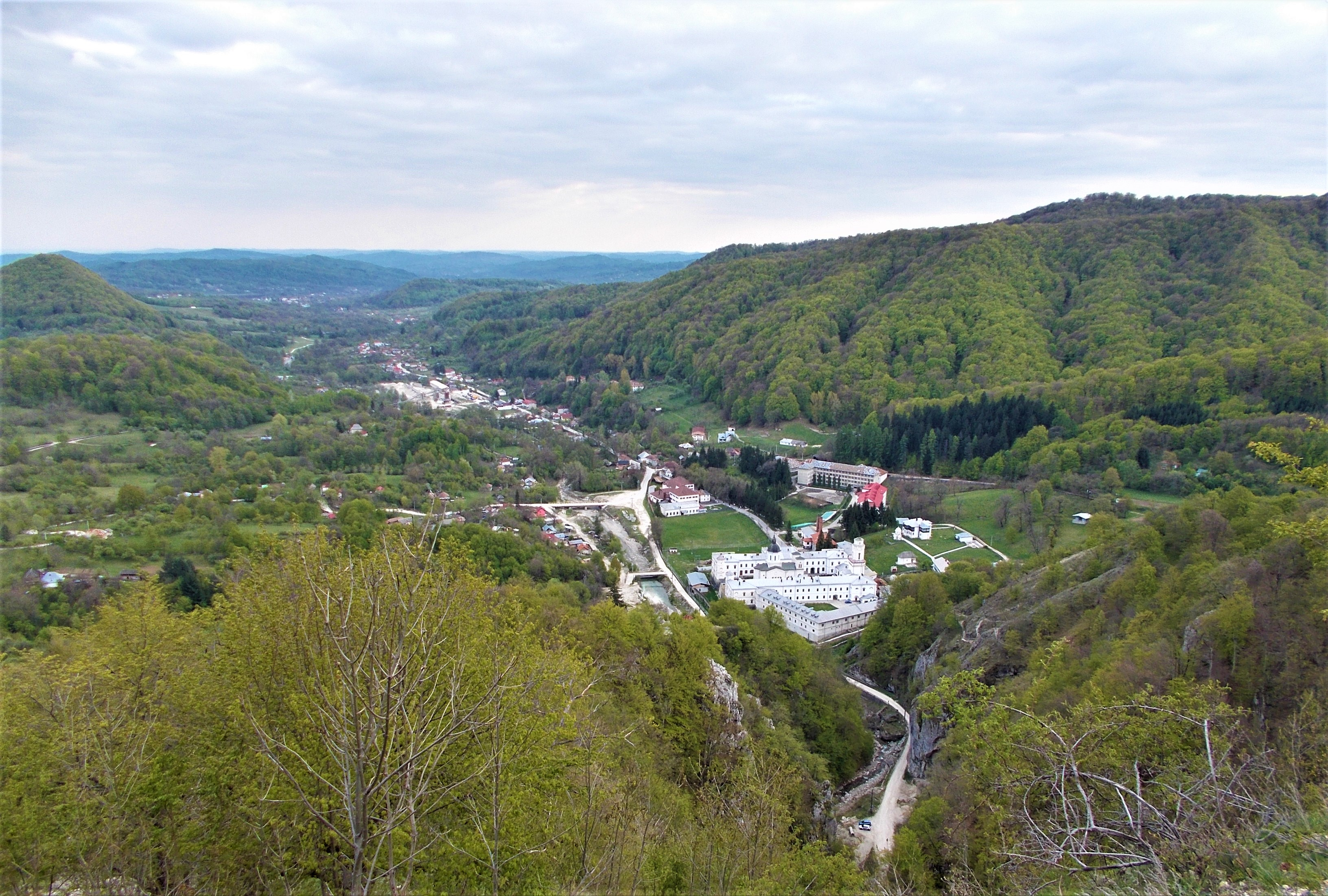
- View of Bistrița village, with Bistrița Monastery in the foreground

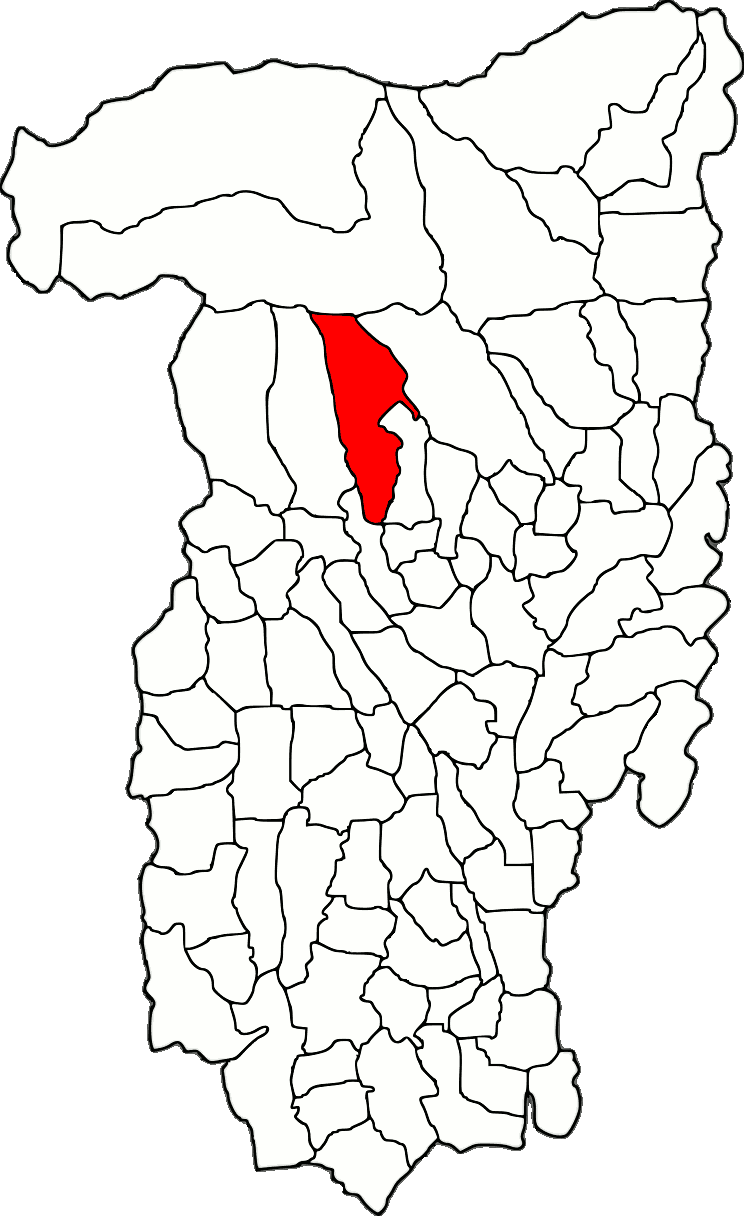
- Location in Vâlcea County

- Location in Romania
- Coordinates: 45°9′N 24°4′E
- Country: Romania
- County: Vâlcea

Government
  - Mayor (2020–2024): Toma-Marius Peștereanu (PSD)
- Area: 100.2 km^{2} (38.7 sq mi)
- Elevation: 452 m (1,483 ft)
- Population (2021-12-01): 2,738
  - Density: 27.33/km^{2} (70.77/sq mi)
- Time zone: UTC+02:00 (EET)
  - Summer (DST): UTC+03:00 (EEST)
- Postal code: 247115–247118
- Vehicle reg.: VL
- Website: www.comuna-costesti.ro

Costești is a commune located in Vâlcea County, Oltenia, Romania. It is composed of four villages: Bistrița, Costești, Văratici, and Pietreni.

The commune is located in the central-north part of the county, in the foothills of the Southern Carpathians, some 32 km (20 mi) west of the county seat, Râmnicu Vâlcea. The river Bistrița (also known as Bistrița Vâlceană) and its tributary, the Costești, flow through the commune.

Costești is traversed by national road DN67, which connects Râmnicu Vâlcea to Târgu Jiu and Drobeta-Turnu Severin further west.

Arnota Monastery and Bistrița Monastery are located in Costești. Part of the Buila-Vânturarița National Park is situated on the territory of the commune.
