= 2014–15 CS Universitatea Craiova season =

Universitatea Craiova
2014–15 season
- Chairman: George Simion
- Manager: Ionel Gane (July–August); Emil Săndoi (September–May)
- Stadium: Ion Oblemenco; Extensiv
- Liga I: 5th
- Cupa României: Quarter-finals
- Cupa Ligii: Play-off round
- Top goalscorer: League: Tha'er Bawab (9 goals); All: Tha'er Bawab (9 goals)
- Highest home attendance: 25,000 vs FCSB (December 4, 2014)
- Lowest home attendance: 1,000 vs CFR Cluj (May 30, 2015)
- Average home league attendance: 5,705
- Biggest win: Craiova 3-0 U Cluj; Craiova 3-0 CFR Cluj
- Biggest defeat: Astra Giurgiu 5-0 Craiova
Home colours	Away colours	Third colours

The 2014–15 season was the 44th season of competitive football for Universitatea Craiova, and the first season for a team from Craiova in Liga I since 2011. Universitatea Craiova were promoted to the top league of the Romanian football league system after winning the 2013–14 Liga II season (Seria II).

== Previous season positions ==
	Competition	Position
(Romania)	Liga II	1st
(Romania)	Cupa României	Fifth round

== Kit ==
Supplier: Joma / Sponsors: Sticky (back)

Universitatea Craiova signed a deal with manufacturer Joma after having used Macron in the previous season. The team presented the kit and the new signings on the 21st of June.

Home	Away	Third Kit	Fourth kit	Goalkeeper

- Home: The home kit is striped and in the traditional blue and white colors. This kit used the striped crest of the sports club until April, and then switched to the lion crest.
- Away: The away kit was all white with blue trims on the shorts. This kit used the striped crest for the entirety of the season.
- Third: The third kit had the same design as the home kit, but in black and yellow colors. It was unpopular with the fans, who wanted their team to play in blue or in white, and was used only once.
- Fourth: The fourth kit consisted of green shirts, black shorts and black socks. It was unpopular with the fans, who wanted their team to play in blue or in white, and was used only once.

== Players ==
=== Squad information ===
No.	Player	Nat.	Pos.	Date of birth (age)	Since	Signed from	Apps	Goals
Goalkeepers
1	Bojan Brać	(Serbia)	GK	28 February 1989 (aged 25)	2013	(Serbia) Hajduk Kula	-	-
12	Cătălin Straton	(Romania)	GK	9 October 1989 (aged 24)	2014	(Romania) Vaslui	-	-
22	Ionuț Irimia	(Romania)	GK	17 May 1979 (aged 35)	2013	(Romania) CSMS Iași	-	-
34	Cristian Bălgrădean	(Romania)	GK	21 March 1988 (aged 26)	2014	(Romania) Dinamo București	-	-
Defenders
2	Sebastian Achim	(Romania)	DF	2 June 1986 (aged 27)	2014	(Romania) Petrolul Ploiești	-	-
3	Stephane Acka	(Ivory Coast)	DF	11 October 1990 (aged 23)	2013	(Romania) FC U Craiova	-	-
4	Cosmin Frăsinescu	(Romania)	DF	10 February 1985 (aged 29)	2014	(Romania) Gaz Metan Mediaș	-	-
5	Bogdan Vătăjelu	(Romania)	DF	24 April 1993 (aged 21)	2014	(Romania) Metalul Reșița	-	-
6	Kay	(Cape Verde)	DF	5 January 1988 (aged 26)	2014	(Portugal) Belenenses	-	-
7	Gabriel Velcovici	(Romania)	DF	2 October 1984 (aged 29)	2013	(Romania) Turnu Severin	-	-
7	Marius Briceag	(Romania)	DF	6 April 1992 (aged 22)	2015	(Romania) Râmnicu Vâlcea	-	-
18	Ovidiu Dănănae	(Romania)	DF	26 August 1985 (aged 28)	2014	(Cyprus) Apollon Limassol	-	-
19	Andrei Dumitraș	(Romania)	DF	23 January 1988 (aged 26)	2015	(Romania) Ceahlăul Piatra Neamț	-	-
23	Andrei Sin	(Romania)	DF	26 October 1991 (aged 22)	2013	(Romania) Delta Tulcea	-	-
23	Vlad Marcu	(Romania)	DF	5 March 1995 (aged 19)	2014	(Romania) FC U Craiova	-	-
26	Adrian Avrămia	(Romania)	DF	31 January 1992 (aged 22)	2013	(Romania) CSMS Iași	-	-
27	Nicușor Bancu	(Romania)	DF	18 September 1992 (aged 21)	2014	(Romania) Olt Slatina	-	-
28	Madson	(Brazil)	DF	9 May 1991 (aged 23)	2014	(Romania) Vaslui	-	-
Midfielders
8	Alexandru Mateiu	(Romania)	MF	10 December 1989 (aged 24)	2014	(Romania) Brașov	-	-
10	Viorel Ferfelea	(Romania)	MF	26 April 1985 (aged 29)	2013	(Romania) Sportul Studențesc	-	-
11	Alexandru Neacșa	(Romania)	MF	3 September 1991 (aged 22)	2013	(Romania) Corona Brașov	-	-
13	Alexandru Băluță	(Romania)	MF	13 September 1993 (aged 20)	2014	(Romania) Viitorul Constanța	-	-
14	Pablo Brandán	(Argentina)	MF	5 March 1983 (aged 31)	2014	(Israel) Beitar Jerusalem	-	-
15	Nuno Rocha	(Cape Verde)	MF	25 March 1992 (aged 22)	2014	(Portugal) Marítimo	-	-
19	Mihăiţă Pleşan (C)	(Romania)	MF	19 February 1983 (aged 31)	2013	(Russia) Volga Nizhny Novgorod	-	-
21	Adrian Cîrstea	(Romania)	MF	27 March 1995 (aged 19)	2013	Academy	-	-
24	Ionuț Tîrnăcop	(Romania)	MF	22 April 1987 (aged 27)	2014	(Romania) Universitatea Cluj	-	-
30	Silviu Izvoranu	(Romania)	MF	3 December 1982 (aged 31)	2013	(Ukraine) Volyn Lutsk	-	-
40	Dacian Varga	(Romania)	MF	15 October 1984 (aged 29)	2013	(Romania) Sportul Studențesc	-	-
Forwards
4	Costin Curelea	(Romania)	FW	11 July 1984 (aged 29)	2013	(Romania) Sportul Studențesc	-	-
11	Tha'er Bawab	(Romania)	FW	1 March 1985 (aged 29)	2014	(Romania) Gaz Metan Mediaș	-	-
16	Andrei Ivan	(Romania)	FW	4 January 1997 (aged 17)	2013	(Romania) Sporting Pitești	-	-
17	Andrei Hergheligiu	(Romania)	FW	21 March 1992 (aged 22)	2014	(Romania) CSMS Iași	-	-
21	Nerijus Valskis	(Lithuania)	FW	4 August 1987 (aged 26)	2013	(Lithuania) Sūduva Marijampolė	-	-

=== Transfers ===
==== In ====
Date	Pos.	Player	Age	Moving from	Fee	Notes	Source

==== Loans in ====
Date	Pos.	Player	Age	Moving from	Fee	Notes	Source

==== Out ====
Date	Pos.	Player	Age	Moving to	Fee	Notes	Source

==== Loans out ====
Date	Pos.	Player	Age	Moving to	Fee	Notes	Source

== Pre-season and friendlies ==
Win Draw Loss

27 June 2014 Friendly	Universitatea Craiova (Romania)	2–2	(North Macedonia) Vardar	Dravograd, Slovenia
17:00	Bancu 3'; Ivan 90'	Report	4'; 36'

1 July 2014 Friendly	Celje (Slovenia)	4–6	(Romania) Universitatea Craiova	Dravograd, Slovenia
17:00	23'; 32'; 85'; 88'	Report	Curelea 4', 26'; Pleșan 67' (pen.); Nuno Rocha 73'; Sin 78'; Herghelegiu 83'

3 July 2014 Friendly	Slaven Belupo (Croatia)	0–1	(Romania) Universitatea Craiova	Dravograd, Slovenia
17:00		Report	Edson 65' (o.g.)

6 July 2014 Friendly	Universitatea Craiova (Romania)	0–0	(Slovenia) Olimpija Ljubljana	Dravograd, Slovenia
17:00		Report

9 July 2014 Friendly	Universitatea Craiova (Romania)	4–1	(Slovenia) Šampion	Dravograd, Slovenia
17:30	Madson 22'; Mateiu 59'; Ivan 82'; Kay 87'	Report	20'

6 September 2014 Friendly	Universitatea Craiova (Romania)	2–1	(Serbia) OFK Beograd	Craiova
17:00	Băluță 23'; Pleșan 80'	Report	Jovanović 50'	Stadium: Ion Oblemenco; Attendance: 2,000

9 September 2014 Friendly	Universitatea Craiova (Romania)	3–2	(Romania) Podari	Craiova
16:00	Izvoranu 12'; Sin 20'; Burlacu 47'	Report	Preda 84'; Segărceanu 85'

11 October 2014 Friendly	Pandurii Târgu Jiu (Romania)	0–3	(Romania) Universitatea Craiova	Turnu Severin
15:00		Report	Ferfelea 36'; Herghelegiu 54', 64'	Stadium: Municipal; Attendance: 500

15 October 2014 Friendly	Universitatea Craiova (Romania)	5–0	(Romania) Vișina Nouă	Craiova
16:00	Sin 2', 16'; Cîrstea 19'; Brandán 39'; Avrămia 71'	Report

18 November 2014 Friendly	Universitatea Craiova (Romania)	11–0	(Romania) Pandurii II Târgu Jiu	Craiova
14:00	Curelea 8', 12'; Tîrnăcop 13'; Acka 27'; Vătăjelu 30', 38'; Ferfelea 34'; Herghelegiu 63'; Velcovici 69'; Ivan 78'; Varga 81'	Report

25 November 2014 Friendly	Universitatea Craiova (Romania)	0–0	(Romania) Podari	Craiova
13:00		Report

17 January 2015 Friendly	Gençlerbirliği (Turkey)	1–1	(Romania) Universitatea Craiova	Belek, Turkey
16:00	Kaya 20'	Report	Herghelegiu 37'

21 January 2015 Friendly	Universitatea Craiova (Romania)	3–0	(Azerbaijan) Khazar Lankaran	Belek, Turkey
16:00	Tîrnăcop 2'; Băluță 59'; Herghelegiu 82'	Report

25 January 2015 Friendly	Anzhi Makhachkala (Russia)	1–0	(Romania) Universitatea Craiova	Belek, Turkey
16:00	Andreyev 60'	Report

31 January 2015 Friendly	Pogoń Szczecin (Poland)	0–0	(Romania) Universitatea Craiova	Belek, Turkey
16:00		Report

1 February 2015 Friendly	Kuban Krasnodar (Russia)	0–0	(Romania) Universitatea Craiova	Belek, Turkey
16:00		Report

4 February 2015 Friendly	Shanghai SIPG (China)	2–2	(Romania) Universitatea Craiova	Belek, Turkey
14:00	Hysén 28'; 86'	Report	Briceag 22'; Brandán 89' (pen.)

6 February 2015 Friendly	Universitatea Craiova (Romania)	2–1	(Poland) Jagiellonia Białystok	Belek, Turkey
16:00	Bawab 21'; Mateiu 73'	Report	Gajos 28' (pen.)

8 February 2015 Friendly	Wisła Kraków (Poland)	1–2	(Romania) Universitatea Craiova	Belek, Turkey
16:30	Guerrier 73'	Report	Brandán 49'; Băluţă 71'

9 February 2015 Friendly	Pakhtakor Tashkent (Uzbekistan)	0–2	(Romania) Universitatea Craiova	Belek, Turkey
16:00		Report	Kay 20'; Ivan 54'

11 February 2015 Friendly	Sheriff Tiraspol (Moldova)	1–2	(Romania) Universitatea Craiova	Belek, Turkey
16:00	Macrițchii 70'	Report	Tîrnăcop 29'; Nuno Rocha 44'

18 February 2015 Friendly	Universitatea Craiova (Romania)	2–1	(Romania) FC Caransebeș	Turnu Severin
14:00	Vătăjelu 39'; Herghelegiu 90'	Report	Stoica 47'	Stadium: Municipal

4 March 2015 Friendly	Olt Slatina (Romania)	1–2	(Romania) Universitatea Craiova	Slatina
13:00	Curtuiuș 58'	Report	Herghelegiu 79'; Băluță 89'	Attendance: 500

28 March 2015 Friendly	Metalul Reșița (Romania)	0–4	(Romania) Universitatea Craiova	Turnu Severin
13:00		Report	Băluță 35'; Herghelegiu 42', 52'; Cîrstea 65'	Stadium: Municipal; Attendance: 200

== Competitions ==
Win Draw Loss

=== Overview ===
Competition	First match	Last match	Starting round	Final position	Record							
Competition	First match	Last match	Starting round	Final position	Pld	W	D	L	GF	GA	GD	Win %
Liga I	25 July 2014	30 May 2015	Matchday 1	5th	34	14	11	9	40	34	+6	41.18
Cupa României	25 September 2014	4 December 2014	Round of 32	Quarter-finals	3	2	0	1	4	3	+1	66.67
Cupa Ligii	16 July 2014	16 July 2014	Play-off	Play-off	1	0	0	1	0	1	−1	0.00
Total					38	16	11	11	44	38	+6	42.11

Last updated: 14 August 2018
Source: Competitions

=== Liga I ===
The Liga I fixture list was announced on 2 July 2014.

Universitatea Craiova started their league campaign against Pandurii Targu Jiu in a thrilling match that ended in a 1–1 draw. The game saw over 15,000 fans flock to the "Ion Oblemenco" stadium to support the home team. Both teams began the game with caution, but Universitatea quickly took charge of the game, with Curelea coming close to scoring in the 13th minute, but his lobbed shot missed the target. The rest of the half saw Universitatea control the game but unable to find the final pass. The second half saw Ferfelea and Curelea creating more chances, and Pleșan's entry at halftime energized the home team's attack. Against the run of play, Pandurii took the lead in the 75th minute, when Shalaj took advantage of a lack of synchronisation in Craiova's defense. Despite Curelea missing several chances, including one that hit the crossbar, he eventually found the back of the net in the 87th minute to level the score at 1-1.

In their next match against Steaua Bucharest, Universitatea Craiova put up a valiant effort but ultimately lost 3–1. The Craiova team played without Mateiu and Pleșan, who were injured, and manager Jerry Gane experimented with Madson and Nuno Rocha in midfield. Despite conceding a goal in the third minute, Universitatea attacked Steaua relentlessly, and Băluță's chance in the second half went begging. Steaua proved too experienced for the young Craiova team, and the game ended 3–1 in favor of the home team.

Universitatea Craiova faced Viitorul Constanta in their next game, which ended 2-2. The visitors took the lead from a penalty, but two Curelea goals before halftime put the home team in front. It was a tight game, and Mitrea's second-half free-kick equalized for Viitorul, with both teams creating chances to win in the closing stages. The point was well-deserved for the Craiova team, who showed their fighting spirit.

==== Liga I table ====
Pos	Team	Pld	W	D	L	GF	GA	GD	Pts	Qualification or relegation
3	CFR Cluj (Note: CFR Cluj were initially deducted 24 points due to financial reasons, but the decision was adjourned by Court of Arbitration for Sport until the conclusion of the insolvency proceedings. CFR Cluj were not eligible to play in Europe as they did not obtain an UEFA license because they filed for insolvency.) (I)	34	16	9	9	46	29	+17	57 (Note: CFR Cluj ahead on head-to-head record; CFR Cluj–Astra Giurgiu 4–1, Astra Giurgiu–CFR Cluj 0–1)	Not granted a license for UEFA Competitions
4	Astra Giurgiu	34	15	12	7	53	27	+26	57	Qualification for the Europa League second qualifying round (Note: The Romanian Cup finalist Universitatea Cluj filed for insolvency, and the other one is Steaua București, so the European spot meant for cup winner will be filled up by the 3rd eligible team from the Liga I and the spot for the third-placed team will be given to the 4th eligible team from the Liga I.)
5	Universitatea Craiova (Note: Teams who have not been given a UEFA license (Brașov, Ceahlăul Piatra Neamț, CFR Cluj, Concordia Chiajna, Universitatea Craiova, Dinamo București, Oțelul Galați, Petrolul Ploiești, Rapid București and Universitatea Cluj) were not eligible to play in European competitions. Petrolul Ploiești, Dinamo București, Rapid București, FC Brașov, Universitatea Cluj and CFR Cluj were not eligible to play in Europe because they filed for insolvency and Universitatea Craiova was not eligible because it was affiliated in 2013.) (I)	34	14	11	9	40	34	+6	53	Not granted a license for UEFA Competitions
6	Petrolul Ploiești (I)	34	14	10	10	42	30	+12	52	Not granted a license for UEFA Competitions
7	Dinamo București (I)	34	13	9	12	47	44	+3	48	Not granted a license for UEFA Competitions

Source: Liga I (in Romanian) UEFA.com (in English)
Rules for classification: 1) points; 2) head-to-head results; 3) goal difference; 4) number of goals scored
(I) Unable to qualify for UEFA Competitions

==== Results summary ====
Overall								Home						Away					
Pld	W	D	L	GF	GA	GD	Pts	W	D	L	GF	GA	GD	W	D	L	GF	GA	GD
34	14	11	9	40	34	+6	53	7	7	3	19	10	+9	7	4	6	21	24	−3

Last updated: 14 August 2018.
Source: Liga I

==== Results by round ====
Round	1	2	3	4	5	6	7	8	9	10	11	12	13	14	15	16	17	18	19	20	21	22	23	24	25	26	27	28	29	30	31	32	33	34
Ground	H	A	H	A	H	A	H	A	H	A	H	A	H	A	H	H	A	A	H	A	H	A	H	A	H	A	H	A	H	A	H	A	A	H
Result	D	L	D	L	L	L	W	W	W	D	D	W	W	W	W	W	D	W	D	D	D	W	D	W	W	L	D	D	L	L	L	W	L	W
Position	7	14	15	13	17	18	16	13	10	10	10	9	9	7	7	4	6	5	5	6	7	5	5	4	4	4	4	4	5	6	6	6	6	5

Source: Liga I
A = Away; H = Home; W = Win; D = Draw; L = Loss

==== Matches ====
Win Draw Loss

25 July 2014 1	Universitatea Craiova	1–1	Pandurii Târgu Jiu	Craiova
20:00 EEST (UTC+3)	Achim (yellow card) 52'; Madson (yellow card) 59'; Kay (yellow card) 66'; Curelea 86'	Report	Anton (yellow card) 41'; Élton (yellow card) 51'; Roman (yellow card) 62'; Shalaj 73'; Nistor (yellow card) 87'	Stadium: Ion Oblemenco; Attendance: 13,000; Referee: Cristian Balaj (Baia Mare)

2 August 2014 2	Steaua București	3–1	Universitatea Craiova	Bucharest
20:00 EEST (UTC+3)	Popa 3'; Sânmărtean 34'; Râpă (yellow card) 45'; Prepeliță (yellow card) 70'; Arlauskis (yellow card) 80'; Varela 90+4'	Report	Bancu (yellow card) 39'; Kay (yellow card) 77'; Băluță (yellow card) 79'; Ivan 90+5'	Stadium: Stadionul Steaua; Attendance: 0 Referee: Adrian Cojocaru (Galaţi)

8 August 2014 3	Universitatea Craiova	2–2	Viitorul Constanța	Craiova
17:30 EEST (UTC+3)	Vătăjelu (yellow card) 10'; Curelea 23', 31'; Acka (yellow card) 78'; Madson (yellow card) 90+1'	Report	Mitrea 20' (pen.), 79'; Nedelcu (yellow card) 43'; Țîru (yellow card) 88'	Stadium: Ion Oblemenco; Attendance: 8,000; Referee: Marius Avram (Bucharest)

15 August 2014 4	Gaz Metan Mediaș	1–0	Universitatea Craiova	Mediaş
17:30 EEST (UTC+3)	Figliomeni 35'; Mujgradic (yellow card) 52'; Todea (yellow card) 76'	Report		Stadium: Gaz Metan; Attendance: 1,000; Referee: George Rădulescu (Bucharest)

24 August 2014 5	Universitatea Craiova	0–2	Petrolul Ploiești	Craiova
20:00 EEST (UTC+3)	Madson (yellow card) 8'; Frăsinescu (yellow card) 11'; Brandán (yellow card) 60'; Brać (yellow card) 67'; Curelea (yellow card) 87'	Report	Albin (yellow card) 61' (goal) 68'; Tamuz 82'	Stadium: Ion Oblemenco; Attendance: 14,000; Referee: Alexandru Tudor (Bucharest)

31 August 2014 6	Astra Giurgiu	5–0	Universitatea Craiova	Giurgiu
18:00 EEST (UTC+3)	Oros (yellow card) 36'; Budescu 45', 59', 84' (pen.); Bukari 52'; Enache 86'	Report	Brandán (yellow card) 42'; Nuno Rocha (yellow card) 45+1'; Kay (yellow card) 83'	Stadium: Marin Anastasovici; Attendance: 7,000; Referee: Cristian Balaj (Baia Mare)

15 September 2014 7	Universitatea Craiova	1–0	Oțelul Galați	Craiova
17:30 EEST (UTC+3)	Kay (red card) 51'; Madson 61'	Report	Miron (yellow card) 4'; Murgoci (yellow card) 29'; Milea (yellow card) 55'; Karlík (yellow card) 64'	Stadium: Ion Oblemenco; Attendance: 2,500; Referee: Dragoş Istrate (Bucharest)

22 September 2014 8	Universitatea Cluj	0–2	Universitatea Craiova	Cluj
20:00 EEST (UTC+3)	Costin (yellow card) 71'; Neag (yellow card) 81'; Nuno Viveiros (yellow card) 90+2'	Report	Mușat 49' (o.g.); Bancu 64'; Brandán (yellow card) 82' (yellow-red card) 90+1'; Nuno Rocha (yellow card) 85'; Madson (yellow card) 89'	Stadium: Cluj Arena; Attendance: 3,000; Referee: Adrian Comănescu (Râmnicu Vâlcea)

28 September 2014 9	Universitatea Craiova	1–0	ASA Târgu Mureș	Craiova
15:00 EEST (UTC+3)	Brandán 26' (pen.) (red card) 86'; Bălgrădean (yellow card) 90'	Report	Feussi (yellow card) 56'; N'Doye (yellow card) 80'; Axente (yellow card) 90+1'	Stadium: Ion Oblemenco; Attendance: 8,000; Referee: Radu Petrescu (Bucharest)

5 October 2014 10	Dinamo București	1–1	Universitatea Craiova	Bucharest
20:10 EEST (UTC+3)	Mansaly (yellow card) 19'; Cordoș (yellow card) 29'; Biliński 52' (pen.)	Report	Băluță (yellow card) 8'; Filip 25' (o.g.); Bawab (yellow card) 36'; Madson (yellow card) 37'	Stadium: Dinamo; Attendance: 11,000; Referee: Cristian Balaj (Baia Mare)

19 October 2014 11	Universitatea Craiova	1–1	Concordia Chiajna	Craiova
15:00 EEST (UTC+3)	Varga (yellow card) 5'; Ferfelea 90+1' (pen.)	Report	Wellington 6' (pen.); Cristea (yellow card) 23'; Brlečić (yellow card) 64'; Stan (yellow card) 68' (yellow-red card) 77'	Stadium: Ion Oblemenco; Attendance: 10,000; Referee: Andrei Chivulete (Bucharest)

24 October 2014 12	Brașov	2–3	Universitatea Craiova	Braşov
20:00 EEST (UTC+3)	Diogo Santos (yellow card) 9'; Țîră (yellow card) 10'; Constantinescu 70' (pen.); Ganea 80'; Leko (yellow card) 90'	Report	Vătăjelu 32'; Bawab 45'; Madson (yellow card) 46'; Bălgrădean (yellow card) 70'; Nuno Rocha (yellow card) 74' (goal) 83'	Stadium: Silviu Ploeșteanu; Attendance: 500; Referee: Paul Unimatan (Zalău)

1 November 2014 13	Universitatea Craiova	2–1	Botoșani	Craiova
17:00 EET (UTC+2)	Băluță 27'; Brandán 72'; Vătăjelu (yellow card) 90+4'	Report	Vașvari 31' (pen.); Tincu (yellow card) 32'; Ngadeu-Ngadjui (yellow card) 45' (yellow-red card) 52'; Homei (yellow card) 69'	Stadium: Ion Oblemenco; Attendance: 4,000; Referee: Alexandru Tudor (Bucharest)

9 November 2014 14	CSMS Iași	1–3	Universitatea Craiova	Iaşi
14:30 EET (UTC+2)	Bőle 82'; Plămadă (yellow card) 85'	Report	Nuno Rocha 3', 33'; Tîrnăcop 78'; Bălgrădean (yellow card) 90'	Stadium: Emil Alexandrescu; Attendance: 3,000; Referee: Lucian Rusandu (Sfântu Gheorghe)

24 November 2014 15	Universitatea Craiova	2–0	Rapid București	Craiova
19:30 EET (UTC+2)	Brandán 42'; Bawab 90+3'	Report	Dică (yellow card) 35'; Iacob (yellow card) 73'; Martin (yellow card) 90+1'	Stadium: Ion Oblemenco; Attendance: 7,000; Referee: Iulian Călin (Ștefănești)

29 November 2014 16	Universitatea Craiova	2–0	Ceahlăul Piatra Neamț	Craiova
14:30 EET (UTC+2)	Bawab 4'; Hergheligiu 59'	Report	Marc (yellow card) 26' (yellow-red card) 87'	Stadium: Ion Oblemenco; Attendance: 3,000; Referee: Cătălin Popa (Piteşti)

7 December 2014 17	CFR Cluj	0–0	Universitatea Craiova	Cluj
19:30 EET (UTC+2)	Chanturia (yellow card) 78'	Report	Izvoranu (yellow card) 68'; Tîrnăcop (yellow card) 85'	Stadium: Dr. Constantin Rădulescu; Attendance: 1,500; Referee: Radu Petrescu (Bucharest)

23 February 2015 18	Pandurii Târgu Jiu	0–1	Universitatea Craiova	Târgu Jiu
19:30 EET (UTC+2)	Brata (yellow card) 29'; Anton (yellow card) 45'; Ungurușan (yellow card) 62'; Nicoară (yellow card) 87'	Report	Tîrnăcop (yellow card) 35'; Vătăjelu (yellow card) 40'; Bawab 57'; Băluță (yellow card) 63'	Stadium: Tudor Vladimirescu; Attendance: 6,000; Referee: Ovidiu Hațegan (Arad)

1 March 2015 19	Universitatea Craiova	0–0	Steaua București	Craiova
14:30 EET (UTC+2)	Brandán (yellow card) 24' (yellow-red card) 50'; Madson (yellow card) 41'	Report	Râpă (yellow card) 26'; Prepeliță (yellow card) 42'; Popa (yellow card) 81'	Stadium: Extensiv; Attendance: 6,000; Referee: Marius Avram (Bucharest)

8 March 2015 20	Viitorul Constanța	1–1	Universitatea Craiova	Chiajna
17:00 EET (UTC+2)	Mitriță 1'	Report	Nuno Rocha 24'; Madson (yellow card) 36'; Băluță (yellow card) 45'; Vătăjelu (yellow card) 63'	Stadium: Concordia; Attendance: 800; Referee: George Rădulescu (Bucharest)

14 March 2015 21	Universitatea Craiova	1–1	Gaz Metan Mediaș	Craiova
14:30 EET (UTC+2)	Tîrnăcop 16'; Achim (yellow card) 58'; Mateiu (yellow card) 79'	Report	Abrudan (yellow card) 9'; Élton (yellow card) 34'; Velázquez (yellow card) 52'; Llullaku 65'	Stadium: Extensiv; Attendance: 3,500; Referee: Dragoş Istrate (Bucharest)

17 March 2015 22	Petrolul Ploiești	1–2	Universitatea Craiova	Ploieşti
18:30 EET (UTC+2)	Filip (yellow card) 19'; Astafei 49'; Ipša (yellow card) 51'; Alcénat (yellow card) 58'	Report	Nuno Rocha 6' (yellow card) 45+1'; Mateiu (yellow card) 41'; Brandán 51' (pen.); Achim (yellow card) 83'; Tîrnăcop (yellow card) 90+4'	Stadium: Ilie Oană; Attendance: 7,000; Referee: Cristian Balaj (Baia Mare)

21 March 2015 23	Universitatea Craiova	0–0	Astra Giurgiu	Craiova
14:30 EET (UTC+2)	Madson (yellow card) 54'; Kay (yellow card) 79'	Report	Yahaya (yellow card) 62'; Seto (yellow card) 69'; Lung (yellow card) 87'	Stadium: Extensiv; Attendance: 4,000; Referee: Ovidiu Hațegan (Arad)

4 April 2015 24	Oțelul Galați	0–1	Universitatea Craiova	Galaţi
14:30 EEST (UTC+3)	Hamroun (yellow card) 11'; Solomou (yellow card) 23'; Cucu (yellow card) 64'; Hotoboc (yellow card) 66'	Report	Mateiu (yellow card) 56'; Bawab 57' (yellow card) 58'; Tîrnăcop (yellow card) 66'	Stadium: Oţelul; Attendance: 1,500; Referee: Marius Avram (Bucharest)

7 April 2015 25	Universitatea Craiova	3–0	Universitatea Cluj	Craiova
16:00 EEST (UTC+3)	Bawab 23'; Nuno Rocha 41', 71'; Vătăjelu (yellow card) 68'	Report	Ceppelini (red card) 9'; Škvorc (yellow card) 60'; Nuno Viveiros (yellow card) 67'; Neag (yellow card) 89'	Stadium: Extensiv; Attendance: 3,500; Referee: Robert Dumitru (Sfântu Gheorghe)

11 April 2015 26	ASA Târgu Mureș	2–1	Universitatea Craiova	Târgu Mureş
15:30 EEST (UTC+3)	Bejan (yellow card) 29'; Gorobsov (yellow card) 38'; Zicu 45+1'; N'Doye 67'	Report	Achim (yellow card) 40'; Madson (yellow card) 66'; Hergheligiu 90+1'; Brandán (yellow card) 90+6'	Stadium: Trans-Sil; Attendance: 6,000; Referee: Ovidiu Hațegan (Arad)

19 April 2015 27	Universitatea Craiova	0–0	Dinamo București	Craiova
16:30 EEST (UTC+3)	Brandán (yellow card) 41'; Izvoranu (yellow card) 59'	Report	Filip (yellow card) 36' (yellow-red card) 76'; Grigore (yellow card) 41'	Stadium: Extensiv; Attendance: 6,000; Referee: Cristian Balaj (Baia Mare)

24 April 2015 28	Concordia Chiajna	2–2	Universitatea Craiova	Chiajna
16:00 EEST (UTC+3)	Alves (yellow card) 32'; Maftei 37'; Boldrin (yellow card) 72'; Dina 80'	Report	Vătăjelu (yellow card) 32'; Frăsinescu (yellow card) 36'; Tîrnăcop 41'; Bawab 56'; Bălgrădean (yellow card) 81'	Stadium: Concordia; Attendance: 2,000; Referee: Adrian Cojocaru (Galaţi)

29 April 2015 29	Universitatea Craiova	0–1	Brașov	Craiova
16:00 EEST (UTC+3)	Bawab (yellow card) 42'	Report	Matei (red card) 35'; Goian (yellow card) 76'; Bencun 80'; Străuț (yellow card) 81'	Stadium: Extensiv; Attendance: 1,500; Referee: Cătălin Popa (Piteşti)

2 May 2015 30	Botoșani	2–0	Universitatea Craiova	Botoşani
20:00 EEST (UTC+3)	Acsinte 25'; Vașvari (yellow card) 58'; Batin 86'	Report	Madson (yellow card) 30'; Băluță (yellow card) 40'	Stadium: Municipal; Attendance: 5,000; Referee: Iulian Călin (Ștefănești)

9 May 2015 31	Universitatea Craiova	0–1	CSMS Iași	Craiova
16:00 EEST (UTC+3)		Report	Ciucă (yellow card) 53'; Bădic (yellow card) 60'; Mitić (yellow card) 72'; Crețu 77'; Grahovac (yellow card) 90+5'	Stadium: Extensiv; Attendance: 2,000; Referee: Alexandru Tudor (Bucharest)

17 May 2015 32	Rapid București	1–2	Universitatea Craiova	Bucharest
20:00 EEST (UTC+3)	Niculae 23'; Sapina (yellow card) 65'; Josl (yellow card) 78'	Report	Bawab (yellow card) 59'; Mateiu 72'; Nuno Rocha 74'; Frăsinescu (yellow card) 84'	Stadium: Giulești-Valentin Stănescu; Attendance: 8,000; Referee: István Kovács (Carei)

24 May 2015 33	Ceahlăul Piatra Neamț	2–1	Universitatea Craiova	Piatra Neamţ
15:00 EEST (UTC+3)	Căruță (yellow card) 26'; Sialmas 69'; Achim (yellow card) 90'; Buden 90'	Report	Hergheligiu 37'	Stadium: Ceahlăul; Attendance: 1,000; Referee: Andrei Chivulete (Bucharest)

30 May 2015 34	Universitatea Craiova	3–0	CFR Cluj	Craiova
17:00 EEST (UTC+3)	Bawab 49', 82'; Nuno Rocha (yellow card) 62'; Băluță 65'; Mateiu (yellow card) 67'	Report	Larie (yellow card) 21'; Lopes (yellow card) 31'; Vereș (yellow card) 35'; Carp (yellow card) 69'; Petrucci (yellow card) 80'	Stadium: Extensiv; Attendance: 1,000; Referee: Cătălin Popa (Piteşti)

=== Cupa României ===
Universitatea Craiova entered the Romanian Cup at the Round of 32.

Their first opponents were second division side FC Caransebeș. Playing with several second string players, Craiova started the game brightly and missed two early chances. Ferfelea's free-kick almost hit the target and Herghelegiu was unable to tap in the ball from inside the six-yard box. In the 25th minute Ferfelea's cross-shot was deflected in the goal by Caransebeș defender Goşa, and Craiova opened the score. After the goal, Craiova's players relaxed and Lupu equalized after a hesitation from the central defenders. The Students were unfazed by the goal and continued to attack, but they were unable to find the net. The numerical equilibrium was broken after Lupu was sent off in the 67th minute. Soon after, Ferfelea received a pass in the middle of the penalty area and scored the winning goal.

In the Round of 16 Universitatea was drawn to play at home against Viitorul Constanța. Craiova created a few early chances through Băluță and Ferfelea, but they were unable to score. Viitorul replied through ex-Craiova player Neacșa, who escaped in a one on one situation with the goalkeeper, but his weak shot was unable to threaten the goal and the first half ended scoreless. Craiova started the second half on the offensive, and their efforts were rewarded when a Curelea volley was boxed by Viitorul's goalkeeper to Băluță, who scored from close range. Despite playing in 10 men after the sending off of Puțanu, Viitorul equalized in stoppage time after a corner and sent the game into extra-time. In the 97th minute, Craiova winger Bancu suffered a double leg fracture that sidelined him for most of the remaining of the season. Mateiu scored the winning goal in the 112th minute and sent Craiova through to the quarter-finals.

25 September 2014	FC Caransebeș	1–2	Universitatea Craiova	Caransebeș
15:00 EEST (UTC+3)	Lupu 25'	Report	Goşa 20' (o.g.); Băluță (yellow card) 63'; Ferfelea 71'	Stadium: Municipal; Attendance: 2,100; Referee: Marian Balaci (Drobeta-Turnu Severin)

29 October 2014	Universitatea Craiova	2–1 (a.e.t.)	Viitorul Constanța	Craiova
17:00 EEST (UTC+3)	Băluță 54'; Brandán (yellow card) 72'; Mateiu 112'; Curelea (yellow card) 120+11'	Report	Pană (yellow card) 29'; Puțanu (yellow card) 32' (yellow-red card) 80'; Șeroni (yellow card) 76' (red card) 97'; Țîru 90+2'; Nikolov (yellow card) 93'	Stadium: Ion Oblemenco; Attendance: 3,500; Referee: Florin Miron (Bucharest)

4 December 2014	Universitatea Craiova	0–1	Steaua București	Craiova
19:00 EET (UTC+2)		Report	Breeveld (yellow card) 30'; Rusescu 69' (pen.); Cojocaru (yellow card) 84'; Latovlevici (yellow card) 90+2'	Stadium: Ion Oblemenco; Attendance: 25,000; Referee: Alexandru Tudor (Bucharest)

=== Cupa Ligii ===
Universitatea Craiova entered the League Cup at the Play-off round.

16 July 2014	Rapid București	1–0	Universitatea Craiova	Bucharest
17:00	Săndulescu (yellow card) 35'; Ciolacu 52'; Păun (yellow card) 54'	Report	Mateiu (yellow card) 29'; Dănănae (yellow card) 58' (yellow-red card) 90+2'; Frăsinescu (yellow card) 60'; Kay (yellow card) 84'; Madson (yellow card) 86'	Stadium: Giulești-Valentin Stănescu; Attendance: 6,000; Referee: George Rădulescu (Bucharest)

== Statistics ==
=== Appearances and goals ===
As of 8 August 2018

No	Pos	Player	Liga I		Cupa României		Cupa Ligii		Total	
No	Pos	Player	Apps	Goals	Apps	Goals	Apps	Goals	Apps	Goals
Goalkeepers
12	GK	(Romania) Cătălin Straton	2 + 0	-	1 + 0	-	-	-	3 + 0	-
22	GK	(Romania) Ionuț Irimia	1 + 0	-	-	-	-	-	1 + 0	-
34	GK	(Romania) Cristian Bălgrădean	27 + 0	-	2 + 0	-	-	-	29 + 0	-
Defenders
2	DF	(Romania) Sebastian Achim	26 + 0	-	1 + 0	-	-	-	27 + 0	-
3	DF	(Ivory Coast) Stephane Acka	26 + 1	-	2 + 0	-	-	-	28 + 1	-
4	DF	(Romania) Cosmin Frăsinescu	27 + 1	-	3 + 0	-	1 + 0	-	31 + 1	-
5	DF	(Romania) Bogdan Vătăjelu	33 + 0	1	2 + 0	-	1 + 0	-	36 + 0	1
6	DF	(Cape Verde) Kay	10 + 5	-	-	-	1 + 0	-	11 + 5	-
7	DF	(Romania) Gabriel Velcovici	0 + 3	-	1 + 0	-	-	-	1 + 3	-
7	DF	(Romania) Marius Briceag	2 + 6	-	-	-	-	-	2 + 6	-
18	DF	(Romania) Ovidiu Dănănae	1 + 0	-	1 + 0	-	1 + 0	-	3 + 0	-
19	DF	(Romania) Andrei Dumitraș	4 + 4	-	-	-	-	-	4 + 4	-
23	DF	(Romania) Andrei Sin	-	-	0 + 1	-	-	-	0 + 1	-
26	DF	(Romania) Adrian Avrămia	0 + 1	-	0 + 1	-	-	-	0 + 2	-
27	DF	(Romania) Nicușor Bancu	11 + 2	1	1 + 1	-	1 + 0	-	13 + 3	1
28	DF	(Brazil) Madson	26 + 1	1	2 + 0	-	1 + 0	-	29 + 1	1
Midfielders
8	MF	(Romania) Alexandru Mateiu	18 + 4	1	2 + 0	1	1 + 0	-	21 + 4	2
10	MF	(Romania) Viorel Ferfelea	6 + 6	1	3 + 0	1	-	-	9 + 6	2
11	MF	(Romania) Alexandru Neacșa	1 + 2	-	-	-	0 + 1	-	1 + 3	-
13	MF	(Romania) Alexandru Băluță	25 + 5	2	3 + 0	1	1 + 0	-	29 + 5	3
14	MF	(Argentina) Pablo Brandán	20 + 2	4	2 + 0	-	-	-	22 + 2	4
15	MF	(Cape Verde) Nuno Rocha	27 + 3	8	0 + 1	-	-	-	27 + 4	8
19	MF	(Romania) Mihăiţă Pleşan (C)	1 + 8	-	0 + 1	-	-	-	1 + 9	-
21	MF	(Romania) Adrian Cîrstea	1 + 6	-	0 + 2	-	-	-	1 + 8	-
24	MF	(Romania) Ionuț Tîrnăcop	23 + 2	3	1 + 0	-	-	-	24 + 2	3
30	MF	(Romania) Silviu Izvoranu	7 + 2	-	1 + 0	-	-	-	8 + 2	-
40	MF	(Romania) Dacian Varga	1 + 3	-	1 + 0	-	-	-	2 + 3	-
Forwards
4	FW	(Romania) Costin Curelea	10 + 5	3	1 + 0	-	1 + 0	-	12 + 5	3
11	FW	(Jordan) Tha'er Bawab	25 + 0	9	1 + 1	-	-	-	26 + 1	9
16	FW	(Romania) Andrei Ivan	3 + 14	1	1 + 0	-	1 + 0	-	5 + 14	1
17	FW	(Romania) Andrei Hergheligiu	6 + 14	3	1 + 1	-	0 + 1	-	7 + 16	3
21	FW	(Lithuania) Nerijus Valskis	0 + 1	-	-	-	-	-	0 + 1	-

=== Squad statistics ===
	Liga I	Cupa României	Cupa Ligii	Home	Away	Total Stats
Games played	34	3	1	19	19	38
Games won	14	2	0	8	8	16
Games drawn	11	0	0	7	4	11
Games lost	9	1	1	4	7	11
Goals scored	40	4	0	21	23	44
Goals conceded	34	3	1	12	26	38
Goal difference	+6	+1	-1	+9	-3	+6
Clean sheets	13	0	0	9	4	13
Goal by Substitute	3	0	0	1	2	3
Total shots	339	22	8	210	159	369
Shots on target	121	10	4	68	67	135
Corners	177	11	6	116	78	194
Players used	32	26	13	29	29	33
Offsides	91	2	1	41	53	94
Fouls suffered	537	22	17	285	291	576
Fouls committed	484	19	16	255	264	519
Yellow cards	67	2	5	28	46	74
Red cards	4	0	1	3	2	5
Average possession	48.97%	21.0%	60.0%	50.0%	44.11%	47.05%
Winning rate	41.18%	66.67%	0.0%	42.11%	42.11%	42.11%

Last updated: 20 August 2018
Source: Competitive matches

=== Goalscorers ===
As of 20 August 2018

Rank	Position	Name	Liga I	Cupa României	Cupa Ligii	Total
1	FW	(Jordan) Tha'er Bawab	9	-	-	9
2	MF	(Cape Verde) Nuno Rocha	8	-	-	8
3	MF	(Argentina) Pablo Brandán	4	-	-	4
4	MF	(Romania) Ionuț Tîrnăcop	3	-	-	3
4	MF	(Romania) Alexandru Băluță	2	1	-	3
4	FW	(Romania) Costin Curelea	3	-	-	3
4	FW	(Romania) Andrei Hergheligiu	3	-	-	3
8	MF	(Romania) Alexandru Mateiu	1	1	-	2
8	MF	(Romania) Viorel Ferfelea	1	1	-	2
10	FW	(Romania) Andrei Ivan	1	-	-	1
10	DF	(Romania) Nicușor Bancu	1	-	-	1
10	DF	(Romania) Bogdan Vătăjelu	1	-	-	1
10	DF	(Brazil) Madson	1	-	-	1
Total			38	3	0	41

Last updated: 20 August 2018
Source: Competitive matches

=== Goal minutes ===
As of 14 August 2018

	1'–15'	16'–30'	31'–HT	46'–60'	61'–75'	76'–FT	Extra time	Forfeit
Goals	3	8	8	8	8	8	1	0
Percentage	6.82%	18.18%	18.18%	18.18%	18.18%	18.18%	2.27%	0%

Source: Competitive matches

=== Clean sheets ===
As of 20 August 2018

Rank	Name	Liga I	Cupa României	Cupa Ligii	Total	Games played
1	(Romania) Cristian Bălgrădean	13	-	-	13	29
2	(Serbia) Bojan Brać	-	-	-	0	5
2	(Romania) Ionuț Irimia	-	-	-	0	1
2	(Romania) Cătălin Straton	-	-	-	0	3
Total		13	0	0	13	38

Last updated: 20 August 2018
Source: Competitive matches

=== Disciplinary record ===
As of 20 August 2018

N	P	Nat.	Name	Liga I			Cupa României			Cupa Ligii			Total			Notes
N	P	Nat.	Name	Yellow card	Second yellow card	Red card	Yellow card	Second yellow card	Red card	Yellow card	Second yellow card	Red card	Yellow card	Second yellow card	Red card	Notes
28	DF	(Brazil)	Madson	11	-	-	-	-	-	1	-	-	12	-	-	
14	MF	(Argentina)	Pablo Brandán	6	2	1	1	-	-	-	-	-	7	2	1	
6	DF	(Cape Verde)	Kay	4	-	1	-	-	-	1	-	-	5	-	1	
5	DF	(Romania)	Bogdan Vătăjelu	6	-	-	-	-	-	-	-	-	6	-	-	
13	MF	(Romania)	Alexandru Băluță	5	-	-	1	-	-	-	-	-	6	-	-	
8	MF	(Romania)	Alexandru Mateiu	4	-	-	-	-	-	1	-	-	5	-	-	
15	MF	(Cape Verde)	Nuno Rocha	5	-	-	-	-	-	-	-	-	5	-	-	
34	GK	(Romania)	Cristian Bălgrădean	4	-	-	-	-	-	-	-	-	4	-	-	
4	DF	(Romania)	Cosmin Frăsinescu	3	-	-	-	-	-	1	-	-	4	-	-	
11	FW	(Jordan)	Tha'er Bawab	4	-	-	-	-	-	-	-	-	4	-	-	
24	MF	(Romania)	Ionuț Tîrnăcop	4	-	-	-	-	-	-	-	-	4	-	-	
2	DF	(Romania)	Sebastian Achim	4	-	-	-	-	-	-	-	-	4	-	-	
18	DF	(Romania)	Ovidiu Dănănae	-	-	-	-	-	-	1	1	-	1	1	-	
30	MF	(Romania)	Silviu Izvoranu	2	-	-	-	-	-	-	-	-	2	-	-	
4	FW	(Romania)	Costin Curelea	1	-	-	1	-	-	-	-	-	2	-	-	
27	DF	(Romania)	Nicușor Bancu	1	-	-	-	-	-	-	-	-	1	-	-	
40	MF	(Romania)	Dacian Varga	1	-	-	-	-	-	-	-	-	1	-	-	
1	GK	(Serbia)	Bojan Brać	1	-	-	-	-	-	-	-	-	1	-	-	
3	DF	(Ivory Coast)	Stephane Acka	1	-	-	-	-	-	-	-	-	1	-	-	
Total				67	2	2	3	0	0	5	1	0	75	3	2	

Last updated: 20 August 2018
Source: Competitive matches

=== Attendances ===
As of 14 August 2018

	Matches	Attendances	Average	High	Low
Liga I	17	97,000	5,705	14,000	1,000
Cupa României	2	28,500	14,250	25,000	3,500
Cupa Ligii	0	0	0	0	0
Total	19	125,500	6,605	25,000	1,000

Last updated: 20 August 2018
Source: Competitive matches

== See also ==
- 2014–15 Liga I
- 2014–15 Cupa României
- 2014–15 Cupa Ligii
