= Andrei Ivan =

Romanian footballer (born 1997)

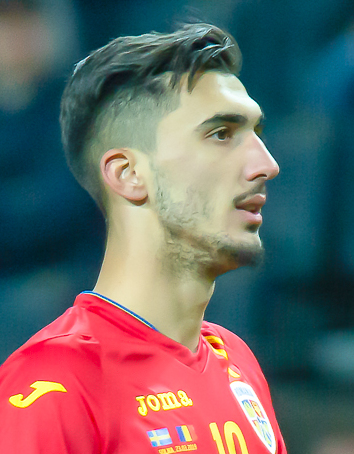
- Ivan with Romania in 2019

Personal information
- Full name: Andrei Virgil Ivan
- Date of birth: 4 January 1997 (age 29)
- Place of birth: Moreni, Romania
- Height: 1.89 m (6 ft 2 in)
- Position: Forward

Team information
- Current team: Dong Nai City
- Number: 9

Youth career
- 2003–2011: Flacăra Moreni
- 2011–2013: Sporting Pitești
- 2013–2014: Universitatea Craiova

Senior career*
| Years | Team | Apps | (Gls) |
| 2014–2017 | Universitatea Craiova | 91 | (18) |
| 2017–2019 | Krasnodar | 7 | (0) |
| 2019 | Krasnodar-2 | 1 | (0) |
| 2018–2019 | → Rapid Wien (loan) | 24 | (1) |
| 2019–2025 | Universitatea Craiova | 180 | (46) |
| 2025 | → Adanaspor (loan) | 15 | (1) |
| 2025–2026 | Panserraikos | 31 | (4) |
| 2026– | Dong Nai City | 5 | (0) |

International career^{‡}
| 2013 | Romania U16 | 2 | (0) |
| 2013–2014 | Romania U17 | 6 | (2) |
| 2014 | Romania U19 | 5 | (0) |
| 2014–2019 | Romania U21 | 10 | (1) |
| 2015–2022 | Romania | 17 | (1) |
- * Club domestic league appearances and goals as of 31 October 2026 ‡ National team caps and goals as of 7 June 2022

Andrei Virgil Ivan (Romanian pronunciation: [anˈdrej virˈd͡ʒil iˈvan]; born 4 January 1997) is a Romanian professional footballer who plays as a forward for V.League 1 club Dong Nai City.

Ivan started out as a senior at Universitatea Craiova in 2014, and three and a half years later earned a €4 million transfer abroad to Russian Premier League side Krasnodar. He did not impose himself in Russia and was loaned for one season to Rapid Wien, before returning to Universitatea Craiova in the summer of 2019.

Ivan registered his senior debut for the Romania national team in November 2015, in a 1–1 friendly draw with Italy.

== Club career ==
=== Early career and Universitatea Craiova ===
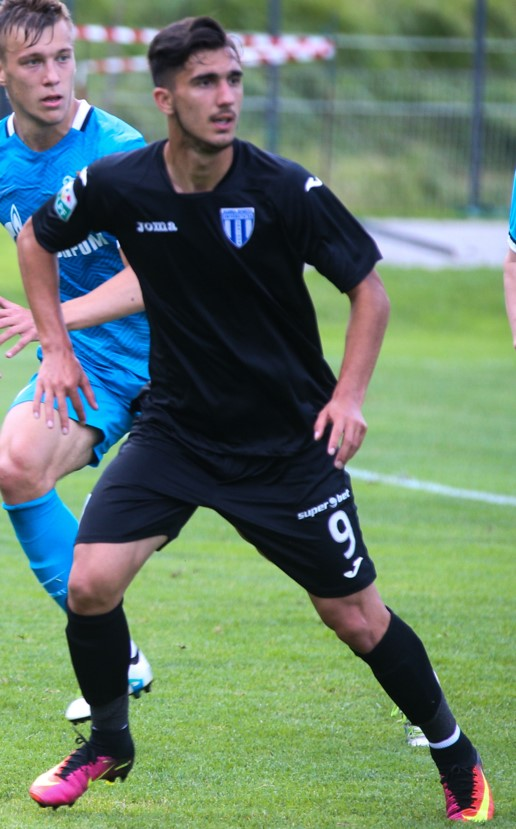
Ivan with Universitatea Craiova during a friendly match against Zenit Saint Petersburg in 2016

Ivan began playing youth football at local Flacăra Moreni, before moving in 2011 to Sporting Pitești. On 30 December 2013, he joined Universitatea Craiova on a two-and-a-half-year deal for an undisclosed fee. Ivan scored his first goal for the club on 28 May 2014, in a 2–0 home victory over ASA Târgu Mureș counting for the Liga II championship. He made eight appearances during the season, as Craiova achieved promotion by winning its series.

On 2 August 2014, he netted his first Liga I goal by coming on as an 82nd-minute substitute in a 1–3 away loss to defending champions Steaua București. In January 2016, Ivan rejected a move to the latter club, which had reached an agreement with Craiova for a transfer worth €2.15 million. Several foreign teams were also interested in acquiring him and Ivan revealed his dream of playing abroad.

At the start of 2017, Ivan gained team captaincy following the departure of Bogdan Vătăjelu to Sparta Prague.

=== Krasnodar ===
On 17 July 2017, Ivan penned a five-year contract with Russian side FC Krasnodar for a rumoured transfer fee of €4 million and 25% interest. He recorded his competitive debut on 20 August, after entering as an 84th-minute substitute for Viktor Claesson in a goalless Russian Premier League draw with Rostov.

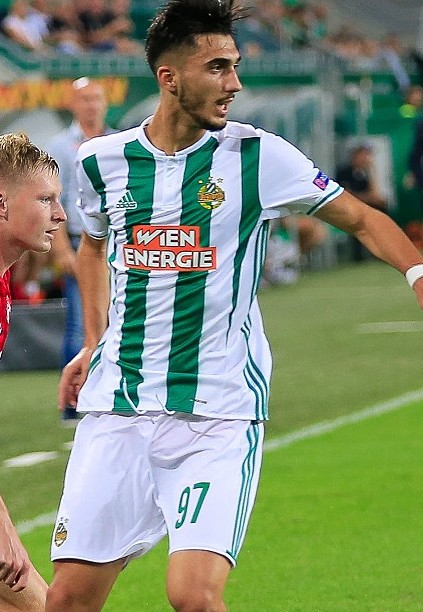
Ivan playing for Rapid Wien in 2018

On 24 June 2018, Ivan joined Austrian Bundesliga club Rapid Wien on a year-long with a purchase option. He totalled 40 appearances in all competitions throughout the season, of which eleven in the UEFA Europa League, and scored three goals. Upon his return to Krasnodar, he played one game for the reserves in the Russian National League, the second level of the Russian league system.

=== Return to Universitatea Craiova ===
Universitatea Craiova announced the re-signing of Ivan on a four-year deal on 28 August 2019. According to press, the Alb-albaștrii paid a €1.5 million transfer fee to bring him back to Oltenia.

On 23 May 2021, Ivan claimed his first major honour after opening the scoring in a 3–2 victory over Astra Giurgiu in the Cupa României final. On 10 July that year, he started in the 4–2 penalty shoot-out win over CFR Cluj in the subsequent Supercupa României.

Amid reports linking him to Galatasaray, Ivan scored all but one of his side's goals in a 5–2 defeat of Mioveni on 30 October 2021. He finished the 2021–22 season with a career-best 14 goals in 33 league matches, and was also the top assist provider (eleven). He repeated the former performance in the following campaign, netting another 14 goals.

=== Dong Nai City ===
In July 2026, Ivan moved to Vietnam, signing for newly promoted V.League 1 club Dong Nai City.

== International career ==
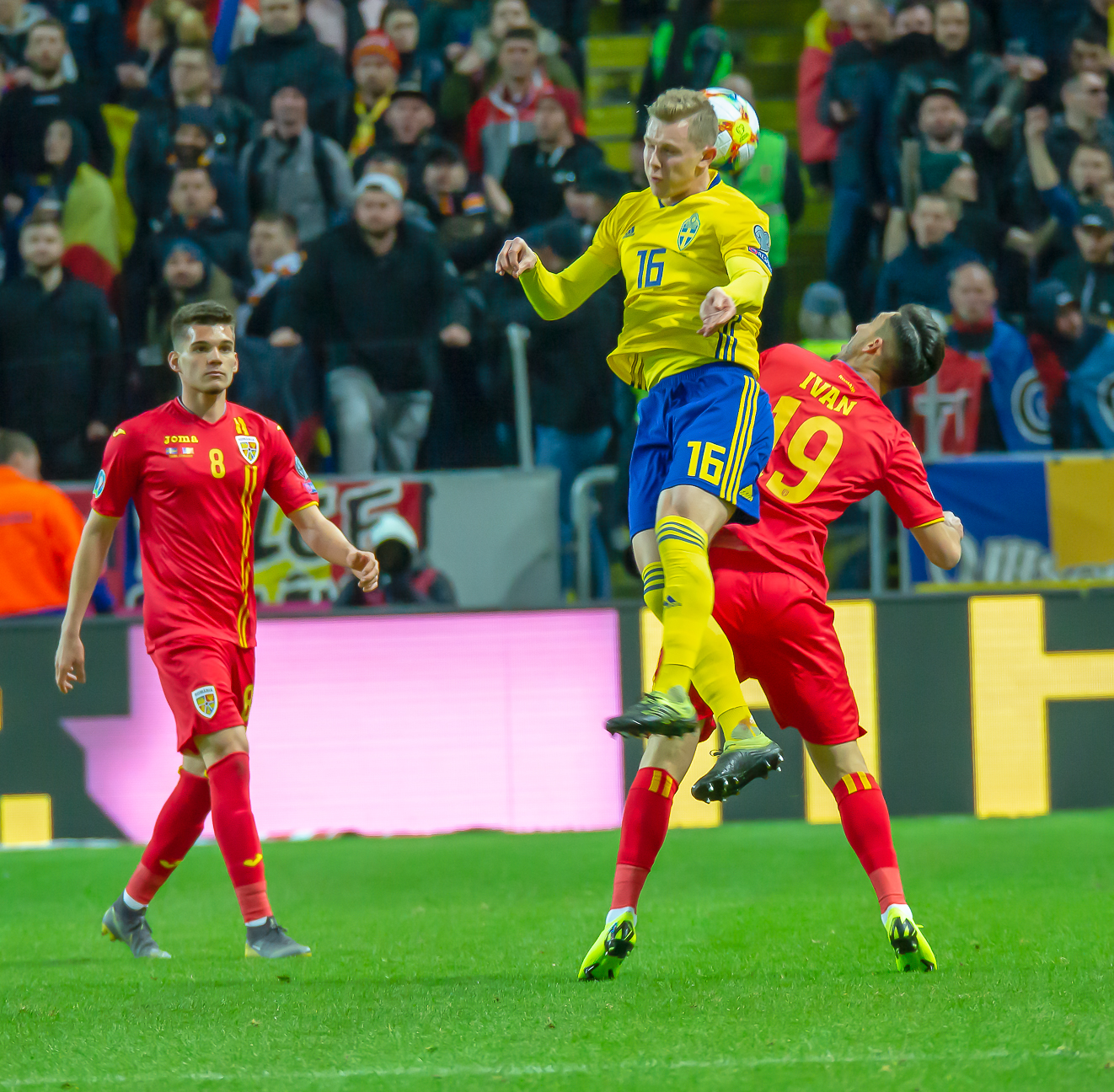
Ivan (No. 19) during a UEFA Euro 2020 qualifying match against Sweden in 2019.

Ivan made his full international debut for Romania on 17 November 2015, aged 18, coming on as a substitute in a 2–2 friendly draw with Italy at the Stadio Renato Dall'Ara in Bologna. He scored his first goal for the nation six years later, in a 1–2 loss to Georgia in Ploiești on 2 June 2021.

== Style of play ==
Ivan is a versatile forward who can be deployed as a winger, by preference on the left flank, or as a striker in the centre.

== Career statistics ==
=== Club ===
As of match played 31 October 2026

Appearances and goals by club, season and competition
| Club | Season | League | | | National cup (Note: Includes Cupa României, Russian Cup, Austrian Cup, Greek Cup) | | League cup (Note: Includes Cupa Ligii) | | Continental | | Other | | Total | |
| Club | Season | Division | Goals | Apps | Goals | Apps | Goals | Apps | Goals | Apps | Goals | Apps | Goals | Apps |
|---|---|---|---|---|---|---|---|---|---|---|---|---|---|---|
| Universitatea Craiova | 2013–14 | Liga II | 8 | 1 | — | | — | | — | | — | | 8 | 1 |
| Universitatea Craiova | 2014–15 | Liga I | 17 | 1 | 1 | 0 | 1 | 0 | — | | — | | 19 | 1 |
| Universitatea Craiova | 2015–16 | Liga I | 32 | 7 | 1 | 0 | 1 | 0 | — | | — | | 34 | 7 |
| Universitatea Craiova | 2016–17 | Liga I | 33 | 9 | 5 | 1 | 0 | 0 | — | | — | | 38 | 10 |
| Universitatea Craiova | 2017–18 | Liga I | 1 | 0 | 0 | 0 | — | | 0 | 0 | — | | 1 | 0 |
| Universitatea Craiova | Total | | 91 | 18 | 7 | 1 | 2 | 0 | 0 | 0 | — | | 100 | 19 |
| Krasnodar | 2017–18 | Russian Premier League | 7 | 0 | 1 | 0 | — | | 1 (Note: Appearance(s) in UEFA Europa League) | 0 | — | | 9 | 0 |
| Rapid Wien (loan) | 2018–19 | Austrian Bundesliga | 24 | 1 | 5 | 2 | — | | 11 | 0 | — | | 40 | 3 |
| Krasnodar-2 | 2019–20 | Russian National League | 1 | 0 | 0 | 0 | — | | — | | — | | 1 | 0 |
| Universitatea Craiova | 2019–20 | Liga I | 24 | 2 | 0 | 0 | — | | — | | — | | 24 | 2 |
| Universitatea Craiova | 2020–21 | Liga I | 34 | 8 | 3 | 1 | — | | 1 | 0 | — | | 38 | 9 |
| Universitatea Craiova | 2021–22 | Liga I | 33 | 14 | 4 | 2 | — | | 1 (Note: Appearance(s) in UEFA Conference League) | 0 | 2 (Note: One appearance in Supercupa României, one appearance in Liga I European play-offs and one goal) | 1 | 40 | 17 |
| Universitatea Craiova | 2022–23 | Liga I | 35 | 14 | 2 | 1 | — | | 6 | 2 | — | | 43 | 17 |
| Universitatea Craiova | 2023–24 | Liga I | 36 | 7 | 2 | 0 | — | | — | | 1 (Note: Appearance in Liga I European play-offs) | 0 | 39 | 7 |
| Universitatea Craiova | 2024–25 | Liga I | 16 | 0 | 3 | 0 | — | | 2 | 0 | — | | 21 | 0 |
| Universitatea Craiova | 2025–26 | Liga I | 2 | 1 | 0 | 0 | — | | 0 | 0 | — | | 2 | 1 |
| Universitatea Craiova | Total | | 180 | 46 | 14 | 4 | — | | 10 | 2 | 3 | 1 | 207 | 53 |
| Adanaspor (loan) | 2024–25 | TFF 1. Lig | 15 | 1 | — | | — | | — | | — | | 15 | 1 |
| Panserraikos | 2025–26 | Super League Greece | 31 | 4 | 1 | 1 | — | | — | | — | | 32 | 5 |
| Dong Nai City | 2026–27 | V.League 1 | 5 | 0 | 0 | 0 | — | | — | | — | | 5 | 0 |
| Career total | | | 354 | 70 | 28 | 8 | 2 | 0 | 22 | 2 | 3 | 1 | 409 | 81 |

=== International ===
As of match played 7 June 2022

Appearances and goals by national team and year
| National team | Year | Apps | Goals |
|---|---|---|---|
Romania
| Romania | 2015 | 1 | 0 |
| Romania | 2016 | 2 | 0 |
| Romania | 2017 | 3 | 0 |
| Romania | 2018 | 0 | 0 |
| Romania | 2019 | 1 | 0 |
| Romania | 2020 | 0 | 0 |
| Romania | 2021 | 6 | 1 |
| Romania | 2022 | 4 | 0 |
| Total | | 17 | 1 |

Scores and results list Romania's goal tally first, score column indicates score after each Ivan goal.

List of international goals scored by Andrei Ivan
| No. | Date | Venue | Cap | Opponent | Score | Result | Competition |
|---|---|---|---|---|---|---|---|
| 1 | 2 June 2021 | Ilie Oană Stadium, Ploiești, Romania | 9 | Georgia | 1–2 | 1–2 | Friendly |

== Honours ==
Universitatea Craiova

- Liga II: 2013–14
- Cupa României: 2020–21
- Supercupa României: 2021

Rapid Wien

- Austrian Cup runner-up: 2018–19

Individual

- Liga I Team of the Season: 2016–17, 2021–22
- Liga I Top Assist Provider: 2021–22
- Gazeta Sporturilor Romania Player of the Month: October 2021
