= Costin Curelea =

Romanian footballer

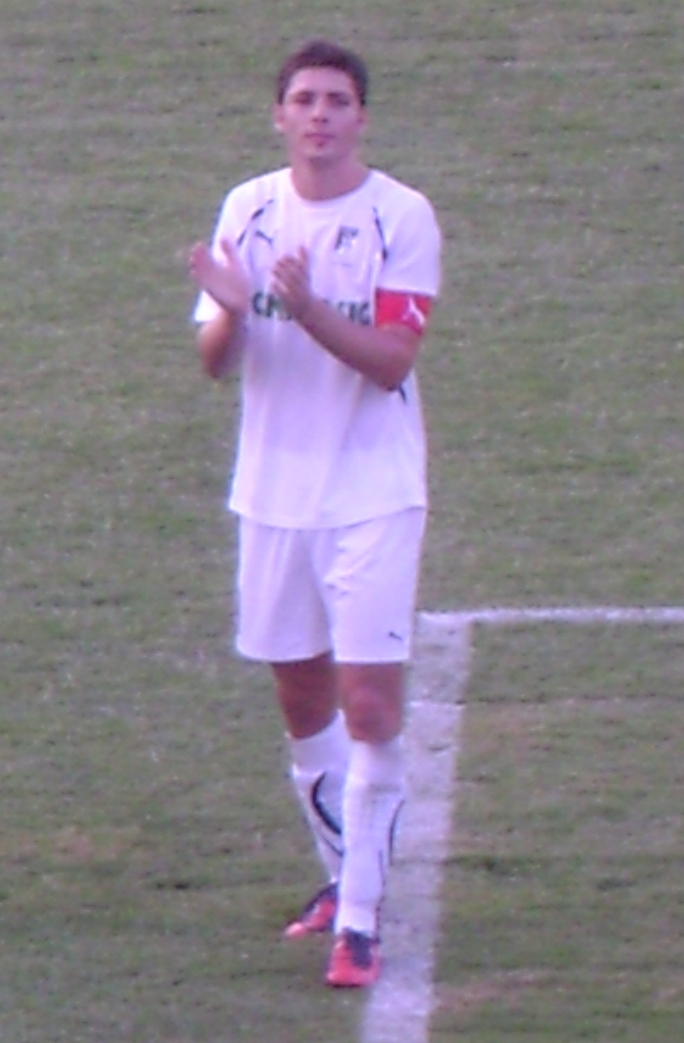

Personal information
- Full name: Costin Romeo Curelea
- Date of birth: 11 July 1984 (age 42)
- Place of birth: Bucharest, Romania
- Height: 1.85 m (6 ft 1 in)
- Position: Striker

Team information
- Current team: FCSB (assistant)

Youth career
- 1993–2003: Sportul Studențesc

Senior career*
Years	Team	Apps	(Gls)
2003–2013	Sportul Studențesc	254	(82)
2013	→ Dinamo Minsk (loan)	14	(6)
2013–2016	Universitatea Craiova	56	(13)
2016–2017	Voluntari	15	(0)
2018	Academica Clinceni	0	(0)
Total		339	(101)

International career
2005–2006	Romania U21	11	(2)
2011	Romania	1	(0)

Managerial career
- 2018–2020: Academica Clinceni (assistant)
- 2020: CFR Cluj (assistant)
- 2021: Kayserispor (assistant)
- 2021–2023: CFR Cluj (assistant)
- 2023–2025: Romania U20
- 2025–2026: Romania U21
- 2026–: FCSB (assistant)
- * Club domestic league appearances and goals

Costin Romeo Curelea (born 11 July 1984) is a Romanian professional football coach and a former player who played as a striker, currently assistant coach at Liga I club FCSB.

== Career ==
In his first league match for Sportul Studenţesc, a Liga II game against Dacia Mioveni, Costin Curelea scored two goals as Sportul won by 3 goals to 1. He played his first Liga I match against Apulum Alba Iulia, on 31 July 2004. After two months, he managed to score his first Liga I goal against FCM Bacău, in a 1–1 draw match played at Regie Stadium.

After Sportul Studenţesc was relegated due to financial reasons at the end of 2005–06 season, Costin Curelea remained at the team, alongside Viorel Ferfelea, Dacian Varga and Tiberiu Bălan. Since then, he was often the team top-scorer. In the 2006–2007 season, Curelea scored 14 goals for his team in 29 matches.

== Career statistics ==
=== Club ===
Appearances and goals by club, season and competition
Club	Season	League			National cup (Note: Includes Cupa României, Belarusian Cup)		Europe		Other		Total	
Club	Season	Division	Apps	Goals	Apps	Goals	Apps	Goals	Apps	Goals	Apps	Goals
Sportul Studenţesc	2003–04	Divizia B	18	4	0	0	—		—		18	4
Sportul Studenţesc	2004–05	Divizia A	23	2	3	1	—		—		26	3
Sportul Studenţesc	2005–06	Divizia A	29	4	1	0	—		—		30	4
Sportul Studenţesc	2006–07	Liga II	30	14	1	0	—		—		31	14
Sportul Studenţesc	2007–08	Liga II	27	8	1	0	—		—		28	8
Sportul Studenţesc	2008–09	Liga II	31	13	4	2	—		—		35	15
Sportul Studenţesc	2009–10	Liga II	29	20	3	0	—		—		32	20
Sportul Studenţesc	2010–11	Liga I	33	9	2	1	—		—		35	10
Sportul Studenţesc	2011–12	Liga I	28	4	0	0	—		—		28	4
Sportul Studenţesc	2012–13	Liga II	6	4	0	0	—		—		6	4
Sportul Studenţesc	Total		254	82	15	4	—		—		269	86
Dinamo Minsk (loan)	2013	Belarusian Premier League	14	6	2	1	—		—		16	7
Universitatea Craiova	2013–14	Liga II	27	10	—		—		—		27	10
Universitatea Craiova	2014–15	Liga I	15	3	1	0	—		1 (Note: Appearances in Cupa Ligii)	0	17	3
Universitatea Craiova	2015–16	Liga I	14	0	1	0	—		1	0	16	0
Universitatea Craiova	Total		56	13	2	0	—		2	0	60	13
Voluntari	2016–17	Liga I	15	0	2	0	—		—		17	0
Academica Clinceni	2017–18	Liga II	0	0	—		—		—		0	0
Career total			339	101	21	5	0	0	2	0	362	106

=== International ===
Appearances and goals by national team and year
National team	Year	Apps	Goals
Romania	2011	1	0
Total		1	0

== Managerial statistics ==
As of match played 6 October 2026

Team	Country	From	To	Record							
Team	Country	From	To	G	W	D	L	GF	GA	GD	Win %
Romania U20	(Romania)	3 August 2023	10 July 2025	16	4	5	7	19	26	−7	25.00
Romania U21	(Romania)	10 July 2025	29 October 2026	11	5	1	5	12	14	−2	45.45
Total				27	9	6	12	31	40	−9	33.33

== Honours ==
Sportul Studențesc

- Divizia B: 2003–04

Universitatea Craiova

- Liga II: 2013–14

Voluntari

- Cupa României: 2016–17

=== Individual ===
- Liga II top scorer: 2006–07 (14 goals)
