= 2006–07 Liga II =

Liga II
- Season: 2006–07
- Promoted: Universitatea Cluj; Gloria Buzău; Dacia Mioveni
- Relegated: Cetatea Suceava; Building Vânju Mare; FC Snagov; Baia Mare; Chimia Brazi; Unirea Dej; CF Brăila; Auxerre Lugoj
- Top goalscorer: Costin Curelea (14 goals)

The 2006–07 Liga II was the 67th season of the second tier of the Romanian football league system. The name of the leagues in Romania was changed started with this season. (Divizia A was renamed as Liga I, Divizia B as Liga II, Divizia C as Liga III, Divizia D as Liga IV).

The format has been changed from three series of 16 teams to two series, each of them consisting of 18 teams. The top two teams from each series were promoted at the end of the season to the Liga I, while the bottom four were relegated to the Liga III.

== Team changes ==
=== To Liga II ===
Promoted from Divizia C

- Delta Tulcea
- FC Snagov
- Chimia Brazi
- Building Vânju Mare
- Oltchim Râmnicu Vâlcea**
- Auxerre Lugoj
- Baia Mare
- Politehnica II Timișoara**
- Prefab Modelu**

Relegated from Divizia A

- Sportul Studențesc București**
- FCM Bacău

=== From Liga II ===
Relegated to Liga III

- Gloria II Bistrița**
- Altay Medgidia**
- Astra Ploiești
- Callatis Mangalia
- Minerul Motru
- Olimpia Satu Mare
- Inter Gaz București
- Petrolul Moinești
- Rapid II București
- Laminorul Roman
- Juventus București
- UTA Arad**
- Portul Constanța
- Dinamo II București
- Unirea Sânnicolau Mare
- Midia Năvodari
- FC Sibiu
- Armătura Zalău

Promoted to Liga I

- Ceahlăul Piatra Neamț
- FC U Craiova
- Liberty Salonta**
- Unirea Urziceni

=== Note (**) ===
Oltchim Râmnicu Vâlcea refused to promote in the Liga II, due to financial reasons, instead of them Apulum Alba Iulia was spared from relegation.

Tractorul Brașov promoted to Liga II, but sold its place to Politehnica II Timișoara.

Politehnica II Iași promoted to Liga II, but sold its place to Prefab Modelu.

Sportul Studențesc București was relegated from Divizia A due to financial reasons, Pandurii Târgu Jiu was spared from relegation.

Gloria II Bistrița withdrew from Liga II before the start of the season, instead of them Unirea Dej was spared from relegation.

Altay Medgidia withdrew from Liga II before the start of the season, instead of them FCM Târgoviște was spared from relegation.

Liberty Salonta sold its Liga I place to UTA Arad, club that initially relegated to Liga III. As a result, UTA Arad played in the 2006–07 Liga I and Liberty Salonta in the 2006–07 Liga III. The two clubs basically changed their places.

=== Renamed teams ===
Precizia Săcele was renamed as FC Săcele.

Poiana Câmpina was renamed as FCM Câmpina.

Dacia Unirea Brăila was renamed as CF Brăila.

== League tables ==
=== Seria I ===
Pos	Team	Pld	W	D	L	GF	GA	GD	Pts	Qualification
1	Delta Tulcea (Note: Delta Tulcea was ineligible for promotion after failed to obtain the license for Liga I.) (C)	34	19	7	8	71	40	+31	64	Ineligible for promotion
2	Gloria Buzău (P)	34	18	8	8	56	38	+18	62	Promotion to Liga I
3	Petrolul Ploiești	34	17	8	9	54	37	+17	59	
4	Forex Brașov	34	17	5	12	45	28	+17	56	
5	FCM Bacău	34	17	9	8	39	21	+18	52 (Note: FCM Bacău were deducted 8 points due to not achieving the 22 points limit in the Divizia A, last season.)	
6	Dunărea Galați	34	14	9	11	34	33	+1	51	
7	Otopeni	34	14	9	11	38	30	+8	51	
8	Sportul Studențesc București	34	13	11	10	45	49	−4	50	
9	Dunărea Giurgiu	34	13	10	11	47	35	+12	49	
10	FC Brașov	34	12	11	11	48	38	+10	47	
11	Botoșani	34	13	7	14	37	38	−1	46	
12	Prefab Modelu	34	12	9	13	46	45	+1	45	
13	Săcele	34	11	10	13	34	43	−9	43	
14	Câmpina	34	11	9	14	33	32	+1	42	
15	Cetatea Suceava (R)	34	10	10	14	43	50	−7	40	Relegation to Liga III
16	FC Snagov (R)	34	8	5	21	29	75	−46	29	Relegation to Liga III
17	Chimia Brazi (R)	34	7	5	22	30	57	−27	26	Relegation to Liga III
18	CF Brăila (R)	34	4	10	20	20	60	−40	22	Relegation to Liga III

Updated to match(es) played on 30 June 2007. Source: romaniansoccer.ro (in Romanian)
Rules for classification: 1) Points; 2) Head-to-head points; 3) Head-to-head goal difference; 4) Head-to-head goals scored; 5) Head-to-head away goals scored; 6) Goal difference; 7) Goals scored.
(C) Champions; (P) Promoted; (R) Relegated

=== Seria II ===
Pos	Team	Pld	W	D	L	GF	GA	GD	Pts	Qualification
1	Universitatea Cluj (C, P)	34	21	9	4	49	21	+28	72	Promotion to Liga I
2	Dacia Mioveni (P)	34	17	9	8	44	26	+18	60	Promotion to Liga I
3	Râmnicu Vâlcea	34	18	5	11	40	31	+9	59	
4	Apulum Alba Iulia	34	15	9	10	34	28	+6	54	
5	Minerul Lupeni	34	16	4	14	39	37	+2	52	
6	Gaz Metan Mediaș	34	15	6	13	54	37	+17	51	
7	FC Caracal	34	15	4	15	40	33	+7	49	
8	IS Câmpia Turzii	34	13	8	13	31	36	−5	47	
9	Politehnica II Timișoara	34	12	10	12	45	37	+8	46	
10	Corvinul 2005 Hunedoara	34	11	13	10	44	40	+4	46	
11	FCM Târgoviște	34	12	10	12	29	31	−2	46	
12	FCM Reșița	34	13	7	14	38	37	+1	46	
13	Bihor Oradea	34	12	10	12	40	42	−2	46	
14	CFR Timișoara	34	13	6	15	37	45	−8	45	
15	Building Vânju Mare (R)	34	11	8	15	28	33	−5	41	Relegation to Liga III
16	Baia Mare (R)	34	9	8	17	27	54	−27	35	Relegation to Liga III
17	Unirea Dej (R)	34	7	6	21	31	62	−31	27	Relegation to Liga III
18	Auxerre Lugoj (R)	34	5	10	19	24	44	−20	25	Relegation to Liga III

Updated to match(es) played on 30 June 2007. Source: romaniansoccer.ro (in Romanian)
Rules for classification: 1) Points; 2) Head-to-head points; 3) Head-to-head goal difference; 4) Head-to-head goals scored; 5) Head-to-head away goals scored; 6) Goal difference; 7) Goals scored.
(C) Champions; (P) Promoted; (R) Relegated

== Top scorers ==
14 goals

- (Romania) Costin Curelea (Sportul Studențesc)

13 goals

- (Romania) Raul Rusescu (Dunărea Giurgiu)
- (Romania) Claudiu Boaru (Gaz Metan Mediaș)

10 goals

- (Romania) Radu Sabo (Universitatea Cluj)

9 goals

- (Romania) Viorel Ferfelea (Sportul Studențesc)

8 goals

- (Romania) Claudiu Ionescu (Dacia Mioveni)

7 goals

- (Romania) Lucian Itu (Minerul Lupeni)
- (Cameroon) Kallé Soné (Câmpina)

5 goals

- (Romania) Viorel Ion (Gloria Buzău)

3 goals

- (Iraq) Salih Jaber (Gloria Buzău)
- (Romania) Ionuț Cazan (Apulum Alba Iulia)
- (Romania) János Székely (Universitatea Cluj)

== See also ==
- 2006–07 Liga I
- 2006–07 Liga III
- 2006–07 Liga IV
