= Bojan Brać =

Serbian footballer (born 1999)

Personal information
- Full name: Bojan Brać
- Date of birth: 28 February 1989 (age 37)
- Place of birth: Titov Vrbas, SFR Yugoslavia
- Height: 1.91 m (6 ft 3 in)
- Position: Goalkeeper

Team information
- Current team: Tekstilac Odžaci
- Number: 1

Youth career
- 2005–2007: Hajduk Kula

Senior career*
Years	Team	Apps	(Gls)
2007–2013	Hajduk Kula	72	(0)
2007–2008	→ Radnički Sombor (loan)	14	(0)
2013–2015	Universitatea Craiova	34	(0)
2017	Dukla Banská Bystrica	11	(0)
2017	Radnički Niš	1	(0)
2018–2019	Hajduk 1912		
2020	Kabel	15	(0)
2021–2025	Tekstilac Odžaci	69	(0)
2025	IMT	16	(0)
2026–	Tekstilac Odžaci	14	(0)
- * Club domestic league appearances and goals as of 14 May 2026

Bojan Brać (Serbian Cyrillic: Бојан Браћ; born 28 February 1989) is a Serbian professional footballer who plays as a goalkeeper for Tekstilac Odžaci.

== Honours ==
Universitatea Craiova

- Liga II: 2013–14
