= Andrei Hergheligiu =

Romanian footballer (born 1992)

Personal information
- Full name: Andrei Mihai Hergheligiu
- Date of birth: 21 March 1992 (age 34)
- Place of birth: Iași, Romania
- Height: 1.81 m (5 ft 11 in)
- Position: Forward

Team information
- Current team: Știința Miroslava
- Number: 14

Youth career
- 2001–2008: LPS Iași
- 2008–2010: Politehnica Iaşi

Senior career*
Years	Team	Apps	(Gls)
2010–2014	CSMS Iași	99	(14)
2014–2016	Universitatea Craiova	44	(7)
2016–2017	Botoșani	28	(1)
2017	Luceafărul Oradea	4	(3)
2017–2018	Hermannstadt	31	(1)
2019–2020	Mioveni	45	(13)
2020–2021	Concordia Chiajna	24	(7)
2021–2025	Corvinul Hunedoara	65	(21)
2025–	Știința Miroslava	0	(0)

International career
2012–2014	Romania U21	4	(0)
- * Club domestic league appearances and goals as of 18 April 2025

Andrei Mihai Hergheligiu (born 21 March 1992) is a Romanian professional footballer who plays as a forward for Liga III club Știința Miroslava.

== Club career ==
=== Youth ===
Hergheligiu started his career as a youth at LPS Iași. He then moved to the youth team of local club Politehnica Iași

=== Politehnica Iași ===
After the dissolution of FC Politehnica Iași (1945) in the summer of 2010, Hergheligiu joined the newly formed FC Politehnica Iaşi now playing in the second tier of Romanian football.

At the end of his second season at the team, Politehnica Iași gained promotion to Liga I with the help of Hergheligiu, who scored 7 goals from 26 appearances. On 17 August, he scored his first Liga I goal against CFR Cluj to aid his team to a 2–2 draw.

=== Universitatea Craiova ===
In the summer of 2014, after he finished his contract with Politehnica Iași, Hergheligiu and teammate Adrian Avrămia, were signed by CS Universitatea Craiova.

He scored his first goal, and also registered an assist, on 29 November, in the 2–0 win against Ceahlăul Piatra Neamț.

== Honours ==
CSMS Iași

- Liga II: 2011–12, 2013–14

Hermannstadt

- Cupa României runner-up: 2017–18

Corvinul Hunedoara

- Liga III: 2021–22, 2022–23
- Cupa României: 2023–24
- Supercupa României runner-up: 2024
