= Andrei Sin =

Romanian footballer

Personal information
- Full name: Andrei Dumitru Sin
- Date of birth: 26 October 1991 (age 35)
- Place of birth: Bucharest, Romania
- Height: 1.75 m (5 ft 9 in)
- Positions: Full-back; winger

Team information
- Current team: Popești-Leordeni
- Number: 20

Youth career
- –2008: Sportul Studențesc
- 2008–2009: Gheorghe Hagi Academy

Senior career*
Years	Team	Apps	(Gls)
2009–2012	Viitorul Constanța	19	(2)
2011	→ Otopeni (loan)	2	(0)
2012	→ Callatis Mangalia (loan)	13	(5)
2012–2013	Delta Tulcea	19	(2)
2013–2015	Universitatea Craiova	23	(3)
2015–2016	Juventus București	10	(1)
2016	Unirea Tărlungeni	12	(2)
2017	ASA Târgu Mureș	11	(0)
2017–2019	Politehnica Iași	62	(3)
2019–2021	Dinamo București	16	(1)
2021	Viitorul Târgu Jiu	7	(0)
2021	Academica Clinceni	0	(0)
2021–2023	Metaloglobus București	23	(1)
2023–2024	Tunari	17	(0)
2025–2026	Gloria Băneasa		
2026–	Popești-Leordeni	4	(0)
- * Club domestic league appearances and goals as of 31 October 2026

Andrei Dumitru Sin (born 26 October 1991) is a Romanian professional footballer who plays as a full-back or a winger for Liga II club Popești-Leordeni.

== Club career ==
=== ASA Târgu Mureș ===
After playing for a number of teams in the Romanian second tier like: Viitorul Constanța, Universitatea Craiova and Delta Tulcea, in January 2017, Sin signed with Liga I club ASA Târgu Mureș. Although he impressed here, ASA Târgu Mureș were relegated and the player soon left the club.

=== Politehnica Iași ===
In July 2017, Sin signed a one-year contract with Moldavian club Politehnica Iași. After a very strong first year with the Liga I team in which they finished the league on sixth place, he signed an extension to his contract to keep him with the club for another two years.

=== Dinamo București ===
On 18 June 2019, Sin signed a contract with Dinamo București. On 16 February 2020, Sin scored his first goal with Dinamo București, from a well-placed free-kick against arch-rivals FCSB, the game ended 2-1 to Dinamo.

In January 2021, he ended his contract with Dinamo.

== Honours ==
Viitorul Constanța

- Liga III: 2009–10

Universitatea Craiova

- Liga II: 2013–14

Juventus București

- Liga III: 2015–16
