= Gabriel Velcovici =

Romanian footballer (born 1984)

Personal information
- Full name: Gabriel Cristian Velcovici
- Date of birth: 2 October 1984 (age 42)
- Place of birth: Craiova, Romania
- Height: 1.78 m (5 ft 10 in)
- Position: Left back

Team information
- Current team: Universitatea Craiova (youth)

Youth career
- –2001: FC Universitatea Craiova

Senior career*
Years	Team	Apps	(Gls)
2001–2003	Extensiv Craiova	26	(1)
2003–2004	FC Universitatea Craiova	28	(3)
2004–2005	FC Caracal	27	(2)
2005–2008	FC Universitatea Craiova	71	(4)
2008–2011	Gloria Bistrița	84	(3)
2012	ALRO Slatina	11	(0)
2012	Olt Slatina	6	(0)
2013	Turnu Severin	4	(0)
2013–2014	CS Universitatea Craiova	13	(1)
Total		270	(14)

International career
2002–2003	Romania U19	5	(1)

Managerial career
- 2015–: Universitatea Craiova (youth)
- * Club domestic league appearances and goals as of 31 October 2018

Gabriel Cristian Velcovici (born 2 October 1984), is a Romanian former football player.

== Honours ==
Universitatea Craiova

- Divizia B: 2005–06
