= Bogdan Vătăjelu =

Romanian footballer (born 1993)

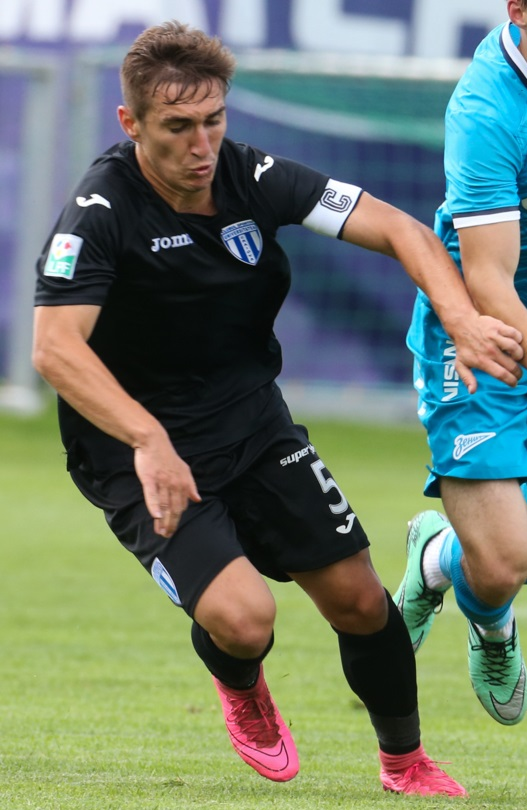
- Vătăjelu captaining Universitatea Craiova in 2016

Personal information
- Full name: Bogdan Ilie Vătăjelu
- Date of birth: 24 April 1993 (age 33)
- Place of birth: Ostroveni, Romania
- Height: 1.71 m (5 ft 7 in)
- Position: Left-back

Team information
- Current team: Sepsi OSK
- Number: 5

Youth career
- 2003–2007: Sporting Râmnicu Vâlcea
- 2007–2009: Steaua București

Senior career*
Years	Team	Apps	(Gls)
2009–2011	Steaua II București	35	(0)
2011–2013	CSM Râmnicu Vâlcea	44	(1)
2013	Metalul Reșița	14	(0)
2014–2016	Universitatea Craiova	104	(8)
2017–2019	Sparta Prague	34	(0)
2019	→ Jablonec (loan)	14	(2)
2019–2023	Universitatea Craiova	100	(3)
2023–2024	Universitatea Cluj	22	(0)
2024–2025	Aktobe	42	(1)
2026	Bihor Oradea	6	(2)
2026–	Sepsi OSK	7	(0)

International career^{‡}
2009–2010	Romania U17	6	(3)
2011–2012	Romania U19	4	(0)
2014–2022	Romania	3	(0)
- * Club domestic league appearances and goals as of 1 November 2026 ‡ National team caps and goals as of 17 November 2022

Bogdan Ilie Vătăjelu (born 24 April 1993) is a Romanian professional footballer who plays as a left-back for Liga I club Sepsi OSK.

== Club career ==
=== Early career ===
Vătăjelu is a product of the Steaua București youth academy and made his professional debut with the reserves in 2010. Making 25 appearances for the reserves, he joined CSM Râmnicu Vâlcea in 2011 playing there until 2013 in Liga II.

In 2013, he signed for Metalul Reșița where he had a brief spell playing in 14 outings. He was named the captain after playing just two matches. During his time in the club, it was reported that Premier League club Sunderland, Championship club Watford and even Spanish club RCD Mallorca showed their interest in signing him.

=== Universitatea Craiova ===
In January 2014, Vătăjelu penned a three-year deal with CS Universitatea Craiova, who were playing in the second league at that time. He made 14 appearances in the remainder of the season and helped his team achieve promotion to the Liga I.

Vătăjelu was Universitatea's most featured player in the 2014–15 season and in 2016 he eventually gained team captaincy. On 2 October 2016, he scored from action in a 1–2 loss against his former club Steaua București.

=== Sparta Prague ===
On 27 December 2016, Vătăjelu signed a 3 1/2-year contract with Czech club Sparta Prague for an undisclosed transfer fee, rumoured to be around €1.4 million.

=== Return to Universitatea Craiova ===
On 26 June 2019, Vătăjelu rejoined Universitatea Craiova by signing a four-year contract.

=== Universitatea Cluj ===
On 24 June 2023, Universitatea Cluj announced the signing of Bogdan Vătăjelu as a free agent, following his departure from CS Universitatea Craiova.

During the 2023–24 season, Vătăjelu made several appearances for the club. In February 2024, his contract with Universitatea Cluj was terminated by mutual consent.

=== FC Aktobe ===
Shortly after leaving the club, he signed with FC Aktobe in Kazakhstan, marking his first experience playing outside Romania.

His contract with Aktobe expired at the end of 2025, and the club confirmed that he would not continue with the team for the 2026 season.

== International career ==
Between 2011 and 2012, he played for Romania under-19 team on four occasions. On 25 May 2014, while still in the second division, he was called to the senior national team for the friendlies against Algeria and Albania.

== Career statistics ==
=== Club ===
As of match played 1 November 2026

Appearances and goals by club, season and competition
Club	Season	League			National cup (Note: Includes Cupa României, Czech Cup, Kazakhstan Cup)		Europe		Other		Total	
Club	Season	Division	Apps	Goals	Apps	Goals	Apps	Goals	Apps	Goals	Apps	Goals
Steaua II București	2009–10	Liga II	10	0	—		—		—		10	0
Steaua II București	2010–11	Liga II	25	0	—		—		—		25	0
Steaua II București	Total		35	0	—		—		—		35	0
CSM Râmnicu Vâlcea	2011–12	Liga II	22	1	0	0	—		—		22	1
CSM Râmnicu Vâlcea	2012–13	Liga II	22	0	0	0	—		—		22	0
CSM Râmnicu Vâlcea	Total		44	1	0	0	—		—		44	1
Metalul Reșița	2013–14	Liga II	14	0	1	0	—		—		15	0
Universitatea Craiova	2013–14	Liga II	14	0	—		—		—		14	0
Universitatea Craiova	2014–15	Liga I	33	1	2	0	—		1 (Note: Appearances in Cupa Ligii)	0	36	1
Universitatea Craiova	2015–16	Liga I	36	5	1	0	—		1	0	38	5
Universitatea Craiova	2016–17	Liga I	21	2	2	0	—		0	0	23	2
Universitatea Craiova	Total		104	8	5	0	—		2	0	111	8
Sparta Prague	2016–17	Czech First League	6	0	—		0	0	—		6	0
Sparta Prague	2017–18	Czech First League	19	0	2	1	1 (Note: Appearances in UEFA Europa League)	0	—		22	1
Sparta Prague	2018–19	Czech First League	9	0	1	0	1	0	—		11	0
Sparta Prague	Total		34	0	3	1	2	0	—		39	1
Jablonec (loan)	2018–19	Czech First League	14	2	—		—		—		14	2
Universitatea Craiova	2019–20	Liga I	23	2	2	0	6	1	—		31	2
Universitatea Craiova	2020–21	Liga I	28	0	5	0	1	0	—		34	0
Universitatea Craiova	2021–22	Liga I	24	0	5	0	1 (Note: Appearances in UEFA Conference League)	0	2 (Note: One appearance in Supercupa României, one appearance in Liga I European play-offs)	0	32	0
Universitatea Craiova	2022–23	Liga I	25	1	2	1	2	0	—		29	2
Universitatea Craiova	Total		100	3	14	1	10	1	2	0	126	5
Universitatea Cluj	2023–24	Liga I	22	0	3	0	—		—		25	0
Aktobe	2024	Kazakhstan Premier League	24	1	5	0	2	0	2 (Note: Appearance in Kazakhstan League Cup)	0	33	1
Aktobe	2025	Kazakhstan Premier League	18	0	0	0	4 (Note: Two appearances in UEFA Europa League, two appearances in UEFA Conference League)	0	1 (Note: Appearance in Kazakhstan Super Cup)	0	23	0
Aktobe	Total		42	1	5	0	6	0	3	0	56	1
Bihor Oradea	2025–26	Liga II	6	2	—		—		—		6	2
Sepsi OSK	2026–27	Liga I	7	0	3	0	—		—		10	0
Career total			422	17	34	2	18	2	7	0	481	21

=== International ===
As of match played 17 November 2022

Appearances and goals by national team and year
National team	Year	Apps	Goals
Romania	2015	2	0
Romania	2022	1	0
Total		3	0

== Honours ==
Universitatea Craiova

- Liga II: 2013–14
- Cupa României: 2020–21
- Supercupa României: 2021

Aktobe

- Kazakhstan Cup: 2024
- Kazakhstan Super Cup runner-up: 2025
