= Ionuț Tîrnăcop =

Romanian footballer

Personal information
- Full name: Ionuț Laurian Tîrnăcop
- Date of birth: 22 April 1987 (age 39)
- Place of birth: Turnu Măgurele, Romania
- Height: 1.81 m (5 ft 11 1/2 in)
- Position: Midfielder

Youth career
- Chimia Turnu Măgurele
- Turris Turnu Măgurele
- Rulmentul Alexandria
- 2004–2005: ȘF "Marius Lăcătuș"

Senior career*
Years	Team	Apps	(Gls)
2005–2012	Sportul Studențesc	38	(1)
2012–2013	Bihor Oradea	11	(1)
2013–2014	Universitatea Cluj	30	(1)
2014–2015	Universitatea Craiova	28	(3)
Total		107	(6)
- * Club domestic league appearances and goals as of 9 October 2017

Ionuţ Laurian Tîrnăcop (born 22 April 1987) is a Romanian former professional football player who played as a midfielder.

== Career ==
Tîrnăcop started playing football when he was eight years old at Chimia, a team from his home town, Turnu Măgurele. When he was fifteen, he made his debut in Liga III with another local team, Turris Turnu Măgurele. One year later he joined Rulmentul Alexandria and in 2004 he moved to the Marius Lăcătuș football school.

In 2005, Tîrnăcop was transferred to Sportul Studențesc where he spent five years before debuting in Liga I in a match against FC Timișoara. In August 2011, he scored his first goal in the first Romanian league against CFR Cluj. At the beginning of 2012, he missed a transfer to the Liga I side, Petrolul Ploiești but, in November 2012, he joined FC Bihor as a free agent.

In April 2013, he was brought to Universitatea Cluj by the manager of the team at that time, Ioan Viorel Ganea, and scored the first goal for his new team in a match against Ceahlăul Piatra Neamț.

In September 2014, he signed a contract with Universitatea Craiova.
