= Ionuț Irimia =

Former Romanian footballer

Personal information
- Date of birth: 17 May 1979 (age 47)
- Place of birth: Bârlad, Romania
- Height: 1.90 m (6 ft 3 in)
- Position: Goalkeeper

Senior career*
Years	Team	Apps	(Gls)
1997–2000	Rulmentul Bârlad	0	(0)
2000–2004	Petrolul Ploiești	46	(0)
2004	Vaslui	2	(0)
2004–2006	Zimbru Chișinău	55	(0)
2006–2007	Petrolul Ploiești	0	(0)
2007–2008	CFR Timișoara	0	(0)
2008–2010	Snagov	25	(0)
2010–2011	Gloria Bistrița	10	(0)
2012–2013	CSMS Iași	38	(0)
2013–2014	Universitatea Craiova	3	(0)
Total		179	(0)
- * Club domestic league appearances and goals as of 5 January 2015

Ionuț Irimia (born 17 May 1979) is a Romanian former football goalkeeper. He played 115 matches in the Romanian top division.

== Club career ==
=== CSMS Iași ===
In March 2012 Irimia joined Liga II team CSMS Iaşi. After half a year in Liga II, Irimia helped his team gain promotion to the Liga I, as they finished the season on 1st place.
