= Madson (footballer, born 1991) =

Brazilian footballer

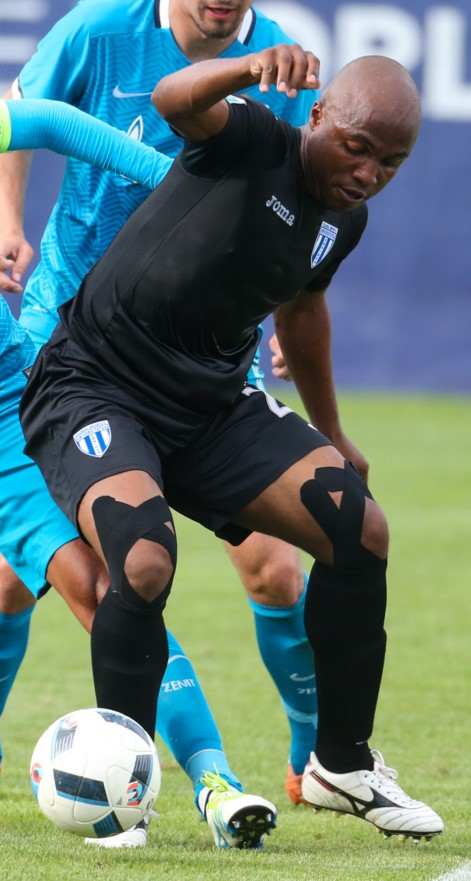

Personal information
- Full name: Madson Henrique Nascimento Santos
- Date of birth: 9 May 1991 (age 35)
- Place of birth: Maceió, Brazil
- Height: 1.78 m (5 ft 10 in)
- Position: Central midfielder

Senior career*
Years	Team	Apps	(Gls)
2010	CSA	1	(0)
2011–2012	Paulista	15	(0)
2012–2013	Atlético Goianiense	6	(0)
2013–2014	Vaslui	25	(2)
2014–2017	Universitatea Craiova	60	(1)
2017–2020	Atromitos	66	(1)
2021	Capivariano	4	(0)
2021	Murici	5	(0)
2022	CSE	8	(0)
2023	Bragantino-PA	2	(0)
- * Club domestic league appearances and goals as of 19:53, 22 October 2024 (UTC)

Madson Henrique Nascimento Santos (born 9 May 1991), commonly known as Madson, is a Brazilian professional footballer who plays as a central midfielder.

== Club career ==
Madson started his career in his home country, where he played for Paulista FC and Atlético Goianiense. In 2013, he was transferred in Europe, to the Romanian squad FC Vaslui.

=== Atromitos ===
On 8 July 2017, Madson moved to the Super League Greece joining Atromitos on a two-year contract. On 14 October 2017, he scored his first goal with a stunning long shot in a 1–0 home win against Asteras Tripolis. As a result of his performances and the attraction of interest from other teams, the administration of the Greek club extended his contract until the summer of 2020. The deal also includes a buy-out clause of €1,000,000. On 28 November 2017, he scored in a 4–0 away win against Sparti in the Greek Cup, securing his team's place in the round of 16.

== Career statistics ==
As of 8 August 2020

Appearances and goals by club, season and competition
Club	Season	League			National cup (Note: Includes Cupa României, Greek Cup)		Continental		Other		Total	
Club	Season	Division	Apps	Goals	Apps	Goals	Apps	Goals	Apps	Goals	Apps	Goals
Vaslui	2013–14	Liga I	25	2	2	1	—		0	0	27	3
Universitatea Craiova	2014–15	Liga I	27	1	2	0	—		1 (Note: Appearance in Cupa Ligii)	0	30	1
Universitatea Craiova	2015–16	Liga I	25	0	0	0	—		1	0	26	0
Universitatea Craiova	2016–17	Liga I	8	0	0	0	—		0	0	8	0
Universitatea Craiova	Total		60	1	2	0	—		2	0	64	1
Atromitos	2017–18	Super League Greece	26	1	4	1	—		—		30	2
Atromitos	2018–19	Super League Greece	24	0	5	0	2 (Note: Appearances in UEFA Europa League)	0	—		31	0
Atromitos	2019–20	Super League Greece	16	0	2	0	4	0	—		22	0
Atromitos	Total		66	1	11	1	6	0	—		83	2
Career total			151	4	15	2	6	0	2	0	174	6
