= Viorel Ferfelea =

Romanian footballer

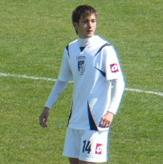

Personal information
- Date of birth: 26 April 1985 (age 41)
- Place of birth: Bucharest, Romania
- Height: 1.75 m (5 ft 9 in)
- Positions: Attacking midfielder; winger

Team information
- Current team: CSM Slatina (assistant)

Youth career
- 1997–1999: Dinamo București
- 1999–2001: Școala de Fotbal Doi Cocoși
- 2001–2004: Sportul Studențesc

Senior career*
Years	Team	Apps	(Gls)
2004–2013	Sportul Studențesc	246	(63)
2013–2016	Universitatea Craiova	36	(5)
2017	ASA Târgu Mureș	15	(0)
2018	Sportul Snagov	13	(4)
2018–2019	CSM Târgu Mureș	14	(30)
2020	Viitorul Domnești		
Total		324	(102)

Managerial career
- 2019: CSM Târgu Mureș (player/assistant)
- 2020–2021: Concordia Chiajna (assistant)
- 2021–2022: Gloria Băneasa
- 2022: Politehnica Iași (video analyst)
- 2023–2024: Agricola Borcea
- 2025: Gloria Băneasa
- 2026: CSM Slatina
- 2026–: CSM Slatina (assistant)
- * Club domestic league appearances and goals

Viorel Ferfelea (born 26 April 1985) is a Romanian professional football coach and former player, currently assistant coach at Liga II club CSM Slatina.

== Career ==
Ferfelea made his debut for Sportul Studenţesc in 2004, in a Divizia A match against Dinamo București. He is one of the top-scorers of his team, scoring nine goals in Liga II's 2006–07 season and six goals in the 2007–08 season, being outmatched only by Costin Curelea.

He was widely known as being the next Gheorghe Hagi with his attacking style of play and his professionalism in the game.

== Honours ==
=== Player ===
Universitatea Craiova

- Liga II: 2013–14

CSM Târgu Mureș

- Liga IV – Mureș County: 2018–19

Viitorul Domnești

- Liga IV – Ilfov County: 2019–20

=== Individual ===
- Liga II top scorer: 2009–10

=== Coach ===
Gloria Băneasa

- Liga IV – Constanța County: 2021–22
