= Cosimo Figliomeni =

Italian footballer (born 1992)

Personal information
- Full name: Cosimo Andrea Figliomeni
- Date of birth: 7 October 1992 (age 34)
- Place of birth: Locri, Italy
- Height: 1.79 m (5 ft 10 in)
- Position: Forward

Team information
- Current team: Gioiosa Jonica

Senior career*
Years	Team	Apps	(Gls)
2010–2011	Roccella		
2011	Catanzaro	7	(0)
2012	Vibonese	13	(3)
2012–2013	HinterReggio	15	(0)
2013–2014	Roccella		
2014–2016	Gaz Metan Mediaș	47	(6)
2018–2019	Siderno		
2019–	Gioiosa Jonica		
Total		82	(9)
- * Club domestic league appearances and goals

Cosimo Andrea Figliomeni (born 7 October 1992) is an Italian football forward who plays for Gioiosa Jonica. From 2014 until 2016 he had his only experience outside Italy playing in Romania for Gaz Metan Mediaș, in the first season he played in Liga I and the second in Liga II.

== Honours ==
Gaz Metan Mediaș

- Liga II: 2015–16
