= Extensiv Stadium =

Sporting venue in Romania

- Interactive map of Extensiv Stadium
- Address: 35 Romanescu Park
- Location: Craiova, Romania
- Coordinates: 44°17′40.7″N 23°48′28″E
- Owner: Eugen Mihăilescu; Nicolae Mihăilescu
- Capacity: 7,000 seated
- Surface: Grass

Construction
- Opened: 1949
- Renovated: 2008, 2015

Tenants
- Extensiv Craiova (1949–2005); Universitatea Craiova (2015–2017); Universitatea II Craiova (2016–2024)

The Extensiv Stadium is a multi-use stadium in Craiova, Romania. It is used mostly for football matches. The stadium holds 7,000 people. The stadium was the home ground of Extensiv Craiova. In 2005 when Extensiv Craiova dissolved, the stadium was abandoned: chairs were broken, but it was saved by Craiova's old boys' team.
