= Dacian Varga =

Romanian footballer

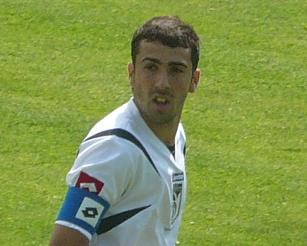

Personal information
- Full name: Dacian Șerban Varga
- Date of birth: 15 October 1984 (age 42)
- Place of birth: Petroșani, Romania
- Height: 1.73 m (5 ft 8 in)
- Position: Winger

Youth career
- 1996–2001: Dinamo București
- 2001–2003: Sportul Studențesc

Senior career*
| Years | Team | Apps | (Gls) |
| 2003–2013 | Sportul Studențesc | 135 | (21) |
| 2009 | → Unirea Urziceni (loan) | 22 | (5) |
| 2010 | → Rapid București (loan) | 1 | (0) |
| 2011 | → Kuban Krasnodar (loan) | 27 | (1) |
| 2012 | → Vaslui (loan) | 15 | (2) |
| 2013–2015 | Universitatea Craiova | 15 | (3) |
| 2015 | ASA Târgu Mureş | 0 | (0) |
| 2015–2016 | Petrolul Ploiești | 17 | (1) |
| 2016 | Bregalnica Štip | 0 | (0) |
| 2019 | ACS FC Dinamo | | |
| Total | | 232 | (33) |

International career
| 2006 | Romania U21 | 2 | (0) |
| 2009–2011 | Romania | 4 | (0) |
- * Club domestic league appearances and goals

Dacian Şerban Varga (born 15 October 1984) is a Romanian former professional footballer who played as a winger.

== Club career ==
=== Childhood ===
Varga began his football career at the age of 8, when his father took him at an indoor-football club based in Deva, a neighbour city of Petroșani. He played for this club until 1996, when he moved at Dinamo Bucharest's youngsters.

=== Dinamo București ===
At the age of 12, Varga moved to Dinamo's youngsters. He was trained by two former glories, Gheorghe Mihali and Iulian Mihăescu. He became national champion with his teammates before moving to another football club based in Bucharest, Sportul Studențesc.

=== Sportul Studențesc youngsters ===
Varga arrived at Sportul Studențesc when he was 17. Before playing for the senior team, he played until 2003 at Sportul Studențesc youngsters, a well-known Youth Academy in Bucharest and in Romania. When he arrived at Sportul, he had a controversy with his coach, Cornel Jurcă, in his first match for Sportul's second team, and he was relegated to the Youth Team. The Youth Team coach, Cristian Sava, helped Varga very much, and in 2004, Varga was ready for playing in the Romanian top division, then called Divizia A.

=== Sportul Studențesc ===
His first season at Sportul Studențesc found his team playing in Divizia B. After a good season, the team promoted again in Divizia A. His first match in Divizia A was against Dinamo București, his former club. After playing only eight matches in the first Divizia A season, he became again a first-team player for Sportul in the 2005–06 season. He scored his first Divizia A goal in a match against Jiul Petroșani. The second goal came in a match against Politehnica Timișoara, in 2006. He scored another goal in a thrilling 5–4 victory for Sportul Studențesc against Dinamo Bucharest, beating Dinamo goalkeeper Cristian Munteanu in the last minute. After Sportul Studențesc relegated in the second division, Varga became the star-player of the team, after a lot of first-team players, like Ionuţ Mazilu, Stelian Stancu, Costin Lazăr or Eduard Stăncioiu left the team. In 2013, after a litigation with Sportul, when unsuccessfully trying to left the team, Varga was declared free agent by Romanian Football Federation, after 10 years spent here.

=== Unirea Urziceni ===
In January 2009, Varga was loaned to Unirea Urziceni, thus ending a two-year absence from Liga I. He scored four goals, including a winning strike against title contenders Dinamo, as the team surprisingly finished on top of the table.

During the summer of 2009, Varga was in talks with a number of teams, but ultimately returned to the Ialomița-based team for a one-year loan. Varga made his debut in European competitions in a UEFA Champions League clash against Sevilla FC on 16 September and scored in a 1–1 draw with VfB Stuttgart two weeks later. It was the first goal ever scored in a European competition by Unirea Urziceni.

=== CS Universitatea Craiova ===
On 18 December 2013, Varga joined Liga II club CS Universitatea Craiova on a free transfer. He was released in March 2015

=== ASA Târgu Mureș ===
In June 2015, Varga signed a contract with ASA Târgu Mureș where he reunited with coach Dan Petrescu. He played in the first squad in Romanian Supercup, on 8 July, against Steaua București, but after the game Petrescu left the club and five days later Varga ended his contract with ASA on mutual agreement.

== International career ==
Dacian Varga is a former member of Romania national under-21 football team. He made his debut for Romania U21 team in a match against Turkey U-21 football team, in February 2006. Romania lost the match, and Varga played 60 minutes. The second, and also the last match played by Varga for Romania U-21 football team, was against Switzerland U-21 football team, a 3–3 draw.

In February 2009, Dacian made his debut for Romania national football team in a friendly match against Croatia. He came off the bench in the second half as a substitute. He is only the second player in Romania's history to be capped while playing for a second league club.

== Personal life ==
He is the son of Ioan Varga, a former player of Dinamo București and Jiul Petroșani.

== Career statistics ==
Appearances and goals by national team and year
| National team | Year | Apps | Goals |
|---|---|---|---|
Romania
| Romania | 2009 | 3 | 0 |
| Romania | 2010 | 0 | 0 |
| Romania | 2011 | 1 | 0 |
| Total | | 4 | 0 |

== Honours ==
Sportul Studențesc

- Divizia B: 2003–04

Unirea Urziceni

- Liga I: 2008–09
- Supercupa României runner-up: 2009

Universitatea Craiova

- Liga II: 2013–14

ASA Târgu Mureș

- Supercupa României: 2015
