= Adrian Avrămia =

Romanian footballer

Personal information
- Date of birth: 31 January 1992 (age 34)
- Place of birth: Fălticeni, Romania
- Height: 1.90 m (6 ft 3 in)
- Position: Centre back

Youth career
- 2003–2006: Juventus Fălticeni
- 2006–2007: Nicu Gane Fălticeni
- 2007–2010: Politehnica Iași

Senior career*
Years	Team	Apps	(Gls)
2010–2014	Politehnica Iași	34	(1)
2014–2015	Universitatea Craiova	1	(0)
2015–2016	Rapid București	13	(0)
2016–2017	Dinamo Brest	21	(0)
2018	Irtysh Pavlodar	9	(0)
2019–2020	Foresta Suceava	4	(0)
Total		82	(1)

International career^{‡}
2011	Romania U19	2	(0)
2012–2014	Romania U21	6	(0)

Managerial career
- 2021–2024: Șomuz Fălticeni (assistant)
- * Club domestic league appearances and goals as of 10:11, 14 September 2021 (UTC) ‡ National team caps and goals as of 10:11, 14 September 2021 (UTC)

Adrian Avrămia (born 31 January 1992) is a Romanian former professional footballer who played as a centre back for teams such as Politehnica Iași, Dinamo Brest, Irtysh Pavlodar or Foresta Suceava, among others.

== Club career ==
=== Youth ===
Avrămia played for the youth teams of Juventus Fălticeni, Nicu Gane Fălticeni and later Politehnica Iași until its dissolution in 2010.

=== Politehnica Iași ===
In the summer of 2010 he moved to the recently formed Politehnica Iaşi in the Liga II alongside Andrei Hergheligiu. Playing in the second tier of Romanian football he had more chances to make an impact. He made his debut in senior football later that year.

In September 2011 he suffered a meniscus injury. He had to undergo surgery to repair it and was subsequently sidelined for the rest of the 2011–12 Liga II season. After he recovered from his injury, Avrămia made his Liga I debut in the 2012–13 Liga I season.

=== Irtysh Pavlodar ===
On 24 January 2018 Avrămia signed for Irtysh Pavlodar. On 26 July 2018, Avrămia left Irtysh Pavlodar by mutual consent.

=== Foresta Suceava ===
On 5 August 2019, Avrămia signed a one-year contract with Liga III side Foresta Suceava.

== International career ==
He played for Romania U19 in the UEFA European Under-19 Football Championship, a tournament which took place in Romania.

== Honours ==
Dinamo Brest

- Belarusian Cup: 2016–17
