= Stadionul Ion Oblemenco (1967) =

Football stadium in Romania

Coordinates: 44°18′50″N 23°47′03″E

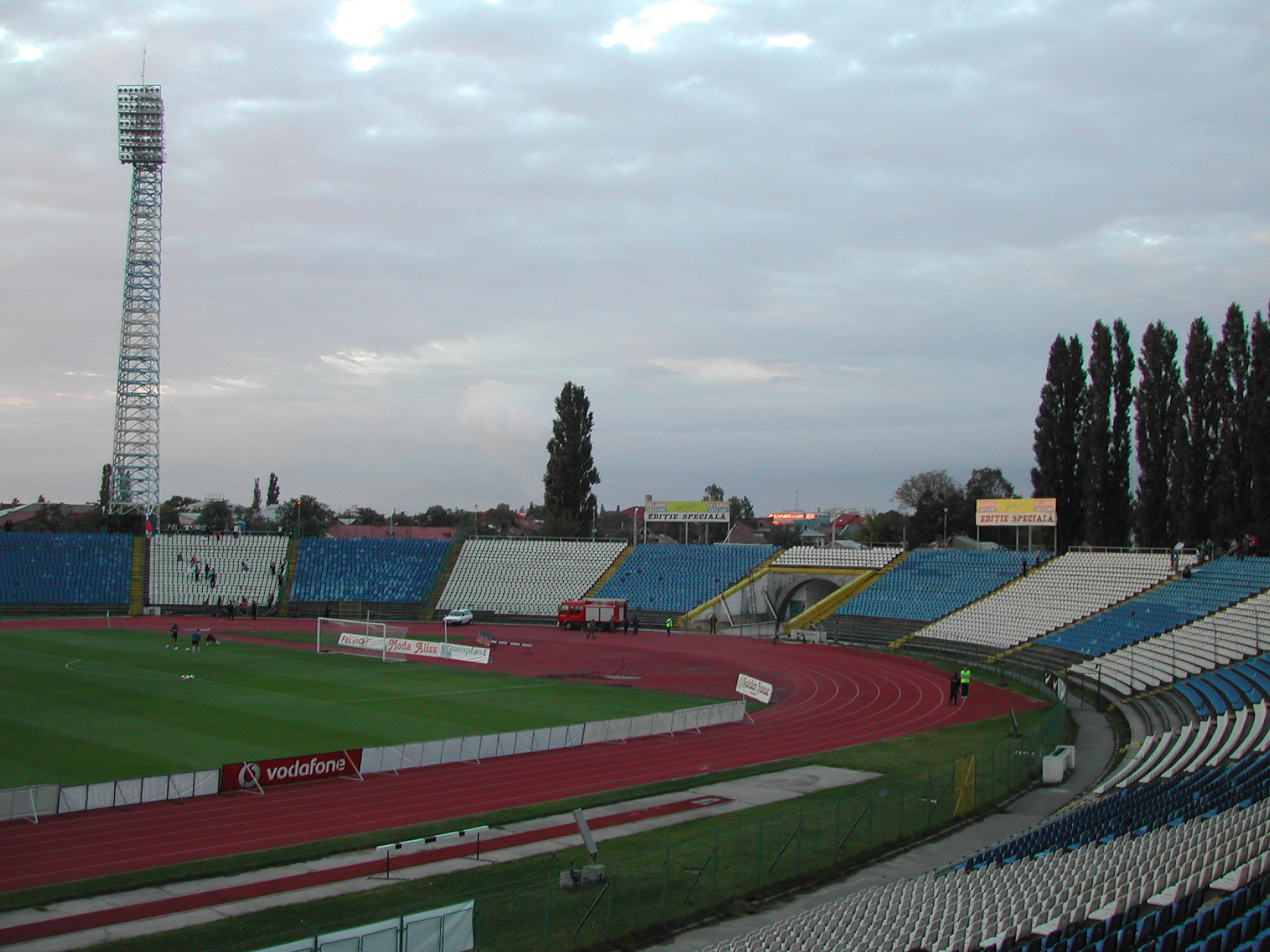
- Stadionul Ion Oblemenco
- Interactive map of Stadionul Ion Oblemenco
- Former names: Stadionul Central
- Location: Craiova, Romania
- Owner: Municipality of Craiova
- Capacity: 25,252

Construction
- Built: 2017
- Opened: 29 October 1967
- Renovated: 2008
- Closed: 2014
- Demolished: 2015

Tenants
- Universitatea Craiova (1948–1991)(2013–2014); FC U Craiova (1991–2014)

Ion Oblemenco Stadium was a multi-purpose stadium in Craiova, Romania. It was used mostly for football matches and was the home ground of Universitatea Craiova. The stadium used to hold up to 25,252 people before it was demolished.

The stadium was entirely demolished and was replaced by an all-seater that was opened in November 2017.

== History ==
The stadium was opened on 29 October 1967 with national teams of Romania and Poland scoring 2 goals each and was originally named Central Stadium. It hosted many memorable matches during the Craiova Maxima era such as the 1981–82 European Cup Quarterfinal against Bayern Munich and the 1982–83 UEFA Cup Semifinal against Benfica.

Following the death of Universitatea Craiova legend Ion Oblemenco in 1996, the stadium was renamed in his honour. In 2008, the stadium underwent a major renovation.

=== Romania national football team ===
The following national team matches were held in the stadium:

#	Date	Score	Opponent	Competition
1.	7 June 2003	2–0	Bosnia and Herzegovina	UEFA Euro 2004 qualifying
2.	4 September 2004	2–1	Macedonia	2006 FIFA World Cup qualification

== Gallery ==
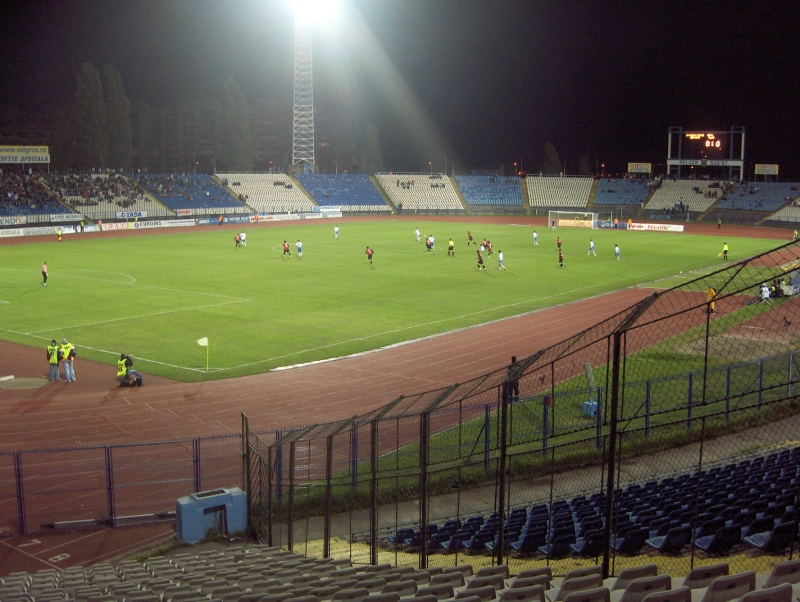
Ion Oblemenco Stadium
Panorama

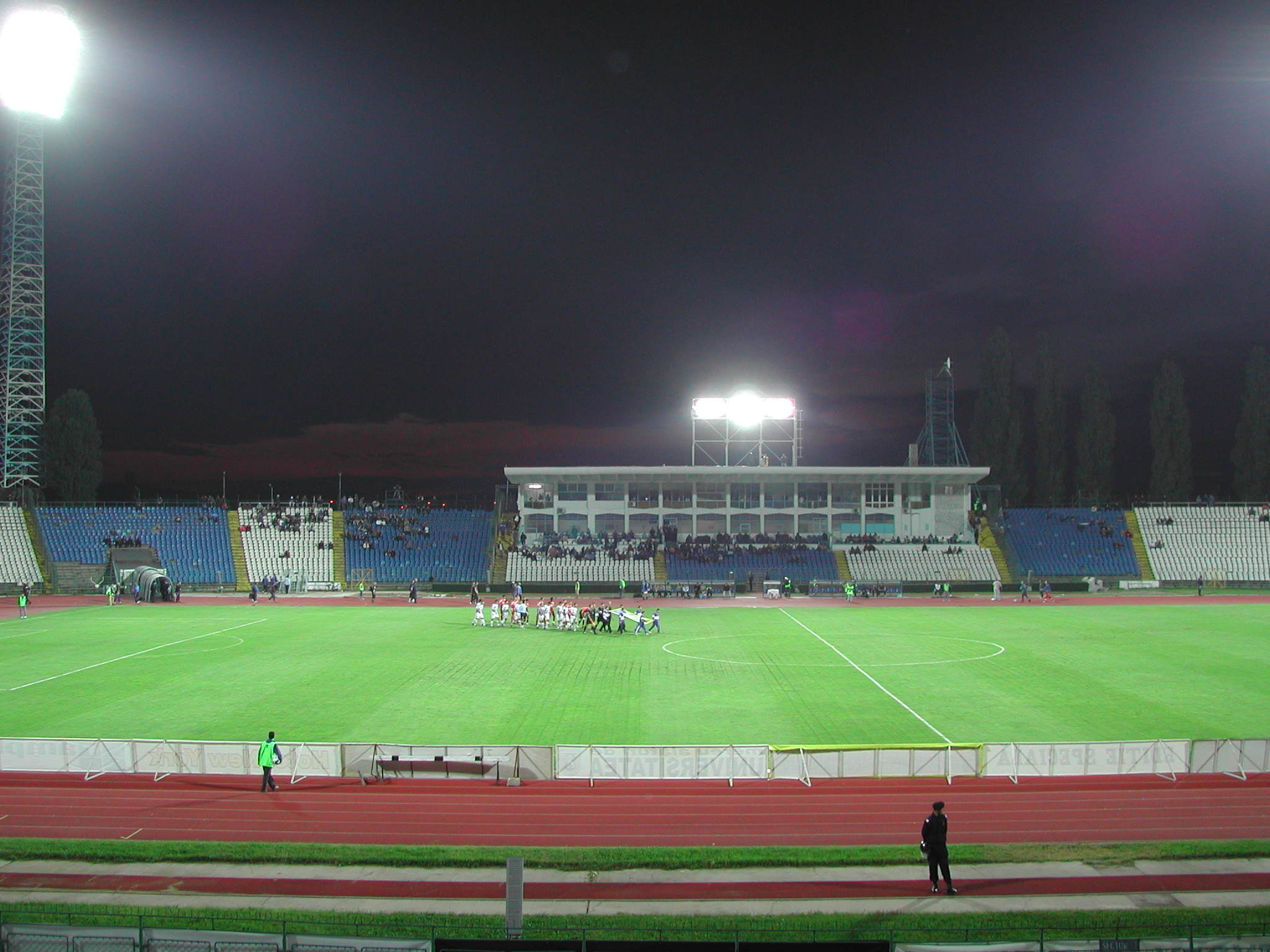
Ion Oblemenco Stadium
Main Stand

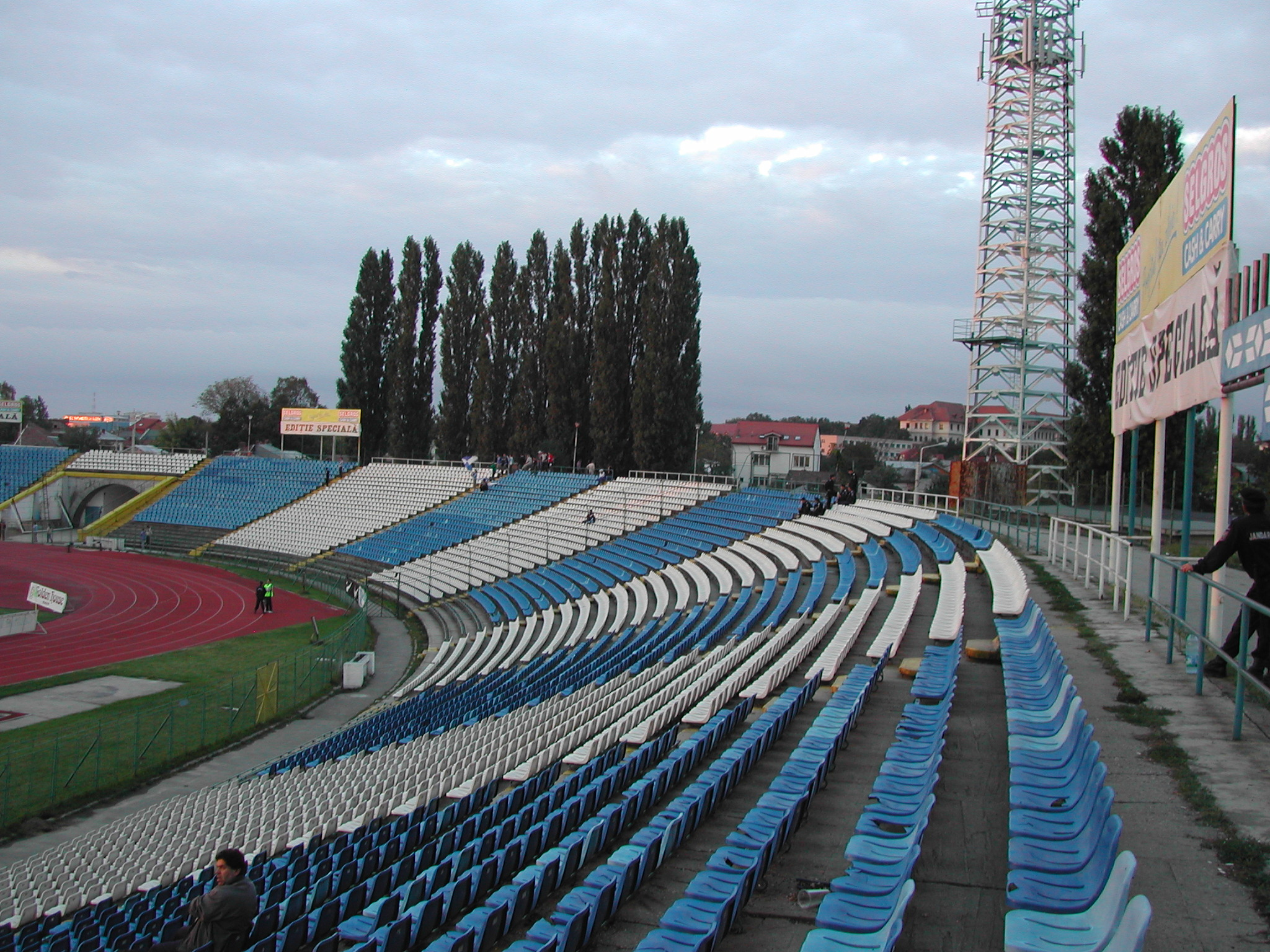
Ion Oblemenco Stadium
Second Stand and North End

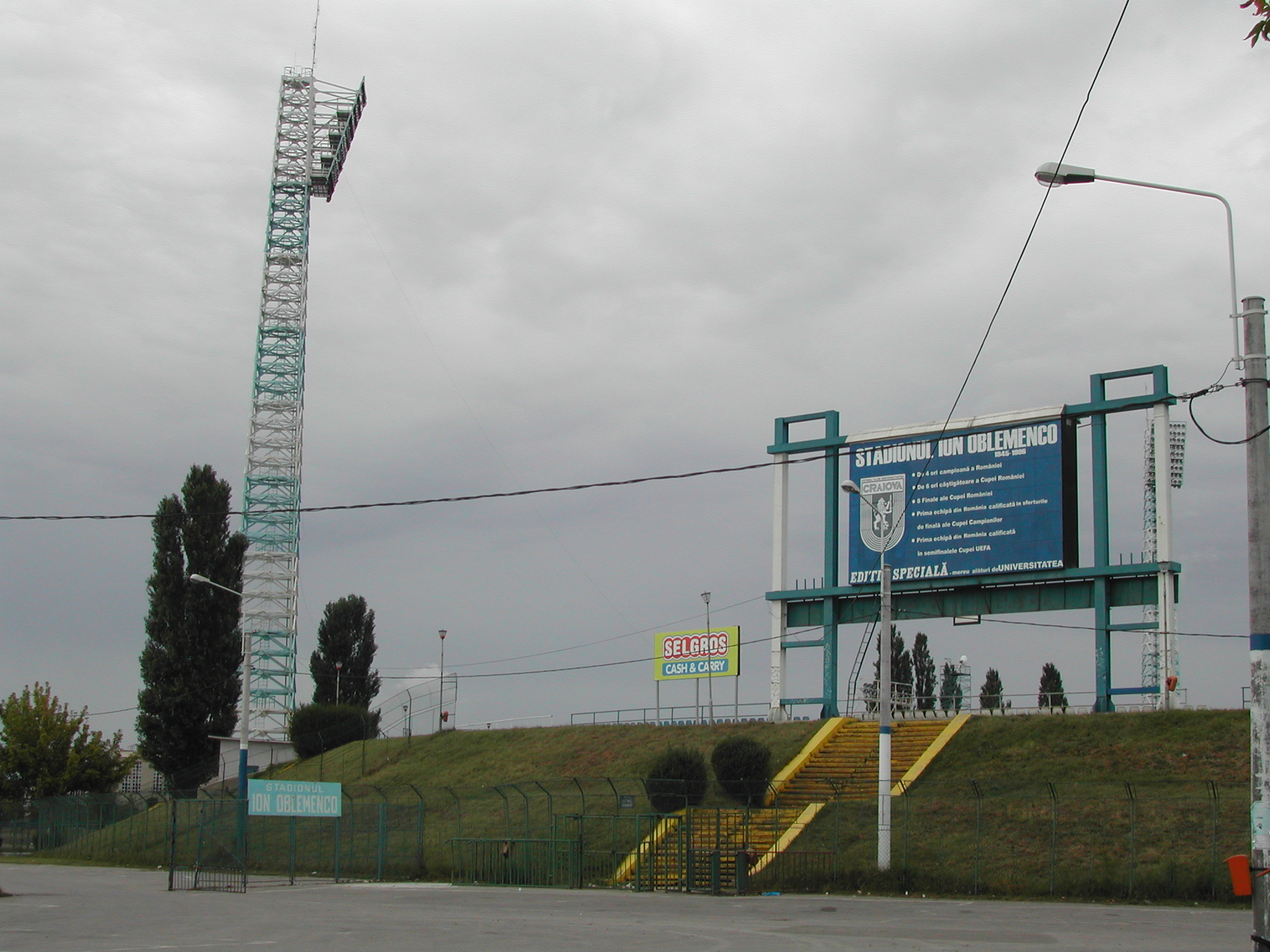
Ion Oblemenco Stadium
Exterior View

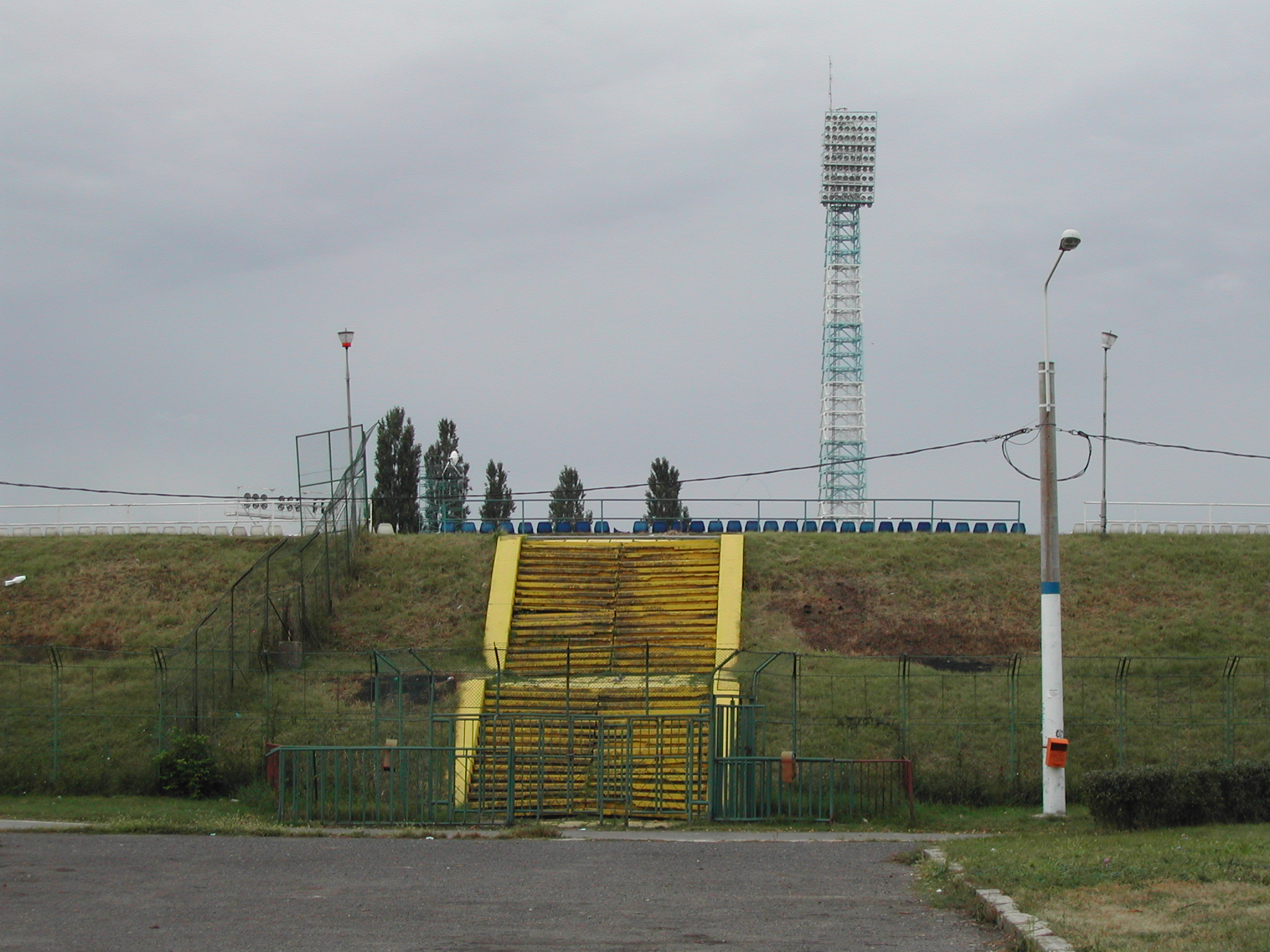
Ion Oblemenco Stadium
Exterior View

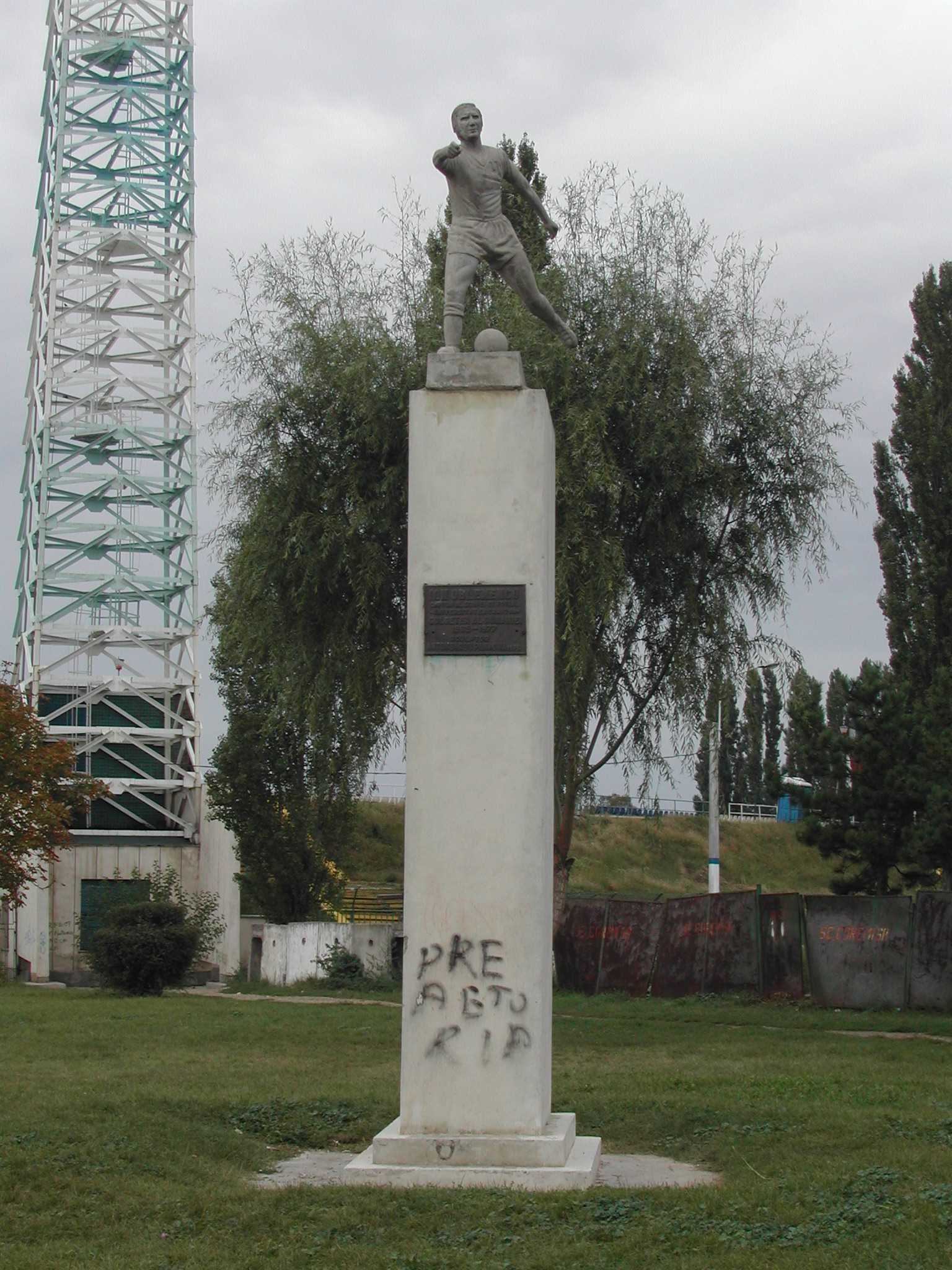
Ion Oblemenco statue in front of the stadium

== See also ==
- List of football stadiums in Romania.
