= 2013–14 Liga II =

Liga II
- Season: 2013–14
- Promoted: CSMS Iaşi; Universitatea Craiova; Rapid București; ASA Târgu Mureş
- Relegated: Dunărea Galaţi; Gloria Bistriţa; Minerul Motru; UTA Arad; FC U Craiova
- Biggest home win: Bacău 5–1 Rapid CFR Suceava
- Biggest away win: Bacău 1–4 Clinceni
- Highest scoring: Rapid București 5–2 Brăila; Brăila 5–2 Rapid CFR Suceava
- All statistics correct as of 8 May 2014.

The 2013–14 Liga II was the 74th season of the Liga II, the second tier of the Romanian football league system. The season began on 7 September.

The 25 teams were divided in two series (with 13, respectively 12 teams). The regular season was played in a round-robin tournament. The first six teams from each series played a play-off for promotion to Liga I. The teams placed 6th to 12th played in a Relegation play-out. The first two teams in each series promoted at the end of the season to Liga I, and the teams placed below the 10th place were relegated to Liga III.

== Teams ==
At the end of 2012–13 season, Botoșani, Săgeata Năvodari from Seria I and Corona Brașov, ACS Poli Timișoara promoted to Liga I. Four teams were relegated to Liga III: Chindia Târgoviște, Dinamo II (Seria I), FCMU Baia Mare and Unirea Alba Iulia.

The winners of the six 2012–13 Liga III series were promoted to Liga II: SC Bacău, Gloria Buzău, ACS Berceni, Minerul Motru, Olimpia Satu Mare and Unirea Tărlungeni.

After the end of the last season, FC Delta Tulcea, CS Otopeni and FC Argeș were dissolved. Luceafărul Oradea withdrew from Liga II and enrolled to Liga IV.

=== Craiova teams ===
Following a legal decision, FC U Craiova was re-enrolled by the Romanian Football Federation to the second series of Liga II. A second place was offered to Universitatea Craiova, the team supported by the local authorities.

=== Renamed teams ===
CS Buftea was moved to Clinceni and renamed FC Clinceni, while Damila Măciuca was moved to Reșita, becoming Metalul Reșița. FCM Târgu Mureș was renamed ASA Târgu Mureș.

=== Excluded teams ===
Sportul Studențesc was excluded for the championship because the team was not programmed in the first four rounds due to a debt to Rapid CFR Suceava.

=== Seria I ===
Location of teams in 2013–14 Liga II – Seria I

Club	City	Stadium	Capacity
SC Bacău	Bacău	Municipal	17,500
Berceni	Berceni	Berceni	2,600
Brăila	Brăila	Municipal	18,000
Clinceni	Clinceni	Clinceni	2,000
Dunărea Galați	Galați	Dunărea	23,000
Farul Constanța	Constanța	Farul	15,500
Gloria Buzău	Buzău	Municipal	18,000
Rapid București	Bucharest	Giulești-Valentin Stănescu	11,704
Rapid CFR	Suceava	Areni	12,000
Studențesc Iași	Iași	Emil Alexandrescu	11,390
Unirea Slobozia	Slobozia	1 Mai	5,000
Unirea Tărlungeni	Tărlungeni	Unirea	1,000

=== Seria II ===
Location of teams in 2013–14 Liga II – Seria II

Club	City	Stadium	Capacity
Târgu Mureș	Târgu Mureș	Trans-Sil	8,200
Bihor Oradea	Oradea	Iuliu Bodola	18,000
Universitatea Craiova	Craiova	Ion Oblemenco	25,252
Gloria Bistrița	Bistrița	Gloria	7,800
Metalul	Reșița	Mircea Chivu	12,000
Minerul	Motru	Minerul	5,000
Mioveni	Mioveni	Dacia	10,000
Olimpia	Satu Mare	Olimpia	18,000
Olt Slatina	Slatina	1 Mai	4,000
Râmnicu Vâlcea	Râmnicu Vâlcea	Municipal	12,000
FC U Craiova	Drobeta-Turnu Severin	Municipal	20,054
UTA Arad	Arad	Francisc von Neumann	7,287

== League tables ==
=== Seria I ===
Pos	Team	Pld	W	D	L	GF	GA	GD	Pts	Qualification
1	CSMS Iași	22	16	1	5	47	16	+31	49	Qualification to promotion play-off
2	Unirea Slobozia	22	12	5	5	29	22	+7	41 (Note: UNI 1-0 RAP; RAP 0–1 UNI)	Qualification to promotion play-off
3	Rapid București	22	12	5	5	34	20	+14	41	Qualification to promotion play-off
4	Academica Clinceni	22	10	7	5	41	28	+13	37	Qualification to promotion play-off
5	Berceni	22	10	6	6	33	26	+7	36	Qualification to promotion play-off
6	Bacău	22	8	5	9	29	31	−2	29	Qualification to promotion play-off
7	Unirea Tărlungeni	22	7	6	9	18	22	−4	27	Qualification to relegation play-out
8	Gloria Buzău	22	5	10	7	25	24	+1	25	Qualification to relegation play-out
9	Brăila	22	6	5	11	24	34	−10	23	Qualification to relegation play-out
10	Rapid CFR Suceava	22	4	7	11	22	42	−20	19	Qualification to relegation play-out
11	Farul Constanța	22	4	6	12	12	35	−23	18	Qualification to relegation play-out
12	Dunărea Galați	22	4	5	13	24	38	−14	17	Qualification to relegation play-out

Source: FRF (in Romanian)
Rules for classification: 1st points; 2nd head-to-head points; 3rd head-to-head goal difference; 4th head-to-head goals scored; 5th head-to-head away goals scored; 6th goal difference; 7th number of goals scored

=== Seria II ===
Pos	Team	Pld	W	D	L	GF	GA	GD	Pts	Qualification
1	Universitatea Craiova	22	15	4	3	33	11	+22	49	Qualification to promotion play-off
2	Metalul Reșița	22	11	4	7	29	18	+11	37	Qualification to promotion play-off
3	Râmnicu Vâlcea	22	10	6	6	26	18	+8	36 (Note: OLT 0-0 CSM; CSM 1–0 OLT)	Qualification to promotion play-off
4	Olt Slatina	22	10	6	6	24	16	+8	36	Qualification to promotion play-off
5	Târgu Mureș	22	9	7	6	25	14	+11	34 (Note: ASA 2-1 GLO; GLO 2–1 ASA)	Qualification to promotion play-off
6	Gloria Bistrița	22	10	4	8	23	19	+4	34	Qualification to promotion play-off
7	Olimpia Satu Mare	22	9	6	7	22	19	+3	33	Qualification to relegation play-out
8	Mioveni	22	8	5	9	21	24	−3	29	Qualification to relegation play-out
9	Bihor Oradea	22	7	5	10	18	21	−3	26	Qualification to relegation play-out
10	UTA Arad	22	5	6	11	19	30	−11	21	Qualification to relegation play-out
11	FC U Craiova	22	4	5	13	9	39	−30	17	Qualification to relegation play-out
12	Minerul Motru	22	3	4	15	17	37	−20	13	Qualification to relegation play-out

Source: FRF (in Romanian)
Rules for classification: 1st points; 2nd head-to-head points; 3rd head-to-head goal difference; 4th head-to-head goals scored; 5th head-to-head away goals scored; 6th goal difference; 7th number of goals scored

== Promotion play-offs ==
At the end of the regular season, the first six teams from each series will play a Promotion play-off and the winners and runners-up will promote to the Liga I. The teams will start the play-off with the number of points gained in the regular season only against the other qualified teams.

=== Seria I ===
Pos	Team	Pld	W	D	L	GF	GA	GD	Pts	Promotion
1	CSMS Iași (C, P)	20	11	5	4	35	18	+17	38	Promotion to Liga I
2	Rapid București (P)	20	9	8	3	26	18	+8	35	Promotion to Liga I
3	Unirea Slobozia	20	10	3	7	23	21	+2	33	
4	Academica Clinceni	20	9	5	6	30	23	+7	32	
5	Berceni	20	3	5	12	23	41	−18	14	
6	Bacău	20	3	4	13	18	34	−16	13	

Source: FRF (in Romanian)
Rules for classification: 1st points; 2nd head-to-head points; 3rd head-to-head goal difference; 4th head-to-head goals scored; 5th head-to-head away goals scored; 6th goal difference; 7th number of goals scored
(C) Champions; (P) Promoted

=== Seria II ===
Pos	Team	Pld	W	D	L	GF	GA	GD	Pts	Promotion or relegation
1	Universitatea Craiova (C, P)	20	11	4	5	30	19	+11	37	Promotion to Liga I
2	Târgu Mureș (P)	20	10	4	6	25	14	+11	34	Promotion to Liga I
3	Râmnicu Vâlcea	20	8	6	6	20	19	+1	30	
4	Metalul Reșița	20	7	5	8	20	23	−3	26	
5	Gloria Bistrița	20	6	6	8	22	27	−5	24	Relegation to Liga III (Note: Gloria Bistrița denied to take part in the next season and was relegated to Liga III.)
6	Olt Slatina	20	4	3	13	10	25	−15	15	

Source: FRF (in Romanian)
Rules for classification: 1st points; 2nd head-to-head points; 3rd head-to-head goal difference; 4th head-to-head goals scored; 5th head-to-head away goals scored; 6th goal difference; 7th number of goals scored
(C) Champions; (P) Promoted

== Relegation play-outs ==
At the end of the regular season, the teams that finish 7-12 form each series will play a Relegation play-out and the last three teams will relegate to the Liga III. The teams will start the play-out with the number of points gained in the regular season only against the other qualified teams.

=== Seria I ===
Pos	Team	Pld	W	D	L	GF	GA	GD	Pts	Relegation
7	Brăila	20	10	4	6	23	20	+3	34	
8	Gloria Buzău	20	9	5	6	30	22	+8	32	
9	Unirea Tărlungeni	20	8	7	5	24	19	+5	31	
10	Rapid CFR Suceava	20	8	5	7	29	29	0	29	Spared from relegation (Note: Rapid CFR Suceava was spared from relegation after the dissolution of Vaslui and Corona Brașov)
11	Dunărea Galați (R)	20	7	5	8	23	21	+2	26	Relegation to Liga III (Note: Farul Constanța was spared from relegation after Dunărea Galați was dissolved)
12	Farul Constanța	20	3	4	13	14	32	−18	13	Spared from relegation

Source: FRF (in Romanian)
Rules for classification: 1st points; 2nd head-to-head points; 3rd head-to-head goal difference; 4th head-to-head goals scored; 5th head-to-head away goals scored; 6th goal difference; 7th number of goals scored
(R) Relegated

=== Seria II ===
Pos	Team	Pld	W	D	L	GF	GA	GD	Pts	Relegation
7	Olimpia Satu Mare	18	13	3	2	34	11	+23	42	
8	Mioveni	18	10	4	4	28	15	+13	34	
9	Bihor Oradea	18	8	5	5	23	17	+6	29	
10	Minerul Motru (R)	18	4	4	10	21	23	−2	16	Relegation to Liga III
11	UTA Arad (R)	18	3	3	12	10	35	−25	12	Relegation to Liga III
12	FC U Craiova (Note: FC U Craiova was officially excluded from the championship on April 3, 2014.) (R)	10	1	3	6	5	20	−15	6	Relegation to Liga III

Source: FRF (in Romanian)
Rules for classification: 1st points; 2nd head-to-head points; 3rd head-to-head goal difference; 4th head-to-head goals scored; 5th head-to-head away goals scored; 6th goal difference; 7th number of goals scored
(R) Relegated

== Goals ==
5 goals

- Daniel Bălan (Rapid CFR Suceava)

3 goals

- Cristian Silvăşan (Farul Constanța)

== See also ==
- 2013–14 Liga I
- 2013–14 Liga III
