= 2017–18 CS Universitatea Craiova season =

Universitatea Craiova
2017–18 season
- Chairman: Marcel Popescu
- Manager: Devis Mangia
- Stadium: Ion Oblemenco
- Liga I: 3rd
- Cupa României: Winners
- Europa League: Third qualifying round
- Top goalscorer: League: Gustavo Vagenin (9 goals); All: Alexandru Băluță (11 goals)
- Highest home attendance: 29,000 vs FCSB (May 14, 2018)
- Lowest home attendance: 600
- Average home league attendance: 8,280
- Biggest win: U Craiova 5–1 FC Botoșani
- Biggest defeat: U Craiova 2–5 FCSB
Home colours	Away colours	Third colours

The 2017–18 CS Universitatea Craiova season is the 66th season in the football club's history and 4th consecutive and 51st overall season in the top flight of Romanian football, the Liga I, having been promoted from the Liga II in 2014. Universitatea Craiova also are participating in this season's edition of the domestic cup Cupa României, and the UEFA Europa League. This is the 1st season for Universitatea in the rebuilt Ion Oblemenco stadium, located in Craiova, Romania. The season covers a period from 1 July 2017 to 30 June 2018.

== Season overview ==
=== Background ===
In the previous season, Universitatea finished in the fifth position and qualified for European football for the first time since the 1992–93 UEFA Cup. They were knocked out of the Romanian Cup in the semi-finals by FC Voluntari.

== Previous season positions ==
	Competition	Position
(Romania)	Liga I	5th
(Romania)	Cupa României	Semifinals
(Romania)	Cupa Ligii	Qualifying Round

== Players ==
=== Squad information ===
As of 9 March 2018

Note: Flags indicate national team as defined under FIFA eligibility rules; some limited exceptions apply. Players may hold more than one non-FIFA nationality.

No.	Pos.	Nation	Player
1	GK	MDA	Nicolae Calancea
2	DF	POR	Tiago Ferreira
3	DF	ROU	Marius Briceag
4	DF	ROU	Răzvan Popa
5	MF	ROU	Vladimir Screciu
6	DF	CRO	Renato Kelić
7	MF	BRA	Gustavo
8	MF	ROU	Alexandru Mateiu
10	MF	ROU	Alexandru Băluță (Captain)
11	MF	ROU	Nicușor Bancu
14	FW	CRO	Dominik Glavina
16	FW	ROU	Jovan Marković
17	MF	ROU	Ovidiu Bic
18	DF	BUL	Apostol Popov
21	MF	ITA	Fausto Rossi
23	MF	BUL	Hristo Zlatinski (Vice-Captain)

No.	Pos.	Nation	Player
24	DF	ROU	Florin Gardoș (on loan from Southampton)
26	MF	POR	André Santos (on loan from Arouca)
27	DF	SUI	Ivan Martić
28	MF	ROU	Alexandru Mitriță
30	DF	BUL	Radoslav Dimitrov
36	FW	ROU	Andrei Burlacu
39	DF	ROU	Adrian Juncu
42	FW	ROU	Raoul Baicu
43	MF	ROU	Lucian Buzan
47	DF	ROU	Vasile Constantin
49	GK	ROU	Laurențiu Popescu
50	GK	ROU	Cristian Dică
51	GK	SUI	Miodrag Mitrović
52	DF	ROU	Ionuț Puțaru
56	FW	ROU	Valentin Mihăilă
77	MF	ROU	Cristian Bărbuț

=== Transfers ===
==== In ====
No.	Pos.	Nat.	Name	Age	EU	Moving from	Type	Transfer window	Ends	Transfer fee	Source
9	FW	(Romania)	Mihai Roman	25	EU	NEC (Netherlands)	Transfer	Summer	2020	€129,000	ucv1948.com
21	MF	(Italy)	Fausto Rossi	26	EU	Trapani (Italy)	Transfer	Summer	2019	Free	ucv1948.com
44	DF	(Croatia)	Hrvoje Spahija	29	EU	Voluntari	Transfer	Summer	2019	Free	ucv1948.com
28	MF	(Romania)	Alexandru Mitriță	22	EU	Pescara (Italy)	Loan	Summer	2018	—	ucv1948.com
2	DF	(Portugal)	Tiago Ferreira	24	EU	União da Madeira (Portugal)	Transfer	Summer	2020	Free	ucv1948.com
77	MF	(Romania)	Cristian Bărbuț	22	EU	ACS Poli Timișoara	Transfer	Summer	2021	€100,000	ucv1948.com
51	GK	(Switzerland)	Miodrag Mitrović	25	EU	Lugano (Switzerland)	Transfer	Summer	2021	Free	
27	DF	(Switzerland)	Ivan Martić	26	EU	Rijeka (Croatia)	Transfer	Summer	2020	Free	
20	DF	(Croatia)	Niko Datković	24	EU	Spezia (Italy)	Loan	Summer	2018	—	
4	DF	(Romania)	Răzvan Popa	20	EU	Zaragoza (Spain)	Free agent	Summer	2022	—	
17	MF	(Romania)	Ovidiu Bic	23	EU	Gaz Metan Mediaș	Transfer	Winter	2023	€205,000	ucv1948.com
14	MF	(Croatia)	Dominik Glavina	25	EU	Rudar (Slovenia)	Transfer	Winter	2018	Free	ucv1948.com
26	MF	(Portugal)	André Santos	28	EU	Arouca (Portugal)	Transfer	Winter	2018	Free	ucv1948.com
24	DF	(Romania)	Florin Gardoș	29	EU	Southampton (England)	Loan	Winter	2018	—	ucv1948.com
9	FW	(Romania)	Simon Măzărache	24	EU	Juventus București	Loan return	Winter	2018	—	
77	MF	(Romania)	Alin Manea	20	EU	Sportul Snagov	Loan return	Winter	2019	—	
9	MF	(Romania)	Stephan Drăghici	19	EU	Clinceni	Loan return	Winter	2018	—	

==== Out ====
No.	Pos.	Nat.	Name	Age	EU	Moving to	Type	Transfer window	Transfer fee	Source
9	FW	(Romania)	Andrei Ivan	20	EU	Krasnodar (Russia)	Transfer	Summer	€3,000,000	ucv1948.com
84	DF	(France)	Alexandre Barthe	31	EU	CSKA Sofia (Bulgaria)	Mutual termination	Summer	—	ucv1948.com
52	GK	(Romania)	Andrei Vlad	18	EU	Steaua București	Transfer	Summer	€400,000	steauafc.com
73	MF	(Romania)	Radu Bîrzan	17	EU	Argeș Pitești	Loan	Summer	—	
73	MF	(Romania)	Stephan Drăghici	19	EU	Juventus București	Loan	Winter	—	
80	GK	(Portugal)	Pedro Mingote	36	EU	Juventus București	Transfer	Summer	Free	
21	FW	(Bosnia and Herzegovina)	Nusmir Fajic	30	EU	Krupa (Bosnia and Herzegovina)	Mutual termination	Summer	Free	ucv1948.com
19	DF	(Romania)	Andrei Dumitraş	29	EU	Viitorul Constanța	Transfer	Summer	Free	
31	DF	(Romania)	Bogdan Bucurică	31	EU	Concordia Chiajna	Transfer	Summer	Free	
14	FW	(Croatia)	Filip Jazvic	26	EU	Arka Gdynia (Poland)	Transfer	Summer	Free	
44	DF	(Croatia)	Hrvoje Spahija	29	EU	Ordabasy (Kazakhstan)	Transfer	Winter	Free	
20	DF	(Croatia)	Niko Datković	24	EU	Spezia (Italy)	End of loan	Winter	—	

==== Overall transfer activity ====
===== Expenditure =====
Summer: ▼€229,000

Winter: ▼€945,000

Total: ▼€2,174,000

===== Income =====
Summer: ▲€3,400,000

Winter: ▲€0

Total: ▲€0

===== Net Totals =====
Summer: ▼€3,171,000

Winter: ▲€945,000

Total: ▼€2,226,000

== Friendly matches ==
Win Draw Loss

23 June 2017 Friendly	CSKA Sofia (Bulgaria)	4–2	(Romania) Universitatea Craiova	Jenbach, Austria
18:00 CEST (UTC+2)	Angelov 31'; Kolev 38', 72'; Nedyalkov 88'	Report	Ivan 2', 19'	Stadium: Jenbach Sportplatz; Attendance: 200

28 June 2017 Friendly	Ludogorets Razgrad (Bulgaria)	1–0	(Romania) Universitatea Craiova	Kirchbichl, Austria
18:00 CEST (UTC+2)	Moți 86' (pen.)	Report		Stadium: SVK Arena

7 January 2017 Friendly	Universitatea Craiova (Romania)	1–2	(Russia) Ufa	Volders, Austria
18:00 CEST (UTC+2)	Mateiu 40'	Report	Safronidi 43'; Sukhov 58'	Stadium: Volders Sports Complex; Attendance: 50

5 July 2017 Friendly	Dynamo Kyiv (Ukraine)	2–0	(Romania) Universitatea Craiova	Schwaz, Austria
19:00 CEST (UTC+2)	Mbokani 68'; Yarmolenko 74'	Report		Stadium: Silberstadt-Arena

14 January 2018 Friendly	Universitatea Craiova (Romania)	2–4	(Germany) SV Meppen	Belek, Turkey
11:00 TRT (UTC+3)	Mitriță 24'; Burlacu 74'	Report	54'; 55'; 56'; 75'	Stadium: Papillon Sports Complex

21 January 2018 Friendly	Universitatea Craiova (Romania)	1–0	(Poland) Lechia Gdańsk	Belek, Turkey
17:00 TRT (UTC+3)	Gustavo 32'	Report		Stadium: Papillon Sports Complex; Attendance: 100

25 January 2018 Friendly	Universitatea Craiova (Romania)	2–0	(Poland) Zagłębie Lubin	Belek, Turkey
15:00 TRT (UTC+3)	Bărbuț 34' 82'	Report		Stadium: Papillon Sports Complex

25 January 2018 Friendly	Universitatea Craiova (Romania)	0–2	(Bulgaria) Ludogorets Razgrad	Belek, Turkey
18:00 TRT (UTC+3)		Report	João Paulo 66' 70'	Stadium: Papillon Sports Complex

== Competitions ==
Win Draw Loss

=== Overview ===
Competition	First match	Last match	Starting round	Final position	Record							
Competition	First match	Last match	Starting round	Final position	Pld	W	D	L	GF	GA	GD	Win %
Liga I	14 July 2017	15 May 2018	Matchday 1	3rd	36	17	12	7	51	36	+15	47.22
Cupa României	24 October 2017	27 May 2018	Round of 32	Winners	6	5	0	1	14	5	+9	83.33
Europa League	27 July 2017	3 August 2017	Third round	Third round	2	0	0	2	0	3	−3	0.00
Total					44	22	12	10	65	44	+21	50.00

Last updated: 27 May 2018
Source: Competitions

=== Liga I ===
==== Regular season ====
Overall								Home						Away					
Pld	W	D	L	GF	GA	GD	Pts	W	D	L	GF	GA	GD	W	D	L	GF	GA	GD
26	14	9	3	41	26	+15	51	7	5	1	22	14	+8	7	4	2	19	12	+7

Last updated: 23 February 2018.
Source: Liga I

===== Table =====
Pos	Team	Pld	W	D	L	GF	GA	GD	Pts	Qualification
1	CFR Cluj	26	18	5	3	42	13	+29	59	Qualification for the Championship round
2	FCSB	26	16	7	3	52	18	+34	55	Qualification for the Championship round
3	Universitatea Craiova	26	14	9	3	41	26	+15	51	Qualification for the Championship round
4	Astra Giurgiu	26	12	8	6	38	27	+11	44 (Note: Astra is ahead of Viitorul on head-to-head results: Astra–Viitorul 3–1, Viitorul–Astra 1–1.)	Qualification for the Championship round
5	Viitorul Constanța	26	13	5	8	34	21	+13	44	Qualification for the Championship round

Source: LPF (in Romanian), Soccerway
Rules for classification: 1) Points; 2) Head-to-head points; 3) Head-to-head goal difference; 4) Head-to-head goals scored; 5) Goal difference; 6) Goals scored; 7) Play-off.

===== Results by round =====
Round	1	2	3	4	5	6	7	8	9	10	11	12	13	14	15	16	17	18	19	20	21	22	23	24	25	26
Ground	H	H	A	H	A	H	A	H	A	H	A	H	A	A	A	H	A	H	A	H	A	H	A	H	A	H
Result	W	D	D	D	W	W	W	W	L	D	W	D	W	W	W	L	D	W	L	W	D	W	D	W	W	D
Position	3	2	6	6	6	3	3	2	3	4	4	3	3	3	3	3	3	3	3	3	3	3	3	3	3	3

Updated to match(es) played on 23 February 2018. Source: Liga I
A = Away; H = Home; W = Win; D = Draw; L = Loss

===== Matches =====
Win Draw Loss

14 July 2017 1	Universitatea Craiova	2–0	CSM Politehnica Iași	Drobeta-Turnu Severin
21:00 EEST (UTC+3)	Băluță 42'; Gustavo 50'	Report	Platini (yellow card) 59'; Spătaru (yellow card) 69'; Sin (yellow card) 86'	Stadium: Municipal; Attendance: 4,000; Referee: Ovidiu Hațegan

22 July 2017 2	Universitatea Craiova	1–1	Concordia Chiajna	Drobeta-Turnu Severin
18:30 EEST (UTC+3)	Băluță 13' (yellow card) 55'; Zlatinski (yellow card) 32'	Report	Cristescu 23' (yellow card) 89'; Pena (yellow card) 28'; Grădinaru (yellow card) 49'; Costin (yellow card) 51'; Bălgrădean (yellow card) 90+2'	Stadium: Municipal; Attendance: 600; Referee: Lucian Rusandu

30 July 2017 3	FCSB	1–1	Universitatea Craiova	Bucharest
21:00 EEST (UTC+3)	Pintilii (yellow card) 39'; Morais (yellow card) 55'; Gnohéré 62'; Larie (yellow card) 87'; Bălașa (yellow card) 90+4'	Report	Băluță 28' (yellow card) 55'; Mitriță (yellow card) 45'; Spahija (yellow card) 61'; Gustavo (yellow card) 90'; Dimitrov (yellow card) 90+2'	Stadium: Arena Națională; Attendance: 11,500 (1,000 away fans); Referee: István Kovács

6 August 2017 4	Universitatea Craiova	1–1	Astra Giurgiu	Drobeta-Turnu Severin
18:30 EEST (UTC+3)	Kelić (yellow card) 26'; Mitriță 51' (yellow card) 74'; Barthe (yellow card) 67'; Gustavo (yellow card) 80'; Ferreira (yellow card) 90+1'	Report	Balaure 9' (yellow card) 51'; Dandea (yellow card) 26'; Erico (yellow card) 86'; Le Tallec (yellow card) 90+1'	Stadium: Municipal; Attendance: 1,000; Referee: Horațiu Feșnic

9 August 2017 5	Juventus București	0–1	Universitatea Craiova	Ploiești
19:15 EEST (UTC+3)	Călințaru (yellow card) 45+2'; Stoenac (yellow card) 65'; Băjenaru (yellow card) 88'	Report	Spahija (yellow card) 12'; Gustavo 45'	Stadium: Ilie Oană; Attendance: 600 (100 away fans); Referee: Cătălin Popa

13 August 2017 6	Universitatea Craiova	1–0	FC Botoșani	Drobeta-Turnu Severin
17:30 EEST (UTC+3)	Briceag (yellow card) 35'; Barthe (yellow card) 52'; Roman (yellow card) 69'; Zlatinski 79'	Report	Serediuc (yellow card) 53'; Bordeianu (yellow card) 56'; Roman (yellow card) 72'	Stadium: Municipal; Attendance: 1,525; Referee: István Kovács

20 August 2017 7	Viitorul Constanța	0–2	Universitatea Craiova	Ovidiu
18:30 EEST (UTC+3)	Boli (yellow card) 3'; Herea (yellow card) 9'; Coman (yellow card) 51'	Report	Dimitrov (yellow card) 9'; Mitriță 28', 71'; Spahija (yellow card) 39'; Mateiu (yellow card) 60'	Stadium: Viitorul; Attendance: 1,500 (200 away fans); Referee: Ovidiu Hațegan

25 August 2017 8	Universitatea Craiova	2–0	Gaz Metan Mediaș	Drobeta-Turnu Severin
21:00 EEST (UTC+3)	Spahija (yellow card) 14'; Mitriță (yellow card) 35'; Gustavo 56'; Burlacu 86' (yellow card) 90+2'	Report	Mitić (yellow card) 14'; Danci (yellow card) 32'; Olaru (yellow card) 46'; Sîrghi (yellow card) 83'	Stadium: Municipal; Attendance: 1,500; Referee: Marcel Bîrsan

10 September 2017 9	CFR Cluj	2–1	Universitatea Craiova	Cluj-Napoca
20:30 EEST (UTC+3)	Mureșan (yellow card) 29'; Vera (yellow card) 32'; Culio 40'; Deac 45+3'; Baldé 64'	Report	Ferreira (red card) 37'; Băluță (yellow card) 48'; Gustavo 81' (yellow card) 90+1'; Popov (yellow card) 83'; Kelić (yellow card) 89'	Stadium: Dr. Constantin Rădulescu; Referee: Adrian Comănescu

16 September 2017 10	Universitatea Craiova	2–2	Dinamo București	Drobeta-Turnu Severin
21:00 EEST (UTC+3)	Zlatinski (red card) 29'; Băluță (yellow card) 31' (goal) 75'; Burlacu (yellow card) 82' (goal) 89'; Screciu (yellow card) 87'	Report	Rivaldinho 19'; Mahlangu (yellow card) 30'; Romera (yellow card) 45'; Costache (red card) 45'; Salomão 49'; Oliva (yellow card) 84'; Penedo (yellow card) 90+2'	Stadium: Municipal; Attendance: 9,000; Referee: Ovidiu Hațegan

19 September 2017 11	Sepsi Sfântu Gheorghe	2–3	Universitatea Craiova	Brașov
21:00 EEST (UTC+3)	Hadnagy 60'; Astafei 70'	Report	Mitriță (yellow card) 7'; Burlacu 19'; Screciu (yellow card) 56'; Bancu (yellow card) 57' (goal) 80'; Gustavo 68'	Stadium: Silviu Ploeșteanu; Referee: Marius Avram

22 September 2017 12	Universitatea Craiova	1–1	FC Voluntari	Drobeta-Turnu Severin
20:30 EEST (UTC+3)	Screciu (yellow card) 42'; Băluță 69'	Report	Filipov (yellow card) 2'; Tudorie 56'; Răuță (yellow card) 90+1'	Stadium: Municipal; Attendance: 1,000; Referee: Horațiu Feșnic

29 September 2017 13	ACS Poli Timișoara	0–2	Universitatea Craiova	Timișoara
20:30 EEST (UTC+3)	Ţigănaşu (red card) 34'; Doman (yellow card) 63'	Report	Datković (yellow card) 18'; Martić 26'; Burlacu (yellow card) 85' (goal) 89'; Gustavo (yellow card) 90+2'	Stadium: Dan Păltinișanu; Referee: István Kovács

14 October 2017 14	CSM Politehnica Iași	1–2	Universitatea Craiova	Iași
19:15 EEST (UTC+3)	Cristea (yellow card) 15'; Bădic (yellow card) 24'; Sin 64'; Qaka (yellow card) 70'; Ștefănescu (yellow card) 90+3'	Report	Gustavo 16'; Mateiu (yellow card) 32'; Băluță 77' (yellow card) 86'; Calancea (yellow card) 90+3'	Stadium: Emil Alexandrescu; Referee: Cătălin Popa

20 October 2017 15	Concordia Chiajna	1–2	Universitatea Craiova	Chiajna
20:45 EEST (UTC+3)	Bucșa (yellow card) 58'; Marc 89'	Report	Briceag (yellow card) 24'; Băluță 32'; Martić 90+2' (yellow card) 90+3'	Stadium: Concordia; Referee: Marcel Bîrsan

29 October 2017 16	Universitatea Craiova	2–5	FCSB	Drobeta-Turnu Severin
20:45 EET (UTC+2)	Kelić (yellow card) 27' (goal) 72'; Larie 66' (o.g.)	Report	Gnohéré 1'; Larie (yellow card) 17'; Teixeira 33'; Tănase 62'; Kelić 69' (o.g.); Coman 83'; Pintilii (yellow card) 89'	Stadium: Municipal; Attendance: 10,000; Referee: István Kovács

3 November 2017 17	Astra Giurgiu	2–2	Universitatea Craiova	Giurgiu
20:45 EET (UTC+2)	Ioniță 8' (yellow card) 68'; Dandea (yellow card) 46' (goal) 79'; Iliev (red card) 73'	Report	Gustavo 5', 48'; Spahija (yellow card) 73'; Datković (yellow card) 90+5'	Stadium: Marin Anastasovici; Referee: Marcel Bîrsan

18 November 2017 18	Universitatea Craiova	3–1	Juventus București	Craiova
19:00 EET (UTC+2)	Mitriță 39', 45'; Martić (yellow card) 50'; Gustavo 63'; Bancu (yellow card) 89'	Report	Țîră 80'; Morariu (yellow card) 82'; Bărbulescu (yellow card) 86'	Stadium: Ion Oblemenco; Attendance: 17,854; Referee: Iulian Călin

24 November 2017 19	FC Botoșani	1–0	Universitatea Craiova	Botoșani
20:45 EET (UTC+2)	Tincu (yellow card) 4'; Roman (yellow card) 41'; Miron 45'; Popa (yellow card) 88'; Ungurușan (yellow card) 89'; Dumitraș (yellow card) 90+1'	Report	Gustavo (yellow card) 19'; Zlatinski (yellow card) 90+2'	Stadium: Municipal; Referee: Hațegan

2 December 2017 20	Universitatea Craiova	3–1	Viitorul Constanța	Craiova
20:45 EET (UTC+2)	Mitriță (yellow card) 35' (goal) 58'; Bancu 62'; Martić (yellow card) 74'; Bărbuț 77'	Report	Țîru (yellow card) 24' (yellow card) 57' (red card); Mladen (yellow card) 26'; Țucudean 42'; Băluță (yellow card) 86'	Stadium: Ion Oblemenco; Attendance: 17,763; Referee: Horațiu Feșnic

10 December 2017 21	Gaz Metan Mediaș	0–0	Universitatea Craiova	Mediaș
17:00 EET (UTC+2)	Constantin (yellow card) 63'; Chamed (yellow card) 90+6'; Danci (yellow card) 90+9'	Report		Stadium: Gaz Metan; Referee: George Rădulescu

16 December 2017 22	Universitatea Craiova	2–1	CFR Cluj	Craiova
20:30 EET (UTC+2)	Kelić (yellow card) 42'; Băluță 45' (yellow card) 65' (yellow card) 81' (red card); Alexandru Mitriță 51'; Calancea (yellow card) 73'; Bancu (yellow card) 89'	Report	Deac (yellow card) 45'; Rus (yellow card) 51'; Vera 61'	Stadium: Ion Oblemenco; Attendance: 26,834; Referee: István Kovács

4 February 2018 23	Dinamo București	2–2	Universitatea Craiova	Bucharest
20:45 EET (UTC+2)	Monroy (yellow card) 37'; Nemec 45+1'; Nedelcearu (yellow card) 57'; Popa 85'		Gustavo 22'; Bărbuț (yellow card) 51' (goal) 55'; Bancu (yellow card) 61'	Stadium: Dinamo; Attendance: 8,000 (600 away fans); Referee: Ovidiu Hațegan

11 February 2018 24	Universitatea Craiova	1–0	Sepsi Sfântu Gheorghe	Craiova
20:45 EET (UTC+2)	Zlatinski (yellow card) 24'; Ferreira (yellow card) 31'; Gustavo 62'; Mateiu (yellow card) 70'; Kelić (yellow card) 84'	Report	Viera (yellow card) 13'; Oliveira (yellow card) 24'; Petrovikj (yellow card) 85'; Fülöp (yellow card) 90+1'	Stadium: Ion Oblemenco; Attendance: 14,500; Referee: Antonie Andrei

16 February 2018 25	FC Voluntari	0–1	Universitatea Craiova	Voluntari
20:45 EET (UTC+2)	Căpățînă (yellow card) 10'; Voicu (yellow card) 72'; Cernat (yellow card) 89'	Report	Mitriță (yellow card) 17'; Bancu 33'; Popa (yellow card) 90'	Stadium: Anghel Iordănescu; Referee: Marcel Bîrsan

24 February 2018 26	Universitatea Craiova	1–1	ACS Poli Timișoara	Craiova
20:45 EET (UTC+2)	Bancu (yellow card) 42'; Dimitrov (yellow card) 16' (goal) 57'; Băluță (yellow card) 90+4'	Report	Vașvari (yellow card) 44'; Enescu 50'; Maxi Oliva (yellow card) 84'	Stadium: Ion Oblemenco; Attendance: 9,000; Referee: George Rădulescu

==== Championship round ====
Overall								Home						Away					
Pld	W	D	L	GF	GA	GD	Pts	W	D	L	GF	GA	GD	W	D	L	GF	GA	GD
10	3	3	4	10	10	0	12	2	2	1	8	5	+3	1	1	3	2	5	−3

Last updated: 20 May 2018.
Source: Liga I

===== Table =====
Pos	Team	Pld	W	D	L	GF	GA	GD	Pts	Qualification
1	CFR Cluj (C)	10	5	5	0	12	6	+6	50	Qualification for the Champions League second qualifying round
2	FCSB	10	6	3	1	14	6	+8	49	Qualification for the Europa League second qualifying round
3	Universitatea Craiova	10	3	3	4	10	10	0	38	Qualification for the Europa League third qualifying round (Note: Universitatea Craiova qualified for the Europa League third qualifying round by winning the 2017–18 Cupa României.)
4	Viitorul Constanța	10	3	4	3	13	11	+2	35	Qualification for the Europa League first qualifying round
5	Astra Giurgiu	10	3	2	5	9	11	−2	33	
6	CSM Politehnica Iași	10	1	1	8	5	19	−14	24	

Source: Soccerway, Romanian Football Federation
Rules for classification: 1) Points; 2) Points without rounding; 3) Head-to-head points; 4) Head-to-head goal difference; 5) Head-to-head goals scored; 6) Goal difference; 7) Goals scored; 8) Play-off (only if needed to decide champion or teams for UEFA competitions). (Note: only criteria 6 and 7 are applied to establish the classification during the competition.)
(C) Champions

===== Position by round =====
Round	1	2	3	4	5	6	7	8	9	10
Ground	H	A	H	A	H	A	H	A	H	A
Result	W	D	D	L	W	L	D	L	L	W
Position	3	3	3	3	3	3	3	3	4	3

Updated to match(es) played on 20 May 2018. Source: Liga I
A = Away; H = Home; W = Win; D = Draw; L = Loss

===== Matches =====
Win Draw Loss

10 March 2018 1	Universitatea Craiova	1–0	Astra Giurgiu	Craiova
20:45 EET (UTC+2)	Marius Briceag (yellow card) 27'; Kelić (yellow card) 33'; Mitriță 82'; Martić (yellow card) 90+2'	Report	Moise (yellow card) 86'; Belu (yellow card) 88'	Stadium: Ion Oblemenco; Attendance: 15,000; Referee: Alexandru Tudor

16 March 2018 2	Viitorul Constanța	0–0	Universitatea Craiova	Ovidiu
20:45 EET (UTC+2)	Ionuț Vînă (yellow card) 56' (yellow card) 82' (red card); Mladen (yellow card) 58'	Report	Burlacu (yellow card) 14'; Mitriță (yellow card) 35'; Băluță (yellow card) 72'; Martić (yellow card) 90+3'	Stadium: Viitorul; Referee: Horațiu Feșnic

31 March 2018 3	Universitatea Craiova	0–0	CFR Cluj	Craiova
20:45 EEST (UTC+3)	Kelić (yellow card) 7'; Santos (yellow card) 26'; Martić (yellow card) 84'; Bancu (yellow card) 86'	Report	Culio (yellow card) 83'	Stadium: Ion Oblemenco; Attendance: 25,000; Referee: Marius Avram

9 April 2018 4	FCSB	2–0	Universitatea Craiova	Bucharest
20:45 EEST (UTC+3)	Momčilović 6'; Popescu (yellow card) 28'; Budescu (yellow card) 36'; Tănase 51'; Man (yellow card) 73'		Mateiu (yellow card) 70'; Băluță (yellow card) 72'	Stadium: Arena Națională; Attendance: 22,800; Referee: István Kovács

14 April 2018 5	Universitatea Craiova	4–1	CSM Politehnica Iași	Craiova
20:45 EEST (UTC+3)	Mitriță 18', 45', 55'; Dimitrov 90+1'; Bancu (yellow card) 62'; Burlacu (yellow card) 77'	Report	Frăsinescu (yellow card) 17'; Mihalache (yellow card) 21'; Koșelev (yellow card) 29'; Danale 72'	Stadium: Ion Oblemenco; Attendance: 10,000; Referee: Radu Petrescu

23 April 2018 6	Astra Giurgiu	1–0	Universitatea Craiova	Giurgiu
20:45 EEST (UTC+3)	Bejan (yellow card) 34'; Radunović (yellow card) 63'; Seto (yellow card) 74' (goal) 79'		Santos (yellow card) 12'; Burlacu (yellow card) 35'; Zlatinski (yellow card) 90+2'	Stadium: Marin Anastasovici; Referee: Cătălin Popa

28 April 2018 7	Universitatea Craiova	3–3	Viitorul Constanța	Craiova
20:45 EEST (UTC+3)	Mitriță 24' (yellow card) 53'; Băluță 45', 57'	Report	Cicâldău 15'; de Nooijer (yellow card) 31'; Ganea 46', 55'; Hodorogea (yellow card) 62'	Stadium: Ion Oblemenco; Attendance: 14,000; Referee: Andrei Chivulete

5 May 2018 8	CFR Cluj	1–0	Universitatea Craiova	Cluj-Napoca
20:45 EEST (UTC+3)	Țucudean (yellow card) 9'; Mailat (yellow card) 27'; Culio (yellow card) 60'; Camora 76'; Boli (yellow card) 83'		Mateiu (yellow card) 15'; Mitriță (yellow card) 61'; Gustavo (yellow card) 70'	Stadium: Dr. Constantin Rădulescu; Referee: Marius Avram

14 May 2018 9	Universitatea Craiova	0–1	FCSB	Craiova
20:45 EEST (UTC+3)	Băluță (yellow card) 26'; Popa (yellow card) 45'; Bancu (yellow card) 52'; Ferreira (yellow card) 55'; Zlatinski (yellow card) 56'; Kelić (yellow card) 90+6'		Popescu (yellow card) 31'; Coman (yellow card) 35'; Morais (yellow card) 64' (yellow-red card) 90+6'; Teixeira (yellow card) 74'; Teixeira 86'; Pintilii (red card) 90+1'; Tănase (yellow card) 90+6'; Bălgrădean (yellow card) 90+7'	Stadium: Ion Oblemenco; Attendance: 29,000; Referee: Ovidiu Hațegan

20 May 2018 10	CSM Politehnica Iași	1–2	Universitatea Craiova	Iași
20:45 EEST (UTC+3)	Kizito 16'; Jô (yellow card) 66'; Frăsinescu (yellow card) 75'	Report	Mateiu 28'; Băluță 35' (yellow card) 87'; Zlatinski (yellow card) 39'; Martić (yellow card) 40'; Glavina (yellow card) 45+3'	Stadium: Emil Alexandrescu; Attendance: 2,000; Referee: George Rădulescu

=== Cupa României ===
24 October 2017 Round of 32	Sepsi Sfântu Gheorghe	0–2	Universitatea Craiova	Brașov
20:30 EET (UTC+2)		Report	Mitriță 27'; Băluță 88'	Stadium: Silviu Ploeșteanu; Attendance: 3,400; Referee: Andrei Chivulete (Bucharest)

28 November 2017 Round of 16	Afumați	2–3 (a.e.t.)	Universitatea Craiova	Ploiești
18:00 EET (UTC+2)	Burlacu 10'; Vlada 93'	Report	Gustavo 66'; Băluță 101', 105'	Stadium: Ilie Oană; Attendance: 460; Referee: Florin Andrei (Târgu Mureș)

6 March 2018 Quarter-finals	Universitatea Craiova	1–0	Dinamo București	Craiova
17:00 EET (UTC+2)	Bancu 56'	Report		Stadium: Ion Oblemenco; Attendance: 26,000; Referee: Horațiu Feșnic (Cluj-Napoca)

19 April 2018 Semi-finals	Universitatea Craiova	5–1	FC Botoșani	Craiova
20:30 EEST (UTC+3)	Băluță 12', 30', 82' (yellow card) 84'; Gustavo 45+4'; Băluță 65'; Gardoș (yellow card) 78'		Acsinte 35'; Miron (yellow card) 45+2'; Mihai Roman (yellow card) 67'	Stadium: Ion Oblemenco; Attendance: 20,000; Referee: Horațiu Feșnic (Cluj-Napoca)

9 May 2018 Semi-finals	FC Botoșani	2–1	Universitatea Craiova	Botoșani
17:00 EEST (UTC+3)	Mircea Axente 13'; Burcă (yellow card) 26'; Rodríguez (yellow card) 56'; Roman (yellow card) 64'; Golubović 66'; Plămadă (yellow card) 72'	Report	Mitrović (yellow card) 35'; Popa (yellow card) 52'; Briceag (yellow card) 59'; Mitriță 61'	Stadium: Municipal; Referee: Marcel Bîrsan, (Bucharest)

27 May 2018 Final	Universitatea Craiova	2–0	Hermannstadt	Bucharest
21:00 EEST (UTC+3)	Popa (yellow card) 2'; Gustavo 30'; Zlatinski (yellow card) 42'; Bancu (yellow card) 55'; Mitriță 58'; Kelić (yellow card) 61'; Băluță (yellow card) 73'		Stoica (yellow card) 26'; Hergheligiu (yellow card) 61'; Crișan (yellow card) 71'; Coman (yellow card) 73'; Boboc (yellow card) 78'	Stadium: Arena Națională; Attendance: 30,642; Referee: Marcel Bîrsan; Man of the Match: Alexandru Mitriță

=== UEFA Europa League ===
==== Third qualifying round ====
27 July 2017 First leg	Universitatea Craiova (Romania)	0–1	(Italy) Milan	Drobeta-Turnu Severin, Romania
20:00 CEST (UTC+02:00)	Briceag (yellow card) 90+2'	Report	Rodríguez 44'; Kessié (yellow card) 77'	Stadium: Stadionul Municipal; Attendance: 20,000; Referee: Halis Özkahya (Turkey)

3 August 2017 Second leg	Milan (Italy)	2–0 (3–0 agg.)	(Romania) Universitatea Craiova	Milan, Italy
20:45 CEST (UTC+02:00)	Bonaventura 9'; Rodríguez (yellow card) 45'; Cutrone 52'; Zapata (yellow card) 62'	Report	Băluță (yellow card) 49'	Stadium: San Siro; Attendance: 65,763; Referee: Nikola Popov (Bulgaria)

== Statistics ==
=== Appearances and goals ===
As of 5 February 2018

No.	Pos	Player	Liga I		Cupa României		Europa League		Total	
No.	Pos	Player	Apps	Goals	Apps	Goals	Apps	Goals	Apps	Goals
1	GK	(Moldova) Nicolae Calancea	21	0	1	0	2	0	24	0
2	DF	(Portugal) Tiago Ferreira	13 + 1	0	1	0	1	0	16	0
3	DF	(Romania) Marius Briceag	16 + 3	0	2	0	1	0	22	0
4	DF	(Romania) Răzvan Popa	0 + 4	0	1	0	0	0	5	0
5	MF	(Romania) Vladimir Screciu	17 + 3	0	2	0	0	0	22	0
6	DF	(Croatia) Renato Kelić	15 + 1	1	1	0	2	0	19	1
7	MF	(Brazil) Gustavo	18 + 4	10	1	1	2	0	25	11
8	MF	(Romania) Alexandru Mateiu	17 + 1	0	2	0	0 + 2	0	22	0
10	MF	(Romania) Alexandru Băluță	19	8	2	3	2	0	23	11
11	MF	(Romania) Nicușor Bancu	20 + 3	2	1	0	2	0	26	2
16	FW	(Romania) Jovan Marković	0	0	0	0	0	0	0	0
17	MF	(Romania) Ovidiu Bic	0 + 1	0	0	0	0	0	1	0
18	DF	(Bulgaria) Apostol Popov	2 + 2	0	0	0	0	0	4	0
20	DF	(Croatia) Niko Datković	10	0	1	0	0	0	11	0
21	MF	(Italy) Fausto Rossi	2 + 3	0	0	0	2	0	7	0
23	MF	(Bulgaria) Hristo Zlatinski	16 + 1	1	1	0	2	0	20	1
27	DF	(Switzerland) Ivan Martić	13	2	0	0	0	0	13	2
28	MF	(Romania) Alexandru Mitriță	17 + 1	7	1	1	2	0	21	8
30	DF	(Bulgaria) Radoslav Dimitrov	10 + 3	0	2	0	2	0	17	0
36	FW	(Romania) Andrei Burlacu	8 + 10	4	1	0	0	0	19	4
38	FW	(Romania) Alexandru Popescu	0 + 1	0	0	0	0	0	1	0
40	DF	(Romania) Robert Petre	0	0	0	0	0	0	0	0
41	DF	(Romania) Remus Enache	0	0	0	0	0	0	0	0
43	MF	(Romania) Lucian Buzan	0 + 1	0	0	0	0	0	1	0
44	DF	(Croatia) Hrvoje Spahija	8 + 1	0	2	0	2	0	13	0
45	MF	(Romania) Raul Hreniuc	0	0	0	0	0	0	0	0
46	FW	(Romania) Valentin Mihăilă	0	0	1	0	0	0	1	0
49	GK	(Romania) Laurențiu Popescu	0	0	0	0	0	0	0	0
50	GK	(Romania) Cristian Dică	0	0	0	0	0	0	0	0
51	GK	(Switzerland) Miodrag Mitrović	2	0	1	0	0	0	3	0
70	FW	(Romania) Mihai Roman	6 + 11	0	2	0	0 + 2	0	21	0
77	MF	(Romania) Cristian Bărbuț	2 + 6	2	2	0	0 + 2	0	12	2
Players transferred out during the season
9	FW	(Romania) Andrei Ivan	1	0	0	0	0	0	1	0

=== Goalscorers ===
As of 5 February 2018

Rank	Position	Name	Liga I	Cupa României	Europa League	Total
1	MF	(Romania) Alexandru Băluță	8	3	0	11
2	MF	(Brazil) Gustavo	10	1	0	11
3	MF	(Romania) Alexandru Mitriță	7	1	0	8
4	FW	(Romania) Andrei Burlacu	4	0	0	4
5	MF	(Romania) Nicușor Bancu	2	0	0	2
5	DF	(Switzerland) Ivan Martić	2	0	0	2
5	MF	(Romania) Cristian Bărbuț	2	0	0	2
7	DF	(Croatia) Renato Kelić	1	0	0	1
7	MF	(Bulgaria) Hristo Zlatinski	1	0	0	1
Own goal			1	0	0	1
Total			36	5	0	41

=== Clean sheets ===
As of 16 March 2018

Rank	Name	Liga I	Cupa României	Europa League	Total
1	(Moldova) Nicolae Calancea	7	1	0	8
2	(Switzerland) Miodrag Mitrović	4	1	0	5
Total		11	2	0	13

=== Disciplinary record ===
As of 6 February 2018

Rank	Position	Name	Liga I			Cupa României			Europa League			Total		
Rank	Position	Name	Booked	(yellow card) (yellow-red card)	Sent off (straight red)	Booked	(yellow card) (yellow-red card)	Sent off (straight red)	Booked	(yellow card) (yellow-red card)	Sent off (straight red)	Booked	(yellow card) (yellow-red card)	Sent off (straight red)
1	MF	(Romania) Alexandru Băluță	6	1	0	0	0	0	1	0	0	7	1	0
3	MF	(Romania) Alexandru Mitriță	5	0	0	0	0	0	0	0	0	5	0	0
3	DF	(Croatia) Hrvoje Spahija	5	0	0	0	0	0	0	0	0	5	0	0
3	MF	(Brazil) Gustavo	5	0	0	0	0	0	0	0	0	5	0	0
5	DF	(Croatia) Renato Kelić	4	0	0	0	0	0	0	0	0	4	0	0
5	MF	(Romania) Nicușor Bancu	4	0	0	0	0	0	0	0	0	4	0	0
7	FW	(Romania) Andrei Burlacu	3	0	0	0	0	0	0	0	0	3	0	0
7	MF	(Romania) Vladimir Screciu	3	0	0	0	0	0	0	0	0	3	0	0
7	DF	(Switzerland) Ivan Martić	3	0	0	0	0	0	0	0	0	3	0	0
7	DF	(Romania) Marius Briceag	2	0	0	0	0	0	1	0	0	3	0	0
7	MF	(Bulgaria) Hristo Zlatinski	2	1	0	0	0	0	0	0	0	2	1	0
12	DF	(Bulgaria) Radoslav Dimitrov	2	0	0	0	0	0	0	0	0	2	0	0
12	DF	(France) Alexandre Barthe	2	0	0	0	0	0	0	0	0	2	0	0
12	MF	(Romania) Alexandru Mateiu	2	0	0	0	0	0	0	0	0	2	0	0
12	DF	(Croatia) Niko Datković	2	0	0	0	0	0	0	0	0	2	0	0
12	GK	(Moldova) Nicolae Calancea	2	0	0	0	0	0	0	0	0	2	0	0
12	DF	(Portugal) Tiago Ferreira	1	0	1	0	0	0	0	0	0	1	0	1
18	FW	(Romania) Mihai Roman	1	0	0	0	0	0	0	0	0	1	0	0
18	DF	(Bulgaria) Apostol Popov	1	0	0	0	0	0	0	0	0	1	0	0
18	MD	(Romania) Cristian Bărbuț	1	0	0	0	0	0	0	0	0	1	0	0
Total			56	1	1	0	0	0	2	0	0	58	1	1

=== Attendances ===
As of match played 16 March 2018

	Matches	Attendances	Average	High	Low
Liga I	18	210,576	11,699	29,000	600
Cupa României	1	26,000	26,000	26,000	26,000
Europa League	1	20,000	20,000	20,000	20,000
Total	20	256,576	12,828	29,000	600

== See also ==
- 2017–18 Cupa României
- 2017–18 Liga I
- 2017–18 UEFA Europa League
