= 2018 Cupa României final =

- Event: 2017–18 Cupa României
Hermannstadt	Universitatea Craiova
0	2
- Date: 27 May 2018
- Venue: Arena Națională, Bucharest
- Referee: Marcel Bîrsan
- Attendance: 30,642
- Weather: Clear

The 2018 Cupa României final was the final match of the 2017–18 Cupa României and the 80th final of the Cupa României, Romania's premier football cup competition. It was played on 27 May 2018 between Hermannstadt and Universitatea Craiova.

Hermannstadt reached their first ever cup final in the third year of the club's existence. They are the 14th team, and the first in 36 years, to reach the final while not playing in the top league.

This was the first final for Universitatea since 1991, and the first for a team from Craiova in 18 years.

The winner qualified for the 2018–19 UEFA Europa League. They also earned the right to play against 2017–18 Liga I champions for the 2018 Supercupa României.

The game was hosted by the Arena Națională stadium in Bucharest.

== Route to the final ==
Hermannstadt		Round	Universitatea Craiova
Opponent	Results		Opponent	Results
Industria Galda	3–1 (A)	Fourth Round	N/A	N/A
Voluntari	1–0 (a.e.t.) (H)	Last 32	Sepsi Sfântu Gheorghe	2–0 (A)
Juventus București	2–0 (H)	Last 16	Afumați	3–2 (a.e.t.) (A)
FCSB	3–0 (H)	Quarter-finals	Dinamo București	1–0 (H)
Gaz Metan Mediaș	1–0 (H) and 3–2 (A)	Semi-finals	Botoșani	5–1 (H) and 1–2 (A)

== Match ==
27 May 2018
21:00 EEST (UTC+3)

Hermannstadt (2)	0–2	Universitatea Craiova (1)
		Gustavo 30'; Mitriță 58'

Arena Națională, Bucharest
Attendance: 30,642
Referee: Marcel Bîrsan (Bucharest)

Hermannstadt	Universitatea Craiova

GK	1	(Romania) Cătălin Căbuz
RB	91	(Romania) Alexandru Coman	(yellow card) 73'
CB	27	(Romania) Radu Crișan	(yellow card) 71'
CB	4	(Romania) Ionuț Stoica	(yellow card) 26'
LB	17	(Romania) Daniel Tătar
DM	5	(Romania) Răzvan Dâlbea (c)		(substituted off) 64'
DM	15	(Romania) Robert Boboc	(yellow card) 78'
RM	14	(Romania) Andrei Hergheligiu	(yellow card) 61'	(substituted off) 69'
AM	90	(Romania) Bogdan Rusu
LM	7	(Romania) Petrișor Petrescu
FW	89	(Romania) Ștefan Blănaru		(substituted off) 77'
Substitutes:
AM	8	(Romania) Alexandru Curtean		(substituted in) 64'
AM	10	(Romania) Cosmin Neagu		(substituted in) 69'
CM	44	(Romania) Lucian Dumitriu		(substituted in) 77'
Manager:
(Romania) Alexandru Pelici

GK	51	(Switzerland) Miodrag Mitrović
CB	2	(Portugal) Tiago Ferreira
CB	4	(Romania) Răzvan Popa	(yellow card) 2'
CB	6	(Croatia) Renato Kelić	(yellow card) 61'
RM	27	(Switzerland) Ivan Martić
CM	8	(Romania) Alexandru Mateiu
CM	23	(Bulgaria) Hristo Zlatinski (c)	(yellow card) 42'
LM	11	(Romania) Nicușor Bancu	(yellow card) 55'
RW	7	(Brazil) Gustavo		(substituted off) 74'
FW	10	(Romania) Alexandru Băluță	(yellow card) 73'	(substituted off) 90'
LW	28	(Romania) Alexandru Mitriță		(substituted off) 84'
Substitutes:
FW	14	(Croatia) Dominik Glavina		(substituted in) 74'
LW	36	(Romania) Andrei Burlacu		(substituted in) 84'
RM	30	(Bulgaria) Radoslav Dimitrov		(substituted in) 90'
Manager:
(Italy) Devis Mangia

MAN OF THE MATCH

- (Romania) Alexandru Mitriță

MATCH OFFICIALS

- Assistant referees:
  - Radu Ghinguleac
  - Ciprian Danșa
- Fourth official:
  - Cătălin Popa
- Additional assistant referees:

MATCH RULES

- 90 minutes.
- 30 minutes of extra-time if necessary.
- Penalty shoot-out if scores still level.
- Seven named substitutes.
- Maximum of three substitutions.
