= Alexandru Olteanu =

Romanian professional footballer

Personal information
- Full name: Alexandru Constantin Olteanu
- Date of birth: 5 April 2000 (age 26)
- Place of birth: Craiova, Romania
- Height: 1.79 m (5 ft 10 in)
- Position: Defender

Team information
- Current team: Universitatea Craiova
- Number: 34

Youth career
- 2013–2015: Universitatea Craiova
- 2015–2017: FC Emmen
- 2018: ACV
- 2018: SV Meppen
- 2018–2019: Universitatea Craiova

Senior career*
| Years | Team | Apps | (Gls) |
| 2020– | Universitatea Craiova | 1 | (0) |
- * Club domestic league appearances and goals as of 8 November 2020

Alexandru Constantin Olteanu (born 5 April 2000) is a Romanian professional footballer who plays as a defender for CS Universitatea Craiova.

== Honours ==
Universitatea Craiova

- Cupa României: 2020–21
- Supercupa României: 2021
