= Vladimir Screciu =

Romanian footballer

- Screciu with Universitatea Craiova in 2025

Personal information
- Full name: Vladimir Ionuț Screciu
- Date of birth: 13 January 2000 (age 26)
- Place of birth: Corabia, Romania
- Height: 1.80 m (5 ft 11 in)
- Positions: Defensive midfielder; centre-back

Team information
- Current team: Universitatea Craiova
- Number: 6

Youth career
- 2010–2011: CSȘ Corabia
- 2011–2013: FC U Craiova
- 2013–2016: Universitatea Craiova

Senior career*
| Years | Team | Apps | (Gls) |
| 2016–2018 | Universitatea Craiova | 38 | (0) |
| 2018–2020 | Genk | 0 | (0) |
| 2020 | → Lommel (loan) | 2 | (0) |
| 2020– | Universitatea Craiova | 193 | (3) |

International career^{‡}
| 2016 | Romania U16 | 3 | (0) |
| 2016 | Romania U17 | 3 | (0) |
| 2017–2019 | Romania U19 | 8 | (0) |
| 2017–2023 | Romania U21 | 13 | (0) |
| 2023– | Romania | 11 | (0) |
- * Club domestic league appearances and goals as of 1 November 2026 ‡ National team caps and goals as of 17 November 2026

Vladimir Ionuț Screciu (Romanian pronunciation: [vladiˈmir joˈnut͡s ˈskret͡ʃju]; born 13 January 2000) is a Romanian professional footballer who plays as a defensive midfielder or a centre-back for Liga I club Universitatea Craiova and the Romania national team.

== Club career ==
=== Early career and Universitatea Craiova ===
Born in Corabia, Olt County, Screciu began his career with local CSȘ Corabia in 2010. The following year he joined the youth setup of FC Universitatea Craiova, and in 2013 moved to CS Universitatea Craiova. On 2 October 2016, 16-year-old Screciu was handed his Liga I debut by head coach Gheorghe Mulțescu, entering in the 82nd minute of a 1–2 away loss to FC Steaua București.

In April 2017, Portuguese newspaper O Jogo reported that Benfica showed interest in signing the player. He was an unused substitute in the 2018 Cupa României Final on 27 May, as the Alb-albaștrii won 2–0 over Hermannstadt. During his first spell at the club, Screciu amassed 44 appearances in all competitions.

=== Genk ===
On 19 June 2018, Genk announced the signing of Screciu on a three-year contract with the option of another year. The Belgian team paid a rumoured fee of €2 million plus bonuses for the transfer.

=== Return to Universitatea Craiova ===
Screciu dealt with injuries during his spell in Belgium, and returned to Universitatea Craiova in 2021.

== Style of play ==
Screciu plays primarily as a central or a defensive midfielder, but can also operate as a central defender.

== Career statistics ==
=== Club ===
As of 5 November 2026

Appearances and goals by club, season and competition
| Club | Season | League | | | Național cup (Note: Includes Cupa României.) | | Europe | | Other | | Total | |
| Club | Season | Division | Apps | Goals | Apps | Goals | Apps | Goals | Apps | Goals | Apps | Goals |
|---|---|---|---|---|---|---|---|---|---|---|---|---|
| Universitatea Craiova | 2016–17 | Liga I | 13 | 0 | 3 | 0 | — | | 0 | 0 | 16 | 0 |
| Universitatea Craiova | 2017–18 | Liga I | 25 | 0 | 3 | 0 | 0 | 0 | — | | 28 | 0 |
| Universitatea Craiova | Total | | 38 | 0 | 6 | 0 | 0 | 0 | 0 | 0 | 44 | 0 |
| Genk | 2019–20 | Belgian Pro League | 0 | 0 | 0 | 0 | 0 | 0 | 0 | 0 | 0 | 0 |
| Lommel (loan) | 2019–20 | Belgian First Division B | 2 | 0 | 0 | 0 | — | | — | | 2 | 0 |
| Universitatea Craiova | 2020–21 | Liga I | 16 | 0 | 4 | 1 | 1 (Note: Appearance in UEFA Europa League) | 0 | — | | 21 | 1 |
| Universitatea Craiova | 2021–22 | Liga I | 36 | 0 | 4 | 0 | 1 (Note: Appearances in UEFA Conference League) | 0 | 2 (Note: One appearance in Supercupa României, one appearance in Liga I play-offs for UEFA Conference League) | 0 | 43 | 0 |
| Universitatea Craiova | 2022–23 | Liga I | 36 | 0 | 2 | 1 | 6 | 0 | — | | 44 | 1 |
| Universitatea Craiova | 2023–24 | Liga I | 25 | 1 | 2 | 0 | — | | 0 | 0 | 27 | 1 |
| Universitatea Craiova | 2024–25 | Liga I | 31 | 0 | 2 | 0 | 0 | 0 | — | | 33 | 0 |
| Universitatea Craiova | 2025–26 | Liga I | 36 | 1 | 4 | 0 | 9 | 0 | — | | 49 | 1 |
| Universitatea Craiova | 2026–27 | Liga I | 13 | 1 | 0 | 0 | 9 (Note: Two appearances in UEFA Champions League, four appearances in UEFA Europa League, three appearances in UEFA Conference League) | 0 | 1 (Note: Appearance in Supercupa României) | 0 | 23 | 1 |
| Universitatea Craiova | Total | | 193 | 3 | 18 | 2 | 26 | 0 | 3 | 0 | 240 | 5 |
| Career total | | | 233 | 3 | 24 | 2 | 26 | 0 | 3 | 0 | 286 | 5 |

=== International ===
As of match played 17 November 2026

Appearances and goals by national team and year
| National team | Year | Apps | Goals |
|---|---|---|---|
| Romania | 2023 | 4 | 0 |
| Romania | 2024 | 0 | 0 |
| Romania | 2025 | 2 | 0 |
| Romania | 2026 | 5 | 0 |
| Total | | 11 | 0 |

== Honours ==
Universitatea Craiova

- Liga I: 2025–26
- Cupa României: 2017–18, 2020–21, 2025–26
- Supercupa României: 2021, 2026
