= Alexandru Băluță =

Romanian footballer (born 1993)

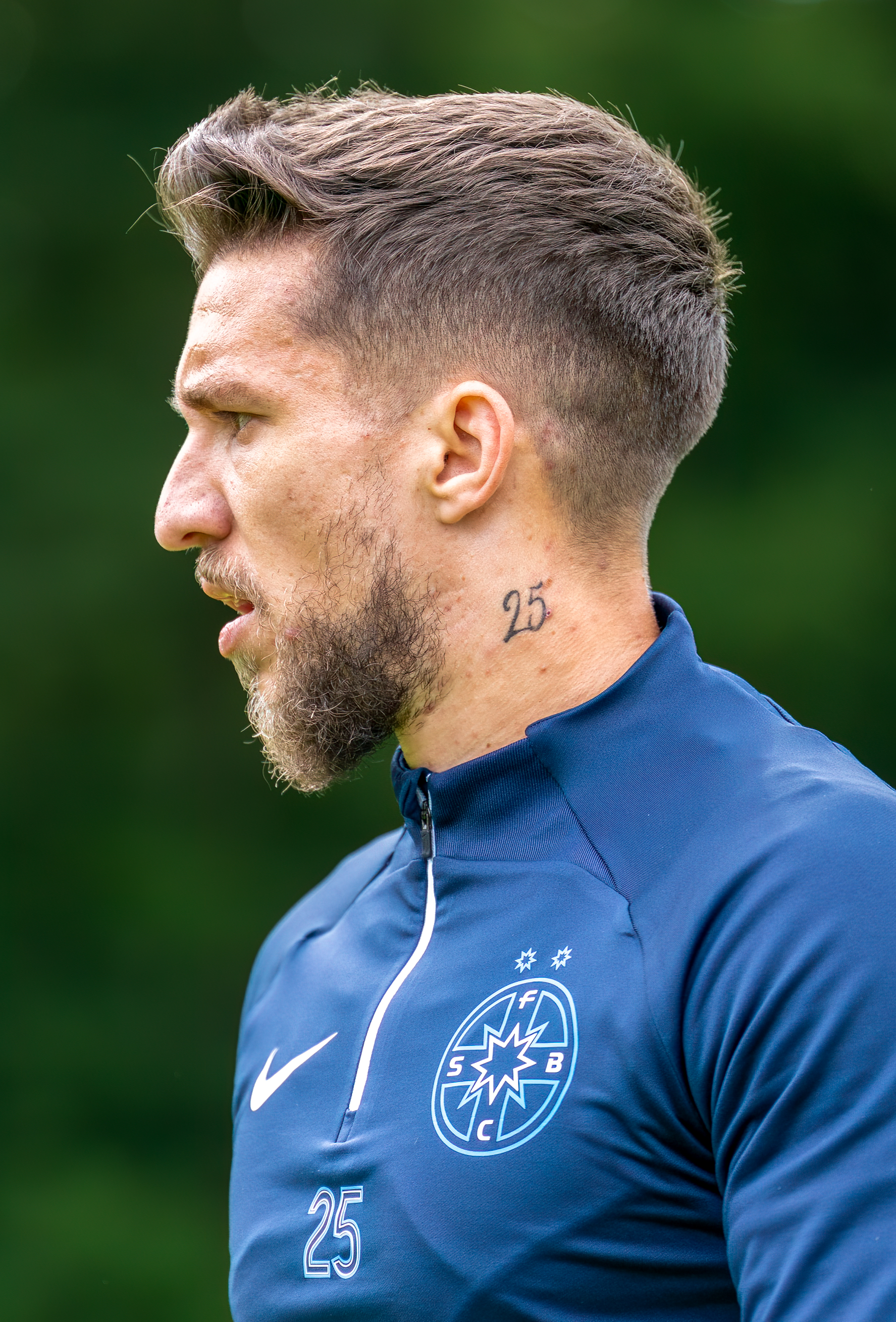
- Băluță training for FCSB in 2023

Personal information
- Full name: Alexandru Mihail Băluță
- Date of birth: 13 September 1993 (age 33)
- Place of birth: Craiova, Romania
- Height: 1.66 m (5 ft 5 in)
- Positions: Attacking midfielder; forward

Team information
- Current team: Chindia Târgoviște
- Number: 7

Youth career
- 2001–2010: Școala de Fotbal Gheorghe Popescu

Senior career*
Years	Team	Apps	(Gls)
2010–2013	Chindia Târgoviște	44	(14)
2013–2014	Viitorul Constanța	25	(3)
2014–2018	Universitatea Craiova	124	(21)
2018–2020	Slavia Prague	23	(3)
2019–2020	→ Slovan Liberec (loan)	21	(4)
2020–2023	Puskás Akadémia	72	(13)
2023–2025	FCSB	58	(9)
2025	Los Angeles FC	1	(0)
2025	→ Los Angeles FC 2 (loan)	1	(0)
2026	Boluspor	8	(0)
2026–	Chindia Târgoviște	13	(5)

International career^{‡}
2010–2011	Romania U17	6	(3)
2012–2014	Romania U21	2	(0)
2017–2021	Romania	8	(1)
- * Club domestic league appearances and goals as of 5 November 2026 ‡ National team caps and goals as of 6 June 2021

Alexandru Mihail Băluță (Romanian pronunciation: [alekˈsandru mihaˈil bəˈlutsə]; born 13 September 1993) is a Romanian professional footballer who plays as an attacking midfielder or a forward for Liga II club Chindia Târgoviște..

== Club career ==
=== Early career ===
Băluță started his senior career at Chindia Târgoviște in 2011, making 44 appearances and scoring 14 goals in the second division over the course of two seasons.

In 2013, Băluță signed with Viitorul Constanța. He played his first Liga I game on 5 August, a goalless draw against Dinamo București.

=== Universitatea Craiova ===
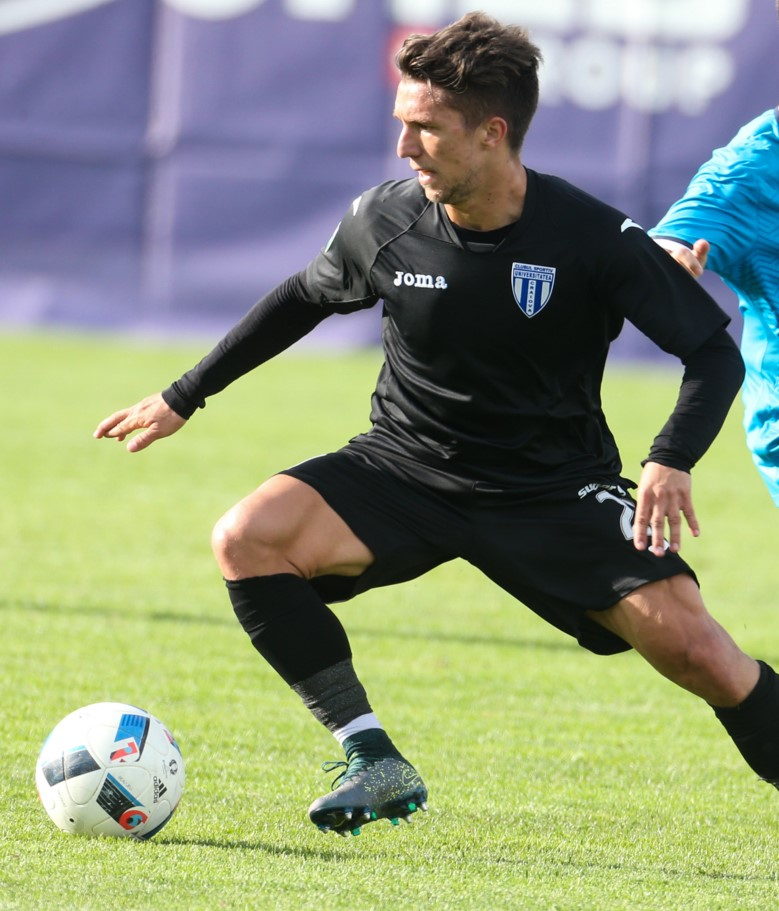
Băluță with Universitatea Craiova in a friendly against Zenit Saint Petersburg, July 2016.

Băluță moved to Universitatea Craiova for €200,000 in the summer of 2014. He made his competitive debut for the Alb-albaștrii in a Cupa Ligii match with Rapid București on 16 July, featuring the full 90 minutes in the 0–1 away loss. Băluță scored his first goal in a Cupa României 2–1 extra time victory over his former club Viitorul, on 29 October 2014.

In the summer of 2017, Băluță changed his squad number from 22 to 10, previously worn by Gustavo Vagenin who also switched to number 7. In August that year, Craiova refused to negotiate with FC Steaua București for the transfer of the player.

On 19 April 2018, Băluță netted the first hat-trick of his professional career, contributing to a 5–1 home success against FC Botoșani for the season's Cupa României. In the final on 27 May, he offered an assist to Alexandru Mitriță as Universitatea Craiova won 2–0 against Hermannstadt.

=== Slavia Prague ===
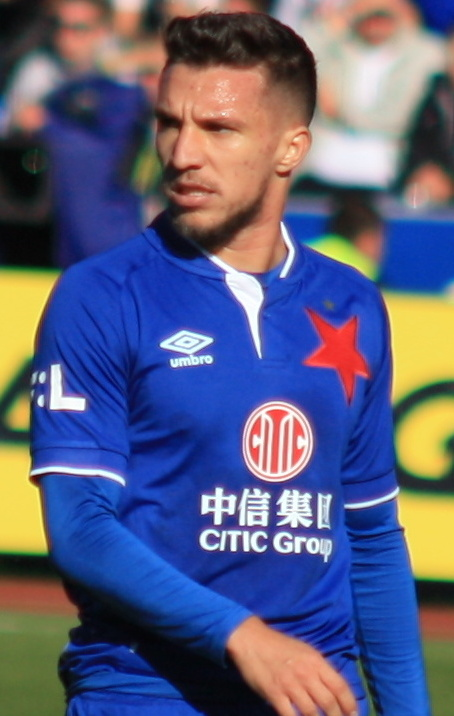
Băluță playing for Slavia Prague against Baník Ostrava, September 2018.

On 22 June 2018, Băluță signed a four-year contract with Czech team Slavia Prague, being assigned the number 20 shirt. Press reported the transfer fee at €3 million.

=== Puskás Akadémia ===
On 31 July 2020, Băluță signed a three-year contract with Hungarian team Puskás Akadémia.

=== Los Angeles FC ===
On 26 August 2025, Băluță signed as a free agent with Los Angeles FC for the remainder of the 2025 MLS season with a club option for 2026.

== International career ==
Băluță made his senior debut for the Romania national team on 13 June 2017, coming on as a 66th-minute substitute for Bogdan Stancu and scoring the winner in a 3–2 victory over Chile.

== Style of play ==
Typically deployed as an attacking midfielder or a winger, Băluță is also capable of playing as a false 9.

== Personal life ==
Băluță's father, Dumitru, was also a footballer and played in Romania for Pandurii Târgu Jiu, Argeș Pitești, and Jiul Petroșani, and in Hungary for Kecskemét.

== Career statistics ==
=== Club ===
As of match played 5 November 2026

Appearances and goals by club, season and competition
Club	Season	League			National cup (Note: Includes Cupa României, Czech Cup, Magyar Kupa)		League cup (Note: Includes Cupa Ligii)		Continental		Other		Total	
Club	Season	Division	Apps	Goals	Apps	Goals	Apps	Goals	Apps	Goals	Apps	Goals	Apps	Goals
Chindia Târgoviște	2011–12	Liga II	22	7	0	0	—		—		—		22	7
Chindia Târgoviște	2012–13	Liga II	22	7	1	0	—		—		—		22	7
Chindia Târgoviște	Total		44	14	1	0	—		—		—		45	14
Viitorul Constanța	2013–14	Liga I	25	3	3	0	—		—		—		28	3
Universitatea Craiova	2014–15	Liga I	30	2	3	1	1	0	—		—		34	3
Universitatea Craiova	2015–16	Liga I	33	4	1	0	0	0	—		—		34	4
Universitatea Craiova	2016–17	Liga I	31	4	3	0	1	0	—		—		35	4
Universitatea Craiova	2017–18	Liga I	30	11	6	6	—		2 (Note: Appearances in UEFA Europa League)	0	—		38	17
Universitatea Craiova	Total		124	21	13	7	2	0	2	0	—		141	28
Slavia Prague	2018–19	Czech First League	22	3	4	1	—		6 (Note: Two appearances in UEFA Champions League, four appearances in UEFA Europa League)	0	—		32	4
Slavia Prague	2019–20	Czech First League	1	0	—		—		0	0	1 (Note: Appearance in Czech-Slovak Supercup)	0	2	0
Slavia Prague	Total		23	3	4	1	—		6	0	1	0	34	4
Slovan Liberec (loan)	2019–20	Czech First League	21	4	4	1	—		—		—		25	5
Puskás Akadémia	2020–21	Nemzeti Bajnokság I	25	4	3	2	—		0	0	—		28	6
Puskás Akadémia	2021–22	Nemzeti Bajnokság I	25	7	2	0	—		3 (Note: Appearances in UEFA Europa Conference League)	0	—		30	7
Puskás Akadémia	2022–23	Nemzeti Bajnokság I	22	2	3	0	—		2	0	—		27	2
Puskás Akadémia	Total		72	13	8	2	—		5	0	—		85	15
FCSB	2023–24	Liga I	32	6	2	1	—		2	0	—		36	7
FCSB	2024–25	Liga I	26	3	1	1	—		17 (Note: Six appearances and one goal in UEFA Champions League, eleven appearances and one goal in UEFA Europa League)	2	1	0	45	6
FCSB	Total		58	9	3	2	—		19	2	1	0	81	13
Los Angeles FC	2025	Major League Soccer	1	0	—		—		—		0	0	1	0
Los Angeles FC 2	2025	MLS Next Pro	1	0	—		—		—		—		1	0
Boluspor	2025–26	TFF 1. Lig	8	0	0	0	—		—		—		8	0
Chindia Târgoviște	2026–27	Liga II	13	5	2	0	—		—		—		15	5
Career total			390	72	38	13	2	0	32	2	2	0	464	87

=== International ===
As of match played 6 June 2021

Appearances and goals by national team and year
National team	Year	Apps	Goals
Romania
Romania	2017	4	1
Romania	2018	1	0
Romania	2019	0	0
Romania	2020	2	0
Romania	2021	1	0
Total		8	1

Scores and results list Romania's goal tally first, score column indicates score after each Băluță goal.

International goals by date, venue, cap, opponent, score, result and competition
No.	Date	Venue	Cap	Opponent	Score	Result	Competition
1	13 June 2017	Cluj Arena, Cluj-Napoca, Romania	1	Chile	3–2	3–2	Friendly

== Honours ==
Chindia Târgoviște

- Liga III: 2010–11

Universitatea Craiova

- Cupa României: 2017–18

Slavia Prague

- Czech First League: 2018–19
- Czech Cup: 2018–19

FCSB

- Liga I: 2023–24, 2024–25
- Supercupa României: 2024

Individual

- Digi Sport Liga I Player of the Month: July 2017
