= Marius Briceag =

Romanian footballer

Personal information
- Full name: Marius Ionuţ Briceag
- Date of birth: 6 April 1992 (age 34)
- Place of birth: Pitești, Romania
- Height: 1.75 m (5 ft 9 in)
- Position: Left-back

Team information
- Current team: Chindia Târgoviște
- Number: 5

Youth career
- 2005–2010: Argeș Pitești

Senior career*
Years	Team	Apps	(Gls)
2010–2013	Argeș Pitești	67	(0)
2013–2014	CSM Râmnicu Vâlcea	44	(1)
2015–2020	Universitatea Craiova	68	(1)
2015–2016	→ Voluntari (loan)	14	(0)
2020–2021	FCSB	7	(0)
2021	→ Voluntari (loan)	16	(0)
2021–2022	Voluntari	32	(1)
2022–2023	Universitatea Cluj	19	(1)
2023–2024	Korona Kielce	32	(0)
2024–2026	Argeș Pitești	54	(3)
2026–	Chindia Târgoviște	12	(0)
- * Club domestic league appearances and goals as of 31 October 2026

Marius Ionuţ Briceag (born 6 April 1992) is a Romanian professional footballer who plays as a left-back for Liga II club Chindia Târgoviște.

== Career statistics ==
As of 31 October 2026

Appearances and goals by club, season and competition
Club	Season	League			National cup (Note: Includes Cupa României, Polish Cup)		League cup (Note: Includes Cupa Ligii)		Europe		Other		Total	
Club	Season	Division	Apps	Goals	Apps	Goals	Apps	Goals	Apps	Goals	Apps	Goals	Apps	Goals
Argeș Pitești	2010–11	Liga II	20	0	0	0	—		—		—		20	0
Argeș Pitești	2011–12	Liga II	26	0	0	0	—		—		—		26	0
Argeș Pitești	2012–13	Liga II	21	0	1	0	—		—		—		22	0
Argeș Pitești	Total		67	0	1	0	—		—		—		68	0
CSM Râmnicu Vâlcea	2013–14	Liga II	30	1	1	0	—		—		—		31	1
CSM Râmnicu Vâlcea	2014–15	Liga II	14	0	2	0	—		—		—		16	0
CSM Râmnicu Vâlcea	Total		44	1	3	0	—		—		—		47	1
Universitatea Craiova	2014–15	Liga I	8	0	—		—		—		—		8	0
Universitatea Craiova	2016–17	Liga I	23	1	4	0	0	0	—		—		27	1
Universitatea Craiova	2017–18	Liga I	24	0	4	0	—		1 (Note: Appearance(s) in UEFA Europa League)	0	—		29	0
Universitatea Craiova	2018–19	Liga I	13	0	2	0	—		2	0	0	0	17	0
Universitatea Craiova	2019–20	Liga I	0	0	1	0	—		2	0	—		3	0
Universitatea Craiova	Total		68	1	11	0	—		5	0	0	0	84	1
Voluntari (loan)	2015–16	Liga I	14	0	1	0	1	0	—		0	0	16	0
FCSB	2020–21	Liga I	7	0	0	0	—		1	0	—		8	0
Voluntari (loan)	2020–21	Liga I	16	0	—		—		—		0	0	16	0
Voluntari	2021–22	Liga I	32	1	3	0	—		—		—		35	1
Universitatea Cluj	2022–23	Liga I	19	1	4	0	—		—		—		23	1
Korona Kielce	2022–23	Ekstraklasa	17	0	—		—		—		—		17	0
Korona Kielce	2023–24	Ekstraklasa	15	0	1	0	—		—		—		16	0
Korona Kielce	Total		32	0	1	0	—		—		—		33	0
Argeș Pitești	2024–25	Liga II	28	3	3	0	—		—		—		31	3
Argeș Pitești	2025–26	Liga I	26	0	3	0	—		—		—		29	0
Argeș Pitești	Total		54	3	6	0	—		—		—		60	3
Chindia Târgoviște	2026–27	Liga I	12	0	2	0	—		—		—		14	0
Career total			365	7	32	0	1	0	6	0	0	0	404	7

== Honours ==
Universitatea Craiova

- Cupa României: 2017–18
- Supercupa României runner-up: 2018

Voluntari

- Cupa României runner-up: 2021–22

Argeș Pitești

- Liga II: 2024–25
