= Drobeta-Turnu Severin Municipal Stadium =

Stadium in Drobeta-Turnu Severin, Romania

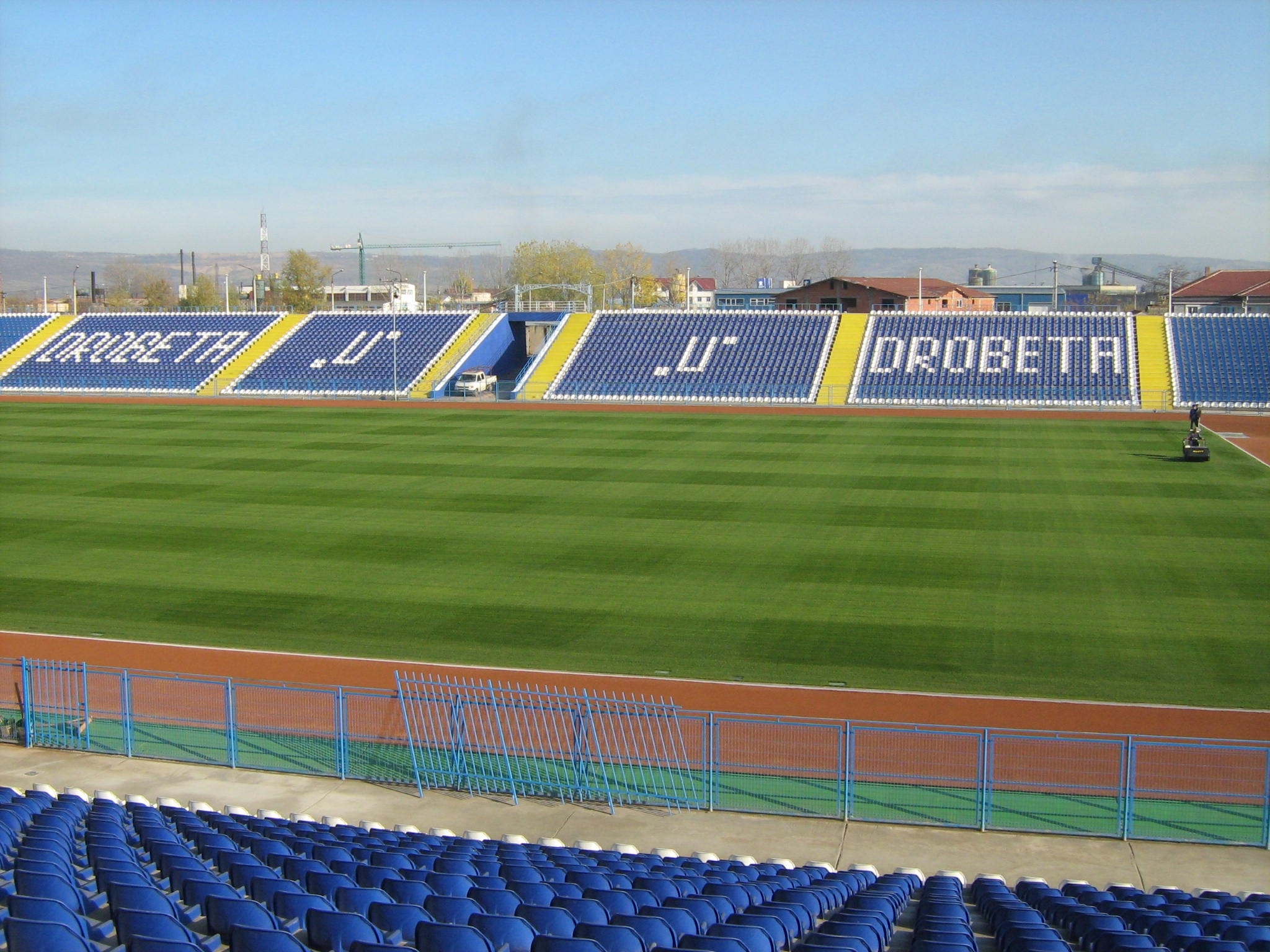
- The venue in 2009
- Interactive map of Drobeta-Turnu Severin Municipal Stadium
- Address: Str. Independenței, nr. 168
- Location: Drobeta-Turnu Severin, Romania
- Coordinates: 44°38′19″N 22°40′2″E
- Owner: Mehedinți County Council
- Operator: FC U Craiova
- Capacity: 20,054 seated
- Surface: Grass

Construction
- Opened: 1977
- Renovated: 2009

Tenants
- FC Drobeta (1977–2011); CS Turnu Severin (2011–2013); Universitatea Craiova (2010, 2013–2014, 2017, 2022); FC U Craiova (2010, 2013, 2018–2019, 2020–present)

The Drobeta-Turnu Severin Municipal Stadium is a multi-use stadium in Drobeta-Turnu Severin, Romania. The stadium holds 20,054 people all on seats and is used mostly for football matches.

In 2009 it was entirely renovated, 20,054 seats were mounted, becoming an all-seater stadium. The floodlighting system was inaugurated in 2010.

== Events ==
=== Association football ===
International football matches
Date	Competition	Home	Away	Score	Attendance
27 July 2017	UEFA Europa League	(Romania) Universitatea Craiova	(Italy) Milan	0–1	14,438

== See also ==
- List of football stadiums in Romania
