= Nicolae Calancea =

Moldovan footballer

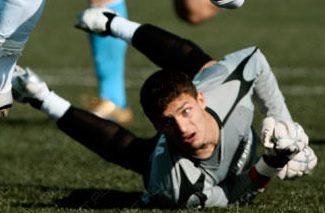
- Calancea playing for Krylia Sovetov 2 in 2008

Personal information
- Date of birth: 29 August 1986 (age 40)
- Place of birth: Chișinău, Moldovan SSR, Soviet Union
- Height: 1.88 m (6 ft 2 in)
- Position: Goalkeeper

Senior career*
Years	Team	Apps	(Gls)
2004–2006	Zimbru-2 Chișinău	34	(0)
2006–2014	Zimbru Chișinău	137	(0)
2008–2009	→ Krylia Sovetov 2 (loan)	3	(0)
2011–2012	→ Zimbru-2 Chișinău (loan)	1	(0)
2014–2015	Ceahlăul Piatra Neamț	39	(0)
2015–2016	Voluntari	7	(0)
2016–2019	Universitatea Craiova	55	(0)
2018	Universitatea II Craiova	4	(0)
2019	Dunărea Călărași	7	(0)
2019	Academica Clinceni	2	(0)
2019–2020	Dunărea Călărași	15	(0)
2020–2023	Sfântul Gheorghe	57	(0)
Total		304	(0)

International career
2007–2018	Moldova	19	(0)
- * Club domestic league appearances and goals

Nicolae Calancea (born 29 August 1986) is a Moldovan former professional footballer who played as a goalkeeper.

== Personal life ==
Calancea's older brother, Valeriu, is a winner of World and European weightlifting medals for Romania.

== Honours ==
Zimbru Chișinău

- Cupa Moldovei: 2006–07

Universitatea Craiova

- Cupa României: 2017–18

FC Sfîntul Gheorghe

- Cupa Moldovei: 2020–21
- Supercupa Moldovei: 2021
