= Nicușor Bancu =

Romanian footballer (born 1992)

- Bancu with Universitatea Craiova in 2025

Personal information
- Full name: Nicușor Silviu Bancu
- Date of birth: 18 September 1992 (age 34)
- Place of birth: Crâmpoia, Romania
- Height: 1.82 m (6 ft 0 in)
- Positions: Left-back; left winger

Team information
- Current team: Universitatea Craiova
- Number: 11

Youth career
- –2010: Rapid Piatra-Olt
- 2010–2011: Olt Piatra-Olt

Senior career*
Years	Team	Apps	(Gls)
2011–2014	Olt Slatina	68	(8)
2014–	Universitatea Craiova	377	(26)

International career^{‡}
2017–	Romania	56	(2)
- * Club domestic league appearances and goals as of 1 November 2026 ‡ National team caps and goals as of 17 November 2026

Nicușor Silviu Bancu (Romanian pronunciation: [nikuˈʃor ˈsilvju ˈbaŋku]; born 18 September 1992) is a Romanian professional footballer who plays as a left-back or a left winger for Liga I club Universitatea Craiova, which he captains, and the Romania national team.

== Club career ==
Bancu recorded his competitive debut for Universitatea Craiova on 16 July 2014, a 0–1 Cupa Ligii loss to Rapid București. His first Liga I match came nine days later in a 1–1 home draw with Pandurii Târgu Jiu.

He scored his first goal for the Alb-albaștrii on 9 September that year, in a 2–0 defeat of Universitatea Cluj. 29 October, Bancu was injured by Viitorul Constanța player Alin Șeroni in a Cupa României Round of 16 game, which ended 1–1 after 90 minutes. He suffered a broken tibia and was sidelined for around half a year.

Bancu made 34 appearances in all competitions in the following season, as his team finished on the eighth place in the domestic league.

In 2019, it was announced that Lazio are keen on bringing Craiova captain Bancu to Stadio Olimpico. They have been monitoring his progress over the past few seasons. Former Biancocelesti captain, Cristiano Bergodi, likened Bancu to Senad Lulić. Earlier, in 2016, Universitatea Craiova rejected an offer from PSV Eindhoven for Bancu.

== Career statistics ==
=== Club ===
As of 5 November 2026

Appearances and goals by club, season and competition
Club	Season	League			Cupa României		Cupa Ligii		Europe		Other		Total	
Club	Season	Division	Apps	Goals	Apps	Goals	Apps	Goals	Apps	Goals	Apps	Goals	Apps	Goals
Olt Slatina	2011–12	Liga II	15	1	0	0	—		—		—		15	1
Olt Slatina	2012–13	Liga II	23	3	0	0	—		—		—		23	3
Olt Slatina	2013–14	Liga II	30	4	1	0	—		—		—		31	4
Olt Slatina	Total		68	8	1	0	—		—		—		69	8
Universitatea Craiova	2014–15	Liga I	13	1	2	0	1	0	—		—		16	1
Universitatea Craiova	2015–16	Liga I	32	3	1	0	1	0	—		—		34	3
Universitatea Craiova	2016–17	Liga I	35	3	4	0	1	0	—		—		40	3
Universitatea Craiova	2017–18	Liga I	34	3	4	1	—		2 (Note: Appearance(s) in UEFA Europa League)	0	—		40	4
Universitatea Craiova	2018–19	Liga I	33	4	5	2	—		2	0	1 (Note: Appearance in Supercupa României)	0	41	6
Universitatea Craiova	2019–20	Liga I	31	4	3	0	—		6	1	—		13	1
Universitatea Craiova	2020–21	Liga I	35	2	5	0	—		1	0	—		41	2
Universitatea Craiova	2021–22	Liga I	35	2	3	0	—		2 (Note: Appearances in UEFA Conference League)	0	0	0	40	2
Universitatea Craiova	2022–23	Liga I	13	0	0	0	—		6	1	—		19	1
Universitatea Craiova	2023–24	Liga I	36	2	2	0	—		—		1 (Note: Appearance in Liga I Conference League play-off)	0	39	2
Universitatea Craiova	2024–25	Liga I	36	1	3	0	—		2	0	—		41	1
Universitatea Craiova	2025–26	Liga I	30	1	5	0	—		10	0	—		45	1
Universitatea Craiova	2026–27	Liga I	14	0	0	0	—		11 (Note: Four appearances and two goals in UEFA Champions League, four appearances and one goal in UEFA Europa League, three appearances and one goal in UEFA Conference League)	4	1	0	26	4
Universitatea Craiova	Total		377	26	37	3	3	0	42	6	3	0	462	35
Career total			445	34	38	3	3	0	42	6	3	0	531	43

=== International ===
As of 17 November 2026

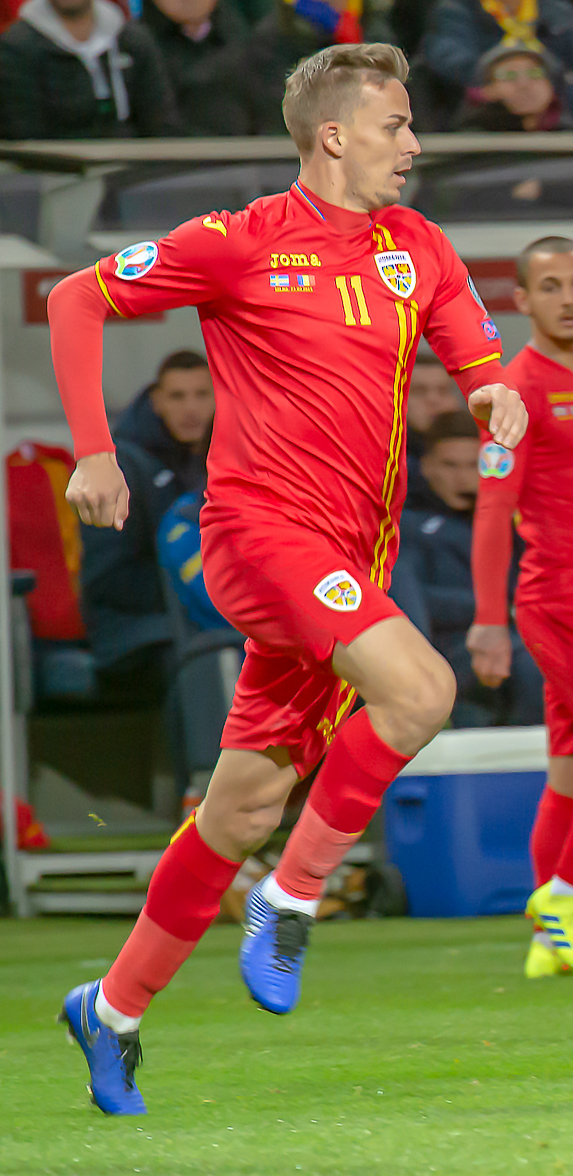
Bancu with Romania in 2019

Appearances and goals by national team and year
National team	Year	Apps	Goals
Romania	2017	1	0
Romania	2018	6	0
Romania	2019	6	0
Romania	2020	4	0
Romania	2021	5	1
Romania	2022	6	1
Romania	2023	6	0
Romania	2024	10	0
Romania	2025	6	0
Romania	2026	6	0
Total		56	2

Scores and results list Romania's goal tally first, score column indicates score after each Bancu goal.

List of international goals scored by Nicușor Bancu
No.	Date	Venue	Cap	Opponent	Score	Result	Competition
1	14 November 2021	Rheinpark Stadion, Vaduz, Liechtenstein	22	Liechtenstein	2–0	2–0	2022 FIFA World Cup qualification
2	11 June 2022	Stadionul Rapid-Giulești, Bucharest, Romania	25	Finland	1–0	1–0	UEFA Nations League B

== Honours ==
Universitatea Craiova

- Liga I: 2025–26
- Cupa României: 2017–18, 2020–21, 2025–26
- Supercupa României: 2021, 2026

Individual

- Liga I Team of the Season: 2020–21, 2021–22
