= Andrei Burlacu =

Romanian professional footballer

Personal information
- Date of birth: 12 January 1997 (age 29)
- Place of birth: Botoșani, Romania
- Height: 1.86 m (6 ft 1 in)
- Position: Forward

Team information
- Current team: Dumbrăvița
- Number: 9

Youth career
- 2004–2014: CSȘ Botoșani
- 2014–2015: Universitatea Craiova

Senior career*
| Years | Team | Apps | (Gls) |
| 2015–2021 | Universitatea Craiova | 43 | (6) |
| 2019 | → Politehnica Iași (loan) | 9 | (0) |
| 2019–2020 | → Chindia Târgoviște (loan) | 14 | (1) |
| 2020 | → Concordia Chiajna (loan) | 2 | (1) |
| 2021–2022 | FCSB | 3 | (0) |
| 2022–2023 | Mioveni | 7 | (0) |
| 2023 | Botoșani | 5 | (0) |
| 2023–2026 | CSM Reșița | 41 | (7) |
| 2026– | Dumbrăvița | 9 | (0) |

International career
| 2017 | Romania U21 | 1 | (0) |
- * Club domestic league appearances and goals as of 31 October 2026

Andrei Burlacu (born 12 January 1997) is a Romanian professional footballer who plays as a forward for Liga II club Dumbrăvița.

== Career statistics ==
As of match played 31 October 2026

Appearances and goals by club, season and competition
| Club | Season | League | | | Cupa României | | Continental | | Other | | Total | |
| Club | Season | Division | Apps | Goals | Apps | Goals | Apps | Goals | Apps | Goals | Apps | Goals |
|---|---|---|---|---|---|---|---|---|---|---|---|---|
| Universitatea Craiova | 2015–16 | Liga I | 1 | 0 | 0 | 0 | 0 | 0 | — | | 1 | 0 |
| Universitatea Craiova | 2016–17 | Liga I | 2 | 0 | 1 | 0 | 0 | 0 | — | | 3 | 0 |
| Universitatea Craiova | 2017–18 | Liga I | 28 | 5 | 6 | 0 | — | | — | | 34 | 5 |
| Universitatea Craiova | 2018–19 | Liga I | 12 | 1 | 2 | 1 | 1 (Note: Appearance in UEFA Europa League) | 0 | 1 (Note: Appearance in Supercupa României) | 0 | 16 | 2 |
| Universitatea Craiova | Total | | 43 | 6 | 9 | 1 | 1 | 0 | 1 | 0 | 54 | 7 |
| Politehnica Iași (loan) | 2018–19 | Liga I | 8 | 0 | — | | — | | — | | 8 | 0 |
| Chindia Târgoviște (loan) | 2019–20 | Liga I | 14 | 1 | 0 | 0 | — | | — | | 14 | 1 |
| Concordia Chiajna (loan) | 2019–20 | Liga II | 2 | 1 | — | | — | | — | | 2 | 1 |
| FCSB | 2021–22 | Liga I | 3 | 0 | 0 | 0 | — | | — | | 3 | 0 |
| Mioveni | 2022–23 | Liga I | 7 | 0 | 2 | 1 | — | | — | | 9 | 1 |
| Botoșani | 2022–23 | Liga I | 5 | 0 | — | | — | | — | | 5 | 0 |
| CSM Reșița | 2023–24 | Liga II | 19 | 4 | 0 | 0 | — | | — | | 19 | 4 |
| CSM Reșița | 2024–25 | Liga II | 16 | 2 | 3 | 0 | — | | — | | 19 | 2 |
| CSM Reșița | 2025–26 | Liga II | 6 | 1 | 0 | 0 | — | | — | | 6 | 1 |
| CSM Reșița | Total | | 41 | 7 | 3 | 0 | — | | — | | 44 | 7 |
| Dumbrăvița | 2026–27 | Liga II | 9 | 0 | 1 | 0 | — | | — | | 10 | 0 |
| Career total | | | 132 | 15 | 15 | 2 | 1 | 0 | 1 | 0 | 149 | 17 |

== Honours ==
Universitatea Craiova

- Cupa României: 2017–18
- Supercupa României runner-up: 2018
