= Jovan Marković =

Romanian professional footballer

Personal information
- Date of birth: 23 March 2001 (age 25)
- Place of birth: Belgrade, FR Yugoslavia
- Height: 1.83 m (6 ft 0 in)
- Position: Striker

Team information
- Current team: Botoșani
- Number: 9

Youth career
- CSȘ Corabia
- –2017: Universitatea Craiova

Senior career*
Years	Team	Apps	(Gls)
2017–2025	Universitatea Craiova	122	(26)
2020–2021	→ Academica Clinceni (loan)	26	(5)
2024–2025	→ Hermannstadt (loan)	4	(0)
2025	→ Oțelul Galați (loan)	7	(1)
2025–2026	Farul Constanța	16	(1)
2026–	Botoșani	10	(1)

International career^{‡}
2017–2018	Romania U17	7	(2)
2018	Romania U19	1	(1)
2021–2023	Romania U21	15	(3)
2021	Romania	3	(0)
- * Club domestic league appearances and goals as of 1 November 2026 ‡ National team caps and goals as of 28 June 2023

Jovan Marković (Serbian Cyrillic: Јован Марковић, pronounced [jǒʋan mǎːrkoʋitɕ], Romanian: Iovan Marcovici; born 23 March 2001) is a Romanian professional footballer who plays as a striker for Liga I club Botoșani.

== Club career ==
Marković made his Liga I debut for Universitatea Craiova on 1 April 2017, aged 16, in a 1–4 home loss to CFR Cluj. His breakthrough came in the 2021–22 season, following a loan stint at Academica Clinceni, as he managed to score 13 goals from 44 games in all competitions.

== International career ==
Marković made his debut for the Romania national team on 2 September 2021, in a 2–0 away victory over Iceland in the FIFA World Cup qualifiers.

== Personal life ==
Marković was born in Belgrade to a Serbian father and a Romanian mother from Corabia, Olt County. He has one son, named Matija.

== Career statistics ==
=== Club ===
As of match played 1 November 2026

Appearances and goals by club, season and competition
Club	Season	League			Cupa României		Europe		Other		Total	
Club	Season	Division	Apps	Goals	Apps	Goals	Apps	Goals	Apps	Goals	Apps	Goals
Universitatea Craiova	2016–17	Liga I	3	0	1	0	0	0	0	0	4	0
Universitatea Craiova	2018–19	Liga I	4	0	1	1	2 (Note: Appearances in UEFA Europa League)	0	1 (Note: Appearance in Supercupa României)	0	8	1
Universitatea Craiova	2019–20	Liga I	3	0	—		—		—		3	0
Universitatea Craiova	2021–22	Liga I	35	13	5	0	2 (Note: Appearances in UEFA Conference League)	0	2 (Note: One appearance in Supercupa României, one appearance in Liga I play-offs for UEFA Europa Conference League)	0	44	13
Universitatea Craiova	2022–23	Liga I	37	7	3	0	4	0	—		44	7
Universitatea Craiova	2023–24	Liga I	39	6	3	0	—		1 (Note: Appearance in Liga I play-offs for UEFA Conference League)	0	43	6
Universitatea Craiova	2025–26	Liga I	1	0	—		2	0	—		3	0
Universitatea Craiova	Total		122	26	13	1	10	0	4	0	149	27
Academica Clinceni (loan)	2019–20	Liga I	13	1	1	0	—		—		14	1
Academica Clinceni (loan)	2020–21	Liga I	13	4	0	0	—		—		13	4
Academica Clinceni (loan)	Total		26	5	1	0	0	0	0	0	27	5
Hermannstadt (loan)	2024–25	Liga I	4	0	0	0	—		—		4	0
Oțelul Galați (loan)	2024–25	Liga I	7	1	—		—		—		7	1
Farul Constanța	2025–26	Liga I	16	1	4	4	—		1 (Note: Appearances in Liga I promotion/relegation play-offs)	1	21	6
Botoșani	2026–27	Liga I	10	1	2	1	—		—		12	2
Career total			185	34	20	6	10	0	5	1	220	41

=== International ===
As of match played 5 September 2021

Appearances and goals by national team and year
National team	Year	Apps	Goals
Romania
Romania	2021	3	0
Total		3	0

== Honours ==
Universitatea Craiova

- Supercupa României: 2021; runner-up: 2018
