= 2021 Supercupa României =

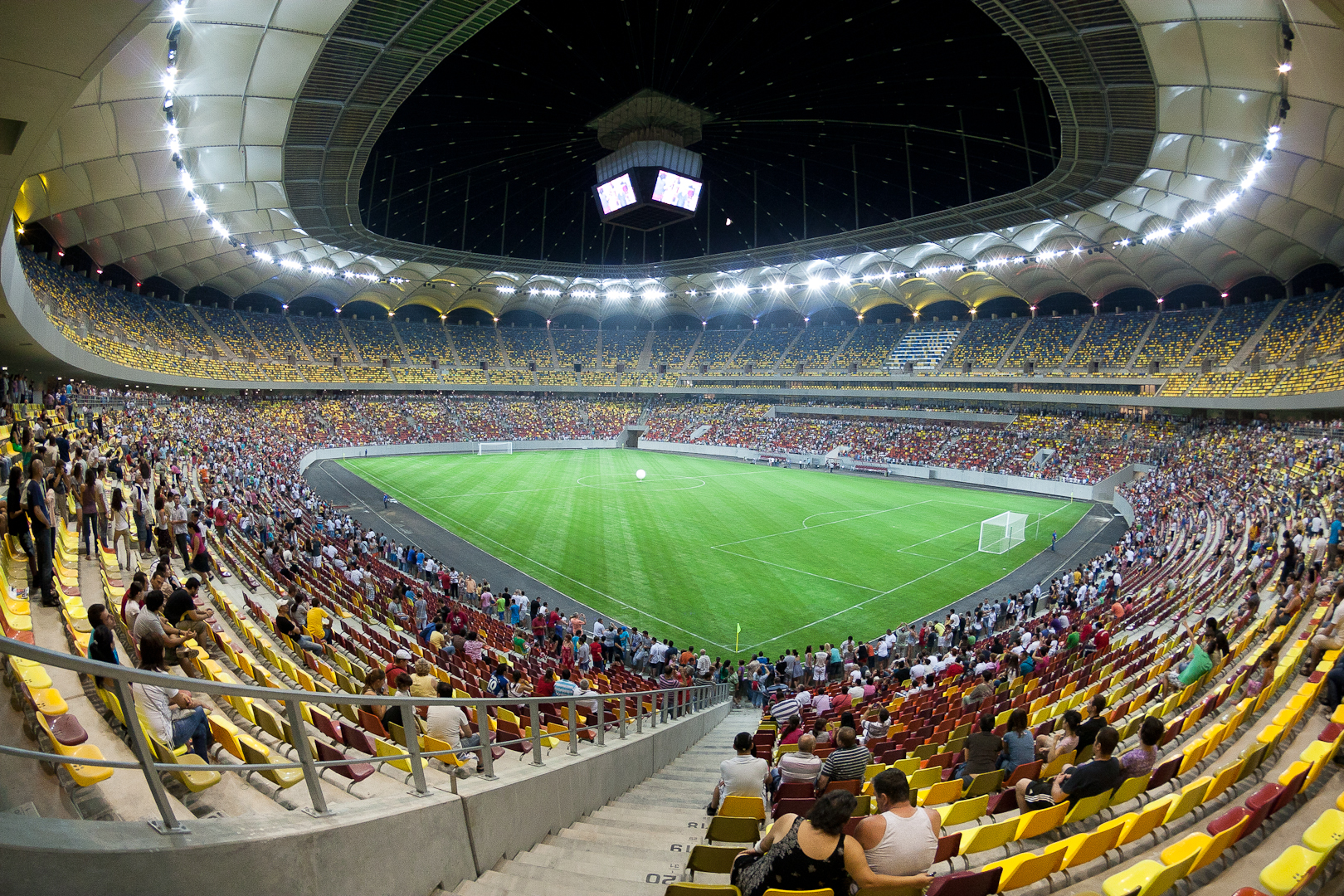
- The Arena Națională in Bucharest hosted the match
- Event: 2021 Supercupa României
CFR Cluj	Universitatea Craiova
Liga I	Cupa României
0	0
- Universitatea Craiova won 4–2 on penalties
- Date: 10 July 2021
- Venue: Arena Națională, Bucharest
- Man of the Match: Mirko Pigliacelli
- Referee: Adrian Cojocaru
- Attendance: 4.000
- Weather: Clear

The 2021 Supercupa României was the 23rd edition of the Supercupa României, an annual football super cup contested by the winners of the previous season's Liga I and Cupa României competitions.

The game featured CFR Cluj and Universitatea Craiova, with the Arena Națională in Bucharest hosting the competition for the first time since 2014. Universitatea Craiova claimed its first Supercup after a 4–2 victory at the penalty shoot-out.

== Teams ==
Team	Qualification	Previous participations (bold indicates winners)
CFR Cluj	Winners of the 2020–21 Liga I	7 (**2009**, **2010**, 2012, 2016, **2018**, 2019, **2020**)
Universitatea Craiova	Winners of the 2020–21 Cupa României	1 (2018)

== Match ==
=== Details ===
10 July 2021
20:00 EEST (UTC+03)

CFR Cluj	0–0	Universitatea Craiova
	Report 1 Report 2 Report 3
Penalties
Rodríguez (penalty scored); Păun (penalty missed); Costache (penalty scored); Omrani (penalty missed)	2–4	(penalty scored) Gustavo; (penalty scored) Găman; (penalty scored) Cicâldău; (penalty scored) Marković

Arena Națională, Bucharest
Referee: Adrian Cojocaru

**CFR Cluj**	**Universitatea Craiova**

GK	87	(Lithuania) Giedrius Arlauskis
RB	4	(Romania) Cristian Manea
CB	29	(Algeria) Rachid Bouhenna
CB	6	(Bosnia and Herzegovina) Daniel Graovac
LB	45	(Portugal) Camora (c)
RCM	8	(Iceland) Rúnar Már Sigurjónsson		(substituted off) 46'
CM	5	(Argentina) Jonathan Rodríguez
LCM	11	(Romania) Alexandru Chipciu		(substituted off) 70'
RW	27	(Romania) Claudiu Petrila	(yellow card) 88'
CF	22	(Croatia) Gabriel Debeljuh		(substituted off) 46'
LW	10	(Romania) Ciprian Deac
Substitutes:
GK	34	(Romania) Cristian Bălgrădean
CB	92	(Democratic Republic of the Congo) Mike Cestor
LB	14	(Romania) Iasmin Latovlevici
CM	28	(Romania) Ovidiu Hoban
CM	21	(Morocco) Anas Tahiri
LW	18	(Romania) Valentin Costache		(substituted on) 70'
CM	75	(Romania) Adrian Gîdea
CF	9	(Algeria) Billel Omrani		(substituted on) 46'
RW	7	(Romania) Alexandru Păun		(substituted on) 46'
Manager:
(Romania) Marius Șumudică

GK	13	(Italy) Mirko Pigliacelli
RB	99	(France) Antoine Conte		(substituted off) 83'
CB	4	(Romania) Mihai Bălașa
CB	23	(Romania) Marius Constantin
LB	5	(Romania) Bogdan Vătăjelu
LCM	28	(Romania) George Cîmpanu		(substituted off) 72'
CM	16	(Romania) Dan Nistor
RCM	8	(Romania) Alexandru Mateiu	(yellow card) 69'	(substituted off) 90'
RW	10	(Romania) Alexandru Cicâldău (c)	(yellow card) 90+2'
CF	19	(Bosnia and Herzegovina) Elvir Koljić		(substituted off) 90'
LW	9	(Romania) Andrei Ivan		(substituted off) 90'
Substitutes:
GK	1	(Romania) David Lazar
CB	25	(Romania) Valerică Găman		(substituted on) 90'
CB	6	(Romania) Vladimir Screciu		(substituted on) 72'
RB	18	(Romania) Ștefan Vlădoiu		(substituted on) 83'
RB	39	(Romania) Ionuț Mitran
CM	29	(Romania) Ovidiu Bic
CM	21	(Switzerland) Matteo Fedele
RW	11	(Brazil) Gustavo Vagenin		(substituted on) 90'
CF	16	(Romania) Jovan Marković		(substituted on) 90'
Manager:
(Greece) Marinos Ouzounidis

**MAN OF THE MATCH**

- (Italy) Mirko Pigliacelli

**MATCH OFFICIALS**

- Assistant referees:
  - Marius Badea
  - Ferencz Tunyogi
- Fourth official:
  - Sorin Costreie
- Additional assistant referees:

**MATCH RULES**

- 90 minutes.
- Penalty shoot-out if scores still level.
- Nine named substitutes.
- Maximum of five substitutions.

=== Statistics ===
Overall
Statistic	CFR Cluj	Universitatea Craiova
Goals scored	0	0
Total shots	7	2
Shots on target	1	0
Ball possession	34%	66%
Corner kicks	2	3
Fouls committed	13	9
Offsides	1	2
Yellow cards	1	2
Red cards	0	0

== See also ==
- 2021–22 Liga I
- 2021–22 Cupa României
