= Renato Kelić =

Croatian association football player (born 1991)

Personal information
- Full name: Renato Kelić
- Date of birth: 31 March 1991 (age 35)
- Place of birth: Vinkovci, SR Croatia, Yugoslavia
- Height: 1.92 m (6 ft 3 1/2 in)
- Position: Centre back

Team information
- Current team: Cibalia
- Number: 4

Youth career
- 1997–2008: Cibalia
- 2008–2009: Slovan Liberec

Senior career*
Years	Team	Apps	(Gls)
2009–2014	Slovan Liberec	97	(5)
2014	Padova	13	(1)
2014–2016	Puskás	50	(0)
2016–2020	Universitatea Craiova	90	(2)
2020	Cibalia	3	(0)
2020–2022	Buriram United	12	(3)
2021–2022	→ Chonburi (loan)	32	(5)
2022–2023	Chonburi	21	(0)
2023	BG Pathum United	5	(2)
2024–	Cibalia	51	(1)

International career
2006–2007	Croatia U16	4	(0)
2007–2008	Croatia U17	7	(1)
2008–2009	Croatia U18	8	(1)
2008–2010	Croatia U19	13	(0)
2011	Croatia U20	3	(0)
2011–2013	Croatia U21	10	(0)
- * Club domestic league appearances and goals as of 16 June 2026

Renato Kelić (born 31 March 1991) is a Croatian professional footballer who plays as a centre back for First Football League club Cibalia.

== Honours ==
Slovan Liberec

- Czech First League: 2011–12

Universitatea Craiova

- Cupa României: 2017–18
- Supercupa României runner-up: 2018

Chonburi

- Thai FA Cup runner-up: 2020–21
