= Ivan Martić =

Swiss footballer

Personal information
- Date of birth: 2 October 1990 (age 36)
- Place of birth: Uzwil, Switzerland
- Height: 1.83 m (6 ft 0 in)
- Position: Right-back

Team information
- Current team: FC Uzwil (manager)

Youth career
- FC Uzwil
- –2008: St. Gallen

Senior career*
Years	Team	Apps	(Gls)
2008–2012	St. Gallen II	59	(8)
2009–2014	St. Gallen	76	(1)
2010	→ Schaffhausen (loan)	15	(3)
2014–2015	Hellas Verona	16	(0)
2015–2016	Spezia	14	(0)
2016–2017	Rijeka	22	(0)
2017–2020	Universitatea Craiova	60	(4)
2020–2022	Sion	17	(0)
2022–2023	Universitatea Craiova	10	(0)
2023	→ Universitatea Cluj (loan)	13	(0)
2023–2024	Wil	29	(2)
2024–2025	SC Brühl	12	(1)
Total		343	(19)

Managerial career
- 2024–2025: FC Sirnach
- 2025–: FC Uzwil
- * Club domestic league appearances and goals

Ivan Martić (born 2 October 1990) is a Swiss professional football manager and former player who played as a right-back. He is currently in charge of 2. Liga Interregional club FC Uzwil.

== Club career ==
=== St. Gallen and loan to Schaffhausen ===
Martić started his career in Swiss club St. Gallen, debuting for the reserve team, and going to loan to Schaffhausen, before establishing himself in FC St. Gallen's first team.

=== Hellas Verona ===
On 15 May 2014, Hellas Verona announced the signing of Martić.

=== Spezia ===
On 27 July 2015, after just one season in Verona, he went to Spezia.

=== Rijeka ===
On 26 July 2016, Martić signed a three-year contract with Rijeka in Croatia.

=== Universitatea Craiova ===
On 4 September 2017, it was revealed that Martić signed a three-year contract with CS Universitatea Craiova in Romania. On 22 April 2020, Martić was released from the club after having his contract mutually terminated.

=== Sion ===
On 31 August 2020 he joined Sion.

=== Return to Romania ===
Having returned to Universitatea Craiova in 2022, Martić signed for Universitatea Cluj on loan until the end of the season in February 2023.

== International career ==
Born in Switzerland, Martić is eligible to represent three countries at international level: Switzerland, Croatia and Bosnia and Herzegovina.

In 2015, he claimed he wanted to play for Bosnia and Herzegovina since his family hails from city of Derventa.

== Honours ==
St. Gallen

- Challenge League: 2011–12

HNK Rijeka

- 1. HNL: 2016–17
- Croatian Cup: 2016–17

Universitatea Craiova

- Cupa României: 2017–18
- Supercupa României runner-up: 2018

Universitatea Cluj

- Cupa României runner-up: 2022–23
