= Hristo Zlatinski =

Bulgarian footballer

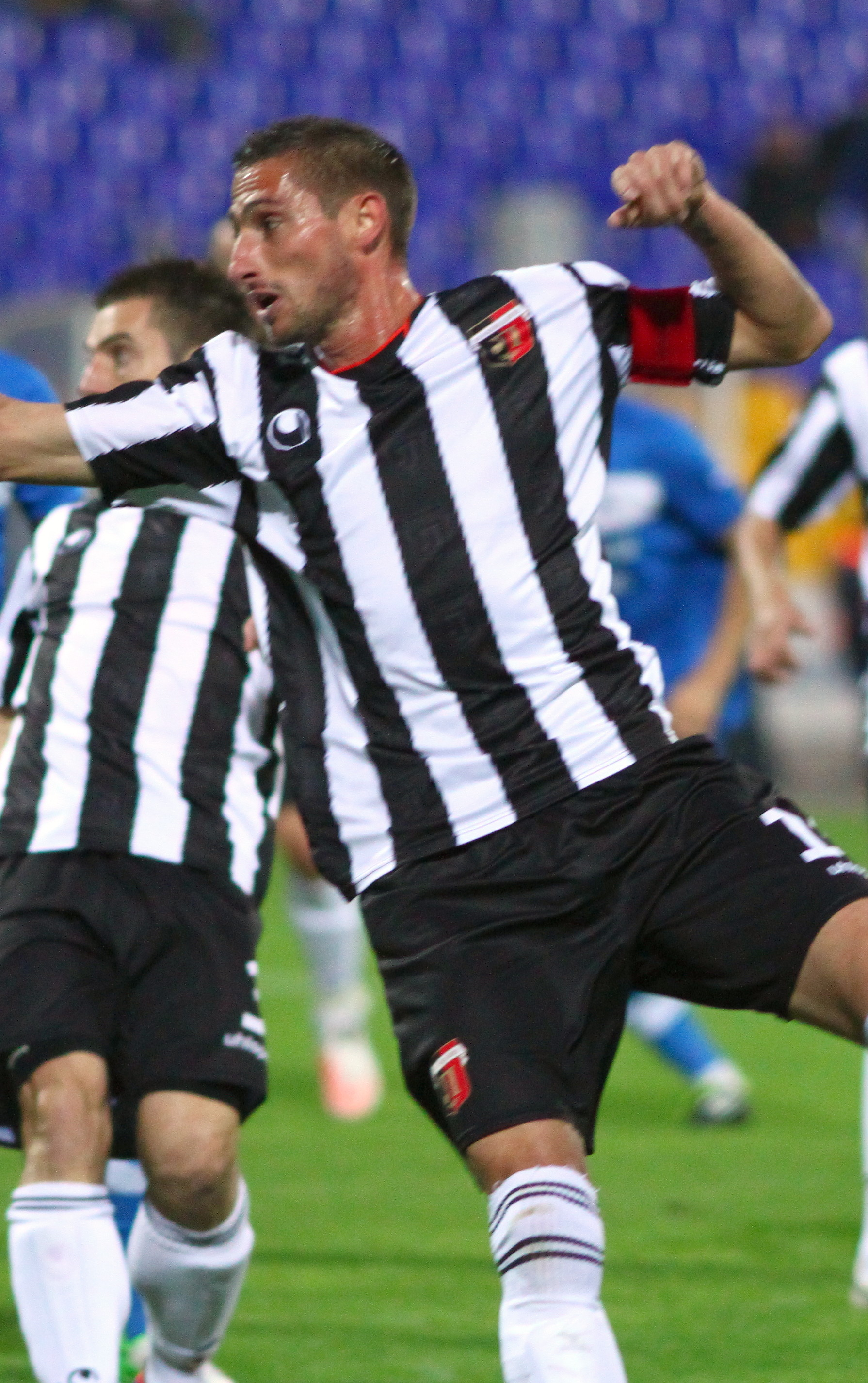
- Zlatinski playing for Lokomotiv Plovdiv in 2012

Personal information
- Full name: Hristo Evtimov Zlatinski
- Date of birth: 22 January 1985 (age 41)
- Place of birth: Gotse Delchev, Bulgaria
- Height: 1.77 m (5 ft 10 in)
- Position: Midfielder

Team information
- Current team: Ludogorets III (manager)

Senior career*
Years	Team	Apps	(Gls)
2001–2005	Pirin Blagoevgrad	56	(5)
2005–2007	Lokomotiv Plovdiv	45	(10)
2007–2010	Lokomotiv Sofia	74	(6)
2010–2013	Lokomotiv Plovdiv	79	(21)
2013–2015	Ludogorets Razgrad	46	(9)
2015–2018	Universitatea Craiova	99	(9)
2018–2019	FCSB	3	(0)
2019–2021	Botev Vratsa	42	(1)
2022–2023	Lokomotiv Plovdiv II	6	(4)
Total		450	(65)

International career
2004–2006	Bulgaria U 21	11	(0)
2011–2015	Bulgaria	12	(0)

Managerial career
- 2023–2024: Lokomotiv Plovdiv II
- 2024: Lokomotiv Plovdiv
- 2025: Lokomotiv Plovdiv II
- 2025–: Ludogorets III
- * Club domestic league appearances and goals

Hristo Zlatinski (Bulgarian: Христо Златински; born 22 January 1985) is a Bulgarian professional football manager and former player who is currently in charge of Ludogorets III.

== Club career ==
Zlatinski started his career in his home town Blagoevgrad in the local team Pirin. In 2005, he joined Lokomotiv Plovdiv. For two years in Plovdiv he played in 46 matches and scored 4 goals. In this period Zlatinski played also for the Bulgaria national under-21 football team. In June 2007 he signed for three years with Lokomotiv Sofia. In 2010 Zlatinski returned to Lokomotiv Plovdiv.

On 18 June 2013, Zlatinski joined Bulgarian champion Ludogorets Razgrad. During the 2013–14 UEFA Europa League, he scored two goals with long-distance efforts, in a 1–0 win over Chornomorets Odesa and on 27 February 2014 in a 3–3 draw with Lazio. He became 3rd captain of the side and one of the leaders in the changing room. For entire season Zlatinski scored 12 goals in all competitions.

== International career ==
Zlatinski received his first call-up to the senior team in Mihail Madanski's first game in charge of Bulgaria in October 2011. On 7 October, he made his Bulgaria debut in a 3–0 friendly loss against Ukraine.

== Personal life ==
He is married to Vanya. They have two children - a daughter named Elia and a younger son Christian.

== Career statistics ==
=== Club ===
Appearances and goals by club, season and competition
Club	Season	League			National cup (Note: Includes Bulgarian Cup, Cupa României)		League cup (Note: Includes Cupa Ligii)		Europe		Other		Total	
Club	Season	Division	Apps	Goals	Apps	Goals	Apps	Goals	Apps	Goals	Apps	Goals	Apps	Goals
Pirin Blagoevgrad	2001–02	B Group	2	0	0	0	—		—		—		2	0
Pirin Blagoevgrad	2002–03	B Group	14	1	0	0	—		—		—		14	1
Pirin Blagoevgrad	2003–04	B Group	16	2	0	0	—		—		—		16	2
Pirin Blagoevgrad	2004–05	A Group	24	2	0	0	—		—		—		24	2
Pirin Blagoevgrad	Total		56	5	0	0	—		—		—		56	5
Lokomotiv Plovdiv	2005–06	A Group	16	1	0	0	—		—		—		16	1
Lokomotiv Plovdiv	2006–07	A Group	29	9	0	0	—		2 (Note: Appearances in UEFA Intertoto Cup)	0	—		31	9
Lokomotiv Plovdiv	Total		45	10	0	0	—		2	0	—		47	10
Lokomotiv Sofia	2007–08	A Group	24	2	0	0	—		3 (Note: Appearances in UEFA Cup)	0	—		27	2
Lokomotiv Sofia	2008–09	A Group	24	2	0	0	—		2	0	—		26	2
Lokomotiv Sofia	2009–10	A Group	26	2	0	0	—		—		—		26	2
Lokomotiv Sofia	Total		74	6	0	0	—		5	0	—		79	6
Lokomotiv Plovdiv	2010–11	A Group	29	11	0	0	—		—		—		29	11
Lokomotiv Plovdiv	2011–12	A Group	24	6	1	0	—		—		—		25	6
Lokomotiv Plovdiv	2012–13	A Group	26	4	0	0	—		2 (Note: Appearances in UEFA Europa League)	1	1 (Note: Appearance in Bulgarian Supercup)	0	29	5
Lokomotiv Plovdiv	Total		79	21	1	0	—		2	1	1	0	83	22
Ludogorets Razgrad	2013–14	A Group	28	7	7	2	—		15 (Note: Six appearances and one goal in UEFA Champions League, nine appearances and two goals in UEFA Europa League)	3	1	0	51	12
Ludogorets Razgrad	2014–15	A Group	18	2	4	0	—		4 (Note: Appearances in UEFA Champions League)	0	1	0	27	2
Ludogorets Razgrad	Total		46	9	11	2	—		19	3	2	0	78	14
Universitatea Craiova	2015–16	Liga I	33	2	0	0	1	0	—		—		34	2
Universitatea Craiova	2016–17	Liga I	35	6	3	0	1	0	—		—		39	6
Universitatea Craiova	2017–18	Liga I	30	1	5	0	—		2	0	—		37	1
Universitatea Craiova	2018–19	Liga I	1	0	—		—		0	0	1 (Note: Appearance in Supercupa României)	0	2	0
Universitatea Craiova	Total		99	9	8	0	2	0	2	0	1	0	112	9
FCSB	2018–19	Liga I	3	0	2	0	—		—		—		5	0
Botev Vratsa	2019–20	A Group	17	0	1	0	—		—		–		18	0
Botev Vratsa	2020–21	A Group	25	1	2	0	—		—		1 (Note: Appearance in A Group promotion/relegation play-offs)	1	28	2
Botev Vratsa	Total		42	1	3	0	—		—		1	1	46	2
Career total			444	61	25	2	2	0	30	4	5	1	506	68

=== International ===
Appearances and goals by national team and year
National team	Year	Apps	Goals
Bulgaria	2011	1	0
Bulgaria	2012	3	0
Bulgaria	2013	4	0
Bulgaria	2014	2	0
Bulgaria	2015	2	0
Total		12	0

== Honours ==
Ludogorets

- Bulgarian A Group: 2013–14, 2014–15
- Bulgarian Cup: 2013–14
- Bulgarian Supercup: 2014

Universitatea Craiova

- Cupa României: 2017–18
- Supercupa României runner-up: 2018
