= Miodrag Mitrović =

Swiss footballer (born 1991)

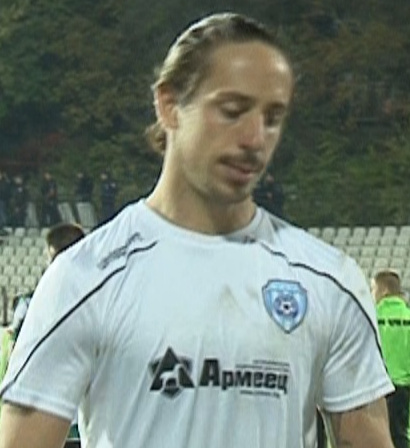

Personal information
- Date of birth: 14 July 1991 (age 35)
- Place of birth: Bellinzona, Switzerland
- Height: 1.82 m (5 ft 11 1/2 in)
- Position: Goalkeeper

Team information
- Current team: Chiasso
- Number: 18

Youth career
- 2000–2007: Bellinzona
- 2007–2009: Lugano

Senior career*
| Years | Team | Apps | (Gls) |
| 2009–2013 | Locarno | 81 | (0) |
| 2010 | → Biaschesi (loan) | 12 | (0) |
| 2013–2014 | Chiasso | 0 | (0) |
| 2013–2014 | → Bari (loan) | 0 | (0) |
| 2014–2016 | Krka | 47 | (0) |
| 2016–2017 | Chiasso | 0 | (0) |
| 2017–2018 | Universitatea Craiova | 11 | (0) |
| 2019–2020 | Cherno More | 21 | (0) |
| 2020–2021 | FC Paradiso | 12 | (0) |
| 2021–2023 | Chiasso | 42 | (0) |
| 2023– | FC Paradiso | 26 | (0) |

International career
| 2010–2011 | Switzerland U20 | 3 | (0) |
- * Club domestic league appearances and goals as of 1 October 2022

Miodrag Mitrović (born 14 July 1991) is a Swiss professional footballer who plays as a goalkeeper for Chiasso. He is from Bosnian Serb descent.

== Honours ==
Universitatea Craiova

- Cupa României: 2017–18
