= Răzvan Popa (footballer) =

Romanian footballer

Personal information
- Full name: Răzvan Ștefan Popa
- Date of birth: 4 January 1997 (age 29)
- Place of birth: Râmnicu Vâlcea, Romania
- Height: 1.90 m (6 ft 3 in)
- Positions: Centre-back; defensive midfielder

Youth career
- 2004–2007: Sporting Râmnicu Vâlcea
- 2007–2011: Steaua București
- 2011–2012: Sportul Studențesc
- 2013–2016: Inter Milan

Senior career*
Years	Team	Apps	(Gls)
2012–2013	Sportul Studențesc	5	(0)
2015–2016	Inter Milan	0	(0)
2016–2017	Zaragoza	1	(0)
2017	→ Burgos (loan)	11	(0)
2017–2019	Universitatea Craiova	17	(0)
2019–2020	Gaz Metan Mediaș	22	(0)
2020–2021	Politehnica Iași	17	(0)
2021–2022	Dinamo București	7	(0)
Total		80	(0)

International career^{‡}
2012	Romania U-17	1	(0)
2015–2016	Romania U-19	6	(0)
2017–2018	Romania U-21	2	(0)
- * Club domestic league appearances and goals as of 20 December 2021 ‡ National team caps and goals as of 10 November 2017

Răzvan Ștefan Popa (born 4 January 1997) is a Romanian professional footballer. Mainly a central defender, he can also play as a central midfielder.

== Club career ==
Popa was born in Râmnicu Vâlcea, and was a FC Sportul Studențesc București youth graduate. He made his Romanian Liga I debut at 15 years and 2 months of age, when he was substituted in the stoppage time on 17 March 2012 against Dinamo București.

In August 2013, Popa joined Internazionale Milano after the Italian side battled Chelsea for him. However, he only appeared for the Primavera team during the course of three seasons.

On 21 July 2016, Popa signed a three-year contract with Spanish Segunda División side Real Zaragoza. He made his debut for the club on 7 September, starting and scoring his team's only in a 1–2 home loss against Real Valladolid for the season's Copa del Rey.

In September 2021, he was signed Dinamo București as a free agent.

== Honours ==
Universitatea Craiova

- Cupa României: 2017–18
- Supercupa României: Runner-up 2018
