= Radoslav Dimitrov =

Bulgarian footballer

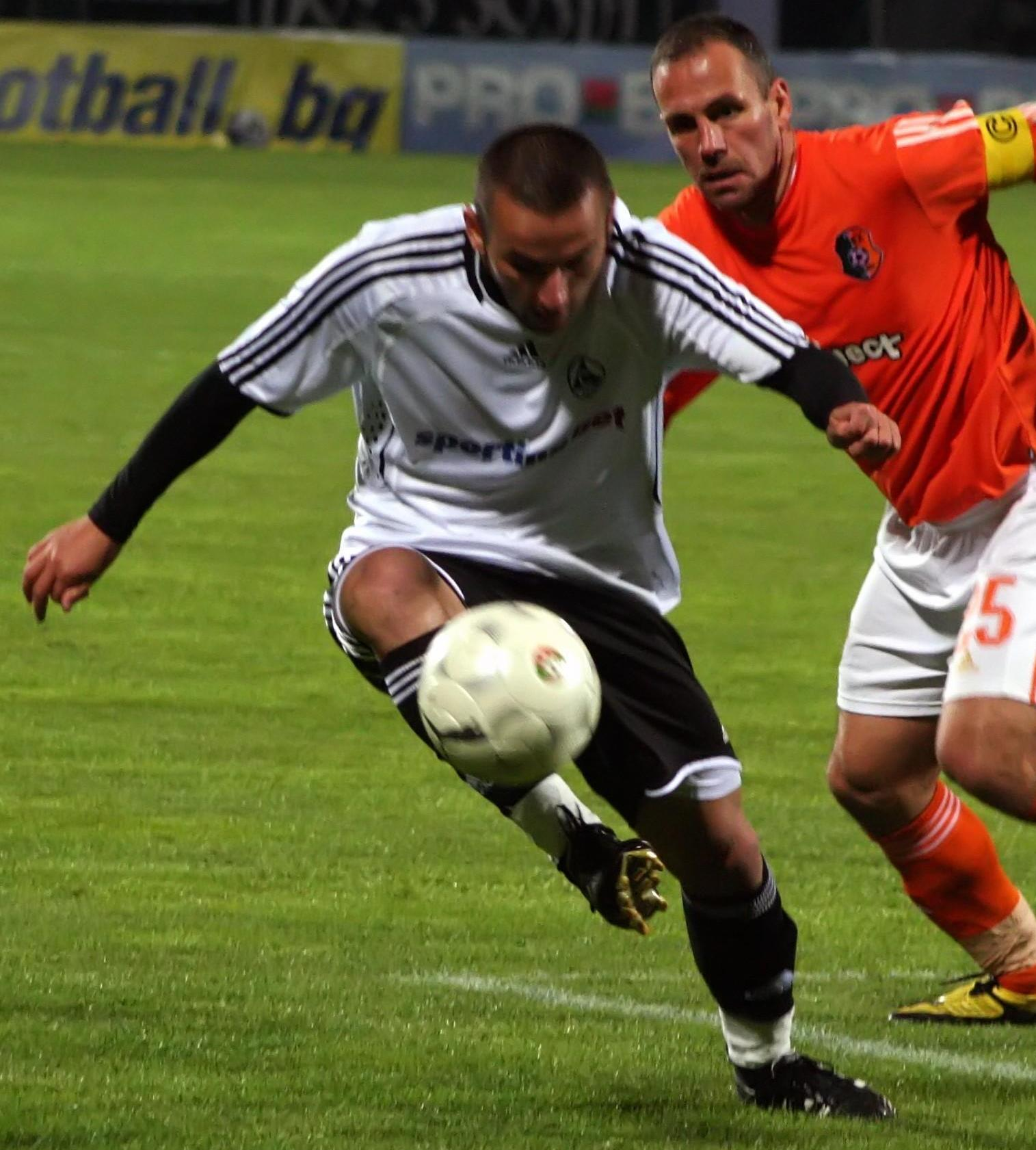
- Dimitrov playing for Slavia Sofia in 2010

Personal information
- Full name: Radoslav Bonchev Dimitrov
- Date of birth: 12 August 1988 (age 38)
- Place of birth: Lovech, Bulgaria
- Height: 1.75 m (5 ft 9 in)
- Position: Right-back

Youth career
- 1996–2007: Litex Lovech

Senior career*
Years	Team	Apps	(Gls)
2007–2008	Litex Lovech	0	(0)
2007–2008	→ Montana (loan)	23	(0)
2008	→ Sportist Svoge (loan)	15	(0)
2009–2014	Slavia Sofia	134	(2)
2010	→ Montana (loan)	13	(0)
2014	Levski Sofia	2	(0)
2015	Lokomotiv Plovdiv	9	(0)
2015–2016	Botoșani	48	(1)
2017–2019	Universitatea Craiova	44	(2)
2019–2023	Sepsi OSK	114	(1)
2023	Universitatea Cluj	7	(0)
2024	Botoșani	3	(0)
2024–2025	Spartak Varna	15	(0)
Total		427	(6)

International career
2009–2010	Bulgaria U21	2	(0)
2013	Bulgaria	4	(1)
- * Club domestic league appearances and goals as of 9 December 2024

Radoslav Bonchev Dimitrov (Bulgarian: Радослав Бончев Димитров; born 12 August 1988) is a Bulgarian former professional footballer who played as a right-back.

== Club career ==
Dimitrov began his football career at the Litex Lovech's Youth Academy. He failed to break into the first team, and went out on loan to Montana and then Sportist Svoge.

In January 2009, Dimitrov joined Slavia Sofia. He made his league debut on 9 March 2009, coming on as a second-half substitute during the 1–0 away win over Litex Lovech. Dimitrov's first start for Slavia came on 17 March in their 5–2 away victory over Belasitsa Petrich, playing 56 minutes.

In January 2010, Dimitrov was loaned out to fellow A PFG club Montana for the rest of the season. He returned to Slavia at the end of the season having made 13 appearances in Montana's successful battle against relegation.

Dimitrov became a regular starter for Slavia during the 2010–11 A PFG season. On 4 December 2010, he tallied his first goal to give Slavia a 1–0 win against Etar 1924 for Bulgarian Cup. He netted his first league goal against Lokomotiv Plovdiv on 2 April 2011, scoring the equalizing goal as the game ended in a 1–1 draw.

After five years of playing for Slavia Dimitrov was released and in June 2014 he signed a two-year contract with Levski Sofia.

== International career ==
On 15 March 2013, Dimitrov received his first call-up to play for the Bulgaria national team for 2014 World Cup Qualifiers against Malta and Denmark. On 22 March, he made his debut in a 6–0 win over Malta, coming on as a substitute for Yordan Minev.

On 10 September, Dimitrov started as a first-team choice in the qualification game against Malta. He scored the opening goal of the game managing to score his first international goal. The game ended with a 2–1 victory for Bulgaria.

== Career statistics ==
=== Club ===
As of match played 9 December 2024

Appearances and goals by club, season and competition
Club	Season	League			National cup (Note: Includes Bulgarian Cup, Cupa României)		League cup (Note: Includes Cupa Ligii)		Europe		Other		Total	
Club	Season	Division	Apps	Goals	Apps	Goals	Apps	Goals	Apps	Goals	Apps	Goals	Apps	Goals
Montana (loan)	2007–08	B PFG	23	0	0	0	—		—		—		23	0
Sportist Svoge (loan)	2008–09	B PFG	15	0	0	0	—		—		—		15	0
Slavia Sofia	2008–09	A PFG	9	0	0	0	—		—		—		9	0
Slavia Sofia	2009–10	A PFG	10	0	2	0	—		—		—		12	0
Slavia Sofia	2010–11	A PFG	27	1	5	1	—		—		—		32	2
Slavia Sofia	2011–12	A PFG	27	0	1	0	—		—		—		28	0
Slavia Sofia	2012–13	A PFG	26	1	4	1	—		—		—		30	2
Slavia Sofia	2013–14	A PFG	35	0	2	0	—		—		—		37	0
Slavia Sofia	Total		134	2	14	2	—		—		—		148	4
Montana (loan)	2009–10	A PFG	13	0	0	0	—		—		—		13	0
Levski Sofia	2014–15	A PFG	2	0	0	0	—		—		—		2	0
Lokomotiv Plovdiv	2014–15	A PFG	9	0	2	0	—		—		—		11	0
Botoșani	2015–16	Liga I	33	1	1	0	1	0	3 (Note: Appearances in UEFA Europa League)	0	—		38	1
Botoșani	2016–17	Liga I	15	0	0	0	0	0	—		—		15	0
Botoșani	Total		48	1	1	0	1	0	3	0	—		53	1
Universitatea Craiova	2016–17	Liga I	14	0	3	0	0	0	—		—		17	0
Universitatea Craiova	2017–18	Liga I	20	2	5	0	—		2	0	—		27	2
Universitatea Craiova	2018–19	Liga I	10	0	4	1	—		0	0	1 (Note: Appearances in Supercupa României)	0	15	1
Universitatea Craiova	Total		44	2	12	1	0	0	2	0	1	0	59	3
Sepsi OSK	2019–20	Liga I	27	0	3	0	—		—		—		30	0
Sepsi OSK	2020–21	Liga I	25	1	1	0	—		—		1 (Note: appearance in Liga I play-offs for UEFA Europa Conference League)	0	27	1
Sepsi OSK	2021–22	Liga I	35	0	6	0	—		2 (Note: Appearances in UEFA Conference League)	0	—		43	0
Sepsi OSK	2022–23	Liga I	27	0	3	0	—		4	0	1	0	35	0
Sepsi OSK	Total		114	1	13	0	—		6	0	2	0	135	1
Universitatea Cluj	2023–24	Liga I	7	0	1	0	—		—		—		8	0
Botoșani	2023–24	Liga I	3	0	—		—		—		—		3	0
Spartak Varna	2024–25	Bulgarian First League	15	0	1	0	—		—		—		16	0
Career total			427	6	44	3	1	0	11	0	3	0	486	9

=== International ===
Appearances and goals by national team and year
National team	Year	Apps	Goals
Bulgaria	2013	4	1
Total		4	1

Scores and results list Bulgaria's goal tally first, score column indicates score after each Dimitrov goal.

List of international goals scored by Radoslav Dimitrov
No.	Date	Venue	Opponent	Score	Result	Competition
1	10 September 2013	Ta' Qali Stadium, Attard, Malta	Malta	1–0	2–1	World Cup 2014 qualifying

== Honours ==
Slavia Sofia

- Bulgarian Cup runner-up: 2010–11

Universitatea Craiova

- Cupa României: 2017–18
- Supercupa României runner-up: 2018

Sepsi OSK

- Cupa României: 2021–22, 2022–23
- Supercupa României: 2022
