= 2018 Supercupa României =

- Event: 2018 Supercupa României
CFR Cluj	Universitatea Craiova
1	0
- Date: 14 July 2018
- Venue: Stadionul Ion Oblemenco, Craiova
- Man of the Match: Ciprian Deac (CFR Cluj)
- Referee: Radu Petrescu
- Attendance: 25,852
- Weather: Cloudy

The 2018 Supercupa României was the 20th edition of the Supercupa României, the annual super cup in Romania.

The game was contested by the winners of the previous season's Liga I and Cupa României competitions, CFR Cluj and Universitatea Craiova respectively. It was played at the Ion Oblemenco Stadium in Craiova, on 14 July 2018.

CFR Cluj claimed the trophy after defeating Universitatea Craiova 1–0, with Emmanuel Culio scoring the only goal of the game. Before the match, CFR had reached the Supercupa României four times, winning two (2009, 2010) and being runners-up two times (2012, 2016); U Craiova had never took part in the contest.

== Teams ==
Team	Qualification	Previous participations (bold indicates winners)
CFR Cluj	Winners of the 2017–18 Liga I	4 (**2009**, **2010**, 2012, 2016)
Universitatea Craiova	Winners of the 2017–18 Cupa României	None

== Venue ==
The Stadionul Ion Oblemenco in Craiova, Dolj County, hosted the match.

The Stadionul Ion Oblemenco was announced as the venue of the Super Cup at the Romanian Football Federation Executive Committee meeting on 7 May 2018. This was the first Supercupa României hosted in Craiova. The new Ion Oblemenco Stadium opened in November 2017. It is the home stadium of Universitatea Craiova.

The venue was chosen before the two participants were known. By winning the Romanian Cup, Universitatea Craiova earned the opportunity to play for the Supercup in their home stadium.

== Match ==
=== Details ===
14 July 2018
20:30 EEST (UTC+03)

CFR Cluj	1–0	Universitatea Craiova
Culio 78' (pen.)	Report

Ion Oblemenco, Craiova
Attendance: 25,852
Referee: Radu Petrescu (Bucharest)

**CFR Cluj**	**Universitatea Craiova**

GK	87	(Lithuania) Giedrius Arlauskis
RB	77	(Romania) Andrei Peteleu		(substituted off) 46'
CB	55	(Brazil) Paulo Vinícius
CB	30	(Romania) Andrei Mureșan	(yellow card) 31'
LB	45	(Portugal) Camora (c)	(yellow card) 36'
RCM	19	(Argentina) Emmanuel Culio
CM	28	(Romania) Ovidiu Hoban
LCM	8	(Croatia) Damjan Djoković
RW	10	(Romania) Ciprian Deac	(yellow card) 90+4'
CF	20	(Romania) George Țucudean		(substituted off) 87'
LW	27	(Romania) Sebastian Mailat		(substituted off) 55'
Substitutes:
RB	6	(Romania) Cristian Manea		(substituted on) 46'
CF	9	(Algeria) Billel Omrani		(substituted on) 55'
CAM	18	(Romania) Valentin Costache		(substituted on) 87'
Manager:
(Romania) Edward Iordănescu

GK	13	(Italy) Mirko Pigliacelli
CB	4	(Romania) Răzvan Popa	(yellow card) 76'	(substituted off) 80'
CB	24	(Romania) Florin Gardoș
CB	2	(Portugal) Tiago Ferreira
RM	30	(Bulgaria) Radoslav Dimitrov	(yellow card) 72'
CM	8	(Romania) Alexandru Mateiu
CM	23	(Bulgaria) Hristo Zlatinski
LM	11	(Romania) Nicușor Bancu
RW	14	(Croatia) Dominik Glavina		(substituted off) 65'
CF	10	(Romania) Alexandru Cicâldău
LW	28	(Romania) Alexandru Mitriță (c)	(yellow card) 29'
Substitutes:
RW	9	(Romania) Andrei Burlacu		(substituted on) 65'
CF	16	(Romania) Jovan Marković		(substituted on) 80'
Manager:
(Italy) Devis Mangia

**MAN OF THE MATCH**

- (Romania) Ciprian Deac

**MATCH OFFICIALS**

- Assistant referees:
  - Ovidiu Artene
  - Vladimir Urzică
- Fourth official:
  - Marius Avram
- Additional assistant referees:

**MATCH RULES**

- 90 minutes.
- Penalty shoot-out if scores still level.
- Seven named substitutes.
- Maximum of three substitutions.

=== Statistics ===
Overall
Statistic	CFR Cluj	Universitatea Craiova
Goals scored	1	0
Total shots	5	8
Shots on target	2	4
Ball possession	50%	50%
Corner kicks	6	6
Fouls committed	19	13
Offsides	0	0
Yellow cards	3	3
Red cards	0	0

== Post-match ==
Edward Iordănescu won his first trophy as a manager. The penalty netted by Emmanuel Culio was the first to be awarded in the competition, despite being played intermittently since 1994.

CFR Cluj's Ciprian Deac won the player of the match award, a distinction he had also received at the 2010 edition.

== See also ==
- 2018–19 Liga I
- 2018–19 Cupa României
