= Alexandru Mateiu =

Romanian footballer

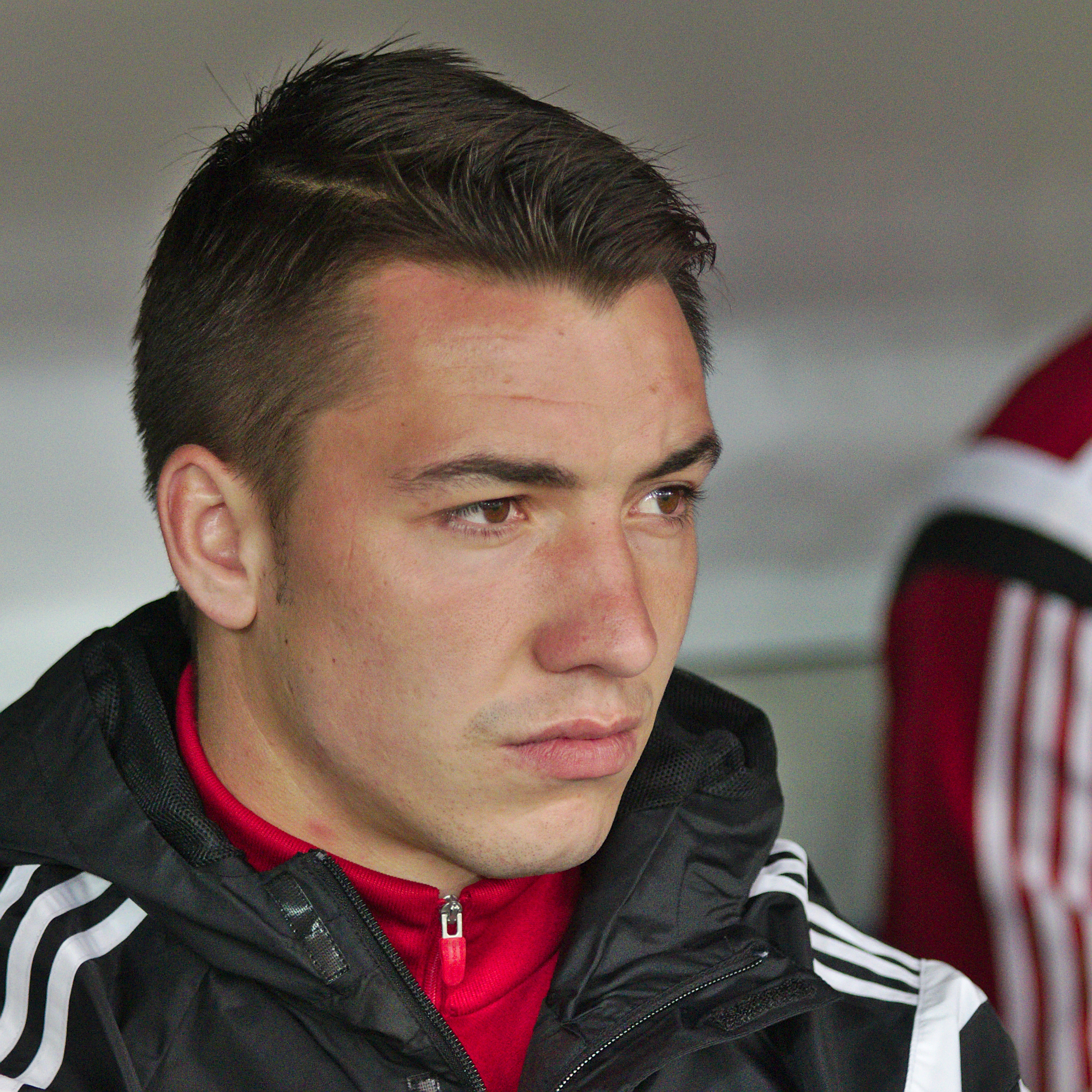
- Mateiu with Romania in 2014

Personal information
- Date of birth: 10 December 1989 (age 36)
- Place of birth: Brașov, Romania
- Height: 1.75 m (5 ft 9 in)
- Position: Midfielder

Team information
- Current team: Corona Brașov
- Number: 8

Youth career
- 1995–2009: FC Brașov

Senior career*
Years	Team	Apps	(Gls)
2008–2014	FC Brașov	90	(7)
2014–2024	Universitatea Craiova	275	(9)
2024–2026	Petrolul Ploiești	47	(1)
2026–	Corona Brașov	0	(0)

International career
2008	Romania U19	1	(0)
2014	Romania	1	(0)
- * Club domestic league appearances and goals as of 19 April 2026

Alexandru Mateiu (born 10 December 1989) is a Romanian professional footballer who plays as a midfielder for Liga III club Corona Brașov.

He spent his youth years and the first part of his senior career with hometown club FC Brașov, before signing for Universitatea Craiova in 2014. With the latter, he has since amassed over 270 matches in the Romanian first division.

Mateiu recorded his first and only appearance for the Romania national team in May 2014.

== Club career ==
Mateiu started his senior career in 2007, when he joined the first team of Brașov, which played in the Liga II. From the second half of the 2011–12 season, he established himself as a regular for "the Yellow-Blacks".

In 2014, Mateiu left his hometown club to join newly promoted CS Universitatea Craiova.

== International career ==
Mateiu made his debut for the Romania national team in a friendly game against Albania in Switzerland, in May 2014.

== Career statistics ==
=== Club ===
As of match played 19 August 2026

Appearances and goals by club, season and competition
Club	Season	League			Cupa României		Europe		Other		Total	
Club	Season	Division	Apps	Goals	Apps	Goals	Apps	Goals	Apps	Goals	Apps	Goals
FC Brașov	2007–08	Liga II	2	0	–		–		–		2	0
FC Brașov	2008–09	Liga I	0	0	0	0	–		–		0	0
FC Brașov	2009–10	Liga I	4	0	0	0	–		–		4	0
FC Brașov	2010–11	Liga I	4	1	1	0	–		–		5	1
FC Brașov	2011–12	Liga I	18	1	2	0	–		–		20	1
FC Brașov	2012–13	Liga I	30	3	1	0	–		–		31	3
FC Brașov	2013–14	Liga I	32	2	2	0	–		–		34	2
FC Brașov	Total		90	7	6	0	–		–		96	7
Universitatea Craiova	2014–15	Liga I	22	1	2	1	–		1 (Note: Appearances in Cupa Ligii)	0	25	1
Universitatea Craiova	2015–16	Liga I	30	1	1	0	—		0	0	31	1
Universitatea Craiova	2016–17	Liga I	19	1	2	0	—		1	0	22	1
Universitatea Craiova	2017–18	Liga I	30	1	6	0	2 (Note: Appearances in UEFA Europa League)	0	—		38	1
Universitatea Craiova	2018–19	Liga I	34	4	4	0	2	0	1 (Note: Appearance in Supercupa României)	0	41	4
Universitatea Craiova	2019–20	Liga I	27	0	1	0	6	1	—		34	1
Universitatea Craiova	2020–21	Liga I	26	0	4	0	1	0	—		31	0
Universitatea Craiova	2021–22	Liga I	22	1	1	0	2 (Note: Appearances in UEFA Conference League)	0	2 (Note: One appearance in Supercupa României, one appearance in Liga I European play-offs)	0	27	1
Universitatea Craiova	2022–23	Liga I	33	0	3	0	6	1	—		42	1
Universitatea Craiova	2023–24	Liga I	32	0	3	1	—		1 (Note: Appearance in Liga I European play-offs)	0	36	1
Universitatea Craiova	Total		275	9	27	2	19	2	6	0	327	13
Petrolul Ploiești	2024–25	Liga I	28	1	3	0	–		–		31	1
Petrolul Ploiești	2025–26	Liga I	19	0	3	0	–		–		22	0
Petrolul Ploiești	Total		47	1	6	0	–		–		53	1
Corona Brașov	2026–27	Liga III	0	0	3	0	–		–		3	0
Career total			412	17	42	2	19	2	6	0	479	21

=== International ===
Appearances and goals by national team and year
National team	Year	Apps	Goals
Romania
Romania	2014	1	0
Total		1	0

== Honours ==
FC Brașov

- Liga II: 2007–08

Universitatea Craiova

- Cupa României: 2017–18, 2020–21
- Supercupa României: 2021
