= Gustavo Vagenin =

Brazilian footballer (born 1991)

Personal information
- Full name: Gustavo di Mauro Vagenin
- Date of birth: 14 November 1991 (age 35)
- Place of birth: São Paulo, Brazil
- Height: 1.72 m (5 ft 8 in)
- Positions: Winger; attacking midfielder

Youth career
- –2010: Audax São Paulo

Senior career*
Years	Team	Apps	(Gls)
2010–2011	Audax São Paulo	1	(0)
2011–2014	Salernitana	68	(17)
2014–2015	Novara	15	(1)
2015	→ Lecce (loan)	13	(1)
2015–2016	Messina	26	(8)
2016–2018	Universitatea Craiova	56	(16)
2018–2020	Liaoning	39	(11)
2020–2022	Universitatea Craiova	43	(13)
2020–2021	→ Ajman (loan)	7	(0)
2022–2024	Tractor	54	(8)
2024–2025	Gol Gohar	18	(2)
- * Club domestic league appearances and goals as of 11:26, 17 August 2025 (UTC)

Gustavo di Mauro Vagenin (born 14 November 1991) is a Brazilian professional footballer who plays mainly as a winger.

Gustavo has competed professionally in four countries apart from his own, mainly Italy and Romania.

== Club career ==
Vagenin signed a two-year contract with Novara on 18 July 2014. On 2 February 2015 Gustavo and Manconi were signed by Lecce in temporary deals, with Luigi Della Rocca moved to Novara.

On 16 September 2015, he was signed by Messina.

On 5 March 2020, Vagenin rejoined Romanian club Universitatea Craiova.

On 10 August 2020, Vagenin signed by Ajman Club.

== International career ==
Vagenin received a call-up to Italy Universiade in 2013.

== Career statistics ==
As of match played 1 June 2024

Appearances and goals by club, season and competition
Club	Season	League			National cup (Note: Includes Coppa Italia Serie C, Coppa Italia, Cupa României, Hazfi Cup)		Continental		Other		Total	
Club	Season	Division	Apps	Goals	Apps	Goals	Apps	Goals	Apps	Goals	Apps	Goals
Salernitana	2012–13	Serie C	28	6	2	0	—		2	1	32	7
Salernitana	2013–14	Serie C	25	6	7	1	—		0	0	32	7
Salernitana	Total		53	12	9	1	—		2	1	64	14
Novara	2014–15	Serie C	15	1	2	0	—		0	0	17	1
Lecce	2014–15	Serie C	13	1	0	0	—		0	0	13	1
Messina	2015–16	Serie C	26	8	0	0	—		0	0	26	8
Universitatea Craiova	2016–17	Liga I	24	5	5	0	0		1 (Note: Appearance in Cupa Ligii)	0	30	5
Universitatea Craiova	2017–18	Liga I	32	11	6	3	2 (Note: Appearances in UEFA Europa League)	0	0	0	40	14
Universitatea Craiova	Total		56	16	11	3	2	0	1	0	70	19
Liaoning	2018	China League One	16	5	0		—		—		16	5
Liaoning	2019	China League One	23	6	0		—		0		23	6
Liaoning	Total		39	11	0		—		0		39	11
Universitatea Craiova	2019–20	Liga I	6	1	0		—		—		6	1
Ajman	2020–21	UAE Pro League	7	0	0				2 (Note: Appearances in UAE League Cup)	0	9	0
Universitatea Craiova	2021–22	Liga I	35	10	5	2	3 (Note: Appearances in UEFA Europa Conference League)	0	1 (Note: Appearance in Supercupa României)	0	44	12
Universitatea Craiova	2022–23	Liga I	2	2	0		2	0	0	0	4	2
Universitatea Craiova	Total		37	12	5	2	5	0	1	0	48	14
Tractor	2022–23	Persian Gulf Pro League	29	3	1	0	—		—		30	3
Tractor	2023–24	Persian Gulf Pro League	25	5	2	0	1 (Note: Appearance in AFC Champions League)	0	—		28	5
Tractor	Total		54	8	3	0	1	0	—		58	8
Career total			306	70	30	6	8	0	6	1	350	77

== Honours ==
Salernitana

- Lega Pro Seconda Divisione: 2012–13
- Serie D: 2011–12
- Coppa Italia Serie C: 2013–14

Universitatea Craiova

- Cupa României: 2017–18
- Supercupa României: 2021

Individual

- Gazeta Sporturilor Romania Player of the Month: February 2022
