= 2019–20 CS Universitatea Craiova season =

Universitatea Craiova
2019–20 season
- Chairman: Sorin Cârțu
- Manager: Corneliu Papură (until 1 September); Victor Piturca (from 1 September until 4 January 2020) Corneliu Papură (from 4 January 2020)
- Stadium: Ion Oblemenco
- Liga I: 2nd
- Cupa României: Quarter-finals
- Europa League: Third qualifying round
- Top goalscorer: League: Alexandru Cicâldău (14); All: Alexandru Cicâldău (16)
- Highest home attendance: 30,000 (vs FCSB, 15 September 2019)
- Lowest home attendance: 4,236 (vs FC Botoșani, 5 December 2019)
- Average home league attendance: 12,286
- Biggest win: Universitatea Craiova 3–0 Hermannstadt Universitatea Craiova 4–1 Dinamo București FC Voluntari 1–4 Universitatea Craiova
- Biggest defeat: CFR Cluj 2–0 Universitatea Craiova FC FCSB 2–0 Universitatea Craiova
Home colours	Away colours	Third colours

The 2019–20 season was the 44th season in Universitatea Craiova's history, and the 34th in the top-flight of Romanian football. Universitatea Craiova competed in Liga I, the Cupa României and the Europa League.

== Players ==
=== First-team squad ===
As of 12 January 2020

N	Pos.	Nat.	Name	Age	EU	Since	App	Goals	Ends	Transfer fee	Notes
13	GK	(Italy)	Mirko Pigliacelli	33	EU	2019	66	1	2022	€300k	
1	GK	(Romania)	Laurențiu Popescu	29	EU	2016	19	0	2021	Youth system	
25	GK	(Romania)	Andrei Marinescu	41	EU	2019	0	0	2021	Free	
5	DF	(Romania)	Bogdan Vatajelu (4th captain)	33	EU	2019	132	11	2023	€350k	
2	DF	(Portugal)	Tiago Ferreira	33	EU	2017	74	0	2020	Free	
18	DF	(Romania)	Ștefan Vlădoiu	27	EU	2016	12	0	Not known	Youth system	
27	MF	(Switzerland)	Ivan Martić	36	EU	2017	70	5	2020	Free	
11	DF	(Romania)	Nicusor Bancu (captain)	34	EU	2014	200	21	2020	€80k	
24	DF	(Romania)	Florin Gardos	38	EU	2018	11	1	2020	Free	
26	DF	(Ivory Coast)	Stephane Acka	36	Non-EU	2019	109	1	Not known	Free	
33	DF	(Romania)	Mihai Balasa	31	EU	2019	17	2	2023	€100k	
15	DF	(Serbia)	Uros Cosic	34	Non-EU	2019	10	1	2022	Undisclosed	
30	DF	(Romania)	Alexandru Matel	37	EU	2019	6	0	2022	€50k	
8	MF	(Romania)	Alexandru Mateiu (vice-captain)	36	EU	2014	180	10	Not known	€500k	
21	MF	(Bulgaria)	Antoni Ivanov	31	EU	2019	28	2	2022	€150k	
14	MF	(Albania)	Kamer Qaka	31	Non-EU	2019	16	0	2023	€200k	
22	MF	(Romania)	Cristian Bărbuț	31	EU	2017	80	7	2021	€100k	
10	MF	(Romania)	Alexandru Cicâldău (3rd captain)	29	EU	2018	71	15	2022	€1.0M	
23	MF	(Romania)	Vasile Constantin	28	EU	2019	7	2	Not known	Youth system	
16	MF	(Romania)	Dan Nistor	38	EU	2020	2	0	2022	€260k	
28	FW	(Romania)	Valentin Mihăilă	26	EU	2018	54	7	2021	Youth system	
19	FW	(Bosnia and Herzegovina)	Elvir Koljić	34	Non-EU	2017	27	15	2020	€450k	
7	FW	(Romania)	Mihai Roman	33	EU	2017	40	4	2020	€125k	
17	FW	(Romania)	Ștefan Baiaram	23	EU	2019	6	0	2024	Youth system	
9	FW	(Romania)	Andrei Ivan	29	EU	2019	116	21	2023	€1.5M	
38	FW	(Romania)	Luis Nitu	25	EU	2019	10	3	2024	Youth system	
4	DF	(France)	Claude Dielna	38	EU	2020	70	19	Unknown	Free	
	FW	(Brazil)	Gustavo	34	Non-EU	2020	0	0	2021	Free	

- Last updated: 17 February 2020
- Source: , Players in / out, Wikipedia players'

articles

== Preseason and friendlies ==
Win Draw Loss

22 June 2019	Orenburg (Russia)	1–1	(Romania) Universitatea Craiova
EEST (UTC+3)

25 June 2019	Qarabağ (Azerbaijan)	0–0	(Romania) Universitatea Craiova
EEST (UTC+3)

28 June 2019	Universitatea Craiova (Romania)	1–3	(Czech Republic) Viktoria Plzeň
EEST (UTC+3)

1 July 2019	Ferencváros (Hungary)	4–0	(Romania) Universitatea Craiova
EEST (UTC+3)

2 July 2019	Universitatea Craiova (Romania)	3–3	(Poland) Legia Warsaw
EEST (UTC+3)

16 November 2019	Universitatea Craiova (Romania)	2-1	(Serbia) FK Spartak Subotica	Craiova
EEST (UTC+3)	Mihai Roman 9'; Carlos Fortes 65'		Damjan Gojkov 32'

12 January 2020	Universitatea Craiova (Romania)	2-0	(Germany) Eintracht Braunschweig	Antalya
EEST (UTC+3)	Valentin Mihaila 54'; Jasmin Fejzic 84' (o.g.)

17 January 2020	FC Aarau (Switzerland)	1–0	(Romania) Universitatea Craiova	Antalya
EEST (UTC+3)	Olivier Jackle 45+3'

18 January 2020	Universitatea Craiova (Romania)	1-3	(Poland) Pogoń Szczecin	Antalya
EEST (UTC+3)	Alexandru Cicâldău 33' (pen.)		Srdjan Spiridonovic 15'; Soufian Benyamina 26'; Michalis Manias 72'

23 January 2020	Zagłębie Lubin (Poland)	3-0	(Romania) Universitatea Craiova	Antalya
EEST (UTC+3)	Rok Sirk 23'; Filip Starzynski 49'; Patryk Szysz 82'

24 January 2020	Universitatea Craiova (Romania)	3-1	(Czech Republic) Karviná	Antalya
EEST (UTC+3)	Andrei Ivan 5' (pen.); Mihai Roman 31'; Andrei Ivan 79'		Milan Rundic 46' (pen.)

<!-

== Competitions ==
Win Draw Loss

=== Overview ===
Competition	First match	Last match	Starting round	Final position	Record							
Competition	First match	Last match	Starting round	Final position	Pld	W	D	L	GF	GA	GD	Win %
Liga I	July 2019	–	Matchday 1	–	25	14	4	7	41	26	+15	56.00
Cupa României	October 2019	–	Round of 32	-	2	2	0	0	5	1	+4	100.00
Europa League	July 2019	–	First Qualifying Round	Third Qualifying Round	6	2	3	1	7	7	+0	33.33
Total					33	18	7	8	53	34	+19	54.55

Last updated: 17 February 2020
Source: Competitions

=== Liga I ===
The Liga I fixture list was announced in July 2019.

==== Regular season ====
===== Table =====
Pos	Team	Pld	W	D	L	GF	GA	GD	Pts	Qualification
1	CFR Cluj	26	15	7	4	51	16	+35	52	Qualification for the Championship round
2	Universitatea Craiova	26	14	4	8	41	28	+13	46	Qualification for the Championship round
3	Botoșani	26	12	9	5	36	30	+6	45	Qualification for the Championship round
4	FCSB	26	13	5	8	37	29	+8	44	Qualification for the Championship round
5	Gaz Metan Mediaș	26	12	7	7	34	30	+4	43	Qualification for the Championship round

Source: LPF (in Romanian), Soccerway
Rules for classification: 1) Points; 2) Head-to-head points; 3) Head-to-head goal difference; 4) Head-to-head goals scored; 5) Goal difference; 6) Goals scored; 7) Play-off.

===== Results by round =====
Round	1	2	3	4	5	6	7	8	9	10	11	12	13	14	15	16	17	18	19	20	21	22	23	24	25	26
Ground	H	A	H	A	H	A	H	A	H	A	H	H	A	A	H	A	H	A	H	A	H	A	H	A	A	H
Result	W	W	W	L	L	D	W	W	L	W	W	D	L	D	W	D	W	L	W	L	W	L	W	W	W	L
Position	3	2	2	3	5	6	5	3	3	3	2	3	3	3	3	4	3	4	3	5	4	4	3	2	2	2

Updated to match(es) played on January 2020. Source: Liga I
A = Away; H = Home; W = Win; D = Draw; L = Loss

===== Matches =====
Win Draw Loss

14 July 2019 1	Universitatea Craiova	3–2	Academica Clinceni	Craiova
	Răuță 13' (o.g.); Martić 41'; Constantin 90'		Șut 29'; Nsiah 90'	Stadium: Ion Oblemenco; Attendance: 11,000; Referee: Marian Barbu (Romania)

21 July 2019 2	Dinamo București	0–2	Universitatea Craiova	București
			Bărbuț 36'; Mihai Roman 66'	Stadium: Arena Nationala; Attendance: 7,343; Referee: Istvan Kovacs (Romania)

28 July 2019 3	Universitatea Craiova	1–0	Chindia Târgoviște	Craiova
	Mihai Roman 46'			Stadium: Ion Oblemenco; Attendance: 9,693; Referee: Horia Mladinovic (Romania)

4 August 2019 4	Hermannstadt	2–1	Universitatea Craiova	Târgu Mureș
	Petrescu 50'; Viera 54' (yellow card) 74' (yellow-red card) 87'		Constantin 3'	Stadium: Stadionul Trans-Sil; Attendance: 400; Referee: Florin Andrei (Romania)

11 August 2019 5	Universitatea Craiova	0–1	Sepsi Sfântu Gheorghe	Craiova
			Karanović 81'	Stadium: Ion Oblemenco; Attendance: 7860; Referee: George Radulescu (Romania)

18 August 2019 6	Botoșani	1–1	Universitatea Craiova	Botoșani
	Golofca 1'		Bancu 29'	Stadium: Municipal; Attendance: 4000; Referee: Ovidiu Hategan (Romania)

23 August 2019 7	Universitatea Craiova	1–0	Astra Giurgiu	Craiova
	Bancu 68'			Stadium: Ion Oblemenco; Attendance: 12,457; Referee: Horatiu Fesnic (Romania)

30 August 2019 8	Voluntari	1–2	Universitatea Craiova	Voluntari
	Ebralidze 16'; Țîră (yellow card) 37' (yellow-red card) 55'		Mihăilă 46'; Mihai Roman 86'	Stadium: Anghel Iordănescu; Attendance: 1000; Referee: Andrei Chivulete (Romania)

15 September 2019 9	Universitatea Craiova	0-1	FCSB	Craiova
			Tsoumou 88'	Stadium: Ion Oblemenco; Attendance: 30,000; Referee: Istvan Kovacs (Romania)

20 September 2019 10	Gaz Metan Mediaș	2-3	Universitatea Craiova	Mediaș
	Nicolao Dumitru 41'; Nelut Rosu 89'		Luis Nitu 6'; Bogdan Vatajelu 42'; Alexandru Cicâldău 57'	Stadium: Gaz Metan; Attendance: 2,200; Referee: Marcel Birsan (Romania)

30 September 2019 11	Universitatea Craiova	3-1	Viitorul Constanța	Craiova
	Alexandru Cicâldău 44'; Elvir Koljić 45'; Mihai Balasa 53'		Bogdan Tiru 8'	Stadium: Ion Oblemenco; Attendance: 15,383; Referee: Marius Avram (Romania)

4 October 2019 12	Universitatea Craiova	1-1	Politehnica Iași	Craiova
	Carlos Fortes 82'		Andrei Cristea 70'	Stadium: Ion Oblemenco; Attendance: 12,358; Referee: Horatiu Fesnic (Romania)

19 October 2019 13	CFR Cluj	2-0	Universitatea Craiova	Cluj-Napoca
	Lacina Traore 70'; *Billel Omrani 78'			Stadium: Dr. Constantin Rădulescu; Attendance: 6,000; Referee: Radu Petrescu (Romania)

27 October 2019 14	Academica Clinceni	0-0	Universitatea Craiova	Clinceni
				Stadium: Clinceni; Attendance: 3,000; Referee: Sorin Antonie (Romania)

4 November 2019 15	Universitatea Craiova	4-1	Dinamo București	Drobeta-Turnu Severin
	Antoni Ivanov 20'; Andrei Ivan 31'; Andrei Ivan 45+1'; Valentin Mihaila 86'		Dan Nistor 57'	Stadium: Municipal Stadium; Attendance: 12,242; Referee: Marius Avram (Romania)

9 November 2019 16	Chindia Târgoviște	1-1	Universitatea Craiova	Ploiești
	Ovidiu Bic 62'		Alexandru Cicâldău 64'	Stadium: Ilie Oană; Attendance: 2,800; Referee: Catalin Popa (Romania)

24 November 2019 17	Universitatea Craiova	3-0	Hermannstadt	Craiova
	Nicusor Bancu 39'; Alexandru Cicâldău 68'; Ousmane Viera 76' (o.g.)			Stadium: Ion Oblemenco; Attendance: 7,638; Referee: Marian Barbu (Romania)

30 November 2019 18	Sepsi Sfântu Gheorghe	1-0	Universitatea Craiova	Sfântu Gheorghe
	Pavol Šafranko 8'			Stadium: Municipal; Attendance: 2,400; Referee: Marcel Birsan (Romania)

5 December 2019 19	Universitatea Craiova	3-1	Botoșani	Craiova
	Valentin Mihaila 20'; Alexandru Cicâldău 28' (pen.); Bogdan Vatajelu 90+3'		Reagy Ofosu 39'	Stadium: Ion Oblemenco; Attendance: 4,236; Referee: Horatiu Fesnic (Romania)

8 December 2019 20	Astra Giurgiu	1-0	Universitatea Craiova	Giurgiu
	Denis Alibec 50'			Stadium: Marin Anastasovici; Attendance: 1,000; Referee: Andrei Chivulete (Romania)

14 December 2019 21	Universitatea Craiova	2-1	Voluntari	Craiova
	Alexandru Cicâldău 74'; Mihai Balasa 89'		Thanasis Papazoglou 54'	Stadium: Ion Oblemenco; Attendance: 4,500; Referee: Robert Dumitru (Romania)

21 December 2019 22	FCSB	2-0	Universitatea Craiova	Bucharest
	Dennis Man 41'; Florinel Coman 45'			Stadium: Arena Națională; Attendance: 13,210; Referee: Marcel Bîrsan (Romania)

31 January 2020 23	Universitatea Craiova	3-1	Gaz Metan Mediaș	Craiova
	Alexandru Cicâldău 7'; Alexandru Cicâldău 26'; Uros Cosic 62'		Marius Constantin 37' (pen.)	Stadium: Ion Oblemenco; Attendance: 12,926; Referee: Marius Avram (Romania)

9 February 2020 24	Viitorul Constanța	1-2	Universitatea Craiova	Ovidiu
	Gabriel Iancu 17'		Luis Nitu 25'; Valentin Mihaila 82'	Stadium: Viitorul; Attendance: 3,208; Referee: Ovidiu Hategan (Romania)

15 February 2020 25	Politehnica Iași	2-5	Universitatea Craiova	Iași
	Cosmin Frasinescu 52'; Manuel De Iriondo 69'		Luis Nitu 11'; Alexandru Cicâldău 16' (pen.); Mihai Balasa 23'; Nicusor Bancu 82'; Elvir Koljić 88'	Stadium: Emil Alexandrescu; Attendance: 2,140; Referee: Catalin Popa (Romania)

22 February 2020 26	Universitatea Craiova	0-2	CFR Cluj	Craiova
			Mario Rondon 9'; Ivan Martić 68' (o.g.)	Stadium: Ion Oblemenco; Attendance: 29,000; Referee: Marcel Bîrsan (Romania)

=== Cupa României ===
Universitatea Craiova will enter the Cupa României at the Round of 32.

==== Round of 32 ====
25 October 2019 Round of 32	CSM Reșița	0–1	Universitatea Craiova	Craiova
18:45		Summary	Luis Nitu 30'	Stadium: Stadionul Ion Oblemenco; Attendance: 6,000; Referee: Catalin Busi

==== Round of 16 ====
31 October 2019 Round of 16	FC Voluntari	1–4	Universitatea Craiova	Voluntari
21:00	Ivan Martić 32' (o.g.)	https://us.soccerway.com/matches/2019/10/31/romania/cupa-romaniei/cs-fc-petrolul-zf1948-berca/cs-u-craiova/3176521/ Summary	Valentin Mihaila 12'; Valentin Mihaila 20'; Alexandru Cicâldău 53' (pen.); Alexandru Ionita 75'	Stadium: Anghel Iordănescu; Attendance: 300; Referee: Iulian Calin

==== Quarter-finals ====
3-5 March 2020 Quarter-finals	Politehnica Iași	v	Universitatea Craiova	Iași
				Stadium: Emil Alexandrescu

=== UEFA Europa League ===
As Universitatea Craiova finished 4th in the 2018–19 Liga I, they entered the Europa League at the first qualifying round.

==== First qualifying round ====
The draw for the first round took place on 18 June. Universitatea Craiova was drawn to play against Azerbaijan 3rd place Sabail.

9 July 2019 1st Leg	Sabail (Azerbaijan)	2–3	(Romania) Universitatea Craiova	Baku
	Ramazanov 33', 82'		Mateiu 13'; Bancu 51'; Mihai Roman 67'	Stadium: ASCO Arena; Attendance: 2,550; Referee: Fyodor Zammit (Malta)

18 July 2019 2nd Leg	Universitatea Craiova (Romania)	3–2 (6–4 agg.)	(Azerbaijan) Sabail	Craiova
	Cicâldău 28'; Vătăjelu 54'; Fortes 90'		Ramazanov 67'; Duventru 69'	Stadium: Ion Oblemenco; Attendance: 15,763; Referee: Helgi Jónasson (Iceland)

==== Second qualifying round ====
Universitatea Craiova advanced to the second qualifying round. The draw for the second round took place on 19 June. Universitatea Craiova was drawn to play against Hungarian 4th place Honvéd.

25 July 2019 1st Leg	Honvéd (Hungary)	0–0	(Romania) Universitatea Craiova	Győr
				Stadium: ETO Park; Attendance: 2,720; Referee: Kevin Clancy (Scottish Football Association)

1 August 2019 2nd Leg	Universitatea Craiova (Romania)	0–0 (a.e.t.) (0–0 agg.) (3–1 p)	(Hungary) Honvéd	Craiova
				Stadium: Ion Oblemenco; Attendance: 22,134; Referee: Arnold Hunter (Northern Ireland)
	Penalties
	Ioniță (penalty scored); Fortes (penalty scored); Cicâldău (penalty scored)		(penalty missed) Kamber; (penalty missed) Batik; (penalty scored) Ngog; (penalty missed) Banó-Szabó

==== Third qualifying round ====
Universitatea Craiova advanced to the third qualifying round. The draw for the third round took place on 22 July. Universitatea Craiova was drawn to play against Greek 3rd place AEK Athens.

8 August 2019 1st Leg	Universitatea Craiova (Romania)	0–2	(Greece) AEK Athens	Craiova
			Mandalos 60'; Livaja 85'	Stadium: Ion Oblemenco; Attendance: 2,530^{1} Referee: Dennis Higler (Netherland)

15 August 2019 2nd Leg	AEK Athens (Greece)	1–1 (3–1 agg.)	(Romania) Universitatea Craiova	Athens
	Mandalos 26'		Ivanov 63'	Stadium: Athens Olympic Stadium; Referee: Jérôme Brisard (France)

Notes:
^1On 5 August 2019 UEFA banned Universitatea Craiova to attend two home games without fans following the incidents against Honved Budapest in the Second qualifying round of Europa League. In the match against AEK Athens only kids under 14 were allowed

== Statistics ==
=== Squad appearances and goals ===
Last updated on 17 February 2020.

No.	Pos	Nat	Player	Total		Liga 1		Europa League		Cupa Romaniei	
No.	Pos	Nat	Player	Apps	Goals	Apps	Goals	Apps	Goals	Apps	Goals
Goalkeepers
1	GK	(Romania) ROU	Laurențiu Popescu	8	0	6	0	0	0	2	0
13	GK	(Italy) ITA	Mirko Pigliacelli	37	0	30	0	6	0	1	0
25	GK	(Romania) ROU	Andrei Marinescu	0	0	0	0	0	0	0	0
35	GK	(Romania) ROU	Catalin Predut	0	0	0	0	0	0	0	0
Defenders
2	DF	(Portugal) POR	Tiago Ferreira	12	0	9	0	1	0	2	0
3	DF	(Romania) ROU	Marius Briceag	3	0	0	0	2	0	1	0
4	DF	(Romania) ROU	Florin Borța	2	0	2	0	0	0	0	0
4	DF	(France) FRA	Claude Dielna	2	0	2	0	0	0	0	0
5	DF	(Romania) ROU	Bogdan Vătăjelu	31	3	23	2	6	1	2	0
6	DF	(Croatia) CRO	Renato Kelić	15	0	9	0	6	0	0	0
11	DF	(Romania) ROU	Nicușor Bancu	40	5	31	4	6	1	3	0
15	DF	(Serbia) SRB	Uroš Ćosić	21	1	18	1	0	0	3	0
18	DF	(Romania) ROU	Ștefan Vlădoiu	21	0	21	0	0	0	0	0
24	DF	(Romania) ROU	Florin Gardoș	1	0	0	0	1	0	0	0
26	DF	(Ivory Coast) CIV	Stephane Acka	35	0	28	0	5	0	2	0
27	DF	(Switzerland) SUI	Ivan Martić	22	1	15	1	5	0	2	0
30	DF	(Romania) ROU	Alexandru Mățel	5	0	4	0	0	0	1	0
33	DF	(Romania) ROU	Mihai Bălașa	23	3	22	3	0	0	1	0
Midfielders
8	MF	(Romania) ROU	Alexandru Mateiu	36	1	29	0	6	1	1	0
10	MF	(Romania) ROU	Alexandru Cicâldău	41	16	33	14	5	1	3	1
14	MF	(Albania) ALB	Kamer Qaka	19	0	12	0	5	0	2	0
16	MF	(Romania) ROU	Dan Nistor	15	5	14	3	0	0	1	2
21	MF	(Bulgaria) BUL	Antoni Ivanov	32	2	26	1	6	1	0	0
22	MF	(Romania) ROU	Cristian Bărbuț	36	2	28	2	6	0	2	0
23	MF	(Romania) ROU	Vasile Constantin	7	2	4	2	3	0	0	0
31	MF	(Romania) ROU	Alexandru Ioniță	10	1	6	0	3	0	1	1
Forwards
7	FW	(Romania) ROU	Mihai Roman	20	4	15	3	5	1	0	0
9	FW	(Romania) ROU	Andrei Ivan	24	2	24	2	0	0	0	0
16	FW	(Romania) ROU	Jovan Marković	3	0	3	0	0	0	0	0
17	FW	(Romania) ROU	Ștefan Baiaram	13	0	11	0	1	0	1	0
19	FW	(Bosnia and Herzegovina) BIH	Elvir Koljić	18	6	15	6	0	0	3	0
20	FW	(Bosnia and Herzegovina) BIH	Goran Zakarić	10	0	10	0	0	0	0	0
28	FW	(Romania) ROU	Valentin Mihăilă	31	9	28	7	1	0	2	2
34	FW	(Romania) ROU	Raoul Baicu	1	0	1	0	0	0	0	0
38	FW	(Romania) ROU	Luis Nitu	13	4	11	3	0	0	2	1
99	FW	(Portugal) POR	Carlos Fortes	14	2	8	1	6	1	0	0

=== Squad statistics ===
	Liga I	Cupa României	Europa League	Home	Away	Total Stats
Games played	26	2	6	16	18	34
Games won	14	2	2	10	8	18
Games drawn	4	0	3	2	5	7
Games lost	8	0	1	4	5	9
Goals scored	41	5	7	27	26	53
Goals conceded	28	1	7	16	20	36
Goal difference	+13	+4	0	+11	+6	+17
Clean sheets	5	1	2	4	4	8
Goal by Substitute	5	0	0	3	2	5
Total shots	252	0^{1}	100	188	164	352
Shots on target	115	0^{1}	37	87	65	152
Corners	134	0^{1}	31	92	73	165
Players used	32	19	20	34	31	34
Offsides	48	0^{1}	20	39	29	68
Fouls suffered	433	0^{1}	90	269	254	523
Fouls committed	443	0^{1}	94	277	260	537
Yellow cards	70	1	13	35	49	84
Red cards	0	0	0	0	0	0
Winning rate	56,00%	100%	33,33%	66,6%	41,17%	54,54%

Last updated: 17 February 2020
Source: Competitive matches

Notes:
^1Data unavailable for 2019–20 Cupa României matches against CSM Reșița and FC Voluntari in the round of Round of 32 respectively Round of 16.

=== Goals ===
As of 17 February 2020

Rank	Player	Position	Liga 1	Cupa Romaniei	Europa League	Total
1	(Romania) Alexandru Cicâldău	MF	9	1	1	12
2	(Romania) Valentin Mihaila	FW	4	2	0	7
3	(Romania) Nicusor Bancu	DF	4	0	1	5
4	(Romania) Mihai Roman	FW	3	0	1	4
5	(Romania) Luis Nitu	FW	3	1	0	4
6	(Romania) Bogdan Vatajelu	DF	2	0	1	3
7	(Romania) Mihai Balasa	DF	3	0	0	3
8	(Romania) Andrei Ivan	FW	2	0	0	2
9	(Portugal) Carlos Fortes	FW	1	0	1	2
10	(Romania) Vasile Constantin	MF	2	0	0	2
11	(Bulgaria) Antoni Ivanov	MF	1	0	1	2
12	(Bosnia and Herzegovina) Elvir Koljić	FW	2	0	0	2
13	(Romania) Cristian Bărbuț	MF	1	0	0	1
14	(Switzerland) Ivan Martić	DF	1	0	0	1
15	(Romania) Alexandru Ioniță	MF	0	1	0	1
16	(Romania) Alexandru Mateiu	MF	0	0	1	1
16	(Serbia) Uros Cosic	DF	1	0	0	1

=== Goal minutes ===
	1'–15'	16'–30'	31'–HT	46'–60'	61'–75'	76'–FT	Extra time	Forfeit
Goals	6	9	8	8	8	9	0	0
Percentage	13.21%	20.75%	15.09%	15.09%	15.09%	20.75%	0%	0%

Last updated: 2020 (UTC)
Source: Soccerway

=== Hat-tricks ===
Player	Against	Result	Date	Competition

=== Clean sheets ===
As of 10 January 2020

Rank	Name	Liga I	Cupa României	Europa League	Total	Games played
Total		5	1	2	8	32

=== Disciplinary record ===
As of 17 February 2020

Number	Nation	Position	Name	Liga I		Cupa României		Europa League		Total	
Number	Nation	Position	Name	Yellow card	Red card	Yellow card	Red card	Yellow card	Red card	Yellow card	Red card
28	(Romania)	GK	Valentin Mihaila	8	0	0	0	1	0	9	0
11	(Romania)	DF	Nicusor Bancu	6	0	0	0	3	0	9	0
33	(Romania)	DF	Mihai Bălașa	7	0	0	0	0	0	7	0
10	(Romania)	DF	Alexandru Cicâldău	6	0	0	0	0	0	6	0
9	(Romania)	DF	Andrei Ivan	5	0	0	0	0	0	5	0
6	(Croatia)	FW	Renato Kelic	4	0	0	0	1	0	5	0
5	(Romania)	FW	Bogdan Vatajelu	2	0	1	0	2	0	5	0
14	(Albania)	MF	Kamer Qaka	3	0	0	0	1	0	4	0
7	(Romania)	FW	Mihai Roman	2	0	0	0	2	0	4	0
22	(Romania)	MF	Cristian Barbut	4	0	0	0	0	0	4	0
27	(Switzerland)	MF	Ivan Martić	3	0	0	0	1	0	4	0
15	(Serbia)	FW	Uros Cosic	4	0	0	0	0	0	4	0
8	(Romania)	DF	Alexandru Mateiu	3	0	0	0	0	0	3	0
2	(Portugal)	MF	Tiago Ferreira	3	0	0	0	0	0	3	0
21	(Bulgaria)	MF	Antoni Ivanov	3	0	0	0	0	0	3	0
26	(Ivory Coast)	MF	Stephane Acka	2	0	0	0	0	0	2	0
1	(Romania)	MF	Laurențiu Popescu	1	0	0	0	0	0	1	0
23	(Romania)	DF	Vasile Constantin	1	0	0	0	0	0	1	0
20	(Bosnia and Herzegovina)	DF	Goran Zakaric	1	0	0	0	0	0	1	0
4	(Romania)	MF	Florin Borța	1	0	0	0	0	0	1	0
18	(Romania)	MF	Ștefan Vlădoiu	1	0	0	0	0	0	1	0
31	(Romania)	DF	Alexandru Ioniță	0	0	0	0	1	0	1	0
99	(Portugal)	DF	Carlos Fortes	0	0	0	0	1	0	1	0
			TOTALS	69	0	1	0	13	0	83	0

=== Attendances ===
As of 17 February 2020

	Matches	Attendances	Average	High	Low
Liga I	13	169,282	11,690	30,000	4,236
Cupa României	0	0	0	0	0
Europa League	3	40,427	13,475	22,134	2,530
Total	16	180,709	13,021	30,000	2,530

== See also ==
- 2019–20 Cupa României
- 2019–20 Liga I
