= 2020–21 CS Universitatea Craiova season =

CS Universitatea Craiova
2020–21 season
- Owner: Mihai Rotaru
- Chairman: Sorin Cârțu
- Manager: Cristiano Bergodi (until 9 November); Corneliu Papură (10 November–30 January); Dragoș Bon (30 January–7 February); Marinos Ouzounidis (from 7 February)
- Liga I Regular season: 3rd
- Liga I Championship group: 3rd
- Cupa României: Winners
- UEFA Europa League: First qualifying round

The 2020–21 season was the 73rd in the history of Club Sportiv Universitatea Craiova. The team competed in Liga I, finished third, won the Romanian Cup, and participated in the first qualifying round of the UEFA Europa League.

Shortly after a 0–1 defeat against Chindia Târgoviște, head coach Cristiano Bergodi announced his resignation from his position. It later emerged that the resignation was for personal reasons. On 30 January 2021, the contract of coach Corneliu Papură was mutually terminated after 11 matches, in which he recorded only three victories.

== Transfers ==
=== In ===
Pos.	Player	Transferred from	Fee	Date	Source
DF	(Romania) Vladimir Screciu	(Belgium) Genk	Free	1 July 2020	
DF	(Romania) Marius Constantin	(Romania) Gaz Metan Mediaș	Undisclosed	12 August 2020	
DF	(Romania) Paul Papp	(Turkey) Sivasspor	Free	12 August 2020	
FW	(Romania) Alexandru Tudorie	(Russia) FC Arsenal Tula	Loan	12 August 2020	
MF	(Romania) Ovidiu Bic	(Romania) Chindia Târgoviște	Loan return	15 August 2020	
MF	(Romania) Mihai Căpățînă	(Romania) Voluntari	Undisclosed	5 October 2020	
MF	(Romania) Alexandru Cîmpanu	(Romania) Botoșani	Undisclosed	5 October 2020	
FW	(Croatia) Ivan Mamut	(Croatia) Inter Zaprešić	Loan	5 October 2020	
FW	(Germany) Reagy Ofosu	(Romania) Botoșani	Undisclosed	5 October 2020	
FW	(Croatia) Ivan Mamut	(Croatia) Inter Zaprešić	Undisclosed	15 January 2021	
MF	(Switzerland) Matteo Fedele	(France) Valenciennes	Free	8 February 2021	
MF	(Spain) Juan Cámara	(Poland) Jagiellonia Białystok	Loan	15 February 2021	

=== Out ===
Pos.	Player	Transferred to	Fee	Date	Source
MF	(Brazil) Gustavo Vagenin	(United Arab Emirates) Ajman	Loan	10 August 2020	
FW	(Romania) Luis Nițu	(Romania) Gaz Metan Mediaș	Undisclosed	20 August 2020	
DF	(Serbia) Uroš Ćosić	(Belarus) Shakhtyor Soligorsk	Free	17 September 2020	
MF	(Romania) Valentin Mihăilă	(Italy) Parma	€8,500,000	5 October 2020	
MF	(Albania) Kamer Qaka	(Norway) Kongsvinger	Free	12 October 2020	
MF	(Bulgaria) Antoni Ivanov	(Romania) Voluntari	Loan	18 January 2021	

== Competitions ==
=== Overall record ===
Competition	First match	Last match	Starting round	Final position	Record							
Competition	First match	Last match	Starting round	Final position	Pld	W	D	L	GF	GA	GD	Win %
Liga I Regular season	22 August 2020	11 April 2021	Matchday 1	3rd	30	16	10	4	33	14	+19	53.33
Liga I Championship group	17 April 2021	26 May 2021	Matchday 1	3rd	10	3	3	4	9	11	−2	30.00
Cupa României	27 November 2020	22 May 2021		Winners	6	5	1	0	15	4	+11	83.33
UEFA Europa League	27 August 2020		First qualifying round	First qualifying round	1	0	0	1	1	2	−1	0.00
Total					47	24	14	9	58	31	+27	51.06

Source: Competitions

=== Liga I ===
==== Regular season ====
Pos	Team	Pld	W	D	L	GF	GA	GD	Pts	Qualification
1	FCSB	30	20	5	5	57	22	+35	65	Qualification for the Play-off round
2	CFR Cluj	30	19	7	4	42	15	+27	64	Qualification for the Play-off round
3	Universitatea Craiova	30	16	10	4	33	14	+19	58	Qualification for the Play-off round
4	Sepsi OSK	30	10	15	5	43	31	+12	45	Qualification for the Play-off round
5	Academica Clinceni	30	10	14	6	30	26	+4	44	Qualification for the Play-off round

Source: LPF (in Romanian), Soccerway
Rules for classification: 1) Points; 2) Head-to-head points; 3) Head-to-head goal difference; 4) Head-to-head goals scored; 5) Goal difference; 6) Goals scored; 7) Play-off.

==== Results summary ====
Overall								Home						Away					
Pld	W	D	L	GF	GA	GD	Pts	W	D	L	GF	GA	GD	W	D	L	GF	GA	GD
30	16	10	4	33	14	+19	58	8	4	3	15	8	+7	8	6	1	18	6	+12

Last updated: complete.

===== Results by round =====
Round	1	2	3	4	5	6	7	8	9	10	11	12	13	14	15	16	17	18	19	20	21	22	23	24	25	26	27	28	29	30
Ground	A	H	A	H	A	H	A	H	A	H	A	H	A	H	A	H	A	H	A	H	A	H	A	H	A	H	A	H	A	H
Result	W	W	W	W	W	W	W	L	W	L	D	W	W	L	D	D	D	D	D	D	W	W	D	W	L	W	W	W	D	D
Position	5	3	1	1	1	1	1	1	1	2	2	2	1	2	2	3	3	3	3	3	3	3	3	3	3	3	3	3	3	3

A = Away; H = Home; W = Win; D = Draw; L = Loss

22 August 2020 1	Sepsi OSK	0–1	Universitatea Craiova

30 August 2020 2	Universitatea Craiova	2–0	Astra Giurgiu

14 September 2020 3	Viitorul Constanța	1–4	Universitatea Craiova

19 September 2020 4	Universitatea Craiova	2–1	Voluntari

25 September 2020 5	Argeș Pitești	1–2	Universitatea Craiova

2 October 2020 6	Universitatea Craiova	1–0	Politehnica Iași

18 October 2020 7	Dinamo București	0–1	Universitatea Craiova

23 October 2020 8	Universitatea Craiova	0–1	Academica Clinceni

31 October 2020 9	Hermannstadt	0–1	Universitatea Craiova

6 November 2020 10	Universitatea Craiova	0–1	Chindia Târgoviște

21 November 2020 11	Botoșani	0–0	Universitatea Craiova

7 December 2020 12	Universitatea Craiova	3–1	Gaz Metan Mediaș

14 December 2020 13	UTA Arad	1–2	Universitatea Craiova

18 December 2020 14	Universitatea Craiova	0–2	FCSB

22 December 2020 15	CFR Cluj	0–0	Universitatea Craiova

12 January 2021 16	Universitatea Craiova	0–0	Sepsi OSK

18 January 2021 17	Astra Giurgiu	1–1	Universitatea Craiova

23 January 2021 18	Universitatea Craiova	1–1	Viitorul Constanța

26 January 2021 19	Voluntari	1–1	Universitatea Craiova

29 January 2021 20	Universitatea Craiova	1–1	Argeș Pitești

2 February 2021 21	Politehnica Iași	0–3	Universitatea Craiova

6 February 2021 22	Universitatea Craiova	1–0	Dinamo București

14 February 2021 23	Academica Clinceni	0–0	Universitatea Craiova

19 February 2021 24	Universitatea Craiova	1–0	Hermannstadt

27 February 2021 25	Chindia Târgoviște	1–0	Universitatea Craiova

6 March 2021 26	Universitatea Craiova	1–0	Botoșani

12 March 2021 27	Gaz Metan Mediaș	0–2	Universitatea Craiova

16 March 2021 28	Universitatea Craiova	2–0	UTA Arad

4 April 2021 29	FCSB	0–0	Universitatea Craiova

11 April 2021 30	Universitatea Craiova	0–0	CFR Cluj

==== Championship group ====
Pos	Team	Pld	W	D	L	GF	GA	GD	Pts	Qualification
1	CFR Cluj (C)	10	7	1	2	15	5	+10	54	Qualification to Champions League first qualifying round
2	FCSB	10	3	3	4	13	14	−1	45	Qualification to Europa Conference League second qualifying round
3	Universitatea Craiova	10	3	3	4	9	11	−2	41	Qualification to Europa Conference League second qualifying round
4	Sepsi (O)	10	5	2	3	11	8	+3	40	Qualification to European competition play-offs
5	Academica Clinceni	10	3	2	5	10	15	−5	33	
6	Botoșani	10	3	1	6	13	18	−5	31	

Source: , FRF (in Romanian), LPF (in Romanian)
Rules for classification: 1) Points; 2) Points without rounding; 3) Head-to-head points; 4) Head-to-head goal difference; 5) Head-to-head goals scored; 6) Goal difference; 7) Goals scored; 8) Play-off (only if needed to decide champion or teams for UEFA competitions). (Note: only criteria 6 and 7 are applied to establish the classification during the competition.)
(C) Champions; (O) Play-off winners

Round	1	2	3	4	5	6	7	8	9	10
Ground	H	A	A	H	A	A	H	H	A	H
Result	D	D	W	W	L	L	L	L	W	D
Position	3	3	3	3	3	3	3	4	3	3

A = Away; H = Home; W = Win; D = Draw; L = Loss

==== Results summary ====
Overall								Home						Away					
Pld	W	D	L	GF	GA	GD	Pts	W	D	L	GF	GA	GD	W	D	L	GF	GA	GD
10	3	3	4	9	11	−2	12	1	2	2	5	6	−1	2	1	2	4	5	−1

Last updated: complete.

17 April 2021 1	Universitatea Craiova	0–0	Sepsi OSK

21 April 2021 2	Botoșani	1–1	Universitatea Craiova

24 April 2021 3	CFR Cluj	1–2	Universitatea Craiova

29 April 2021 4	Universitatea Craiova	2–0	FCSB

2 May 2021 5	Academica Clinceni	1–0	Universitatea Craiova

5 May 2021 6	Sepsi OSK	2–0	Universitatea Craiova

9 May 2021 7	Universitatea Craiova	2–3	Botoșani

15 May 2021 8	Universitatea Craiova	1–3	CFR Cluj

19 May 2021 9	FCSB	0–1	Universitatea Craiova

26 May 2021 10	Universitatea Craiova	0–0	Academica Clinceni

=== Cupa României ===
27 November 2020	Progresul Spartac	0–5	Universitatea Craiova

11 February 2021 Round of 16	Botoșani	0–1	Universitatea Craiova

2 March 2021 Quarter-finals	Chindia Târgoviște	0–1	Universitatea Craiova

14 April 2021 Semi-finals; First leg	Universitatea Craiova	3–0	Pandurii Târgu Jiu

12 May 2021 Semi-finals; Second leg	Pandurii Târgu Jiu	2–2 (2–5 agg.)	Universitatea Craiova

22 May 2021 Final	Astra Giurgiu	2–3 (a.e.t.)	Universitatea Craiova

=== UEFA Europa League ===
==== Qualifying rounds ====
27 August 2020 First qualifying round	Locomotive Tbilisi (Georgia (country))	2–1	(Romania) Universitatea Craiova	Tbilisi, Georgia
	Sikharulidze 57'; Oulad Omar 61'	Report	Baiaram 90+4'	Stadium: Mikheil Meskhi Stadium; Referee: Miloš Đorđić (Serbia)
