= 2019–20 Cupa României =

Cupa României 2019–20
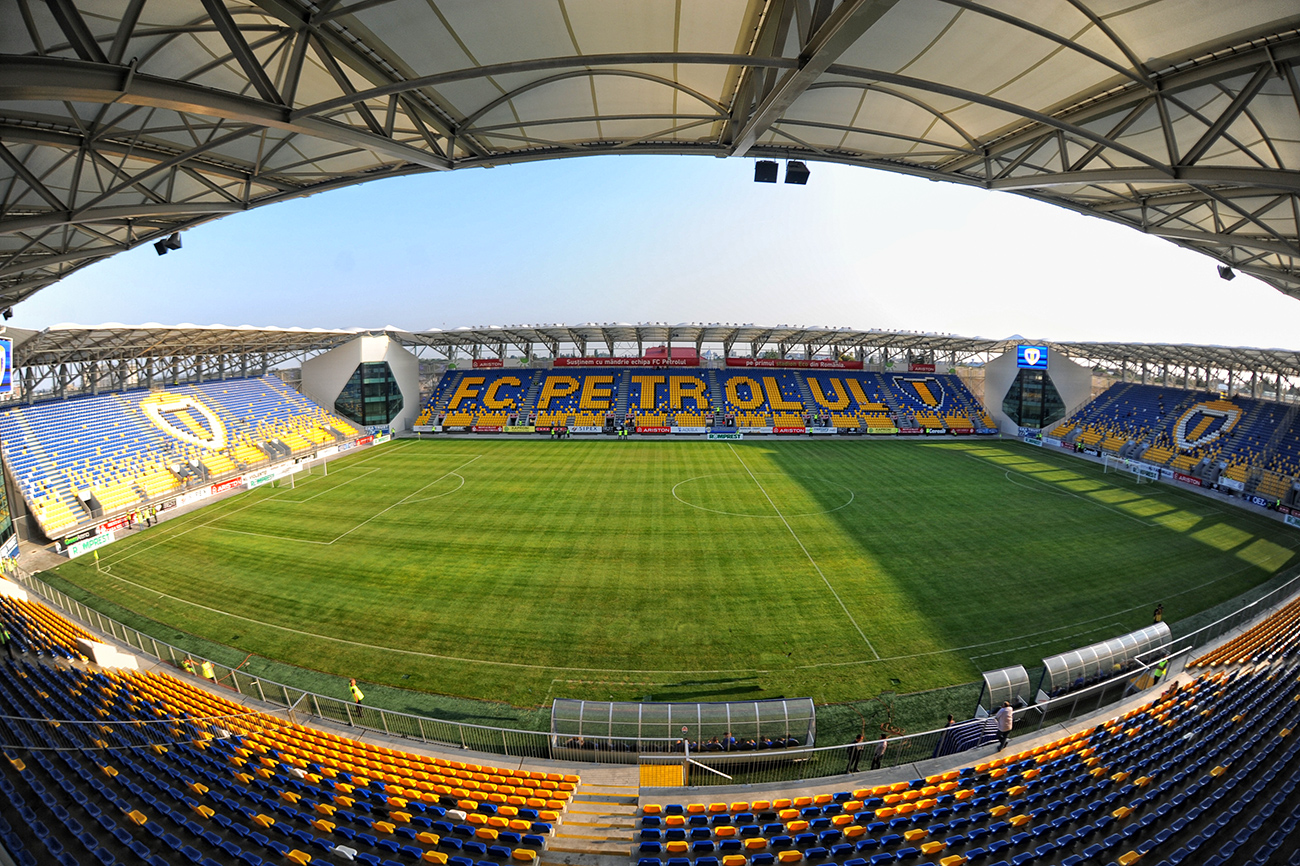

Tournament details
- Country: Romania
- Teams: 145

Final positions
- Champions: FCSB
- Runners-up: Sepsi OSK

The 2019–20 Cupa României was the 82nd season of the annual Romanian primary football knockout tournament. The winner will qualify for the first qualifying round of the 2020–21 UEFA Europa League. Times up to 26 October 2019 and from 29 March 2020 are EEST (UTC+3). Times between 27 October 2019 and 28 March 2020 are EET (UTC+2).

== Participating clubs ==
The following 145 teams qualified for the competition:

2018–19 Liga I all clubs (14)	2018–19 Liga II all clubs (20)	2018–19 Liga III; Without second teams and some dissolved clubs (69)
CFR Cluj; FCSB; Viitorul Constanța; Universitatea Craiova; Astra Giurgiu; Sepsi OSK; Gaz Metan Mediaș; Botoșani; Dinamo București; Politehnica Iași; Voluntari; Hermannstadt; Dunărea Călărași; Concordia Chiajna	Chindia Târgoviște; Academica Clinceni; Universitatea Cluj; Petrolul Ploiești; Sportul Snagov; Argeș Pitești; Mioveni; Luceafărul Oradea; Metaloglobus București; ASU Politehnica Timișoara; Daco-Getica București; Ripensia Timișoara; UTA Arad; Farul Constanța; Pandurii Târgu Jiu; Energeticianul; Aerostar Bacău; Poli Timișoara; Balotești; Dacia Unirea Brăila	SCM Gloria Buzău; Rapid București; Turris Turnu Măgurele; CSM Reșița; Miercurea Ciuc; Bucovina Rădăuți; Afumați; FC U Craiova; Șoimii Lipova; Comuna Recea; Oțelul Galați; Progresul Spartac București; Flacăra Horezu; Dumbrăvița; Minaur Baia Mare; Știința Miroslava; Unirea Slobozia; Alexandria; Gloria Lunca-Teuz Cermei; Olimpic Cetate Râșnov; Foresta Suceava; Popești-Leordeni; Filiași; Metalurgistul Cugir; Sănătatea Cluj; Focșani; Tunari; Pucioasa; Național Sebiș; Avântul Reghin; Metalul Buzău; Înainte Modelu; Crișul Chișineu-Criș; Sticla Arieșul Turda; Sporting Liești; Făurei; SR Brașov; Avrig; KSE Târgu Secuiesc; Axiopolis Cernavodă; Unirea Bascov; Hunedoara; 1. FC Gloria; Ceahlăul Piatra Neamț; Medgidia; Industria Galda; Odorheiu Secuiesc; Șomuz Fălticeni; Flacăra Moreni; Ghiroda; Unirea Dej; Unirea Alba Iulia; Hărman; Agricola Borcea; Pașcani; Sportul Chiscani; Vedița Colonești; Cetate Deva; Unirea Tășnad; Râmnicu Sărat; Oltenița; Sporting Roșiori; Millenium Giarmata; MSE Târgu Mureș; Sănătatea Darabani; Lugoj; Viitorul Domnești; Ocna Mureș; Iernut
42 representatives of regional associations^{1}
Voința Stremț (Alba); Progresul Pecica (Arad); Real Bradu (Argeș); Viitorul Curița (Bacău); Sânmartin (Bihor); Dumitra (Bistrița-Năsăud); Avântul Albești (Botoșani); Precizia Săcele (Brașov); Viitorul Ianca (Brăila); CSA Steaua București (Bucharest); Avântul Zărnești (Buzău); Voința Lupac (Caraș-Severin); Mostiștea Ulmu (Călărași); Florești (Cluj)	Victoria Cumpăna (Constanța); Păpăuți (Covasna); Recolta Gura Șuții (Dâmbovița); Cârcea (Dolj); CSU Galați (Galați); Mihai Bravu (Giurgiu); Unirea Crușeț (Gorj); Gheorgheni (Harghita); Inter Petrila (Hunedoara); Bărăganul Ciulnița (Ialomița); Unirea Mircești (Iași); Vulturii Pasărea (Ilfov); Progresul Șomcuta Mare (Maramureș); Strehaia (Mehedinți)	Unirea Ungheni (Mureș); Bradu Borca (Neamț); CSM Slatina (Olt); Blejoi (Prahova); Olimpia MCMXXI (Satu Mare); SCM Zalău (Sălaj); Măgura Cisnădie (Sibiu); Viitorul Liteni (Suceava); Ajax Botoroaga (Teleorman); Avântul Periam (Timiș); Pescărușul Sarichioi (Tulcea); CSM Vaslui (Vaslui); Minerul Costești (Vâlcea); Mausoleul Mărășești (Vrancea)

== Round and draw dates ==
Round	Draw date	First match date
First Round	19 July 2019	31 July 2019
Second Round	7 August 2019	14 August 2019
Third Round	21 August 2019	28 August 2019
Fourth Round	4 September 2019	10 September 2019
Round of 32	12 September 2019	24 September 2019
Round of 16	30 September 2019	29 October 2019
Quarter-finals	10 February 2020	3 March 2020
Semi-finals	10 June 2020	24 June 2020
Final	10 June 2020	22 July 2020

== Preliminary rounds ==
The first rounds, and any preliminaries, are organised by the Regional Leagues.

== First round ==
All matches were played on 31 July 2019.

Team 1	Score	Team 2
31 July 2019
Viitorul Albești (4)	3–9	Sănătatea Darabani (4)
Viitorul Liteni (4)	4–3	Șomuz Fălticeni (3)
Unirea Mircești (4)	6–2	Pașcani (3)
Bradu Borca (4)	w/o	Ceahlăul Piatra Neamț (3)
CSM Vaslui (4)	1–4	Viitorul Curița (4)
Avântul Zărnești (4)	w/o	Mausoleul Mărășești (4)
Gheorgheni (4)	0–7	Odorheiu Secuiesc (3)
Păpăuți (4)	1–3 (a.e.t.)	KSE Târgu Secuiesc (3)
Viitorul Ianca (3)	5–0	Sportul Chiscani (4)
CSU Galați (3)	4–1	Sporting Liești (3)
Râmnicu Sărat (4)	1–2 (a.e.t.)	Făurei (3)
Pescărușul Sarichioi (4)	2–1	Medgidia (3)
Bărăganul Ciulnița (4)	2–1	Agricola Borcea (3)
CSA Steaua București (4)	8–0	Mihai Bravu (4)
Vulturii Pasărea (4)	w/o	Viitorul Domnești (4)
Blejoi (3)	0–2 (a.e.t.)	Flacăra Moreni (3)
Precizia Săcele (4)	2–1	Hărman (4)
Mostiștea Ulmu (3)	w/o	Oltenița (4)
Ajax Botoroaga (4)	5–3	Sporting Roșiori (4)
Recolta Gura Șuții (4)	1–2 (a.e.t.)	Real Bradu (4)
Minerul Costești (4)	2–1 (a.e.t.)	Unirea Bascov (3)
CSM Slatina (3)	1–3	Vedița Colonești (3)
Cârcea (4)	2–0 (a.e.t.)	Strehaia (4)
Unirea Crușeț (4)	0–5	Inter Petrila (4)
Cetate Deva (3)	0–9	Hunedoara (3)
Voința Lupac (4)	6–3	Lugoj (4)
Millenium Giarmata (4)	1–2	Ghiroda (3)
Avântul Periam (4)	1–2	Progresul Pecica (3)
Măgura Cisnădie (4)	3–2	Avrig (4)
Voința Stremț (4)	0–5	Unirea Alba Iulia (3)
Ocna Mureș (4)	0–2 (a.e.t.)	Industria Galda (3)
Sânmartin (3)	8–2	Unirea Tășnad (4)
Olimpia MCMXXI (4)	w/o	SCM Zalău (3)
Florești (4)	4–2	Iernut (4)
Unirea Ungheni (4)	12–2	MSE Târgu Mureș (4)
Dumitra (4)	w/o	1. FC Gloria (3)
Progresul Șomcuta Mare (4)	2–6	Unirea Dej (3)
Victoria Cumpăna (4)	6–0	Axiopolis Cernavodă (3)

== Second round ==
All matches were played on 14 and 15 August 2019.

Team 1	Score	Team 2
14 August 2019
CSA Steaua București (4)	2–1	Mostiștea Ulmu (3)
Sănătatea Darabani (4)	w/o	Foresta Suceava (3)
Viitorul Liteni (4)	2–2 (a.e.t.) (3–4 p)	Ceahlăul Piatra Neamț (3)
Unirea Mircești (4)	3–2	Știința Miroslava (3)
Viitorul Curița (4)	0–1	KSE Târgu Secuiesc (3)
CSU Galați (3)	1–2	Focșani (3)
Avântul Zărnești (4)	w/o	Metalul Buzău (3)
Viitorul Ianca (3)	2–3	Făurei (3)
Bărăganul Ciulnița (4)	2–5	Unirea Slobozia (3)
Înainte Modelu (3)	0–5	Popești-Leordeni (3)
Viitorul Domnești (4)	0–9	Tunari (3)
Flacăra Moreni (3)	4–1 (a.e.t.)	Pucioasa (3)
Precizia Săcele (4)	1–6	Olimpic Cetate Râșnov (3)
Ajax Botoroaga (4)	1–3	Alexandria (3)
Real Bradu (4)	w/o	Vedița Colonești (3)
Cârcea (4)	3–4	Filiași (3)
Minerul Costești (4)	2–3	Flacăra Horezu (3)
Inter Petrila (4)	3–2	Metalurgistul Cugir (3)
Voința Lupac (4)	1–0	Hunedoara (3)
Ghiroda (3)	3–1	Dumbrăvița (3)
Progresul Pecica (3)	2–3	Crișul Chișineu-Criș (3)
Național Sebiș (3)	0–2	Gloria Lunca-Teuz Cermei (3)
Olimpia MCMXXI (4)	0–5	Sânmartin (3)
Unirea Alba Iulia (3)	1–2	Industria Galda (3)
Florești (4)	0–4	Unirea Dej (3)
Sticla Arieșul Turda (3)	2–3	Sănătatea Cluj (3)
Măgura Cisnădie (4)	2–0	SR Brașov (3)
Unirea Ungheni (4)	2–1	Odorheiu Secuiesc (3)
Victoria Cumpăna (4)	3–0	Pescărușul Sarichioi (4)
15 August 2019
1. FC Gloria (3)	1–3	Avântul Reghin (3)

== Third round ==
All matches were played on 27, 28 and 29 August 2019.

Team 1	Score	Team 2
27 August 2019
Făurei (3)	3–1	Dacia Unirea Brăila (3)
Vedița Colonești (3)	3–1	Filiași (3)
Voința Lupac (4)	0–4	Ripensia Timișoara (2)
Unirea Mircești (4)	1–1 (a.e.t.) (2–4 p)	Aerostar Bacău (3)
Ghiroda (3)	6–1	ACS Poli Timișoara (3)
Șoimii Lipova (3)	0–1	UTA Arad (2)
Sânmartin (3)	4–1	Luceafărul Oradea (3)
Unirea Dej (3)	0–3	Sănătatea Cluj (3)
Unirea Ungheni (4)	3–5 (a.e.t.)	Avântul Reghin (3)
Alexandria (3)	0–2	Turris Turnu Măgurele (2)
28 August 2019
Minaur Baia Mare (3)	0–2	Comuna Recea (3)
Foresta Suceava (3)	3–0	Bucovina Rădăuți (3)
Ceahlăul Piatra Neamț (3)	0–1	Miercurea Ciuc (2)
Focșani (3)	3–1 (a.e.t.)	Oțelul Galați (3)
KSE Târgu Secuiesc (3)	0–2	Olimpic Cetate Râșnov (3)
Metalul Buzău (3)	0–0 (a.e.t.) (3–2 p)	SCM Gloria Buzău (2)
Flacăra Moreni (3)	3–1	Progresul Spartac București (3)
CSA Steaua București (4)	4–0	Balotești (3)
Popești-Leordeni (3)	1–1 (a.e.t.) (4–3 p)	Afumați (3)
Tunari (3)	1–0	Unirea Slobozia (3)
Rapid București (2)	2–1	Daco-Getica București (2)
Flacăra Horezu (3)	2–0	Pandurii Târgu Jiu (2)
Inter Petrila (4)	1–5	CSM Reșița (2)
Crișul Chișineu-Criș (3)	6–0	Gloria Lunca-Teuz Cermei (3)
Măgura Cisnădie (4)	1–1 (a.e.t.) (3–5 p)	Industria Galda (3)
FCU Craiova (3)	2–2 (a.e.t.) (6–5 p)	Viitorul Târgu Jiu (2)
29 August 2019
Victoria Cumpăna (4)	0–3	Farul Constanța (2)

== Fourth round ==
All matches were played on 10 and 11 September 2019.

Team 1	Score	Team 2
10 September 2019
Crișul Chișineu-Criș (3)	1–3	UTA Arad (2)
Foresta Suceava (3)	2–1	Aerostar Bacău (3)
Ghiroda (3)	1–3	Ripensia Timișoara (2)
Flacăra Moreni (3)	1–2	Mioveni (2)
Popești-Leordeni (3)	1–2	Turris Turnu Măgurele (2)
Sănătatea Cluj (3)	3–1	Comuna Recea (3)
Vedița Colonești (3)	1–2 (a.e.t.)	FC U Craiova (3)
11 September 2019
Olimpic Cetate Râșnov (3)	0–1 (a.e.t.)	Miercurea Ciuc (2)
CSM Reșița (2)	1–0	ASU Politehnica Timișoara (2)
Făurei (3)	2–1	Farul Constanța (2)
Flacăra Horezu (3)	2–1	Argeș Pitești (2)
Industria Galda (3)	4–3	Avântul Reghin (3)
Metalul Buzău (3)	1–0 (a.e.t.)	Focșani (3)
Sânmartin (3)	1–2	Universitatea Cluj (2)
Sportul Snagov (2)	0–1	Petrolul Ploiești (2)
CSA Steaua București (4)	1–2 (a.e.t.)	Concordia Chiajna (2)
Tunari (3)	0–2	Metaloglobus București (2)
Rapid București (2)	3–0	Dunărea Călărași (2)

== Round of 32 ==
The matches were played on 24, 25 and 26 September 2019.

24 September 2019	Flacăra Horezu (3)	0–2	Astra Giurgiu (1)	Horezu
16:30 EEST (UTC+3)		Report	V. Gheorghe 44'; Ajayi 83'	Stadium: Treapt; Attendance: 1,500; Referee: Robert Avram (Pitești)

24 September 2019	Foresta Suceava (3)	2–1	Gaz Metan Mediaș (1)	Suceava
16:30 EEST (UTC+3)	Drugă 41'; Martin 44'	Report	Buș 8'	Stadium: Areni; Attendance: 3,000; Referee: Vlad Băban (Iași)

24 September 2019	UTA Arad (2)	1–3	Dinamo București (1)	Arad
16:30 EEST (UTC+3)	Moise 19'	Report	Moldoveanu 13'; Nistor 58'; Neicuțescu 82'	Stadium: Motorul; Attendance: 4,000; Referee: Horațiu Feșnic (Cluj-Napoca)

24 September 2019	Metalul Buzău (3)	1–0	Miercurea Ciuc (2)	Buzău
16:30 EEST (UTC+3)	Grăjdan 45+1'	Report		Stadium: Cornel Negoescu; Attendance: 500; Referee: Marius Naidin (Pitești)

24 September 2019	Turris Turnu Măgurele (2)	2–3	Academica Clinceni (1)	Turnu Măgurele
18:00 EEST (UTC+3)	Pațurcă 64' (pen.); Negruț 90+1'	Report	Ion 38'; Barbu 77' (pen.); Deretti 84'	Stadium: Municipal; Attendance: 2,000; Referee: Ionuț Coza (Bucharest)

24 September 2019	Concordia Chiajna (2)	2–3	Voluntari (1)	Chiajna
19:15 EEST (UTC+3)	Nica 2'; Bari 53'	Report	Benzar 17'; Achim 43'; Țîră 60'	Stadium: Concordia; Attendance: 200; Referee: Sorin Antonie (Bucharest)

24 September 2019	FC U Craiova (3)	2–3 (a.e.t.)	Universitatea Cluj (2)	Craiova
21:30 EEST (UTC+3)	Bălan 6', 14'	Report	Telcean 41'; Rafa 51', 95'	Stadium: Ion Oblemenco; Attendance: 10,000; Referee: Adrian Costreie (Buftea)

25 September 2019	Chindia Târgoviște (1)	0–1	Hermannstadt (1)	Ploiești
16:00 EEST (UTC+3)		Report	Joálisson 87' (pen.)	Stadium: Ilie Oană; Attendance: 500; Referee: Mihai Amorăriței (Câmpina)

25 September 2019	Făurei (3)	1–5	Mioveni (2)	Făurei
16:30 EEST (UTC+3)	Bălan 47'	Report	Celea 50'; Anghelina 57', 75'; Hergheligiu 87' (pen.); Coșereanu 89'	Stadium: Orășenesc; Attendance: 700; Referee: Sergiu Anton (Bucharest)

25 September 2019	Industria Galda (3)	0–1	Petrolul Ploiești (2)	Galda de Jos
16:30 EEST (UTC+3)		Report	Younés 32'	Stadium: Galda Arena; Attendance: 800; Referee: Constantin Olaru (Rm. Vâlcea)

25 September 2019	CSM Reșița (2)	0–1	Universitatea Craiova (1)	Craiova
18:45 EEST (UTC+3)		Report	Nițu 30'	Stadium: Ion Oblemenco; Attendance: 6,000; Referee: Cătălin Buși (Rm. Vâlcea)

25 September 2019	Botoșani (1)	2–2 (a.e.t.) (4–2 p)	CFR Cluj (1)	Botoșani
21:30 EEST (UTC+3)	Aškovski 37'; Rodríguez 81' (pen.)	Report	Golofca 56'; Burcă 60'	Stadium: Municipal; Attendance: 2,000; Referee: Andrei Chivulete (Bucharest)
	Penalties
	Rodríguez (penalty scored); Cîmpanu (penalty missed); Holzmann (penalty scored); Cascini (penalty scored); Pierce (penalty scored)		(penalty scored) Mureșan; (penalty scored) Djoković; (penalty missed) Aurélio; (penalty missed) Mailat

26 September 2019	Sănătatea Cluj (3)	1–0	Viitorul Constanța (1)	Cluj-Napoca
16:30 EEST (UTC+3)	Rus 13'	Report		Stadium: Cluj Arena; Attendance: 500; Referee: Szabolcs Kovács (Carei)

26 September 2019	Ripensia Timișoara (2)	1–4	Sepsi OSK (1)	Timișoara
16:30 EEST (UTC+3)	Toma 29'	Report	Carnat 10'; Ben Moussa 25'; Flores 32'; Adebanjo 85'	Stadium: Electrica; Attendance: 200; Referee: Rareș Vidican (Satu Mare)

26 September 2019	Rapid București (2)	0–1	Politehnica Iași (1)	Buzău
18:45 EEST (UTC+3)		Report	Cristea 65' (pen.)	Stadium: Municipal; Attendance: 5,000; Referee: Iulian Dima (Bucharest)

26 September 2019	Metaloglobus București (2)	0–2	FCSB (1)	Voluntari
21:30 EEST (UTC+3)		Report	Moruțan 14'; Man 40'	Stadium: Anghel Iordănescu; Attendance: 1,500; Referee: Adrian Cojocaru (Galați)

== Round of 16 ==
The matches were played on 29, 30 and 31 October 2019.

29 October 2019	Mioveni (2)	0–2	Hermannstadt (1)	Mioveni
18:15 EET (UTC+2)		Report	Offenbacher 65'; Persano 90+1'	Stadium: Orășenesc; Attendance: 1,000; Referee: Adrian Comănescu (Rm. Vâlcea)

29 October 2019	Universitatea Cluj (2)	0–1	FCSB (1)	Cluj-Napoca
21:00 EET (UTC+2)		Report	Hora 12'	Stadium: Cluj Arena; Attendance: 13,243; Referee: Andrei Chivulete (Bucharest)

30 October 2019	Academica Clinceni (1)	2–0	Botoșani (1)	Clinceni
14:30 EET (UTC+2)	Patriche 34'; Nsiah 84'	Report		Stadium: Clinceni; Attendance: 100; Referee: Lucian Rusandu (Sfântu Gheorghe)

30 October 2019	Sănătatea Cluj (3)	0–7	Petrolul Ploiești (2)	Cluj-Napoca
17:00 EET (UTC+2)		Report	Younés 16'; Gavrilă 23', 44', 62'; Marinescu 78'; Blănaru 80'; Arnăutu 84'	Stadium: Cluj Arena; Attendance: 1,000; Referee: Rareș Vidican (Satu Mare)

30 October 2019	Foresta Suceava (3)	0–4	Dinamo București (1)	Suceava
19:30 EET (UTC+2)		Report	Grigore 9'; Perović 62', 87'; Moldoveanu 70'	Stadium: Areni; Attendance: 7,000; Referee: Adrian Cojocaru (Galați)

31 October 2019	Metalul Buzău (3)	0–3	Politehnica Iași (1)	Buzău
14:30 EET (UTC+2)		Report	Popadiuc 20'; Horșia 49'; Hațiegan 81'	Stadium: Cornel Negoescu; Attendance: 800; Referee: Horia Mladinovici (Bucharest)

31 October 2019	Sepsi OSK (1)	4–2	Astra Giurgiu (1)	Sfântu Gheorghe
18:15 EET (UTC+2)	Fülöp 2'; Karanović 28', 57'; Konongo 49'	Report	Biceanu 16'; Bègue 62'	Stadium: Municipal; Attendance: 1,500; Referee: Radu Petrescu (Bucharest)

31 October 2019	Voluntari (1)	1–4	Universitatea Craiova (1)	Voluntari
21:00 EET (UTC+2)	Martić 32' (o.g.)	Report	Mihăilă 12', 20'; Cicâldău 53' (pen.); Ioniță 75'	Stadium: Anghel Iordănescu; Attendance: 300; Referee: Iulian Călin (Ștefănești)

== Quarter-finals ==
The matches were played on 3, 4 and 5 March 2020.

3 March 2020	Academica Clinceni (1)	0–1	Dinamo Bucuresti (1)	Bucharest
20:00 EET (UTC+2)			Sorescu 85'	Stadium: Dinamo; Attendance: 1,000; Referee: Radu Petrescu

4 March 2020	Petrolul Ploiești (2)	0–1	Sepsi OSK (1)	Ploiești
17:30 EET (UTC+2)			Dumiter 35'	Stadium: Ilie Oană; Attendance: 5,800; Referee: Iulian Călin

4 March 2020	Politehnica Iași (1)	3–2	Universitatea Craiova (1)	Iași
20:30 EET (UTC+2)	Breeveld 13', 90+2'; Horșia 42'		Nistor 55' (pen.), 90'	Stadium: Emil Alexandrescu; Attendance: 5,000; Referee: Andrei Florin Chivulete

5 March 2020	Hermannstadt (1)	1–2	FCSB (1)	Sibiu
20:00 EET (UTC+2)	Debeljuh 75'		Luchin 84' (o.g.); Coman 90'	Stadium: Municipal; Attendance: 4,000; Referee: George Găman

== Semi-finals ==
The semi-final matches are played in a round-trip system. The first legs will be played on 24 June 2020 and the second legs will be played on 8 July 2020.

Team 1	Agg.	Team 2	1st leg	2nd leg
Sepsi OSK (1)	8–1	Politehnica Iași (1)	5–1	3–0
Dinamo București (1)	0–4	FCSB (1)	0–3	0–1

=== 1st leg ===
24 June 2020	Sepsi OSK (1)	5–1	Politehnica Iași (1)	Sfântu Gheorghe
EET (UTC+3)	Achahbar 25', 75'; L. Fülöp 52'; Carnat 79'; Karanović 86'	Report	A. Cristea 5' (pen.)	Stadium: Municipal; Attendance: 0 Referee: Ovidiu Hațegan

25 June 2020	Dinamo București (1)	0–3	FCSB (1)	Bucharest
20:00 EET (UTC+3)		Report	Popa 32'; Olaru 74'; Dumitru 82'	Stadium: Dinamo; Attendance: 0 Referee: István Kovács

=== 2nd leg ===
9 July 2020	Politehnica Iași (1)	0–3 (1–8 agg.)	Sepsi OSK (1)	Iași
15:30 EET (UTC+3)		Report	Fülöp 20'; Achahbar 50'; Karanović 86'	Stadium: Emil Alexandrescu; Attendance: 0 Referee: Florin Andrei

8 July 2020	FCSB (1)	1–0 (4–0 agg.)	Dinamo București (1)	Bucharest
15:30 EET (UTC+3)	Petre 2'	Report		Stadium: Arena Națională; Attendance: 0 Referee: Horațiu Feșnic

== Final ==
22 July 2020	Sepsi OSK (1)	0–1	FCSB (1)	Ploiești
20:00 EET (UTC+3)		Report	Man 65'	Stadium: Ilie Oană Stadium; Attendance: 0 Referee: Sebastian Colțescu

Cupa României 2019–20 winners

24th title
