= CS Făurei =

Romanian football club

- Full name: Clubul Sportiv Făurei
- Nicknames: Alb-Albaștrii (The White and Blues)
- Short name: Făurei
- Founded: 22 March 2002; 24 years ago
- Ground: Orășenesc
- Capacity: 1,000
- Owner: Făurei Town
- Chairman: Aurel Nicoliță
- Manager: Alexandru Balaban
- League: Liga IV
- 2025–26: Liga IV, Brăila County, 1st of 9
Home colours	Away colours

Clubul Sportiv Făurei, commonly known as CS Făurei, or simply as Făurei, is a Romanian amateur football club based in Făurei, Brăila County, founded in 2002. The club is currently playing in the Liga IV.

Owner, manager and also player of the team is former Romanian international Bănel Nicoliță.

== History ==
CS Făurei was founded on 22 March 2002 to continue the football tradition in the town, football tradition started by Unirea Făurei, team that had as the best performance two consecutive seasons in the Divizia C, in the early 1990s.

Făurei is an important railway node in Romania, the 5th in the country according to the number of connections with other localities, of which three double, electrified lines. In the immediate vicinity and partly on its administrative territory is located the largest railway ring in South-Eastern Europe, inaugurated in the 1970s. Despite its important role in the transportation, Făurei is not an economical force in Romania, being ninth smallest city and the football team was also mainly a fourth tier team, even in the time of communism. After the dissolution of the historical team, Unirea, CS Făurei continued to play in the Liga IV reaching only meteorically Liga III, in the 2000s.

In 2016 Bănel Nicoliță, former player of Steaua București, Saint-Étienne or FC Nantes, among others, who is originally from Făurei, took over the club with the objective to promote back in the Liga III. After a first season in which "the white and blues" were ranked only 2nd, CS Făurei won Liga IV – Brăila County series, went to the promotion play-off, where after a 7–4 on aggregate against CSU Galați, promoted back in the Liga III, after an absence of 12 years.

== Grounds ==
CS Făurei plays its home matches on Orășenesc Stadium in Făurei, Brăila County, with a capacity of 1,000 seats.

== Honours ==
Liga IV – Brăila County

- Winners (2): 2004–05, 2017–18
- Runners-up (1): 2016–17

Cupa României – Brăila County

- Winners (1): 2017–18
- Runners-up (1): 2016–17

=== Unirea Făurei ===
Liga IV – Brăila County

- Winners (1): 1989–90

== League history ==
Season	Tier	Division	Place	Notes	Cupa României
2022–23	4	Liga IV (BR)	8th		First Round
2021–22	3	Liga III (Seria II)	9th	Relegated	First Round
2020–21	3	Liga III (Seria II)	10th		
2019–20	3	Liga III (Seria II)	8th		Round of 32
2018–19	3	Liga III (Seria II)	8th		
2017–18	4	Liga IV (BR)	1st (C)	Promoted	
2016–17	4	Liga IV (BR)	2nd		
2015–16	4	Liga IV (BR)	9th		
2014–15	4	Liga IV (BR)	8th		

Season	Tier	Division	Place	Notes	Cupa României
2013–14	4	Liga IV (BR)	5th		
2012–13	4	Liga IV (BR)	10th		
2011–12	4	Liga IV (BR)	11th		
2010–11	4	Liga IV (BR)	9th		
2009–10	4	Liga IV (BR)	10th		
2008–09	4	Liga IV (BR)			
2007–08	4	Liga IV (BR)	3rd		
2006–07	4	Liga IV (BR)	5th		
2005–06	3	Divizia C (Seria II)	13th	Relegated	
2004–05	4	Divizia D (BR)	1st (C)	Promoted	
