= 2018–19 CS Universitatea Craiova season =

Universitatea Craiova
2018–19 season
- Chairman: Marcel Popescu
- Manager: Devis Mangia
- Stadium: Ion Oblemenco
- Liga I: 4th
- Cupa României: Semi-finals
- Supercupa României: Runners-up
- Europa League: Third qualifying round
- Top goalscorer: League: Elvir Koljić; Alexandru Mitriță (13 each); All: Elvir Koljić (14)
Home colours	Away colours	Third colours

The 2018–19 season was the 48th season of competitive football by Universitatea Craiova. Craiova competed in the Liga I, Cupa României and Europa League.

== Previous season positions ==
	Competition	Position
(European Union)	UEFA Europa League	Third qualifying round
(Romania)	Liga I	3rd
(Romania)	Cupa României	Winners

== Players ==
=== Transfers ===
==== In ====
Date	Pos.	Player	Age	Moving from	Fee	Notes	Source
4 June 2018	DF	(Romania) Florin Gardoș	29	(England) Southampton	Free agent	Previously on loan. Signed for two years.	
6 July 2018	MF	(Romania) Alexandru Cicâldău	20	(Romania) Viitorul Constanța	€750.000	Signed for four years.	
25 July 2018	DF	(Ghana) (Italy) Isaac Donkor	22	(Italy) Cesena	Free agent	Signed for three years.	
23 August 2018	GK	(Romania) Eduard Stăncioiu	37	(Romania) FCSB	Undisclosed.	Signed for one year.	

==== Loans in ====
Date	Pos.	Player	Age	Moving from	Fee	Notes	Source

==== Out ====
Date	Pos.	Player	Age	Moving to	Fee	Notes	Source

==== Loans out ====
Date	Pos.	Player	Age	Moving to	Fee	Notes	Source

== Preseason and friendlies ==
Win Draw Loss

24 June 2018 Friendly	Universitatea Craiova	0–1	(Japan) V-Varen Nagasaki	Fulpmes, Austria
19:00 CEST (UTC+2)		Report	Nakamura 26'	Stadium: Sportplatz Fulpmes

30 June 2018 Friendly	Universitatea Craiova	2–3	(Russia) FC Ufa	Kirchdorf in Tirol, Austria
19:00 CEST (UTC+2)	Mitriță 11'; Marković 69'	Report	Paurević 44'; Krotov 73'; Icboun 89'	Stadium: Kirchdorf Sportplatz

== Competitions ==
Win Draw Loss

=== Overview ===
Competition	First match	Last match	Starting round	Final position	Record							
Competition	First match	Last match	Starting round	Final position	Pld	W	D	L	GF	GA	GD	Win %
Liga I	23 July 2018	–	Matchday 1	–	1	0	1	0	0	0	+0	0.00
Cupa României	October 2018	–	Round of 32	–	0	0	0	0	0	0	+0	—
Supercupa României	14 July 2018	–	Final	Final	1	0	0	1	0	1	−1	0.00
Europa League	9 August 2018	16 August 2018	Third round	Third round	2	0	1	1	2	4	−2	0.00
Total					4	0	2	2	2	5	−3	0.00

Last updated: 13 July 2018
Source: Competitions

=== Liga I ===
The Liga I fixture list was announced on 5 July 2018.

==== Regular season ====
===== Table =====
Pos	Team	Pld	W	D	L	GF	GA	GD	Pts	Qualification
1	CFR Cluj	26	15	9	2	39	16	+23	54	Qualification for the Championship round
2	FCSB	26	14	7	5	49	29	+20	49	Qualification for the Championship round
3	Universitatea Craiova	26	13	6	7	43	24	+19	45	Qualification for the Championship round
4	Astra Giurgiu	26	11	9	6	36	23	+13	42	Qualification for the Championship round
5	Viitorul Constanța	26	11	5	10	26	27	−1	38	Qualification for the Championship round

Source: LPF (in Romanian), Soccerway
Rules for classification: 1) Points; 2) Head-to-head points; 3) Head-to-head goal difference; 4) Head-to-head goals scored; 5) Goal difference; 6) Goals scored; 7) Play-off.

===== Results summary =====
Overall								Home						Away					
Pld	W	D	L	GF	GA	GD	Pts	W	D	L	GF	GA	GD	W	D	L	GF	GA	GD
26	13	6	7	43	24	+19	45	7	4	2	20	9	+11	6	2	5	23	15	+8

Last updated: 4 March 2019.
Source: Liga I

===== Results by round =====
Round	1	2	3	4	5	6	7	8	9	10	11	12	13	14	15	16	17	18	19	20	21	22	23	24	25	26
Ground	H	A	H	A	H	A	H	A	H	A	H	H	A	A	H	A	H	A	H	A	H	A	H	A	A	H
Result	D	L	D	W	L	W	W	L	W	D	D	W	W	W	D	L	W	W	W	L	W	D	W	W	L	L
Position	9																									3

Updated to match(es) played on 13 July 2018. Source: Liga I
A = Away; H = Home; W = Win; D = Draw; L = Loss

===== Matches =====
Win Draw Loss

23 July 2018 1	Universitatea Craiova	0–0	Politehnica Iași	Craiova
21:00 EEST (UTC+3)		Report	M.Chelaru (yellow card) 16'; Cioinac (yellow card) 39'; Panțîru (yellow card) 69'; D.Rusu (yellow card) 82'	Stadium: Ion Oblemenco; Attendance: 12,000; Referee: Horațiu Feșnic (Cluj)

29 July 2018 2	Sepsi Sfântu Gheorghe	1–0	Universitatea Craiova	Sfântu Gheorghe
18:00 EEST (UTC+3)	O.Viera (yellow card) 9'; S.Drăghici (yellow card) 34'; Vașvari (yellow card) 45'; Tandia 61'; G.de Moura (yellow card) 83'	Report	A.Mitriță (yellow card) 67'	Stadium: Municipal; Attendance: 3,000; Referee: Iulian Călin

3 August 2018 3	Universitatea Craiova	2–2	FC Botoșani	Craiova
21:00 EEST (UTC+3)	A.Burlacu (yellow card) 13'; A.Mitriță 21' (pen.), 35'	Report	Fülöp 11' (yellow card) 45+2'; M.A.Roman (yellow card) 17'; G.Miron 54'; E.Pap (yellow card) 70'	Stadium: Ion Oblemenco; Attendance: 8,500; Referee: Andrei Chivulete

12 August 2018 4	Dunărea Călărași	1–3	Universitatea Craiova	Călărași
15:30 EEST (UTC+3)	C.N.Pușcaș (yellow card) 7'; Ndiaye 63'	Report	Kelić (yellow card) 5'; Fedele 45'; A.Mitriță 53' (pen.), 73'; Cicâldău (yellow card) 67'	Stadium: Ion Comșa; Attendance: 7,530; Referee: Ovidiu Hațegan

20 August 2018 5	Universitatea Craiova	0–1	Concordia Chiajna	Craiova
21:00 EEST (UTC+3)	Donkor (red card) 19'; A.Mitriță (yellow card) 23'; Mateiu (yellow card) 53'; Bancu (yellow card) 59'	Report	Guessan (yellow card) 21'; Grădinaru (yellow card) 33'; Batin (yellow card) 36'; G.Matei (yellow card) 67'; Gorobsov 81' (yellow card) 82'	Stadium: Ion Oblemenco; Attendance: 12,000; Referee: Ionuţ Coza

27 August 2018 6	FC Voluntari	1–5	Universitatea Craiova	Voluntari
21:00 EEST (UTC+3)	Ricardinho (yellow card) 67'; Laïdouni 86' (pen.); Căpățînă (yellow card) 90+1'	Report	Bancu 24', 42', 88' (pen.); Kelić 28'; A.Mitriță 40'; Cicâldău (yellow card) 84'	Stadium: Anghel Iordănescu; Attendance: 2,500; Referee: Marius Avram

1 September 2018 7	Universitatea Craiova	3–0	Dinamo București	Craiova
21:30 EEST (UTC+3)	Fedele (yellow card) 32'; A.Mitriță (yellow card) 42' (goal) 70', 76'; Bancu (yellow card) 45'; Koljić 45+2'; Briceag (yellow card) 81'	Report	Cooper (yellow card) 38'	Stadium: Ion Oblemenco; Attendance: 25,000; Referee: Marcel Bîrsan (Bucharest)

15 September 2018 8	Gaz Metan Mediaș	3–2	Universitatea Craiova	Mediaș
21:00 EEST (UTC+3)	V.Crețu (yellow card) 5'; Fortes (yellow card) 7' (goal) 26'; M.Constantin 11' (pen.); I.Cristea (yellow card) 42' (goal) 82'; Pleșca (yellow card) 70'; Fofana (yellow card) 75'	Report	A.Mitriță (yellow card) 6' (goal) 8' (pen.), 63'; C.Bărbuț (yellow card) 35'; Kelić (yellow card) 64'; Koljić 75' (pen.); Fedele (red card) 90'	Stadium: Gaz Metan; Attendance: 3,000; Referee: Andrei Chivulete

22 September 2018 9	Universitatea Craiova	2–0	Viitorul Constanța	Craiova
21:00 EEST (UTC+3)	Koljić 5', 48'; Kelić (yellow card) 69'; Pigliacelli (yellow card) 82'	Report	Țîru (yellow card) 47'; I.Hagi (yellow card) 56'; S.Mladen (yellow card) 79'; T.Băluță (yellow card) 88'	Stadium: Ion Oblemenco; Attendance: 15,000; Referee: Radu Petrescu

1 October 2018 10	CFR Cluj	0–0	Universitatea Craiova	Cluj-Napoca
21:00 EEST (UTC+3)	Culio (yellow card) 67'; Camora (yellow card) 85'	Report	Briceag (yellow card) 38'; V.Mihăilă (yellow card) 45'; Cicâldău (yellow card) 55'; Donkor (yellow card) 57'; A.Mitriță (yellow card) 90'	Stadium: Dr. Constantin Rădulescu; Attendance: 3,500; Referee: István Kovács (Carei)

6 October 2018 11	Universitatea Craiova	1–1	Hermannstadt	Craiova
18:00 EEST (UTC+3)	Cicâldău (yellow card) 27'; Koljić 45+2' (pen.); Donkor (yellow card) 90+2'	Report	Blănaru 7'; Dandea (yellow card) 40'; D.Tătar (yellow card) 45+1'; Căbuz (yellow card) 90+3'	Stadium: Ion Oblemenco; Attendance: 12,000; Referee: Iulian Călin

21 October 2018 12	Universitatea Craiova	2–1	FCSB	Craiova
21:00 EEST (UTC+3)	Mateiu (yellow card) 44'; Fedele (yellow card) 45+3' (goal) 72'; Koljić 50', 88'; I.Martić (yellow card) 90+4'	Report	Kelić 8' (o.g.); F.Tănase (yellow card) 31'; D.Nedelcu (yellow card) 45+3'; J.Morais (red card) 87'; R.Benzar (yellow card) 90+2'	Stadium: Ion Oblemenco; Attendance: 30,000; Referee: Marcel Bîrsan (Bucharest)

26 October 2018 13	Astra Giurgiu	0–3	Universitatea Craiova	Giurgiu
21:00 EEST (UTC+3)	Alibec (yellow card) 1'	Report	A.Mitriță 38'; Cicâldău 62'; Koljić 72'	Stadium: Marin Anastasovici; Attendance: 2,500; Referee: Alexandru Tudor (Bucharest)

2 November 2018 14	Politehnica Iași	0–3	Universitatea Craiova	Iași
21:00 EET (UTC+2)	L.Rus (red card) 10'; Qaka (yellow card) 81'; Cioinac (yellow card) 90'	Report	Bancu (yellow card) 24'; A.Mitriță (yellow card) 40' (goal) 53'; Mateiu 47'; Koljić 70'	Stadium: Emil Alexandrescu; Attendance: 1,000; Referee: Andrei Chivulete

9 November 2018 15	Universitatea Craiova	1–1	Sepsi Sfântu Gheorghe	Craiova
21:00 EET (UTC+2)	Fedele 28'; C.Bărbuț (yellow card) 34'; I.Martić (yellow card) 46' (yellow-red card) 90+4'; A.Mitriță (yellow card) 52' (yellow-red card) 57'; A.Burlacu 83'; Donkor (yellow card) 87'	Report	G.de Moura (yellow card) 29'; Karnitsky 36'; D.Sato (yellow card) 86'; I.Jovanović (yellow card) 90+1'	Stadium: Ion Oblemenco; Attendance: 14,000; Referee: Radu Petrescu

26 November 2018 16	FC Botoșani	2–1	Universitatea Craiova	Botoșani
20:30 EET (UTC+2)	Fabbrini 25'; Fülöp 35'; Patache (yellow card) 54'; Golofca (yellow card) 65'	Report	V.Mihăilă (yellow card) 18'; R.Dimitrov (yellow card) 34'; C.Bărbuț (yellow card) 39'; Kelić (yellow card) 46'; Bancu (yellow card) 68'; Mateiu 79'	Stadium: Municipal; Attendance: 1,000; Referee: István Kovács (Carei)

2 December 2018 17	Universitatea Craiova	1–0	Dunărea Călărași	Craiova
17:00 EET (UTC+2)	Mateiu 23'; Bancu (yellow card) 34'; Pigliacelli (yellow card) 57'; Donkor (yellow card) 64'; A.Mitriță (yellow card) 69'; Cicâldău (yellow card) 82'; Koljić (yellow card) 90+2'	Report	Ndiaye (yellow card) 60'; Gligorov (yellow card) 87'	Stadium: Ion Oblemenco; Attendance: 7,000; Referee: Andrei Chivulete

6 December 2018 18	Concordia Chiajna	1–3	Universitatea Craiova	Chiajna
20:00 EET (UTC+2)	Ropotan 27' (yellow card) 84'; Gorobsov (yellow card) 63'	Report	Koljić 24' (pen.) (yellow card) 67'; C.Bărbuț 32'; Cicâldău 39'; T.Ferreira (yellow card) 58'	Stadium: Concordia; Attendance: 800; Referee: Marcel Bîrsan (Bucharest)

10 December 2018 19	Universitatea Craiova	3–1	FC Voluntari	Craiova
20:00 EET (UTC+2)	Koljić 26'; A.Mitriță (yellow card) 40' (goal) 45+2' (pen.); Nuno Rocha 90+1'	Report	Laïdouni (yellow card) 7' (yellow-red card) 89'; Gadze 11'; Răuță (yellow card) 33'	Stadium: Ion Oblemenco; Attendance: 6,000; Referee: Adrian Comănescu

15 December 2018 20	Dinamo București	3–0	Universitatea Craiova	Bucharest
20:00 EET (UTC+2)	Montini 30', 48', 53'; Corbu (yellow card) 47'; Hanca (yellow card) 61'; Pešić (yellow card) 65'; Salomão (yellow card) 84'	Report		Stadium: Dinamo; Attendance: 500; Referee: Marius Avram

19 December 2018 21	Universitatea Craiova	2–0	Gaz Metan Mediaș	Craiova
20:00 EET (UTC+2)	Mateiu (yellow card) 25'; A.Mitriță 52', 87' (pen.)	Report	Fofana (yellow card) 24' (yellow-red card) 32'; Nasser Chamed (yellow card) 76'	Stadium: Ion Oblemenco; Attendance: 3,500; Referee: Horațiu Feșnic (Cluj)

3 February 2019 22	Viitorul Constanța	0–0	Universitatea Craiova	Ovidiu
20:00 EET (UTC+2)	Houri (yellow card) 9'; Kuipers (yellow card) 30'; Vînă (yellow card) 90+3'	Summary	Donkor (yellow card) 2'; Kelić (yellow card) 33'; Dimitrov (yellow card) 45'	Stadium: Viitorul; Attendance: 4,500; Referee: Marcel Bîrsan

10 February 2019 23	Universitatea Craiova	2–0	CFR Cluj	Craiova
21:00 EET (UTC+2)	Cristea 14'; Kelić (yellow card) 36'; Koljić 78'	Summary	Manea (yellow card) 59'; Arlauskis (yellow card) 86'; Omrani (yellow card) 88'; Lang (yellow card) 90+2'	Stadium: Ion Oblemenco; Attendance: 28,000; Referee: Ovidiu Hațegan

16 February 2019 24	Hermannstadt	0–1	Universitatea Craiova	Pitești
14:00 EET (UTC+2)	Stoica (yellow card) 29'	Summary	Nuno Rocha 67'; Mateiu (yellow card) 75'; Pigliacelli (yellow card) 90+2'	Stadium: Stadionul Nicolae Dobrin; Attendance: 3,500; Referee: Radu Petrescu

24 February 2019 25	FCSB	3–2	Universitatea Craiova	Bucharest
20:00 EET (UTC+2)	Júnior Morais (yellow card) 24'; Hora 27' 84' (pen.); Filip 49'; Bălașa (yellow card) 72'; Man (red card) 86'	Summary	Fedele (yellow card) 26'; Pigliacelli 39' (pen.); Carlos Fortes (yellow card) 41'; Briceag (yellow card) 44' (yellow-red card); Bărbuț 46'; Koljić (yellow card) 53'; Bancu (yellow card) 68'; Kelić (red card) 82'	Stadium: Arena Națională; Attendance: 18.576; Referee: Marius Avram

4 March 2019 26	Universitatea Craiova	1–2	Astra Giurgiu	Craiova
20:00 EET (UTC+2)	Koljić 49'	Summary	Llullaku 76'; Belu-Iordache (yellow card) 86'; Donkor 87' (o.g.); Radunović (yellow card) 90+1'; Cestor (yellow card) 90+2'; Bejan (yellow card) 90+4'	Stadium: Ion Oblemenco; Attendance: 15,000; Referee: Iulian Călin

==== Championship round ====
===== Table =====
Pos	Team	Pld	W	D	L	GF	GA	GD	Pts	Qualification
1	CFR Cluj (C)	10	7	2	1	15	4	+11	50	Qualification to Champions League first qualifying round
2	FCSB	10	7	2	1	18	6	+12	48	Qualification to Europa League first qualifying round
3	Viitorul Constanța	10	6	2	2	18	10	+8	39	Qualification to Europa League second qualifying round
4	Universitatea Craiova	10	4	1	5	8	10	−2	36	Qualification to Europa League first qualifying round
5	Astra Giurgiu	10	2	0	8	6	20	−14	27	
6	Sepsi OSK	10	0	1	9	5	20	−15	20	

Source: Soccerway, Romanian Football Federation
Rules for classification: 1) Points; 2) Points without rounding; 3) Head-to-head points; 4) Head-to-head goal difference; 5) Head-to-head goals scored; 6) Goal difference; 7) Goals scored; 8) Play-off (only if needed to decide champion or teams for UEFA competitions). (Note: only criteria 6 and 7 are applied to establish the classification during the competition.)
(C) Champions

===== Results summary =====
Overall								Home						Away					
Pld	W	D	L	GF	GA	GD	Pts	W	D	L	GF	GA	GD	W	D	L	GF	GA	GD
10	4	1	5	8	10	−2	13	2	1	2	3	4	−1	2	0	3	5	6	−1

Last updated: 18 May 2019.
Source: Liga I

===== Position by round =====
Round	1	2	3	4	5	6	7	8	9	10
Ground	H	A	A	H	A	A	H	H	A	H
Result	W	W	L	D	L	W	W	L	L	L
Position	3	3	3	3	3	3	3	4	4	4

Updated to match(es) played on 18 May 2019. Source: Liga I
A = Away; H = Home; W = Win; D = Draw; L = Loss

===== Matches =====
Win Draw Loss

10 March 2019 1	Universitatea Craiova	1–0	Astra Giurgiu	Craiova
20:30 EET (UTC+2)	Koljić 18'; Martić (yellow card) 43'; Kelić (yellow card) 73'; Mihăilă (yellow card) 80'; Drăghici (yellow card) 84'	Summary	Bègue (yellow card) 27'; Zoua (yellow card) 60'; Radunović (red card) 79'; Romário (yellow card) 90+2'	Stadium: Ion Oblemenco; Attendance: 14,000; Referee: István Kovács (referee)

15 March 2019 2	Sepsi Sfântu Gheorghe	0–1	Universitatea Craiova	Sfântu Gheorghe
20:30 EET (UTC+2)	Hamed (yellow card) 90+2'	Summary	Mateiu 20'; Tiago Ferreira (yellow card) 45'; Bărbuț (yellow card) 71'	Stadium: Municipal; Attendance: 2,500; Referee: Andrei Florin Chivulete

31 March 2019 3	FCSB	3–2	Universitatea Craiova	Bucharest
	Hora 8'; Man 30'; Gnohéré 70'; Planić (yellow card) 90+1'	Summary	Bancu (yellow card) 14' (goal) 23' (pen.); Cicâldău 45+2'; Mateiu (yellow card) 53'; Bărbuț (yellow card) 90+2'	Stadium: Arena Națională; Attendance: 21,730; Referee: Ovidiu Hațegan

7 April 2019 4	Universitatea Craiova	0–0	CFR Cluj	Craiova
	Bancu (yellow card) 8'; Kelić (yellow card) 46'	Summary	Deac (yellow card) 29'; Manea (yellow card) 90+2'	Stadium: Ion Oblemenco; Attendance: 21,000; Referee: Marius Avram

13 April 2019 5	Viitorul Constanța	2–1	Universitatea Craiova	Ovidiu
	hagi 43'; Ghiță (yellow card) 56'; Rivaldinho 57'; Ganea (yellow card) 63'	Summary	Mihăilă (yellow card) 7'; Bărbuț 9'; Carlos Fortes (yellow card) 62'; Martić (yellow card) 90+4'	Stadium: Viitorul; Attendance: 3,500; Referee: Radu Petrescu

19 April 2019 6	Astra Giurgiu	0–1	Universitatea Craiova	Giurgiu
	Alibec (yellow card) 57'	Summary	Carlos Fortes (yellow card) 33'; Bancu (yellow card) 63'; Mihăilă 68'; Martić (yellow card) 90+2'	Stadium: Marin Anastasovici; Attendance: 800; Referee: Andrei Florin Chivulete

29 April 2019 7	Universitatea Craiova	1–0	Sepsi Sfântu Gheorghe	Craiova
	Cicâldău 57'; Mihăilă (yellow card) 78'	Report	Tandia (yellow card) 15'; Fejér (yellow card) 48'; Flores (yellow card) 52'	Stadium: Ion Oblemenco; Attendance: 7,000; Referee: Horia Gabriel Mladinovici

5 May 2019 8	Universitatea Craiova	0–2	FCSB	Craiova
	Dimmitrov (yellow card) 11'; Donkor (yellow card) 32'; Kelić (yellow card) 33'; Pigliacelli (yellow card) 35'; Bancu (yellow card) 63'; Mihăilă (yellow card) 86'	Report	Planić (yellow card) 20'; Hora (yellow card) 33'; Tănase 35' (pen.); Benzar (yellow card) 36'; Coman (yellow card) 58'; Júnior Morais (yellow card) 69'; Filip (yellow card) 88'; Man 90+6'	Stadium: Ion Oblemenco; Attendance: 27,000; Referee: István Kovács (referee)

12 May 2019 9	CFR Cluj	1–0	Universitatea Craiova	Cluj-Napoca
	Culio 12' (pen.); Djoković (yellow card) 34'; Boli (yellow card) 71'	Summary	Donkor (yellow card) 37'; Kelić (yellow card) 48'	Stadium: Dr. Constantin Rădulescu; Attendance: 12,000; Referee: Ovidiu Hațegan

18 May 2019 10	Universitatea Craiova	1–2	Viitorul Constanța	Craiova
	Martić 15' (yellow card) 51'; Bancu (yellow card) 71'; Tiago Ferreira (red card) 73'; Carlos Fortes (yellow card) 90+4'	Report	Mihăilă 70' (o.g.); Ghiță (yellow card) 72'; Tîrcoveanu (yellow card) 72'; Rivaldinho (yellow card) 81'; Drăguș 90+3'	Stadium: Ion Oblemenco; Attendance: 10,000; Referee: Marcel Bîrsan

=== Cupa României ===
Universitatea Craiova will enter the Cupa României at the Round of 32.

==== Round of 32 ====
25 September 2018 Round of 32	Sportul Snagov	0–2	Universitatea Craiova	Craiova
18:45	Ayoub Tazouti (yellow card) 78'; Vlad Bărbulescu (yellow card) 90+3'	Summary	Gardoș 36'; Marković 74'	Stadium: Stadionul Ion Oblemenco; Attendance: 10,000; Referee: Horia Mladinovici

==== Round of 16 ====
30 October 2018 Round of 16	Turris Turnu Măgurele	1–4	Universitatea Craiova	Turnu Măgurele
19:00	Gabriel Mărioara (yellow card) 2'; Juncănaru (yellow card) 28'; Alexandru Fotescu (yellow card) 33' (goal) 33'	Summary	Donkor 49'; Bancu 51'; Mateiu (yellow card) 75'; Burlacu 79'; Briceag (yellow card) 83'; Cicâldău 88'	Stadium: Stadionul Municipal; Attendance: 2,000; Referee: Eduard Ioniţă

==== Quarter-finals ====
28 February 2019 Quarter-finals	Miercurea Ciuc	0–3	Universitatea Craiova	Miercurea Ciuc
19:00	Lalić (yellow card) 57'; Vereș (yellow card) 86'	Summary	Donkor (yellow card) 14'; Dimitrov 27'; Bic (yellow card) 78'; Bărbuț 80'; Koljić 90+2'	Stadium: Stadionul Municipal; Attendance: 2,000; Referee: Iulian Dima

==== Semi-finals ====
4 April 2019 First leg	Universitatea Craiova	1–2	Viitorul Constanța	Craiova
19:00	Bancu 5'; Mateiu (yellow card) 39'; Briceag (yellow card) 40'; Cicâldău (yellow card) 81'; Kelić (yellow card) 86'	Summary	Iacob (yellow card) 63'; Houri 77'; Hagi (yellow card) 79'; Mladen (yellow card) 83'; Rivaldinho 89' (yellow card) 89'	Stadium: Stadionul Ion Oblemenco; Attendance: 10,000; Referee: Horatiu Mircea Fesnic

25 April 2019 Second leg	Viitorul Constanța	2–0 (4–1 agg.)	Universitatea Craiova	Ovidiu
18:45	Hagi 6' 86'; Boboc (yellow card) 30'	Summary	Cicâldău (yellow card) 7'; Bărbuț (yellow card) 57'; Carlos Fortes (yellow card) 66'; Bancu (yellow card) 90'	Stadium: Stadionul Viitorul; Attendance: 4,000; Referee: Radu Petrescu

=== Supercupa României ===
Universitatea Craiova will play in the Romanian supercup as winners of the Cupa României.

14 July 2018 Final	CFR Cluj	1–0	Universitatea Craiova	Ion Oblemenco, Craiova
20:30 EET (UTC+02)	Culio 78' (pen.)

=== UEFA Europa League ===
As winners of the 2017–18 Cupa României, Universitatea Craiova will enter the Europa League at the third qualifying round.

==== Third qualifying round ====
The draw for the third round took place on 23 July. Universitatea was drawn to play against the winners from the second qualifying round match between RB Leipzig and Häcken. Universitatea Craiova will play on 9 August and on 16 August 2018. On 2 August, RB Leipzig was confirmed as Craiova's opponent after their 5–1 aggregate win over Häcken.

9 August 2018 1st Leg	RB Leipzig (Germany)	3–1	(Romania) Universitatea Craiova	Leipzig, Germany
19:30 EEST (UTC+3)	Konaté 25'; Orban (yellow card) 30'; Matheus Cunha 77'; Poulsen 87'	Report	Kelić (yellow card) 86'; Martić 90+4'	Stadium: RB Arena; Attendance: 16,648; Referee: (Poland) Paweł Gil

16 August 2018 2nd Leg	Universitatea Craiova (Romania)	1–1 (2–4 agg.)	(Germany) RB Leipzig	Craiova, Romania
	Mitriță (yellow card) 23'; Baicu (yellow card) 31' (goal) 85'; Bancu (yellow card) 70'; Cicâldău (yellow card) 90+3'	Summary	Sabitzer (yellow card) 19' (goal) 39'; Demme (yellow card) 23'; Saracchi (yellow card) 74'; Kampl (yellow card) 84'; Augustin (yellow card) 90+1'	Stadium: Ion Oblemenco; Attendance: 12,050; Referee: (Czech Republic) Miroslav Zelinka

== Statistics ==
=== Appearances and goals ===
As of 1 July 2018

No.	Pos	Player	Liga I		Cupa României		Supercupa României		Europa League		Total	
No.	Pos	Player	Apps	Goals	Apps	Goals	Apps	Goals	Apps	Goals	Apps	Goals

=== Squad statistics ===
	Liga I	Cupa României	Supercupa României	Europa League	Home	Away	Total Stats
Games played	0	0	0	0	0	0	0
Games won	0	0	0	0	0	0	0
Games drawn	0	0	0	0	0	0	0
Games lost	0	0	0	0	0	0	0
Goals scored	0	0	0	0	0	0	0
Goals conceded	0	0	0	0	0	0	0
Goal difference	0	0	0	0	0	0	0
Clean sheets	0	0	0	0	0	0	0
Goal by Substitute	0	0	0	0	0	0	0
Total shots	–	–	–	–	–	–	–
Shots on target	–	–	–	–	–	–	–
Corners	–	–	–	–	–	–	–
Players used	–	–	–	–	–	–	–
Offsides	–	–	–	–	–	–	–
Fouls suffered	–	–	–	–	–	–	–
Fouls committed	–	–	–	–	–	–	–
Yellow cards	0	0	0	0	0	0	0
Red cards	0	0	0	0	0	0	0
Winning rate	0%	0%	0%	0%	0%	0%	0%

Last updated: 13 July 2018
Source: Competitive matches

=== Goalscorers ===
As of 13 July 2018

R	No.	Pos.	Nation	Name	Liga I	Cupa României	Supercupa României	Europa League	Total
Total					0	0	0	0	0

Last updated: 1 July 2018

=== Goal minutes ===
	1'–15'	16'–30'	31'–HT	46'–60'	61'–75'	76'–FT	Extra time	Forfeit
Goals	0	0	0	0	0	0	0	0
Percentage	0%	0%	0%	0%	0%	0%	0%	0%

Last updated: 2018 (UTC)
Source: UCV1948 (in Romanian)

=== Hat-tricks ===
Player	Against	Result	Date	Competition

=== Clean sheets ===
As of July 2018

Rank	Name	Liga I	Cupa României	Supercupa României	Europa League	Total	Played Games
Total		0	0	0	0	0	0

=== Disciplinary record ===
As of July 2018

Includes all competitive matches. Players listed below made at least one appearance for Universitatea Craiova first squad during the season.

N	P	Nat.	Name	Liga I			Cupa României			Supercupa României			Europa League			Total			Notes
N	P	Nat.	Name	Yellow card	Second yellow card	Red card	Yellow card	Second yellow card	Red card	Yellow card	Second yellow card	Red card	Yellow card	Second yellow card	Red card	Yellow card	Second yellow card	Red card	Notes

Last updated: 1 July 2018
Source: Competitive matches
Ordered by (red card) , (second yellow card) and (yellow card)
(yellow card) = Number of bookings; (second yellow card) = Number of sending offs after a second yellow card; (red card) = Number of sending offs by a direct red card.

=== Attendances ===
As of match played 1 July 2018

	Matches	Attendances	Average	High	Low
Liga I	0	0	0	0	0
Cupa României	0	0	0	0	0
Supercupa României	0	0	0	0	0
Europa League	0	0	0	0	0
Total	0	0	0	0	0

== See also ==
- 2018–19 Cupa României
- 2018–19 Liga I
- 2018–19 UEFA Europa League
