= Stadionul Orășenesc (Făurei) =

Football stadium in Făurei, Romania

- Interactive map of Stadionul Orășenesc
- Address: Str. Păcii 40
- Location: Făurei, Romania
- Coordinates: 45°05′21.1″N 27°16′20.5″E
- Owner: Commune of Făurei
- Operator: CS Făurei
- Capacity: 1,000 seated
- Surface: Grass

Tenant
- CS Făurei (2002–present)

Stadionul Orășenesc is a multi-purpose stadium in Făurei, Romania. It is currently used mostly for football matches, is the home ground of CS Făurei and holds 1,000 people.
