= Cristian Bărbuț =

Romanian footballer

Personal information
- Full name: Cristian Marian Bărbuț
- Date of birth: 22 April 1995 (age 31)
- Place of birth: Timișoara, Romania
- Height: 1.66 m (5 ft 5 in)
- Position: Winger

Team information
- Current team: CSM Reșița
- Number: 22

Youth career
- –2008: Srbianka Giuchici Timișoara
- 2008–2012: Politehnica Timișoara
- 2012: ACS Poli Timișoara

Senior career*
Years	Team	Apps	(Gls)
2013–2017	ACS Poli Timișoara	120	(13)
2017–2021	Universitatea Craiova	94	(9)
2021–2023	Sepsi OSK	41	(0)
2023–2024	Hermannstadt	17	(0)
2024	Politehnica Timișoara	2	(0)
2024–2026	Unirea Slobozia	52	(0)
2026–	CSM Reșița	12	(3)

International career
2013	Romania U18	2	(0)
2013–2014	Romania U19	7	(0)
2013–2014	Romania U21	1	(0)
- * Club domestic league appearances and goals as of 1 November 2026

Cristian Marian Bărbuț (born 22 April 1995) is a Romanian professional footballer who plays as a winger for Liga II club CSM Reșița.

== Club career ==
Bărbuț scored in his Liga I debut on 19 July 2013, playing for ACS Poli Timișoara in the 2–0 win against rivals Dinamo București.

== Career statistics ==
As of match played 1 November 2026

Appearances and goals by club, season and competition
Club	Season	League			Cupa României		Europe		Other		Total	
Club	Season	Division	Apps	Goals	Apps	Goals	Apps	Goals	Apps	Goals	Apps	Goals
ACS Poli Timișoara	2012–13	Liga II	9	1	0	0	—		—		9	1
ACS Poli Timișoara	2013–14	Liga I	27	3	2	1	—		—		29	4
ACS Poli Timișoara	2014–15	Liga II	20	6	0	0	—		—		20	6
ACS Poli Timișoara	2015–16	Liga I	30	1	2	0	—		2 (Note: Appearances in Cupa Ligii)	0	34	1
ACS Poli Timișoara	2016–17	Liga I	34	2	2	0	—		6	1	42	3
ACS Poli Timișoara	Total		120	13	6	1	0	0	8	1	134	15
Universitatea Craiova	2017–18	Liga I	14	2	2	0	2 (Note: Appearance(s) in UEFA Europa League)	0	—		18	2
Universitatea Craiova	2018–19	Liga I	32	3	4	1	0	0	0	0	36	4
Universitatea Craiova	2019–20	Liga I	27	2	2	0	6	0	—		35	2
Universitatea Craiova	2020–21	Liga I	21	2	1	0	1	0	—		23	2
Universitatea Craiova	Total		94	9	9	1	9	0	0	0	112	10
Sepsi OSK	2021–22	Liga I	27	0	6	1	0	0	—		33	1
Sepsi OSK	2022–23	Liga I	14	0	2	0	3 (Note: Appearances in UEFA Europa Conference League)	0	1 (Note: Appearance in Supercupa României)	0	20	0
Sepsi OSK	Total		41	0	8	1	3	0	1	0	53	1
Hermannstadt	2022–23	Liga I	11	0	1	0	—		—		12	0
Hermannstadt	2023–24	Liga I	6	0	3	1	—		—		9	1
Hermannstadt	Total		17	0	4	1	—		—		21	1
Politehnica Timișoara	2023–24	Liga III	2	0	—		—		2 (Note: Appearances in Liga III promotion play-offs)	0	4	0
Unirea Slobozia	2024–25	Liga I	17	0	1	0	—		2 (Note: Appearances in Liga I promotion/relegation play-offs)	0	20	0
Unirea Slobozia	2025–26	Liga I	35	0	0	0	—		—		35	0
Unirea Slobozia	Total		52	0	1	0	—		2	0	55	0
CSM Reșița	2026–27	Liga II	12	3	1	0	—		—		13	3
Career total			338	25	29	4	12	0	13	1	392	30

== Honours ==
ACS Poli Timișoara

- Liga II: 2014–15
- Cupa Ligii runner-up: 2016–17

Universitatea Craiova

- Cupa României: 2017–18, 2020–21
- Supercupa României runner-up: 2018

Sepsi OSK

- Cupa României: 2021–22
- Supercupa României: 2022
