= Vasile Constantin =

Romanian professional footballer

Personal information
- Full name: Vasile Nicolae Constantin
- Date of birth: 18 January 1998 (age 28)
- Place of birth: Segarcea, Romania
- Height: 1.74 m (5 ft 9 in)
- Position: Midfielder

Team information
- Current team: SCM Râmnicu Vâlcea

Youth career
- –2019: Universitatea Craiova

Senior career*
Years	Team	Apps	(Gls)
2019–2022	Universitatea Craiova	12	(2)
2021–2022	→ FC Brașov (loan)	20	(2)
2022–2023	FC Brașov	18	(0)
2023–2024	Tunari	20	(0)
2024	Alexandria	0	(0)
2025–2026	CS Dinamo București	6	(2)
2026–	SCM Râmnicu Vâlcea	0	(0)
- * Club domestic league appearances and goals as of 16:08, 8 December 2024 (UTC)

Vasile Nicolae Constantin (born 18 January 1998) is a Romanian professional footballer who plays as a midfielder for Liga II club SCM Râmnicu Vâlcea.

== Honours ==
Universitatea Craiova

- Cupa României: 2020–21
- Supercupa României: 2021
