= Alexandru Cicâldău =

Romanian footballer (born 1997)

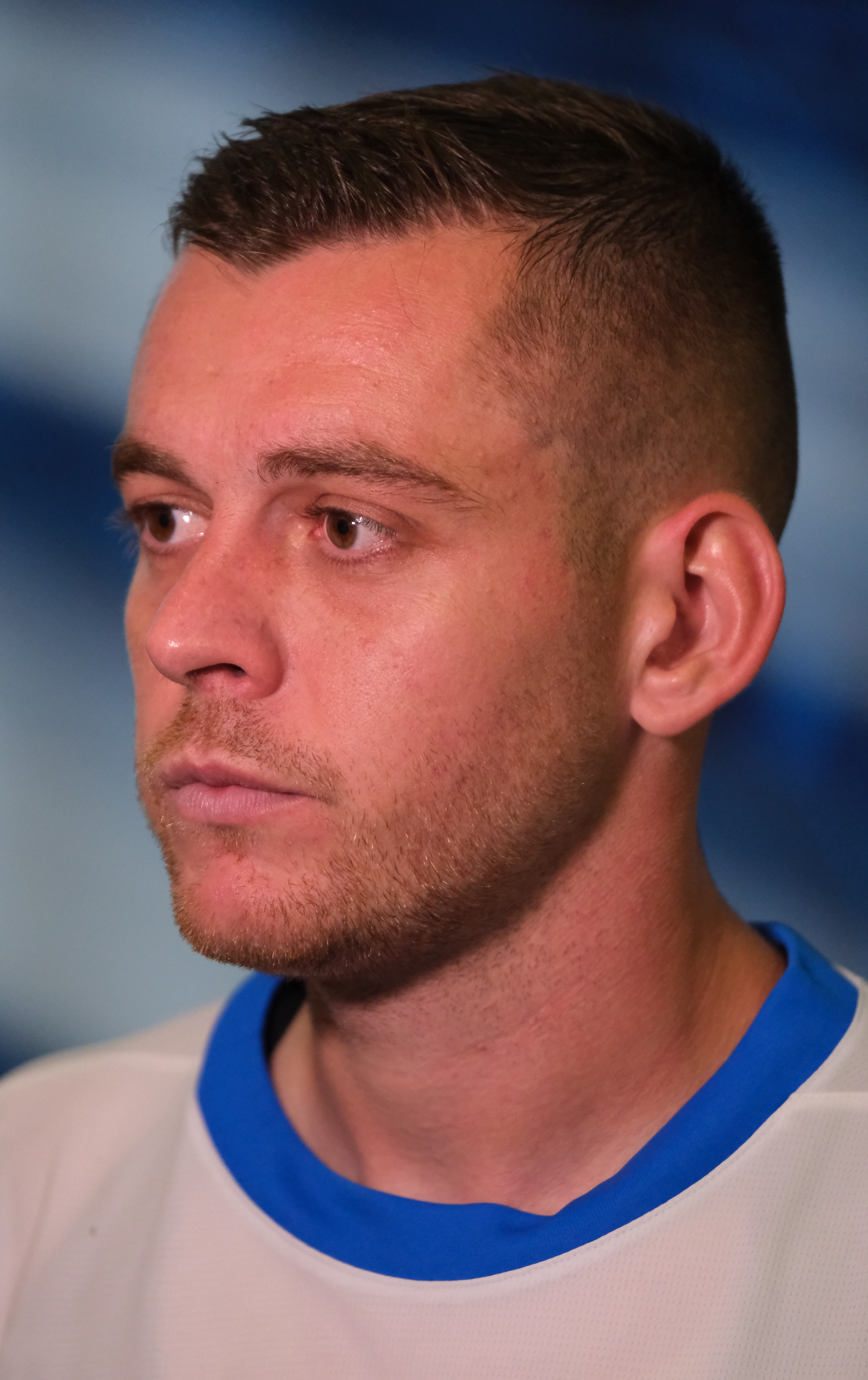
- Cicâldău with Universitatea Craiova in 2025

Personal information
- Date of birth: 8 July 1997 (age 29)
- Place of birth: Medgidia, Romania
- Height: 1.73 m (5 ft 8 in)
- Position: Midfielder

Team information
- Current team: Universitatea Craiova
- Number: 20

Youth career
- 2004–2009: Marcon Star Medgidia
- 2009–2015: Gheorghe Hagi Academy

Senior career*
Years	Team	Apps	(Gls)
2016–2018	Viitorul Constanța	42	(1)
2018–2021	Universitatea Craiova	106	(29)
2021–2024	Galatasaray	33	(4)
2022–2023	→ Ittihad Kalba (loan)	26	(4)
2023–2024	→ Konyaspor (loan)	31	(1)
2024–	Universitatea Craiova	60	(8)

International career^{‡}
2015	Romania U18	1	(0)
2015–2016	Romania U19	9	(1)
2017–2019	Romania U21	15	(2)
2018–	Romania	43	(6)
- * Club domestic league appearances and goals as of 8 November 2026 ‡ National team caps and goals as of 17 November 2026

Alexandru Cicâldău (Romanian pronunciation: [alekˈsandru tʃikɨlˈdəw]; born 8 July 1997) is a Romanian professional footballer who plays as a midfielder for Liga I club Universitatea Craiova and the Romania national team.

Cicâldău started his senior career at Viitorul Constanța, and in the summer of 2018 transferred to Universitatea Craiova. He totalled over 100 games in the league championship and won two domestic trophies with the latter, before moving abroad to Galatasaray for an initial €6.5 million in 2021. Following loans in the United Arab Emirates and Turkey, Cicâldau was bought back by Universitatea Craiova in 2024.

Internationally, Cicâldau registered his full debut for Romania in a 2–1 friendly defeat of Israel in March 2018. He represented the country in the UEFA Euro 2024.

== Club career ==
=== Early career and Viitorul Constanța ===
Cicâldău was raised in Satu Nou, a village near Medgidia, Constanța County, and started practising football at the age of eight. After initially playing at Marcon Star Medgidia, he joined the Gheorghe Hagi Academy, which served as the youth setup of Viitorul Constanța.

Cicâldău made his debut in the first division for Viitorul on 31 March 2016, aged 18, in a 1–1 away draw at ASA Târgu Mureș. He became a regular starter for the club in the 2017–18 season, amassing 38 appearances and one goal in all competitions.

=== Universitatea Craiova ===
On 6 July 2018, Cicâldău agreed to a four-year contract with Universitatea Craiova, being assigned the number 10 shirt. Press reported the fee at figures between €750,000 and €1 million plus interest. He made his first appearance for "the White-Blues" eight days later, playing the full match as CFR Cluj won 1–0 in the Supercupa României.

Cicâldău netted his first goal in a 3–0 league win over Astra Giurgiu, on 26 October. On 31 March 2019, he scored a header in a 3–2 away loss to title contenders FCSB. He recorded his first goal in European competitions on 18 July that year, opening a 3–2 home victory over Sabail in the second leg of the UEFA Europa League first qualifying round. After prolonged speculation regarding offers from foreign teams, in September he signed a contract extension which would have run until 2025.

On 31 January 2020, in the opening game of the calendar year, Cicâldau scored twice before half-time in a 3–1 defeat of Gaz Metan Mediaș; the second goal came from a free kick and the double was the first in his professional career. On 28 June, he scored the winner in a 3–2 away victory over two-time defending champions CFR Cluj, and two fixtures later converted a penalty in a 2–1 win against FCSB. Cicâldau ended the Liga I season with 14 goals, as Craiova lost the league title to CFR in the last home game.

During the 2020–21 season, Cicâldau amassed 12 goals from 42 appearances in all competitions, and won his first national cup after a 3–2 victory over Astra Giurgiu in the final. On 10 July 2021, he started in the 4–2 penalty shoot-out win over CFR Cluj in the subsequent Supercupa României.

=== Galatasaray ===
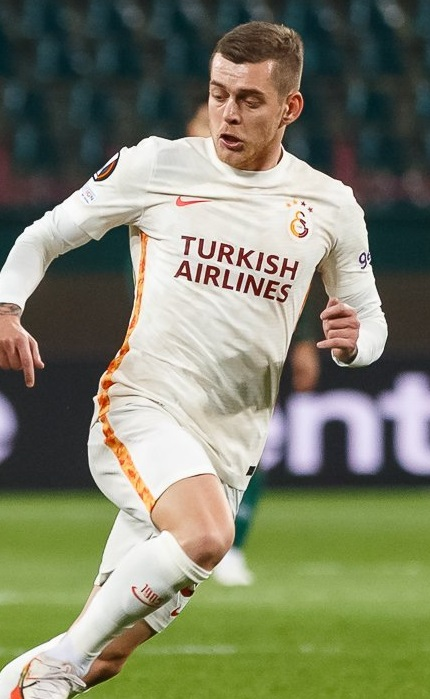
Cicâldău with Galatasaray in 2021

On 24 July 2021, Cicâldău joined Turkish club Galatasaray on a five-year deal in a transfer worth €6.5 million plus €2 million in bonuses. He made his debut on 16 August, in a 2–0 Süper Lig defeat of Giresunspor in which he converted a penalty. On 16 September, he played his first European match for the team in a 1–0 home victory over Lazio in the Europa League group stage.

On 25 October 2021, Cicâldău opened the scoring in a 2–1 derby loss to reigning champions Beşiktaş at Vodafone Park. One month later, he netted and provoked an own goal in the first half of a 4–2 Europa League defeat of Marseille. On 17 March 2022, he assisted Galatasaray's only goal in a 2–1 loss to Barcelona in the round of 16 of the same competition.

==== Loans ====
On 27 August 2022, Cicâldău was loaned out to the Emirati club Ittihad Kelba for one season. On 1 August 2023, he was loaned out again to fellow Süper Lig side Konyaspor.

=== Return to Universitatea Craiova ===
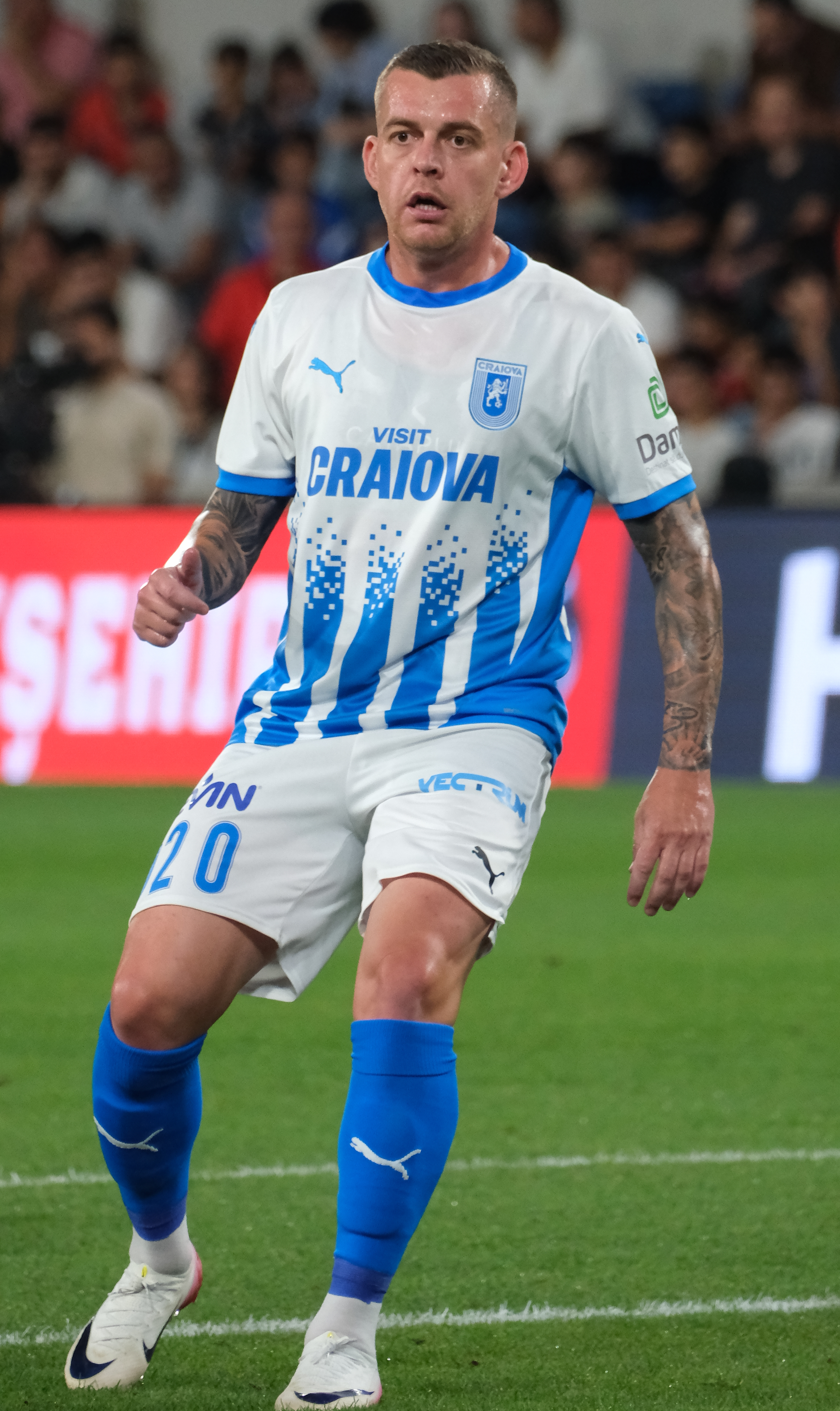
Cicâldău with Universitatea Craiova during the first leg of a Conference League play-off match against İstanbul Başakşehir, August 2025

Towards the end of the 2024 summer transfer window, after a €3.5 million move to Belgian Pro League club Westerlo fell through, it was reported that Galatasaray would loan Cicâldău back to his home country at Petrolul Ploiești. On 9 September, Universitatea Craiova hijacked the deal and re-signed him on a permanent basis for a rumoured fee of €1.5 million.

In late August 2025, Cicâldău helped Craiova qualify for the league phase of a European competition for the first time, scoring in both legs of a 5–2 aggregate win over İstanbul Başakşehir in the Conference League play-off round. On 18 December, he doubled the lead in the final league phase match against AEK Athens, but his team collapsed after his substitution to lose 3–2 and exit the tournament. He made 33 league appearances during the 2025–26 season, contributing three goals and four assists to help Craiova end a 35-year league title drought.

== International career ==
Cicâldău received his first call up for the Romania senior team in March 2018. On the 24th that month, he made his debut as an 83rd-minute substitute in a friendly with Israel, which his team won 2–1. His first official game for the country came on 17 November, in a 3–0 UEFA Nations League defeat of Lithuania.

The following year he represented the under-21 side at the 2019 UEFA European Championship, where they managed to progress past a group with Croatia, England and France, before being eliminated by defending champions Germany in the semi-finals. He earned four caps during the final tournament, all as a starter.

After the conclusion of the Under-21 Championship, Cicâldău continued to be selected for the senior team. On 31 March 2021, on his twelfth cap, he scored his first goals in a 2–3 away loss to Armenia counting for the 2022 FIFA World Cup qualifiers.

In 2023, Cicâldău appeared in seven games of the Euro 2024 qualifiers, including a start in the final 1–0 victory over Switzerland which secured Romania first place in Group I. On 7 June 2024, he was named in the squad for the final tournament. Cicâldău only played in the 0–3 loss to the Netherlands in the round of 16, coming on as a 72nd-minute substitute for Marius Marin.

== Style of play ==
Cicâldău is capable of aiding his teammates in both defense and attack, being described as a box-to-box midfielder by former Romanian international Gheorghe Craioveanu. He has been praised for his technique and work ethic.

== Career statistics ==
=== Club ===
As of match played 8 November 2026

Appearances and goals by club, season and competition
Club	Season	League			National cup (Note: Includes Cupa României, Turkish Cup, UAE President's Cup)		Continental		Other		Total	
Club	Season	Division	Apps	Goals	Apps	Goals	Apps	Goals	Apps	Goals	Apps	Goals
Viitorul Constanța	2015–16	Liga I	2	0	—		—		—		2	0
Viitorul Constanța	2016–17	Liga I	6	0	3	0	0	0	0	0	9	0
Viitorul Constanța	2017–18	Liga I	34	1	0	0	3 (Note: Two appearances in UEFA Champions League, one appearance in UEFA Europa League)	0	1 (Note: Appearances in Supercupa României)	0	38	1
Viitorul Constanța	Total		42	1	3	0	3	0	1	0	49	1
Universitatea Craiova	2018–19	Liga I	35	4	5	1	2 (Note: Appearance(s) in UEFA Europa League)	0	1	0	43	5
Universitatea Craiova	2019–20	Liga I	32	14	3	1	5	1	—		40	16
Universitatea Craiova	2020–21	Liga I	38	11	4	1	1	0	—		43	12
Universitatea Craiova	2021–22	Liga I	1	0	—		1 (Note: Appearance(s) in UEFA Conference League)	0	1	0	3	0
Universitatea Craiova	Total		106	29	12	3	9	1	2	0	129	33
Galatasaray	2021–22	Süper Lig	32	4	1	0	7	1	—		40	5
Galatasaray	2022–23	Süper Lig	1	0	—		—		—		1	0
Galatasaray	Total		33	4	1	0	7	1	0	0	41	5
Ittihad Kalba (loan)	2022–23	UAE Pro League	26	4	2	1	—		2 (Note: Appearances in UAE League Cup)	0	30	5
Konyaspor (loan)	2023–24	Süper Lig	31	1	1	0	—		—		32	1
Universitatea Craiova	2024–25	Liga I	13	3	2	0	—		—		15	3
Universitatea Craiova	2025–26	Liga I	33	3	6	1	12	4	—		51	8
Universitatea Craiova	2026–27	Liga I	14	2	1	0	11 (Note: Four appearances in UEFA Champions League, four appearances in UEFA Europa League, three appearances and one goal in UEFA Conference League)	1	1	0	27	3
Universitatea Craiova	Total		60	8	9	1	23	5	1	0	93	15
Career total			298	47	28	5	42	7	6	0	374	59

=== International ===
As of match played 17 November 2026

Appearances and goals by national team and year
National team	Year	Apps	Goals
Romania	2018	3	0
Romania	2019	3	0
Romania	2020	4	0
Romania	2021	10	2
Romania	2022	8	2
Romania	2023	7	0
Romania	2024	3	0
Romania	2025	0	0
Romania	2026	5	2
Total		43	6

Scores and results list Romania's goal tally first, score column indicates score after each Cicâldău goal.

List of international goals scored by Alexandru Cicâldău
No.	Date	Venue	Cap	Opponent	Score	Result	Competition
1	31 March 2021	Vazgen Sargsyan Republican Stadium, Yerevan, Armenia	12	Armenia	1–1	2–3	2022 FIFA World Cup qualification
2	31 March 2021	Vazgen Sargsyan Republican Stadium, Yerevan, Armenia	12	Armenia	2–1	2–3	2022 FIFA World Cup qualification
3	29 March 2022	Netanya Stadium, Netanya, Israel	22	Israel	1–0	2–2	Friendly
4	20 November 2022	Zimbru Stadium, Chișinău, Moldova	28	Moldova	3–0	5–0	Friendly
5	28 September 2026	Arena Națională, Bucharest, Romania	40	Bosnia and Herzegovina	2–4	2–4	2026–27 UEFA Nations League B
6	14 November 2026	Arena Națională, Bucharest, Romania	42	Poland	1–0	2–1	2026–27 UEFA Nations League B

== Honours ==
Viitorul Constanța

- Liga I: 2016–17
- Supercupa României runner-up: 2017

Universitatea Craiova

- Liga I: 2025–26
- Cupa României: 2020–21, 2025–26
- Supercupa României: 2021, 2026

Galatasaray

- Süper Lig: 2022–23

Individual

- Gazeta Sporturilor Romanian Footballer of the Year fourth place: 2021
- Gazeta Sporturilor Romania Player of the Month: November 2021
- Liga I Team of the Season: 2018–19, 2019–20, 2020–21
- Liga I Team of the Regular Season: 2018–19
- Liga I Team of the Championship Play-Offs: 2018–19
