= Kamer Qaka =

Albanian footballer (born 1995)

Personal information
- Date of birth: 11 April 1995 (age 31)
- Place of birth: Peja, FR Yugoslavia
- Height: 1.70 m (5 ft 7 in)
- Position: Defensive midfielder

Team information
- Current team: Partizani Tirana
- Number: 92

Youth career
- 2006–2010: Brandbu
- 2010–2011: Vålerenga

Senior career*
Years	Team	Apps	(Gls)
2010–2012	Vålerenga	10	(0)
2013	Raufoss	14	(0)
2014	Hønefoss	12	(0)
2015	Sarpsborg 08	12	(0)
2016–2017	Kristiansund	33	(0)
2017–2018	Politehnica Iași	28	(0)
2018	FCSB	5	(0)
2018–2019	Politehnica Iași	24	(0)
2019–2020	Universitatea Craiova	12	(0)
2020–2021	Kongsvinger	8	(0)
2021–2022	Shkëndija	18	(1)
2022–2023	Mezőkövesd	14	(0)
2023–2026	Shkëndija	75	(0)
2026–	Partizani Tirana	13	(0)

International career
2010	Norway U15	5	(0)
2011	Norway U16	9	(0)
2011–2012	Norway U17	9	(0)
2012–2013	Norway U18	8	(0)
2013–2014	Norway U19	5	(0)
2017–2018	Albania	4	(0)
- * Club domestic league appearances and goals as of 13 May 2026

Kamer Qaka (born 11 April 1995) is a professional footballer who plays as a defensive midfielder for Albanian club Partizani Tirana. Born in Yugoslavia, and a former Norwegian youth international, he played for the Albania national team.

== Club career ==
=== Early years / Norway ===
Qaka was born in Peja, modern-day Kosovo, but when he was two years old his family moved to Norway and settled in Brandbu. In 2010, while still attending lower secondary school, he signed his first professional contract for Norwegian Eliteserien side Vålerenga.

In a May 2010 cup game against Oppsal IF, as Qaka made his professional debut, he became Vålerenga's youngest goalscorer ever. He made his league debut in 2011.

In 2013, he signed for fellow Norwegian club Raufoss. He made his debut on 15 April 2013 against Odd 2 as they won the game 2–1. In January 2014, he joined Hønefoss BK, and a year later he went on to Sarpsborg 08 FF.

In 2016 he tried his luck with Kristiansund BK. His performances paid off when Qaka helped his team get promoted to the Eliteserien, as well as being awarded the trophy for the best player in the league.

=== Politehnica Iași ===
On 17 July 2017, after terminating his contract with Kristiansund, Qaka put pen to paper on a two-year deal with Romanian team Politehnica Iași. A week later, he made his competitive debut in a 0–0 Liga I draw with Gaz Metan Mediaș, coming on as a half-time substitute for Dan Spătaru. From the following matchday, Qaka established himself as a starter under head coach Flavius Stoican.

In November 2017, after his international debut for Albania, it was reported that fellow league teams FCSB, CFR Cluj and Universitatea Craiova, as well as Portuguese side Braga, were interested in acquiring the player.

=== Universitatea Craiova ===
On 3 June 2019, Qaka signed a four-year contract with Universitatea Craiova.

=== Return to Shkëndija ===
On 5 January 2023, Qaka returned to Shkëndija on a two-year contract.

== International career ==
From 2010 until 2014, Qaka represented Norway at youth international level, was part of the U15 and U19 teams respectively and played 36 matches for these teams. He accepted an invitation from the Albania national team by coach Christian Panucci for the friendly match against Turkey on 13 November 2017 as a replacement for the injured Amir Abrashi. He debuted for Albania against Turkey as a 67th-minute substitute for Odise Roshi in a 2–3 away win for his side.

== Career statistics ==
=== Club ===
As of 21 December 2020

Appearances and goals by club, season and competition
Club	Season	League			National cup (Note: Includes Norwegian Cup, Cupa României)		Europe		Other		Total	
Club	Season	Division	Apps	Goals	Apps	Goals	Apps	Goals	Apps	Goals	Apps	Goals
Vålerenga	2010	Eliteserien	0	0	1	1	—		—		1	1
Vålerenga	2011	Eliteserien	2	0	0	0	—		—		2	0
Vålerenga	2012	Eliteserien	8	0	1	0	—		—		9	0
Vålerenga	Total		10	0	2	1	—		—		12	1
Raufoss	2013	2. divisjon	14	0	2	0	—		—		16	0
Hønefoss	2014	OBOS-Ligaen	12	0	2	0	—		—		14	0
Sarpsborg 08	2015	Eliteserien	12	0	4	1	—		—		16	1
Kristiansund	2016	OBOS-Ligaen	24	0	1	0	—		—		25	0
Kristiansund	2017	Eliteserien	9	0	1	0	—		—		10	0
Kristiansund	Total		33	0	2	0	—		—		35	0
Politehnica Iași	2017–18	Liga I	28	0	2	0	—		—		30	0
FCSB	2018–19	Liga I	5	0	0	0	2 (Note: Appearances in UEFA Europa League)	0	—		7	0
Politehnica Iași	2018–19	Liga I	24	0	1	0	—		—		25	0
Universitatea Craiova	2019–20	Liga I	12	0	2	0	5	0	—		19	0
Kongsvinger	2020	OBOS-ligaen	8	0	0	0	—		—		8	0
Career total			158	0	17	2	7	0	—		182	2

=== International ===
Appearances and goals by national team and year
National team	Year	Apps	Goals
Albania
Albania	2017	1	0
Albania	2018	3	0
Total		4	0

== Honours ==
Shkëndija

- Macedonian First Football League: 2024–25

Sarpsborg 08

- Norwegian Football Cup runner-up: 2015

Kristiansund

- OBOS-ligaen: 2016
