= Antoni Ivanov =

Bulgarian footballer

Personal information
- Full name: Antoni Valeri Ivanov
- Date of birth: 11 September 1995 (age 31)
- Place of birth: Sofia, Bulgaria
- Height: 1.70 m (5 ft 7 in)
- Positions: Midfielder; full-back

Team information
- Current team: UTA Arad
- Number: 6

Youth career
- –2012: CSKA Sofia
- 2012–2013: Ludogorets Razgrad

Senior career*
Years	Team	Apps	(Gls)
2013–2014	Ludogorets Razgrad	0	(0)
2013–2014	→ Akademik Svishtov (loan)	18	(1)
2014–2016	Spartak Pleven	31	(3)
2016	Sozopol	8	(0)
2017	Montana	11	(0)
2017–2018	Septemvri Sofia	17	(2)
2018–2019	Gaz Metan Mediaș	30	(1)
2019–2022	Universitatea Craiova	34	(1)
2021	→ Voluntari (loan)	17	(3)
2022	→ Dinamo București (loan)	12	(1)
2022–2023	Botoșani	34	(0)
2023–2024	Lokomotiv Sofia	21	(2)
2024–2026	Hermannstadt	62	(1)
2026–	UTA Arad	6	(0)
- * Club domestic league appearances and goals as of 1 November 2026

Antoni Valeri Ivanov (Bulgarian: Антони Валери Иванов; born 11 September 1995) is a Bulgarian professional footballer who plays as a midfielder or a full-back for Liga I club UTA Arad.

== Career ==
Ivanov started his professional career at Akademik Svishtov on loan from Ludogorets Razgrad. In July 2014, he signed with Spartak Pleven where he won the 2014–15 North-West V AFG title. In June 2016, Ivanov joined Sozopol but failed to establish himself in the starting XI and was released six months later. In January 2017, after a successful trial period, Ivanov signed with Montana and made his First League debut on 12 February 2017 against Ludogorets Razgrad, coming on as substitute for Andreas Vasev.

In July 2017 he joined Septemvri Sofia. He made his debut for the team on 17 July 2017 in match against Dunav Ruse.

== Career statistics ==
=== Club ===
As of match played 1 November 2026

Appearances and goals by club, season and competition
Club	Season	League			National cup (Note: Includes Bulgarian Cup, Cupa României)		Europe		Other		Total	
Club	Season	Division	Apps	Goals	Apps	Goals	Apps	Goals	Apps	Goals	Apps	Goals
Akademik Svishtov (loan)	2013–14	B PFG	18	1	1	0	—		—		19	1
Spartak Pleven	2014–15	V AFG	19	2	0	0	—		—		19	2
Spartak Pleven	2015–16	B PFG	12	1	2	0	—		—		14	1
Spartak Pleven	Total		31	3	2	0	—		—		33	3
Sozopol	2015–16	Bulgarian Second League	8	0	0	0	—		—		8	0
Montana	2016–17	Bulgarian First League	11	0	—		—		5 (Note: Appearances in Bulgarian First League relegation play-offs)	0	16	0
Septemvri Sofia	2017–18	Bulgarian First League	17	2	2	0	—		0	0	19	2
Septemvri Sofia	2018–19	Bulgarian First League	0	0	—		—		—		1	0
Septemvri Sofia	Total		17	2	2	0	—		0	0	19	2
Gaz Metan Mediaș	2018–19	Liga I	30	1	2	0	—		—		32	1
Universitatea Craiova	2019–20	Liga I	26	1	0	0	6 (Note: Appearances in UEFA Europa League)	1	—		32	2
Universitatea Craiova	2020–21	Liga I	0	0	0	0	0	0	—		0	0
Universitatea Craiova	2021–22	Liga I	8	0	1	0	0	0	0	0	9	0
Universitatea Craiova	Total		34	1	1	0	6	1	0	0	41	2
Voluntari (loan)	2020–21	Liga I	17	3	—		—		0	0	17	3
Dinamo București (loan)	2021–22	Liga I	12	1	—		—		0	0	12	1
Botoșani	2022–23	Liga I	33	0	2	0	—		—		35	0
Botoșani	2023–24	Liga I	1	0	0	0	—		—		1	0
Botoșani	Total		34	0	2	0	—		—		36	0
Lokomotiv Sofia	2023–24	Bulgarian First League	21	2	2	0	—		—		23	2
Hermannstadt	2024–25	Liga I	35	0	7	0	—		—		42	0
Hermannstadt	2025–26	Liga I	27	1	3	0	—		—		30	1
Hermannstadt	Total		62	1	10	0	—		—		72	1
UTA Arad	2026–27	Liga I	6	0	2	0	—		—		8	0
Career total			301	15	24	0	6	1	5	0	336	16

== Honours ==
Spartak Pleven

- V AFG: 2014–15

Universitatea Craiova

- Supercupa României: 2021

Hermannstadt

- Cupa României runner-up: 2024–25
