= Făurei =

- Town
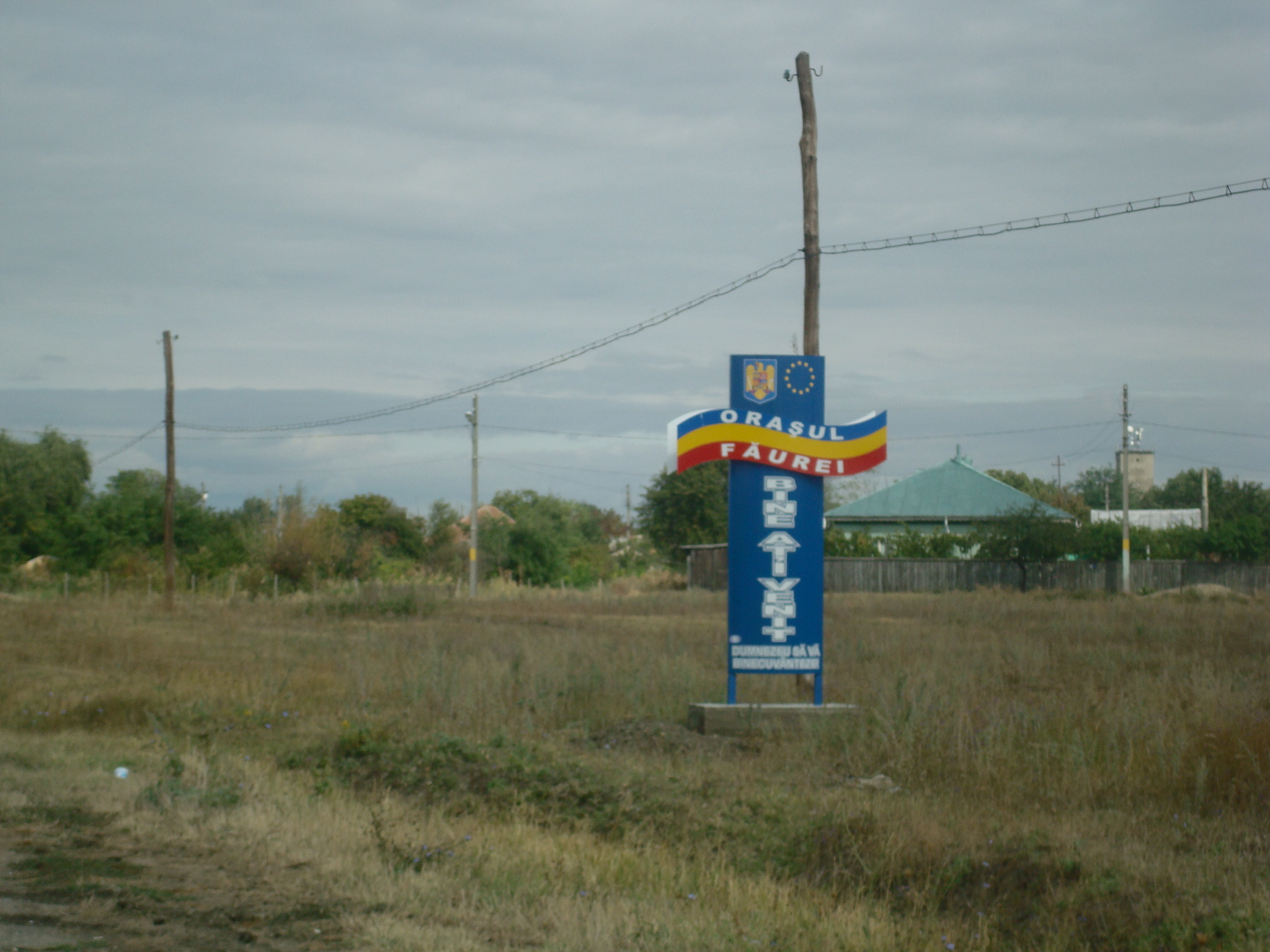
- Entrance in Făurei

- Coat of arms

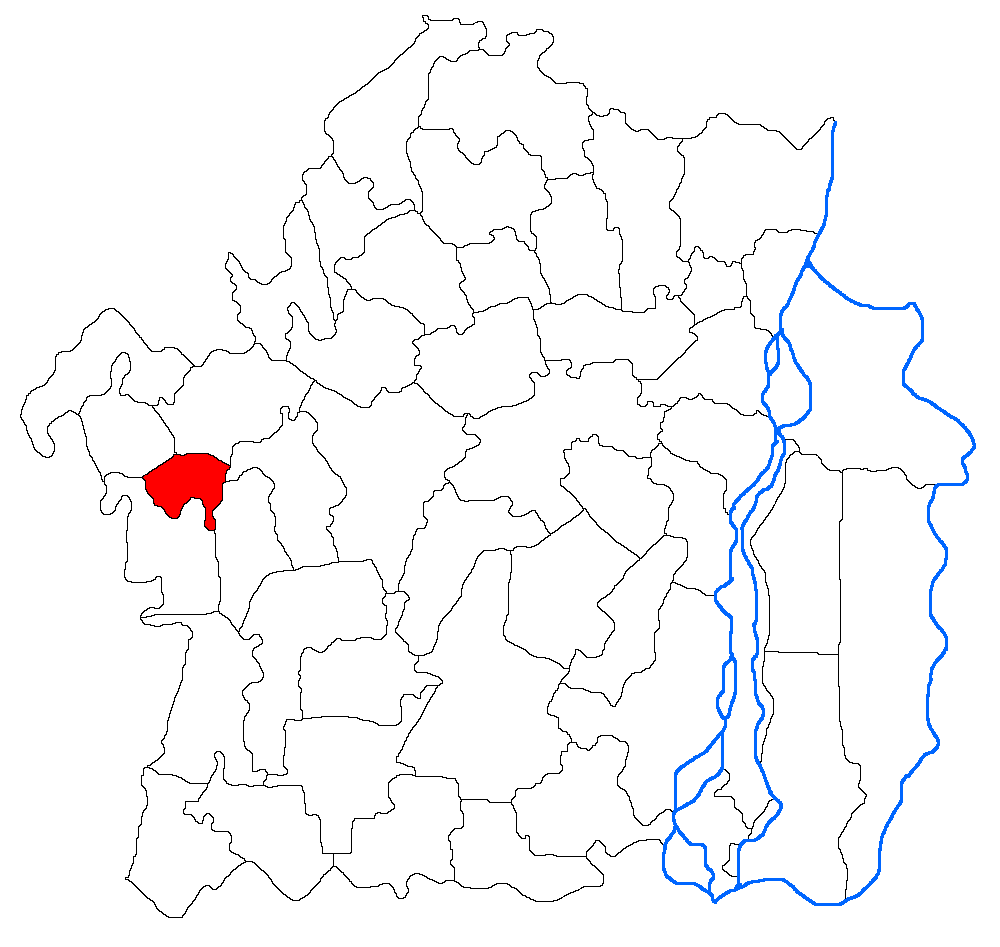
- Location in Brăila County

- Location in Romania
- Coordinates: 45.0842°N 27.2728°E
- Country: Romania
- County: Brăila

Government
  - Mayor (2024–2028): Grigore-Gabriel Mocanu (PNL)
- Area: 18.28 km^{2} (7.06 sq mi)
- Elevation: 42 m (138 ft)
- Population (2021-12-01): 3,008
  - Density: 164.6/km^{2} (426.2/sq mi)
- Time zone: UTC+02:00 (EET)
  - Summer (DST): UTC+03:00 (EEST)
- Postal code: 815100
- Area code: (+40) 02 39
- Vehicle reg.: BR
- Website: orasulfaurei.ro

Făurei is a town located in Brăila County, Romania.

Since 1978, it has been the site of a railway testing center.

== People ==
Historical population
Year	Pop.	±%
1977	3,574	—
1992	4,356	+21.9%
2002	4,626	+6.2%
2011	3,411	−26.3%
2021	3,008	−11.8%
Source: Census data

- George Dragomir (b. 2003), football player
- Bănel Nicoliță (b. 1985), football player
