= Luis Nițu =

Romanian footballer

Personal information
- Full name: Luis Emanuel Nițu
- Date of birth: 30 May 2001 (age 25)
- Place of birth: Slatina, Romania
- Height: 1.83 m (6 ft 0 in)
- Position: Winger

Team information
- Current team: Chindia Târgoviște
- Number: 30

Youth career
- –2016: CSȘ Slatina
- 2017–2019: Universitatea Craiova

Senior career*
Years	Team	Apps	(Gls)
2019–2020	Universitatea Craiova	11	(3)
2020–2022	Gaz Metan Mediaș	14	(1)
2022–2023	CSM Slatina	14	(3)
2023–2024	Cetatea Turnu Măgurele	20	(5)
2024–2025	Dunărea Călărași	15	(2)
2025–	Chindia Târgoviște	7	(1)

International career
2018	Romania U17	4	(1)
2018	Romania U18	3	(1)
2018–2019	Romania U19	5	(0)
- * Club domestic league appearances and goals as of 10 May 2025

Luis Emanuel Nițu (born 30 May 2001) is a Romanian professional footballer who plays as a winger for Liga II club Chindia Târgoviște.
