= Coman =

Coman is a surname.

As an Irish surname, it is anglicised from Irish Gaelic surname Ó Comáin.

As a Romanian surname, it originated from the nickname literally meaning "Cuman".

Notable people with the surname include:

- Anghei Coman, Romanian sprint canoeist who competed from the early 1980s
- Carolyn Coman, writer of children's books, living in South Hampton, New Hampshire
- Dănuț Coman (born 1979), Romanian goalkeeper
- Dragoș Coman (born 1980), international freestyle swimmer from Romania
- Florinel Coman (born 1998), Romanian professional footballer
- Gabriela Coman (born 1959), Romanian volleyball player
- Gigel Coman (born 1978), Romanian football player
- Gilly Coman (1960–2010), British-based actress
- Herbert Coman (1920–2009), American football player and coach
- Ioan Coman (born 1908–date of death unknown), Romanian cross-country skier
- Ion Coman (born 1981), Romanian football player who currently plays as a striker
- Ion Coman (general) (born 1926), Romanian general
- Isabel Coman, British civil engineer
- Jamie Coman (born 1962), Australian equestrian
- Katharine Coman (1857–1915), social activist and economist
- Kingsley Coman (born 1996), French footballer
- Marius Coman (born 1996), Romanian professional footballer
- Martha Coman (1872–1959), American journalist
- Mike Coman (born 1987), New Zealand professional rugby player
- Otilia Valeria Coman (born 1942), birth name of the Romanian poet and civil rights activist Ana Blandiana
- Peter Coman (born 1943), former cricketer who played three One Day Internationals
- Robert Grimes Coman, Commodore in the United States Navy
- Simion Coman (1890–1971), Romanian Brigadier-General during World War II
- Thomas Coman, President of the New York City Board of Aldermen from 1868 to 1871
- Teodor Coman (born 1962), former Romanian rugby union football player
- Tiberiu Coman (born 2002), Romanian professional footballer

== See also ==
- Comana (disambiguation)
- Comănescu (surname)
