= Comegys =

Comegys is a surname of Dutch origin. It was adopted in the United States by immigrants from the Netherlands, and is a portmanteau of the surnames Coman and Ghysen. Notable people with the surname include:

- Celeste Comegys Peardon (1898–1988), American writer, educator
- Cornelius P. Comegys (1780–1851), American farmer and politician
- Dallas Comegys (born 1964), American basketball player
- Joseph P. Comegys (1813–1893), American judge, lawyer and politician
- Zelina Brunschwig (died 1981), American textile importer, born Zelina Comegys

== See also ==
- Rick Comegy (born 1953), American football player and coach
