= Peardon =

Peardon is a surname. It may refer to

- Celeste Comegys Peardon (1898–1988), American writer
- Derek Peardon (born 1950), former Australian rules football player
- Patricia Peardon (1923/1924)–1993, American actress and sculptor

Historic Events for the Peardon family + RMS Lusitania Mr. Franklin Arthur Peardon, Canadian 1st Class Passenger from Toronto, Ontario, Canada, who sailed aboard the RMS Lusitania (1915) and died in the sinking [2]

Surname originates from England (U.K.) specifically in Cornwall

Peardon Settlers in Australia in the 19th Century Mr. William Peardon, (b. 1798), aged 29 born in Launceston, Cornwall, UK convicted in Devon on 15th October 1827, sentenced for 14 years for stealing from a master, transported aboard the ship "York" in 1829 to Van Diemen's Land, Tasmania, Australia [1] William Peardon, aged 18, a miner, who arrived in South Australia in 1857 aboard the ship "Gilmore"

Peardon Settlers in New Zealand in the 19th Century William Peardon, aged 37, who arrived in Auckland, New Zealand aboard the ship "Westminster" in 1843 Ann Peardon, aged 21, who arrived in Auckland, New Zealand aboard the ship "Westminster" in 1843
