= Comănești (disambiguation) =

Comănești is a town in Bacău County, Romania.

Comăneşti may also refer to several places in Romania:

- Comănești, Suceava, a commune in Suceava County
- Comăneşti, a village in Hășmaș Commune, Arad County
- Comăneşti, a village in Cavadinești Commune, Galaţi County
- Comăneşti, a village in Mărtiniș Commune, Harghita County
- Comăneşti, a village in Bala Commune, Mehedinţi County
- Comăneşti, a village in Bobicești Commune, Olt County

== See also ==
- Coman (disambiguation)
- Comana (disambiguation)
- Comanca (disambiguation)
