= Comanca =

Comanca may refer to several villages in Romania:

- Comanca, a village in Deveselu Commune, Olt County
- Comanca, a village in the town of Băile Olăneşti, Vâlcea County
- Comanca, a tributary of the river Olănești in Vâlcea County

== See also ==
- Coman (disambiguation)
- Comana (disambiguation)
- Comănești (disambiguation)
