= Florinel Coman =

Romanian footballer (born 1998)

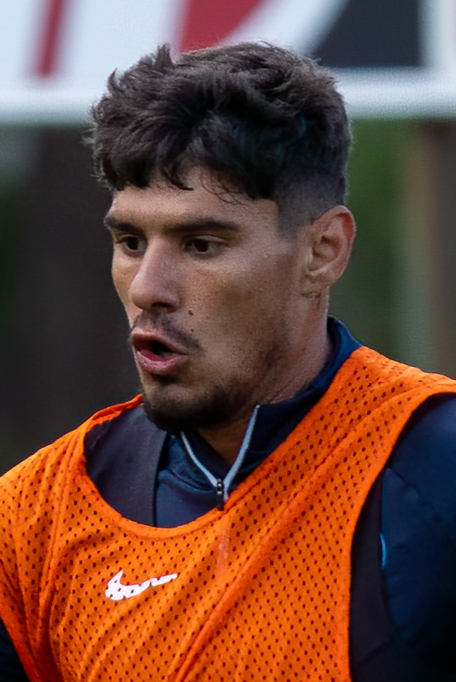
- Coman training for FCSB in 2023

Personal information
- Full name: Florinel Teodor Coman
- Date of birth: 10 April 1998 (age 28)
- Place of birth: Brăila, Romania
- Height: 1.82 m (6 ft 0 in)
- Position: Winger

Team information
- Current team: Al-Gharafa
- Number: 7

Youth career
- 2006–2011: Luceafărul Brăila
- 2011–2015: Gheorghe Hagi Academy

Senior career*
Years	Team	Apps	(Gls)
2015–2017	Viitorul Constanța	44	(6)
2017–2024	FCSB	190	(53)
2024–	Al-Gharafa	34	(5)
2025	→ Cagliari (loan)	9	(1)

International career^{‡}
2014–2015	Romania U17	6	(4)
2016	Romania U19	3	(2)
2017–2019	Romania U21	19	(4)
2019–	Romania	24	(3)
- * Club domestic league appearances and goals as of 8 November 2026 ‡ National team caps and goals as of 17 November 2026

Florinel Teodor Coman (Romanian pronunciation: [floriˈnel teˈodor ˈkoman]; born 10 April 1998) is a Romanian professional footballer who plays as a winger for Qatar Stars League club Al-Gharafa and the Romania national team.

Coman began his career at Viitorul Constanța in 2015, winning a national championship in his second full season with the club. In 2017, he transferred to FCSB in a deal eventually worth €3 million, representing the highest fee paid by a Liga I side. With FCSB, Coman won the Cupa României in 2019 and secured another national title in the 2023–24 campaign, during which he was the league's top scorer and named Player of the Season. Shortly after, he earned a €5.25 million transfer to Qatari team Al-Gharafa.

Coman made his senior debut for Romania in October 2019, after previously being capped at under-17, under-19, and under-21 levels. He competed for the country in the UEFA Euro 2024, where the team won their group and reached the round of 16.

== Early life ==
Coman was born in the city of Brăila and grew up as a Dinamo București supporter. His first coach, Nicușor Baldovin, stated that after Dinamo won the 2006–07 league championship, Coman was trying to emulate Claudiu Niculescu's free kicks.

== Club career ==
=== Viitorul Constanța ===
Coman was selected from Viitorul Constanța's academy by first-team manager and owner Gheorghe Hagi, and made his professional debut by coming on as a substitute in a 2–0 Liga I win against Astra Giurgiu on 18 March 2015. On 14 August 2016, aged 18, he scored his first goal in a 3–1 league victory over ASA Târgu Mureș.

Coman was named the Liga I Player of the Month for February 2017 after scoring in wins against Dinamo București (2–1), Pandurii Târgu Jiu (3–0) and ACS Poli Timișoara (5–0), respectively. He was once again on the scoresheet on 18 March, opening a 3–1 home victory against FCSB. In the final fixture against CFR Cluj on 13 May, Coman won the penalty from which Gabriel Iancu netted the only goal of the match, thus being decisive in Viitorul's first national title conquest.

On 26 July 2017, Coman registered his debut in European competitions by coming on as a 66th-minute substitute in a 1–0 home win over APOEL in the third qualifying round of the UEFA Champions League.

=== FCSB ===
==== 2017–2020: Adjustment to Bucharest and development ====
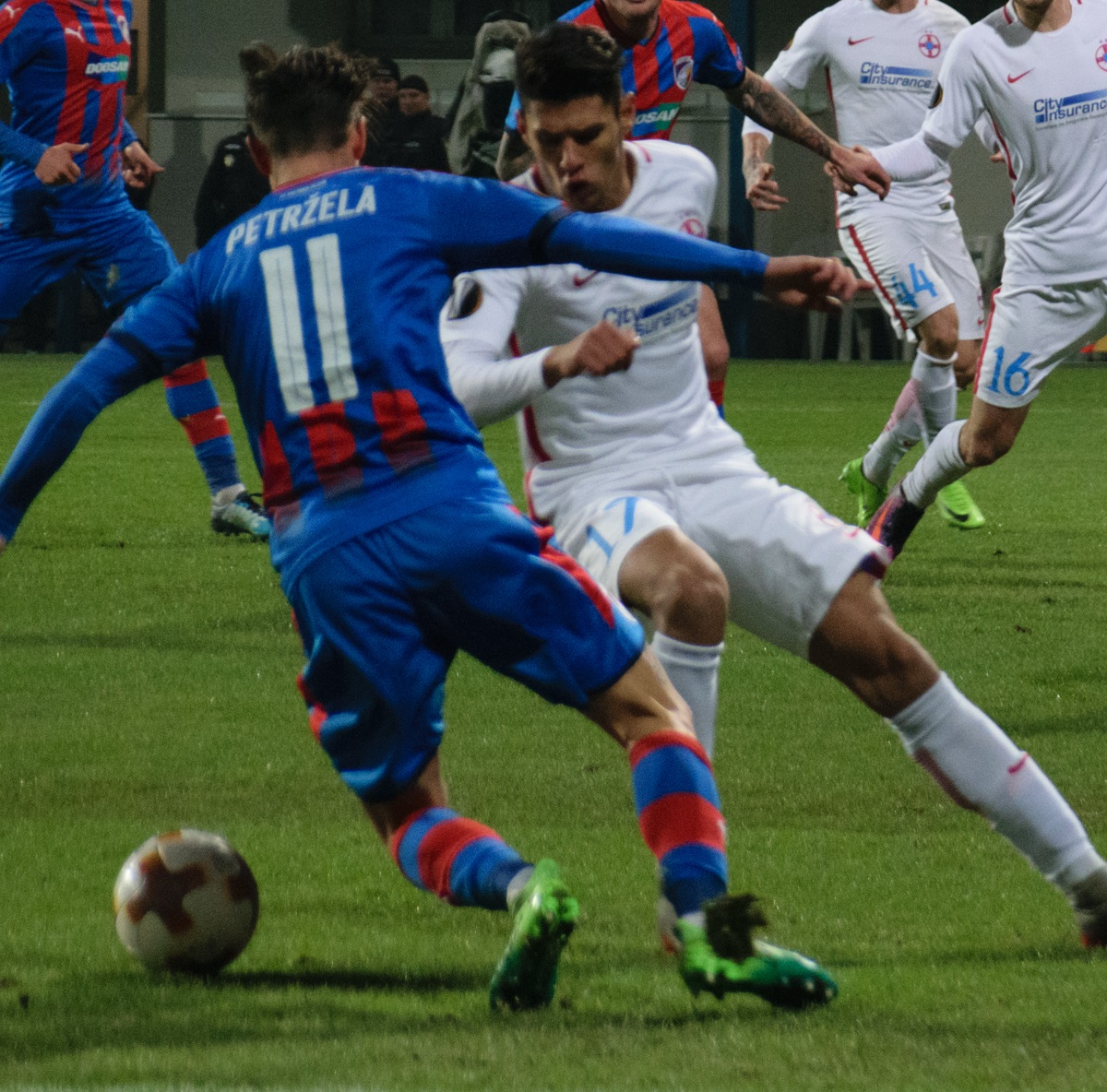
Coman (foreground, in white) playing against Viktoria Plzeň in the UEFA Europa League, November 2017.

After Portuguese side Benfica showed interest in acquiring Coman, on 21 August 2017 he moved to fellow league team FCSB for a reported €2 million and 20% interest, plus €500,000 in add-ons. His release clause was set at a Romanian record €100 million. In November that year, Viitorul's remaining economic rights were redeemed for €1 million, with the total €3 million fee making Coman the most expensive signing of the Liga I, tied with Cristian Fabbiani's move from Lanús to CFR Cluj in 2007.

Coman scored his first two goals for the Roș-albaștrii on 22 October 2017, in a 7–0 thrashing of ACS Poli Timișoara. On 2 November, he recorded his first European goal in a 1–1 draw with Hapoel Be'er Sheva in the Europa League group stage. Also in the latter competition, Coman entered the pitch after half-time in a 1–5 round of 32 loss to Lazio at the Stadio Olimpico and contributed to Harlem Gnohéré's goal, on 22 February 2018.

On 29 July 2018, in the second match of the 2018–19 Liga I, Coman scored a double in a 3–3 derby draw to Dinamo București. After an inconsistent start at FCSB, he cemented his place in the starting eleven in his second season in Bucharest, with twelve goals from 38 appearances in all competitions.

On 14 July 2019, in the opening fixture of the campaign, Coman scored and provided an assist in a 4–3 victory over Hermannstadt. He then went on to net one each in the tie against Alashkert in the Europa League second qualifying round, which his team won 5–3 on aggregate. FCSB failed to qualify for the group stage for a second year in a row after losing to Vitória Guimarães in the play-off round; Coman however rose to prominence individually, as he became the top scorer of the domestic league by the turn of the year with ten goals. His good form earned him the fifth place in Gazeta Sporturilor's 2019 Romanian Footballer of the Year award, tied with Ianis Hagi.

==== 2020–2022: Struggles with injuries ====
Coman spent roughly half of 2020 without playing, initially due to the setbacks caused by the COVID-19 pandemic and then after being injured in a match against TSC Bačka Topola in the Europa League qualifiers in September. He returned from the sidelines on 6 December 2020, coming on as a substitute and scoring a goal in a 3–0 win over UTA Arad; he broke down in tears and dedicated the goal to his late grandfather. He however picked up another injury in March 2021, and one more in August that year which required surgical intervention.

==== 2022–2024: Return to form ====
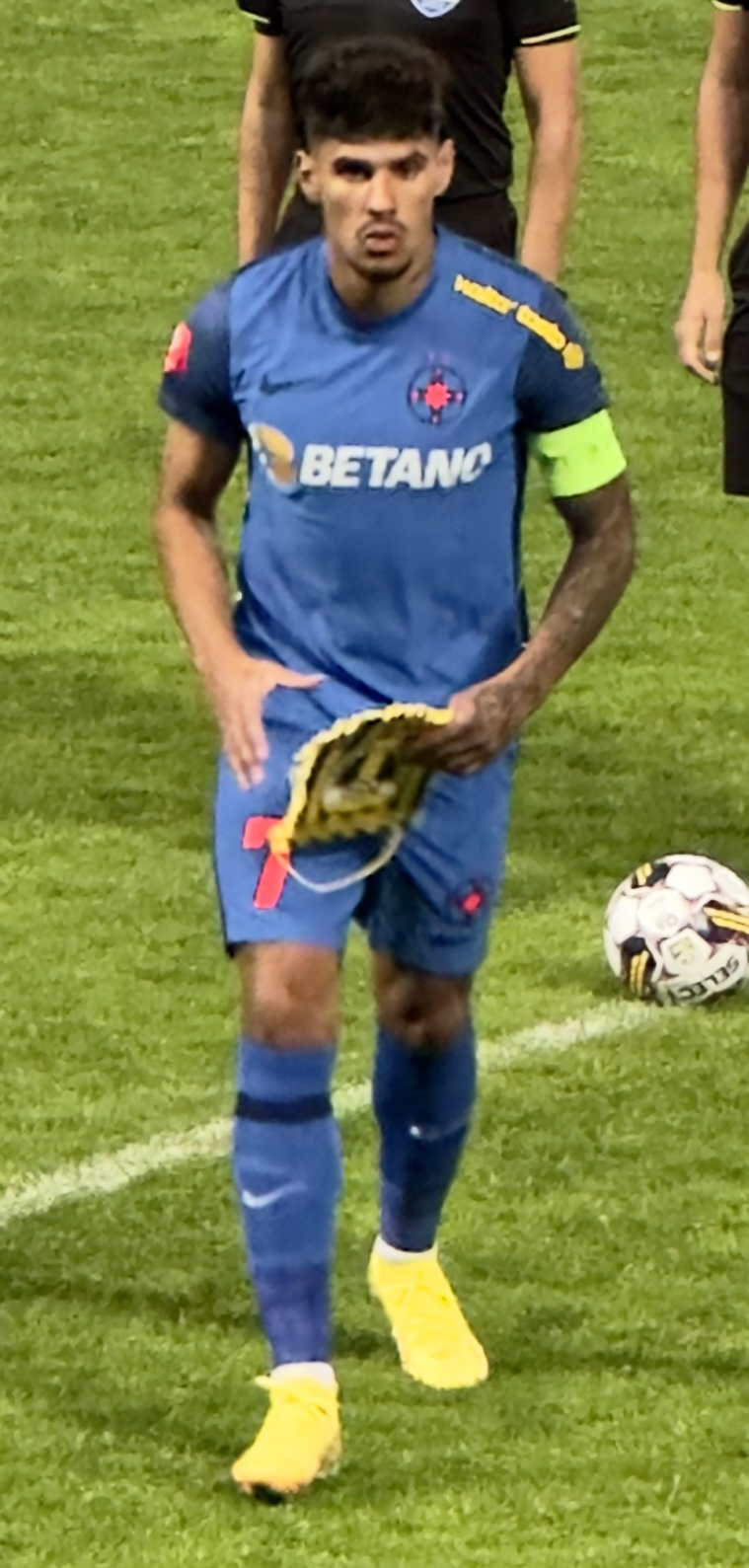
Coman in a league match against Petrolul Ploiești in October 2022

On 28 July 2022, Coman netted for the first time in almost a year in a 4–2 home defeat of Saburtalo Tbilisi counting for the Europa Conference League qualifiers. In the same match, he was also handed the captain armband as a result of Florin Tănase's imminent departure. On 9 October, he doubled the lead in a 2–0 away victory over newly-promoted Petrolul Ploiești, representing his first Liga I goal in 22 months.

In April 2023, Coman scored in three successive league matches—namely against Sepsi OSK (2–1 win), CFR Cluj (1–1 draw) and Farul Constanța (2–1 win)—and was named the Romania Player of the Month by the Gazeta Sporturilor daily. His performances saw him earn a contract extension lasting until 2027, with his release clause dropping to €5 million in order to facilitate a transfer abroad. On 14 May, he scored again against CFR Cluj in a 1–0 home success. One week later, Coman assisted FCSB's second goal in a 2–3 away loss to eventual champions Farul Constanța.

On 16 July 2023, Coman converted a penalty in a 3–1 win against FC U Craiova in the campaign's opener. The next fixture, he netted to help to a 2–1 derby defeat of Dinamo București. On the 26th, he scored the only goal of a Europa Conference League second qualifying round victory against CSKA 1948. Due to his exploits, Coman was named the Gazeta Sporturilor Romania Player of the Month for July 2023. On 26 November, Coman scored again in a derby against Dinamo București, his converted free kick representing the only goal of the game. On 21 December that year, the Gazeta Sporturilor newspaper announced that he came fifth in voting for the 2023 Romanian Footballer of the Year award, repeating his performance from 2019.

In April 2024, Coman converted free kicks in consecutive wins against title contenders Universitatea Craiova (2–0) and CFR Cluj (1–0), and earned his third Gazeta Sporturilor Player of the Month award. Later that month, FCSB secured its first league title in nine years, and Coman went on to finish the season as top scorer with 18 goals, shared with CFR Cluj's Philip Otele.

=== Al-Gharafa ===
On 3 July 2024, FCSB owner Gigi Becali announced that he accepted a €5.25 million transfer offer for Coman from Al-Gharafa. He travelled to Doha to undergo a medical on 7 July, and one day later signed a three-year contract with the option of another year for the Qatar Stars League club.

Coman made his competitive debut on 9 August 2024, starting in a goalless away draw with Al-Khor in the league championship. Two weeks later, he scored his first goals in a 2–1 home win over Al-Rayyan.

==== Loan to Cagliari ====
On 3 February 2025, Coman was loaned out to Serie A club Cagliari until the end of the season for an undisclosed fee, reported to be €1.5 million and including partial wage coverage. On 9 February, he scored in less than two minutes after coming on as a substitute in a 2–1 league win over Parma.

==== Return from loan ====
Following his loan spell at Cagliari, Coman returned to Al-Gharafa for the 2025–26 season, during which he scored once in 15 league appearances and made eight goalless appearances in the AFC Champions League.

In May 2026, he trained with his former club FCSB to maintain fitness ahead of international fixtures, leading to media speculation regarding a return to Romania, though he remained with Al-Gharafa for the 2026–27 campaign.

== International career ==
=== Youth ===
Coman featured for the Romania national under-21 team in the 2019 UEFA European Championship, mostly as a second-half substitute. In the group fixture on 21 June, he entered in the 63rd minute for Andrei Ivan, obtained a penalty, and scored a double to help to a 4–2 victory against England. He then earned his first and only start in a goalless draw with France, with both teams progressing to the semi-finals, where Romania suffered a 2–4 defeat to Germany.

=== Senior ===
Coman made his full debut for Romania on 12 October 2019, starting in a Euro 2020 qualifier against the Faroe Islands. He was replaced after 69 minutes by Alexandru Mitriță in the eventual 3–0 away victory of his nation.

On 15 October 2023, Coman scored his first senior international goal in a 4–0 Euro 2024 qualifier win against Andorra. He amassed seven appearances in the competition, including a start in the final 1–0 victory over Switzerland, which secured Romania first place in Group I.

On 7 June 2024, Coman was selected in the squad for Euro 2024. He started in the opening group match against Ukraine, contributing to a 3–0 win that marked his nation's first European Championship victory in 24 years. He was an unused substitute in the 0–2 loss to Belgium, then started again in the 1–1 draw with Slovakia, as Romania topped its group. Coman missed the 0–3 loss to the Netherlands in the round of 16 due to a muscular injury.

== Style of play ==
Coman is typically deployed as a left winger and has been praised for his pace and technical ability.

== Personal life ==
=== Family and relationships ===
Coman married his girlfriend Ioana Timofeciuc in June 2022. The following month, she gave birth to a girl whom they named Kasia.

=== Legal issues ===
On 22 February 2021, Coman was pulled over by the Romanian Police for exceeding the speed limit while driving on the A2 motorway. Upon inspection, they discovered that he had a fake Ukrainian license. On 22 April 2024, after admitting that he purchased the fake permit online for €1,500, Coman was handed an 11-month suspended sentence and ordered to perform community service.

== Career statistics ==
=== Club ===
As of match played 8 November 2026

Appearances and goals by club, season and competition
Club	Season	League			National cup (Note: Includes Cupa României, Qatar Cup)		Continental		Other		Total	
Club	Season	Division	Apps	Goals	Apps	Goals	Apps	Goals	Apps	Goals	Apps	Goals
Viitorul Constanța	2014–15	Liga I	1	0	0	0	—		—		1	0
Viitorul Constanța	2015–16	Liga I	10	0	1	0	—		—		11	0
Viitorul Constanța	2016–17	Liga I	28	6	0	0	—		—		28	6
Viitorul Constanța	2017–18	Liga I	5	0	0	0	2 (Note: Two appearances in UEFA Champions League)	0	0	0	7	0
Viitorul Constanța	Total		44	6	1	0	2	0	0	0	47	6
FCSB	2017–18	Liga I	20	3	2	0	8 (Note: Appearances in UEFA Europa League)	1	—		30	4
FCSB	2018–19	Liga I	35	11	0	0	3	1	—		38	12
FCSB	2019–20	Liga I	28	12	4	1	8	2	—		40	15
FCSB	2020–21	Liga I	19	1	1	0	2	1	0	0	22	2
FCSB	2021–22	Liga I	19	0	0	0	2 (Note: Appearances in UEFA Europa Conference League)	1	—		21	1
FCSB	2022–23	Liga I	35	8	1	0	8	2	—		44	10
FCSB	2023–24	Liga I	34	18	0	0	4	1	—		38	19
FCSB	Total		190	53	8	1	35	9	0	0	233	63
Al-Gharafa	2024–25	Qatar Stars League	12	3	—		7 (Note: Appearances in AFC Champions League Elite)	0	—		19	3
Al-Gharafa	2025–26	Qatar Stars League	15	1	2	2	8	0	1 (Note: Appearances in Amir of Qatar Cup)	0	26	3
Al-Gharafa	2026–27	Qatar Stars League	7	1	1	0	2	0	0	0	10	1
Al-Gharafa	Total		34	5	3	2	17	0	1	0	55	7
Cagliari (loan)	2024–25	Serie A	9	1	—		—		—		9	1
Career total			277	65	12	3	54	9	1	0	344	77

=== International ===
As of match played 17 November 2026

Appearances and goals by national team and year
National team	Year	Apps	Goals
Romania
Romania	2019	3	0
Romania	2020	1	0
Romania	2021	1	0
Romania	2022	0	0
Romania	2023	7	1
Romania	2024	8	1
Romania	2025	0	0
Romania	2026	4	1
Total		24	3

Scores and results list Romania's goal tally first, score column indicates score after each Coman goal.

List of international goals scored by Florinel Coman
No.	Date	Venue	Opponent	Score	Result	Competition
1	15 October 2023	Arena Națională, Bucharest, Romania	Andorra	4–0	4–0	UEFA Euro 2024 qualification
2	18 November 2024	Arena Națională, Bucharest, Romania	Cyprus	4–1	4–1	2024–25 UEFA Nations League C
3	6 June 2026	Steaua Stadium, Bucharest, Romania	Wales	1–0	2–1	Friendly

== Honours ==
Viitorul Constanța

- Liga I: 2016–17
- Supercupa României runner-up: 2017

FCSB

- Liga I: 2023–24
- Cupa României: 2019–20
- Supercupa României: 2024; runner-up: 2020

Al-Gharafa

- Amir of Qatar Cup: 2026

Individual

- Gazeta Sporturilor Romanian Footballer of the Year fifth place: 2019, 2023
- Gazeta Sporturilor Romania Player of the Month: April 2023, July 2023, April 2024
- Liga I top scorer: 2023–24 (shared with Philip Otele)
- Liga I Player of the Season: 2023–24
- Liga I Team of the Season: 2016–17, 2018–19, 2019–20, 2022–23, 2023–24
- Liga I Team of the Championship Play-Offs: 2018–19
- DigiSport Liga I Player of the Month: February 2017
