= Roger E. Brunschwig =

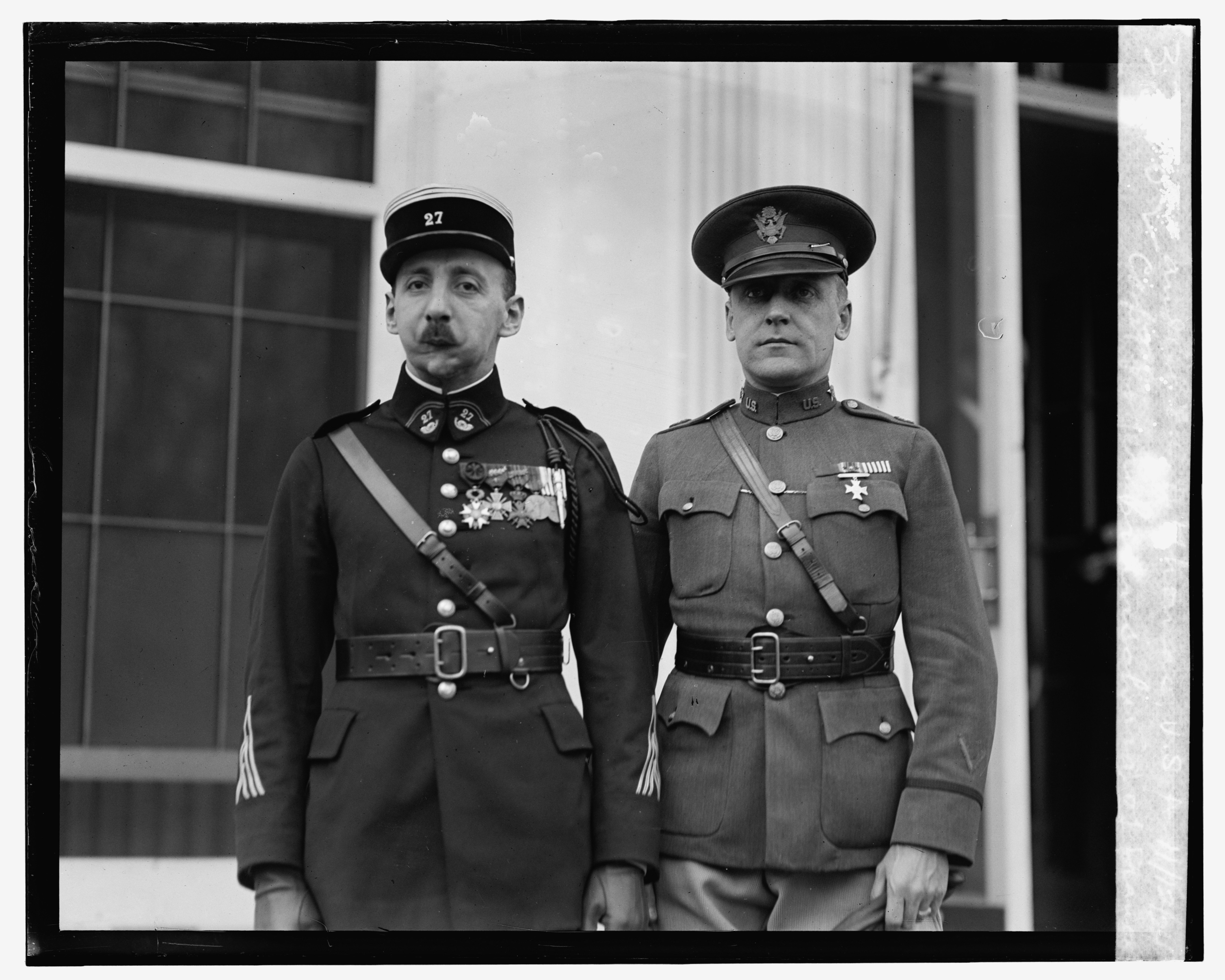
- Born: July 14, 1891
- Died: December 7, 1972 (aged 81)
- Branch: Free French Forces
- Rank: colonel

Roger Etienne Brunschwig (July 14, 1891 — December 7, 1972) was a much‐decorated French hero of the two world wars. He was decorated with the Grand-croix of the Legion of Honor in 1964 by general de Gaulle.

== WWI and after ==
After World War I, he (co) founded the Union des Blesses de la Face et de la tête (association of the wounded to the face and the head). Brunschwig was also a "discreet treasurer and financier" of the association. He served as its president 1970-1972.

== WWII ==
Brunschwig was one of the first to answer the call to arms by de Gaulle in June, 1940.

He was one of the founders of France Forever in that year.

In June, 1944, as colonel of the Free French Forces, he led the Free French Military Liaison Mission to the United States Forces. Brunschwig headed 200 French liaison officers who landed in Operation Overlord, joining the battle for the liberation of Europe.

== Personal and business ==
Roger Brunschwig joined his father, Achille who founded Brunschwig & Fils Inc. Around 1925, he brought the company to the US; soon, the company had opened showrooms in New York and other American cities. In 1929, he married Zelina Brunschwig. She joined his textile firm in 1941 as a stylist. After World War II, Brunschwig and his interior designer wife, Zelina, expanded Brunschwig & Fils to include wallpapers and trimmings.

Brunschwig died on December 7, 1972, in New York City.

== See also ==
- Gueules cassées
