= Alexandru Mitriță =

Romanian footballer (born 1995)

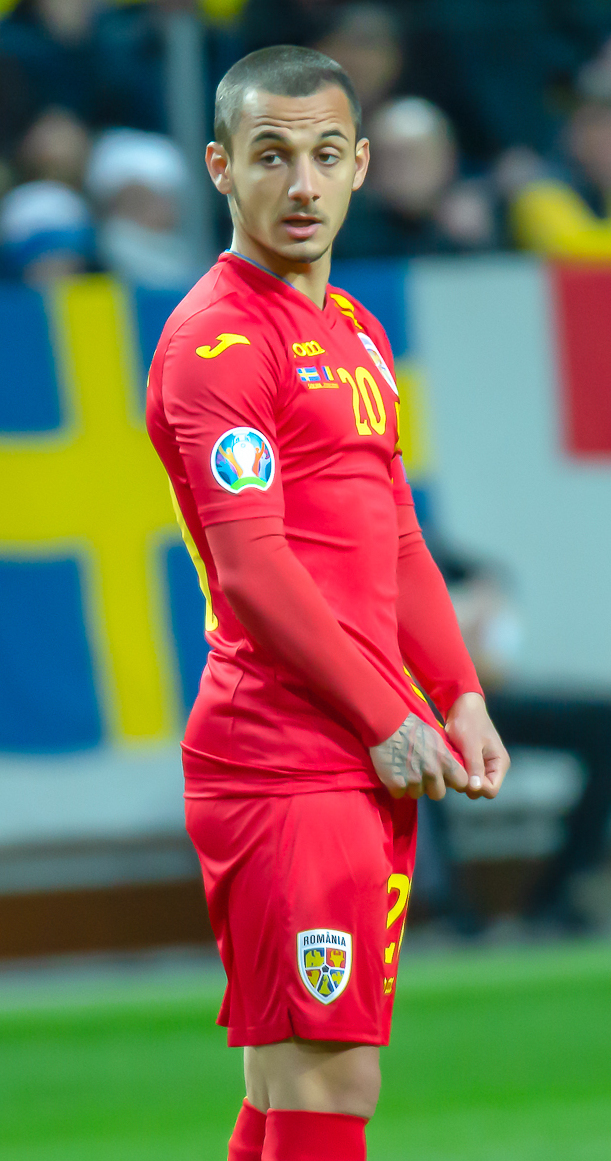
- Mitriță with Romania in 2019

Personal information
- Full name: Alexandru Ionuț Mitriță
- Date of birth: 8 February 1995 (age 31)
- Place of birth: Craiova, Romania
- Height: 1.67 m (5 ft 6 in)
- Positions: Attacking midfielder; winger

Team information
- Current team: Zhejiang FC
- Number: 28

Youth career
- 2000–2001: Universitatea Craiova
- 2001–2005: Școala de Fotbal Gheorghe Popescu
- 2005–2011: Gaz Metan CFR Craiova
- 2012–2013: Gheorghe Hagi Academy
- 2013: → Steaua București (loan)

Senior career*
Years	Team	Apps	(Gls)
2011–2012	CS Turnu Severin	5	(0)
2012–2015	Viitorul Constanța	50	(6)
2013	→ Steaua București (loan)	0	(0)
2015–2017	Pescara	34	(2)
2017	→ Universitatea Craiova (loan)	17	(7)
2018–2019	Universitatea Craiova	32	(18)
2019–2023	New York City FC	44	(16)
2020–2021	→ Al-Ahli (loan)	25	(4)
2021–2022	→ PAOK (loan)	24	(1)
2022–2023	→ Al-Raed (loan)	28	(6)
2023–2025	Universitatea Craiova	72	(35)
2025–	Zhejiang FC	40	(20)

International career^{‡}
2011	Romania U17	3	(0)
2013–2014	Romania U19	11	(4)
2014–2015	Romania U21	8	(1)
2018–2025	Romania	26	(4)
- * Club domestic league appearances and goals as of 25 October 2026 ‡ National team caps and goals as of 5 September 2025

Alexandru Ionuț Mitriță (Romanian pronunciation: [alekˈsandru joˈnuts miˈtritsə]; born 8 February 1995) is a Romanian professional footballer who plays as an attacking midfielder or a winger for Chinese Super League club Zhejiang FC.

Mitriță represented several teams in his country before transferring abroad to Pescara in 2015, at age 20. After two years in Italy, he returned to Romania on an initial loan at his hometown club Universitatea Craiova, becoming an undisputed starter and winning the Cupa României in the 2017–18 season. His performances inspired a move to American team New York City FC in 2019, joining them as a Designated Player for a €8 million (US$9.1 million) transfer fee. Following several loans to Saudi Arabia and Greece, Mitriță returned to Craiova in the summer of 2023.

Internationally, Mitriță was capped by Romania at several youth levels before making his full debut in March 2018, in a 2–1 friendly win over Israel. He scored his first goal for the nation on 12 October 2019, in a 3–0 away win over the Faroe Islands.

== Club career ==
=== Early career and Viitorul Constanța ===
Born in Craiova, Mitriță started his senior career with Gaz Metan Severin in 2011, and during early 2013 joined Viitorul Constanța. In September that year, aged 18, he was loaned by FC Steaua București to play for their UEFA Youth League side; his senior output for the club consisted in only one match in the Cupa României, and he returned to Viitorul the following year.

Mitriță played his first match upon his return on 23 February 2014, in a 2–1 away win against Dinamo București. He recorded his first Liga I goal on 21 May that year, in a 1–0 victory over Ceahlăul Piatra Neamț.

=== Pescara ===
In July 2015, Mitriță was transferred to Italian club Pescara for an undisclosed fee, rumoured to be worth around €1 million. He made 20 appearances and scored one goal in all competitions in his debut campaign, as the team achieved promotion to the Serie A. Mitriță's first goal in the Italian top division came on 22 May 2017, in a 2–0 home defeat of Palermo.

=== Universitatea Craiova ===
On 21 July 2017, Universitatea Craiova announced an agreement for the loan of Mitriță from Pescara. He made his competitive and European debut six days later, in a 1–0 home loss to AC Milan in the third qualifying round of the Europa League. His first goal came in a 1–1 league draw with Astra Giurgiu on 6 August. On 20 August, Mitriță scored the goals of a 2–0 win against his former team Viitorul.

On 16 December 2017, Mitriță converted a free kick in a 2–1 victory over eventual champions CFR Cluj. A few days earlier, press reported that Craiova had signed him on a permanent basis; the deal was confirmed on 17 January 2018, with the Alb-albaștrii paying a previously agreed €730,000 and Pescara retaining 15% interest. He netted his first goal of 2018 on 10 March, an 82nd-minute winner against Astra Giurgiu. On 14 April, Mitriță scored his first career hat-trick in a 4–1 home defeat of Politehnica Iași. In the Cupa României final on 27 May, he scored a goal and was named Man of the Match in a 2–0 win over Liga II side Hermannstadt. He went on to finish his first campaign in Craiova with 38 appearances and 16 goals across all competitions, being selected by the LPF in the best team of the championship play-offs.

In July 2018, Mitriță gained team captaincy and played in the 1–0 Supercupa României loss to CFR Cluj. By the first half of the regular season in late October, he shared the top scorer position with FCSB striker Harlem Gnohéré after netting nine goals. On 9 November, he was sent off in the 57th minute of a 1–1 draw with Sepsi OSK after being booked twice for diving; Mitriță also cursed referee Radu Petrescu, but was only given a one-match suspension. The incident did not prevent him from later being nominated for Gazeta Sporturilor's 2018 Romanian Footballer of the Year award. On 19 December, in the closing fixture of the calendar year, he scored his fourth double of the campaign in a 2–0 victory against Gaz Metan Mediaș.

=== New York City FC ===
On 4 February 2019, Mitriță officially joined Major League Soccer club New York City FC as a Designated Player. Craiova revealed that the transfer fee was worth €8 million (US$9.1 million), which made him the third-most expensive sale of the Romanian championship at the time. Mitriță registered his debut on 8 February, celebrating his birthday by opening the scoring in a 1–1 friendly draw with Swedish team AIK in Abu Dhabi. In the season opener on 2 March, Mitriță assisted captain Alexander Ring in a 2–2 draw at Orlando City. He netted his first competitive goal on the 17th that month, in a 2–2 draw with Los Angeles FC.

Mitriță became a regular goalscorer at New York City, and managed a hat-trick on 25 September in a 4–1 defeat of MLS Cup 2018 champions Atlanta United. The club lost the next and final regular fixture against New England Revolution, but still finished top of the Eastern Conference. On 23 October, Mitriță played the full 90 minutes in a 2–1 loss to Toronto FC in the Conference semifinals, ending the year with 32 appearances and thirteen goals all competitions comprised. His individual performances earned him fourth place in Gazeta Sporturilor's 2019 Romanian Footballer of the Year award.

==== Various loans ====
On 8 October 2020, Mitriță moved to Saudi Professional League side Al-Ahli on loan until 31 January 2022. Travel restrictions imposed due to the COVID-19 pandemic which did not allow him to be closer to his expecting wife were cited as the reason for the transfer. He totalled 30 games and four goals in all competitions for the Jeddah side, before terminating his contract early in August 2021.

Mitriță was again loaned out on 31 August 2021, joining Romanian coach Răzvan Lucescu at Greek team PAOK until the end of the season. He made his debut on 12 September, replacing Shinji Kagawa in the 63rd minute of a 1–0 home loss to PAS Giannina. On 9 February 2022, he scored a last-minute winner in a 2–1 victory over AEK Athens in the quarter-finals of the Greek Cup.

On 25 July 2022, Mitriță returned to the Saudi Professional League by joining Al-Raed on a year-long loan.

=== Return to Universitatea Craiova ===
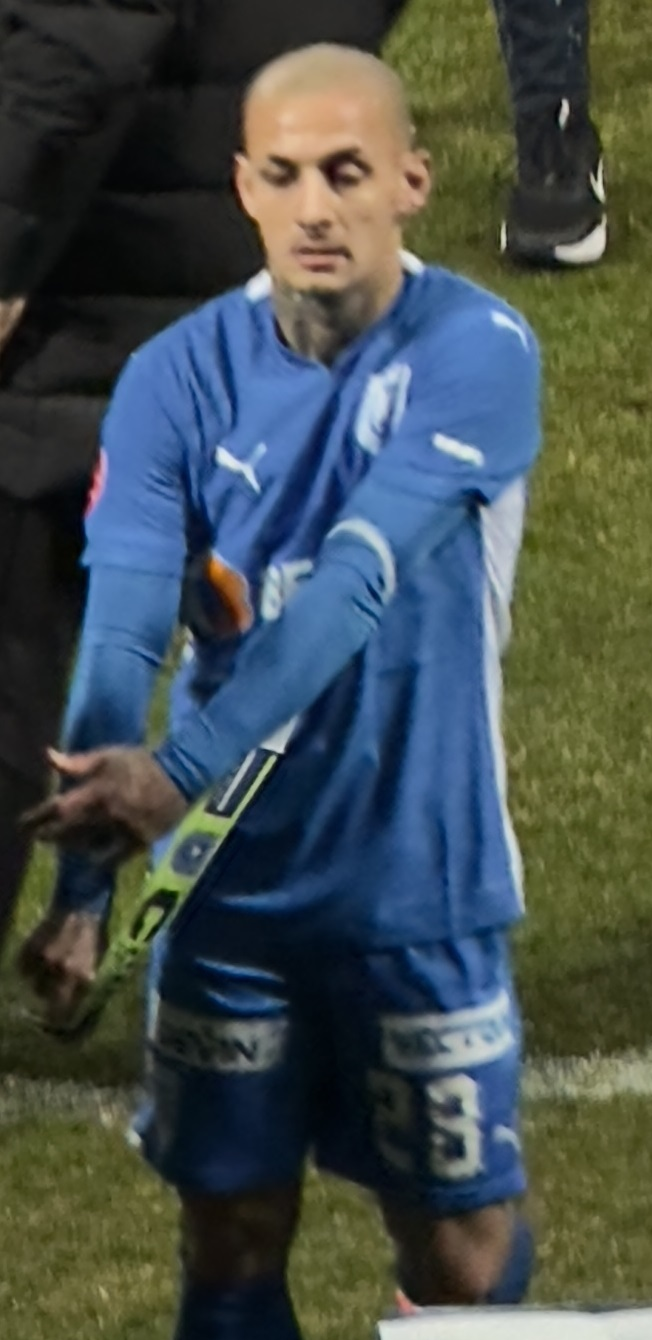
Mitriță playing for Universitatea Craiova in a 3–2 away win over Petrolul Ploiești, 29 February 2024.

On 1 June 2023, Mitriță confirmed that he returned to Universitatea Craiova by signing a three-year contract. On 18 July, on his second debut for the team and his 100th Liga I match, he obtained a penalty and provided an assist in a 2–0 away win over rival Dinamo București. He scored his first goal upon return on 12 August, in a 4–1 away league defeat of newly promoted Politehnica Iași.

On 26 November 2023, Mitriță scored his first hat-trick in a 3–1 away victory over Oțelul Galați, also newly promoted to the Liga I. He reached ten goals in the league after opening a 1–1 home draw with Rapid București, on 4 March 2024. On 13 May, he scored his second hat-trick of the season in a 3–3 away draw at Farul Constanța, of which two goals came from the penalty spot. Mitriță finished the 2023–24 Liga I season with 16 goals in 35 matches, coming fourth in the top scorers ranking.

On 1 August 2024, Mitriță scored his first European goal for Craiova in a 3–2 home victory over Maribor in the Conference League second qualifying round (3–4 loss on aggregate). On 18 August, he extended his link until 2028 with a €5 million release clause.

During the 2024–25 Liga I season, Mitriță recorded a career-best 19 goals in 37 appearances, finishing as the league's second-highest scorer behind Louis Munteanu, who netted 23 times. Despite Universitatea Craiova placing third in the standings, Mitriță was named Player of the Season.

=== Zhejiang FC ===
On 23 June 2025, Mitriță transferred to Chinese Super League side Zhejiang FC, signing a three-and-a-half-year deal for a rumoured €2 million fee. He made his debut two days later, entering as a half-time substitute and contributing with two goals and an assist in a 3–0 away victory over Qingdao Hainiu.

In July 2025, Mitriță played two matches in the Chinese Super League, proving decisive in both. He scored twice in a 3–1 victory over Yunnan Yukun, and netted a late winner in a 3–2 triumph against Wuhan Three Towns, which earned him the league's Player of the Month award.

== International career ==
In March 2018, after reportedly impressing head coach Cosmin Contra, Mitriță was called up by the Romania national team for the friendlies with Israel and Sweden later that month. He made his debut against the former opponent on 24 March, and assisted George Țucudean's goal in the 2–1 victory in Netanya.

Mitriță scored his first senior international goal on 12 October 2019, aiding to a 3–0 away win over the Faroe Islands after replacing Florinel Coman in the 69th minute. Three days later, he netted again in a 1–1 draw with Norway, also counting for the UEFA Euro 2020 qualifiers.

On 11 October 2021, Mitriță scored a header in a 1–0 win over Armenia in the 2022 FIFA World Cup qualifiers, representing Romania's first goal at the new Stadionul Steaua in Bucharest. From September 2022 to June 2024, he was not included in Romania squads due to a reported conflict with head coach Edward Iordănescu and several teammates, which ultimately led to him not being selected for Euro 2024.

Following the departure of Iordănescu, Mircea Lucescu named Mitriță to the Romania squad on 30 August 2024. He came on as a substitute in both Nations League matches against Kosovo (3–0 away win) and Lithuania (3–1 home win), also scoring a goal in the latter match.

On 22 September 2025, Mitriță announced his retirement from the national team in an open letter, explaining that the long travel distances from China and his wish to focus on his future and family influenced his decision.

== Style of play ==
Mitriță is deployed as an attacking midfielder or a winger on either flank, having been noted for his pace and technical ability which allow him to take on opponents in one-on-one situations.

== Personal life ==
Mitriță's paternal uncle, Dumitru, was also a professional footballer and played for several clubs including Universitatea Craiova and Steaua București. Mitriță stated that growing up he idolised Lionel Messi and looked to emulate him.

In October 2018, after two-time Romanian Footballer of the Year winner and Craiova legend Ilie Balaci died, Mitriță tattooed a piece of advice he was given by him on the back of his neck.

== Career statistics ==
=== Club ===
As of match played 25 October 2026

Appearances and goals by club, season and competition
Club	Season	League			National cup (Note: Includes Cupa României, Coppa Italia, U.S. Open Cup, King's Cup, Greek Football Cup, Chinese FA Cup)		League cup (Note: Includes Cupa Ligii)		Continental		Other		Total	
Club	Season	Division	Apps	Goals	Apps	Goals	Apps	Goals	Apps	Goals	Apps	Goals	Apps	Goals
CS Turnu Severin	2010–11	Liga II	2	0	—		—		—		—		2	0
CS Turnu Severin	2011–12	Liga II	3	0	0	0	—		—		—		3	0
CS Turnu Severin	Total		5	0	0	0	—		—		—		5	0
Viitorul Constanța	2012–13	Liga I	7	0	0	0	—		—		—		7	0
Viitorul Constanța	2013–14	Liga I	15	1	0	0	—		—		—		15	1
Viitorul Constanța	2014–15	Liga I	27	5	0	0	2	1	—		—		29	6
Viitorul Constanța	2015–16	Liga I	1	0	0	0	0	0	—		—		1	0
Viitorul Constanța	Total		50	6	0	0	2	1	—		—		52	7
Steaua București (loan)	2013–14	Liga I	0	0	1	0	—		0	0	—		1	0
Pescara	2015–16	Serie B	19	1	1	0	—		—		—		20	1
Pescara	2016–17	Serie A	15	1	2	0	—		—		—		17	1
Pescara	Total		34	2	3	0	—		—		—		37	2
Universitatea Craiova	2017–18	Liga I	31	12	5	4	—		2 (Note: Appearances in UEFA Europa League)	0	—		38	16
Universitatea Craiova	2018–19	Liga I	18	13	1	0	—		2	0	1 (Note: Appearance in Supercupa României)	0	22	13
Universitatea Craiova	Total		49	25	6	4	—		4	0	1	0	60	29
New York City FC	2019	MLS	30	12	2	1	—		0	0	—		32	13
New York City FC	2020	MLS	14	4	0	0	—		3 (Note: Appearances in CONCACAF Champions League)	1	—		17	5
New York City FC	Total		44	16	2	1	—		3	1	0	0	49	18
Al-Ahli (loan)	2020–21	Saudi Pro League	25	4	1	0	—		3 (Note: Appearances in AFC Champions League)	0	—		29	4
PAOK (loan)	2021–22	Super League Greece	24	1	5	1	—		9 (Note: Appearances in UEFA Conference League)	1	—		38	3
Al-Raed (loan)	2022–23	Saudi Pro League	28	6	0	0	—		—		—		28	6
Universitatea Craiova	2023–24	Liga I	35	16	3	0	—		—		1 (Note: Appearance in Liga I European play-offs)	0	39	16
Universitatea Craiova	2024–25	Liga I	37	19	3	1	—		2	1	—		42	21
Universitatea Craiova	Total		72	35	6	1	—		2	1	1	0	82	37
Zhejiang FC	2025	Chinese Super League	16	8	—		—		—		—		16	8
Zhejiang FC	2026	Chinese Super League	24	12	1	0	—		—		—		25	12
Zhejiang FC	Total		40	20	1	0	—		—		—		41	20
Career total			370	115	25	7	2	1	24	3	2	0	424	126

=== International ===
As of match played 5 September 2025

Appearances and goals by national team and year
National team	Year	Apps	Goals
Romania
Romania	2018	6	0
Romania	2019	5	2
Romania	2020	3	0
Romania	2021	2	1
Romania	2022	2	0
Romania	2023	0	0
Romania	2024	3	1
Romania	2025	5	0
Total		26	4

Scores and results list Romania's goal tally first, score column indicates score after each Mitriță goal.

List of international goals scored by Alexandru Mitriță
No.	Date	Venue	Cap	Opponent	Score	Result	Competition
1	12 October 2019	Tórsvøllur, Tórshavn, Faroe Islands	8	Faroe Islands	2–0	3–0	UEFA Euro 2020 qualification
2	15 October 2019	Arena Națională, Bucharest, Romania	9	Norway	1–0	1–1	UEFA Euro 2020 qualification
3	11 October 2021	Stadionul Steaua, Bucharest, Romania	16	Armenia	1–0	1–0	2022 FIFA World Cup qualification
4	9 September 2024	Stadionul Steaua, Bucharest, Romania	20	Lithuania	3–1	3–1	2024–25 UEFA Nations League C

== Honours ==
Universitatea Craiova

- Cupa României: 2017–18
- Supercupa României runner-up: 2018

PAOK

- Greek Cup runner-up: 2021–22

Individual

- Liga I Player of the Season: 2024–25
- Gazeta Sporturilor Romania Player of the Month: March 2024
- Liga I Team of the Season: 2017–18, 2023–24, 2024–25
- Liga I Team of the Regular Season: 2018–19, 2023–24
- Liga I Team of the Championship Play-Offs: 2017–18
