= List of most expensive Romanian football transfers =

The following is a list of most expensive association football transfers in Romania, which details the highest transfer fees ever paid for players in the Liga I.

The current record is held by Dennis Man, after Parma signed him from FCSB in a deal worth €11 million plus add-ons, on 29 January 2021. The previous transfer record had been held by Nicolae Stanciu since 2017, who was bought by Anderlecht for €9.8 million, also from FCSB.

== Outgoing Liga I transfers ==
Top 25 outgoing Liga I transfers
R	Year	Name	Nat.	From	To	Fee (€ mln)	Reference(s)
1	2021	Dennis Man	(Romania)	FCSB	(Italy) Parma	€11 (Note: FCSB could receive an additional €2 million in bonuses)	
2	2016	Nicolae Stanciu	(Romania)	FC Steaua București	(Belgium) Anderlecht	€9.8 (Note: Initial €7.8 million plus reported €2 million bonuses)	
3	2013	Vlad Chiricheș	(Romania)	FC Steaua București	(England) Tottenham Hotspur	€9.5	
4	2020	Valentin Mihăilă	(Romania)	Universitatea Craiova	(Italy) Parma	€8.5	
5	2019	Alexandru Mitriță	(Romania)	Universitatea Craiova	(United States) New York City FC	€8 (Note: Universitatea Craiova general manager Marcel Popescu revealed the transfer fee to be US$9.1 million (roughly €8 million))	
6	2014	Florin Gardoș	(Romania)	FC Steaua București	(England) Southampton	€6.8	
7	2021	Alexandru Cicaldau	(Romania)	Universitatea Craiova	(Turkey) Galatasaray	€6.5	
7	2009	Álvaro Pereira	(Uruguay)	CFR Cluj	(Portugal) Porto	€6.5	
7	2000	Adrian Mutu	(Romania)	Dinamo București	(Italy) Inter Milan	€6.5	
10	2011	Lacina Traoré	(Ivory Coast)	CFR Cluj	(Russia) Kuban Krasnodar	€6	
10	2009	Mirel Rădoi	(Romania)	FC Steaua București	(Saudi Arabia) Al-Hilal	€6	
12	2024	Florinel Coman	(Romania)	FCSB	(Qatar) Al Gharafa	€5.25	
13	2022	Rareș Ilie	(Romania)	Rapid București	(France) Nice	€5	
13	2011	Gabriel Torje	(Romania)	Dinamo București	(Italy) Udinese	€5	
13	2008	Cristian Săpunaru	(Romania)	Rapid București	(Portugal) Porto	€5	
13	2011	Bogdan Stancu	(Romania)	FC Steaua București	(Turkey) Galatasaray	€5	
17	2008	Ștefan Radu	(Romania)	Dinamo București	(Italy) Lazio	€4.5	
17	2017	Răzvan Marin	(Romania)	Viitorul Constanța	(Belgium) Standard Liège	€4.5	
17	2019	Ianis Hagi	(Romania)	Viitorul Constanța	(Belgium) Genk	€4.5	
20	1990	Gheorghe Hagi	(Romania)	Steaua București	(Spain) Real Madrid	€4.3	
21	2021	Olimpiu Morutan	(Romania)	Steaua București	(Turkey) Galatasaray	€4.1	
22	2008	Ionuț Mazilu	(Romania)	Rapid București	(Ukraine) Dnipro	€4	
23	1994	Ilie Dumitrescu	(Romania)	Steaua București	(England) Tottenham Hotspur	€3.7	
24	2013	Rafael Bastos	(Brazil)	CFR Cluj	(Saudi Arabia) Al Nassr	€3.5	
24	2024	Philip Otele	(Nigeria)	CFR Cluj	(United Arab Emirates) Al Wahda	€3.5	

=== Historical progression ===
Year	Name	Nat.	From	To	Fee (€ mln)
1982	Marcel Raducanu	(Romania)	Steaua Bucuresti	(Germany) Borussia Dortmund	€0.275
1989	Gavril Balint	(Romania)	Steaua Bucuresti	(Spain) Real Burgos	€1
1990	Gheorghe Hagi	(Romania)	Steaua Bucuresti	(Spain) Real Madrid	€4.3
2000	Adrian Mutu	(Romania)	Dinamo Bucuresti	(Italy) Inter Milan	€6.5
2013	Vlad Chiriches	(Romania)	FCSB	(England) Tottenham Hotspur	€9.5
2016	Nicolae Stanciu	(Romania)	FCSB	(Belgium) Anderlecht	€9.8
2021	Dennis Man	(Romania)	FCSB	(Italy) Parma	€11

== Incoming Liga I transfers ==
Top 25 ongoing Liga I transfers
R	Year	Name	Nat.	From	To	Fee (€ mln)
1	2017	Florinel Coman	(Romania)	(Romania) Viitorul Constanța	FCSB	€3
1	2007	Cristian Fabbiani	(Argentina)	(Argentina) Lanus	CFR Cluj	€3
3	2018	Ianis Hagi	(Romania)	(Italy) Fiorentina	Viitorul Constanța	€2.8
4	2008	Álvaro Pereira	(Uruguay)	(Argentina) Argentinos Juniors	CFR Cluj	€2.5
5	2018	Alexandru Cicaldau	(Romania)	(Romania) Viitorul Constanța	Universitatea Craiova	€2.3
5	2024	Louis Munteanu	(Romania)	(Italy) Fiorentina	CFR Cluj	€2.3
7	2017	Dragos Nedelcu	(Romania)	(Romania) Viitorul Constanța	FCSB	€2.13
8	2017	Denis Alibec	(Romania)	(Romania) Astra Giurgiu	FCSB	€2.04
9	2011	Adrian Cristea	(Romania)	(Romania) Dinamo Bucuresti	Universitatea Cluj	€2
9	2008	Bogdan Stancu	(Romania)	(Romania) Unirea Urziceni	FCSB	€2
9	2008	Gabriel Torje	(Romania)	(Romania) Poli Timisoara	Dinamo Bucuresti	€2
9	2024	Daniel Birligea	(Romania)	(Romania) CFR Cluj	FCSB	€2
13	2012	Alexandru Chipciu	(Romania)	(Romania) Brasov	FCSB	€1.95
14	2016	Dennis Man	(Romania)	(Romania) UTA Arad	FCSB	€1.85
15	2009	Cristian Tanase	(Romania)	(Romania) FC Arges	FCSB	€1.8
16	2008	Dayro Moreno	(Colombia)	(Colombia) Once Caldas	FCSB	€1.75
17	2022	David Miculescu	(Romania)	(Romania) UTA Arad	FCSB	€1.7
18	2007	Élton	(Brazil)	(Brazil) Corinthians	FCSB	€1.65
19	2007	Ionut Rada	(Romania)	(Romania) Rapid Bucuresti	FCSB	€1.6
20	2022	Andrea Compagno	(Romania)	(Romania) FC U Craiova 1948	FCSB	€1.5
20	2019	Andrei Ivan	(Romania)	(Russia) Krasnodar	Universitatea Craiova	€1.5
20	2016	Florin Tanase	(Romania)	(Romania) Viitorul Constanța	FCSB	€1.5
20	2009	Ciprian Tatarusanu	(Romania)	(Romania) Gloria Bistrița	FCSB	€1.5
20	2009	Wesley	(Brazil)	(Portugal) Leixoes	Vaslui	€1.5
20	2008	Juliano Spadacio	(Brazil)	(Portugal) Nacional	Rapid Bucuresti	€1.5
20	2009	Alexandru Curtean	(Romania)	(Romania) Gaz Metan Medias	Poli Timisoara	€1.5
20	2008	Janos Szekely	(Romania)	(Romania) Otelul Galati	FCSB	€1.5
20	2008	Urko Pardo	(Cyprus)	(Greece) Iraklis	Rapid Bucuresti	€1.5
20	2008	Juan Carlos Toja	(Colombia)	(United States) FC Dallas	FCSB	€1.5
20	2008	Dorin Goga	(Romania)	(Romania) Universitatea Cluj	Poli Timisoara	€1.5
20	2006	Ionut Mazilu	(Romania)	(Romania) Sportul Studentesc	Rapid Bucuresti	€1.5
20	2006	Ovidiu Petre	(Romania)	(Romania) Poli Timisoara	FCSB	€1.5

=== Historical progression ===
Year	Name	Nat.	From	To	Fee (€ mln)
1990	Gheorghe Craioveanu	(Romania)	(Romania) Turnu Severin	FC Universitatea Craiova	€0.005
1991	Constantin Galca	(Romania)	(Romania) FC Arges	FC Steaua Bucuresti	€0.1
1994	Bogdan Stelea	(Romania)	(Belgium) Standard Liege	Rapid Bucuresti	€0.15
1995	Bogdan Stelea	(Romania)	(Turkey) Samsunspor	FC Steaua Bucuresti	€0.7
2004	Dorin Goian	(Romania)	(Romania) FCM Bacau	FCSB	€1.3
2006	Ovidiu Petre	(Romania)	(Romania) Poli Timisoara	FCSB	€1.5
2007	Élton	(Brazil)	(Brazil) Corinthians	FCSB	€1.65
2007	Cristian Fabbiani	(Argentina)	(Argentina) Lanus	CFR Cluj	€3

== Highest transfer payments for Romanian players ==
R	Year	Name	From	To	Fee (€ mln)
1	2024	Radu Dragusin	(Italy) Genoa	(England) Tottenham Hotspur	€25
2	2003	Adrian Mutu	(Italy) Parma	(England) Chelsea	€22.7
3	2003	Cristian Chivu	(Netherlands) Ajax	(Italy) AS Roma	€18
4	2007	Cristian Chivu	(Italy) AS Roma	(Italy) Inter Milan	€16
5	2019	Razvan Marin	(Belgium) Standard Liege	(Netherlands) Ajax	€12.5
6	2019	Dennis Man	(Romania) FCSB	(Italy) Parma	€11
7	2019	Andrei Radu	(Italy) Genoa	(Italy) Inter Milan	€10.6
8	2021	Razvan Marin	(Netherlands) Ajax	(Italy) Cagliari	€10
8	2019	Nicolae Stanciu	(Czech Republic) Sparta Prague	(Saudi Arabia) Al Ahli	€10
8	2002	Adrian Mutu	(Italy) Hellas Verona	(Italy) Parma	€10
11	2023	Radu Dragusin	(Italy) Juventus	(Italy) Genoa	€9.7
11	2016	Nicolae Stanciu	(Romania) FCSB	(Belgium) Anderlecht	€9.7
13	2020	Vlad Chiriches	(Italy) Napoli	(Italy) Sassuolo	€9.5
13	2013	Vlad Chiriches	(Romania) FCSB	(England) Tottenham Hotspur	€9.5
15	2020	Valentin Mihaila	(Romania) Universitatea Craiova	(Italy) Parma	€9.1
16	2019	Andrei Radu	(Italy) Inter Milan	(Italy) Genoa	€8
16	2019	Alexandru Mitrita	(Romania) Universitatea Craiova	(United States) New York City FC	€8
16	2006	Adrian Mutu	(Italy) Juventus	(Italy) Fiorentina	€8
19	2019	George Puscas	(Italy) Inter Milan	(England) Reading	€7.5
20	2015	Vlad Chiriches	(England) Tottenham Hotspur	(Italy) Napoli	€7
20	2007	Ciprian Marica	(Ukraine) Shakhtar Donetsk	(Germany) Stuttgart	€7
20	2001	Cosmin Contra	(Spain) Deportivo Alaves	(Italy) AC Milan	€7
23	2014	Florin Gardos	(Romania) FCSB	(England) Southampton	€6.8
24	2000	Adrian Mutu	(Romania) Dinamo Bucuresti	(Italy) Inter Milan	€6.5
24	2021	Alexandru Cicaldau	(Romania) Universitatea Craiova	(Turkey) Galatasaray	€6.5

=== Historical progression ===
Year	Name	From	To	Fee (€ mln)
1982	Marcel Raducanu	(Romania) Steaua Bucuresti	(Germany) Borussia Dortmund	€0.275
1989	Gavril Balint	(Romania) Steaua Bucuresti	(Spain) Real Burgos	€1
1990	Gheorghe Hagi	(Romania) Steaua Bucuresti	(Spain) Real Madrid	€4
1992	Florin Raducioiu	(Italy) Hellas Verona	(Italy) Brescia	€4.5
2000	Adrian Mutu	(Romania) Dinamo Bucuresti	(Italy) Inter Milan	€6.5
2001	Cosmin Contra	(Spain) Deportivo Alaves	(Italy) AC Milan	€7
2002	Adrian Mutu	(Italy) Hellas Verona	(Italy) Parma	€10
2003	Cristian Chivu	(Netherlands) Ajax	(Italy) AS Roma	€18
2003	Adrian Mutu	(Italy) Parma	(England) Chelsea	€22.7
2024	Radu Dragusin	(Italy) Genoa	(England) Tottenham Hotspur	€25

== Gallery ==
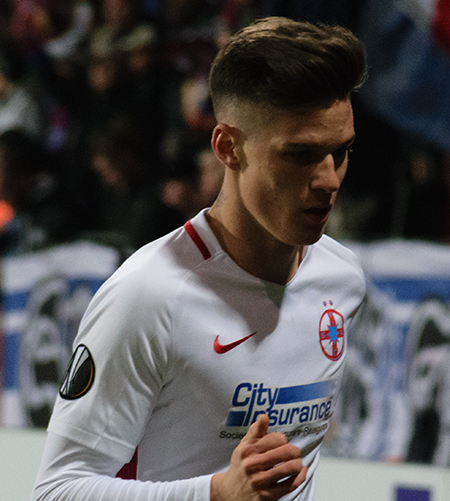
Dennis Man, the most expensive sale of the Romanian league championship.

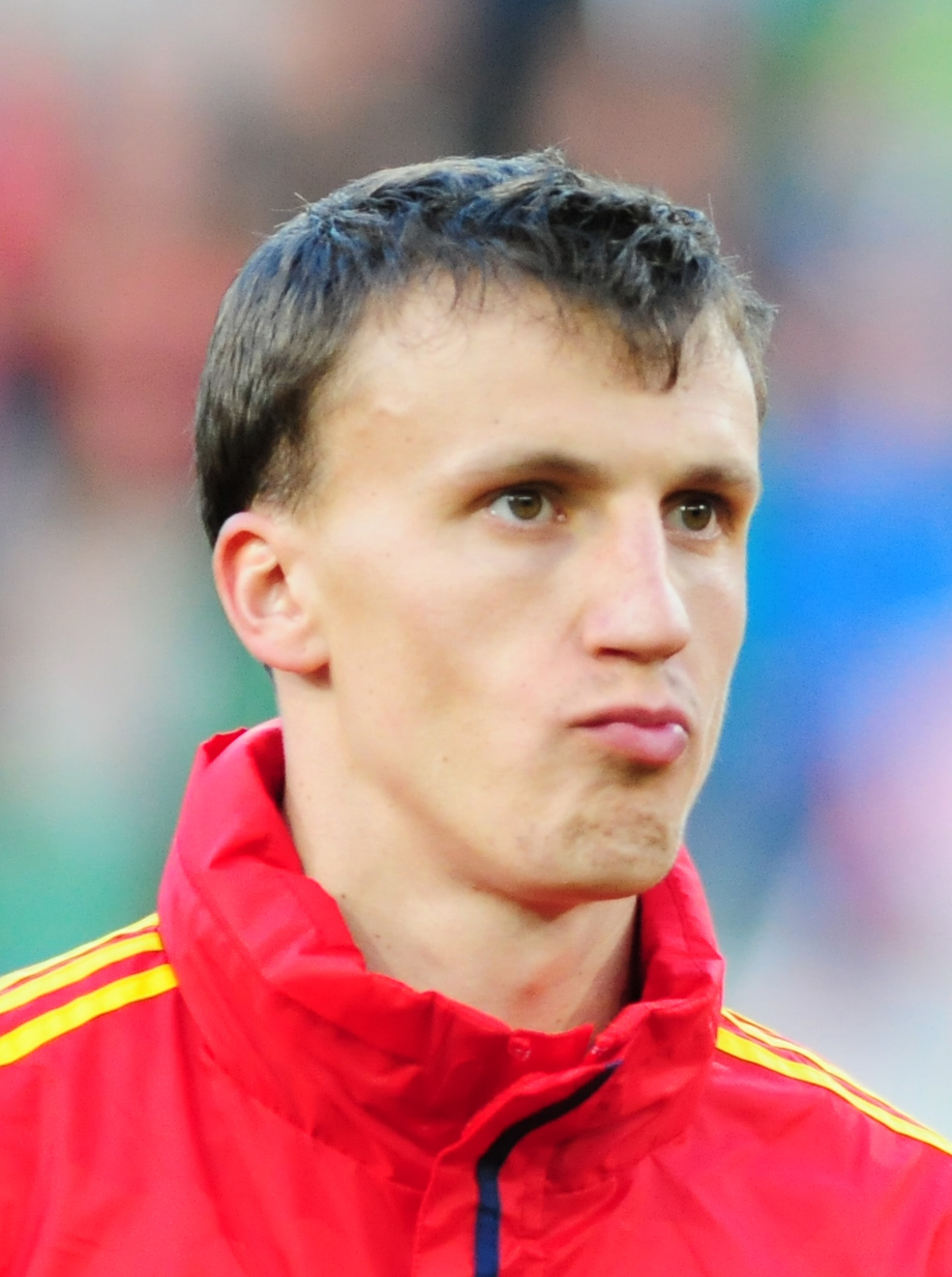
Vlad Chiricheș, the most expensive defender.

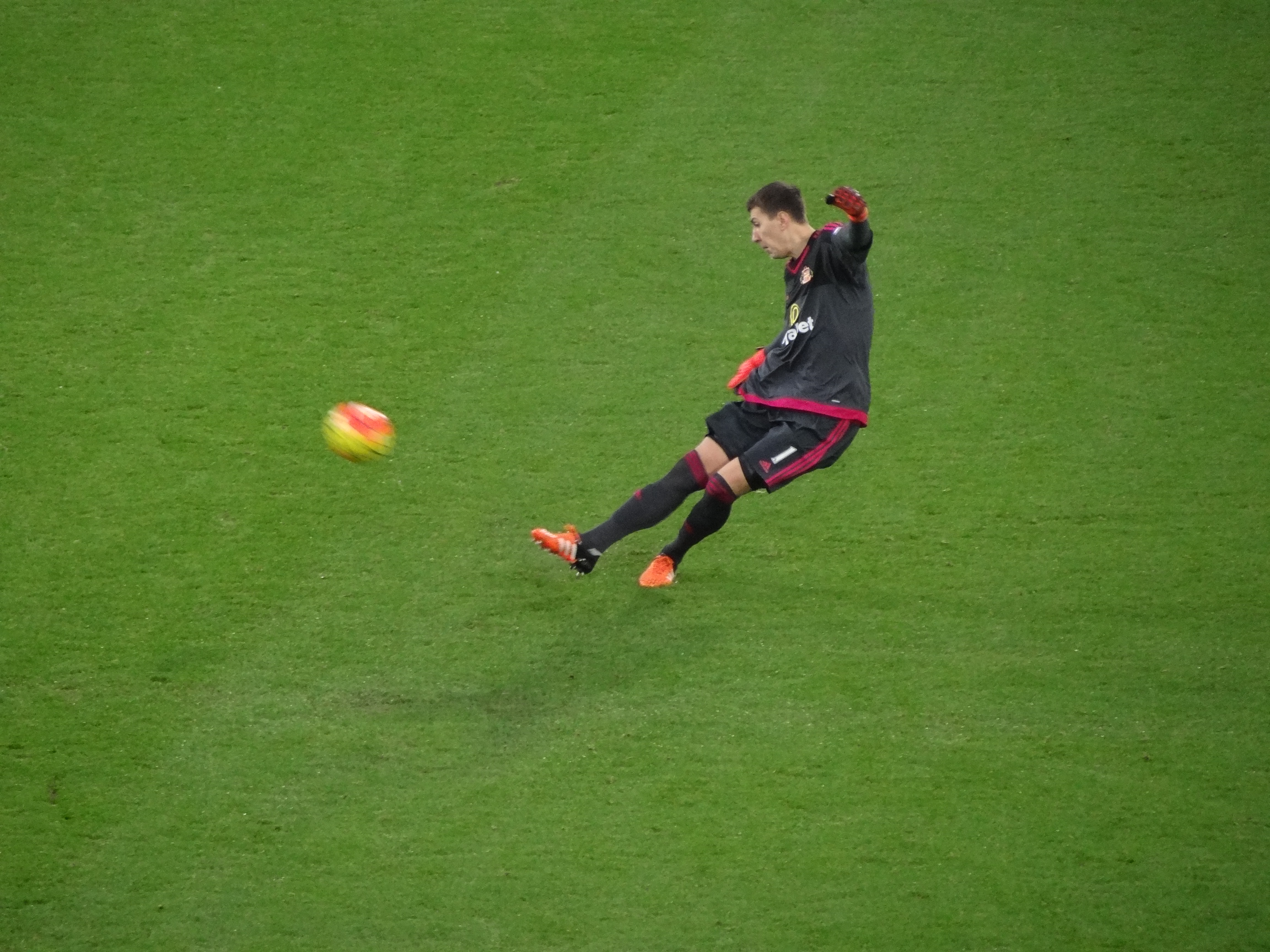
Costel Pantilimon, the most expensive goalkeeper.

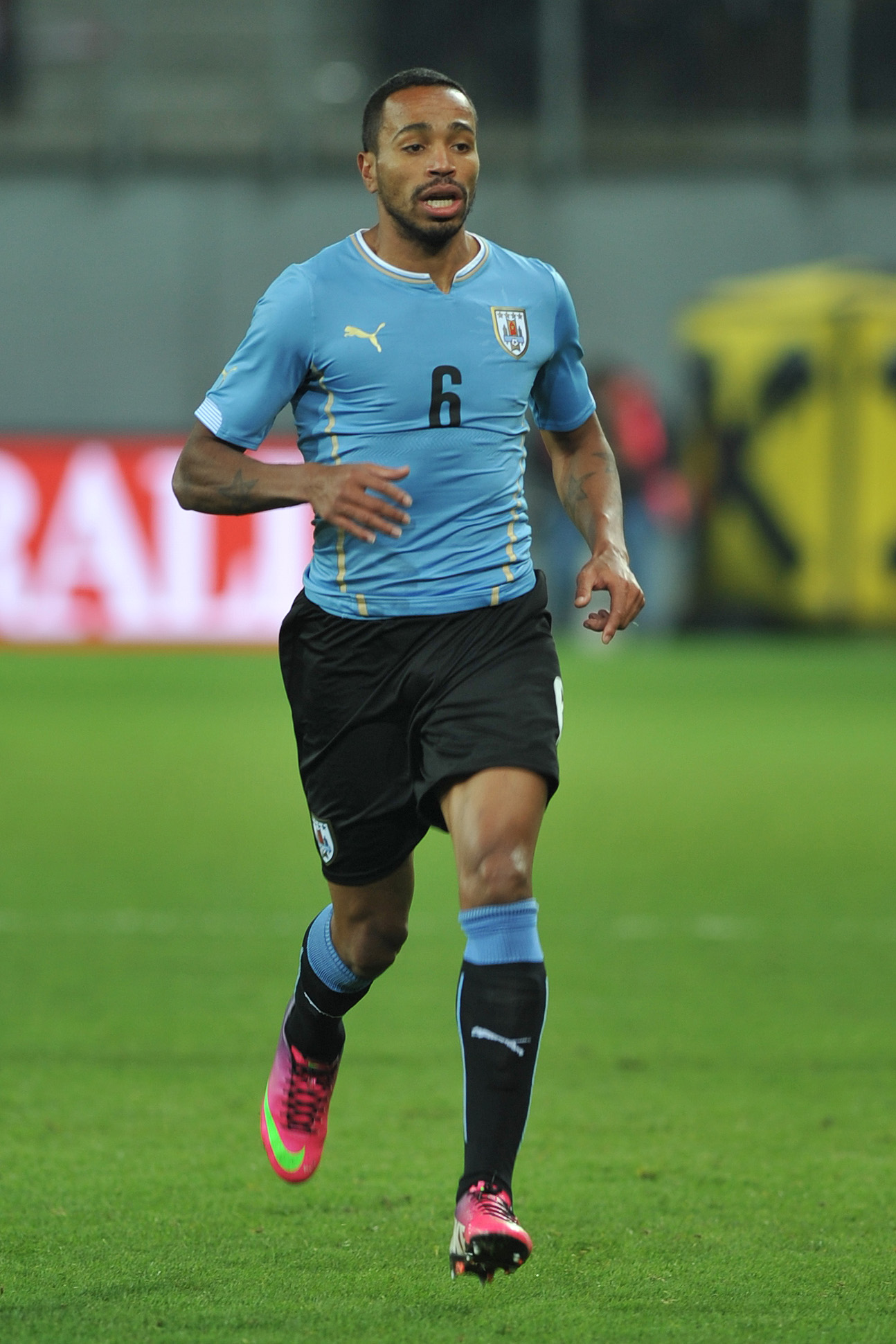
Álvaro Pereira, the most expensive foreigner.
