= Comănescu =

Comănescu or Comănesco is a Romanian-language surname. Notable people with the surname include:

- Lazăr Comănescu (born 1949), Romanian diplomat
- Nicolae Comănescu (born 1968), Romanian painter

== See also ==
- Comănescu River
- Coman (disambiguation)
- Comăneci
