= Gazeta Sporturilor Monthly Football Awards =

Romanian football trophy

The Gazeta Sporturilor Monthly Football Awards are association football awards presented monthly by Romania's largest and most read sports-related publication, Gazeta Sporturilor. They were first handed out in September 2021, and honour players and managers deemed to have been the best over the previous month in Romania.

The award is not affiliated with the country's top flight competition, the Liga I—instead, voters can also choose between Romanian players and coaches who are competing abroad. Foreign footballers and coaches from Romania's first league are eligible as well. As of May 2023, Gheorghe Hagi has won the trophy for Manager of the Month five times, a record in both categories.

== List of winners ==
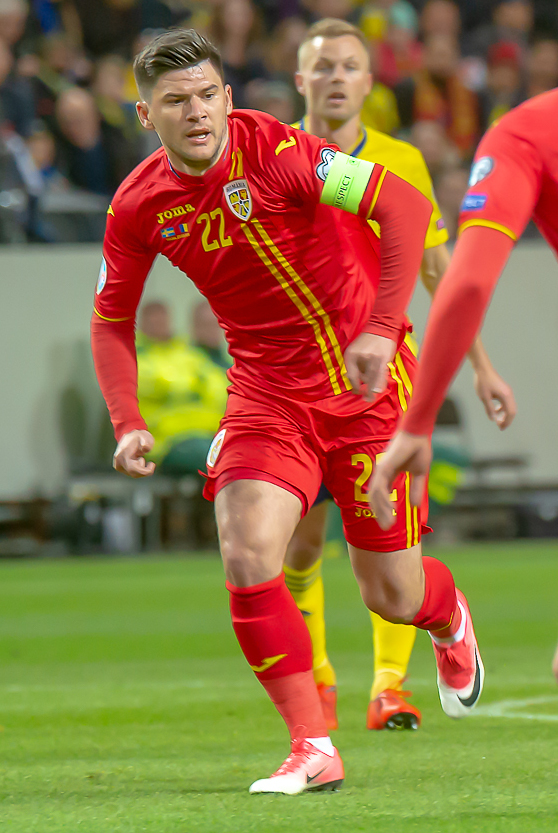
Cristian Săpunaru was the inaugural Player of the Month award winner for August 2021.

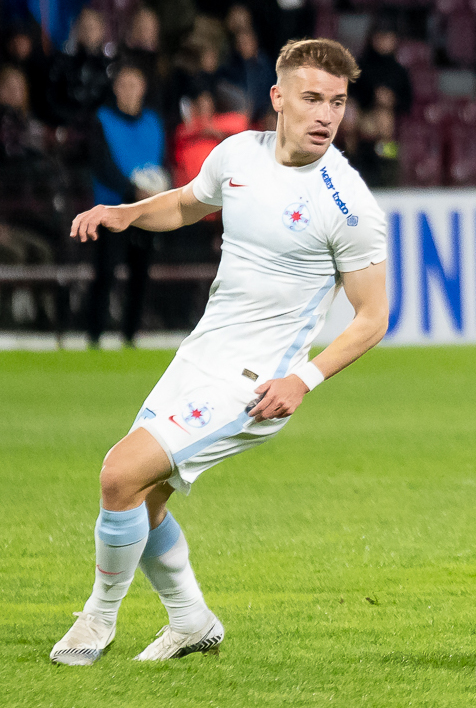
Darius Olaru won the Player of the Month award a record three times.

=== Player of the Month ===
Year	Month	Player	Nationality	Pos.	Team	Ref
2021	August	Cristian Săpunaru	Romania	DF	Rapid București	
2021	September	Jefté Betancor	Spain	FW	Farul Constanța	
2021	October	Andrei Ivan	Romania	FW	Universitatea Craiova	
2021	November	Alexandru Cicâldău	Romania	MF	(Turkey) Galatasaray	
2021	December	Gabriel Tamaș	Romania	DF	Voluntari	
2022	February	Gustavo Vagenin	Brazil	FW	Universitatea Craiova	
2022	March	Octavian Popescu	Romania	FW	FCSB	
2022	April	Darius Olaru	Romania	MF	FCSB	
2022	May	Marius Ștefănescu	Romania	FW	Sepsi OSK	
2022	July	Marius Ștefănescu (2)	Romania	FW	Sepsi OSK	
2022	August	Andrea Compagno	Italy	FW	FC U Craiova / FCSB	
2022	September	Baba Alhassan	Ghana	MF	Hermannstadt	
2022	October	Doru Popadiuc	Romania	MF	Chindia Târgoviște	
2023	February	Malcom Edjouma	France	MF	FCSB	
2023	March	Adrian Mazilu	Romania	FW	Farul Constanța	
2023	April	Florinel Coman	Romania	FW	FCSB	
2023	May	Tudor Băluță	Romania	MF	Farul Constanța	
2023	July	Florinel Coman (2)	Romania	FW	FCSB	
2023	August	Aurelian Chițu	Romania	FW	FC U Craiova	
2023	September	Darius Olaru (2)	Romania	MF	FCSB	
2023	October	Dan Nistor	Romania	MF	Universitatea Cluj	
2023	November	Horațiu Moldovan	Romania	GK	Rapid București	
2023	December	Darius Olaru (3)	Romania	MF	FCSB	
2024	February	Albion Rrahmani	Kosovo	FW	Rapid București	
2024	March	Alexandru Mitriță	Romania	FW	Universitatea Craiova	
2024	April	Florinel Coman (3)	Romania	FW	FCSB	
2024	May	Dennis Politic	Romania	FW	Dinamo Bucuresti	
2024	July	Catalin Cirjan	Romania	MF	Dinamo Bucuresti	
2024	August	Astrit Selmani	Kosovo	FW	Dinamo Bucuresti	
2024	September	Darius Olaru (4)	Romania	MF	FCSB	
2024	October	Daniel Birligea	Romania	FW	FCSB	
2024	November	Daniel Birligea (2)	Romania	FW	FCSB	
2024	December	Darius Olaru (5)	Romania	MF	FCSB	
2025	February	Risto Radunovic	Montenegro	DF	FCSB	
2025	March	Alexandru Mitrita (2)	Romania	FW	Universitatea Craiova	
2025	April	Juri Cisotti	Italy	MF	FCSB	
2025	May	Daniel Birligea (3)	Romania	FW	FCSB	
2025	August	Steven Nsimba	France	FW	Universitatea Craiova	
2025	September	Caio Ferreira	Brazil	FW	Arges Pitesti	
2025	October	Alexandru Dobre	Romania	FW	Rapid Bucuresti	
2025	November	Claudiu Petrila	Romania	FW	Rapid Bucuresti	
2025	December	Nuno Pedro	Portugal	MF	Oțelul Galați	
2026	January	Andrei Cordea	Romania	FW	CFR Cluj	
2026	February	Lorenzo Biliboc	Romania	FW	CFR Cluj	
2026	March	Issouf Macalou	Ivory Coast	FW	Universitatea Cluj	
2026	April	Catalin Cirjan (2)	Romania	MF	Dinamo Bucuresti	
2026	May	Laurențiu Popescu	Romania	GK	Universitatea Craiova	
2026	August	Daniel Armstrong	Scotland	FW	Dinamo Bucuresti	
2026	September	Martín Pascual	Spain	DF	Dinamo Bucuresti	
2026	October	Dean Zandbergen	Netherlands	FW	Dinamo Bucuresti	

=== Manager of the Month ===
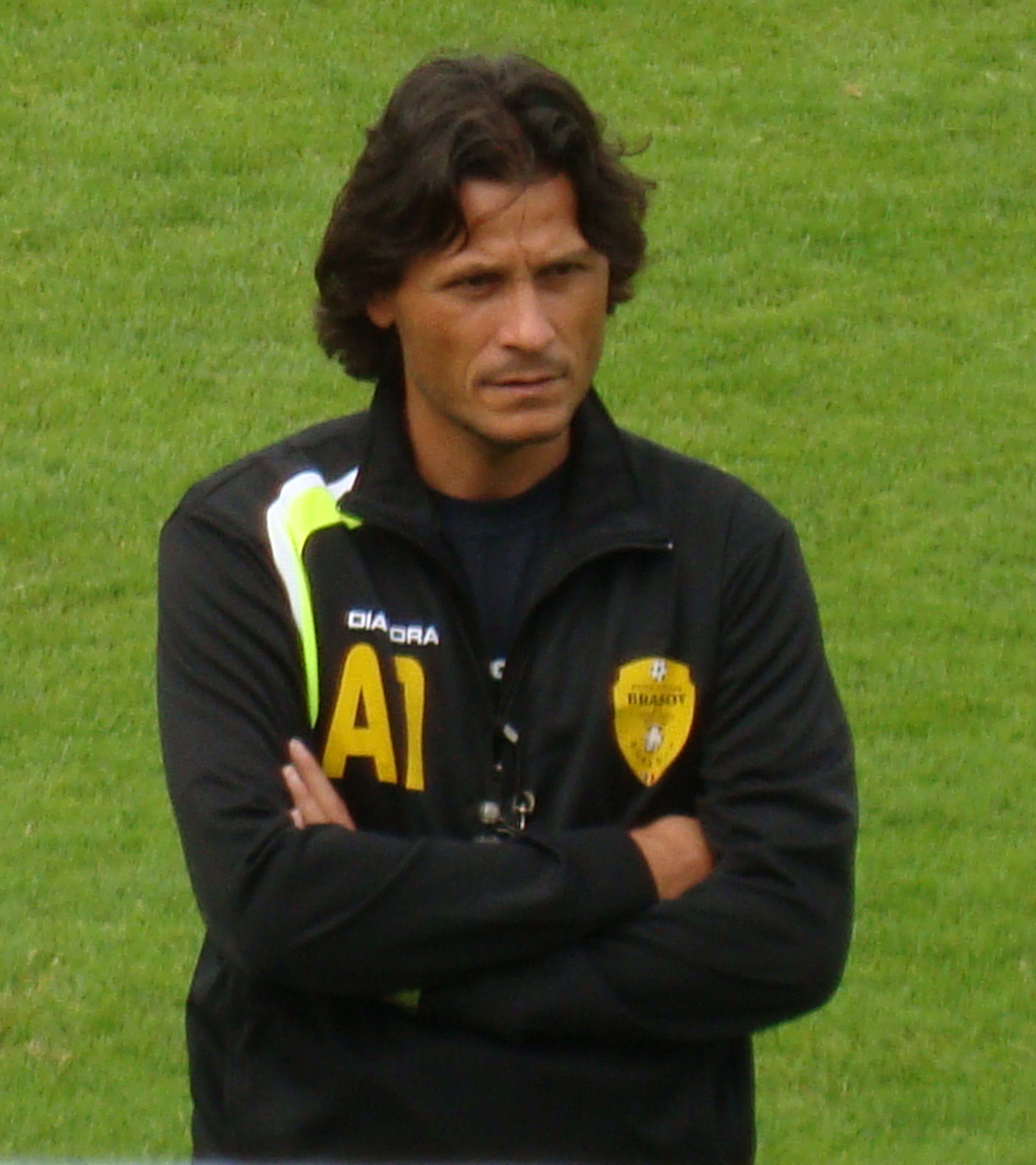
Nicolò Napoli was the first foreigner to win the Manager of the Month award.

Year	Month	Manager	Nationality	Team	Ref
2021	August	Mihai Iosif	Romania	Rapid București	
2021	September	Liviu Ciobotariu	Romania	Voluntari	
2021	October	Laurențiu Reghecampf	Romania	Universitatea Craiova	
2021	November	Andrei Prepeliță	Romania	Argeș Pitești	
2021	December	Dan Petrescu	Romania	CFR Cluj	
2022	February	Nicolò Napoli	Italy	FC U Craiova	
2022	March	Răzvan Lucescu	Romania	(Greece) PAOK	
2022	April	Adrian Mutu	Romania	Rapid București	
2022	May	Cristiano Bergodi	Italy	Sepsi OSK	
2022	July	Cristiano Bergodi (2)	Italy	Sepsi OSK	
2022	August	Gheorghe Hagi	Romania	Farul Constanța	
2022	September	Marius Măldărășanu	Romania	Hermannstadt	
2022	October	Gheorghe Hagi (2)	Romania	Farul Constanța	
2023	February	Gheorghe Hagi (3)	Romania	Farul Constanța	
2023	March	Dan Petrescu (2)	Romania	CFR Cluj	
2023	April	Gheorghe Hagi (4)	Romania	Farul Constanța	
2023	May	Gheorghe Hagi (5)	Romania	Farul Constanța	
2023	July	Liviu Ciobotariu (2)	Romania	Sepsi OSK	
2023	August	Liviu Ciobotariu (3)	Romania	Sepsi OSK	
2023	September	Dorinel Munteanu	Romania	Oțelul Galați	
2023	October	Ioan Ovidiu Sabău	Romania	Universitatea Cluj	
2023	November	Edward Iordănescu	Romania	Romania national team	
2023	December	Răzvan Lucescu (2)	Romania	(Greece) PAOK	
2024	February	Cristiano Bergodi (3)	Italy	Rapid București	
2024	March	Ivaylo Petev	Bulgaria	Universitatea Craiova	
2024	April	Elias Charalambous	Cyprus	FCSB	
2024	May	Răzvan Lucescu (3)	Romania	(Greece) PAOK	
2024	July	Adrian Mihalcea	Romania	Unirea Slobozia	
2024	August	Zeljko Kopic	Croatia	Dinamo Bucuresti	
2024	September	Ioan Ovidiu Sabău (2)	Romania	Universitatea Cluj	
2024	October	Daniel Pancu	Romania	Romania U-21	
2024	November	Elias Charalambous (2)	Cyprus	FCSB	
2024	December	Zeljko Kopic (2)	Croatia	Dinamo Bucuresti	
2025	February	Elias Charalambous (3)	Cyprus	FCSB	
2025	March	Mirel Radoi	Romania	Universitatea Craiova	
2025	April	Elias Charalambous (4)	Cyprus	FCSB	
2025	May	Elias Charalambous (5)	Cyprus	FCSB	
2025	August	Mirel Radoi (2)	Romania	Universitatea Craiova	
2025	September	Bogdan Andone	Romania	Arges Pitesti	
2025	October	Leo Grozavu	Romania	Botosani	
2025	October	Constantin Galca	Romania	Rapid Bucuresti	
2025	November	Constantin Galca (2)	Romania	Rapid Bucuresti	
2025	December	Laszlo Balint	Romania	Oțelul Galați	
2026	January	Daniel Pancu (2)	Romania	CFR Cluj	
2026	February	Daniel Pancu (3)	Romania	CFR Cluj	
2026	March	Cristiano Bergodi (4)	Italy	Universitatea Cluj	
2026	April	Zeljko Kopic (3)	Croatia	Dinamo Bucuresti	
2026	May	Filipe Coelho	Portugal	Universitatea Craiova	
2026	August	Nuno Campos	Portugal	Dinamo Bucuresti	
2026	September	Daniel Pancu (4)	Romania	Rapid Bucuresti	
2026	October	Nuno Campos (2)	Portugal	Dinamo Bucuresti	

== Multiple winners ==
As of October 2026 award

=== Player of the Month ===
Rank	Players	Wins
1	Darius Olaru	5
2	Florinel Coman	3
2	Daniel Birligea	3
4	Marius Ștefănescu	2
4	Alexandru Mitrita	2
4	Cătălin Cîrjan	2
7	37 players	1

=== Manager of the Month ===
Rank	Managers	Wins
1	Gheorghe Hagi	5
1	(Cyprus) Elias Charalambous	5
3	(Italy) Cristiano Bergodi	4
3	Daniel Pancu	4
5	Liviu Ciobotariu	3
5	Răzvan Lucescu	3
5	(Croatia) Zeljko Kopic	3
8	Dan Petrescu	2
8	Ioan Ovidiu Sabau	2
8	Mirel Radoi	2
8	Constantin Galca	2
8	(Portugal) Nuno Campos	2
13	24 coaches	1

== Awards won by position ==
As of October 2026 award

Position	Players	Wins
Forward	23	29
Midfielder	10	15
Defender	4	4
Goalkeeper	2	2

== Awards won by nationality ==
As of October 2026 award

=== Player of the Month ===
Nationality	Players	Wins
Romania	23	34
Kosovo	2	2
Italy	2	2
France	2	2
Brazil	2	2
Spain	2	2
Ghana	1	1
Montenegro	1	1
Portugal	1	1
Ivory Coast	1	1
Scotland	1	1
Netherlands	1	1

=== Manager of the Month ===
Nationality	Managers	Wins
Romania	19	34
Cyprus	1	5
Italy	2	5
Croatia	1	3
Portugal	2	3
Bulgaria	1	1

== Awards won by club ==
As of October 2026 award

=== Player of the Month ===
Club	Players	Wins
FCSB	8	16 (Note: Andrea Compagno played for both FC U Craiova and FCSB when he won the award in August 2022.)
Dinamo Bucuresti	6	7
Universitatea Craiova	5	6
Rapid București	5	5
Farul Constanța	3	3
Sepsi OSK	1	2
FC U Craiova	2	2
Universitatea Cluj	2	2
6 teams	1	1

=== Manager of the Month ===
Club	Managers	Wins
Rapid București	5	6
Farul Constanța	1	5
FCSB	1	5
Dinamo Bucuresti	2	5
Universitatea Craiova	3	5
Sepsi OSK	1	4
CFR Cluj	2	4
(Greece) PAOK	1	3
Universitatea Cluj	2	3
Arges Pitesti	2	2
Oțelul Galați	2	2
7 teams	1	1

== See also ==
- Gazeta Sporturilor Romanian Footballer of the Year
- Gazeta Sporturilor Foreign Player of the Year in Romania
- Gazeta Sporturilor Romania Coach of the Year
