= Vlad Chiricheș =

Romanian footballer (born 1989)

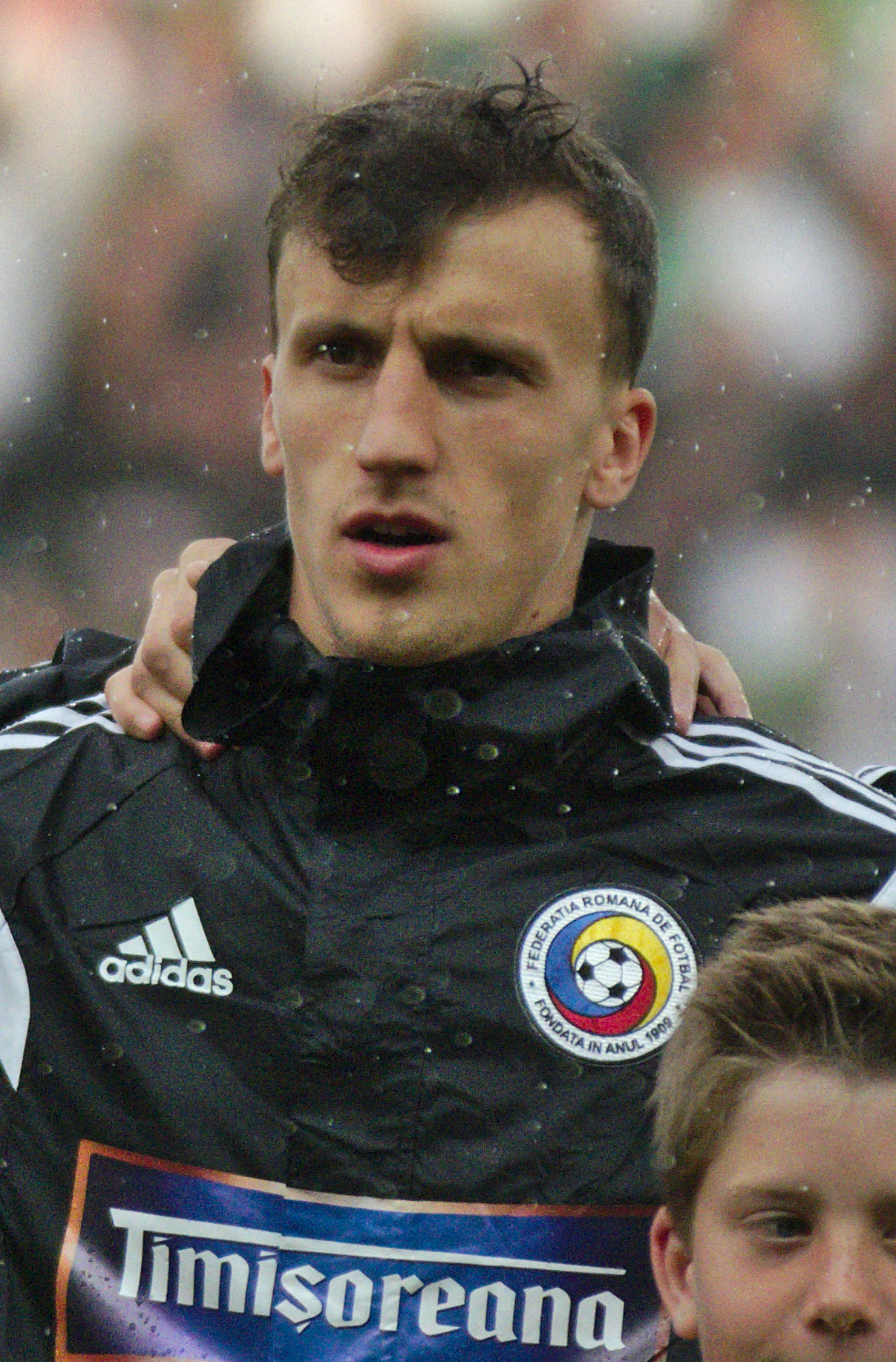
- Chiricheș with Romania in 2014

Personal information
- Full name: Vlad Iulian Chiricheș
- Date of birth: 14 November 1989 (age 37)
- Place of birth: Bacău, Romania
- Height: 1.84 m (6 ft 0 in)
- Positions: Defender; defensive midfielder

Team information
- Current team: Romania U19 (assistant)

Youth career
- –2004: LPS Bacău
- 2004–2007: Ardealul Cluj
- 2007–2008: Benfica

Senior career*
Years	Team	Apps	(Gls)
2008–2010	Internațional Curtea de Argeș	41	(1)
2010–2011	Pandurii Târgu Jiu	39	(0)
2012–2013	Steaua București	42	(1)
2013–2015	Tottenham Hotspur	27	(1)
2015–2020	Napoli	32	(3)
2019–2020	→ Sassuolo (loan)	9	(0)
2020–2022	Sassuolo	53	(2)
2022–2023	Cremonese	16	(0)
2023–2026	FCSB	48	(1)
Total		307	(9)

International career
2009–2010	Romania U21	4	(0)
2011–2025	Romania	78	(0)

Managerial career
- 2026–: Romania U19 (assistant)
- * Club domestic league appearances and goals

Vlad Iulian Chiricheș (Romanian pronunciation: [ˈvlad ˈkirikeʃ]; born 14 November 1989) is a Romanian former professional footballer, currently assistant coach at the Romania national under-19 team. During his playing career, he played primarily as a centre-back, but also he was deployed as a right-back or a defensive midfielder.

Chiricheș spent the first part of his senior career in Romania with Internațional Curtea de Argeș, Pandurii Târgu Jiu, and Steaua București. He helped the latter to a Liga I title and a Supercupa României, before transferring to Tottenham Hotspur in 2013 in a then Romanian record sale of €9.5 million (£8.5 million). Chiricheș relocated to Italy after two years in the Premier League, representing Serie A clubs Napoli, Sassuolo, and Cremonese over the course of eight seasons. In 2023, he returned to Romania by re-signing for FCSB.

A full international for Romania since September 2011, Chiricheș has earned over 70 caps for his country and represented it in the UEFA Euro 2016.

== Club career ==
=== Early career ===
Chiricheș began his youth career in his hometown as a midfielder at LPS Bacău, and even played as a striker a few years later when he moved to Ardealul Cluj. At the latter side, he was teammates with also future Romanian internationals Mihai Răduț and Alexandru Maxim. In 2007, Chiricheș moved to Portuguese team Benfica.

Upon his return to Romania after twelve months spent in Lisbon, Chiricheș joined lower league club Internațional Curtea de Argeș and helped them achieve promotion to the top flight in 2009. In 2010, shortly after Internațional was dissolved, he moved alongside many of his teammates to Pandurii Târgu Jiu. Chiricheș was close to sign for FCSB instead, but their coach Victor Pițurcă did not agree with the transfer.

=== Steaua București ===
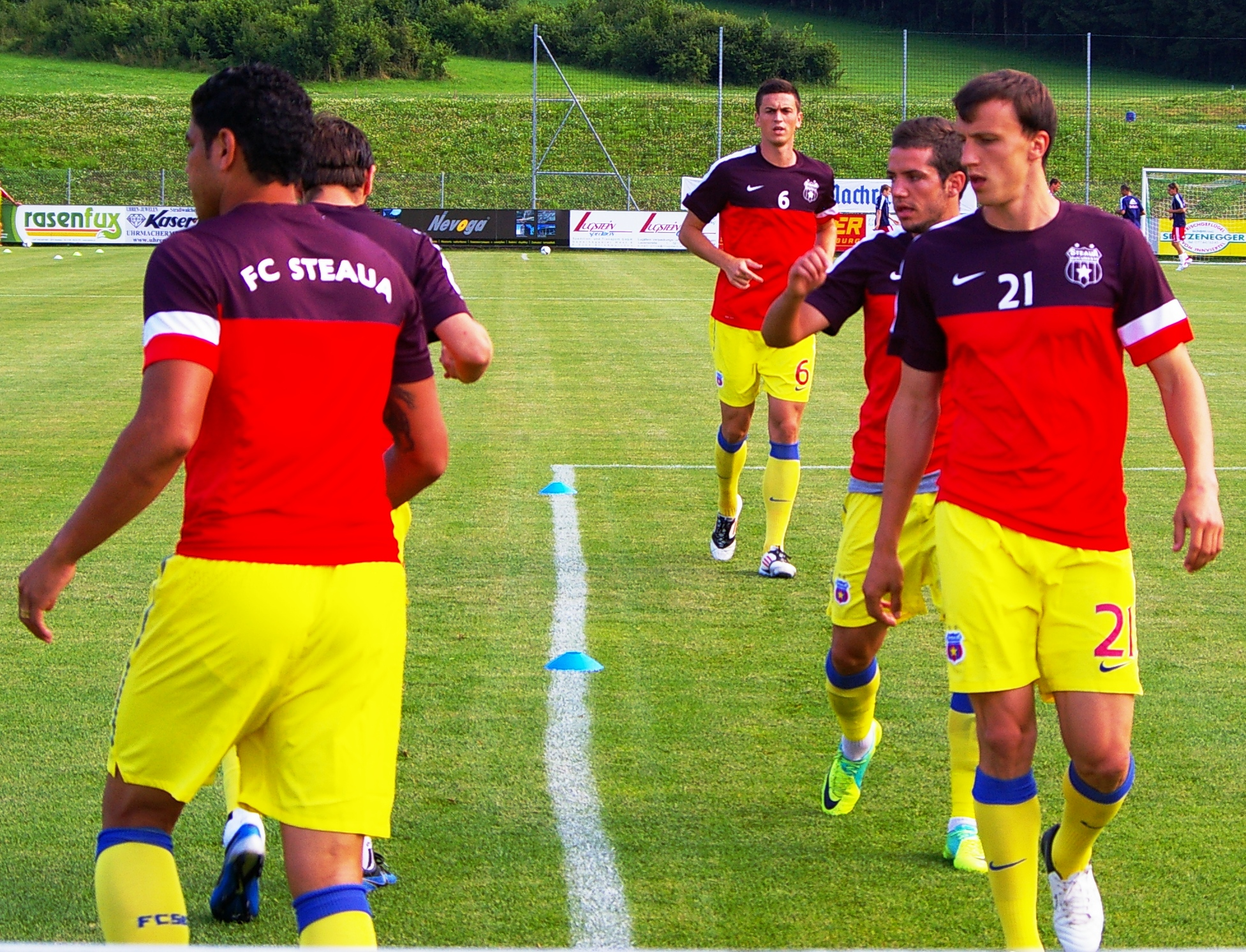
Chiricheș (right) during a Steaua training session in 2012

After one season in Târgu Jiu, Chiricheș eventually sealed a transfer to Steaua București for a reported sum of €700,000 plus 25% interest. FCSB paid €500,000 for the remaining procents of the co-ownership in August 2013, making the total transfer sum to €1.2 million.

On 25 October 2012, he scored an overhead volley from near the penalty spot in a 2–0 win against Molde in the Europa League, which put Steaua in control of Group E. Chiricheș scored from long range against Ajax on 21 February 2013, canceling out a two-goal first-leg deficit as Steaua triumphed in the penalty shoot-out to set up a round of 16 meeting with 2012 Champions League winners Chelsea. He scored again away, an equalising goal to make it 1–1 with a fine close-range finish on the stroke of half-time in the 3–1 second leg loss against "the Blues" at Stamford Bridge after FCSB won the first leg 1–0.

=== Tottenham Hotspur ===
On 30 August 2013, English team Tottenham Hotspur paid €9.5 million (£8.5 million) for the signing of Chiricheș, making him the record transfer of the Romanian championship at the time. On 24 September, he made his competitive debut in a 4–0 League Cup victory over Aston Villa. He registered his Premier League debut against the same opponent, with fans voting him Man of the Match in the 2–0 away win on 20 October. On 4 December that year, Chiricheș scored his first goal by equalising from outside the penalty box in a 2–1 victory over Fulham.

Towards the end of the 2015 winter transfer window, Italian side Roma offered €500,000 to take Chiricheș on a six-month loan, which was deemed too low and rejected by Tottenham. On 9 May 2015, he was sent off for two bookings as his team lost 0–3 to Stoke City at the Britannia Stadium.

=== Napoli ===
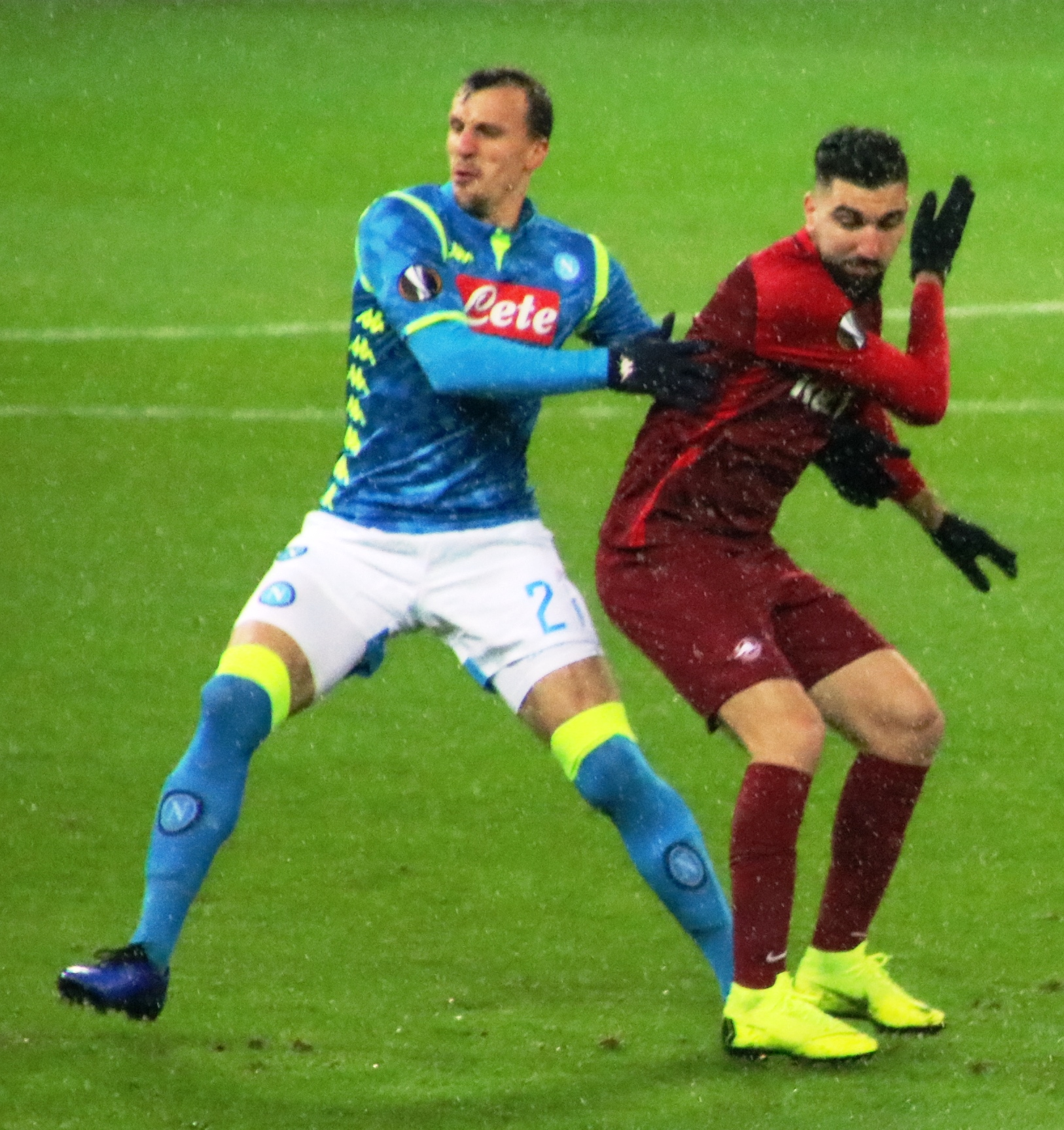
Chiricheș (left) playing against Red Bull Salzburg in the Europa League round of 16, 14 March 2019

On 30 July 2015, Italian club Napoli signed Chiricheș on a four-year deal for a £4.5 million transfer fee. He made his Serie A debut for the club in a 1–2 home loss to Sassuolo on 23 August.

On 10 September 2018, Chiricheș suffered a damage to his anterior cruciate ligament which sidelined him for most of the season.

=== Sassuolo ===
On 2 September 2019, Chiricheș moved to fellow Serie A club Sassuolo on a one-season loan with an obligation to buy. In the summer of 2020, Sassuolo paid the previously-agreed €11 million fee to Napoli.

=== Cremonese ===
On 8 July 2022, Chiricheș chose to stay in Italy and its Serie A by signing a one-year deal with Cremonese.

=== Return to FCSB ===
FCSB announced the return of Chiricheș on 25 July 2023, roughly ten years after his record sale to Tottenham Hotspur. He made his debut four days later by starting in a 2–0 away league win over Oțelul Galați. Chiricheș only played a further six matches—of which three in the Europa Conference League qualifiers—before suffering a long-term injury which kept him out of action until March 2024.

== International career ==
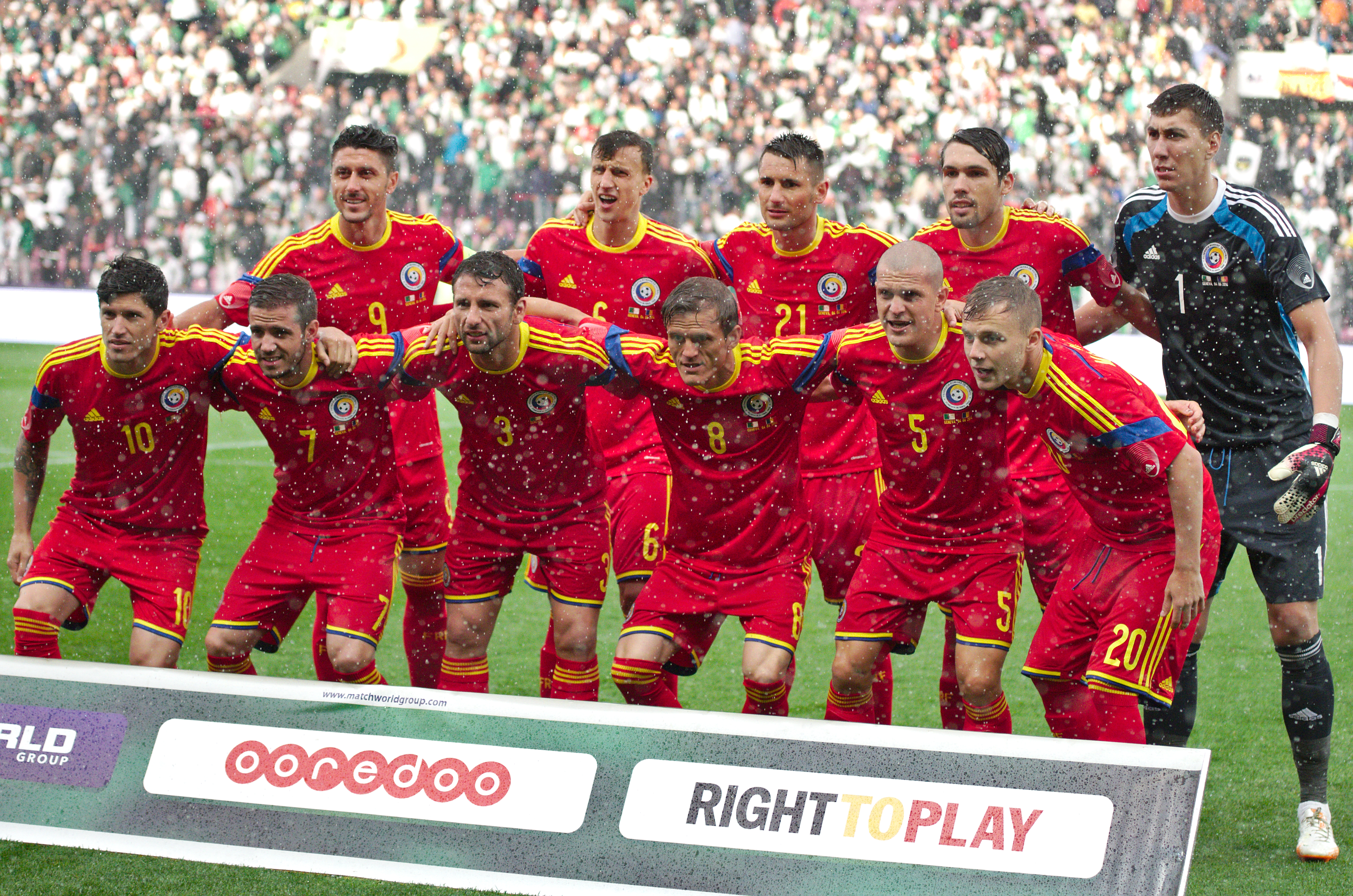
Chiricheș (back row, second from left) with Romania in 2014

On 2 September 2011, Chiricheș made his senior debut for Romania in a 2–0 away victory over Luxembourg counting for the UEFA Euro 2012 qualifying. On 14 August 2013, he served as captain for the first time in a 1–1 friendly draw with Slovakia. His competitive debut as captain came on 6 September that year, in a 3–0 FIFA World Cup qualifier victory over Hungary.

On 5 October 2017, Chiricheș reached his 50th cap for the national team in a 3–1 home win against Kazakhstan.

== Career statistics ==
=== Club ===
As of match played 20 April 2026

Appearances and goals by club, season and competition
Club	Season	League			National cup (Note: Includes Cupa României, FA Cup, Coppa Italia)		League cup (Note: Includes EFL Cup)		Europe		Other		Total	
Club	Season	Division	Apps	Goals	Apps	Goals	Apps	Goals	Apps	Goals	Apps	Goals	Apps	Goals
Internațional Curtea de Argeș	2008–09	Liga II	26	1	1	0	—		—		—		27	1
Internațional Curtea de Argeș	2009–10	Liga I	15	0	1	0	—		—		—		16	0
Internațional Curtea de Argeș	Total		41	1	2	0	—		—		—		43	1
Pandurii Târgu Jiu	2010–11	Liga I	24	0	0	0	—		—		—		24	0
Pandurii Târgu Jiu	2011–12	Liga I	15	0	2	0	—		—		—		17	0
Pandurii Târgu Jiu	Total		39	0	2	0	—		—		—		41	0
Steaua București	2011–12	Liga I	14	0	—		—		2 (Note: Appearance(s) in UEFA Europa League)	0	—		16	0
Steaua București	2012–13	Liga I	26	1	0	0	—		13	3	—		39	4
Steaua București	2013–14	Liga I	2	0	—		—		3 (Note: Appearance(s) in UEFA Champions League)	0	1 (Note: Appearance in Supercupa României)	0	6	0
Steaua București	Total		42	1	0	0	—		18	3	1	0	61	4
Tottenham Hotspur	2013–14	Premier League	17	1	1	0	3	0	3	0	—		24	1
Tottenham Hotspur	2014–15	Premier League	10	0	3	1	1	0	5	0	—		19	1
Tottenham Hotspur	Total		27	1	4	1	4	0	8	0	—		43	2
Napoli	2015–16	Serie A	8	1	2	0	—		7	1	—		17	2
Napoli	2016–17	Serie A	14	2	1	0	—		1	0	—		16	2
Napoli	2017–18	Serie A	7	0	1	0	—		1	0	—		9	0
Napoli	2018–19	Serie A	3	0	0	0	—		3	0	—		6	0
Napoli	Total		32	3	4	0	—		12	1	—		48	4
Sassuolo (loan)	2019–20	Serie A	9	0	0	0	—		—		—		9	0
Sassuolo	2020–21	Serie A	24	2	0	0	—		—		—		24	2
Sassuolo	2021–22	Serie A	29	0	0	0	—		—		—		29	0
Sassuolo	Total		62	2	0	0	—		—		—		62	2
Cremonese	2022–23	Serie A	16	0	1	0	—		—		—		17	0
FCSB	2023–24	Liga I	10	0	0	0	—		3 (Note: Appearances in UEFA Europa Conference League)	0	—		13	0
FCSB	2024–25	Liga I	26	1	3	0	—		8 (Note: One appearance in UEFA Champions League, seven appearances in UEFA Europa League)	0	1	0	38	1
FCSB	2025–26	Liga I	12	0	1	0	—		9 (Note: Four appearances in UEFA Champions League, five appearances in UEFA Europa League)	0	1	0	23	0
FCSB	Total		48	1	4	0	—		20	0	2	0	74	1
Career total			307	9	17	1	4	0	58	4	3	0	389	14

=== International ===
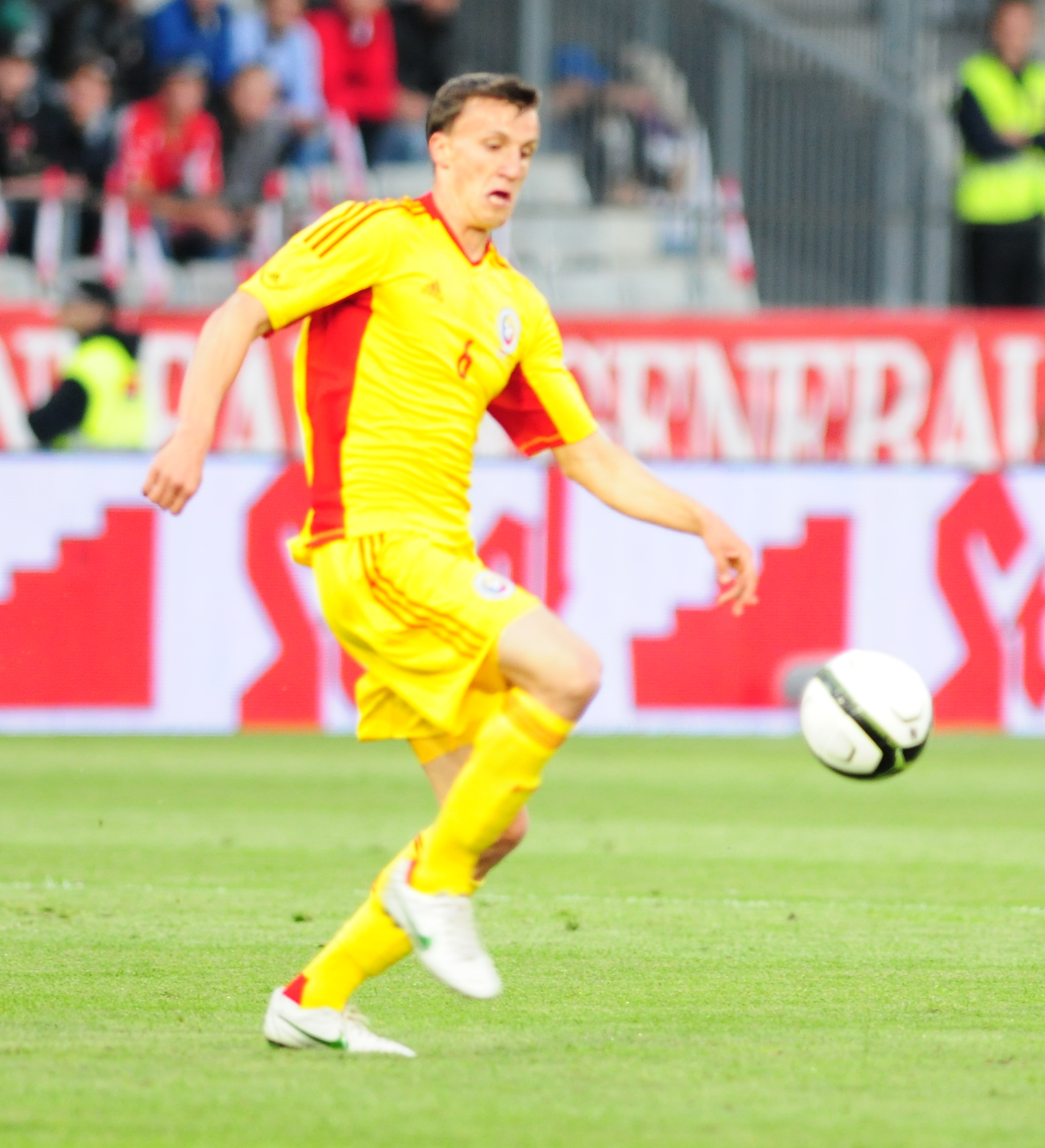
Chiricheș in action against Austria in June 2012

As of match played 10 June 2025

Appearances and goals by national team and year
National team	Year	Apps	Goals
Romania	2011	5	0
Romania	2012	10	0
Romania	2013	8	0
Romania	2014	7	0
Romania	2015	7	0
Romania	2016	8	0
Romania	2017	9	0
Romania	2018	1	0
Romania	2019	3	0
Romania	2020	2	0
Romania	2021	10	0
Romania	2022	6	0
Romania	2025	2	0
Total		78	0

== Honours ==
FCSB

- Liga I: 2012–13, 2013–14, 2023–24, 2024–25
- Supercupa României: 2013, 2024, 2025

Tottenham Hotspur

- League Cup runner-up: 2014–15

Individual

- Gazeta Sporturilor Romanian Footballer of the Year: 2013; runner-up: 2012
