= Isabel Coman =

British civil engineer

- Born: 1973 (age 52–53)
- Education: University of Leeds
- Employer(s): Costain Group; Transport for London

Isabel Coman is a British civil engineer who is Director of Engineering and Asset Strategy, Transport for London. She previously worked at Costain Group, where she was responsible for the Bond Street and Paddington station upgrade works ahead of the Elizabeth line. She was elected a Fellow of the Royal Academy of Engineering in 2025.

== Early life and education ==
Coman was born in London. Her father was a solicitor and her mother worked for the British Library. She studied civil engineering at the University of Leeds. At the time, only 15% of her course were women. After graduating, she worked for Balfour Beatty as a site engineer for the A1/M1 link road project. She completed a design placement at Arup Group, where she specialised in geotechnical engineering.

== Research and career ==
Coman worked for Costain Group on High Speed 1. She worked on Crossrail, and in particular a tunnelling bid that linked London Paddington and Farringdon. Together with Skanska, Coman successfully bid for the first stage of upgrade works at Bond Street station. She directed the station upgrade, which was delayed because of changes in the approach to Bond Street. The project had various design stages, and was complicated by the streets of Mayfair above, where residents and business owners had complex opinions. Bond Street station was completed in 2012, and Coman went on maternity leave.

Coman eventually moved to Paddington station, where she was responsible for the central covered section. This involve an elaborate sequence of work, including installing power supplies, redesigning the roof and managing dynamic supply chains. They used sound waves to test piles of concrete and minimise any potential vibrations. Coman does not believe digital railway works will have much impact on construction, and strives to balance architectural and environmental requirements with engineering demands.

Coman was appointed to a venture board for Costain in 2016, where she was made responsible for the full Crossrail programme, and eventually for High Speed 2. Coman became Head of Estates and Capital Projects at the Palace of Westminster. Coman was appointed Director of Engineering and Asset Strategy at Transport for London.

Coman was elected Fellow of the Institution of Civil Engineers in 2010 and Royal Academy of Engineering in 2025.
