= Herbert Coman =

American football player and coach (1920–2009)

Biographical details
- Born: October 20, 1920; Canton, North Carolina
- Died: July 13, 2009 (aged 88); Asheville, North Carolina

Playing career
- 1940–1942: South Carolina

Coaching career (HC unless noted)
- 1947–1950: Asheville-Biltmore

Administrative career (AD unless noted)
- 1947–1952: Asheville-Biltmore

Head coaching record
- Overall: 35–12–1

J. Herbert Coman (October 20, 1920 – July 13, 2009) was an American football player and coach. He served as the head football coach at the University of North Carolina at Asheville (then known as Asheville-Biltmore College) from 1947 to 1950.

Coman played college football at the University of South Carolina, lettering from 1940 to 1942.
