= Simion Coman =

Romanian general

Simion Coman (22 May 1890 – 15 April 1971) was a Romanian brigadier general during World War II.

He advanced in rank to lieutenant colonel in 1932, and to colonel in 1937. From 1938 to 1940, Coman served as Prefect of Satu Mare County.

In June 1941, he was appointed Commanding Officer 3rd Dorobanți Infantry Regiment. In January 1942, he became Deputy General Officer Commanding 2nd Mountain Division (Vânători de munte), under the command of General Ioan Dumitrache. The division left for the front on 6 July, at the start of the Battle of the Caucasus. In October of that year Coman fought with the division at the battle of Nalchik, in the foothills of the Caucasus Mountains. The front was broken between the Soviet 295th Rifle and 2nd Guards Rifle Divisions; on 28 October, after fierce fighting in the hills and forests near Nalchik, the 2nd Mountain Division took its objective. The Battle of Nalchik ended as one of the biggest Romanian victories on the Eastern Front, with the capture of 3,079 prisoners and a large amount of weaponry and war materiel; during the engagement, the 2nd Mountain Division lost 820 soldiers (157 dead, 647 wounded, and 16 missing). In the aftermath, the division moved its headquarters to Nalchik, with Coman as commander of the garrison.

In March 1943, he was promoted to brigadier general and named Commanding 5th Instruction Center. In June 1943 he was awarded the Order of Michael the Brave, 3rd class. From June to October 1944, Coman served as General Officer Commanding 21st Training Division, and from October to December of that year he was Commanding Officer 3rd Frontier Brigade, From December 1944 to September 1945, he was Deputy General Officer Commanding 4th Corps Area. He was sent into reserve in 1946 and retired in 1947.
