= Driving licence in Ukraine =

Driving licence in Ukraine; Водійське посвідчення
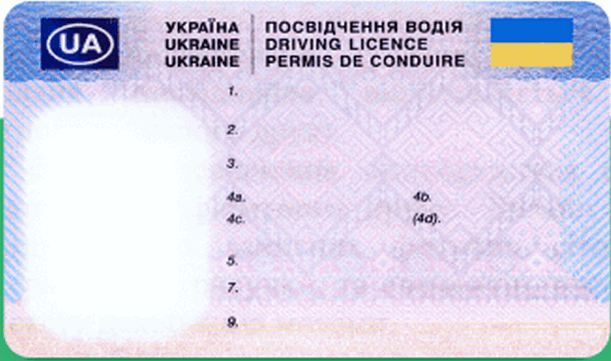
- The front of a Ukrainian driving licence issued since 2021.
- Type: Driving licence
- Issued by: Ukraine
- Purpose: Authorisation

Ukrainian driving licences (Ukrainian: Водійське посвідчення or officially посвідчення водія на право керування транспортним засобом відповідної категорії) are the official documents which authorize their respective holders to operate various types of motor vehicle on public roads.

In 2016, a new design was introduced featuring a blue background color.

In February 2020, following the launch of Diia, the Ukrainian government launched in-app digital driving licences. Since then, Ukraine became the fourth country in Europe to have digital driver's licences. In February 2021, Verkhovna Rada equated digital driver's licences in Diia with paper analogues.

In 2022, a Regulation is adopted by the European Parliament and the council. It established the recognition of Ukrainian driving licences in the European Union when the holder enjoys temporary protection.

The Ukrainian driver's licenee process, particularly for Class B (passenger cars), involves a series of steps and training requirements, although it differs from the Graduated Driver Licensing (GDL) system found in Canadian provinces like Alberta.

In Ukraine, the process for obtaining a driver's licenee includes both theoretical and practical training at a driving school, followed by exams at a service centre of the Ministry of Internal Affairs. As of 2023, the Ukrainian system underwent some changes. Previously, future drivers completed both theory and practical training at a driving school before taking internal exams and then theoretical and practical exams at a service centre. The new system changes this sequence:

Theoretical Training: This is conducted in a driving school. Theory Exam: Taken at a service centre of the Ministry of Internal Affairs. Practical Training: Conducted at a driving school following the theory exam. Internal Driving Test: This is followed by a driving test at the service centre. The Model Driver Training Curriculum in Ukraine mandates 64 academic hours for theory and 40 hours for practice. The entire training at a driving school, including both theory and practical, lasts at least ten weeks (2.5 months), provided the theory exam is passed on the first attempt.
