= Comana =

Comana may refer to:

== Places ==
=== Turkey ===
- Comana (Cappadocia), an ancient city in Turkey
- Comana Pontica, an ancient city of Pontus in Turkey

=== Romania ===
- Comăna, a commune in Brașov County, Romania (including the villages of Comăna de Jos and Comăna de Sus)
- Comana, Constanța, a commune in Constanţa County, Romania
- Comana, Giurgiu, a commune in Giurgiu County, Romania
- Comana, a tributary of the Ialomița in Ialomița County, Romania
- Comana (Olt), a tributary of the Olt in Brașov County, Romania

== Other ==
- Comana (moth), a moth genus in the family Limacodidae

== See also ==
- Commana
- Coman (disambiguation)
- Comanca (disambiguation)
- Comănești (disambiguation)
- Komana, a village in the North-West District of Botswana
