= Zelina Brunschwig =

American interior and fabric designer

Zelina Comegys Brunschwig (died September 10, 1981) was an interior and fabric designer.

== Early life ==
Zelina Comegys Brunschwig was born in Rock Island, Illinois, the daughter of Thomas Parsons Comegys and Eliza Virginia Thompson Comegys. She graduated from Rock Island High School in 1914, and taught kindergarten to support her younger sisters for 14 years before attending Parsons School of Design to study interior design. After her graduation, she began work at McMillen Inc. In 1929. She married Colonel Roger E. Brunschwig and joined his textile firm, Brunschwig & Fils Inc., as a stylist in 1941.

== Career ==
Brunschwig & Fils was established in 1891 by Achille Brunschwig as a tapestry-weaving mill in Aubusson and Bohain, France. During World War II, as her husband joined the Free French forces and was one of the founders of France Forever, Brunschwig took the lead of the company as the director of design and later as vice president. Determined to have the company's collection survive, she worked with American mills to substitute parachute cloth for silk and unbleached muslin for linen to weave and print designs without French imports. Under Brunschwig's leadership, the company expanded to offer wallcoverings and trimmings after the war.

In 1946, Brunschwig worked with the Museum of Modern Art to create the first printed textiles competition and exhibition. The winner of the competition would see their designs in 19 stores nationwide and win $1,000, furnished by Brunschwig. It generated huge interest and 2,443 designs were submitted. The first prize winner was Yvonne Delattre.

In 1951, she was awarded the Legion of Honor by the French Government for her contributions to the people of France during and after the war.

Throughout her work, she emphasized the importance of history in working with period toiles, damasks and brocades in modern home décor.

She died in September 1981, at the age of 84, in New York City. Her sister Celeste Comegys Peardon wrote children's books for classroom use.
