= Celeste Comegys Peardon =

American writer

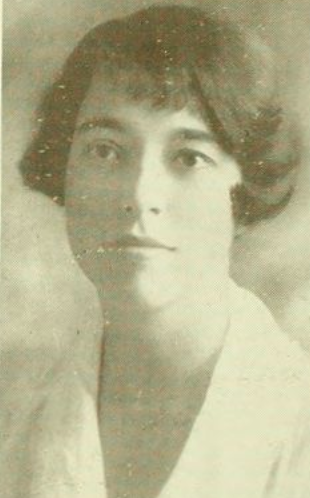
- Celeste Comegys, from the 1926 yearbook of Barnard College
- Born: Mary Celeste Comegys; March 25, 1898; Rock Island, Illinois
- Died: December 29, 1988 (age 90 years); Bridgewater, Connecticut
- Occupation: Writer
- Relatives: Zelina Brunschwig (sister)

Mary Celeste Comegys Peardon (March 25, 1898 – December 29, 1988) was an American writer of books for children and classroom use.

== Early life ==
Mary Celeste Comegys was born in Rock Island, Illinois, the daughter of Joseph Parsons Comegys (not the congressman of the same name) and Eliza (or Elsie) Virginia Thompson Comegys. Her father was a surgeon and a college professor. She graduated from Rock Island High School, and graduated from Barnard College in 1926. Her older sister Zelina Comegys Brunschwig was prominent in the interior design industry.

== Career ==
Peardon wrote books for children, especially The Work-Play Readers, for classroom use. She was also credited as a consultant on the short film Adventures of Bunny Rabbit (1937). She worked on another film produced by Encyclopedia Britannica, Navajo Children, with her colleagues Arthur I. Gates and Ernest Horn. She was president of the Women's Faculty Club at Teachers College, Columbia University, and spoke at educational meetings.

== Publications ==
Many of these titles were part of The Work-Play Readers, a set of primers for early readers, which she wrote in collaboration with Arthur I. Gates and other contributors.

- Adventures in a Big City (1931)
- "Studies of Children's Interest in Reading" (1931, with Arthur I. Gates and Ina Craig Sartorius)
- Nick and Dick; Fun with Nick and Dick; and The Story Book of Nick and Dick (1936 and 1937, with Arthur I. Gates and Franklin T. Baker)
- Jim and Judy (1939, with Arthur I. Gates and Miriam Blanton Huber)
- Off we go (1939, with Arthur I. Gates and Miriam Blanton Huber)
- Wide wings (1939, with Arthur I. Gates and Miriam Blanton Huber)
- We Grow Up (1939, with Arthur I. Gates and Miriam Blanton Huber)
- Down our street (1939, with Arthur I. Gates, Miriam Blanton, Huber, and Cyrus Leroy Baldridge)
- Sing, canary, sing (1939, with Arthur I. Gates, Cyrus Leroy Baldridge, and Allegra Ingleright)
- The Surprise Box (1939, with Arthur I. Gates and others)
- In Came Pinky (1939, with Arthur I. Gates and others)
- Elsie Elephant (1939, with Arthur I. Gates and others)
- Pueblo Indian stories (1940, with Arthur I. Gates and others)
- Fifty Winters Ago (1940, with Arthur I. Gates and Elizabeth D. Neill)
- The Pupil's Own Vocabulary Speller (1944, with Arthur I. Gates, Henry D. Rinsland, and Ina C. Sartorius)
- Tags and Twinkle (1945, with Arthur I. Gates, Miriam Blanton Huber, and Frank Seely Salisbury)
- Good Times Together (1953, with Arthur I. Gates)
- Robin fly south! (1953, with Arthur I. Gates and Charles Payzant)
- Sandy in the Green Mountains (1957, with Arthur I. Gates and others)
- The World I Know (1957, with Arthur I. Gates)
- Good Times Tomorrow (1957, with Arthur I. Gates)

== Personal life ==
Comegys married Canadian-born professor and college administrator Thomas Preston Peardon in 1926. They had a son, Thomas Jr. She died in 1988, aged 90 years, in Bridgewater, Connecticut.
