= Coman (disambiguation) =

Coman is a surname.

Coman may also refer to:

== Given name ==
- Coman Goggins, former Dublin footballer
- Coman mac Faelchon, (fl. 550) founder, abbot and bishop of Roscommon
- Coman of Kinvara, medieval Irish saint

== Other ==
- Mount Coman, prominent isolated mountain west of the Playfair Mountains in Antarctica
- Coman, a village in Sănduleni Commune, Bacău County, Romania
- Coman tie break, an alternative USTA tie break in Tennis (see Tennis score)

== See also ==
- Comana (disambiguation)
