= 2020–21 CFR Cluj season =

CFR Cluj
2020–21 season
- Chairman: Marian Băgăcean
- Manager: Dan Petrescu (until 30 November 2020); Marius Bilașco (interim) (until 4 December 2020); Edward Iordănescu (from 4 December 2020)
- Stadium: Dr. Constantin Rădulescu
- Liga I: Champions
- Cupa României: Round of 32
- Supercupa României: Winners
- UEFA Champions League: Second qualifying round
- UEFA Europa League: Group stage
- Top goalscorer: League: Ciprian Deac (13); All: Ciprian Deac (14)
Home colours	Away colours	Third colours

The 2020–21 season is the 50th season in CFR Cluj's history, and the 25th in the top-flight of Romanian football. CFR Cluj is competing in Liga I and the Cupa României, having also competed in the Champions League and UEFA Europa League.

== Players ==
=== First-team squad ===
As of 10 March 2021

Note: Flags indicate national team as defined under FIFA eligibility rules; some limited exceptions apply. Players may hold more than one non-FIFA nationality.

No.	Pos.	Nation	Player
1	GK	ROU	Rareș Murariu
3	DF	ROU	Andrei Burcă
4	DF	ROU	Cristian Manea
5	MF	BRA	Soares
6	MF	POR	Luís Aurélio
7	MF	ROU	Alexandru Păun
8	MF	ISL	Rúnar Már Sigurjónsson
9	FW	FRA	Billel Omrani
10	MF	ROU	Ciprian Deac
11	MF	FRA	Michaël Pereira
12	GK	POL	Grzegorz Sandomierski
13	DF	ROU	Denis Ciobotariu
14	DF	ROU	Iasmin Latovlevici
15	DF	TUN	Syam Ben Youssef
16	DF	BIH	Mateo Sušić

No.	Pos.	Nation	Player
18	FW	ROU	Valentin Costache
22	FW	CRO	Gabriel Debeljuh
27	MF	ROU	Alexandru Chipciu
28	MF	ROU	Ovidiu Hoban
34	GK	ROU	Cristian Bălgrădean
37	MF	ROU	Mihai Bordeianu
45	DF	POR	Camora (Captain)
55	DF	BRA	Paulo Vinícius
87	GK	LTU	Giedrius Arlauskis
92	DF	COD	Mike Cestor
94	MF	ROU	Cătălin Itu
96	DF	ROU	Dodi Joca
98	MF	ROU	Nicolae Carnat
99	FW	VEN	Mario Rondón

=== Transfers ===
==== In ====
No.	Pos.	Nation	Player
21	DF	CIV	Kévin Boli (from (China) Guizhou Hengfeng, previously on loan)
22	FW	CRO	Gabriel Debeljuh (from Hermannstadt)
34	GK	ROU	Cristian Bălgrădean (from FCSB)
33	DF	ROU	Mihai Butean (loan return from Gaz Metan Mediaș)
77	FW	SVK	Jakub Vojtuš (from Academica Clinceni)
4	DF	ROU	Cristian Manea (from (Cyprus) Apollon Limassol, previously on loan)
14	DF	ROU	Iasmin Latovlevici (from (Turkey) Bursaspor)
98	MF	ROU	Nicolae Carnat (from Sepsi Sfântu Gheorghe)
1	GK	ROU	Rareș Murariu (on loan from ASU Politehnica Timișoara)
5	MF	BRA	Soares (from (Portugal) Gil Vicente)
15	DF	TUN	Syam Ben Youssef (from (Turkey) Denizlispor)
21	DF	CRO	Ivica Žunić (from (Kazakhstan) Atyrau)
—	FW	ROU	Sebastian Serediuc (from CS Minaur Baia Mare)
8	MF	ISL	Rúnar Már Sigurjónsson (from (Kazakhstan) Astana)
87	GK	LTU	Giedrius Arlauskis (from (Saudi Arabia) Al-Shabab)

==== Loans in ====
No.	Pos.	Nation	Player
37	MF	ROU	Mihai Bordeianu (from (Saudi Arabia) Al Qadsiah)

==== Out ====
No.	Pos.	Nation	Player
87	GK	LTU	Giedrius Arlauskis (to (Saudi Arabia) Al-Shabab)
1	GK	ESP	Jesús Fernández (to Sepsi Sfântu Gheorghe, previously on loan at (Greece) Panetolikos)
20	FW	ROU	George Țucudean (retired)
90	FW	CIV	Lacina Traoré (to (Turkey) Bandırmaspor)
21	DF	CIV	Kévin Boli (to (Turkey) Samsunspor)
—	DF	GRE	Giannis Kontoes (to (Greece) Panionios, previously on loan at Academica Clinceni)
—	DF	ROU	Andrei Radu (to Dinamo București, previously on loan at Politehnica Iasi)
37	MF	ROU	Mihai Bordeianu (to (Saudi Arabia) Al Qadsiah)
5	MF	MLI	Yacouba Sylla (to (Morocco) Mouloudia)
21	DF	CRO	Ivica Žunić (to Rapid București)
77	FW	SVK	Jakub Vojtuš (to (Hungary) Mezőkövesd)
8	MF	CRO	Damjan Đoković (to (Turkey) Çaykur Rizespor)

==== Loans out ====
No.	Pos.	Nation	Player
31	MF	ROU	Alexandru Ioniță (to Astra Giurgiu)
95	DF	ROU	Rareș Ispas (to ACSF Comuna Recea, previously on loan at FC Politehnica Iași)
97	MF	ROU	Alin Fica (to Rapid București)
17	MF	ROU	Sebastian Mailat (to Voluntari, previously on loan at Universitatea Cluj)
2	DF	ROU	Alex Pașcanu (to (Spain) Ponferradina, previously on loan at Voluntari)
23	FW	ROU	Cătălin Golofca (to Sepsi Sfântu Gheorghe)
91	MF	ROU	Răzvan Andronic (to Academica Clinceni)
33	DF	ROU	Mihai Butean (to Gaz Metan Mediaș)
62	MF	ROU	Claudiu Petrila (to Sepsi Sfântu Gheorghe)
89	GK	ROU	Otto Hindrich (to ASU Politehnica Timișoara)
74	GK	ROU	Ionuț Rus (to Hermannstadt)
97	MF	ROU	Alin Fica (to ACSF Comuna Recea, previously on loan at Rapid București)

==== Overall transfer activity ====
===== Expenditure =====
Summer: ▼€1,050,000

Winter: €0

Total: ▼€1,050,000

===== Income =====
Summer: ▲€1,900,000

Winter: ▲€500,000

Total: ▲€2,400,000

===== Net Totals =====
Summer: ▲€850,000

Winter: ▲€500,000

Total: ▲€1,350,000

== Preseason and friendlies ==
Win Draw Loss

7 January 2021 Friendly	CFR Cluj	1−1	Gaz Metan Mediaș	Cluj-Napoca
15:00 EET (UTC+02)	Pereira 56'	Report	Ciocan 89'	Stadium: Dr. Constantin Rădulescu; Attendance: 0

27 March 2021 Friendly	CFR Cluj	2−1	Gaz Metan Mediaș	Cluj-Napoca
13:00 EEST (UTC+02)	Debeljuh 40'; Deac 62' (pen.)		Larie 23'	Stadium: Dr. Constantin Rădulescu; Attendance: 0

== Competitions ==
Win Draw Loss

=== Overview ===
Competition	First match	Last match	Starting round	Final position	Record							
Competition	First match	Last match	Starting round	Final position	Pld	W	D	L	GF	GA	GD	Win %
Liga I	23 August 2020	25 May 2021	Matchday 1	Winner	40	26	8	6	57	20	+37	65.00
Cupa României	29 November 2020		Round of 32	Round of 32	1	0	0	1	0	1	−1	0.00
Supercupa României	15 April 2021		Final	Winner	1	0	1	0	0	0	+0	0.00
UEFA Champions League	19 August 2020	26 August 2020	First qualifying round	Second qualifying round	2	1	1	0	4	2	+2	50.00
UEFA Europa League	24 September 2020	10 December 2020	Third qualifying round	Group stage	8	3	2	3	8	11	−3	37.50
Total					52	30	12	10	69	34	+35	57.69

Last updated: 25 May 2021
Source: Competitions

=== Liga I ===
The Liga I fixture list was announced in August 2020.

==== Regular season ====
===== Table =====
Pos	Team	Pld	W	D	L	GF	GA	GD	Pts	Qualification
1	FCSB	30	20	5	5	57	22	+35	65	Qualification for the Play-off round
2	CFR Cluj	30	19	7	4	42	15	+27	64	Qualification for the Play-off round
3	Universitatea Craiova	30	16	10	4	33	14	+19	58	Qualification for the Play-off round
4	Sepsi OSK	30	10	15	5	43	31	+12	45	Qualification for the Play-off round
5	Academica Clinceni	30	10	14	6	30	26	+4	44	Qualification for the Play-off round

Source: LPF (in Romanian), Soccerway
Rules for classification: 1) Points; 2) Head-to-head points; 3) Head-to-head goal difference; 4) Head-to-head goals scored; 5) Goal difference; 6) Goals scored; 7) Play-off.

===== Results summary =====
Overall								Home						Away					
Pld	W	D	L	GF	GA	GD	Pts	W	D	L	GF	GA	GD	W	D	L	GF	GA	GD
30	19	7	4	42	15	+27	64	8	5	2	22	7	+15	11	2	2	20	8	+12

Last updated: 11 April 2021.
Source: Liga I

===== Results by round =====
Round	1	2	3	4	5	6	7	8	9	10	11	12	13	14	15	16	17	18	19	20	21	22	23	24	25	26	27	28	29	30
Ground	A	H	H	A	H	A	H	A	H	A	H	A	H	A	H	H	A	A	H	A	H	A	H	A	H	A	H	A	H	A
Result	W	D	W	W	D	D	W	W	L	W	L	W	W	W	D	W	W	W	D	W	W	L	D	W	W	W	W	L	W	D
Position	3	4	4	2	2	3	3	3	3	3	3	3	3	3	3	2	2	2	2	2	2	2	1	1	1	1	1	2	2	2

Updated to match(es) played on 11 April 2021. Source: Liga I
A = Away; H = Home; W = Win; D = Draw; L = Loss

===== Matches =====
Win Draw Loss

23 August 2020 1	Academica Clinceni	1−2	CFR Cluj	Clinceni
18:00 EEST (UTC+03)	Cebotaru 48' (pen.)m; Achim (yellow card) 72'; Ventúra (yellow card) 81'; Jutrić (yellow card) 84'	Report	Costache 15'; Bordeianu (yellow card) 35'; Boli (yellow card) 43'; Cestor (yellow card) 51'; Petrila 74'; Debeljuh (yellow card) 86'	Stadium: Clinceni; Attendance: 0 Referee: Cătălin Popa (Pitești)

29 August 2020 2	CFR Cluj	0−0	Sepsi Sfântu Gheorghe	Cluj-Napoca
21:00 EEST (UTC+03)	Deac (penalty missed) 57'; Itu (yellow card) 66'	Report	Fofana (yellow card) 87'; Mitrea (yellow card) 90+1'	Stadium: Dr. Constantin Rădulescu; Attendance: 0 Referee: Adrian Cojocaru (Galați)

13 September 2020 3	CFR Cluj	1−0	Hermannstadt	Cluj-Napoca
21:00 EEST (UTC+03)	Vinícius 66'	Report	Viera (yellow card) 7'; Sîntean (yellow card) 62'; Santos (yellow card) 90+3'	Stadium: Dr. Constantin Rădulescu; Attendance: 0 Referee: Ovidiu Hațegan (Arad)

18 September 2020 4	Astra Giurgiu	0−2	CFR Cluj	Giurgiu
21:00 EEST (UTC+03)	Alibec (yellow card) 31'; Crepulja (yellow card) 35'; Graovac (yellow card) 58'	Report	Crepulja 45' (o.g.); Debeljuh (yellow card) 60', (goal) 61'; Vojtuš (yellow card) 83'	Stadium: Marin Anastasovici; Attendance: 0 Referee: Radu Petrescu (Bucharest)

27 September 2020 5	CFR Cluj	0−0	Chindia Târgoviște	Cluj-Napoca
18:45 EEST (UTC+03)	Petrescu (yellow card) 38'; Pereira (yellow card) 43'; Manea (yellow card) 75'; Păun (yellow card) 90+1'; Omrani (yellow card) 90+3'	Report	Florea (yellow card) 71'; Yaméogo (yellow card) 77'; Dumitrașcu (yellow card) 85'; Neguț (yellow card) 87'	Stadium: Dr. Constantin Rădulescu; Attendance: 0 Referee: Florin Marcu (Oradea)

4 October 2020 6	Viitorul Constanța	1−1	CFR Cluj	Ovidiu
21:30 EEST (UTC+03)	Luckassen 7'; Gaztañaga (yellow card) 48'; Ghiță (yellow card) 52'; Iancu (yellow card) 87'	Report	Rondón (yellow card) 21'; Omrani (yellow card) 22'; Deac 54' (pen.), (yellow card) 66'; Cestor (yellow card) 63'; Camora (yellow card) 89'; Păun (yellow card) 90+1'	Stadium: Viitorul; Attendance: 0 Referee: Marcel Bârsan (Bucharest)

17 October 2020 7	CFR Cluj	2−1	Botoșani	Cluj-Napoca
21:30 EEST (UTC+03)	Debeljuh 15'; Hoban (yellow card) 35'; Vinícius 76'	Report	Fili 26'; Moescu (yellow card) 52' (yellow-red card) 82'; Roman (yellow card) 57'	Stadium: Dr. Constantin Rădulescu; Attendance: 0 Referee: Sebastian Colţescu (Craiova)

25 October 2020 8	Voluntari	0−1	CFR Cluj	Voluntari
21:30 EET (UTC+02)	Armaș (yellow card) 53'; Anderson (yellow card) 90+1'; De Lucas (yellow card) 90+2'	Report	Cestor (yellow card) 32'; Itu 72'; Aurélio (yellow card) 77'	Stadium: Anghel Iordănescu; Attendance: 0 Referee: Lucian Ruşandu (Sfântu Gheorghe)

1 November 2020 9	CFR Cluj	1−2	Gaz Metan Mediaș	Cluj-Napoca
21:00 EET (UTC+02)	Itu (yellow card) 5'; Manea (yellow card) 14'; Latovlevici (yellow card) 74'; Ciobotariu 90+2'; Rondón (yellow card) 90+5'	Report	Ciocan (yellow card) 12'; Yuri (yellow card) 21'; Deaconu 27'; Zé Manuel (yellow card) 45'; Dumitru 60'; Alceus (yellow card) 86'; Buzbuchi (yellow card) 88'; Larie (yellow card) 90+5'	Stadium: Dr. Constantin Rădulescu; Attendance: 0 Referee: George Găman (Craiova)

8 November 2020 10	Argeș Pitești	0−2	CFR Cluj	Piteşti
18:00 EET (UTC+02)	Leca (yellow card) 52'	Report	Rondón 14', 23'	Stadium: Nicolae Dobrin; Attendance: 0 Referee: Horia Mladinovici (Bucharest)

22 November 2020 11	CFR Cluj	0−1	UTA Arad	Cluj-Napoca
20:00 EET (UTC+02)	Žunić (yellow card) 90+4'	Report	Buhăcianu (yellow card) 50'; Hora 75'; Roșu (yellow card) 86'; Tescan (yellow card) 90+5'; Melinte (yellow card) 90+5'	Stadium: Dr. Constantin Rădulescu; Attendance: 0 Referee: Iulian Călin (Ștefănești)

6 December 2020 12	Politehnica Iași	0−2	CFR Cluj	Iași
20:45 EET (UTC+02)	De Iriondo (yellow card) 55'; Zajmović (yellow card) 61'	Report	Deac 14', 78' (pen.); Soares (yellow card) 54'; Chipciu (yellow card) 65'; Sušić (yellow card) 73'; Debeljuh (yellow card) 79'	Stadium: Emil Alexandrescu; Attendance: 0 Referee: Marcel Bârsan (Bucharest)

13 December 2020 13	CFR Cluj	2−0	FCSB	Cluj-Napoca
21:00 EET (UTC+02)	Deac (yellow card) 9', (goal) 35' (pen.); Costache (yellow card) 15', (goal) 74'; Vinícius (yellow card) 27'; Soares (yellow card) 40'; Chipciu (yellow card) 41'; Sušić (yellow card) 44'; Manea (yellow card) 82'; Đoković (yellow card) 89'; Bălgrădean (yellow card) 90'	Report	Crețu (yellow card) 34'; Miron (yellow card) 34'; Moruţan (yellow card) 90+2'	Stadium: Dr. Constantin Rădulescu; Attendance: 0 Referee: István Kovács (Carei)

17 December 2020 14	Dinamo București	0−2	CFR Cluj	Bucharest
20:30 EET (UTC+02)	Puljić (yellow card) 43'; Sorescu (yellow card) 60'; Nemec (yellow card) 62'; Răuță (yellow card) 65'; Bejan (yellow card) 87' (yellow-red card) 90+3'	Report	Debeljuh 14'; Soares (yellow card) 25'; Păun 44' (pen.); Pereira (yellow card) 76'; Itu (yellow card) 82'	Stadium: Dinamo; Attendance: 0 Referee: Marius Avram (Bucharest)

22 December 2020 15	CFR Cluj	0−0	Universitatea Craiova	Cluj-Napoca
21:00 EET (UTC+02)	Sušić (yellow card) 82'; Păun (yellow card) 85'; Pereira (yellow card) 90'	Report	Mamut (yellow card) 77'; Ofosu (yellow card) 81'	Stadium: Dr. Constantin Rădulescu; Attendance: 0 Referee: Radu Petrescu (Bucharest)

14 January 2021 16	CFR Cluj	3−1	Academica Clinceni	Cluj-Napoca
20:00 EET (UTC+02)	Costache 15'; Deac 51'; Burcă (yellow card) 56'; Sušić (yellow card) 71'; Debeljuh 90+1'; Păun (yellow card) 90+4'	Report	Tănase (yellow card) 4'; Dimitriu (yellow card) 11'; Cebotaru (yellow card) 45'; Chandarov 84'	Stadium: Dr. Constantin Rădulescu; Attendance: 0 Referee: Andrei Chivulete (Bucharest)

17 January 2021 17	Sepsi Sfântu Gheorghe	0−1	CFR Cluj	Sfântu Gheorghe
19:00 EET (UTC+02)	Fülöp (yellow card) 1'; Aganović (yellow card) 24'; Bouhenna (yellow card) 45+1' (yellow-red card) 49'	Report	Pereira (yellow card) 16'; Đoković (yellow card) 24'; Debeljuh 72'	Stadium: Municipal; Attendance: 0 Referee: Ovidiu Hațegan (Arad)

25 January 2021 18	Hermannstadt	1−3	CFR Cluj	Mediaș
20:30 EET (UTC+02)	Romário 33', (yellow card) 44'; Santos (yellow card) 48'; Addae (yellow card) 61'; Viera (yellow card) 72'	Report	Debeljuh (yellow card) 15', (goal) 51'; Chipciu 37'; Burcă (yellow card) 78'; Rondón 81'	Stadium: Gaz Metan; Attendance: 0 Referee: Iulian Călin (Ștefănești)

28 January 2021 19	CFR Cluj	1−1	Astra Giurgiu	Cluj-Napoca
20:00 EET (UTC+02)	Deac 80'	Report	Wüthrich (yellow card) 19'; Budescu 21'; Sousa (yellow card) 45+3'; V. Gheorghe (yellow card) 65'; Popa (yellow card) 90+2'	Stadium: Dr. Constantin Rădulescu; Attendance: 0 Referee: Adrian Cojocaru (Galați)

1 February 2021 20	Chindia Târgoviște	0−1	CFR Cluj	Giurgiu
20:00 EET (UTC+02)	Neguț (yellow card) 38'; Popa (yellow card) 58'	Report	Păun 52' (pen.); Camora (yellow card) 90+1'	Stadium: Marin Anastasovici; Attendance: 0 Referee: Radu Petrescu (Bucharest)

4 February 2021 21	CFR Cluj	2−1	Viitorul Constanța	Cluj-Napoca
20:00 EET (UTC+02)	Itu 31', (yellow card) 34'; Camora (yellow card) 74'; Hoban 90+3'	Report	Dobrosavlevici 52'; Benzar (yellow card) 56'; Gaztañaga (yellow card) 74'; Artean (yellow card) 90+4'	Stadium: Dr. Constantin Rădulescu; Attendance: 0 Referee: István Kovács (Carei)

8 February 2021 22	Botoșani	2−1	CFR Cluj	Botoșani
20:30 EET (UTC+02)	Papa 31'; Roman 37'	Report	Debeljuh 2'; Deac (yellow card) 13'; Costache (yellow card) 63'; Aurélio (yellow card) 66'	Stadium: Municipal; Attendance: 0 Referee: Horia Mladinovici (Bucharest)

15 February 2021 23	CFR Cluj	0−0	Voluntari	Cluj-Napoca
20:30 EET (UTC+02)	Debeljuh (yellow card) 40'; Hoban (yellow card) 75'; Burcă (yellow card) 87'; Chipciu (yellow card) 90+3'	Report	Ivanov (yellow card) 52'; Satli (yellow card) 69'; Rîmniceanu (yellow card) 87'; Betancor (yellow card) 89'	Stadium: Dr. Constantin Rădulescu; Attendance: 0 Referee: Marian Barbu (Făgăraș)

21 February 2021 24	Gaz Metan Mediaș	0−1	CFR Cluj	Mediaș
20:30 EET (UTC+02)	Zé Manuel (yellow card) 51'; Francisco (yellow card) 90+2'	Report	Omrani 75', (yellow card) 90+3'; Itu (yellow card) 90'	Stadium: Gaz Metan; Attendance: 0 Referee: Radu Petrescu (Bucharest)

1 March 2021 25	CFR Cluj	5−0	Argeș Pitești	Cluj-Napoca
20:30 EET (UTC+02)	Costache (yellow card) 2', (goal) 70'; Deac 35' (pen.), 38' (pen.); Bordeianu (yellow card) 36'; Debeljuh 49'; Rondón 77'; Omrani (yellow card) 88'; Burcă (yellow card) 90+1'	Report	Meza (yellow card) 25'	Stadium: Dr. Constantin Rădulescu; Attendance: 0 Referee: Sebastian Colţescu (Craiova)

6 March 2021 26	UTA Arad	0−1	CFR Cluj	Arad
21:30 EET (UTC+02)	Shlyakov (yellow card) 55'; Hora (yellow card) 63'; Buhăcianu (yellow card) 67'	Report	Rondón (yellow card) 66'; Vinícius 68'; Camora (yellow card) 90+1'	Stadium: Francisc von Neuman; Attendance: 0 Referee: Adrian Cojocaru (Galați)

14 March 2021 27	CFR Cluj	4−0	Politehnica Iași	Cluj-Napoca
20:30 EET (UTC+02)	Chipciu 44'; Omrani 45+2'; Deac 61', 87'; Ciobotariu (yellow card) 90+1'	Report	Frăsinescu (yellow card) 54'; Platini (yellow card) 86'	Stadium: Dr. Constantin Rădulescu; Attendance: 0 Referee: Horia Mladinovici (Bucharest)

19 March 2021 28	FCSB	3−0	CFR Cluj	Bucharest
20:30 EET (UTC+02)	Moruţan (yellow card) 45+3', (goal) 78'; Olaru 49'; Tănase 62', (yellow card) 81'	Report	Arlauskis (red card) 41'; Chipciu (yellow card) 70'; Bordeianu (yellow card) 73'; Sigurjónsson (yellow card) 82'	Stadium: Arena Națională; Attendance: 0 Referee: Ovidiu Hațegan (Arad)

5 April 2021 29	CFR Cluj	1−0	Dinamo București	Cluj-Napoca
20:30 EEST (UTC+03)	Deac (yellow card) 45+2'; Omrani (yellow card) 57', (goal) 80'; Bălgrădean (yellow card) 90+2'; Costache (yellow card) 90+3'	Report	Anton (yellow card) 9' (yellow-red card) 31'; Bejan (yellow card) 16' (yellow-red card) 37'; Răuță (yellow card) 45'; Moldoveanu (yellow card) 81'; Sorescu (yellow card) 90+3'	Stadium: Dr. Constantin Rădulescu; Attendance: 0 Referee: Marcel Bârsan (Bucharest)

11 April 2021 30	Universitatea Craiova	0−0	CFR Cluj	Craiova
21:30 EEST (UTC+03)	Bancu (yellow card) 29'; Cicâldău (yellow card) 35'; Papp (yellow card) 54'; Nistor (yellow card) 67'; Baiaram (yellow card) 79'; Koljič (yellow card) 88'	Report	Bordeianu (yellow card) 11'; Sigurjónsson (yellow card) 40'	Stadium: Ion Oblemenco; Attendance: 0 Referee: Ovidiu Hațegan (Arad)

==== Championship round ====
===== Table =====
Pos	Team	Pld	W	D	L	GF	GA	GD	Pts	Qualification
1	CFR Cluj (C)	10	7	1	2	15	5	+10	54	Qualification to Champions League first qualifying round
2	FCSB	10	3	3	4	13	14	−1	45	Qualification to Europa Conference League second qualifying round
3	Universitatea Craiova	10	3	3	4	9	11	−2	41	Qualification to Europa Conference League second qualifying round
4	Sepsi (O)	10	5	2	3	11	8	+3	40	Qualification to European competition play-offs
5	Academica Clinceni	10	3	2	5	10	15	−5	33	
6	Botoșani	10	3	1	6	13	18	−5	31	

Source: , FRF (in Romanian), LPF (in Romanian)
Rules for classification: 1) Points; 2) Points without rounding; 3) Head-to-head points; 4) Head-to-head goal difference; 5) Head-to-head goals scored; 6) Goal difference; 7) Goals scored; 8) Play-off (only if needed to decide champion or teams for UEFA competitions). (Note: only criteria 6 and 7 are applied to establish the classification during the competition.)
(C) Champions; (O) Play-off winners

===== Results summary =====
Overall								Home						Away					
Pld	W	D	L	GF	GA	GD	Pts	W	D	L	GF	GA	GD	W	D	L	GF	GA	GD
10	7	1	2	15	5	+10	22	3	0	2	8	3	+5	4	1	0	7	2	+5

Last updated: 25 May 2021.
Source: Liga I

===== Position by round =====
Round	1	2	3	4	5	6	7	8	9	10
Ground	H	A	H	H	A	A	H	A	A	H
Result	W	W	L	W	D	W	L	W	W	W
Position	2	2	2	1	1	1	1	1	1	1

Updated to match(es) played on 25 May 2021. Source: Liga I
A = Away; H = Home; W = Win; D = Draw; L = Loss

===== Matches =====
Win Draw Loss

18 April 2021 1	CFR Cluj	3−0	Academica Clinceni	Cluj-Napoca
18:30 EEST (UTC+03)	Rondón (yellow card) 23'; Chipciu (yellow card) 41'; Deac (yellow card) 44', (goal) 56'; Păun 53'; Debeljuh 89'	Report	Longher (yellow card) 3'; Tănase (yellow card) 53'; Dumitriu (yellow card) 86'	Stadium: Dr. Constantin Rădulescu; Attendance: 0 Referee: Sebastian Colţescu (Craiova)

21 April 2021 2	Sepsi Sfântu Gheorghe	0−1	CFR Cluj	Sfântu Gheorghe
21:30 EEST (UTC+03)	Păun (yellow card) 43'; Ştefănescu (yellow card) 53'; Mitrea (yellow card) 90'	Report	Ben Youssef (yellow card) 24'; Deac 45' (pen.); Hoban (yellow card) 54'; Chipciu (yellow card) 73'; Sigurjónsson (yellow card) 89'	Stadium: Municipal; Attendance: 0 Referee: István Kovács (Carei)

24 April 2021 3	CFR Cluj	1−2	Universitatea Craiova	Cluj-Napoca
20:30 EEST (UTC+03)	Soares (yellow card) 4'; Sigurjónsson 53'	Report	Ivan 27'; Cicâldău (yellow card) 76'; Constantin (yellow card) 82'; Tudorie 88', (yellow card) 89'	Stadium: Dr. Constantin Rădulescu; Attendance: 0 Referee: Ovidiu Hațegan (Arad)

28 April 2021 4	CFR Cluj	2−0	Botoșani	Cluj-Napoca
19:00 EEST (UTC+03)	Sigurjónsson 25', 28'; Camora (yellow card) 56'; Păun (yellow card) 89'; Latovlevici (red card) 89'; Omrani (yellow card) 90'	Report	Tîrcoveanu (yellow card) 17'; Papa (yellow card) 23'; Braun (yellow card) 38'; Al-Mawas (red card) 90'	Stadium: Dr. Constantin Rădulescu; Attendance: 0 Referee: Horia Mladinovici (Bucharest)

3 May 2021 5	FCSB	1−1	CFR Cluj	Giurgiu
20:30 EEST (UTC+03)	Florin Tănase 19' (pen.), (yellow card) 31'; Simion (yellow card) 22'; Ov. Popescu (yellow card) 85'	Report	Burcă (yellow card) 17', (goal) 90+3'; Ben Youssef (yellow card) 56'; Bordeianu (yellow card) 81'; Deac (yellow card) 85'	Stadium: Marin Anastasovici; Attendance: 0 Referee: Radu Petrescu (Bucharest)

6 May 2021 6	Academica Clinceni	0−1	CFR Cluj	Clinceni
17:00 EEST (UTC+03)		Report	Itu 6'; Bordeianu (yellow card) 36'; Camora (yellow card) 71'; Hoban (yellow card) 88'; Sigurjónsson (yellow card) 90'	Stadium: Clinceni; Attendance: 0 Referee: Marian Barbu (Făgăraș)

10 May 2021 7	CFR Cluj	0−1	Sepsi Sfântu Gheorghe	Cluj-Napoca
19:00 EEST (UTC+03)	Burcă (yellow card) 90'	Report	Šafranko 41'; Aganović (yellow card) 63'; Niczuly (yellow card) 90+2'	Stadium: Dr. Constantin Rădulescu; Attendance: 0 Referee: Andrei Chivulete (Bucharest)

15 May 2021 8	Universitatea Craiova	1−3	CFR Cluj	Craiova
21:30 EEST (UTC+03)	Baiaram 11'	Report	Păun 4', 74'; Vinícius (yellow card) 35'; Deac (yellow card) 36', (goal) 68'; Costache (yellow card) 59'	Stadium: Ion Oblemenco; Attendance: 0 Referee: István Kovács (Carei)

18 May 2021 9	Botoșani	0−1	CFR Cluj	Botoșani
20:30 EEST (UTC+03)		Report	Burcă 53'; Camora (yellow card) 79'	Stadium: Municipal; Attendance: 0 Referee: Sebastian Colţescu (Craiova)

25 May 2021 10	CFR Cluj	2−0	FCSB	Cluj-Napoca
20:30 EEST (UTC+03)	Gîdea 14', (yellow card) 34'; Rondón 66'; Deac (penalty missed) 76'; Pereira (yellow card) 90'	Report	Niţă (yellow card) 4'; Pantea (yellow card) 36'; Vînă (yellow card) 74'	Stadium: Dr. Constantin Rădulescu; Attendance: 0 Referee: Florin Marcu (Oradea)

=== Cupa României ===
CFR Cluj entered the Cupa României at the Round of 32.

29 November 2020 Round of 32	Politehnica Iași	1−0	CFR Cluj	Cluj-Napoca
20:30 EET (UTC+02)	Angiulli (yellow card) 59'; Calcan 63'; Onea (yellow card) 67'; Bősz (yellow card) 90+2'	Report	Chipciu (yellow card) 4'; Soares (yellow card) 42'; Sušić (yellow card) 82'	Stadium: Dr. Constantin Rădulescu; Attendance: 0 Referee: Iulian Dima (Bucharest)

=== Supercupa României ===
CFR Cluj will play in the Romanian Supercup as winners of the Liga I against Cupa României winners FCSB.

15 April 2021 Final	CFR Cluj	0−0 (a.e.t.) (4−1 p)	FCSB	Ploiești
19:00 EEST (UTC+03)	Debeljuh (yellow card) 30'; Deac (yellow card) 50'	Report	Radunović (yellow card) 51'; Nedelcu (yellow card) 84'	Stadium: Ilie Oană; Attendance: 0 Referee: Radu Petrescu (Bucharest)
	Penalties
	Rondón (penalty scored); Păun (penalty scored); Chipciu (penalty scored); Camora (penalty scored)		(penalty scored) Radunović; (penalty missed) Perianu; (penalty missed) Şut

=== UEFA Champions League ===
As winners of the 2019-20 Liga I, CFR Cluj entered the Champions League at the first qualifying round.

==== First qualifying round ====
The draw for the first round took place on 9 August. CFR Cluj was drawn to play against Maltese champions Floriana.

19 August 2020 QR1	Floriana (Malta)	0–2	(Romania) CFR Cluj	Ta' Qali
22:00 EEST (UTC+03)	Flávio Carioca (yellow card) 28'; Leone (yellow card) 49'; Keqi (yellow card) 52'; Camenzuli (yellow card) 87'	Report	Itu (yellow card) 45+2'; Cestor 53', (yellow card) 73'; Chipciu (yellow card) 87'; Bălgrădean (yellow card) 90+3'; Golofca 90+7'	Stadium: Centenary Stadium; Attendance: 0 Referee: Laurent Kopriwa (Luxembourg)

==== Second qualifying round ====
CFR Cluj advanced to the second qualifying round. The draw for the second round took place on 10 August. CFR Cluj was drawn to play against Croatian champions Dinamo Zagreb.

26 August 2020 QR2	CFR Cluj (Romania)	2−2 (a.e.t.) (5−6 p)	(Croatia) Dinamo Zagreb	Cluj-Napoca
21:00 EEST (UTC+03)	Deac (penalty missed) 52'; Pereira 64'; Bălgrădean (yellow card) 79'; Đoković (yellow card) 86'; Debeljuh (yellow card) 89', (goal) 90+3'; Burcă (yellow card) 90+3'; Bordeianu (yellow card) 92'; Rondón (yellow card) 115'	Report	Gojak 14'; Ademi (yellow card) 44'; Théophile-Catherine (red card) 51'; Mamić (yellow card) 66'; Kastrati 78', (yellow card) 119'; Leovac (yellow card) 82'; Livaković (yellow card) 90+2'; Petković (yellow card) 101'	Stadium: Dr. Constantin Rădulescu; Attendance: 0 Referee: António Nobre (Portugal)
	Penalties
	Vinícius (penalty scored); Đoković (penalty scored); Rondón (penalty scored); Sušić (penalty scored); Golofca (penalty missed); Deac (penalty scored); Boli (penalty missed)		(penalty scored) Petković; (penalty scored) Leovac; (penalty scored) Ademi; (penalty scored) Stojanović; (penalty missed) Gojak; (penalty scored) Dilaver; (penalty scored) Gvardiol

=== UEFA Europa League ===
After losing to Dinamo Zagreb in the Champions League second qualifying round, CFR Cluj progressed to the Europa League third qualifying round.

==== Third qualifying round ====
The draw for the third round took place on 1 September. CFR Cluj were drawn to face either the Swedish champions Djurgårdens IF or the champions of Gibraltar Europa. On 17 September Djurgårdens IF won against Europa 2−1.

24 September 2020 QR3	Djurgårdens IF (Sweden)	0−1	(Romania) CFR Cluj	Stockholm
20:00 EEST (UTC+03)	Eriksson (yellow card) 12'; Chilufya (yellow card) 44'; Ulvestad (yellow card) 90+5'	Report	Vinícius 55'; Bordeianu (yellow card) 80'; Rondón (yellow card) 90+3'	Stadium: Tele2 Arena; Attendance: 0 Referee: Bartosz Frankowski (Poland)

==== Play-off Round ====
CFR Cluj advanced to the play-off round. The draw for the play-off round took place on 18 September. CFR Cluj was drawn to play against Finnish champions KuPS.

1 October 2020 PO	CFR Cluj (Romania)	3–1	(Finland) KuPS	Cluj-Napoca
18:30 EEST (UTC+03)	Rondón 5', 56'; Debeljuh 42'	Report	Adjei-Boateng (yellow card) 39'; Udo 90+1'	Stadium: Dr. Constantin Rădulescu; Attendance: 0 Referee: Ivan Bebek (Croatia)

==== Group stage ====
CFR Cluj progressed to the Europa League group stage. The draw was held on 2 October. CFR Cluj was drawn with Roma, Young Boys and CSKA Sofia.

Pos	Team	Pld	W	D	L	GF	GA	GD	Pts	Qualification	ROM	YB	CLJ	CSS
1	(Italy) Roma	6	4	1	1	13	5	+8	13	Advance to knockout phase	—	3–1	5–0	0–0
2	(Switzerland) Young Boys	6	3	1	2	9	7	+2	10	Advance to knockout phase	1–2	—	2–1	3–0
3	(Romania) CFR Cluj	6	1	2	3	4	10	−6	5 (Note: Head-to-head points: CFR Cluj 4, CSKA Sofia 1.)		0–2	1–1	—	0–0
4	(Bulgaria) CSKA Sofia	6	1	2	3	3	7	−4	5		3–1	0–1	0–2	—

Source: UEFA
Rules for classification: Group stage tiebreakers
Notes:

22 October 2020 1	CSKA Sofia (Bulgaria)	0–2	(Romania) CFR Cluj	Sofia
19:55 EEST (UTC+03)	Yomov (yellow card) 61'; Vion (yellow card) 83'; Mattheij (yellow card) 90+3'	Report	Rondón 53'; Deac 74' (pen.); Chipciu (yellow card) 83'	Stadium: Vasil Levski; Attendance: 11,958; Referee: Halil Umut Meler (Turkey)

29 October 2019 2	CFR Cluj (Romania)	1−1	(Switzerland) Young Boys	Cluj-Napoca
22:00 EET (UTC+02)	Debeljuh (yellow card) 22'; Rondón 62'; Đoković (yellow card) 82'	Report	Fassnacht 69'; Aebischer (yellow card) 74'	Stadium: Dr. Constantin Rădulescu; Attendance: 0 Referee: Glenn Nyberg (Sweden)

5 November 2020 3	Roma (Italy)	5–0	(Romania) CFR Cluj	Rome
19:55 EET (UTC+02)	Mkhitaryan 2'; Ibañez 24'; Mayoral 34', 84'; Pedro 89'	Report	Hoban (yellow card) 61'; Carnat (yellow card) 81'	Stadium: Olimpico; Attendance: 0 Referee: Matej Jug (Slovenia)

26 November 2020 4	CFR Cluj (Romania)	0–2	(Italy) Roma	Cluj-Napoca
22:00 EET (UTC+02)	Itu (yellow card) 35'; Păun (yellow card) 37'; Đoković (yellow card) 43'; Burcă (yellow card) 66'; Camora (yellow card) 71'	Report	Debeljuh 49' (o.g.); Diawara (yellow card) 53'; Veretout 67' (pen.); Džeko (yellow card) 90+3'	Stadium: Dr. Constantin Rădulescu; Attendance: 0 Referee: Harald Lechner (Austria)

3 December 2020 5	CFR Cluj (Romania)	0−0	(Bulgaria) CSKA Sofia	Cluj-Napoca
22:00 EET (UTC+02)	Sušić (yellow card) 33'; Chipciu (yellow card) 54' (yellow-red card) 85'	Report	Vion (yellow card) 1'; Geferson (yellow card) 54'	Stadium: Dr. Constantin Rădulescu; Attendance: 0 Referee: Amaury Delerue (France)

10 December 2020 6	Young Boys (Switzerland)	2−1	(Romania) CFR Cluj	Bern
19:55 EET (UTC+02)	Von Ballmoos (yellow card) 84'; Nsame 90+3' (pen.), (red card) 90+5'; Sulejmani (yellow card) 90+4'; Gaudino 90+6'	Report	Păun (yellow card) 71'; Debeljuh 84'; Carnat (yellow card) 85'; Burcă (yellow card) 89'; Bălgrădean (red card) 90'; Deac (yellow card) 90'; Đoković (red card) 90+8'; Camora (yellow card) 90+9'	Stadium: Wankdorf; Attendance: 0 Referee: Benoît Bastien (France)

== Statistics ==
=== Appearances and goals ===
As of 18 May 2021

No.	Pos	Player	Liga I		Cupa României		Supercupa României		UEFA Champions League		UEFA Europa League		Total	
No.	Pos	Player	Apps	Goals	Apps	Goals	Apps	Goals	Apps	Goals	Apps	Goals	Apps	Goals
1	GK	(Romania) Rareș Murariu	0+1	0	0	0	0	0	0	0	0	0	1	0
3	DF	(Romania) Andrei Burcă	33+2	2	0	0	1	0	2	0	7	0	45	2
4	DF	(Romania) Cristian Manea	21+5	0	1	0	1	0	0	0	4+1	0	33	0
5	MF	(Brazil) Soares	10+6	0	1	0	1	0	0	0	0	0	18	0
6	MF	(Portugal) Luís Aurélio	4+7	0	1	0	0	0	0+1	0	0	0	13	0
7	MF	(Romania) Alexandru Păun	16+23	5	0	0	0+1	0	0	0	7+1	0	48	5
8	MF	(Iceland) Rúnar Már Sigurjónsson	7+5	3	0	0	0+1	0	0	0	0	0	13	3
9	FW	(France) Billel Omrani	4+12	3	0	0	0	0	0	0	1+2	0	19	3
10	MF	(Romania) Ciprian Deac	33+1	13	0	0	1	0	2	0	6+1	1	44	14
11	MF	(France) Michaël Pereira	10+11	0	0	0	0	0	2	1	3+5	0	31	1
12	GK	(Poland) Grzegorz Sandomierski	9+2	0	1	0	0	0	0	0	0+1	0	13	0
13	DF	(Romania) Denis Ciobotariu	10+1	1	1	0	0+1	0	0	0	1	0	14	1
14	DF	(Romania) Iasmin Latovlevici	2+5	0	1	0	0	0	0	0	0+1	0	9	0
15	DF	(Tunisia) Syam Ben Youssef	7	0	0	0	1	0	0	0	0	0	8	0
16	DF	(Bosnia and Herzegovina) Mateo Sušić	20+6	0	0+1	0	0	0	0+2	0	7+1	0	37	0
18	MF	(Romania) Valentin Costache	26+9	4	1	0	1	0	0	0	0	0	37	4
20	FW	(Moldova) Gheorghe Gondiu	0+1	0	0	0	0	0	0	0	0	0	1	0
22	FW	(Croatia) Gabriel Debeljuh	22+10	9	0+1	0	1	0	1	1	6+2	2	43	12
23	FW	(Romania) Raul Haiduc	0	0	0+1	0	0	0	0	0	0	0	1	0
27	MF	(Romania) Alexandru Chipciu	11+19	2	1	0	0+1	0	2	0	1+3	0	38	2
28	MF	(Romania) Ovidiu Hoban	12+16	1	0	0	1	0	1	0	4+2	0	36	1
34	GK	(Romania) Cristian Bălgrădean	25+1	0	0	0	0	0	2	0	8	0	36	0
37	MF	(Romania) Mihai Bordeianu	15+1	0	0	0	0	0	1	0	2	0	19	0
45	DF	(Portugal) Camora	34	0	0	0	1	0	2	0	8	0	45	0
55	DF	(Brazil) Paulo Vinícius	24+1	3	0	0	0	0	2	0	5	1	32	4
75	FW	(Romania) Adrian Gîdea	19+2	1	0	0	1	0	0	0	0	0	22	1
87	GK	(Lithuania) Giedrius Arlauskis	6	0	0	0	1	0	0	0	0	0	7	0
92	DF	(Democratic Republic of the Congo) Mike Cestor	6	0	0	0	0	0	1	1	0	0	7	1
94	MF	(Romania) Cătălin Itu	18+6	3	0	0	0	0	1+1	0	2+1	0	29	3
96	DF	(Romania) Dodi Joca	5	0	0	0	0	0	0	0	0+1	0	6	0
98	MF	(Romania) Nicolae Carnat	3+7	0	1	0	0	0	0	0	0+4	0	15	0
99	FW	(Venezuela) Mario Rondón	14+15	5	0+1	0	0+1	0	1+1	0	8	4	41	9
Players who appeared for CFR Cluj that left during the season:
8	MF	(Croatia) Damjan Đoković	9+7	0	0	0	0	0	1	0	8	0	25	0
21	DF	(Ivory Coast) Kévin Boli	1	0	0	0	0	0	1	0	0	0	2	0
21	DF	(Croatia) Ivica Žunić	0+1	0	1	0	0	0	0	0	0	0	2	0
23	FW	(Romania) Cătălin Golofca	0+1	0	0	0	0	0	0+2	1	0	0	3	1
33	DF	(Romania) Mihai Butean	1	0	0	0	0	0	0	0	0	0	1	0
62	MF	(Romania) Claudiu Petrila	0+6	1	0	0	0	0	0	0	0	0	6	1
77	FW	(Slovakia) Jakub Vojtuš	2+5	0	1	0	0	0	0	0	0+3	0	11	0

=== Squad statistics ===
	Liga I	Cupa României	Supercupa României	UEFA Champions League	UEFA Europa League	Home	Away	Neutral	Total Stats
Games played	40	1	1	2	8	25	26	1	52
Games won	26	0	0	1	3	12	18	0	30
Games drawn	6	0	1	1	2	8	3	1	12
Games lost	6	1	0	0	3	5	5	0	10
Goals scored	57	0	0	4	8	36	33	0	69
Goals conceded	20	1	0	2	11	16	18	0	34
Goal difference	37	−1	0	2	−3	20	15	0	35
Clean sheets	25	0	1	1	3	13	16	1	30
Goal by Substitute	0	0	0	0	0	0	0	0	0
Total shots	–	–	–	–	–	–	–	–	–
Shots on target	–	–	–	–	–	–	–	–	–
Corners	–	–	–	–	–	–	–	–	–
Players used	–	–	–	–	–	–	–	–	–
Offsides	–	–	–	–	–	–	–	–	–
Fouls suffered	–	–	–	–	–	–	–	–	–
Fouls committed	–	–	–	–	–	–	–	–	–
Yellow cards	0	0	0	0	0	0	0	0	0
Red cards	0	0	0	0	0	0	0	0	0
Winning rate	0%	0%	0%	0%	0%	0%	0%	0%	0%

Last updated: 25 May 2021
Source: Competitive matches

=== Goalscorers ===
As of 25 May 2021

Rank	Position	Name	Liga I	Cupa României	Supercupa României	Champions League	Europa League	Total
1	MF	(Romania) Ciprian Deac	13	0	0	0	1	14
2	FW	(Croatia) Gabriel Debeljuh	9	0	0	1	2	12
3	FW	(Venezuela) Mario Rondón	5	0	0	0	4	9
4	MF	(Romania) Alexandru Păun	5	0	0	0	0	5
5	FW	(Romania) Valentin Costache	4	0	0	0	0	4
6	DF	(Brazil) Paulo Vinícius	3	0	0	0	1	4
7	FW	(France) Billel Omrani	3	0	0	0	0	3
8	MF	(Iceland) Rúnar Már Sigurjónsson	3	0	0	0	0	3
9	MF	(Romania) Cătălin Itu	3	0	0	0	0	3
10	MF	(Romania) Alexandru Chipciu	2	0	0	0	0	2
11	DF	(Romania) Andrei Burcă	2	0	0	0	0	2
12	DF	(Democratic Republic of the Congo) Mike Cestor	0	0	0	1	0	1
13	FW	(Romania) Cătălin Golofca	0	0	0	1	0	1
14	MF	(Romania) Claudiu Petrila	1	0	0	0	0	1
15	MF	(France) Michaël Pereira	0	0	0	1	0	1
16	DF	(Romania) Denis Ciobotariu	1	0	0	0	0	1
17	MF	(Romania) Ovidiu Hoban	1	0	0	0	0	1
18	FW	(Romania) Adrian Gîdea	1	0	0	0	0	1
–	–	Own goal	1	0	0	0	0	1

=== Goal minutes ===
	1'–15'	16'–30'	31'–HT	46'–60'	61'–75'	76'–FT	Extra time	Forfeit
Goals	11	3	11	13	16	15	0	0
Percentage	15.94%	4.35%	15.94%	18.84%	23.19%	21.74%	0%	0%

Last updated: 25 May 2021
Source: Soccerway

=== Hat-tricks ===
Player	Against	Result	Date	Competition

=== Clean sheets ===
As of 25 May 2021

Rank	Name	Liga I	Cupa României	Supercupa României	UEFA Champions League	UEFA Europa League	Total	Games played
1	(Romania) Cristian Bălgrădean	17 (1)	0	0	1	3	21 (1)	35 (1)
2	(Poland) Grzegorz Sandomierski	4 (1)	0	0	0	0	4 (1)	10 (2)
3	(Lithuania) Giedrius Arlauskis	4	0	1	0	0	5	7
4	(Romania) Rareș Murariu	0 (1)	0	0	0	0	0 (1)	0 (1)
Total		24	0	1	1	3	30	52

=== Disciplinary record ===
N	P	Nat.	Name	Liga I			Cupa României			Supercupa României			UEFA Champions League			UEFA Europa League			Total			Notes
N	P	Nat.	Name	Yellow card	Second yellow card	Red card	Yellow card	Second yellow card	Red card	Yellow card	Second yellow card	Red card	Yellow card	Second yellow card	Red card	Yellow card	Second yellow card	Red card	Yellow card	Second yellow card	Red card	Notes
3	DF	(Romania)	Burcă	6									1			2			9			
4	DF	(Romania)	Manea	3															3			
5	MF	(Brazil)	Soares	4			1												5			
6	MF	(Portugal)	Aurélio	2															2			
7	MF	(Romania)	Păun	5												2			7			
8	MF	(Iceland)	Sigurjónsson	3									1						4			
8	MF	(Croatia)	Đoković	3									1			2		1	6		1	
9	FW	(France)	Omrani	6															6			
10	MF	(Romania)	Deac	8						1						1			10			
11	MF	(France)	Pereira	5															5			
13	DF	(Romania)	Ciobotariu	1															1			
14	DF	(Romania)	Latovlevici	1		1													1		1	
15	DF	(Tunisia)	Syam Ben Youssef	2															2			
16	DF	(Bosnia and Herzegovina)	Sušić	4			1									1			6			
18	FW	(Romania)	Costache	6															6			
21	DF	(Croatia)	Žunić	1															1			
21	DF	(Ivory Coast)	Boli	1															1			
22	FW	(Croatia)	Debeljuh	5						1			1			1			8			
27	MF	(Romania)	Chipciu	6			1						1			1	1		9	1		
28	MF	(Romania)	Hoban	4												1			5			
34	GK	(Romania)	Bălgrădean	2									2					1	4		1	
37	MF	(Romania)	Bordeianu	6									1			1			8			
45	DF	(Portugal)	Camora	7												2			9			
55	DF	(Brazil)	Vinícius	2															2			
75	FW	(Romania)	Adrian Gîdea	1															1			
77	FW	(Slovakia)	Vojtuš	1															1			
87	GK	(Lithuania)	Arlauskis			1															1	
92	DF	(Democratic Republic of the Congo)	Cestor	3									1						4			
94	MF	(Romania)	Itu	5									1			1			7			
98	MF	(Romania)	Carnat													1			1			
99	FW	(Colombia)	Rondón	4									1			1			6			

Last updated: 25 May 2021
Source: Competitive matches
Only competitive matches
Ordered by (red card) , (second yellow card) and (yellow card)
(yellow card) = Number of bookings; (second yellow card) = Number of sending offs after a second yellow card; (red card) = Number of sending offs by a direct red card.

== See also ==
- 2020–21 Cupa României
- 2020–21 Liga I
