= 2022 Supercupa României =

- Event: 2022 Supercupa României
CFR Cluj	Sepsi OSK
Liga I	Cupa României
1	2
- Date: 9 July 2022
- Venue: Stadionul Francisc von Neuman, Arad
- Referee: Adrian Cojocaru
- Attendance: 10,571

The 2022 Supercupa României was the 24th edition of the Supercupa României, an annual football super cup contested by the winners of the previous season's Liga I and Cupa României competitions. It was the first Supercupa României edition to use the VAR system.

The game featured CFR Cluj and Sepsi OSK, and Stadionul Francisc von Neuman in Arad hosted the final for the first time on 9 July 2022. Sepsi OSK won the match and the first Supercupa in club history.

== Teams ==
Team	Qualification	Previous participations (bold indicates winners)
CFR Cluj	Winners of the 2021–22 Liga I	8 (**2009**, **2010**, 2012, 2016, **2018**, 2019, **2020**, 2021)
Sepsi OSK	Winners of the 2021–22 Cupa României	None

== Match ==
=== Details ===
9 July 2022
20:30 EEST (UTC+03)

CFR Cluj	1–2	Sepsi OSK
Păun 2'	Report 1 Report 2	Matei 45+3'; Rondón 85'

Stadionul Francisc von Neuman, Arad
Attendance: 10,571
Referee: Adrian Cojocaru

GK	34	(Romania) Cristian Bălgrădean
RB	47	(Germany) Christopher Braun
CB	44	(Brazil) Yuri Matias
CB	6	(Bosnia and Herzegovina) Daniel Graovac
LB	45	(Portugal) Camora (c)
RCM	73	(Croatia) Karlo Muhar		(substituted off) 72'
CM	37	(Romania) Mihai Bordeianu	(yellow card) 66'	(substituted off) 86'
LCM	7	(Romania) Adrian Păun		(substituted off) 63'
RW	27	(Romania) Claudiu Petrila		(yellow card) 86'
CF	9	(Croatia) Marko Dugandžić	(yellow card) 45+2'	(substituted off) 62'
LW	10	(Romania) Ciprian Deac
Substitutes:
GK	90	(Romania) Răzvan Sava
RB	24	(Romania) Rareș Bălan
LB	2	(Croatia) Karlo Bručić
CM	94	(Romania) Cătălin Itu
CM	75	(Romania) Adrian Gîdea		(substituted on) 86'
CM	8	(Brazil) Roger	(red card) 90+1'	(substituted on) 86'
CM	28	(Romania) Ovidiu Hoban		(substituted on) 72'
CF	17	(Spain) Jefté Betancor		(substituted on) 62'
CF	15	(Ghana) Emmanuel Yeboah		(substituted on) 63'
Manager:
(Romania) Dan Petrescu

GK	33	(Romania) Roland Niczuly	(yellow card) 90+5'
RB	20	(Romania) Andres Dumitrescu	(yellow card) 59'
CB	44	(Romania) Mihai Bălașa
CB	3	(Romania) Bogdan Mitrea (c)
LB	88	(Bulgaria) Radoslav Dimitrov
LCM	6	(Romania) Nicolae Păun
CM	77	(Croatia) Adnan Aganović		(substituted off) 83'
RCM	21	(Romania) Cristian Bărbuț		(substituted off) 59'
RW	13	(Romania) Cosmin Matei		(substituted off) 60'
CF	9	(Romania) Alexandru Tudorie		(substituted off) 76'
LW	11	(Romania) Marius Ștefănescu
Substitutes:
GK	12	(Romania) Răzvan Began
LB	27	(Romania) Rareș Ispas
CB	82	(Slovakia) Branislav Niňaj
CB	45	(Romania) Denis Ciobotariu
CM	8	(Romania) Ion Gheorghe		(substituted on) 60'
CM	90	(Romania) Cătălin Golofca		(substituted on) 59'
CF	29	(Moldova) Vitalie Damașcan
CF	99	(Venezuela) Mario Rondón		(substituted on) 76'
CF	22	(Guinea-Bissau) Francisco Júnior		(substituted on) 83'
Manager:
(Italy) Cristiano Bergodi

**MAN OF THE MATCH**

**MATCH OFFICIALS**

- Assistant referees:
  - Valentin Avram
  - Ciprian Danșa
- Fourth official:
  - Iulian Dima
- Additional assistant referees:

**MATCH RULES**

- 90 minutes.
- Penalty shoot-out if scores still level.
- Nine named substitutes.
- Maximum of five substitutions.

== See also ==
- 2022–23 Liga I
- 2022–23 Cupa României
