= 2024–25 Sepsi OSK Sfântu Gheorghe season =

Sepsi OSK
2024–25 season
- Manager: Bernd Storck
- Stadium: Sepsi Arena Stadium
- Liga I: 2nd
- Cupa României: Pre-season
- Average home league attendance: 3,179
Home colours	Away colours	Third colours

The 2024–25 season is the 14th season in the history of Sepsi OSK, and the club's eighth consecutive season in Liga I. In addition to the domestic league, the team is scheduled to participate in the Cupa României.

== Transfers ==
=== In ===
Pos.	Player	Transferred from	Fee	Date	Source
FW	(Serbia) Mihajlo Nešković	(Serbia) FK Voždovac	€150,000	1 July 2024	
MF	(Japan) Sota Mino	(Romania) FC Hermannstadt	Free	1 July 2024	
MF	(Netherlands) Michael Breij	(Netherlands) SC Cambuur	Free	1 July 2024	
MF	(Hungary) Dávid Sigér	(Hungary) Fehérvár FC	Free	1 July 2024	
MF	(Romania) Marian Drăghiceanu	(Romania) CSM Reșița	Free	1 July 2024	
DF	(Israel) Nir Bardea	(Azerbaijan) Sabail FK	Free	8 July 2024	

=== Out ===
Pos.	Player	Transferred to	Fee	Date	Source
FW	(Moldova) Vitalie Damașcan	(Israel) Maccabi Petah Tikva	Undisclosed	29 July 2024	

== Friendlies ==
=== Pre-season ===
20 June 2024 Friendly	Sepsi OSK (Romania)	1–1	(Romania) Unirea Slobozia	Simeria
11:00 UTC+3				Stadium: Stadionul Sportiv

27 June 2024 Friendly	Ferencváros (Hungary)	4–4	(Romania) Sepsi OSK	Bad Loipersdorf, Austria
17:30
Note: 2 x 60 minutes

3 July 2024 Friendly	Austria Wien	3–1	(Romania) Sepsi OSK	Bad Tatzmannsdorf, Austria
18:00				Stadium: Sportplatz Bad Tatzmannsdorf

== Competitions ==
=== Overall record ===
Competition	First match	Last match	Starting round	Record							
Competition	First match	Last match	Starting round	Pld	W	D	L	GF	GA	GD	Win %
Liga I	13 July 2024		Matchday 1	4	2	2	0	6	4	+2	50.00
Cupa României				0	0	0	0	0	0	+0	—
Total				4	2	2	0	6	4	+2	50.00

Last updated: 5 August 2024
Source: Soccerway

=== Liga I ===
==== League table ====
Pos	Team	Pld	W	D	L	GF	GA	GD	Pts	Advances
5	Dinamo București	30	13	12	5	41	26	+15	51	Qualification for play-off round
6	Rapid București	30	11	13	6	35	26	+9	46	Qualification for play-off round
7	Sepsi OSK	30	11	8	11	38	35	+3	41 (Note: Ranked on head-to-head goal difference: Sepsi (+3); Hermannstadt (-3).)	Qualification for play-out round
8	Hermannstadt	30	11	8	11	34	40	−6	41	Qualification for play-out round
9	Petrolul Ploiești	30	9	13	8	29	29	0	40	Qualification for play-out round

Source: LPF (in Romanian)
Rules for classification: 1) Points; 2) Head-to-head points; 3) Head-to-head goal difference; 4) Head-to-head goals scored; 5) Goal difference; 6) Goals scored; 7) Play-off.

==== Results summary ====
Overall								Home						Away					
Pld	W	D	L	GF	GA	GD	Pts	W	D	L	GF	GA	GD	W	D	L	GF	GA	GD
4	2	2	0	6	4	+2	8	1	1	0	2	1	+1	1	1	0	4	3	+1

Last updated: 5 August 2024.

==== Results by round ====
Round	1	2	3	4	5
Ground	H	A	H	A	H
Result	W	W	D	D	
Position	3	1			

Updated to match(es) played on 5 August 2024. Source:
A = Away; H = Home; W = Win; D = Draw; L = Loss

==== Matches ====
The match schedule was released on 1 July 2024.

13 July 2024 1	Sepsi OSK	1–0	Politehnica Iași	Sfântu Gheorghe
17:00 UTC+3	Matei 23'		Mihai (yellow card) 79'	Stadium: Sepsi Arena Stadium; Referee: Marcel Bîrsan

22 July 2024 2	Gloria Buzău	1–2	Sepsi OSK	Buzău
18:30 UTC+3	Tescan 86'		Ciobotariu 12'; Coman 30'	Stadium: Buzău Municipal Stadium; Referee: Iulian Călin

27 July 2024 3	Sepsi OSK	1–1	Dinamo București	Sfântu Gheorghe
22:00 UTC+3	Ștefan 29'; Ciobotariu (yellow card) 38'; Nešković (yellow card) 71'		Abdallah (yellow card) 3'; Cîrjan (yellow card) 42'; Politic (yellow card) 56'; Neagu 74'	Stadium: Sepsi Arena Stadium; Referee: Fesnic Horatiu Mircea

5 August 2024 4	Rapid București	2–2	Sepsi OSK	Bucharest
22:00	Blažek 3'; Petrila 42'		Varga 1'; Debeljuh 68'	Stadium: Rapid-Giulești Stadium; Referee: Marian Barbu

11 August 2024 5	Sepsi OSK	v	Universitatea Craiova	Sfântu Gheorghe
19:00 UTC+3				Stadium: Sepsi Arena Stadium
