= William Soares =

William Soares may refer to:

- William Soares (footballer, born 1985), Brazilian football centre-back
- William Soares (footballer, born 1988), Brazilian football midfielder
