= Ciprian Deac =

Romanian former footballer (born 1986)

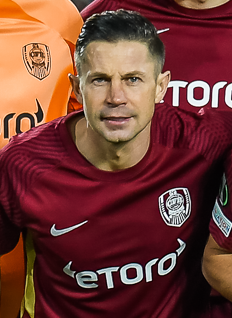
- Deac with CFR Cluj in 2023

Personal information
- Full name: Ioan Ciprian Deac
- Date of birth: 16 February 1986 (age 40)
- Place of birth: Dej, Romania
- Height: 1.77 m (5 ft 10 in)
- Positions: Winger; attacking midfielder

Team information
- Current team: CFR Cluj (vice-president)

Youth career
- 1994–2004: Unirea Dej
- 2004: Gloria Bistrița

Senior career*
Years	Team	Apps	(Gls)
2005–2006	Unirea Dej	27	(2)
2006–2010	CFR Cluj	67	(4)
2008	→ Oțelul Galați (loan)	15	(2)
2010–2012	Schalke 04	2	(0)
2011–2012	→ Rapid București (loan)	30	(9)
2012–2015	CFR Cluj	64	(11)
2015–2016	Aktobe	15	(1)
2016–2017	Tobol	31	(2)
2017–2026	CFR Cluj	264	(64)
Total		515	(95)

International career
2007–2008	Romania U21	9	(1)
2010–2020	Romania	26	(4)

Managerial career
- 2026–: CFR Cluj (vice-president)
- * Club domestic league appearances and goals as of 22 May 2026

Ioan Ciprian Deac (Romanian pronunciation: [tʃipriˈan iˈo̯an ˈde̯ak, - deˈak]; born 16 February 1986) is a Romanian former professional footballer who played as a winger or an attacking midfielder, currently the vice-president of Liga I club CFR Cluj.

After beginning his career at Unirea Dej, Deac spent most of his career at CFR Cluj, where he amassed over 390 Liga I matches and won fourteen domestic honours. He also had loan spells at Oțelul Galați and Rapid București in Romania, while abroad he represented Schalke 04 in Germany and Aktobe and Tobol in Kazakhstan.

Widely regarded as one of the most successful players in the history of the Romanian championship, Deac ranks second on the all-time list of league titles won, alongside Giedrius Arlauskis, Adrian Bumbescu, Mircea Lucescu, Tudorel Stoica, and Dumitru Stângaciu, with seven titles each.

At international level, Deac made his senior debut for Romania in March 2010, in a 0–2 friendly defeat to Israel. He earned 26 caps and scored one goal before retiring in 2020.

== Club career ==
=== Early career / Unirea Dej ===
Deac played as a youngster for Gloria Bistrița, where he was initially deployed as a striker.

He made his senior debut with Unirea Dej, at the time a second division team. He spent there two seasons and was already scouted by CFR Cluj, however the club who insisted more was Universitatea Cluj who took him for a trial in the camp from Hungary. He managed to impress, however after spending near two months with "U" Cluj the transfer failed due money problems.

=== CFR Cluj ===
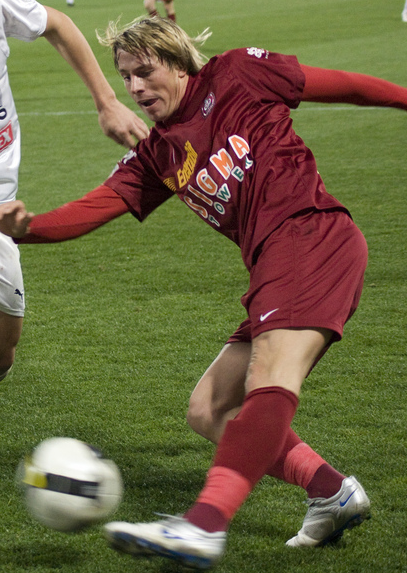
Deac playing for CFR Cluj in a Liga I match against Gloria Bistrița, on 3 April 2010.

Deac was finally signed by CFR Cluj during the 2005–06 season, and made his Liga I debut on 6 August 2006 against Unirea Urziceni in a 4–0 victory. During the 2006–07 season led by coach Cristiano Bergodi, he only made eleven appearances for them finishing third place in the Championship. The highlight of his career began in 2007–08 the team's new coach, was Ioan Andone, formerly of Dinamo București who won both the Championship and the Cup.

Deac was loaned out to Oțelul Galați during the 2008 half-season where he made fifteen appearances scoring two goals.

Because of his good performances at Oțelul, Deac was preserved in the CFR Cluj roster for the 2008–09 season. In the first part of the season he made nine appearances. The lack of playing time lead him to consider leaving the club. But with the upcoming new coach Dušan Uhrin, Jr., Deac gave up this plan, receiving assurances that he would be used more. In the 2009–10 season, the team managed to win the league title for the second time in its history, the coach being Andrea Mandorlini who said "Deac has grown into an incredible manner, quantitatively and qualitatively". In the 2010 Super Cup match Deac helped the team prevent a defeat, pushing the game into the penalty shootout. After the match, he was chosen as Man of the match.

=== Schalke 04 ===
On 27 August 2010, Deac signed for the German club Schalke 04 on a three-year contract. The reported transfer fee was €3 million. He made his debut for Die Königsblauen on 14 September, in a Champions League game against Olympique Lyonnais. He only played in the first half, and had a poor performance. He had a very sporadic season in Germany, only appearing in six games, and not putting in very convincing performances.

In the summer of 2011, Deac was loaned to Liga I team, Rapid București for the 2011–12 campaign. Schalke hoped he would regain his form that brought him to the international level.

On 20 December, he scored two goals against FC Vaslui. Although he was sent off, his team won the game with a 3–2 victory, with Nicolae Grigore scoring the winning goal in extratime. On 7 April 2012, Deac scored a goal in the 5–0 thrashing of CFR Cluj.

=== Return to CFR Cluj ===
On 30 May 2012, Deac returned to CFR Cluj, where he signed a contract for three years.

=== Kazakhstan ===
On 23 June 2015, Deac signed a two-and-a-half-year contract with Kazakhstan Premier League side FC Aktobe. Following the conclusion of the 2015 season, Deac was transfer listed by Aktobe.

=== Third spell at CFR Cluj ===
Deac once again returned to CFR Cluj in January 2017. He played 15 matches and netted six goals in the remainder of the season, his good display drawing interest from fellow league team FC Steaua București.

He nevertheless chose to stay with the Alb-vișinii and was offered the number 10 shirt ahead of the 2017–18 campaign. He recorded his first goal of the season in a 1–0 away win over Concordia Chiajna on 17 September 2017. Deac contributed with five goals and eleven assists, with the side claiming the fourth national championship in its history.

== International career ==
Deac made his debut for the Romania under-21 team on 1 June 2007, in a 1–1 draw against France. He was selected by manager Victor Pițurcă for Romania's preliminary squad to play at the UEFA Euro 2008, but eventually missed out on the final list. On 5 March 2010, Deac finally earned his first cap for the seniors in a 0–2 friendly match loss to Israel in Timișoara.

In August 2017, following a six-year absence, he was called up by Christoph Daum for the 2018 FIFA World Cup qualifying matches against Armenia and Montenegro. Deac scored his first goal for the national team in a 1–1 draw with Denmark, on 8 October 2017.

== Career statistics ==
=== Club ===
As of match played 22 May 2026

Appearances and goals by club, season and competition
Club	Season	League			National cup (Note: Includes Cupa României, Kazakhstan Cup)		Continental		Other		Total	
Club	Season	Division	Apps	Goals	Apps	Goals	Apps	Goals	Apps	Goals	Apps	Goals
Unirea Dej	2004–05	Divizia B	4	0	0	0	0	0	—		4	0
Unirea Dej	2005–06	Divizia B	23	2	2	0	0	0	—		25	2
Unirea Dej	Total		27	2	2	0	0	0	—		29	2
CFR Cluj	2006–07	Liga I	11	0	0	0	0	0	—		11	0
CFR Cluj	2007–08	Liga I	10	0	1	0	1 (Note: Appearances in UEFA Cup)	0	—		12	0
CFR Cluj	2008–09	Liga I	18	2	2	0	2 (Note: Appearances in UEFA Champions League)	0	—		22	2
CFR Cluj	2009–10	Liga I	24	2	3	0	6 (Note: Appearances in UEFA Europa League)	0	—		33	2
CFR Cluj	2010–11	Liga I	4	0	0	0	0	0	1 (Note: Appearances in Supercupa României)	0	5	0
CFR Cluj	Total		67	4	6	0	9	0	1	0	83	4
Oțelul Galați (loan)	2007–08	Liga I	15	2	0	0	0	0	—		15	2
Schalke 04	2010–11	Bundesliga	2	0	0	0	3	0	—		5	0
Rapid București (loan)	2011–12	Liga I	30	9	5	2	7	1	—		42	12
CFR Cluj	2012–13	Liga I	18	3	4	0	1	0	1	0	24	3
CFR Cluj	2013–14	Liga I	28	6	1	0	—		—		29	6
CFR Cluj	2014–15	Liga I	18	2	1	0	4 (Note: One appearance in UEFA Champions League, four appearances in UEFA Europa League)	0	—		23	2
CFR Cluj	Total		64	11	6	0	5	0	1	0	76	11
Aktobe	2015	Kazakhstan Premier League	15	1	1	0	2	0	—		18	1
Tobol	2016	Kazakhstan Premier League	31	2	1	0	0	0	—		32	2
CFR Cluj	2016–17	Liga I	14	6	1	0	0	0	0	0	15	6
CFR Cluj	2017–18	Liga I	34	5	1	0	0	0	0	0	35	5
CFR Cluj	2018–19	Liga I	26	4	4	0	2	0	1	0	33	4
CFR Cluj	2019–20	Liga I	25	14	0	0	16 (Note: Eight appearances and one goal in UEFA Champions League, eight appearances and three goals in UEFA Europa League)	4	1	0	42	18
CFR Cluj	2020–21	Liga I	34	13	0	0	9 (Note: Two appearances in UEFA Champions League, seven appearances and one goal in UEFA Europa League)	1	1	0	44	14
CFR Cluj	2021–22	Liga I	39	10	1	0	14 (Note: Six appearances in UEFA Champions League and one goal, two appearances in UEFA Europa League, six appearances in UEFA Conference League and one goal)	2	1	0	55	12
CFR Cluj	2022–23	Liga I	31	6	2	0	16 (Note: Two appearances in UEFA Champions League, fourteen appearances in UEFA Conference League and two goals)	2	1	0	50	8
CFR Cluj	2023–24	Liga I	33	3	4	0	0	0	—		37	3
CFR Cluj	2024–25	Liga I	19	3	3	0	5 (Note: Appearances in UEFA Conference League)	0	—		27	3
CFR Cluj	2025–26	Liga I	9	0	2	0	1	0	1	0	13	0
CFR Cluj	Total		264	64	18	0	62	9	6	0	351	73
Career total			515	94	39	2	89	10	8	0	651	107

=== International ===
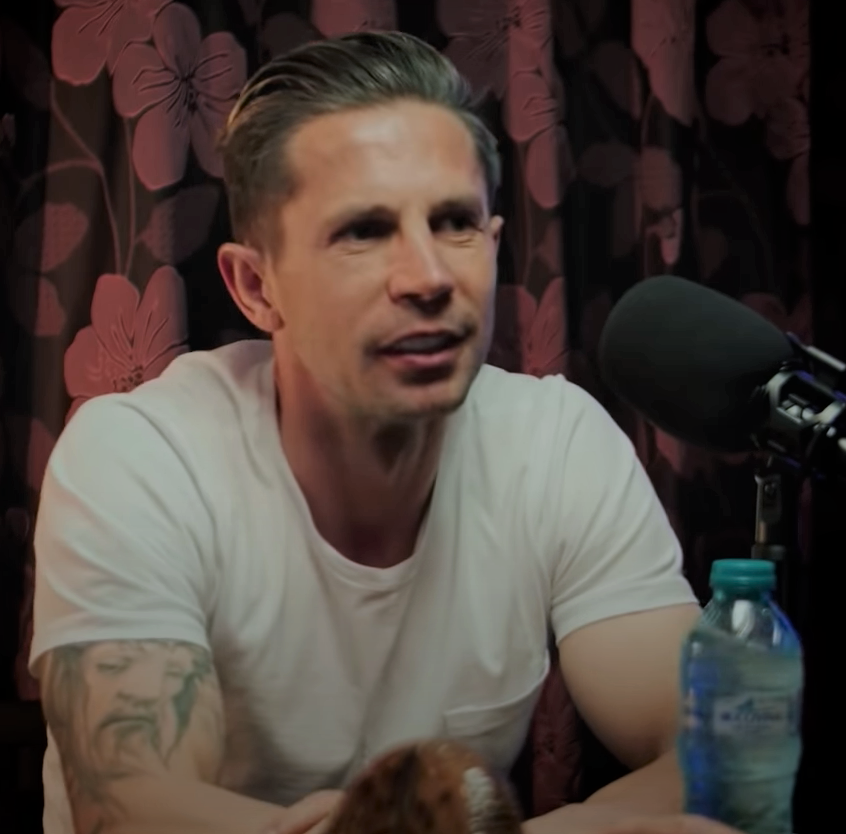
Deac during a podcast in 2021.

As of match played 14 October 2020

Appearances and goals by national team and year
National team	Year	Apps	Goals
Romania	2010	9	0
Romania	2011	2	0
Romania	2017	2	1
Romania	2018	5	2
Romania	2019	5	1
Romania	2020	3	0
Total		26	4

Scores and results list Romania's goal tally first, score column indicates score after each Deac goal.

List of international goals scored by Ciprian Deac
No.	Date	Venue	Cap	Opponent	Score	Result	Competition
1	8 October 2017	Telia Parken, Copenhagen, Denmark	12	Denmark	1–1	1–1	2018 FIFA World Cup qualification
2	31 May 2018	Sportzentrum Graz-Weinzödl, Graz, Austria	15	Chile	2–2	3–2	Friendly
3	5 June 2018	Stadionul Ilie Oană, Ploiești, Romania	16	Finland	2–0	2–0	Friendly
4	26 March 2019	Stadionul Dr. Constantin Rădulescu, Cluj, Romania	19	Faroe Islands	1–0	4–1	UEFA Euro 2020 qualifying

== Honours ==
CFR Cluj

- Liga I: 2007–08, 2009–10, 2017–18, 2018–19, 2019–20, 2020–21, 2021–22
- Cupa României: 2008–09, 2009–10, 2024–25; runner-up: 2012–13
- Supercupa României: 2009, 2010, 2018, 2020; runner-up: 2012, 2019, 2021, 2022, 2025

Schalke 04

- DFB-Pokal: 2010–11

Rapid București

- Cupa României runner-up: 2011–12

Individual

- Gazeta Sporturilor Romanian Footballer of the Year runner-up: 2020; third place: 2022
- Liga I Team of the Season: 2019–20, 2020–21, 2021–22, 2022–23
- Liga I Most Assists: 2022–23, 2023–24
- Digi Sport Liga I Player of the Month: May 2014, March 2017
