= Rareș Bălan =

Romanian footballer

Personal information
- Full name: Rareș Cristian Bălan
- Date of birth: 19 January 2000 (age 26)
- Place of birth: Bistrița, Romania
- Height: 1.90 m (6 ft 3 in)
- Position: Defender

Youth career
- 2009–2018: Gloria Bistrița
- 2018–2020: CFR Cluj

Senior career*
Years	Team	Apps	(Gls)
2020–2024	CFR Cluj	3	(0)
2020–2022	CFR II Cluj	22	(1)
2020–2021	→ Gloria Bistrița (loan)	12	(1)
2023–2024	→ Gloria Bistrița-Năsăud (loan)	25	(6)
2024–2026	Tunari	13	(1)
- * Club domestic league appearances and goals as of 1 September 2025

Rareș Cristian Bălan (born 19 January 2000) is a Romanian professional footballer who plays as a defender.

== Club career ==
Bălan made his debut for CFR Cluj on 22 May 2022, in a 3–1 Liga I loss with FCSB.

== Honours ==
CFR Cluj

- Liga I: 2021–22
- Supercupa României runner-up: 2022

Gloria Bistrița

- Liga III: 2023–24

Tunari

- Liga III: 2024–25
