= Paulo Vinícius =

Paulo Vinícius may refer to:

- Paulo Vinícius (footballer, born 1984), Brazilian footballer
- Paulo Vinícius (footballer, born 1990), Brazilian-born Hungarian footballer
