= Karlo Bručić =

Croatian footballer

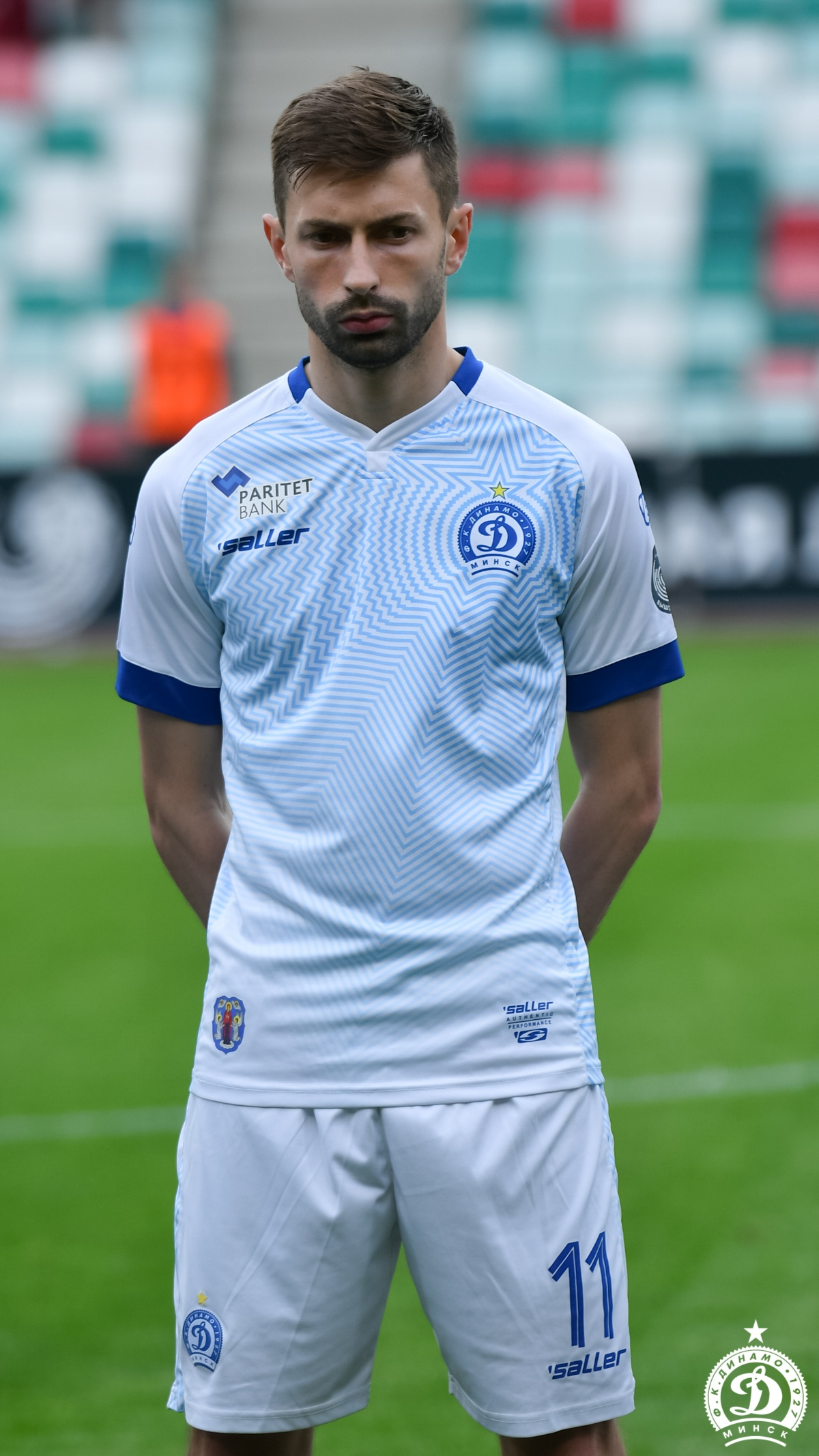

Personal information
- Date of birth: 17 April 1992 (age 34)
- Place of birth: Zagreb, Croatia
- Height: 1.83 m (6 ft 0 in)
- Positions: Left full-back; winger

Team information
- Current team: Bnei Sakhnin
- Number: 3

Youth career
- 2004–2010: Dinamo Zagreb

Senior career*
Years	Team	Apps	(Gls)
2010–2014	Dinamo Zagreb	0	(0)
2010–2011	→ Radnik Sesvete (loan)	21	(1)
2012–2014	→ Lokomotiva (loan)	62	(5)
2014–2016	Lokomotiva	56	(1)
2016–2019	Ashdod	73	(0)
2019	Sagan Tosu	5	(0)
2019	Sūduva	9	(2)
2020	Dinamo Minsk	12	(2)
2020–2021	Apollon Smyrnis	23	(0)
2021–2022	Koper	32	(1)
2022–2023	CFR Cluj	3	(0)
2023	Varaždin	11	(0)
2024	Koper	17	(0)
2024–2025	Maccabi Bnei Reineh	23	(0)
2025–	Bnei Sakhnin	29	(0)

International career
2007	Croatia U15	5	(0)
2008	Croatia U16	5	(0)
2008–2009	Croatia U17	5	(0)
2010	Croatia U18	1	(0)
2009–2011	Croatia U19	10	(0)
2011–2013	Croatia U20	7	(1)
2013	Croatia U21	4	(0)
- * Club domestic league appearances and goals as of 24 June 2026

Karlo Bručić (born 17 April 1992) is a Croatian professional footballer who plays as a left back for Bnei Sakhnin in the Israeli Premier League.

== Club career ==
A product of the GNK Dinamo Zagreb football academy, he was initially loaned to Radnik Sesvete for a season and has been constantly on loan to NK Lokomotiva since early 2012. He made his Prva HNL debut on 4 March 2012 against Rijeka. He made 7 league appearances that season and more than 20 the next season.

In September 2014, he switched from a loan to a full contract to NK Lokomotiva. During his spell at the club, he made 131 appearances and scored seven goals. On 2 July 2016, he switched to Israeli club Ashdod.

On 9 February 2019, Transferred to Japanese club Sagan Tosu. From September 2019 he is a member of Lithuanian FK Sūduva Marijampolė.

== International career ==
He has been capped at Croatia youth levels.

== Honours ==
Lokomotiva Zagreb

- Croatian Cup runner-up: 2012–13

Sūduva

- A Lyga: 2019
- Lithuanian Cup: 2019

Koper

- Slovenian Cup: 2021–22

CFR Cluj

- Supercupa României runner-up: 2022
