= Gabriel Debeljuh =

Croatian professional footballer

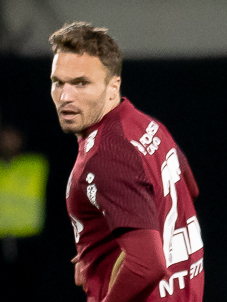
- Debeljuh with CFR Cluj in 2022

Personal information
- Full name: Gabriel Debeljuh
- Date of birth: 28 September 1996 (age 30)
- Place of birth: Pula, Croatia
- Height: 1.88 m (6 ft 2 in)
- Position: Forward

Team information
- Current team: Kauno Žalgiris
- Number: 27

Youth career
- 2010–2013: Rovinj
- 2013–2016: Torino

Senior career*
Years	Team	Apps	(Gls)
2016–2017	Piacenza	11	(0)
2017–2018	Mantova	30	(3)
2018–2019	Este	31	(11)
2019–2020	Hermannstadt	30	(12)
2020–2023	CFR Cluj	72	(24)
2023–2025	Sepsi OSK	42	(11)
2026	Oțelul Galați	15	(0)
2026–	Kauno Žalgiris	11	(4)
- * Club domestic league appearances and goals as of 8 November 2026

Gabriel Debeljuh (born 28 September 1996) is a Croatian professional footballer who plays as a forward for Toplyga club Kauno Žalgiris.

== Club career ==
Debeljuh started out as a senior in the Italian lower leagues with Piacenza Calcio, Mantova and A.C. Este respectively.

In summer 2019, Debeljuh signed for Romanian club Hermannstadt. After netting 12 times in the league and leading the club to a mid-table finish, he earned a transfer to defending champions CFR Cluj in 2020.

On 23 January 2026, the player transferred to Oțelul Galați in Liga I, signing a contract valid until 30 June 2026, with the option to extend it for another competitive year.

== Career statistics ==
As of 8 November 2026

Appearances and goals by club, season and competition
Club	Season	League			National cup (Note: Includes Coppa Italia Serie C, Coppa Italia Serie D, Cupa României)		Europe		Other		Total	
Club	Season	Division	Apps	Goals	Apps	Goals	Apps	Goals	Apps	Goals	Apps	Goals
Piacenza	2016–17	Lega Pro	11	0	1	0	—		—		12	0
Mantova	2017–18	Serie D	30	3	2	1	—		1 (Note: Appearances in Serie D promotion play-offs)	1	33	5
Este	2018–19	Serie D	31	11	1	1	—		—		32	12
Hermannstadt	2019–20	Liga I	30	12	2	1	—		—		32	13
CFR Cluj	2020–21	Liga I	32	8	1	0	9 (Note: One appearance and one goal in UEFA Champions League, eight appearances and two goals in UEFA Europa League)	3	1 (Note: Appearance in Supercupa României)	0	43	11
CFR Cluj	2021–22	Liga I	36	14	0	0	13 (Note: Five appearances and two goals in UEFA Champions League, two appearances and one goal in UEFA Europa League, six appearances and two goals in UEFA Europa Conference League)	5	1	0	50	19
CFR Cluj	2022–23	Liga I	4	2	0	0	6 (Note: Two appearances in UEFA Champions League, four appearances and one goal in UEFA Europa Conference League)	1	0	0	10	3
CFR Cluj	Total		72	24	1	0	28	9	2	0	103	33
Sepsi OSK	2023–24	Liga I	28	8	1	0	0	0	0	0	29	8
Sepsi OSK	2024–25	Liga I	14	3	0	0	—		—		14	3
Sepsi OSK	Total		42	11	1	0	0	0	0	0	43	11
Oțelul Galați	2025–26	Liga I	15	0	1	0	—		—		16	0
Kauno Žalgiris	2026	TOPLYGA	11	4	—		3 (Note: Appearances in UEFA Champions League)	1	—		14	5
Career total			241	65	9	3	31	10	3	1	284	79

== Honours ==
CFR Cluj

- Liga I: 2020–21, 2021–22
- Supercupa României: 2020

Sepsi OSK

- Supercupa României: 2023

Kauno Žalgiris

- Toplyga: 2026
- Lithuanian Cup: 2026
