= Gheorghe Gondiu =

Moldovan and Romanian footballer

Personal information
- Date of birth: 5 March 2002 (age 24)
- Place of birth: Chișinău, Moldova
- Height: 1.91 m (6 ft 3 in)
- Position: Forward

Team information
- Current team: Inter Sibiu
- Number: 28

Youth career
- –2019: Real Succes Chișinău
- 2019–2021: CFR Cluj

Senior career*
Years	Team	Apps	(Gls)
2021–2024	CFR Cluj	1	(0)
2022	→ Minaur Baia Mare (loan)	9	(3)
2022	→ CSM Sighetu Marmației (loan)	14	(7)
2023	→ Gloria Bistrița (loan)	12	(5)
2024–2025	CSM Olimpia Satu Mare		
2025–2026	Dumbrăvița	21	(6)
2026–	Inter Sibiu	0	(0)

International career
2018	Moldova U17	3	(0)
- * Club domestic league appearances and goals as of 8 September 2026

Gheorghe Gondiu (born 5 March 2002) is a Moldovan professional footballer who plays as a forward for Liga III club Inter Sibiu.

== Club career ==
He made his league debut on 25 May 2021 in Liga I match against FCSB.

== Honours ==
CFR Cluj

- Liga I: 2020–21
- Supercupa României: 2020

Minaur Baia Mare

- Liga III: 2021–22
