= Rareș Murariu =

Romanian footballer

Personal information
- Full name: Rareș Mihai Murariu
- Date of birth: 5 April 1999 (age 27)
- Place of birth: Mangalia, Romania
- Height: 1.97 m (6 ft 6 in)
- Position: Goalkeeper

Youth career
- –2009: Callatis Mangalia
- 2009–2019: Gheorghe Hagi Academy
- 2018–2019: ASU Politehnica Timișoara

Senior career*
Years	Team	Apps	(Gls)
2018–2024	Politehnica Timișoara	81	(0)
2020–2021	→ CFR Cluj (loan)	1	(0)
Total		82	(0)

International career
2015	Romania U16	1	(0)
2016	Romania U18	3	(0)
- * Club domestic league appearances and goals as of 13:24, 7 November 2024 (UTC)

Rareș Mihai Murariu (born 5 April 1999) is a Romanian professional footballer who plays as a goalkeeper.

== Club career ==
=== CFR Cluj ===
He made his league debut on 25 May 2021 in Liga I match against FCSB.

== Honours ==
CFR Cluj

- Liga I: 2020–21
- Supercupa României: 2020
