= Mario Rondón =

Venezuelan footballer (born 1986)

Personal information
- Full name: Mario Junior Rondón Fernández
- Date of birth: 26 March 1986 (age 40)
- Place of birth: Los Teques, Venezuela
- Height: 1.83 m (6 ft 0 in)
- Position: Striker

Youth career
- 1997–2004: Menor Los Castores
- 2004–2005: Pontassolense

Senior career*
Years	Team	Apps	(Gls)
2005–2009	Pontassolense	101	(21)
2009–2011	Paços Ferreira	31	(9)
2010	→ Beira-Mar (loan)	10	(1)
2011–2015	Nacional	108	(31)
2015–2016	Shijiazhuang Ever Bright	31	(6)
2018	Gaz Metan Mediaș	18	(9)
2018	Shijiazhuang Ever Bright	7	(3)
2019	Gaz Metan Mediaș	18	(10)
2019–2021	CFR Cluj	53	(7)
2021–2022	Radomiak	23	(1)
2022–2024	Sepsi OSK	59	(10)
2024–2025	Académica	12	(2)
Total		471	(110)

International career
2011–2015	Venezuela	13	(3)
- * Club domestic league appearances and goals

Mario Junior Rondón Fernández (Spanish pronunciation: [ˈmaɾjo ronˈdon]; born 26 March 1986) is a Venezuelan former professional footballer who played as a striker.

== Club career ==
Born in Los Teques, Miranda, Rondón arrived in Portugal at age 18, finishing his junior career with A.D. Pontassolense. He then proceeded to play a further four seasons with the third division club.

After scoring 11 goals in his last year, Rondón moved straight into the Primeira Liga after signing with F.C. Paços de Ferreira in May 2009. Rarely used in his debut season, he finished it on loan to Segunda Liga's S.C. Beira-Mar, featuring relatively as the Aveiro team returned to the top flight after a three-year absence.

Rondón returned to Paços for 2010–11. In the first game of the campaign, against Sporting CP on 14 August, he scored the only goal for a home win, eventually finishing as the side's top scorer with nine league goals and adding four in their runner-up run in the Taça da Liga (2–1 final loss to S.L. Benfica).

On 14 July 2011, Rondón joined C.D. Nacional on a five-year contract, for an undisclosed fee. He scored a career-best 12 goals in 30 games in his third year, helping the Madeirans to the playoff round of the UEFA Europa League.

On 28 February 2015, Rondón transferred to Chinese Super League newcomers Shijiazhuang Ever Bright FC. He scored the club's first-ever goal in the competition on 9 March, but in a 2–1 defeat at Guangzhou Evergrande FC.

In January 2018, after more than one year of inactivity, Rondón moved to Romania's CS Gaz Metan Mediaș for the remainder of the season. He made 21 appearances and netted ten times in all competitions, with fellow Liga I team CS Universitatea Craiova reportedly showing interest in signing the forward.

Rondón rejoined Shijiazhuang on 29 June 2018, aged 32. In May 2019, he signed a contract with Romanian champions CFR Cluj. He scored his first league goal for the latter on 23 February 2020 in a 2–0 away victory over Universitatea Craiova, adding another in the Europa League group stage against Stade Rennais F.C. (1–0 at home, where he was sent off after only three minutes on the pitch) to help his team to progress to the knockout stages.

== International career ==
Rondón earned his first cap for Venezuela on 25 March 2011, coming on as a 78th-minute substitute for Alejandro Moreno in a 2–0 friendly away win over Jamaica. He scored his first goal in another exhibition match, a 3–1 loss in South Korea on 5 September 2014.

== Career statistics ==
=== Club ===
Appearances and goals by club, season and competition
Club	Season	League			National cup (Note: Includes Taça de Portugal, Cupa României, Polish Cup)		League cup (Note: Includes Taça da Liga)		Continental		Other		Total	
Club	Season	Division	Apps	Goals	Apps	Goals	Apps	Goals	Apps	Goals	Apps	Goals	Apps	Goals
Pontassolense	2005–06	Segunda Divisão	17	2	1	0	—		—		—		18	2
Pontassolense	2006–07	Segunda Divisão	25	6	4	1	—		—		—		29	7
Pontassolense	2007–08	Segunda Divisão	29	2	1	0	—		—		—		30	2
Pontassolense	2008–09	Segunda Divisão	30	11	1	1	—		—		—		31	12
Pontassolense	Total		101	21	7	2	—		—		—		108	23
Paços Ferreira	2009–10	Primeira Liga	4	0	1	0	1	0	3 (Note: Appearances in UEFA Europa League)	0	—		9	0
Paços Ferreira	2010–11	Primeira Liga	27	9	1	0	6	4	—		—		34	13
Paços Ferreira	Total		31	9	2	0	7	4	3	0	—		43	13
Beira-Mar (loan)	2009–10	Segunda Liga	10	1	1	0	—		—		—		11	1
Nacional	2011–12	Primeira Liga	29	10	6	1	1	0	4	1	—		40	12
Nacional	2012–13	Primeira Liga	28	4	1	0	2	0	—		—		31	4
Nacional	2013–14	Primeira Liga	30	12	0	0	2	0	—		—		32	12
Nacional	2014–15	Primeira Liga	21	5	4	3	3	0	2	0	—		30	8
Nacional	Total		108	31	11	4	8	0	6	1	—		133	36
Shijiazhuang Ever Bright	2015	Chinese Super League	30	6	0	0	—		—		—		30	6
Shijiazhuang Ever Bright	2016	Chinese Super League	1	0	0	0	—		—		—		1	0
Shijiazhuang Ever Bright	Total		31	6	0	0	—		—		—		31	6
Gaz Metan Mediaș	2017–18	Liga I	18	9	3	1	—		—		—		21	10
Shijiazhuang Ever Bright	2018	China League One	7	3	—		—		—		—		7	3
Gaz Metan Mediaș	2018–19	Liga I	18	10	—		—		—		—		18	10
CFR Cluj	2019–20	Liga I	24	2	1	0	—		12 (Note: Eight appearances and two goals in UEFA Champions League, four appearances and one goal in UEFA Europa League)	3	0	0	37	5
CFR Cluj	2020–21	Liga I	29	5	1	0	—		10 (Note: Two appearances in UEFA Champions League, eight appearances and four goals in UEFA Europa League)	4	1 (Note: Appearance in Supercupa României)	0	41	9
CFR Cluj	Total		53	7	2	0	—		22	7	1	0	78	14
Radomiak	2021–22	Ekstraklasa	23	1	1	0	—		—		—		24	1
Sepsi OSK	2022–23	Liga I	40	9	5	2	—		4 (Note: Appearances in UEFA Europa Conference League)	0	1	1	50	12
Sepsi OSK	2023–24	Liga I	19	1	2	0	—		6	0	1	0	28	1
Sepsi OSK	Total		59	10	7	2	—		10	0	2	1	78	13
Académica	2024–25	Liga 3	12	2	0	0	—		—		—		12	2
Career total			471	110	33	9	15	4	41	8	3	1	563	132

=== International ===
Appearances and goals by national team and year
National team	Year	Apps	Goals
Venezuela
Venezuela	2011	1	0
Venezuela	2012	2	0
Venezuela	2013	1	0
Venezuela	2014	4	2
Venezuela	2015	5	1
Total		13	3

Scores and results list Venezuela's goal tally first, score column indicates score after each Rondón goal.

International goals by date, venue, opponent, score, result and competition
No.	Date	Venue	Opponent	Score	Result	Competition
1	5 September 2014	Bucheon Stadium, Bucheon, South Korea	South Korea	1–0	1–3	Friendly
2	9 September 2014	International Stadium, Yokohama, Japan	Japan	1–1	2–2	Friendly
3	12 November 2015	Estadio Hernando Siles, La Paz, Bolivia	Bolivia	1–2	2–4	2018 World Cup qualification

== Honours ==
Beira-Mar

- Segunda Liga: 2009–10

Paços de Ferreira

- Taça da Liga runner-up: 2010–11
- Supertaça Cândido de Oliveira runner-up: 2009

CFR Cluj

- Liga I: 2019–20, 2020–21
- Supercupa României: 2020

Sepsi OSK

- Cupa României: 2022–23
- Supercupa României: 2022, 2023
