= Denis Ciobotariu =

Romanian footballer (born 1998)

Personal information
- Date of birth: 10 June 1998 (age 28)
- Place of birth: Bucharest, Romania
- Height: 1.85 m (6 ft 1 in)
- Position: Defender

Team information
- Current team: Rapid București
- Number: 13

Youth career
- 2005–2017: Dinamo București

Senior career*
Years	Team	Apps	(Gls)
2017–2020	Dinamo București	34	(2)
2017–2018	→ Chindia Târgoviște (loan)	32	(2)
2020–2022	CFR Cluj	18	(1)
2022	→ Voluntari (loan)	13	(1)
2022–2025	Sepsi OSK	84	(5)
2025–	Rapid București	46	(5)

International career^{‡}
2016	Romania U18	1	(0)
2016–2017	Romania U19	6	(0)
2018–2021	Romania U21	7	(0)
2025–	Romania	1	(0)
- * Club domestic league appearances and goals as of 18 September 2026 ‡ National team caps and goals as of 24 March 2025

Denis Ciobotariu (born 10 June 1998) is a Romanian professional footballer who plays as a defender for Liga I club Rapid București.

== Club career ==
In 2017, Ciobotariu signed a contract with Dinamo București.

CFR Cluj reached an agreement with Dinamo in January 2020 to buy Ciobotariu for 150,000 euros.

He joined Rapid Bucureşti in January 2025.

== Personal life ==
He is the son of former Romanian international and current football coach Liviu Ciobotariu.

== Career statistics ==
=== Club ===
As of match played 27 October 2026

Appearances and goals by club, season and competition
Club	Season	League			Cupa României		Europe		Other		Total	
Club	Season	Division	Apps	Goals	Apps	Goals	Apps	Goals	Apps	Goals	Apps	Goals
Chindia Târgoviște (loan)	2017–18	Liga II	32	2	2	0	—		2 (Note: Appearances in Liga I promotion/relegation play-offs)	0	36	2
Dinamo București	2018–19	Liga I	16	0	2	0	—		—		18	0
Dinamo București	2019–20	Liga I	18	2	2	0	—		—		20	2
Dinamo București	Total		34	2	4	0	0	0	0	0	38	2
CFR Cluj	2019–20	Liga I	1	0	—		—		—		1	0
CFR Cluj	2020–21	Liga I	11	1	1	0	1 (Note: Appearance(s) in UEFA Europa League)	0	1 (Note: Appearance in Supercupa României)	0	14	1
CFR Cluj	2021–22	Liga I	6	0	1	0	2	0	—		9	0
CFR Cluj	Total		18	1	2	0	3	0	1	0	24	1
Voluntari (loan)	2021–22	Liga I	13	1	3	0	—		—		16	1
Sepsi OSK	2022–23	Liga I	28	2	5	0	2 (Note: Appearances in UEFA Europa Conference League)	0	0	0	35	2
Sepsi OSK	2023–24	Liga I	35	1	2	1	6	0	1	0	44	2
Sepsi OSK	2024–25	Liga I	21	2	0	0	—		—		21	2
Sepsi OSK	Total		84	5	7	1	8	0	1	0	100	6
Rapid Bucureşti	2024–25	Liga I	18	3	2	0	—		—		20	3
Rapid Bucureşti	2025–26	Liga I	22	2	3	0	—		—		25	2
Rapid Bucureşti	2026–27	Liga I	6	0	2	0	—		—		8	0
Rapid Bucureşti	Total		46	5	7	0	—		—		53	5
Career total			227	16	25	1	11	0	4	0	267	17

=== International ===
As of match played 24 March 2025

Appearances and goals by national team and year
National team	Year	Apps	Goals
Romania	2025	1	0
Total		1	0

== Honours ==
CFR Cluj

- Liga I: 2019–20, 2020–21, 2021–22
- Supercupa României: 2020

Voluntari

- Cupa României runner-up: 2021–22

Sepsi OSK

- Cupa României: 2022–23
- Supercupa României: 2022, 2023
