= Nicola Leone =

Italian computer scientist

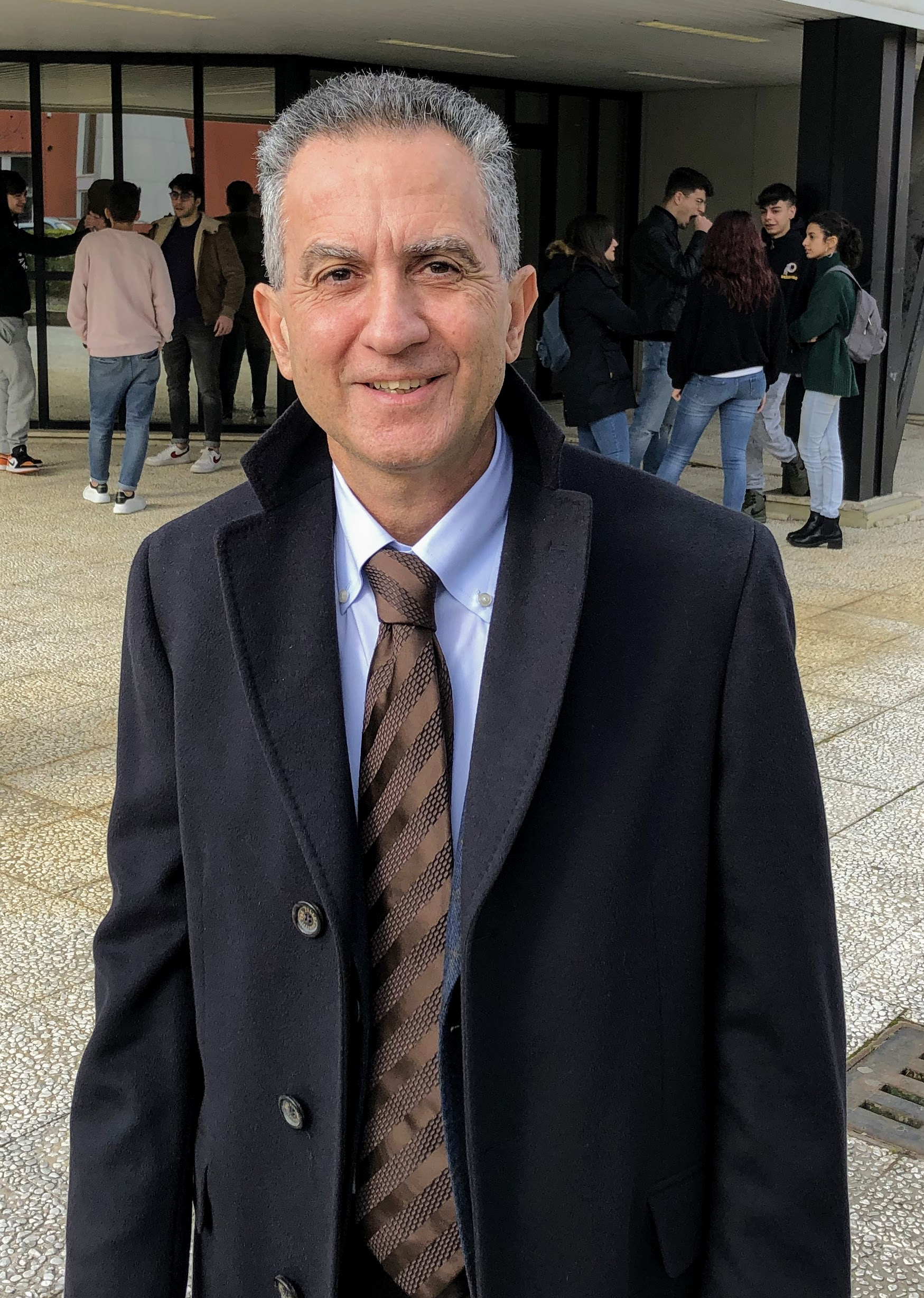
- Born: 28 February 1963 (age 63); Diamante, Italy
- Education: University of Calabria
- Awards: Academia Europaea; EurAI Fellow; ACM Test-of-Time Award (2009); ALP Test-of-Time Award (2018)
- Scientific career
- Fields: Artificial intelligence, knowledge representation and reasoning, and database theory
- Workplaces: University of Calabria; TU Wien
- Website: mat.unical.it/leone/wiki/HomePage

Nicola Leone is an Italian computer scientist who works in the areas of artificial intelligence, knowledge representation and reasoning, and database theory. Leone is a professor of computer science at the University of Calabria. He previously served as rector of the university and was earlier a professor of database systems at TU Wien.

== Research work ==
Leone has published more than 250 scientific articles in the areas of artificial intelligence, knowledge representation and reasoning, and database theory.

In the area of artificial intelligence and knowledge representation and reasoning, he is best known for his influential early work on answer set programming (ASP) and for the development of DLV, a pioneering system for knowledge representation and reasoning, which was the very first successful attempt to fully support disjunction in the datalog language, achieving the possibility to compute problems of high complexity, up to NP$^{NP}$.

To the field of database theory he mainly contributed through the invention of hypertree decomposition, a framework for obtaining tractable structural classes of conjunctive queries, and a generalisation of the notion of tree decomposition from graph theory. This work has also had substantial impact in artificial intelligence, since it is known that the problem of evaluating conjunctive queries on relational databases is equivalent to the constraint satisfaction problem

== Awards and honours ==
- Fellow of the European Coordinating Committee for Artificial Intelligence (EurAI).
- Member of the Academia Europaea.
- Honorary professor at the TU Wien.
- He won many Best-Paper award in logic programming conferences, and he was awarded two Test-of-Time Awards, by the Association for Computing Machinery (ACM) (2009), and by the Association for Logic Programming (2018).
