= Camora (footballer) =

Portuguese-Romanian footballer

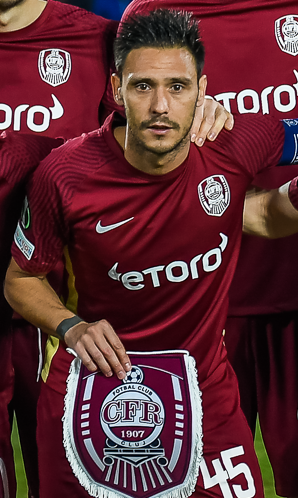
- Camora with CFR Cluj in 2023

Personal information
- Full name: Mário Jorge Malico Paulino
- Date of birth: 10 November 1986 (age 40)
- Place of birth: Samora Correia, Portugal
- Height: 1.77 m (5 ft 10 in)
- Positions: Left-back; midfielder

Team information
- Current team: CFR Cluj
- Number: 45

Youth career
- 1994–2005: Samora Correia

Senior career*
Years	Team	Apps	(Gls)
2005	Valdevez	10	(2)
2006–2009	Beira-Mar	24	(1)
2006	→ Avanca (loan)	4	(1)
2007	→ Pampilhosa (loan)	10	(1)
2009–2011	Naval	64	(2)
2011–	CFR Cluj	465	(15)

International career
2020–2023	Romania	10	(0)
- * Club domestic league appearances and goals as of 25 October 2026

Mário Jorge Malico Paulino (born 10 November 1986), known as Camora, is a professional footballer who plays as a left-back for Liga I club CFR Cluj, which he captains.

He spent most of his professional career at CFR Cluj in Romania, with which he won ten domestic trophies since signing in 2011. Previously, he totalled 66 matches in the Primeira Liga over four seasons, 64 of those with Naval.

Born in Portugal, Camora acquired Romanian citizenship in 2020 and began representing the national team later that year.

== Club career ==
=== Portugal ===
Camora was born in the city of Samora Correia, Benavente municipality, Santarém District. After beginning in amateur football, in January 2006 he signed with S.C. Beira-Mar in the Segunda Liga. He appeared rarely for the Aveiro-based team in his first years, also being loaned once; in the 2006–07 season he played two games with them in the Primeira Liga, suffering relegation.

In summer 2008, Camora joined Associação Naval 1º de Maio of the top tier, making his official debut for the club in the competition on 15 February 2009 by featuring 27 minutes in a 2–2 away draw against C.D. Trofense. After only eight matches in his first year, he went on to become an important first-team unit at the Figueira da Foz side.

Camora scored the first of two goals in the Portuguese top flight on 28 November 2009, opening an eventual 1–1 away draw against C.D. Nacional.

=== CFR Cluj ===
On 24 May 2011, following Naval's relegation, Camora moved abroad to Romania's CFR Cluj, where he joined several compatriots. He contributed one goal from 28 appearances in his debut campaign, as the club won the third Liga I championship in its history.

Camora became the player with the most league appearances for CFR on 17 April 2018, after surpassing Cadú's record of 202 matches. On 24 January 2019, it was announced that the captain had agreed to a three-year contract extension, at the same time expressing his desire to retire at the Stadionul Dr. Constantin Rădulescu and move permanently to Romania.

== International career ==
Camora earned his first cap for Romania on 8 October 2020, playing the entire 2–1 away loss to Iceland in the UEFA Euro 2020 qualifiers. In doing so, he reportedly became the oldest footballer to make his debut for the national team at the age of 33 years, 10 months and 28 days.

Camora appeared in a further nine internationals, his last being against Kosovo in the Euro 2024 qualifying phase. He suffered an injury early into the 0–0 draw in Pristina, but also surpassed Miodrag Belodedici and Lucian Sânmărtean to become the sixth oldest player in history to take the field for the country, at 36 years, seven months and six days.

== Personal life ==
Camora married a Romanian woman, Mirabela, with whom he has a son. On 24 August 2020, he obtained Romanian citizenship and became eligible to represent the national team.

== Career statistics ==
=== Club ===
As of match played on 28 October 2026

Appearances and goals by club, season and competition
Club	Season	League			National cup (Note: Includes Taça de Portugal, Cupa României)		League cup (Note: Includes Taça da Liga, Cupa Ligii)		Europe		Other		Total	
Club	Season	Division	Apps	Goals	Apps	Goals	Apps	Goals	Apps	Goals	Apps	Goals	Apps	Goals
Valdevez	2005–06	Segunda Divisão	10	2	0	0	—		—		—		10	2
Beira-Mar	2005–06	Segunda Liga	2	0	—		—		—		—		2	0
Beira-Mar	2006–07	Primeira Liga	2	0	0	0	—		—		—		2	0
Beira-Mar	2007–08	Segunda Liga	20	1	6	0	2	0	—		—		28	1
Beira-Mar	Total		24	1	6	0	2	0	—		—		32	1
Avanca (loan)	2006–07	Segunda Divisão	4	1	0	0	—		—		—		4	1
Pampilhosa (loan)	2006–07	Segunda Divisão	10	1	—		—		—		—		10	1
Naval	2008–09	Primeira Liga	8	0	0	0	0	0	—		—		8	0
Naval	2009–10	Primeira Liga	29	1	6	0	1	0	—		—		35	1
Naval	2010–11	Primeira Liga	27	1	1	0	3	0	—		—		31	1
Naval	Total		64	2	7	0	4	0	—		—		75	2
CFR Cluj	2011–12	Liga I	28	1	0	0	—		—		—		28	1
CFR Cluj	2012–13	Liga I	25	0	5	0	—		12 (Note: Ten appearances in UEFA Champions League, two appearances in UEFA Europa League)	0	1 (Note: Appearances in Supercupa României)	0	43	0
CFR Cluj	2013–14	Liga I	31	1	1	0	—		—		—		32	1
CFR Cluj	2014–15	Liga I	33	1	4	0	—		3 (Note: Appearances in UEFA Europa League)	0	—		40	1
CFR Cluj	2015–16	Liga I	37	2	6	0	2	0	—		—		45	2
CFR Cluj	2016–17	Liga I	24	0	3	0	1	0	—		1	0	29	0
CFR Cluj	2017–18	Liga I	30	1	0	0	—		—		—		30	1
CFR Cluj	2018–19	Liga I	32	1	4	0	—		6 (Note: Two appearances in UEFA Champions League, four appearances in UEFA Europa League)	0	1	0	43	1
CFR Cluj	2019–20	Liga I	29	2	0	0	—		16 (Note: Eight appearances in UEFA Champions League, eight appearances in UEFA Europa League)	0	1	0	46	2
CFR Cluj	2020–21	Liga I	35	0	0	0	—		10 (Note: Two appearances in UEFA Champions League, eight appearances in UEFA Europa League)	0	1	0	46	0
CFR Cluj	2021–22	Liga I	31	1	0	0	—		12 (Note: Five appearances in UEFA Champions League, two appearances in UEFA Europa League, five appearances in UEFA Conference League)	0	1	0	44	1
CFR Cluj	2022–23	Liga I	29	1	2	0	—		15 (Note: Two appearances in UEFA Champions League, thirteen appearances in UEFA Europa Conference League)	0	2 (Note: One appearance in Supercupa României, one appearance in Liga I European play-offs)	0	48	1
CFR Cluj	2023–24	Liga I	29	2	4	1	—		2 (Note: Appearances in UEFA Conference League)	0	—		35	3
CFR Cluj	2024–25	Liga I	26	0	5	0	—		6	0	—		37	0
CFR Cluj	2025–26	Liga I	34	1	3	0	—		8 (Note: Six appearances in UEFA Europa League, two appearances in UEFA Europa Conference League)	0	1	0	46	1
CFR Cluj	2026–27	Liga I	12	1	1	0	—		4	0	—		17	1
CFR Cluj	Total		465	15	38	1	3	0	94	0	9	0	609	16
Career total			577	22	51	1	9	0	94	0	9	0	740	23

=== International ===
Appearances and goals by national team and year
National team	Year	Apps	Goals
Romania	2020	2	0
Romania	2021	4	0
Romania	2022	3	0
Romania	2023	1	0
Total		10	0

== Honours ==
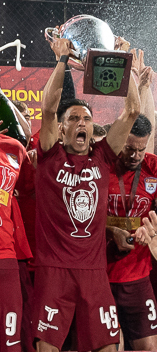
Camora celebrating the 2021–22 Liga I title

Beira-Mar

- Segunda Liga: 2005–06

CFR Cluj

- Liga I: 2011–12, 2017–18, 2018–19, 2019–20, 2020–21, 2021–22
- Cupa României: 2015–16, 2024–25
- Supercupa României: 2018, 2020

Individual

- Liga I Team of the Season: 2018–19
- Liga I Team of the Regular Season: 2018–19
- Liga I Team of the Championship Play-offs: 2018–19

Records

- CFR Cluj all-time appearance holder: 609
- CFR Cluj all-time Liga I appearance holder: 465
- Foreign player with the most appearances in Liga I: 465 (Note: Camora is the player born outside Romania with the most Liga I appearances, but holds Romanian citizenship and has earned international caps for the country.)
