= Cătălin Itu =

Romanian footballer

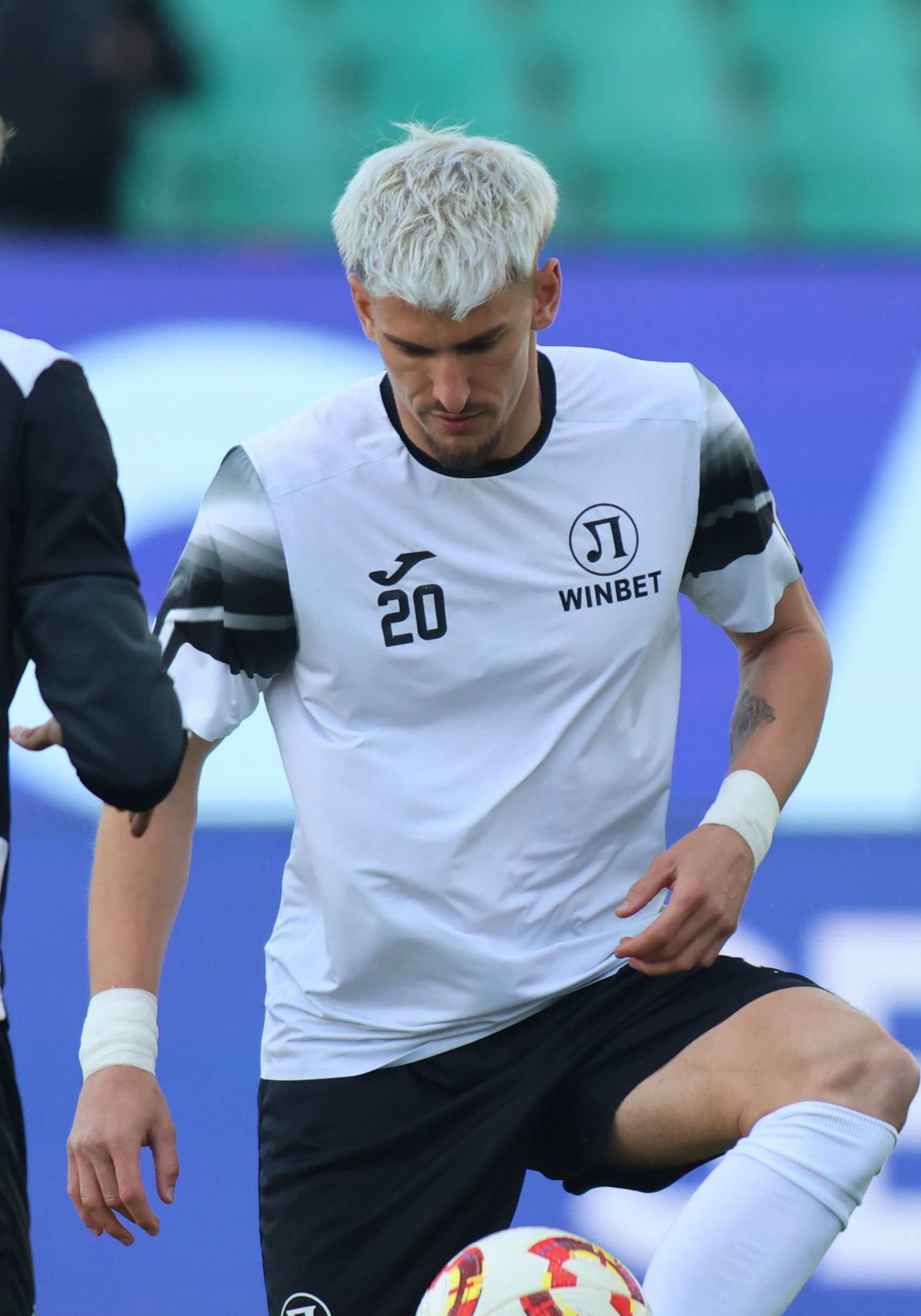

Personal information
- Full name: Cătălin Mihai Itu
- Date of birth: 26 October 1999 (age 27)
- Place of birth: Dej, Romania
- Height: 1.87 m (6 ft 2 in)
- Positions: Attacking midfielder; winger

Team information
- Current team: CSKA Sofia
- Number: 67

Youth career
- 2012–2016: Unirea Dej
- 2016–2017: Gheorghe Hagi Academy
- 2017–2018: Unirea Dej
- 2018–2019: CFR Cluj

Senior career*
Years	Team	Apps	(Gls)
2019–2023	CFR Cluj	61	(7)
2021	→ Dinamo București (loan)	13	(0)
2023	→ Politehnica Iași (loan)	12	(2)
2023–2024	Politehnica Iași	23	(1)
2025	Krumovgrad	17	(3)
2025–2026	Lokomotiv Plovdiv	34	(3)
2026–	CSKA Sofia	4	(0)

International career
2019–2021	Romania U21	7	(0)
- * Club domestic league appearances and goals as of 19:11, 11 October 2026 (UTC)

Cătălin Mihai Itu (born 26 October 1999) is a Romanian professional footballer who plays as a midfielder for Bulgarian First League club CSKA Sofia.

== Club career ==
Itu made his debut in the Liga I for CFR Cluj on 19 May 2019, in a 1–0 loss to FCSB. In January 2025, he signed a contract with Bulgarian First League club Krumovgrad.

== Career statistics ==
=== Club ===
As of 22 October 2026

Appearances and goals by club, season and competition
Club	Season	League			National cup (Note: Includes Cupa României, Bulgarian Cup)		Europe		Other		Total	
Club	Season	Division	Apps	Goals	Apps	Goals	Apps	Goals	Apps	Goals	Apps	Goals
CFR Cluj	2018–19	Liga I	1	0	0	0	0	0	0	0	1	0
CFR Cluj	2019–20	Liga I	33	4	0	0	0	0	1 (Note: Appearance in Supercupa României)	0	34	4
CFR Cluj	2020–21	Liga I	24	3	0	0	5 (Note: Two appearances in UEFA Champions League, three appearances in UEFA Europa League)	0	0	0	29	3
CFR Cluj	2021–22	Liga I	3	0	–		1 (Note: Appearances in UEFA Europa League)	0	0	0	4	0
CFR Cluj	2022–23	Liga I	0	0	0	0	0	0	0	0	0	0
CFR Cluj	Total		61	7	0	0	6	0	1	0	68	7
Dinamo București (loan)	2021–22	Liga I	13	0	2	0	–		–		15	0
Politehnica Iași (loan)	2022–23	Liga II	12	2	–		–		–		12	2
Politehnica Iași	2023–24	Liga I	17	1	1	0	–		–		18	1
Politehnica Iași	2024–25	Liga I	6	0	2	0	–		–		8	0
Politehnica Iași	Total		35	3	3	0	0	0	0	0	38	3
Krumovgrad	2024–25	Bulgarian First League	17	3	–		–		–		17	3
Lokomotiv Plovdiv	2025–26	Bulgarian First League	30	3	5	4	–		1 (Note: Appearances in Bulgarian First League European play-offs)	0	36	7
Lokomotiv Plovdiv	2026–27	Bulgarian First League	4	0	–		–		–		4	0
Lokomotiv Plovdiv	Total		34	3	5	4	0	0	1	0	40	7
CSKA Sofia	2026–27	Bulgarian First League	4	0	0	0	4	0	1 (Note: Appearance in Bulgarian Supercup)	0	9	0
Career Total			164	16	10	4	10	0	3	0	187	20

== Honours ==
CFR Cluj

- Liga I: 2018–19, 2019–20, 2020–21, 2021–22
- Supercupa României: 2020

Politehnica Iași

- Liga II: 2022–23

Lokomotiv Plovdiv

- Bulgarian Cup runner-up: 2025–26

CSKA Sofia

- Bulgarian Supercup: 2026
