= Rareș Ispas =

Romanian footballer

Personal information
- Full name: Rareș Sebastian Ispas
- Date of birth: 26 August 2000 (age 26)
- Place of birth: Cluj-Napoca, Romania
- Height: 1.78 m (5 ft 10 in)
- Position: Left-back

Youth career
- –2019: CFR Cluj

Senior career*
Years	Team	Apps	(Gls)
2019–2022	CFR Cluj	0	(0)
2020	→ CSM Reșița (loan)	2	(0)
2020–2021	→ Comuna Recea (loan)	26	(0)
2021–2022	→ Sepsi OSK (loan)	26	(0)
2022–2023	Sepsi OSK	20	(0)
2023–2026	Politehnica Iași	57	(1)

International career
2018–2019	Romania U19	3	(0)
2021–2022	Romania U21	2	(0)
- * Club domestic league appearances and goals as of 18 May 2025

Rareș Sebastian Ispas (born 26 August 2000) is a Romanian professional footballer who plays as a left-back.

== Club career ==
He made his Liga I debut for Sepsi OSK against Academica Clinceni on 16 July 2021.

== Honours ==
Sepsi OSK

- Cupa României: 2021–22, 2022–23
- Supercupa României: 2022
