= Adrian Gîdea =

Romanian footballer

Personal information
- Full name: Adrian Mihai Gîdea
- Date of birth: 13 March 2000 (age 26)
- Place of birth: Drobeta-Turnu Severin, Romania
- Height: 1.80 m (5 ft 11 in)
- Position: Midfielder

Team information
- Current team: Crișul Sântandrei

Youth career
- –2017: CSȘ Drobeta Turnu Severin
- 2017–2018: Centrul de Excelență Timișoara
- 2018–2020: CFR Cluj

Senior career*
Years	Team	Apps	(Gls)
2020–2023	CFR Cluj	33	(1)
2023	→ Politehnica Timișoara (loan)	9	(2)
2023	CSM Alexandria	10	(1)
2024–2026	Bihor Oradea	18	(2)
2026–	Crișul Sântandrei	0	(0)
- * Club domestic league appearances and goals as of 11 February 2026

Adrian Mihai Gîdea (born 13 March 2000) is a Romanian professional footballer who plays as a midfielder for Liga II club Crișul Sântandrei.

== Club career ==
Gîdea made his debut for CFR Cluj on 22 December 2020, in a 0–0 Liga I draw with U Craiova. He registered his first Liga I goal on 25 May, in a 2–0 home win with FCSB.

== Honours ==
Bihor Oradea

- Liga III: 2023–24

== Career statistics ==
As of match played 1 November 2024

Appearances and goals by club, season and competition
Club	Season	League			Cupa României		Europe		Other		Total	
Club	Season	Division	Apps	Goals	Apps	Goals	Apps	Goals	Apps	Goals	Apps	Goals
CFR Cluj	2020–21	Liga I	21	1	0	0	0	0	1 (Note: Appearance in Supercupa României)	0	22	1
CFR Cluj	2021–22	Liga I	8	0	1	0	1 (Note: Appearance in UEFA Europa Conference League)	0	0	0	10	0
CFR Cluj	2022–23	Liga I	4	0	1	0	0	0	1	0	6	0
CFR Cluj	Total		33	1	2	0	1	0	2	0	38	1
ASU Politehnica Timișoara (loan)	2022–23	Liga II	9	2	—		—		—		9	2
CSM Alexandria	2023–24	Liga II	10	1	5	2	—		—		15	3
Bihor Oradea	2023–24	Liga III	11	1	—		—		4 (Note: Appearances in Liga III promotion play-offs)	2	15	3
Bihor Oradea	2024–25	Liga II	7	1	1	0	—		—		8	1
Bihor Oradea	2025–26	Liga II	0	0	0	0	—		—		0	0
Bihor Oradea	Total		18	2	1	0	—		4	2	23	4
Crișul Sântandrei	2025–26	Liga III	0	0	—		—		—		0	0
Career total			70	6	8	2	1	0	6	2	85	10

== Honours ==
CFR Cluj

- Liga I: 2020–21, 2021–22
- Supercupa României: 2020
