= Mickaël Pereira =

Portuguese footballer (born 1991)

Personal information
- Full name: Mickaël Pereira
- Date of birth: 28 September 1991 (age 35)
- Place of birth: Grenoble, France
- Height: 1.79 m (5 ft 10 in)
- Position: Midfielder

Youth career
- 2001–2003: Limianos
- 2003–2004: Vitorino das Donas
- 2004–2006: Sporting CP
- 2006: Limianos
- 2007–2008: Vianense
- 2008–2010: Rio Ave

Senior career*
Years	Team	Apps	(Gls)
2010–2015	Limianos	116	(9)
2015–2016	Olhanense	9	(0)
2016–2017	Vilaverdense	28	(0)
2017–2023	Limianos	113	(5)
2023–2024	Forjães	20	(1)
2024–2025	Valenciano	21	(0)
- * Club domestic league appearances and goals as of 22:56, 29 December 2025 (UTC)

Mickaël Pereira (born 28 September 1991) is a professional footballer who plays as a midfielder.
