= Claudiu Petrila =

Romanian footballer (born 2000)

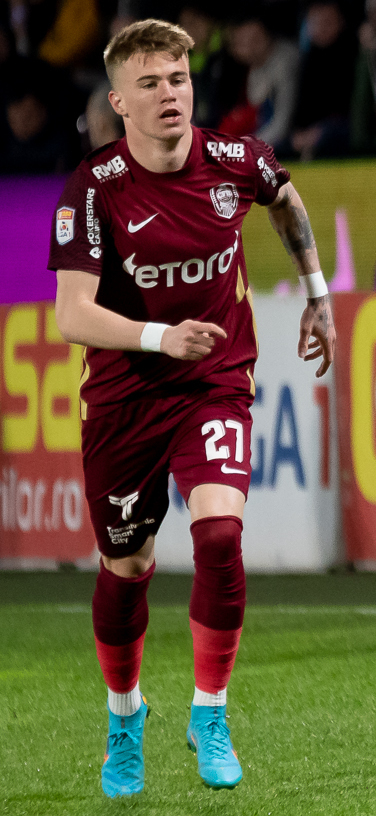
- Petrila with CFR Cluj in 2022

Personal information
- Full name: Claudiu Adrian Mihai Petrila
- Date of birth: 7 November 2000 (age 26)
- Place of birth: Sânnicolau Român, Romania
- Height: 1.76 m (5 ft 9 in)
- Positions: Winger; attacking midfielder

Team information
- Current team: Rapid București
- Number: 10

Youth career
- 2011–2015: LPS Bihorul Oradea
- 2015–2016: → Hidișelu de Sus (loan)
- 2016–2018: CFR Cluj

Senior career*
Years	Team	Apps	(Gls)
2018–2024	CFR Cluj	95	(13)
2020–2021	→ Sepsi OSK (loan)	25	(5)
2023–2024	→ Rapid București (loan)	13	(4)
2024–	Rapid București	93	(15)

International career^{‡}
2018–2019	Romania U19	7	(3)
2020–2023	Romania U21	13	(0)
2022–	Romania	2	(0)
- * Club domestic league appearances and goals as of 7 November 2026 ‡ National team caps and goals as of 18 November 2025

Claudiu Adrian Mihai Petrila (born 7 November 2000) is a Romanian professional footballer who plays as a winger or an attacking midfielder for Liga I club Rapid București and the Romania national team.

== Club career ==
Born in Sânnicolau Român, Bihor County, Petrila started his football career with LPS Bihorul Oradea. At age 14, he was loaned out along with other players from his age group to fourth division side FC Hidișelu de Sus, where he debuted as a senior. He then had an unsuccessful trial with Sampdoria in Italy, before moving to the academy of Liga I club CFR Cluj.

On 8 December 2018, manager Toni Conceição handed 18-year-old Petrila his professional debut for CFR in a 2–2 league draw with Gaz Metan Mediaș. He scored his first goal on 23 August 2020, in a 2–1 away victory over Academica Clinceni. After making six appearances in the 2020–21 Liga I, he was sent on loan to Sepsi OSK for the remainder of the season, where he totalled five goals from 26 games in all competitions.

Upon his return in Cluj-Napoca in July 2021, he netted in the consecutive 3–2 and 2–1 league wins over FC U Craiova and Academica Clinceni, respectively. On 30 September 2021, Petrila scored his first European goal in a 1–1 draw with Danish club Randers in the UEFA Europa Conference League group stage.

== Style of play ==
Petrila can play as an attacking midfielder or a winger on either flank. He has been acknowledged for his pace and dribbling skills.

== Career statistics ==
=== Club ===
As of match played 7 November 2026

Appearances and goals by club, season and competition
Club	Season	League			Cupa României		Europe		Other		Total	
Club	Season	Division	Apps	Goals	Apps	Goals	Apps	Goals	Apps	Goals	Apps	Goals
CFR Cluj	2018–19	Liga I	5	0	1	0	—		—		6	0
CFR Cluj	2019–20	Liga I	15	0	1	0	0	0	1 (Note: Appearance in Supercupa României)	0	17	0
CFR Cluj	2020–21	Liga I	6	1	0	0	0	0	—		6	1
CFR Cluj	2021–22	Liga I	31	9	0	0	9 (Note: Three appearances in UEFA Champions League, two appearances in UEFA Europa League, four appearances and one goal in UEFA Europa Conference League)	1	1	0	41	10
CFR Cluj	2022–23	Liga I	38	3	3	0	15 (Note: Two appearances and one goal in UEFA Champions League, thirteen appearances in UEFA Europa Conference League)	1	2 (Note: One appearance in Supercupa României, one appearance in Liga I European play-offs)	0	58	4
CFR Cluj	Total		95	13	5	0	24	2	4	0	128	15
Sepsi OSK (loan)	2020–21	Liga I	25	5	1	0	—		—		26	5
Rapid București (loan)	2023–24	Liga I	28	6	1	0	—		—		29	6
Rapid București	2024–25	Liga I	35	8	3	0	—		—		38	8
Rapid București	2025–26	Liga I	34	4	2	1	—		—		36	5
Rapid București	2026–27	Liga I	9	1	1	0	—		—		10	1
Rapid București	Total		106	19	7	1	—		—		113	20
Career total			226	37	13	1	24	2	4	0	267	40

=== International ===
As of match played 18 November 2025

Appearances and goals by national team and year
National team	Year	Apps	Goals
Romania
Romania	2022	1	0
Romania	2025	1	0
Total		2	0

== Honours ==
CFR Cluj

- Liga I: 2018–19, 2019–20, 2020–21, 2021–22
- Supercupa României: 2020; runner-up: 2019, 2021, 2022

Individual

- Gala Fotbalului Românesc Romanian Young Footballer of the Year: 2021
