= Syam Ben Youssef =

Footballer (born 1989)

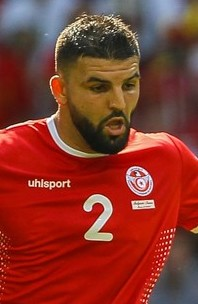
- Ben Youssef with Tunisia at the 2018 FIFA World Cup

Personal information
- Full name: Sham Habib Ben Youssef
- Date of birth: 31 March 1989 (age 37)
- Place of birth: Marseille, France
- Height: 1.89 m (6 ft 2 in)
- Position: Centre-back

Youth career
- 1995–2007: US Traminots Marseille
- 2007–2008: Bastia

Senior career*
Years	Team	Apps	(Gls)
2008–2009	Bastia	4	(0)
2009–2011	ES Tunis	27	(3)
2011–2012	Leyton Orient	9	(0)
2012–2015	Astra Giurgiu	67	(3)
2015–2017	Caen	35	(3)
2015–2016	Caen B	5	(2)
2017–2019	Kasımpaşa	73	(4)
2020	Denizlispor	4	(0)
2020–2021	CFR Cluj	7	(0)
2022	Beroe	13	(0)
2022	Quevilly-Rouen B	1	(0)
2022–2023	Quevilly-Rouen	27	(1)
2023–2024	Caen	4	(0)
Total		276	(16)

International career^{‡}
2008–2009	Tunisia U20	8	(0)
2010–2019	Tunisia	48	(2)
- * Club domestic league appearances and goals as of 11 June 2024 ‡ National team caps and goals as of 17 July 2019

Syam Habib Ben Youssef (Tunisian Arabic: صيام الحبيب بن يوسف; born 31 March 1989) is a former professional footballer who played as a centre-back. Born in France, he played for the Tunisia national team from 2010 to 2019, scoring two goals in forty-eight caps.

== Club career ==
=== Bastia ===
Born in Marseille, Ben Youssef passed by the Union sportif des traminots Marseille and the training center of SC Bastia.

=== ES Tunis ===
He joined ES Tunis on a two-year contract on 12 August 2009, he made his professional debut in the Tunisian championship on 12 September 2009, against CS Sfaxien (4–0) at Stade 7 November, and scored his first goal. On 14 December, he received his first convocation with the national team.

=== Leyton Orient ===
In 2012 Ben Youssef played for English club Leyton Orient,

=== Astra Giurgiu ===
He signed to Astra Giurgiu in Romania, where he remained three seasons, won 2013–14 Cupa României and discovered European competitions.

=== Caen ===
On 29 June 2015, free of any contract with the Romanian club, Ben Youssef committed for three seasons to Caen, he played his first match in Ligue 1 on 22 August against OGC Nice. He scored his first goal in the fifth day against Troyes AC.

=== Kasımpaşa ===
On 5 July 2017, he agreed with Caen to cancel his contract and joined the Turkish club Kasımpaşa for three seasons.

=== Denizlispor ===
Ben Youssef moved to Turkish club Denizlispor in 2020.

=== CFR Cluj ===
On 4 November 2020, Ben Youssef joined Romanian club CFR Cluj.

=== Beroe ===
In February 2022, Ben Youssef signed with Bulgarian First League club Beroe. He left Beroe at the end of the season.

=== Return to Caen ===
On 1 July 2023, Ben Youssef returned to Caen, signing a one-year contract with the club.

== International career ==
With the Tunisia Ben Youssef started in 2013. He played his first African Cup in 2015, he participated also in 2017 Africa Cup of Nations.

On 17 November 2015, he scored his first goal with the Tunisian team in the second round of the 2018 World Cup qualification against Mauritania.

In June 2018 he was named in Tunisia’s 23-man squad for the 2018 FIFA World Cup in Russia.

== Career statistics ==
As of 17 July 2019

Appearances and goals by national team and year
National team	Year	Apps	Goals
Tunisia	2013	2	0
Tunisia	2014	9	0
Tunisia	2015	12	1
Tunisia	2016	4	0
Tunisia	2017	12	0
Tunisia	2018	7	0
Tunisia	2019	2	1
Total		48	2

Scores and results list Tunisia's goal tally first, score column indicates score after each Ben Youssef goal.

List of international goals scored by Syam Ben Youssef
No.	Date	Venue	Opponent	Score	Result	Competition
1	17 November 2015	Stade Olympique de Radès, Radès, Tunisia	Mauritania	1–0	2–1	2018 FIFA World Cup qualification
2	22 March 2019	Stade Olympique de Radès, Radès, Tunisia	Eswatini	1–0	4–0	2019 Africa Cup of Nations qualification

== Honours ==
ES Tunis

- CAF Champions League: 2011
- Tunisian Ligue 1: 2009–10, 2010–11
- Tunisian Cup: 2010–11

Astra Giurgiu

- Cupa României: 2013–14
- Supercupa României: 2014

CFR Cluj

- Liga I: 2020–21
- Supercupa României: 2020
