= Sergiu Robert Ciocan =

Romanian footballer

Sergiu Ciocan
Personal information
- Full name: Sergiu Robert Ciocan
- Date of birth: 22 September 1998 (age 28)
- Place of birth: Baia Mare, Romania
- Height: 1.73 m (5 ft 8 in)
- Position: Midfielder

Team information
- Current team: Minaur Baia Mare
- Number: 7

Youth career
- –2017: LPS Satu Mare

Senior career*
Years	Team	Apps	(Gls)
2017–2020	Comuna Recea	75	(40)
2019–2020	→ Gaz Metan Mediaș (loan)	13	(0)
2020–2022	Gaz Metan Mediaș	22	(2)
2021–2022	→ Minaur Baia Mare (loan)	28	(10)
2022–2023	Minaur Baia Mare	16	(3)
2023	Unirea Dej	15	(0)
2024	FC Bihor	7	(1)
2024–	Minaur Baia Mare	0	(0)
- * Club domestic league appearances and goals as of 08:06, 30 October 2024 (UTC)

Sergiu Robert Ciocan (born 22 September 1998) is a Romanian professional footballer who plays as a midfielder for Liga III club Minaur Baia Mare.

== Honours ==
Minaur Baia Mare

- Liga III: 2021–22

FC Bihor Oradea

- Liga III: 2023–24
