= William Soares (footballer, born 1988) =

Brazilian footballer

Personal information
- Full name: William Soares da Silva
- Date of birth: 30 December 1988 (age 37)
- Place of birth: Goiânia, Brazil
- Height: 1.83 m (6 ft 0 in)
- Position: Defensive midfielder

Youth career
- 2007–2009: Vila Nova

Senior career*
Years	Team	Apps	(Gls)
2009–2010	Vila Nova	10	(0)
2009	→ Canedense (loan)		
2010–2013	Porto	0	(0)
2010–2011	→ Portimonense (loan)	21	(0)
2011	→ Recreativo (loan)	0	(0)
2012–2013	→ Arouca (loan)	12	(0)
2013–2014	Rio Ave	0	(0)
2013–2014	→ Arouca (loan)	35	(1)
2014–2016	União Madeira	68	(3)
2016–2018	Cova da Piedade	70	(0)
2018–2019	Arouca	18	(0)
2019–2020	Gil Vicente	6	(0)
2020–2021	CFR Cluj	16	(0)
- * Club domestic league appearances and goals

William Soares da Silva (born 30 December 1988), sometimes known as just Soares, is a Brazilian former professional footballer who plays as a defensive midfielder.

== Career ==
=== Vila Nova ===
Born in Goiânia, Goiás, Soares joined Vila Nova Futebol Clube's youth system in 2007. After two years with Vila Nova's reserves, he made his debut on 29 September 2009, against Juventude.

=== Porto and loan to Portimonense ===
After two season in the first team, Soares was moved to Porto, and then loaned to Portimonense. An investor used a proxy club, Grêmio Esportivo Anápolis, and retained 20% economic rights on the future transfer fee received by Porto. Porto had an option to purchase it on or before 30 June 2013.

=== Recreativo (loan) ===
In the following season, Soares was loaned again, this time to Recreativo de Huelva in the Spanish second level.

=== Gil Vicente ===
On 23 May 2019, Gil Vicente announced the signing of Soares on a one-year deal.

=== CFR Cluj ===
On 19 October 2020, Soares joined Romanian club CFR Cluj.

== Honours ==
CFR Cluj

- Liga I: 2020–21
- Supercupa României: 2020
