= 2020 Supercupa României =

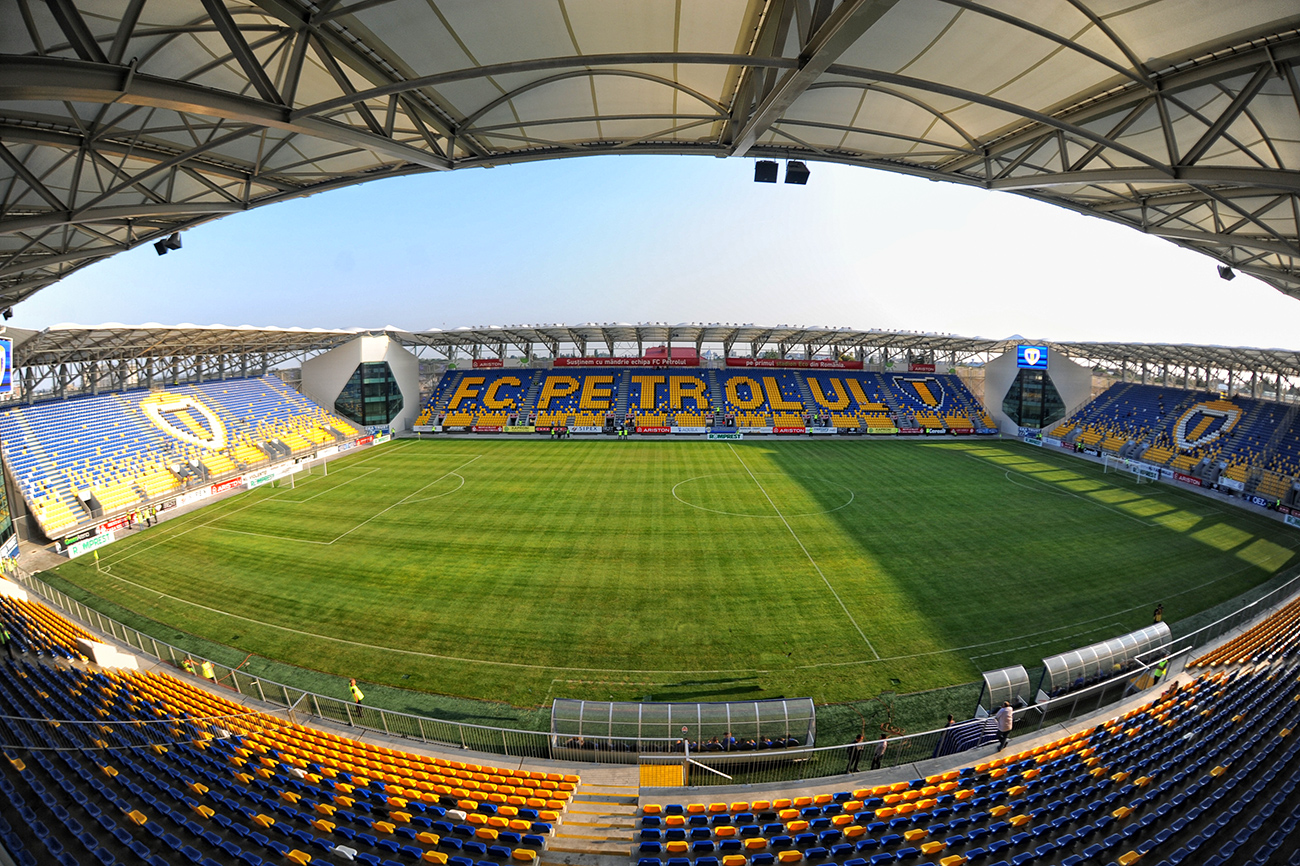
- The Ilie Oană Stadium in Ploiești hosted the match
- Event: 2020 Supercupa României
CFR Cluj	FCSB
Liga I	Cupa României
0	0
- CFR Cluj won 4–1 on penalties
- Date: 15 April 2021
- Venue: Ilie Oană, Ploiești
- Man of the Match: Andrei Vlad
- Referee: Radu Petrescu
- Attendance: 0 (Note: The match was played behind closed doors due to the COVID-19 pandemic in Romania.)
- Weather: Clear

The 2020 Supercupa României was the 22nd edition of the Supercupa României, an annual football super cup contested by the winners of the previous season's Liga I and Cupa României competitions. Because of the COVID-19 pandemic, the match was postponed until 15 April 2021.

The game featured CFR Cluj and FCSB, and the Ilie Oană Stadium in Ploiești hosted the competition for a second consecutive year. CFR Cluj claimed its fourth trophy after a 4–1 victory at the penalty shoot-out.

== Teams ==
Team	Qualification	Previous participations (bold indicates winners)
CFR Cluj	Winners of the 2019–20 Liga I	6 (**2009**, **2010**, 2012, 2016, **2018**, 2019)
FCSB	Winners of the 2019–20 Cupa României	11 (**1994**, **1995**, **1998**, 1999, **2001**, 2005, **2006**, 2011, **2013**, 2014, 2015)

== Venue ==
On 18 March 2021, Romanian Football Federation president Răzvan Burleanu announced that the match would be played on 15 April, at the Ilie Oană Stadium in Ploiești.

== Match ==
=== Details ===
15 April 2021
19:00 EEST (UTC+03)

CFR Cluj	0–0	FCSB
	Report 1 Report 2
Penalties
Rondón (penalty scored); Chipciu (penalty scored); Păun (penalty scored); Camora (penalty scored)	4–1	(penalty scored) Radunović; (penalty missed) Perianu; (penalty missed) Șut

Ilie Oană Stadium, Ploiești
Attendance: 0
Referee: Radu Petrescu

**CFR Cluj**	**FCSB**

GK	87	(Lithuania) Giedrius Arlauskis
RB	4	(Romania) Cristian Manea		(substituted off) 72'
CB	15	(Tunisia) Syam Ben Youssef
CB	3	(Romania) Andrei Burcă
LB	45	(Portugal) Camora (c)
RCM	5	(Brazil) Soares		(substituted off) 83'
CM	28	(Romania) Ovidiu Hoban
LCM	75	(Romania) Adrian Gîdea		(substituted off) 8'
RW	10	(Romania) Ciprian Deac	(yellow card) 50'
CF	22	(Croatia) Gabriel Debeljuh	(yellow card) 30'	(substituted off) 72'
LW	18	(Romania) Valentin Costache		(substituted off) 72'
Substitutes:
LCM	99	(Venezuela) Mario Rondón		(substituted on) 8'
CM	13	(Romania) Denis Ciobotariu		(substituted on) 72'
RB	7	(Romania) Adrian Păun		(substituted on) 72'
CF	27	(Romania) Alexandru Chipciu		(substituted on) 72'
RCM	8	(Iceland) Rúnar Már Sigurjónsson		(substituted on) 83'
Manager:
(Romania) Edward Iordănescu

GK	99	(Romania) Andrei Vlad
RB	23	(Romania) Ovidiu Popescu
CB	16	(Romania) Dragoș Nedelcu	(yellow card) 84'
CB	6	(Romania) Denis Haruț
LB	3	(Romania) Ionuț Panțîru
RCM	11	(Romania) Olimpiu Moruțan		(substituted off) 46'
CM	26	(Romania) Răzvan Oaidă		(substituted off) 46'
LCM	5	(Romania) Gabriel Simion
RW	20	(Romania) Ionuț Vînă		(substituted off) 46'
CF	10	(Romania) Florin Tănase (c)		(substituted off) 46'
LW	37	(Romania) Octavian Popescu		(substituted off) 46'
Substitutes:
CM	2	(Romania) Valentin Crețu		(substituted on) 46'
RCM	89	(Romania) Adrian Șut		(substituted on) 46'
LW	25	(Romania) Ovidiu Perianu		(substituted on) 46'
CF	31	(Romania) Andrei Istrate		(substituted on) 46'
RW	33	(Montenegro) Risto Radunović	(yellow card) 51'	(substituted on) 46'
Manager:
(Romania) Anton Petrea

**MAN OF THE MATCH**

- (Romania) Andrei Vlad

**MATCH OFFICIALS**

- Assistant referees:
  - Mircea Grigoriu
  - Mihai Marica
- Fourth official:
  - Iulian Dima
- Additional assistant referees:

**MATCH RULES**

- 90 minutes.
- Penalty shoot-out if scores still level.
- Nine named substitutes.
- Maximum of five substitutions.

=== Statistics ===
Overall
Statistic	CFR Cluj	FCSB
Goals scored	0	0
Total shots	14	4
Shots on target	6	1
Ball possession	52%	48%
Corner kicks	7	1
Fouls committed	13	13
Offsides	1	3
Yellow cards	2	2
Red cards	0	0

== Post-match ==
Edward Iordănescu claimed his second trophy as a manager—His first was also the Supercupa României, which he won during his first spell at CFR Cluj in 2019.

FCSB goalkeeper Andrei Vlad was named player of the match, on the eve of his 22nd birthday.

== See also ==
- 2020–21 Liga I
- 2020–21 Cupa României
