= 2023–24 FC Rapid București season =

FC Rapid București
2023–24 season
- Owner: Dan Sucu, Victor Angelescu
- Chairman: Daniel Niculae
- Manager: Neil Lennon
- Stadium: Superbet Arena
- Liga I: 3rd
- Cupa României: Group stage
- Top goalscorer: League: Albion Rrahmani (9); All: Albion Rrahmani (9)
- Highest home attendance: 12,499 (vs Petrolul Ploiesti)
- Lowest home attendance: 10,644 (vs FC Botosani)
- Average home league attendance: 11,974
- Biggest win: 4–0 (vs Dinamo Bucuresti)
- Biggest defeat: 0–2 (vs Petrolul Ploiesti)
- All statistics correct as of 1 September 2023.

The 2023–24 FC Rapid București season is the club's 101st season in existence and the second consecutive season in the top flight of Romanian football. In addition to the domestic league, FC Rapid București are participating in this season's edition of the Cupa României. The season covers the period from 1 July 2023 to 30 June 2024.

== Players ==
=== First-team squad ===
As of 1 September 2023

Note: Flags indicate national team as defined under FIFA eligibility rules; some limited exceptions apply. Players may hold more than one non-FIFA nationality.

No.	Pos.	Nation	Player
4	MF	EST	Mattias Käit
6	DF	ROU	Paul Iacob
7	FW	NGR	Funsho Bamgboye
9	FW	KOS	Albion Rrahmani
10	MF	ROU	Alexandru Ioniță
11	MF	ESP	Borja Valle
15	DF	ROU	Iulian Cristea
17	MF	ROU	Ștefan Pănoiu
19	DF	ROU	Răzvan Onea
21	DF	ROU	Dragoș Grigore (3rd captain)
22	DF	ROU	Cristian Săpunaru (Captain)
23	MF	ROU	Alexandru Albu
24	DF	ROU	Andrei Borza
25	MF	BEL	Xian Emmers

No.	Pos.	Nation	Player
26	MF	ROU	Răzvan Oaidă
27	FW	ROU	Claudiu Petrila (on loan from CFR Cluj)
29	MF	ROU	Gabriel Gheorghe
30	FW	ROU	Alex Stan
31	GK	ROU	Horațiu Moldovan
32	DF	ROU	Robert Badescu
47	DF	GER	Christopher Braun
70	MF	ROU	Eduard Danaila
80	MF	ROU	Catalin Cirjan (on loan from Arsenal)
90	GK	ROU	Virgil Drăghia (Vice-captain)
91	MF	ROU	Omar El Sawy
93	FW	CMR	Kevin Soni
96	MF	FRA	Jayson Papeau
99	GK	ROU	Bogdan Ungureanu

=== Out on loan ===
Note: Flags indicate national team as defined under FIFA eligibility rules; some limited exceptions apply. Players may hold more than one non-FIFA nationality.

No.	Pos.	Nation	Player
—	GK	ROU	Codrut Stan (to LPS Clinceni)
—	DF	ROU	Cristian Ignat (to CS Mioveni)
—	MF	ROU	David Iordache (to Cetatea Turnu Magurele)

No.	Pos.	Nation	Player
—	MF	ROU	Andrei Ciobanu (to Poli Iasi)
—	MF	ROU	Alexandru Crivac (to Progresul Spartac)
—	FW	ROU	Claudiu Micovschi (to UTA Arad)

== Transfers ==
=== In ===
No.	Pos.	Player	Transferred from	Fee	Date
	MF	(Romania) Catalin Cirjan	(England) Arsenal	Loan fee	1 July 2023
	MF	(Spain) Borja Valle	(Spain) Cartagena	Free Transfer	1 July 2023
	MF	(Romania) Răzvan Oaidă	(Romania) FCSB	Free Transfer	1 July 2023
	DF	(Romania) Iulian Cristea	(Romania) FCSB	Free Transfer	1 July 2023
	DF	(Germany) Christopher Braun	(Romania) CFR Cluj	€150,000	1 July 2023
	MF	(Romania) Omar El Sawy	(Romania) Csikszereda	€400,000	1 July 2023
	FW	(Romania) Claudiu Petrila	(Romania) CFR Cluj	Loan fee €500,000	31 July 2023
	FW	(Romania) Claudiu Micovschi	(Italy) Avellino	Free Transfer	3 August 2023
	FW	(Kosovo) Albion Rrahmani	(Kosovo) Ballkani	€600,000	7 August 2023
	DF	(Romania) Andrei Borza	(Romania) Farul Constanta	€800,000	15 August 2023
	FW	(Cameroon) Kevin Soni	Free Agent	Free Transfer	12 September 2023

=== Out ===
No.	Pos.	Player	Transferred to	Fee	Date
	FW	(Morocco) Younes Bnou Marzouk	Free Agent	Release	1 July 2023
	FW	(Netherlands) Kevin Luckassen	Free Agent	Release	1 July 2023
	MF	(France) Hervin Ongenda	Free Agent	Release	1 July 2023
	DF	(Romania) Alin Demici	(Romania) CS Dinamo Bucuresti	Free Transfer	1 July 2023
	FW	(Romania) Alexandru Despa	(Romania) CS Tunari	Free Transfer	1 July 2023
	DF	(France) Damien Dussaut	(Romania) Farul Constanta	Free Transfer	1 July 2023
	FW	(Romania) Albert Stahl	(Romania) UTA Arad	Free Transfer	1 July 2023
	MF	(Croatia) Ljuban Crepulja	(Romania) FC Voluntari	Free Transfer	1 July 2023
	FW	(Romania) Antonio Sefer	(Israel) Hapoel Be'er Sheva	€500,000	1 July 2023
	MF	(Romania) Andrei Ciobanu	(Romania) Poli Iasi	Loan Transfer	26 July 2023
	DF	(Romania) Claudiu Belu	(Romania) Poli Iasi	Free Transfer	27 July 2023
	DF	(Romania) Cristian Ignat	(Romania) CS Mioveni	Loan Transfer	10 August 2023
	MF	(Romania) Alexandru Crivac	(Romania) Progresul Spartac	Loan Transfer	17 August 2023
	FW	(Romania) Valentin Costache	(Cyprus) Apollon Limassol	€100,000	22 August 2023
	FW	(Romania) Claudiu Micovschi	(Romania) UTA Arad	Loan Transfer	30 August 2023
	DF	(Romania) Florin Ștefan	(Romania) Sepsi OSK	Free Transfer	4 September 2023
	FW	(Croatia) Marko Dugandzic	(Saudi Arabia) Al-Tai	€2,000,000	7 September 2023
	DF	(Brazil) Junior Morais	(Turkey) Gaziantep	Free Transfer	9 September 2023

=== Overall transfer activity ===
==== Expenditure ====
Summer:▼€2,450,000

Winter:▼

Total:▼€2,450,000

==== Income ====
Summer: ▲€2,600,000

Winter: ▲

Total:▲€2,600,000

==== Net totals ====
Summer: ▲€150,000

Winter:

Total: ▲€150,000

== Pre-season and friendlies ==
Win Draw Loss Fixtures

28 June 2022 Friendly	DAC Streda (Slovakia)	1–1	(Romania) Rapid București
12:00 CEST (UTC+2)	Spyros Risvanis(38')		Paul Iacob(90')

1 July 2022 Friendly	Gyor (Hungary)	0–1	(Romania) Rapid București
12:00 CEST (UTC+2)			Marko Dugandzic(30')

3 July 2022 Friendly	Rača (Slovakia)	0–5	(Romania) Rapid București
18:00 CEST (UTC+2)			Xian Emmers(4'), Funsho Bamgboye(43'), Mattias Kait(73'), Paul Iacob(77'), Marko Dugandzic(87')

== Competitions ==
=== Overview ===
Competition	First match	Last match	Starting round	Record							
Competition	First match	Last match	Starting round	Pld	W	D	L	GF	GA	GD	Win %
Liga I	14 July 2023	May 2024	Matchday 1	8	4	2	2	18	10	+8	50.00
Cupa României			Group stage	0	0	0	0	0	0	+0	—
Total				8	4	2	2	18	10	+8	50.00

Last updated: 1 September 2023
Source: Soccerway

=== Liga I ===
==== League table ====
Pos	Team	Pld	W	D	L	GF	GA	GD	Pts	Qualification
1	FCSB	30	19	7	4	53	28	+25	64	Qualification to play-off round
2	Rapid București	30	15	10	5	55	32	+23	55	Qualification to play-off round
3	CFR Cluj	30	15	8	7	54	29	+25	53	Qualification to play-off round
4	Universitatea Craiova	30	13	10	7	47	38	+9	49	Qualification to play-off round
5	Farul Constanța	30	11	10	9	37	38	−1	43 (Note: Head to head points: Farul Constanța 6, Sepsi OSK 0)	Qualification to play-off round

Source: , Soccerway
Rules for classification: 1) Points; 2) Head-to-head points; 3) Head-to-head goal difference; 4) Head-to-head goals scored; 5) Goal difference; 6) Goals scored; 7) Play-off.
Notes:

Pos	Team	Pld	W	D	L	GF	GA	GD	Pts	Qualification	FCS	CFR	UCV	FAR	SEP	RAP
1	FCSB (C)	10	5	2	3	12	11	+1	49	Qualification to Champions League first qualifying round		0–1	2–0	2–1	2–1	2–2
2	CFR Cluj	10	6	1	3	19	14	+5	46	Qualification to Conference League second qualifying round	0–1		1–2	5–1	2–1	3–2
3	Universitatea Craiova (O)	10	6	1	3	18	14	+4	44	Qualification to European competition play-offs	2–0	0–1		1–2	3–2	2–1
4	Farul Constanța	10	4	2	4	19	20	−1	36		0–1	5–1	3–3		1–4	3–1
5	Sepsi OSK	10	3	3	4	17	17	0	34		2–2	1–1	1–3	1–1		3–2
6	Rapid București	10	1	1	8	13	22	−9	32		2–0	1–4	1–2	1–2	0–1	

Source: Soccerway, FRF (in Romanian), LPF (in Romanian)
Legend: Blue = home team win; Yellow = draw; Red = away team win.
Rules for classification: 1) Points; 2) Points without rounding; 3) Points in the regular season; 4) Head-to-head points; 5) Head-to-head goal difference; 6) Head-to-head goals scored; 7) Goal difference; 8) Goals scored; 9) Play-off (only if needed to decide champion or teams for UEFA competitions). (Note: only criteria 7 and 8 are applied to establish the classification during the competition.)
(C) Champions; (O) Play-off winners

Pos	Team	Pld	W	D	L	GF	GA	GD	Pts	Qualification or relegation	UTA	OTE	HER	UCJ	PET	IAS	DIN	BOT	VOL	FCU
7	UTA Arad (Note: UTA Arad and Hermannstadt were ineligible to advance to the European competition play-offs because they did not receive a UEFA licence.)	9	5	2	2	15	11	+4	37			3–1	1–3					1–0	4–3	3–1
8	Oțelul Galați	9	6	1	2	11	7	+4	36	Qualification to European competition play-offs			1–0	1–0		1–0	1–0	2–0		
9	Hermannstadt	9	4	2	3	13	7	+6	34					1–1	2–0	0–1	3–0	1–1		
10	Universitatea Cluj	9	3	3	3	12	10	+2	33	Qualification to European competition play-offs	0–0				1–2	1–0	3–3	3–0		
11	Petrolul Ploiești	9	3	2	4	8	14	−6	29		1–1	2–1						1–2	0–4	1–0
12	Politehnica Iași	9	3	1	5	7	8	−1	27		0–2				2–0				3–1	0–0
13	Dinamo București (O)	9	2	4	3	10	12	−2	25	Qualification to relegation play-offs	2–0				1–1	1–0			1–1	
14	Botoșani (O)	9	4	2	3	11	11	0	25	Qualification to relegation play-offs						2–1	2–1		0–0	4–1
15	Voluntari (R)	9	2	4	3	11	10	+1	24	Relegation to Liga II		1–1	1–0	0–1						0–0
16	FCU 1948 Craiova (R)	9	1	3	5	8	16	−8	22	Relegation to Liga II		1–2	1–3	3–2			1–1			

Source: Soccerway, FRF (in Romanian), LPF (in Romanian)
Legend: Blue = home team win; Yellow = draw; Red = away team win.
Rules for classification: 1) Points; 2) Points without rounding; 3) Points in the regular season; 4) Head-to-head points; 5) Head-to-head goal difference; 6) Head-to-head goals scored; 7) Goal difference; 8) Goals scored; 9) Play-off (only if needed to decide teams for relegation). (Note: only criteria 7 and 8 are applied to establish the classification during the competition.)
(O) Play-off winners; (R) Relegated

==== Results summary ====
Overall								Home						Away					
Pld	W	D	L	GF	GA	GD	Pts	W	D	L	GF	GA	GD	W	D	L	GF	GA	GD
8	4	2	2	18	10	+8	14	2	2	1	9	5	+4	2	0	1	9	5	+4

Source: Liga 1

==== Results by round ====
Round	1	2	3	4	5	6	7	8
Ground	H	A	H	A	H	H	A	H
Result	D	W	D	L	L	W	W	W
Position	11	4	7	8	11	7	5	3

Source: Liga 1
A = Away; H = Home; W = Win; D = Draw; L = Loss

==== Matches ====
The league fixtures were announced on 1 July 2023.

=== Cupa României ===
==== Group stage ====
2023 1	v	TBD
--:-- EET (UTC+2)

2023 2	v	TBD
--:-- EET (UTC+2)

2023 3	v	TBD
--:-- EET (UTC+2)
