= 2022–23 FC Rapid București season =

FC Rapid București
2022–23 season
- Chairman: Daniel Niculae
- Manager: Adrian Mutu
- Stadium: Superbet Arena
- Liga I: 5th
- Cupa României: Group stage
- Top goalscorer: League: Marko Dugandžić (15); All: Marko Dugandžić (15)
Home colours	Away colours	Third colours
- All statistics correct as of 18 December 2022.

The 2022–23 FC Rapid București season is the club's 100th season in existence and the second consecutive season in the top flight of Romanian football. In addition to the domestic league, FC Rapid București are participating in this season's edition of the Cupa României.. The season covers the period from 1 July 2022 to 30 June 2023.

== Players ==
=== First-team squad ===
As of 8 September 2022

Note: Flags indicate national team as defined under FIFA eligibility rules; some limited exceptions apply. Players may hold more than one non-FIFA nationality.

No.	Pos.	Nation	Player
1	GK	ROU	Codruț Sandu
3	DF	ROU	Florin Ștefan
4	MF	CRO	Ljuban Crepulja
5	DF	ROU	Cristian Ignat
6	DF	ROU	Paul Iacob
7	MF	ROU	Antonio Sefer
8	MF	ROU	Andrei Ciobanu
9	MF	ROU	Valentin Costache
10	MF	ROU	Alexandru Ioniță
11	FW	ROU	Andrei Ioniță
13	DF	BRA	Júnior Morais
14	MF	EST	Mattias Käit
15	DF	MTQ	Damien Dussaut
16	FW	ROU	Alexandru Despa
17	MF	ROU	Ștefan Pănoiu
18	MF	ROU	David Iordache
19	DF	ROU	Răzvan Onea

No.	Pos.	Nation	Player
21	DF	ROU	Dragoș Grigore (3rd captain)
22	DF	ROU	Cristian Săpunaru (Captain)
23	MF	ROU	Alexandru Albu
25	MF	BEL	Xian Emmers
26	MF	ROU	Alexandru Crivac
28	MF	ROU	Alexandru Mățan (on loan from Columbus)
29	MF	ROU	Gabriel Gheorghe
30	FW	ROU	Alex Stan
31	GK	ROU	Horațiu Moldovan
42	FW	NED	Kevin Luckassen
45	FW	CRO	Marko Dugandžić
57	FW	MAR	Younes Marzouk
71	FW	SVK	Jakub Vojtuš
77	DF	ROU	Claudiu Belu
90	GK	ROU	Virgil Drăghia (Vice-captain)
96	MF	FRA	Jayson Papeau
99	GK	ROU	Bogdan Ungureanu

=== Out on loan ===
Note: Flags indicate national team as defined under FIFA eligibility rules; some limited exceptions apply. Players may hold more than one non-FIFA nationality.

No.	Pos.	Nation	Player
—	GK	ROU	Ștefan Lefter (to Corvinul Hunedoara)
—	GK	ROU	Valentin Mărgărit (to Progresul Spartac)
—	GK	ROU	Sebastian Micu (to FC Brașov)
—	DF	ROU	Alexandru Catrici (to Tunari)
—	DF	ROU	Enrichi Finica (to Politehnica Iași)
—	MF	ROU	Antonio Bradu (to Corvinul Hunedoara)
—	MF	ROU	Alin Demici (to Dinamo București)

No.	Pos.	Nation	Player
—	MF	MDA	Cazimir Drăgan (to Metaloglobus București)
—	MF	ROU	Luca Florică (to Progresul Spartac)
—	MF	ROU	Alexandru Gheorghe (to Metaloglobus București)
—	MF	ROU	Rareș Lazăr (to FC Brașov)
—	MF	ROU	Albert Stahl (to UTA Arad)
—	MF	ROU	Mario Tunsu (to Tunari)
—	FW	ROU	Daniel Dicianu (to Râmnicu Sărat)

== Pre-season and friendlies ==
Win Draw Loss Fixtures

29 June 2022 Friendly	St. Pölten (Austria)	3–2	(Romania) Rapid București	St. Pölten, Austria
18:30 CEST (UTC+2)				Stadium: Stadtsportanlage

1 July 2022 Friendly	Cracovia (Poland)	1–2	(Romania) Rapid București	Grein, Austria
11:00 CEST (UTC+2)				Stadium: Sportplatz Grein TSV Stadion

2 July 2022 Friendly	LASK (Austria)	2–0	(Romania) Rapid București	Ulmerfeld, Austria
17:00 CEST (UTC+2)				Stadium: Peter Lisec Stadion

5 July 2022 Friendly	Rapid București (Romania)	1–7	(Czech Republic) Slavia Prague	Oepping, Austria
18:00 CEST (UTC+2)				Stadium: Sportplatz Oepping

20 November 2022 Friendly	Brașov Steagul Renaște (Romania)	0–1	(Romania) Rapid București	Braşov, Romania
11:00 EET (UTC+2)				Stadium: Stadionul Tineretului

7 January 2023 Friendly	Rapid București (Romania)	3–2	(Turkey) Sarıyer	Lara, Turkey
17:00 TRT (UTC+3)		Report		Stadium: Miracle Resort Hotel

10 January 2023 Friendly	Rapid București (Romania)	3–1	(Hungary) Kecskeméti TE	Belek, Turkey
11:30 TRT (UTC+3)		Report		Stadium: Bellis Hotel Sports Center

13 January 2023 Friendly	Sigma Olomouc (Czech Republic)	2–0	(Romania) Rapid București	Belek, Turkey
15:00 TRT (UTC+3)		Report		Stadium: S&B Sport Football Complex

== Competitions ==
=== Overview ===
Competition	First match	Last match	Starting round	Record							
Competition	First match	Last match	Starting round	Pld	W	D	L	GF	GA	GD	Win %
Liga I	16 July 2022	May 2023	Matchday 1	0	0	0	0	0	0	+0	—
Cupa României	18 October 2022		Group stage	0	0	0	0	0	0	+0	—
Total				0	0	0	0	0	0	+0	—

Last updated: 18 December 2022
Source: Soccerway

=== Liga I ===
==== Results summary ====
Overall								Home						Away					
Pld	W	D	L	GF	GA	GD	Pts	W	D	L	GF	GA	GD	W	D	L	GF	GA	GD
0	0	0	0	0	0	0	0	0	0	0	0	0	0	0	0	0	0	0	0

Source: Liga 1

==== Results by round ====
Round	1
Ground	
Result	
Position	

Source: Liga 1
A = Away; H = Home; W = Win; D = Draw; L = Loss

==== Regular season ====
===== Table =====
Pos	Team	Pld	W	D	L	GF	GA	GD	Pts	Qualification
3	FCSB	30	17	6	7	51	35	+16	57	Qualification for the Play-off round
4	Universitatea Craiova	30	16	6	8	37	27	+10	54	Qualification for the Play-off round
5	Rapid București	30	15	7	8	40	26	+14	52	Qualification for the Play-off round
6	Sepsi OSK	30	11	9	10	47	30	+17	42	Qualification for the Play-off round
7	FCU 1948 Craiova	30	11	7	12	34	33	+1	40	Qualification for the Play-out round

Source: LPF (in Romanian) Soccerway
Rules for classification: 1) Points; 2) Head-to-head points; 3) Head-to-head goal difference; 4) Head-to-head goals scored; 5) Goal difference; 6) Goals scored; 7) Play-off.

===== Matches =====
The league fixtures were announced on 1 July 2022.

16 July 2022 1	CFR Cluj	1–0	Rapid București	Cluj-Napoca
21:30 EEST (UTC+3)	Matias 17'			Stadium: Stadionul Dr. Constantin Rădulescu

24 July 2022 2	Rapid București	2–0	FCSB	Bucharest
21:30 EEST (UTC+3)	Dugandžić 19', (yellow card) 59'; Săpunaru (yellow card) 24', (goal) 40'; Moldovan (yellow card) 58'; Crepulja (yellow card) 79'	Report	Radunović (yellow card) 57'; Cordea (yellow card) 81'; Oct. Popescu (yellow card) 88'	Stadium: Superbet Arena-Giulești; Referee: István Kovács

31 July 2022 3	Universitatea Craiova	0–1	Rapid București	Craiova
20:15 EEST (UTC+3)		Report	Ioniță 51'	Stadium: Stadionul Ion Oblemenco; Referee: Horațiu Feșnic

6 August 2022 4	Rapid București	2–1	Argeș Pitești	Bucharest
21:45 EEST (UTC+3)	Sefer 45', 64'	Report	Käit 90+2' (o.g.)	Stadium: Superbet Arena-Giulești; Referee: Ionuţ Coza

6 August 2022 5	Petrolul Ploiești	1–0	Rapid București	Ploiești
21:45 EEST (UTC+3)	Grozav 23'; Cioiu (yellow card) 56'	Report	Săpunaru (yellow card) 21'; Käit (yellow card) 52'; Ioniță (yellow card) 71'; Iacob (yellow card) 75'	Stadium: Stadionul Ilie Oană; Referee: Cătălin Popa

20 August 2022 6	Rapid București	1–0	UTA Arad	Bucharest
21:30 EEST (UTC+3)	Júnior Morais 17'	Report		Stadium: Superbet Arena-Giulești; Referee: Iulian Călin

27 August 2022 7	Sepsi OSK	1–2	Rapid București	Sfântu Gheorghe
21:45 EEST (UTC+3)	Rondón 21' (pen.)	Report	Sefer 27'; Ioniță 45+2'	Stadium: Sepsi Arena Stadium; Referee: Andrei Chivulete

30 August 2022 8	Rapid București	1–0	Universitatea Cluj	Bucharest
22:00 EEST (UTC+3)	Dugandžić 80' (pen.)	Report		Stadium: Superbet Arena-Giulești; Referee: George Găman

3 September 2022 9	Voluntari	0–1	Rapid București	Voluntari
21:45 EEST (UTC+3)		Report	Dugandžić 60'	Stadium: Stadionul Anghel Iordănescu; Referee: Sebastian Colțescu

10 September 2022 10	FC U Craiova 1948	1–0	Rapid București	Târgu Jiu
21:30 EEST (UTC+3)	Sidibe 55'	Report		Stadium: Stadionul Constantina Diță-Tomescu; Referee: Marian Barbu

17 September 2022 11	Rapid București	2–1	Mioveni	Bucharest
21:30 EEST (UTC+3)	Sefer 39'; Luckassen 87'	Report	Scarlatache 22'	Stadium: Superbet Arena-Giulești; Referee: Horia Mladinovici

3 October 2022 12	Chindia Târgoviște	2–1	Rapid București	Ploiești
21:00 EEST (UTC+3)	D. Popa 15'; Neguț 56'	Report	Sefer 59'	Stadium: Stadionul Ilie Oană; Referee: Lucian Rusandu

8 October 2022 13	Rapid București	1–1	Botoșani	Bucharest
21:30 EEST (UTC+3)	Júnior Morais 83'	Report	Țigănașu 38'	Stadium: Superbet Arena-Giulești; Referee: Adrian Cojocaru

14 October 2022 14	Hermannstadt	0–2	Rapid București	Mediaș
21:00 EEST (UTC+3)		Report	Emmers 75'; Grigore 78'	Stadium: Stadionul Municipal Gaz Metan; Referee: Andrei Chivulete

21 October 2022 15	Rapid București	1–1	Farul Constanța	Bucharest
20:30 EEST (UTC+3)	Săpunaru 53'	Report	Alibec 19'	Stadium: Superbet Arena-Giulești; Referee: István Kovács

30 October 2022 16	Rapid București	2–1	CFR Cluj	Bucharest
21:00 EET (UTC+2)	Săpunaru 36' (pen.); Dugandžić 71' (pen.)	Report	Muhar 54'	Stadium: Superbet Arena-Giulești; Referee: Cătălin Popa

6 November 2022 17	FCSB	3–1	Rapid București	Bucharest
21:00 EET (UTC+2)	Cordea 14'; Compagno 29'; Oct. Popescu 57'; V. Crețu (yellow card) 74'	Report	Júnior Morais (yellow card) 68' (red card) 70'; Dugandžić 76' (pen.)	Stadium: Arena Națională; Referee: Sebastian Colțescu

12 November 2022 18	Rapid București	2–2	Universitatea Craiova	Bucharest
20:30 EET (UTC+2)	Albu 24'; Dugandžić 72'	Report	A. Crețu 4'; Baiaram 19'	Stadium: Superbet Arena-Giulești; Referee: Adrian Cojocaru

4 December 2022 19	Argeș Pitești	1–1	Rapid București	Pitești
19:00 EET (UTC+2)	Șerban 60'	Report	Pănoiu 2'	Stadium: Stadionul Nicolae Dobrin; Referee: Radu Petrescu

14 December 2022 20	Rapid București	3–1	Petrolul Ploiești	Bucharest
19:00 EET (UTC+2)	Dugandžić 9' (pen.), 73'; Ioniță (penalty missed) 36'; Crepulja (yellow card) 39'; Käit (yellow card) 53'; Pănoiu 90+4'	Report	Jair (penalty missed) 40'; Huja (yellow card) 46'; Grozav 61'	Stadium: Arena Națională; Referee: Sebastian Colțescu

18 December 2022 21	UTA Arad	1–1	Rapid București	Arad
20:30 EET (UTC+2)	Otele 40'	Report	Dugandžić 90+7' (pen.)	Stadium: Stadionul Francisc von Neuman; Referee: Marcel Bîrsan

20 January 2023 22	Rapid București	3–0	Sepsi OSK	Bucharest
20:00 EET (UTC+2)	Dugandžić 5', 13', 19' (pen.), 28'	Report	Matei (yellow card) 20'; Păun (yellow card) 40'	Stadium: Superbet Arena-Giulești; Referee: Horațiu Feșnic

27 January 2023 23	Universitatea Cluj	0–0	Rapid București	Cluj-Napoca
20:00 EET (UTC+2)		Report		Stadium: Cluj Arena; Referee: Marian Barbu

4 February 2023 24	Rapid București	4–1	Voluntari	Bucharest
20:00 EET (UTC+2)	Dugandžić 19', 55', 82'; Júnior Morais (yellow card) 25'; Albu 43'	Report	Ricardinho (yellow card) 51'; Lopes 90+1'	Stadium: Superbet Arena-Giulești; Referee: George Găman

10 February 2023 25	Rapid București	1–2	FC U Craiova 1948	Bucharest
20:00 EET (UTC+2)	Iacob (yellow card) 53', (goal) 87'; Sefer (yellow card) 81'	Report	Bauza 1'; Bahassa 57'	Stadium: Superbet Arena-Giulești; Referee: Cătălin Popa

17 February 2023 26	Mioveni	0–0	Rapid București	Mioveni
20:00 EET (UTC+2)		Report		Stadium: Stadionul Orășenesc; Referee: Horațiu Feșnic

25 February 2023 27	Rapid București	2–0	Chindia Târgoviște	Bucharest
20:00 EET (UTC+2)	Dugandžić 66' (pen.); Boldor 68' (o.g.)	Report		Stadium: Superbet Arena-Giulești; Referee: Andrei Chivulete

1 March 2023 28	Botoșani	1–2	Rapid București	Botoșani
20:30 EET (UTC+2)	Camara 90'	Report	Pănoiu 42'; Grigore 90+4'	Stadium: Stadionul Municipal; Referee: Adrian Costreie

4 March 2023 29	Rapid București	0–1	Hermannstadt	Bucharest
20:00 EET (UTC+2)	Balaure 32'	Report		Stadium: Superbet Arena-Giulești; Referee: Viorel Flueran

11 March 2023 30	Farul Constanța	2–1	Rapid București	Ovidiu
20:30 EET (UTC+2)	Artean 21'; Mazilu 50'	Report	Sefer 14'	Stadium: Central Stadium; Referee: Sebastian Colțescu

==== Play-off round ====
===== Table =====
Pos	Team	Pld	W	D	L	GF	GA	GD	Pts	Qualification	FAR	FCS	CFR	CRA	RAP	SPS
1	Farul Constanța (C)	10	6	3	1	22	13	+9	53	Qualification to Champions League first qualifying round		3–2	1–0	3–2	7–2	2–1
2	FCSB	10	5	2	3	15	15	0	46	Qualification to Europa Conference League second qualifying round	2–1		1–0	1–1	1–5	3–1
3	CFR Cluj (O)	10	2	4	4	11	14	−3	42	Qualification to European competition play-offs	1–2	1–1		1–1	2–2	2–1
4	Universitatea Craiova	10	3	4	3	15	14	+1	40		1–1	1–2	1–1		3–1	0–1
5	Rapid București	10	3	3	4	17	20	−3	38		1–1	1–0	3–1	2–3		0–0
6	Sepsi OSK (Note: Cup winner)	10	2	2	6	10	14	−4	29	Qualification to Europa Conference League second qualifying round	1–1	1–2	1–2	1–2	2–0	

Source: Soccerway, FRF (in Romanian), LPF (in Romanian)
Legend: Blue = home team win; Yellow = draw; Red = away team win.
Rules for classification: 1) Points; 2) Points without rounding; 3) Head-to-head points; 4) Head-to-head goal difference; 5) Head-to-head goals scored; 6) Goal difference; 7) Goals scored; 8) Play-off (only if needed to decide champion or teams for UEFA competitions). (Note: only criteria 6 and 7 are applied to establish the classification during the competition.)
(C) Champions; (O) Play-off winners

===== Matches =====
19 March 2023 1	CFR Cluj	2–2	Rapid București	Cluj-Napoca
19:00 EET (UTC+2)	Janga 4' (pen.); Boateng 23'	Report	Käit 11'; Onea 55'	Stadium: Stadionul Dr. Constantin Rădulescu; Referee: Andrei Chivulete

1 April 2023 2	Rapid București	1–1	Farul Constanța	Bucharest
21:45 EEST (UTC+3)	Bamgboye 55'	Report	Nedelcu 76'	Stadium: Superbet Arena-Giulești; Referee: Horațiu Feșnic

10 April 2023 3	Sepsi OSK	2–0	Rapid București	Sfântu Gheorghe
20:30 EEST (UTC+3)	Tudorie 26'; Ștefănescu 86'	Report		Stadium: Sepsi Arena Stadium; Referee: Cătălin Popa

16 April 2023 4	Universitatea Craiova	3–1	Rapid București	Craiova
21:00 EEST (UTC+3)	Cîmpanu 38'; Marković 82'; Roguljić 90+2'	Report	Dugandžić 31' (pen.)	Stadium: Stadionul Ion Oblemenco; Referee: Radu Petrescu

23 April 2023 5	Rapid București	1–0	FCSB	Bucharest
20:30 EEST (UTC+3)	Onea (yellow card) 4'; Albu 21'; Grigore (yellow card) 28'; Al. Ioniță (yellow card) 44'; Ștefan (yellow card) 88'	Report	Omrani (yellow card) 4'; Dawa (yellow card) 18'; Radunović (yellow card) 85'	Stadium: Superbet Arena-Giulești; Referee: Horațiu Feșnic

1 May 2023 6	Rapid București	3–1	CFR Cluj	Bucharest
20:30 EEST (UTC+3)	Dugandžić 9' (pen.), 45+2'; Käit 12'	Report	Braun 15'	Stadium: Superbet Arena-Giulești; Referee: Marcel Bîrsan

6 May 2023 7	Farul Constanța	7–2	Rapid București	Ovidiu
21:30 EEST (UTC+3)	Alibec 3' (pen.), 45', 61'; Băluță 23', 27'; Munteanu 74', 76'; Kiki (yellow card) 78'	Report	Moldovan (yellow card) 2'; Săpunaru (yellow card) 32', (goal) 58'; Bamgboye (yellow card) 55'; Morais (yellow card) 70'; Dugandžić 86' (pen.), (yellow card) 90+1'	Stadium: Central Stadium; Referee: Cătălin Popa

12 May 2023 8	Rapid București	0–0	Sepsi OSK	Bucharest
20:30 EEST (UTC+3)		Report		Stadium: Superbet Arena-Giulești; Referee: Florin Andrei

22 May 2023 9	Rapid București	2–3	Universitatea Craiova	Bucharest
20:30 EEST (UTC+3)	Dugandžić 33' (pen.), 59' (pen.)	Report	Ivan 43' (pen.), 52'; Crețu 65'	Stadium: Superbet Arena-Giulești; Referee: Adrian Cojocaru

27 May 2023 10	FCSB	1–5	Rapid București	Bucharest
20:30 EEST (UTC+3)	Radunović (yellow card) 45+3'; Oct. Popescu 58', (red card) 63'; Omrani (yellow card) 77'	Report	Luckassen 7', (yellow card) 45+2'; Iacob 17', 26'; Bamgboye 68', 79'; Albu (yellow card) 76'; Ștefan (yellow card) 77'; Pănoiu (yellow card) 90+2'	Stadium: Arena Națională; Referee: Sebastian Colțescu

=== Cupa României ===
==== Group stage ====
2022 1	v	TBD
--:-- EET (UTC+2)

2022 2	v	TBD
--:-- EET (UTC+2)

2022 3	v	TBD
--:-- EET (UTC+2)
