= Gabriel Gheorghe =

Romanian footballer (born 2006)

Personal information
- Date of birth: 12 October 2006 (age 20)
- Place of birth: Bucharest, Romania
- Height: 1.76 m (5 ft 9 in)
- Position: Midfielder

Team information
- Current team: Argeș Pitești
- Number: 29

Youth career
- –2022: Juniorul București
- 2022–2024: Rapid București

Senior career*
Years	Team	Apps	(Gls)
2022–2026	Rapid București	6	(0)
2024–2025	→ Argeș Pitești (loan)	18	(1)
2026–	Argeș Pitești	1	(0)

International career^{‡}
2022	Romania U16	4	(0)
2022–2023	Romania U17	6	(0)
2023	Romania U18	2	(0)
2026–	Romania U20	1	(0)
- * Club domestic league appearances and goals as of 12 October 2026 ‡ National team caps and goals as of 31 March 2026

Gabriel Gheorghe (born 12 October 2006) is a Romanian professional footballer who plays as a midfielder for Liga I club Argeș Pitești.

== Career statistics ==
As of 12 October 2026

Appearances and goals by club, season and competition
Club	Season	League			Cupa României		Europe		Other		Total	
Club	Season	Division	Apps	Goals	Apps	Goals	Apps	Goals	Apps	Goals	Apps	Goals
Rapid București	2022–23	Liga I	0	0	1	0	—		—		1	0
Rapid București	2023–24	Liga I	0	0	0	0	—		—		0	0
Rapid București	2024–25	Liga I	1	0	—		—		—		1	0
Rapid București	2025–26	Liga I	5	0	0	0	—		—		5	0
Rapid București	2026–27	Liga I	0	0	—		—		—		0	0
Rapid București	Total		6	0	1	0	—		—		7	0
Argeș Pitești (loan)	2024–25	Liga II	18	1	2	0	—		—		20	1
Argeș Pitești	2026–27	Liga I	1	0	0	0	—		—		1	0
Career total			25	1	3	0	—		—		28	1

== Honours ==
Argeș Pitești

- Liga II: 2024–25
