= Alexandru Ioniță (footballer, born 1994) =

Romanian footballer (born 1994)

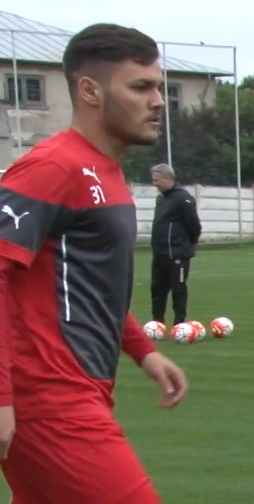
- Ioniță with Astra Giurgiu in 2015

Personal information
- Full name: Alexandru Cornel Ioniță
- Date of birth: 14 December 1994 (age 31)
- Place of birth: Bucharest, Romania
- Height: 1.72 m (5 ft 8 in)
- Positions: Attacking midfielder; winger

Team information
- Current team: Yunnan Yukun
- Number: 10

Youth career
- 2001–2012: Rapid București

Senior career*
Years	Team	Apps	(Gls)
2011–2013	Rapid București	27	(6)
2014–2018	Astra Giurgiu	83	(17)
2018–2021	CFR Cluj	32	(3)
2019	→ Universitatea Craiova (loan)	6	(0)
2020–2021	→ Astra Giurgiu (loan)	8	(1)
2021–2024	Rapid București	74	(11)
2024–	Yunnan Yukun	85	(16)

International career
2011	Romania U18	1	(0)
2011–2012	Romania U19	5	(2)
2013–2016	Romania U21	6	(2)
2017	Romania	1	(0)
- * Club domestic league appearances and goals as of 8 November 2026

Alexandru Cornel Ioniță (Romanian pronunciation: [alekˈsandru korˈnel joˈnit͡sə]; born 14 December 1994) is a Romanian professional footballer who plays as an attacking midfielder or a winger for Chinese Super League club Yunnan Yukun.

A youth exponent of Rapid București, Ioniță made his professional debut at age 16. He moved to Astra Giurgiu in 2014, where he won four domestic trophies. Four years later, Ioniță was subject to a €1 million transfer to CFR Cluj, but failed to impose himself and had loan stints at Universitatea Craiova and Astra. In 2021, he returned to Rapid București.

At international level, Ioniță debuted for the Romania senior team in a 3–1 victory against Kazakhstan in September 2017.

== Club career ==
=== Rapid București ===
Born in Bucharest, Ioniță joined the academy of Rapid București at the age of six. On 21 May 2011, at only sixteen years and five months, he made his senior debut in a 1–0 Liga I victory against FC Brașov. In the 2013–14 Liga II, Ioniță made fourteen appearances and six goals in total.

=== Astra Giurgiu ===
Ioniță moved to Astra Giurgiu during the winter 2014 transfer window, with fellow Liga I clubs Dinamo București and Petrolul Ploiești also interested in signing him. On 15 October 2015, he scored his first goal for Astra in a 3–0 away victory against Viitorul Constanța at the 2015–16 Cupa Ligii.

On 2 May 2016, Ioniță netted twice in a 4–2 home success against Dinamo București as Astra celebrated its first league title. Following the transfer of Constantin Budescu to FCSB in June 2017, Ioniță took over his number 10 shirt. On 13 July that year, he recorded his first UEFA Europa League goal in a 3–1 home defeat against Zira for the second qualifying round.

Ioniță was named the Liga I Player of the Month for November 2017 after scoring in three consecutive league matches, against Universitatea Craiova, Concordia Chiajna and FCSB, respectively. Amid rumours of a transfer to CFR Cluj in early January 2018, Ioniță refused to renew his contract with Astra and was expelled from the first team for an undetermined period.

=== CFR Cluj ===
On 20 January 2018, Ioniță joined CFR Cluj's training camp in Spain after he was acquired for a rumoured fee of €1 million. Three days later, the move was made official. On 5 February, Ioniță made his competitive debut in a 2–0 league victory against Concordia Chiajna at home. Later that month, he netted in the rebound from his penalty that had been saved by his former Rapid teammate Virgil Drăghia, recording his first goal in a 2–0 away victory against Juventus București.

In July 2019, following a disappointing 2018–19 campaign in which Ioniță only scored two goals from 27 appearances in all competitions, he agreed to a one-year loan at Universitatea Craiova with a purchase option. After failing to gain playing time Craiova as well, the contract was terminated early and he returned to Astra Giurgiu on loan in the beginning of 2020.

In September 2020, the Romanian Anti-Doping Agency handed Ioniță along with two of his Astra teammates a one-year playing ban after they each received intravenous injections of more than 100mL of vitamins within one day. On 7 September 2021, CFR Cluj announced the termination of Ioniță's contract on a mutual agreement.

=== Return to Rapid București ===
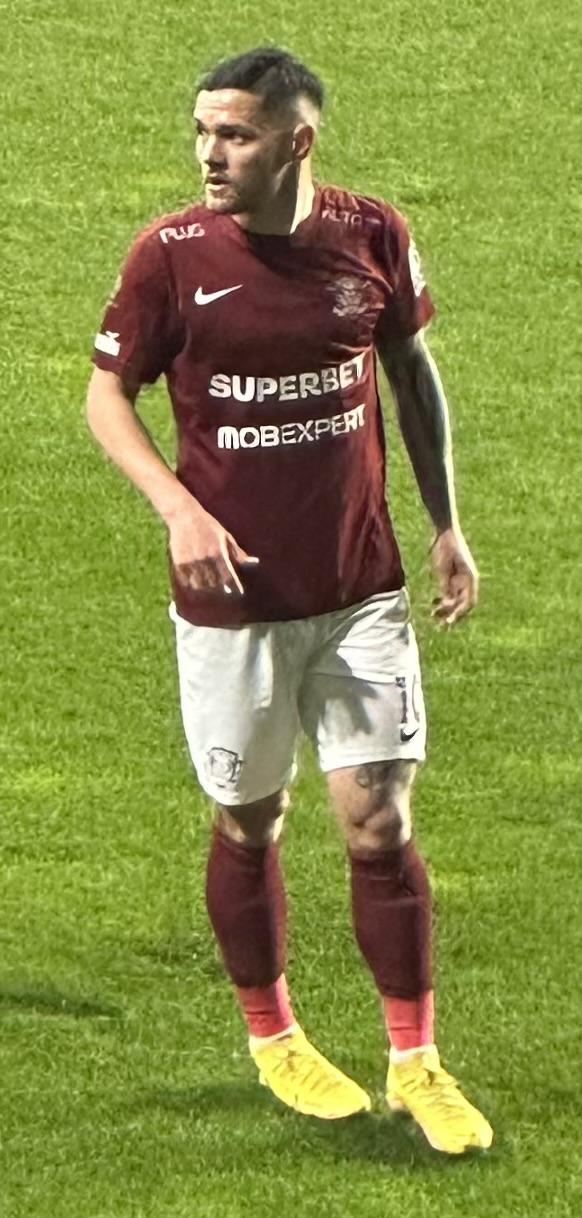
Ioniță with Rapid București during a derby against FCSB, April 2023

On 16 September 2021, Ioniță returned for Rapid București as a free agent on a three-year contract. On 17 September, he debuted in a 2–0 victory against his former club CFR Cluj in the Liga I.

Ioniță scored his first goal upon his return on 11 February 2022, equalising late in a 1–1 league draw against Sepsi OSK as his team played 40 minutes with one player less. On 13 March, he opened the scoring in a 3–1 win against Dinamo București, their first Bucharest derby victory in almost fourteen years.

Ioniță regained his goalscoring form in the first part of the 2023–24 season, scoring five goals in 18 league appearances.

=== Yunnan Yukun ===
On 26 February 2024, Rapid București announced that Ioniță was transferred to China League One side Yunnan Yukun. He scored eight goals in 30 league appearances in 2024, helping the club win the title and gain promotion to the 2025 Chinese Super League.

On 22 February 2025, Ioniță made his Chinese Super League debut for Yunnan Yukun, playing the full match in a 0–2 home defeat to Beijing Guoan. On 28 March, he scored his first top-flight goal and provided an assist in a 4–3 away win over Shenzhen Peng City.

== International career ==
In September 2017, Ioniță was selected by the Romania senior team for the 2018 FIFA World Cup qualification matches against Kazakhstan and Denmark. He debuted in the former match, coming on as an 80th-minute substitute for double goal scorer Constantin Budescu in the 3–1 win in Ploiești.

== Personal life ==
Ioniță's father played football in the lower divisions. Like his son, he supports Rapid București.

== Career statistics ==
=== Club ===
As of match played 8 November 2026

Appearances and goals by club, season and competition
Club	Season	League			National cup (Note: Includes Cupa României, Chinese FA Cup)		League cup (Note: Includes Cupa Ligii)		Continental		Other		Total	
Club	Season	Division	Apps	Goals	Apps	Goals	Apps	Goals	Apps	Goals	Apps	Goals	Apps	Goals
Rapid București	2010–11	Liga I	1	0	0	0	—		—		—		1	0
Rapid București	2011–12	Liga I	1	0	0	0	—		0	0	—		1	0
Rapid București	2012–13	Liga I	11	0	0	0	—		0	0	—		11	0
Rapid București	2013–14	Liga II	14	6	3	0	—		—		—		17	6
Rapid București	Total		27	6	3	0	—		0	0	—		30	6
Astra Giurgiu	2013–14	Liga I	4	0	0	0	—		—		—		4	0
Astra Giurgiu	2014–15	Liga I	9	0	1	0	2	0	0	0	0	0	12	0
Astra Giurgiu	2015–16	Liga I	19	3	3	1	4	1 (Note: Appearance(s) in UEFA Europa League)	1	0	—		27	5
Astra Giurgiu	2016–17	Liga I	31	4	5	2	1	0	6	0	1 (Note: Appearance in Supercupa României)	0	44	6
Astra Giurgiu	2017–18	Liga I	20	10	1	0	—		4	1	—		25	11
Astra Giurgiu	Total		83	17	10	3	7	1	11	1	1	0	112	22
CFR Cluj	2017–18	Liga I	9	1	0	0	—		—		—		9	1
CFR Cluj	2018–19	Liga I	23	2	4	0	—		4 (Note: One appearance in UEFA Champions League, three appearances in UEFA Europa League)	0	0	0	31	2
CFR Cluj	Total		32	3	4	0	—		4	0	0	0	40	3
Universitatea Craiova (loan)	2019–20	Liga I	6	0	2	1	—		3	0	—		11	1
Astra Giurgiu (loan)	2019–20	Liga I	6	1	0	0	—		—		—		6	1
Astra Giurgiu (loan)	2020–21	Liga I	2	0	—		—		—		—		2	0
Astra Giurgiu (loan)	Total		8	1	0	0	—		—		—		8	1
Rapid București	2021–22	Liga I	22	4	0	0	—		—		—		22	4
Rapid București	2022–23	Liga I	34	2	2	0	—		—		—		36	2
Rapid București	2023–24	Liga I	18	5	2	0	—		—		—		20	5
Rapid București	Total		74	11	4	0	—		—		—		78	11
Yunnan Yukun	2024	China League One	30	8	1	0	—		—		—		31	8
Yunnan Yukun	2025	Chinese Super League	25	3	3	0	—		—		—		28	3
Yunnan Yukun	2026	Chinese Super League	30	5	3	2	—		—		—		33	7
Yunnan Yukun	Total		85	16	7	2	—		—		—		92	18
Career total			315	54	30	6	7	1	18	1	1	0	371	62

=== International ===
As of match played 5 October 2017

Appearances and goals by national team and year
National team	Year	Apps	Goals
Romania	2017	1	0
Total		1	0

== Honours ==
Astra Giurgiu

- Liga I: 2015–16
- Cupa României: 2013–14
- Supercupa României: 2014, 2016

CFR Cluj

- Liga I: 2017–18, 2018–19
- Supercupa României: 2018

Yunnan Yukun

- China League One: 2024

Individual

- DigiSport Liga I Player of the Month: November 2017
