= Claudiu Micovschi =

Romanian footballer

Personal information
- Full name: Claudiu Valentin Micovschi
- Date of birth: 19 May 1999 (age 27)
- Place of birth: Diosig, Romania
- Height: 1.80 m (5 ft 11 in)
- Position: Winger

Team information
- Current team: Argeș Pitești
- Number: 19

Youth career
- 2009–2015: Luceafărul Oradea
- 2015: → Chievo (loan)
- 2015–2019: Genoa

Senior career*
| Years | Team | Apps | (Gls) |
| 2019–2021 | Genoa | 0 | (0) |
| 2019–2020 | → Avellino (loan) | 30 | (4) |
| 2021 | → Reggina (loan) | 7 | (0) |
| 2021–2023 | Avellino | 34 | (1) |
| 2023 | → Fidelis Andria (loan) | 14 | (1) |
| 2023–2026 | Rapid București | 36 | (0) |
| 2023–2024 | → UTA Arad (loan) | 32 | (9) |
| 2026– | Argeș Pitești | 22 | (1) |

International career
| 2014 | Romania U15 | 2 | (0) |
| 2014–2015 | Romania U16 | 3 | (0) |
| 2015–2016 | Romania U17 | 4 | (1) |
| 2016 | Romania U18 | 4 | (0) |
| 2017–2018 | Romania U19 | 8 | (1) |
- * Club domestic league appearances and goals as of 31 October 2026

Claudiu Valentin Micovschi (born 19 May 1999) is a Romanian professional footballer who plays as a winger for Liga I club Argeș Pitești.

== Club career ==
=== Luceafărul Oradea ===
Born in Diosig, Bihor County, Claudiu Micovschi started his football career at Luceafărul Oradea, a young club in the Romanian football landscape, but focused on raising young players. After excellent results in the youth teams of Luceafărul, Micovschi started to train and be in the senior team entourage since the age of 16, being also convoked to the Romania U-16 team. After a half-year loan at Chievo, Micovschi was sold to Genoa in the summer of 2015.

=== Chievo ===
In February 2015, Micovschi was loaned to Chievo, where he played for the youth teams of the club from Verona until the summer of the same year, when he returned to Luceafărul.

=== Genoa ===
In 2015, Micovschi signed a 3-year contract with Genoa and started to play for the Primavera team of the club. In November 2015, due to the qualities shown in the youth team, Micovschi received a training session with the first squad of the Serie A club. In December 2017, Micovschi became the captain of the Griffin youth team, with no less than 8 goals and 2 assists in 14 matches played for the Genovese team.

==== Loan to Avellino ====
On 13 August 2019, he was loaned to Serie C club Avellino. He made his senior professional debut on 25 August 2019 in a game against Catania, which ended in the 6–3 home loss as he played the whole match. In his third game on 7 September 2019, he scored his first professional goal in a 2–0 victory over Teramo.

==== Loan to Reggina ====
On 12 January 2021, Micovschi joined Serie B club Reggina on loan.

=== Avellino ===
==== Loan to Fidelis Andria ====
On 29 January 2023, Micovschi was loaned by Fidelis Andria.

=== Romania ===
On 3 August 2023, Micovschi joined Romanian side Rapid București, signing a 2-year contract. After not having place in the team, the side midfielder reached an agreement with UTA Arad to be loaned for a season.

== International career ==
Claudiu Micovschi played for under-16, under-17, under-18 and under-19 football teams.

== Career statistics ==
As of match played 31 October 2026

Appearances by club, season and competition
| Club | Season | League | | | National cup (Note: Includes Coppa Italia Serie C, Cupa României) | | Other | | Total | |
| Club | Season | Division | Apps | Goals | Apps | Goals | Apps | Goals | Apps | Goals |
|---|---|---|---|---|---|---|---|---|---|---|
| Avellino (loan) | 2019–20 | Serie C | 30 | 4 | 4 | 1 | 1 (Note: Appearance in Serie C promotion play-offs) | 0 | 35 | 5 |
| Reggina (loan) | 2020–21 | Serie B | 7 | 0 | — | | — | | 7 | 0 |
| Avellino | 2021–22 | Serie C | 27 | 1 | 0 | 0 | 0 | 0 | 27 | 1 |
| Avellino | 2022–23 | Serie C | 7 | 0 | 2 | 0 | — | | 9 | 0 |
| Avellino | Total | | 34 | 1 | 2 | 0 | 0 | 0 | 36 | 1 |
| Fidelis Andria (loan) | 2022–23 | Serie C | 14 | 1 | — | | — | | 14 | 1 |
| Rapid București | 2024–25 | Liga I | 0 | 0 | — | | — | | 0 | 0 |
| Rapid București | 2024–25 | Liga I | 26 | 0 | 3 | 0 | — | | 29 | 0 |
| Rapid București | 2025–26 | Liga I | 11 | 0 | 1 | 0 | — | | 12 | 0 |
| Rapid București | Total | | 37 | 0 | 4 | 0 | — | | 41 | 0 |
| UTA Arad (loan) | 2023–24 | Liga I | 31 | 9 | 1 | 0 | — | | 32 | 9 |
| Argeș Pitești | 2025–26 | Liga I | 11 | 1 | 1 | 0 | — | | 12 | 1 |
| Argeș Pitești | 2026–27 | Liga I | 11 | 0 | 2 | 0 | — | | 13 | 0 |
| Argeș Pitești | Total | | 22 | 1 | 3 | 0 | — | | 25 | 1 |
| Career total | | | 175 | 16 | 14 | 1 | 1 | 0 | 190 | 17 |
