= Răzvan Onea =

Romanian professional footballer (born 1998)

Personal information
- Full name: Philippe Răzvan Onea
- Date of birth: 19 May 1998 (age 28)
- Place of birth: Paris, France
- Height: 1.71 m (5 ft 7 in)
- Position: Full back

Team information
- Current team: Rapid București
- Number: 19

Youth career
- 2012–2017: LPS Satu Mare

Senior career*
Years	Team	Apps	(Gls)
2017–2019	Afumați	63	(2)
2019–2022	Politehnica Iași	61	(2)
2022–	Rapid București	121	(3)
- * Club domestic league appearances and goals as of 7 November 2026

Philippe Răzvan Onea (born 19 May 1998) is a Romanian professional footballer who plays as a right back for Liga I club Rapid București.

== Club career ==
=== Politehnica Iași ===
In the summer of 2019, Onea moved to first league club Politehnica Iași for an undisclosed fee, and later signed a five-year deal with the club. On 31 August, he made his Liga I debut in a 3–2 away defeat at Gaz Metan Mediaș.

== Career statistics ==
As of match played 7 November 2026

Appearances and goals by club, season and competition
Club	Season	League			Cupa României		Europe		Other		Total	
Club	Season	Division	Apps	Goals	Apps	Goals	Apps	Goals	Apps	Goals	Apps	Goals
Afumați	2017–18	Liga II	33	1	2	0	—		—		35	1
Afumați	2018–19	Liga III	30	1	0	0	—		—		30	1
Afumați	Total		63	2	2	0	—		—		65	2
Politehnica Iași	2019–20	Liga I	10	0	2	0	—		—		12	0
Politehnica Iași	2020–21	Liga I	38	2	2	0	—		—		40	2
Politehnica Iași	2021–22	Liga II	13	0	1	0	—		—		14	0
Politehnica Iași	Total		61	2	5	0	—		—		66	2
Rapid București	2021–22	Liga I	6	0	—		—		—		6	0
Rapid București	2022–23	Liga I	33	1	2	0	—		—		35	1
Rapid București	2023–24	Liga I	21	1	2	0	—		—		23	1
Rapid București	2024–25	Liga I	20	0	3	0	—		—		23	0
Rapid București	2025–26	Liga I	27	0	2	0	—		—		29	0
Rapid București	2026–27	Liga I	14	1	1	0	—		—		15	1
Rapid București	Total		121	3	10	0	—		—		131	3
Career total			245	7	17	0	—		—		262	7
