= Paul Iacob =

Romanian footballer (born 1996)

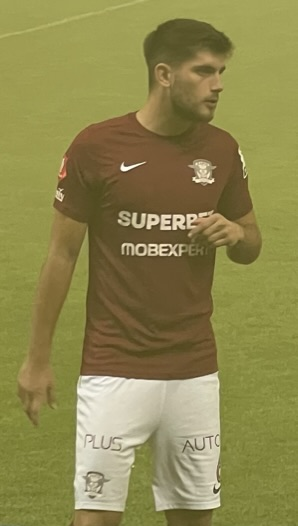
- Iacob with Rapid București in 2022

Personal information
- Full name: Paul Alexandru Iacob
- Date of birth: 21 June 1996 (age 30)
- Place of birth: Constanța, Romania
- Height: 1.85 m (6 ft 1 in)
- Positions: Centre-back; defensive midfielder

Team information
- Current team: Oțelul Galați
- Number: 6

Youth career
- 2006–2009: Farul Constanța
- 2009–2015: Gheorghe Hagi Academy

Senior career*
Years	Team	Apps	(Gls)
2014–2021	Viitorul Constanța	34	(0)
2016	→ Gaz Metan Mediaș (loan)	16	(0)
2016–2017	→ FC Brașov (loan)	30	(4)
2017	→ ASA Târgu Mureș (loan)	20	(6)
2018	→ Dunărea Călărași (loan)	12	(0)
2020–2021	→ Chindia Târgoviște (loan)	32	(2)
2021–2022	Chindia Târgoviște	37	(0)
2022–2025	Rapid București	59	(5)
2025	→ Botoșani (loan)	12	(1)
2025–	Oțelul Galați	42	(2)

International career
2017–2019	Romania U21	2	(0)
- * Club domestic league appearances and goals as of 1 November 2026

Paul Alexandru Iacob (born 21 June 1996) is a Romanian professional footballer who plays as a centre-back or a defensive midfielder for Liga I club Oțelul Galați, which he captains.

== Career statistics ==
As of match played 1 November 2026

Appearances and goals by club, season and competition
Club	Season	League			Cupa României		Europe		Other		Total	
Club	Season	Division	Apps	Goals	Apps	Goals	Apps	Goals	Apps	Goals	Apps	Goals
Viitorul Constanța	2014–15	Liga I	0	0	0	0	0	0	1 (Note: Appearance in Cupa Ligii)	0	1	0
Viitorul Constanța	2018–19	Liga I	10	0	4	0	0	0	0	0	14	0
Viitorul Constanța	2019–20	Liga I	24	0	1	0	1 (Note: Appearance in UEFA Europa League)	0	1 (Note: Appearance in Supercupa României)	0	27	0
Viitorul Constanța	Total		34	0	5	0	1	0	2	0	42	0
Gaz Metan Mediaș (loan)	2015–16	Liga II	16	0	—		—		—		16	0
FC Brașov (loan)	2016–17	Liga II	30	4	—		—		—		30	4
ASA Târgu Mureș (loan)	2017–18	Liga II	20	6	—		—		—		20	6
Dunărea Călărași (loan)	2017–18	Liga II	12	0	—		—		—		12	0
Chindia Targoviște (loan)	2020–21	Liga I	32	2	3	1	—		—		35	3
Chindia Targoviște	2021–22	Liga I	37	0	3	0	—		2	0	42	0
Chindia Targoviște	Total		69	2	6	1	—		2	0	77	3
Rapid București	2022–23	Liga I	17	3	2	0	—		—		19	3
Rapid București	2023–24	Liga I	37	2	2	1	—		—		39	3
Rapid București	2024–25	Liga I	5	0	0	0	—		—		5	0
Rapid București	Total		59	5	4	1	—		—		63	6
Botoșani (loan)	2024–25	Liga I	12	1	—		—		—		12	1
Oțelul Galați	2025–26	Liga I	28	2	3	0	—		—		31	2
Oțelul Galați	2026–27	Liga I	14	0	1	0	—		—		15	0
Oțelul Galați	Total		42	2	4	0	—		—		46	2
Career total			294	20	21	2	1	0	4	0	320	22

== Honours ==
Gaz Metan Mediaș

- Liga II: 2015–16

Dunărea Călărași

- Liga II: 2017–18

Viitorul Constanța

- Cupa României: 2018–19
- Supercupa României: 2019
