= Marko Dugandžić =

Croatian footballer (born 1994)

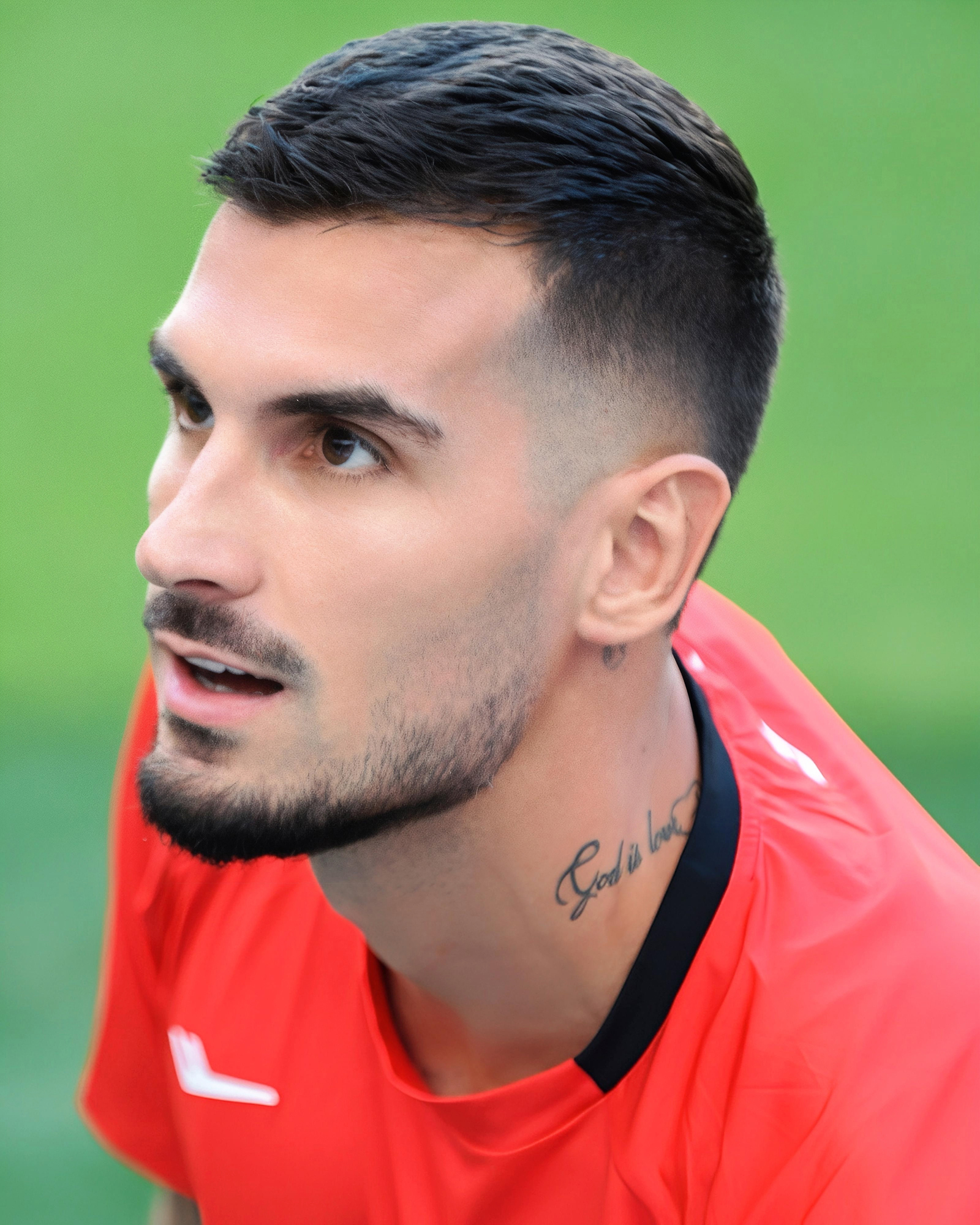
- Dugandžić with Seoul in 2025

Personal information
- Date of birth: 7 April 1994 (age 32)
- Place of birth: Osijek, Croatia
- Height: 1.90 m (6 ft 3 in)
- Position: Forward

Team information
- Current team: Bali United
- Number: 45

Youth career
- 2005–2012: Osijek

Senior career*
| Years | Team | Apps | (Gls) |
| 2012–2015 | Osijek | 45 | (9) |
| 2015 | → Ternana (loan) | 6 | (0) |
| 2015–2017 | Ternana | 15 | (2) |
| 2017–2018 | Matera | 25 | (6) |
| 2018–2019 | Osijek | 6 | (0) |
| 2020 | Botoșani | 20 | (11) |
| 2020–2021 | Sochi | 18 | (5) |
| 2022 | CFR Cluj | 14 | (1) |
| 2022–2023 | Rapid București | 44 | (28) |
| 2023–2025 | Al-Tai | 36 | (4) |
| 2025 | Seoul | 32 | (5) |
| 2026 | Levski Sofia | 6 | (1) |
| 2026– | Bali United | 6 | (2) |

International career
| 2009 | Croatia U16 | 2 | (0) |
| 2012 | Croatia U18 | 6 | (6) |
| 2012–2013 | Croatia U19 | 10 | (6) |
| 2015 | Croatia U21 | 1 | (0) |
- * Club domestic league appearances and goals as of 8 November 2026

Marko Dugandžić (born 7 April 1994) is a Croatian professional footballer who plays as a forward for Super League club Bali United.

== Club career ==
His good performances for Osijek attracted many European teams, such as Fiorentina, Blackburn Rovers and Leeds United. Instead, he signed for Serie B Ternana in January 2015.

On 14 October 2020, after a short stint at Romanian side Botoșani, Dugandžić joined Russian Premier League club PFC Sochi.

On 11 January 2022, he returned to Romania and signed with CFR Cluj.

=== Rapid București ===
On 22 July 2022, Dugandžić was transferred to another Liga I side Rapid București for a reported fee of €400,000. He made his debut against Rapid's rivals from Ghencea, FCSB, scoring a goal and assisting captain Cristian Săpunaru. He also scored against rivals Petrolul Ploiesti in the Primvs Derby. After that, he became a vital player for Rapid, scoring 16 goals across the 2022–23 regular season. During the championship play-off stage, he added another six goals to his tally and was crowned the top scorer of the season, with 22 goals.

=== Al-Tai ===
On 7 September 2023, Dugandžić joined Saudi Arabian side Al-Tai.

=== Levski Sofia ===
After a stint with Seoul in the K League 1, on 10 March 2026, Dugandžić joined Bulgarian First League club Levski Sofia on a short-term contract until the end of the season. On 2 May 2026, he scored his first and only goal for the "bluemen" in the 1–0 win over CSKA 1948, which clinched the title for Levski Sofia, their first since 2009, with four games to spare.

== Career statistics ==
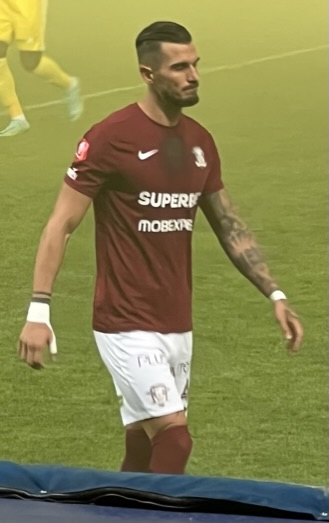
Dugandžić with Rapid București in August 2022

As of match played 8 November 2026

Appearances and goals by club, season and competition
| Club | Season | League | | | National cup (Note: Includes Croatian Cup, Coppa Italia, Russian Cup, Cupa României, King's Cup, Korean FA Cup) | | Continental | | Other | | Total | |
| Club | Season | Division | Apps | Goals | Apps | Goals | Apps | Goals | Apps | Goals | Apps | Goals |
|---|---|---|---|---|---|---|---|---|---|---|---|---|
| Osijek | 2012–13 | Prva NHL | 6 | 0 | — | | 2 (Note: Appearance(s) in UEFA Europa League) | 0 | — | | 8 | 0 |
| Osijek | 2013–14 | Prva NHL | 26 | 3 | 4 | 3 | — | | — | | 30 | 6 |
| Osijek | 2014–15 | Prva NHL | 6 | 0 | 1 | 0 | — | | — | | 7 | 0 |
| Osijek | Total | | 38 | 3 | 5 | 3 | 2 | 0 | 0 | 0 | 45 | 6 |
| Ternana (loan) | 2014–15 | Serie B | 6 | 0 | — | | — | | — | | 6 | 0 |
| Ternana | 2015–16 | Serie B | 12 | 1 | 2 | 1 | — | | — | | 14 | 2 |
| Ternana | 2016–17 | Serie B | 3 | 0 | 2 | 0 | — | | — | | 5 | 0 |
| Ternana | Total | | 15 | 1 | 4 | 1 | 0 | 0 | 0 | 0 | 19 | 2 |
| Matera | 2017–18 | Serie C | 25 | 5 | — | | — | | 1 (Note: Appearance in Coppa Italia Serie C) | 1 | 26 | 6 |
| Osijek | 2018–19 | Prva NHL | 3 | 0 | 2 | 2 | — | | — | | 5 | 2 |
| Osijek | 2019–20 | Prva NHL | 3 | 0 | 1 | 1 | 1 | 0 | — | | 5 | 1 |
| Osijek | Total | | 6 | 0 | 3 | 3 | 1 | 0 | — | | 10 | 3 |
| Botoșani | 2019–20 | Liga I | 13 | 8 | — | | — | | — | | 13 | 8 |
| Botoșani | 2020–21 | Liga I | 5 | 2 | — | | 2 | 1 | — | | 7 | 3 |
| Botoșani | Total | | 18 | 10 | 0 | 0 | 2 | 1 | 0 | 0 | 20 | 11 |
| Sochi | 2020–21 | Russian Premier League | 14 | 1 | 3 | 1 | — | | — | | 17 | 2 |
| Sochi | 2021–22 | Russian Premier League | 4 | 1 | — | | 3 (Note: Appearances in UEFA Europa Conference League) | 2 | — | | 7 | 3 |
| Sochi | Total | | 18 | 2 | 3 | 1 | 3 | 2 | 0 | 0 | 24 | 5 |
| CFR Cluj | 2021–22 | Liga I | 13 | 1 | — | | — | | — | | 13 | 1 |
| CFR Cluj | 2022–23 | Liga I | 1 | 0 | — | | 2 (Note: Appearances in UEFA Champions League) | 0 | 1 (Note: Appearance in Supercupa României) | 0 | 4 | 0 |
| CFR Cluj | Total | | 14 | 1 | 0 | 0 | 2 | 0 | 1 | 0 | 17 | 1 |
| Rapid București | 2022–23 | Liga I | 37 | 22 | 4 | 0 | — | | — | | 41 | 22 |
| Rapid București | 2023–24 | Liga I | 7 | 6 | — | | — | | — | | 7 | 6 |
| Rapid București | Total | | 44 | 28 | 4 | 0 | 0 | 0 | 0 | 0 | 48 | 28 |
| Al-Tai | 2023–24 | Saudi Professional League | 23 | 2 | 1 | 0 | — | | — | | 24 | 2 |
| Al-Tai | 2024–25 | Saudi First Division League | 13 | 2 | 1 | 0 | — | | — | | 14 | 2 |
| Al-Tai | Total | | 36 | 4 | 2 | 0 | 0 | 0 | 0 | 0 | 38 | 4 |
| FC Seoul | 2025 | K League 1 | 32 | 4 | 1 | 0 | 4 (Note: Appearances in AFC Champions League Elite) | 1 | — | | 37 | 5 |
| Levski Sofia | 2025–26 | Bulgarian First League | 6 | 1 | 0 | 0 | 0 | 0 | — | | 6 | 1 |
| Bali United | 2026–27 | Super League | 6 | 2 | 0 | 0 | 0 | 0 | — | | 6 | 2 |
| Career total | | | 264 | 61 | 22 | 8 | 14 | 3 | 2 | 1 | 302 | 74 |

== Honours ==
CFR Cluj

- Liga I: 2021–22
- Supercupa României runner-up: 2022

Levski Sofia

- Bulgarian First League: 2025–26

Individual

- Liga I top scorer: 2022–23
- Liga I Team of the Season: 2022–23
