= 2024–25 FC Rapid București season =

FC Rapid București
2024–25 season
- Manager: Neil Lennon (until 20 August); Marius Șumudică
- Stadium: Rapid-Giulești Stadium
- Liga I: 12th
- Cupa României: Pre-season
- Average home league attendance: 11,145
- Biggest defeat: Petrolul Ploiești 1–0 Rapid București
| Home colours | Away colours | Third colours |

The 2024–25 season is the 102nd season in the history of FC Rapid București, and the club's fourth consecutive season in Liga I. In addition to the domestic league, the team is scheduled to participate in the Cupa României.

== Transfers ==
=== In ===
| Pos. | Player | Transferred from | Fee | Date | Source |
|---|---|---|---|---|---|
| MF | (Slovakia) Jakub Hromada | (Czech Republic) Slavia Prague | €500,000 | 1 July 2024 | |
| MF | (Serbia) Luka Gojković | (Serbia) Javor Ivanjica | Undisclosed | 1 July 2024 | |
| FW | (Slovakia) Timotej Jambor | (Slovakia) MŠK Žilina | €1,000,000 | 1 July 2024 | |
| DF | (Romania) Cristian Manea | (Romania) CFR Cluj | Free | 1 July 2024 | |
| DF | (Romania) Alexandru Pașcanu | (Spain) Ponferradina | €350,000 | 29 July 2024 | |

=== Out ===
| Pos. | Player | Transferred to | Fee | Date | Source |
|---|---|---|---|---|---|
| MF | (Kosovo) Ermal Krasniqi | (Czech Republic) Sparta Prague | €2,000,000 | 1 July 2024 | |
| MF | (Nigeria) Funsho Bamgboye | (Turkey) Hatayspor | End of contract | 1 July 2024 | |
| GK | (Romania) Codruț Sandu | (Romania) FC U Craiova 1948 | Loan | 3 July 2024 | |
| MF | (Croatia) Damjan Đoković | | Contract termination | 12 July 2024 | |

== Friendlies ==
=== Pre-season ===
| 20 June 2024 Friendly | Rapid București (Romania) | 4–1 | (Romania) Gloria Buzău |
| 09:00 UTC+2 |

| 25 June 2024 Friendly | NK Radomlje (Slovenia) | 1–2 | (Romania) Rapid București | Placerovci, Slovenia |
| 16:00 UTC+2 | | | | Stadium: Sportni Center Gorišnica |

| 25 June 2024 Friendly | Ružomberok (Slovakia) | 1–1 | (Romania) Rapid București | Slovenia |
| 11:00 UTC+2 |

| 28 June 2024 Friendly | Celje (Slovenia) | 1–0 | (Romania) Rapid București | Maribor, Slovenia |
| 11:00 UTC+2 | Vuklišević 58' | | | Stadium: Ljudski vrt |

| 1 July 2024 Friendly | Zagłębie Lubin (Poland) | 0–1 | (Romania) Rapid București | Moravske Toplice, Slovenia |
| 17:30 UTC+2 | Terlecki (yellow card) 57' | | Stan (yellow card) 56'; Rrahmani 82' | Stadium: Moravski Stadion |

| 4 July 2024 Friendly | Maribor (Slovenia) | 0–4 | (Romania) Rapid București | Slovenia |
| 11:00 UTC+2 | | | Rrahmani 24', 49'; Jambor 67'; Gheorghe 86' |

== Competitions ==
=== Overall record ===
| Competition | First match | Last match | Starting round | Record | | | | | | | |
| Competition | First match | Last match | Starting round | Pld | W | D | L | GF | GA | GD | Win % |
|---|---|---|---|---|---|---|---|---|---|---|---|
| Liga I | 13 July 2024 | | Matchday 1 | 4 | 0 | 3 | 1 | 5 | 6 | −1 | 0.00 |
| Cupa României | | | | 0 | 0 | 0 | 0 | 0 | 0 | +0 | — |
| Total | | | | 4 | 0 | 3 | 1 | 5 | 6 | −1 | 0.00 |

Last updated: 5 August 2024
Source: Soccerway

=== Liga I ===
==== League table ====
| Pos | Team | Pld | W | D | L | GF | GA | GD | Pts | Advances |
|---|---|---|---|---|---|---|---|---|---|---|
| 4 | Universitatea Cluj | 30 | 14 | 10 | 6 | 43 | 27 | +16 | 52 (Note: Ranked on head-to-head points: Universitatea Craiova (4); Universitatea Cluj (1).) | Qualification for play-off round |
| 5 | Dinamo București | 30 | 13 | 12 | 5 | 41 | 26 | +15 | 51 | Qualification for play-off round |
| 6 | Rapid București | 30 | 11 | 13 | 6 | 35 | 26 | +9 | 46 | Qualification for play-off round |
| 7 | Sepsi OSK | 30 | 11 | 8 | 11 | 38 | 35 | +3 | 41 (Note: Ranked on head-to-head goal difference: Sepsi (+3); Hermannstadt (-3).) | Qualification for play-out round |
| 8 | Hermannstadt | 30 | 11 | 8 | 11 | 34 | 40 | −6 | 41 | Qualification for play-out round |

Source: LPF (in Romanian)
Rules for classification: 1) Points; 2) Head-to-head points; 3) Head-to-head goal difference; 4) Head-to-head goals scored; 5) Goal difference; 6) Goals scored; 7) Play-off.

==== Results summary ====
| Overall | | | | | | | | Home | | | | | | Away | | | | | |
| Pld | W | D | L | GF | GA | GD | Pts | W | D | L | GF | GA | GD | W | D | L | GF | GA | GD |
|---|---|---|---|---|---|---|---|---|---|---|---|---|---|---|---|---|---|---|---|
| 4 | 0 | 3 | 1 | 5 | 6 | −1 | 3 | 0 | 1 | 0 | 2 | 2 | 0 | 0 | 2 | 1 | 3 | 4 | −1 |

Last updated: 5 August 2024.

==== Results by round ====
| Round | 1 | 2 | 3 | 4 |
|---|---|---|---|---|
| Ground | A | H | A | H |
| Result | D | D | L | D |
| Position | 5 | 9 | 12 | 12 |

Updated to match(es) played on 5 August 2024. Source:
A = Away; H = Home; W = Win; D = Draw; L = Loss

==== Matches ====
The match schedule was released on 1 July 2024.

| 13 July 2024 1 | UTA Arad | 1–1 | Rapid București | Arad |
| 19:15 UTC+3 | Cîmpanu 60'; Omondi (yellow card) 90'; Halaf (yellow card) 90+3'; Pedro (yellow card) 90+6' | | Braun 23'; El Sawy (yellow card) 90+3'; Iacob (yellow card) 90+4'; Aioani (yellow card) 90+4' | Stadium: Francisc von Neuman Stadium; Attendance: 10,000; Referee: Sebastian Colțescu |

| 20 July 2024 2 | Rapid București | 2–2 | CFR Cluj | Bucharest |
| 22:00 | Rrahmani 53' (pen.); Ignat (yellow card) 41'; Hasani 90+7' | | Bîrligea 28'; Michael 75' | Stadium: Rapid-Giulești Stadium; Referee: István Kovács |

| 29 July 2024 3 | Petrolul Ploiești | 1–0 | Rapid București | Ploiești |
| 22:00 UTC+3 | Berisha 31'; Eșanu (yellow card) 90'; Hanca (yellow card) 90+5' | | Gojković (red card) 87' | Stadium: Ilie Oană Stadium; Attendance: 9,700; Referee: Andrei Chivulete |

| 5 August 2024 4 | Rapid București | 2–2 | Sepsi OSK | Bucharest |
| 22:00 | Blažek 3'; Petrila 42' | | Varga 1'; Debeljuh 68' | Stadium: Rapid-Giulești Stadium; Referee: Marian Barbu |

| 10 August 2024 5 | Gloria Buzău | 1–1 | Rapid București | Buzău |
| 22:00 | Čanađija (yellow card) 27'; Prepeliță (yellow card) 41'; Budescu 77' (pen.); Dumitru (yellow card) 81' | Report | Papeau 10' | Stadium: Buzău Municipal Stadium; Attendance: 7,600; Referee: (Romania) Horațiu Feșnic |

| 18 August 2024 6 | Rapid București | 1–1 | Dinamo București | Bucharest |
| 21:30 | Diogo Mendes (yellow card) 2'; Petrila 53' (pen.); Săpunaru (yellow card) 59'; Blažek (yellow card) 59'; Ignat (yellow card) 77'; Borza (yellow card) 86'; Lennon (yellow card) 88' | Report | Sivis (yellow card) 59'; Bani (yellow card) 59'; Selmani 79' (pen.) (yellow card) 88'; Cîrjan (yellow card) 82' | Stadium: Rapid-Giulești Stadium; Attendance: 12,378; Referee: (Romania) Iulian Călin |

| 23 August 2024 7 | Politehnica Iași | 1–2 | Rapid București | Iași |
| 22:00 | Bordeianu (yellow card) 62'; Tony (yellow card) 71'; Gonçalo Filipe Carmo Teixeira 78'; Samayoa (yellow card) 90+4' | Report | Pașcanu 44'; Papeau (yellow card) 45+4'; Braun (yellow card) 45+6'; Pop 53'; Șumudică (yellow card) 82'; Ignat (yellow card) 86'; Jambor (yellow card) 90+6' | Stadium: Emil Alexandrescu Stadium; Attendance: 8,375; Referee: (Romania) George Găman |

| 31 August 2024 8 | Universitatea Craiova | 1–1 | Rapid București | Craiova |
| 21:30 | Koljić (yellow card) 12'; Grego (yellow card) 27'; Mitriță 33' (pen.); Vlădoiu (yellow card) 52'; Baiaram (yellow card) 53' | Report | Braun 18'; Petrila (yellow card) 28'; Săpunaru (yellow card) 32' | Stadium: Ion Oblemenco Stadium; Attendance: 19,940; Referee: (Romania) István Kovács |

| 16 September 2024 | Rapid București | – | Universitatea Cluj | Bucharest |
| 21:00 | | | | Stadium: Rapid-Giulești Stadium |

| 23 September 2024 | Unirea Slobozia | – | Rapid București | Clinceni |
| 21:00 | | | | Stadium: Clinceni Stadium |

| 28 September 2024 | Rapid București | – | Oțelul Galați | Bucharest |
| 21:30 | | | | Stadium: Rapid-Giulești Stadium |

| 6 October 2024 | Botoșani | – | Rapid București | Botoșani |
| 18:15 | | | | Stadium: Botoșani Municipal Stadium |

| 21 October 2024 | Rapid București | – | Farul Constanța | Bucharest |
| 21:00 | | | | Stadium: Rapid-Giulești Stadium |

| 27 October 2024 | FCSB | – | Rapid București | Bucharest |
| 21:00 | | | | Stadium: Arena Națională |

| 4 November 2024 | Rapid București | – | Hermannstadt | Bucharest |
| 21:00 | | | | Stadium: Rapid-Giulești Stadium |

| 9 November 2024 | Rapid București | – | UTA Arad | Bucharest |
| 21:00 | | | | Stadium: Rapid-Giulești Stadium |

| 23 November 2024 | CFR Cluj | – | Rapid București | Cluj-Napoca |
| 21:30 | | | | Stadium: Dr. Constantin Rădulescu Stadium |

| 29 November 2024 | Rapid București | – | Petrolul Ploiești | Bucharest |
| 20:45 | | | | Stadium: Rapid-Giulești Stadium |

| 6 December 2024 | Sepsi OSK | – | Rapid București | Sfântu Gheorghe |
| 20:00 | | | | Stadium: Sepsi Arena Stadium |

| 16 December 2024 | Rapid București | – | Gloria Buzău | Bucharest |
| 20:00 | | | | Stadium: Rapid-Giulești Stadium |

| 22 December 2024 | Dinamo București | – | Rapid București | Bucharest |
| 20:00 | | | | Stadium: Arena Națională |
