= Luka Gojković =

Serbian footballer (born 2001)

Personal information
- Date of birth: 28 November 1999 (age 26)
- Place of birth: Belgrade, FR Yugoslavia
- Height: 1.76 m (5 ft 9 in)
- Position: Midfielder

Team information
- Current team: Rapid București
- Number: 28

Youth career
- –2018: BSK Borča
- 2018: → Voždovac (loan)

Senior career*
Years	Team	Apps	(Gls)
2018–2020	BSK Borča		
2020	OFK Bačka	0	(0)
2020–2021	IMT	3	(0)
2021–2022	Rad	44	(13)
2022–2024	Javor Ivanjica	70	(9)
2024–	Rapid București	33	(1)
2026	→ UTA Arad (loan)	5	(0)
- * Club domestic league appearances and goals as of 15 February 2026

Luka Gojković (Serbian Cyrillic: Лука Гојковић; born 28 November 1999) is a Serbian professional footballer who plays as a midfielder for Liga I club Rapid București.

== Club career ==
Gojković start his career in the youth ranks of BSK Borča, where he was also featured in the first team in the Serbian League Belgrade. He signed a contract with Serbian SuperLiga club OFK Bačka in the summer of 2020. He did not get the opportunity to debut there and later moved to IMT, and from there at the half of the season 2020–21 to Rad. In the summer of 2022, he signed a three-and-a-half-year contract with Javor Ivanjica. After two years with Javor, he signed in the summer of 2024 with Romanian Liga I club Rapid București.

== Career statistics ==
As of match played 15 February 2026

Appearances and goals by club, season and competition
Club	Season	League			National cup (Note: Includes Serbian Cup, Cupa României)		Europe		Other		Total	
Club	Season	Division	Apps	Goals	Apps	Goals	Apps	Goals	Apps	Goals	Apps	Goals
BSK Borča	2018–19	Serbian League Belgrade	?	?	?	?	—		—		?	?
BSK Borča	2019–20	Serbian League Belgrade	?	?	?	?	—		—		?	?
BSK Borča	Total		?	?	?	?	—		—		?	?
OFK Bačka	2020–21	Serbian SuperLiga	0	0	—		—		—		0	0
IMT	2020–21	Serbian First League	3	0	0	0	—		—		3	0
Rad	2020–21	Serbian SuperLiga	8	2	—		—		—		8	2
Rad	2021–22	Serbian First League	36	11	3	1	—		—		39	12
Rad	Total		44	13	3	1	—		—		47	14
Javor Ivanjica	2022–23	Serbian SuperLiga	34	6	0	0	—		—		34	6
Javor Ivanjica	2023–24	Serbian SuperLiga	36	3	2	0	—		2 (Note: Appearances in Serbian SuperLiga promotion/relegation play-offs)	0	40	3
Javor Ivanjica	Total		70	9	2	0	—		2	0	74	9
Rapid București	2024–25	Liga I	20	1	3	0	—		—		23	1
Rapid București	2025–26	Liga I	13	0	2	0	—		—		15	0
Rapid București	2026–27	Liga I	0	0	0	0	—		—		0	0
Rapid București	Total		33	1	5	0	—		—		38	1
UTA Arad (loan)	2025–26	Liga I	5	0	1	0	—		—		6	0
Career total			155	23	11	1	—		2	0	168	24
