= Ștefan Pănoiu =

Romanian footballer

Personal information
- Full name: Ștefan Călin Pănoiu
- Date of birth: 23 September 2002 (age 24)
- Place of birth: Râmnicu Vâlcea, Romania
- Height: 1.77 m (5 ft 10 in)
- Position: Central midfielder

Team information
- Current team: Concordia Chiajna
- Number: 17

Youth career
- 2008–2017: Hidro Râmnicu Vâlcea
- 2017–2018: SCM Râmnicu Vâlcea
- 2018–2019: Rapid București

Senior career*
Years	Team	Apps	(Gls)
2019–2024	Rapid București	115	(7)
2024	→ Universitatea Cluj (loan)	8	(0)
2024–2026	Botoșani	16	(0)
2026–	Concordia Chiajna	4	(1)

International career
2021	Romania U19	1	(0)
2021–2023	Romania U20	11	(0)
2023	Romania U21	1	(0)
- * Club domestic league appearances and goals as of 1 November 2026

Ștefan Călin Pănoiu (born 23 September 2002) is a Romanian professional footballer who plays as a central midfielder for Liga II club Concordia Chiajna.

== Club career ==
=== Rapid București ===
He made his Liga I debut for Rapid București against Chindia Targoviste on 18 July 2021.

=== Universitatea Cluj ===
On 16 January 2024, he was sent on a loan to U Cluj for one-year-and-a-half season. After failing to convince at the Transilvanian group with only 8 matches played, he returned to Rapid for the next season.

== Career statistics ==
As of match played 1 November 2026

Appearances and goals by club, season and competition
Club	Season	League			Cupa României		Europe		Other		Total	
Club	Season	Division	Apps	Goals	Apps	Goals	Apps	Goals	Apps	Goals	Apps	Goals
Rapid București	2018–19	Liga III	4	0	—		—		—		4	0
Rapid București	2019–20	Liga II	12	0	3	0	—		—		15	0
Rapid București	2020–21	Liga II	26	3	0	0	—		—		26	3
Rapid București	2021–22	Liga I	24	1	1	0	—		—		25	1
Rapid București	2022–23	Liga I	37	3	4	0	—		—		41	3
Rapid București	2023–24	Liga I	12	0	3	1	—		—		15	1
Rapid București	Total		115	7	11	1	0	0	0	0	126	8
Universitatea Cluj (loan)	2023–24	Liga I	8	0	0	0	—		—		8	0
Botoșani	2024–25	Liga I	5	0	3	0	—		—		8	0
Botoșani	2025–26	Liga I	11	0	3	0	—		1 (Note: Appearances in Liga I European play-offs)	0	15	0
Botoșani	Total		16	0	6	0	—		1	0	23	0
Concordia Chiajna	2026–27	Liga II	4	1	0	0	—		—		4	1
Career total			143	8	17	1	0	0	1	0	161	9

== Honours ==
Rapid București

- Liga III: 2018–19
