= Andrei Borza =

Romanian footballer (born 2005)

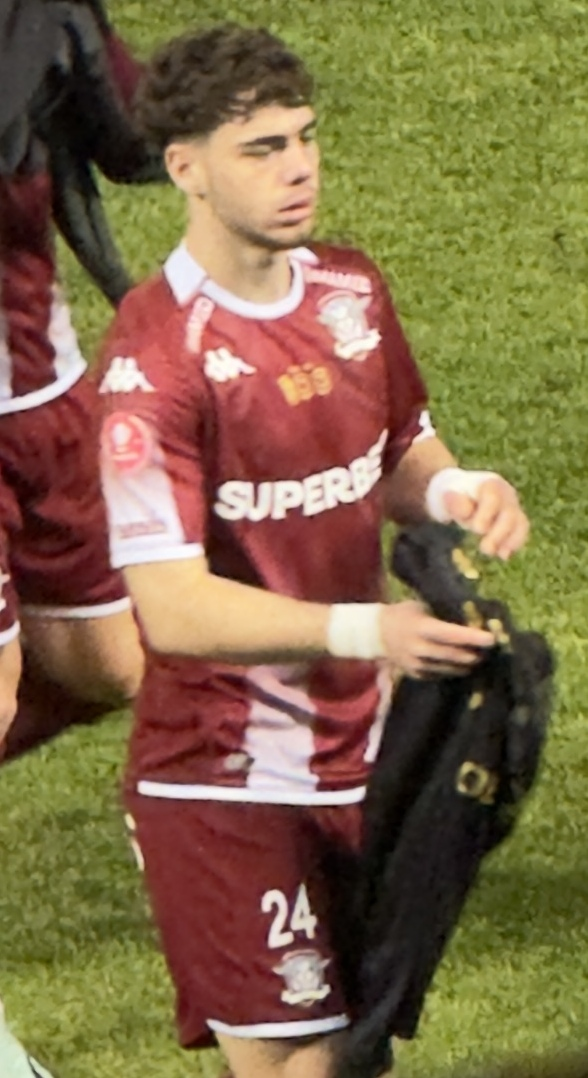
- Borza with Rapid București in 2023

Personal information
- Full name: Sebastian Andrei Borza
- Date of birth: 12 November 2005 (age 21)
- Place of birth: Năvodari, Romania
- Height: 1.80 m (5 ft 11 in)
- Position: Left-back

Team information
- Current team: Çorum
- Number: 24

Youth career
- 2011–2022: Gheorghe Hagi Academy

Senior career*
Years	Team	Apps	(Gls)
2022–2023	Farul Constanța	36	(3)
2023–2026	Rapid București	93	(3)
2026–	Çorum	10	(1)

International career^{‡}
2019	Romania U15	8	(0)
2020–2021	Romania U16	7	(0)
2021–2022	Romania U17	8	(2)
2022–2024	Romania U19	9	(2)
2022–2024	Romania U20	4	(0)
2023–2026	Romania U21	16	(2)
2026–	Romania	3	(0)
- * Club domestic league appearances and goals as of 8 November 2026 ‡ National team caps and goals as of 2 October 2026

Sebastian Andrei Borza (born 12 November 2005) is a Romanian professional footballer who plays as a left-back for Süper Lig club Çorum and the Romania national team.

A product of Farul Constanța's academy, Borza made his senior debut in 2022 and won the Liga I title in his second season at the club. He joined fellow league team Rapid București in the summer of 2023, before moving abroad to Turkish side Çorum three years later.

At international level, Borza represented Romania under-21 at the 2023 UEFA European Championship. He made his senior debut in June 2026, in a 1–1 friendly draw against Georgia.

== Club career ==
=== Farul Constanța ===
Borza made his Liga I debut for Farul Constanța on 1 May 2022, aged 16, starting in a 0–1 away loss to four-time defending champions CFR Cluj. On 28 October that year, he scored his first goal with a long-range shot in a 2–1 league win at FC U Craiova.

In the 2022–23 season, Borza appeared in 33 league games and scored three goals to aid Farul in winning the national title. He registered his debut in European competitions on 12 July 2023, starting in a 1–0 home victory over Sheriff Tiraspol in the UEFA Champions League first qualifying round.

=== Rapid București ===
On 15 August 2023, Rapid București announced the signing of Borza on a four-year deal. The transfer fee was revealed to be worth €800,000 plus 10% interest on a future sale. He made his debut five days later, in a 3–1 home victory over his former club Farul Constanța.

On 15 December 2023, Borza received the first red card of his career in a goalless Primvs derby draw away to Petrolul Ploiești. On 25 February 2024, he and teammate Alexandru Albu were dropped from the squad for attending a nightclub following a 3–1 loss to Politehnica Iași, with the sanction later confirmed as a one-match suspension.

Borza scored his first goal for Rapid on 21 October 2024, in a 5–0 home Liga I win also against his former team Farul Constanța.

=== Çorum ===
On 24 July 2026, Borza joined Turkish club Çorum, newly promoted to the Süper Lig, on a four-year contract with the option of a further year. The €2.2 million transfer fee reportedly made him the team's record signing.

== International career ==
On 15 June 2023, Borza was selected by manager Emil Săndoi in the Romania under-21 squad for the 2023 UEFA European Championship. He only played in the opening 0–3 loss to Spain, being an unused substitute in the other two group games.

Borza made his senior international debut for Romania on 2 June 2026, starting in a 1–1 friendly draw with Georgia before being substituted at half-time.

== Career statistics ==
=== Club ===
As of match played 8 November 2026

Appearances and goals by club, season and competition
Club	Season	League			Cupa României		Europe		Other		Total	
Club	Season	Division	Apps	Goals	Apps	Goals	Apps	Goals	Apps	Goals	Apps	Goals
Farul Constanța	2021–22	Liga I	3	0	0	0	—		—		3	0
Farul Constanța	2022–23	Liga I	33	3	3	0	—		—		36	3
Farul Constanța	2023–24	Liga I	0	0	—		5 (Note: Two appearances in UEFA Champions League, three appearances in UEFA Europa Conference League)	0	1 (Note: Appearance in Supercupa României)	0	6	0
Farul Constanța	Total		36	3	3	0	5	0	1	0	45	3
Rapid București	2023–24	Liga I	29	0	3	0	—		—		32	0
Rapid București	2024–25	Liga I	34	1	3	0	—		—		37	1
Rapid București	2025–26	Liga I	29	2	1	0	—		—		30	2
Rapid București	2026–27	Liga I	1	0	—		—		—		1	0
Rapid București	Total		93	3	7	0	—		—		100	3
Çorum	2026–27	Süper Lig	10	1	0	0	—		—		10	1
Career total			139	7	10	0	5	0	1	0	155	7

=== International ===
As of match played 2 October 2026

Appearances and goals by national team and year
National team	Year	Apps	Goals
Romania
Romania	2026	3	0
Total		3	0

== Honours ==
Farul Constanța

- Liga I: 2022–23
- Supercupa României runner-up: 2023

Individual

- Liga I Team of the Season: 2022–23
