= Horațiu Moldovan =

Romanian footballer (born 1998)

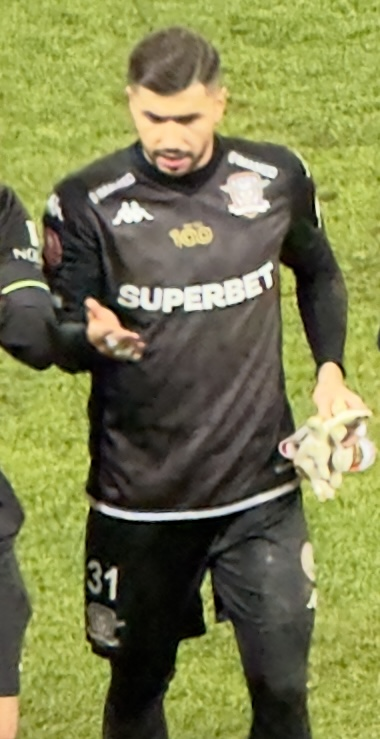
- Moldovan with Rapid București in 2023

Personal information
- Full name: Horațiu Alexandru Moldovan
- Date of birth: 20 January 1998 (age 28)
- Place of birth: Cluj-Napoca, Romania
- Height: 1.89 m (6 ft 2 in)
- Position: Goalkeeper

Team information
- Current team: Eyüpspor (on loan from Atlético Madrid)
- Number: 31

Youth career
- –2008: Școala de Fotbal Ivansuc Cluj
- 2008–2013: CFR Cluj
- 2013: Ardealul Cluj
- 2013–2016: CFR Cluj

Senior career*
Years	Team	Apps	(Gls)
2017–2019	CFR Cluj	0	(0)
2017–2018	→ Hermannstadt (loan)	16	(0)
2018	→ Voința Turnu Măgurele (loan)		
2018	→ Energeticianul (loan)	5	(0)
2019	Ripensia Timișoara	15	(0)
2019–2020	Sepsi OSK	0	(0)
2020	Ripensia Timișoara	3	(0)
2020–2021	UTA Arad	4	(0)
2021–2024	Rapid București	112	(0)
2024–	Atlético Madrid	0	(0)
2024–2025	→ Sassuolo (loan)	27	(0)
2025–2026	→ Oviedo (loan)	2	(0)
2026–	→ Eyüpspor (loan)	7	(0)

International career^{‡}
2022–	Romania	16	(0)
- * Club domestic league appearances and goals as of 12 October 2026 ‡ National team caps and goals as of 9 September 2025

Horațiu Alexandru Moldovan (Romanian pronunciation: [hoˈrat͡sju alekˈsandru moldoˈvan]; born 20 January 1998) is a Romanian professional footballer who plays as a goalkeeper for Süper Lig club Eyüpspor, on loan from La Liga club Atlético Madrid and the Romania national team.

A youth product of his hometown club CFR Cluj, Moldovan briefly represented several sides during the first part of his career before becoming a starter at Rapid București in 2021. Three years later, his performances inspired a transfer to Spanish team Atlético Madrid.

Internationally, Moldovan earned his first cap for Romania in November 2022, in a 2–1 friendly loss to Slovenia. He represented the country in the UEFA Euro 2024.

== Early life ==
Before turning to junior football, Moldovan was passionate about kart racing, engines and speed. He stated that he saw his first football at age seven, and "From that moment on, football was everything".

== Club career ==
=== Early career ===
Moldovan spent a large part of his junior career at his hometown side CFR Cluj, but did not make his senior debut there and was instead loaned out to Hermannstadt, Voința Turnu Măgurele, and Energeticianul, respectively. Between 2019 and 2020, Moldovan had a series of transfers; he initially signed for Ripensia Timișoara, then moved to Sepsi OSK, and subsequently returned to Ripensia Timișoara.

=== UTA Arad ===
On 10 August 2020, Moldovan joined UTA Arad. Twelve days later, he made his Liga I debut in a 1–1 away draw at Viitorul Constanța. He assumed a substitute role at the team, only recording three additional appearances throughout the remainder of his spell.

=== Rapid București ===
On 6 January 2021, Moldovan moved to Liga II side Rapid București on a one-and-a-half-year contract, establishing himself as a regular starter. After Rapid's promotion to the top tier, he played 37 league matches and kept 11 clean sheets in the 2021–22 season, his consistency aiding the team to finish ninth overall.

On 14 December 2022, Moldovan saved a penalty kick in a 3–1 derby win over Petrolul Ploiești. On 21 May 2023, he agreed to a one-year contract extension lasting until the summer of 2025. On 21 December that year, the Gazeta Sporturilor newspaper announced that Moldovan came fourth in voting for the 2023 Romanian Footballer of the Year award.

=== Atlético Madrid ===
On 24 January 2024, Moldovan transferred to La Liga club Atlético Madrid for a €800,000 fee, representing his release clause. He signed a three-and-a-half-year contract and was assigned the number 1 shirt. Moldovan did not record his debut by the end of the 2023–24 season, being considered a backup option for Jan Oblak.

==== Loan to Sassuolo ====
On 23 August 2024, Moldovan was loaned to Serie B side Sassuolo for one season. Upon his arrival, he quickly became the starting goalkeeper and helped the club win the league and achieve promotion to the Serie A in just one season after relegation. On one occasion, the away league game against Modena played on 12 April 2025, he was team's captain. However, this was also his last game for the club as he would be benched for the remaining five games of the season.

==== Loan to Oviedo ====
On 18 July 2025, Moldovan agreed to a one-year loan deal with Real Oviedo, also in the Spanish top tier.

==== Loan to Eyüpspor ====
On 14 July 2026, he was loaned again to the Süper Lig club, Eyüpspor, for a season.

== International career ==
On 17 November 2022, Moldovan made his debut for the Romania national team in a 2–1 friendly loss to Slovenia at Cluj Arena. The following year, he appeared in eight matches of the UEFA Euro 2024 qualifiers, aiding his nation in winning its group undefeated.

On 7 June 2024, Moldovan was named in Romania's squad for Euro 2024. However, he lost his starter status to Florin Niță due to his complete lack of playing time at Atlético Madrid, as the country won its group but was eliminated by the Netherlands in the round of 16.

== Career statistics ==
=== Club ===
As of match played 12 October 2026

Appearances and goals by club, season and competition
Club	Season	League			National cup (Note: Includes Cupa României, Copa del Rey)		Europe		Other		Total	
Club	Season	Division	Apps	Goals	Apps	Goals	Apps	Goals	Apps	Goals	Apps	Goals
Hermannstadt (loan)	2016–17	Liga III	13	0	—		—		—		13	0
Hermannstadt (loan)	2017–18	Liga II	3	0	2	0	—		—		5	0
Hermannstadt (loan)	Total		16	0	2	0	—		—		18	0
Voința Turnu Măgurele (loan)	2017–18	Liga III	?	?	—		—		—		?	?
Energeticianul (loan)	2018–19	Liga II	5	0	1	0	—		—		6	0
Ripensia Timișoara	2018–19	Liga II	15	0	0	0	—		—		15	0
Sepsi OSK	2019–20	Liga I	0	0	0	0	—		—		4	0
Ripensia Timișoara	2019–20	Liga II	3	0	—		—		—		3	0
UTA Arad	2020–21	Liga I	4	0	0	0	—		—		4	0
Rapid București	2020–21	Liga II	14	0	—		—		—		14	0
Rapid București	2021–22	Liga I	37	0	0	0	—		—		37	0
Rapid București	2022–23	Liga I	39	0	0	0	—		—		39	0
Rapid București	2023–24	Liga I	22	0	1	0	—		—		23	0
Rapid București	Total		112	0	1	0	—		—		113	0
Atlético Madrid	2023–24	La Liga	0	0	0	0	0	0	—		0	0
Sassuolo (loan)	2024–25	Serie B	27	0	0	0	—		—		27	0
Oviedo (loan)	2025–26	La Liga	2	0	1	0	—		—		3	0
Eyüpspor (loan)	2026–27	Süper Lig	7	0	0	0	—		—		7	0
Career total			191	0	5	0	0	0	0	0	196	0

=== International ===
As of match played 9 September 2025

Appearances and goals by national team and year
National team	Year	Apps	Goals
Romania
Romania	2022	1	0
Romania	2023	8	0
Romania	2024	2	0
Romania	2025	5	0
Total		16	0

== Honours ==
Hermannstadt

- Liga III: 2016–17

Sassuolo

- Serie B: 2024–25

Individual

- Gazeta Sporturilor Romanian Footballer of the Year fourth place: 2023
- Gazeta Sporturilor Romania Player of the Month: November 2023
