= Alexandru Albu =

Romanian footballer (born 1993)

Personal information
- Full name: Alexandru Cristian Albu
- Date of birth: 17 August 1993 (age 33)
- Place of birth: Bucharest, Romania
- Height: 1.86 m (6 ft 1 in)
- Positions: Defensive midfielder; defender

Team information
- Current team: CSA Steaua București
- Number: 34

Youth career
- 2002–2004: Palatul Național
- 2004–2009: Inter Sport
- 2009–2011: Unirea Urziceni
- 2011–2012: Concordia Chiajna

Senior career*
Years	Team	Apps	(Gls)
2012–2016	Concordia II Chiajna		
2015–2022	Concordia Chiajna	119	(9)
2020	→ Academica Clinceni (loan)	16	(2)
2020–2021	→ UTA Arad (loan)	36	(2)
2021–2022	→ Rapid București (loan)	34	(7)
2022–2024	Rapid București	61	(3)
2024	Al-Hazem	3	(0)
2024	Al-Safa	11	(0)
2025	Botoșani	0	(0)
2025	Chindia Târgoviște	14	(4)
2026	Unirea Slobozia	17	(3)
2026–	CSA Steaua București	12	(1)

International career
2021	Romania	1	(0)
- * Club domestic league appearances and goals as of 30 October 2026

Alexandru Cristian Albu (Romanian pronunciation: [alekˈsandru kristiˈan ˈalbu]; born 17 August 1993) is a Romanian professional footballer who plays as a defensive midfielder or a defender for Liga II club CSA Steaua București.

Albu started out his professional career at Concordia Chiajna in 2015, where he spent several seasons playing in the Liga I before relegating to the second division. Following loans to Academica Clinceni, UTA Arad, and Rapid București, respectively, he signed a permanent contract with the latter in 2021.

Internationally, Albu made his senior debut for Romania in October 2021, in a 2–1 away FIFA World Cup qualifier loss to Germany.

== Early life ==
Albu was born in Bucharest and is of Romani ethnicity. He grew up supporting Steaua București.

== Club career ==
=== Concordia Chiajna ===
Albu made his professional debut for Concordia Chiajna on 1 May 2015, coming on as an 89th-minute substitute for Hristijan Dragarski in a 1–0 home Liga I win over Pandurii Târgu Jiu. He became a regular starter for the club in the 2016–17 season, and on 7 September 2016 scored his first goal in a 2–1 Cupa Ligii loss to ACS Poli Timișoara.

On 4 March 2017, Albu recorded his first league goal in a 1–1 draw against the same opponent. He amassed totals of 99 appearances and three goals in the top flight for "the Green Eagles", before relegating to the Liga II at the end of the 2018–19 campaign.

==== Various loans ====
In January 2020, Albu returned to the Liga I by signing for newly-promoted Academica Clinceni on loan for the remainder of the season. On 16 August, he moved to UTA Arad on a one-year loan.

On 16 June 2021, Albu was loaned again to Rapid București, totalling 36 games and a career-best seven goals in all competitions during the 2021–22 season.

=== Rapid București ===
In the summer of 2022, Albu joined Rapid București on a permanent basis after the team paid a previously-agreed €150,000 to Concordia Chiajna. On 23 April 2023, he scored the only goal of a home derby victory over FCSB in the Liga I.

On 25 February 2024, he and his teammate Andrei Borza were expelled from the squad for an undetermined period—later revealed as one match—because they partied in a nightclub after a 3–1 loss to Politehnica Iași.

== International career ==
Albu made his debut for the Romania national team on 8 October 2021, coming on as an 82nd-minute substitute for Nicolae Stanciu in a 2–1 away loss to Germany counting for the 2022 FIFA World Cup qualifiers.

== Style of play ==
Albu played as a defender during the first part of his career, mostly as a centre-back, and later developed into a defensive midfielder.

== Career statistics ==
=== Club ===
As of match played 30 October 2026

Appearances and goals by club, season and competition
Club	Season	League			National cup (Note: Includes Cupa României, King's Cup)		League cup (Note: Includes Cupa Ligii)		Continental		Other		Total	
Club	Season	Division	Apps	Goals	Apps	Goals	Apps	Goals	Apps	Goals	Apps	Goals	Apps	Goals
Concordia Chiajna	2014–15	Liga I	1	0	0	0	—		—		—		1	0
Concordia Chiajna	2016–17	Liga I	35	2	0	0	2	1	—		—		37	3
Concordia Chiajna	2017–18	Liga I	38	0	1	0	—		—		—		39	0
Concordia Chiajna	2018–19	Liga I	25	1	0	0	—		—		—		25	1
Concordia Chiajna	2019–20	Liga II	20	6	1	0	—		—		—		21	6
Concordia Chiajna	Total		119	9	2	0	2	1	—		—		123	10
Academica Clinceni (loan)	2019–20	Liga I	16	2	1	0	—		—		—		17	2
UTA Arad (loan)	2020–21	Liga I	36	2	1	0	—		—		—		37	2
Rapid București (loan)	2021–22	Liga I	34	7	2	0	—		—		—		36	7
Rapid București	2022–23	Liga I	32	3	3	2	—		—		—		35	5
Rapid București	2023–24	Liga I	29	0	3	0	—		—		—		32	0
Rapid București	Total		95	10	8	2	—		—		—		103	12
Al-Hazem	2024–25	Saudi First Division League	3	0	—		—		—		—		3	0
Al-Safa	2024–25	Saudi First Division League	11	0	1	0	—		—		—		12	0
Botoșani	2024–25	Liga I	0	0	—		—		—		—		0	0
Chindia Târgoviște	2025–26	Liga II	14	4	2	0	—		—		—		16	4
Unirea Slobozia	2025–26	Liga I	17	3	—		—		—		—		17	3
CSA Steaua București	2026–27	Liga II	12	1	1	0	—		—		—		13	1
Career total			323	31	16	2	2	1	—		—		341	34

=== International ===
As of match played 8 October 2021

Appearances and goals by national team and year
National team	Year	Apps	Goals
Romania	2021	1	0
Total		1	0

== Honours ==
Concordia Chiajna

- Cupa Ligii runner-up: 2015–16
