= Júnior Morais =

Brazilian footballer (born 1986)

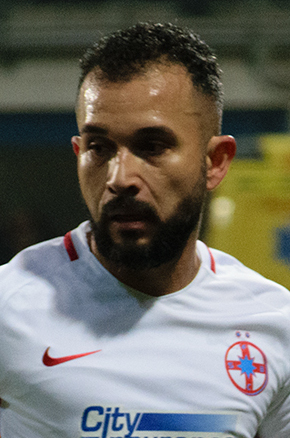
- Morais with FCSB in 2017

Personal information
- Full name: Iraneuton Sousa Morais Júnior
- Date of birth: 22 July 1986 (age 40)
- Place of birth: São Luís, Brazil
- Height: 1.76 m (5 ft 9 in)
- Position: Left-back

Team information
- Current team: Metaloglobus București
- Number: 12

Youth career
- 1998–2006: São Cristóvão

Senior career*
| Years | Team | Apps | (Gls) |
| 2006–2009 | São Cristóvão | 81 | (5) |
| 2009–2010 | Freamunde | 32 | (3) |
| 2011–2017 | Astra Giurgiu | 198 | (6) |
| 2017–2019 | FCSB | 49 | (0) |
| 2019–2021 | Gaziantep | 51 | (0) |
| 2021–2023 | Rapid București | 71 | (4) |
| 2023–2024 | Gaziantep | 15 | (0) |
| 2024– | Metaloglobus București | 37 | (0) |
- * Club domestic league appearances and goals as of 26 October 2026

Iraneuton Sousa Morais Júnior (born 22 July 1986), known as Júnior Morais or Júnior Maranhão, is a Brazilian professional footballer who plays as a left-back for Liga II club Metaloglobus București, which he captains.

Morais began his senior career with São Cristóvão and Freamunde, before moving to Romania in 2011 to join Astra Ploiești. Over six and a half seasons, he made 198 Liga I appearances and won four domestic trophies, including the 2015–16 national title. Morais subsequently represented FCSB, Gaziantep, and Rapid București. In 2024, he joined Metaloglobus București in the Romanian second division, helping them secure a historic promotion to the top flight in his debut season.

During his time in Romania, Morais became one of the few foreign players to surpass 300 Liga I appearances, ranking third on the all-time list behind Camora and Takayuki Seto.

== Career ==
=== Early career ===
Morais began his senior career in his native Brazil with São Cristóvão. In 2009, he moved to Europe and signed with Portuguese club Freamunde, where he made 32 appearances and scored three goals in the Liga de Honra over a year-and-a-half spell.

=== Astra Giurgiu ===
In January 2011, Morais transferred to Romanian club Astra Ploiești, which was later relocated and renamed Astra Giurgiu. Over the course of six and a half seasons, he established himself as a key player, totalling 256 matches and eight goals in all competitions.

During his stint, Morais helped the club win four domestic trophies—the 2015–16 Liga I title, the 2013–14 Cupa României, and the Supercupa României in 2014 and 2016.

=== FCSB ===
In the summer of 2017, Morais remained in Romania's top tier by signing with capital club FCSB. He spent two full campaigns with the team, accumulating 49 league appearances before departing in 2019.

=== Gaziantep ===
Morais transferred to Turkish club Gaziantep in July 2019, where he reunited with his former Astra manager Marius Șumudică. He made 51 Süper Lig appearances across two seasons in Turkey.

=== Rapid București ===
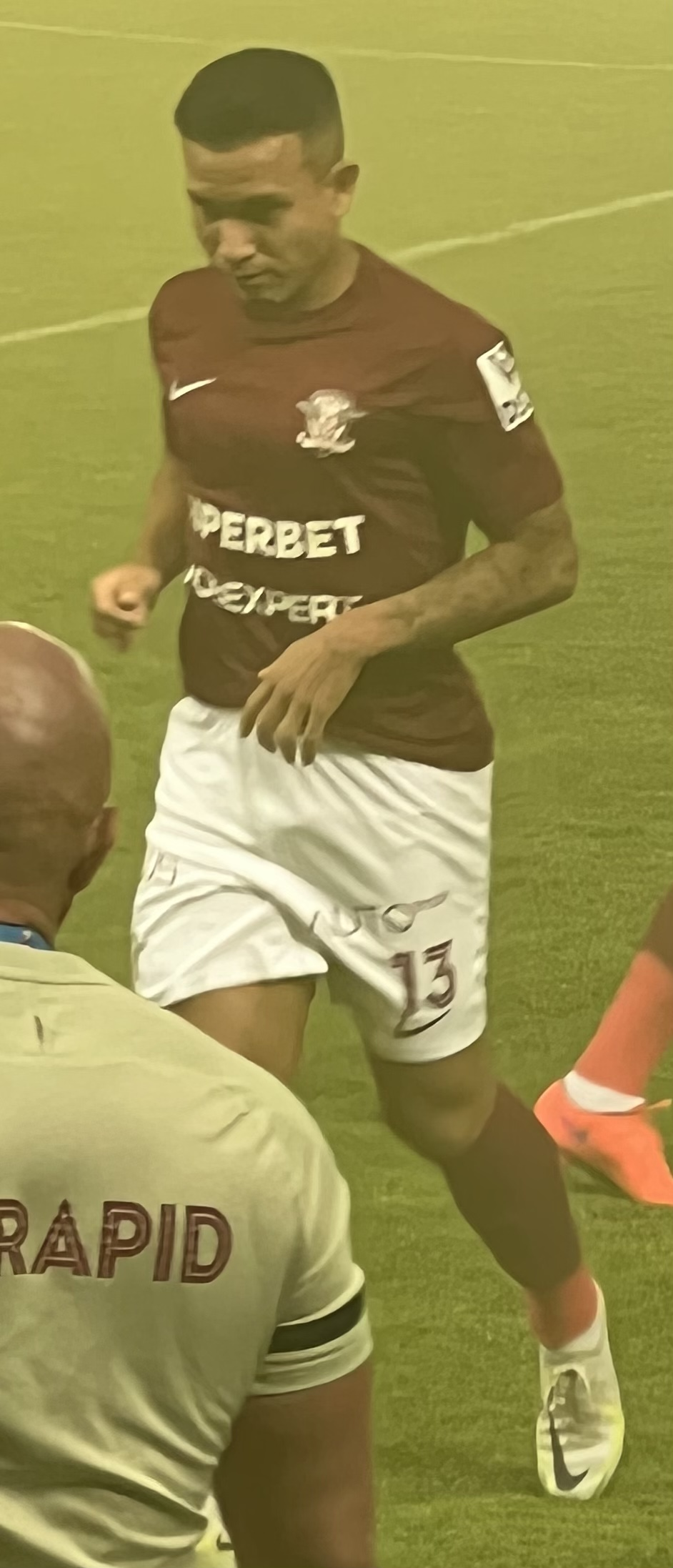
Morais playing for Rapid București in August 2022

In 2021, aged nearly 35, Morais returned to Romania to sign with Rapid București. He spent two seasons as a regular starter at left-back, making 71 league appearances and scoring four goals.

=== Late career ===
In September 2023, Morais rejoined Gaziantep for a brief second spell, featuring in 15 Süper Lig matches during the 2023–24 campaign. In August 2024, he moved back to Bucharest to sign with Liga II side Metaloglobus București.

Morais recorded 26 appearances for Metaloglobus during the 2024–25 season, helping the club secure a historic promotion to the Romanian top flight. Despite missing subsequent game time due to a long-term knee meniscus injury that required surgery, Morais opted against retirement and extended his contract with the club until June 2027.

== Personal life ==
In 2015, Morais married Romanian handball player Andreea Dospin. They have two children together, a daughter and a son; his former Astra teammate Constantin Budescu serves as their godfather. Despite earlier media speculation, Morais clarified in October 2020 that he does not hold Romanian citizenship.

== Career statistics ==
=== Club ===
As of match played 26 October 2026

Appearances and goals by club, season and competition
| Club | Season | League | | | National cup (Note: Includes Taça de Portugal, Cupa României, Turkish Cup) | | League cup (Note: Includes Taça da Liga, Cupa României) | | Continental | | Other | | Total | |
| Club | Season | Division | Apps | Goals | Apps | Goals | Apps | Goals | Apps | Goals | Apps | Goals | Apps | Goals |
|---|---|---|---|---|---|---|---|---|---|---|---|---|---|---|
| São Cristóvão | 2006 | Campeonato Carioca | | | — | | — | | — | | — | | | |
| São Cristóvão | 2007 | Campeonato Carioca | | | — | | — | | — | | — | | | |
| São Cristóvão | 2008 | Campeonato Carioca | | | — | | — | | — | | — | | | |
| São Cristóvão | 2009 | Campeonato Carioca | | | — | | — | | — | | — | | | |
| São Cristóvão | Total | | 81 | 5 | — | | — | | — | | — | | 81 | 5 |
| Freamunde | 2009–10 | Liga de Honra | 19 | 2 | 2 | 1 | 0 | 0 | — | | — | | 21 | 3 |
| Freamunde | 2010–11 | Liga de Honra | 13 | 1 | 0 | 0 | 3 | 0 | — | | — | | 16 | 1 |
| Freamunde | Total | | 32 | 3 | 2 | 1 | 3 | 0 | — | | — | | 37 | 4 |
| Astra Giurgiu | 2010–11 | Liga I | 14 | 0 | — | | — | | — | | — | | 14 | 0 |
| Astra Giurgiu | 2011–12 | Liga I | 31 | 0 | 1 | 0 | — | | — | | — | | 32 | 0 |
| Astra Giurgiu | 2012–13 | Liga I | 33 | 3 | 5 | 0 | — | | — | | — | | 38 | 3 |
| Astra Giurgiu | 2013–14 | Liga I | 33 | 2 | 5 | 1 | 0 | 0 | 8 (Note: Appearances in UEFA Europa League) | 0 | — | | 46 | 3 |
| Astra Giurgiu | 2014–15 | Liga I | 29 | 0 | 0 | 0 | 4 | 0 | 10 | 0 | 1 (Note: Appearance in Supercupa României) | 0 | 44 | 0 |
| Astra Giurgiu | 2015–16 | Liga I | 29 | 1 | 1 | 0 | 1 | 0 | 6 | 0 | — | | 37 | 1 |
| Astra Giurgiu | 2016–17 | Liga I | 29 | 0 | 4 | 1 | 0 | 0 | 11 (Note: Two appearances in UEFA Champions League, nine appearances in UEFA Europa League) | 0 | 1 | 0 | 45 | 1 |
| Astra Giurgiu | Total | | 198 | 6 | 16 | 2 | 5 | 0 | 35 | 0 | 2 | 0 | 256 | 8 |
| FCSB | 2017–18 | Liga I | 21 | 0 | 0 | 0 | — | | 11 (Note: Four appearances and one goal in UEFA Champions League, seven appearances and one goal in UEFA Europa League) | 2 | — | | 32 | 2 |
| FCSB | 2018–19 | Liga I | 28 | 0 | 2 | 0 | — | | 4 | 0 | — | | 34 | 0 |
| FCSB | Total | | 49 | 0 | 2 | 0 | — | | 15 | 2 | — | | 66 | 2 |
| Gaziantep | 2019–20 | Süper Lig | 29 | 0 | 1 | 0 | — | | — | | — | | 30 | 0 |
| Gaziantep | 2020–21 | Süper Lig | 22 | 0 | 1 | 0 | — | | — | | — | | 23 | 0 |
| Gaziantep | Total | | 51 | 0 | 2 | 0 | — | | — | | — | | 53 | 0 |
| Rapid București | 2021–22 | Liga I | 34 | 2 | 1 | 0 | — | | – | | — | | 35 | 2 |
| Rapid București | 2022–23 | Liga I | 36 | 2 | 1 | 0 | — | | — | | — | | 37 | 2 |
| Rapid București | 2023–24 | Liga I | 1 | 0 | — | | — | | — | | — | | 1 | 0 |
| Rapid București | Total | | 71 | 4 | 2 | 0 | — | | — | | — | | 73 | 4 |
| Gaziantep | 2023–24 | Süper Lig | 15 | 0 | 2 | 0 | — | | — | | — | | 17 | 0 |
| Metaloglobus București | 2024–25 | Liga II | 27 | 0 | 0 | 0 | — | | — | | 2 (Note: Appearances in Liga I promotion/relegation play-offs) | 0 | 29 | 0 |
| Metaloglobus București | 2025–26 | Liga I | 2 | 0 | 0 | 0 | — | | — | | — | | 2 | 0 |
| Metaloglobus București | 2026–27 | Liga II | 7 | 0 | 1 | 0 | — | | — | | — | | 8 | 0 |
| Metaloglobus București | Total | | 36 | 0 | 1 | 0 | — | | — | | 2 | 0 | 39 | 0 |
| Career total | | | 533 | 18 | 27 | 3 | 8 | 0 | 50 | 2 | 4 | 0 | 619 | 23 |

== Honours ==
Astra Giurgiu

- Liga I: 2015–16
- Cupa României: 2013–14
- Supercupa României: 2014, 2016
