= Virgil Drăghia =

Romanian footballer

Personal information
- Full name: Virgil Andrei Drăghia
- Date of birth: 31 July 1990 (age 36)
- Place of birth: Bucharest, Romania
- Height: 1.91 m (6 ft 3 in)
- Position: Goalkeeper

Team information
- Current team: Daco-Getica București
- Number: 90

Youth career
- 2001–2009: Rapid București

Senior career*
Years	Team	Apps	(Gls)
2009–2016	Rapid București	60	(0)
2011	→ Juventus București (loan)	8	(0)
2016–2017	Concordia Chiajna	5	(0)
2017–2018	Juventus București	24	(0)
2018	Voluntari	5	(0)
2018–2024	Rapid București	45	(0)
2024–	Daco-Getica București		

International career
2011	Romania U21	1	(0)
- * Club domestic league appearances and goals as of 24 April 2024

Virgil Andrei Drăghia (born 31 July 1990) is a Romanian professional footballer who plays as a goalkeeper for Liga IV club Daco-Getica București.

== Career statistics ==
As of match played 24 April 2024

Appearances and goals by club, season and competition
Club	Season	League			Cupa României		Cupa Ligii		Continental		Total	
Club	Season	Division	Apps	Goals	Apps	Goals	Apps	Goals	Apps	Goals	Apps	Goals
Juventus București (loan)	2010–11	Liga II	8	0	—		—		—		8	0
Rapid București	2011–12	Liga I	0	0	0	0	—		1 (Note: Appearance in UEFA Europa League)	0	1	0
Rapid București	2012–13	Liga I	4	0	0	0	—		—		4	0
Rapid București	2013–14	Liga I	2	0	2	0	—		—		4	0
Rapid București	2014–15	Liga I	4	0	1	0	2	0	—		7	0
Rapid București	2015–16	Liga II	20	0	0	0	—		—		20	0
Rapid București	Total		30	0	3	0	2	0	1	0	35	0
Concordia Chiajna	2016–17	Liga I	5	0	0	0	0	0	—		5	0
Juventus București	2017–18	Liga I	24	0	0	0	—		—		24	0
Voluntari	2018–19	Liga I	5	0	0	0	—		—		5	0
Rapid București	2018–19	Liga III	19	0	—		—		—		19	0
Rapid București	2019–20	Liga II	7	0	1	0	—		—		8	0
Rapid București	2020–21	Liga II	15	0	0	0	—		—		15	0
Rapid București	2021–22	Liga I	2	0	2	0	—		—		4	0
Rapid București	2022–23	Liga I	1	0	4	0	—		—		5	0
Rapid București	2023–24	Liga I	1	0	2	0	—		—		3	0
Rapid București	Total		45	0	9	0	—		—		54	0
Career total			117	0	12	0	2	0	1	0	132	0

== Honours ==
Rapid București

- Liga II: 2015–16
- Liga III: 2018–19
