= Cristian Ignat =

Footballer (born 2003)

Personal information
- Date of birth: 29 January 2003 (age 23)
- Place of birth: Chișinău, Moldova
- Height: 1.94 m (6 ft 4 in)
- Position: Centre-back

Team information
- Current team: CFR Cluj
- Number: 21

Youth career
- CSCA Buiucani
- –2019: Juniorul București
- 2019–2021: Rapid București

Senior career*
Years	Team	Apps	(Gls)
2021–2026	Rapid București	31	(0)
2021	→ Unirea Constanța (loan)	0	(0)
2023–2024	→ Mioveni (loan)	25	(0)
2026	→ Petrolul Ploiești (loan)	7	(1)
2026–	CFR Cluj	4	(1)

International career^{‡}
2019	Moldova U17	4	(0)
2021	Romania U19	6	(0)
2022–2023	Romania U20	6	(0)
2023–2025	Romania U21	14	(0)
- * Club domestic league appearances and goals as of 31 October 2026 ‡ National team caps and goals as of 14 June 2025

Cristian Ignat (born 29 January 2003) is a professional footballer who plays as a centre-back for Liga I club CFR Cluj. Born in Moldova, he represents Romania at international level.

== Club career ==
Ignat made his Liga I debut on 14 December 2022 for Rapid București in a match against Petrolul Ploiești.

== Career statistics ==
As of match played 31 October 2026

Appearances and goals by club, season and competition
Club	Season	League			Cupa României		Europe		Other (Note: Appearances in Supercupa României)		Total	
Club	Season	Division	Apps	Goals	Apps	Goals	Apps	Goals	Apps	Goals	Apps	Goals
Rapid București	2020–21	Liga II	3	0	—		—		—		3	0
Rapid București	2022–23	Liga I	3	0	1	0	—		—		4	0
Rapid București	2024–25	Liga I	25	0	5	0	—		—		30	0
Rapid București	2025–26	Liga I	0	0	0	0	—		—		0	0
Rapid București	2026–27	Liga I	0	0	0	0	—		—		0	0
Rapid București	Total		31	0	6	0	—		—		37	0
Mioveni (loan)	2023–24	Liga II	25	0	2	1	—		2 (Note: Appearances in Liga I promotion/relegation play-offs)	0	29	1
Petrolul Ploiești (loan)	2025–26	Liga I	7	1	1	0	—		—		8	1
CFR Cluj	2026–27	Liga I	4	1	0	0	—		—		4	1
Career total			67	2	9	1	—		2	0	78	3
