= Antonio Sefer =

Romanian footballer (born 2002)

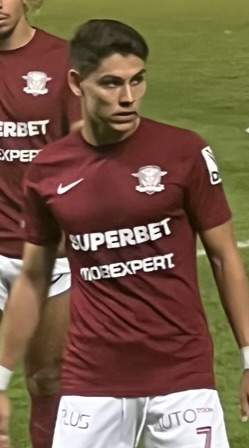
- Sefer with Rapid București in 2022

Personal information
- Full name: Antonio Valentin Sefer
- Date of birth: 22 April 2000 (age 26)
- Place of birth: Galați, Romania
- Height: 1.82 m (6 ft 0 in)
- Position: Winger

Team information
- Current team: Bnei Sakhnin (on loan from Maccabi Bnei Reineh)
- Number: 77

Youth career
- 2009–2015: Oțelul Galați
- 2017–2019: Groningen

Senior career*
Years	Team	Apps	(Gls)
2015–2016	Oțelul Galați	14	(1)
2019–2023	Rapid București	133	(18)
2023–2025	Hapoel Be'er Sheva	53	(10)
2025	→ Motor Lublin (loan)	6	(0)
2025–	Maccabi Bnei Reineh	19	(7)
2026–	→ Bnei Sakhnin (loan)	6	(0)

International career^{‡}
2016	Romania U15	1	(0)
2016	Romania U16	3	(2)
2016–2017	Romania U17	4	(0)
2017–2018	Romania U18	5	(2)
2018–2019	Romania U19	6	(4)
2021–2022	Romania U21	4	(0)
2021	Romania Olympic	5	(0)
2022	Romania	1	(0)
- * Club domestic league appearances and goals as of 7 November 2026 ‡ National team caps and goals as of 20 November 2022

Antonio Valentin Sefer (born 22 April 2000) is a Romanian professional footballer who plays as a winger for Israeli Premier League club Bnei Sakhnin, on loan from Liga Leumit club Maccabi Bnei Reineh.

== Club career ==
On 20 February 2019, Sefer signed a four-and-a-half-year contract with Rapid București.

On 12 June 2023, Sefer signed a four-year contract with Hapoel Be'er Sheva. On 23 January 2025, he joined Polish club Motor Lublin on loan for the remainder of the season, with an option to make the move permanent.

== International career ==
Sefer was selected in Romania's team for the football tournament at the 2020 Summer Olympics.

== Career statistics ==
=== Club ===
As of matches played 7 November 2026

Appearances and goals by club, season and competition
Club	Season	League			National cup (Note: Includes Cupa României, Israel State Cup)		Europe		Other		Total	
Club	Season	Division	Apps	Goals	Apps	Goals	Apps	Goals	Apps	Goals	Apps	Goals
Oțelul Galați	2015–16	Liga II	14	1	—		—		—		14	1
Rapid București	2018–19	Liga III	12	3	—		—		—		12	3
Rapid București	2019–20	Liga II	26	3	2	1	—		—		28	4
Rapid București	2020–21	Liga II	30	5	1	0	—		—		31	5
Rapid București	2021–22	Liga I	28	1	2	0	—		—		30	1
Rapid București	2022–23	Liga I	37	6	3	0	—		—		40	6
Rapid București	Total		133	18	8	1	—		—		141	19
Hapoel Be'er Sheva	2023–24	Israeli Premier League	35	7	4	0	2 (Note: Appearances in UEFA Conference League)	0	2 (Note: Appearances in Toto Cup)	1	43	8
Hapoel Be'er Sheva	2024–25	Israeli Premier League	18	3	2	2	2	0	—		22	5
Hapoel Be'er Sheva	Total		53	10	6	2	4	0	2	1	65	13
Motor Lublin (loan)	2024–25	Ekstraklasa	6	0	—		—		—		6	0
Maccabi Bnei Reineh	2025–26	Israeli Premier League	17	7	1	0	—		5	2	23	9
Maccabi Bnei Reineh	2026–27	Liga Leumit	2	0	—		—		—		2	0
Maccabi Bnei Reineh	Total		19	7	1	0	—		5	2	25	9
Maccabi Bnei Reineh (loan)	2026–27	Israeli Premier League	6	0	0	0	—		—		6	0
Career Total			231	36	15	3	4	0	7	3	257	42

=== International ===
As of match played 20 November 2022

Appearances and goals by national team and year
National team	Year	Apps	Goals
Romania
Romania	2022	1	0
Total		1	0

== Honours ==
Rapid București

- Liga III: 2018–19

Hapoel Be'er Sheva

- Israel State Cup runner-up: 2023–24
