= Xian Emmers =

Belgian footballer (born 1999)

Personal information
- Full name: Xian Ghislaine Emmers
- Date of birth: 20 July 1999 (age 27)
- Place of birth: Lugano, Switzerland
- Height: 1.78 m (5 ft 10 in)
- Position: Midfielder

Team information
- Current team: Argeș Pitești
- Number: 80

Youth career
- –2014: KFC Hamont 99
- 2014–2015: Genk
- 2015–2018: Inter Milan

Senior career*
Years	Team	Apps	(Gls)
2018–2021	Inter Milan	0	(0)
2018–2019	→ Cremonese (loan)	20	(1)
2019–2020	→ Waasland-Beveren (loan)	8	(0)
2020–2021	→ Almere City (loan)	16	(6)
2021–2022	Roda JC	38	(10)
2022–2025	Rapid București	52	(2)
2025	Phoenix Rising	15	(0)
2026–	Argeș Pitești	11	(0)

International career
2015	Belgium U16	7	(0)
2016	Belgium U17	8	(0)
2016–2017	Belgium U18	2	(0)
2017	Belgium U19	7	(0)
- * Club domestic league appearances and goals as of 31 October 2026

Xian Ghislaine Emmers (born 20 July 1999) is a Belgian professional footballer who plays as a midfielder for Liga I club Argeș Pitești.

== Club career ==
Emmers made his Serie B debut for Cremonese on 31 August 2018 in a game against Palermo.

On 11 July 2019, he joined Belgian side Waasland-Beveren on year-long deal.

On 8 August 2020, he went to Almere City on loan.

On 11 August 2021, Emmers joined Roda JC Kerkrade on a free transfer.

On 5 September 2022, Emmers signed a two-year contract with Rapid Bucureşti.

On 4 June 2025, Emmers joined USL Championship side Phoenix Rising.

== Personal life ==
Emmers is the son of the former Belgium international footballer Marc Emmers.

== Career statistics ==
As of match played 31 October 2026

Appearances and goals by club, season and competition
Club	Season	League			National cup (Note: Includes Belgian Cup, KNVB Beker, Cupa României, USL Cup)		Other		Total	
Club	Season	Division	Apps	Goals	Apps	Goals	Apps	Goals	Apps	Goals
Cremonese (loan)	2018–19	Serie B	20	1	—		—		20	0
Waasland-Beveren (loan)	2019–20	Belgian First Division A	8	0	1	1	—		9	1
Almere City (loan)	2020–21	Eerste Divisie	16	6	1	0	1 (Note: Appearances in Eredivisie promotion/relegation play-offs)	0	18	6
Roda JC	2021–22	Eerste Divisie	34	10	1	0	2	0	37	10
Roda JC	2022–23	Eerste Divisie	4	0	—		—		4	0
Roda JC	Total		38	10	1	0	2	0	41	10
Rapid București	2022–23	Liga I	24	1	3	2	—		27	3
Rapid București	2023–24	Liga I	15	1	1	0	—		16	1
Rapid București	2024–25	Liga I	13	0	3	1	—		16	1
Rapid București	Total		52	2	7	3	—		59	5
Phoenix Rising	2025	USL Championship	15	0	2	0	0	0	17	0
Argeș Pitești	2025–26	Liga I	7	0	0	0	—		7	0
Argeș Pitești	2026–27	Liga I	4	0	1	0	—		5	0
Argeș Pitești	Total		11	0	1	0	—		12	0
Career total			160	19	13	4	3	0	176	23
