= Albert Stahl =

Romanian footballer

Personal information
- Full name: Albert Tivadar Stahl
- Date of birth: 11 January 1999 (age 27)
- Place of birth: Arad, Romania
- Height: 1.80 m (5 ft 11 in)
- Position: Right winger

Team information
- Current team: FK Csíkszereda
- Number: 77

Youth career
- –2014: Atletico Arad
- 2014–2016: UTA Arad

Senior career*
| Years | Team | Apps | (Gls) |
| 2016–2019 | UTA Arad | 54 | (2) |
| 2019–2021 | Astra Giurgiu | 50 | (3) |
| 2021–2023 | Rapid București | 23 | (1) |
| 2022–2023 | → UTA Arad (loan) | 23 | (0) |
| 2023–2024 | UTA Arad | 21 | (0) |
| 2024–2026 | Bihor Oradea | 46 | (9) |
| 2026– | FK Csíkszereda | 14 | (0) |
- * Club domestic league appearances and goals as of 7 November 2026

Albert Tivadar Stahl (born 11 January 1999) is a Romanian professional footballer who plays as a right winger for Liga I club FK Csíkszereda.

== Club career ==
=== Early years ===
While a junior at Atletico Arad, Stahl traveled to English club Manchester City for several trials, but nothing came out of it, and he later joined UTA Arad. He was promoted from the UTA academy in the summer of 2016, aged 17, and made his senior debut on 20 August in a 3–0 victory to Dacia Unirea Braila for the Liga II championship. On 14 May 2017, he scored his first goal for the club in a 6–0 away win over Academica Clinceni.

In 2018, Stahl traveled to German club Borussia Dortmund for a trial, but nothing concrete was achieved.

=== Astra Giurgiu ===
On 19 July 2019, Astra Giurgiu transferred Stahl for an undisclosed fee, with the player penning a four-year deal.

=== Rapid București ===
On 30 August 2021, Stahl signed a three-year contract with Romanian club Rapid București.

=== UTA Arad ===
After spending one season on loan, Stahl signed a one-year contract with UTA Arad, with an option to extend for another season.

== Career statistics ==
As of match played 7 November 2026

Appearances and goals by club, season and competition
| Club | Season | League | | | Cupa României | | Europe | | Other | | Total | |
| Club | Season | Division | Apps | Goals | Apps | Goals | Apps | Goals | Apps | Goals | Apps | Goals |
|---|---|---|---|---|---|---|---|---|---|---|---|---|
| UTA Arad | 2016–17 | Liga II | 8 | 1 | 0 | 0 | — | | 2 (Note: Appearances in relegation/promotion play-offs) | 0 | 10 | 1 |
| UTA Arad | 2017–18 | Liga II | 30 | 1 | 1 | 2 | — | | — | | 31 | 3 |
| UTA Arad | 2018–19 | Liga II | 16 | 0 | 0 | 0 | — | | — | | 16 | 0 |
| UTA Arad | Total | | 54 | 2 | 1 | 2 | — | | 2 | 0 | 57 | 4 |
| Astra Giurgiu | 2019–20 | Liga I | 13 | 0 | 2 | 0 | — | | — | | 15 | 0 |
| Astra Giurgiu | 2020–21 | Liga I | 34 | 3 | 6 | 0 | — | | — | | 40 | 3 |
| Astra Giurgiu | 2021–22 | Liga II | 3 | 0 | — | | — | | — | | 3 | 0 |
| Astra Giurgiu | Total | | 50 | 3 | 8 | 0 | — | | — | | 58 | 3 |
| Rapid București | 2021–22 | Liga I | 23 | 1 | 2 | 0 | — | | — | | 25 | 1 |
| UTA Arad (loan) | 2022–23 | Liga I | 23 | 0 | 3 | 0 | — | | 2 | 0 | 28 | 1 |
| UTA Arad | 2023–24 | Liga I | 21 | 0 | 4 | 0 | — | | — | | 25 | 0 |
| UTA Arad | Total | | 44 | 0 | 7 | 0 | — | | 2 | 0 | 53 | 0 |
| Bihor Oradea | 2024–25 | Liga II | 22 | 2 | 1 | 0 | — | | — | | 23 | 2 |
| Bihor Oradea | 2025–26 | Liga II | 24 | 7 | 1 | 0 | — | | — | | 25 | 7 |
| Bihor Oradea | Total | | 46 | 9 | 2 | 0 | — | | — | | 48 | 9 |
| FK Csíkszereda | 2026–27 | Liga I | 14 | 0 | 2 | 1 | — | | — | | 16 | 1 |
| Career total | | | 231 | 15 | 22 | 3 | 0 | 0 | 4 | 0 | 257 | 18 |

== Honours ==
Astra Giurgiu

- Cupa României runner-up: 2020–21
