= Alexandru Crivac =

Romanian footballer (born 2002)

Personal information
- Full name: Alexandru Mihail Crivac
- Date of birth: 6 May 2002 (age 24)
- Place of birth: Pitești, Romania
- Height: 1.79 m (5 ft 10 in)
- Position: Defensive midfielder

Team information
- Current team: CSM Focșani (on loan from CSM Alexandria)
- Number: 4

Youth career
- 2008–2018: Școala de Fotbal Dănuț Coman
- 2018–2021: Gheorghe Hagi Academy
- 2021–2022: Argeș Pitești

Senior career*
Years	Team	Apps	(Gls)
2021–2022	Argeș Pitești	1	(0)
2022–2024	Rapid București	1	(0)
2023–2024	→ Progresul Spartac (loan)	19	(2)
2024–	CSM Alexandria		
2025–	→ CSM Focșani (loan)	5	(0)

International career
2018	Romania U16	5	(0)
2019	Romania U17	5	(0)
2019	Romania U18	2	(1)
- * Club domestic league appearances and goals as of 10 May 2025

Alexandru Mihail Crivac (born 6 May 2002) is a Romanian professional footballer who plays as a defensive midfielder for Liga II club CSM Focșani, on loan from Liga III club CSM Alexandria.

== Club career ==
=== Argeș Pitești ===
He made his Liga I debut for Argeș Pitești against Voluntari on 23 May 2022.

== Personal life ==
Crivac is the son of the former Romanian footballer Iulian Crivac.
