= Alexandru Despa =

Romanian professional footballer

Personal information
- Date of birth: 31 March 2002 (age 24)
- Place of birth: Bucharest, Romania
- Height: 1.81 m (5 ft 11 in)
- Position: Forward

Youth career
- –2022: Rapid București

Senior career*
Years	Team	Apps	(Gls)
2021–2023	Rapid București	3	(0)
2023	→ Progresul Spartac (loan)	0	(0)
2023	Tunari	2	(0)
2024–2025	ACS FC Dinamo		
- * Club domestic league appearances and goals as of 18:20, 8 December 2024 (UTC)

Alexandru Despa (born 31 March 2002) is a Romanian professional footballer who plays as a midfielder.

== Club career ==
=== Rapid București ===
He made his debut on 23 July 2021 for Rapid București in Liga I match against CS Mioveni.
