= Funsho Bamgboye =

Nigerian footballer (born 1999)

Personal information
- Full name: Funsho Ibrahim Bamgboye
- Date of birth: 9 January 1999 (age 27)
- Place of birth: Ibadan, Nigeria
- Height: 1.72 m (5 ft 8 in)
- Position: Winger

Team information
- Current team: Sepsi OSK
- Number: 70

Youth career
- 2012–2017: Aspire Academy Senegal

Senior career*
Years	Team	Apps	(Gls)
2017–2019	Haladás	36	(4)
2019–2023	Fehérvár	78	(12)
2023–2024	Rapid București	51	(8)
2024–2026	Hatayspor	41	(5)
2026–	Sepsi OSK	5	(0)

International career
2015	Nigeria U17	6	(2)
2016	Nigeria U20	1	(1)
Medal record
Men's football
Representing Nigeria
FIFA U-17 World Cup
Winner	2015 Chile
- * Club domestic league appearances and goals as of 15 August 2026

Funsho Ibrahim Bamgboye (born 9 January 1999) is a Nigerian professional footballer who plays as a winger for Liga I club Sepsi OSK.

== Club career ==
=== Early years ===
Born in Lagos, Bamgboye joined the Aspire Academy Senegal youth team in 2012, when he was discovered by the Aspire Football Dreams talent search program and given a scholarship. He qualified by being named one of the top three players in his age group amongst those selected from Nigeria. He led his team to a victory at the 2014 Al Kass International Cup in Qatar, where they defeated Real Madrid in the final in a penalty shootout.

He first attracted attention in April 2015, when he helped his club win that year's U16 Mediterranean International Cup in Spain, which included teams such as Villarreal and Sevilla. He supplied the game-winning assist in the final.

=== Hungary ===
In late 2016, it was reported that Bamgboye had undergone trials in Hungary with top flight club Szombathelyi Haladás. In January 2017, on his eighteenth birthday, Bamgboye officially signed a two-and-a-half-year contract with Haladás. Although there was initially an issue to get him his work permit, he finally made his debut on 25 February, during a 2–0 loss to Újpest. He came on as a 70' substitute for Márk Jagodics. In total, Bamgboye has played in 43 games for Haladás, 36 in Hungarian league and 7 in Magyar Kupa, with 4 goals and 5 decisive passes.

On 7 July 2019, Funsho signed a three-and-a-half-year deal with Fehérvár, after Haladás relegated from Nemzeti Bajnokság I to second division in 2018-19 season. During his period, he made 95 appearances for the club, scoring 13 goals and giving 19 assists. His contributions helped Fehérvár in domestic leagues and cup competitions. Notably, he played against Újpest in the final of the Hungarian Cup and was a key part of the team that finished Nemzeti Bajnokság I as runners-up in 2020. He also participated in European competitions along with his team, featuring in 10 matches, two in Europa League and eight in Conference League. Overall, his tenure at Fehérvár showcased his skills as a forward and winger, contributing both domestically and on the European stage.

=== Rapid București ===
After six years of playing in Hungary, on 31 January 2023, the Nigerian striker signed on a contract with the Romanian club Rapid Bucureşti until the summer of 2024, with the option of extending it for another season. He made his professional debut on 4 February, in a 4–1 victory home against FC Voluntari. Two months later, he scored his first goal in a 1–1 draw against Farul Constanţa.

=== Hatayspor ===
In July 2024, Bamgboye signed a two-year contract for Süper Lig club Hatayspor.

== International career ==
In October 2015, Bamgboye was named in Nigeria's squad to represent the national under-17 team at the 2015 FIFA U-17 World Cup in Chile. He made five appearances in the tournament, recording three assists. In the final against Mali, he scored the second goal in the 2–0 victory to help the Golden Eaglets secure the world title.

He also represented the national under-20 team at the 2017 Africa U-20 Cup of Nations qualification tournament. Although one of the team's key members, he was left off the squad by head coach Emmanuel Amunike for the first leg of their third round match-up against Sudan. He made his return to the team in the second leg as a part of the starting lineup. He scored a 26th-minute header off a cross from teammate Samuel Chukwueze; however, Nigeria lost 4–3 and were eliminated on away goals.

== Career statistics ==
=== Club ===
As of 19 August 2026

Appearances and goals by club, season and competition
Club	Season	League			National cup (Note: Includes Magyar Kupa, Cupa României, Turkish Cup)		Europe		Other		Total	
Club	Season	Division	Apps	Goals	Apps	Goals	Apps	Goals	Apps	Goals	Apps	Goals
Haladás	2016–17	Nemzeti Bajnokság I	3	0	—		—		—		3	0
Haladás	2017–18	Nemzeti Bajnokság I	2	0	2	0	—		—		4	0
Haladás	2018–19	Nemzeti Bajnokság I	31	4	5	0	—		—		36	4
Haladás	Total		36	4	7	0	—		—		43	4
Fehérvár	2019–20	Nemzeti Bajnokság I	16	2	7	1	0	0	—		23	3
Fehérvár	2020–21	Nemzeti Bajnokság I	31	7	7	0	2 (Note: Appearances in UEFA Europa League)	0	—		40	7
Fehérvár	2021–22	Nemzeti Bajnokság I	20	1	2	0	2 (Note: Appearances in UEFA Conference League)	0	—		24	1
Fehérvár	2022–23	Nemzeti Bajnokság I	11	2	1	0	6	0	—		18	2
Fehérvár	Total		78	12	17	1	10	0	—		105	13
Rapid București	2022–23	Liga I	12	3	—		—		—		12	3
Rapid București	2023–24	Liga I	39	5	3	0	—		—		42	5
Rapid București	Total		51	8	3	0	—		—		54	8
Hatayspor	2024–25	Süper Lig	31	2	3	1	—		—		34	3
Hatayspor	2025–26	TFF 1. Lig	10	3	1	2	—		—		11	5
Hatayspor	Total		41	5	4	3	—		—		45	8
Sepsi OSK	2026–27	Liga I	5	0	1	0	—		—		6	0
Career Total			211	29	32	4	10	0	0	0	253	33

== Honours ==
Fehérvár

- Magyar Kupa runner-up: 2020–21

Nigeria U17

- FIFA U-17 World Cup: 2015
