= FC Noah in European football =

Overview of FC Noah's role in European football

Noah in European football
- Club: Noah
- Most appearances: Hélder Ferreira (25); Matheus Aiás (25)
- Top scorer: Matheus Aiás (8)
- First entry: 2020–21 UEFA Europa League
- Latest entry: 2025–26 UEFA Conference League

FC Noah is an Armenian football club based in Armavir, Armenia.

== History ==
Noah made their European debut on 27 August 2020, in a UEFA Europa League First qualifying round match against Kairat from Kazakhstan, losing the match 0–1 in the one-legged tie. The following summer Noah entered the inaugural season of the UEFA Europa Conference League, where they faced KuPS in the First qualifying round, losing 5–1 on aggregate after winning the first leg Yerevan 1–0.

=== Matches ===
As of match played 13 August 2026

Season	Competition	Round	Club	Home	Away	Aggregate
2020–21	UEFA Europa League	1QR	(Kazakhstan) Kairat	—N/a	1–4	—N/a
2021–22	UEFA Europa Conference League	1QR	(Finland) KuPS	1–0	0–5	1–5
2024–25	UEFA Conference League	1QR	(North Macedonia) Shkëndija	2–0	2–1	4–1
2024–25	UEFA Conference League	2QR	(Malta) Sliema Wanderers	7–0	0–0	7–0
2024–25	UEFA Conference League	3QR	(Greece) AEK Athens	3–1	0–1	3–2
2024–25	UEFA Conference League	PO	(Slovakia) Ružomberok	3–0	1–3	4–3
2024–25	UEFA Conference League	League phase	(Czech Republic) Mladá Boleslav	2–0	—N/a	31st
2024–25	UEFA Conference League	League phase	(Austria) Rapid Wien	—N/a	0–1	31st
2024–25	UEFA Conference League	League phase	(England) Chelsea	—N/a	0–8	31st
2024–25	UEFA Conference League	League phase	(Iceland) Víkingur Reykjavík	0–0	—N/a	31st
2024–25	UEFA Conference League	League phase	(Cyprus) APOEL	1–3	—N/a	31st
2024–25	UEFA Conference League	League phase	(Serbia) TSC	—N/a	3–4	31st
2025–26	UEFA Champions League	1QR	(Montenegro) Budućnost Podgorica	1–0	2–2	3–2
2025–26	UEFA Champions League	2QR	(Hungary) Ferencváros	1–2	3–4	4–6
2025–26	UEFA Europa League	3QR	(Gibraltar) Lincoln Red Imps	0–0 (a.e.t.)	1–1	1–1 (5–6 p)
2025–26	UEFA Conference League	PO	(Slovenia) Olimpija Ljubljana	3–2	4–1	7–3
2025–26	UEFA Conference League	League phase	(Croatia) Rijeka	1–0	—N/a	19th
2025–26	UEFA Conference League	League phase	(Romania) Universitatea Craiova	—N/a	1–1	19th
2025–26	UEFA Conference League	League phase	(Czech Republic) Sigma Olomouc	1–2	—N/a	19th
2025–26	UEFA Conference League	League phase	(Scotland) Aberdeen	—N/a	1–1	19th
2025–26	UEFA Conference League	League phase	(Poland) Legia Warsaw	2–1	—N/a	19th
2025–26	UEFA Conference League	League phase	(Ukraine) Dynamo Kyiv	—N/a	0–2	19th
2025–26	UEFA Conference League	KPO	(Netherlands) AZ	1–0	0–4	1–4
2026–27	UEFA Conference League	1QR	(Moldova) Zimbru Chișinău	2-1	1–1	3-2
2026–27	UEFA Conference League	2QR	(Switzerland) Sion	2–2	1–2	2-3

== Player statistics ==
=== Appearances & Goals ===
As of match played 13 August 2026

	Name	Years	Champions League apps	Champions League goals	Europa League apps	Europa League goals	Conference League apps	Conference League goals	Total apps	Total goals	Ratio
1	(Portugal) Hélder Ferreira	2024–Present	4	1	2	0	28	5	34	6	0.18
2	(Burkina Faso) Gustavo Sangaré	2024–Present	4	0	2	0	25	1	32	1	0.03
3	(Brazil) Matheus Aiás	2024–2026	4	1	2	0	24	8	30	9	0.3
3	(Armenia) Sergey Muradyan (Note: Muradyan was born in Russia, but went on to represent Armenia at international level.)	2024–Present	4	0	2	0	23	0	30	0	0
5	(Armenia) Gor Manvelyan	2023–Present	3	0	2	0	21	3	27	3	0.11
6	(Portugal) Gonçalo Silva	2024–2026	4	0	2	0	18	0	24	0	0
7	(Netherlands) Imran Oulad Omar	2024–2026	4	2	2	0	16	3	22	5	0.23
8	(Armenia) Hovhannes Hambardzumyan	2023–Present	2	0	1	0	18	1	21	1	0.05
9	(Iceland) Guðmundur Þórarinsson	2024–2026	2	0	2	0	16	0	20	0	0
9	(Cameroon) Yan Eteki	2024–Present	4	0	2	1	14	0	20	1	0.05
11	(France) Virgile Pinson	2024–2026	2	0	2	0	15	4	19	4	0.21
11	(Armenia) Ognjen Čančarević (Note: Čančarević was born in SR Serbia, but went on to represent Armenia at international level.)	2024–2026	4	0	2	0	13	1	19	1	0.05
11	(Portugal) David Sualehe	2025–Present	4	0	1	0	14	0	19	0	0
11	(Ghana) Eric Boakye	2025–Present	3	0	2	0	14	0	19	0	0
15	(Croatia) Marin Jakoliš	2025–Present	4	0	2	0	12	1	18	1	0.06
16	(Portugal) Gonçalo Gregório	2024–2026	3	0	0	0	14	6	17	6	0.35
17	(Japan) Takuto Oshima	2025–Present	2	0	0	0	13	0	15	0	0
18	(Serbia) Aleksandar Miljković	2023–2025	0	0	0	0	12	1	12	1	0.08
18	(Albania) Eraldo Çinari	2024–2025	0	0	0	0	12	1	12	1	0.08
18	(Bosnia and Herzegovina) Nardin Mulahusejnović	2025–2026	0	0	2	0	10	5	12	5	0.42
18	(Guadeloupe) Nathanaël Saintini	2025–Present	0	0	0	0	12	0	12	0	0
22	(Croatia) Alen Grgić	2025–2026	4	2	2	0	4	0	10	2	0.2
23	(Armenia) Artak Dashyan	2024–2025	1	0	1	0	7	0	9	0	0
23	(Armenia) Artyom Avanesyan (Note: Avanesyan was born in Russia, but went on to represent Armenia at international level.)	2024–2026	0	0	0	0	9	0	9	0	0
25	(Brazil) Pablo Santos	2024	0	0	0	0	8	1	8	1	0.13
26	(Slovakia) Martin Gamboš	2023–2025	0	0	0	0	7	0	7	0	0
26	(Argentina) Bryan Mendoza	2024–2025	0	0	0	0	7	0	7	0	0
28	(Russia) Aleksey Ploshchadny	2024–2026	0	0	0	0	6	0	6	0	0
29	(Armenia) Grenik Petrosyan	2024–2025	0	0	0	0	5	0	5	0	0
29	(Democratic Republic of the Congo) Timothy Fayulu	2025–2026	0	0	0	0	5	0	5	0	0
29	(Bosnia and Herzegovina) Nermin Zolotić	2025–2026	2	0	0	0	3	0	5	0	0
32	(Portugal) Dani Figueira	2026–Present	0	0	0	0	4	0	4	0	0
32	(Serbia) Marko Lazetić	2026–Present	0	0	0	0	4	0	4	0	0
32	(Romania) Valentin Costache	2026–Present	0	0	0	0	4	1	4	1	0.25
35	(Guinea-Bissau) Saná Gomes	2020–2022	0	0	1	0	2	0	3	0	0
35	(Russia) Mikhail Kovalenko	2019-2021	0	0	1	0	2	0	3	0	0
35	(Armenia) Benik Hovhannisyan	2019–2022	0	0	1	0	2	0	3	0	0
35	(Latvia) Eduards Emsis	2020–2021	0	0	1	0	2	0	3	0	0
35	(Ukraine) Denys Dedechko	2020–2021	0	0	1	0	2	0	3	0	0
35	(Armenia) Hovhannes Harutyunyan	2025–2026	0	0	0	0	3	1	3	1	0.33
35	(Democratic Republic of the Congo) Stone Mambo	2026–Present	0	0	0	0	3	0	3	0	0
35	(Ghana) Brian Oddei	2026–Present	0	0	0	0	3	0	3	0	0
43	(Russia) Pavel Ovchinnikov	2021	0	0	0	0	2	0	2	0	0
43	(Brazil) Jefferson Oliveira	2021	0	0	0	0	2	0	2	0	0
43	(Armenia) Jordy Monroy (Note: Monroy was born in Colombia, but went on to represent Armenia at international level.)	2020–2022	0	0	0	0	2	0	2	0	0
43	(Russia) Andrei Titov	2021–2022	0	0	0	0	2	0	2	0	0
43	(Ghana) Raymond Gyasi (Note: Gyasi was born in Netherlands, but went on to represent Ghana at U23 level.)	2021–2022	0	0	0	0	2	0	2	0	0
43	(Russia) Pavel Kireyenko	2021–2022	0	0	0	0	2	0	2	0	0
43	(Armenia) Aleksandr Karapetyan (Note: Karapetyan was born in Georgian SSR, but went on to represent Armenia at international level.)	2021	0	0	0	0	2	0	2	0	0
43	(Armenia) Sargis Shahinyan	2021–2022	0	0	0	0	2	0	2	0	0
43	(Portugal) Alex Oliveira	2020–2022	0	0	0	0	2	0	2	0	0
43	(Armenia) Petros Avetisyan	2021–2022	0	0	0	0	2	0	2	0	0
43	(Armenia) Aram Khamoyan	2025–Present	0	0	0	0	3	0	3	0	0
43	(Spain) Mario González	2026–Present	0	0	0	0	2	0	2	0	0
43	(Slovenia) Michael Pavlović	2026–Present	0	0	0	0	2	0	2	0	0
56	(Italy) Valerio Vimercati	2019-2021, 2023–2024	0	0	1	0	0	0	1	0	0
56	(Russia) Vladislav Kryuchkov	2019-2021	0	0	1	0	0	0	1	0	0
56	(Russia) Soslan Kagermazov	2019–2020	0	0	1	0	0	0	1	0	0
56	(Russia) Vladimir Azarov	2019–2021	0	0	1	0	0	0	1	0	0
56	(Russia) Kirill Bor	2019–2021	0	0	1	1	0	0	1	1	1
56	(Armenia) Pavel Deobald	2019–2021	0	0	1	0	0	0	1	0	0
56	(Moldova) Dan Spătaru	2020, 2022	0	0	1	0	0	0	1	0	0
56	(Russia) Dmitri Lavrishchev	2019–2020, 2022	0	0	1	0	0	0	1	0	0
56	(Armenia) Artyom Simonyan (Note: Simonyan was born in Russia, but went on to represent Armenia at international level.)	2020	0	0	1	0	0	0	1	0	0
56	(Russia) Igor Smirnov	2021	0	0	0	0	1	0	1	0	0
56	(Brazil) Marcos Pedro	2024–2025	0	0	0	0	1	0	1	0	0
56	(Mali) Kalifala Doumbia	2026–Present	0	0	0	0	1	0	1	0	0

=== Clean sheets ===
As of match played 13 August 2026

	Name	Years	Champions League apps	Champions League cs	Europa League apps	Europa League cs	Conference League apps	Conference League cs	Total apps	Total cs	Ratio
1	(Armenia) Ognjen Čančarević	2024–2026	4	1	2	1	13	4	19	6	0.32
2	(Russia) Aleksey Ploshchadny	2024–2026	0	0	0	0	6	2	6	2	0.33
3	(Russia) Pavel Ovchinnikov	2021	0	0	0	0	2	1	2	1	0.5
3	(Democratic Republic of the Congo) Timothy Fayulu	2025–2026	0	0	0	0	5	1	5	1	0.2
5	(Italy) Valerio Vimercati	2019-2021, 2023–2024	0	0	1	0	0	0	1	0	0
5	(Portugal) Dani Figueira	2026–Present	0	0	0	0	4	0	4	0	0

== Overall record ==
=== By competition ===
As of match played 13 August 2026

Competition	GP	W	D	L	GF	GA	+/-
UEFA Champions League	4	1	1	2	7	8	-1
UEFA Europa League	3	0	2	1	2	5	-3
UEFA Conference League	30	13	6	11	45	47	-2
Total	37	14	9	14	54	60	-6

=== By country ===
As of match played 13 August 2026

Country	Pld	W	D	L	GF	GA	GD	Win%
Austria	1	0	0	1	0	1	−1	0.00
Croatia	1	1	0	0	1	0	+1	100.00
Cyprus	1	0	0	1	1	3	−2	0.00
Czech Republic	2	1	0	1	3	2	+1	50.00
England	1	0	0	1	0	8	−8	0.00
Finland	2	1	0	1	1	5	−4	50.00
Gibraltar	2	0	2	0	1	1	+0	0.00
Greece	2	1	0	1	3	2	+1	50.00
Hungary	2	0	0	2	4	6	−2	0.00
Iceland	1	0	1	0	0	0	+0	0.00
Kazakhstan	1	0	0	1	1	4	−3	0.00
Malta	2	1	1	0	7	0	+7	50.00
Moldova	2	1	1	0	3	2	+1	50.00
Montenegro	2	1	1	0	3	2	+1	50.00
Netherlands	2	1	0	1	1	4	−3	50.00
North Macedonia	2	2	0	0	4	1	+3	100.00
Poland	1	1	0	0	2	1	+1	100.00
Romania	1	0	1	0	1	1	+0	0.00
Scotland	1	0	1	0	1	1	+0	0.00
Serbia	1	0	0	1	3	4	−1	0.00
Slovakia	2	1	0	1	4	3	+1	50.00
Slovenia	2	2	0	0	7	3	+4	100.00
Switzerland	2	0	1	1	3	4	−1	0.00
Ukraine	1	0	0	1	0	2	−2	0.00

=== By club ===
As of match played 13 August 2026

Opponent	Played	Won	Drawn	Lost	For	Against	Difference	Ratio
(Scotland) Aberdeen	1	0	1	0	1	1	+0	0.00
(Greece) AEK Athens	2	1	0	1	3	2	+1	50.00
(Cyprus) APOEL	1	0	0	1	1	3	−2	0.00
(Netherlands) AZ	2	1	0	1	1	4	−3	50.00
(Montenegro) Budućnost Podgorica	2	1	1	0	3	2	+1	50.00
(England) Chelsea	1	0	0	1	0	8	−8	0.00
(Ukraine) Dynamo Kyiv	1	0	0	1	0	2	−2	0.00
(Hungary) Ferencváros	2	0	0	2	4	6	−2	0.00
(Finland) KuPS	2	1	0	1	1	5	−4	50.00
(Kazakhstan) Kairat	1	0	0	1	1	4	−3	0.00
(Poland) Legia Warsaw	1	1	0	0	2	1	+1	100.00
(Gibraltar) Lincoln Red Imps	2	0	2	0	1	1	+0	0.00
(Czech Republic) Mladá Boleslav	1	1	0	0	2	0	+2	100.00
(Slovenia) Olimpija Ljubljana	2	2	0	0	7	3	+4	100.00
(Austria) Rapid Wien	1	0	0	1	0	1	−1	0.00
(Croatia) Rijeka	1	1	0	0	1	0	+1	100.00
(Slovakia) Ružomberok	2	1	0	1	4	3	+1	50.00
(Malta) Sliema Wanderers	2	1	1	0	7	0	+7	50.00
(Czech Republic) Sigma Olomouc	1	0	0	1	1	2	−1	0.00
(Switzerland) Sion	2	0	1	1	3	4	−1	0.00
(North Macedonia) Shkëndija	2	2	0	0	4	1	+3	100.00
(Serbia) TSC	1	0	0	1	3	4	−1	0.00
(Romania) Universitatea Craiova	1	0	1	0	1	1	+0	0.00
(Iceland) Víkingur Reykjavik	1	0	1	0	0	0	+0	0.00
(Moldova) Zimbru Chișinău	2	1	1	0	3	2	+1	50.00
