= 2026–27 FC Noah season =

Noah
2026–27 season
- CEO: Artur Sahakyan
- Manager: Sandro Perković (until 19 August); Pablo García (from 20 August)
- Stadium: Armavir City Stadium
- Premier League: 1st
- Armenian Cup: Round of 16
- Armenian Supercup: Final
- UEFA Conference League: Third qualifying round vs Sion
- Top goalscorer: League: Hélder Ferreira (7); All: Hélder Ferreira (9)
Home colours	Away colours	Third colours

The 2026–27 season is FC Noah's 9th season in Armenian Premier League.

== Season events ==
On 18 June, Noah announced the signing of Davit Davtyan from BKMA Yerevan.

On 25 June, Noah announced the signing of Dani Figueira from Gil Vicente.

On 27 June, Noah announced the signing of Mario González from Burgos.

On 29 June, Noah announced the signing of Kalifala Doumbia from Ararat Yerevan.

On 30 June, Noah announced the signing of Michael Pavlović from Botoșani.

On 1 July, Noah announced the signing of Clinton Dombila from Ararat Yerevan.

On 2 July, Noah announced the signing of Mark Avetisyan from BKMA Yerevan.

On 11 July, Noah announced the signing of Stone Mambo from Grenoble.

On 13 July, Noah announced the signing of Marko Lazetić from Aberdeen.

On 18 July, Noah announced the signing of Brian Oddei from Koper.

On 3 August, Noah announced that they had extended their contract with Hélder Ferreira until the summer of 2028, with the option of an additional year.

On 19 August, Noah announced that Sandro Perković had left his role as Head Coach. The following day, 20 August, Pablo García was announced as the new Head Coach of Noah.

On 28 August, Noah announced that Davit Davtyan had joined Gandzasar on loan for the season.

On 16 September, Noah announced the signing of free-agent Saša Zdjelar.

== Squad ==
As of match played 7 November 2026

Number	Name	Nationality	Position	Date of birth (age)	Signed from	Signed in	Contract ends	Apps.	Goals
Goalkeepers
29	Arthur Coneglian	(Brazil)	GK	30 May 2004 (age 22)	Grêmio	2024		23	0
99	Dani Figueira	(Portugal)	GK	20 July 1998 (age 28)	Gil Vicente	2026		13	0
Defenders
3	Sergey Muradyan	(Armenia)	DF	27 August 2004 (age 22)	Zenit St.Petersburg	2023		127	4
5	Mark Avetisyan	(Armenia)	DF	24 June 2005 (age 21)	BKMA Yerevan	2026		5	0
6	Eric Boakye	(Ghana)	DF	19 November 1999 (age 26)	Aris Limassol	2025	2028	59	0
12	Clinton Dombila	(Ghana)	DF	10 February 2005 (age 21)	Ararat Yerevan	2026		8	0
19	Hovhannes Hambardzumyan	(Armenia)	DF	4 October 1990 (age 36)	Anorthosis Famagusta	2023		104	9
21	Michael Pavlović	(Slovenia)	DF	12 June 2001 (age 25)	Botoșani	2026		8	0
33	David Sualehe	(Portugal)	DF	23 March 1997 (age 29)	Olimpija Ljubljana	2025		54	3
39	Nathanaël Saintini	(Guadeloupe)	DF	30 May 2000 (age 26)	Sion	2025		45	3
Midfielders
4	Stone Mambo	(Democratic Republic of the Congo)	MF	25 March 1999 (age 27)	Grenoble	2026		16	0
10	Gor Manvelyan	(Armenia)	MF	9 April 2002 (age 24)	Nantes	2023		116	17
14	Takuto Oshima	(Japan)	MF	1 June 1998 (age 28)	Universitatea Craiova	2025	2028	51	2
16	Saša Zdjelar	(Serbia)	MF	20 March 1995 (age 31)	Unattached	2026		7	0
17	Gustavo Sangaré	(Burkina Faso)	MF	8 November 1996 (age 30)	Quevilly-Rouen	2024	2027(+1)	84	5
20	Valentin Costache	(Romania)	MF	2 August 1998 (age 28)	UTA Arad	2026		25	4
23	Aram Khamoyan	(Armenia)	MF	10 January 2000 (age 26)	BKMA Yerevan	2025		33	2
88	Yan Eteki	(Cameroon)	MF	26 August 1997 (age 29)	Alcorcón	2024		65	1
Forwards
7	Hélder Ferreira	(Portugal)	FW	5 April 1997 (age 29)	Anorthosis Famagusta	2024	2028 (+1)	103	39
8	Marko Lazetić	(Serbia)	FW	22 January 2004 (age 22)	Aberdeen	2026		18	10
9	Mario González	(Spain)	FW	25 February 1996 (age 30)	Burgos	2026		12	1
24	Zaven Khudaverdyan	(Armenia)	FW	15 June 2007 (age 19)	Pyunik	2024		35	4
44	Marin Jakoliš	(Croatia)	FW	26 December 1996 (age 29)	Unattached	2025		59	12
52	Marios Sofianos	(Greece)	FW	24 November 2003 (age 22)	Unattached	2026		1	0
57	Albert Gareginyan	(Armenia)	FW	3 November 2008 (age 18)	Shirak	2025		5	1
98	Brian Oddei	(Ghana)	FW	18 September 2002 (age 24)	Koper	2026		11	0
Noah II
40	Hovhannes Gevorgyan	(Armenia)	DF	5 October 2006 (age 20)	Mika	2024		0	0
43	David Dokhoyan	(Armenia)	DF	2 December 2008 (age 17)	Pyunik	2024		0	0
48	Kim Tovmasyan	(Armenia)	GK	25 May 2007 (age 19)	Academy	2025		0	0
50	Gagik Meloyan	(Armenia)	MF	23 March 2007 (age 19)	Academy	2024		2	0
60	Varazdat Gasparyan	(Armenia)	GK	7 March 2007 (age 19)	Pyunik	2024		0	0
61	Gor Grigoryan	(Armenia)	DF	25 July 2007 (age 19)	Academy	2024		1	0
62	Artur Talasyan	(Armenia)	DF	1 April 2005 (age 21)	Urartu	2024		0	0
63	Aram Beganyan	(Armenia)	MF	5 April 2005 (age 21)	Urartu	2024		0	0
64	Michael Asiryan	(Armenia)	FW	26 February 2008 (age 18)	Pyunik	2024		1	0
67	Andranik Karapetyan	(Armenia)	FW	6 November 2006 (age 20)	Mika	2024		1	0
68	Gevorg Grigoryan	(Armenia)	MF	5 April 2004 (age 22)	Urartu	2024		1	0
69	Roman Khachatryan	(Armenia)	GK	16 November 2008 (age 17)	Pyunik	2024		0	0
71	Bilal Fofana	(France)	FW	7 July 2006 (age 20)	Farense	2024		10	0
Players away on loan
18	Kalifala Doumbia	(Mali)	FW	28 September 2004 (age 22)	Ararat Yerevan	2026		4	1
55	Artur Movsesyan	(Armenia)	MF	2 January 2008 (age 18)	Academy	2024		7	0
77	Davit Davtyan	(Armenia)	GK	27 July 2005 (age 21)	BKMA Yerevan	2026		0	0
	Artyom Davidov	(Armenia)	GK	2 September 2007 (age 19)	Academy	2024		0	0
Players who left during the season

== Transfers ==
=== In ===
Date	Position	Nationality	Name	From	Fee	Ref.
18 June 2026	GK	(Armenia)	Davit Davtyan	BKMA Yerevan	Undisclosed	
25 June 2026	GK	(Portugal)	Dani Figueira	Gil Vicente	Undisclosed	
27 June 2026	FW	(Spain)	Mario González	Burgos	Undisclosed	
29 June 2026	FW	(Mali)	Kalifala Doumbia	Ararat Yerevan	Undisclosed	
30 June 2026	DF	(Slovenia)	Michael Pavlović	Botoșani	Undisclosed	
1 July 2026	DF	(Ghana)	Clinton Dombila	Ararat Yerevan	Undisclosed	
2 July 2026	DF	(Armenia)	Mark Avetisyan	BKMA Yerevan	Undisclosed	
11 July 2026	MF	(Democratic Republic of the Congo)	Stone Mambo	Grenoble	Undisclosed	
13 July 2026	FW	(Serbia)	Marko Lazetić	Aberdeen	Undisclosed	
18 July 2026	FW	(Ghana)	Brian Oddei	Koper	Undisclosed	
16 September 2026	MF	(Serbia)	Saša Zdjelar	Unattached	Free	

=== Loans out ===
Date from	Position	Nationality	Name	To	Date to	Ref.
28 August 2026	GK	(Armenia)	Davit Davtyan	Gandzasar	End of season	
30 August 2026	FW	(Mali)	Kalifala Doumbia	Gandzasar	End of season	

=== Released ===
Date	Position	Nationality	Name	Joined	Date	Ref.
11 July 2026	MF	(Netherlands)	Imran Oulad Omar	Dinamo Batumi	12 July 2026	

== Friendlies ==
23 June 2026	Koper	2–0	Noah	Slovenia
22:00 (UTC+4)	Goal	Report

28 June 2026	Noah	2–0	NK Aluminij	Slovenia
20:30 (UTC+4)	Hambardzumyan; Jakoliš	Report

4 July 2026	NŠ Mura	1–1	Noah	Maribor, Slovenia
20:00 (UTC+4)	Goal	Report	Hambardzumyan

7 July 2026	Noah	1–1	CFR Cluj	Maribor, Slovenia
19:00 (UTC+4)	Oddei	Report	Goal

15 July 2026	Noah	2–0	Van	Armavir
(UTC+4)	Ferreira; González	Report		Stadium: Hakob Tonoyan Stadium

16 July 2026	Noah	2–0	Syunik	Armavir
(UTC+4)	Hambardzumyan; Doumbia	Report		Stadium: Hakob Tonoyan Stadium

2 October 2026	Noah	2–2	Dinamo Batumi	Armavir
18:00 (UTC+4)	Sualehe; González	Report	Goal	Stadium: Noah Training Ground

== Competitions ==
=== Overview ===
Competition	First match	Last match	Starting round	Final position	Record							
Competition	First match	Last match	Starting round	Final position	Pld	W	D	L	GF	GA	GD	Win %
Premier League	2 August 2026		Matchday 1		13	11	1	1	32	10	+22	84.62
Armenian Cup	29 October 2026		Round of 16		1	1	0	0	4	3	+1	100.00
Armenian Supercup	2026		Final		0	0	0	0	0	0	+0	—
UEFA Conference League	23 July 2026	13 August 2026	Second qualifying round	Third qualifying round	4	1	2	1	6	6	+0	25.00
Total					18	13	3	2	42	19	+23	72.22

Last updated: 7 November 2026
Source: Competitions

=== Armenian Supercup ===
	–
(UTC+4)

=== Premier League ===
==== Results summary ====
Overall								Home						Away					
Pld	W	D	L	GF	GA	GD	Pts	W	D	L	GF	GA	GD	W	D	L	GF	GA	GD
13	11	1	1	32	10	+22	34	6	1	0	15	3	+12	5	0	1	17	7	+10

Last updated: 7 November 2026.
Source: See Results

==== Results by round ====
Round	1	2	3	4	5	6	7	8	9	10	11	12	13
Ground	H	A	H	A	H	H	A	H	A	H	A	A	H
Result	W	W	W	W	W	W	W	W	W	D	L	W	W
Position	3	2	1	1	1	1	1	1	1	1	1	1	1

Updated to match(es) played on 7 November 2026. Source: See Results
A = Away; H = Home; W = Win; D = Draw; L = Loss; P = Bye

==== Results ====
2 August 2026 1	Noah	3–0	Syunik	Abovyan
19:00 (UTC+4)	Doumbia 30'; Lazetić 41'; Gareginyan 82'	Report	Sargsyan (yellow card) 52'	Stadium: Vahagn Tumasyan Stadium; Referee: Vardan Vardumyan

9 August 2026 2	Shirak	3–4	Noah	Gyumri
19:00 (UTC+4)	Janoyan (yellow card) 11'; Ghumashyan 44'; Manukyan 61'; Mkrtchyan (yellow card) 66'; Pahlevanyan (yellow card) 69'; Muradyan 76' (o.g.)	Report	Khamoyan (yellow card) 26'; Ferreira 30', 90+7' (pen.); Jakoliš 50'; Manvelyan (yellow card) 53' (goal) 57'; Khudaverdyan (yellow card) 86'	Stadium: City Stadium; Referee: Henrik Nalbandian

17 August 2026 3	Noah	1–0	Alashkert	Abovyan
20:00 (UTC+4)	Muradyan (yellow card) 25'; Sualehe (yellow card) 53'; Lazetić 60'; Oshima (yellow card) 70'; Khamoyan (yellow card) 90+1'	Report	Cézar (yellow card) 35'; Massoumou (yellow card) 38'; Terteryan (yellow card) 81'	Stadium: Vahagn Tumasyan Stadium; Referee: Artem Gasparyan

23 August 2026 4	BKMA Yerevan	0–1	Noah	Yerevan
18:00 (UTC+4)	Arg.Petrosyan (yellow card) 20'	Report	Oshima (yellow card) 23'; Khudaverdyan 73'	Stadium: Academy Stadium; Referee: Hovhannes Kalantaryan

30 August 2026 5	Noah	4–0	Ararat Yerevan	Abovyan
20:00 (UTC+4)	Ferreira 20', 31'; Costache (yellow card) 45'; Manvelyan 45+2'; Khudaverdyan 68'	Report	Berte (yellow card) 23'; Samsonyan (yellow card) 45'; Khachumyan (yellow card) 45'; Chukwu (yellow card) 55'	Stadium: Vahagn Tumasyan Stadium; Referee: Ashot Ghaltakhchyan

4 September 2026 6	Noah	3–2	Gandzasar	Abovyan
20:00 (UTC+4)	Jakoliš 40', 43'; Manvelyan 90+8'	Report	Mambo 13' (o.g.); Reis 34'; Lizalda (yellow card) 63'; Kankanyan (yellow card) 90+5'; Avanesyan (yellow card) 90+5'; Mani (yellow card) 90+6'	Stadium: Vahagn Tumasyan Stadium; Referee: David Mkrtchyan

12 September 2026 7	Urartu	0–3	Noah	Yerevan
20:00 (UTC+4)		Report	Ferreira 31', 49'; Mambo (yellow card) 41'; Lazetić 43'; Manvelyan (yellow card) 62'	Stadium: Urartu Stadium; Referee: Henrik Nalbandian

18 September 2026 8	Noah	2–0	Van	Abovyan
20:00 (UTC+4)	Jakoliš (yellow card) 40'; Hambardzumyan (yellow card) 55'; Zdjelar (yellow card) 56'; Lazetić 66'; Ferreira 75'; Dombila (yellow card) 89'	Report	Sammani (yellow card) 69'; Obinna (yellow card) 77'	Stadium: Vahagn Tumasyan Stadium; Referee: Artak Vardanyan

11 October 2026 9	Sardarapat	1–5	Noah	Abovyan
16:00 (UTC+4)	Petrosyan 90+5' (pen.)	Report	González 13'; Hambardzumyan (yellow card) 41'; Sualehe 43'; Costache 45'; Jakoliš 76' (yellow card) 90'; Lazetić 83'; Mambo (yellow card) 90+4'; Ferreira (yellow card) 90+6'	Stadium: Vahagn Tumasyan Stadium; Referee: Vardan Vardumyan

18 October 2026 10	Noah	1–1	Pyunik	Abovyan
20:00 (UTC+4)	Dombila (yellow card) 29'; Lazetić 51'; Hambardzumyan (yellow card) 72'	Report	Kulikov (yellow card) 20' (goal) 31'	Stadium: Vahagn Tumasyan Stadium; Referee: Artem Gasparyan

26 October 2026 11	Ararat-Armenia	2–1	Noah	Abovyan
19:00 (UTC+4)	Lima 9'; Shaghoyan 22'; Wilson (yellow card) 57'; França (yellow card) 90+6'	Report	Khamoyan (yellow card) 40'; Boakye (yellow card) 47'; Sualehe (yellow card) 54'; Hambardzumyan (yellow card) 60'; Saintini (yellow card) 70' (red card) 90'; Lazetić 80'	Stadium: Vahagn Tumasyan Stadium; Referee: Henrik Nalbandian

1 November 2026 12	Syunik	1–3	Noah	Sisian
15:30 (UTC+4)	Kalu 5'; Litveacov (yellow card) 20'; Barseghyan (yellow card) 42'; Souassi (yellow card) 87'	Report	Ferreira 22' (pen.); Khamoyan (yellow card) 44'; Sualehe (yellow card) 45'; Lazetić 57', 82'	Stadium: City Stadium; Referee: Sargis Khachatryan

7 November 2026 13	Noah	1–0	Shirak	Abovyan
19:00 (UTC+4)	Zdjelar (yellow card) 24'; Lazetić 40'; Boakye (yellow card) 64'	Report	Fofana (yellow card) 79'; Mnatsakanyan (yellow card) 90+2'	Stadium: Vahagn Tumasyan Stadium; Referee: Zaven Hovhannisyan

22 November 2026 14	Alashkert	–	Noah	Yerevan
20:00 (UTC+4)		Report		Stadium: Academy Stadium

==== League table ====
Pos	Team	Pld	W	D	L	GF	GA	GD	Pts	Qualification or relegation
1	Noah	13	11	1	1	32	10	+22	34	Qualification for the Champions League first qualifying round
2	Pyunik	13	9	4	0	31	9	+22	31	Qualification for the Conference League second qualifying round
3	Ararat-Armenia	12	9	2	1	24	10	+14	29	Qualification for the Conference League first qualifying round
4	Alashkert	13	7	4	2	28	12	+16	25	
5	Sardarapat	13	5	5	3	20	20	0	20	
6	Urartu	12	4	4	4	19	15	+4	16	
7	Shirak	13	4	2	7	14	16	−2	14	
8	Van	13	3	2	8	12	32	−20	11	
9	Ararat Yerevan	13	3	2	8	10	21	−11	11	
10	BKMA	13	3	2	8	14	23	−9	11	
11	Syunik	12	2	2	8	11	26	−15	8	
12	Gandzasar Kapan	12	1	0	11	9	30	−21	3	Relegation to the Armenian First League

Updated to match(es) played on 7 November 2026. Source: FFA
Rules for classification: 1) Points; 2) Head-to-head points; 3) Head-to-head goal difference; 4) Head-to-head goals scored; 5) Matches won; 6) Goal difference; 7) Less red cards; 8) Less yellow cards ; 9) Fair-play ranking 10) Draw

=== Armenian Cup ===
29 October 2026 Round of 16	Noah	4–3 (a.e.t.)	Syunik	Abovyan
19:00 (UTC+4)	Figueira (yellow card) 45+3'; Sangaré (yellow card) 65'; Sualehe 79', 100' (yellow card) 88'; Coneglian (yellow card) 83'; Boakye (yellow card) 90+3'; Ferreira 90+11' (pen.), 120+8' (yellow card) 120+9'; Lazetić (yellow card) 94'; Hambardzumyan (yellow card) 120+5'	Report	Kalu 23'; Odinakachi 38'; Hayrapetyan (yellow card) 52'; Annor (yellow card) 90'; Poghikyan 107'; Sá (yellow card) 108'	Stadium: Vahagn Tumasyan Stadium; Referee: David Mkrtchyan

	–
(UTC+4)

=== UEFA Conference League ===
==== Qualifying rounds ====
23 July 2026 Second qualifying round 1st leg	Zimbru Chișinău (Moldova)	1–1	(Armenia) Noah	Chișinău, Moldova
21:00 (UTC+4)	Bîtca 43'; Ceijas (yellow card) 87'	Report	Mambo (yellow card) 45'; Costache 88'	Stadium: Zimbru Stadium; Attendance: 5,143; Referee: Karl Koppel (Estonia)

30 July 2026 Second qualifying round 2nd leg	Noah (Armenia)	2–1 (3–2 agg.)	(Moldova) Zimbru Chișinău	Abovyan, Armenia
20:00 (UTC+4)	Oshima (yellow card) 29'; Manvelyan 31'; Sangaré 47'	Report	Amoroso (yellow card) 51'; Ceijas (yellow card) 55'; Jonathas 76'; Gutium (yellow card) 80'	Stadium: Vahagn Tumasyan Stadium; Attendance: 3,100; Referee: Mateo Tozan (Slovenia)

6 August 2026 Third qualifying round 1st leg	Noah (Armenia)	2–2	(Switzerland) Sion	Abovyan, Armenia
20:00 (UTC+4)	Ferreira 5' (pen.); Manvelyan 20'; Mambo (red card) 64'	Report	Hefti (yellow card) 4' (yellow-red card) 26'; Boteli 13'; Chouaref 57'	Stadium: Vahagn Tumasyan Stadium; Attendance: 3,000; Referee: Matthew De Gabriele (Malta)

13 August 2026 Third qualifying round 2nd leg	Sion (Switzerland)	2–1 (4–3 agg.)	(Armenia) Noah	Sion, Switzerland
22:15 (UTC+4)	Batata (yellow card) 27' (goal) 53'; Boteli 54'	Report	Ferreira 25' (pen.) (yellow card) 47'; Costache (yellow card) 69'	Stadium: Stade Tourbillon; Attendance: 8,150; Referee: David Šmajc (Slovenia)

== Squad statistics ==
As of match played 7 November 2026

=== Appearances and goals ===
No.	Pos	Nat	Player	Total		Premier League		Armenian Cup		Supercup		Conference League	
No.	Pos	Nat	Player	Apps	Goals	Apps	Goals	Apps	Goals	Apps	Goals	Apps	Goals
3	DF	(Armenia) ARM	Sergey Muradyan	8	0	5+1	0	0	0	0	0	1+1	0
4	MF	(Democratic Republic of the Congo) COD	Stone Mambo	16	0	12	0	0+1	0	0	0	3	0
5	DF	(Armenia) ARM	Mark Avetisyan	5	0	2+2	0	1	0	0	0	0	0
6	DF	(Ghana) GHA	Eric Boakye	18	0	11+2	0	1	0	0	0	2+2	0
7	FW	(Portugal) POR	Hélder Ferreira	17	12	12	8	0+1	2	0	0	4	2
8	FW	(Serbia) SRB	Marko Lazetić	18	10	10+3	10	0+1	0	0	0	1+3	0
9	FW	(Spain) ESP	Mario González	12	1	2+7	1	1	0	0	0	2	0
10	MF	(Armenia) ARM	Gor Manvelyan	14	5	6+3	3	1	0	0	0	3+1	2
12	DF	(Ghana) GHA	Clinton Dombila	8	0	2+6	0	0	0	0	0	0	0
14	MF	(Japan) JPN	Takuto Oshima	13	0	7+2	0	0	0	0	0	4	0
16	MF	(Serbia) SRB	Saša Zdjelar	7	0	5+1	0	0+1	0	0	0	0	0
17	MF	(Burkina Faso) BFA	Gustavo Sangaré	11	1	3+3	0	1	0	0	0	4	1
19	DF	(Armenia) ARM	Hovhannes Hambardzumyan	11	0	7+1	0	0	0	0	0	2+1	0
20	MF	(Romania) ROU	Valentin Costache	16	2	7+5	1	0	0	0	0	0+4	1
21	DF	(Slovenia) SLO	Michael Pavlović	8	0	5	0	1	0	0	0	0+2	0
23	MF	(Armenia) ARM	Aram Khamoyan	17	0	10+3	0	1	0	0	0	1+2	0
24	FW	(Armenia) ARM	Zaven Khudaverdyan	9	2	1+7	2	1	0	0	0	0	0
29	GK	(Brazil) BRA	Arthur Coneglian	5	0	5	0	0	0	0	0	0	0
33	DF	(Portugal) POR	David Sualehe	12	3	5+2	1	0+1	2	0	0	4	0
39	DF	(Guadeloupe) GLP	Nathanaël Saintini	12	0	6+1	0	1	0	0	0	4	0
44	FW	(Croatia) CRO	Marin Jakoliš	16	4	6+5	4	1	0	0	0	4	0
52	FW	(Greece) GRE	Marios Sofianos	1	0	0+1	0	0	0	0	0	0	0
57	FW	(Armenia) ARM	Albert Gareginyan	4	1	1+2	1	0+1	0	0	0	0	0
98	FW	(Ghana) GHA	Brian Oddei	11	0	3+5	0	0	0	0	0	1+2	0
99	GK	(Portugal) POR	Dani Figueira	13	0	8	0	1	0	0	0	4	0
Players away on loan:
18	FW	(Ghana) GHA	Kalifala Doumbia	4	1	2+1	1	0	0	0	0	0+1	0
Players who left Noah during the season:

=== Goal scorers ===
Place	Position	Nation	Number	Name	Premier League	Armenian Cup	Supercup	Conference League	Total
1	FW	(Portugal)	7	Hélder Ferreira	8	2	0	2	12
2	FW	(Serbia)	8	Marko Lazetić	10	0	0	0	10
3	MF	(Armenia)	10	Gor Manvelyan	3	0	0	2	5
4	FW	(Croatia)	44	Marin Jakoliš	4	0	0	0	4
5	DF	(Portugal)	33	David Sualehe	1	2	0	0	3
6	FW	(Armenia)	24	Zaven Khudaverdyan	2	0	0	0	2
6	MF	(Romania)	20	Valentin Costache	1	0	0	1	2
8	FW	(Ghana)	18	Kalifala Doumbia	1	0	0	0	1
8	FW	(Armenia)	57	Albert Gareginyan	1	0	0	0	1
8	FW	(Spain)	9	Mario González	1	0	0	0	1
8	MF	(Burkina Faso)	17	Gustavo Sangaré	0	0	0	1	1
				TOTALS	32	4	0	6	42

=== Clean sheets ===
Place	Position	Nation	Number	Name	Premier League	Armenian Cup	Supercup	Conference League	Total
1	GK	(Portugal)	99	Dani Figueira	5	0	0	0	5
2	GK	(Brazil)	29	Arthur Coneglian	2	0	0	0	2
				TOTALS	6	0	0	0	6

=== Disciplinary record ===
Number	Nation	Position	Name	Premier League		Armenian Cup		Supercup		Conference League		Total	
Number	Nation	Position	Name	Yellow card	Red card	Yellow card	Red card	Yellow card	Red card	Yellow card	Red card	Yellow card	Red card
3	(Armenia)	DF	Sergey Muradyan	1	0	0	0	0	0	0	0	1	0
4	(Democratic Republic of the Congo)	MF	Stone Mambo	2	0	0	0	0	0	1	1	3	1
6	(Ghana)	DF	Eric Boakye	2	0	1	0	0	0	0	0	3	0
7	(Portugal)	FW	Hélder Ferreira	1	0	1	0	0	0	1	0	3	0
8	(Serbia)	FW	Marko Lazetić	0	0	1	0	0	0	0	0	1	0
10	(Armenia)	MF	Gor Manvelyan	2	0	0	0	0	0	0	0	2	0
12	(Ghana)	DF	Clinton Dombila	2	0	0	0	0	0	0	0	2	0
14	(Japan)	MF	Takuto Oshima	2	0	0	0	0	0	1	0	3	0
16	(Serbia)	MF	Saša Zdjelar	2	0	0	0	0	0	0	0	2	0
17	(Burkina Faso)	MF	Gustavo Sangaré	0	0	1	0	0	0	0	0	1	0
19	(Armenia)	DF	Hovhannes Hambardzumyan	4	0	1	0	0	0	0	0	5	0
20	(Romania)	MF	Valentin Costache	1	0	0	0	0	0	1	0	2	0
23	(Armenia)	MF	Aram Khamoyan	4	0	0	0	0	0	0	0	4	0
24	(Armenia)	FW	Zaven Khudaverdyan	1	0	0	0	0	0	0	0	1	0
29	(Brazil)	GK	Arthur Coneglian	0	0	1	0	0	0	0	0	1	0
33	(Portugal)	DF	David Sualehe	3	0	1	0	0	0	0	0	4	0
39	(Guadeloupe)	DF	Nathanaël Saintini	1	1	0	0	0	0	0	0	1	1
44	(Croatia)	FW	Marin Jakoliš	2	0	0	0	0	0	0	0	2	0
99	(Portugal)	GK	Dani Figueira	0	0	1	0	0	0	0	0	1	0
Players away on loan:
Players who left Noah during the season:
			TOTALS	30	1	8	0	0	0	4	1	42	2
