= 2021–22 CFR Cluj season =

CFR Cluj
2021–22 season
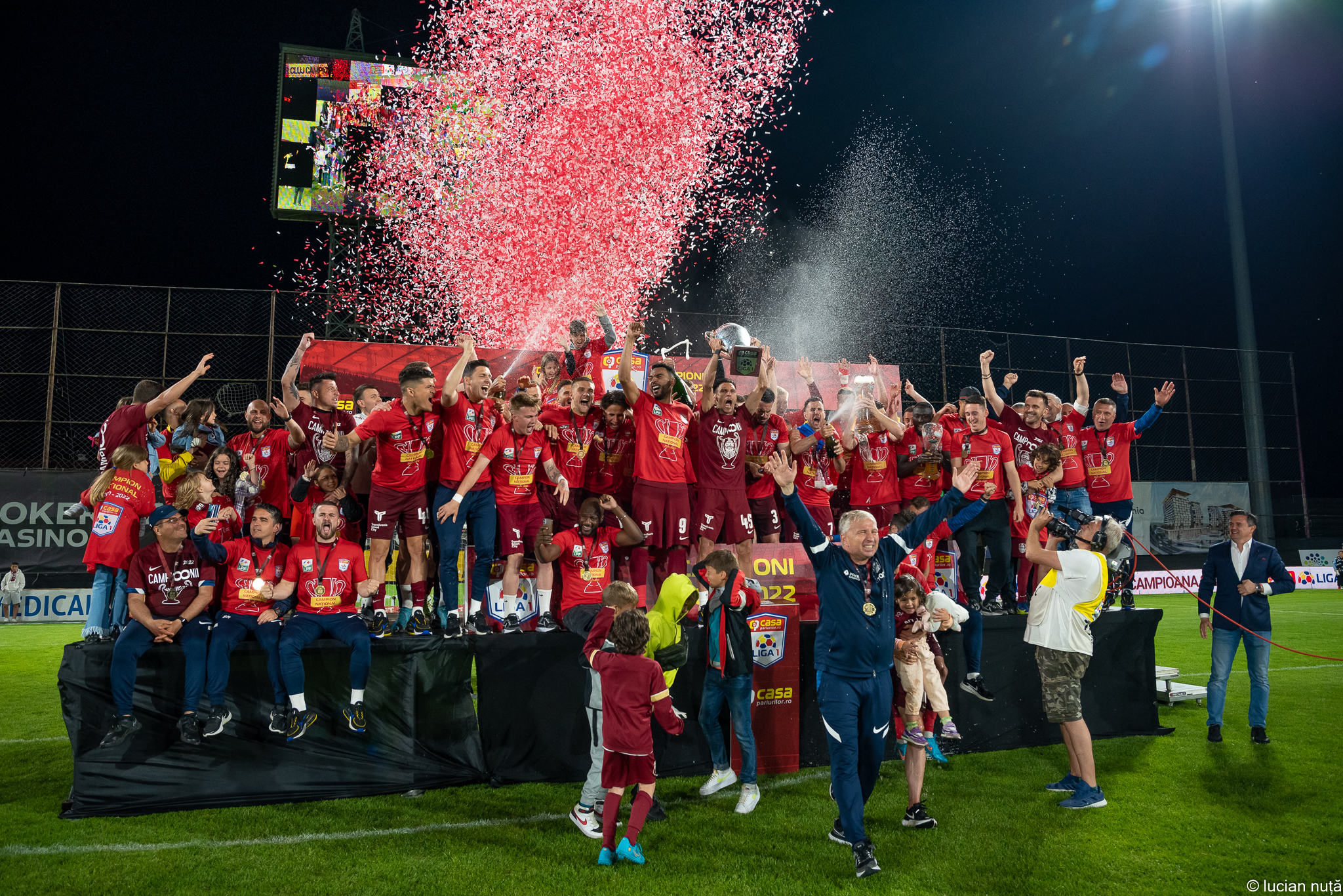
- CFR Cluj celebrating winning the 2021–22 Liga I
- Owner: Ioan Varga
- Manager: Marius Șumudică (until 28 August); Dan Petrescu (from 31 August)
- Stadium: Stadionul Dr. Constantin Rădulescu
- Liga I: 1st
- Cupa României: Round of 32
- Supercupa României: Runners-up
- UEFA Champions League: Third qualifying round
- UEFA Europa League: Play-off round
- UEFA Europa Conference League: Group stage
Home colours	Away colours

The 2021–22 season was Fotbal Club CFR 1907 Cluj's 26th consecutive season in the Liga I and 114th year in existence as a football club. In addition to the domestic league, CFR Cluj participated in this season's editions of the Cupa României, the Supercupa României, the UEFA Champions League, the UEFA Europa League and the UEFA Europa Conference League.

== Squad ==
Note: Flags indicate national team as defined under FIFA eligibility rules; some limited exceptions apply. Players may hold more than one non-FIFA nationality.

No.	Pos.	Nation	Player
3	DF	ROU	Andrei Burcă
4	DF	ROU	Cristian Manea
5	MF	ARG	Jonathan Rodríguez
6	DF	BIH	Daniel Graovac
7	MF	ROU	Adrian Păun
8	MF	ISL	Rúnar Már Sigurjónsson
9	FW	FRA	Billel Omrani
10	MF	ROU	Ciprian Deac
11	MF	ROU	Alexandru Chipciu
13	DF	ROU	Denis Ciobotariu
16	DF	BIH	Mateo Sušić
17	DF	ROU	Mihai Butean
18	FW	ROU	Valentin Costache
19	MF	ARG	Emmanuel Culio
21	MF	GHA	Nana Boateng
22	FW	CRO	Gabriel Debeljuh
23	GK	POR	Cristiano
23	MF	ROU	Raul Haiduc
24	MF	MAR	Anas Tahiri

No.	Pos.	Nation	Player
25	FW	MLI	Hadi Sacko
27	MF	ROU	Claudiu Petrila
28	MF	ROU	Ovidiu Hoban
29	DF	ALG	Rachid Bouhenna
30	GK	CRO	Karlo Letica
34	GK	ROU	Cristian Bălgrădean
37	MF	ROU	Mihai Bordeianu
45	DF	ROU	Camora
75	MF	ROU	Adrian Gîdea
76	MF	MTN	Guessouma Fofana
77	FW	ROU	Denis Alibec
82	MF	ROU	Alin Fică
86	MF	ROU	Denis Rusu
88	MF	ROU	Răzvan Andronic
89	GK	ROU	Otto Hindrich
92	DF	COD	Mike Cestor
96	DF	ROU	Florin Ștefan

== Competitions ==
=== Overview ===
Competition	First match	Last match	Starting round	Final position	Record							
Competition	First match	Last match	Starting round	Final position	Pld	W	D	L	GF	GA	GD	Win %
Liga I	16 July 2021	22 May 2022	Matchday 1	Winners	40	30	5	5	66	25	+41	75.00
Cupa României	23 September 2021	23 September 2021	Round of 32	Round of 32	1	0	0	1	0	1	−1	0.00
Supercupa României	10 July 2021		Final	Runners-up	1	0	1	0	0	0	+0	0.00
UEFA Champions League	6 July 2021	10 August 2021	First qualifying round	Third qualifying round	6	3	1	2	10	8	+2	50.00
UEFA Europa League	17 August 2021	26 August 2021	Play-off round	Play-off round	2	0	0	2	1	6	−5	0.00
UEFA Europa Conference League	16 September 2021	9 December 2021	Group stage	Group stage	6	1	1	4	4	7	−3	16.67
Total					56	34	8	14	81	47	+34	60.71

Source: Competitions

=== Supercupa României ===
CFR Cluj, as Liga I winners in the previous season, played against Universitatea Craiova in the 2021 Supercupa României, who themselves won the Cupa României.

10 July 2021 Final	CFR Cluj	0–0 (2–4 p)	Universitatea Craiova	Bucharest
20:00 EEST (UTC+3)	Petrila (yellow card) 88'	Report	Mateiu (yellow card) 69'; Cicâldău (yellow card) 90+2'	Stadium: Arena Națională; Referee: Adrian Cojocaru
	Penalties
	Rodríguez (penalty scored); Păun (penalty missed); Costache (penalty scored); Omrani (penalty missed)		(penalty scored) Gustavo; (penalty scored) Găman; (penalty scored) Cicâldău; (penalty scored) Marković
Note: Universitatea Craiova on penalty kicks 4–2.

=== Liga I ===
==== Results summary ====
Overall								Home						Away					
Pld	W	D	L	GF	GA	GD	Pts	W	D	L	GF	GA	GD	W	D	L	GF	GA	GD
40	30	5	5	66	25	+41	95	17	2	1	34	10	+24	13	3	4	32	15	+17

Source: Competitions

==== Regular season ====
===== Table =====
Pos	Team	Pld	W	D	L	GF	GA	GD	Pts	Qualification
1	CFR Cluj	30	24	4	2	48	16	+32	76	Qualification for the Play-off round
2	FCSB	30	18	8	4	54	28	+26	62	Qualification for the Play-off round
3	Universitatea Craiova	30	16	6	8	55	29	+26	54	Qualification for the Play-off round
4	Argeș Pitești	30	14	6	10	28	22	+6	48	Qualification for the Play-off round
5	Farul Constanța	30	14	6	10	42	21	+21	48	Qualification for the Play-off round

Source: LPF (in Romanian) Soccerway
Rules for classification: 1) Points; 2) Head-to-head points; 3) Head-to-head goal difference; 4) Head-to-head goals scored; 5) Goal difference; 6) Goals scored; 7) Play-off.

===== Matches =====
16 July 2021 1	CFR Cluj	3–2	FC U Craiova 1948	Cluj-Napoca
21:30 EEST (UTC+3)	Deac 10'; Tahiri 12'; Petrila 75'	Report	Bauza 22'; Baeten 33'	Stadium: Dr. Constantin Rădulescu; Referee: Radu Petrescu

24 July 2021 2	Academica Clinceni	1–2	CFR Cluj	Călărași
21:30 EEST (UTC+3)	Cascini 69' (pen.)	Report	Petrila 61'; Latovlevici 87'	Stadium: Stadionul Ion Comșa; Referee: Lucian Rusandu

31 July 2021 3	CFR Cluj	1–0	Chindia Târgoviște	Cluj-Napoca
22:00 EEST (UTC+3)	Alibec 52'	Report	Matiș (yellow card) 60'	Stadium: Dr. Constantin Rădulescu; Referee: Florin Andrei

6 August 2021 4	Mioveni	0–1	CFR Cluj	Mioveni
21:30 EEST (UTC+3)		Report	Petrila 49'	Stadium: Stadionul Orășenesc; Referee: Andrei Chivulete

13 August 2021 5	CFR Cluj	1–0	Farul Constanța	Cluj-Napoca
21:30 EEST (UTC+3)	Debeljuh 36'	Report	Pires (yellow card) 58'	Stadium: Dr. Constantin Rădulescu; Referee: Sebastian Colțescu

21 August 2021 6	Argeș Pitești	0–1	CFR Cluj	Pitești
21:30 EEST (UTC+3)		Report	Omrani 30'	Stadium: Stadionul Nicolae Dobrin; Referee: Adrian Costreie

29 August 2021 7	CFR Cluj	4–1	FCSB	Cluj-Napoca
21:00 EEST (UTC+3)	Omrani 30'; Sigurjónsson 56'; Deac 67'; Alibec 73' (pen.)	Report	Stoica 90'	Stadium: Dr. Constantin Rădulescu; Referee: Ovidiu Hațegan

11 September 2021 8	Botoșani	1–0	CFR Cluj	Botoșani
21:00 EEST (UTC+3)	Kage 71'; Țigănașu (yellow card) 90+4'; Silva (yellow card) 90+5'	Report		Stadium: Stadionul Municipal; Referee: Radu Petrescu

20 September 2021 9	CFR Cluj	1–0	Universitatea Craiova	Cluj-Napoca
21:00 EEST (UTC+3)	Burcă 20'	Report		Stadium: Dr. Constantin Rădulescu; Referee: Marcel Bîrsan

26 September 2021 10	UTA Arad	0–1	CFR Cluj	Arad
21:00 EEST (UTC+3)		Report	Chipciu 27'	Stadium: Stadionul Francisc von Neuman; Referee: Horia Mladinovici

3 October 2021 11	CFR Cluj	2–1	Gaz Metan Mediaș	Cluj-Napoca
18:00 EEST (UTC+3)	Petrila 46'; Deac 59'	Report	Matias 12'	Stadium: Dr. Constantin Rădulescu; Referee: Florin Andrei

17 October 2021 12	Rapid București	2–0	CFR Cluj	Mioveni
20:30 EEST (UTC+3)	Bălan 27', 55'; Júnior Morais (yellow card) 53'	Report	Costache (yellow card) 74'	Stadium: Stadionul Orășenesc; Referee: Ovidiu Hațegan

25 October 2021 13	CFR Cluj	2–0	Sepsi OSK	Cluj-Napoca
20:30 EEST (UTC+3)	Bouhenna 24'; Culio 53'	Report		Stadium: Dr. Constantin Rădulescu; Referee: Andrei Chivulete

30 October 2021 14	CFR Cluj	1–0	Voluntari	Cluj-Napoca
21:30 EEST (UTC+3)	Omrani 89'	Report		Stadium: Dr. Constantin Rădulescu; Referee: Cătălin Popa

7 November 2021 15	Dinamo București	0–3	CFR Cluj	Bucharest
18:30 EET (UTC+2)		Report	Omrani 14'; Debeljuh 17'; Deac 80'	Stadium: Stadionul Ştefan Cel Mare; Referee: Marian Barbu

20 November 2021 16	FC U Craiova 1948	0–2	CFR Cluj	Craiova
20:30 EET (UTC+2)		Report	Sigurjónsson 65'; Deac 89'	Stadium: Stadionul Ion Oblemenco; Referee: István Kovács

29 November 2021 17	CFR Cluj	2–0	Academica Clinceni	Cluj-Napoca
20:30 EET (UTC+2)	Costache 5'; Sigurjónsson 29'	Report		Stadium: Dr. Constantin Rădulescu; Referee: Ionuţ Coza

4 December 2021 18	Chindia Târgoviște	0–1	CFR Cluj	Ploiești
15:00 EET (UTC+2)		Report	Omrani 21'	Stadium: Stadionul Ilie Oană; Referee: Radu Petrescu

12 December 2021 19	CFR Cluj	1–0	Mioveni	Cluj-Napoca
19:30 EET (UTC+2)	Costache 36'	Report		Stadium: Dr. Constantin Rădulescu; Referee: George Găman

16 December 2021 20	Farul Constanța	0–2	CFR Cluj	Ovidiu
20:30 EET (UTC+2)		Report	Costache 37'; Chipciu 90'	Stadium: Central Stadium; Referee: Cătălin Popa

19 December 2021 21	CFR Cluj	1–0	Argeș Pitești	Cluj-Napoca
16:00 EET (UTC+2)	Debeljuh 72'	Report		Stadium: Dr. Constantin Rădulescu; Referee: Viorel Flueran

23 January 2022 22	FCSB	3–3	CFR Cluj	Bucharest
20:00 EET (UTC+2)	Popescu 24'; Gheorghe 71'; Cristea 90+3'	Report	Debeljuh 36', 40'; Chipciu 77'	Stadium: Arena Națională; Referee: Sebastian Colțescu

31 January 2022 23	CFR Cluj	1–1	Botoșani	Cluj-Napoca
20:00 EET (UTC+2)	Deac 45+1' (pen.)	Report	Dawa 81'	Stadium: Dr. Constantin Rădulescu; Referee: Adrian Cojocaru

5 February 2022 24	Universitatea Craiova	1–1	CFR Cluj	Craiova
21:00 EET (UTC+2)	Vagenin 90+6'	Report	Petrila 14'	Stadium: Stadionul Ion Oblemenco; Referee: Ovidiu Hațegan

8 February 2022 25	CFR Cluj	0–0	UTA Arad	Cluj-Napoca
17:30 EET (UTC+2)		Report		Stadium: Dr. Constantin Rădulescu; Referee: Adrian Costreie

12 February 2022 26	Gaz Metan Mediaș	1–2	CFR Cluj	Mediaș
19:55 EET (UTC+2)	Filip 64'	Report	Petrila 33'; Neguț 90+4'	Stadium: Stadionul Municipal Gaz Metan; Referee: Ionuţ Coza

20 February 2022 27	CFR Cluj	2–1	Rapid București	Cluj-Napoca
19:55 EET (UTC+2)	Graovac 43'; Deac 84'	Report	Júnior Morais 69'	Stadium: Dr. Constantin Rădulescu; Referee: Marian Barbu

26 February 2022 28	Sepsi OSK	0–2	CFR Cluj	Sfântu Gheorghe
17:30 EET (UTC+2)		Report	Camora 5'; Debeljuh 84'	Stadium: Sepsi Arena Stadium; Referee: Andrei Chivulete

2 March 2022 29	Voluntari	0–1	CFR Cluj	Voluntari
19:55 EET (UTC+2)		Report	Burcă 19'	Stadium: Stadionul Anghel Iordănescu; Referee: Horia Mladinovici

6 March 2022 30	CFR Cluj	4–1	Dinamo București	Cluj-Napoca
17:30 EET (UTC+2)	Deac 39'; Debeljuh 51', 58', 76'; Graovac (yellow card) 69'; Manea (yellow card) 79'	Report	Aloé 4'; Filip (yellow card) 39' (yellow-red card) 45+2'; Torje (not on pitch) (yellow card) 39'	Stadium: Dr. Constantin Rădulescu; Referee: Iulian Călin

==== Play-off round ====
===== Table =====
Pos	Team	Pld	W	D	L	GF	GA	GD	Pts	Qualification	CFR	FCS	UCV	VOL	FAR	ARG
1	CFR Cluj (C)	10	6	1	3	18	9	+9	57	Qualification to Champions League first qualifying round		0–1	2–1	3–1	1–0	2–0
2	FCSB	10	8	1	1	24	7	+17	56	Qualification to Europa Conference League second qualifying round	3–1		0–2	4–0	2–0	4–0
3	Universitatea Craiova (O)	10	7	0	3	22	9	+13	48	Qualification to European competition play-offs	3–2	0–1		1–0	4–1	3–0
4	Voluntari	10	3	2	5	9	14	−5	35		0–1	2–2	3–1		1–0	0–1
5	Farul Constanța	10	2	2	6	5	16	−11	32		0–0	0–4	0–3	1–1		1–0
6	Argeș Pitești	10	1	0	9	3	26	−23	27		0–6	2–3	0–4	0–1	0–2	

Source: Soccerway, FRF (in Romanian), LPF (in Romanian)
Legend: Blue = home team win; Yellow = draw; Red = away team win.
Rules for classification: 1) Points; 2) Points without rounding; 3) Head-to-head points; 4) Head-to-head goal difference; 5) Head-to-head goals scored; 6) Goal difference; 7) Goals scored; 8) Play-off (only if needed to decide champion or teams for UEFA competitions). (Note: only criteria 6 and 7 are applied to establish the classification during the competition.)
(C) Champions; (O) Play-off winners

===== Matches =====
12 March 2022 1	CFR Cluj	3–1	Voluntari	Cluj-Napoca
20:30 EET (UTC+2)	Debeljuh 50'; Deac 78'; Petrila 82'	Report	Costin 70'	Stadium: Dr. Constantin Rădulescu; Referee: Radu Petrescu

19 March 2022 2	Farul Constanța	0–0	CFR Cluj	Ovidiu
20:30 EET (UTC+2)	Nedelcu (yellow card) 51'; Boboc (yellow card) 90'	Report		Stadium: Central Stadium; Referee: Sebastian Colțescu

4 April 2022 3	CFR Cluj	2–0	Argeș Pitești	Cluj-Napoca
21:00 EEST (UTC+3)	Debeljuh 23'; Dugandžić 84'	Report		Stadium: Dr. Constantin Rădulescu; Referee: Marcel Bîrsan

10 April 2022 4	Universitatea Craiova	3–2	CFR Cluj	Craiova
20:30 EEST (UTC+3)	Crețu 18'; Marković 69'; Roguljić 90+6'	Report	Bordeianu 43'; Petrila 57'	Stadium: Stadionul Ion Oblemenco; Referee: Radu Petrescu

17 April 2022 5	CFR Cluj	0–1	FCSB	Cluj-Napoca
20:30 EEST (UTC+3)	Sušić (red card) 43'; Camora (yellow card) 50'; Boateng (yellow card) 69'; Matias (yellow card) 86'	Report	Șut (yellow card) 26'; Cordea (yellow card) 67'; Popescu 74', (yellow card) 75'; Tănase (yellow card) 78'; Târnovanu (yellow card) 88'; Gheorghe (yellow card) 90+3'	Stadium: Dr. Constantin Rădulescu; Referee: István Kovács

24 April 2022 6	Voluntari	0–1	CFR Cluj	Voluntari
19:00 EEST (UTC+3)		Report	Boateng 83'	Stadium: Stadionul Anghel Iordănescu; Referee: Adrian Cojocaru

1 May 2022 7	CFR Cluj	1–0	Farul Constanța	Cluj-Napoca
21:30 EEST (UTC+3)	Bîrligea 66'	Report		Stadium: Dr. Constantin Rădulescu; Referee: Radu Petrescu

7 May 2022 8	Argeș Pitești	0–6	CFR Cluj	Pitești
20:30 EEST (UTC+3)	Palić (yellow card) 33'; Ganea (yellow card) 77'	Report	Păun 2'; Deac 20' (pen.); Manea 37'; Graovac (yellow card) 39'; Debeljuh 45', 60'; Petrila 86'	Stadium: Stadionul Nicolae Dobrin; Referee: Andrei Chivulete

15 May 2022 9	CFR Cluj	2–1	Universitatea Craiova	Cluj-Napoca
21:30 EEST (UTC+3)	Boateng 2'; Debeljuh 56'	Report	Mateiu 61'	Stadium: Dr. Constantin Rădulescu; Referee: Radu Petrescu

22 May 2022 10	FCSB	3–1	CFR Cluj	Buzău
21:30 EEST (UTC+3)	Popescu 30'; Șut 64', 87'; Stoica (yellow card) 68'; Radunović (yellow card) 69'; Gheorghe (yellow card) 71'; Popescu (yellow card) 89'	Report	Dimitrov 45'; Matias (yellow card) 68'; Deac (yellow card) 69'	Stadium: Stadionul Municipal; Referee: Adrian Cojocaru

=== Cupa României ===
23 September 2021 Round of 32	Universitatea Craiova	1–0	CFR Cluj	Craiova
21:30 EEST (UTC+3)	Houri (yellow card) 33', (goal) 63'; Vătăjelu (yellow card) 75'; Bancu (yellow card) 89'	Report	Deac (yellow card) 16'; Ștefan (yellow card) 17'; Rodríguez (yellow card) 74'	Stadium: Stadionul Ion Oblemenco; Referee: István Kovács

=== UEFA Champions League ===
==== First qualifying round ====
6 July 2021 First leg	CFR Cluj (Romania)	3–1	(Bosnia and Herzegovina) Borac Banja Luka	Cluj-Napoca, Romania
20:00 EEST (UTC+3)	Deac (penalty missed) 11', 28'; Omrani 11', (yellow card) 64'; Păun (yellow card) 12'; Sigurjónsson 60'; Rodríguez (yellow card) 75'	Report	Vojnović (yellow card) 31'; Moraitis 45+1'; Molls (yellow card) 87'	Stadium: Dr. Constantin Rădulescu; Attendance: 4,500; Referee: Jochem Kamphuis (Netherlands)

13 July 2021 Second leg	Borac Banja Luka (Bosnia and Herzegovina)	2–1 (a.e.t.) (3–4 agg.)	(Romania) CFR Cluj	Banja Luka, Bosnia and Herzegovina
20:00 CEST (UTC+2)	Ćosić (yellow card) 10'; Dujaković (yellow card) 39'; Vranješ 60'; Moraitis 64'; Molls (yellow card) 89'; Ćorić (yellow card) 100'; Maksimović (not on pitch) (yellow card) 120'	Report	Bouhenna (yellow card) 11'; Omrani (yellow card) 63'; Chipciu (yellow card) 96', (goal) 118'; Rodríguez (yellow card) 113'	Stadium: City Stadium; Attendance: 8,300; Referee: Urs Schnyder (Switzerland)
Note: CFR Cluj won 4–3 on aggregate.

==== Second qualifying round ====
20 July 2021 First leg	Lincoln Red Imps (Gibraltar)	1–2	(Romania) CFR Cluj	Gibraltar
18:00 CEST (UTC+2)	M. Rosa (yellow card) 21', (goal) 45'; Britto (yellow card) 24'; Toscano (yellow card) 65'	Report	Debeljuh (yellow card) 38', (goal) 52', 58'	Stadium: Victoria Stadium; Attendance: 1,039; Referee: Willy Delajod (France)

28 July 2021 Second leg	CFR Cluj (Romania)	2–0 (4–1 agg.)	(Gibraltar) Lincoln Red Imps	Cluj-Napoca, Romania
20:30 EEST (UTC+3)	Cestor (yellow card) 18'; Sigurjónsson (yellow card) 58'	Report	Britto (yellow card) 9'; Toscano (yellow card) 87'	Stadium: Dr. Constantin Rădulescu; Attendance: 5,230; Referee: Yigal Frid (Israel)
Note: CFR Cluj won 4–1 on aggregate.

==== Third qualifying round ====
3 August 2021 First leg	CFR Cluj (Romania)	1–1	(Switzerland) Young Boys	Cluj-Napoca, Romania
21:00 EEST (UTC+3)	Manea 4'; Sušić (yellow card) 45+4'; Deac (yellow card) 90+2'	Report	Sierro 90+3'	Stadium: Dr. Constantin Rădulescu; Attendance: 9,500; Referee: Danny Makkelie (Netherlands)

10 August 2021 Second leg	Young Boys (Switzerland)	3–1 (4–2 agg.)	(Romania) CFR Cluj	Bern, Switzerland
20:30 CEST (UTC+2)	Pefok 23', 42'; Ngamaleu 25'; Aebischer (yellow card) 26'; Camara (yellow card) 57'; Hefti (yellow card) 66'	Report	Omrani 4'; Sigurjónsson (yellow card) 26'; Păun (yellow card) 57' (yellow-red card) 63'; Alibec (yellow card) 90+4'	Stadium: Wankdorf; Attendance: 21,145; Referee: Cüneyt Çakır (Turkey)
Note: Young Boys won 4–2 on aggregate.

=== UEFA Europa League ===
==== Play-off round ====
17 August 2021 First leg	Red Star Belgrade (Serbia)	4–0	(Romania) CFR Cluj	Belgrade, Serbia
21:00 CEST (UTC+2)	Pavkov 5'; Rodić (yellow card) 33'; Katai 38', (yellow card) 79'; Ben 68'; Kanga (yellow card) 71'; Ivanić 77'	Report		Stadium: Red Star Stadium; Attendance: 22,482; Referee: Georgi Kabakov (Bulgaria)

26 August 2021 Second leg	CFR Cluj (Romania)	1–2 (1–6 agg.)	(Serbia) Red Star Belgrade	Cluj-Napoca, Romania
21:30 EEST (UTC+3)	Debeljuh 34'; Sigurjónsson (yellow card) 41'; Deac (penalty missed) 63'; Rodríguez (yellow card) 69' (yellow-red card) 78'	Report	Katai 5' (pen.); Degenek (yellow card) 16'; Rodić (yellow card) 31'; Sanogo (yellow card) 39'; Pavkov 53'; Dragović (yellow card) 62'	Stadium: Dr. Constantin Rădulescu; Attendance: 4,200; Referee: Michael Oliver (England)
Note: Red Star Belgrade won 6–1 on aggregate.

=== UEFA Europa Conference League ===
==== Group stage ====
The draw for the group stage was held on 27 August 2021, 13:30 CEST (14:30 TRT), in Istanbul, Turkey.

Pos	Team	Pld	W	D	L	GF	GA	GD	Pts	Qualification	AZ	RAN	JAB	CLJ
1	(Netherlands) AZ	6	4	2	0	8	3	+5	14	Advance to round of 16	—	1–0	1–0	2–0
2	(Denmark) Randers	6	1	4	1	9	9	0	7	Advance to knockout round play-offs	2–2	—	2–2	2–1
3	(Czech Republic) Jablonec	6	1	3	2	6	8	−2	6		1–1	2–2	—	1–0
4	(Romania) CFR Cluj	6	1	1	4	4	7	−3	4		0–1	1–1	2–0	—

Source: UEFA
Rules for classification: Group stage tiebreakers

16 September 2021 1	Jablonec (Czech Republic)	1–0	(Romania) CFR Cluj	Jablonec nad Nisou, Czech Republic
21:00 CEST (UTC+2)	Doležal (yellow card) 41'; Pilař 52' (pen.), (yellow card) 69'; Houska (yellow card) 57'; Rada (not on pitch) (yellow card) 76'	Report	Camora (red card) 51'; D. Petrescu (not on pitch) (yellow card) 82'; Bouhenna (yellow card) 89'	Stadium: Stadion Střelnice; Attendance: 2,470; Referee: Enea Jorgji (Albania)

30 September 2021 2	CFR Cluj (Romania)	1–1	(Denmark) Randers	Cluj-Napoca, Romania
19:45 EEST (UTC+3)	Petrila 68'	Report	Kamara 41'	Stadium: Dr. Constantin Rădulescu; Attendance: 3,825; Referee: Davide Massa (Italy)

21 October 2021 3	CFR Cluj (Romania)	0–1	(Netherlands) AZ	Cluj-Napoca, Romania
22:00 EEST (UTC+3)	Burcă (yellow card) 27'; Culio (yellow card) 45+1'; Debeljuh (yellow card) 61'	Report	Karlsson 18'; Pavlidis (yellow card) 50'	Stadium: Dr. Constantin Rădulescu; Attendance: 3,628; Referee: Halis Özkahya (Turkey)

4 November 2021 4	AZ (Netherlands)	2–0	(Romania) CFR Cluj	Alkmaar, Netherlands
18:45 CET (UTC+1)	A. Guðmundsson 5'; Chatzidiakos (yellow card) 52'; Sugawara (yellow card) 69'; Pavlidis 86'	Report	Alibec (yellow card) 24'; Burcă (yellow card) 59'; Culio (yellow card) 73'	Stadium: AFAS Stadion; Attendance: 10,554; Referee: Alain Durieux (Luxembourg)

25 November 2021 5	Randers (Denmark)	2–1	(Romania) CFR Cluj	Randers, Denmark
21:00 CET (UTC+1)	Kamara 68'; Piesinger 76'; Hammershøy-Mistrati (yellow card) 88'	Report	Deac 72'; Boateng (yellow card) 75'; Camora (yellow card) 90+4'	Stadium: Randers Stadium; Attendance: 4,309; Referee: Don Robertson (Scotland)

9 December 2021 6	CFR Cluj (Romania)	2–0	(Czech Republic) Jablonec	Cluj-Napoca, Romania
19:45 EEST (UTC+3)	Debeljuh 45', 82'; Bordeianu (yellow card) 55'; Alibec (yellow card) 86'	Report	Kubista (yellow card) 80'; Surzyn (yellow card) 89'	Stadium: Dr. Constantin Rădulescu; Attendance: 2,400; Referee: Harm Osmers (Germany)
