= FC Noah =

Association football club in Armenia

Noah
- Full name: Football Club Noah
- Founded: 2017; 9 years ago
- Ground: Abovyan City Stadium
- Capacity: 3,946
- Owner: Vardges Vardanyan
- Head coach: Pablo García
- League: Armenian Premier League
- 2025–26: Armenian Premier League, 2nd of 10
- Website: noah.am
Home colours	Away colours

Football Club Noah (Armenian: Ֆուտբոլային Ակումբ Նոա, romanized: Futbolayin Akumb Noa), commonly known as Noah, is an Armenian professional football club based in Abovyan. Founded in 2017 as FC Artsakh, they currently play in the Armenian Premier League.

== History ==
The club was founded as FC Artsakh in 2017 and played its first match in a goalless draw against FC Banants on 2 June 2017. Noah played its first competitive season in the 2017–18 Armenian First League, finishing second and achieving promotion to the Armenian Premier League.

After a disappointing 8th-place finish in the 2018–19 season, the club was sold to Karen Abrahamyan, who rebranded it as FC Noah in 2019. The name references the biblical Noah, whose Ark came to rest on Mountains of Ararat, traditionally identified with Mount Ararat. Noah won the 2019–20 Armenian Cup, defeating Ararat-Armenia on penalties.

In 2024, they qualified for the UEFA Conference League league phase after defeating Ružomberok 4–3 on aggregate in the play-off round, becoming the first club in Conference League history to successfully navigate all four rounds of qualification. They had beaten Shkëndija, Sliema Wanderers and Greek powerhouse AEK Athens in the previous qualifying rounds.

At the end of the 2024–25 season, Noah completed their first League and Cup double.

Noah, in the 2025/26 season, became the first Armenian club to qualify for the main stage of a European club competition for the second year in a row. That same season, Noah became the first club in Armenian history to reach the playoff stage of a European tournament.

== Records ==
=== Domestic ===
Season	League									National cup	Top goalscorer		Manager	Kit manufacturer	Main sponsor
Season	Div.	Pos.	Pl.	W	D	L	GS	GA	P	National cup	Name	League	Manager	Kit manufacturer	Main sponsor
2017–18	Armenian First League	2nd	27	21	2	4	77	16	65	Quarter-finals	(Armenia) Grigor Aghekyan	18	(Armenia) Tigran Yesayan (Armenia) Armen Sanamyan	Nike	Renault
2018–19	Armenian Premier League	8th	32	6	10	16	25	49	28	Quarter-finals	(Armenia) Eduard Avagyan (Armenia) Vigen Avetisyan	4	(Armenia) Rafael Nazaryan (Armenia) Sevada Arzumanyan	Nike	Vega
2019–20	Armenian Premier League	2nd	28	14	6	8	37	27	48	Winners	(Russia) Maksim Mayrovich	11	(Moldova) Vadim Boreț	Umbro	N/A
2020–21	Armenian Premier League	2nd	28	12	5	7	35	20	41	Semifinal	(Russia) Vladimir Azarov	6	(Moldova) Vadim Boreț (Russia) Dmitri Gunko	Adidas	N/A
2021–22	Armenian Premier League	6th	32	9	12	11	38	43	39	Quarter-finals	(Russia) Maksim Mayrovich	9	(Russia) Viktor Bulatov (Armenia) Aram Hakobyan	Adidas	VBET
2022–23	Armenian Premier League	8th	36	8	8	20	34	66	32	Quarter-finals	(Armenia) Levon Vardanyan	8	(Armenia) Robert Arzumanyan	Adidas	VBET
2023–24	Armenian Premier League	2nd	36	26	2	8	69	33	80	Quarter-finals	(Armenia) Artur Miranyan	23	(Armenia) Robert Arzumanyan (Spain) Carlos Inarejos	Adidas	to.sport fm 96.3
2024–25	Armenian Premier League	1st	30	24	3	3	92	20	75	Winners	(Portugal) Gonçalo Gregório	20	(Portugal) Rui Mota	Adidas	Imagine Live
2025–26	Armenian Premier League	2nd	27	16	8	3	61	19	56	Winners	(Bosnia and Herzegovina) Nardin Mulahusejnović (Portugal) Hélder Ferreira (Brazil) Matheus Aiás	10	(Croatia) Sandro Perković	Adidas	Imagine Live

=== European ===
As of match played 13 August 2026

Competition	Pld	W	D	L	GF	GA	GD
UEFA Champions League	4	1	1	2	7	8	–1
UEFA Europa League	3	0	2	1	2	5	–3
UEFA Conference League	30	13	6	11	45	47	–2
Total	37	14	9	14	54	60	–6

Season	Competition	Round	Club	Home	Away	Aggregate
2020–21	UEFA Europa League	1QR	(Kazakhstan) Kairat	—N/a	1–4	—N/a
2021–22	UEFA Europa Conference League	1QR	(Finland) KuPS	1–0	0–5	1–5
2024–25	UEFA Conference League	1QR	(North Macedonia) Shkëndija	2–0	2–1	4–1
2024–25	UEFA Conference League	2QR	(Malta) Sliema Wanderers	7–0	0–0	7–0
2024–25	UEFA Conference League	3QR	(Greece) AEK Athens	3–1	0–1	3–2
2024–25	UEFA Conference League	PO	(Slovakia) Ružomberok	3–0	1–3	4–3
2024–25	UEFA Conference League	League phase	(Czech Republic) Mladá Boleslav	2–0	—N/a	31st
2024–25	UEFA Conference League	League phase	(Austria) Rapid Wien	—N/a	0–1	31st
2024–25	UEFA Conference League	League phase	(England) Chelsea	—N/a	0–8	31st
2024–25	UEFA Conference League	League phase	(Iceland) Víkingur Reykjavík	0–0	—N/a	31st
2024–25	UEFA Conference League	League phase	(Cyprus) APOEL	1–3	—N/a	31st
2024–25	UEFA Conference League	League phase	(Serbia) TSC	—N/a	3–4	31st
2025–26	UEFA Champions League	1QR	(Montenegro) Budućnost Podgorica	1–0	2–2	3–2
2025–26	UEFA Champions League	2QR	(Hungary) Ferencváros	1–2	3–4	4–6
2025–26	UEFA Europa League	3QR	(Gibraltar) Lincoln Red Imps	0–0 (a.e.t.)	1–1	1–1 (5–6 p)
2025–26	UEFA Conference League	PO	(Slovenia) Olimpija Ljubljana	4–1	3–2	7–3
2025–26	UEFA Conference League	League phase	(Croatia) Rijeka	1–0	—N/a	19th
2025–26	UEFA Conference League	League phase	(Romania) Universitatea Craiova	—N/a	1–1	19th
2025–26	UEFA Conference League	League phase	(Czech Republic) Sigma Olomouc	1–2	—N/a	19th
2025–26	UEFA Conference League	League phase	(Scotland) Aberdeen	—N/a	1–1	19th
2025–26	UEFA Conference League	League phase	(Poland) Legia Warsaw	2–1	—N/a	19th
2025–26	UEFA Conference League	League phase	(Ukraine) Dynamo Kyiv	—N/a	0–2	19th
2025–26	UEFA Conference League	KPO	(Netherlands) AZ	1–0	0–4	1–4
2026–27	UEFA Conference League	2QR	(Moldova) Zimbru Chișinău	2–1	1–1	3–2
2026–27	UEFA Conference League	3QR	(Switzerland) Sion	2–2	1–2	3–4

==== UEFA Club Ranking ====
UEFA coefficient

As of 8 November 2024

Rank	Team	Points
282	(Ukraine) Kolos Kovalivka	4.680
283	(Ukraine) Desna Chernihiv	4.680
284	(Armenia) FC Noah	4.500
285	(Kazakhstan) Ordabasy	4.500
286	(Georgia (country)) Iberia	4.500

== Colours and badge ==
As FC Artsakh the club's main kit colours were red and white, however following the rebranding, the club chose black and a light green to represent the club. Umbro became the kit supplier for the 2019–20, following two years of using Nike.

=== Badge history ===
From 2017 to 2019, the club operated as FC Artsakh, bearing a red round badge with an eagle. Following the 2019 rebranding as FC Noah, the club's emblem was changed to a simple black text "Yerevan Armenia Football Club Noah".

From 2024-25 season FC Noah rebranded own logo.

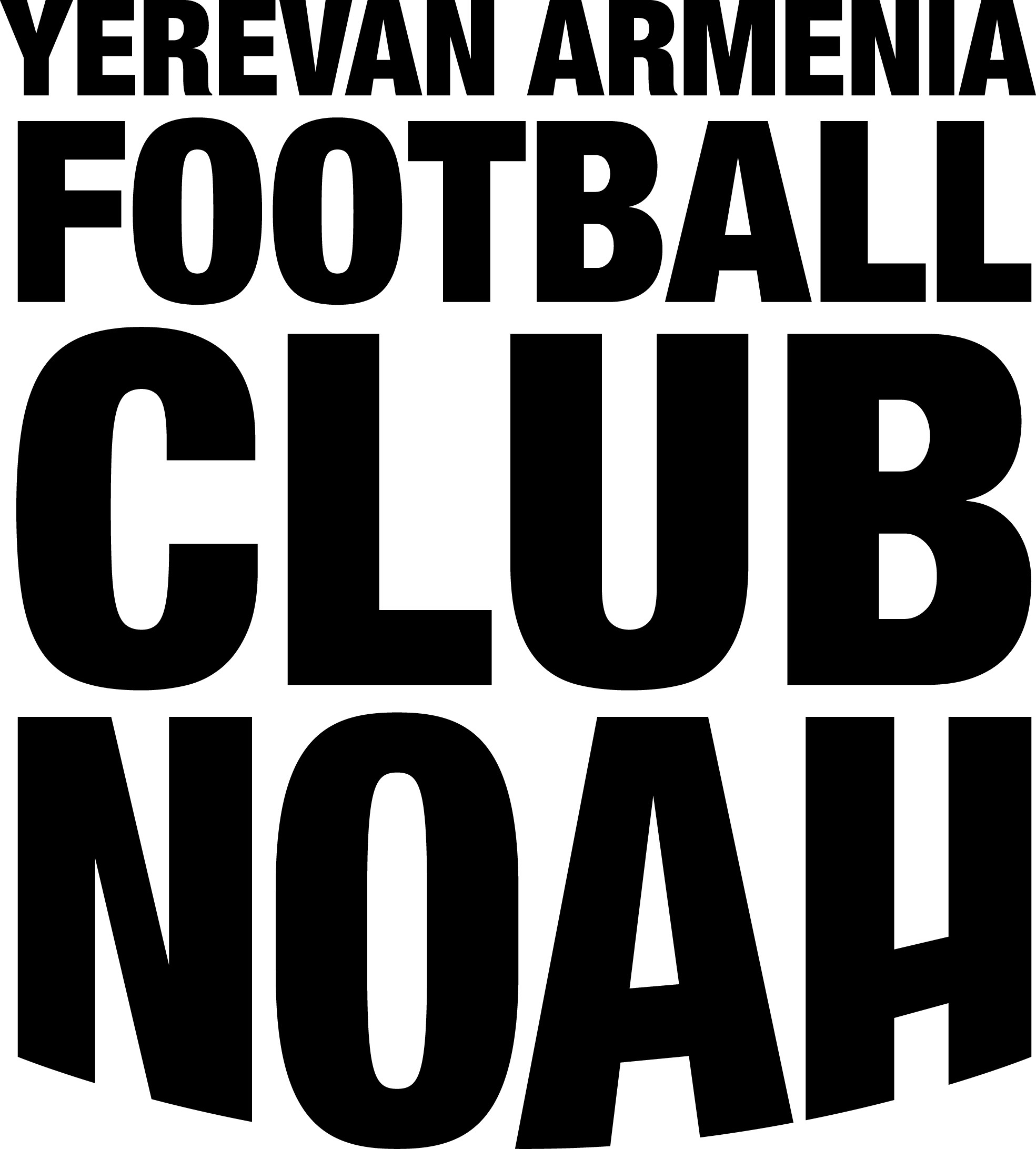
Club crest (2019–2024)

Club crest (since 2024)

== Stadium ==
At the beginning phase of the 2018–19 Armenian Premier League season, FC Noah used the Mika Stadium, located in the Shengavit neighborhood of Yerevan, as their home ground until matchday 8. They were then forced to leave the Mika Stadium due to inappropriate pitch conditions, and between matchdays 9 and 14 they played at the Pyunik Stadium before moving to the artificial-turf pitch of the Dzoraghbyur Training Centre on the eastern outskirts of Yerevan. For the 2019–20 Armenian Premier League season, FC Noah played at the Alashkert Stadium, located in the same neighborhood of Yerevan.

After starting the 2021–22 Armenian Premier League season playing their home games at the Yerevan Football Academy Stadium in Yerevan, Noah moved their home games to the Armavir City Stadium in Armavir in February 2022.

From the 2023–24 Armenian Premier League season, FC Noah started to play at the Abovyan City Stadium named after Vahagn Tumasyan.

== Players ==
=== Current squad ===
As of 12 October 2026

Note: Flags indicate national team as defined under FIFA eligibility rules; some limited exceptions apply. Players may hold more than one non-FIFA nationality.

No.	Pos.	Nation	Player
3	DF	ARM	Sergey Muradyan
4	DF	FRA	Stone Mambo
5	DF	ARM	Mark Avetisyan
6	DF	GHA	Eric Boakye
7	FW	POR	Hélder Ferreira
8	FW	SRB	Marko Lazetić
9	FW	ESP	Mario González
10	MF	ARM	Gor Manvelyan
12	DF	GHA	Clinton Dombila
14	MF	JPN	Takuto Oshima
16	MF	SRB	Saša Zdjelar
17	MF	BFA	Gustavo Sangaré
19	DF	ARM	Hovhannes Hambardzumyan (captain)
20	MF	ROU	Valentin Costache

No.	Pos.	Nation	Player
21	DF	SLO	Michael Pavlović
23	MF	ARM	Aram Khamoyan
24	FW	ARM	Zaven Khudaverdyan
29	GK	ARM	Arthur Coneglian
33	DF	POR	David Sualehe
39	DF	GLP	Nathanaël Saintini
44	FW	CRO	Marin Jakoliš
52	FW	GRE	Marios Sofianos
57	FW	ARM	Albert Gareginyan
71	MF	FRA	Bilal Fofana
88	MF	CMR	Yan Eteki
98	FW	GHA	Brian Oddei
99	GK	POR	Dani Figueira

=== Out on loan ===
Note: Flags indicate national team as defined under FIFA eligibility rules; some limited exceptions apply. Players may hold more than one non-FIFA nationality.

No.	Pos.	Nation	Player
12	GK	ARM	Artyom Davidov (at BKMA Yerevan)

== Coaching staff ==
Position	Name
Head coach	(Uruguay) Pablo García
Assistant coach	(Poland) Mirosław Sznaucner
Goalkeeper coach	(Greece) Vasileios Kliafas
Fitness Coach	(Greece) Pavlos Gkotsis
Video analyst	(Uruguay) Benjamin García

== Management ==
Position	Name
President	Vardges Vardanyan
Chief operating officer	Gurgen Ohanyan
Sporting director	Hayk Hovakimyan
Development director	Anna Ohanyan
Team manager	Vardan Movsisyan

== Honours ==
FC Noah won their first trophy on 10 July 2020, defeating Ararat-Armenia on penalties to win the 2019–20 Armenian Cup.

=== Domestic ===
- Armenian Premier League
  - Winners (1): 2024–25
- Armenian Cup
  - Winners (3): 2019–20, 2024–25, 2025–26
- Armenian Supercup
  - Winners (2): 2020, 2025

== Player records ==
=== Most appearances ===
As of match played 7 November 2026

	Name	Years	League	Armenian Cup	Supercup	Europe	Total
1	(Armenia) Sergey Muradyan	2023–Present	87 (2)	9 (0)	1 (0)	30 (0)	127 (2)
2	(Armenia) Gor Manvelyan	2023–Present	76 (13)	12 (1)	1 (0)	27 (3)	116 (17)
3	(Armenia) Hovhannes Hambardzumyan	2023–Present	71 (6)	11 (2)	1 (0)	21 (1)	104 (9)
4	(Portugal) Hélder Ferreira	2024–Present	57 (27)	11 (5)	1 (1)	34 (6)	103 (39)
5	(Burkina Faso) Gustavo Sangaré	2024–Present	44 (4)	7 (0)	1 (0)	32 (1)	84 (5)
6	(Brazil) Matheus Aiás	2024–2026	38 (19)	9 (4)	(-)	30 (9)	77 (32)
7	(Armenia) Benik Hovhannisyan	2019–2022	61 (2)	6 (1)	1 (0)	3 (0)	71 (3)
8	(Russia) Maksim Mayrovich	2019–2021, 2021–2022	63 (22)	6 (4)	(-)	0 (0)	69 (26)
8	(Portugal) Gonçalo Silva	2024–2026	38 (1)	7 (0)	0 (0)	24 (0)	69 (4)
10	(Armenia) Yuri Gareginyan	2018–2021	57 (3)	7 (0)	1 (0)	0 (0)	65 (3)
10	(Netherlands) Imran Oulad Omar	2024–2026	36 (11)	7 (1)	(-)	22 (5)	65 (17)
10	(Cameroon) Yan Eteki	2024–Present	36 (0)	8 (0)	1 (0)	20 (1)	65 (1)

=== Top goalscorers ===
As of match played 7 November 2026

	Name	Years	League	Armenian Cup	Supercup	Europe	Total	Ratio
1	(Portugal) Hélder Ferreira	2024–Present	27 (57)	5 (11)	1 (1)	6 (34)	39 (103)	0.38
2	(Brazil) Matheus Aiás	2024–2026	19 (38)	4 (9)	(-)	9 (30)	32 (77)	0.42
3	(Portugal) Gonçalo Gregório	2024–2026	20 (28)	1 (3)	(-)	6 (17)	27 (48)	0.56
4	(Russia) Maksim Mayrovich	2019–2021, 2021–2022	22 (63)	4 (6)	(-)	0 (0)	26 (69)	0.38
5	(Armenia) Artur Miranyan	2023–2024	23 (36)	1 (2)	(-)	(-)	24 (38)	0.63
6	(Armenia) Grigor Aghekyan	2017–2019	19 (40)	2 (5)	(-)	(-)	21 (45)	0.47
7	(Russia) Vladimir Azarov	2019–2021	14 (41)	3 (9)	0 (0)	0 (1)	17 (51)	0.33
7	(Armenia) Gor Manvelyan	2023–Present	13 (76)	1 (12)	0 (1)	3 (27)	17 (116)	0.15
10	(Albania) Eraldo Çinari	2024–2025	14 (26)	1 (5)	(-)	1 (12)	16 (43)	0.37
10	(Bosnia and Herzegovina) Nardin Mulahusejnović	2025–2026	10 (25)	1 (5)	0 (1)	5 (12)	16 (43)	0.37

=== Clean sheets ===
As of match played 7 November 2026

	Name	Years	League	Armenian Cup	Supercup	Europe	Total	Ratio
1	(Italy) Valerio Vimercati	2019–2021, 2023–2024	24 (55)	3 (7)	0 (1)	0 (1)	27 (64)	0.42
2	(Armenia) Ognjen Čančarević	2024–2026	16 (39)	1 (3)	0 (0)	6 (19)	23 (61)	0.38
3	(Brazil) Arthur Coneglian	2024–Present	12 (18)	4 (5)	(-)	0 (0)	16 (23)	0.7
4	(Russia) Aleksey Ploshchadny	2024–2026	11 (16)	1 (2)	0 (1)	3 (6)	15 (25)	0.6
5	(Armenia) Arman Meliksetyan	2018–2019	8 (22)	1 (4)	(-)	(-)	9 (26)	0.35
5	(Armenia) Vardan Shahatuni	2022	8 (22)	1 (2)	(-)	0 (0)	9 (24)	0.38
7	(Armenia) Grigor Makaryan	2017–2018	7 (14)	0 (1)	(-)	(-)	7 (15)	0.47
7	(Russia) Samur Agamagomedov	2018–2019	7 (19)	0 (0)	(-)	(-)	7 (19)	0.37
9	(Portugal) Dani Figueira	2026–Present	5 (8)	0 (1)	0 (0)	0 (4)	5 (13)	0.38
10	(Russia) Maksim Shvagirev	2019–2021	2 (4)	2 (4)	(-)	(-)	4 (8)	0.67
10	(Republic of the Congo) Christoffer Mafoumbi	2023	4 (9)	0 (0)	0 (0)	0 (0)	4 (9)	0.44

== See also ==
- Football in Armenia
- Football Federation of Armenia
