= Saša Zdjelar =

Serbian footballer (born 1995)

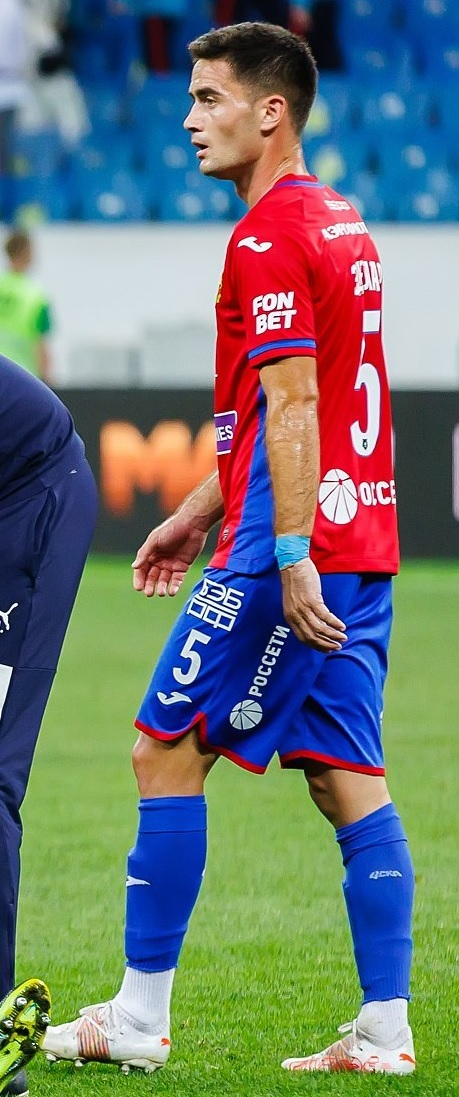
- Zdjelar with CSKA Moscow in 2022

Personal information
- Date of birth: 20 March 1995 (age 31)
- Place of birth: Belgrade, FR Yugoslavia
- Height: 1.84 m (6 ft 0 in)
- Position: Defensive midfielder

Team information
- Current team: Noah
- Number: 16

Youth career
- OFK Beograd

Senior career*
| Years | Team | Apps | (Gls) |
| 2011–2015 | OFK Beograd | 62 | (0) |
| 2015–2018 | Olympiacos | 12 | (0) |
| 2017 | → Mallorca (loan) | 15 | (0) |
| 2018 | → Partizan (loan) | 12 | (2) |
| 2018–2022 | Partizan | 126 | (3) |
| 2022–2024 | CSKA Moscow | 70 | (1) |
| 2025 | Zenit Saint Petersburg | 7 | (0) |
| 2026 | Partizan | 13 | (0) |
| 2026– | Noah | 4 | (0) |

International career^{‡}
| 2011–2012 | Serbia U17 (Note: Only official UEFA matches included) | 6 | (1) |
| 2013–2014 | Serbia U19 | 8 | (0) |
| 2014–2015 | Serbia U20 | 12 | (0) |
| 2015–2017 | Serbia U21 | 6 | (0) |
| 2016– | Serbia | 9 | (0) |
Medal record
| Gold medal – first place | FIFA U-20 World Cup | 2015 |
- * Club domestic league appearances and goals as of 29 October 2026 ‡ National team caps and goals as of 23:19, 18 November 2024 (UTC)

Saša Zdjelar (Serbian Cyrillic: Саша Здјелар; born 20 March 1995) is a Serbian professional footballer who plays for Armenian Premier League club Noah. His primary position is defensive midfielder and he also plays as centre-back.

== Club career ==
Zdjelar made his senior debut for OFK Beograd in a 3–0 home league win over Novi Pazar on 3 December 2011, aged 16. He was later sold to Greek champions Olympiacos in 2013, but remained at his parent club for the next two years. In total, Zdjelar recorded 67 competitive appearances with the Romantičari.

In the summer of 2015, Zdjelar eventually moved to Greece and joined Olympiacos. He made his debut for the club on 28 October 2015, playing the full 90 minutes in a 2–2 Greek Cup draw versus Platanias. On 13 January 2016, Zdjelar scored his first ever senior goal for Olympiacos in a 6–0 Greek Cup win over Chania.

On 13 January 2017, Zdjelar was loaned to Spanish Segunda División side RCD Mallorca until the end of the season.

On 29 January 2018, he was loaned to Partizan until the end of the 2017–18 season, after being put on Olympiacos' out-of-favour list. At the end of the 2017–18 season, Partizan announced the signing of the player for an estimated fee at the range of €500,000 On 23 May 2018, Zdjelar scored the winner against Mladost Lučani, in the Serbian Cup final.

In 2018–19 season, Zdjelar won his second Serbian Cup trophy and collected 45 appearances for Partizan, across three competitions.

After an assist by Umar Sadiq, Zdjelar scored a goal from 20 meters away in a 4–0 win over Vojvodina in the Derby of Serbia. In 2019–20 season, interrupted due to global pandemic of COVID-19, Zdjelar was again the most capped Partizan player, amassing 42 appearances (and skipping only 3 games) across all competitions.

In July 2020, he wore Partizan's captain armband for the first time.

On 28 July 2022, Zdjelar signed a contract with Russian Premier League club CSKA Moscow for three years with an option to extend.

On 21 February 2025, Zdjelar signed with Russian champions Zenit St. Petersburg until the end of the 2025–26 season. On 29 August 2025, he left Zenit by mutual consent.

On 16 September 2026, Armenian Premier League club Noah announced the signing of Zdjelar.

== International career ==
Zdjelar represented Serbia at the 2014 UEFA Under-19 Championship, as the team was eliminated in the semi-final by Portugal after penalties. He was also a member of the team that won the gold medal at the 2015 FIFA U-20 World Cup.

On 31 May 2016, Zdjelar made his full international debut for Serbia, coming on as a substitute in a 3–1 friendly win over Israel. He subsequently appeared as an injury-time substitute in a 1–1 friendly draw with Russia at Stade Louis II five days later.

== Career statistics ==
=== Club ===
As of match played 29 October 2026

Appearances and goals by club, season and competition
| Club | Season | League | | | National cup (Note: Includes Serbian Cup, Greek Football Cup, Russian Cup, Armenian Cup) | | Europe | | Other | | Total | |
| Club | Season | Division | Apps | Goals | Apps | Goals | Apps | Goals | Apps | Goals | Apps | Goals |
|---|---|---|---|---|---|---|---|---|---|---|---|---|
| OFK Beograd | 2011–12 | Serbian SuperLiga | 1 | 0 | 0 | 0 | 0 | 0 | — | | 1 | 0 |
| OFK Beograd | 2012–13 | Serbian SuperLiga | 15 | 0 | 1 | 0 | 0 | 0 | — | | 16 | 0 |
| OFK Beograd | 2013–14 | Serbian SuperLiga | 27 | 0 | 3 | 0 | 0 | 0 | — | | 30 | 0 |
| OFK Beograd | 2014–15 | Serbian SuperLiga | 19 | 0 | 1 | 0 | 0 | 0 | — | | 20 | 0 |
| OFK Beograd | Total | | 62 | 0 | 5 | 0 | 0 | 0 | — | | 67 | 0 |
| Olympiacos | 2015–16 | Super League Greece | 8 | 0 | 6 | 1 | 2 | 0 | — | | 16 | 1 |
| Olympiacos | 2016–17 | Super League Greece | 0 | 0 | 0 | 0 | 1 (Note: Appearance(s) in UEFA Champions League) | 0 | — | | 1 | 0 |
| Olympiacos | 2017–18 | Super League Greece | 4 | 0 | 2 | 0 | 5 | 0 | — | | 11 | 0 |
| Olympiacos | Total | | 12 | 0 | 8 | 1 | 8 | 0 | — | | 28 | 1 |
| Mallorca (loan) | 2016–17 | Segunda División | 15 | 0 | 0 | 0 | 0 | 0 | — | | 15 | 0 |
| Partizan (loan) | 2017–18 | Serbian SuperLiga | 12 | 2 | 4 | 1 | 1 (Note: Appearance(s) in UEFA Europa League) | 0 | — | | 17 | 3 |
| Partizan | 2018–19 | Serbian SuperLiga | 32 | 1 | 5 | 0 | 8 | 0 | — | | 45 | 1 |
| Partizan | 2019–20 | Serbian SuperLiga | 28 | 1 | 4 | 0 | 12 | 0 | — | | 44 | 1 |
| Partizan | 2020–21 | Serbian SuperLiga | 31 | 1 | 4 | 0 | 3 | 0 | — | | 38 | 1 |
| Partizan | 2021–22 | Serbian SuperLiga | 32 | 0 | 4 | 0 | 14 (Note: Appearances in UEFA Europa Conference League) | 0 | — | | 50 | 0 |
| Partizan | 2022–23 | Serbian SuperLiga | 3 | 0 | 0 | 0 | 0 | 0 | — | | 3 | 0 |
| Partizan | Total | | 126 | 3 | 17 | 0 | 37 | 0 | — | | 180 | 3 |
| CSKA Moscow | 2022–23 | Russian Premier League | 27 | 0 | 11 | 0 | — | | — | | 38 | 0 |
| CSKA Moscow | 2023–24 | Russian Premier League | 28 | 1 | 8 | 0 | — | | 1 (Note: Appearance in Russian Super Cup) | 0 | 37 | 1 |
| CSKA Moscow | 2024–25 | Russian Premier League | 15 | 0 | 6 | 0 | — | | — | | 21 | 0 |
| CSKA Moscow | Total | | 70 | 1 | 25 | 0 | — | | 1 | 0 | 96 | 1 |
| Zenit St. Petersburg | 2024–25 | Russian Premier League | 7 | 0 | 2 | 0 | — | | — | | 9 | 0 |
| Zenit St. Petersburg | 2025–26 | Russian Premier League | 0 | 0 | 1 | 0 | — | | — | | 1 | 0 |
| Zenit St. Petersburg | Total | | 7 | 0 | 3 | 0 | 0 | 0 | 0 | 0 | 10 | 0 |
| Partizan | 2025–26 | Serbian SuperLiga | 13 | 0 | — | | — | | — | | 13 | 0 |
| Noah | 2026–27 | Armenian Premier League | 4 | 0 | 0 | 0 | 0 (Note: Appearance(s) in UEFA Conference League) | 0 | 0 (Note: Appearance(s) in Armenian Supercup) | 0 | 4 | 0 |
| Career total | | | 321 | 6 | 62 | 2 | 46 | 0 | 1 | 0 | 430 | 8 |

=== International ===
As of match played 18 November 2024

| National team | Year | Apps | Goals |
|---|---|---|---|
| Serbia | 2016 | 2 | 0 |
| Serbia | 2017 | 0 | 0 |
| Serbia | 2018 | 0 | 0 |
| Serbia | 2019 | 0 | 0 |
| Serbia | 2020 | 1 | 0 |
| Serbia | 2021 | 0 | 0 |
| Serbia | 2022 | 0 | 0 |
| Serbia | 2023 | 0 | 0 |
| Serbia | 2024 | 6 | 0 |
| Total | | 9 | 0 |

== Honours ==
Olympiacos

- Super League Greece: 2015–16

Partizan

- Serbian Cup: 2017–18, 2018–19

CSKA Moscow

- Russian Cup: 2022–23, 2024–25

Serbia U20

- FIFA U-20 World Cup: 2015
