= Hélder Ferreira (footballer, born 1997) =

Portuguese footballer

Personal information
- Full name: Hélder José Castro Ferreira
- Date of birth: 5 April 1997 (age 29)
- Place of birth: Fafe, Portugal
- Height: 1.79 m (5 ft 10 in)
- Position: Winger

Team information
- Current team: Noah
- Number: 7

Youth career
- 2006–2007: Fafe
- 2007–2008: Vitória Guimarães
- 2008–2009: Benfica
- 2009–2010: Vitória Guimarães
- 2010–2011: Sandinenses
- 2011–2012: Vitória Guimarães
- 2012–2013: Sandinenses
- 2013–2016: Vitória Guimarães

Senior career*
Years	Team	Apps	(Gls)
2015–2019	Vitória Guimarães B	79	(7)
2017–2019	Vitória Guimarães	14	(1)
2019–2022	Paços Ferreira	97	(9)
2022–2024	Anorthosis	67	(9)
2024–	Noah	54	(26)

International career
2014–2015	Portugal U18	5	(0)
2016	Portugal U19	1	(0)
2017	Portugal U20	7	(2)
- * Club domestic league appearances and goals as of 11:19, 19 October 2026 (UTC)

Hélder José Castro Ferreira (born 5 April 1997) is a Portuguese professional footballer who plays as a right winger for Armenian Premier League club Noah.

== Club career ==
=== Vitória Guimarães ===
Ferreira was born in Fafe, Braga District. He spent the better part of his first four seasons as a senior with Vitória de Guimarães' reserves in the LigaPro, making his league debut on 25 November 2015 in a 0–1 home loss against C.D. Feirense when he was still a junior. He scored his first goal on 24 April 2016 to close a 3–3 draw at S.L. Benfica B, adding a brace the following month in the 3–1 home victory over FC Porto B.

Ferreira totalled 25 first-team appearances during his spell at the Estádio D. Afonso Henriques. He scored his only goal on 11 December 2017, in a 1–0 Primeira Liga home defeat of Feirense.

=== Paços Ferreira ===
On 27 June 2019, Ferreira signed a three-year contract with newly-promoted F.C. Paços de Ferreira. He netted four times from 33 appearances in the 2020–21 campaign, as the club finished fifth and qualified for the UEFA Europa Conference League.

=== Anorthosis ===
On 21 July 2022, Ferreira joined Anorthosis Famagusta FC of the Cypriot First Division on a two-year deal. He totalled 71 games during his tenure, scoring 12 goals.

=== Noah ===
On 24 June 2024, Ferreira moved to the Armenian Premier League with FC Noah. In July 2025, shortly after winning the double, he renewed his contract at the latter until summer 2027, with the option for an additional year.

Ferreira agreed to another extension at Noah on 3 August 2026, this time running until 30 June 2028.

== International career ==
Ferreira represented Portugal at the 2017 FIFA U-20 World Cup in South Korea, scoring against Zambia (2–1 group-stage loss) in an eventual quarter-final exit.

== Career statistics ==
As of match played 18 October 2026

Appearances and goals by club, season and competition
Club	Season	League			National Cup		Europe		Other		Total	
Club	Season	Division	Apps	Goals	Apps	Goals	Apps	Goals	Apps	Goals	Apps	Goals
Vitória Guimarães B	2015–16	LigaPro	5	3	0	0	—		—		5	3
Vitória Guimarães B	2016–17	LigaPro	39	2	0	0	—		—		39	2
Vitória Guimarães B	2017–18	LigaPro	11	0	0	0	—		—		11	0
Vitória Guimarães B	2018–19	LigaPro	24	2	0	0	—		—		24	2
Vitória Guimarães B	Total		79	7	0	0	—		—		79	7
Vitória Guimarães	2017–18	Primeira Liga	11	1	5	0	5 (Note: Appearances in UEFA Europa League)	0	—		21	1
Vitória Guimarães	2018–19	Primeira Liga	3	0	1	0	—		—		4	0
Vitória Guimarães	Total		14	1	6	0	5	0	—		25	1
Paços Ferreira	2019–20	Primeira Liga	32	3	5	0	—		—		37	3
Paços Ferreira	2020–21	Primeira Liga	33	4	2	0	—		—		35	4
Paços Ferreira	2021–22	Primeira Liga	32	2	3	0	4 (Note: Appearances in UEFA Conference League)	0	—		39	2
Paços Ferreira	Total		97	9	10	0	4	0	—		111	9
Anorthosis	2022–23	Cypriot First Division	34	3	2	3	—		—		36	6
Anorthosis	2023–24	Cypriot First Division	33	6	2	0	—		—		35	6
Anorthosis	Total		67	9	4	3	0	0	0	0	71	12
Noah	2024–25	Armenian Premier League	23	9	5	2	14	2	—		42	13
Noah	2025–26	Armenian Premier League	22	10	5	1	16 (Note: Four appearances and one goal in UEFA Champions League, two appearances in UEFA Europa League and four appearances and one goal in UEFA Conference League)	2	1 (Note: Appearance in Armenian Supercup)	1	44	14
Noah	2026–27	Armenian Premier League	9	7	0	0	4	2	0	0	13	9
Noah	Total		54	26	10	3	34	6	1	1	99	36
Career total			321	52	30	6	43	6	1	1	385	65

== Honours ==
Noah

- Armenian Premier League: 2024–25
- Armenian Cup: 2024–25, 2025–26
- Armenian Supercup: 2025
