= Donald Molls =

Cameroonian footballer

Personal information
- Full name: Donald Molls Ntchamda Ntchamda
- Date of birth: 14 July 1998 (age 28)
- Place of birth: Yaoundé, Cameroon
- Height: 1.78 m (5 ft 10 in)
- Position: Midfielder

Team information
- Current team: Östersund
- Number: 15

Youth career
- 2016–2017: Lokomotiva Zagreb

Senior career*
Years	Team	Apps	(Gls)
2017–2019	Lokomotiva Zagreb	0	(0)
2018–2019	→ Kustošija (loan)	18	(0)
2019–2021	Kustošija	31	(0)
2021–2022	Borac Banja Luka	35	(0)
2022	Najran	11	(0)
2023	Kolubara	10	(0)
2023–2024	Mladost Lučani	8	(0)
2024–2025	Sloboda Novi Grad	7	(0)
2025	Sloga Meridian	3	(0)
2025	Rudar Prijedor	12	(0)
2026–	Östersund	21	(0)
- * Club domestic league appearances and goals as of 11 November 2026

Donald Molls Ntchamda Ntchamda (born 14 July 1998) is a Cameroonian professional footballer who plays as a midfielder for Swedish Superettan club Östersund.

== Club career ==
=== Borac Banja Luka ===
In February 2021, Molls signed for Bosnian club Borac Banja Luka. In July 2022, Molls left the club.

=== Najran ===
On 25 July 2022, Molls signed for Najran.

=== Kolubara ===
In January 2023, Molls signed for Serbian club Kolubara.

== Career statistics ==
As of match played 22 May 2022

Appearances and goals by club, season and competition
Club	Season	League			Cup		Europe		Other		Total	
Club	Season	League	Apps	Goals	Apps	Goals	Apps	Goals	Apps	Goals	Apps	Goals
Kustošija (loan)	2018–19	Druga HNL	18	0	0	0	–		–		18	0
Kustošija	2019–20	Druga HNL	17	0	0	0	–		–		17	0
Kustošija	2020–21	Druga HNL	14	0	0	0	–		–		14	0
Kustošija	Total		49	0	0	0	–		–		49	0
Borac Banja Luka	2020–21	Bosnian Premier League	10	0	3	0	0	0	–		13	0
Borac Banja Luka	2021–22	Bosnian Premier League	25	0	4	0	3	0	–		32	0
Borac Banja Luka	Total		35	0	7	0	3	0	–		45	0
Kolubara	2022–23	Serbian SuperLiga	0	0	0	0	–		–		0	0
Career total			84	0	7	0	3	0	–		94	0
