= Valentin Costache =

Romanian footballer (born 1998)

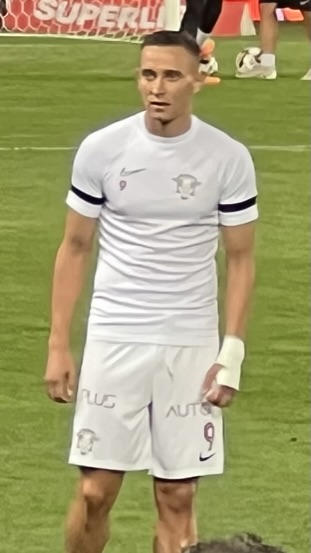
- Costache with Rapid București in 2022

Personal information
- Full name: Valentin Ionuț Costache
- Date of birth: 2 August 1998 (age 28)
- Place of birth: Videle, Romania
- Height: 1.75 m (5 ft 9 in)
- Positions: Winger; attacking midfielder

Team information
- Current team: Noah
- Number: 20

Youth career
- –2014: CSȘ Videle
- 2014–2015: Dinamo București

Senior career*
Years	Team	Apps	(Gls)
2015–2017	Dinamo București	18	(4)
2016–2017	→ Afumați (loan)	22	(6)
2018–2022	CFR Cluj	121	(12)
2022–2023	Rapid București	27	(0)
2023–2024	Apollon Limassol	28	(3)
2024–2026	UTA Arad	65	(15)
2026–	Noah	13	(2)

International career
2014–2015	Romania U17	2	(0)
2017–2021	Romania U21	8	(3)
2021	Romania Olympic	2	(0)
- * Club domestic league appearances and goals as of 11 October 2026

Valentin Ionuț Costache (Romanian pronunciation: [valenˈtin joˈnuts kosˈtake]; born 2 August 1998) is a Romanian professional footballer who plays as a winger or as an attacking midfielder for Armenian Premier League club Noah.

== Club career ==
=== Dinamo București ===
Costache joined the youth setup of Dinamo București from hometown club CSȘ Videle in 2014. On 20 December the following year, he made his senior debut by coming on as a 62nd-minute substitute for Bogdan Gavrilă in a 1–1 Liga I draw against CFR Cluj. On 14 February 2016, he netted the only goal of a match against Botoșani in the same competition.

Costache was loaned out to second division side Afumați for the 2016–17 campaign, where he managed to score six goals from 23 games all competitions comprised. On 30 July 2017, he scored his first Dinamo goal upon his return to Bucharest in a 1–0 away victory over Liga I defending champions Viitorul Constanța.

=== CFR Cluj ===
During early November 2017, it was reported that Costache would be joining CFR Cluj in the approaching transfer window for a fee of €1 million. He was formally unveiled at his new team on 8 January 2018.

Over the course of four and a half seasons in Cluj-Napoca, Costache amassed totals of 145 games and 15 goals in all competitions, and also aided to seven domestic honours.

=== Rapid București ===
On 16 June 2022, Costache was transferred to fellow Liga I team Rapid București.

=== Apollon Limassol ===
On 22 August 2023, Costache signed for Cypriot First Division club Apollon Limassol on a two-year deal with the option for a further year.

== Career statistics ==
As of match played 11 October 2026

Appearances and goals by club, season and competition
Club	Season	League			National cup (Note: Includes Cupa României, Cypriot Cup)		League cup (Note: Includes Cupa Ligii)		Continental		Other		Total	
Club	Season	Division	Apps	Goals	Apps	Goals	Apps	Goals	Apps	Goals	Apps	Goals	Apps	Goals
Dinamo București	2015–16	Liga I	4	1	0	0	1	0	—		—		5	1
Dinamo București	2017–18	Liga I	14	3	1	0	—		1 (Note: Appearance in UEFA Europa League)	0	—		16	3
Dinamo București	Total		18	4	1	0	1	0	1	0	—		21	4
Afumați (loan)	2016–17	Liga II	22	6	1	0	—		—		—		23	6
CFR Cluj	2017–18	Liga I	13	0	0	0	—		—		—		13	0
CFR Cluj	2018–19	Liga I	18	1	3	3	—		1	0	1 (Note: Appearance in Supercupa României)	0	23	4
CFR Cluj	2019–20	Liga I	34	4	0	0	—		1 (Note: Appearance in UEFA Champions League)	0	1	0	36	4
CFR Cluj	2020–21	Liga I	35	4	1	0	—		0	0	1	0	37	4
CFR Cluj	2021–22	Liga I	21	3	0	0	—		14 (Note: Six appearances in UEFA Champions League, two appearances in UEFA Europa League, six appearances in UEFA Europa Conference League)	0	1	0	36	3
CFR Cluj	Total		121	12	4	3	—		16	0	4	0	145	15
Rapid București	2022–23	Liga I	24	0	1	0	—		—		—		25	0
Rapid București	2023–24	Liga I	3	0	—		—		—		—		3	0
Rapid București	Total		27	0	1	0	—		—		—		28	0
Apollon Limassol	2023–24	Cypriot First Division	28	3	2	0	—		—		—		30	3
UTA Arad	2024–25	Liga I	38	6	3	0	—		—		—		41	6
UTA Arad	2025–26	Liga I	27	9	4	2	—		—		—		31	11
UTA Arad	Total		65	15	7	2	—		—		—		72	17
Noah	2025–26	Armenian Premier League	5	1	3	1	—		—		1 (Note: Appearance in Armenian Supercup)	0	9	2
Noah	2026–27	Armenian Premier League	8	1	0	0	—		4 (Note: Appearance in UEFA Conference League)	1	0	0	12	2
Noah	Total		13	2	3	1	—		4	1	1	0	21	4
Career total			294	42	19	6	1	0	21	1	5	0	339	49

== Honours ==
Dinamo București

- Cupa României runner-up: 2015–16

CFR Cluj

- Liga I: 2017–18, 2018–19, 2019–20, 2020–21, 2021–22
- Supercupa României: 2018, 2020; runner-up: 2019, 2021

Noah

- Armenian Cup: 2025–26
- Armenian Supercup: 2025
