= Dani Figueira =

Portuguese footballer (born 1998)

Personal information
- Full name: Daniel Alexis Leite Figueira
- Date of birth: 20 July 1998 (age 28)
- Place of birth: Vizela, Portugal
- Height: 1.89 m (6 ft 2 in)
- Position: Goalkeeper

Team information
- Current team: Noah
- Number: 99

Youth career
- 2006–2009: Santa Eulália
- 2009–2011: Vitória Guimarães
- 2011–2012: Sandinenses
- 2012–2017: Vitória Guimarães

Senior career*
Years	Team	Apps	(Gls)
2017–2019	Vitória Guimarães B	30	(0)
2019–2025	Estoril	118	(0)
2024–2025	→ Leixões (loan)	25	(0)
2025–2026	Gil Vicente	10	(0)
2026–	Noah	8	(0)

International career
2016–2017	Portugal U19	2	(0)
2017	Portugal U20	1	(0)
Medal record
Men's football
Representing Portugal
UEFA European Under-19 Championship
Runner-up	2017 Georgia
- * Club domestic league appearances and goals as of 01:05, 12 November 2026 (UTC)

Daniel "Dani" Alexis Leite Figueira (born 20 July 1998) is a Portuguese professional footballer who plays as a goalkeeper for Armenian Premier League club Noah.

== Club career ==
=== Vitória Guimarães ===
Born in Vizela, Braga District, Figueira finished his development at Guimarães-based Vitória S.C. after joining the club's academy at the age of 11. He made his LigaPro debut with the reserves on 17 March 2018, in a 1–1 away draw against F.C. Famalicão.

=== Estoril ===
Figueira signed a two-year contract with G.D. Estoril Praia also of the second division on 24 June 2019. He played 27 matches in the 2020–21 season, helping his team return to the Primeira Liga as champions and being voted the competition's best player in his position in the process.

On 8 August 2021, Figueira appeared in his first game in the Portuguese top flight, a 2–0 away win over F.C. Arouca. First-choice initially, he was overtaken by Brazilian Marcelo Carné in the 2023–24 campaign.

On 31 August 2024, Figueira was loaned to second-tier side Leixões S.C. until June 2025.

=== Gil Vicente ===
Figueira returned to the main division in 2025–26, on a two-year deal at Gil Vicente F.C. on 7 July 2025. He made his debut on 4 October, replacing field player Murilo Costa after Andrew was sent off at the hour mark of an eventual 2–0 home victory against C.F. Estrela da Amadora.

=== Noah ===
On 25 June 2026, Figueira signed a contract with FC Noah in the Armenian Premier League.

== Career statistics ==
As of match played 13 August 2026

Appearances and goals by club, season and competition
Club	Season	League			National cup		League cup		Continental		Other		Total	
Club	Season	Division	Apps	Goals	Apps	Goals	Apps	Goals	Apps	Goals	Apps	Goals	Apps	Goals
Vitória Guimarães B	2017–18	LigaPro	2	0	—		—		—		—		2	0
Vitória Guimarães B	2018–19	LigaPro	28	0	—		—		—		—		28	0
Vitória Guimarães B	Total		30	0	—		—		—		—		30	0
Estoril	2019–20	LigaPro	22	0	0	0	0	0	—		—		22	0
Estoril	2020–21	Liga Portugal 2	27	0	0	0	0	0	—		—		27	0
Estoril	2021–22	Primeira Liga	24	0	1	0	0	0	—		—		25	0
Estoril	2022–23	Primeira Liga	32	0	1	0	1	0	—		—		34	0
Estoril	2023–24	Primeira Liga	12	0	3	0	5	0	—		—		20	0
Estoril	2024–25	Primeira Liga	1	0	—		—		—		—		1	0
Estoril	Total		118	0	3	0	6	0	—		—		127	0
Leixões (loan)	2024–25	Liga Portugal 2	25	0	0	0	—		—		—		25	0
Gil Vicente	2025–26	Primeira Liga	10	0	1	0	—		—		—		11	0
Noah	2026–27	Armenian Premier League	2	0	0	0	—		4 (Note: Appearances in UEFA Conference League)	0	—		6	0
Career total			185	0	4	0	6	0	4	0	0	0	199	0

== Honours ==
Estoril

- Liga Portugal 2: 2020–21
