= Stone Mambo =

Congolese footballer (born 1999)

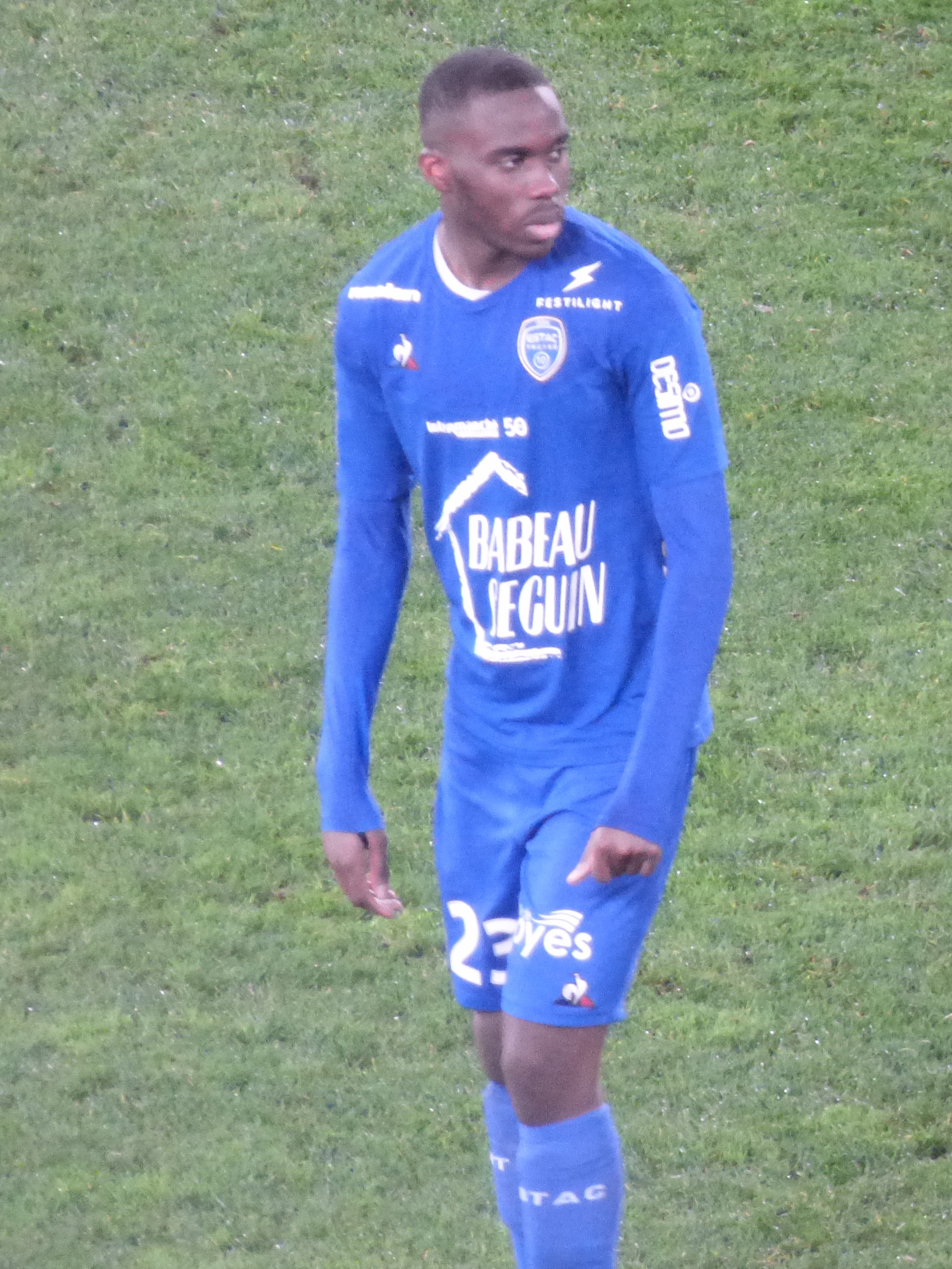
- Mambo in 2020

Personal information
- Full name: Stone Muzalimoja Mambo
- Date of birth: 25 March 1999 (age 27)
- Place of birth: Kinshasa, DR Congo
- Height: 1.83 m (6 ft 0 in)
- Position: Midfielder

Team information
- Current team: Noah
- Number: 4

Youth career
- 2013–2019: Troyes

Senior career*
Years	Team	Apps	(Gls)
2017–2019	Troyes II	36	(2)
2019–2021	Troyes	23	(0)
2021–2023	Orléans	56	(2)
2021	Orléans II	2	(0)
2023–2025	Rodez	35	(0)
2025–2026	Grenoble	18	(1)
2026–	Noah	0	(0)
- * Club domestic league appearances and goals as of 12 May 2026

Stone Muzalimoja Mambo (born 25 March 1999) is a Congolese professional footballer who plays as midfielder for Armenian Premier League club Noah.

== Career ==
Born in Kinshasa, DR Congo, Mambo joined Troyes youth academy in 2013, and signed his first professional contract on 24 June 2019. He made his professional debut with Troyes in a 2–1 Coupe de la Ligue loss to Lens on 13 August 2019.

On 20 July 2021, Mambo signed for Orléans.

On 21 August 2023, Mambo moved to Rodez on a two-year contract.
