= Marios Sofianos =

Greek footballer

Personal information
- Date of birth: 24 November 2003 (age 22)
- Place of birth: Serres, Greece
- Height: 1.75 m (5 ft 9 in)
- Position: Winger

Team information
- Current team: Panserraikos
- Number: 21

Youth career
- 2018–2020: Panserraikos

Senior career*
Years	Team	Apps	(Gls)
2020–	Panserraikos	73	(3)
2020–2021	→ Apollon Paralimnio (loan)	8	(1)

International career^{‡}
2023–2024	Greece U21	3	(0)
- * Club domestic league appearances and goals as of 14 June 2026 ‡ National team caps and goals as of 26 March 2024

Marios Sofianos (Greek: Μάριος Σοφιανός; born 24 November 2003) is a Greek professional footballer who plays as a winger for Super League club Panserraikos.
