= Michael Pavlović =

Slovenian footballer (born 2001)

Personal information
- Date of birth: 12 June 2001 (age 25)
- Place of birth: Novo Mesto, Slovenia
- Height: 1.79 m (5 ft 10 in)
- Position: Left-back

Team information
- Current team: Noah
- Number: 21

Youth career
- –2018: Krka
- 2018–2019: Olimpija Ljubljana

Senior career*
Years	Team	Apps	(Gls)
2020–2022	Olimpija Ljubljana	56	(1)
2022–2024	Koper	29	(0)
2024–2026	Botoșani	49	(1)
2026–	Noah	2	(0)

International career
2018–2019	Slovenia U18	4	(0)
2019–2020	Slovenia U19	5	(0)
2021	Slovenia U21	4	(0)
- * Club domestic league appearances and goals as of 10 August 2026

Michael Pavlović (born 12 June 2001) is a Slovenian professional footballer who plays as a left-back for Armenian Premier League club Noah.

== Career statistics ==
As of 27 February 2026

Appearances and goals by club, season and competition
Club	Season	League			National cup (Note: Includes Slovenian Cup, Cupa României)		Continental		Total	
Club	Season	Division	Apps	Goals	Apps	Goals	Apps	Goals	Apps	Goals
Olimpija Ljubljana	2019–20	Slovenian PrvaLiga	9	0	0	0	0	0	9	0
Olimpija Ljubljana	2020–21	Slovenian PrvaLiga	26	1	3	0	2 (Note: Appearances in UEFA Europa League)	0	31	1
Olimpija Ljubljana	2021–22	Slovenian PrvaLiga	21	0	1	0	4 (Note: Appearances in UEFA Europa Conference League)	0	26	0
Olimpija Ljubljana	Total		56	1	4	0	6	0	66	1
Koper	2022–23	Slovenian PrvaLiga	11	0	2	0	0	0	13	0
Koper	2023–24	Slovenian PrvaLiga	18	0	1	0	—		19	0
Koper	Total		29	0	3	0	0	0	32	0
Botoșani	2024–25	Liga I	30	1	2	0	—		32	1
Botoșani	2025–26	Liga I	19	0	3	0	—		22	0
Botoșani	Total		49	1	5	0	—		54	1
Noah	2026–27	Armenian Premier League	0	0	0	0	0	0	0	0
Career total			134	2	12	0	6	0	152	2

== Honours ==
Olimpija Ljubljana

- Slovenian Cup: 2020–21
