= Eric Boakye =

Ghanaian footballer

Personal information
- Date of birth: 19 November 1999 (age 26)
- Place of birth: Kumasi, Ghana
- Height: 1.73 m (5 ft 8 in)
- Position: Defender

Team information
- Current team: Noah
- Number: 6

Senior career*
Years	Team	Apps	(Gls)
–2018	Asokwa Deportivo		
2018–2022	Olimpija Ljubljana	94	(2)
2022–2025	Aris Limassol	68	(3)
2025–	Noah	20	(0)
- * Club domestic league appearances and goals as of 18 June 2026

Eric Boakye (born 19 November 1999) is a Ghanaian professional footballer who plays as a defender for Noah.

== Honours ==
Olimpija Ljubljana

- Slovenian Cup: 2018–19, 2020–21

Aris Limassol

- Cypriot First Division: 2022–23
- Cypriot Super Cup: 2023

Noah

- Armenian Cup: 2025–26
- Armenian Supercup: 2025
