= Gor Manvelyan =

Armenian footballer (born 2002)

Personal information
- Date of birth: 9 April 2002 (age 24)
- Place of birth: Khankendi, Azerbaijan
- Height: 1.80 m (5 ft 11 in)
- Positions: Attacking midfielder; forward

Team information
- Current team: FC Noah
- Number: 27

Youth career
- 2008–2009: US Saint-Lô
- 2009–2014: FC Saint-Lô
- 2014–2015: US Granville
- 2015–2021: FC Nantes

Senior career*
Years	Team	Apps	(Gls)
2020–2023	FC Nantes B	32	(4)
2022–2023	FC Nantes	1	(0)
2023–	FC Noah	67	(10)

International career^{‡}
2023–2024	Armenia U21	4	(0)
2024–	Armenia	14	(1)
- * Club domestic league appearances and goals as of 18 June 2026 ‡ National team caps and goals as of 12 November 2026

Gor Manvelyan (Armenian: Գոռ Մանվելյան; born 9 April 2002) is an Armenian professional footballer who plays for FC Noah and the Armenia national team.

== Early life ==
Gor Manvelyan was born in Stepanakert, Republic of Artsakh. Having arrived in France at an early age, Manvelyan grew up in Pont-Hébert, La Manche, first playing football with FC Saint-Lô, before moving to the US Granville as an under-13.

== Club career ==
Manvelyan joined the FC Nantes academy in 2015. During the 2018–19 season, he won the national U17 championship, scoring 5 goals and 6 assists with a team comprising the likes of Jean-Claude Ntenda, Lohann Doucet, Mohamed Achi, Jean-Baptiste Gorby and Quentin Merlin.

The following season, with Stéphane Ziani under-19s, he was the top scorer of the Championnat National and the team, with 22 goals in total, despite the season ending prematurely with the COVID pandemic. He was also a standout in the 2019–20 Coupe Gambardella, as Nantes reached the quarter finals of the national youth cup, before the competition was eventually also canceled. Having scored a goal in the opening round against Lorient, he recorded two braces for the last two matches against Évreux and Niort.

In 2020–21, he started playing with the reserve team in National 2, before making his first appearances in the professional squad. He signed his first professional contract in April 2021. He made his professional debut with Antoine Kombouaré's first team on the 2 January 2022. He replaced Willem Geubbels during a 2–0 Coupe de France win against AS Vitré. He was therefore part of the team that won the competition, Nantes' first trophy in 22 years, and their 4th Coupe de France title. Whilst regularly included in the first team match day squads, Manvelyan mainly kept on showing his talents with the reserve team. In September 2023, he left Nantes and signed for Armenian football club Noah.

== International career ==
On 22 May 2024, he received his first call-up to the Armenian senior national team for a friendly matches against Slovenia and Kazakhstan.

Manvelyan made his debut for the Armenia national team on 10 September 2024 in a Nations League game against North Macedonia at the Toše Proeski Arena. He substituted André Calisir in the 86th minute, as North Macedonia went on to win 2–0. Manvelyan scored his first international goal on 10 October 2024 in extra time to salvage a 2–2 draw against the Faroe Islands.

== Style of play ==
Coming though the FC Nantes academy as a versatile midfielder, he rose to prominence as an offensively minded player, mostly as a false nine, regularly scoring goals.

== Career statistics ==
=== International ===
As of 12 November 2026

Armenia
Year	Apps	Goals
2024	5	1
2025	2	0
2026	7	0
Total	14	1

== International goals ==
No.	Date	Venue	Opponent	Score	Result	Competition
1.	10 October 2024	Tórsvøllur, Tórshavn, Faroe Islands	Faroe Islands	2–2	2–2	2024–25 UEFA Nations League

== Honours ==
Noah

- Armenian Premier League: 2024–25
- Armenian Cup: 2024–25, 2025–26
- Armenian Supercup: 2025

Nantes

- Championnat National U17: 2018–19
- Coupe de France: 2021–22
