= Marko Lazetić =

Serbian footballer (born 2004)

Marko Lazetić Марко Лазетић
Personal information
- Date of birth: 22 January 2004 (age 22)
- Place of birth: Belgrade, Serbia and Montenegro
- Height: 1.92 m (6 ft 4 in)
- Position: Forward

Team information
- Current team: Noah
- Number: 8

Youth career
- Red Star Belgrade
- 2022–2023: AC Milan

Senior career*
Years	Team	Apps	(Gls)
2020–2022	Red Star Belgrade	15	(1)
2021	→ Grafičar Beograd (loan)	14	(4)
2022–2025	AC Milan	1	(0)
2023	→ Rheindorf Altach (loan)	10	(0)
2023–2024	→ Fortuna Sittard (loan)	8	(0)
2024–2025	→ TSC (loan)	32	(2)
2025–2026	Aberdeen	27	(4)
2026–	Noah	13	(10)

International career^{‡}
2021–2023	Serbia U19	20	(9)
2023–	Serbia U21	10	(0)
- * Club domestic league appearances and goals as of 8 November 2026 ‡ National team caps and goals as of 19:45, 1 April 2024 (UTC)

Marko Lazetić (Serbian Cyrillic: Марко Лазетић; born 22 January 2004) is a Serbian professional footballer who plays as a forward for Armenian Premier League club Noah.

== Club career ==
=== Red Star Belgrade ===
On 29 November 2020, at the age of 16 years and 10 months, Lazetić made his debut for Red Star Belgrade as an 76th-minute substitute for Richmond Boakye against Rad. The home match finished as a 3–0 win for Red Star.

=== AC Milan ===
On 27 January 2022, five days after his 18th birthday, Lazetić joined Serie A club AC Milan for a fee believed to be in the region of €4 million, signing a deal until June 2026. He was assigned shirt number 22 and enlisted as a first team player. He debuted for the first team on 19 April, in a Coppa Italia match against cross-city rivals Inter Milan, coming on as a substitute in the 86th minute.

On 22 May 2022, as Milan won the scudetto on the last matchday of the Serie A season, he was awarded a winner's medal despite making no league appearances.. On 8 November 2022, Lazetić made his Serie A debut in a 0–0 away draw against Cremonese.

==== Loan to Rheindorf Altach ====
On 3 February 2023, Lazetić moved to Austrian Bundesliga club Rheindorf Altach on a six-month loan.

==== Loan to Fortuna Sittard ====
On 24 August 2023, Lazetić joined Eredivisie club Fortuna Sittard on a season-long loan.

==== Loan to TSC ====
On 18 June 2024, he moved back to his native Serbia, and joined Serbian SuperLiga club TSC on a season-long loan.

=== Aberdeen ===
On 18 August 2025, Lazetić moved to Scotland, and signed a four-year contract with Scottish Premiership club Aberdeen.

=== Noah ===
On July 13, 2026, Lazetić joined Armenian Premier League club FC Noah for an undisclosed fee.

== Personal life ==
Lazetić is the nephew of former footballers Nikola Lazetić and Žarko Lazetić.

== Career statistics ==
As of match played 25 May 2025

Appearances and goals by club, season and competition
Club	Season	League			National cup (Note: Includes Serbian Cup, Coppa Italia)		Continental (Note: Includes UEFA Europa League)		Other		Total	
Club	Season	Division	Apps	Goals	Apps	Goals	Apps	Goals	Apps	Goals	Apps	Goals
Red Star Belgrade	2020–21	Serbian SuperLiga	1	0	0	0	0	0	0	0	1	0
Red Star Belgrade	2021–22	Serbian SuperLiga	14	1	0	0	2	0	0	0	16	1
Red Star Belgrade	Total		15	1	0	0	2	0	0	0	17	1
Grafičar Beograd (loan)	2020–21	Serbian First League	14	4	0	0	—		0	0	14	4
AC Milan	2021–22	Serie A	0	0	1	0	0	0	0	0	1	0
AC Milan	2022–23	Serie A	1	0	0	0	0	0	0	0	1	0
AC Milan	Total		1	0	1	0	0	0	0	0	2	0
Rheindorf Altach (loan)	2022–23	Austrian Bundesliga	10	0	0	0	0	0	0	0	10	0
Fortuna Sittard (loan)	2023–24	Eredivisie	8	0	1	0	0	0	0	0	9	0
TSC (loan)	2024–25	Serbian SuperLiga	32	2	4	0	7	1	0	0	43	3
Career total			80	7	6	0	9	1	0	0	95	8

== Honours ==
Red Star Belgrade

- Serbian SuperLiga: 2021–22

AC Milan

- Serie A: 2021–22
