= Brian Oddei =

Ghanaian-Italian football player (born 2002)

Personal information
- Full name: Brian Safo Oddei
- Date of birth: 18 September 2002 (age 24)
- Place of birth: Accra, Ghana
- Height: 1.75 m (5 ft 9 in)
- Position: Right winger

Team information
- Current team: Koper
- Number: 30

Youth career
- Sassuolo

Senior career*
Years	Team	Apps	(Gls)
2019–2023	Sassuolo	7	(0)
2021–2022	→ Crotone (loan)	11	(0)
2023	→ Rudeš (loan)	11	(0)
2023	Rudeš	8	(0)
2024	Dunajská Streda	6	(0)
2025	KTP	3	(0)
2025–	Koper	7	(0)
- * Club domestic league appearances and goals as of 5 December 2025

Brian Safo Oddei (born 18 September 2002) is a Ghanaian-Italian professional footballer who plays as a right winger for Slovenian club Koper.

== Club career ==
Oddei was raised in the youth teams of Sassuolo. He was first called up to the senior squad in December 2019 for Serie A and Coppa Italia games, but remained on the bench on that occasion. He was moved from the Under-19 squad to the senior squad on a permanent basis in November 2020.

He made his Serie A debut for Sassuolo on 10 January 2021 in a 3–1 away loss against Juventus. He substituted Mert Müldür in the 73rd minute.

On 31 August 2021, Oddei joined Serie B club Crotone on loan. On 31 January 2022, the loan was terminated early and he returned to Sassuolo.

On 15 February 2023, Oddei was loaned to Rudeš in Croatia.

== Personal life ==
Born in Accra, he went to Italy when he was 11 years old.
