= 2022–23 CFR Cluj season =

CFR Cluj
2022–23 season
- Owner: Ioan Varga
- Chairman: Cristian Balaj
- Manager: Dan Petrescu
- Stadium: Stadionul Dr. Constantin Rădulescu
- Liga I: 3rd
- Cupa României: Semi-finals
- Supercupa României: Runners-up
- UEFA Champions League: First qualifying round
- UEFA Europa Conference League: Knockout round play-offs
- Top goalscorer: League: Rangelo Janga (11); All: Rangelo Janga (12)
Home colours	Away colours	Third colours
- All statistics correct as of 23 May 2023.

The 2022–23 CFR Cluj season was the club's 115th season in existence and the 19th consecutive season in the top flight of Romanian football. In addition to the domestic league, CFR Cluj participated in this season's edition of the Cupa României, the Supercupa României, the UEFA Champions League and the UEFA Europa Conference League. The season covers the period from 1 July 2022 to 30 June 2023.

== Players ==
=== First-team squad ===
As of 20 October 2022

Note: Flags indicate national team as defined under FIFA eligibility rules; some limited exceptions apply. Players may hold more than one non-FIFA nationality.

No.	Pos.	Nation	Player
1	GK	ITA	Simone Scuffet
2	DF	CRO	Karlo Bručić
3	DF	ROU	Andrei Burcă (3rd captain)
4	DF	ROU	Cristian Manea
6	DF	CMR	Jean-Claude Billong
7	FW	POR	Zé Gomes
8	MF	BRA	Roger
9	FW	SUI	Cephas Malele (on loan from Al-Tai)
10	MF	ROU	Ciprian Deac (Vice-captain)
11	MF	ROU	Claudiu Petrila
12	GK	ROU	Mihai Pânzariu
15	FW	GHA	Emmanuel Yeboah
20	MF	DEN	Vito Hammershøy-Mistrati
21	MF	GHA	Nana Boateng
22	FW	CRO	Gabriel Debeljuh
23	GK	ROU	Rareș Gal
24	DF	ROU	Rareș Bălan

No.	Pos.	Nation	Player
28	MF	ROU	Ovidiu Hoban (4th captain)
30	FW	ROU	Daniel Bîrligea
32	FW	CUW	Rangelo Janga
33	DF	CRO	Denis Kolinger (on loan from Vejle)
34	GK	ROU	Cristian Bălgrădean
37	MF	ROU	Mihai Bordeianu
40	MF	CRO	Lovro Cvek
44	DF	BRA	Yuri Matias
45	DF	ROU	Mário Camora (Captain)
47	DF	GER	Christopher Braun
73	MF	CRO	Karlo Muhar
75	MF	ROU	Adrian Gîdea
76	MF	ROU	Tudor Lucaci
90	GK	ROU	Răzvan Sava
92	DF	SEN	Ibrahima Mbaye
94	MF	ROU	Cătălin Itu
99	FW	ROU	Sergiu Buș

=== Other players under contract ===
Note: Flags indicate national team as defined under FIFA eligibility rules; some limited exceptions apply. Players may hold more than one non-FIFA nationality.

No.	Pos.	Nation	Player
—	MF	MTN	Guessouma Fofana

=== Out on loan ===
Note: Flags indicate national team as defined under FIFA eligibility rules; some limited exceptions apply. Players may hold more than one non-FIFA nationality.

No.	Pos.	Nation	Player
17	FW	ESP	Jefté Betancor (to Pafos)
82	MF	ROU	Alin Fică (to Politehnica Iași)
86	FW	ROU	Denis Rusu (to CS Unirea Ungheni)
89	GK	ROU	Otto Hindrich (to Kisvárda)
92	MF	ROU	George Leață (to CSM Slatina)
—	DF	CIV	Abdoulaye Niakate (to Minaur Baia Mare)

No.	Pos.	Nation	Player
—	MF	ROU	Adrian Păun (to Hapoel Be'er Sheva)
—	MF	ROU	Sergiu Luca (to Gloria Bistrița)
—	MF	CIV	Ricky Gnéba (to Minaur Baia Mare)
—	FW	CIV	Kevin Bakare (to Minaur Baia Mare)
—	FW	MDA	Gheorghe Gondiu (to CSM Sighetu Marmației)

== Pre-season and friendlies ==
Win Draw Loss Fixtures

18 June 2022 Friendly	Koper	0–2	CFR Cluj	Gornja Radgona, Slovenia
17:30 CEST (UTC+2)		Report	Debeljuh 11'; Dugandžić 54'	Stadium: Stadion Gornja Radgona

21 June 2022 Friendly	Napredak Kruševac	0–3	CFR Cluj	Gornja Radgona, Slovenia
18:00 CEST (UTC+2)		Report	Dugandžić 57' (pen.); Betancor 73'; Cvek 78'	Stadium: Stadion Gornja Radgona

24 June 2022 Friendly	Partizan	0–1	CFR Cluj	Gornja Radgona, Slovenia
17:30 CEST (UTC+2)		Report	Dugandžić 35'	Stadium: Stadion Gornja Radgona

25 June 2022 Friendly	Hajduk Split	0–2	CFR Cluj	Dietersdorf bei Fürstenfeld, Austria
18:00 CEST (UTC+2)	Krolo (yellow card) 69'	Report	Deac 39' (pen.); Manea 42'; Burcă (yellow card) 87'	Stadium: Sportplatz Dietersdorf; Referee: Michael Steindl

11 January 2023 Friendly	Holstein Kiel	1–1	CFR Cluj	Oliva, Spain
15:15 CET (UTC+1)	Mühling 75'		Petrila 67'	Stadium: Oliva Nova Golf & Beach Resort Campo 1

== Competitions ==
=== Overview ===
Competition	First match	Last match	Starting round	Final position	Record							
Competition	First match	Last match	Starting round	Final position	Pld	W	D	L	GF	GA	GD	Win %
Liga I	16 July 2022	May 2023	Matchday 1		26	17	2	7	41	23	+18	65.38
Cupa României	10 November 2022		Group stage		1	0	1	0	1	1	+0	0.00
Supercupa României	9 July 2022		Final		1	0	0	1	1	2	−1	0.00
UEFA Champions League	5 July 2022	13 July 2022	First qualifying round	First qualifying round	2	0	2	0	2	2	+0	0.00
UEFA Europa Conference League	21 July 2022	23 February 2023	Second qualifying round		14	6	5	3	11	7	+4	42.86
Total					44	23	10	11	56	35	+21	52.27

Last updated: 23 February 2023
Source: Soccerway

=== Liga I ===
==== Results summary ====
Overall								Home						Away					
Pld	W	D	L	GF	GA	GD	Pts	W	D	L	GF	GA	GD	W	D	L	GF	GA	GD
15	10	1	4	26	15	+11	31	7	0	2	18	8	+10	3	1	2	8	7	+1

Last updated: 7 November 2022.
Source: Liga 1

==== Results by round ====
Round	1	2	3	4	5	6	7	8	9	10	11	12	13	14	15	16	17	18
Ground	H	A	H	A	H	A	H	H	A	H	A	H	A	H	A	A	H	A
Result	W	L	W	W	L	P	L	W	P	W	W	W	D	W	W	L	W	
Position	5	9	5	1	4	7	10	6	7	5	4	4	3	3	3	3	3	

Updated to match(es) played on 7 November 2022. Source: Liga 1
A = Away; H = Home; W = Win; D = Draw; L = Loss

==== Regular season ====
===== Table =====
Pos	Team	Pld	W	D	L	GF	GA	GD	Pts	Qualification
1	Farul Constanța	30	19	7	4	54	28	+26	64	Qualification for the Play-off round
2	CFR Cluj	30	20	3	7	54	28	+26	63	Qualification for the Play-off round
3	FCSB	30	17	6	7	51	35	+16	57	Qualification for the Play-off round
4	Universitatea Craiova	30	16	6	8	37	27	+10	54	Qualification for the Play-off round
5	Rapid București	30	15	7	8	40	26	+14	52	Qualification for the Play-off round

Source: LPF (in Romanian) Soccerway
Rules for classification: 1) Points; 2) Head-to-head points; 3) Head-to-head goal difference; 4) Head-to-head goals scored; 5) Goal difference; 6) Goals scored; 7) Play-off.

===== Matches =====
The league fixtures were announced on 1 July 2022.

16 July 2022 1	CFR Cluj	1–0	Rapid București	Cluj-Napoca
21:30 EEST (UTC+3)	Matias 17'			Stadium: Stadionul Dr. Constantin Rădulescu; Referee: Sebastian Colțescu

24 July 2022 2	FC U Craiova 1948	3–1	CFR Cluj	Craiova
16:00 EEST (UTC+3)	Van Durmen 32', 72'; Compagno 46'	Report	Deac 14'	Stadium: Stadionul Ion Oblemenco; Referee: Andrei Chivulete

30 July 2022 3	CFR Cluj	4–2	Mioveni	Cluj-Napoca
21:30 EEST (UTC+3)	Debeljuh 34', 38'; Deac 45+2' (pen.); Hoban 72'	Report	Rusu 7', 60'	Stadium: Stadionul Dr. Constantin Rădulescu; Referee: Bogdan Dumitrache

7 August 2022 4	Chindia Târgoviște	0–2	CFR Cluj	Ploiești
18:30 EEST (UTC+3)		Report	Muhar 27'; Yeboah 45+1'	Stadium: Stadionul Ilie Oană; Referee: Iulian Călin

14 August 2022 5	CFR Cluj	0–1	Botoșani	Cluj-Napoca
18:30 EEST (UTC+3)		Report	Camara 31'	Stadium: Stadionul Dr. Constantin Rădulescu; Referee: George Găman

28 August 2022 7	CFR Cluj	1–3	Farul Constanța	Cluj-Napoca
18:30 EEST (UTC+3)	Malele 10' (pen.)	Report	Pitu 34'; Munteanu 63', 87'	Stadium: Stadionul Dr. Constantin Rădulescu; Referee: Radu Petrescu

31 August 2022 8	CFR Cluj	4–0	Voluntari	Cluj-Napoca
19:15 EEST (UTC+3)	Petrila 32'; Betancor 53'; Hammershøy-Mistrati 80'; Yeboah 88'	Report		Stadium: Stadionul Dr. Constantin Rădulescu; Referee: Horia Mladinovici

11 September 2022 10	CFR Cluj	2–0	Universitatea Craiova	Cluj-Napoca
21:30 EEST (UTC+3)	Muhar 17'; Găman 27' (o.g.)	Report		Stadium: Stadionul Dr. Constantin Rădulescu; Referee: Andrei Chivulete

19 September 2022 11	Argeș Pitești	0–1	CFR Cluj	Pitești
20:30 EEST (UTC+3)		Report	Camora 62'	Stadium: Stadionul Nicolae Dobrin; Referee: Marcel Bîrsan

1 October 2022 12	CFR Cluj	1–0	Petrolul Ploiești	Cluj-Napoca
21:30 EEST (UTC+3)	Manea 90+1'	Report		Stadium: Stadionul Dr. Constantin Rădulescu; Referee: Cătălin Popa

10 October 2022 13	UTA Arad	1–1	CFR Cluj	Arad
20:30 EEST (UTC+3)	Benga 59'	Report	Boateng 32'	Stadium: Stadionul Francisc von Neuman; Referee: Ionuţ Coza

17 October 2022 14	CFR Cluj	2–1	Sepsi OSK	Cluj-Napoca
21:00 EEST (UTC+3)	Matias 33'; Muhar 84'	Report	Ciobotariu 27'	Stadium: Stadionul Dr. Constantin Rădulescu; Referee: István Kovács

23 October 2022 15	Universitatea Cluj	1–2	CFR Cluj	Cluj-Napoca
21:00 EEST (UTC+3)	Ilie (yellow card) 23'; Simion (yellow card) 58'; Vlădoiu (yellow card) 58'; Pires 90+3' (pen.)	Report	Deac 25' (pen.); Boateng (yellow card) 54'; Malele 61' (pen.); Yeboah (yellow card) 70'; Petrila (yellow card) 83'; Kolinger (yellow card) 90+2'; Hoban (yellow card) 90+5'	Stadium: Cluj Arena; Referee: Radu Petrescu

30 October 2022 16	Rapid București	2–1	CFR Cluj	Bucharest
21:00 EET (UTC+2)	Săpunaru 36' (pen.); Dugandžić 71' (pen.)	Report	Muhar 54'	Stadium: Superbet Arena-Giulești; Referee: Cătălin Popa

7 November 2022 17	CFR Cluj	3–1	FC U Craiova 1948	Cluj-Napoca
21:00 EET (UTC+2)	Janga 16'; Manea 33'; Yeboah 67'	Report	Ganea 61'	Stadium: Stadionul Dr. Constantin Rădulescu; Referee: Florin Andrei

13 November 2022 18	Mioveni	0–1	CFR Cluj	Mioveni
18:00 EET (UTC+2)		Report	Malele 87'	Stadium: Stadionul Orășenesc; Referee: Horia Mladinovici

30 November 2022 6	Hermannstadt	2–3	CFR Cluj	Mediaș
19:00 EET (UTC+2)	Paraschiv 35'; Oroian 56'	Report	Janga 10', 26'; Malele 73'	Stadium: Stadionul Municipal Gaz Metan; Referee: Andrei Moroiță

4 December 2022 19	CFR Cluj	2–0	Chindia Târgoviște	Cluj-Napoca
15:30 EET (UTC+2)	Kolinger 17'; Manea 80' (pen.)	Report		Stadium: Stadionul Dr. Constantin Rădulescu; Referee: Marian Barbu

11 December 2022 20	Botoșani	1–1	CFR Cluj	Botoșani
17:30 EET (UTC+2)	Dragu 90+1'	Report	Cvek 28'	Stadium: Stadionul Municipal; Referee: Szabolcs Kovacs

15 December 2022 9	FCSB	0–1	CFR Cluj	Bucharest
20:00 EET (UTC+2)		Report	Janga 69'	Stadium: Arena Națională; Referee: István Kovács

20 December 2022 21	CFR Cluj	0–1	Hermannstadt	Cluj-Napoca
20:00 EET (UTC+2)		Report	Bejan 90+5'	Stadium: Stadionul Dr. Constantin Rădulescu; Referee: Andrei Chivulete

23 January 2023 22	Farul Constanța	0–3	CFR Cluj	Ovidiu
20:00 EET (UTC+2)		Report	Krasniqi 49'; Manea 59' (pen.); Petrila 77'	Stadium: Central Stadium; Referee: István Kovács

30 January 2023 23	Voluntari	0–1	CFR Cluj	Voluntari
20:00 EET (UTC+2)		Report	Paz 69' (o.g.)	Stadium: Stadionul Anghel Iordănescu; Referee: Adrian Cojocaru

5 February 2023 24	CFR Cluj	0–1	FCSB	Cluj-Napoca
21:00 EET (UTC+2)		Report	Edjouma 88'	Stadium: Stadionul Dr. Constantin Rădulescu; Referee: Sebastian Colțescu

11 February 2023 25	Universitatea Craiova	2–0	CFR Cluj	Craiova
20:00 EET (UTC+2)	Ivan 67', 86'	Report	Manea (yellow card) 66'	Stadium: Stadionul Ion Oblemenco; Referee: Marcel Bîrsan

19 February 2023 26	CFR Cluj	3–1	Argeș Pitești	Cluj-Napoca
17:00 EET (UTC+2)	Deac 2'; Janga 25'; Krasniqi 90+4'	Report	Kolinger 61' (o.g.)	Stadium: Stadionul Dr. Constantin Rădulescu; Referee: Viorel Flueran

27 February 2023 27	Petrolul Ploiești	2–5	CFR Cluj	Ploiești
20:00 EET (UTC+2)	Bratu 77'; Purtić 83'	Report	Deac 11'; Bîrligea 49'; Boateng (yellow card) 63', (goal) 80'; Janga 66'; Maglica 73'	Stadium: Stadionul Ilie Oană; Referee: George Găman

2 March 2023 28	CFR Cluj	2–1	UTA Arad	Cluj-Napoca
17:00 EET (UTC+2)	Krasniqi 15'; Matias 62'	Report	Pop 47'	Stadium: Stadionul Dr. Constantin Rădulescu; Referee: Lucian Rusandu

6 March 2023 29	Sepsi OSK	2–2	CFR Cluj	Sfântu Gheorghe
20:30 EET (UTC+2)	Tamás 10'; Šafranko 73'	Report	Matias 31'; Janga 36'	Stadium: Sepsi Arena Stadium; Referee: Sebastian Colțescu

13 March 2023 30	CFR Cluj	4–0	Universitatea Cluj	Cluj-Napoca
20:30 EET (UTC+2)	Janga 25' (pen.); Krasniqi 32', (penalty missed) 81'; Manea 42' (pen.); Bîrligea 90+4'	Report	Martić (yellow card) 45'; Goranov (yellow card) 90+2'; Ispas (yellow card) 90+6'	Stadium: Stadionul Dr. Constantin Rădulescu; Referee: Marcel Bîrsan

==== Play-off round ====
===== Table =====
Pos	Team	Pld	W	D	L	GF	GA	GD	Pts	Qualification	FAR	FCS	CFR	CRA	RAP	SPS
1	Farul Constanța (C)	10	6	3	1	22	13	+9	53	Qualification to Champions League first qualifying round		3–2	1–0	3–2	7–2	2–1
2	FCSB	10	5	2	3	15	15	0	46	Qualification to Europa Conference League second qualifying round	2–1		1–0	1–1	1–5	3–1
3	CFR Cluj (O)	10	2	4	4	11	14	−3	42	Qualification to European competition play-offs	1–2	1–1		1–1	2–2	2–1
4	Universitatea Craiova	10	3	4	3	15	14	+1	40		1–1	1–2	1–1		3–1	0–1
5	Rapid București	10	3	3	4	17	20	−3	38		1–1	1–0	3–1	2–3		0–0
6	Sepsi OSK (Note: Cup winner)	10	2	2	6	10	14	−4	29	Qualification to Europa Conference League second qualifying round	1–1	1–2	1–2	1–2	2–0	

Source: Soccerway, FRF (in Romanian), LPF (in Romanian)
Legend: Blue = home team win; Yellow = draw; Red = away team win.
Rules for classification: 1) Points; 2) Points without rounding; 3) Head-to-head points; 4) Head-to-head goal difference; 5) Head-to-head goals scored; 6) Goal difference; 7) Goals scored; 8) Play-off (only if needed to decide champion or teams for UEFA competitions). (Note: only criteria 6 and 7 are applied to establish the classification during the competition.)
(C) Champions; (O) Play-off winners

===== Matches =====
19 March 2023 1	CFR Cluj	2–2	Rapid București	Cluj-Napoca
19:00 EET (UTC+2)	Janga 4' (pen.); Boateng 23'	Report	Käit 11'; Onea 55'	Stadium: Stadionul Dr. Constantin Rădulescu; Referee: Andrei Chivulete

2 April 2023 2	Universitatea Craiova	1–1	CFR Cluj	Craiova
21:00 EEST (UTC+3)	Koljić 72'	Report	Cvek 69'	Stadium: Stadionul Ion Oblemenco; Referee: István Kovács

9 April 2023 3	CFR Cluj	1–1	FCSB	Cluj-Napoca
21:00 EEST (UTC+3)	Bîrligea 19'	Report	Coman 68'	Stadium: Stadionul Dr. Constantin Rădulescu; Referee: Radu Petrescu

15 April 2023 4	CFR Cluj	2–1	Sepsi OSK	Cluj-Napoca
19:00 EEST (UTC+3)	Bîrligea 44'; Deac 53'	Report	Dumitrescu 28'	Stadium: Stadionul Dr. Constantin Rădulescu; Referee: Iulian Călin

22 April 2023 5	Farul Constanța	1–0	CFR Cluj	Ovidiu
20:30 EEST (UTC+3)	Mazilu 53'	Report		Stadium: Central Stadium; Referee: Sebastian Colțescu

1 May 2023 6	Rapid București	3–1	CFR Cluj	Bucharest
20:30 EEST (UTC+3)	Dugandžić 9' (pen.), 45+2'; Käit 12'	Report	Braun 15'	Stadium: Superbet Arena-Giulești; Referee: Marcel Bîrsan

7 May 2023 7	CFR Cluj	1–1	Universitatea Craiova	Cluj-Napoca
21:00 EEST (UTC+3)	Muhar 66'	Report	Ivan 69'	Stadium: Stadionul Dr. Constantin Rădulescu; Referee: Radu Petrescu

14 May 2023 8	FCSB	1–0	CFR Cluj	Bucharest
21:00 EEST (UTC+3)	Coman 49'	Report		Stadium: Arena Națională; Referee: Sebastian Colțescu

20 May 2023 9	Sepsi OSK	1–2	CFR Cluj	Sfântu Gheorghe
20:30 EEST (UTC+3)	Tudorie 43'	Report	Petrila 33'; Janga 82'	Stadium: Sepsi Arena Stadium; Referee: Adrian Costreie

28 May 2023 10	CFR Cluj	1–2	Farul Constanța	Cluj-Napoca
21:00 EEST (UTC+3)	Bîrligea 15'	Report	Munteanu 42', 62' (pen.)	Stadium: Stadionul Dr. Constantin Rădulescu; Referee: Marcel Bîrsan

=== Cupa României ===
==== Group stage ====
20 October 2022 1	Universitatea Cluj	1–1	CFR Cluj	Cluj-Napoca
21:00 EEST (UTC+3)	Roger 64' (o.g.)		Bîrligea 2'	Stadium: Cluj Arena

10 November 2022 2	Dumbrăvița	0–5	CFR Cluj	Cluj-Napoca
18:15 EET (UTC+2)		Report	Hammershøy-Mistrati (yellow card) 42'; Hoban 50'; Malele 81'; Bîrligea 87' 90' 90+1'	Stadium: Stadionul Dr. Constantin Rădulescu; Referee: (Romania) Robert Avram

7 December 2022 3	Farul Constanța	v	CFR Cluj	TBD
--:-- EET (UTC+2)

=== Supercupa României ===
9 July 2022 Final	CFR Cluj	1–2	Sepsi Sfântu Gheorghe	Arad
20:30 EEST (UTC+3)	Păun 2'	Report	Matei 45+3'; Rondón 85'	Stadium: Stadionul Francisc von Neuman; Attendance: 10,571; Referee: Adrian Cojocaru

=== UEFA Champions League ===
==== First qualifying round ====
5 July 2022 First leg	Pyunik (Armenia)	0–0	(Romania) CFR Cluj	Yerevan, Armenia
20:00 AMT (UTC+4)		Report		Stadium: Vazgen Sargsyan Republican Stadium; Attendance: 8,000; Referee: Bastian Dankert (Germany)

13 July 2022 Second leg	CFR Cluj (Romania)	2–2 (a.e.t.) (2–2 agg.) (3–4 p)	(Armenia) Pyunik	Cluj-Napoca, Romania
21:30 EEST (UTC+3)	Adjei-Boateng 6'; Petrila 94'	Report	Gajić 89', 119'	Stadium: Stadionul Dr. Constantin Rădulescu; Attendance: 7,017; Referee: Michael Fabbri (Italy)
	Penalties
	Dugandžić (penalty scored); Petrila (penalty missed); Burcă (penalty scored); Muhar (penalty scored); Camora (penalty missed)		(penalty scored) Cociuc; (penalty scored) Dashyan; (penalty scored) Harutyunyan; (penalty scored) Avagyan

=== UEFA Europa Conference League ===
==== Second qualifying round ====
21 July 2022 First leg	CFR Cluj (Romania)	3–0	(Andorra) Inter Club d'Escaldes	Cluj-Napoca, Romania
20:30 EEST (UTC+3)	Betancor 5' (pen.); Debeljuh 38'; Feher 84' (o.g.)	Report		Stadium: Stadionul Dr. Constantin Rădulescu; Attendance: 4,421; Referee: Alex Troleis (Faroe Islands)

27 July 2022 Second leg	Inter Club d'Escaldes (Andorra)	1–1 (1–4 agg.)	(Romania) CFR Cluj	Andorra la Vella, Andorra
19:00 CEST (UTC+2)	Soldevila 21'	Report	Deac 51' (pen.)	Stadium: Estadi Comunal; Attendance: 242; Referee: Kristoffer Hagenes (Norway)

==== Third qualifying round ====
4 August 2022 First leg	Shakhtyor Soligorsk (Belarus)	0–0	(Romania) CFR Cluj	Adapazarı, Turkey
20:00 TRT (UTC+3)		Report		Stadium: New Sakarya Stadium; Attendance: 0 Referee: Ioannis Papadopoulos (Greece)
Note: Due to the country's involvement in the Russian invasion of Ukraine, Belarusian teams were required to play their home matches at neutral venues and behind closed doors until further notice.

11 August 2022 Second leg	CFR Cluj (Romania)	1–0 (1–0 agg.)	(Belarus) Shakhtyor Soligorsk	Cluj-Napoca, Romania
20:00 EEST (UTC+3)	Betancor 37'	Report		Stadium: Stadionul Dr. Constantin Rădulescu; Attendance: 6,700; Referee: Morten Krogh (Denmark)

==== Play-off round ====
18 August 2022 First leg	Maribor (Slovenia)	0–0	(Romania) CFR Cluj	Maribor, Slovenia
20:15 CEST (UTC+2)		Report		Stadium: Ljudski vrt Attendance: 4,500; Referee: Pavel Orel (Czech Republic)

25 August 2022 Second leg	CFR Cluj (Romania)	1–0 (1–0 agg.)	(Slovenia) Maribor	Cluj-Napoca, Romania
20:00 EEST (UTC+3)	Cvek 90'	Report		Stadium: Stadionul Dr. Constantin Rădulescu; Attendance: 9,852; Referee: John Beaton (Scotland)

==== Group stage ====
The draw for the group stage was held on 26 August 2022.

Pos	Team	Pld	W	D	L	GF	GA	GD	Pts	Qualification	SIV	CLJ	SLP	BLK
1	(Turkey) Sivasspor	6	3	2	1	11	7	+4	11	Advance to round of 16	—	3–0	1–1	3–4
2	(Romania) CFR Cluj	6	3	1	2	5	5	0	10	Advance to knockout round play-offs	0–1	—	2–0	1–0
3	(Czech Republic) Slavia Prague	6	2	2	2	6	7	−1	8		1–1	0–1	—	3–2
4	(Kosovo) Ballkani	6	1	1	4	8	11	−3	4		1–2	1–1	0–1	—

Source: UEFA
Rules for classification: Group stage tiebreakers

8 September 2022 1	Ballkani (Kosovo)	1–1	(Romania) CFR Cluj	Pristina
18:45 CEST (UTC+2)	Ar. Thaqi 65'	Report	Matias 90+1'	Stadium: Fadil Vokrri Stadium; Attendance: 5,673; Referee: Urs Schnyder (Switzerland)
Note: Ballkani played their home matches at Fadil Vokrri Stadium, Pristina, instead of their regular stadium, Suva Reka City Stadium, Suhareka, which did not meet UEFA requirements.

15 September 2022 2	CFR Cluj (Romania)	0–1	(Turkey) Sivasspor	Cluj-Napoca, Romania
19:45 EEST (UTC+3)		Report	Gradel 28' (pen.)	Stadium: Stadionul Dr. Constantin Rădulescu; Attendance: 7,026; Referee: Allard Lindhout (Netherlands)

6 October 2022 3	Slavia Prague (Czech Republic)	0–1	(Romania) CFR Cluj	Prague, Czech Republic
21:00 CEST (UTC+2)		Report	Janga 45'	Stadium: Fortuna Arena; Attendance: 18,271; Referee: Fabio Maresca (Italy)

13 October 2022 4	CFR Cluj (Romania)	2–0	(Czech Republic) Slavia Prague	Cluj-Napoca, Romania
19:45 EEST (UTC+3)	Deac 11' (pen.); Matias 84'	Report		Stadium: Stadionul Dr. Constantin Rădulescu; Attendance: 11,218; Referee: Luís Godinho (Portugal)

27 October 2022 5	Sivasspor (Turkey)	3–0	(Romania) CFR Cluj	Sivas, Turkey
22:00 TRT (UTC+3)	Yatabaré 22', 73'; Janga 64' (o.g.)	Report		Stadium: New Sivas 4 Eylül Stadium; Attendance: 6,050; Referee: Rohit Saggi (Norway)

3 November 2022 6	CFR Cluj (Romania)	1–0	(Kosovo) Ballkani	Cluj-Napoca, Romania
19:45 EET (UTC+2)	Adjei-Boateng 17'	Report		Stadium: Stadionul Dr. Constantin Rădulescu; Attendance: 11,723; Referee: Daniel Schlager (Germany)

==== Knockout phase ====
===== Knockout round play-offs =====
The draw for the knockout round play-offs was held on 7 November 2022.

16 February 2023 First leg	Lazio (Italy)	1–0	(Romania) CFR Cluj	Rome, Italy
21:00 CET (UTC+1)	Immobile 45+4'	Report		Stadium: Stadio Olimpico; Referee: Craig Pawson (England)

23 February 2023 Second leg	CFR Cluj (Romania)	0–0 (0–1 agg.)	(Italy) Lazio	Cluj-Napoca, Romania
19:45 EET (UTC+2)		Report		Stadium: Stadionul Dr. Constantin Rădulescu
