= Rareș Pop =

Romanian footballer (born 2005)

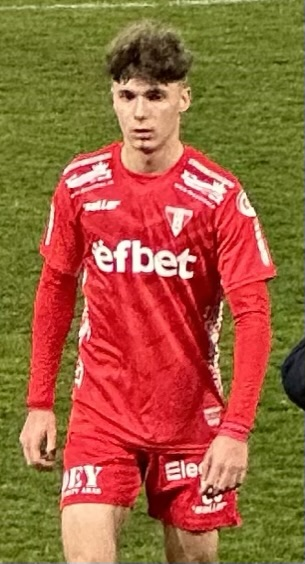
- Pop with UTA Arad in 2023

Personal information
- Full name: Rareș Mihai Pop
- Date of birth: 14 June 2005 (age 21)
- Place of birth: Arad, Romania
- Height: 1.77 m (5 ft 10 in)
- Position: Right midfielder

Team information
- Current team: Rapid București
- Number: 55

Youth career
- –2010: Gloria Arad
- 2010–2020: Atletico Arad
- 2020–2022: UTA Arad

Senior career*
| Years | Team | Apps | (Gls) |
| 2022–2024 | UTA Arad | 53 | (6) |
| 2024– | Rapid București | 38 | (4) |
| 2024 | → UTA Arad (loan) | 11 | (2) |
| 2026 | → Petrolul Ploiești (loan) | 17 | (3) |

International career^{‡}
| 2020 | Romania U16 | 1 | (0) |
| 2022 | Romania U17 | 3 | (1) |
| 2022 | Romania U18 | 6 | (0) |
| 2023–2024 | Romania U19 | 12 | (3) |
| 2022–2025 | Romania U20 | 8 | (1) |
| 2023–2025 | Romania U21 | 8 | (0) |
- * Club domestic league appearances and goals as of 7 November 2026 ‡ National team caps and goals as of 18 November 2025

Rareș Mihai Pop (Romanian pronunciation: [ˈrareʃ miˈhaj ˈpop]; born 14 June 2005) is a Romanian professional footballer who plays as a right midfielder for Liga I club Rapid București.

== Club career ==
=== UTA Arad ===
Pop made his Liga I debut for UTA Arad on 1 May 2022, coming on for David Miculescu in the 79th minute of a 0–1 away loss to FC U Craiova. He scored his first professional goal on 19 October that year, in a 2–2 draw with FCSB in the Cupa României group stage.

On 11 February 2023, Pop netted his first Liga I goal and also provided an assist in a 3–1 home victory over Botoșani, and on 2 March scored again in a 1–2 away loss to five-time defending champions CFR Cluj.

=== Rapid București ===
On 12 February 2024, fellow Liga I club Rapid București signed Pop on a four-and-a-half-year contract for a rumoured transfer fee of €700,000. He was immediately loaned back to UTA Arad for the remainder of the season.

Pop made his Rapid București debut on 5 August 2024, coming on for Claudiu Petrila in the 76th minute of a 2–2 home league draw with Sepsi OSK. On the 23rd that month, he scored his first goal in a 2–1 away win over Politehnica Iași. One month later, he scored his first career double in a fixture with newly-promoted Unirea Slobozia, also a 2–1 away victory.

== Career statistics ==
As of match played 7 November 2026

Appearances and goals by club, season and competition
| Club | Season | League | | | Cupa României | | Europe | | Other | | Total | |
| Club | Season | Division | Apps | Goals | Apps | Goals | Apps | Goals | Apps | Goals | Apps | Goals |
|---|---|---|---|---|---|---|---|---|---|---|---|---|
| UTA Arad | 2021–22 | Liga I | 3 | 0 | 0 | 0 | — | | — | | 3 | 0 |
| UTA Arad | 2022–23 | Liga I | 25 | 3 | 4 | 1 | — | | 2 (Note: Appearances in Liga I promotion/relegation play-offs) | 0 | 31 | 4 |
| UTA Arad | 2023–24 | Liga I | 36 | 5 | 4 | 0 | — | | — | | 40 | 5 |
| UTA Arad | Total | | 64 | 8 | 8 | 1 | — | | 2 | 0 | 74 | 9 |
| Rapid București | 2024–25 | Liga I | 23 | 3 | 2 | 1 | — | | — | | 25 | 4 |
| Rapid București | 2025–26 | Liga I | 7 | 1 | 2 | 0 | — | | — | | 9 | 1 |
| Rapid București | 2026–27 | Liga I | 8 | 0 | 2 | 0 | — | | — | | 10 | 0 |
| Rapid București | Total | | 38 | 4 | 6 | 1 | — | | — | | 44 | 5 |
| Petrolul Ploiești (loan) | 2025–26 | Liga I | 17 | 3 | 0 | 0 | — | | — | | 17 | 3 |
| Career total | | | 119 | 15 | 14 | 2 | — | | 2 | 0 | 135 | 17 |
