= Ermal Krasniqi =

Kosovan footballer (born 1998)

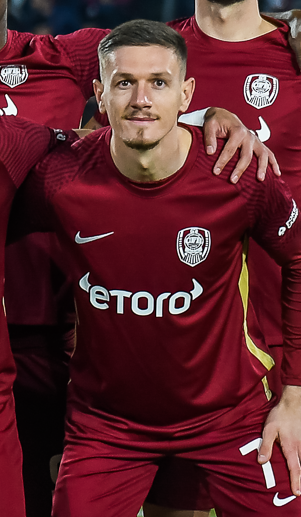
- Krasniqi with CFR Cluj in 2023

Personal information
- Date of birth: 7 September 1998 (age 28)
- Place of birth: Malishevë, FR Yugoslavia
- Height: 1.88 m (6 ft 2 in)
- Position: Winger

Team information
- Current team: Amedspor
- Number: 7

Youth career
- 2016–2017: Feronikeli

Senior career*
Years	Team	Apps	(Gls)
2017–2018	Malisheva		
2018–2019	Llapi	1	(0)
2019	Ferizaj	10	(6)
2019–2023	Ballkani	88	(34)
2023–2024	CFR Cluj	30	(4)
2024	Rapid București	17	(6)
2024–2026	Sparta Prague	28	(4)
2025–2026	→ Legia Warsaw (loan)	25	(2)
2026–	Amedspor	11	(1)

International career^{‡}
2020	Kosovo U21	1	(0)
2022–	Kosovo	19	(2)
- * Club domestic league appearances and goals as of 00:00, 7 November 2026 (UTC) ‡ National team caps and goals as of 19:10, 4 October 2026 (UTC)

Ermal Krasniqi (born 7 September 1998) is a Kosovan professional footballer who plays as a winger or wing-back for Süper Lig club Amedspor and the Kosovo national team.

== Club career ==
=== Early career and Ballkani ===
Krasniqi spent the last part of his youth career at Feronikeli, before returning to his hometown club Malisheva in 2017. There, he finished his first season as a senior on the third place in the Kosovo Second League. In the summer in 2018, Krasniqi was transferred to Kosovo Superleague side Llapi, but in January 2019 moved to fellow league team Ferizaj due to a lack of play time. He amassed six goals from ten games for the latter, aiding it to a middle-table finish.

On 7 August 2019, Krasniqi signed a two-year contract with top flight club Ballkani. In the 2021–22 season, he scored 15 league goals as Ballkani won its first national title. On 5 July 2022, he made his European competitions debut by starting in a 1–1 home draw to Žalgiris in the first qualifying round of the UEFA Champions League.

Three weeks later, following his team's elimination from the Champions League, Krasniqi scored in a 6–0 home thrashing of La Fiorita in the second qualifying round of the Europa Conference League. He made five appearances in the group stage of the latter competition, scoring one goal each against Slavia Prague (2–3 away loss) and Sivasspor (4–3 away win).

=== CFR Cluj ===
On 10 January 2023, Krasniqi signed a three-and-a-half-year contract with his former Europa Conference League opponent CFR Cluj, being assigned the number 7 jersey. The fee was reported as €200,000 and 15% interest on a potential future transfer, plus €100,000 in conditional bonuses. He made his debut 13 days later in a Liga I match against eventual champions Farul Constanța, scoring and assisting in the 3–0 away win.

Krasniqi amassed five goals from 22 appearances in all competitions during the remainder of the 2022–23 season, but fell out of favour after Andrea Mandorlini replaced Dan Petrescu as the head coach of the club in the summer of that year.

=== Rapid București ===
On 28 December 2023, fellow Liga I club Rapid București signed Krasniqi on a two-and-a-half-year deal with the option of another year, for a transfer fee rumoured to be worth €1 million plus 25% interest. On 19 January 2024, he scored on debut in a 4–3 home league win over FC U Craiova.

On 9 March 2024, Krasniqi scored and assisted compatriot Albion Rrahmani as their team thrashed rivals FCSB 4–0 in the last fixture of the regular season. He scored once more against FCSB in a 2–2 away draw in the championship play-offs, on 20 April. On 5 May, he opened the scoring away at his former team CFR Cluj in a 2–3 league loss.

=== Sparta Prague ===
On 7 June 2024, Krasniqi signed a contract with Czech First League club Sparta Prague.

==== Legia Warsaw (loan) ====
On 25 August 2025, Krasniqi was loaned to Ekstraklasa club Legia Warsaw with an option to buy.

=== Amedspor ===
On 26 June 2026, Krasniqi signed a contract with Süper Lig club Amedspor.

== International career ==
=== Under-21 ===
On 29 August 2020, Krasniqi received a call-up from the Kosovo national under-21 team for the 2021 UEFA European Championship qualification match against England, and made his debut after coming on as a 57th-minute substitute for Valmir Veliu in the 0–6 loss.

=== Senior ===
On 11 November 2022, Krasniqi was called up by the Kosovo national team for the friendly matches against Armenia and the Faroe Islands. His made his full debut eight days later by starting in a 1–1 draw against the latter opponent.

After his debut for Kosovo, there were reports that Krasniqi would switch his allegiance to Albania. However, on 19 June 2023 he made his competitive debut for Kosovo in a 1–2 defeat to Belarus counting for the UEFA Euro 2024 qualifiers.

On 12 October, during a 2024–25 UEFA Nations League game against Lithuania, he scored his first international goal for Kosovo.

== Career statistics ==
=== Club ===
As of match played 17 May 2026

Appearances and goals by club, season and competition
Club	Season	League			National cup (Note: Includes Cupa României, Czech Cup, Polish Cup)		Europe		Other		Total	
Club	Season	Division	Apps	Goals	Apps	Goals	Apps	Goals	Apps	Goals	Apps	Goals
CFR Cluj	2022–23	Liga I	18	4	1	1	2 (Note: Appearance(s) in UEFA Conference League)	0	1 (Note: Appearance in Liga I European play-offs)	0	22	5
CFR Cluj	2023–24	Liga I	12	0	3	0	2	0	—		17	0
CFR Cluj	Total		30	4	4	1	4	0	1	0	39	5
Rapid București	2023–24	Liga I	17	6	—		—		—		17	6
Sparta Prague	2024–25	Czech First League	27	4	2	0	11 (Note: Appearances in UEFA Champions League)	0	—		40	4
Sparta Prague	2025–26	Czech First League	1	0	—		1	1	—		2	1
Sparta Prague	Total		28	4	2	0	12	1	—		42	5
Legia Warsaw (loan)	2025–26	Ekstraklasa	25	2	1	0	5	0	—		31	2
Career total			100	16	7	1	21	1	1	0	129	18

=== International ===
As of match played 4 October 2026

Appearances and goals by national team and year
National team	Year	Apps	Goals
Kosovo
Kosovo	2022	1	0
Kosovo	2023	3	0
Kosovo	2024	4	2
Kosovo	2025	5	0
Kosovo	2026	6	0
Total		19	2

Scores and results list Kosovo's goal tally first, score column indicates score after each Ermal Krasniki goal.

List of international goals scored by Ermal Krasniqi
No.	Date	Venue	Opponent	Score	Result	Competition	Ref.
1	12 October 2024	Darius and Girėnas Stadium, Kaunas, Lithuania	Lithuania	2–0	2–1	2024–25 UEFA Nations League C	
2	15 October 2024	Fadil Vokrri Stadium, Pristina, Kosovo	Cyprus	2–0	3–0	2024–25 UEFA Nations League C	

== Honours ==
Ballkani

- Kosovo Superleague: 2021–22
- Kosovar Cup runner-up: 2019–20
