= Costinel =

Costinel is a Romanian male given name. Notable people with the name include:

- Costinel Gugu (born 1992), Romanian footballer
- Costinel Tofan (born 1996), Romanian footballer
- Costinel Dinu (born 1980, Almaj, Dolj), Romanian engineer
- Costinel Mădulărea (born 1979, Buzău), Romanian engineer
