= Daniel Bîrzu =

Romanian footballer (born 2002)

Personal information
- Full name: Daniel Teodor Bîrzu
- Date of birth: 28 May 2002 (age 24)
- Place of birth: Constanța, Romania
- Height: 1.98 m (6 ft 6 in)
- Position: Centre back

Youth career
- 2009–2022: Gheorghe Hagi Academy

Senior career*
Years	Team	Apps	(Gls)
2022–2024	Farul Constanța	3	(0)
2024	→ Viitorul Târgu Jiu (loan)	8	(0)
2024	Viitorul Târgu Jiu	1	(0)
2025	1599 Șelimbăr	0	(0)
2025–2026	AFC Câmpulung Muscel	16	(0)

International career
2021–2022	Romania U20	5	(0)
2022	Romania U21	2	(0)
- * Club domestic league appearances and goals as of 4 April 2026

Daniel Teodor Bîrzu (born 28 May 2002) is a Romanian professional footballer who plays as a centre back.

== Club career ==
=== Farul Constanța ===
He made his league debut on 20 May 2022 in Liga I match against Universitatea Craiova.

== Career statistics ==
=== Club ===
As of match played 4 April 2026

Appearances and goals by club, season and competition
Club	Season	League			National Cup (Note: Includes Cupa României)		Europe		Other (Note: Appearances in Supercupa României)		Total	
Club	Season	Division	Apps	Goals	Apps	Goals	Apps	Goals	Apps	Goals	Apps	Goals
Farul Constanța	2021–22	Liga I	1	0	—		—		—		1	0
Farul Constanța	2022–23	Liga I	2	0	1	0	—		—		3	0
Farul Constanța	2023–24	Liga I	0	0	1	0	0	0	0	0	1	0
Farul Constanța	Total		3	0	2	0	0	0	0	0	5	0
Viitorul Târgu Jiu (loan)	2023–24	Liga II	8	0	—		—		—		8	0
Viitorul Târgu Jiu	2024–25	Liga II	1	0	2	0	—		—		3	0
Viitorul Târgu Jiu	Total		9	0	2	0	—		—		11	0
1599 Șelimbăr	2024–25	Liga II	0	0	—		—		—		0	0
AFC Câmpulung Muscel	2025–26	Liga II	16	0	1	0	—		—		17	0
Career Total			28	0	5	0	0	0	0	0	33	0

== Honours ==
Farul Constanța

- Liga I: 2022–23
- Supercupa României runner-up: 2023
