= Karlo Muhar =

Croatian footballer

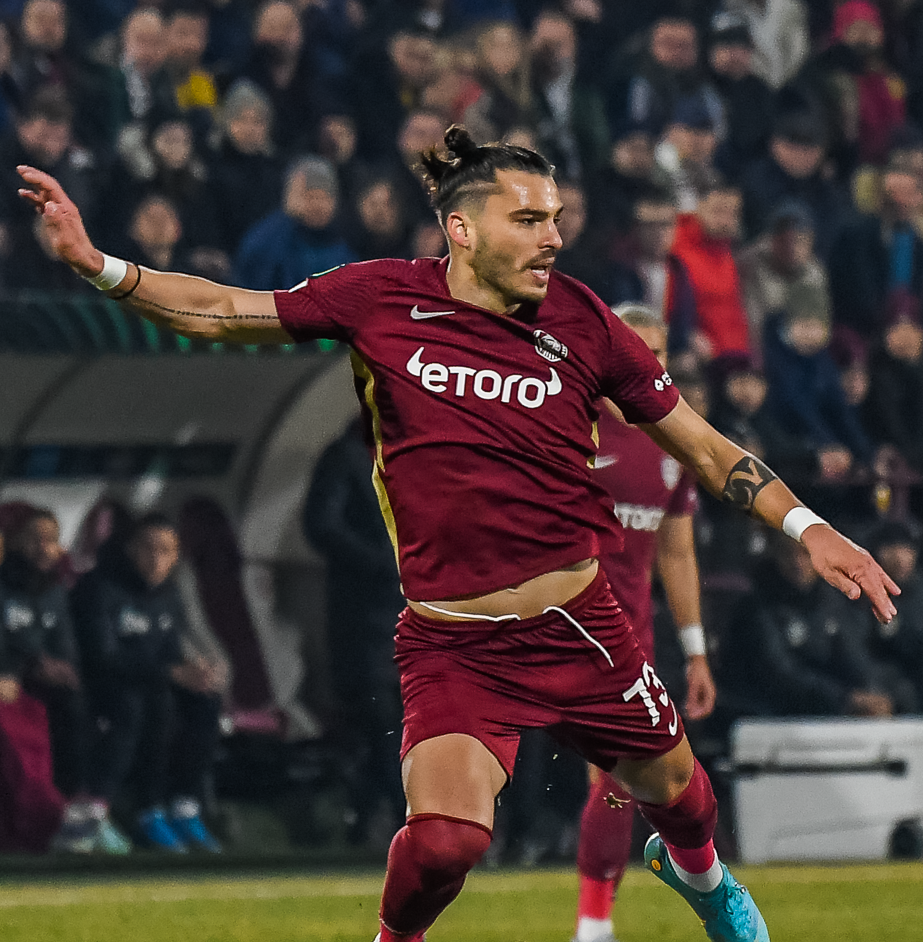
- Muhar playing for CFR Cluj in 2023.

Personal information
- Date of birth: 17 January 1996 (age 30)
- Place of birth: Zagreb, Croatia
- Height: 1.90 m (6 ft 3 in)
- Position: Midfielder

Team information
- Current team: FCSB
- Number: 73

Youth career
- 2004–2005: Zelengaj
- 2005: Lukavec
- 2005–2011: Velika Mlaka
- 2011–2014: Lokomotiva
- 2014: Dinamo Zagreb

Senior career*
Years	Team	Apps	(Gls)
2014–2018	Dinamo Zagreb II	96	(9)
2018	Dinamo Zagreb	1	(0)
2018–2019	Inter Zaprešić	34	(2)
2019–2022	Lech Poznań	35	(1)
2019–2020	Lech Poznań II	4	(1)
2021	→ Kayserispor (loan)	16	(1)
2021–2022	→ CSKA Sofia (loan)	25	(2)
2022–2024	CFR Cluj	72	(15)
2024–2025	Al-Orobah	31	(0)
2025–2026	CFR Cluj	28	(2)
2026–	FCSB	8	(1)
- * Club domestic league appearances and goals as of 22 November 2026

Karlo Muhar (born 17 January 1996) is a Croatian professional footballer who plays as a midfielder for Liga I club FCSB.

== Career ==
=== Lech Poznań ===
On 5 June 2019, he signed a four-year contract with Polish side Lech Poznań. He made his debut in Lech on 20 July 2019 in a game against defending champion Piast Gliwice.

=== Kayserispor ===
On 28 January 2021, he signed a 6-month contract with Turkish club Kayserispor.

=== CFR Cluj ===
On 8 June 2022, Muhar joined the defending Romanian Liga I champions CFR Cluj on a permanent basis.

=== Al-Orobah ===
On 22 August 2024, Muhar joined the newly promoted Saudi Pro League side Al-Orobah FC.

== Career statistics ==
=== Club ===
As of match played 22 November 2026

Appearances and goals by club, season and competition
Club	Season	League			National cup (Note: Includes Croatian Cup, Polish Cup, Bulgarian Cup, Cupa României, King's Cup)		Europe		Other		Total	
Club	Season	Division	Apps	Goals	Apps	Goals	Apps	Goals	Apps	Goals	Apps	Goals
Dinamo Zagreb II	2014–15	3. NL	20	4	—		—		—		20	4
Dinamo Zagreb II	2015–16	2. HNL	23	3	—		—		—		23	3
Dinamo Zagreb II	2016–17	2. HNL	25	1	—		—		—		25	1
Dinamo Zagreb II	2017–18	2. HNL	28	1	—		—		—		28	1
Dinamo Zagreb II	Total		96	9	—		—		—		96	9
Dinamo Zagreb	2017–18	Prva HNL	1	0	0	0	0	0	—		1	0
Inter Zaprešić	2018–19	Prva HNL	34	2	3	1	—		—		37	3
Lech Poznań	2019–20	Ekstraklasa	29	1	3	0	—		—		32	1
Lech Poznań	2020–21	Ekstraklasa	6	0	2	0	5 (Note: Appearances in UEFA Europa League)	0	—		13	0
Lech Poznań	Total		35	1	5	0	5	0	—		45	1
Kayserispor (loan)	2020–21	Süper Lig	16	1	—		—		—		16	1
CSKA Sofia (loan)	2021–22	First League	25	2	6	0	5 (Note: Appearances in UEFA Europa Conference League)	0	—		36	2
CFR Cluj	2022–23	Liga I	32	5	2	0	12 (Note: One appearance in UEFA Champions League, eleven appearances in UEFA Europa Conference League)	0	2 (Note: One appearance in Supercupa României, one appearance in Liga I European play-offs)	0	48	5
CFR Cluj	2023–24	Liga I	38	10	4	1	1	0	—		43	11
CFR Cluj	2024–25	Liga I	2	0	—		4	2	—		6	2
CFR Cluj	Total		72	15	6	1	17	2	2	0	97	18
Al-Orobah	2024–25	Saudi Pro League	31	0	1	0	—		—		32	0
CFR Cluj	2025–26	Liga I	25	2	4	0	3	1	1 (Note: Appearance in Supercupa României)	0	33	3
CFR Cluj	2026–27	Liga I	3	0	—		3	1	—		6	1
CFR Cluj	Total		28	2	4	0	6	1	1	0	39	4
FCSB	2026–27	Liga I	8	1	0	0	—		—		8	1
Career total			346	33	25	2	33	4	3	0	407	39

== Honours ==
Dinamo Zagreb

- 1. HNL: 2017–18
- Croatian Cup: 2017–18

CSKA Sofia

- Bulgarian Cup runner-up: 2021–22

CFR Cluj

- Supercupa României runner-up: 2022, 2025

Individual

- Liga I Team of the Season: 2023–24
