= Dan Sîrbu =

Romanian footballer

Personal information
- Date of birth: 22 April 2003 (age 23)
- Place of birth: Galați, Romania
- Height: 1.86 m (6 ft 1 in)
- Positions: Defender; defensive midfielder

Team information
- Current team: Farul Constanța
- Number: 21

Youth career
- –2016: Oțelul Galați
- 2016–2018: Metalul Galați
- 2018–2022: Gheorghe Hagi Academy

Senior career*
Years	Team	Apps	(Gls)
2022–	Farul Constanța	122	(0)

International career^{‡}
2019	Romania U16	4	(0)
2019–2020	Romania U17	7	(0)
2021	Romania U18	2	(0)
2021	Romania U19	15	(0)
2022–2023	Romania U20	4	(0)
2022–2025	Romania U21	6	(0)
- * Club domestic league appearances and goals as of 30 August 2026 ‡ National team caps and goals as of 11 June 2025

Dan Sîrbu (born 22 April 2003) is a Romanian professional footballer who plays as a defender or a defensive midfielder for Liga I club Farul Constanța.

== Club career ==
=== Farul Constanța ===
He made his league debut on 27 February 2022 in Liga I match against FCSB.

== Career statistics ==
As of match played 30 August 2026

Appearances and goals by club, season and competition
Club	Season	League			Cupa României		Europe		Other		Total	
Club	Season	Division	Apps	Goals	Apps	Goals	Apps	Goals	Apps	Goals	Apps	Goals
Farul Constanța	2021–22	Liga I	4	0	—		—		—		4	0
Farul Constanța	2022–23	Liga I	30	0	3	0	—		—		33	0
Farul Constanța	2023–24	Liga I	31	0	1	0	8 (Note: Two appearances in UEFA Champions League, six appearances in UEFA Europa Conference League)	0	1 (Note: Appearance in Supercupa României)	0	41	0
Farul Constanța	2024–25	Liga I	32	0	1	0	—		—		33	0
Farul Constanța	2025–26	Liga I	18	0	3	0	—		2 (Note: Appearances in Liga I promotion/relegation play-offs)	0	23	0
Farul Constanța	2026–27	Liga I	7	0	0	0	—		—		7	0
Career total			122	0	8	0	8	0	3	0	141	0

== Honours ==
Farul Constanța

- Liga I: 2022–23
- Supercupa României runner-up: 2023
