= Emmanuel Yeboah (footballer) =

Ghanaian footballer (born 2003)

Personal information
- Full name: Emmanuel Kwaku Yeboah
- Date of birth: 25 February 2003 (age 23)
- Place of birth: Sunyani, Ghana
- Height: 1.88 m (6 ft 2 in)
- Position: Winger

Team information
- Current team: Corvinul Hunedoara
- Number: 99

Youth career
- New Vision Academy
- –2021: Duayaw Nkwanta
- 2021–2022: Young Apostles
- 2022: CFR Cluj

Senior career*
| Years | Team | Apps | (Gls) |
| 2021–2022 | Young Apostles | 16 | (10) |
| 2022–2023 | CFR Cluj | 34 | (5) |
| 2023–2026 | Brøndby | 6 | (2) |
| 2024–2025 | → Vejle (loan) | 9 | (0) |
| 2025–2026 | → Halmstad BK (loan) | 14 | (1) |
| 2026– | Corvinul Hunedoara | 14 | (1) |

International career
| 2023 | Ghana U23 | 3 | (3) |
- * Club domestic league appearances and goals as of 7 November 2026

Emmanuel Kwaku Yeboah (born 25 February 2003) is a Ghanaian professional footballer who plays as a winger for Liga I club Corvinul Hunedoara.

== Career ==
=== Young Apostles ===
Yeboah started his senior career with Ghanaian team Young Apostles in 2021, which he left at the start of the next year.

=== CFR Cluj ===
Initially assigned to the reserve team, Yeboah made his debut for CFR Cluj in a 1–0 Liga I victory over Rapid București on 16 July 2022. He became a first-team regular under manager Dan Petrescu, scoring three goals in 16 league appearances by the end of the calendar year.

On 5 January 2023, CFR announced that a move of Yeboah to Slavia Prague fell through after a meniscus issue was reportedly found during his medical; the Czech team then proposed a one-year loan with an option to buy instead of a full transfer, which CFR declined.

=== Brøndby ===
On 19 August 2023, Yeboah joined Danish Superliga club Brøndby IF on a deal until June 2027. He made his debut for the club on 27 September, replacing Yuito Suzuki in the 77th minute of a 3–0 Danish Cup win over HIK.

==== Loan to Vejle ====
On 2 September 2024 Danish Superliga club Vejle Boldklub confirmed that Yeboah joined the club on a loan deal until the end of the 2024–25 season. After a disappointing spell at Vejle, Yeboah returned to Brøndby in the summer of 2025.

==== Loan to Halmstads BK ====
On 18 July 2025, Yeboah joined Swedish Allsvenskan club Halmstads BK on a season-long loan from Brøndby IF, with an option for the Swedish club to make the move permanent.

== Career statistics ==
As of match played 7 November 2026

Appearances and goals by club, season and competition
| Club | Season | League | | | National cup (Note: Includes Cupa României, Danish Cup, Svenska Cupen) | | Europe | | Other | | Total | |
| Club | Season | Division | Apps | Goals | Apps | Goals | Apps | Goals | Apps | Goals | Apps | Goals |
|---|---|---|---|---|---|---|---|---|---|---|---|---|
| CFR Cluj | 2022–23 | Liga I | 31 | 3 | 3 | 0 | 13 (Note: One appearance in UEFA Champions League, twelve appearances in UEFA Conference League) | 0 | 1 (Note: Appearance in Supercupa României) | 0 | 48 | 3 |
| CFR Cluj | 2023–24 | Liga I | 3 | 2 | — | | 2 (Note: Appearances in UEFA Conference League) | 0 | — | | 5 | 2 |
| CFR Cluj | Total | | 34 | 5 | 3 | 0 | 15 | 0 | 1 | 0 | 53 | 5 |
| Brøndby | 2023–24 | Danish Superliga | 1 | 0 | 1 | 0 | — | | — | | 2 | 0 |
| Brøndby | 2024–25 | Danish Superliga | 5 | 2 | — | | 3 | 1 | — | | 8 | 3 |
| Brøndby | Total | | 6 | 2 | 1 | 0 | 3 | 1 | — | | 10 | 3 |
| Vejle (loan) | 2024–25 | Danish Superliga | 9 | 0 | 1 | 0 | — | | — | | 10 | 0 |
| Halmstad BK (loan) | 2025 | Allsvenskan | 11 | 1 | 1 | 2 | — | | — | | 12 | 3 |
| Halmstad BK (loan) | 2026 | Allsvenskan | 3 | 0 | 3 | 0 | — | | — | | 6 | 0 |
| Halmstad BK (loan) | Total | | 14 | 1 | 4 | 2 | — | | — | | 18 | 3 |
| Corvinul Hunedoara | 2026–27 | Liga I | 14 | 1 | 3 | 1 | — | | — | | 17 | 2 |
| Career total | | | 64 | 11 | 6 | 0 | 18 | 1 | 1 | 0 | 89 | 12 |

== Honours ==
CFR Cluj

- Supercupa României runner-up: 2022
