= Cristian Manea =

Romanian footballer (born 1997)

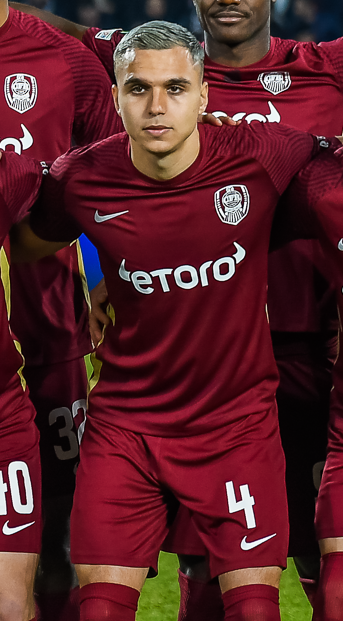
- Manea with CFR Cluj in 2023

Personal information
- Full name: Cristian Marian Manea
- Date of birth: 9 August 1997 (age 29)
- Place of birth: Agigea, Romania
- Height: 1.83 m (6 ft 0 in)
- Position: Right-back

Team information
- Current team: Rapid București
- Number: 23

Youth career
- 2009–2013: Gheorghe Hagi Academy

Senior career*
Years	Team	Apps	(Gls)
2014	Viitorul Constanța	5	(0)
2014–2020	Apollon Limassol	0	(0)
2014–2015	→ Viitorul Constanța (loan)	26	(2)
2015–2017	→ Mouscron (loan)	14	(0)
2017–2019	→ CFR Cluj (loan)	69	(1)
2019–2020	→ FCSB (loan)	2	(0)
2020	→ CFR Cluj (loan)	5	(0)
2020–2024	CFR Cluj	103	(8)
2024–	Rapid București	51	(4)

International career^{‡}
2013	Romania U16	2	(0)
2013–2014	Romania U17	6	(0)
2014–2016	Romania U19	8	(0)
2014–2019	Romania U21	19	(0)
2021	Romania Olympic	2	(0)
2014–	Romania (Note: Manea previously earned two caps for Romania B in 2015, hence the statistical inacurracies.)	26	(2)
- * Club domestic league appearances and goals as of 12 September 2026 ‡ National team caps and goals as of 9 October 2025

Cristian Marian Manea (Romanian pronunciation: [kristiˈan mariˈan ˈmane̯a]; born 9 August 1997) is a Romanian professional footballer who plays as a right-back for Liga I club Rapid București and the Romania national team.

Manea started out as a senior at Viitorul Constanța in 2014, and transferred to Apollon Limassol during that summer. He did not feature in any games for the Cypriots, being loaned out consecutively to Viitorul, Mouscron, CFR Cluj, FCSB, and again CFR Cluj. Manea signed a permanent deal with the latter in 2020, and won seven domestic honours during his stints in Cluj-Napoca. In 2024, he moved to Rapid București as a free agent.

Internationally, Manea became the youngest player to make his debut for Romania after playing in a 1–0 win over Albania in May 2014. (Note: Manea's record was broken by Enes Sali in 2021, who made his senior debut aged 15 years, 8 months and 22 days.) In 2019, he represented the under-21 side in the UEFA European Championship.

== Club career ==
=== Viitorul Constanța ===
Born in Agigea, Constanța County, Manea spent his junior years in the academy of Viitorul Constanța. He made his professional debut for the club on 21 April 2014, in a 0–3 home Liga I loss to Steaua București.

=== Apollon Limassol ===
In the summer of 2014, an investment fund acquired Manea's playing rights and he was registered by Cypriot side Apollon Limassol. The transfer fee was rumoured to be worth €2.5 million.

Previously, Romanian media reported that Manea had been sold to Premier League team Chelsea for roughly £2.3 million, but the rumour proved to be false. In May 2018, the player himself stated that he had believed he would sign for Chelsea and that he had never physically been to Cyprus.

==== Various loans ====
Manea spent the 2014–15 campaign on loan at his former club Viitorul Constanța, and scored his first senior goal in a 2–1 away defeat of Petrolul Ploiești on 13 April 2015.

On 28 August 2015, Manea moved to Belgian team Royal Excel Mouscron on a season-long loan, which was extended for another year. He amassed 18 appearances in all competitions before returning to Romania on 27 June 2017, joining CFR Cluj also on loan. He was an undisputed starter during his stint, winning back-to-back national championships.

On 2 September 2019, fellow Liga I team FCSB agreed a deal to sign Manea on loan with an option to buy. He fell out of favour at the Bucharest-based club, and on 31 January 2020 returned to CFR Cluj on loan for the remainder of the season.

=== CFR Cluj ===
On 6 September 2020, Manea signed a four-year deal with CFR Cluj for an undisclosed transfer fee.

Manea scored his first European goal on 3 August 2021, in a 1–1 home draw with Young Boys in the UEFA Champions League third qualifying round.

=== Rapid București ===
On 24 June 2024, Manea agreed to a three-year contract with Rapid București as a free agent.

== International career ==
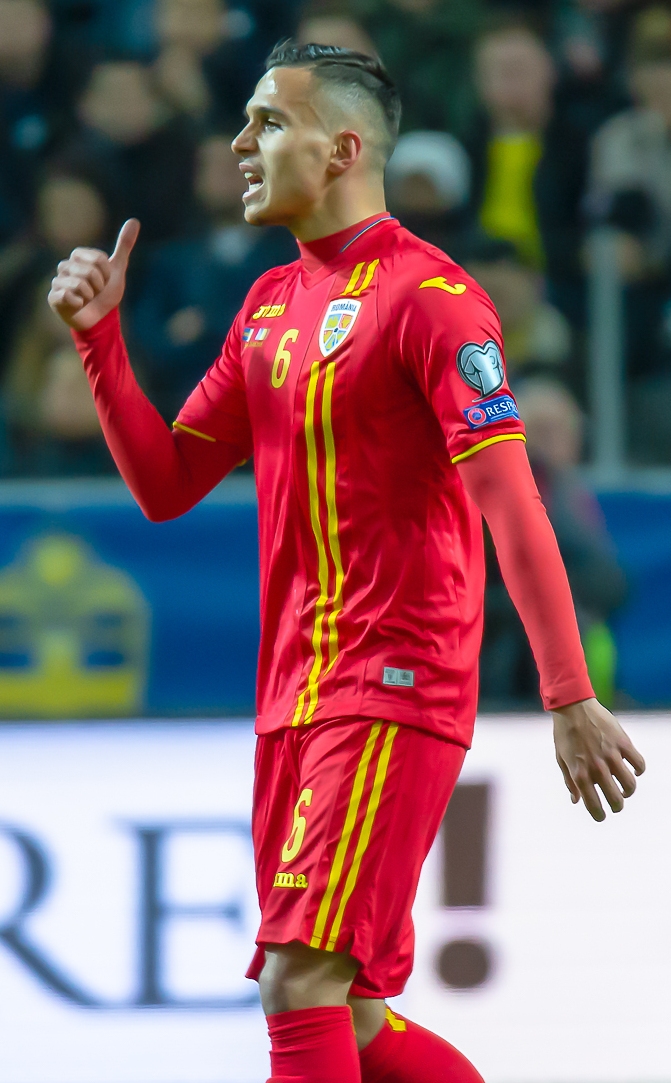
Manea playing for Romania in a game against Sweden, 23 March 2019.

Manea earned caps for Romania at under-16, under-17, under-19, and under-21 levels. In May 2014, he was called up to the senior team by manager Victor Pițurcă, despite having only made five club appearances at the time. Manea made his debut as a starter against Albania on the 31st that month, aged 16 years, 9 months and 22 days. He became the youngest footballer to play for Romania since 1928, after breaking the record set by Grațian Sepi.

Manea registered his first senior goal for the country on 5 June 2018, scoring the opener in a 2–0 friendly win over Finland at the Ilie Oană Stadium in Ploiești. The following year, he featured for the under-21 side in all four matches of the 2019 UEFA European Championship, where Romania was eliminated by Germany in the semi-finals.

== Career statistics ==
=== Club ===
As of match played 27 October 2026

Appearances and goals by club, season and competition
Club	Season	League			National cup (Note: Includes Cupa României, Belgian Cup)		League cup (Note: Includes Cupa Ligii)		Europe		Other		Total	
Club	Season	Division	Apps	Goals	Apps	Goals	Apps	Goals	Apps	Goals	Apps	Goals	Apps	Goals
Viitorul Constanța	2013–14	Liga I	5	0	0	0	—		—		—		5	0
Viitorul Constanța (loan)	2014–15	Liga I	26	2	1	0	2	0	—		—		29	2
Mouscron (loan)	2015–16	Belgian Pro League	7	0	2	0	—		—		—		9	0
Mouscron (loan)	2016–17	Belgian Pro League	7	0	1	0	—		—		—		8	0
Mouscron (loan)	Total		14	0	3	0	—		—		—		17	0
CFR Cluj (loan)	2017–18	Liga I	35	0	0	0	—		—		—		35	0
CFR Cluj (loan)	2018–19	Liga I	34	1	4	0	—		5 (Note: Two appearances in UEFA Champions League, three appearances in UEFA Europa League)	0	1 (Note: Appearance in Supercupa României)	0	44	1
CFR Cluj (loan)	Total		69	1	4	0	—		5	0	1	0	79	1
FCSB (loan)	2019–20	Liga I	2	0	2	0	—		—		—		4	0
CFR Cluj (loan)	2019–20	Liga I	5	0	—		—		2 (Note: Appearances in UEFA Europa League)	0	—		7	0
CFR Cluj	2020–21	Liga I	26	0	1	0	—		5	0	1	0	33	0
CFR Cluj	2021–22	Liga I	25	1	0	0	—		13 (Note: Five appearances and one goal in UEFA Champions League, two appearances in UEFA Europa League, six appearances in UEFA Europa Conference League)	1	1	0	39	2
CFR Cluj	2022–23	Liga I	30	5	0	0	—		14 (Note: Two appearances in UEFA Champions League, 12 appearances in UEFA Europa Conference League)	0	1 (Note: Appearance in Liga I European play-offs)	0	45	5
CFR Cluj	2023–24	Liga I	22	2	1	0	—		2 (Note: Appearances in UEFA Europa Conference League)	0	—		25	2
CFR Cluj	Total		108	8	2	0	—		36	1	3	0	149	9
Rapid București	2024–25	Liga I	25	1	3	0	—		—		—		28	1
Rapid București	2025–26	Liga I	23	3	2	0	—		—		—		25	3
Rapid București	2026–27	Liga I	3	0	2	0	—		—		—		5	0
Rapid București	Total		51	4	7	0	—		—		—		58	4
Career total			275	15	19	0	2	0	41	1	4	0	341	16

=== International ===
As of match played 9 October 2025

Appearances and goals by national team and year
National team	Year	Apps	Goals
Romania	2014	1	0
Romania	2018	6	1
Romania	2019	1	0
Romania	2020	2	0
Romania	2021	5	1
Romania	2022	5	0
Romania	2023	4	0
Romania	2024	1	0
Romania	2025	1	0
Total		26	2

Scores and results list Romania's goal tally first, score column indicates score after each Manea goal.

List of international goals scored by Cristian Manea
No.	Date	Venue	Opponent	Score	Result	Competition
1	5 June 2018	Stadionul Ilie Oană, Ploiești, Romania	Finland	1–0	2–0	Friendly
2	5 September 2021	Arena Națională, Bucharest, Romania	Liechtenstein	2–0	2–0	2022 FIFA World Cup qualification

== Honours ==
CFR Cluj

- Liga I: 2017–18, 2018–19, 2019–20, 2020–21, 2021–22
- Supercupa României: 2018, 2020

Individual

- Liga I Team of the Season: 2017–18, 2022–23
