= Gustavo Marins =

Brazilian footballer

Personal information
- Full name: Gustavo Henrique Marins Silva
- Date of birth: 11 February 2002 (age 24)
- Place of birth: Goiânia, Brazil
- Height: 1.84 m (6 ft 0 in)
- Position: Centre-back

Team information
- Current team: Farul Constanța
- Number: 4

Youth career
- –2022: Grêmio

Senior career*
Years	Team	Apps	(Gls)
2021–2023	Grêmio	0	(0)
2021	→ São Luiz (loan)	0	(0)
2023–	Farul Constanța	76	(1)
- * Club domestic league appearances and goals as of 2 November 2026

Gustavo Henrique Marins Silva (born 11 February 2002) is a Brazilian professional footballer who plays as a centre-back for Liga I club Farul Constanța.

== Club career ==
Gustavo made his Liga I debut for Farul Constanța on 19 March 2023, starting in a 2–1 home win to Sepsi OSK.

== Career statistics ==
As of match played 2 November 2026

Appearances and goals by club, season and competition
Club	Season	League			National cup (Note: Includes Cupa României)		Continental		Other		Total	
Club	Season	Division	Apps	Goals	Apps	Goals	Apps	Goals	Apps	Goals	Apps	Goals
São Luiz (loan)	2021	Campeonato Gaúcho	0	0	—		—		—		0	0
Grêmio	2022	Campeonato Brasileiro Série B	0	0	0	0	—		1 (Note: Appearance in Campeonato Gaúcho)	0	1	0
Farul Constanța	2022–23	Liga I	5	0	—		—		—		5	0
Farul Constanța	2023–24	Liga I	17	0	2	0	1 (Note: Appearance in UEFA Champions League)	0	—		20	0
Farul Constanța	2024–25	Liga I	31	1	3	0	—		—		34	1
Farul Constanța	2025–26	Liga I	12	0	0	0	—		1 (Note: Appearance in Liga I promotion/relegation play-offs)	0	1	0
Farul Constanța	2026–27	Liga I	11	0	0	0	—		—		11	0
Farul Constanța	Total		76	1	5	0	1	0	1	0	83	1
Career total			76	1	5	0	1	0	3	0	84	1

== Honours ==
Grêmio

- Campeonato Gaúcho: 2022

Farul Constanța

- Liga I: 2022–23
- Supercupa României runner-up: 2023
