= Andrei Tofan =

Romanian footballer

Personal information
- Full name: Costinel Andrei Tofan
- Date of birth: 2 August 1996 (age 30)
- Place of birth: Pitești, Romania
- Height: 1.72 m (5 ft 8 in)
- Position: Right-back

Team information
- Current team: Argeș Pitești
- Number: 2

Youth career
- 2006–2013: Argeș Pitești
- 2013–2015: Sporting Pitești
- 2014–2015: → Atletic Bradu (loan)

Senior career*
Years	Team	Apps	(Gls)
2015	Balotești	10	(0)
2016	Sporting Turnu Măgurele		
2016–2017	Sepsi OSK	15	(1)
2017–	Argeș Pitești	234	(2)
- * Club domestic league appearances and goals as of 6 November 2026

Costinel Andrei Tofan (born 2 August 1996) is a Romanian professional footballer who plays as a right back for Liga I club Argeș Pitești, which he captains.

== Career statistics ==
=== Club ===
As of match played 6 November 2026

Club	Season	League			Cupa României		Europe		Other		Total	
Club	Season	Division	Apps	Goals	Apps	Goals	Apps	Goals	Apps	Goals	Apps	Goals
Balotești	2015–16	Liga II	10	0	0	0	–		–		10	0
Sporting Turnu Măgurele	2015–16	Liga III	?	?	–		–		–		?	?
Sepsi OSK	2016–17	Liga II	15	1	1	0	–		–		16	1
Argeș Pitești	2017–18	Liga II	20	0	1	0	–		–		21	0
Argeș Pitești	2018–19	Liga II	28	0	0	0	–		–		28	0
Argeș Pitești	2019–20	Liga II	23	0	0	0	–		–		23	0
Argeș Pitești	2020–21	Liga I	31	0	1	0	–		–		32	0
Argeș Pitești	2021–22	Liga I	33	0	2	0	–		–		35	0
Argeș Pitești	2022–23	Liga I	34	1	4	1	–		2 (Note: Appearances in Liga I promotion/relegation play-offs)	1	40	3
Argeș Pitești	2023–24	Liga II	24	1	1	0	–		–		25	1
Argeș Pitești	2024–25	Liga II	16	0	0	0	–		–		16	0
Argeș Pitești	2025–26	Liga I	12	0	2	0	–		–		14	0
Argeș Pitești	2026–27	Liga I	13	0	1	0	–		–		14	0
Argeș Pitești	Total		234	2	12	1	–		2	1	248	4
Career total			259	3	13	1	–		2	1	274	5

== Honours ==
Argeș Pitești

- Liga II: 2024–25
