= 2021–22 FC UTA Arad season =

FC UTA Arad
2021–22 season
- Stadium: Francisc von Neuman Stadium
- Top goalscorer: League: David Miculescu (8); All: David Miculescu (8)

The 2021–22 season was the 77th season for FC UTA Arad and the club's second consecutive season in the Romanian Premier League.

== Transfers ==
=== In ===
Pos.	Player	Transferred from	Fee	Date	Source
MF	(Argentina) Juan Pablo Passaglia	(Romania) ACSM Poli Iasi	Free	1 July 2021	
FW	(Croatia) Filip Dangubić	(Slovenia) NK Celje	Free	14 July 2021	
MF	(Lithuania) Karolis Laukžemis	(Kazakhstan) FC Kaisar	Free	3 January 2022	
MF	(Italy) Nicolao Dumitru	(South Korea) Suwon Bluewings	Free	17 January 2022	

=== Out ===
Pos.	Player	Transferred to	Fee	Date	Source
FW	(Romania) Adrian Petre	(Romania) FCV Farul	Free	1 July 2021	
DF	(Albania) Simo Rumbullaku	(Romania) Chindia Târgoviște	Free	1 July 2021	
FW	(Romania) Ioan Hora	(Romania) FC Hermannstadt	Free	11 January 2022	
MF	(Argentina) Juan Pablo Passaglia	(Romania) Chindia Târgoviște	Free	3 February 2022	

== Pre-season and friendlies ==
25 June 2021 Friendly	UTA Arad (Romania)	2–0	(Romania) 1599 Selimbar

30 June 2021 Friendly	HNK Gorica (Croatia)	1–1	(Romania) UTA Arad

3 July 2021 Friendly	Aluminij (Slovenia)	1–2	(Romania) UTA Arad

8 July 2021 Friendly	Hajduk Split (Croatia)	1–0	(Romania) UTA Arad

14 July 2021 Friendly	UTA Arad (Romania)	3–2	(Romania) Ripensia Timișoara

4 September 2021 Friendly	UTA Arad (Romania)	0–0	(Serbia) FK Kolubara

9 January 2022 Friendly	UTA Arad (Romania)	1–4	(Belgium) Sporting Charleroi

12 January 2022 Friendly	UTA Arad (Romania)	2–1	(Gabon) AS Pélican

14 January 2022 Friendly	FC Aarau (Switzerland)	2–1	(Romania) UTA Arad

== Competitions ==
=== Liga I ===
==== Regular season ====
Pos	Team	Pld	W	D	L	GF	GA	GD	Pts	Qualification
6	Voluntari	30	13	8	9	31	27	+4	47	Qualification for the Play-off round
7	Botoșani	30	11	13	6	33	28	+5	46	Qualification for the Play-out round
8	UTA Arad	30	9	13	8	24	20	+4	40	Qualification for the Play-out round
9	Rapid București	30	9	13	8	34	31	+3	40	Qualification for the Play-out round
10	Sepsi OSK	30	9	12	9	33	29	+4	39	Qualification for the Play-out round

Source: LPF (in Romanian) Soccerway
Rules for classification: 1) Points; 2) Head-to-head points; 3) Head-to-head goal difference; 4) Head-to-head goals scored; 5) Goal difference; 6) Goals scored; 7) Play-off.

==== Results summary ====
Overall								Home						Away					
Pld	W	D	L	GF	GA	GD	Pts	W	D	L	GF	GA	GD	W	D	L	GF	GA	GD
0	0	0	0	0	0	0	0	0	0	0	0	0	0	0	0	0	0	0	0

==== Results by round ====
Round	1	2	3	4	5	6	7	8	9	10	11
Ground	H	A	H	A	H	H	A	H	A	H	A
Result	D	W	D	L	W	W	W	D	D	L	D
Position											

A = Away; H = Home; W = Win; D = Draw; L = Loss

==== Matches ====
18 July 2021 1	UTA Arad	0–0	Farul Constanţa	Arad
				Stadium: Francisc von Neuman Stadium

23 July 2021 2	Argeș Pitești	0–1	UTA Arad	Piteşti
				Stadium: Stadionul Nicolae Dobrin

1 August 2021 3	UTA Arad	1–1	FCSB	Arad
				Stadium: Francisc von Neuman Stadium

6 August 2021 4	Botoșani	2–1	UTA Arad

14 August 2021 5	UTA Arad	1–0	Universitatea Craiova	Arad
				Stadium: Francisc von Neuman Stadium

22 August 2021 6	UTA Arad	2–0	Voluntari	Arad
				Stadium: Francisc von Neuman Stadium

30 August 2021 7	Gaz Metan Mediaş	0–1	UTA Arad

10 September 2021 8	UTA Arad	2–2	Rapid Bucureşti	Arad
				Stadium: Francisc von Neuman Stadium

19 September 2021 9	Sepsi	0–0	UTA Arad

26 September 2021 10	UTA Arad	0–1	CFR Cluj	Arad
				Stadium: Francisc von Neuman Stadium

2 October 2021 11	Dinamo Bucureşti	2–2	UTA Arad

17 October 2021 12	UTA Arad	1–0	FC U Craiova 1948	Arad
				Stadium: Francisc von Neuman Stadium

25 October 2021 13	Academica Clinceni	0–3	UTA Arad

1 November 2021 14	UTA Arad	0–2	Chindia Târgoviște	Arad
				Stadium: Francisc von Neuman Stadium

6 November 2021 15	CS Mioveni	0–0	UTA Arad

6 November 2021 16	Farul Constanța	0–0	UTA Arad

27 November 2021 17	UTA Arad	0–1	Argeș Pitești	Arad
				Stadium: Francisc von Neuman Stadium

5 December 2021 18	FCSB	2–1	UTA Arad	Bucharest

11 December 2021 19	UTA Arad	0–0	Botoșani	Arad
				Stadium: Francisc von Neuman Stadium

14 December 2021 20	Universitatea Craiova	0–0	UTA Arad	Craiova
20:30

17 December 2021 21	Voluntari	2–1	UTA Arad	Voluntari
20:30				Stadium: Anghel Iordănescu Stadium

23 January 2022 22	UTA Arad	0–1	Gaz Metan Mediaş	Arad
17:00				Stadium: Francisc von Neuman Stadium; Referee: George Găman

29 January 2022 23	Rapid Bucureşti	1–1	UTA Arad	Bucharest
20:00				Stadium: Arena Naţională; Referee: Radu Petrescu

5 February 2022 24	UTA Arad	1–0	Sepsi OSK	Arad
				Stadium: Francisc von Neuman Stadium

8 February 2022 25	CFR Cluj	0–0	UTA Arad	Cluj-Napoca

13 February 2022 26	UTA Arad	0–0	Dinamo Bucureşti	Arad
				Stadium: Francisc von Neuman Stadium

18 February 2022 27	FC U Craiova 1948	1–1	UTA Arad	Craiova

25 February 2022 28	UTA Arad	2–0	Academica Clinceni	Arad
				Stadium: Francisc von Neuman Stadium

1 March 2022 29	Chindia Târgoviște	1–0	UTA Arad	Târgoviște

5 March 2022 30	UTA Arad	2–1	Mioveni	Arad
				Stadium: Francisc von Neuman Stadium

==== Play-out round ====
Pos	Team	Pld	W	D	L	GF	GA	GD	Pts	Qualification or relegation
7	Sepsi OSK (Q)	9	7	1	1	21	4	+17	42	Qualification to Europa Conference League second qualifying round (Note: Sepsi OSK qualified for the 2022–23 UEFA Europa Conference League by winning the 2021–22 Cupa României.)
8	Botoșani	9	6	0	3	18	9	+9	41	Qualification to European competition play-offs
9	Rapid București	9	6	1	2	22	7	+15	39	
10	FC U Craiova 1948	9	5	2	2	14	11	+3	34	
11	UTA Arad	9	4	1	4	10	6	+4	33	
12	Mioveni	9	5	1	3	12	10	+2	31	
13	Chindia Târgoviște (O)	9	2	2	5	8	8	0	26	Qualification for the relegation play-offs
14	Dinamo București (R)	9	4	2	3	14	11	+3	23	Qualification for the relegation play-offs
15	Academica Clinceni (Note: Academica were deducted 44 points due to financial reasons. They later dissolved and restarted under a new name called HD Clinceni 2022.) (D, R)	9	0	0	9	4	32	−28	−43	Clubs withdrew from the league
16	Gaz Metan Mediaș (Note: Gaz Metan Mediaș were deducted 50 points due to financial reasons. They later withdrew and completed under the name of ACS Mediaș 2022.) (D, R)	9	1	0	8	6	31	−25	−46	Clubs withdrew from the league

Source: Soccerway, FRF (in Romanian), LPF (in Romanian)
Rules for classification: 1) Points; 2) Points without rounding; 3) Points in the regular season; 4) Goal difference; 5) Goals scored; 6) Play-off (only if needed to decide teams for relegation). (Note: only criteria 4 and 5 are applied to establish the classification during the competition.)
(D) Disqualified; (O) Play-off winners; (Q) Qualified for the phase indicated; (R) Relegated

==== Results summary ====
Overall								Home						Away					
Pld	W	D	L	GF	GA	GD	Pts	W	D	L	GF	GA	GD	W	D	L	GF	GA	GD
9	4	1	4	10	6	+4	13	4	0	1	9	2	+7	0	1	3	1	4	−3

==== Matches ====
11 March 2022 1	UTA Arad	3–0	Academica Clinceni	Arad
				Stadium: Francisc von Neuman Stadium

18 March 2022 2	Botoșani	1–0	UTA Arad	Botoșani
17:30				Stadium: Municipal Stadium

2 April 2022 3	UTA Arad	4–0	Gaz Metan Mediaş	Arad
				Stadium: Francisc von Neuman Stadium

9 April 2022 4	UTA Arad	0–2	Rapid Bucureşti	Arad
				Stadium: Francisc von Neuman Stadium

16 April 2022 5	Sepsi OSK	1–0	UTA Arad	Sfântu Gheorghe
15:00	Bălașa 90+3'			Stadium: Sepsi Arena Stadium

23 April 2022 6	UTA Arad	1–0	Chindia Târgovişte	Arad
				Stadium: Francisc von Neuman Stadium

1 May 2022 7	FC U Craiova 1948	1–0	UTA Arad	Craiova
19:00	Kovačić 50'			Stadium: Ion Oblemenco Stadium

7 May 2022 8	UTA Arad	1–0	Mioveni	Arad
				Stadium: Francisc von Neuman Stadium

13 May 2022 9	Dinamo Bucureşti	1–1	UTA Arad	Bucharest
20:30				Stadium: Dinamo Stadium

=== Cupa României ===
23 September 2021	Filiași	1–0	UTA Arad	Filiași
16:00	Vîlcică 38'			Stadium: Stadionul Orășenesc Filiași; Referee: Robert Avram
