= 2022–23 Liga I =

105th season of the top-tier football league in Romania

Liga I
- Season: 2022–23
- Dates: 15 July 2022 – 1 June 2023
- Champions: Farul Constanța
- Relegated: Mioveni; Chindia Târgoviște; Argeș Pitești
- Champions League: Farul Constanța
- Europa Conference League: FCSB; Sepsi OSK; CFR Cluj
- Matches: 317
- Goals: 758 (2.39 per match)
- Top goalscorer: Marko Dugandžić (22 goals)
- Best goalkeeper: Mihai Popa; Marian Aioani (13 clean sheets)
- Biggest home win: Farul Constanța 8–0 Botoșani (4 December 2022)
- Biggest away win: Argeș Pitești 0–5 Sepsi OSK (5 November 2022)
- Highest scoring: Farul Constanța 7-2 Rapid București (6 May 2023)
- Longest winning run: 5 matches Farul Constanța; CFR Cluj; FCSB
- Longest unbeaten run: 14 matches Voluntari
- Longest winless run: 17 matches Argeș Pitești
- Longest losing run: 9 matches Mioveni
- Highest attendance: 42,439; FCSB 1–0 CFR Cluj (14 May 2023)
- Lowest attendance: 250; Voluntari 0–1 Botoșani (23 July 2022)
- Total attendance: 1,770,404
- Average attendance: 5,620
- All statistics correct as of 1 June 2023.

The 2022–23 Liga I (also known as Superliga for sponsorship reasons) was the 105th season of the Liga I, the top professional league for Romanian association football clubs. The season started on 16 July 2022 and ended in May 2023. It was the eighth season to take place since the play-off/play-out format has been introduced. Farul Constanța claimed the title, ending the five season domination of the Transylvanian side CFR Cluj.

After the conclusion of the regular season, teams will be divided according to their place to enter either the championship play-offs or the relegation play-outs.

The teams ranked 15th and 16th at the end of the play-out tournament will be directly relegated, while the 13th and 14th places played a promotion/relegation play-off against 3rd and 4th places from Liga II.

== Teams ==
The league consisted of 16 teams: 12 from the 2021–22 Liga I, two teams from the 2021–22 Liga II, and the winners of the 2021–22 promotion/relegation play-off.

Teams promoted to the Superliga

The first club to be promoted was Petrolul Ploiești, following their 2–0 win against Concordia Chiajna on 9 May 2022. Petrolul Ploiești returned to the Superliga after six years of absence.

The second club to be promoted was Hermannstadt, following their 0–0 draw against Steaua București on 15 May 2022. Hermannstadt returned to Liga I after only one year of absence.

The third club to be promoted was Universitatea Cluj, following their 1–1 draw against Dinamo București on 29 May 2022, in the promotion/relegation play-offs. Universitatea Cluj returned to Liga I after seven years of absence.

Teams relegated to the Liga II

The first club to be relegated was Gaz Metan Mediaș, which were relegated on 2 April 2022 following a 0–4 defeat against UTA Arad, ending their six-year stay in the top flight. Gaz Metan had severe financial problems and was repeatedly penalized, finally ending the season only with financial support from the Romanian Football Federation and the Romanian Professional Football League.

The second club to be relegated was Academica Clinceni, which were relegated on 8 April 2022 following their 0–3 defeat against Chindia Târgoviște, ending their three-year stay in the top flight. Academica had also severe financial problems and was repeatedly penalized, also being denied a license for the new season since March 2022.

The third club to be relegated was Dinamo București, which were relegated on 29 May 2022 following their 1–1 draw against Universitatea Cluj in the promotion/relegation play-offs, thus ending their 74-year stay in the top flight. Dinamo is the second most titled club in Romania and relegated for the first time in their history.

=== Venues ===
| FCSB | Universitatea Craiova | FCU 1948 Craiova | Universitatea Cluj |
|---|---|---|---|
| Arena Națională | Ion Oblemenco | Ion Oblemenco | Cluj Arena |
| Capacity: 55,634 | Capacity: 30,929 | Capacity: 30,929 | Capacity: 30,201 |
| CFR Cluj | Petrolul Ploiești | Chindia Târgoviște | Argeș Pitești |
| Dr. Constantin Rădulescu | Ilie Oană | Eugen Popescu (Note: Chindia Târgoviște was relocated to Ilie Oană in Ploiești between round 1 and round 7 of the play-out, because Eugen Popescu Stadium in Târgoviște was under renovations.) | Nicolae Dobrin |
| Capacity: 23,500 | Capacity: 15,073 | Capacity: 8,400 | Capacity: 15,000 |
| Rapid București | 2022–23 Liga I (Romania) Location of Bucharest / Ilfov County teams. | | UTA Arad |
| Rapid | 2022–23 Liga I (Romania) Location of Bucharest / Ilfov County teams. | | Francisc von Neuman |
| Capacity: 14,047 | 2022–23 Liga I (Romania) Location of Bucharest / Ilfov County teams. | | Capacity: 12,700 |
| Mioveni | 2022–23 Liga I (Romania) Location of Bucharest / Ilfov County teams. | | Sepsi OSK |
| Orășenesc | 2022–23 Liga I (Romania) Location of Bucharest / Ilfov County teams. | | Sepsi Arena |
| Capacity: 10,000 | 2022–23 Liga I (Romania) Location of Bucharest / Ilfov County teams. | | Capacity: 8,400 |
| Hermannstadt | Botoșani | Voluntari | Farul Constanța |
| Municipal (Sibiu) | Municipal (Botoșani) | Anghel Iordănescu | Viitorul |
| Capacity: 13,013 | Capacity: 7,782 | Capacity: 4,600 | Capacity: 4,554 |

=== Personnel and kits ===
Note: Flags indicate national team as has been defined under FIFA eligibility rules. Players and Managers may hold more than one non-FIFA nationality.

| Team | Manager | Captain | Kit manufacturer | Shirt sponsor |
|---|---|---|---|---|
| Argeș Pitești | (Romania) Bogdan Vintilă | (Romania) Costinel Tofan | Macron | Getica 95 |
| Botoșani | (Romania) Flavius Stoican | (Romania) Victor Dican | Adidas | Trutzi, Elsaco |
| CFR Cluj | (Romania) Dan Petrescu | (Romania) Mário Camora | Nike | eToro |
| Chindia Târgoviște | (Romania) Anton Petrea | (Romania) Cristian Neguț | Joma | Gias Grafit XPS |
| Farul Constanța | (Romania) Gheorghe Hagi | (Romania) Ionuț Larie | Nike | Petrom |
| FCSB | (Cyprus) Elias Charalambous | (Romania) Darius Olaru | Nike | Betano |
| FCU 1948 Craiova | (Italy) Nicolò Napoli | (Argentina) Juan Bauza | Adidas | Craiova Cetatea Banilor |
| Hermannstadt | (Romania) Marius Măldărășanu | (Romania) Petrișor Petrescu | Nike | Unibet |
| Mioveni | (Romania) Nicolae Dica | (Romania) Adrian Scarlatache | Macron | - |
| Petrolul Ploiești | (Romania) Florin Pârvu | (Romania) Valentin Țicu | Adidas | MRS Residence, La Cocoș |
| Rapid București | (Romania) Adrian Mutu | (Romania) Cristian Săpunaru | Nike | Superbet, Mobexpert |
| Sepsi OSK | (Italy) Cristiano Bergodi | (Romania) Roland Niczuly | Adidas | Diószegi, Gyermelyi |
| Universitatea Cluj | (Romania) Ioan Sabău | (Romania) Alexandru Chipciu | Adidas | Superbet, IRUM, De'Longhi |
| Universitatea Craiova | (Romania) Eugen Neagoe | (Romania) Nicușor Bancu | Puma | Betano |
| UTA Arad | (Romania) Mircea Rednic | (Romania) Alexandru Benga | Saller | Efbet |
| Voluntari | (Romania) Liviu Ciobotariu | (Moldova) Igor Armaș | Nike | Metropola TV |

=== Managerial changes ===
| Team | Outgoing manager | Manner of departure | Date of vacancy | Position in table | Incoming manager | Date of appointment |
|---|---|---|---|---|---|---|
| UTA Arad | (Romania) Ionuț Badea | End of contract | 31 May 2022 | Pre-season | (Romania) Ilie Poenaru | 2 June 2022 |
| Chindia Târgoviște | (Romania) Emil Săndoi | Mutual agreement | 31 May 2022 | Pre-season | (Romania) Adrian Mihalcea | 7 June 2022 |
| FCU 1948 Craiova | (Italy) Nicolò Napoli | End of contract | 31 May 2022 | Pre-season | (Romania) Marius Croitoru | 23 June 2022 |
| Botoșani | (Romania) Marius Croitoru | Mutual agreement | 7 June 2022 | Pre-season | (Romania) Mihai Teja | 9 June 2022 |
| Universitatea Craiova | (Romania) Laurențiu Reghecampf | Mutual agreement | 12 June 2022 | Pre-season | (Romania) László Balint | 13 June 2022 |
| FCSB | (Romania) Anton Petrea | Resigned | 25 July 2022 | 12th | (Romania) Nicolae Dică | 26 July 2022 |
| Universitatea Craiova | (Romania) László Balint | Sacked | 9 August 2022 | 9th | (Romania) Mirel Rădoi | 9 August 2022 |
| Mioveni | (Romania) Alexandru Pelici | Sacked | 23 August 2022 | 16th | (Romania) Flavius Stoican | 23 August 2022 |
| Universitatea Cluj | (Romania) Erik Lincar | Resigned | 25 August 2022 | 15th | (Romania) Eugen Neagoe | 25 August 2022 |
| Chindia Târgoviște | (Romania) Adrian Mihalcea | Resigned | 20 September 2022 | 16th | (Romania) Anton Petrea | 21 September 2022 |
| FCU 1948 Craiova | (Romania) Marius Croitoru | Sacked | 10 October 2022 | 11th | (Italy) Nicolo Napoli | 9 November 2022 |
| Argeș Pitești | (Romania) Andrei Prepeliță | Sacked | 24 October 2022 | 11th | (Romania) Marius Croitoru | 26 October 2022 |
| UTA Arad | (Romania) Ilie Poenaru | Sacked | 1 November 2022 | 15th | (Romania) László Balint | 1 November 2022 |
| FCSB | (Romania) Nicolae Dică | Resigned | 1 November 2022 | 7th | (Romania) Leonard Strizu | 30 November 2022 |
| Mioveni | (Romania) Flavius Stoican | Sacked | 1 November 2022 | 16th | (Romania) Nicolae Dică | 14 January 2023 |
| Botoșani | (Romania) Mihai Teja | Resigned | 10 November 2022 | 12th | (Romania) Flavius Stoican | 10 December 2023 |
| Universitatea Craiova | (Romania) Mirel Rădoi | Resigned | 7 December 2022 | 5th | (Romania) Eugen Neagoe | 1 January 2023 |
| Universitatea Cluj | (Romania) Eugen Neagoe | Resigned | 1 January 2023 | 14th | (Romania) Ioan Ovidiu Sabău | 2 January 2023 |
| Petrolul Ploiești | (Romania) Nicolae Constantin | Resigned | 6 February 2023 | 7th | (Romania) Florin Pârvu | 7 February 2023 |
| Argeș Pitești | (Romania) Marius Croitoru | Resigned | 7 March 2023 | 15th | (Romania) Bogdan Vintilă | 15 March 2023 |
| FCSB | (Romania) Leonard Strizu | Resigned | 3 March 2023 | 3rd | (Cyprus) Elias Charalambous | 30 March 2023 |
| UTA Arad | (Romania) László Balint | Sacked | 25 April 2022 | 14th | (Romania) Mircea Rednic | 25 April 2023 |

== Regular season ==
In the regular season the 16 teams will meet twice for a total of 30 matches per team, with the top 6 advancing to the Championship play-offs and the bottom 10 qualifying for the relegation play-outs.

=== Table ===
| Pos | Team | Pld | W | D | L | GF | GA | GD | Pts | Qualification |
|---|---|---|---|---|---|---|---|---|---|---|
| 1 | Farul Constanța | 30 | 19 | 7 | 4 | 54 | 28 | +26 | 64 | Qualification for the Play-off round |
| 2 | CFR Cluj | 30 | 20 | 3 | 7 | 54 | 28 | +26 | 63 | Qualification for the Play-off round |
| 3 | FCSB | 30 | 17 | 6 | 7 | 51 | 35 | +16 | 57 | Qualification for the Play-off round |
| 4 | Universitatea Craiova | 30 | 16 | 6 | 8 | 37 | 27 | +10 | 54 | Qualification for the Play-off round |
| 5 | Rapid București | 30 | 15 | 7 | 8 | 40 | 26 | +14 | 52 | Qualification for the Play-off round |
| 6 | Sepsi OSK | 30 | 11 | 9 | 10 | 47 | 30 | +17 | 42 | Qualification for the Play-off round |
| 7 | FCU 1948 Craiova | 30 | 11 | 7 | 12 | 34 | 33 | +1 | 40 | Qualification for the Play-out round |
| 8 | Petrolul Ploiești | 30 | 11 | 3 | 16 | 28 | 44 | −16 | 36 | Qualification for the Play-out round |
| 9 | Universitatea Cluj | 30 | 8 | 10 | 12 | 25 | 37 | −12 | 34 (Note: Head to head points: Universitatea Cluj 4, Voluntari 1) | Qualification for the Play-out round |
| 10 | Voluntari | 30 | 8 | 10 | 12 | 28 | 32 | −4 | 34 | Qualification for the Play-out round |
| 11 | Botoșani | 30 | 7 | 11 | 12 | 29 | 44 | −15 | 32 (Note: Head to head points: Botoșani 6, Chindia 5, Hermannstadt 3) | Qualification for the Play-out round |
| 12 | Chindia Târgoviște | 30 | 7 | 11 | 12 | 32 | 42 | −10 | 32 | Qualification for the Play-out round |
| 13 | Hermannstadt (Note: Hermannstadt was deposed with 9 points due to financial debts.) | 30 | 11 | 8 | 11 | 30 | 29 | +1 | 32 | Qualification for the Play-out round |
| 14 | Argeș Pitești | 30 | 6 | 9 | 15 | 21 | 41 | −20 | 27 (Note: Head to head points: Arges 6, UTA 0) | Qualification for the Play-out round |
| 15 | UTA Arad | 30 | 6 | 9 | 15 | 29 | 41 | −12 | 27 | Qualification for the Play-out round |
| 16 | Mioveni | 30 | 4 | 10 | 16 | 23 | 45 | −22 | 22 | Qualification for the Play-out round |

Source: LPF (in Romanian) Soccerway
Rules for classification: 1) Points; 2) Head-to-head points; 3) Head-to-head goal difference; 4) Head-to-head goals scored; 5) Goal difference; 6) Goals scored; 7) Play-off.

=== Results ===
| Home \ Away | ARG | BOT | CFR | CHI | FAR | FCS | FCU | HER | MIO | PET | RAP | SPS | UCJ | UCV | UTA | VOL |
|---|---|---|---|---|---|---|---|---|---|---|---|---|---|---|---|---|
| Argeș Pitești | | 0–2 | 0–1 | 2–1 | 0–0 | 1–2 | 0–2 | 0–1 | 2–2 | 0–1 | 1–1 | 0–5 | 3–1 | 1–0 | 2–0 | 0–0 |
| Botoșani | 0–0 | | 1–1 | 3–2 | 1–1 | 2–3 | 1–0 | 0–0 | 1–1 | 5–0 | 1–2 | 1–1 | 1–1 | 1–0 | 1–2 | 0–1 |
| CFR Cluj | 3–1 | 0–1 | | 2–0 | 1–3 | 0–1 | 3–1 | 0–1 | 4–2 | 1–0 | 1–0 | 2–1 | 4–0 | 2–0 | 2–1 | 4–0 |
| Chindia Târgoviște | 1–1 | 2–2 | 0–2 | | 1–1 | 0–2 | 0–0 | 1–1 | 1–0 | 2–3 | 2–1 | 1–2 | 2–2 | 1–1 | 2–1 | 1–1 |
| Farul Constanța | 3–0 | 8–0 | 0–3 | 0–0 | | 3–1 | 2–1 | 0–0 | 2–1 | 2–0 | 2–1 | 2–0 | 2–0 | 2–1 | 2–0 | 2–1 |
| FCSB | 3–2 | 1–0 | 0–1 | 3–2 | 2–3 | | 1–1 | 2–2 | 5–1 | 4–1 | 3–1 | 1–0 | 1–1 | 1–1 | 2–1 | 1–1 |
| FCU 1948 Craiova | 1–0 | 1–0 | 3–1 | 0–1 | 1–2 | 0–2 | | 1–1 | 2–1 | 0–1 | 1–0 | 1–0 | 5–0 | 1–2 | 1–1 | 2–1 |
| Hermannstadt | 1–1 | 1–1 | 2–3 | 0–1 | 4–0 | 0–1 | 1–0 | | 3–0 | 2–1 | 0–2 | 1–2 | 0–1 | 1–0 | 0–0 | 2–1 |
| Mioveni | 0–1 | 0–0 | 0–1 | 2–0 | 0–2 | 1–1 | 2–2 | 0–2 | | 1–0 | 0–0 | 1–1 | 0–1 | 0–1 | 1–1 | 0–3 |
| Petrolul Ploiești | 2–0 | 2–1 | 2–5 | 1–2 | 1–3 | 0–2 | 1–1 | 2–0 | 0–0 | | 1–0 | 1–1 | 2–0 | 0–1 | 2–1 | 0–1 |
| Rapid București | 2–1 | 1–1 | 2–1 | 2–0 | 1–1 | 2–0 | 1–2 | 0–1 | 2–1 | 3–1 | | 3–0 | 1–0 | 2–2 | 1–0 | 4–1 |
| Sepsi OSK | 4–0 | 7–0 | 2–2 | 2–2 | 0–1 | 0–1 | 4–0 | 2–1 | 0–1 | 2–0 | 1–2 | | 2–1 | 0–1 | 0–0 | 1–1 |
| Universitatea Cluj | 1–1 | 2–0 | 1–2 | 1–0 | 2–0 | 2–1 | 1–1 | 1–0 | 2–2 | 0–1 | 0–0 | 0–1 | | 1–1 | 0–0 | 2–1 |
| Universitatea Craiova | 1–0 | 1–0 | 2–0 | 3–0 | 4–3 | 2–1 | 0–2 | 2–0 | 1–0 | 2–1 | 0–1 | 2–2 | 1–0 | | 2–1 | 1–1 |
| UTA Arad | 0–1 | 3–1 | 1–1 | 1–1 | 0–1 | 3–1 | 2–1 | 1–2 | 1–2 | 2–0 | 1–1 | 1–4 | 2–1 | 1–2 | | 1–1 |
| Voluntari | 0–0 | 0–1 | 0–1 | 0–3 | 1–1 | 1–2 | 1–0 | 3–0 | 3–1 | 0–1 | 0–1 | 0–0 | 0–0 | 1–0 | 3–0 | |

Source: LPF (in Romanian)
Legend: Blue = home team win; Yellow = draw; Red = away team win.

=== Positions by round ===
| Team ╲ Round | 1 | 2 | 3 | 4 | 5 | 6 | 7 | 8 | 9 | 10 | 11 | 12 | 13 | 14 | 15 | 16 | 17 | 18 | 19 | 20 | 21 | 22 | 23 | 24 | 25 | 26 | 27 | 28 | 29 | 30 |
|---|---|---|---|---|---|---|---|---|---|---|---|---|---|---|---|---|---|---|---|---|---|---|---|---|---|---|---|---|---|---|
| Farul Constanța | 4 | 1 | 1 | 4 | 3 | 1 | 1 | 1 | 2 | 1 | 1 | 1 | 1 | 1 | 1 | 1 | 1 | 1 | 1 | 1 | 1 | 2 | 2 | 1 | 1 | 1 | 1 | 1 | 1 | 1 |
| CFR Cluj | 5 | 9 | 5 | 1 | 4 | 2 | 4 | 3 | 3 | 2 | 2 | 2 | 2 | 2 | 2 | 2 | 2 | 2 | 2 | 2 | 2 | 1 | 1 | 2 | 2 | 2 | 2 | 2 | 2 | 2 |
| FCSB | 9 | 14 | 14 | 13 | 12 | 9 | 10 | 12 | 12 | 12 | 13 | 10 | 7 | 6 | 6 | 6 | 6 | 5 | 4 | 4 | 3 | 3 | 4 | 4 | 3 | 3 | 3 | 3 | 3 | 3 |
| Universitatea Craiova | 7 | 11 | 12 | 9 | 6 | 8 | 3 | 8 | 6 | 6 | 5 | 6 | 6 | 5 | 4 | 4 | 4 | 4 | 5 | 5 | 5 | 5 | 5 | 5 | 5 | 5 | 5 | 5 | 5 | 4 |
| Rapid București | 13 | 6 | 4 | 2 | 5 | 3 | 2 | 2 | 1 | 3 | 3 | 3 | 3 | 3 | 3 | 3 | 3 | 3 | 3 | 3 | 4 | 4 | 3 | 3 | 4 | 4 | 4 | 4 | 4 | 5 |
| Sepsi OSK | 7 | 3 | 7 | 6 | 7 | 5 | 8 | 10 | 11 | 9 | 7 | 5 | 5 | 7 | 8 | 9 | 8 | 8 | 7 | 7 | 6 | 6 | 6 | 6 | 6 | 6 | 6 | 6 | 7 | 6 |
| FCU 1948 Craiova | 12 | 5 | 9 | 10 | 8 | 11 | 13 | 11 | 10 | 8 | 9 | 8 | 12 | 13 | 12 | 14 | 14 | 15 | 13 | 10 | 10 | 10 | 12 | 10 | 8 | 7 | 7 | 7 | 6 | 7 |
| Petrolul Ploiești | 13 | 15 | 15 | 11 | 10 | 6 | 7 | 4 | 4 | 5 | 6 | 7 | 8 | 9 | 7 | 7 | 7 | 7 | 6 | 8 | 7 | 7 | 7 | 8 | 7 | 8 | 8 | 8 | 10 | 8 |
| Universitatea Cluj | 9 | 12 | 13 | 14 | 15 | 15 | 15 | 15 | 16 | 14 | 14 | 14 | 13 | 14 | 15 | 12 | 13 | 13 | 14 | 14 | 14 | 14 | 14 | 14 | 14 | 14 | 12 | 11 | 8 | 9 |
| Voluntari | 5 | 8 | 3 | 7 | 9 | 12 | 12 | 13 | 13 | 13 | 11 | 11 | 9 | 8 | 10 | 13 | 10 | 10 | 9 | 9 | 8 | 8 | 9 | 11 | 11 | 12 | 11 | 9 | 9 | 10 |
| Botoșani | 3 | 2 | 2 | 5 | 1 | 4 | 6 | 7 | 8 | 11 | 12 | 13 | 14 | 11 | 9 | 10 | 12 | 12 | 12 | 13 | 13 | 12 | 8 | 7 | 9 | 9 | 9 | 12 | 12 | 11 |
| Chindia Târgoviște | 11 | 13 | 11 | 15 | 14 | 14 | 14 | 14 | 15 | 16 | 16 | 15 | 15 | 15 | 13 | 11 | 9 | 9 | 11 | 12 | 12 | 13 | 10 | 9 | 10 | 10 | 10 | 10 | 11 | 12 |
| Hermannstadt | 1 | 4 | 8 | 3 | 2 | 7 | 9 | 5 | 5 | 4 | 4 | 4 | 4 | 4 | 5 | 5 | 5 | 6 | 8 | 6 | 9 | 9 | 11 | 12 | 13 | 11 | 13 | 13 | 13 | 13 |
| Argeș Pitești | 2 | 10 | 6 | 8 | 13 | 10 | 5 | 6 | 7 | 10 | 10 | 12 | 11 | 10 | 11 | 8 | 11 | 11 | 10 | 11 | 11 | 11 | 13 | 13 | 12 | 13 | 14 | 14 | 15 | 14 |
| UTA Arad | 15 | 7 | 10 | 12 | 11 | 13 | 11 | 9 | 9 | 7 | 8 | 9 | 10 | 12 | 14 | 15 | 15 | 14 | 15 | 15 | 15 | 15 | 15 | 15 | 15 | 15 | 15 | 15 | 14 | 15 |
| Mioveni | 16 | 16 | 16 | 16 | 16 | 16 | 16 | 16 | 14 | 15 | 15 | 16 | 16 | 16 | 16 | 16 | 16 | 16 | 16 | 16 | 16 | 16 | 16 | 16 | 16 | 16 | 16 | 16 | 16 | 16 |

| Leader and Qualification for the Play-off round |
| Qualification for the Play-off round |
| Qualification for the Play-out round |

Source: Soccerway

== Play-off round ==
The top six teams from the regular season will meet twice (10 matches per team) for places in 2023–24 UEFA Champions League and 2023–24 UEFA Europa Conference League as well as deciding the league champion. Teams start the championship round with their points from the regular season halved, rounded upwards, and no other records carried over from the regular season.

=== Play-off table ===
| Pos | Team | Pld | W | D | L | GF | GA | GD | Pts | Qualification | FAR | FCS | CFR | CRA | RAP | SPS |
|---|---|---|---|---|---|---|---|---|---|---|---|---|---|---|---|---|
| 1 | Farul Constanța (C) | 10 | 6 | 3 | 1 | 22 | 13 | +9 | 53 | Qualification to Champions League first qualifying round | | 3–2 | 1–0 | 3–2 | 7–2 | 2–1 |
| 2 | FCSB | 10 | 5 | 2 | 3 | 15 | 15 | 0 | 46 | Qualification to Europa Conference League second qualifying round | 2–1 | | 1–0 | 1–1 | 1–5 | 3–1 |
| 3 | CFR Cluj (O) | 10 | 2 | 4 | 4 | 11 | 14 | −3 | 42 | Qualification to European competition play-offs | 1–2 | 1–1 | | 1–1 | 2–2 | 2–1 |
| 4 | Universitatea Craiova | 10 | 3 | 4 | 3 | 15 | 14 | +1 | 40 | | 1–1 | 1–2 | 1–1 | | 3–1 | 0–1 |
| 5 | Rapid București | 10 | 3 | 3 | 4 | 17 | 20 | −3 | 38 | | 1–1 | 1–0 | 3–1 | 2–3 | | 0–0 |
| 6 | Sepsi OSK (Note: Cup winner) | 10 | 2 | 2 | 6 | 10 | 14 | −4 | 29 | Qualification to Europa Conference League second qualifying round | 1–1 | 1–2 | 1–2 | 1–2 | 2–0 | |

Source: Soccerway, FRF (in Romanian), LPF (in Romanian)
Legend: Blue = home team win; Yellow = draw; Red = away team win.
Rules for classification: 1) Points; 2) Points without rounding; 3) Head-to-head points; 4) Head-to-head goal difference; 5) Head-to-head goals scored; 6) Goal difference; 7) Goals scored; 8) Play-off (only if needed to decide champion or teams for UEFA competitions). (Note: only criteria 6 and 7 are applied to establish the classification during the competition.)
(C) Champions; (O) Play-off winners

== Play-out round ==
The bottom ten teams from the regular season meet once to contest against relegation. Teams started the play-out round with their points from the Regular season halved, rounded upwards, and no other records carried over from the Regular season. The winner of the Relegation round finish 7th in the overall season standings, the second placed team – 8th, and so on, with the last placed team in the Relegation round being 16th.

=== Play-out table ===
| Pos | Team | Pld | W | D | L | GF | GA | GD | Pts | Qualification or relegation | FCU | PET | VOL | UCJ | HER | BOT | UTA | ARG | CHI | MIO |
|---|---|---|---|---|---|---|---|---|---|---|---|---|---|---|---|---|---|---|---|---|
| 7 | FCU 1948 Craiova | 9 | 4 | 4 | 1 | 13 | 7 | +6 | 36 | Qualification to European competition play-offs | | 0–1 | 3–3 | | | | | 2–1 | 1–0 | 3–0 |
| 8 | Petrolul Ploiești | 9 | 5 | 1 | 3 | 9 | 9 | 0 | 34 | ineligible for european competitions (Note: Petrolul Ploiești failed to obtain a UEFA licence.) | | | | 0–2 | 0–1 | 1–0 | 1–0 | | | 2–0 |
| 9 | Voluntari | 9 | 4 | 5 | 0 | 17 | 11 | +6 | 34 | Qualification to European competition play-offs | | 2–2 | | | 1–1 | 2–0 | 1–1 | | | 1–0 |
| 10 | Universitatea Cluj | 9 | 5 | 1 | 3 | 12 | 9 | +3 | 33 | | 1–3 | | 2–3 | | | | | 2–0 | 2–0 | 1–0 |
| 11 | Hermannstadt | 9 | 4 | 3 | 2 | 10 | 7 | +3 | 31 | | 0–0 | | | 1–2 | | 1–1 | | 2–1 | | |
| 12 | Botoșani | 9 | 4 | 3 | 2 | 10 | 5 | +5 | 31 | | 0–0 | | | 0–0 | | | | 1–0 | 1–0 | 5–1 |
| 13 | UTA Arad (O) | 9 | 3 | 3 | 3 | 10 | 9 | +1 | 26 | Qualification for the relegation play-offs | 1–1 | | | 2–0 | 1–0 | 0–2 | | | | |
| 14 | Argeș Pitești (R) | 9 | 3 | 1 | 5 | 10 | 11 | −1 | 24 | Qualification for the relegation play-offs | | 3–0 | 0–2 | | | | 2–2 | | 1–0 | |
| 15 | Chindia Târgoviște (R) | 9 | 2 | 1 | 6 | 7 | 12 | −5 | 23 | Relegation to Liga II | | 1–2 | 2–2 | | 1–2 | | 2–1 | | | |
| 16 | Mioveni (R) | 9 | 0 | 0 | 9 | 1 | 19 | −18 | 11 | Relegation to Liga II | | | | | 0–2 | | 0–2 | 0–2 | 0–1 | |

Source: Soccerway, FRF (in Romanian), LPF (in Romanian)
Legend: Blue = home team win; Yellow = draw; Red = away team win.
Rules for classification: 1) Points; 2) Points without rounding; 3) Points in the regular season; 4) Goal difference; 5) Goals scored; 6) Play-off (only if needed to decide teams for relegation). (Note: only criteria 4 and 5 are applied to establish the classification during the competition.)
(O) Play-off winners; (R) Relegated

== European play-offs ==
In the semi-final, the 7th and 8th-placed teams of the Liga I typically play a one-legged match on the ground of the better placed team (7th place). In the final, the winner of the play-out semi-final will play the highest ranked team of the play-off tournament that did not already qualify for European competitions. The winner of the final will enter the second qualifying round of the 2023–24 UEFA Europa Conference League.

=== European play-off semi-final ===
| 26 May 2023 | FCU 1948 Craiova | 3–3 (a.e.t.) (5–4 p) | Voluntari | Craiova |
| 20:00 EEST (UTC+3) | Chițu 36', 63'; Baeten 60' | | Aliji 78'; Sigurjonsson 85' (pen.); Dumiter 90+7' | Stadium: Stadionul Ion Oblemenco; Referee: Horațiu Feșnic |
| | Penalties |
| | Duarte (penalty scored); Baeten (penalty scored); Asamoah (penalty missed); Sidibe (penalty scored); Zanfir (penalty scored); Ganea (penalty scored) | | (penalty scored) Sigurjonsson; (penalty scored) Răduț; (penalty missed) Armaș; (penalty scored) Matricardi; (penalty scored) Dumiter; (penalty missed) Paz |

=== European play-off final ===
| 1 June 2023 | CFR Cluj | 1–0 (a.e.t.) | FCU 1948 Craiova | Cluj-Napoca |
| 20:30 EEST (UTC+3) | Kolinger 97' | | | Stadium: Stadionul Dr. Constantin Rădulescu; Referee: István Kovács |

== Promotion/relegation play-offs ==
The 13th and 14th-placed teams of the Liga I faced the 3rd and 4th-placed teams of the Liga II.

| Team 1 | Agg. | Team 2 | 1st leg | 2nd leg |
|---|---|---|---|---|
| Gloria Buzău | 1–5 | UTA Arad | 0–0 | 1–5 |
| Dinamo București | 8–5 | Argeș Pitești | 6–1 | 2–4 |

First leg

| 28 May 2023 | Gloria Buzău | 0–0 | UTA Arad | Buzău |
| 14:00 EEST (UTC+3) | | Report | | Stadium: Municipal; Attendance: 4,500; Referee: Andrei Chivulete (București) |

| 29 May 2023 | Dinamo București | 6–1 | Argeș Pitești | București |
| 20:00 EEST (UTC+3) | Quentin Bena 15'; Gorka Larrucea 24'; Alexandru Pop 28'; Lamine Ghezali 40'; Dani Iglesias 56'; Lamine Ghezali 62' | Report | Mario Zebić 55' | Stadium: Arena Națională; Attendance: 25,000; Referee: Horațiu Feșnic (Cluj-Napoca) |

Second leg

| 4 June 2023 | UTA Arad | 5–1 | Gloria Buzău | Arad |
| 21:00 EEST (UTC+3) | Virgiliu Postolachi 16'; Andrei Chindriș 49'; Andrei Chindriș 65'; Virgiliu Postolachi 80'; Philip Otele 89' | Report | Valentin Alexandru; 68' | Stadium: Francisc von Neuman; Attendance: 11,000; Referee: Radu Petrescu (București) |

| 3 June 2023 | Argeș Pitești | 4–2 | Dinamo București | Mioveni |
| 21:00 EEST (UTC+3) | Costinel Tofan 14'; Antonio Jakoliš 15'; Arnold Garita 47'; Arnold Garita 51' | Report | Lamine Ghezali 40'; Alexandru Pop 60' | Stadium: Orășenesc; Attendance: 7,000; Referee: Sebastian Colțescu (Craiova) |

== Season statistics ==
=== Top scorers ===
As of 1 June 2023

| Rank | Player | Club | Goals |
|---|---|---|---|
| 1 | (Croatia) Marko Dugandžić | Rapid București | 22 |
| 2 | (Italy) Andrea Compagno | FCSB / FCU 1948 Craiova | 20 |
| 3 | (Romania) Sebastian Mailat | Botoșani | 16 |
| 4 | (Romania) Denis Alibec | Farul Constanța | 14 |
| 4 | (Romania) Andrei Ivan | Universitatea Craiova | 14 |
| 4 | (Romania) Daniel Paraschiv | Hermannstadt | 14 |
| 7 | (France) Paul-Arnold Garita | Argeș Pitești | 12 |
| 8 | (Moldova) Vitalie Damașcan | Voluntari | 11 |
| 8 | (Curaçao) Rangelo Janga | CFR Cluj | 11 |
| 8 | (Romania) Alexandru Tudorie | Sepsi OSK | 11 |

=== Hat-tricks ===
| Player | For | Against | Result | Date |
|---|---|---|---|---|
| (Romania) Doru Popadiuc | Chindia Târgoviște | Voluntari | 3–0 (A) | 22 October 2022 |
| (Romania) Denis Alibec | Farul Constanța | Botoșani | 8–0 (H) | 4 December 2022 |
| (Croatia) Marko Dugandžić | Rapid București | Sepsi OSK | 3–0 (H) | 20 January 2023 |
| (Croatia) Marko Dugandžić | Rapid București | Voluntari | 4–1 (H) | 4 February 2023 |
| (Romania) Aurelian Chițu | FCU 1948 Craiova | Universitatea Cluj | 3–1 (A) | 8 April 2023 |
| (Romania) Denis Alibec | Farul Constanța | Rapid București | 7–2 (H) | 6 May 2023 |

=== Top assists ===
As of 1 June 2023

| Rank | Player | Club | Assists |
|---|---|---|---|
| 1 | (Romania) Ciprian Deac | CFR Cluj | 11 |
| 2 | (Romania) Alexandru Ioniță | Rapid București | 10 |
| 3 | (Romania) Florinel Coman | FCSB | 9 |
| 4 | (Romania) Cristian Neguț | Chindia Târgoviște | 8 |
| 4 | (Romania) Denis Alibec | Farul Constanța | 8 |
| 6 | (Croatia) Adnan Aganović | Sepsi OSK | 7 |
| 6 | (Romania) Darius Olaru | FCSB | 7 |
| 6 | (France) Yassine Bahassa | FCU 1948 Craiova | 7 |
| 9 | (Romania) Octavian Popescu | FCSB | 6 |
| 9 | (Romania) Marius Ștefănescu | Sepsi OSK | 6 |
| 9 | (Argentina) Juan Bauza | FCU 1948 Craiova | 6 |
| 9 | (Romania) Cristian Manea | CFR Cluj | 6 |
| 9 | (Romania) Constantin Budescu | Petrolul Ploiești | 6 |

=== Clean sheets ===
As of 1 June 2023

| Rank | Player | Club | Clean sheets |
|---|---|---|---|
| 1 | (Romania) Mihai Popa | Voluntari | 13 |
| 1 | (Romania) Mihai Aioani | Farul Constanța | 13 |
| 3 | (Romania) Horațiu Moldovan | Rapid București | 12 |
| 4 | (Romania) Andrei Gorcea | Universitatea Cluj | 11 |
| 4 | (Romania) Roland Niczuly | Sepsi OSK | 11 |
| 6 | (Romania) Octavian Vâlceanu | Petrolul Ploiești | 10 |
| 6 | (Croatia) Karlo Letica | Hermannstadt | 10 |
| 8 | (Romania) Eduard Pap | Botoșani | 9 |
| 8 | (Romania) Ion Gurău | FCU 1948 Craiova | 9 |
| 8 | (Italy) Simone Scuffet | CFR Cluj | 9 |

== Champion squad ==
Farul Constanța

Goalkeepers: Mihai Aioani (39 / 0); Alexandru Buzbuchi (1 / 0).
Defenders: Rolandas Baravykas (Lithuania) (3 / 0); Kévin Boli (Ivory Coast) (13 / 0); Daniel Bîrzu (2 / 0); Radu Boboc (1 / 0); Andrei Borza (33 / 3); Jérémy Corinus (Martinique) (4 / 0); David Kiki (Benin) (38 / 1); Ionuț Larie (39 / 3); Mihai Popescu (30 / 1); Dan Sîrbu (30 / 0); Gustavo Marins (Brazil) (5 / 0); Sebastian Mladen (4 / 0); Romario Benzar (6 / 0).
Midfielders: Andrei Artean (40 / 3); Luca Banu (2 / 0); Tudor Băluță (32 / 6); Carlo Casap (29 / 1); Kevin Doukouré (Ivory Coast) (27 / 1); Constantin Grameni (39 / 6); Robert Ion (3 / 0); Dragoș Nedelcu (29 / 1); Nicolas Popescu (1 / 0); Eduard Radaslavescu (1 / 0).
Forwards: Denis Alibec (31 / 14); Luca Andronache (3 / 0); Adrian Mazilu (19 / 6); Vlad Morar (21 / 4); Louis Munteanu (29 / 10); Alexi Pitu (20 / 5); Enes Sali (19 / 2); Alexandru Stoian (1 / 0); Adrian Petre (3 / 2); Mateus Santos (Brazil) (13 / 2); Gabriel Torje (16 / 3).
(league appearances and goals listed in brackets)

Manager: Gheorghe Hagi.

== Awards ==
=== Gazeta Sporturilor Monthly Football Awards ===
Note: The website and the award are not affiliated with the country's top flight competition, the Liga I—instead, voters can also choose between Romanian players and coaches who are competing abroad.

==== Player of the Month ====
| Year | Month | Player | Nationality | Pos. | Team | Ref |
|---|---|---|---|---|---|---|
| 2022 | July | Marius Ștefănescu | Romania | FW | Sepsi OSK | |
| 2022 | August | Andrea Compagno | Italy | FW | FCU 1948 Craiova / FCSB | |
| 2022 | September | Baba Alhassan | Ghana | MF | Hermannstadt | |
| 2022 | October | Doru Popadiuc | Romania | MF | Chindia Târgoviște | |
| 2023 | February | Malcom Edjouma | France | MF | FCSB | |
| 2023 | March | Adrian Mazilu | Romania | FW | Farul Constanța | |
| 2023 | April | Florinel Coman | Romania | FW | FCSB | |
| 2023 | May | Tudor Băluță | Romania | MF | Farul Constanta | |

==== Manager of the Month ====
| Year | Month | Manager | Nationality | Team | Ref |
|---|---|---|---|---|---|
| 2022 | July | Cristiano Bergodi | Italy | Sepsi OSK | |
| 2022 | August | Gheorghe Hagi | Romania | Farul Constanța | |
| 2022 | September | Marius Măldărășanu | Romania | Hermannstadt | |
| 2022 | October | Gheorghe Hagi (2) | Romania | Farul Constanța | |
| 2023 | February | Gheorghe Hagi (3) | Romania | Farul Constanța | |
| 2023 | March | Dan Petrescu | Romania | CFR Cluj | |
| 2023 | April | Gheorghe Hagi (4) | Romania | Farul Constanța | |
| 2023 | May | Gheorghe Hagi (5) | Romania | Farul Constanța | |

=== Annual awards ===
| Award | Winner | Club |
|---|---|---|
| Liga I Manager of the Season | (Romania) Gheorghe Hagi | Farul Constanța |
| Liga I Player of the Season | (Romania) Denis Alibec | Farul Constanța |

=== Liga I Team of the Season ===

Liga I Team of the 2022–23 Season – Liga Profesionistă de Fotbal

== Attendances ==
| # | Club | Average | Highest |
|---|---|---|---|
| 1 | FCSB | 15,485 | 42,439 |
| 2 | Universitatea Craiova | 11,195 | 28,000 |
| 3 | Rapid București | 11,054 | 13,800 |
| 4 | UTA Arad | 7,793 | 12,500 |
| 5 | Petrolul Ploiești | 6,310 | 14,500 |
| 6 | Universitatea Cluj | 5,974 | 24,500 |
| 7 | FCU 1948 Craiova | 5,307 | 23,211 |
| 8 | CFR Cluj | 5,089 | 15,000 |
| 9 | Hermannstadt | 3,826 | 10,722 |
| 10 | Sepsi OSK | 3,818 | 8,000 |
| 11 | Farul Constanța | 3,031 | 4,500 |
| 12 | Argeș Pitești | 2,818 | 7,500 |
| 13 | Chindia Târgoviște | 2,200 | 8,000 |
| 14 | Mioveni | 1,956 | 5,850 |
| 15 | Botoșani | 1,540 | 5,268 |
| 16 | Voluntari | 663 | 3,500 |
