= 2024–25 CFR Cluj season =

CFR Cluj
2024–25 season
- Manager: Dan Petrescu
- Stadium: Dr. Constantin Rădulescu Stadium
- Liga I: 2nd
- Cupa României: Winners
- UEFA Conference League: Play-off round
- Top goalscorer: League: Louis Munteanu (22); All: Louis Munteanu (24)
- Highest home attendance: 11,152 vs FCSB
Home colours	Away colours	Third colours

The 2024–25 season was the 117th season in the history of CFR Cluj, and the club's 21st consecutive season in Liga I. In addition to the domestic league, the team participated in the Cupa României and the UEFA Conference League.

On 14 May 2025, Cluj defeated Hermannstadt in the 2025 Cupa României final.

== Transfers ==
=== In ===
Pos.	Player	Transferred from	Fee	Date	Source
DF	(Croatia) Anton Krešić	(Croatia) HNK Rijeka	€400,000	1 July 2024	
MF	(Liberia) Mohammed Kamara	(Israel) Hapoel Haifa	Free	1 July 2024	
MF	(Romania) Andrei Artean	(Cyprus) Apollon Limassol	Free	1 July 2024	
MF	(The Gambia) Kalifa Kujabi	(Italy) Frosinone	Free	1 July 2024	
DF	(Portugal) Simão Rocha	(Portugal) Paços de Ferreira	Free	1 July 2024	
MF	(Romania) Adrian Păun	(Israel) Hapoel Be'er Sheva	Free	1 July 2024	
DF	(Kosovo) Armend Thaqi	(Kosovo) FC Ballkani	Free	1 July 2024	
MF	(France) Béni Nkololo	(Saudi Arabia) Al-Orobah	Free	4 July 2024	
FW	(Moldova) Virgiliu Postolachi	(France) Grenoble Foot 38	€200,000	25 July 2024	
FW	(Romania) Louis Munteanu	(Italy) Fiorentina	€2,500,000	31 July 2024	

=== Out ===
Pos.	Player	Transferred to	Fee	Date	Source
GK	(Romania) Cătălin Căbuz	(Romania) FC Hermannstadt	€50,000	1 July 2024	
MF	(Italy) Filippo Falco		Contract termination	1 July 2024	
DF	(Romania) Cristian Manea	(Romania) Rapid București	End of contract	1 July 2024	
MF	(Morocco) Omar El Kaddouri		End of contract	1 July 2024	
MF	(Republic of the Congo) Durel Avounou	(Turkey) Çorum FK	Contract termination	29 July 2024	

== Pre-season and friendlies ==
26 June 2024 Friendly	Śląsk Wrocław	1–0	CFR Cluj	Ottensheim, Austria
17:00	Jezierski 18'

29 June 2024 Friendly	CFR Cluj	1–0	Slovan Bratislava	Windischgarsten, Austria
18:00	Păun 88' (pen.)			Stadium: Sportplatz Windischgarsten

2 July 2024 Friendly	LASK	1–1	CFR Cluj	Pasching, Austria
17:00	Safin 84'		Ilie 41'; Tachtsidis (yellow card) 69'	Stadium: voestalpine Stadium

9 July 2024 Friendly	CFR Cluj	1–0	Dumbrăvița
18:00 UTC+3	Păun 65'

13 February 2025 Friendly	CFR Cluj	2-0	FC Voluntari	Cluj-Napoca, Romania
13:00 UTC+2	Name 31'; Postolachi 53'			Stadium: Dr. Constantin Rădulescu Stadium

12 October 2024 Friendly	CFR Cluj	2-0	Unirea Ungheni	Cluj-Napoca, Romania
11:00 UTC+3	Bolgado 34'; Kamara 74'

== Competitions ==
=== Overall record ===
Competition	First match	Last match	Starting round	Record							
Competition	First match	Last match	Starting round	Pld	W	D	L	GF	GA	GD	Win %
Liga I	14 July 2024		Matchday 1	5	2	1	2	10	9	+1	40.00
Cupa României				0	0	0	0	0	0	+0	—
UEFA Conference League	25 July 2024		Second qualifying round	4	3	1	0	7	0	+7	75.00
Total				9	5	2	2	17	9	+8	55.56

Last updated: 15 August 2024
Source: Soccerway

=== Liga I ===
==== League table ====
Pos	Team	Pld	W	D	L	GF	GA	GD	Pts	Advances
1	FCSB	30	15	11	4	43	24	+19	56	Qualification for play-off round
2	CFR Cluj	30	14	12	4	56	32	+24	54	Qualification for play-off round
3	Universitatea Craiova	30	14	10	6	45	28	+17	52 (Note: Ranked on head-to-head points: Universitatea Craiova (4); Universitatea Cluj (1).)	Qualification for play-off round
4	Universitatea Cluj	30	14	10	6	43	27	+16	52	Qualification for play-off round
5	Dinamo București	30	13	12	5	41	26	+15	51	Qualification for play-off round

Source: LPF (in Romanian)
Rules for classification: 1) Points; 2) Head-to-head points; 3) Head-to-head goal difference; 4) Head-to-head goals scored; 5) Goal difference; 6) Goals scored; 7) Play-off.

==== Results summary ====
Overall								Home						Away					
Pld	W	D	L	GF	GA	GD	Pts	W	D	L	GF	GA	GD	W	D	L	GF	GA	GD
30	14	12	4	56	32	+24	54	9	3	3	35	20	+15	5	9	1	21	12	+9

Last updated: 9 March 2025.
Source: soccerway

==== Results by round ====
Round	1	2	3	4	5	6	7	8	9	10	11	12	13	14	15	16	17	18	19	20	21	22	23	24	25	26	27	28	29	30
Ground	H	A	H	H	H	A	H	A	H	A	H	H	A	H	A	A	H	A	A	A	H	A	H	A	H	A	A	H	A	H
Result	W	D	L	L	W	W	W	W	D	D	L	W	D	D	W	D	D	W	L	D	W	D	W	D	W	W	D	W	D	W
Position	1	4	8	11	6	4	3	2	2	2	3	2	2	2	2	2	3	1	4	5	5	5	3	4	3	1	4	3	3	2

Updated to match(es) played on 9 March 2025. Source: worldfootball
A = Away; H = Home; W = Win; D = Draw; L = Loss; P = Postponed

==== Matches ====
The match schedule was released on 1 July 2024.

14 July 2024 1	CFR Cluj	3–2	Dinamo București	Cluj-Napoca
19:00 UTC+3	Deac 42' (pen.); Bîrligea 52', (yellow card) 58'; Kamara (yellow card) 66'; Tachtsidis (yellow card) 84', (goal) 90+3'		Cîrjan 14'; Abdallah 34'; Politic (yellow card) 41'; Boateng (yellow card) 87'	Stadium: Dr. Constantin Rădulescu Stadium; Attendance: 7,756; Referee: Rareș Vidican

20 July 2024 2	Rapid București	2–2	CFR Cluj	Bucharest
22:00 UTC+3	Rrahmani 53' (pen.); Ignat (yellow card) 41'; Hasani 90+7'		Bîrligea 28'; Michael 75'	Stadium: Rapid-Giulești Stadium; Referee: István Kovács

28 July 2024 3	CFR Cluj	0–2	Universitatea Craiova	Cluj-Napoca
22:00 UTC+3	Kamara (yellow card) 29' (yellow-red card) 45'; Krešić (yellow card) 34'; Ajeti (yellow card) 66'		Vlădoiu (yellow card) 47'; Koljić 51'; Crețu (yellow card) 57'; Paradela (yellow card) 72'; Mitriță 90+5', (yellow card) 90+6'	Stadium: Dr. Constantin Rădulescu Stadium; Referee: Marcel Bîrsan

4 August 2024 4	CFR Cluj	2–3	Universitatea Cluj	Cluj-Napoca
22:00 UTC+3	Păun 24'; Michael 72'		Masoero 59'; Nistor 69' (pen.); Popescu 77'	Stadium: Dr. Constantin Rădulescu Stadium; Referee: Radu Petrescu

11 August 2024 5	CFR Cluj	3–0	Unirea Slobozia	Cluj-Napoca
22:00 UTC+3	Munteanu 38', 63'; Păun 52'			Stadium: Dr. Constantin Rădulescu Stadium; Referee: Andrei Chivulete

TBD 6	Oțelul Galați	v	CFR Cluj	Galați
				Stadium: Oțelul Stadium

25 August 2024 7	CFR Cluj	3–0	Botoșani	Cluj-Napoca
19:00 EEST	Munteanu (yellow card) 37'; Nkololo 52'; Đoković 70'; Filip 86'	Report	Álex Díez (yellow card) 30'; Matricardi (yellow card) 86'	Stadium: Dr. Constantin Rădulescu Stadium; Attendance: 4,000; Referee: (Romania) Robert Avram

1 September 2024 8	FCV Farul Constanța	0–3	CFR Cluj	Ovidiu
18:45 EEST	Dican (yellow card) 39'; Bălașa (yellow card) 40'; Vînă (yellow card) 53'	Report	Deac 27'; Kamara (yellow card) 42'; Munteanu (yellow card) 45+1'; Léo Bolgado 55'; Korenica 90+3'	Stadium: Central Stadium; Attendance: 2,200; Referee: (Romania) Sebastian Colțescu

15 September 2024 9	CFR Cluj	2–2	FCSB	Cluj-Napoca
21:00 EEST	Munteanu 36' 49'; Filip (yellow card) 90+3'; Postolachi (yellow card) 90+4'	Report	Pantea (yellow card) 35'; Băluță 59'; Dawa 87'	Stadium: Dr. Constantin Rădulescu Stadium; Attendance: 11,252; Referee: (Romania) Marian Barbu

21 September 2024 10	Hermannstadt	0–0	CFR Cluj	Sibiu
18:30 EEST	Robert Popescu (yellow card) 84'	Report	Kamara (yellow card) 87'	Stadium: Sibiu Municipal Stadium; Attendance: 6,639; Referee: (Romania) Adrian Cojocaru

28 September 2024 11	CFR Cluj	1–3	UTA Arad	Cluj-Napoca
19:00 EEST	Simão Rocha (yellow card) 44'; Tachtsidis 48' (yellow card) 56'; Boben (yellow card) 52'; Fică (yellow card) 56'; Đoković (yellow card) 71'	Report	Costache 12' (yellow card) 51'; Omondi 64'; Kadiri 78'	Stadium: Dr. Constantin Rădulescu Stadium; Attendance: 5,480; Referee: (Romania) Radu Petrescu

5 October 2024 12	CFR Cluj	2–1	Politehnica Iași	Cluj-Napoca
19:00 EET	Kamara 10' (yellow card) 36' (yellow-red card) 76'; Munteanu 16'	Report	Bordeianu 88' (pen.)	Stadium: Dr. Constantin Rădulescu Stadium; Attendance: 5,600; Referee: (Romania) Bogdan Dumitrache

19 October 2024 13	Petrolul Ploiești	0–0	CFR Cluj	Ploiești
21:00 EET	Jyry (yellow card) 59'; Hanca (yellow card) 70'; Papp (yellow card) 88'	Report	Michael (yellow card) 40'; Munteanu (yellow card) 74'	Stadium: Ilie Oană Stadium; Attendance: 4,300; Referee: (Romania) Marcel Bîrsan

25 October 2024 14	CFR Cluj	3–3	Sepsi	Cluj-Napoca
21:00 EET	Kamara 52'; Simão Rocha (yellow card) 66'; Postolachi 86' 90+3'	Report	Coman 37'; Ciobotariu 55'; Alimi (yellow card) 58'; Ștefan 83'; Dumitrescu (yellow card) 89'	Stadium: Dr. Constantin Rădulescu Stadium; Attendance: 3,700; Referee: (Romania) George Găman

=== Cupa României ===
==== Group stage ====
Pos	Team	Pld	W	D	L	GF	GA	GD	Pts	Qualification	CFR	RAP	BOT	AFU	CEA	ARG
1	CFR Cluj	3	2	1	0	6	3	+3	7	Advance to knockout phase	—	—	—	—	2–1	—
2	Rapid București	3	2	0	1	5	2	+3	6	Advance to knockout phase	0–2	—	—	—	—	—
3	Botoșani	3	2	0	1	4	2	+2	6		—	0–2	—	—	—	—
4	Afumați	3	1	1	1	2	3	−1	4		—	0–3	—	—	0–0	2–0
5	Ceahlăul Piatra Neamț	3	0	1	2	1	3	−2	1		1–2	—	0–1	—	—	—
6	Argeș Pitești	3	0	1	2	2	7	−5	1		2–2	—	0–3	—	—	—

Source: FRF
Legend: Blue = home team win; Yellow = draw; Red = away team win.

29 October 2024 1	FC Argeș	2–2	CFR Cluj	Mioveni
21:00 EET (UTC+02)	Borța 7'; Morar 76' (pen.)	Report	Mogoș 33'; Abeid 44'	Stadium: Orășenesc; Referee: George Cătălin Roman

4 December 2024 2	Ceahlăul Piatra Neamț	1–2	CFR Cluj	Piatra Neamț
14:00 EET (UTC+02)	Petre 54'	Report	Nkololo 17'; Korenica 67'	Stadium: Ceahlăul; Referee: Gabriel Mihuleac

19 December 2024 3	Rapid București	0–2	CFR Cluj	Bucharest
20:00 EET (UTC+02)		Report	Kamara 17'; Fică 81'	Stadium: Rapid-Giulești; Referee: Szabolcs Kovacs

==== Knockout stage ====
3 April 2025 Quarter-finals	CFR Cluj	1–1 (a.e.t.) (5–3 p)	Universitatea Craiova	Cluj-Napoca
20:00 EEST (UTC+03)	Kamara 60'	Report	Baiaram 50'	Stadium: Dr. Constantin Rădulescu; Referee: Marcel Bîrsan
	Penalties
	Emërllahu (penalty scored); Tachtsidis (penalty scored); Korenica (penalty scored); Păun (penalty scored); Munteanu (penalty scored)		(penalty scored) Mekvabishvili; (penalty scored) Lukić; (penalty missed) Căpățînă; (penalty scored) Baiaram

24 April 2024 Semi-finals	CFR Cluj	4–1	Farul Constanța	Cluj-Napoca
20:30 EEST (UTC+03)	Graovac 1'; Abeid 42'; Munteanu 45'; Emërllahu 50'	Report	Alibec 35'	Stadium: Dr. Constantin Rădulescu; Referee: Radu Petrescu

14 May 2025 Final	CFR Cluj	3–2	Hermannstadt	Arad
20:30 EEST	Kamara 15'; Munteanu 22'; Nkololo 48'	Report	Căpușă 37'; Buș 74'	Stadium: Francisc von Neuman; Referee: Andrei Chivulete

== Group stage ==
=== Group A ===
Pos	Team	Pld	W	D	L	GF	GA	GD	Pts	Qualification	CFR	RAP	BOT	AFU	CEA	ARG
1	CFR Cluj	3	2	1	0	6	3	+3	7	Advance to knockout phase	—	—	—	—	2–1	—
2	Rapid București	3	2	0	1	5	2	+3	6	Advance to knockout phase	0–2	—	—	—	—	—
3	Botoșani	3	2	0	1	4	2	+2	6		—	0–2	—	—	—	—
4	Afumați	3	1	1	1	2	3	−1	4		—	0–3	—	—	0–0	2–0
5	Ceahlăul Piatra Neamț	3	0	1	2	1	3	−2	1		1–2	—	0–1	—	—	—
6	Argeș Pitești	3	0	1	2	2	7	−5	1		2–2	—	0–3	—	—	—

Source: FRF
Legend: Blue = home team win; Yellow = draw; Red = away team win.

29 October 2024	Argeș	2-2	CFR Cluj	Mioveni
21:00 EET	Borța 7'; Patrick Dulcea (yellow card) 69'; Morar 77' (pen.) (yellow card) 90+2'; Guilherme Garutti (yellow card) 90+3'	Report	Mogoș 32'; Abeid 44'	Stadium: Orășenesc Stadium; Referee: (Romania) George Cătălin Roman

=== UEFA Conference League ===
==== Second qualifying round ====
The draw was held on 19 June 2024.

25 July 2024 First leg	CFR Cluj (Romania)	0–0	(Belarus) Neman Grodno	Cluj-Napoca
20:30 UTC+3		Report		Stadium: Dr. Constantin Rădulescu Stadium; Referee: Miloš Gigovic (Bosnia and Herzegovina)

1 August 2024 Second leg	Neman Grodno (Belarus)	0–5 (0–5 agg.)	(Romania) CFR Cluj	Győr, Hungary
20:00 UTC+2			Muhar 17'; Bîrligea 39', 57'; Korenica 59'; N'Kololo 90+3'	Stadium: Ménfői úti Stadion
Note: Due to a penalty from UEFA resulting from Belarus's involvement in the Russian invasion of Ukraine, Belarusian clubs plays their home matches on neutral grounds until further notice.

==== Third qualifying round ====
8 August 2024 First leg	Maccabi Petah Tikva (Israel)	0–1	(Romania) CFR Cluj	Sofia, Bulgaria
21:00 UTC+3			Muhar 8'	Stadium: Stadion Georgi Asparuhov; Attendance: 147; Referee: Patrik Kolarić (Croatia)

15 August 2024 Second leg	CFR Cluj (Romania)	1–0 (2–0 agg.)	(Israel) Maccabi Petah Tikva	Cluj-Napoca
20:00 UTC+3	Krešić 50'			Stadium: Dr. Constantin Rădulescu Stadium; Attendance: 5,490; Referee: Tamás Bognár (Hungary)

==== Play-off round ====
22 August 2024 First leg	CFR Cluj (Romania)	1–0	(Cyprus) Pafos	Cluj-Napoca
20:30 EEST	Korenica 16'; Deac (red card) 40'; Boben (yellow card) 45+1'; Tachtsidis (yellow card) 58'; Bîrligea (yellow card) 58'; Popa (yellow card) 90+3'; Camora (yellow card) 90+5'	Report	Pêpê Rodrigues (yellow card) 34'; Jairo (yellow card) 88'; David Goldar (yellow card) 90+1'; Luckassen (yellow card) 90+2'	Stadium: Dr. Constantin Rădulescu Stadium; Attendance: 5,826; Referee: (Serbia) Novak Simović

29 August 2024 Second leg	Pafos (Cyprus)	3–0 (3–1 agg.)	(Romania) CFR Cluj	Limassol
20:00 EEST	Jajá 28'; David Goldar 31' (yellow card) 60'; Tanković 49' (pen.); Bruno Felipe (yellow card) 69'; Dragomir (yellow card) 74'	Report	Popa (yellow card) 35'; Tachtsidis (yellow card) 67'; Kamara (yellow card) 83'	Stadium: Alphamega Stadium; Attendance: 4,336; Referee: (England) Craig Pawson
