= 2025 Cupa României final =

- Event: 2024–25 Cupa României
CFR Cluj	FC Hermannstadt
3	2
- Date: 14 May 2025
- Venue: Francisc von Neuman, Arad
- Referee: Andrei Chivulete

The 2025 Cupa României final was the final match of the 2024–25 Cupa României and the 87th final of the Cupa României, Romania's premier football cup competition. It was played on 14 May 2025 between CFR Cluj and FC Hermannstadt at the Stadionul Francisc von Neuman in Arad.

CFR Cluj won the match 3–2 to secure their fifth Cupa României title.

== Match ==
14 May 2025
20:30 EEST (UTC+03)

CFR Cluj	3–2	FC Hermannstadt
Mohammed Kamara 15'; Louis Munteanu 23'; Béni Nkololo 48'		Tiberiu Căpușă 37'; Sergiu Buș 74'

Stadionul Francisc von Neuman, Arad
Referee: Andrei Florin Chivulete

CFR Cluj	Hermannstadt

GK	89	(Romania) Otto Hindrich	(yellow card) 86'
DF	4	(Brazil) Léo Bolgado
DF	45	(Romania) Camora (c)	(substituted off) 82'
DF	6	(The Gambia) Sheriff Sinyan
MF	18	(Kosovo) Lindon Emërllahu	(yellow card) 90+6'
MF	5	(Bosnia and Herzegovina) Daniel Graovac	(yellow card) 87'
MF	88	(Croatia) Damjan Đoković	(red card) 90+7'
MF	17	(Kosovo) Meriton Korenica	(yellow card) 59'	(substituted off) 82'
FW	7	(Liberia) Mohammed Kamara	(yellow card) 90+2'	15'	(substituted off) 90+13'
FW	9	(Romania) Louis Munteanu	23'	(substituted off) 90+9'
FW	96	(France) Béni Nkololo	(yellow card) 82'	48'	(substituted off) 82'
Substitutes:
DF	3	(Mauritania) Aly Abeid		(substituted on) 90+13'
MF	10	(Romania) Ciprian Deac
MF	82	(Romania) Alin Fică		(substituted on) 82'
DF	27	(Romania) Matei Ilie		(substituted on) 90+9'
MF	11	(Romania) Adrian Păun
GK	21	(Romania) Mihai Popa
FW	93	(Moldova) Virgiliu Postolachi		(substituted on) 82'
DF	13	(Portugal) Simão Rocha		(substituted on) 82'
MF	97	(Romania) Andres Sfait
Manager:
(Romania) Dan Petrescu

GK	25	(Romania) Cătălin Căbuz
DF	96	(Romania) Silviu Balaure		(substituted off) 70'
MF	29	(Romania) Ciprian Biceanu
DF	66	(Romania) Tiberiu Căpușă	37'
FW	9	(Romania) Aurelian Chițu
DF	15	(Portugal) Tiago Gonçalves
MF	24	(Bulgaria) Angel Ivanov
MF	8	(Italy) Alessandro Murgia
DF	2	(Luxembourg) Vahid Selimović
FW	7	(Romania) Ianis Stoica		(substituted off) 82'
DF	4	(Romania) Ionuț Stoica (c)
Substitutes:
FW	30	(Ghana) Nana Antwi		(substituted on) 82'
DF	5	(Romania) Florin Bejan
FW	11	(Romania) Sergiu Buș	74'	(substituted off) 82'
DF	27	(Romania) Valerică Găman
MF	17	(Romania) Dragoș Iancu		(substituted on) 70'
DF	6	(The Gambia) Kalifa Kujabi		(substituted on) 82'
GK	31	(Romania) Vlad Muțiu
MF	10	(Romania) Cristian Neguț		(substituted on) 70'
FW	45	(Romania) Robert Popescu		(substituted on) 82'
Manager:
(Romania) Marius Măldărășanu
