= Peter Michael (footballer) =

Nigerian footballer (born 1998)

Personal information
- Full name: Peter Godly Michael
- Date of birth: 10 May 1998 (age 28)
- Place of birth: Calabar, Nigeria
- Height: 1.89 m (6 ft 2 in)
- Position: Forward

Team information
- Current team: Hapoel Ra'anana
- Number: 9

Youth career
- –2017: Crown FC

Senior career*
| Years | Team | Apps | (Gls) |
| 2017–2018 | Rivers United | | |
| 2018–2020 | Vålerenga | 13 | (3) |
| 2019 | → Skeid (loan) | 7 | (1) |
| 2020 | → Øygarden (loan) | 16 | (6) |
| 2020–2022 | Sogndal | 28 | (7) |
| 2022 | Grorud | 10 | (6) |
| 2023 | VPS | 28 | (17) |
| 2024–2025 | CFR Cluj | 31 | (3) |
| 2025 | → Ironi Tiberias (loan) | 10 | (1) |
| 2025–2026 | Ironi Tiberias | 27 | (3) |
| 2026– | Hapoel Ra'anana | 0 | (0) |

International career
- Nigeria U17
- Nigeria U20
- * Club domestic league appearances and goals as of 24 June 2026

Peter Godly Michael (born 10 May 1998) is a Nigerian professional footballer who plays as a forward for Liga Leumit club Hapoel Ra'anana.

== Club career ==
=== Norway ===
In February 2018, Michael signed a four-year contract with Eliteserien side Vålerenga.

=== VPS ===
On 29 March 2023, Michael joined VPS in Finland for an undisclosed fee. During the season, Michael scored only one goal in the first half of the season. Since July, he scored 16 goals in the seasons's second half.

Michael was named the Veikkausliiga Player of the Month four times in a row in July, August, September and October 2023. On 14 September 2023, VPS exercised their option to keep Michael in Vaasa until the end of 2024.

On 18 October 2023, Michael was named the Veikkausliiga Player of the Season, per voting by the fans. On 1 December 2023, Michael was awarded the Veikkausliiga Player of the Year trophy, and he was also named The Best Forward of the Season.

=== CFR Cluj ===
On 19 January 2024, Michael signed with Romanian club CFR Cluj for an undisclosed fee, rumoured to be worth around €500,000. Ten days later, he scored on his Liga I debut by coming on as a substitute, in a 4–1 win over Voluntari.

== Career statistics ==
As of 10 May 2025

Appearances and goals by club, season and competition
| Club | Season | League | | | Cup (Note: Includes Norwegian Cup, Suomen Cup and Cupa României) | | Continental | | Total | |
| Club | Season | Division | Apps | Goals | Apps | Goals | Apps | Goals | Apps | Goals |
|---|---|---|---|---|---|---|---|---|---|---|
| Vålerenga | 2018 | Eliteserien | 13 | 3 | 2 | 1 | — | | 15 | 4 |
| Vålerenga 2 | 2018 | 2. divisjon | 7 | 2 | — | | — | | 7 | 2 |
| Skeid (loan) | 2019 | 1. divisjon | 7 | 1 | 0 | 0 | — | | 7 | 1 |
| Øygarden (loan) | 2020 | 1. divisjon | 16 | 6 | 0 | 0 | — | | 16 | 6 |
| Sogndal | 2020 | 1. divisjon | 11 | 3 | 0 | 0 | — | | 11 | 3 |
| Sogndal | 2021 | 1. divisjon | 5 | 2 | 0 | 0 | — | | 5 | 2 |
| Sogndal | 2022 | 1. divisjon | 12 | 2 | 2 | 0 | — | | 14 | 2 |
| Sogndal | Total | | 28 | 7 | 2 | 0 | — | | 30 | 7 |
| Sogndal 2 | 2021 | 3. divisjon | 5 | 0 | — | | — | | 5 | 0 |
| Sogndal 2 | 2022 | 4. divisjon | 6 | 7 | — | | — | | 6 | 7 |
| Sogndal 2 | Total | | 11 | 7 | 0 | 0 | — | | 11 | 7 |
| Grorud | 2022 | 1. divisjon | 10 | 6 | 0 | 0 | — | | 10 | 6 |
| VPS | 2023 | Veikkausliiga | 28 | 17 | 4 | 2 | — | | 32 | 19 |
| CFR Cluj | 2023–24 | Liga I | 18 | 1 | 1 | 0 | — | | 19 | 1 |
| CFR Cluj | 2024–25 | Liga I | 13 | 2 | 3 | 0 | 4 (Note: Appearances in UEFA Conference League) | 0 | 20 | 2 |
| CFR Cluj | Total | | 31 | 3 | 4 | 0 | 4 | 0 | 39 | 3 |
| Ironi Tiberias | 2024–25 | Israeli Premier League | 27 | 3 | — | | — | | 27 | 3 |
| Hapoel Ra'anana | 2025–26 | Liga Leumit | 0 | 0 | — | | — | | 0 | 0 |
| Career total | | | 177 | 55 | 12 | 3 | 4 | 0 | 194 | 58 |

== Honours ==
CFR Cluj

- Liga I runner-up: 2023–24
- Cupa României: 2024–25

Individual

- Veikkausliiga Player of the Year: 2023
- Veikkausliiga Forward of the Year: 2023
- Veikkausliiga Team of the Year: 2023
- Veikkausliiga Player of the Month: July 2023, August 2023, September 2023, October 2023
