= Matija Boben =

Slovenian footballer

Personal information
- Date of birth: 26 February 1994 (age 32)
- Place of birth: Ljubljana, Slovenia
- Height: 1.91 m (6 ft 3 in)
- Position: Centre back

Team information
- Current team: Mura (on loan from Celje)
- Number: 42

Youth career
- 2000–2008: Kočevje
- 2008–2013: Interblock

Senior career*
Years	Team	Apps	(Gls)
2013	Triglav Kranj	4	(0)
2014–2015	Ivančna Gorica	23	(0)
2015	→ Bolton Wanderers (loan)	0	(0)
2015–2017	Gorica	34	(1)
2017–2019	Rostov	7	(0)
2019	→ Livorno (loan)	9	(0)
2019–2021	Livorno	30	(1)
2020–2021	→ Ternana (loan)	29	(2)
2021–2023	Ternana	25	(0)
2022–2023	→ Pescara (loan)	24	(0)
2023–2025	CFR Cluj	25	(1)
2025	→ Politehnica Iași (loan)	6	(0)
2025–	Celje	5	(0)
2026–	→ Mura (loan)	3	(0)

International career^{‡}
2009–2010	Slovenia U16	3	(0)
2010	Slovenia U17	5	(0)
2017	Slovenia B	1	(0)
2017–2018	Slovenia	2	(0)
- * Club domestic league appearances and goals as of 14 March 2026 ‡ National team caps and goals as of 2 June 2018

Matija Boben (born 26 February 1994) is a Slovenian professional footballer who plays as a centre-back for Slovenian PrvaLiga club Mura on loan from Celje.

== Club career ==
He made his professional debut in the Slovenian PrvaLiga in the 2013–14 season for NK Triglav Kranj.

On 4 July 2017, he signed a three-year contract with a one-year-extension option with the Russian Premier League club FC Rostov.

On 28 January 2019, he joined Italian club Livorno on loan until the end of the 2018–19 season. On 28 June 2019, Rostov and Livorno agreed on a permanent transfer.

On 5 October 2020, he went to Ternana on loan.

On 8 July 2021, he moved to Ternana on a permanent basis and signed a three-year contract. On 3 August 2022, Boben was loaned to Pescara.

== International career ==
Boben made his debut for Slovenia in a January 2017 friendly match against Finland and his second international was a June 2018 friendly against Montenegro.

== Career statistics ==
=== Club ===
As of match played 1 June 2025

Appearances and goals by club, season and competition
Club	Season	League			National cup (Note: Includes Slovak Cup, Russian Cup, Coppa Italia, Coppa Italia Serie C, Cupa României)		Other		Total	
Club	Season	Division	Apps	Goals	Apps	Goals	Apps	Goals	Apps	Goals
Triglav Kranj	2013–14	Slovenian PrvaLiga	4	0	1	0	—		5	0
Ivančna Gorica	2013–14	3. SNL	9	0	—		—		9	0
Ivančna Gorica	2014–15	3. SNL	14	0	0	0	—		14	0
Ivančna Gorica	Total		23	0	0	0	—		23	0
Gorica	2015–16	Slovenian PrvaLiga	9	0	0	0	—		9	0
Gorica	2016–17	Slovenian PrvaLiga	25	1	3	0	1 (Note: Appearance in UEFA Europa League)	0	29	1
Gorica	2017–18	Slovenian PrvaLiga	—		—		1	0	1	0
Gorica	Total		34	1	3	0	2	0	39	1
Rostov	2017–18	Russian Premier League	7	0	1	0	—		8	0
Rostov	2018–19	Russian Premier League	0	0	1	0	—		1	0
Rostov	Total		7	0	2	0	—		9	0
Livorno (loan)	2018–19	Serie B	9	0	0	0	—		9	0
Livorno	2019–20	Serie B	30	1	1	0	—		31	1
Livorno	2020–21	Serie C	0	0	1	0	—		1	0
Livorno	Total		39	1	2	0	—		41	1
Ternana (loan)	2020–21	Serie C	29	2	1	0	2 (Note: Appearances in Supercoppa di Serie C)	0	32	2
Ternana	2021–22	Serie B	25	0	3	0	—		28	0
Ternana	Total		54	2	4	0	2	0	60	2
Pescara (loan)	2022–23	Serie C	24	0	1	0	4 (Note: Appearances in Serie C promotion play-offs)	0	29	0
CFR Cluj	2023–24	Liga I	20	1	1	0	0	0	21	1
CFR Cluj	2024–25	Liga I	5	0	1	0	6 (Note: Appearances in UEFA Conference League)	0	12	0
CFR Cluj	Total		25	1	2	0	6	0	33	1
Politehnica Iași (loan)	2024–25	Liga I	6	0	0	0	2 (Note: Appearance in Liga I promotion/relegation play-offs)	0	8	0
Career total			216	5	15	0	16	0	247	5

=== International ===
As of match played 2 June 2018

Appearances and goals by national team and year
National team	Year	Apps	Goals
Slovenia
Slovenia	2017	1	0
Slovenia	2018	1	0
Total		2	0

== Honours ==
Ternana

- Serie C: 2020–21
- Supercoppa di Serie C: 2021

CFR Cluj

- Cupa României: 2024–25
