= Robert Filip =

Romanian professional footballer

Personal information
- Full name: Robert Constantin Filip
- Date of birth: 2 March 2002 (age 24)
- Place of birth: Piatra Neamț, Romania
- Height: 1.80 m (5 ft 11 in)
- Position: Midfielder

Team information
- Current team: Minaur Baia Mare
- Number: 47

Youth career
- –2020: Alessandria

Senior career*
Years	Team	Apps	(Gls)
2020–2023	Alessandria	14	(1)
2020–2021	→ PDHA (loan)	36	(5)
2021–2022	→ Derthona (loan)	35	(5)
2023–2025	CFR Cluj	19	(1)
2025	→ Botoșani (loan)	14	(1)
2025–2026	Ceahlăul Piatra Neamț	17	(0)
2026	ASA Târgu Mureș	5	(0)
2026	Hermannstadt	0	(0)
2026–	Minaur Baia Mare	0	(0)

International career^{‡}
2022–2024	Romania U20	4	(0)
2023–2024	Romania U21	1	(0)
- * Club domestic league appearances and goals as of 10 April 2026 ‡ National team caps and goals as of 26 March 2024

Robert Constantin Filip (born 2 March 2002) is a Romanian professional footballer who plays as a midfielder for Liga III club Minaur Baia Mare.

== Career ==
Filip made his senior debut for Alessandria on 4 September 2022, in a 1–0 Serie C loss over Imolese.

== Honours ==
CFR Cluj

- Supercupa României runner-up: 2025
