= Louis Munteanu =

Romanian footballer (born 2002)

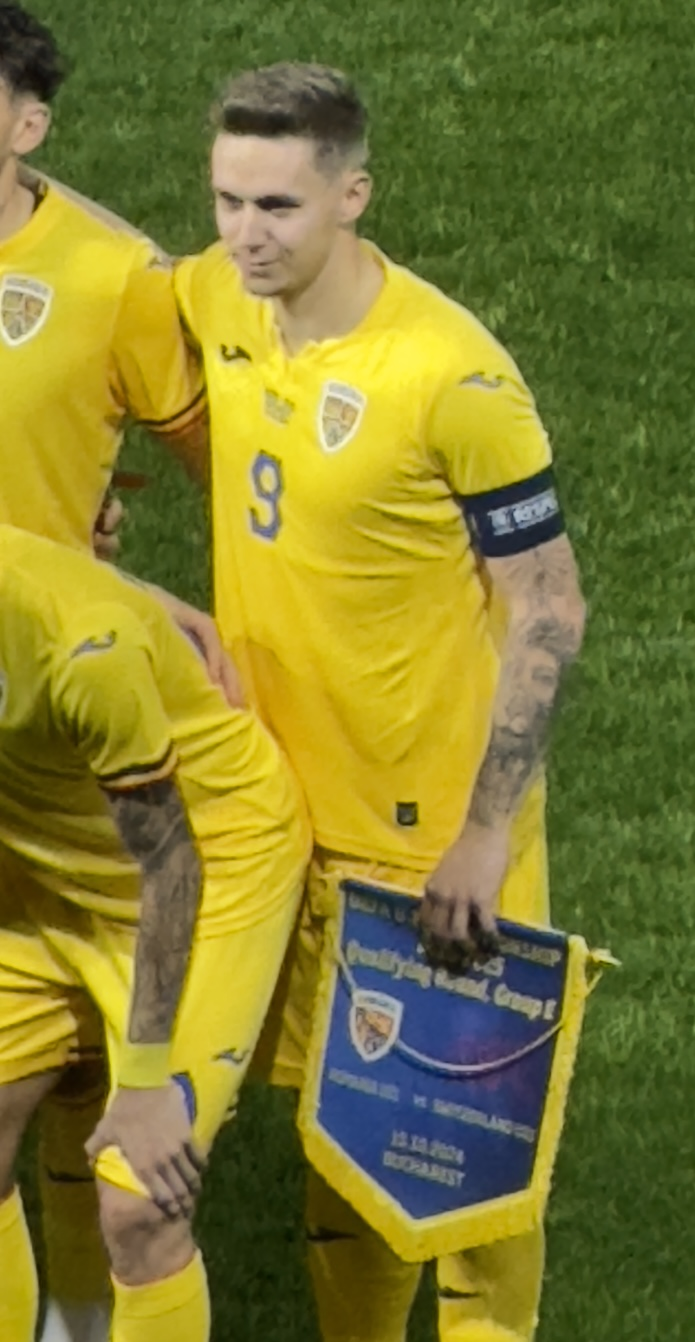
- Munteanu with Romania U21 in 2024

Personal information
- Date of birth: 16 June 2002 (age 24)
- Place of birth: Vaslui, Romania
- Height: 1.85 m (6 ft 1 in)
- Position: Forward

Team information
- Current team: D.C. United
- Number: 11

Youth career
- 2007–2015: LPS Vaslui
- 2015–2019: Gheorghe Hagi Academy
- 2020–2022: Fiorentina

Senior career*
Years	Team	Apps	(Gls)
2019–2020	Viitorul Constanța	21	(3)
2020–2024	Fiorentina	0	(0)
2022–2023	→ Farul Constanța (loan)	29	(10)
2023–2024	→ Farul Constanța (loan)	34	(12)
2024–2026	CFR Cluj	49	(25)
2026–	D.C. United	22	(6)

International career^{‡}
2018	Romania U16	4	(1)
2017–2019	Romania U17	14	(4)
2019–2020	Romania U18	4	(3)
2019–2021	Romania U19	3	(0)
2022	Romania U20	2	(0)
2021–2025	Romania U21	20	(6)
2023–	Romania	8	(3)
- * Club domestic league appearances and goals as of 20 September 2026 ‡ National team caps and goals as of 28 September 2026

Louis Munteanu (Romanian pronunciation: [ˈluis munˈte̯anu]; born 16 June 2002) is a Romanian professional footballer who plays as a forward for Major League Soccer club D.C. United and the Romania national team.

Munteanu made his senior debut for Viitorul Constanța in 2019, aged 17, before moving to Italian side Fiorentina the following year. He returned to his boyhood club—which merged with Farul Constanța—in 2022, and played a key role in securing the national title during his first loan spell back. In 2024, Munteanu signed for CFR Cluj, where he helped to a Cupa României and finished as Liga I top scorer in his first season at the team. He transferred abroad again to American side D.C. United in 2026, joining them as a Designated Player for an initial €6 million (US$7 million), which represented a club-record fee.

Internationally, Munteanu represented Romania under-21 in the 2023 and 2025 UEFA European Championships. In October 2023, he registered his full debut in a goalless draw with Belarus in the Euro 2024 qualifiers.

== Club career ==
=== Viitorul Constanța ===
Munteanu was born in Vaslui, Romania. He moved to the Gheorghe Hagi Academy in Constanța at age nine, finding the transition difficult and later recalling that he "cried every night" during his first year away from home. His mother eventually relocated to Constanța to support him, helping him adjust and continue his development.

Munteanu made his professional debut for Viitorul Constanța on 27 October 2019, in a 3–2 away Liga I loss to Dinamo București. Five days later, he scored his first goal in a 3–0 home success over Chindia Târgoviște. He amassed three goals from 19 appearances during his first season as a senior, all in the league championship.

=== Fiorentina ===
On 26 September 2020, Munteanu was transferred to Italian club Fiorentina for a rumoured fee of €2 million. During his initial two years with the Primavera side, he appeared in 40 matches and scored 13 goals.

==== First loan to Farul Constanța ====
On 15 August 2022, Munteanu rejoined the Romanian league by signing for Farul Constanța on loan until the end of the season. Before moving to Farul, he was close to being loaned to Rapid București, but the deal fell through because Fiorentina declined to include a permanent transfer clause. On the 28th that month, he scored his first two goals in a 3–1 away victory over defending champions CFR Cluj.

On 6 May 2023, Munteanu netted his second double of the campaign in a 7–2 home thrashing of Rapid București. Fifteen days later, he scored the winner in a 3–2 home success over league contenders FCSB, securing the national title for Farul with one match remaining. On 28 May, Munteanu ended his spell with ten goals in 29 matches by scoring twice in a 2–1 away victory at CFR Cluj, also missing a penalty.

==== Second loan to Farul Constanța ====
On 18 August 2023, Munteanu was sent on another year-long loan to Farul. He made his debut in European competitions six days later, coming on for Adrian Mazilu in a 2–1 home win over HJK in the UEFA Europa Conference League play-off round. On 27 August, he scored both goals in a 2–0 home win against Universitatea Craiova.

Munteanu surpassed his previous season's statistics by netting 12 goals in 34 Liga I appearances, and was voted Farul Player of the Year by the fans.

=== CFR Cluj ===
On 31 July 2024, amid interest from fellow league clubs FCSB and Rapid București, CFR Cluj officially announced the transfer of Munteanu on a four-year contract. CFR Cluj owner Neluțu Varga admitted that the transfer fee was "around" €2 million, contrasting some reports that indicated it might be as high as €2.8 million, and also stated that Fiorentina retained 50% participation rights in a co-ownership deal.

Munteanu registered his debut on 4 August 2024, starting in a 3–2 home Liga I loss to rivals Universitatea Cluj. One week later, he scored his first two goals in a 3–0 win over newly-promoted Unirea Slobozia. On 15 September, Munteanu netted another double in a 2–2 home derby draw with FCSB.

On 27 January 2025, Louis Munteanu netted his first professional hat-trick in a 3–1 home victory over his former club Farul Constanța. His consistent goalscoring form continued on 9 March, when he recorded another hat-trick in a 6–0 thrashing of Gloria Buzău in the final round of the regular season. On 20 April 2025, he scored a brace against FCSB in a 3–2 away defeat in the championship play-offs.

On 14 May 2025, Munteanu scored in the Cupa României final, helping his team secure a 3–2 victory over Hermannstadt at the Francisc von Neuman Stadium in Arad. His final goal of the season, netted in a 1–1 draw with FCSB on 23 May, made him the Liga I top scorer with 23 goals and equalled Mihai Adam's long-standing club record from the 1973–74 season. CFR Cluj concluded the campaign as runners-up, and Munteanu was named the Under-21 Player of the Season by LPF.

Munteanu scored his first European goal on 17 July 2025, ten minutes after coming on in a 3–0 home victory over Paks in the Europa League first qualifying round. In late August, after returning to Romania following a harsh 2–7 defeat to BK Häcken in the Conference League play-off round, he refused to train amid rumours of a transfer abroad and subsequently missed a Liga I match against Oțelul Galați, which CFR Cluj lost 1–4. By the turn of the year, Munteanu's form declined, as he only managed to score two goals from 14 league matches.

=== D.C. United ===
On 5 January 2026, Munteanu joined Major League Soccer team D.C. United as a Designated Player, signing a three-and-a-half-year contract with an option for a further year. D.C. United officially announced that it paid a club-record transfer fee of US$7 million (€6 million), with reports also mentioning potential add-ons of up to US$3 million (€2.6 million) and a 35% sell-on clause.

Munteanu made his club debut on 1 March 2026, entering as a substitute and playing 14 minutes in a 1–1 away league draw at Austin FC. He scored his first goal on 25 April, in a 3–2 home victory over Orlando City SC. Eight days later, he netted a brace in a 2–0 away victory against New York City FC.

== International career ==
On 15 June 2023, Munteanu was selected in the Romania national under-21 team squad for the 2023 UEFA European Championship. He started in all three group games, as his side failed to score any goals and finished in last place. On 12 October that year, Munteanu made his full debut for Romania by coming on as a 77th-minute substitute for Denis Drăguș in a goalless draw with Belarus in the Euro 2024 qualifiers.

On 11 October 2024, Munteanu scored a hat-trick in a 6–2 away thrashing of Montenegro counting for the 2025 European Under-21 Championship qualifiers. Four days later, he provided two assists as Romania defeated Switzerland 3–1 at home and qualified for its fourth consecutive European Under-21 Championship. On 14 June 2025, he scored a long-range goal in a 1–2 loss to Spain at the final tournament, with Romania finishing last in its group.

On 9 October 2025, on his second appearance for the senior national team, Munteanu opened the scoring in a 2–1 friendly win over Moldova.

== Style of play ==
Munteanu is primarily deployed as a centre-forward, but can also play as a winger due to his refined technical ability and link-up play. He maintains precision and executes moves even at high speed, making him versatile across attacking positions.

== Career statistics ==
=== Club ===
As of match played 20 September 2026

Appearances and goals by club, season and competition
Club	Season	League			National cup (Note: Includes Cupa României, U.S. Open Cup)		Continental		Other		Total	
Club	Season	Division	Apps	Goals	Apps	Goals	Apps	Goals	Apps	Goals	Apps	Goals
Viitorul Constanța	2019–20	Liga I	19	3	0	0	0	0	0	0	19	3
Viitorul Constanța	2020–21	Liga I	2	0	0	0	—		—		2	0
Viitorul Constanța	Total		21	3	0	0	0	0	0	0	21	3
Fiorentina	2020–21	Serie A	0	0	0	0	—		—		0	0
Fiorentina	2021–22	Serie A	0	0	0	0	—		—		0	0
Fiorentina	Total		0	0	0	0	—		—		0	0
Farul Constanța (loan)	2022–23	Liga I	29	10	0	0	—		—		29	10
Farul Constanța (loan)	2023–24	Liga I	34	12	0	0	2 (Note: Appearances in UEFA Conference League)	0	—		36	12
Farul Constanța (loan)	Total		63	22	0	0	2	0	—		65	22
CFR Cluj	2024–25	Liga I	35	23	5	2	2	0	—		42	25
CFR Cluj	2025–26	Liga I	14	2	1	0	6 (Note: Four appearances and one goal in UEFA Europa League, two appearances in UEFA Conference League)	1	0	0	21	3
CFR Cluj	Total		49	25	6	2	8	1	0	0	63	28
D.C. United	2026	Major League Soccer	22	6	1	0	—		—		23	6
Career total			155	56	7	2	10	1	0	0	172	59

=== International ===
As of match played 28 September 2026

Appearances and goals by national team and year
National team	Year	Apps	Goals
Romania
Romania	2023	1	0
Romania	2024	0	0
Romania	2025	3	2
Romania	2026	4	1
Total		8	3

Scores and results list Romania's goal tally first, score column indicates score after each Munteanu goal

List of international goals scored by Louis Munteanu
No.	Date	Venue	Cap	Opponent	Score	Result	Competition
1	9 October 2025	Arena Națională, Bucharest, Romania	2	Moldova	1–0	2–1	Friendly
2	18 November 2025	Ilie Oană Stadium, Ploiești, Romania	4	San Marino	7–1	7–1	2026 FIFA World Cup qualification
3	2 June 2026	Mikheil Meskhi Stadium, Tbilisi, Georgia	5	Georgia	1–1	1–1	Friendly

== Honours ==
Farul Constanța

- Liga I: 2022–23

CFR Cluj

- Cupa României: 2024–25
- Supercupa României runner-up: 2025

Individual

- Liga I top scorer: 2024–25
- Liga I Under-21 Player of the Season: 2024–25
- Liga I Team of the Season: 2024–25
