= Matei Ilie =

Romanian footballer

Personal information
- Full name: Matei Cristian Ilie
- Date of birth: 11 December 2002 (age 23)
- Place of birth: Piatra Neamț, Romania
- Height: 1.85 m (6 ft 1 in)
- Position: Centre-back

Team information
- Current team: Kasımpaşa
- Number: 27

Youth career
- –2017: Ceahlăul Piatra Neamț
- 2017–2018: Pro Sesto
- 2018–2021: Padova
- 2020–2021: → Hellas Verona (loan)

Senior career*
Years	Team	Apps	(Gls)
2021–2023	Padova	16	(0)
2023–2026	CFR Cluj	81	(4)
2026–	Kasımpaşa	11	(0)

International career^{‡}
2018	Romania U17	1	(0)
2021–2023	Romania U20	7	(0)
2023–2025	Romania U21	12	(2)
2026–	Romania	5	(0)
- * Club domestic league appearances and goals as of 8 November 2026 ‡ National team caps and goals as of 14 November 2026

Matei Cristian Ilie (born 11 December 2002) is a Romanian professional footballer who plays as a centre-back for Süper Lig club Kasımpaşa and the Romania national team.

== Club career ==
=== Padova ===
Ilie made his Serie C debut on 10 September 2022 in a game against Vicenza. On 1 September 2023, Ilie's contract with Padova was terminated by mutual consent.

=== CFR Cluj ===
On 5 September 2023, Ilie signed with CFR Cluj.

== Personal life ==
His father, Constantin, was also a professional footballer.

== Career statistics ==
As of match played 8 November 2026

Appearances and goals by club, season and competition
Club	Season	League			National cup (Note: Includes Coppa Italia, Cupa României)		Europe		Other		Total	
Club	Season	Division	Apps	Goals	Apps	Goals	Apps	Goals	Apps	Goals	Apps	Goals
Padova	2021–22	Serie C	0	0	1	0	—		0	0	1	0
Padova	2022–23	Serie C	16	0	1	0	—		—		17	0
Padova	Total		16	0	2	0	—		0	0	18	0
CFR Cluj	2023–24	Liga I	18	1	2	0	—		—		20	1
CFR Cluj	2024–25	Liga I	32	1	2	0	2 (Note: Appearances in UEFA Conference League)	0	—		36	1
CFR Cluj	2025–26	Liga I	31	2	3	0	7 (Note: Six appearances in UEFA Europa League, one appearance in UEFA Conference League)	0	0	0	41	2
CFR Cluj	Total		81	4	7	0	9	0	0	0	97	4
Kasımpaşa	2026–27	Süper Lig	11	0	0	0	—		—		11	0
Career total			108	4	9	0	9	0	0	0	126	4

=== International ===
As of match played 14 November 2026

Appearances and goals by national team and year
National team	Year	Apps	Goals
Romania	2026	5	0
Total		5	0

== Honours ==
Padova

- Coppa Italia Serie C: 2021–22

CFR Cluj

- Cupa României: 2024–25
- Supercupa României runner-up: 2025
