= Léo Bolgado =

Brazilian footballer

Personal information
- Full name: Leonardo da Costa Bolgado
- Date of birth: 20 August 1998 (age 28)
- Place of birth: Cuiabá, Brazil
- Height: 1.90 m (6 ft 3 in)
- Position: Centre-back

Team information
- Current team: Petro Atlético

Youth career
- 2015–2018: Cruzeiro
- 2018–2020: Coimbra

Senior career*
Years	Team	Apps	(Gls)
2019–2023	Coimbra	0	(0)
2019–2020	→ Académica U23 (loan)	28	(3)
2020–2021	→ Alverca (loan)	21	(2)
2021–2022	→ Leixões (loan)	32	(4)
2022–2023	→ Casa Pia (loan)	11	(1)
2023–2024	Leixões	32	(2)
2024–2026	CFR Cluj	40	(3)
2025–2026	→ Rapid București (loan)	13	(1)
2026–	Petro Atlético	0	(0)
- * Club domestic league appearances and goals as of 25 May 2026

Leonardo da Costa Bolgado (born 20 August 1998), known as Léo Bolgado, is a Brazilian professional footballer who plays as a centre-back for Girabola club Petro Atlético.

== Club career ==
Bolgado is a youth product of the Brazilian clubs Cruzeiro and Coimbra, and had a stint on loan with the Académica U23s in Portugal in the 2019-20 season.

He began his senior career with Alverca on loan from Coimbra for the 2020-21 season in the Portuguese third division.

The following season he was loaned to Leixões in the Liga Portugal 2 in the 2021-22 season, where he was named to that divion's Team of the Season making 32 appearances.

On 7 July 2022, he was sent on loan to Casa Pia, who had been recently promoted to the Portuguese Primeira Liga.

On 4 July 2023, Bolgado returned to Leixões on a permanent deal, signing a three-year contract.

== Career statistics ==
=== Club ===
As of match played 25 May 2026

Appearances and goals by club, season and competition
Club	Season	League			National cup (Note: Includes Taça de Portugal, Cupa României)		Europe		Other		Total	
Club	Season	Division	Apps	Goals	Apps	Goals	Apps	Goals	Apps	Goals	Apps	Goals
Académica U23 (loan)	2019–20	Liga Revelação	28	3	—		—		—		28	3
Alverca (loan)	2020–21	Campeonato de Portugal	21	2	2	0	—		—		23	2
Leixões (loan)	2021–22	Liga Portugal 2	32	4	3	1	—		—		35	5
Casa Pia (loan)	2022–23	Primeira Liga	11	1	3	0	—		2 (Note: Appearances in Taça da Liga)	0	16	1
Leixões	2023–24	Liga Portugal 2	32	2	2	0	—		3	1	37	3
CFR Cluj	2024–25	Liga I	36	3	4	0	0	0	—		40	3
CFR Cluj	2025–26	Liga I	4	0	—		8 (Note: Six appearances in UEFA Europa League, two appearances in UEFA Conference League)	0	1 (Note: Appearance in Supercupa României)	0	13	0
CFR Cluj	Total		40	3	4	0	8	0	1	0	53	3
Rapid București (loan)	2025–26	Liga I	13	1	2	0	—		—		15	1
Petro Atlético	2026–27	Girabola	0	0	0	0	0	0	0	0	0	0
Career total			134	16	16	1	8	0	6	1	164	18

== Honours ==
CFR Cluj

- Cupa României: 2024–25
- Supercupa României runner-up: 2025
