= Alin Fică =

Romanian footballer

Personal information
- Full name: Alin Răzvan Fică
- Date of birth: 14 June 2001 (age 25)
- Place of birth: Caracal, Romania
- Height: 1.81 m (5 ft 11 in)
- Position: Midfielder

Team information
- Current team: CFR Cluj
- Number: 8

Youth career
- 2008–2013: CSȘ Caracal
- 2013–2020: CSȘ Corabia
- 2017–2019: Viitorul Cluj
- 2019–2020: CFR Cluj

Senior career*
Years	Team	Apps	(Gls)
2020–	CFR Cluj	93	(3)
2020	→ Rapid București (loan)	7	(0)
2021	→ Comuna Recea (loan)	12	(0)

International career
2019	Romania U19	2	(0)
- * Club domestic league appearances and goals as of 2 August 2026

Alin Răzvan Fică (born 14 June 2001) is a Romanian professional footballer who plays as a midfielder for Liga I club CFR Cluj.

== Career statistics ==
As of 13 August 2026

Appearances and goals by club, season and competition
Club	Season	League			Cupa României		Europe		Other		Total	
Club	Season	Division	Apps	Goals	Apps	Goals	Apps	Goals	Apps	Goals	Apps	Goals
CFR Cluj	2019–20	Liga I	2	0	—		—		—		2	0
CFR Cluj	2021–22	Liga I	1	0	0	0	0	0	0	0	1	0
CFR Cluj	2022–23	Liga I	7	0	2	0	0	0	1 (Note: Appearance in Liga I European play-offs)	0	10	0
CFR Cluj	2023–24	Liga I	17	0	4	1	0	0	—		21	1
CFR Cluj	2024–25	Liga I	35	2	4	1	3 (Note: Appearances in UEFA Conference League)	0	—		42	3
CFR Cluj	2025–26	Liga I	28	1	4	0	8 (Note: Six appearances and one goal in UEFA Europa League, two appearances in UEFA Conference League)	1	1 (Note: Appearance in Supercupa României)	1	41	3
CFR Cluj	2026–27	Liga I	3	0	0	0	4	1	—		7	1
CFR Cluj	Total		93	3	14	2	15	2	1	1	123	8
Rapid București (loan)	2020–21	Liga II	7	0	1	0	—		—		8	0
Comuna Recea (loan)	2020–21	Liga II	12	0	—		—		—		12	0
Career total			112	3	15	2	15	2	1	1	143	8

== Honours ==
CFR Cluj

- Liga I: 2019–20, 2021–22
- Cupa României: 2024–25
- Supercupa României runner-up: 2021, 2022, 2025
