= Simão Rocha =

Portuguese footballer (born 2000)

Personal information
- Full name: Simão Pedro Dias da Rocha
- Date of birth: 13 December 2000 (age 25)
- Place of birth: Paços de Ferreira, Portugal
- Height: 1.86 m (6 ft 1 in)
- Position: Left-back

Team information
- Current team: CFR Cluj
- Number: 14

Youth career
- –2009: ADC Penamaior
- 2009–2016: Freamunde
- 2016–2019: Paços de Ferreira

Senior career*
Years	Team	Apps	(Gls)
2019–2024	Paços de Ferreira	23	(0)
2019–2020	→ Amarante (loan)	22	(2)
2021	→ Real (loan)	9	(2)
2021–2023	→ Torreense (loan)	51	(4)
2024–	CFR Cluj	39	(1)
- * Club domestic league appearances and goals as of 12 October 2026

Simão Pedro Dias da Rocha (born 13 December 2000) is a Portuguese professional footballer who plays as a left-back for Liga I club CFR Cluj.

== Club career ==
=== Early career ===
Rocha started his senior career at Paços de Ferreira, competing in the Liga Portugal 2. Between 2019 and 2023, he was loaned at Amarante, Real S.C. and Torreense.

=== CFR Cluj ===
On 10 June 2024, Rocha joined Romanian Liga I side CFR Cluj.

== Career statistics ==
=== Club ===
As of match played 12 October 2026

Appearances and goals by club, season and competition
Club	Season	League			National cup (Note: Includes Taça de Portugal, Cupa României)		Europe		Other		Total	
Club	Season	Division	Apps	Goals	Apps	Goals	Apps	Goals	Apps	Goals	Apps	Goals
Amarante (loan)	2019–20	Campeonato de Portugal	22	2	2	0	—		—		24	2
Paços de Ferreira	2020–21	Primeira Liga	0	0	0	0	—		0	0	0	0
Paços de Ferreira	2023–24	Liga Portugal 2	23	0	0	0	—		1 (Note: Appearances in Taça da Liga)	0	24	0
Paços de Ferreira	Total		23	0	0	0	—		1	0	24	0
Real (loan)	2020–21	Campeonato de Portugal	9	2	—		—		—		9	2
Torreense (loan)	2021–22	Liga 3	23	2	2	0	—		1 (Note: Appearance in Liga 3 promotion final)	0	26	2
Torreense (loan)	2022–23	Liga Portugal 2	28	2	1	0	—		2	1	31	3
Torreense (loan)	Total		51	4	3	0	—		3	1	57	4
CFR Cluj	2024–25	Liga I	30	1	3	0	0	0	—		33	1
CFR Cluj	2025–26	Liga I	0	0	0	0	2 (Note: Appearances in UEFA Europa League)	0	0	0	2	0
CFR Cluj	2026–27	Liga I	9	0	1	0	2 (Note: Appearances in UEFA Conference League)	0	—		12	0
CFR Cluj	Total		39	1	4	0	4	0	0	0	47	1
Career total			144	9	9	0	4	0	4	1	161	10

== Honours ==
Torreense

- Liga 3: 2021–22

CFR Cluj

- Cupa României: 2024–25
- Supercupa României runner-up: 2025
