= Lindon Emërllahu =

Kosovar footballer (born 2002)

Personal information
- Date of birth: 7 December 2002 (age 23)
- Place of birth: Mushtisht, Suva Reka, Kosovo under UN administration
- Height: 1.75 m (5 ft 9 in)
- Position: Defensive midfielder

Team information
- Current team: Polissya Zhytomyr
- Number: 14

Youth career
- 2011–2021: Ballkani

Senior career*
Years	Team	Apps	(Gls)
2021–2025	Ballkani	72	(4)
2025–2026	CFR Cluj	31	(5)
2026–	Polissya Zhytomyr	22	(1)

International career^{‡}
2020	Kosovo U19	2	(0)
2023–2024	Kosovo U21	4	(2)
2022–	Kosovo	16	(2)
- * Club domestic league appearances and goals as of 6 November 2026 ‡ National team caps and goals as of 16:10, 18 November 2026 (UTC)

Lindon Emërllahu (born 7 December 2002) is a Kosovan professional footballer who plays as a defensive midfielder for Ukrainian Premier League club Polissya Zhytomyr and the Kosovo national team.

== Club career ==
=== CFR Cluj ===
On 10 February 2025, Ballkani announced the transfer of Emërllahu to Romanian Liga I club CFR Cluj. A day later, the club confirmed that Emërllahu's transfer was permanent. CFR Cluj reportedly paid a €700 thousand transfer fee. His debut with CFR Cluj came five days later against Politehnica Iași after coming on as a substitute at 76th minute in place of Damjan Đoković.

== International career ==
=== Under-19 ===
On 16 February 2020, Emërllahu was named as part of the Kosovo U19 squad for 2020 Roma Caput Mundi. His debut with Kosovo U19 came two days later in the 2020 Roma Caput Mundi match against Greece U19 after coming on as a substitute.

=== First senior call-up ===
On 16 September 2022, Emërllahu received a call-up from Kosovo for the 2022–23 UEFA Nations League matches against Northern Ireland and Cyprus. His debut with Kosovo came eleven days later in a 2022–23 UEFA Nations League match against Cyprus after coming on as a substitute at 89th minute in place of Florent Muslija.

=== Return to youth level ===
On 18 March 2023, Emërllahu received a call-up from Kosovo U21 for the friendly matches against Moldova and Turkey. His debut with Kosovo U21 came six days later in the friendly match against Moldova after being named in the starting line-up. Three days after debut, Emërllahu scored his first goals for Kosovo U21 in his second appearance for the country in a 2–4 away defeat over Turkey.

== Career statistics ==
=== International ===
As of match played 17 November 2026

Appearances and goals by national team and year
National team	Year	Apps	Goals
Kosovo
Kosovo	2022	2	0
Kosovo	2023	0	0
Kosovo	2024	4	0
Kosovo	2025	6	1
Kosovo	2026	4	1
Total		16	2

Scores and results list Kosovo's goal tally first, score column indicates score after each Emërllahu goal.

No.	Date	Venue	Opponent	Score	Result	Competition
1	6 June 2025	Fadil Vokrri Stadium, Pristina, Kosovo	Armenia	3–2	5–2	Friendly
2	31 May 2026	Stadion Letná, Prague, Czech Republic	Czech Republic	1–2	1–2	Friendly

== Honours ==
Ballkani

- Kosovo Superleague: 2021–22, 2022–23, 2023–24
- Kosovar Cup: 2023–24
- Kosovar Supercup: 2022

CFR Cluj

- Cupa României: 2024–25
- Supercupa României runner-up: 2025

Kosovo U19

- Roma Caput Mundi: 2020

Individual

- Kosovo Superleague Player of the Season: 2023–24
- Kosovo Superleague "Star of the Week" Award: 2024–25 (Round 13)
