= Mohammed Kamara =

Liberian footballer (born 1997)

Personal information
- Full name: Mohammed Kesselly Kamara
- Date of birth: 31 October 1997 (age 29)
- Place of birth: Sinkor, Liberia
- Height: 1.84 m (6 ft 0 in)
- Position: Forward

Team information
- Current team: Rapid București
- Number: 7

College career
Years	Team	Apps	(Gls)
2016–2017	TJC Apache	44	(70)
2018	UCLA Bruins	14	(5)

Senior career*
Years	Team	Apps	(Gls)
2018	Atlanta Silverbacks	14	(9)
2019	SC Paderborn	0	(0)
2019	SC Paderborn II	7	(8)
2019–2020	LA Galaxy II	9	(4)
2020–2021	Menemenspor	10	(4)
2021–2022	Hatayspor	45	(5)
2022	→ Astana (loan)	2	(0)
2022–2024	Hapoel Haifa	52	(11)
2024–2026	CFR Cluj	33	(8)
2026–	Rapid București	12	(2)

International career^{‡}
2023–	Liberia	4	(1)
- * Club domestic league appearances and goals as of 7 November 2026 ‡ National team caps and goals as of 17 November 2023

Mohammed Kesselly "Keka" Kamara (born 31 October 1997) is a Liberian professional footballer who plays as a forward for Liga I club Rapid București.

== Career ==
=== College and amateur ===
==== Tyler Junior College ====
Kamara moved to the United States to play college soccer at Tyler Junior College in 2016. During his two years at Tyler, Kamara scored 70 goals and tallied ten assists in just 44 games. He finished the 2017 season as the NJCAA player of the year after scoring a school record-breaking and NJCAA-leading 48 goals, which included 14 game-winners.

==== UCLA ====
In 2018, Kamara transferred to UCLA, where he made 14 appearances, scored five goals, and tallied a single assist.

==== Atlanta Silverbacks ====
During his time at college, Kamara also appeared for National Premier Soccer League side Atlanta Silverbacks, where he scored nine goals in 14 appearances.

=== Professional ===
==== SC Paderborn 07 ====
Kamara was considered a strong candidate to sign a Generation Adidas deal with Major League Soccer, which would see him enter the 2019 MLS SuperDraft. However, he opted to move to Europe, signing with 2. Bundesliga side SC Paderborn on 5 January 2019.

During his time at Paderborn, Kamara failed to make a single first team appearance, but did score eight goals in seven appearances for Paderborn's 5th-tier second team who competed in the Oberliga Westfalen.

In June 2019, Kamara and Paderborn mutually agreed to terminate his contract with the club.

==== LA Galaxy II ====
On 2 August 2019, Kamara signed for USL Championship side LA Galaxy II. He made his professional debut on 11 August 2019, as an 84th-minute substitute during a 3–1 win over Austin Bold.

=== Menemenspor ===
On 1 October 2020, Kamara moved to Turkish TFF First League side Menemenspor.

== Career statistics ==
=== Club ===
As of match played 7 November 2026

Appearances and goals by club, season and competition
Club	Season	League			National cup (Note: Includes Turkish Cup, Israel State Cup, Cupa României)		Continental		Other		Total	
Club	Season	Division	Apps	Goals	Apps	Goals	Apps	Goals	Apps	Goals	Apps	Goals
Atlanta Silverbacks	2018	National Premier Soccer League	14	9	—		—		—		14	9
SC Paderborn	2018–19	2. Bundesliga	0	0	0	0	—		—		0	0
SC Paderborn II	2018–19	Oberliga Westfalen	7	8	—		—		—		7	8
LA Galaxy II	2019	USL Championship	9	4	—		—		1 (Note: Appearance in USL Championship Playoffs)	0	10	4
LA Galaxy II	2020	USL Championship	0	0	—		—		0	0	0	0
LA Galaxy II	Total		9	4	—		—		1	0	10	4
Menemenspor	2020–21	TFF 1. Lig	10	4	1	0	—		—		11	4
Hatayspor	2020–21	Süper Lig	21	1	—		—		—		21	1
Hatayspor	2021–22	Süper Lig	23	4	2	0	—		—		25	4
Hatayspor	2022–23	Süper Lig	1	0	—		—		—		1	0
Hatayspor	Total		45	5	2	0	—		—		47	5
Astana (loan)	2022	Kazakhstan Premier League	2	0	—		—		—		2	0
Hapoel Haifa	2022–23	Israeli Premier League	24	5	2	0	—		1 (Note: Appearances in Toto Cup)	1	27	6
Hapoel Haifa	2023–24	Israeli Premier League	28	6	2	0	—		4	2	34	8
Hapoel Haifa	Total		52	11	4	0	—		5	3	61	14
CFR Cluj	2024–25	Liga I	31	8	4	3	2 (Note: Appearances in UEFA Conference League)	0	—		23	0
CFR Cluj	2025–26	Liga I	2	0	0	0	2 (Note: Appearances in UEFA Europa League)	0	1 (Note: Appearance in Supercupa României)	0	5	0
CFR Cluj	Total		33	8	4	3	4	0	1	0	42	11
Rapid București	2026–27	Liga I	12	2	1	1	—		—		13	3
Career total			184	51	12	4	4	0	7	3	207	58

=== International ===
As of matches played on 17 November 2023

Appearances and goals by national team and year
National team	Year	Apps	Goals
Liberia	2023	4	1
Total		4	1

Scores and results list Liberia's goal tally first, score column indicates score after each Kamara goal.

List of international goals scored by Mohammed Kamara
No.	Date	Venue	Opponent	Score	Result	Competition
1	14 October 2023	Stade du Phosphate, Khouribga, Morocco	Libya	1–1	2–3	Friendly

== Honours ==
CFR Cluj

- Cupa României: 2024–25
- Supercupa României runner-up: 2025
