= CFR Cluj =

Association football club in Romania

- Full name: SC Fotbal Club CFR 1907 Cluj SA
- Nicknames: Ceferiștii (The CFR People); Clujenii (The Cluj People); Feroviarii (The Railwaymen); Alb-vișinii (The White and Burgundies); Echipa din Gruia (The Team from Gruia); Campioana Provinciei (The Provincial Champion)
- Short name: CFR
- Founded: 10 November 1907; 118 years ago (as Kolozsvári Vasutas Sport Club)
- Ground: Dr. Constantin Rădulescu
- Capacity: 22,198
- Owner: Ioan Varga (Note: In 2017, businessman Marian Băgăcean purchased 62% stake in CFR Cluj. However, starting from that year, press generally acknowledges Ioan Gheorghe "Neluțu" Varga as the de facto owner of the club.)
- President: Hendrik Klein
- Head coach: Marius Șumudică
- League: Liga I
- 2025–26: Liga I, 3rd of 16
- Website: cfr1907.ro
Home colours	Away colours	Third colours

Fotbal Club CFR 1907 Cluj, commonly known as CFR Cluj (Romanian pronunciation: [t͡ʃefeˌre ˈkluʒ] or [ˌt͡ʃefere ˈkluʒ]) or simply CFR, is a Romanian professional football club based in the city of Cluj-Napoca, Cluj County, that competes in the Liga I. Founded in 1907 as Kolozsvári Vasutas Sport Club, when Transylvania was part of Austria-Hungary, the club takes its current name from the acronym for Căile Ferate Române ("Romanian Railways").

CFR Cluj first competed in the Romanian top flight in the 1946–47 season, but was relegated at the end of the following campaign. Aside from another spell in the top division between 1969 and 1976, the club spent most of the twentieth century in the lower leagues. Following its return to the Liga I in 2004, CFR made its European debut in the 2005 UEFA Intertoto Cup, finishing as joint runners-up. With substantial financial backing from then-owner Árpád Pászkány, CFR won its first national championship in the 2007–08 season, ending a 17-year period of dominance by teams based in Bucharest. It subsequently won further domestic honours and established a regular presence in European competitions.

After financial difficulties and a change of ownership in the mid-2010s, CFR embarked on a successful run, claiming five consecutive league titles between 2017 and 2022. All 17 of its major domestic trophies have come in the twenty-first century, comprising eight Liga I titles, five Cupa României, and four Supercupa României. In European competitions, the club has reached the group stage of the UEFA Champions League and Europa League three times each, and that of the Conference League twice.

CFR shares a local rivalry with Universitatea Cluj, which was considered the city's leading football club before "the White-Burgundies" rose to prominence. CFR also developed rivalries with other Romanian teams, particularly FCSB, with which it has frequently competed for the Liga I title in recent years.

== History ==
=== Establishment and first decades (1907–1969) ===
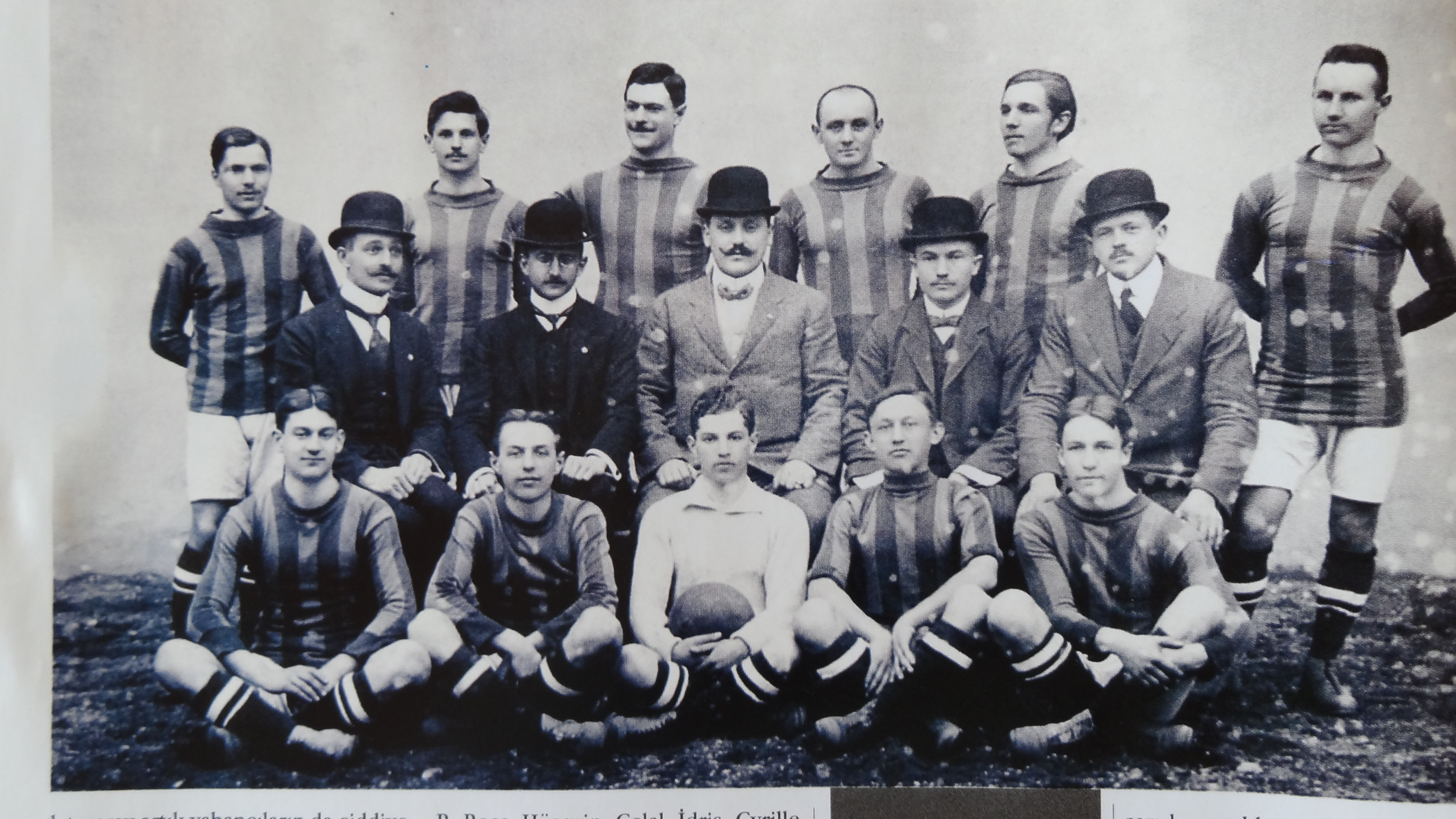
Kolozsvári Vasutas Sport Club team in 1911.

CFR was founded in 1907, when the city of Cluj-Napoca (then Kolozsvár) was part of Austria-Hungary, under the name Kolozsvári Vasutas Sport Club ("Kolozsvár Railway Sports Club"). From 1907 to 1910, the team played in the municipal championship. However, the club did not have any notable achievements during this time. In 1911, the team won the newly organized Championship of Transylvania. The club consistently finished in second place in that competition between 1911 and 1914, a competition that was interrupted because of World War I. After the war, Transylvania joined Romania and the club accordingly changed its name to CFR Cluj, maintaining its links with the national rail organisation, this time the Romanian state railway carrier, Căile Ferate Române, hence the acronym. They went on to win two regional titles, in 1918–19 and 1919–20.

Between 1920 and 1934 the club did not have any notable achievements. Between 1934 and 1936, CFR played for two seasons in the Divizia B, ranking sixth in the 1934–35 season and eighth in the 1935–36 season. In 1936, CFR was relegated to the Divizia C, where the team played for two seasons, finishing second and 4th, respectively. After World War II, CFR played for one season in the Divizia C, earning the promotion to the Divizia B. Before the start of the 1947–48 season, the team merged with another local club, Ferar Cluj, and played in the Divizia A for the very first time in history. Unfortunately, the team lasted only two years in the first league and would not play there again for another 20 years. In 1960, another merger, this time with Rapid Cluj resulted in CSM Cluj. In 1964, the team's name was changed to Clujeana. In that same year, the club's junior team won the national championship. Three years later, the team's name was reversed yet again to CFR Cluj.

=== Second spell in the top flight (1969–1976) ===
Chart depicting the yearly positions of CFR in the national leagues between 1943 and 2017.

In 1969, CFR finished first in Divizia B with 40 points, five more than their rival, Politehnica Timișoara. The conclusive game of that season was a 1–1 draw with Politehnica. Politehnica had a 1–0 lead at half-time, but CFR came back with a fine header.

During the summer of 1969, CFR Cluj advanced to Divizia A under the leadership of coach Constantin Rădulescu. Rădulescu was originally from southern Romania, but he grew to manhood in the atmosphere of Transylvania. Before coaching, he had played for CFR and another well-known local team, Universitatea Cluj (or U Cluj), during the 1940s. In the 1969–70 first league championship, CFR made its debut with a 2–0 victory over ASA Târgu Mureș. The next few games did not go as well; although there was a 1–0 win to Politehnica Iași, there were 2 losses to Steaua București (1–3) and Dinamo București (0–2). These and other defeats were a factor in the team's supposed downhill slide. However, the following spring CFR bounced back with a win over ASA Târgu Mureș (1–0), after a goal from Octavian Ionescu, and averted relegation.

At the beginning of CFR's second season in Divizia A, Rădulescu was replaced by Eugen Iordache as head coach. During his tenure, CFR did not do well, and Rădulescu was swiftly brought back. Even so, CFR Cluj found itself again at the bottom of the table before the winter break. The spring of 1971 was somewhat better, although CFR struggled again to avoid relegation. CFR's last game of that season, against UTA Arad, was a memorable one. CFR led 1–0 at half-time. UTA Arad, however, overturned the match after scoring twice. Nonetheless, the persistence of the players from Cluj was rewarded with a late goal, tying the game at 2–2. UTA went on to play in the European Cups, but, most importantly, CFR avoided relegation.

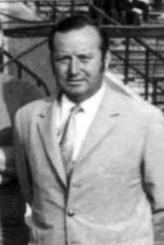
Constantin Rădulescu, the pivotal coach of the club during the 1970s.

The 1971–72 season started off badly for CFR. Losses to Dinamo București (1–3); Crișul Oradea (0–1, after a last-minute penalty kick), and Jiul Petroșani (1–2 after two regrettable own-goals) meant CFR's demise after the first round of the championship – the team finished at the bottom, with only seven points. CFR's return was dramatic, although inconsistent at times. The team won some important games, such as a 1–0 with Universitatea Craiova and a 3–0 with Petrolul Ploiești. By the end of the season, however, CFR was again struggling to stay in Divizia A. CFR was tied at half-time after having led with 2–0 in their game against Politehnica Iași. In the second half, two late goals from Ionescu and Petrescu saved the team from relegation. When Rădulescu and his players got back home to Cluj, 3,000 fans turned out to celebrate their performance.

During the summer of 1972, CFR made an important transfer. Mihai Adam, from Universitatea Cluj, was traded for Soos. Adam had been twice Romania's top scorer, and was considered one of the best Romanian players of his generation. He and the rest of the team would make the 1972–73 season the most successful in CFR's history. The team achieved its highest ranking ever in Romanian football, fifth in Divizia A. Several important results concluded a great season, including a 2–0 victory against Rapid București, a 2–2 draw against Sportul Studențesc București, and another draw, 1–1, with Steaua București. Additionally, the stadium that CFR continues to use even today was built in 1973. To celebrate the completion of the stadium, CFR Cluj played a friendly game against Cuba. The game ended in a 2–1 victory for CFR.

The 1973–74 season was a rather bad one for CFR, as it barely saved itself from relegation, ranking 14th at the end of the season. The only notable achievement of that season was Mihai Adam's third title as Romania's top goal-scorer who, even though he was 33 years old, scored 23 goals. The 1974–75 season was much like the one before: CFR struggled to avoid relegation, achieving its objectives all the while. The 1975–76 season marked CFR's relegation and its last season in Divizia A during the 20th century. A contributing negative factor was the age of the team, with most of its players in their 30s.

=== Return to the lower leagues (1976–2002) ===
During the 1977–78 season, CFR attempted to make a comeback. However, the team finished only second in Divizia B, after Baia Mare. Four years later, CFR slid further down, into the third division, Divizia C. From then on, the team would alternate between the second and third leagues. In the 1982–83 season, CFR won Series X of Divizia C and promoted to Divizia B under its longstanding coach, Dr. Constantin Rădulescu, with a squad that included Paniță, Fereștean, Oltean, H. Popa, Olariu, Toth, A. Mureșan, Tuță, Jucău, Pop, Rău, Furnea, O. Mureșan, Țegean, Tatu, Sipoș, Rus, I. Popa, Csudom, and Berindei. In the 1990s, CFR struggled financially and found itself more than once on the brink of bankruptcy. Nevertheless, several very talented players were raised, including Cristian Dulca, Attila Piroska, Cristian Coroian, and Alin Minteuan.

=== Pászkány takeover, European debut, and first trophies (2002–2012) ===
In January 2002, a new sponsor, Árpád Pászkány, head of S.C. ECOMAX M.G., founded a new commercial sport society, with ECOMAX M.G. as the primary shareholder. By the end of the 2001–02 season in Divizia C, CFR had been promoted back to Divizia B (later on Liga II).

The summer of 2003 was very important for CFR as many new talented players were transferred including Cătălin Bozdog, Adrian Anca, Cristian Turcu, and Sabin Pîglișan. With these players and others, CFR entered the first league after a successful season in Divizia B. CFR began the season strongly, holding first place for a while. Then the club's main sponsor, Árpád Pászkány, became involved in a public scandal during which Pászkány accused several referees of corruption. The affair plagued the team and resulted in the dismissal of head coach George Ciorceri.

CFR lost several consecutive games before the scandal subsided. After the winter break, Cioceri was replaced by Aurel Șunda. In the spring of 2004, Sunda's team had a nearly perfect run, winning 14 out of 15 games, with only one draw. One round before the season's end, CFR was in second place, one point behind the Jiul Petroșani in first. But when Jiul was held to a draw by Gaz Metan Mediaș, and CFR won their last match 3–0, CFR advanced to the top of the league for the first time in 28 years. In the summer of 2004, CFR acquired many new valuable Romanian players, including Vasile Jula and Radu Marginean.

CFR Cluj's first year back in Divizia A was strong, yet inconsistent. CFR finished sixth after the first half of the 2004–05 championship. It was during this time that CFR played one of its most popular games ever, defeating Dinamo București at home. The final score was 4–2, after two goals each by Adrian Anca and Sorin Oncică. However, the second half of the championship proved disappointing for CFR, as it gathered only 12 points after 15 games. The team finished 11th, avoiding relegation.

The summer of 2005 brought significant change to CFR Cluj. The club's executives signed the team up for the UEFA Intertoto Cup, being CFR's first European adventure. CFR began well, qualifying for the second round after two victories against FK Vetra (3–2 and 4–1).

Also, the Romanian international Dorinel Munteanu came to CFR from Steaua București. Munteanu would have the dual role of player-coach. His first game produced one of CFR's greatest successes. CFR defeated Athletic Bilbao of Spain 1–0 (although almost all players from Bilbao's side were from the reserve squad) during the second round of the 2005 UEFA Intertoto Cup. The only goal of the match was scored by Cosmin Tilincă with a header. CFR then lost in Bilbao (1–0) but still qualified to the next round after a penalty shootout.

Munteanu's team played the next game at Cluj, against French club Saint-Étienne. Adrian Anca played one of the greatest games in his career, even though the match ended in a 1–1 draw. Anca hit the crossbar with a header early in the game, and Tilincă pushed the ball into the net from the rebound. Anca then went on to earn a penalty, but did not score. He then hit the crossbar a second time in the second half. The away game, in France, was also an eventful game for CFR Cluj. The game began well for CFR, as Cristian Coroian scored from a penalty kick, earned by Adrian Anca. The second half went less smoothly for CFR; Julien Sablé scored for Saint-Étienne, tying the game at 1–1. This was followed by CFR player László Balint's elimination. However, a Cosmin Tilincă goal gave the team the ability to tie with the French at the last minute. The game ended in a 2–2 draw, so CFR went on to the next qualifying stage due to its away goals. In the next round CFR easily disposed of Zalgiris Vilnius, 2–1 in Lithuania and 5–1 at home.

For the final match of the 2005 UEFA Intertoto Cup, CFR Cluj's opponent was another French franchise, RC Lens. The first game, at Cluj, ended in a 1–1 draw with both sides having scored from free kicks. Cristian Turcu scored for CFR. The second game was played at Lens in front of 30,000 French fans. The Romanian players showed signs of exhaustion and conceded three goals. Player-coach Dorinel Munteanu scored a goal from a free kick in the 89th minute. Thus ended CFR Cluj's Intertoto journey. CFR then finished fifth at the end of the 2005–06 domestic season. During the 2006–07 season, major changes at the club started to occur. Dorinel Munteanu resigned as player-coach, and was replaced by Cristiano Bergodi. Foreign players from Western Europe and South America were transferred. A partnership with Portuguese club Benfica was signed. On 22 July 2007, CFR Cluj celebrated its centenary year by playing a friendly game against Benfica and inaugurating the new illumination system at its stadium.

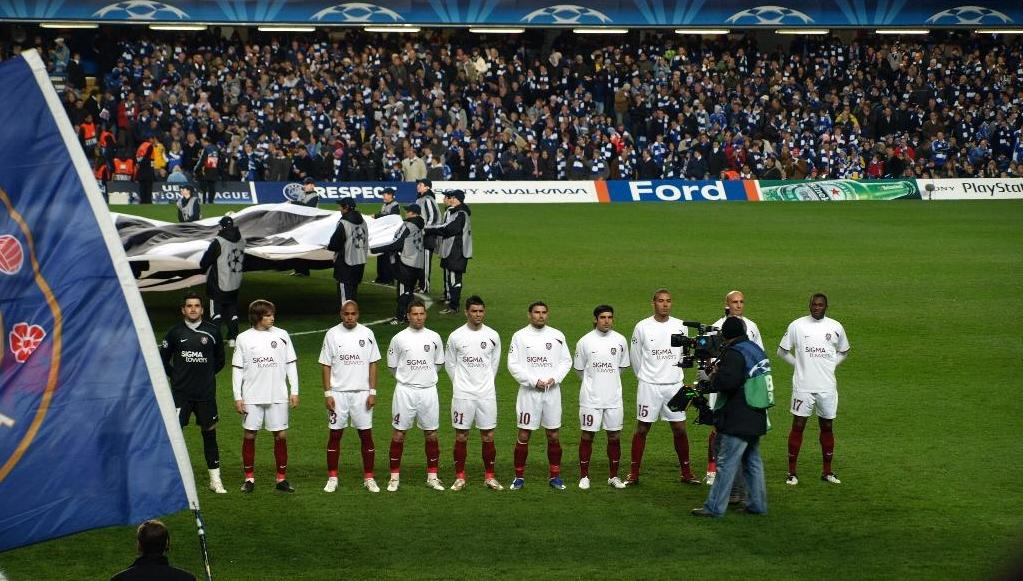
CFR Cluj's players lining up at Stamford Bridge before a duel with Chelsea, December 2008.

The team's new coach, Romanian Ioan Andone, formerly of Omonia Nicosia and Dinamo București, started the 2007–08 season well, with CFR Cluj leading the league by eight points halfway through the season and remaining undefeated. Their form was not as good in the second half of the season, and they were overtaken by Steaua București with two games remaining. Even though Steaua crushed Gloria Buzau 5–0 in the last matchday, it was not enough to bring the title to Ghencea, since CFR won the derby against Universitatea Cluj and won the title, becoming the first team outside Bucharest to win the title in nearly two decades. Three days later, CFR Cluj completed a league and cup double, beating Unirea Urziceni in the Romanian Cup final.

By winning the league, CFR Cluj qualified for the group stage of the 2008–09 UEFA Champions League season. They were drawn in Group A against Chelsea of England, A.S. Roma of Italy, and Bordeaux of France and given little chance of progressing, with odds of 300–1 being given on them winning the competition. In their opening game, CFR caused a shock by beating Roma in the Italian capital, 2–1, with Argentine Juan Culio scoring the brace. Expectations were further exceeded by holding the previous season's finalists, Chelsea, to a 0–0 draw.

The end of the 2008–09 season saw CFR finish fourth; the team had two coaching staff changes in the second part of the competition and did not manage to secure a second title. The Romanian Cup was kept for a consecutive year at Cluj, and thus they played against Unirea Urziceni (the Liga I champions that season) in the Supercupa României. CFR became the first club not from Bucharest to claim the trophy in 2009.

In the 2009–10 season, the team won the league title for the second time in its history, exhibiting the heavy investments in the club's infrastructure, management, and squad transfers. Managed by coach Andrea Mandorlini, CFR Cluj also kept the Romanian Cup and qualified for the UEFA Champions League group stage. As a premier, the 2009–2010 CFR Fans' Trophy was awarded to Cristian Panin as voted by supporters and football reviewers. The trophy is to be awarded every year by the CFR Cluj fans associations to the player that receives the highest aggregate number of votes online and highest per match rating respectively. The 2010–11 CFR Fans' Trophy was awarded to captain Ricardo Cadú and the 2011–2012 CFR Fans' Trophy was awarded to goalkeeper Beto Pimparel.

The 2011–12 season brought the league title to Cluj for the third time. Starting under Jorge Costa's supervision, the team maintained a spot in the top three. After a few major defeats close to the end of the season, Costa was replaced by Ioan Andone. Under Andone, CFR won all the remaining matches except for one draw, and finished first. Later that year, FC Dinamo București defeated CFR Cluj in the Romanian Supercup with 6–4 after penalties, handing them their first defeat in a final.

=== Financial difficulties (2012–2017) ===
After 2012, poor management saw the club go through a sharp decline, finishing 9th in the 2012–13 season, though in the Champions League they performed admirably, finishing 3rd on goal difference in a group with Manchester United, Galatasaray and SC Braga with 10 points, a record still standing for a Romanian team. Their Champions League campaign culminated in a 1–0 away win at Old Trafford against Manchester United, with a long shot from Luis Alberto. They were drawn against Inter Milan in Europa League, where they were eliminated 5–0 on aggregate.

CFR had a quiet 2013–14 season, finishing 5th and earning a Europa League berth, mainly due to the fact that 4th placed Dinamo filed for insolvency and thus were ineligible for European competitions. During this time owner Pászkány faced legal charges and neglected the team, which lead to serious financial difficulties that would culminate in the following seasons.

CFR Cluj began the 2014–15 season well, but financial difficulties led to insolvency which subsequently started a period of poor performances. After failing to fully remunerate five former club players, the Romanian Football Federation decided to deduct 24 points from CFR, which placed them in the last position in Liga I. Many players left the club as a result, and Ceferiștii challenged the Federation's decision to the Court of Arbitration for Sport. In May 2015 the Court ruled in their favour, restoring the deducted points, which helped the team secure a third-place finish in the league championship. CFR Cluj won the 2016 Cupa României final played against Dinamo București after penalty shootouts, being their first trophy since 2012.

=== Five consecutive league titles and European competitions (2017–present) ===
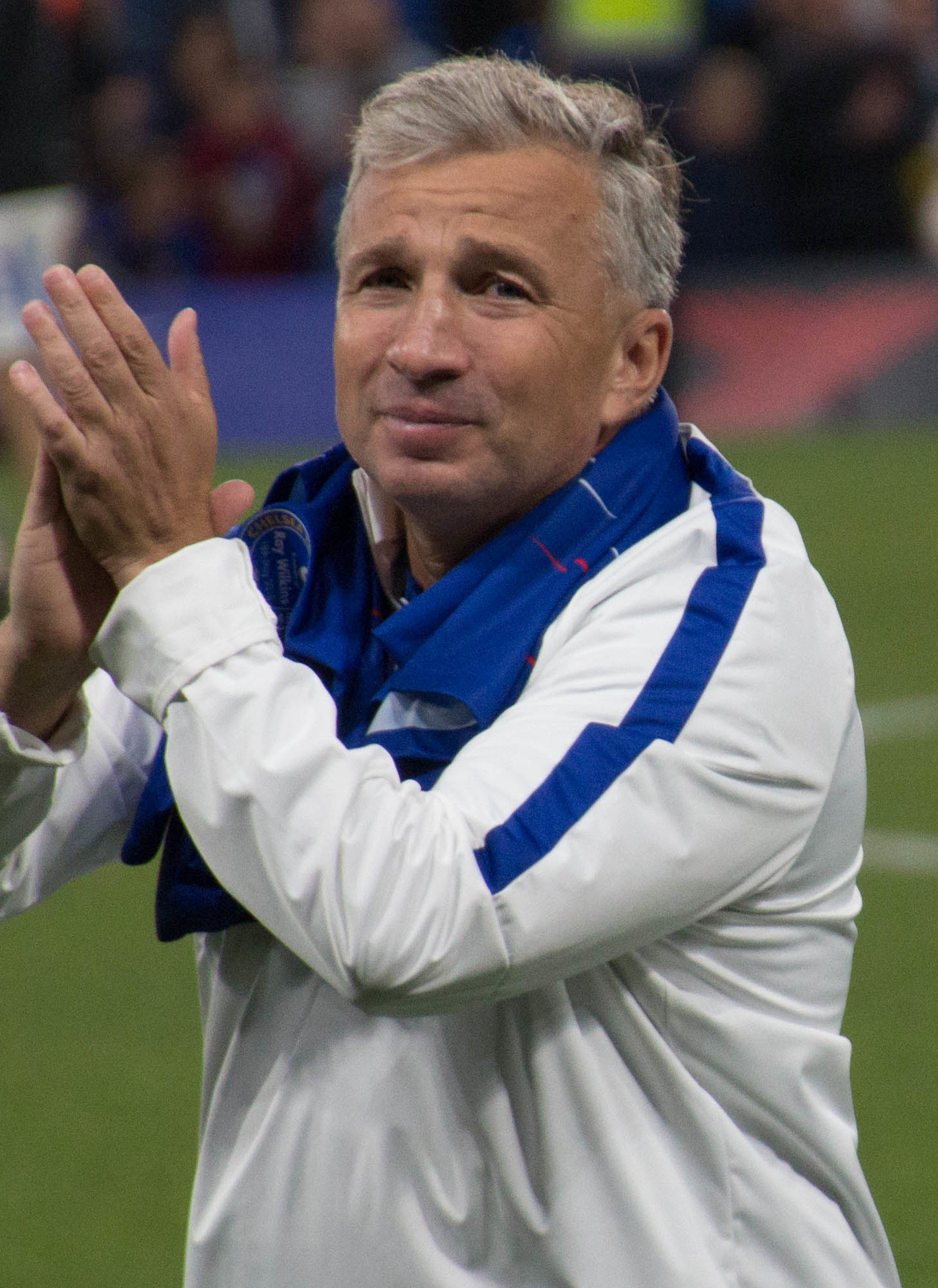
Dan Petrescu led the club to the 2017–18, 2019–20, and 2021–22 league titles. He partially managed them in the 2018–19 and 2020–21 Liga I seasons as well, which CFR also won.

In early 2017, businessman Marian Băgăcean purchased 62% stake in the club in early 2017. After finishing the 2016–17 Liga I campaign on the fourth place the same year on 30 May, CFR Cluj finally got out of insolvency and could participate in European competitions starting with the 2018–19 season again. In June 2017, Dan Petrescu replaced Vasile Miriuță as the head coach of the team, with the goal of a European cup return and an ambitious transfer campaign to support it.

On 20 May 2018, "the Railwaymen" won 1–0 over defending champions Viitorul Constanța and clinched their fourth Liga I title as they finished one point above FCSB in the table. CFR also came victorious in the subsequent 2018 Supercupa României played against Universitatea Craiova, this time under the management of coach Edward Iordănescu. However, Iordănescu was replaced after just three games and Toni Conceição was brought back for his third term as a manager. The club's European campaign was cut short after Luxembourgish side F91 Dudelange won the UEFA Europa League play-off round 5–2 on aggregate; due to Dudelange's underdog status, daily newspaper Gazeta Sporturilor regarded CFR's elimination as "the biggest shame in the history of Romanian football".

In May 2019, again under the management of Dan Petrescu, "The Railwaymen" earned their fifth Liga I title. Unlike the previous year, the club had a fruitful run in European competitions. After getting past Astana and Maccabi Tel Aviv, CFR Cluj defeated Scottish team Celtic in the Champions League third qualifying round. In the play-off they met Slavia Prague, but lost both matches 0–1 and were sent to the Europa League group stages. There, CFR were drawn against Lazio, Rennes and again Celtic. They finished second behind the latter and earned a total of twelve points in the group, a Romanian record in European competitions. In the round of 32, CFR was eliminated by Sevilla on the away goals rule after two draws—the Spaniards went on to win the final 3–2 against Inter Milan, on 21 August 2020. On 3 August, CFR Cluj won the third consecutive title and sixth overall, after a final fixture win over rivals Universitatea Craiova.

CFR started the 2020–21 UEFA Champions League season by beating Maltese side Floriana. They were then eliminated by Croatian side Dinamo Zagreb at home in a penalty shoot-out. Dropping down to the Europa League, they made it to the group stage after defeating Nordic sides Djurgårdens IF and Kuopion Palloseura. Drawn with AS Roma, BSC Young Boys, and CSKA Sofia in Group A, they eventually finished third and were eliminated from the competition from the group stage. During late 2020, Edward Iordănescu became once again coach of the club after the departure of Dan Petrescu. On 18 May 2021, Iordănescu Jr. managed to win the league title of the 2020–21 Liga I season. This was Iordănescu Jr.'s first national title as head coach. In addition, winning the title with CFR thereby allowed the club to play the final of the 2021 Supercupa României (i.e. the Romanian supercup) against Universitatea Craiova, the winners of the 2020–21 Cupa României, which they eventually lost after 2–4 on penalty shoot-out.

Following the end of the season Iordănescu left the club and was replaced by Marius Șumudică. The latter failed to qualify the club for the group stage of either the UEFA Champions League or UEFA Europa League, being consequently dismissed and replaced by the returning Dan Petrescu. Under Petrescu, CFR qualified for the group stage of the inaugural UEFA Europa Conference League, competing in Group D with Dutch side Alkmaar, Czech side Jablonec, and Danish side Randers. The club debuted with an away 1–0 loss at Jablonec nad Nisou in the Czech Republic against FK Jablonec on 16 September 2021 and consequently on the 4th place in the group after the first fixture. In the second fixture however, the club managed to draw 1–1 with Randers FC and thereby gained its first point in the Europa Conference League. After their away match with Randers, which they lost 1–2, CFR were mathematically eliminated from advancing to the Round of 16 and finished in fourth place in Group D of the inaugural UEFA Europa Conference League season. This outcome remained unchanged despite their eventual 2–0 victory in the last home match against Jablonec, which earned them their first three points in the competition, bringing their total to four.

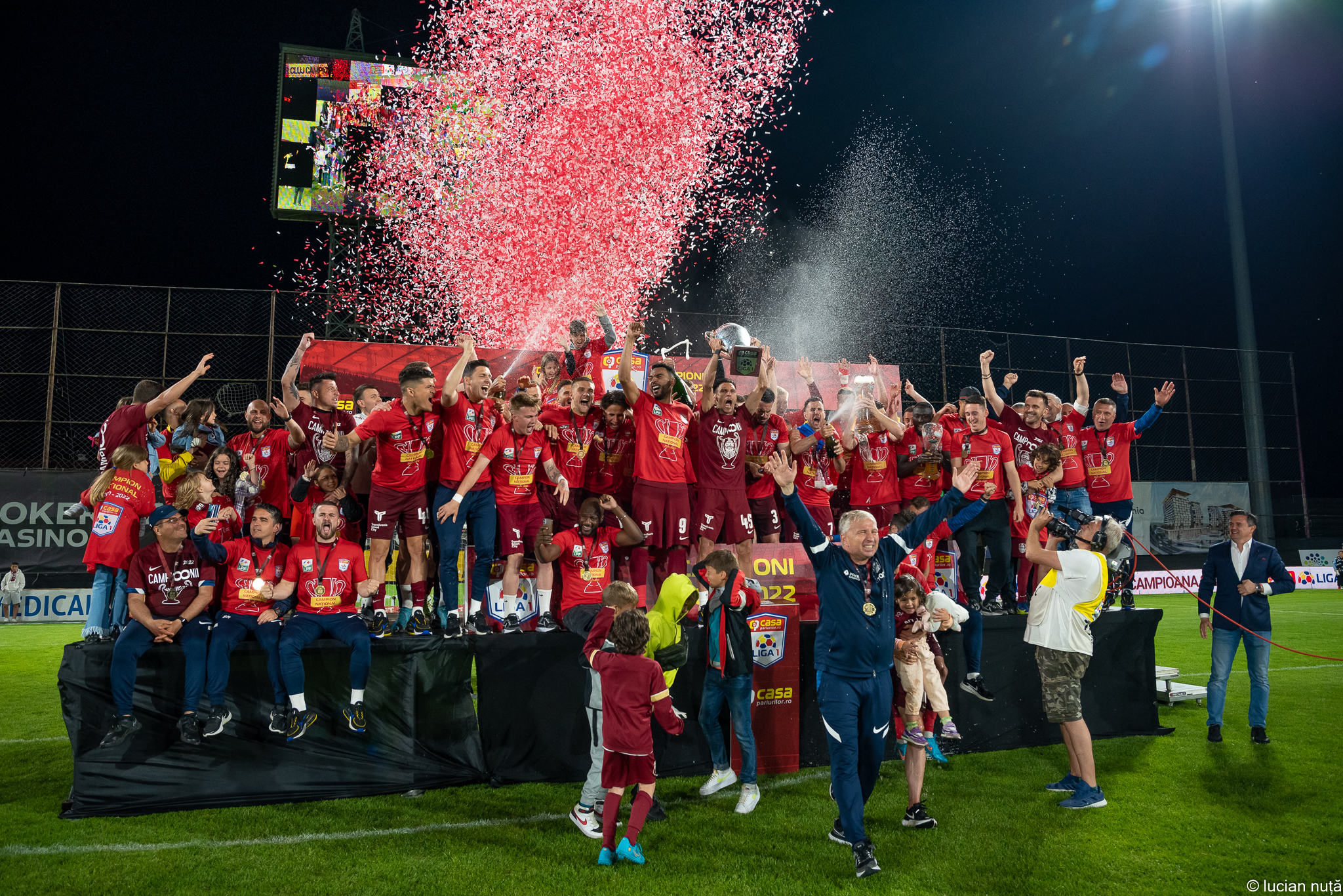
CFR Cluj celebrating their fifth consecutive Liga I title at the end of the 2021–22 season.

While CFR Cluj's European campaign in the 2021–22 season proved to be quite disappointing, the team had an almost flawless domestic season. They secured the top spot in the regular season by accumulating 76 out of 90 possible points, finishing 16 points ahead of the second-place team. During the play-offs, CFR experienced their worst run of form throughout the season, suffering two consecutive defeats against Universitatea Craiova and FCSB, which narrowed the gap between CFR and the latter to just two points. However, CFR swiftly recovered from their setback and embarked on a remarkable winning streak, securing four consecutive victories, including an impressive 6–0 win over FC Argeș. On 14 May, with FCSB's draw against Voluntari, CFR only needed a win in their match against Craiova to clinch the league title, which they accomplished with a 2–1 win. With this triumph, CFR became the team with the most titles won outside the capital (eight) and the only Romanian team in the 21st century to claim five consecutive titles.

== Stadium ==
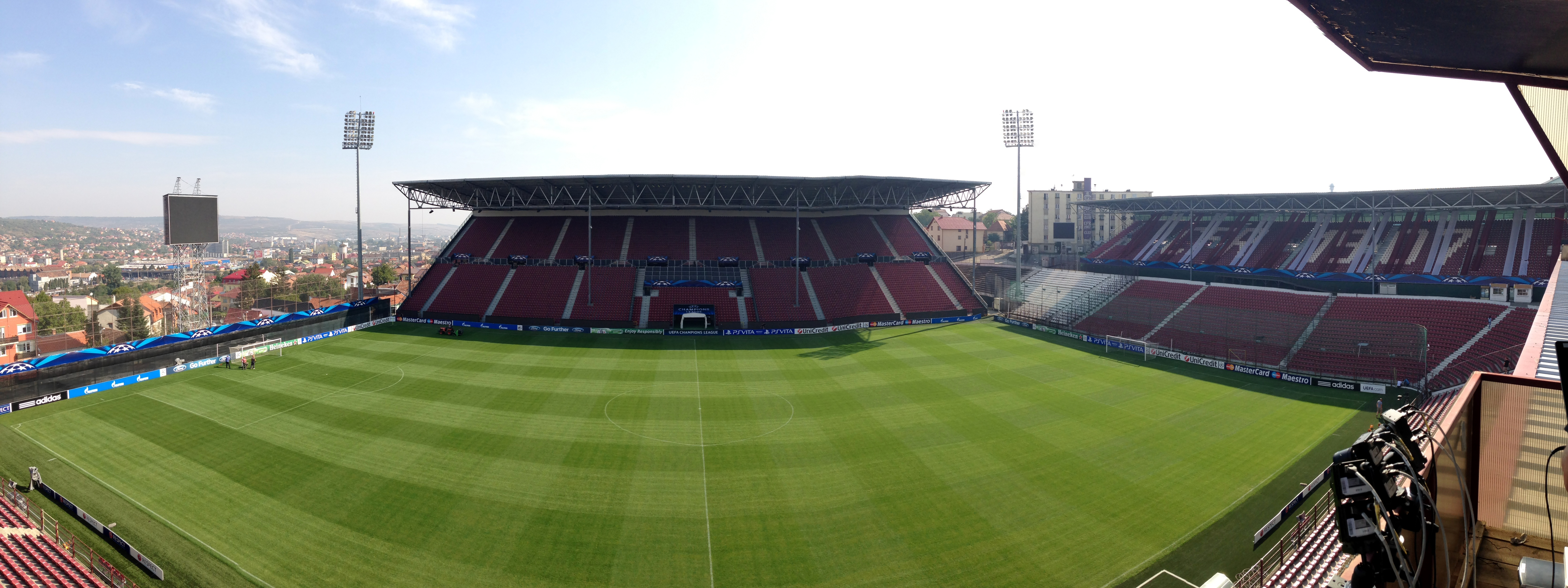
The Dr. Constantin Rădulescu Stadium in 2012

CFR Cluj played its home games on the Stadionul Orășenesc Cluj from 1911 - when it was inaugurated - until 1960, when it was demolished, to make way to Stadionul Ion Moina back then named Stadionul Municipal. On "Municipal", CFR played from 1960 until 1973.

CFR Cluj presently plays nearly all of its home games at the Dr. Constantin Rădulescu Stadium, which was expanded in 2008 to seat a maximum capacity of 23,500. It meets all of UEFA's regulations and can also host Champions League matches. In 2006–07, with an investment of €30 million, the club upgraded the field with higher quality turf, built a state of the art lighting system, and updated its infrastructure. All the work was completed for the club's 100th anniversary in 2007, when a friendly game was played against Portuguese side Benfica.

== Support ==
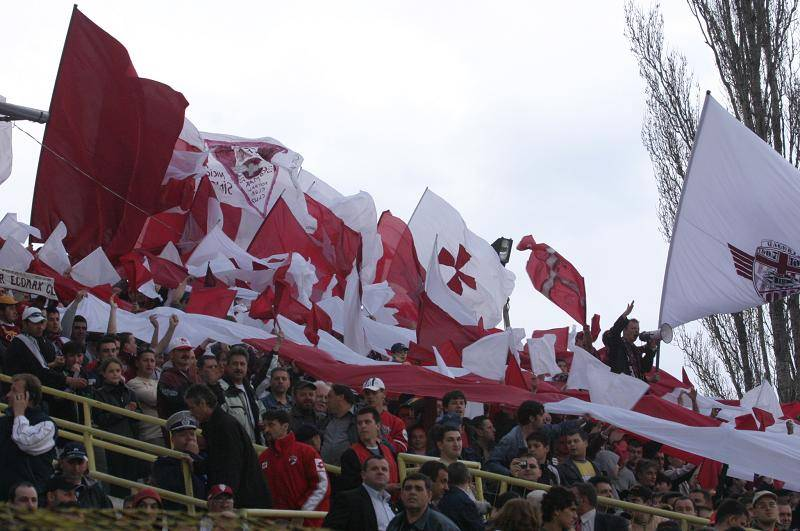
CFR Cluj supporters on 14 August 2006 at a domestic match against FC Dinamo București in Romania

A 2011 survey has shown that CFR Cluj has the fourth-largest number of supporters in Romania. They have many fans in Cluj-Napoca, but also in some other parts of the country. Since the 2014 withdraw of important groups such as "Patriots" and "Commando Gruia", the fans have a single big group called "Peluza Vișinie", which consists of former members of older groups such as "Romaniacs", "Juvenes", "Gruppo Gara", "Valacchi", "Pride 1907", "Nostra Famiglia", and "1907". There is another group of supporters which consists of ethnic Hungarians who currently sit in the Tribuna 1 sector of the stadium. Their group is named KVSK, which is the Hungarian name of CFR. They had such major conflicts with the Romanians ultras group 'Peluza Vișinie' and decided to go to matches alone. Their support is less vocal and visible, but they are a consistent part of the active fans.

=== Rivalries ===
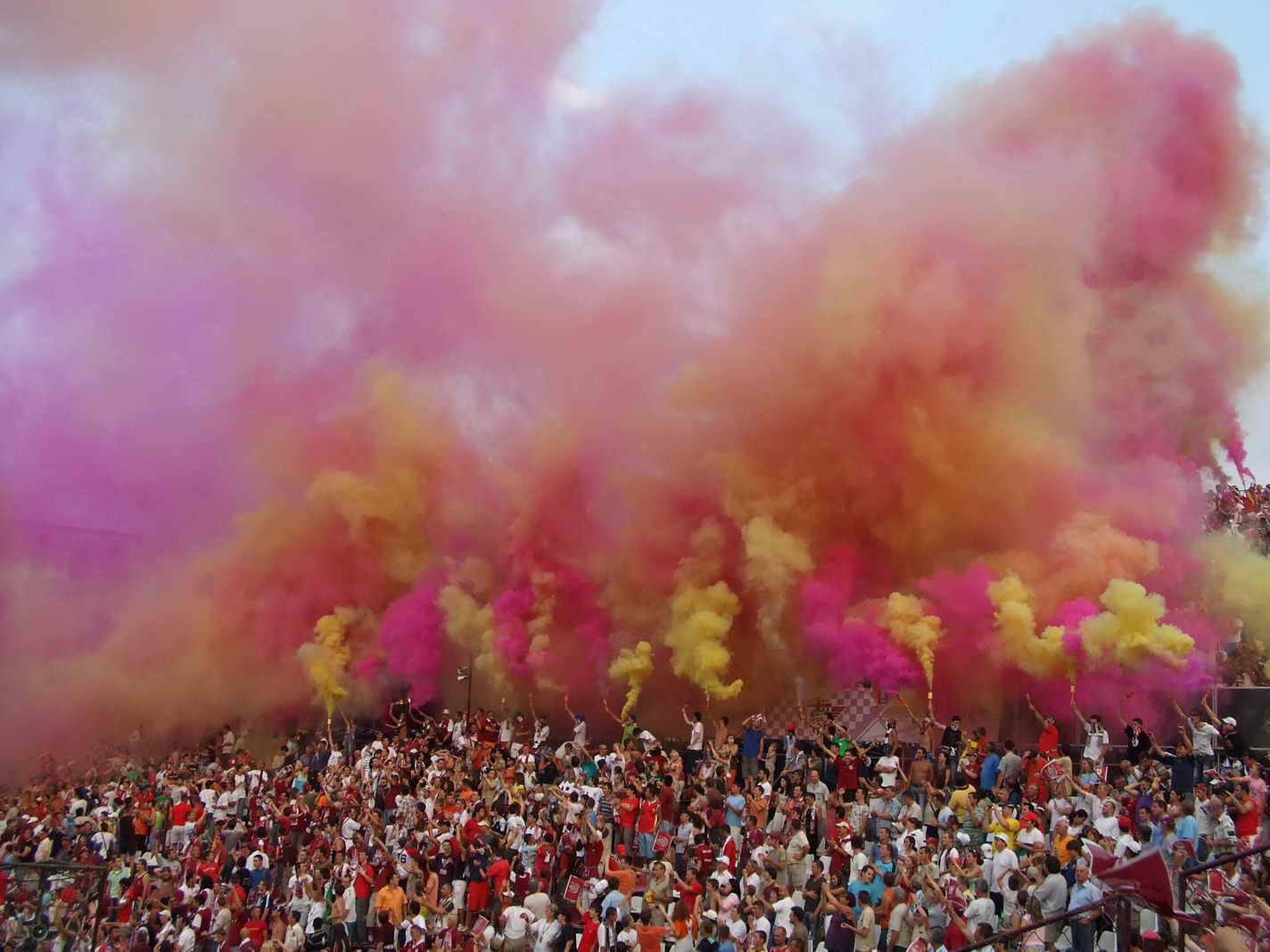
CFR fans at a home game in 2010

CFR Cluj has a fierce rivalry with their local opponents Universitatea Cluj. According to journalist Răzvan Toma, the first match between the two teams was played on 13 October 1920, when CFR thrashed Universitatea 8–0 on a field based in the Central Park. History and statistics website Romanian Soccer regards a 1–3 loss by CFR (which had just merged with Ferar Cluj on 7 December 1947) as the first Liga I meeting between the two teams.

In 2019, Liga Profesionistă de Fotbal's website referred to a match between FCSB—formerly FC Steaua București—and CFR Cluj as "the Romanian Derby", a name generally used for the meetings between the former club and their cross-town rivals Dinamo București. This stems from the fact that after the 2000s CFR and FCSB were often some of the main contenders for the national title, and during the late 2010s the rivalry exacerbated further as Dinamo lost its power status. As of 2023, CFR and FCSB have met each other over 70 times in the first division.

Ceferiștii also hold milder rivalries with Dinamo București, Rapid București, Universitatea Craiova, and Politehnica Timișoara.

== Popular culture ==
CFR Cluj was the subject of a long documentary film directed by Laviniu Lazăr on their 2012–13 UEFA Champions League season and the historical victory over Manchester United at Old Trafford, titled "The Theatre of Dreams" (Romanian: Teatrul Viselor) which was presented at the Film Transilvania (TIFF) festival in 2013.

== Honours ==
=== Domestic ===
==== Leagues ====
- Liga I
  - Winners (8): 2007–08, 2009–10, 2011–12, 2017–18, 2018–19, 2019–20, 2020–21, 2021–22
  - Runners-up (2): 2023–24, 2024–25
- Divizia B / Liga II
  - Winners (2): 1968–69, 2003–04
  - Runners-up (1): 1977–78
- Divizia C / Liga III
  - Winners (7): 1946–47, 1982–83, 1985–86, 1988–89, 1990–91, 1995–96, 2001–02
  - Runners-up (1): 1987–88

==== Cups ====
- Cupa României
  - Winners (5): 2007–08, 2008–09, 2009–10, 2015–16, 2024–25
  - Runners-up (1): 2012–13
- Supercupa României
  - Winners (4): 2009, 2010, 2018, 2020
  - Runners-up (6): 2012, 2016, 2019, 2021, 2022, 2025

=== European ===
- UEFA Intertoto Cup
  - Runners-up (1): 2005 (joint runners-up)

== European statistics ==
Notable wins

Season	Match	Score
UEFA Intertoto Cup
2005	CFR – (Spain) Athletic Bilbao	1 – 0
UEFA Champions League
2008–09	CFR – (Italy) AS Roma	2 – 1
2010–11	CFR – (Switzerland) FC Basel	2 – 1
2012–13	CFR – (Switzerland) FC Basel	1 – 0
2012–13	CFR – (Czech Republic) Slovan Liberec	2 – 1
2012–13	CFR – (Portugal) Braga	3 – 1
2012–13	CFR – (England) Manchester United	1 – 0
2019–20	CFR – (Israel) Maccabi Tel Aviv	1 – 0
2019–20	CFR – (Scotland) Celtic	4 – 3
UEFA Europa League
2009–10	CFR – (Bosnia and Herzegovina) FK Sarajevo	2 – 1
2009–10	CFR – (Denmark) Copenhagen	2 – 0
2019–20	CFR – (Italy) Lazio	2 – 1
2019–20	CFR – (France) Rennes	1 – 0
2019–20	CFR – (Scotland) Celtic	2 – 0
2020–21	CFR – (Sweden) Djurgården	1 – 0
2020–21	CFR – (Bulgaria) CSKA Sofia	2 – 0
UEFA Conference League
2022–23	CFR – (Slovenia) NK Maribor	1 – 0
2022–23	CFR – (Czech Republic) Slavia Prague	2 – 0

== Players ==
=== Current first team squad ===
As of 26 October 2026

Note: Flags indicate national team as defined under FIFA eligibility rules; some limited exceptions apply. Players may hold more than one non-FIFA nationality.

No.	Pos.	Nation	Player
1	GK	ROU	Rareș Gal
3	DF	GEO	Iva Gelashvili
5	MF	URU	Francisco Barrios
6	MF	ROU	Ovidiu Perianu
7	MF	BIH	Adi Nalić
8	MF	ROU	Alin Fică (3rd captain)
9	FW	SRB	Stefan Dražić
10	MF	ROU	Adrian Păun (vice-captain)
11	FW	ROU	Andrei Cordea
14	DF	POR	Simão Rocha
17	FW	ROU	Lorenzo Biliboc
18	MF	AUT	Ervin Omić (on loan from Wisła Kraków)
19	FW	ROU	Sergiu Buș
20	DF	ROU	Alexandru Țîrlea
21	DF	ROU	Cristian Ignat
23	FW	GHA	Amin Ziblim

No.	Pos.	Nation	Player
29	FW	ALG	Billel Omrani
31	GK	ROU	Octavian Vâlceanu
40	DF	MDA	Leo Saca
41	DF	CRO	Anton Krešić
42	DF	CRO	Renato Pantalon
45	DF	ROU	Mário Camora (captain)
47	DF	GER	Christopher Braun (4th captain)
66	MF	ESP	Cristian Perea
70	MF	ROU	Denis Crișan
77	FW	ROU	Andres Sfait
81	GK	ROU	Cătălin Pușcaș
85	DF	ROU	David Avram
93	GK	ROU	Marc Filip
96	GK	ROU	Árpád Tordai
98	FW	MDA	Nicolae Sula
99	FW	BEL	Jelani Trevisan

=== Dual registration ===
Note: Flags indicate national team as defined under FIFA eligibility rules; some limited exceptions apply. Players may hold more than one non-FIFA nationality.

No.	Pos.	Nation	Player
22	MF	ROU	David Miclăuș (at Olimpia Satu Mare)
26	MF	ROU	Răzvan Gligor (at Olimpia Satu Mare)
80	MF	ROU	Cosmin Matei (at Olimpia Satu Mare)

No.	Pos.	Nation	Player
82	FW	ROU	Răzvan Bârstan (at Olimpia Satu Mare)
86	DF	ROU	Viktor Kun (at Olimpia Satu Mare)

=== Other players under contract ===
Note: Flags indicate national team as defined under FIFA eligibility rules; some limited exceptions apply. Players may hold more than one non-FIFA nationality.

No. / Pos. / Nation / Player; 4 / DF / BIH / Ilija Mašić	No. / Pos. / Nation / Player; 33 / DF / KOS / Rion Zejnullahu

=== Out on loan ===
Note: Flags indicate national team as defined under FIFA eligibility rules; some limited exceptions apply. Players may hold more than one non-FIFA nationality.

No.	Pos.	Nation	Player
84	DF	ROU	Alexandru Radu (at CIL Blaj until 30 June 2027)
—	GK	ROU	Adrian Frănculescu (at Corvinul Hunedoara until 30 June 2027)
—	GK	ROU	Mihai Răcășan (at CSM Slatina until 30 June 2027)
—	DF	ROU	Alexandru Ondreykovicz (at Unirea Alba Iulia until 30 June 2027)
—	DF	ROU	Antonio Panin (at Sănătatea Cluj until 30 June 2027)
—	MF	ROU	Cătălin Braicu (at Luceafărul Cluj until 30 June 2027)
—	MF	ROU	Cătălin Man (at Luceafărul Cluj until 30 June 2027)

No.	Pos.	Nation	Player
—	MF	ROU	Ștefan Rusu (at Sănătatea Cluj until 30 June 2027)
—	MF	ROU	Mario Tătar (at Luceafărul Cluj until 30 June 2027)
—	FW	ROU	Tudor Cociș (at Sănătatea Cluj until 30 June 2027)
—	FW	MLI	Moussa Samaké (at ASA Târgu Mureș until 30 June 2027)
—		ROU	Nikholas Bumbui (at Transilvania Sport Academy until 30 June 2027)
—		ROU	Lucas Fechete (at Luceafărul Cluj until 30 June 2027)
—		ROU	Alexandru Graur (at Luceafărul Cluj until 30 June 2027)

== Club officials ==
=== Board of directors ===
Role	Name
Owner	(Romania) Ioan Varga (Note: In 2017, businessman Marian Băgăcean purchased 62% stake in CFR Cluj. However, starting from that year, press generally acknowledges Ioan Gheorghe "Neluțu" Varga as the "real" owner of the club.)
President	(Germany) Hendrik Klein
Executive President	(Romania) Marian Copilu
Vice-president	(Romania) Ciprian Deac
Sporting director	(Portugal) Cadú
Economic Director	(Romania) Simona Baciu
Technical director	(Romania) Mugurel Dan
Marketing Director	(Romania) Tudor Pop
Team Manager	(Romania) Cristian Panin
Head of Youth Development	(Romania) George Galamaz
Director of Youth Development	(Romania) Daniel Huza
Sporting Secretary	(Romania) Iustin Balaj
Responsible for Order and Safety	(Romania) Augustin Goga
Press Officer	(Romania) Oana Sabău

- Last updated: 14 August 2026

=== Current technical staff ===
Role	Name
Head coach	(Romania) Marius Șumudică
Assistant coaches	(Romania) Gabriel Mărgărit (Romania) Cristian Petre
Goalkeeping coach	(Romania) Mihai Ștețca
Video analysts	(Romania) Leonard Toșu (Romania) Marius Șumudică Jr.
Fitness coaches	(Romania) Cristian Dragotă (Romania) Andrei Dăngulea (Romania) Vasile Demeter
Club Doctor	(Romania) Cosmin Traian
Physiotherapists	(Romania) Florin Molnar (Romania) Darius Tămaș
Masseurs	(Romania) Iosif Mureșan (Romania) Bogdan Rus

- Last updated: 14 August 2026

== UEFA club ranking ==
In the table below, the current UEFA club ranking position for CFR Cluj is shown based on its current UEFA coefficient for the ongoing 2026–2027 season.

As of 21 January 2026

Position	Club	Coefficient
116	(Cyprus) APOEL	14.750
**117**	(Romania) **CFR Cluj**	**14.500**
118	(Israel) Maccabi Haifa	14.500

=== All time records ===
- Biggest victory: **CFR Cluj** – Minaur Zlatna 10–0 (4 October 2003)
- Biggest defeat: CFR București – **CFR Cluj** 12–2 (20 April 1949)
- Player with most caps in Liga I: (Romania) (Portugal) Camora (454)
- Player with most goals in Liga I: (Romania) Ciprian Deac (79)
- Biggest European home win: CFR Cluj 5–0 (Armenia) Alashkert (16 August 2018, UEFA Europa League Third qualifying round second leg)
- Biggest European away win: (Lithuania) Vėtra 1–4 CFR Cluj (26 June 2005, UEFA Intertoto Cup First round second leg)
- Biggest European home defeat: CFR Cluj 0–5 (Norway) Tromsø (6 August 2026, UEFA Conference League Third qualifying round first leg)
- Biggest European away defeat: (Sweden) BK Häcken 7–2 CFR Cluj (21 August 2025, UEFA Conference League Play-off round)

=== All time records ===
- Biggest victory: **CFR Cluj** – Minaur Zlatna 10–0 (4 October 2003)
- Biggest defeat: CFR București – **CFR Cluj** 12–2 (20 April 1949)
- Player with most caps in Liga I: (Romania) (Portugal) Camora (452)
- Player with most goals in Liga I: (Romania) Ciprian Deac (79)
- Biggest European home win: CFR Cluj 5–0 (Armenia) Alashkert (16 August 2018, UEFA Europa League Third qualifying round second leg)
- Biggest European away win: (Lithuania) Vėtra 1–4 CFR Cluj (26 June 2005, UEFA Intertoto Cup First round second leg)
- Biggest European home defeat: CFR Cluj 0–4 (Germany) Bayern Munich (19 October 2010, UEFA Champions League group stage)
- Biggest European away defeat: (Sweden) BK Häcken 7–2 CFR Cluj (21 August 2025, UEFA Conference League Play-off round)

=== Other records ===
- Since the 2012–13 season, CFR Cluj holds the record for the most points obtained by any Romanian club in the UEFA Champions League group stages, with **10** points, having recorded 3 wins, 1 draw, and 2 losses.
- CFR Cluj also holds the record for most points scored by any Romanian club in the UEFA Europa League group stages, with **12** points, having recorded 4 wins and 2 losses in the 2019–20 season

=== Domestic history by season ===
Champions	Runners-up	Third place	Promoted	Relegated

The players in bold were the top goalscorers in the division.

Season	League										National Cup	Continental		Other		Top scorer(s)		Notes	Name
Season	**Division (Tier)**		**Pos**	**P**	**W**	**D**	**L**	**GF**	**GA**	**Pts**	National Cup	Continental		Other		**Name**	**Goals**	Notes	Name
(Hungary) Hungarian Football Championship																			Kolozsvári Vasutas SC (KVSC) / Clubul Sportiv Feroviar; Cluj
**1907–08**	District (2)		3rd	4	0	0	4	2	45	**0**	–								Kolozsvári Vasutas SC (KVSC) / Clubul Sportiv Feroviar; Cluj
**1908–09**	District (2)		3rd	8	4	1	3	4	11	**9**	–								Kolozsvári Vasutas SC (KVSC) / Clubul Sportiv Feroviar; Cluj
**1909–10**	District (2)		2nd	4	2	0	2	2	4	**2**	–								Kolozsvári Vasutas SC (KVSC) / Clubul Sportiv Feroviar; Cluj
**1910–11**	Transylvania Ch.		**1st**	4	3	0	1	11	6	**6**	–								Kolozsvári Torna Club (KTC)
**1911–12**	Transylvania Ch.		4th	8	4	1	3	25	10	**9**	–								Kolozsvári Torna Club (KTC)
**1912–13**	Transylvania Ch.		**1st**	12	11	1	0			**23**	–								Kolozsvári Torna Club (KTC)
**1913–14**	Transylvania Ch.		2nd	20						**34**	–								Kolozsvári Torna Club (KTC)
1914–18 Not involved in any competitions due to World War I. In 1918, Transylvania is united with Romania.																			Kolozsvári Torna Club (KTC)
**1918–19**	District		**1st**	6							–								Kolozsvári Torna Club (KTC)
**1919–20**	District		**1st**								–								Kolozsvári Torna Club (KTC)
**1920–21**	District		3rd								–								Kolozsvári Torna Club (KTC)
(Romania) Romanian Football Championship																			CFR Cluj
**1921**	District		2nd	6	3	2	1	10	8	**8**	–								CFR Cluj
**1921–22**	District		6th	14	4	2	8	13	21	**10**	–								CFR Cluj
**1922–23**	District		4th	12	4	4	4	7	14	**12**	–								CFR Cluj
**1923–24**	District		3rd	9	3	2	4	9	15	**8**	–								CFR Cluj
**1924–25**	District		3rd	14	6	3	5	16	12	**15**	–								CFR Cluj
**1925–26**	District		6th	18	9	1	8	36	27	**19**	–								CFR Cluj
**1926–27**	District		6th	10	1	2	7	10	18	**4**	–								CFR Cluj
1927–28 Not involved in any competitions																			CFR Cluj
**1928–29**	District		7th	6	2	0	4	5	8	**4**	–								CFR Cluj
**1929–30**	District		5th	6	2	1	3	10	11	**5**	–								CFR Cluj
1930–31 Not involved in any competitions																			CFR Cluj
**1931–32**	District		3rd	5	2	1	2	7	9	**5**	–								CFR Cluj
**1932–33**	District		2nd								–								CFR Cluj
**1933–34**	District		**1st**					32	4		p								CFR Cluj
**1934–35**	Div B (2)	B3	5th	14	4	3	7	21	27	**11**	p								CFR Cluj
**1935–36**	Div B (2)	B3	8th	14	3	1	10	11	28	**7**	p								CFR Cluj
**1936–37**	Div C (3)	S2N	2nd	10	3	6	1	12	10	**12**	p								CFR Cluj
**1937–38**	Div C (3)	S1N	4th	16	8	4	4	39	25	**20**	p								CFR Cluj
**1938–39**	District (3)		**1st**								p								CFR Cluj
**1939–40**	District (3)		**1st**								p								CFR Cluj
**1940–41**	Div B (2)		–	–	–	–	–	–	–	–	–					–	–		CFR Cluj
(Hungary) Hungarian Football Championship																			Kolozsvári MÁV SE
**1940–41**	District		2nd	8	5	1	2	19	11	**11**	–								Kolozsvári MÁV SE
**1941–42**	Nem II (2)		3rd	26	15	2	9	77	51	**32**	–								Kolozsvári MÁV SE
**1942–43**	Nem II (2)		3rd	18	9	2	7	32	37	**20**	–								Kolozsvári MÁV SE
**1943–44**	Nem II (2)		11th	26	7	7	12	39	49	**21**	–								Kolozsvári MÁV SE
**1944–45**	Nem II (2)		–	–	–	–	–	–	–	–	–					–	–		Kolozsvári MÁV SE
(Romania) Romanian Football Championship																			CFR Cluj
**1945–46**	District		3rd								–								CFR Cluj
**1946–47**	Div C (3)	C7	**1st**	16	15	1	0	56	5	**31**	–								CFR Cluj
**1947–48**	Div B (2)	B4	15th	15	10	0	5	40	28	**20**	p								CFR Cluj
**1947–48**	**Div A (1)**		8th	30	9	10	11	48	52	**28**	R16					(Romania) Anton Fernbach-Ferenczi	15		CFR Cluj
**1948–49**	**Div A (1)**		11th	26	9	5	12	39	67	**23**	R32					(Romania) Ion Candrea	13		CFR Cluj
**1950**	Div B (2)	B2	8th	22	7	5	10	42	34	**19**	p								Locomotiva Cluj
**1951**	Div B (2)	B2	6th	22	9	5	8	37	31	**23**	R32								Locomotiva Cluj
**1952**	Div B (2)	B2	4th	22	7	7	8	29	24	**21**	p								Locomotiva Cluj
**1953**	Div B (2)	B2	3rd	28	14	7	7	48	32	**35**	R32								Locomotiva Cluj
**1954**	Div B (2)	B2	5th	24	10	6	8	33	26	**26**	p								Locomotiva Cluj
**1955**	Div B (2)	B2	7th	26	11	3	12	45	38	**25**	p								Locomotiva Cluj
**1956**	Div B (2)	B1	10th	24	9	3	12	30	41	**21**	R32								Locomotiva Cluj
**1957**	Div B (2)	B1	6th	12	3	2	7	18	28	**8**	–								Locomotiva Cluj
**1957–58**	Div B (2)	B1	14th	26	3	5	18	31	71	**11**	p								CFR Cluj
**1958–59**	Div C (3)	C5	2nd	18	10	3	5	26	17	**23**	R32								CFR Cluj
**1959–60**	Div B (2)	B3	8th	26	11	2	13	33	36	**24**	R32								CFR Cluj
**1960–61**	Div B (2)	B3	8th	26	9	7	10	29	41	**25**	p								CSM Cluj
**1961–62**	Div B (2)	B3	7th	26	10	8	8	32	31	**28**	p								CSM Cluj
**1962–63**	Div B (2)	B3	5th	26	10	7	9	40	30	**27**	p								CSM Cluj
**1963–64**	Div B (2)	B2	11th	26	9	4	13	34	31	**22**	R32								CSM Cluj
**1964–65**	Div B (2)	B2	3rd	26	11	5	10	34	22	**27**	R32								Clujeana Cluj
**1965–66**	Div B (2)	B2	9th	26	7	8	11	31	43	**22**	R16								Clujeana Cluj
**1966–67**	Div B (2)	B2	11th	26	8	7	11	26	35	**23**	p								Clujeana Cluj
1960–67 Amateur Team in District Leagues; Substituted Clujeana Cluj (Div B)																			CFR Cluj
**1967–68**	Div B (2)	B2	5th	26	11	3	12	46	37	**25**	5R					(Romania) **Romulus Petrescu**	**13**		CFR Cluj
**1968–69**	Div B (2)	B2	**1st**	30	16	8	6	57	31	**40**	5R					(Greece) **Giannis Matzourakis**	**15**		CFR Cluj
**1969–70**	**Div A (1)**		14th	30	10	7	13	29	45	**27**	R32					(Romania) Arpad Soos	8		CFR Cluj
**1970–71**	**Div A (1)**		14th	30	9	8	13	37	52	**26**	R32					(Romania) Octavian Ionescu	9		CFR Cluj
**1971–72**	**Div A (1)**		13th	30	9	7	14	27	37	**25**	QF					(Romania) Vasile Șoo	8		CFR Cluj
**1972–73**	**Div A (1)**		5th	30	11	11	8	33	33	**33**	R16					(Romania) Mihai Adam	11		CFR Cluj
**1973–74**	**Div A (1)**		14th	34	11	9	14	40	53	**31**	R32					(Romania) **Mihai Adam**	**23**		CFR Cluj
**1974–75**	**Div A (1)**		15th	34	11	10	13	26	34	**32**	R16					(Romania) Vasile Moga	8		CFR Cluj
**1975–76**	**Div A (1)**		17th	34	9	10	15	30	39	**28**	R32					(Romania) Mihai Adam	9		CFR Cluj
**1976–77**	Div B (2)	B3	9th	34	14	6	14	38	40	**34**	p								CFR Cluj
**1977–78**	Div B (2)	B3	2nd	34	21	8	5	80	21	**50**	p								CFR Cluj
**1978–79**	Div B (2)	B3	4th	34	16	4	14	48	42	**36**	p								CFR Cluj
**1979–80**	Div B (2)	B3	10th	34	14	4	16	47	54	**32**	p								CFR Cluj
**1980–81**	Div B (2)	B3	8th	34	15	4	15	61	48	**34**	p								CFR Cluj
**1981–82**	Div B (2)	B3	17th	34	10	6	18	37	58	**26**	p								CFR Cluj
**1982–83**	Div C (3)	C10	**1st**	30	20	3	7	64	31	**43**	p								Steaua CFR Cluj
**1983–84**	Div B (2)	B3	16th	34	13	2	19	44	52	**28**	p								Steaua CFR Cluj
**1984–85**	Div C (3)	C11	5th	30	14	2	14	37	26	**30**	R32								Steaua CFR Cluj
**1985–86**	Div C (3)	C9	**1st**	30	20	2	8	87	27	**42**	p								Steaua CFR Cluj
**1986–87**	Div B (2)	B3	17th	34	7	8	19	35	56	**22**	p								Steaua CFR Cluj
**1987–88**	Div C (3)	C9	2nd	30	20	3	7	73	29	**43**	p								Steaua CFR Cluj
**1988–89**	Div C (3)	C11	**1st**	30	18	5	7	66	24	**41**	p								Steaua CFR Cluj
**1989–90**	Div B (2)	B3	18th	34	5	10	19	26	66	**20**	R16								Steaua CFR Cluj
**1990–91**	Div C (3)	C11	**1st**	30	20	6	4	77	27	**46**	p					(Romania) **Ilie Lazăr**	**25**		CFR Cluj
**1991–92**	Div B (2)	B3	7th	34	15	5	14	65	52	**35**	p					(Romania) **Ilie Lazăr**	**30**		CFR Cluj
**1992–93**	Div A (2)	S2	15th	34	13	3	18	56	68	**29**	p								CFR Cluj
**1993–94**	Div A (2)	S2	12th	34	12	6	16	53	57	**30**	5R					(Romania) Cristian Coroian (Romania) Dănuț Matei	9		CFR Cluj
**1994–95**	Div A (2)	S2	16th	34	10	7	17	49	67	**37**	4R					(Romania) Cristian Coroian	9		CFR Cluj
**1995–96**	Div B (3)	S4	**1st**	34	26	3	5	96	20	**81**	p					(Romania) **Cristian Coroian**	**31**		CFR Cluj
**1996–97**	Div A (2)	S2	9th	34	14	5	15	43	45	**47**	5R					(Romania) Sorin Oncică	7		CFR Cluj
**1997–98**	Div B (2)	B2	16th	34	11	5	18	41	57	**38**	p								CFR Cluj
**1998–99**	Div C (3)	C4	5th	36	16	8	12	61	55	**56**	p								CFR Cluj
**1999–00**	Div C (3)	C6	10th	30	11	6	13	53	49	**39**	p								CFR Cluj
**2000–01**	Div C (3)	C7	10th	26	10	5	11	37	35	**35**	p								CFR Cluj
**2001–02**	Div C (3)	C8	**1st**	26	21	2	3	60	10	**65**	R32								CFR Cluj
**2002–03**	Div B (2)	B2	6th	28	12	10	6	52	26	**46**	QF					(Romania) Cosmin Tilincă	9		CFR-Ecomax Cluj
**2003–04**	Div B (2)	B3	**1st**	30	21	6	3	75	19	**69**	6R					(Romania) **Adrian Anca**	**24**		CFR-Ecomax Cluj
**2004–05**	**Div A (1)**		11th	30	9	9	12	33	44	**36**	R16					(Romania) Adrian Anca	11		CFR-Ecomax Cluj
**2005–06**	**Div A (1)**		5th	30	14	8	8	36	27	**50**	R32	IT	F			(Romania) Adrian Anca	6		CFR-Ecomax Cluj
**2006–07**	**L1 (1)**		3rd	34	21	6	7	59	32	**69**	R16					(Romania) Cristian Coroian	11		CFR 1907 Cluj
**2007–08**	**L1 (1)**		**1st**	34	23	7	4	52	22	**76**	**W**	UEFA	2QR			(Romania) Eugen Trică	14		CFR 1907 Cluj
**2008–09**	**L1 (1)**		4th	34	16	11	7	44	26	**59**	**W**	UCL	GS	Supercup	**W**	(Burkina Faso) Yssouf Koné	10		CFR 1907 Cluj
**2009–10**	**L1 (1)**		**1st**	34	20	9	5	43	21	**69**	**W**	UEL	GS	Supercup	**W**	(Romania) Cristian Bud	7		CFR 1907 Cluj
**2010–11**	**L1 (1)**		10th	34	11	12	11	50	45	**45**	QF	UCL	GS			(Ivory Coast) Lacina Traoré	7		CFR 1907 Cluj
**2011–12**	**L1 (1)**		**1st**	34	21	8	5	63	31	**71**	R32			Supercup	F	(Greece) Pantelis Kapetanos	12		CFR 1907 Cluj
**2012–13**	**L1 (1)**		9th	34	12	13	9	56	39	**49**	F	UCL	GS			(Portugal) Rui Pedro	7		CFR 1907 Cluj
**2012–13**	**L1 (1)**		9th	34	12	13	9	56	39	**49**	F	UEL	R32			(Portugal) Rui Pedro	7		CFR 1907 Cluj
**2013–14**	**L1 (1)**		5th	34	13	12	9	44	33	**51**	R32					(Romania) Ciprian Deac (Nigeria) Derick Ogbu	6		CFR 1907 Cluj
**2014–15**	**L1 (1)**		3rd	34	16	9	9	49	29	**57**	SF	UEL	3QR	League Cup	R16	(France) **Grégory Tadé**	**18**		CFR 1907 Cluj
**2015–16**	**L1 (1)**		10th	26	9	10	7	31	25	**27**	**W**			League Cup	QF	(Spain) Cristian López	13		CFR 1907 Cluj
**2015–16**	**L1 (1)**		10th	14	6	4	4	25	13	**36**	**W**			Supercup	F	(Spain) Cristian López	13		CFR 1907 Cluj
**2016–17**	**L1 (1)**		4th	26	14	7	5	42	23	**43**	QF			League Cup	QF	(Romania) Cristian Bud	11		CFR 1907 Cluj
**2016–17**	**L1 (1)**		4th	10	3	2	5	8	14	**33**	QF			League Cup	QF	(Romania) Cristian Bud	11		CFR 1907 Cluj
**2017–18**	**L1 (1)**		**1st**	26	18	5	3	42	13	**59**	R32			Supercup	**W**	(Argentina) Emmanuel Culio	8		CFR 1907 Cluj
**2017–18**	**L1 (1)**		**1st**	10	5	5	0	12	6	**50**	R32			Supercup	**W**	(Argentina) Emmanuel Culio	8		CFR 1907 Cluj
**2018–19**	**L1 (1)**		**1st**	26	15	9	2	39	16	**54**	SF	UCL	2QR	Supercup	F	(Romania) **George Țucudean**	**18**		CFR 1907 Cluj
**2018–19**	**L1 (1)**		**1st**	10	7	2	1	15	4	**50**	SF	UEL	PO	Supercup	F	(Romania) **George Țucudean**	**18**		CFR 1907 Cluj
**2019–20**	**L1 (1)**		**1st**	26	15	7	4	51	16	**52**	R32	UCL	PO	Supercup	**W**	(Romania) Ciprian Deac	14		CFR 1907 Cluj
**2019–20**	**L1 (1)**		**1st**	10	7	2	1	17	7	**49**	R32	UEL	R32	Supercup	**W**	(Romania) Ciprian Deac	14		CFR 1907 Cluj
**2020–21**	**L1 (1)**		**1st**	30	19	7	4	51	16	**64**	R32	UCL	2QR	Supercup	F	(Romania) Ciprian Deac	13		CFR 1907 Cluj
**2020–21**	**L1 (1)**		**1st**	10	7	1	2	15	5	**54**	R32	UEL	GS	Supercup	F	(Romania) Ciprian Deac	13		CFR 1907 Cluj
**2021–22**	**L1 (1)**		**1st**	30	24	4	2	48	16	**76**	R32	UCL	3QR	Supercup	F	(Croatia) Gabriel Debeljuh	14		CFR 1907 Cluj
**2021–22**	**L1 (1)**		**1st**	30	24	4	2	48	16	**76**	R32	UEL	PO	Supercup	F	(Croatia) Gabriel Debeljuh	14		CFR 1907 Cluj
**2021–22**	**L1 (1)**		**1st**	10	6	1	3	18	9	**57**	R32	UECL	GS	Supercup	F	(Croatia) Gabriel Debeljuh	14		CFR 1907 Cluj
**2022–23**	**L1 (1)**		3rd	30	20	3	7	54	28	**63**	SF	UCL	1QR			(Curaçao) Rangelo Janga	10		CFR 1907 Cluj
**2022–23**	**L1 (1)**		3rd	10	2	4	4	11	14	**42**	SF	UECL	KPO			(Curaçao) Rangelo Janga	10		CFR 1907 Cluj
**2023–24**	**L1 (1)**		2nd	30	15	8	7	54	29	**53**	QF	UECL	2QR			(Nigeria) **Philip Otele**	**18**		CFR 1907 Cluj
**2023–24**	**L1 (1)**		2nd	10	6	1	3	19	14	**46**	QF	UECL	2QR			(Nigeria) **Philip Otele**	**18**		CFR 1907 Cluj
**2024–25**	**L1 (1)**		2nd	30	14	12	4	56	32	**54**	**W**	UECL	PO	Supercup	F	(Romania) **Louis Munteanu**	**23**		CFR 1907 Cluj
**2024–25**	**L1 (1)**		2nd	10	4	4	2	17	11	**43**	**W**	UECL	PO	Supercup	F	(Romania) **Louis Munteanu**	**23**		CFR 1907 Cluj
**2025–26**	**L1 (1)**		3rd	30	15	8	7	49	40	**53**	QF	UEL	3QR			(Romania) Andrei Cordea	13		CFR 1907 Cluj
**2025–26**	**L1 (1)**		3rd	10	4	4	2	8	7	**43**	QF	UECL	PO			(Romania) Andrei Cordea	13		CFR 1907 Cluj
**2026–27**	**L1 (1)**		4th	2	1	0	1	6	2	**3**	GS	UECL	2QR						CFR 1907 Cluj

== Notable former players ==
The footballers enlisted below have had international cap(s) for their respective countries at junior and/or senior level. Players whose name is listed in bold represented their countries at junior and/or senior level while they played for the club or had a significant number of caps and goals accumulated throughout a certain number of seasons for the club itself as well.

Romania

- (Romania) Mihai Adam
- (Romania) Vasile Alexandru
- (Romania) **Adrian Anca**
- (Romania) Ștefan Balint
- (Romania) Cristian Bălgrădean
- (Romania) **Daniel Bîrligea**
- (Romania) **Mihai Bordeianu**
- (Romania) **Cristian Bud**
- (Romania) **Andrei Burcă**
- (Romania) **Alexandru Chipciu**
- (Romania) Sever Coracu
- (Romania) Cristian Coroian
- (Romania) **Valentin Costache**
- (Romania) Florin Costea
- (Romania) Florin Dan
- (Romania) **Ciprian Deac**
- (Romania) Nicolae Dică
- (Romania) Cristian Dulca
- (Romania) Cristian Fedor
- (Romania) Anton Fernbach-Ferenczi
- (Romania) Lucian Goian
- (Romania) **Otto Hindrich**
- (Romania) **Ovidiu Hoban**
- (Romania) **Ioan Hora**
- (Romania) **Matei Ilie**
- (Romania) Octavian Ionescu
- (Romania) Vasile Jula
- (Romania) Ștefan Kovács
- (Romania) **Ionuț Larie**
- (Romania) **Vasile Maftei**
- (Romania) **Cristian Manea**
- (Romania) **Bogdan Mara**
- (Romania) Alexandru Marc
- (Romania) Mihai Mincă
- (Romania) Alin Minteuan
- (Romania) **Vasile Mogoș**
- (Romania) **Dorinel Munteanu**
- (Romania) **Louis Munteanu**
- (Romania) **Andrei Mureșan**
- (Romania) **Gabriel Mureșan**
- (Romania) Sergiu Negruț
- (Romania) Viorel Nicoară
- (Romania) Sorin Oncică
- (Romania) **Cristian Panin**
- (Romania) **Claudiu Petrila**
- (Romania) **Emil Petru**
- (Romania) **Ionuț Rada**
- (Romania) Gheorghe Rășinaru
- (Romania) **Răzvan Sava**
- (Romania) **László Sepsi**
- (Romania) **Eduard Stăncioiu**
- (Romania) Romeo Surdu
- (Romania) Ion Suru
- (Romania) Cosmin Tilincă
- (Romania) Dorin Toma
- (Romania) **Eugen Trică**
- (Romania) **George Țucudean**
- (Romania) Petru Țurcaș
- (Romania) Cosmin Văsîie
- (Romania) Viorel Vișan

Albania

- (Albania) **Arlind Ajeti**

Algeria

- (Algeria) Islam Slimani

Angola

- (Angola) **Dominique Kivuvu**

Argentina

- (Argentina) **Emmanuel Culio**
- (Argentina) **Sebastián Dubarbier**
- (Argentina) Cristian Fabbiani
- (Argentina) **Sixto Peralta**
- (Argentina) Diego Ruiz

Bolivia

- (Bolivia) **Gualberto Mojica**

Bosnia and Herzegovina

- (Bosnia and Herzegovina) **Mateo Sušić**
- (Bosnia and Herzegovina) **Stojan Vranješ**

Brazil

- (Brazil) Hugo Alcântara
- (Brazil) Júlio Baptista
- (Brazil) **Rafael Bastos**
- (Brazil) Didi
- (Brazil) Edimar
- (Brazil) **André Galiassi**
- (Brazil) Renan Garcia
- (Brazil) Ronny
- (Brazil) **Paulo Vinícius**
- (Brazil) Yuri Matias
- (Brazil) Weldon

Burkina Faso

- (Burkina Faso) **Yssouf Koné**
- (Burkina Faso) Bakary Saré

Canada

- (Canada) **Lars Hirschfeld**

Croatia

- (Croatia) **Saša Bjelanović**
- (Croatia) Lovro Cvek
- (Croatia) **Gabriel Debeljuh**
- (Croatia) **Damjan Đoković**
- (Croatia) Tomislav Gomelt
- (Croatia) **Antonio Jakoliš**
- (Croatia) **Karlo Muhar**

Côte d'Ivoire

- (Ivory Coast) Kevin Boli
- (Ivory Coast) **Emmanuel Koné**
- (Ivory Coast) **Lacina Traoré**
- (Ivory Coast) **Ousmane Viera**

France

- (France) **Bryan Nouvier**
- (France) Michaël Pereira
- (France) Grégory Tadé
- (France) **Tony**
- (France) Kurt Zouma

Gambia

- (The Gambia) **Sheriff Sinyan**

Georgia

- (Georgia (country)) **Giorgi Chanturia**

Ghana

- (Ghana) **Nana Boateng**
- (Ghana) Sulley Muniru
- (Ghana) **Emmanuel Yeboah**

Greece

- (Greece) **Pantelis Kapetanos**
- (Greece) Ioannis Matzourakis
- (Greece) Panagiotis Tachtsidis

Hungary

- (Hungary) **Ádám Lang**

Iceland

- (Iceland) **Rúnar Már Sigurjónsson**

Italy

- (Italy) Roberto De Zerbi
- (Italy) Davide Petrucci
- (Italy) **Felice Piccolo**
- (Italy) Simone Scuffet
- (Italy) Ferdinando Sforzini

Kosovo

- (Kosovo) **Lindon Emërllahu**
- (Kosovo) **Meriton Korenica**
- (Kosovo) **Ermal Krasniqi**

Liberia

- (Liberia) **Mohammed Kamara**

Lithuania

- (Lithuania) **Giedrius Arlauskis**

Mauritania

- (Mauritania) **Aly Abeid**

Moldova

- (Moldova) **Cătălin Carp**

Morocco

- (Morocco) Omar El Kaddouri

Nigeria

- (Nigeria) **Nwankwo Obiora**
- (Nigeria) Philip Otele

Portugal

- (Portugal) André Leão
- (Portugal) **Beto**
- (Portugal) **Cadú**
- (Portugal) **Dani**
- (Portugal) Diogo Valente
- (Portugal) **Ivo Pinto**
- (Portugal) Luís Aurélio
- (Portugal) **Mário Felgueiras**
- (Portugal) Manuel José
- (Portugal) **Nuno Claro**
- (Portugal) Nuno Diogo
- (Portugal) **Rui Pedro**
- (Portugal) **António Semedo**
- (Portugal) **Tiago Lopes**
- (Portugal) Thierry Moutinho

Serbia

- (Serbia) Sead Brunčević
- (Serbia) Svetozar Mijin
- (Serbia) Zoran Milošević

Senegal

- (Senegal) Ibrahima Baldé
- (Senegal) **Modou Sougou**

Spain

- (Spain) Cristian López
- (Spain) Juan Carlos

Sweden

- (Sweden) Alibek Aliyev
- (Sweden) Mikael Dorsin

Tunisia

- (Tunisia) Syam Ben Youssef

Ukraine

- (Ukraine) Yevhen Konoplyanka

Uruguay

- (Uruguay) **Matías Aguirregaray**
- (Uruguay) Jorge Martínez
- (Uruguay) **Álvaro Pereira**

Venezuela

- (Venezuela) **Mario Rondón**

== Notable former managers ==
- (Romania) Ioan Andone
- (Italy) Cristiano Bergodi
- (Romania) Sorin Cârțu
- (Portugal) Toni Conceição
- (Portugal) Jorge Costa
- (Romania) Petre Grigoraș
- (Romania) Edward Iordănescu
- (Romania) Ștefan Kovács
- (Italy) Andrea Mandorlini
- (Romania) Dorinel Munteanu
- (Romania) Dan Petrescu
- (Romania) Constantin Rădulescu
- (Romania) Mircea Rednic
- (Portugal) Paulo Sérgio
- (Romania) Marius Șumudică
- (Romania) Aurel Șunda
- (Czech Republic) Dušan Uhrin Jr.
