= 2005 UEFA Intertoto Cup =

Tournament details
- Dates: 18 June 2005 – 23 August 2005
- Teams: 61

Final positions
- Champions: (France) Lens (France) Marseille (Germany) Hamburg

Tournament statistics
- Matches played: 116
- Goals scored: 321 (2.77 per match)
- Attendance: 962,158 (8,294 per match)

The 2005 UEFA Intertoto Cup finals were won by Lens, Marseille, and Hamburg. All three teams advanced to the UEFA Cup.

== First round ==
Team 1	Agg.	Team 2	1st leg	2nd leg
Beitar Jerusalem (Israel)	6–4	(North Macedonia) Sileks	4–3	2–1
Bohemians (Republic of Ireland)	2–3	(Belgium) Gent	1–0	1–3
Tiligul Tiraspol (Moldova)	2–9	(Poland) Pogoń Szczecin	0–3	2–6
Valletta (Malta)	2–7	(Serbia and Montenegro) Budućnost Podgorica	0–5	2–2
Narva Trans (Estonia)	1–2	(Belgium) Lokeren	0–2	1–0
Victoria Rosport (Luxembourg)	2–5	(Sweden) Göteborg	1–2	1–3
Dinamo Tirana (Albania)	3–5	(Croatia) Varteks	2–1	1–4
Slaven Belupo (Croatia)	2–0	(Slovenia) Drava Ptuj	1–0	1–0
Lernagorts-Ararat (Armenia)	1–9	(Switzerland) Neuchâtel Xamax	1–3	0–6
CFR Ecomax Cluj (Romania)	7–3	(Lithuania) Vėtra	3–2	4–1
Olympiakos Nicosia (Cyprus)	0–16	(Romania) Gloria Bistrița	0–5	0–11
Skála (Faroe Islands)	0–3	(Finland) Tampere United	0–2	0–1
Vasas (Hungary)	0–2	(Slovakia) ZTS Dubnica	0–0	0–2
Žalgiris (Lithuania)	2–0	(Northern Ireland) Lisburn Distillery	1–0	1–0
Karvan (Azerbaijan)	1–4	(Poland) Lech Poznań	1–2	0–2
Rànger's (Andorra)	1–6	(Austria) Sturm Graz	1–1	0–5
Bangor City (Wales)	1–4	(Latvia) Dinaburg	1–2	0–2
Smederevo (Serbia and Montenegro)	1–3	(North Macedonia) Pobeda	0–1	1–2
Neman Grodno (Belarus)	0–1	(Czech Republic) Tescoma Zlín	0–1	0–0
Lombard-Pápa (Hungary)	3–1	(Georgia (country)) WIT Georgia	2–1	1–0
Inter Turku (Finland)	4–0	(Iceland) ÍA	0–0	4–0

=== First leg ===
18 June 2005

Beitar Jerusalem (Israel)	4–3	(North Macedonia) Sileks
Ben Shushan 17', 48', 80'; Baruchyan 61'		Jovanovski 2'; Ristić 28'; Arsovski 71'

Bloomfield Stadium, Tel Aviv
Attendance: 4,000
Referee: Luc Wilmes (Luxembourg)

18 June 2005

Bohemians (Republic of Ireland)	1–0	(Belgium) Gent
Grant 49'

Dalymount Park, Dublin
Attendance: 3,120
Referee: Sašo Lazarevski (Macedonia)

18 June 2005

Tiligul Tiraspol (Moldova)	0–3	(Poland) Pogoń Szczecin
		Kaźmierczak 45'; Parzy 84'; Michalski 90'

Stadionul Republican, Chișinău
Attendance: 800
Referee: Kuddusi Müftüoğlu (Turkey)

18 June 2005

Valletta (Malta)	0–5	(Serbia and Montenegro) Budućnost Podgorica
		Vujović 8', 30'; Sekulić 16', 70', 76'

Hibernians Ground, Paola
Attendance: 589
Referee: Brian Lawlor (Wales)

18 June 2005

Narva Trans (Estonia)	0–2	(Belgium) Lokeren
		Grétarsson 2'; Vukomanović 78'

A. Le Coq Arena, Tallinn
Attendance: 300
Referee: Emil Laursen (Denmark)

18 June 2005

Victoria Rosport (Luxembourg)	1–2	(Sweden) Göteborg
Görres 70'		M. Berg 59'; J. Berg 80'

Stade Josy Barthel, Luxembourg
Attendance: 1,104
Referee: Ghenadie Orlic (Moldova)

18 June 2005

Dinamo Tirana (Albania)	2–1	(Croatia) Varteks
Mariño 6'; Qorri 15'		Novinić 90'

Qemal Stafa Stadium, Tirana
Attendance: 1,000
Referee: Anthony Zammit (Malta)

18 June 2005

Slaven Belupo (Croatia)	1–0	(Slovenia) Drava Ptuj
Dodik 83'

Gradski stadion, Koprivnica
Attendance: 1,500
Referee: René Rogalla (Switzerland)

18 June 2005

Lernagorts-Ararat (Armenia)	1–3	(Switzerland) Neuchâtel Xamax
Navoyan 27'		Griffiths 2', 32'; Muñoz 90'

Vazgen Sargsyan Republican Stadium, Yerevan
Attendance: 1,300
Referee: Ioannis Tsaheilidis (Greece)

18 June 2005

CFR Ecomax Cluj (Romania)	3–2	(Lithuania) Vėtra
Tilincă 2', 12'; Anca 11' (pen.)		Šernas 9'; A. Steško 85'

Stadionul Dr. Constantin Rădulescu, Cluj-Napoca
Attendance: 4,050
Referee: Christoforos Zografos (Greece)

18 June 2005

Olympiakos Nicosia (Cyprus)	0–5	(Romania) Gloria Bistrița
		Pereș 23', 30', 59'; Chibulcutean 69'; Bucur 89'

Makario Stadium, Nicosia
Attendance: 80
Referee: Novo Panic (Bosnia and Herzegovina)

18 June 2005

Skála (Faroe Islands)	0–2	(Finland) Tampere United
		Hynynen 57', 67'

Svangaskarð, Toftir
Attendance: 400
Referee: Aleh Chykun (Belarus)

18 June 2005

Vasas (Hungary)	0–0	(Slovakia) ZTS Dubnica

Stadion Rudolf Illovszky, Budapest
Attendance: 600
Referee: Siniša Zrnić (Bosnia and Herzegovina)

19 June 2005

Žalgiris (Lithuania)	1–0	(Northern Ireland) Lisburn Distillery
Lemežis 54'

Žalgiris Stadium, Vilnius
Attendance: 1,200
Referee: Jouni Hietala (Finland)

19 June 2005

Karvan (Azerbaijan)	1–2	(Poland) Lech Poznań
Muzika 63'		Gajtkowski 25'; Mowlik 82' (pen.)

Shafa Stadium, Baku
Attendance: 3,500
Referee: Cem Papila (Turkey)

19 June 2005

Rànger's (Andorra)	1–1	(Austria) Sturm Graz
Urbani 35'		Rabihou 70'

Estadi Comunal d'Andorra la Vella, Andorra la Vella
Attendance: 450
Referee: Gabriele Rossi (San Marino)

19 June 2005

Bangor City (Wales)	1–2	(Latvia) Dinaburg
Eltermanis 44' (o.g.)		Sokoļskis 5'; Vaļuškins 67'

Belle Vue, Rhyl
Attendance: 832
Referee: Svein Oddvar Moen (Norway)

19 June 2005

Smederevo (Serbia and Montenegro)	0–1	(North Macedonia) Pobeda
		Ristovski 49'

Smederevo Stadium, Smederevo
Attendance: 3,200
Referee: Tomáš Čuřín (Czech Republic)

19 June 2005

Neman Grodno (Belarus)	0–1	(Czech Republic) Tescoma Zlín
		Lukastík 49'

Torpedo Stadium, Minsk
Attendance: 1,000
Referee: Milan Karadžić (Serbia and Montenegro)

19 June 2005

Lombard-Pápa (Hungary)	2–1	(Georgia (country)) WIT Georgia
T. Szabó 60', 90+2'		Ebanoidze 90'

Perutz Stadion, Pápa
Attendance: 1,113
Referee: José Luis Mengual Prades (Andorra)

19 June 2005

Inter Turku (Finland)	0–0	(Iceland) ÍA

Veritas Stadion, Turku
Attendance: 1,546
Referee: Paulius Malžinskas (Lithuania)

=== Second leg ===
25 June 2015

Sileks (North Macedonia)	1–2	(Israel) Beitar Jerusalem
Ristić 30'		Baruchyan 37'; Ohayon 90'

Gradski Stadion, Skopje
Attendance: 1,125
Referee: Szabolcs Saskőy (Hungary)

Beitar Jerusalem won 6–4 on aggregate.

25 June 2005

Gent (Belgium)	3–1	(Republic of Ireland) Bohemians
Jbari 1'; Håkonsen 11'; Vrancken 60'		Byrne 75'

Jules Ottenstadion, Ghent
Attendance: 2,600
Referee: Khagani Mammadov (Azerbaijan)

Gent won 3–2 on aggregate.

25 June 2005

Pogoń Szczecin (Poland)	6–2	(Moldova) Tiligul Tiraspol
Batata 22', 24'; Milar 27' (pen.); Bugaj 52'; Stroenco 88' (o.g.); Kowal 90'		Cuzneţov 36'; Bacal 70'

Stadion Florian Krygier, Szczecin
Attendance: 2,212
Referee: Alexandru Deaconu (Romania)

Pogoń Szczecin won 9–2 on aggregate.

25 June 2005

Budućnost Podgorica (Serbia and Montenegro)	2–2	(Malta) Valletta
Sekulić 1', 62'		M. Grima 21' (pen.); Agius 80'

Podgorica City Stadium, Podgorica
Attendance: 1,100
Referee: Marek Mikolajewski (Poland)

Budućnost Podgorica won 7–2 on aggregate.

25 June 2005

Lokeren (Belgium)	0–1	(Estonia) Narva Trans
		Tarassenkov 27'

Het Kuipje, Westerlo
Attendance: 422
Referee: Sergey Tsaregradskiyi (Kazakhstan)

Lokeren won 2–1 on aggregate.

25 June 2005

Göteborg (Sweden)	3–1	(Luxembourg) Victoria Rosport
D. Jonsson 1', 80'; M. Berg 89'		Morais 19'

Ullevi, Gothenburg
Attendance: 1,274
Referee: Andriy Shandor (Ukraine)

Göteborg won 5–2 on aggregate.

25 June 2005

Varteks (Croatia)	4–1	(Albania) Dinamo Tirana
Benko 32', 53', 74', 90' (pen.)		Goudiaby 12'

Stadion NK Varteks, Varaždin
Attendance: 1,400
Referee: Asaf Kenan (Israel)

Varteks won 5–3 on aggregate.

25 June 2005

Drava Ptuj (Slovenia)	0–1	(Croatia) Slaven Belupo
		Šaranović 90'

Ljudski vrt, Maribor
Attendance: 550
Referee: David McKeon (Republic of Ireland)

Slaven Belupo won 2–0 on aggregate.

25 June 2005

Neuchâtel Xamax (Switzerland)	6–0	(Armenia) Lernagorts-Ararat
Baumann 14'; Oppliger 17'; Maraninchi 36'; Doudin 39'; Griffiths 64'; Cordonnier 86'

Stade de Genève, Geneva
Attendance: 800
Referee: Hristo Ristoskov (Bulgaria)

Neuchâtel Xamax won 9–1 on aggregate.

26 June 2005

Vėtra (Lithuania)	1–4	(Romania) CFR Ecomax Cluj
Butrimavičius 37'		Dan 3'; Anca 31'; Jula 86' (pen.); Tilincă 90'

Vetros Stadium, Vilnius
Attendance: 1,300
Referee: Pavel Olsiak (Slovakia)

CFR Ecomax Cluj won 7–3 on aggregate.

26 June 2005

Gloria Bistrița (Romania)	11–0	(Cyprus) Olympiakos Nicosia
Bucur 7', 64', 78'; Pereș 12', 19', 33'; Negrean 27', 29', 35'; Székely 76'; Bozeșan 89' (pen.)

Stadionul Gloria, Bistrița
Attendance: 1,000
Referee: Igor Zakharov (Russia)

Gloria Bistrița won 16–0 on aggregate.

26 June 2005

Tampere United (Finland)	1–0	(Faroe Islands) Skála
Räsänen 67'

Ratina Stadium, Tampere
Attendance: 1,803
Referee: Andrejs Sipailo (Latvia)

Tampere United won 3–0 on aggregate.

26 June 2005

ZTS Dubnica (Slovakia)	2–0	(Hungary) Vasas
Kiška 21'; Tesák 49'

Mestský štadión, Dubnica nad Váhom
Attendance: 3,200
Referee: Marijo Strahonja (Croatia)

ZTS Dubnica won 2–0 on aggregate.

25 June 2005

Lisburn Distillery (Northern Ireland)	0–1	(Lithuania) Žalgiris
		Shilo 48'

New Grosvenor Stadium, Ballyskeagh
Attendance: 706
Referee: Lassin Isaksen (Faroe Islands)

Žalgiris won 2–0 on aggregate.

25 June 2005

Lech Poznań (Poland)	2–0	(Azerbaijan) Karvan
Wachowicz 60'; Scherfchen 78'

Stadion Miejski, Poznań
Attendance: 3,000
Referee: Jóhannes Valgeirsson (Iceland)

Lech Poznań won 4–1 on aggregate.

25 June 2005

Sturm Graz (Austria)	5–0	(Andorra) Rànger's
Filipović 26'; Rabihou 33'; Säumel 43'; Šarac 79', 82'

Arnold-Schwarzenegger-Stadion, Graz
Attendance: 3,866
Referee: Adrian McCourt (Northern Ireland)

Sturm Graz won 6–1 on aggregate.

26 June 2005

Dinaburg (Latvia)	2–0	(Wales) Bangor City
Sokoļskis 13'; Atherton 56' (o.g.)

Celtnieks Stadium, Daugavpils
Attendance: 615
Referee: Ararat Tchagharyan (Armenia)

Dinaburg won 4–1 on aggregate.

26 June 2005

Pobeda (North Macedonia)	2–1	(Serbia and Montenegro) Smederevo
Vujović 75'; Kapinkovski 82'		Divić 16'

Gradski Stadion, Skopje
Attendance: 260
Referee: Thomas Einwaller (Austria)

Pobeda won 3–1 on aggregate.

26 June 2005

Tescoma Zlín (Czech Republic)	0–0	(Belarus) Neman Grodno

Letná Stadion, Zlín
Attendance: 1,958
Referee: Merab Malaguradze (Georgia)

Tescoma Zlín won 1–0 on aggregate.

26 June 2005

WIT Georgia (Georgia (country))	0–1	(Hungary) Lombard-Pápa
		Hercegfalvi 50'

Boris Paichadze National Stadium, Tbilisi
Attendance: 2,000
Referee: Robert Krajnc (Slovenia)

Lombard-Pápa won 3–1 on aggregate.

26 June 2005

ÍA (Iceland)	0–4	(Finland) Inter Turku
		Lehtonen 24'; Ilo 65'; Reynisson 75' (o.g.); Petrescu 85'

Akranesvöllur, Akranes
Attendance: 458
Referee: Radek Matejek (Czech Republic)

Inter Turku won 4–0 on aggregate.

== Second round ==
Team 1	Agg.	Team 2	1st leg	2nd leg
Sigma Olomouc (Czech Republic)	1–0	(Poland) Pogoń Szczecin	1–0	0–0
CFR Ecomax Cluj (Romania)	1–1 (5–3 p)	(Spain) Athletic Bilbao	1–0	0–1 (a.e.t.)
Wolfsburg (Germany)	5–3	(Austria) Sturm Graz	2–2	3–1
Deportivo La Coruña (Spain)	4–2	(Serbia and Montenegro) Budućnost Podgorica	3–0	1–2
Ankaraspor (Turkey)	1–4	(Slovakia) ZTS Dubnica	0–4	1–0
Slovan Liberec (Czech Republic)	7–2	(Israel) Beitar Jerusalem	5–1	2–1
Saint-Étienne (France)	3–2	(Switzerland) Neuchâtel Xamax	1–1	2–1
Gent (Belgium)	1–0	(Czech Republic) Tescoma Zlín	1–0	0–0
Hamburg (Germany)	8–2	(North Macedonia) Pobeda	4–1	4–1
Slaven Belupo (Croatia)	4–2	(Romania) Gloria Bistrița	3–2	1–0
Lokeren (Belgium)	2–6	(Switzerland) Young Boys	1–4	1–2
Varteks (Croatia)	6–5	(Finland) Inter Turku	4–3	2–2
Tampere United (Finland)	1–0	(Belgium) Charleroi	1–0	0–0
Lombard-Pápa (Hungary)	2–4	(Sweden) Göteborg	2–3	0–1
Žalgiris (Lithuania)	3–2	(Latvia) Dinaburg	2–0	1–2
Lens (France)	3–1	(Poland) Lech Poznań	2–1	1–0

=== First leg ===
2 July 2005

Sigma Olomouc (Czech Republic)	1–0	(Poland) Pogoń Szczecin
Babnič 35'

Andrův stadion, Olomouc
Attendance: 3,097
Referee: Adrian Caska (Malta)

2 July 2005

CFR Ecomax Cluj (Romania)	1–0	(Spain) Athletic Bilbao
Tilincă 36'

Stadionul Dr. Constantin Rădulescu, Cluj-Napoca
Attendance: 6,120
Referee: Milan Šedivý (Czech Republic)

2 July 2005

Wolfsburg (Germany)	2–2	(Austria) Sturm Graz
Karhan 50'; D'Alessandro 54'		Filipović 51'; Mujiri 80'

Volkswagen Arena, Wolfsburg
Attendance: 8,376
Referee: Alfonso Pérez Burrull (Spain)

2 July 2005

Deportivo La Coruña (Spain)	3–0	(Serbia and Montenegro) Budućnost Podgorica
Xisco 5'; Sergio 81'; Héctor 86'

Estadio Riazor, A Coruña
Attendance: 9,800
Referee: Bruno Derrien (France)

2 July 2005

Ankaraspor (Turkey)	0–4	(Slovakia) ZTS Dubnica
		Držík 15'; Kopačka 29' (pen.); Adam 34'; Ižvolt 90'

Ankara 19 Mayıs Stadium, Ankara
Attendance: 4,639
Referee: Howard Webb (England)

2 July 2005

Slovan Liberec (Czech Republic)	5–1	(Israel) Beitar Jerusalem
Hološko 28'; Zápotočný 48'; Slepička 55', 90'; Došek 83'		Ben Shushan 66'

Stadion u Nisy, Liberec
Attendance: 2,622
Referee: Pavel Saliy (Kazakhstan)

2 July 2005

Saint-Étienne (France)	1–1	(Switzerland) Neuchâtel Xamax
Sablé 71'		Lombardo 57'

Stade Geoffroy-Guichard, Saint-Étienne
Attendance: 32,021
Referee: Richard Havrilla (Slovakia)

2 July 2005

Gent (Belgium)	1–0	(Czech Republic) Tescoma Zlín
Martens 50'

Jules Ottenstadion, Ghent
Attendance: 2,252
Referee: Egill Mar Markusson (Iceland)

2 July 2005

Hamburg (Germany)	4–1	(North Macedonia) Pobeda
Demel 49'; Laas 67'; Takyi 75'; Trochowski 72'		Popovski 45'

AOL Arena, Hamburg
Attendance: 27,612
Referee: Viktor Kassai (Hungary)

2 July 2005

Slaven Belupo (Croatia)	3–2	(Romania) Gloria Bistrița
Vručina 45'; Šaranović 60'; Musa 81' (pen.)		Pereș 31' (pen.); Bucur 70'

Gradski stadion, Koprivnica
Attendance: 1,900
Referee: Johny ver Eecke (Belgium)

2 July 2005

Lokeren (Belgium)	1–4	(Switzerland) Young Boys
Deschacht 70'		Steinsson 4'; Neri 25'; Varela 49'; Häberli 67'

Het Kuipje, Westerlo
Attendance: 545
Referee: Brage Sandmoen (Norway)

2 July 2005

Varteks (Croatia)	4–3	(Finland) Inter Turku
Benko 4', 90'; Halilović 55'; Šafarić 85'		N'Gal 9', 75'; Ilo 14'

Stadion NK Varteks, Varaždin
Attendance: 1,100
Referee: Kostas Theodotou (Cyprus)

3 July 2005

Tampere United (Finland)	1–0	(Belgium) Charleroi
Hynynen 25'

Ratina Stadion, Tampere
Attendance: 3,519
Referee: David Malcolm (Northern Ireland)

3 July 2005

Lombard-Pápa (Hungary)	2–3	(Sweden) Göteborg
T. Szabó 18'; Herczeg 64'		Selaković 66' (pen.); M. Berg 80'; Wendt 90'

Perutz Stadion, Pápa
Attendance: 1,972
Referee: Tsvetan Georgiev (Bulgaria)

3 July 2005

Žalgiris (Lithuania)	2–0	(Latvia) Dinaburg
Jasaitis 70'; Lemežis 75'

Vetros Stadium, Vilnius
Attendance: 1,100
Referee: Valery Vyalichka (Belarus)

3 July 2005

Lens (France)	2–1	(Poland) Lech Poznań
Jussiê 19'; Gillet 44'		Gajtkowski 67'

Stade Félix Bollaert, Lens
Attendance: 23,499
Referee: Charlie Richmond (Scotland)

=== Second leg ===
9 July 2005

Pogoń Szczecin (Poland)	0–0	(Czech Republic) Sigma Olomouc

Stadion Florian Krygier, Szczecin
Attendance: 5,300
Referee: Albano Janku (Albania)

Sigma Olomouc won 1–0 on aggregate.

9 July 2005

Athletic Bilbao (Spain)	1–0 (a.e.t.)	(Romania) CFR Ecomax Cluj
Javi González 37'
Penalties
Ustaritz (penalty missed); Gontzal (penalty scored); Ibón (penalty scored); Guerrero (penalty scored)	3–5	(penalty scored) Jula; (penalty scored) Vlajić; (penalty scored) Toma; (penalty scored) Anca; (penalty scored) Coroian

San Mamés Stadium, Bilbao
Attendance: 14,000
Referee: Paulo Paraty (Portugal)

1–1 on aggregate, CFR Ecomax Cluj won in a penalty shootout.

9 July 2005

Sturm Graz (Austria)	1–3	(Germany) Wolfsburg
Neukirchner 68'		Petrov 12' (pen.), 77'; Menseguez 90'

Arnold Schwarzenegger Stadion, Graz
Attendance: 6,712
Referee: Petteri Kari (Finland)

Wolfsburg won 5–3 on aggregate.

9 July 2005

Budućnost Podgorica (Serbia and Montenegro)	2–1	(Spain) Deportivo La Coruña
Sekulić 65'; Vujović 87'		Acuña 90+' (pen.)

Podgorica City Stadium, Podgorica
Attendance: 5,004
Referee: Ferenc Bede (Hungary)

Deportivo La Coruña won 4–2 on aggregate.

9 July 2005

ZTS Dubnica (Slovakia)	0–1	(Turkey) Ankaraspor
		Jabá 74'

Mestský štadión, Dubnica nad Váhom
Attendance: 3,230
Referee: Draženko Kovačić (Croatia)

ZTS Dubnica won 4–1 on aggregate.

10 July 2005

Beitar Jerusalem (Israel)	1–2	(Czech Republic) Slovan Liberec
Ben Shushan 59'		Dort 52'; Holenda 87'

Bloomfield Stadium, Tel Aviv
Attendance: 700
Referee: Dietmar Drabek (Austria)

Slovan Liberec won 7–2 on aggregate.

10 July 2005

Neuchâtel Xamax (Switzerland)	1–2	(France) Saint-Étienne
Maraninchi 80'		Mazure 60'; Feindouno 70'

Stade de Genève, Geneva
Attendance: 11,273
Referee: Marian Mircea Salomir (Romania)

Saint-Étienne won 3–2 on aggregate.

10 July 2005

Tescoma Zlín (Czech Republic)	0–0	(Belgium) Gent

Letná Stadion, Zlín
Attendance: 3,054
Referee: Kostadin Kostadinov (Bulgaria)

Gent won 1–0 on aggregate.

10 July 2005

Pobeda (North Macedonia)	1–4	(Germany) Hamburg
Ristovski 31'		Mpenza 38'; Beinlich 65'; Karl 79'; Lauth 90'

Gradski Stadion, Skopje
Attendance: 3,000
Referee: Cristian Balaj (Romania)

Hamburg won 8–2 on aggregate.

10 July 2005

Gloria Bistrița (Romania)	0–1	(Croatia) Slaven Belupo
		Musa 65' (pen.)

Stadionul Gloria, Bistrița
Attendance: 1,500
Referee: Meir Levi (Israel)

Slaven Belupo won 4–2 on aggregate.

10 July 2005

Young Boys (Switzerland)	2–1	(Belgium) Lokeren
Steinsson 79'; Sermeter 81' (pen.)		Grétarsson 62' (pen.)

Stadion Neufeld, Bern
Attendance: 3,800
Referee: Ian Stokes (Republic of Ireland)

Young Boys won 6–2 on aggregate.

10 July 2005

Inter Turku (Finland)	2–2	(Croatia) Varteks
N'Gal 17', 58'		Jolić 27'; Mohorović 90'

Veritas Stadion, Turku
Attendance: 2,086
Referee: Drago Kos (Slovenia)

Varteks won 6–5 on aggregate.

9 July 2005

Charleroi (Belgium)	0–0	(Finland) Tampere United

Stade du Pays de Charleroi, Charleroi
Attendance: 7,785
Referee: Stefan Johannesson (Sweden)

Tampere United won 1–0 on aggregate.

9 July 2005

Göteborg (Sweden)	1–0	(Hungary) Lombard-Pápa
M. Berg 90'

Nya Ullevi, Gothenburg
Attendance: 1,556
Referee: Sten Kaldma (Estonia)

Göteborg won 4–2 on aggregate.

9 July 2005

Dinaburg (Latvia)	2–1	(Lithuania) Žalgiris
Čugunovs 16'; Ziziļevs 18'		Jasaitis 47' (pen.)

Celtnieks Stadium, Daugavpils
Attendance: 650
Referee: Dejan Stanišić (Serbia and Montenegro)

Žalgiris won 3–2 on aggregate.

10 July 2005

Lech Poznań (Poland)	0–1	(France) Lens
		Jussiê 11'

Stadion Miejski, Poznań
Attendance: 9,360
Referee: Michael Svendsen (Denmark)

Lens won 3–1 on aggregate.

== Third round ==
Team 1	Agg.	Team 2	1st leg	2nd leg
Deportivo La Coruña (Spain)	4–0	(Croatia) Slaven Belupo	1–0	3–0
Egaleo (Greece)	4–5	(Lithuania) Žalgiris	1–3	3–2
Borussia Dortmund (Germany)	1–1 (a)	(Czech Republic) Sigma Olomouc	1–1	0–0
Young Boys (Switzerland)	3–5	(France) Marseille	2–3	1–2
Varteks (Croatia)	2–5	(France) Lens	1–1	1–4
Roda (Netherlands)	1–1 (a)	(Czech Republic) Slovan Liberec	0–0	1–1
União de Leiria (Portugal)	0–3	(Germany) Hamburg	0–1	0–2
Gent (Belgium)	0–2	(Spain) Valencia	0–0	0–2
ZTS Dubnica (Slovakia)	1–5	(England) Newcastle United	1–3	0–2
Lazio (Italy)	4–1	(Finland) Tampere United	3–0	1–1
Göteborg (Sweden)	0–4	(Germany) Wolfsburg	0–2	0–2
CFR Ecomax Cluj (Romania)	3–3 (a)	(France) Saint-Étienne	1–1	2–2

=== First leg ===
16 July 2005

Deportivo La Coruña (Spain)	1–0	(Croatia) Slaven Belupo
Castro 73'

Estadio Riazor, A Coruña
Attendance: 13,344
Referee: Bülent Demirlek (Turkey)

16 July 2005

Egaleo (Greece)	1–3	(Lithuania) Žalgiris
Saganas 85'		Lemežis 16'; Morinas 60'; Jašurek 67'

Yiannis Pathiakakis Stadium, Ano Liosia
Attendance: 247
Referee: Miroslaw Ryszka (Poland)

16 July 2005

Borussia Dortmund (Germany)	1–1	(Czech Republic) Sigma Olomouc
Kringe 8'		Koller 44' (o.g.)

Westfalenstadion, Dortmund
Attendance: 43,000
Referee: Kevin Blom (Netherlands)

16 July 2005

Young Boys (Switzerland)	2–3	(France) Marseille
Raimondi 61'; Yakin 74'		Oruma 15'; Niang 35'; Taiwo 82'

Stade de Suisse, Bern
Attendance: 14,000
Referee: Craig Thomson (Scotland)

16 July 2005

Varteks (Croatia)	1–1	(France) Lens
Plantić 90'		Cousin 60'

Stadion NK Varteks, Varaždin
Attendance: 4,200
Referee: Claudio Circhetta (Switzerland)

16 July 2005

Roda (Netherlands)	0–0	(Czech Republic) Slovan Liberec

Parkstad Limburg Stadion, Kerkrade
Attendance: 3,280
Referee: Bruno Paixão (Portugal)

16 July 2005

União de Leiria (Portugal)	0–1	(Germany) Hamburg
		Trochowski 57'

Estádio Dr. Magalhães Pessoa, Leiria
Attendance: 1,350
Referee: Grzegorz Gilewski (Poland)

17 July 2005

Gent (Belgium)	0–0	(Spain) Valencia

Jules Ottenstadion, Ghent
Attendance: 8,430
Referee: Paolo Dondarini (Italy)

17 July 2005

ZTS Dubnica (Slovakia)	1–3	(England) Newcastle United
Tesák 42'		Chopra 4'; N'Zogbia 6'; Milner 70'

Mestský štadión, Dubnica nad Váhom
Attendance: 6,200
Referee: Alon Yefet (Israel)

17 July 2005

Lazio (Italy)	3–0	(Finland) Tampere United
Belleri 28'; Rocchi 29'; Di Canio 48'

Stadio Olimpico, Rome
Attendance: 3,150
Referee: Hervé Piccirillo (France)

17 July 2005

Göteborg (Sweden)	0–2	(Germany) Wolfsburg
		D'Alessandro 33'; Franz 51'

Ullevi, Gothenburg
Attendance: 3,711
Referee: Darko Čeferin (Slovenia)

17 July 2005

CFR Ecomax Cluj (Romania)	1–1	(France) Saint-Étienne
Tilincă 3'		Piquionne 27'

Stadionul Dr. Constantin Rădulescu, Cluj-Napoca
Attendance: 3,200
Referee: Peter Vervecken (Belgium)

=== Second leg ===
23 July 2005

Slaven Belupo (Croatia)	0–3	(Spain) Deportivo La Coruña
		Castro 18'; Víctor 46' (pen.); Tristán 80'

Gradski stadion, Koprivnica
Attendance: 4,000
Referee: Nicolai Vollquartz (Denmark)

Deportivo La Coruña won 4–0 on aggregate.

23 July 2005

Žalgiris (Lithuania)	2–3	(Greece) Egaleo
Lemežis 3'; Morinas 32'		Saganas 40'; Chloros 46' (pen.), 50' (pen.)

Žalgiris Stadium, Vilnius
Attendance: 1,100
Referee: Vitaliy Godulyan (Ukraine)

Žalgiris won 5–4 on aggregate.

23 July 2005

Sigma Olomouc (Czech Republic)	0–0	(Germany) Borussia Dortmund

Andrův stadion, Olomouc
Attendance: 12,052
Referee: Daniel Stålhammar (Sweden)

1–1 on aggregate, Sigma Olomouc won on away goals rule.

23 July 2005

Marseille (France)	2–1	(Switzerland) Young Boys
Luyindula 70' (pen.); Nasri 83'		Raimondi 43'

Stade Vélodrome, Marseille
Attendance: 18,708
Referee: Ivan Bebek (Croatia)

Marseille won 5–3 on aggregate.

23 July 2005

Lens (France)	4–1	(Croatia) Varteks
Lachor 47'; Lacourt 58'; Thomert 66'; Cousin 90'		Vukman 71'

Stade Félix Bollaert, Lens
Attendance: 25,457
Referee: Bernardino González Vázquez (Spain)

Lens won 5–2 on aggregate.

23 July 2005

Slovan Liberec (Czech Republic)	1–1	(Netherlands) Roda
Došek 80'		Sérgio 38'

Stadion u Nisy, Liberec
Attendance: 5,050
Referee: Franz-Xaver Wack (Germany)

1–1 on aggregate, Roda won on away goals rule.

23 July 2005

Hamburg (Germany)	2–0	(Portugal) União de Leiria
Barbarez 50' (pen.); Lauth 76'

AOL Arena, Hamburg
Attendance: 25,164
Referee: Athanassios Briakos (Greece)

Hamburg won 3–0 on aggregate.

23 July 2005

Valencia (Spain)	2–0	(Belgium) Gent
Villa 6'; Kluivert 80'

Mestalla Stadium, Valencia
Attendance: 22,100
Referee: Ruud Bossen (Netherlands)

Valencia won 2–0 on aggregate.

23 July 2005

Newcastle United (England)	2–0	(Slovakia) ZTS Dubnica
Shearer 70', 90'

St James' Park, Newcastle upon Tyne
Attendance: 25,135
Referee: Knut Kircher (Germany)

Newcastle United won 5–1 on aggregate.

23 July 2005

Tampere United (Finland)	1–1	(Italy) Lazio
Wiss 88'		Muzzi 90'

Ratina Stadion, Tampere
Attendance: 3,151
Referee: Rob Styles (England)

Lazio won 4–1 on aggregate.

23 July 2005

Wolfsburg (Germany)	2–0	(Sweden) Göteborg
D'Alessandro 24'; Klimowicz 76'

Volkswagen Arena, Wolfsburg
Attendance: 6,510
Referee: Igor Egorov (Russia)

Wolfsburg won 4–0 on aggregate.

24 July 2005

Saint-Étienne (France)	2–2	(Romania) CFR Ecomax Cluj
Sablé 50'; Dabo 88'		Coroian 23' (pen.); Tilincă 65'

Stade Geoffroy-Guichard, Saint-Étienne
Attendance: 29,516
Referee: Pasquale Rodomonti (Italy)

3–3 on aggregate, CFR Ecomax Cluj won on away goals rule.

== Semi-finals ==
Team 1	Agg.	Team 2	1st leg	2nd leg
Valencia (Spain)	4–0	(Netherlands) Roda	4–0	0–0
Žalgiris (Lithuania)	2–7	(Romania) CFR Ecomax Cluj	1–2	1–5
Sigma Olomouc (Czech Republic)	0–4	(Germany) Hamburg	0–1	0–3
Deportivo La Coruña (Spain)	4–2	(England) Newcastle United	2–1	2–1
Wolfsburg (Germany)	0–4	(France) Lens	0–0	0–4
Lazio (Italy)	1–4	(France) Marseille	1–1	0–3

=== First leg ===
27 July 2005
17:30

Žalgiris (Lithuania)	1–2	(Romania) CFR Ecomax Cluj
Osipovich 74'	Report	Dan 38'; Anca 78'

Žalgiris Stadium, Vilnius
Attendance: 1,500
Referee: Ruud Bossen (Netherlands)

27 July 2005
19:00

Wolfsburg (Germany)	0–0	(France) Lens
	Report

Volkswagen Arena, Wolfsburg
Attendance: 10,511
Referee: Emil Božinovski (Macedonia)

27 July 2005
20:15

Sigma Olomouc (Czech Republic)	0–1	(Germany) Hamburg
	Report	van der Vaart 49'

Andrův stadion, Olomouc
Attendance: 11,435
Referee: Paolo Bertini (Italy)

27 July 2005
21:00

Deportivo La Coruña (Spain)	2–1	(England) Newcastle United
Castro 11'; Andrade 57'	Report	Bowyer 47'

Estadio Riazor, A Coruña
Attendance: 12,396
Referee: Serge Gumienny (Belgium)

27 July 2005
21:00

Lazio (Italy)	1–1	(France) Marseille
Di Canio 42'	Report	Méïté 70'

Stadio Olimpico, Rome
Attendance: 19,698
Referee: Carlos Megía Dávila (Spain)

27 July 2005
22:00

Valencia (Spain)	4–0	(Netherlands) Roda
Rufete 36', 41', 50'; Moretti 83'	Report

Mestalla Stadium, Valencia
Attendance: 24,800
Referee: Markus Nobs (Switzerland)

=== Second leg ===
3 August 2005
16:00

CFR Ecomax Cluj (Romania)	5–1	(Lithuania) Žalgiris
Tilincă 11'; Jula 45' (pen.); Coroian 49'; Minteuan 57'; Anca 72'	Report	Jokšas 80'

Stadionul Dr. Constantin Rădulescu, Cluj-Napoca
Attendance: 5,800
Referee: Bernhard Brugger (Austria)

CFR Ecomax Cluj won 7–2 on aggregate.

3 August 2005
19:00

Lens (France)	4–0	(Germany) Wolfsburg
Dindane 43'; Keita 48'; Jemâa 88', 90'	Report

Stade Félix Bollaert, Lens
Attendance: 25,041
Referee: Mark Halsey (England)

Lens won 4–0 on aggregate.

3 August 2005
20:00

Roda (Netherlands)	0–0	(Spain) Valencia
	Report

Parkstad Limburg Stadion, Kerkrade
Attendance: 3,300
Referee: Espen Berntsen (Norway)

Valencia won 4–0 on aggregate.

3 August 2005
20:15

Hamburg (Germany)	3–0	(Czech Republic) Sigma Olomouc
Lauth 30', 82' van der Vaart 56'	Report

AOL Arena, Hamburg
Attendance: 31,358
Referee: Costas Kapitanis (Cyprus)

Hamburg won 4–0 on aggregate.

3 August 2005
20:45

Newcastle United (England)	1–2	(Spain) Deportivo La Coruña
Milner 39'	Report	Andrade 45'; Munitis 47'

St James' Park, Newcastle upon Tyne
Attendance: 34,215
Referee: Helmut Fleischer (Germany)

Deportivo La Coruña won 4–2 on aggregate.

3 August 2005
21:00

Marseille (France)	3–0	(Italy) Lazio
Niang 60'; Mendoza 61'; Ribéry 65'	Report

Stade Vélodrome, Marseille
Attendance: 40,987
Referee: António Costa (Portugal)

Marseille won 4–1 on aggregate.

== Finals ==
Team 1	Agg.	Team 2	1st leg	2nd leg
CFR Ecomax Cluj (Romania)	2–4	(France) Lens	1–1	1–3
Deportivo La Coruña (Spain)	3–5	(France) Marseille	2–0	1–5
Hamburg (Germany)	1–0	(Spain) Valencia	1–0	0–0

=== First leg ===
9 August 2005
17:00

CFR Ecomax Cluj (Romania)	1–1	(France) Lens
Turcu 57'	Report	Lachor 24'

Stadionul Dr. Constantin Rădulescu, Cluj-Napoca
Attendance: 6,700
Referee: Grzegorz Gilewski (Poland)

9 August 2005
20:15

Hamburg (Germany)	1–0	(Spain) Valencia
Barbarez 50'	Report

AOL Arena, Hamburg
Attendance: 55,386
Referee: Stuart Dougal (Scotland)

9 August 2005
21:00

Deportivo La Coruña (Spain)	2–0	(France) Marseille
Rubén 68'; Iván Carril 87'	Report

Estadio Riazor, A Coruña
Attendance: 15,670
Referee: Jaroslav Jara (Czech Republic)

=== Second leg ===
23 August 2005
20:00

Lens (France)	3–1	(Romania) CFR Ecomax Cluj
Hilton 38'; Coulibaly 76'; Cousin 78' (pen.)	Report	Munteanu 89'

Stade Félix-Bollaert, Lens
Attendance: 37,934
Referee: Alon Yefet (Israel)

Lens won 4–2 on aggregate.

23 August 2005
21:00

Marseille (France)	5–1	(Spain) Deportivo La Coruña
Ribéry 5'; Méïté 65'; Niang 74', 88'; Oruma 90+3'	Report	Andrade 9'

Stade Vélodrome, Marseille
Attendance: 34,605
Referee: Nikolai Ivanov (Russia)

Marseille won 5–3 on aggregate.

23 August 2005
22:00

Valencia (Spain)	0–0	(Germany) Hamburg
	Report

Mestalla Stadium, Valencia
Attendance: 36,250
Referee: Laurent Duhamel (France)

Hamburg won 1–0 on aggregate.

== See also ==
- 2005–06 UEFA Champions League
- 2005–06 UEFA Cup
