= 2005–06 in Romanian football =

The 2005–06 Romanian first division was a very tight season. Steaua, Rapid and Dinamo were very close in the table, and teams like CFR Cluj and FCU Politehnica Timişoara were competitive in their bids for a position to qualify for the European Cups.

The Romania national team did not go to the 2006 FIFA World Cup.

== Divizia A ==
Pos	Team	Pld	W	D	L	GF	GA	GD	Pts	Qualification or relegation
1	Steaua București (C)	30	19	7	4	49	16	+33	64	Qualification to Champions League second qualifying round
2	Rapid București	30	17	8	5	47	23	+24	59	Qualification to UEFA Cup first qualifying round
3	Dinamo București	30	17	5	8	56	32	+24	56 (Note: DIN 4-5 SPO; SPO 0-2 DIN)	Qualification to UEFA Cup first qualifying round
4	Sportul Studențesc București (R)	30	17	5	8	54	35	+19	55	Relegation to Liga II (Note: Sportul Studențesc was denied the right to participate for next season of Liga I because it failed to meet the licensing requirements, therefore Pandurii Lignitul Târgu Jiu (15th place) was spared from relegation.)
5	CFR Cluj	30	14	8	8	36	27	+9	50	
6	Național București	30	13	7	10	32	37	−5	46	
7	Farul Constanța	30	14	3	13	39	38	+1	45	Qualification to Intertoto Cup first round
8	Politehnica Timișoara	30	10	10	10	34	31	+3	40	
9	Oțelul Galați	30	10	9	11	35	37	−2	39 (Note: OȚE: 8 pts; GLO: 5 pts; POL: 2 pts)	
10	Gloria Bistrița	30	11	6	13	27	34	−7	39	
11	Politehnica Iași	30	11	6	13	28	31	−3	39	
12	Argeș Pitești	30	8	8	14	27	37	−10	32	
13	Jiul Petroșani	30	7	9	14	28	39	−11	30	
14	Vaslui	30	6	11	13	23	37	−14	29	
15	Pandurii Târgu Jiu	30	6	7	17	22	44	−22	25	Spared from relegation
16	Bacău (R)	30	3	5	22	16	55	−39	14	Relegation to Liga II

Source: LPF (in Romanian)
Rules for classification: 1) points; 2) head-to-head points; 3) head-to-head goal difference; 4) head-to-head goals scored; 5) goal difference; 6) number of goals scored.
(C) Champions; (R) Relegated

== European Cups ==
=== UEFA Champions League ===
==== Steaua București ====
This section will cover Steaua's games from July 27, 2005 until the start of August 23, 2005.

Date	Venue	Opponents	Score	Comp	Steaua scorers	Match Report(s)
July 27, 2005	Tolka Park; Dublin, Ireland	Shelbourne Football Club	0–0	UCL	N/A	Romanian Soccer
August 3, 2005	Ghencea Stadium; Bucharest, Romania	Shelbourne Football Club	4–1	UCL	Nicoliţă 18', Iacob 28', Diniţă 61', Opriţa pen 95'	Romanian Soccer
August 10, 2005	Ghencea Stadium; Bucharest, Romania	Rosenborg Ballklub	1–1	UCL	Iacob 30'	Romanian Soccer
August 23, 2005	Lerkendal Stadion; Trondheim, Norway	Rosenborg Ballklub	3–2	UCL	Rădoi 74' Iacob 76'	Romanian Soccer

=== UEFA Cup ===
==== Steaua București ====
This section will cover Steaua's games from September 23, 2005 until today.

Date	Venue	Opponents	Score	Comp	Steaua scorers	Match Report(s)
September 15, 2005	Ullevaal Stadion; Oslo, Norway	Vålerengens Idrettsforening	0–3	UCUP	Rădoi 24', Iacob 35', Goian 73'	Romanian Soccer
September 29, 2005	Gheorghe Hagi; Constanţa, Romania	Vålerengens Idrettsforening	3–1	UCUP	Dică 31', Boştină 41', Iacob 48'	Romanian Soccer
October 20, 2005	Ghencea Stadium; Bucharest, Romania	Racing Club de Lens	4–0	UCUP	Iacob 13', Goian 16', Dică (45' 63')	Romanian Soccer
November 3, 2005	Stadio Luigi Ferraris; Genoa, Italy	Unione Calcio Sampdoria	0–0	UCUP	N/A	Romanian Soccer
November 30, 2005	Ghencea Stadium; Bucharest, Romania	Halmstads Ball Klub	3–0	UCUP	Rădoi 9', Goian 64', Iacob (72')	Romanian Soccer
December 15, 2005	Olympiastadion; Berlin, Germany	Hertha Berliner Sport Club	0–0	UCUP	N/A	Romanian Soccer
February 15, 2006	Abe Lenstra; Heerenveen, Netherlands	Sport Club Heerenveen	1–3	UCUP	Dică 28', Goian 77', Paraschiv 80'	Romanian Soccer
February 23, 2006	Naţional; Bucharest, Romania	Sport Club Heerenveen	0–1	UCUP	N/A	Romanian Soccer
March 9, 2006	Naţional; Bucharest, Romania	Real Betis Balompié	0–0	UCUP	N/A	Romanian Soccer
March 16, 2006	Manuel Ruiz de Lopera; Seville, Spain	Real Betis Balompié	0–3	UCUP	Nicoliţă (54', 81'), Iacob 77'	Romanian Soccer
March 30, 2006	Giuleşti Stadium; Bucharest, Romania	Fotbal Club Rapid București	1–1	UCUP	Nicoliţă 4'	Romanian Soccer
April 6, 2006	Naţional; Bucharest, Romania	Fotbal Club Rapid București	0–0	UCUP	N/A	Romanian Soccer
April 20, 2006	Naţional; Bucharest, Romania	Middlesbrough Football Club	1–0	UCUP	Dică 30'	Romanian Soccer
April 27, 2006	Riverside Stadium; Middlesbrough, England	Middlesbrough Football Club	4–2	UCUP	Dică 15', Goian 23'	Romanian Soccer

Team	Victories	Draws	Defeats	Goal difference
Steaua București	8	7	3	30–13

==== Rapid București ====
This section will cover Rapid's games from July 14, 2005 until today.

Date	Venue	Opponents	Score	Comp	Rapid scorers	Match Report(s)
July 14, 2005	Estadi Communal; La Vella, Andorra	Unió Esportiva Santa Juliá	0–5	UCUP	Niculae (10', 34', 64'), Blazquez 60' (OG), Vasilache 73'	Romanian Soccer
July 28, 2005	Giuleşti Stadium; Bucharest, Romania	Unió Esportiva Santa Juliá	5–0	UCUP	Buga (01', 17', 21', 30'), Măldărăşanu 79'	Romanian Soccer
August 11, 2005	Giuleşti Stadium; Bucharest, Romania	Futbalski Klub Vardar Skopje	3–0	UCUP	Niculae (44', 50'), Măldărăşanu 67'	Romanian Soccer
August 25, 2005	Gradski; Skopje, Macedonia	Futbalski Klub Vardar Skopje	1–1	UCUP	Vasilache 58'	Romanian Soccer
September 15, 2005	De Kuip; Rotterdam, Netherlands	Feyenoord Rotterdam	1–1	UCUP	Vasilache 76'	Romanian Soccer
September 29, 2005	Giuleşti Stadium; Bucharest, Romania	Feyenoord Rotterdam	1–0	UCUP	Buga 13'	Romanian Soccer
November 3, 2005	Giuleşti Stadium; Bucharest, Romania	Stade Rennais Football Club	2–0	UCUP	Niculae 41', Buga 69'	Romanian Soccer
November 24, 2005	RSC Olimpiyskiy; Donetsk, Ukraine	Futbaliski Klub Shakhtar Donetsk	0–1	UCUP	Măldărăşanu 87'	Romanian Soccer
December 1, 2005	Giuleşti Stadium; Bucharest, Romania	PAOK Thessaloniki	1–0	UCUP	Măldărăşanu 45'	Romanian Soccer
December 14, 2005	Gottlieb-Daimler; Stuttgart, Germany	Verein für Bewegungsspiele Stuttgart	2–1	UCUP	Burdujan 80'	Romanian Soccer
February 15, 2006	Olympiastadion; Berlin, Germany	Hertha Berliner Sport Club	0–1	UCUP	Negru 68' pen	Romanian Soccer
February 23, 2006	Giuleşti Stadium; Bucharest, Romania	Hertha Berliner Sport Club	2–0	UCUP	Niculae 53', Buga 73'	Romanian Soccer
March 9, 2006	Giuleşti Stadium; Bucharest, Romania	Hamburger Sport-Verein	2–0	UCUP	Niculae 46', Buga 88'	Romanian Soccer
March 15, 2006	AOL Arena; Hamburg, Germany	Hamburger Sport-Verein	3–1	UCUP	Buga 52'	Romanian Soccer
March 30, 2006	Giuleşti Stadium; Bucharest, Romania	Fotbal Club Steaua București	1–1	UCUP	V. Moldovan 49'	Romanian Soccer
April 6, 2006	Naţional; Bucharest, Romania	Fotbal Club Steaua București	0–0	UCUP	N/A	Romanian Soccer

Team	Victories	Draws	Defeats	Goal difference
Rapid București	10	3	2	28–8

==== Dinamo București ====
This section will cover Dinamo's games from August 11, 2005 until December 14, 2005.

Date	Venue	Opponents	Score	Comp	Steaua scorers	Match Report(s)
August 14, 2005	Dinamo; Bucharest, Romania	Omonia Nicosia Football Club	3–1	UCUP	V.Munteanu pen 10', Zicu (25', 43')	Romanian Soccer
August 25, 2005	Neo GSP Stadium; Nicosia, Cyprus	Omonia Nicosia Football Club	2–1	UCUP	Niculescu 55'	Romanian Soccer
September 15, 2005	Dinamo; Bucharest, Romania	Everton Football Club Liverpool	5–1	UCUP	Niculescu 27', Zicu 52', Petre 70', Bratu (75', 92')	Romanian Soccer
September 29, 2005	Goodison Park; Liverpool, England	Everton Football Club Liverpool	1–0	UCUP	N/A	Romanian Soccer
October 20, 2005	Dinamo; Bucharest, Romania	Sport Club Heerenveen	0–0	UCUP	N/A	Romanian Soccer
November 3, 2005	Georgi Asparuhov; Sofia, Bulgaria	Professional Football Club Levski Sofia	1–0	UCUP	N/A	Romanian Soccer
December 1, 2005	Dinamo; Bucharest, Romania	Central Sports Club of Army Moscow	1–0	UCUP	V.Munteanu 71'	Romanian Soccer
December 14, 2005	Vélodrome; Marseille, France	Olympique de Marseille	2–1	UCUP	Niculescu 51'	Romanian Soccer

Team	Victories	Draws	Defeats	Goal difference
Dinamo București	3	1	4	12–8

=== UEFA Intertoto Cup ===
==== CFR Ecomax Cluj ====
This section will cover CFR Cluj's games from June 18, 2005 until August 23, 2005.

Date	Venue	Opponents	Score	Comp	CFR Cluj scorers	Match Report(s)
June 18, 2005	CFR; Cluj-Napoca, Romania	Futbolo Klubas Vėtra Vilnius	3–2	UICUP	Tilincă (2', 12'), Ad.Anca 11'	Romanian Soccer
June 26, 2005	Vetros; Vilnius, Lithuania	Futbolo Klubas Vėtra Vilnius	1–4	UICUP	Fl.Dan 3', Ad.Anca 31', Jula 86', Tilincă 93'	Romanian Soccer
July 2, 2005	CFR; Cluj-Napoca, Romania	Athletic Bilbao	1–0	UICUP	Tilincă 36'	Romanian Soccer
July 9, 2005	San Mamés; Bilbao, Spain	Athletic Bilbao	1–0	UICUP	N/A	Romanian Soccer
July 16, 2005	CFR; Cluj-Napoca, Romania	Association Sportive de Saint-Étienne	1–1	UICUP	Tilincă 8'	Romanian Soccer
July 24, 2005	Geoffroy-Guichard; Saint Étienne, France	Association Sportive de Saint-Étienne	2–2	UICUP	Coroian 24' pen, Tilincă 8'	Romanian Soccer
July 27, 2005	Žalgiris; Vilnius, Lithuania	Futbolo Klubas Žalgiris	1–2	UICUP	Fl.Dan 37', Ad.Anca 73'	Romanian Soccer
August 3, 2005	CFR; Cluj-Napoca, Romania	Futbolo Klubas Žalgiris	5–1	UICUP	Tilincă 11', Jula 44' pen, Coroian 51', Minteuan 57', Ad.Anca 72'	Romanian Soccer
August 9, 2005	CFR; Cluj-Napoca, Romania	Racing Club de Lens	1–1	UICUP	Turcu 57'	Romanian Soccer
August 23, 2005	Félix Bollaert; Lens, France	Racing Club de Lens	3–1	UICUP	Munteanu 89'	Romanian Soccer

Team	Victories	Draws	Defeats	Goal difference
CFR Ecomax Cluj	5	3	2	20–13

==== Gloria Bistriţa ====
This section will cover Gloria's games from June 18, 2005 until July 10, 2005.

Date	Venue	Opponents	Score	Comp	Gloria scorers	Match Report(s)
June 18, 2005	GSP; Nicosia, Cyprus	Olympiakos Nicosia	0–5	UICUP	Pereş (23', 30', 59'), Chibulcutean 69', Bucur 89'	Romanian Soccer
June 26, 2005	Gloria; Bistriţa, Romania	Olympiakos Nicosia	11–0	UICUP	Bucur (7', 64', 78'), Pereş (13', 19', 33'), Negrean (27', 29', 35'), Szekely 76', Bozeşan 89' pen	Romanian Soccer
July 2, 2005	Gradski; Koprivnica, Croatia	Nogometni Klub Slaven Belupo	3–2	UICUP	Pereş 31' pen, Bucur 70'	Romanian Soccer
July 10, 2005	Gloria; Bistriţa, Romania	Nogometni Klub Slaven Belupo	0–1	UICUP	N/A	Romanian Soccer

Team	Victories	Draws	Defeats	Goal difference
Gloria Bistriţa	2	0	2	18–4

== Romania national team ==
This section will cover Romania's games from July 1, 2005 until the start of 2008 European Championship (qualifying).

Date	Venue	Opponents	Score	Comp	Romania scorers	Match Report(s)
August 17, 2005	Gheorghe Hagi; Constanţa, Romania	Andorra	2–0	WCQ06	Mutu (29', 41')	Official Site
September 3, 2005	Gheorghe Hagi; Constanţa, Romania	Czech Republic	2–0	WCQ06	Mutu (27', 58')	Official Site
October 9, 2005	Olympiastadion; Helsinki, Finland	Finland	0–1	WCQ06	Mutu 41'P	Official Site
November 12, 2005	Léon Bollée; Le Mans, France	Ivory Coast	1–2	F	Iencsi 52'	N/A
November 16, 2005	Ghencea; Bucharest, Romania	Nigeria	3–0	F	Niculae 7', Petre 49', Roşu 89'	N/A
February 28, 2006	Neo GSP; Nicosia, Cyprus	Armenia	2–0	F	Maftei 72', Cociş 87'	N/A
March 1, 2006	Neo GSZ; Larnaka, Cyprus	Slovenia	2–0	F	Mazilu 22', Pecnik OG 53'	N/A
23 May 2006	LA Memorial Coliseum; Los Angeles, United States	Uruguay	0–2	F	N/A	N/A
26 May 2006	Soldier Field; Chicago, United States	Northern Ireland	2–0	F	Buga 6', Niculae 10'	N/A
27 May 2006	Soldier Field; Chicago, United States	Colombia	0–0	F	N/A	N/A
