= Brunčević (surname) =

Brunčević is a surname. Notable people include:

- Ensar Brunčević (born 1999), Serbian footballer
- Mirsad Brunčević (born 1994), Serbian footballer
- Sead Brunčević (born 1977), Serbian footballer
