= Jasaitis =

- Lithuanian surname
- m.: Jasaitis
- f.: (unmarried): Jasaitytė
- f.: (married): Jasaitienė

Jasaitis is a Lithuanian language family name. It may refer to:

- Simas Jasaitis, Lithuanian professional basketball player
- Karolis Jasaitis, Lithuanian football player
- Jurgis Jasaitis, Lithuanian "knygnešys" or book smuggler and rebel against Tsarist rule
