= CFR Cluj in European football =

Romanian association football club

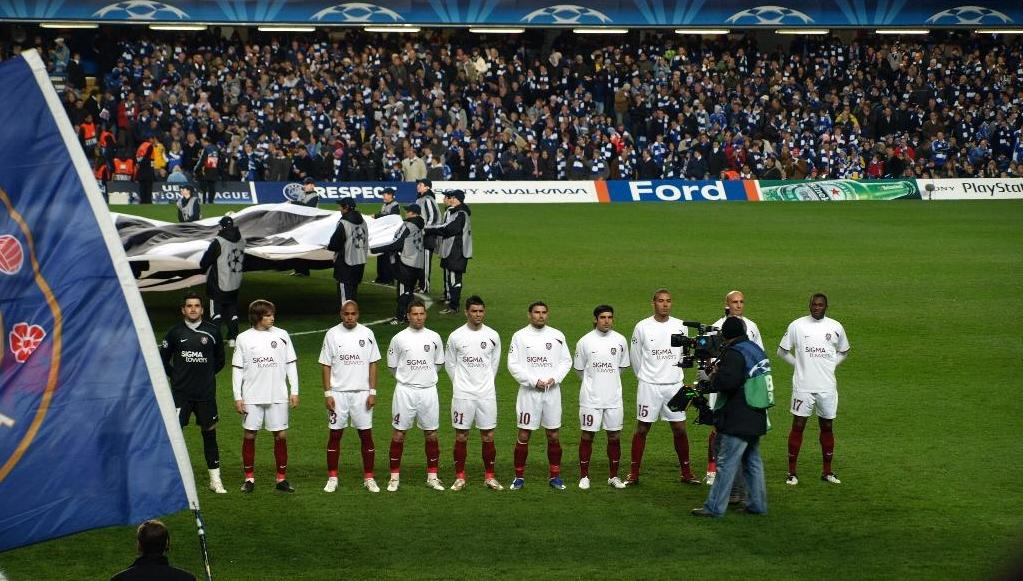
- CFR Cluj on Stamford Bridge in December 2008 in a UEFA Champions League match against Chelsea
- Club: CFR 1907 Cluj
- First entry: 2005 UEFA Intertoto Cup
- Latest entry: 2026–27 UEFA Conference League

Titles
- Champions League: 0 (Best result: Group stage, 3rd place)
- Europa League: 0 (Best result: Round of 32 twice in 2013 and 2020)
- Intertoto Cup: 0 (Best result: Runners-up)

Fotbal Club CFR 1907 Cluj (or CFR Cluj for short) is a Romanian professional football club based in Cluj-Napoca, Cluj County, Transylvania which was initially founded in 1907 as Kolozsvári Vasutas Sport Club (i.e. Railway Sport Club of Cluj originally in Hungarian) during the late period of Austria-Hungary.

The first ever involvement of the club in an official UEFA European competition dates back to 2005, more specifically to that season's UEFA Intertoto Cup in which CFR Cluj (then officially known as CFR Ecomax Cluj) finished as runners-up, losing to French side RC Lens (one of the joint winners alongside Olympique de Marseille and Hamburger SV) 4–2 (aggregate) in the finale.

CFR Cluj holds three European competition records among Romanian football clubs.

== Records established in UEFA competitions amongst Romanian football clubs ==
During the 2012–13 UEFA Champions League season, CFR accumulated 10 points in a Champions League group, with the previous record being held by Unirea Urziceni with 8 points during the 2009–10 season. Moreover, subsequently, in the 2019–20 UEFA Europa League season, CFR accumulated as many as 12 points in the group stage, with the previous record being held by FCSB with 11 points during the 2012–13 season. In addition, the club also managed to qualify for the KPOs of the 2022–23 edition of the UEFA Europa Conference League, after gaining 10 points in Group G, being the only Romanian football club to do so thus far.

== Recent history (2021–present) ==
During the 2021–22 season, CFR Cluj was also the first Romanian football club qualified in the group stage of UEFA Europa Conference League during the first season of the competition's existence, in which they debuted with an away 1–0 loss at Jablonec nad Nisou in the Czech Republic against Czech side FK Jablonec on 16 September 2021 and consequently on the fourth place in the group after the first fixture. The club finished fourth in Group D of the first edition of UEFA Europa Conference League, with only 1 victory, 1 draw, and 4 losses, totalling 4 points.

During the 2022–23 season, CFR Cluj was eliminated from the first qualifying round of the ongoing UEFA Champions League edition by Armenian side Pyunik. This negative performance re-directed them towards the qualifying stages of the current UEFA Europa Conference League season which they had all successfully passed in the meantime, thereby entering the group stage of this UEFA competition consecutively for the second time. The club started their second UEFA Europa Conference League season rather modestly, with only a last minute 1–1 draw against Kosovar side FC Ballkani.

Subsequently, they lost 1–0 to Sivasspor at home and 3–0 away, but they surprisingly went on to win over the group's top favourite (Note: i.e. for winning the group and qualifying first afterwards to the Round of 16 or the Knockout round play-offs (KPO round for short)) Slavia Prague both home and away (3–0 overall). At the end of the 6 fixtures of the group stage, CFR managed to finish second with 10 points and thereby qualify for the knockout round play-offs in February 2023 when they are about to face Italian side Lazio Rome which finished third in their group (i.e. Group F) in the current edition of UEFA Europa League.

During the 2023–24 season, CFR Cluj did not qualify for the group stage of the ongoing edition of the UEFA Europa Conference League, being eliminated by Turkish side Adana Demirspor in the second qualifying round (2–3 overall score).

== Total statistics ==
As of away match played against Tromsø on 13 August 2026.

Competition	S	Pld	W	D	L	GF	GA	GD
UEFA Champions League	8	42	16	10	16	54	54	0
UEFA Cup / UEFA Europa League	9	44	14	9	21	39	54	−15
UEFA Conference League	6	33	12	9	12	32	35	-3
UEFA Intertoto Cup	1	10	5	3	2	20	13	+7
Total	24	129	47	31	51	145	156	−11

== Statistics by country ==
As of 13 August 2026

Country	Pld	W	D	L	GF	GA	GD
Andorra	2	1	1	0	4	1	+3
Armenia	6	3	3	0	13	3	+10
Belarus	6	2	2	2	6	3	+3
Bosnia and Herzegovina	4	2	1	1	7	5	+2
Bulgaria	2	1	1	0	2	0	+2
Croatia	1	0	1	0	2	2	0
Cyprus	4	1	1	2	2	6	–4
Czech Republic	10	5	0	5	8	8	0
Denmark	4	1	1	2	2	2	–1
England	4	1	1	2	3	4	–1
Finland	1	1	0	0	3	1	+2
France	8	2	3	3	8	10	–2
Germany	2	0	0	2	2	7	–5
Gibraltar	2	2	0	0	4	1	+3
Hungary	2	1	1	0	3	0	+3
Italy	12	2	2	8	7	22	–15
Israel	4	3	1	0	5	2	+3
Kazakhstan	2	1	0	1	3	2	+1
Kosovo	2	1	1	0	2	1	+1
Lithuania	4	4	0	0	14	5	+9
Luxembourg	2	0	0	2	2	5	–3
Malta	1	1	0	0	2	0	+2
Netherlands	4	0	0	4	0	6	–6
Norway	2	0	0	2	1	7	–6
Portugal	4	2	0	2	6	5	+1
Scotland	4	2	1	1	7	6	+1
Serbia	4	1	1	2	2	6	–4
Slovenia	2	1	1	0	1	0	+1
Spain	4	1	2	1	2	2	0
Sweden	5	2	1	2	5	9	–4
Switzerland	10	4	3	3	10	10	0
Turkey	6	0	2	4	4	11	–7

=== UEFA club ranking ===
In the table below, the current UEFA club ranking position for CFR Cluj is shown based on its current UEFA coefficient for the 2025–26 season.

As of 15 July 2025

Position	Club	Coefficient
91	(Germany) TSG Hoffenheim	19.000
92	(Romania) CFR Cluj	19.000
93	(Poland) Lech Poznań	19.000

== List of results ==
Notes for the abbreviations in the table below:

- 1R: First round
- 2R: Second round
- 3R: Third round
- SF: Semi-finals
- F: Final
- 1QR: First qualifying round
- 2QR: Second qualifying round
- 3QR: Third qualifying round
- PO: Play-off round
- R32: Round of 32
- KPO: Knockout round play-offs

Season	Competition	Round	Opponents	Home	Away	Aggregate
2005	UEFA Intertoto Cup	1R	(Lithuania) Vėtra	3–2	4–1	7–3
2005	UEFA Intertoto Cup	2R	(Spain) Athletic Bilbao	1–0	0–1 (a.e.t.)	1–1 (5–3 p)
2005	UEFA Intertoto Cup	3R	(France) Saint-Étienne	1–1	2–2	3–3 (a)
2005	UEFA Intertoto Cup	SF	(Lithuania) Žalgiris Vilnius	5–1	2–1	7–2
2005	UEFA Intertoto Cup	F	(France) Lens	1–1	1–3	2–4
2007–08	UEFA Cup	2QR	(Cyprus) Anorthosis Famagusta	1–3	0–0	1–3
2008–09	UEFA Champions League	Group A	(Italy) Roma	1–3	2–1	4th place
2008–09	UEFA Champions League	Group A	(England) Chelsea	0–0	1–2	4th place
2008–09	UEFA Champions League	Group A	(France) Bordeaux	1–2	0–1	4th place
2009–10	UEFA Europa League	PO	(Bosnia and Herzegovina) Sarajevo	2–1	1–1	3–2
2009–10	UEFA Europa League	Group K	(Denmark) Copenhagen	2–0	0–2	4th place
2009–10	UEFA Europa League	Group K	(Netherlands) PSV Eindhoven	0–2	0–1	4th place
2009–10	UEFA Europa League	Group K	(Czech Republic) Sparta Prague	2–3	0–2	4th place
2010–11	UEFA Champions League	Group E	(Switzerland) Basel	2–1	0–1	4th place
2010–11	UEFA Champions League	Group E	(Italy) Roma	1–1	1–2	4th place
2010–11	UEFA Champions League	Group E	(Germany) Bayern Munich	0–4	2–3	4th place
2012–13	UEFA Champions League	3QR	(Czech Republic) Slovan Liberec	1–0	2–1	3–1
2012–13	UEFA Champions League	PO	(Switzerland) Basel	1–0	2–1	3–1
2012–13	UEFA Champions League	Group H	(Portugal) Braga	3–1	2–0	3rd place
2012–13	UEFA Champions League	Group H	(England) Manchester United	1–2	1–0	3rd place
2012–13	UEFA Champions League	Group H	(Turkey) Galatasaray	1–3	1–1	3rd place
2012–13	UEFA Europa League	R32	(Italy) Internazionale	0–3	0–2	0–5
2014–15	UEFA Europa League	2QR	(Serbia) Jagodina	0–0	1–0	1–0
2014–15	UEFA Europa League	3QR	(Belarus) Dinamo Minsk	0–2	0–1	0–3
2018–19	UEFA Champions League	2QR	(Sweden) Malmö FF	0–1	1−1	1–2
2018–19	UEFA Europa League	3QR	(Armenia) Alashkert	5−0	2−0	7–0
2018–19	UEFA Europa League	PO	(Luxembourg) F91 Dudelange	2–3	0–2	2–5
2019–20	UEFA Champions League	1QR	(Kazakhstan) Astana	3−1	0–1	3–2
2019–20	UEFA Champions League	2QR	(Israel) Maccabi Tel Aviv	1–0	2–2	3–2
2019–20	UEFA Champions League	3QR	(Scotland) Celtic	1–1	4–3	5–4
2019–20	UEFA Champions League	PO	(Czech Republic) Slavia Prague	0–1	0–1	0–2
2019–20	UEFA Europa League	Group E	(Italy) Lazio	2–1	0–1	2nd place
2019–20	UEFA Europa League	Group E	(Scotland) Celtic	2–0	0–2	2nd place
2019–20	UEFA Europa League	Group E	(France) Rennes	1–0	1–0	2nd place
2019–20	UEFA Europa League	R32	(Spain) Sevilla	1–1	0–0	1–1 (a)
2020–21	UEFA Champions League	1QR	(Malta) Floriana	—N/a	2–0	—N/a
2020–21	UEFA Champions League	2QR	(Croatia) Dinamo Zagreb	2–2 (5–6 p)	—N/a	—N/a
2020–21	UEFA Europa League	3QR	(Sweden) Djurgårdens IF	—N/a	1–0	—N/a
2020–21	UEFA Europa League	PO	(Finland) KuPS	3–1	—N/a	—N/a
2020–21	UEFA Europa League	Group A	(Italy) Roma	0–2	0–5	3rd place
2020–21	UEFA Europa League	Group A	(Switzerland) Young Boys	1–1	1–2	3rd place
2020–21	UEFA Europa League	Group A	(Bulgaria) CSKA Sofia	0–0	2–0	3rd place
2021–22	UEFA Champions League	1QR	(Bosnia and Herzegovina) Borac Banja Luka	3–1	1–2 (a.e.t.)	4–3
2021–22	UEFA Champions League	2QR	(Gibraltar) Lincoln Red Imps	2–0	2–1	4–1
2021–22	UEFA Champions League	3QR	(Switzerland) Young Boys	1–1	1–3	2–4
2021–22	UEFA Europa League	PO	(Serbia) Red Star Belgrade	0–4	1–2	1–6
2021–22	UEFA Europa Conference League	Group D	(Netherlands) AZ	0–2	0–1	4th place
2021–22	UEFA Europa Conference League	Group D	(Czech Republic) Jablonec	0–1	2–0	4th place
2021–22	UEFA Europa Conference League	Group D	(Denmark) Randers	1–2	1–1	4th place
2022–23	UEFA Champions League	1QR	(Armenia) Pyunik	2–2 (a.e.t.)	0–0	2–2 (3–4 p)
2022–23	UEFA Europa Conference League	2QR	(Andorra) Inter Club d'Escaldes	3–0	1–1	4–1
2022–23	UEFA Europa Conference League	3QR	(Belarus) Shakhtyor Soligorsk	1–0	0–0	1–0
2022–23	UEFA Europa Conference League	PO	(Slovenia) Maribor	1–0	0–0	1–0
2022–23	UEFA Europa Conference League	Group G	(Czech Republic) Slavia Prague	2–0	1–0	2nd place
2022–23	UEFA Europa Conference League	Group G	(Turkey) Sivasspor	0–1	0–3	2nd place
2022–23	UEFA Europa Conference League	Group G	(Kosovo) Ballkani	1–0	1–1	2nd place
2022–23	UEFA Europa Conference League	KPO	(Italy) Lazio	0–0	0–1	0–1
2023–24	UEFA Europa Conference League	2QR	(Turkey) Adana Demirspor	1–1	1–2	2–3
2024–25	UEFA Conference League	2QR	(Belarus) Neman Grodno	0–0	5–0	5–0
2024–25	UEFA Conference League	3QR	(Israel) Maccabi Petah Tikva	1–0	1–0	2–0
2024–25	UEFA Conference League	PO	(Cyprus) Pafos	1–0	0–3	1–3
2025–26	UEFA Europa League	1QR	(Hungary) Paks	3–0	0–0	3–0
2025–26	UEFA Europa League	2QR	(Switzerland) Lugano	1–0 (a.e.t.)	0–0	1–0
2025–26	UEFA Europa League	3QR	(Portugal) Braga	1–2	0–2	1–4
2025–26	UEFA Conference League	PO	(Sweden) BK Häcken	1–0	2–7	3–7
2026–27	UEFA Conference League	2QR	(Armenia) Alashkert	3–0	1–1	4–1
2026–27	UEFA Conference League	3QR	(Norway) Tromsø	0–5	1–2	1–7
