= Miclăuș =

Miclăuș is a Romanian surname. Notable people with the surname include:

- Casian Miclăuș (born 1977), Romanian footballer
- Petre Miclăuș (born 1939), Romanian gymnast
