= Cristian Turcu =

Romanian footballer

Personal information
- Date of birth: 25 December 1976 (age 49)
- Place of birth: Bucharest, Romania
- Height: 1.84 m (6 ft 0 in)
- Position: Striker

Youth career
- Faur București

Senior career*
Years	Team	Apps	(Gls)
1994–1998	Faur București (Note: The statistics for the 1995–96, 1996–97 and 1997–98 Divizia C seasons are unavailable.)	13	(2)
1998–2003	Gloria Bistrița	118	(19)
2003–2006	CFR Cluj	58	(15)
2006	FC Brașov	15	(4)
2007–2008	FC Snagov (Note: The statistics for the 2007–08 Divizia C season are unavailable.)	11	(3)
2009–2010	Viitorul Toporu		
2011	Turris Turnu Măgurele		
2012	Tunari		
Total		215	(43)
- * Club domestic league appearances and goals

Cristian Turcu (born 25 December 1976) is a Romanian former footballer who played as a striker. He scored a goal in the first leg of the 2005 UEFA Intertoto Cup final against Lens.

== Honours ==
CFR Cluj

- Divizia B: 2003–04
- UEFA Intertoto Cup runner-up: 2005

FC Snagov

- Divizia C: 2007–08
