= Radu Sabo =

Romanian footballer

Personal information
- Date of birth: 13 September 1971 (age 55)
- Place of birth: Cluj-Napoca, Romania
- Height: 1.78 m (5 ft 10 in)
- Position: Midfielder

Youth career
- Universitatea Cluj

Senior career*
| Years | Team | Apps | (Gls) |
| 1988–1996 | Universitatea Cluj | 186 | (36) |
| 1996–1997 | Gloria Bistrița | 37 | (13) |
| 1997–1998 | Baia Mare | 11 | (1) |
| 1998–2000 | Debrecen | 50 | (15) |
| 2000–2005 | Zalaegerszeg | 136 | (32) |
| 2005–2008 | Universitatea Cluj | 44 | (12) |
| 2008–2009 | Sănătatea Cluj | | |
| 2010 | Sănătatea Cluj | | |
| Total | | 464 | (109) |

Managerial career
- 2008–2009: Sănătatea Cluj
- 2009: Universitatea Cluj (assistant)
- 2010: Sănătatea Cluj
- * Club domestic league appearances and goals

Radu Sabo (born 13 September 1971) is a Romanian former footballer who played as a midfielder.

== Playing career ==
=== Universitatea Cluj ===
Sabo was born on 13 September 1971 in Cluj-Napoca, Romania and began playing junior-level football at local club Universitatea. On 14 December 1988, coach Remus Vlad gave him his Divizia A debut in Universitatea's 5–2 away loss to Victoria București in which he scored once. In 1991, the team was relegated to Divizia B, but Sabo stayed with the club, scoring five goals in the 25 matches coach Ioan Sdrobiș used him, helping the club get promoted back to the first league after one year. In the following four seasons he would appear regularly for the team, scoring a personal record of 12 goals in the 1995–96 season.

=== Gloria Bistrița and Baia Mare ===
In 1996, Sabo was transferred to Gloria Bistrița where he worked once again with Remus Vlad. He played four games in the 1996–97 Cup Winners' Cup, helping them eliminate Valletta in the qualifying round, being eliminated with 2–1 on aggregate by Gabriel Batistuta's Fiorentina in the first round. In the middle of the 1997–98 season, he left Gloria to join Divizia B club Baia Mare for half a year.

=== Debrecen ===
In 1998, Sabo went abroad to Hungarian side, Debrecen where he was teammates with fellow Romanians Nicolae Ilea, Liviu Goian and Cornel Cașolțan. He made his Nemzeti Bajnokság I debut on 1 August 1998 when coach András Herczeg sent him in the 69th minute to replace Gábor Bagoly in a 0–0 draw against Diósgyőr. On 14 November he scored his first goal in the league in a 2–1 away win over MTK Budapest. He also scored in the following round in a 4–0 victory against Gázszer in which he also received a red card. In his first game after his suspension, Sabo scored a brace against Diósgyőr, then in April 1999 he netted a hat-trick in a 6–1 success over Ferencváros. At the end of the season, Sabo won the first trophy of his career when coach Lajos Garamvölgyi used him as a starter in the 2–1 win over Tatabánya in the 1998–99 Magyar Kupa final. In the following season he scored a brace in a 2–1 victory against VfL Wolfsburg in the 1999–2000 UEFA Cup first round, but the qualification was lost as they were defeated with 2–0 in the first leg.

=== Zalaegerszeg ===
In 2000, Sabo was transferred to Zalaegerszeg. He scored his first goal for the team on 29 September in a 1–1 draw against Videoton, netting nine goals in his first season, including three doubles in three wins against Videoton, Tatabánya and Vasas which helped the club avoid relegation. In the following season, coach Péter Bozsik gave him 29 appearances in which he scored four goals. One of these goals was netted in a 1–1 draw against Ferencváros which helped the team earn the point that mathematically granted them the title. Afterwards he played in the 2002–03 Champions League qualifying rounds, appearing in both legs as Zalaegerszeg eliminated NK Zagreb, the team being defeated with 5–1 on aggregate in the following round by Manchester United, but without Sabo playing. Subsequently, the club played in the UEFA Cup first round where he appeared in both legs, scoring one goal in the eventual 9–1 loss on aggregate to Dinamo Zagreb. He also netted a hat-trick in a 3–3 draw against Újpest in the league championship. Sabo played three more seasons at Zalaegerszeg, accumulating a total of 186 Nemzeti Bajnokság I matches with 47 goals.

=== Return to Universitatea Cluj ===
After eight seasons played in Hungary, Sabo returned to his first team, Universitatea Cluj, which was playing in the second league. He was the team's top-scorer during the 2006–07 season, as they earned promotion to the first league under coach Adrian Falub. In the following season he scored two goals in two losses to FC Vaslui and Dinamo București, having netted a total of 51 in his 218 matches in the Romanian first league. His final appearance in the competition was in the last game of the season, a 1–0 loss in the Cluj derby against CFR after which the latter won the title and his side was relegated back to the second division. Shortly afterwards he became a player-coach at Sănătatea Cluj where he played in the Romanian lower leagues until 2010.

== Coaching career ==
Sabo started coaching in 2008 when he was a player-coach at Sănătatea Cluj with whom he finished the season in 10th place in the Romanian third league. In October 2009 he was appointed as Cristian Dulca's assistant at Universitatea Cluj where he stayed for two months, returning in 2010 as player-coach at Sănătatea.

== Honours ==
Universitatea Cluj

- Liga II: 1991–92, 2006–07

Debrecen

- Magyar Kupa: 1998–99

Zalaegerszeg

- Nemzeti Bajnokság I: 2001–02
