= CS Sănătatea Servicii Publice Cluj =

Romanian football club

Sănătatea Cluj
- Full name: Club Sportiv Sănătatea Servicii Publice Cluj
- Nickname: Virușii Verzi (The Green Viruses)
- Short name: SSP Cluj
- Founded: 1986; 40 years ago
- Ground: Clujana
- Capacity: 2,000
- Owner: Aurelian Ghișa
- Manager: Vasile Miriuță
- Head coach: Vasile Miriuță
- League: Liga III
- 2025–26: Liga III, Seria III, 3rd
- Website: http://www.cssanatatea.ro/
Home colours	Away colours

Club Sportiv Sănătatea Servicii Publice Cluj, commonly known as Sănătatea Cluj, or simply Sănătatea, is a Romanian professional football club based in Cluj-Napoca, Cluj County. The club currently competes in Liga III, the third tier of Romanian football.

The club's greatest performances were achieved in the Cupa României, where it managed to reach the Round of 16 in the 2007–08 and 2019–20 seasons, the Round of 32 in the 2009–10, 2011–12, 2013–14, and 2017–18 seasons, and the Group Stage in the 2023–24 season.

== History ==
Sănătatea Cluj was founded in 1986, at the initiative of individuals devoted to football within the Cluj County Health Directorate, with Vasile Moldovan as the organizer and coach, and Dr. Dumitru Predescu as the president of the football section. Among the first players of the team were David Borza, Eugen Perde, Sergiu Dascăl, Ioan Abrudan, Dănuț Radu, Ilisie Dascăl, as well as the youth players Cristian Fărcășan, Sándor Balint, and others.

The club competed in the Cluj County Championships for nearly twenty years before earning promotion to Divizia C at the end of the 2004–05 season, after winning Divizia D – Cluj County. In the third division, The Green Viruses secured 3rd place in Series VIII during the 2005–06 season, followed by a 10th-place finish in Series V the next year.

In the 2007–08 season, Sănătatea narrowly avoided relegation, finishing 14th in Series VI but also achieved one of the greatest performances in club history by reaching the Round of 16 in Cupa României. The cup run began with victories over Someșul Ileanda (4–1), Minerul Iara (2–1), and Victoria Carei (2–1). The fourth round brought a stunning 1–0 victory over Gaz Metan Mediaș, followed by wins against Unirea Alba Iulia (3–2) and top-flight side UTA Arad (1–0). It ended in the Round of 16 with a 0–4 defeat against reigning champions Dinamo București at the Dr. Constantin Rădulescu Stadium in Gruia. The squad, led by Ovidiu Rațiu, included Sabin Pîglișan, Gavrilă Molnar, Rareș Hoca, Alin Cazan, Alin Albu, Radu Zah, Csaba Kiss, Călin Timicer, Simon, Horică Gabor, I. Rusu, Aurelian Ghișa, C. Nicula, Alexandru Gașpar.

Sănătatea continued to compete in Series VI of Liga III, finishing 9th in the 2008–09 season under player-coach Radu Sabo. In the following season, the "Green Viruses" reached the Round of 32 in Cupa României after eliminating higher-ranked teams such as Universitatea Cluj and FCM Târgu Mureș, both with 1–0 victories. The campaign ended in September with a heavy 0–7 defeat against Politehnica Timișoara. Sabo left in October 2009 and was replaced by Marius Semeniuc, who led the team to an 11th-place finish.

After another short stint under Sabo in the fall of 2010, the team was coached by Marius Semeniuc in the following seasons, finishing 8th in the 2010–11 season and advancing once again to the Round of 32 in Cupa României after eliminating Unirea Florești (3–1), Someșul Oar (2–1), FC Bihor (1–0), and Arieșul Turda (5–1), before losing to FCSB (0–4). The squad for that match consisted of S. Pâglișan, C. Miclăuș, C. Sărmășan, S. Sos, C. Kiss, A. Albu, A. Simioancă, A. Gașpar ('81 A. Ghișa), S. Crișan, R. Rus ('69 R. Hoca), and I. Ganea ('46 C. Nicula). The team finished 11th in the 2011–12 Liga III season.

In the 2012–13 season, Sănătatea Cluj finished 9th in Series V, spared from relegation due to the withdrawal of several teams. In the following campaign, the Green-Viruses finished 8th in the regular season of Series V and ranked 9th after the series play-out. Sănătatea also reached the Round of 16 in the 2013–14 Cupa României, where it lost 0–4 to Dinamo București. The lineup used by Marius Semeniuc in that match was composed of A. Todoran, D. Bucur, P. Șimon, L. Perde, C. Sărmașan, C. Nicula, A. Albu, S. Sos, C. Kiss, L. Văidean, A. Gașpar. Reserves included Vl. Pop, S. Vădana, A. Ghișa, A. Ceaca, A. Boska, Al. Pop, T. Tothazan.

The following season, Sănătatea dropped to 12th place, but the 2015–16 campaign saw a notable improvement, with the team finishing 6th. The 2016–17 season marked one of the club’s best league performances, as Sănătatea secured 3rd place in Series V. In 2017, Marius Semeniuc was appointed general manager, while Csaba Kiss took over as head coach, leading the team to a 7th-place finish in the 2017–18 season. The Green Viruses also reached the Round of 32 in Cupa României, where they suffered a 1–6 defeat against FCSB. The lineup for that match included Lăzăreanu, Cr. Paul, D. Matei (Misăraș 74′), Negru, Țîrlea, Vitan (D. Bucur 61′), Ciupe, Yuh, Ad. Lupu, Ceaca (Ititesc 65′), and Gașpar, with Todoran, A. Ghișa, Bria, and Indreica as reserves.

== Honours ==
Liga IV – Cluj County

- Winners (1): 2004–05

== Players ==
=== First-team squad ===
As of 10 September 2024

Note: Flags indicate national team as defined under FIFA eligibility rules; some limited exceptions apply. Players may hold more than one non-FIFA nationality.

No.	Pos.	Nation	Player
1	GK	ROU	Ștefan Grecu
3	DF	ROU	Răzvan Lazăr
4	DF	ROU	Damian Cimpoeșu (Captain)
5	DF	ROU	Nicholas Pop
6	DF	ROU	Răzvan Stretea
7	MF	ROU	Andrei Dioszegi
8	MF	CMR	Moses Yuh
9	FW	ROU	Tudor Cociș
10	MF	ROU	Darius Vescan
11	FW	ROU	Alin Baciu
12	GK	ROU	Claudiu Chindriș
13	DF	ROU	Cătălin Creț

No.	Pos.	Nation	Player
14	DF	ROU	Alberto Clada
15	DF	GHA	Gaddo Abubakar
16	MF	ROU	Ianis Gorgotă
17	FW	ROU	Mihai Bonț
19	MF	BFA	Laley Fofana
20	MF	GHA	Joseph Aidoo
21	FW	ROU	Dorin Goga
22	DF	ROU	Márton Szőlősi
23	DF	ROU	Răzvan Negreanu
33	MF	COL	Andreas Orozco
96	MF	ROU	Denis Paul
99	GK	ROU	Mircea Ciaca

=== Out on loan ===
Note: Flags indicate national team as defined under FIFA eligibility rules; some limited exceptions apply. Players may hold more than one non-FIFA nationality.

No. / Pos. / Nation / Player	No. / Pos. / Nation / Player

== Club officials ==
=== Board of directors ===
Role	Name
Owner	(Romania) Aurelian Ghișa
General Manager	(Romania) Vasile Miriuță
Director of Competitions	(Romania) Ovidiu Rațiu

=== Current technical staff ===
Role	Name
Head coach	(Romania) Vasile Miriuță
Assistant coach	(Romania) Cosmin Tilincă
Delegate	(Romania) Csaba Kiss

== Notable former players ==
The footballers mentioned below have played at least 1 season for Sănătatea and also played in Liga I for another team.

- (Romania) Raul Ciupe
- (Romania) Florin Dan
- (Romania) Bogdan Dolha
- (Romania) George Florescu
- (Romania) Ionel Ganea
- (Romania) Dorin Goga
- (Romania) Filip Lăzăreanu
- (Romania) Casian Miclăuș
- (Romania) Ionuț Rada
- (Romania) Dan Roman
- (Romania) Radu Sabo
- (Romania) Cosmin Tilincă

== Former managers ==
- (Romania) Radu Sabo (2008–2009)
- (Romania) Marius Semeniuc (2009–2010)
- (Romania) Radu Sabo (2010)
- (Romania) George Florescu (2021–2023)
- (Romania) Francisc Dican (2023–2024)

== League and Cup history ==
Season	Tier	Division	Place	Notes	Cupa României
2025–26	3	Liga III (Seria VIII)	TBD		Group Stage
2024–25	3	Liga III (Seria X)	6th		Group stage
2023–24	3	Liga III (Seria X)	9th		
2022–23	3	Liga III (Seria IX)	9th		
2021–22	3	Liga III (Seria IX)	6th		
2020–21	3	Liga III (Seria IX)	8th		
2019–20	3	Liga III (Seria V)	11th		Round of 16
2018–19	3	Liga III (Seria V)	5th		
2017–18	3	Liga III (Seria V)	7th		Round of 32
2016–17	3	Liga III (Seria V)	3rd		
2015–16	3	Liga III (Seria V)	6th		

Season	Tier	Division	Place	Notes	Cupa României
2014–15	3	Liga III (Seria V)	12th		
2013–14	3	Liga III (Seria V)	9th		Round of 32
2012–13	3	Liga III (Seria V)	9th		
2011–12	3	Liga III (Seria VI)	11th		Round of 32
2010–11	3	Liga III (Seria VI)	8th		
2009–10	3	Liga III (Seria VI)	11th		Round of 32
2008–09	3	Liga III (Seria VI)	9th		
2007–08	3	Liga III (Seria VI)	14th		Round of 16
2006–07	3	Liga III (Seria V)	10th		
2005–06	3	Divizia C (Seria VIII)	3rd		
