= Casian Miclăuș =

Romanian footballer

Personal information
- Full name: Casian Vasile Miclăuș
- Date of birth: 14 August 1977 (age 49)
- Place of birth: Mediaș, Romania
- Height: 1.74 m (5 ft 8 1/2 in)
- Position: Left back

Youth career
- Gaz Metan Mediaș

Senior career*
Years	Team	Apps	(Gls)
1995–1999	Gaz Metan Mediaș	89	(3)
1999–2000	Universitatea Craiova	17	(0)
2000–2003	Gaz Metan Mediaș	59	(0)
2003–2005	Brașov	54	(0)
2005–2008	CFR Cluj	38	(0)
2008	→ Dacia Mioveni (loan)	6	(0)
2008–2009	Gloria Bistrița	16	(0)
2009–2011	FCM Târgu Mureș	10	(0)
2011–2015	Sănătatea Cluj		
Total		289	(3)
- * Club domestic league appearances and goals as of 1 March 2018

Casian Vasile Miclăuș (born 14 August 1977) is a Romanian former footballer who played as a left back.

== Career ==
Miclăuș was born on 14 August 1977 in Mediaș, Romania and began playing football during the 1995–96 Divizia B season at local club Gaz Metan. He joined Universitatea Craiova, making his Divizia A debut on 10 April 1999 under coach Marian Bondrea in a 2–1 victory against Gloria Bistrița. In 2000, he returned to Gaz Metan, this time in the first league, but could not avoid the team's relegation to Divizia B at the end of the 1999–2000 season. After playing two more seasons for Gaz Metan in Divizia B, Miclăuș returned to first-league football in 2003 by joining Brașov. Following Brașov's relegation to Divizia B in the 2004–05 season, he joined CFR Cluj and was presented at a press conference alongside Martin Tudor and Alin Minteuan. Under coach Dorinel Munteanu, he played four games in the 2005 Intertoto Cup campaign as CFR got past Saint-Étienne and Žalgiris, reaching the final where they were defeated 4–2 on aggregate by Lens. Afterwards, he helped CFR earn a third place in the 2006–07 season. For the 2008–09 season, Miclăuș was loaned to Dacia Mioveni but was unable to help the team avoid relegation. Subsequently, he was transferred from CFR to Gloria Bistrița. There, he made his last Liga I appearance on 23 May 2009 in a 3–1 away loss to Gaz Metan Mediaș, totaling 156 matches in the competition. Miclăuș spent the 2009–10 season at second-tier club FCM Târgu Mureș, helping them gain promotion to the first league. He ended his career after playing a few years in the third league for Sănătatea Cluj.

== Honours ==
CFR Cluj

- Intertoto Cup runner-up: 2005

FCM Târgu Mureș

- Liga II: 2009–10
