= Vasile Miriuță =

Footballer (born 1968)

Personal information
- Date of birth: 19 September 1968 (age 58)
- Place of birth: Baia Mare, Romania
- Height: 1.86 m (6 ft 1 in)
- Position: Attacking midfielder

Team information
- Current team: Sănătatea Cluj (head coach)

Youth career
- 1982–1988: Maramureș Baia Mare

Senior career*
Years	Team	Apps	(Gls)
1986–1990	Maramureș Baia Mare		
1991–1992	Dinamo București	15	(1)
1991	→ Gloria Bistrița (loan)	14	(3)
1992	→ Győr (loan)	15	(2)
1992–1993	Győr	28	(3)
1993–1994	Bourges	27	(3)
1994–1995	Győr	39	(14)
1996	Videoton	14	(5)
1996–1998	Ferencváros	54	(12)
1998	Újpest	0	(0)
1998–2002	Energie Cottbus	121	(23)
2003	MSV Duisburg	12	(0)
2003	Győr	15	(4)
2004	Budapest Honvéd	0	(0)
2004–2006	SV Stegersbach		
2006–2007	Délegyháza KSE		
2007–2009	Semjénháza SE		
2009–2010	Törökbálinti TC		
Total		354	(70)

International career
2000–2003	Hungary	9	(1)

Managerial career
- 2010: Energie Cottbus (assistant)
- 2010–2011: Energie Cottbus U19
- 2011–2013: Energie Cottbus II
- 2013: Ceahlăul Piatra Neamț
- 2013–2014: CFR Cluj
- 2014–2015: Győr
- 2015: ASA Târgu Mureș
- 2015–2016: Energie Cottbus
- 2016–2017: CFR Cluj
- 2017: Concordia Chiajna
- 2017–2018: Dinamo București
- 2018–2019: Hermannstadt
- 2019: Kisvárda
- 2020: Hermannstadt
- 2020–2021: Minaur Baia Mare
- 2021–2023: Minaur Baia Mare (technical director)
- 2023: Minaur Baia Mare
- 2023: Chindia Târgoviște
- 2024–2025: Sănătatea Cluj
- 2025: Politehnica Iași
- 2025–: Sănătatea Cluj
- * Club domestic league appearances and goals

Vasile Miriuță (born 19 September 1968) is a professional football manager and former player who is currently in charge of Liga III club Sănătatea Cluj.

Famous for his free kicks and tactical cleverness, the attacking midfielder most notably played for Energie Cottbus in the late 1990s and early 2000s, with whom he was promoted to the Bundesliga in 2000. Born in Romania, Miriuță played nine matches for the Hungary national team, in which he scored one goal.

== Club career ==
Miriuță debuted as a player in 1986 for Maramureș Baia Mare. In 1991, he was signed by Dinamo București. At Dinamo, Miriuță became an undisputed regular, until new coach Florin Halagian allegedly told him that he's not going to play a single game in his term, prompting him to leave for Gloria Bistrița in 1991. After one season at Gloria, he returned at Dinamo.

=== Hungary ===
In 1992, tired with his status as a substitute at Dinamo, Miriuță signed with Hungarian side Győr. He soon became a popular figure among the supporters. In 1993, Miriuță was signed by French side Bourges, but returns to Győr after only one season. In 1996, Miriuță moved to Videoton, but after playing four games and scoring three goals for the Székesfehérvár club, he is signed by Ferencváros. After two years at Ferencváros, Miriuță signed with rivals Újpest, but did not play on league games for the Purples.

=== Energie Cottbus ===
In 1998, Miriuța signed with 2. Bundesliga side Energie Cottbus. He soon became undisputed regular for the club and helped the team avoid relegation in the Regionalliga Nordost in his first season for the club. In 2000, Miriuță promoted in Bundesliga with Cottbus, and during their first season in the top tier became one of the regulars of the famous all-foreign line-up. He scored 12 goals in Bundesliga in the 2000–01 season and was voted into the Bundesliga Best XI. Despite this, Miriuță was released in 2002.

=== Late career ===
In 2002, he signed with 2. Bundesliga side MSV Duisburg, but was mostly used as a substitute.

In 2003, Miriuță returned to Győr for the third time in his career, for a season. In 2004, he signed with Budapest Honvéd, but ended his contract following a dispute with the coach, then retired.

== International career ==
In 2000, Miriuță received a phone call from a messenger of Prime Minister Viktor Orbán announcing him that he obtained Hungarian citizenship, for which he applied in 1994, and asking him to play for the national team. He made his debut for Hungary in a 1–0 friendly win over Macedonia.

In three years playing for Hungary, Miriuță earned 9 caps and scored a goal in a 1–1 friendly draw against Spain.

=== International stats ===
Appearances and goals by national team and year
National team	Year	Apps	Goals
Hungary	2000	1	0
Hungary	2001	3	0
Hungary	2002	3	1
Hungary	2003	2	0
Total		9	1

Scores and results list Hungary's goal tally first, score column indicates score after each Miriuță goal.

List of international goals scored by Vasile Miriuță
No.	Date	Venue	Opponent	Score	Result	Competition	Ref.
1	21 August 2002	Ferenc Puskás Stadion, Budapest, Hungary	Spain	1–1	1–1	Friendly	

== Honours ==
=== Coach ===
CFR Cluj

- Supercupa României runner-up: 2016

Minaur Baia Mare

- Liga III: 2020–21
