= Bogdan Dolha =

Romanian former football midfielder

Personal information
- Full name: Bogdan Alexandru Dolha
- Date of birth: 4 October 1984 (age 42)
- Place of birth: Cluj-Napoca, Romania
- Height: 1.75 m (5 ft 9 in)
- Position: Midfielder

Youth career
- Universitatea Cluj

Senior career*
Years	Team	Apps	(Gls)
2002–2010	Universitatea Cluj	80	(2)
2004	→ Minerul Iara (loan)	?	(?)
2004–2005	→ Avântul Reghin (loan)	?	(?)
2010–2011	Arieşul Turda	13	(0)
2011–2012	Universitatea II Cluj	?	(?)
2012–2013	Unirea Jucu	?	(?)
2013–2015	Sănătatea Cluj	?	(?)
Total		93+	(2+)
- * Club domestic league appearances and goals as of 27 February 2018

Bogdan Alexandru Dolha (born 4 October 1984) is a Romanian former football midfielder. In his career Dolha played mainly for teams from Cluj County, such as Universitatea Cluj, Arieşul Turda, Unirea Jucu, Sănătatea Cluj and Minerul Iara.

== Club career ==
Dolha started his football career at Universitatea Cluj youth team. His first trainer was Mircea Cojocariu. In 2002, he won the national junior title. The debut for the senior team was made in the 2002–2003 season. In 2004 Bogdan Dolha was loaned to the Liga III team Minerul Iara which was at that time Universitatea Cluj's satellite. One year later he was loaned again to a third league team, Avântul Reghin. In 2005 Dolha turned back to Universitatea Cluj and helped the team finish third in Liga II. In 2007, he promoted with Universitatea Cluj in Liga I.
