= Filip Lăzăreanu =

Romanian footballer

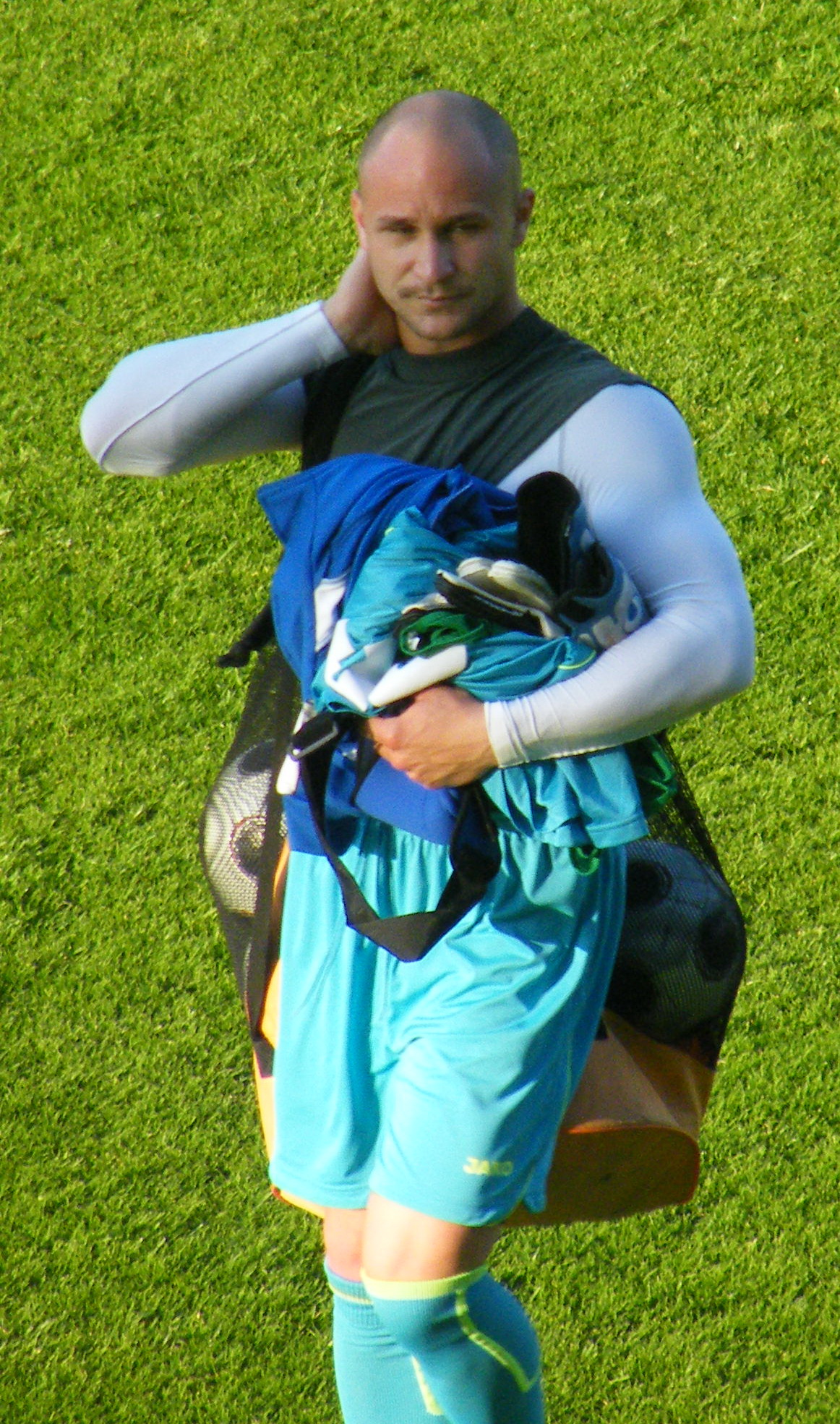

Personal information
- Date of birth: 5 July 1981 (age 45)
- Place of birth: Cluj-Napoca, Romania
- Height: 1.81 m (5 ft 11 in)
- Position: Goalkeeper

Youth career
- Universitatea Cluj

Senior career*
| Years | Team | Apps | (Gls) |
| 1998–2001 | Universitatea Cluj | 21 | (0) |
| 2001–2003 | CFR Cluj | 2 | (0) |
| 2003–2005 | Armătura Zalău | 52 | (0) |
| 2005–2007 | Bihor Oradea | 19 | (0) |
| 2006–2007 | Petrolul Ploiești | 8 | (0) |
| 2007–2009 | Nyíregyháza Spartacus | 38 | (0) |
| 2009–2010 | Kecskemét | 14 | (0) |
| 2010–2011 | Botoșani | 5 | (0) |
| 2011–2013 | Gloria Bistrița | 9 | (0) |
| 2013–2014 | UTA Arad | 6 | (0) |
| 2014–2015 | Whitehawk | 0 | (0) |
| 2016–2021 | Sănătatea Cluj | 106 | (0) |
| Total | | 271 | (0) |

Managerial career
- 2022–2023: Sănătatea Cluj (GK Coach)
- * Club domestic league appearances and goals as of 11:11, 24 November 2023 (UTC)

Filip Lăzăreanu (born 5 July 1981) is a Romanian former footballer who played as a goalkeeper for teams such as Universitatea Cluj, Bihor Oradea, Petrolul Ploiești or Sănătatea Cluj, among others. His father, Marcel Lăzăreanu, was also a goalkeeper.
