= Cosmin Tilincă =

Romanian footballer (born 1979)

Personal information
- Full name: Cosmin Augustin Tilincă
- Date of birth: 1 August 1979 (age 47)
- Place of birth: Turda, Romania
- Height: 1.79 m (5 ft 10 in)
- Position: Striker

Team information
- Current team: Sănătatea Cluj (assistant)

Senior career*
| Years | Team | Apps | (Gls) |
| 1997–2002 | Arieșul Turda | | |
| 2002–2007 | CFR Cluj | 97 | (23) |
| 2007 | Farul Constanța | 11 | (1) |
| 2007–2008 | Gloria Bistrița | 30 | (6) |
| 2008–2011 | Pandurii Târgu Jiu | 36 | (5) |
| 2011–2015 | Arieșul Turda | 18 | (3) |
| 2015–2016 | Germania Okriftel | 26 | (14) |
| 2016–2017 | TSV Trebur | 40 | (11) |
| 2017 | SKV Mörfelden | 0 | (0) |
| 2018–2023 | Sănătatea Cluj | 70 | (19) |
| Total | | 328 | (82) |

Managerial career
- 2012–2015: Arieșul Turda (assistant)
- 2016–2017: TSV Trebur (assistant)
- 2024–: Sănătatea Cluj (assistant)
- * Club domestic league appearances and goals as of 10:11, 1 November 2024 (UTC)

Cosmin Augustin Tilincă (born 1 August 1979) is a Romanian former footballer.

== Club career ==
Tilincă was born on 1 August 1979 in Turda, Romania and began playing junior-level football at local club Arieșul. In 1997 he started to play for Arieșul's senior squad in Divizia C. In 2002 he went to play at Divizia B level, signing with CFR Cluj. In the 2003–04 season, he scored three goals to help the team earn promotion to the first division, making a partnership in the offence with Adrian Anca. In the following season, Tilincă made his Divizia A debut on 21 August 2004 when coach Aurel Șunda sent him in the 65th minute to replace Sead Brunčević in CFR's 4–2 win over Apulum Alba Iulia. He scored his first goal on 11 June 2005 in a 2–1 home victory against FC Brașov. Under coach Dorinel Munteanu, he played ten games in the 2005 Intertoto Cup campaign as CFR got past Vėtra, Athletic Bilbao, Saint-Étienne and Žalgiris, scoring seven goals against all these opponents, with the team reaching the final where they were defeated 4–2 on aggregate by Lens. With those seven goals scored, Tilincă was the top-scorer of the competition, and earned the nickname Tili-goal.

In February 2007 he signed with Farul Constanța which paid €40,000 to CFR, being wanted there by coach Basarab Panduru. Until the end of the season, Tilincă made 11 league appearances for Farul, scoring once in a 1–1 draw against Steaua București. He then went to Gloria Bistrița for the 2007–08 season. Under the coach Ioan Sabău, he played five games in the 2007 Intertoto Cup campaign as Gloria eliminated Grbalj and Maccabi Haifa, scoring once against the latter. They reached the final where he netted once and provided the assist to Dorel Zaharia's goal in a 2–1 home victory against Atlético Madrid, but the second leg was lost with 1–0, thus losing the final on the away goals rule. In 2008, Tilincă joined Pandurii Târgu Jiu where on 6 November 2009 he netted his last goal in the Romanian league in a 1–1 draw against his former side, Gloria Bistrița. He made his last first league appearance on 22 May 2010 in Pandurii's 1–0 away win over Unirea Alba Iulia, totaling 135 matches with 23 goals in the competition.

Afterwards, Tilincă returned to his hometown at Arieșul, playing for them in the Romanian lower leagues until 2015. He then went to play in the German lower leagues for Germania Okriftel, TSV Trebur and SKV Mörfelden. In 2018 he came back to Romania, signing with Sănătatea Cluj where he stayed until his retirement in 2023.

== International career ==
In 2005, Tilincă was called up by coach Victor Pițurcă at Romania's national team, to play in friendlies against Ivory Coast and Nigeria. However, due to an injury suffered in a training match against Sportul Studențesc București, he did not get to play in those games.

== Honours ==
CFR Cluj

- Divizia B: 2003–04
- UEFA Intertoto Cup runner-up: 2005

Gloria Bistrița

- UEFA Intertoto Cup runner-up: 2007
