= Raul Ciupe =

Romanian footballer

Personal information
- Full name: Raul Axente Ciupe
- Date of birth: 24 November 1983 (age 42)
- Place of birth: Cluj-Napoca, Romania
- Height: 1.77 m (5 ft 10 in)
- Positions: Right back; midfielder

Senior career*
Years	Team	Apps	(Gls)
2003–2004	Gaz Metan Mediaș	11	(0)
2004–2011	Sportul Studențesc	120	(1)
2011–2012	FC Brașov	14	(0)
2012–2015	Universitatea Cluj	73	(1)
2015	Viitorul Constanța	6	(0)
2016	Universitatea Cluj	11	(2)
2016–2021	Sănătatea Cluj	88	(12)
Total		323	(16)

International career^{‡}
2004–2005	Romania U-21	5	(0)
- * Club domestic league appearances and goals as of 14:24, 5 October 2021 (UTC) ‡ National team caps and goals as of 14:24, 5 October 2021 (UTC)

Raul Axente Ciupe (born 24 November 1983) is a Romanian former footballer who played as a right back or midfielder for teams such as Sportul Studențesc, Universitatea Cluj or Sănătatea Cluj, among others.

== Career ==
After playing for Gaz Metan Mediaș in Divizia B, Ciupe made his top-flight debut on 31 July 2004 as a Sportul Studențesc player, in a match against Unirea Alba-Iulia.

Playing for the Romania national under-21 football team in a match against Macedonia, he was fouled by Goran Popov and suffered a broken tibia. Minutes earlier, another Macedonian player, Hristijan Kirovski, was sent off after also fouling Ciupe. The right-back completely missed the 2005–2006 season because of the injury.

Ciupe played seven years for Sportul Studențesc before joining FC Brașov in November 2011. In June 2012 he was transferred by his hometown team Universitatea Cluj for whom he managed to score his first goals in Liga I, against Astra Ploiești and the local rivals from CFR Cluj.
