= Christophe Maraninchi =

French footballer (born 1983)

Personal information
- Date of birth: February 17, 1983 (age 43)
- Place of birth: Toulon, France
- Height: 1.86 m (6 ft 1 in)
- Position: Midfielder

Senior career*
Years	Team	Apps	(Gls)
2000–2002	Auxerre (C team)		
2002–2003	Nantes (B team)		
2003–2004	Gazélec Ajaccio		
2004–2006	Neuchâtel Xamax	40	(3)
2006–2007	Sporting Toulon Var		
2007–2010	Hyères FC		
2011-2012	SC Toulon-Le Las		
2012-2015	Sporting Toulon Var		
- * Club domestic league appearances and goals as of 19 February 2024

Christophe Maraninchi (born February 17, 1983) is a former French professional footballer.

He played on the professional level in Swiss Super League for Neuchâtel Xamax. He also played with Xamax in the 2005 UEFA Intertoto Cup, scoring one goal against FC Ararat Yerevan and one against AS Saint-Étienne.

Maraninchi joined Sporting Toulon Var in 2012 and retired in 2015.
