= Sead Brunčević =

Serbian association football player

Personal information
- Full name: Sead Brunčević
- Date of birth: 15 May 1977 (age 49)
- Place of birth: Novi Pazar, SFR Yugoslavia
- Height: 1.90 m (6 ft 3 in)
- Position: Midfielder

Team information
- Current team: FK Novi Pazar (Director of football)

Youth career
- Novi Pazar

Senior career*
| Years | Team | Apps | (Gls) |
| 1998–2000 | Novi Pazar | 51 | (16) |
| 2000–2002 | Remont Čačak | 56 | (32) |
| 2002–2003 | NK Zagreb | 19 | (1) |
| 2003–2004 | Borac Čačak | 25 | (3) |
| 2004–2006 | CFR Cluj | 35 | (4) |
| 2006–2007 | Gloria Bistrița | 15 | (1) |
| 2007–2009 | Novi Pazar | 40 | (7) |
| Total | | 241 | (64) |
- * Club domestic league appearances and goals

Sead Brunčević (Serbian Cyrillic: Сеад Брунчевић; born 15 May 1977) is a Serbian retired footballer.

== Club career ==
Born in Novi Pazar, Brunčević began his career playing for FK Novi Pazar in Serbian second division. In the 2001/02 season he moved to FK Remont Čačak and played in Serbian First League. 2002 he moved to Croatia and played in NK Zagreb in Prva HNL. After one season, he moved back to Serbia and played in First League of Serbia and Montenegro with FK Borac Čačak. In 2004 Sead moved to Romania and played in CFR Cluj in Liga I. In the summer of 2005, Brunčević helped CFR Cluj reach the 2005 UEFA Intertoto Cup final by playing 5 matches in the campaign. After two years in CFR Cluj he moved to Gloria Bistrița. At Gloria Bistrița he played one and a half years and after that he moved back to FK Novi Pazar play one and half year after which he finished his career. Immediately after retiring he was appointed as the new director of football of FK Novi Pazar.

== Honours ==
CFR Cluj

- UEFA Intertoto Cup runner-up: 2005
