= Maciej Scherfchen =

Polish footballer

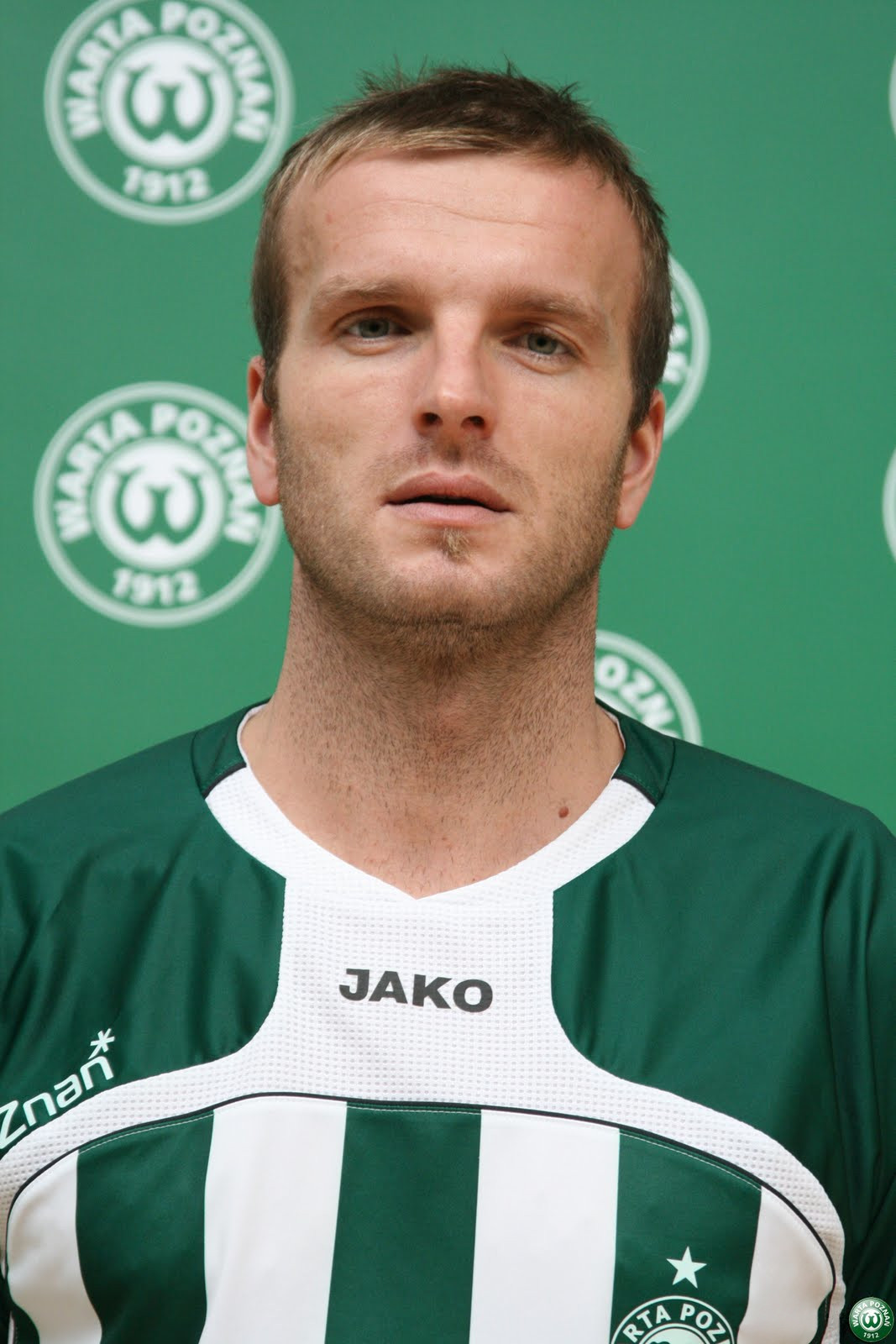

Personal information
- Full name: Maciej Scherfchen
- Date of birth: 24 February 1979 (age 47)
- Place of birth: Szamotuły, Poland
- Height: 1.86 m (6 ft 1 in)
- Position: Midfielder

Senior career*
Years	Team	Apps	(Gls)
1995–1997	Sokół Pniewy		
1998–2000	Lech Poznań	60	(1)
2000–2002	Polonia Warsaw	42	(1)
2003	Widzew Łódź	9	(0)
2003–2008	Lech Poznań	81	(4)
2008–2010	Ruch Chorzów	28	(0)
2009	→ Arka Gdynia (loan)	8	(0)
2010	AEP Paphos	1	(0)
2011–2012	Warta Poznań	21	(0)
2012	Olimpia Elbląg	24	(0)
2013	Nielba Wągrowiec	13	(0)
2013–2014	Warta Poznań	23	(1)
2014–2015	Tarnovia Tarnowo Podgórne	23	(0)
2015–2016	LKS Ślesin		
2016–2021	Lipno Stęszew		

International career
2004–2006	Poland	2	(0)
- * Club domestic league appearances and goals

Maciej Scherfchen (born 24 February 1979) is a Polish former professional footballer who played as a midfielder.

== Career ==
=== Club ===
In January 2011, he joined Warta Poznań.

=== International career ===
Scherfchen has made two appearances for the Poland national team.

== Honours ==
Polonia Warsaw

- Polish Cup: 2000–01

Lech Poznań

- Polish Cup: 2003–04
- Polish Super Cup: 2004
