= Cristian Florin Dan =

Romanian former footballer

Florin Dan
Personal information
- Full name: Florin Cristian Dan
- Date of birth: 1 April 1979 (age 47)
- Place of birth: Târgu-Mureș, Romania
- Height: 1.76 m (5 ft 9 1/2 in)
- Position: Midfielder

Senior career*
Years	Team	Apps	(Gls)
1997–2000	Gloria Bistrița	10	(0)
2000–2001	Olimpia Satu Mare	3	(0)
2000–2001	Corvinul Hunedoara	15	(0)
2001	Olimpia Satu Mare	0	(0)
2002	Politehnica Unirea Iași		
2002–2006	CFR Cluj	103	(15)
2007	Unirea Dej	4	(1)
2007–2009	UTA Arad	31	(4)
2009–2010	Unirea Alba Iulia	43	(10)
2010–2012	FCM Târgu Mureș	57	(7)
2012–2014	Gaz Metan Mediaș	42	(3)
2015–2016	Sănătatea Cluj	22	(4)
Total		330	(44)
- * Club domestic league appearances and goals as of 1 May 2021

Florin Cristian Dan (born 1 April 1979 in Târgu-Mureș) is a Romanian former footballer who played as a midfielder. Florin Dan played 7 games and scored two goals in CFR Cluj's 2005 Intertoto Cup campaign in which the club reached the final.

== Honours ==
Politehnica Unirea Iași

- Divizia C: 2001–02

CFR Cluj

- Divizia B: 2003–04
- UEFA Intertoto Cup runner-up: 2005

Unirea Alba Iulia

- Divizia B: 2008–09
