= Tomasz Parzy =

Polish footballer

Personal information
- Full name: Tomasz Parzy
- Date of birth: 17 December 1979 (age 46)
- Place of birth: Leszno, Poland
- Height: 1.81 m (5 ft 11 1/2 in)
- Position: Midfielder

Youth career
- Kłos Garzyn
- Polonia 1912 Leszno

Senior career*
Years	Team	Apps	(Gls)
1994–1996	Kania Gostyń		
1997–2002	Warta Poznań		
1999	→ Obra Kościan (loan)		
2000	→ Zawisza Bydgoszcz (loan)		
2003	Ceramika Opoczno	14	(1)
2003–2006	Pogoń Szczecin	51	(9)
2006	→ Arka Gdynia (loan)	13	(1)
2006–2007	Wisła Płock	6	(0)
2007–2010	Pogoń Szczecin	57+	(7+)
2011–2012	Chojniczanka Chojnice	41	(4)
2012–2013	Kotwica Kołobrzeg	26	(4)
2013–2015	1. FC Neubrandenburg 04	15	(1)
2015–2017	Penzliner SV		
2019–2020	LSV Zichow		
- * Club domestic league appearances and goals

Tomasz Parzy (born 17 December 1979) is a Polish former professional footballer who played as a midfielder.

== Career ==
In January 2011, he joined Chojniczanka Chojnice on a half year contract.

== Honours ==
Pogoń Szczecin

- II liga: 2003–04
- IV liga West Pomeranian: 2007–08

== See also ==
- Football in Poland
- List of football clubs in Poland
