= Adrian Anca =

Romanian footballer (born 1976)

Personal information
- Full name: Adrian Gheorghe Anca
- Date of birth: 27 March 1976 (age 50)
- Place of birth: Diosig, Romania
- Height: 1.79 m (5 ft 10 in)
- Position: Striker

Team information
- Current team: Bihor Oradea (scouting director)

Senior career*
Years	Team	Apps	(Gls)
1996–2001	Crișul Aleșd		
2001–2002	Industria Sârmei Câmpia Turzii	44	(18)
2003	Gloria Bistrița	9	(1)
2003–2008	CFR Cluj	118	(47)
2008	Oțelul Galați	4	(0)
2008–2009	Gloria Bistrița	11	(1)
2010	Luceafărul Oradea		
Total		186	(68)

Managerial career
- 2010: Luceafărul Oradea (player/assistant)
- 2010: Luceafărul Oradea (caretaker)
- 2010: Silvania Șimleu Silvaniei
- 2011: Bihorul Beiuș
- 2021–2022: Bihorul Beiuș
- 2025–2026: Bihorul Beiuș (general manager)
- 2026–: Bihor Oradea (scouting director)
- * Club domestic league appearances and goals

Adrian Gheorghe Anca (born 27 March 1976) is a Romanian former professional footballer who played as a striker, currently scouting director at Liga II club Bihor Oradea.

== Playing career ==
Anca, nicknamed Caniggia, was born on 27 March 1976 in Diosig, Romania and began playing football in 1998 at Divizia C club Crișul Aleșd. In 2001 he went to play at Divizia B level, signing with IS Campia Turzii. In 2003 he joined Gloria Bistrița where on 8 March under coach Remus Vlad, he made his Divizia A debut in a 1–1 draw against Sportul Studențesc București. He scored his first goal on 18 March in Gloria's 3–1 home loss to Farul Constanța. In the 2003 Intertoto Cup, Anca scored in a victory against Bangor City which helped them get past the first round, being eliminated in the following one by Brescia.

In the 2003–04 season, he returned to Divizia B, joining CFR Cluj where he would score 24 goals to help the team earn promotion to the first division, making a partnership in the offence with Cosmin Tilincă. In the following season, Anca scored 11 goals to help his side avoid relegation, starting with the opening goal in a 1–1 draw against Rapid București, also scoring two doubles in two 4–2 wins over Apulum Alba Iulia and Dinamo București. Under coach Dorinel Munteanu, he played ten games in the 2005 Intertoto Cup campaign as CFR got past Vėtra, Athletic Bilbao, Saint-Étienne and Žalgiris, scoring four goals —two against each of the Lithuanian teams— with the team reaching the final where they were defeated 4–2 on aggregate by Lens. In the 2007–08 season, Anca helped CFR win for the first time in the club's history the championship and the cup, being used in five league matches by coach Ioan Andone.

In the summer of 2008, he joined Oțelul Galați, but after only two months he cancelled his contract and signed with Gloria Bistrița to be closer to his wife who was about to give birth. With Gloria he made his last Divizia A appearance on 15 August 2009 in a 0–0 draw against Astra Ploiești, totaling 113 matches with 25 goals in the competition and 13 games with six goals in the Intertoto Cup.

== Managerial career ==
In February 2010 he signed with Luceafărul Oradea, a third division club. He was an assistant coach besides him playing for the club. In April 2010 he became head coach at Luceafărul, after Alexandru Kiss resigned. In June 2010 he was appointed head coach of Silvania Șimleu Silvaniei, but in October of the same year his contract was terminated. In 2011, Anca was for 11 months coach of Bihorul Beiuș in the third league.

== Honours ==
=== Player ===
Crișul Aleșd

- Divizia D – Bihor County: 1996–97

=== Player ===
CFR Cluj

- Liga I: 2007–08
- Cupa României: 2007–08
- Divizia B: 2003–04
- UEFA Intertoto Cup runner-up: 2005

=== Individual ===
- Divizia B top scorer: 2003–04 (Series III - 24 goals)
