= Krzysztof Gajtkowski =

Polish footballer (born 1980)

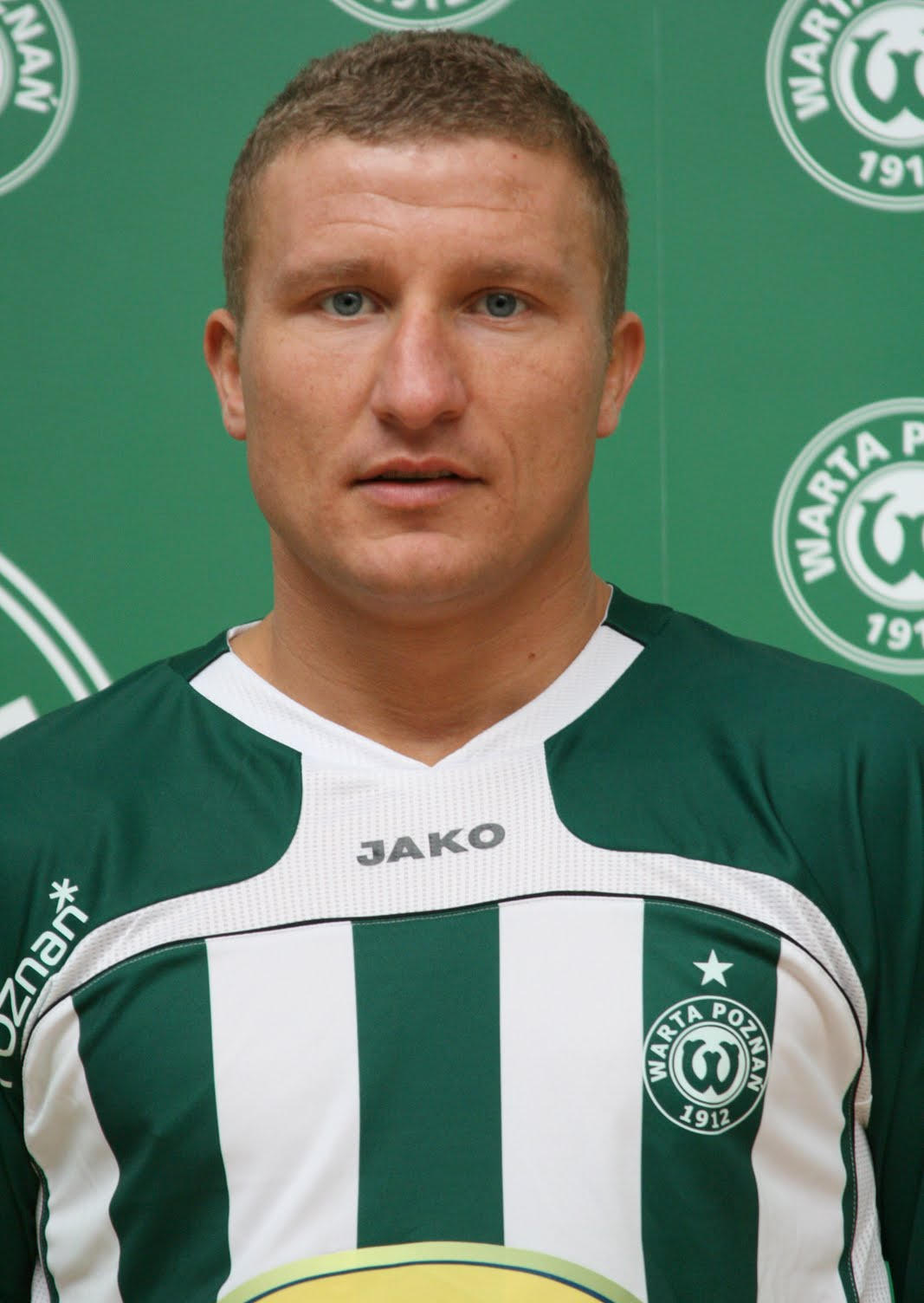

Personal information
- Date of birth: 26 September 1980 (age 46)
- Place of birth: Bytom, Poland
- Height: 1.76 m (5 ft 9 1/2 in)
- Position: Striker

Senior career*
Years	Team	Apps	(Gls)
1998–1999	Szombierki Bytom		
1999–2002	GKS Katowice	49	(12)
2003–2005	Lech Poznań	64	(18)
2003–2004	→ GKS Katowice (loan)	22	(4)
2006–2010	Korona Kielce	57	(12)
2008–2009	→ Polonia Warsaw (loan)	19	(2)
2011	Warta Poznań	31	(8)
2012	Kolejarz Stróże	26	(3)
2013	Bytovia Bytów	9	(1)
2013	Szombierki Bytom	4	(0)
2014	MKS Sławków		
- * Club domestic league appearances and goals

Krzysztof Gajtkowski (born 26 September 1980) is a Polish former professional footballer who played as a striker.

== Career ==
=== Club ===
In January 2011, he joined Warta Poznań.

He missed the first half of the 2006–07 season battling a serious injury.

== Honours ==
Lech Poznań

- Polish Cup: 2003–04
