= Marek Kowal =

Polish footballer

Personal information
- Full name: Marek Kowal
- Date of birth: 24 January 1985 (age 41)
- Place of birth: Szczecin, Poland
- Height: 1.82 m (5 ft 11 1/2 in)
- Position: Striker

Senior career*
Years	Team	Apps	(Gls)
2004	Pogoń Szczecin Nowa		
2004	Pogoń Szczecin II		
2005–2009	Pogoń Szczecin		
2005–2006	→ Śląsk Wrocław (loan)	45	(8)
2010	Flota Świnoujście	16	(0)
2011	Chojniczanka Chojnice	10	(2)
2011–2012	Bytovia Bytów	4	(0)
2012–2013	Kotwica Kołobrzeg	28	(7)
2016–2017	Sarmata Dobra		
- * Club domestic league appearances and goals

Marek Kowal (born 24 January 1985) is a Polish former professional footballer who played as a striker.

== Honours ==
Pogoń Szczecin

- IV liga West Pomerania: 2007–08
