= Cătălin Bucur =

Romanian footballer (born 1983)

Personal information
- Full name: Cătălin Valentin Bucur
- Date of birth: 25 March 1983 (age 43)
- Place of birth: Bistrița, Romania
- Height: 1.80 m (5 ft 11 in)
- Position: Forward

Youth career
- Gloria Bistrița

Senior career*
Years	Team	Apps	(Gls)
2004–2008	Gloria Bistrița	6	(0)
2005–2006	→ Gloria II Bistrița	?	(?)
2006–2007	→ IS Câmpia Turzii (loan)	?	(?)
2008–2009	Bihor Oradea	35	(15)
2010	Concordia Chiajna	0	(0)
2010–2011	Arieșul Turda	37	(12)
2012	UTA Arad	21	(4)
2013–2014	Gloria Bistrița	11	(1)
2015	SC 04 Tuttlingen	3	(0)
2015	Voința Cetate	?	(?)
2015–2016	FC Bistrița	?	(?)
2016–2017	ACS Dumitra	?	(?)
Total		113+	(32+)
- * Club domestic league appearances and goals as of 21 March 2018

Cătălin Valentin Bucur (born 25 March 1983) is a Romanian former football forward. Bucur is the product of Gloria Bistrița football academy. His best period as a player was between 2008 and 2011 when he scored 27 goals for Bihor Oradea and Arieșul Turda in Liga II.
