= Gedas Butrimavičius =

Lithuanian footballer

Personal information
- Full name: Gedas Butrimavičius
- Date of birth: 26 January 1980 (age 46)
- Place of birth: Trakai, Lithuania
- Height: 1.82 m (5 ft 11 1/2 in)
- Position: Defender

Senior career*
Years	Team	Apps	(Gls)
2000	Polonija Vilnius	26	(0)
2002–2008	Vėtra Vilnius	136	(18)
2009	Atlantis FC	23	(2)

International career^{‡}
2003–2004	Lithuania	2	(1)
- * Club domestic league appearances and goals as of 14 July 2009 ‡ National team caps and goals as of 6 July 2009

Gedas Butrimavičius (born 26 January 1980) was a Lithuanian football defender.

== Career ==
Butrimavičius started his career with Polonija Vilnius.

== International career ==
He has two caps in the Lithuania national football team and has scored once.
