= Mirsad Brunčević =

Serbian footballer

Personal information
- Full name: Mirsad Brunčević
- Date of birth: 11 June 1994 (age 32)
- Place of birth: Novi Pazar, FR Yugoslavia
- Height: 1.85 m (6 ft 1 in)
- Position: Centre back

Youth career
- Novi Pazar
- Partizan

Senior career*
Years	Team	Apps	(Gls)
2012–2015	Hellas Verona	0	(0)
2012–2013	→ Proleter Novi Sad (loan)	0	(0)
2014–2015	→ Udinese (loan)	0	(0)
2015–2019	Novi Pazar	39	(0)
2019	FK Tutin	0	(0)
2020	Trepča		
2021-2022	Tutin		

International career^{‡}
	Serbia U17	1	(0)
	Serbia U18	9	(2)
	Serbia U19	15	(3)
- * Club domestic league appearances and goals as of 20 December 2018 ‡ National team caps and goals as of 9 May 2016

Mirsad Brunčević (Serbian Cyrillic: Мирсад Брунчевић; born 11 June 1994) is a Serbian football defender.

== Club career ==
After youth categories he passed with Novi Pazar and Partizan, Brunčević signed for Hellas Verona. Later, he had been loaned to Proleter Novi Sad for the 2012–13 season. He returned in Verona after that season, but after he missed some period because of injury, he was loaned to Udinese Calcio in 2014, for a year. Brunčević returned in his home club Novi Pazar for the 2015–16 season.

Brunčević joined FK Tutin in the summer 2019.

== Career statistics ==
=== Club ===
As of 31 May 2017

Club	Season	League			Cup		Continental		Other		Total	
Club	Season	Division	Apps	Goals	Apps	Goals	Apps	Goals	Apps	Goals	Apps	Goals
Novi Pazar	2015–16	SuperLiga	2	0	0	0	—		—		2	0
Novi Pazar	2016–17	SuperLiga	11	0	2	0	—		—		13	0
Novi Pazar	Total		13	0	2	0	—		—		15	0
