= Branislav Jašurek =

Slovak footballer

Personal information
- Date of birth: 1982 (age 43–44)
- Place of birth: Slovakia
- Positions: Midfielder; winger

Senior career*
| Years | Team | Apps | (Gls) |
| –2000 | MŠK Žilina | | |
| 2000–2001 | KFC Uerdingen 05 | | |
| 2000–2001 | VfB Oldenburg | | |
| 2001–2003 | FK REaMOS Kysucký Lieskovec | | |
| 2003–2004 | FK Ventspils | | |
- FK Žalgiris
| –2007 | Jakubčovice Fotbal | | |
| 2007 | AS Trenčín | | |
- * Club domestic league appearances and goals

Branislav Jašurek (born 1982) is a Slovak former professional footballer who played as a midfielder or winger.
