= Ionuț Mazilu =

Romanian footballer and manager

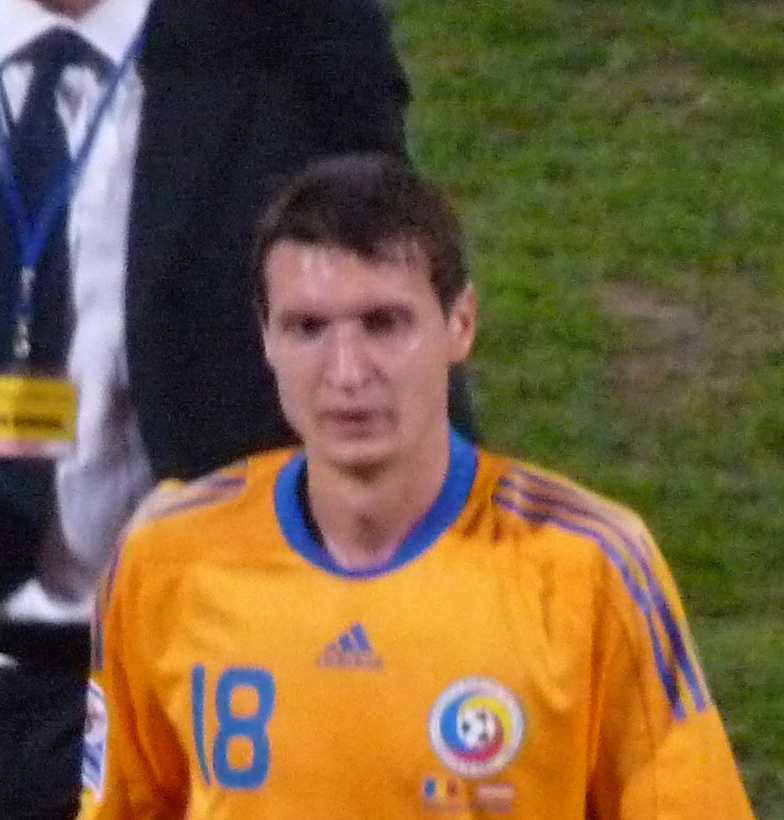

Personal information
- Full name: Ionuț Costinel Mazilu
- Date of birth: 9 February 1982 (age 44)
- Place of birth: Bucharest, Romania
- Height: 1.81 m (5 ft 11 in)
- Position: Forward

Youth career
- –1999: Sportul Studențesc

Senior career*
Years	Team	Apps	(Gls)
1999–2006	Sportul Studențesc	182	(80)
2006–2008	Rapid București	34	(18)
2008–2011	Dnipro Dnipropetrovsk	9	(1)
2009–2011	→ Arsenal Kyiv (loan)	62	(20)
2011–2013	Arsenal Kyiv	25	(6)
Total		312	(125)

International career
2000	Romania U19	1	(1)
2005–2011	Romania	17	(3)

Managerial career
- 2014–2017: Sportul Studențesc
- 2017–2018: Sport Team București U19
- 2018–2020: Rapid București U19
- 2020–2021: Rapid București U17
- 2023–2024: Romania U16 (assistant)
- 2024–2025: Romania U17 (assistant)
- 2025–2026: Gloria Bistrița (assistant)
- * Club domestic league appearances and goals

Ionuț Costinel Mazilu (born 9 February 1982) is a Romanian former professional footballer who played as a forward.

== Club career ==
=== Sportul Studențesc ===
Mazilu was born on 9 February 1982 in Bucharest, Romania. He began playing football for Sportul Studențesc during the 1999–2000 Divizia B season. He helped Sportul gain promotion to the first league by scoring 12 goals in the 2000–01 season. Subsequently, Mazilu made his Divizia A debut on 3 August 2001, when coach Ioan Andone sent him in the 66th minute and he scored a hat-trick for a 3–0 victory against Petrolul Ploiești. At the end of the 2002–03 season, the team suffered relegation. However, he stayed with the club, forming a prolific offensive partnership with Gheorghe Bucur, with Mazilu scoring 20 goals in the 2003–04 season to help Sportul gain promotion back to the first league. In the 2005–06 season, he scored 22 goals, including two hat-tricks in victories against Farul Constanța and Dinamo București, and became the Divizia A top-scorer.

=== Rapid București ===
In 2006, Mazilu went from Sportul Studențesc to Rapid București for a €1.5 million transfer fee. On 5 November 2006, he scored his first goals for Rapid by netting a brace in a 7–0 victory against Oțelul Galați. Two weeks later, he scored another double in a 3–0 win over Ceahlăul Piatra Neamț. He made his debut in European competitions by playing in two draws against Hapoel Tel Aviv and Mladá Boleslav in the 2006–07 UEFA Cup group stage. The team reached the 2007 Cupa României final, where Mazilu played as a starter before coach Răzvan Lucescu substituted him in the 82nd minute with Viorel Moldovan in the 2–0 victory over Politehnica Timișoara. Subsequently, he played the entire match under coach Cristiano Bergodi in Rapid's victory at the penalty shoot-out against Dinamo București in the 2007 Supercupa României. Mazilu also played in both legs of the 2007–08 UEFA Cup first round, where they were eliminated on the away goals rule after 2–2 on aggregate by 1. FC Nürnberg. He made his last Liga I appearance on 9 December 2007 in a 2–0 victory over Dacia Mioveni, totaling 141 matches with 60 goals in the competition.

=== Dnipro Dnipropetrovsk ===
In January 2008, Mazilu joined Dnipro Dnipropetrovsk which paid Rapid a €3.7 million transfer fee. He made his Vyshcha Liha debut on 9 March under coach Oleh Protasov in a 1–1 draw against Naftovyk Okhtyrka. He scored his first goal in the competition on 4 May in a 1–0 away win over Tavriya Simferopol.

=== Arsenal Kyiv ===
In January 2009, Mazilu was close to a move to CFR Cluj, but was eventually sent on loan by Dnipro to Arsenal Kyiv. In his first league match for his new team, he scored the only goal in the 1–0 victory against FC Kharkiv. He also scored in the following two matches, a 1–0 win over Zorya Luhansk and a 1–1 draw against Tavriya Simferopol. In the 2009–10 season, Mazilu scored nine league goals, which included one goal in a 1–1 draw against the team he belonged to, Dnipro, and two doubles in wins over Vorskla Poltava and Illichivets Mariupol. In the following season, he netted seven league goals, including a brace in a 3–1 home win over Illichivets Mariupol. After his loan spell from Dnipro concluded, Mazilu joined Arsenal Kyiv on a permanent transfer. He opened the 2012–13 season by scoring twice in a 3–3 draw against Dnipro. Mazilu later equalized in the final minutes to secure a 1–1 draw with Shakhtar Donetsk, before he capped off the campaign by netting another brace in a 3–0 success over Karpaty Lviv. In the first leg of the third qualifying round of the 2012–13 Europa League, he opened the scoring for Arsenal Kyiv in a 3–0 victory against ND Mura 05; however, the match was later declared a 3–0 forfeit loss against Arsenal due to the club fielding an ineligible player. Mazilu also featured in the second-leg 2–0 win, which ultimately proved insufficient for the squad to progress. He made his last appearance in the Ukrainian league on 2 March 2013 in a 3–0 away loss to Dnipro, having accumulated a total of 96 matches with 27 goals in the competition. During his time at Arsenal Kyiv, Mazilu was teammates for several years with compatriots Florin Șoavă and George Florescu.

== International career ==
Mazilu played 17 matches and scored three goals for Romania, making his debut on 9 February 2005, when coach Victor Pițurcă sent him in the 83rd minute to replace Dorinel Munteanu in a 3–0 win against Armenia in the 2006 World Cup qualifiers. In those qualifiers, he appeared in two more victories against Czech Republic and Finland. He scored his first goal on 1 March 2006 in a 2–0 friendly victory over Slovenia. In the following years, Mazilu played two games in each of the Euro 2008 and 2010 World Cup qualifiers, scoring a goal in a 3–1 triumph over the Faroe Islands in the latter campaign. His last appearance for the national team took place on 15 November 2011 in a 3–1 friendly victory against Greece.

== Managerial career ==
Between 2014 and 2017, Mazilu was head coach at Sportul Studențesc in Liga IV. Afterwards, he worked from 2017 to 2021 as a junior coach for Rapid București. He served as an assistant coach to Nicolae Grigore for Romania's under-16 and under-17 national teams, a role he continued in September 2025 when the pair was appointed to manage Liga II club Gloria Bistrița.

== Career statistics ==
Appearances and goals by national team and year
National team	Year	Apps	Goals
Romania	2005	5	0
Romania	2006	3	1
Romania	2007	3	1
Romania	2008	0	0
Romania	2009	2	1
Romania	2010	2	0
Romania	2011	2	0
Total		17	3

Scores and results list Romania's goal tally first, score column indicates score after each Mazilu goal.

List of international goals scored by Ionuț Mazilu
#	Date	Venue	Opponent	Score	Result	Competition
1	28 February 2006	GSZ Stadium, Nicosia, Cyprus	Slovenia	1–0	2–0	Friendly
2	7 February 2007	Stadionul Lia Manoliu, Bucharest, Romania	Moldova	1–0	2–0	Friendly
3	7 February 2007	Stadionul Ceahlăul, Piatra Neamț, Romania	Faroe Islands	3–1	3–1	2010 FIFA World Cup Qualifying

== Honours ==
Sportul Studențesc

- Divizia B: 2000–01, 2003–04

Rapid București

- Cupa României: 2006–07
- Supercupa României: 2007

Individual

- Divizia A top scorer: 2005–06 (22 goals)
