= Mirko Plantić =

Croatian footballer

Personal information
- Date of birth: 15 January 1985 (age 41)
- Place of birth: Zagreb, SFR Yugoslavia
- Height: 1.81 m (5 ft 11 in)
- Position: Defender

Team information
- Current team: SpVgg Ludwigsburg

Youth career
- Dinamo Zagreb
- 2002–2004: Varteks

Senior career*
| Years | Team | Apps | (Gls) |
| 2002–2007 | Varteks | 30 | (1) |
| 2007 | Chornomorets Odesa | | |
| 2007–2008 | Croatia Sesvete | 2 | (0) |
| 2008 | Križevci | | |
| 2008–2009 | DAC Dunajská Streda | 5 | (0) |
| 2009 | Vllaznia Shkodër | 8 | (0) |
| 2009–2010 | Međimurje | 16 | (1) |
| 2010 | Croatia Sesvete | 11 | (1) |
| 2011 | Istra 1961 | 2 | (1) |
| 2012 | Varaždin | 3 | (0) |
| 2012 | SV Sierning | 5 | (1) |
| 2013–2014 | FC Affoltern am Albis | | |
| 2014–2015 | NK Mladost Marija Bistrica | | |
| 2015 | NK Croatia-Zagreb Stuttgart | | |
| 2016 | SpVgg Ludwigsburg | | |

International career^{‡}
| 2003 | Croatia U18 | 7 | (2) |
| 2003–2004 | Croatia U19 | 15 | (4) |
| 2005 | Croatia U21 | 1 | (0) |
- * Club domestic league appearances and goals as of 19 November 2022 ‡ National team caps and goals as of 22:58, 24 October 2009 (UTC)

Mirko Plantić (born 15 January 1985) is a Croatian footballer.

== Career ==
He had a spell with Austrian 4th tier side SV Sierning in 2012.
