= Marcin Wachowicz =

Polish footballer

Personal information
- Date of birth: 14 February 1981 (age 45)
- Place of birth: Choszczno, Poland
- Height: 1.81 m (5 ft 11 1/2 in)
- Position: Forward

Team information
- Current team: Korona Raduń
- Number: 17

Senior career*
Years	Team	Apps	(Gls)
1998–1999	Piast Choszczno		
1999	Polonia Warsaw	1	(0)
2000	Mazowsze Grójec		
2000	Czarni Żagań		
2001	Dolcan Ząbki	12	(0)
2001–2002	Hutnik Warsaw		
2002–2003	Ceramika Opoczno	19	(1)
2003–2004	ŁKS Łódź	41	(11)
2005–2006	Lech Poznań	41	(4)
2007–2010	Arka Gdynia	88	(32)
2010	Ruch Radzionków	7	(2)
2012	Orkan Rumia	1	(0)
2012	Kotwica Kołobrzeg	10	(0)
2013–2015	SV Peheim	18	(5)
2016–2018	Gavia Choszczno		
2019–	Korona Raduń	67	(40)
- * Club domestic league appearances and goals as of 21 December 2024

Marcin Wachowicz (born 14 February 1981) is a Polish footballer who plays as a forward for Korona Raduń.

== Career ==
In October 2010, he moved to Ruch Radzionków from Arka Gdynia. He was released in January 2011.

== Honours ==
Individual

- Ekstraklasa Cup top scorer: 2008–09
