= Radislav Sekulić =

Montenegrin footballer

Personal information
- Full name: Radislav Sekulić
- Date of birth: 27 September 1985 (age 41)
- Place of birth: Titograd, SFR Yugoslavia
- Height: 5 ft 10 in (1.78 m)
- Position: Striker

Youth career
- 1997–2002: Budućnost Podgorica

Senior career*
Years	Team	Apps	(Gls)
2002–2009	Budućnost Podgorica	51	(14)
2009	Mogren	10	(1)
2010	Shanghai Zobon	8	(0)
2011	Mladost Podgorica	9	(3)
2011–2012	Budapest Honvéd	6	(0)
2011–2012	Budapest Honvéd II	3	(0)
2012–2013	Bežanija	20	(7)
2013–2014	Čukarički	16	(1)
2015	Sinđelić Beograd	15	(1)
2016	Zeta	5	(0)
2017	Lovćen	8	(0)
- * Club domestic league appearances and goals

Radislav Sekulić (Serbian Cyrillic: Радислав Секулић, born 27 September 1985) is a Montenegrin retired football striker.

== Club career ==
Born in Titograd, SR Montenegro, he started playing with FK Budućnost Podgorica youth team and made the debut for the main team in the 2002–03 season of the Second League of FR Yugoslavia. He played with Budućnost all the way until summer 2009 when he moved to another Montenegrin First League side, FK Mogren. During the winter break of the 2009–10 season he moved abroad by joining Shanghai Zobon and playing with them in the 2010 China League One. At the end of the season Pudong was relegated and Sekulić returned to Montenegro and played the second half of the 2010–11 season with FK Mladost Podgorica. In the following summer he moved abroad again, this time to play with Budapest Honvéd FC in the 2011–12 Hungarian Championship. After one season in Hungary, in summer 2012, he moved to Serbia and joined FK Bežanija. After playing one season in the Serbian First League where he scored 7 goals on 20 appearances, he moved to a Serbian SuperLiga side FK Čukarički in summer 2013.

== Honours ==
Budućnost Podgorica

- Montenegrin First League: 2007–08
