= Bogdan Pereș =

Romanian footballer

Bogdan Pereş
Personal information
- Full name: Bogdan Ionuţ Pereş
- Date of birth: 4 July 1983 (age 43)
- Place of birth: Baia Mare, Romania
- Height: 1.87 m (6 ft 1 1/2 in)
- Position: Striker

Youth career
- Baia Mare

Senior career*
Years	Team	Apps	(Gls)
1998–2003	Baia Mare	45	(16)
2003–2005	Gloria Bistriţa	32	(3)
2005–2006	Braşov	18	(2)
2006–2007	Baia Mare	12	(1)
2007–2009	Arieşul Turda	45	(4)
2009–2010	Baia Mare	14	(2)
Total		166	(28)
- * Club domestic league appearances and goals as of 27 February 2018

Bogdan Ionuţ Pereş (born 4 July 1983) is a former football player who last time played for FC Baia Mare as a striker.

He played as a youngster at FC Baia Mare, where he made his debut in the Romanian Liga II in 1998. He played for FC Baia Mare between 1998 and 2004, then he moved in 2004 at Gloria Bistriţa, where he played two years. He moved to FC Brașov and after some time he returned at FC Baia Mare. After a short spell at FC Baia Mare, he played first-team football at Arieşul Turda in Liga II. He returned at FC Baia Mare in the summer of 2009, where he played for one more season before retiring from professional football
