= Karolis Jasaitis =

Lithuanian footballer

Personal information
- Date of birth: 1 November 1982 (age 43)
- Place of birth: Vilnius, Lithuanian SSR
- Height: 1.92 m (6 ft 4 in)
- Position: Midfielder

Youth career
- –1999: FK Žalgiris

Senior career*
Years	Team	Apps	(Gls)
2000	Polonija Vilnius	26	(1)
2001–2005	FK Žalgiris	77	(9)
2006–2008	FK Suduva	54	(6)
2009–2010	FK Tauras Tauragė	28	(4)
2011	FC Nizhny Novgorod	0	(0)
2012	REO Vilnius		
2012–2017	Frøya FK		

International career^{‡}
2002	Lithuania	1	(0)
- * Club domestic league appearances and goals as of 14:25, 31 May 2012 (UTC) ‡ National team caps and goals as of 7 April 2004

Karolis Jasaitis (born 1 November 1982) is a former Lithuanian football player.

== International career ==
In 2006, he made a brief appearance for the Lithuanian national team in a friendly against Andorra, but was injured after just 2 minutes. The broken leg he sustained had kept him out of action for 6 months.
