= Liberty Center (disambiguation) =

Liberty Center can refer to:

- Liberty Center, Indiana
- Liberty Center, Iowa
- Liberty Center, Ohio
- Liberty Center (mall), a shopping center in Liberty Township, Butler County, Ohio
- Liberty Center (Bucharest), a shopping mall in Bucharest, Romania
- Liberty Center, a two building complex in Pittsburgh, Pennsylvania which includes the Westin Convention Center Pittsburgh hotel and the Federated Tower
