= Orban =

Orban or Orbán may refer to:

== People ==
- Orban (name), a surname and given name
- Orbán (ironmaster) (died 1453), cannon founder and engineer from the Kingdom of Hungary
- Ludovic Orban (born 1963), former Prime Minister of Romania 2019-2020
- Viktor Orbán (born 1963), former Prime Minister of Hungary 1998–2002; 2010–2026

== Other ==
- Orban (audio processing), an international company making audio processors for Radio, TV and Internet broadcasters
- Orban, Tarn, a commune in France
- Pârâul lui Orban, tributary of the Romanian river Pădureni
