= Gruia =

Gruia may refer to several places in Romania:

- Gruia, Cluj-Napoca, a district of Cluj-Napoca
- Gruia, Mehedinți, a commune in Mehedinți County
