= Grigorescu, Cluj-Napoca =

Grigorescu Donátnegyed (Hungarian)
- District of Cluj-Napoca
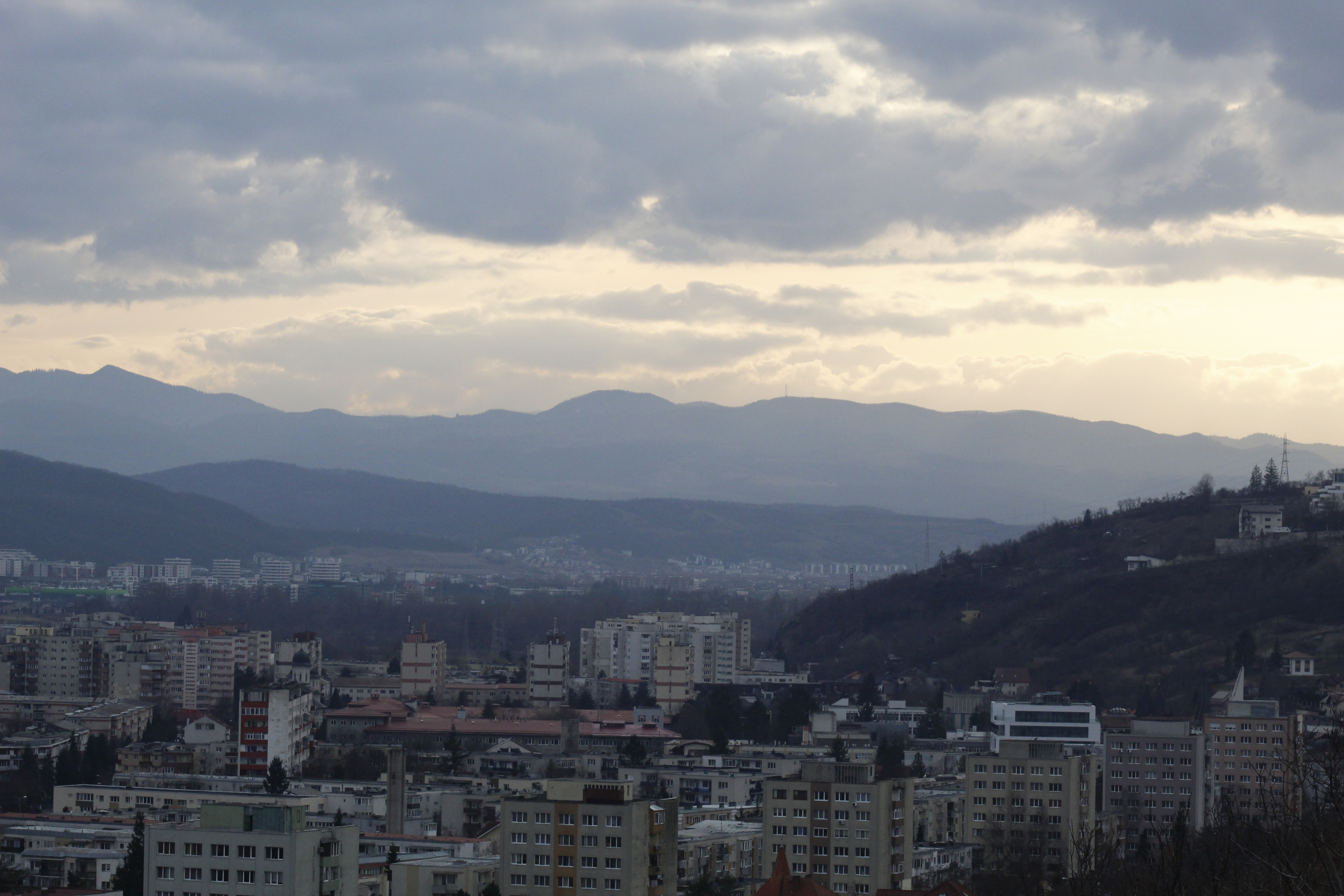
- A view of the District from Cetățuia with a backdrop of the Munții Gilăului
- Interactive map of Grigorescu
- Country: Romania
- County: Cluj
- City: Cluj-Napoca

Grigorescu (formerly known as: Cartierul Donath; Hungarian: Donátnegyed; or colloquially: Grigó) is a district located in the north-west of Cluj-Napoca in Romania. It is named after the Romanian general Eremia Grigorescu.

== Geography ==
Grigorescu lies west of Cluj-Napoca’s historic center, on the broad, largely flat river terrace along the Someșul Mic, framed by the slopes of Cetățuie Hill and the Hoia hills. Its western edge gradually transitions from the crowded urban grid into the greener, rising terrain that leads toward the Hoia Forest.

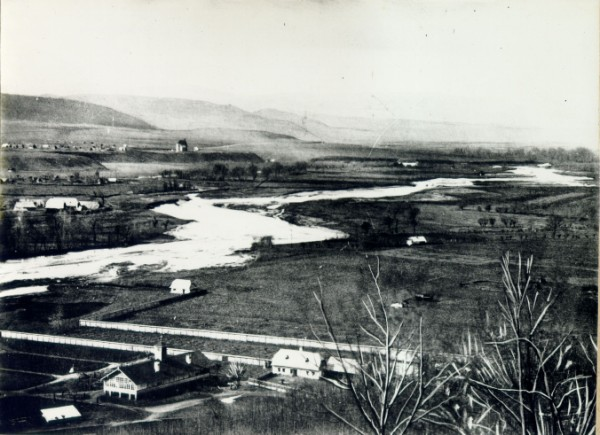
View from Cetățuie Hill as photographed by Ferenc Veress in 1859, showing the flat river terrace that today is home to the district.

== History ==
Before urban development, the prominent south-facing slope above the river terrace on which the neighbourhood sits once supported extensive vineyards.. In the early 18th century, a Baroque statue of Saint Donatus was erected on a prominent point of the vine-covered Hoia ridge; later Donát út (today: Strada Donat) and eventually the wider Donát quarter took their name from it. This association also reflects Saint Donatus's role in Catholic tradition as a protector of vineyards and winegrowers.

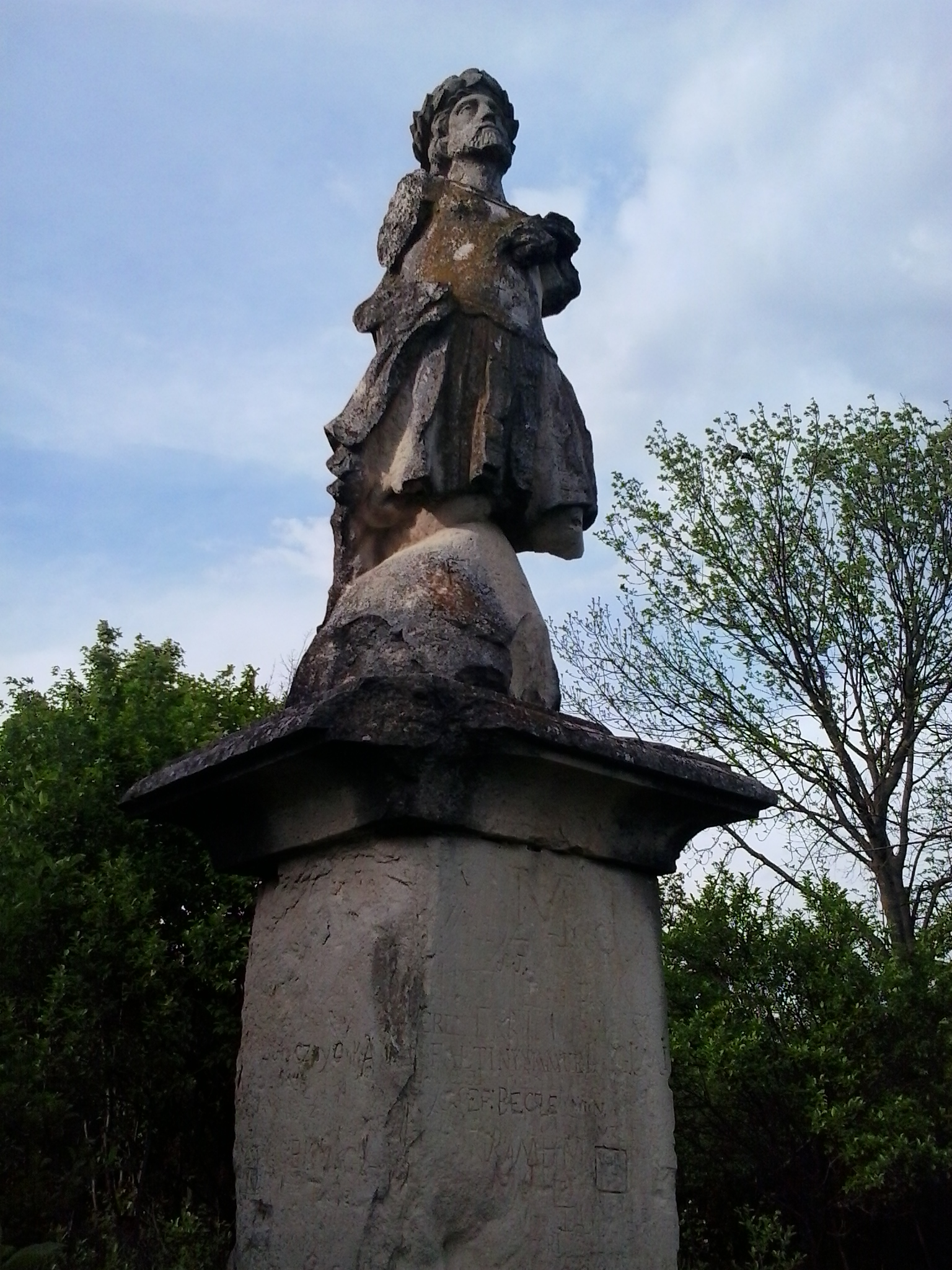
The statue of Saint Donatus

The hill marking the edge of the river terrace was traditionally known in Hungarian as Borjúmál (from borjú and mál). In the late 19th century, the more formal name Rákóczi-hegy (after Francis II Rákóczi) came into wider use, and from the 1880s onward vineyards and orchards were increasingly transformed into a holiday-home area. An 1894 guide of Kolozsvár already described Rákóczi-hegy as a rapidly developing holiday-home area with an almost continuous line of villas along the ridge.

As the district fromalized, the main road leading towards the west, parallel to the river inherited the name of the hill and became known as Rákoczi út. In 1903, the Cluj city assembly approved the acquisition of a large property on Rákóczi út (12,250 m²) for the state children's asylum. It was built promptly and by July 1904, it was nearing completion.

By this time, the area closer to the center of town had developed into a relatively affluent quarter, inhabited in large part by members of the intelligentsia and the civil-service class, in a social profile comparable to Tisztviselőtelep.

During 1905, the land of the old brickworks was being subdivided into smaller parcels and advertised for sale as inexpensive house lots, thus began the gradual conversion of the area toward residential development, including more modest housing.

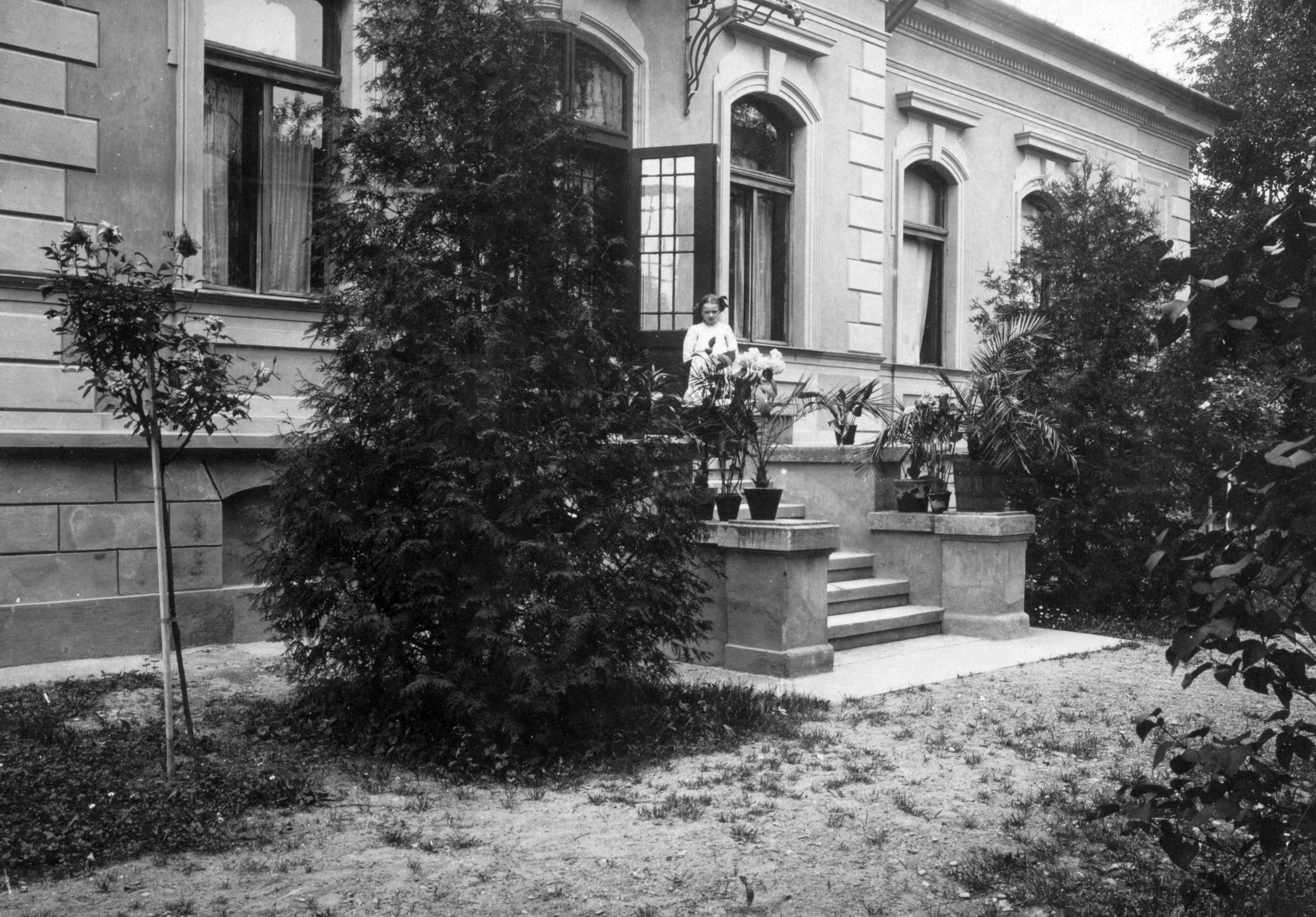
1916 Rákóczi út No. 1, the villa of Cholnoky Jenő.The site is today occupied by the Grand Hotel Napoca.

It was also during these years that areas further from the town centre began to be built up; by 1906, the outer stretch of the main road was started to be referred to as Donáth-út, even though the area was still described as a kind of no man’s land in the contemporary press.

After World War I and the Union of Transylvania with Romania, the city adopted new Romanian street names. By December 1921, the former Rákóczi út was already in use as Strada Gen. E. Grigorescu, while Donáth út would retain its original name. In interwar usage, what is today treated as a single district was still commonly understood as two distinct areas aligned with two successive main roads, thus the more central part came to be known as Cartierul Grigorescu, while the area further from town was named Cartierul Donath.

During the 1920s and 1930s, it was especially the Donath area that expanded through new construction. The town hall allocated plots of land there to newly arrived Romanian civil servants and members of the intelligentsia; however, a significant share of these parcels later changed hands through resale, contributing to a socially mixed resident population.

Two major institutional building projects were begun in the 1930s along the main roads of what is today Grigorescu: a large planned institute of balneology and physiotherapy on Strada Grigorescu near the inner, city-facing entrance to the area, and a cancer research institute building at the end of Strada Donath. After the Second Vienna Award, both projects were expected to be continued by the new Hungarian administration.A 1949 retrospective noted that the cancer institute structure had remained only partly built and that the balneological institute at the start of Rákóczi street still stood abandoned. The building of the cancer research institute would be completed and used for its original purpose until the very early 1950s when it was taken over by the Cluj branch of the Academy of Sciences. Scientific work in this building included atomic research and the study of radioactive isotopes.

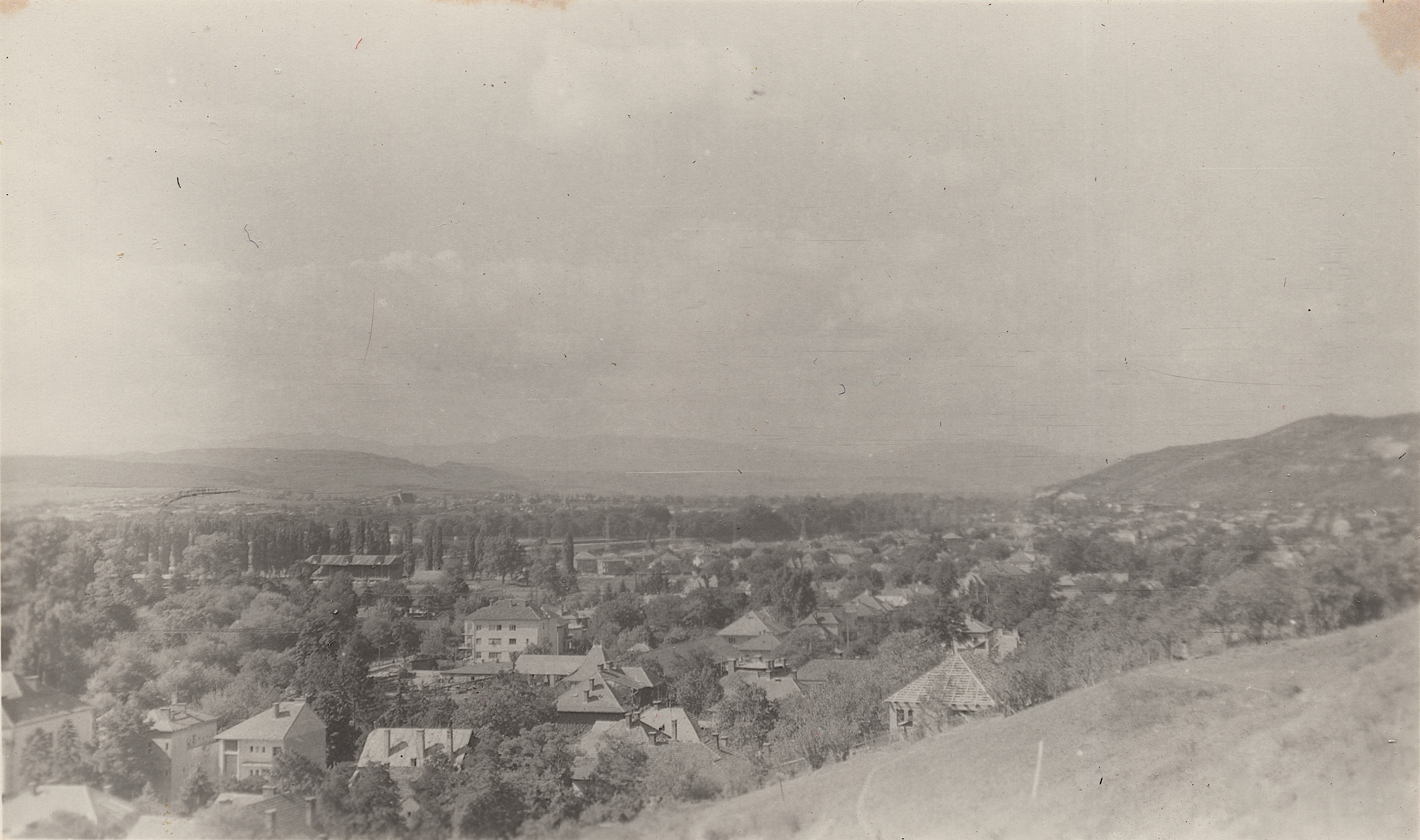
Cartierul Donath in the 1950s, still largely a residential area of detached homes.

In the late period of the Romanian People’s Republic, the first large apartment-block neighbourhood in Cluj began to take shape in Grigorescu. The first phase of construction was completed between 1961-1965, and included generours green areas, a shopping complex, a school and a kindergarten. In 1967, the end of Strada Donath also saw the opening of a new headquarters for Radio Cluj.

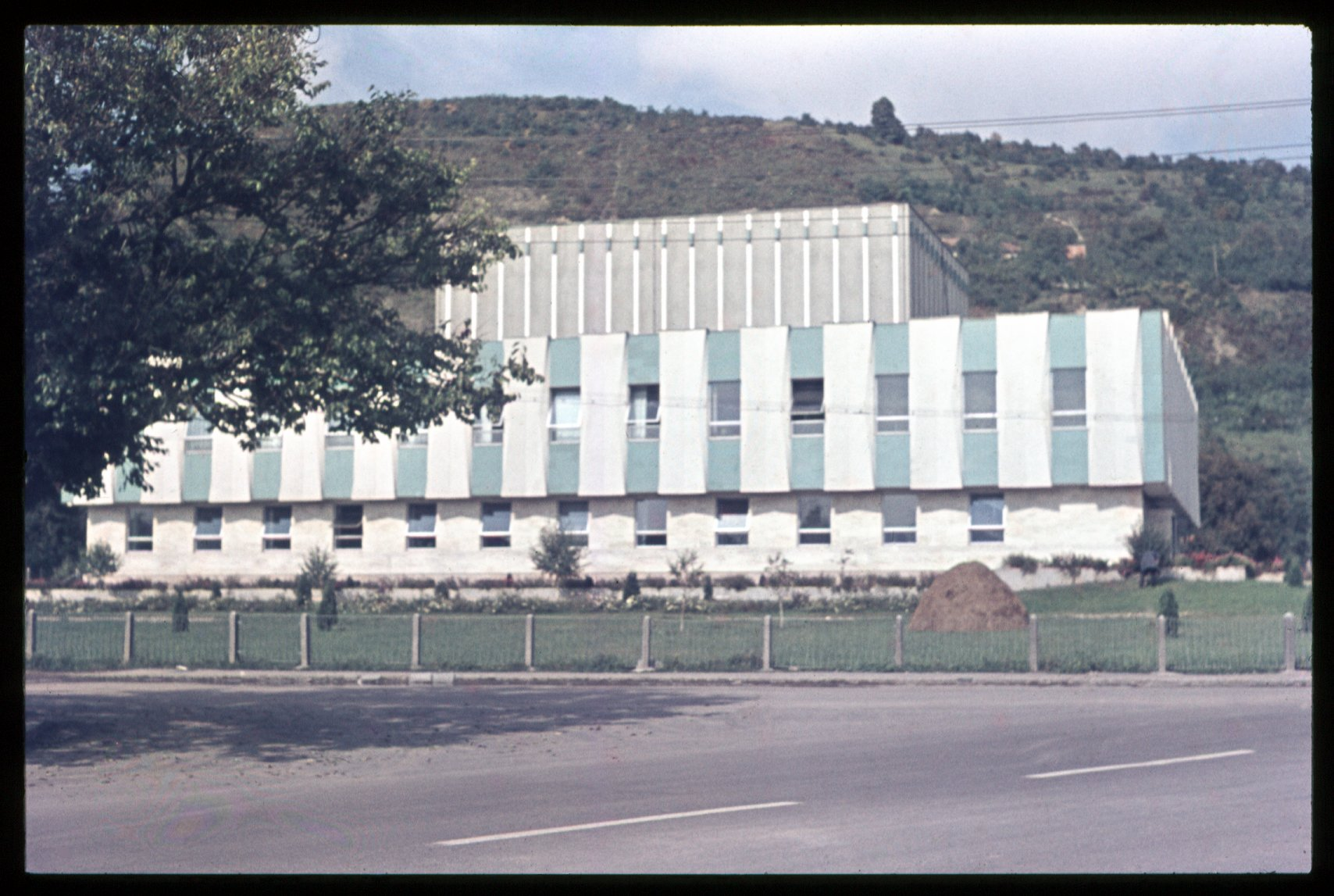
1967, the newly built Casa Radio

Starting with 1974, there was a second phase of building apartment blocks, finished in the late 1970s. The third phase, completed in the early 1980s would significantly overcrowd the area, since many of the old green spaces from the original project, and some of the old detached houses would be replaced by further apartment blocks, and deviate from the original project.

After 1989, Grigorescu continued to grow through new housing development, including expansion onto the slopes toward the Hoia hill. The post-communist period also brought a diversification of local institutions and community life, including the construction of new churches serving several different denominations.

== The legend of Donath ==
There is a local legend associated with the name Donath. In its best-known form, a shepherd named Donath is said to have noticed Ottoman troops attempting to cut through the Hoia Hill, in a place which is known today as Tăietura Turcului ("Turkish Cut") in order to divert the Someș toward the Nădăș valley and deprive the city of drinking water; after rushing to warn the town authorities, he collapses and dies, and a stone statue is later erected near the Hoia hillside in gratitude. The tale was recorded in the late 19th century and survives in several variants. The Donath name appears to have entered the legend through association with the local statues of Saint Donathus (Donath) while the “Turkish cut” is better understood as a road-cut feature shaped by local terrain and unstable clay soils rather than any Ottoman engineering project.

== Description ==
Today, the Grigorescu district occupies the broad, mostly flat river terrace on the northern bank of the Someșul Mic, beneath the slopes of Cetățuie Hill and the Hoia hill. Its older built fabric reflects the area’s earlier identity as two adjacent zones: the inner part, towards the center features mostly villas from the late Austro-Hungarian era, reflecting the styles of eclecticism and secession. The outer area around Strada Donath, which developed more gradually still preserves some of the old detached homes, but its skyline was shaped decisively by successive infills of large apartment buildings. Some newer housing consisting of mostly detached homes can be found on the Hoia slope. Grigorescu is mostly a residential area, but it is home to several schools and churches. It also houses the local headquarters for Radio Cluj and TVR. Another significant building is Grand Hotel Napoca.
