= Cojocna =

- Commune
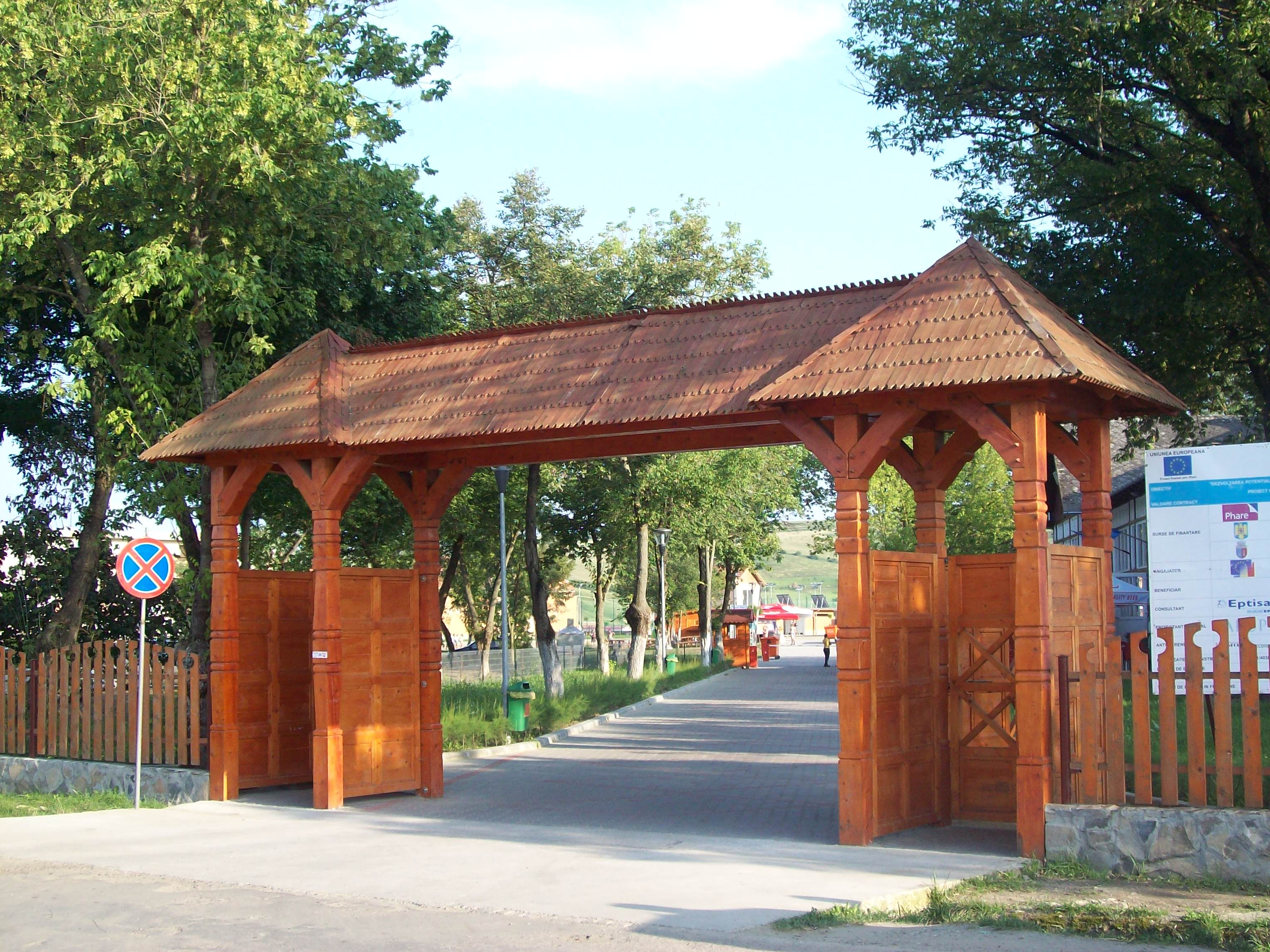
- Entrance to the Cojocna baths

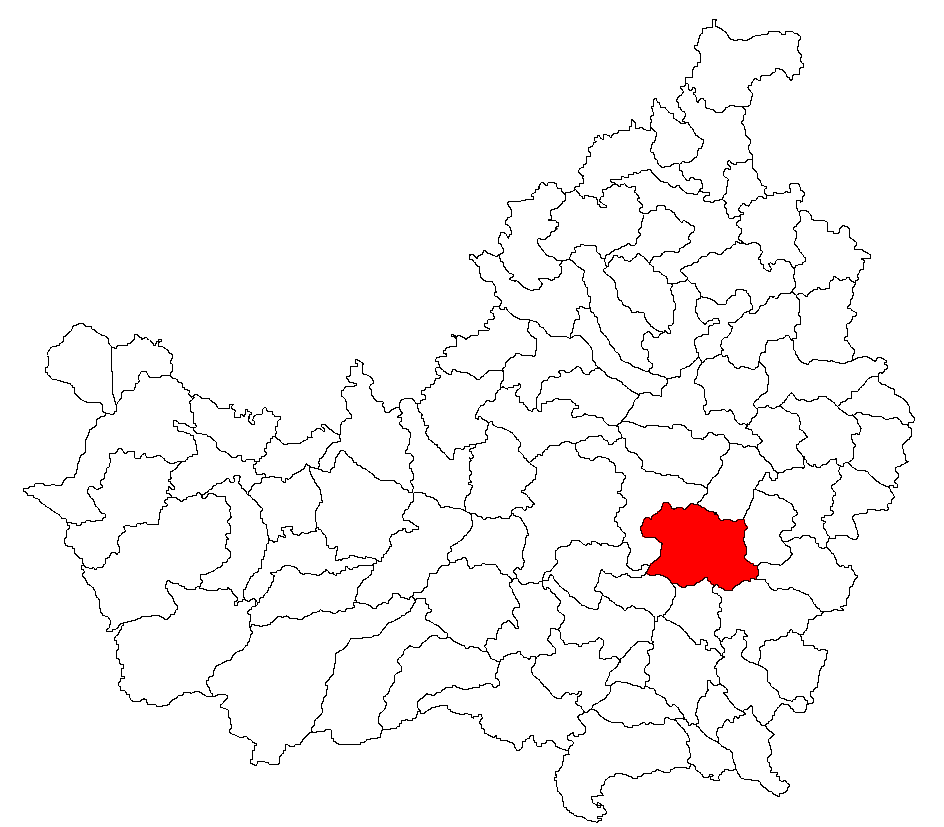
- Location in Cluj County

- Location in Romania
- Coordinates: 46°45′N 23°50′E
- Country: Romania
- County: Cluj
- Established: 1199
- Subdivisions: Boj-Cătun, Boju, Cara, Cojocna, Huci, Iuriu de Câmpie, Moriști, Straja

Government
  - Mayor (2020–2024): Sorin Radu Ranga (PNL)
- Area: 238.63 km^{2} (92.14 sq mi)
- Elevation: 334 m (1,096 ft)
- Population (2021-12-01): 4,291
  - Density: 17.98/km^{2} (46.57/sq mi)
- Time zone: UTC+02:00 (EET)
  - Summer (DST): UTC+03:00 (EEST)
- Postal code: 407240
- Area code: +(40) x64
- Vehicle reg.: CJ
- Website: comunacojocna.ro

Cojocna (Hungarian: Kolozs; German: Salzgrub, Klosmarkt) is a commune in Cluj County, Transylvania, Romania. It is composed of eight villages: Boj-Cătun (Bósi alagút), Boju (Kolozsbós), Cara (Kolozskara), Cojocna, Huci (Cserealja), Iuriu de Câmpie (Mezőőr), Moriști (Hurubák), and Straja (Szávatanya).

Located in the central-east part of the county, the commune belongs to the Cluj-Napoca metropolitan area.

== Demographics ==
Historical population
Year	Pop.	±%
1850	5,341	—
1880	5,237	−1.9%
1890	6,075	+16.0%
1900	6,410	+5.5%
1910	7,316	+14.1%
1920	7,177	−1.9%
1930	7,971	+11.1%
1941	8,129	+2.0%
1956	8,445	+3.9%
1966	7,721	−8.6%
1977	7,332	−5.0%
1992	4,563	−37.8%
2002	4,376	−4.1%
2011	4,194	−4.2%
2021	4,291	+2.3%
Source: Census data

According to the census from 2011, there were 4,194 people living in this commune; of this population, 55.8% were ethnic Romanians, 20.4% were ethnic Roma, and 16.7% were ethnic Hungarians. At the 2021 census, Cojocna had a population of 4,291.

== Natives ==
- Liviu Mocan (born 1955), sculptor
- Grigore Răceanu (1906 – 1996), communist politician and dissident
- János Spáda (1877 – 1913), architect
