= Orban (name) =

Orbán or Orban is a surname and occasional given name. Notable people with the name include:

== Surname ==
- Adrienn Orbán (born 1986), Hungarian handballer
- Alex Orban (1939–2021), American fencer
- Anita Orbán (born 1974), Hungarian politician
- Árpád Orbán (1938–2008), Hungarian footballer
- Attila Orbán (born 1990), Hungarian ice hockey player
- Balázs Orbán (1829–1890), Hungarian writer
- Bill Orban (1922–2003), Canadian athlete, scientist and academic
- Bill Orban (ice hockey) (born 1944), Canadian ice hockey player
- Desiderius Orban (1884–1986), Hungarian painter, printmaker and teacher
- Éva Orbán (born 1984), Hungarian hammer thrower
- Ferenc Orbán (1904–1989), Hungarian athlete
- Frank Orban (born 1964), Belgian cyclist
- Gáspár Orbán (born 1992), Hungarian footballer, son of Viktor
- Gift Orban (born 2002), Nigerian footballer
- György Orbán (born 1947), Hungarian composer
- László Orbán (disambiguation), multiple people
- Leonard Orban (born 1961), Romanian politician
- Lucas Orban (born 1989), Argentine footballer
- Ludovic Orban (born 1963), Romanian politician, former Prime Minister of Romania
- Nándor von Orbán (1910–1981), Hungarian modern pentathlete
- Olga Szabó-Orbán (1938–2022), Romanian fencer
- Peter Orban, Swedish sprint canoer
- Rémy Orban (1880–1951), Belgian rower
- Teale Orban (born 1986), Canadian football player
- Viktor Orbán (born 1963), Hungarian politician, former Prime Minister of Hungary
- Walthère Frère-Orban (1812–1896), Belgian politician
- Willi Orban (born 1992), Hungarian footballer

== Given name ==
- Orbán (ironmaster) (died 1453), Hungarian iron founder, inventor and engineer
- Orbán Kolompár (born 1963), Hungarian politician
