= László Orbán =

László Orbán may refer to:

- László Orbán (boxer) (1949–2009), Hungarian boxer
- László Orbán (fencer) (1930–2018), Hungarian fencer and mathematician
- László Orbán (politician) (1912–1978), Hungarian politician
- László Orbán (sport shooter) (born 1960), Hungarian sports shooter
