= Cluj Arena =

Stadium in Cluj-Napoca, Romania

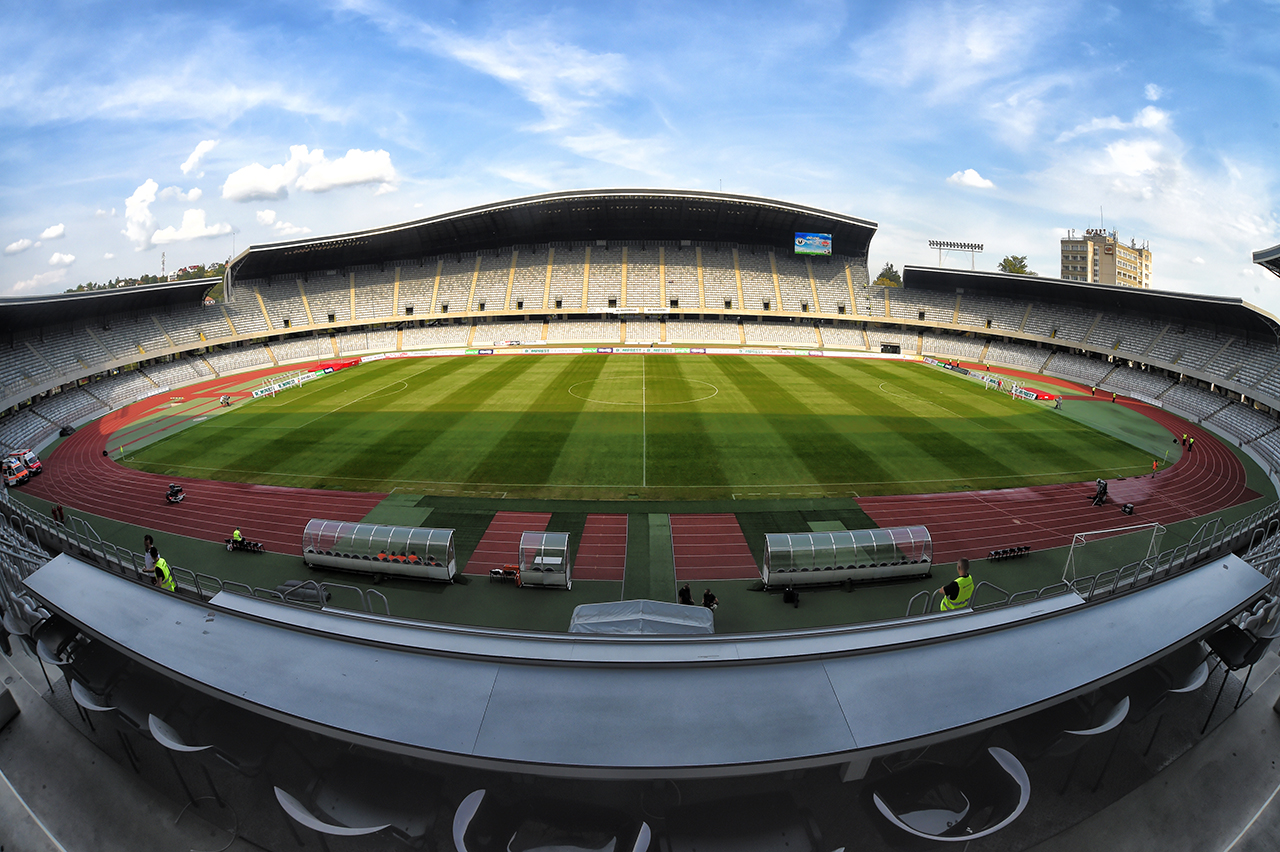
- UEFA
- Interactive map of Cluj Arena
- Former names: Ion Moina Stadium
- Address: 2 Aleea Stadionului
- Location: Cluj-Napoca, Romania
- Coordinates: 46°46′6″N 23°34′20″E
- Owner: Cluj County Council
- Operator: Cluj County Council
- Capacity: 30,355
- Executive suites: 1,459
- Record attendance: Concert: 90,000 (Untold Festival, August 2019)
- Field size: 105 m × 68 m (115 yd × 74 yd)

Construction
- Groundbreaking: 16 July 2009
- Built: 2009–2011
- Opened: 1 October 2011
- Cost: €44 million (€59 million in 2021)
- Architect: Dico și Țigănaș
- Main contractor: ACI Cluj

Tenants
- Universitatea Cluj (Liga I) (2011–present); Olimpia Cluj (Liga I) (2012–present); Universitatea Cluj (SuperLiga) (2013–present); Romania national football team (2016–present)

Website
- clujarena.ro

Cluj Arena (Romanian pronunciation: [ˈkluʒ aˈrena]) is a multi-purpose stadium in Cluj-Napoca, Romania. It serves as the home of Universitatea Cluj of the Liga I and was completed on 1 October 2011. It is also the home of the Untold Festival. The facility, owned by the county council of Cluj, can also be used for a variety of other activities such as track and field events and rugby union games. It replaced the Stadionul Ion Moina, which served as Universitatea Cluj's home from 1919 until the end of the 2007-08 season.

The stadium seats 30,355, making it the fourth largest stadium in Romania by seating capacity. It has four two-tiered stands, all of them covered. The seats of the stadium are grey.

The building is located west of Central Park, and next to the Someșul Mic river and the BT Arena.

== History ==
The first stadium for football and track and field was built from 1908 to 1911. The Stadionul Ion Moina was opened in 1911, consisting of a single wooden stand with a capacity of just 1,500. The first game at the new stadium was a friendly against Turkish team Galatasaray, which Cluj won 8–1.

New wooden stands were built in 1961, increasing the capacity to 28,000. Demolition of the Stadionul Ion Moina officially began on 20 November 2008. Construction of the new Cluj Arena began on July 16, 2009 The stadium opened its gate for the public on 1 October 2011. Eight days later, Scorpions performed at the stadium. The show was sold out with a crowd of 45,000. The next day, Smokie played at Cluj Arena. The first match at the stadium was a game played between Universitatea Cluj and Kuban Krasnodar. The first official match was Universitatea Cluj vs. FC Brașov on 17 October 2011, which finished 1–0.

== Matches ==
=== Romania national football team ===
International football matches
Date	Competition	Home	Away	Score	Attendance
27 March 2016	Friendly	Romania	Spain	0–0	28,000
4 September 2016	2018 FIFA World Cup qualification	Romania	Montenegro	1–1	25,468
26 March 2017	2018 FIFA World Cup qualification	Romania	Denmark	0–0	26,895
13 June 2017	Friendly	Romania	Chile	3–2	9,000
16 June 2018	Friendly	Romania Legends	(Spain) Barça Legends	0–2	28,000
17 November 2022	Friendly	Romania	Slovenia	1–2	6,845

== Other events ==
=== Concerts ===
Concerts at Cluj Arena
Date	Artist	Tour	Attendance
8 October 2011	(Germany) Scorpions	Get Your Sting and Blackout World Tour	40,000
9 October 2011	(England) Smokie		20,000
19 July 2012	(Sweden) Roxette	World Tour	22,000
7 June 2013	(England) Deep Purple	Cluj Arena Music Fest	20,000
8 June 2013	(England) UB40	Cluj Arena Music Fest	13,000
17 May 2014	(Romania) various	Forza ZU	55,000
30 July – 2 August 2015	various	Untold Festival	240,000
4–7 August 2016	various	Untold Festival	300,000
25 June 2017	(Italy) Andrea Bocelli	Andrea Bocelli World Tour 2017	15,000
23 July 2017	(England) Depeche Mode	Global Spirit Tour	31,923
2–5 August 2018	various	Untold Festival	355,000
1–4 August 2019	various	Untold Festival	372,000
9–12 September 2021	various	Untold Festival	265,000
4 August 2023	(United States) Imagine Dragons	Mercury World Tour	

== Gallery ==
Cluj Arena (exterior walls)

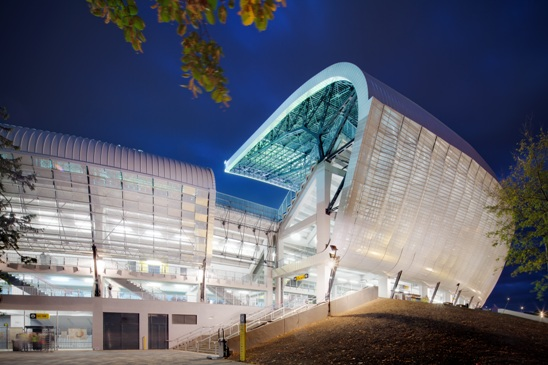
Cluj Arena at night (exterior walls)

Main stand external view

External view of the main stand and headquarters
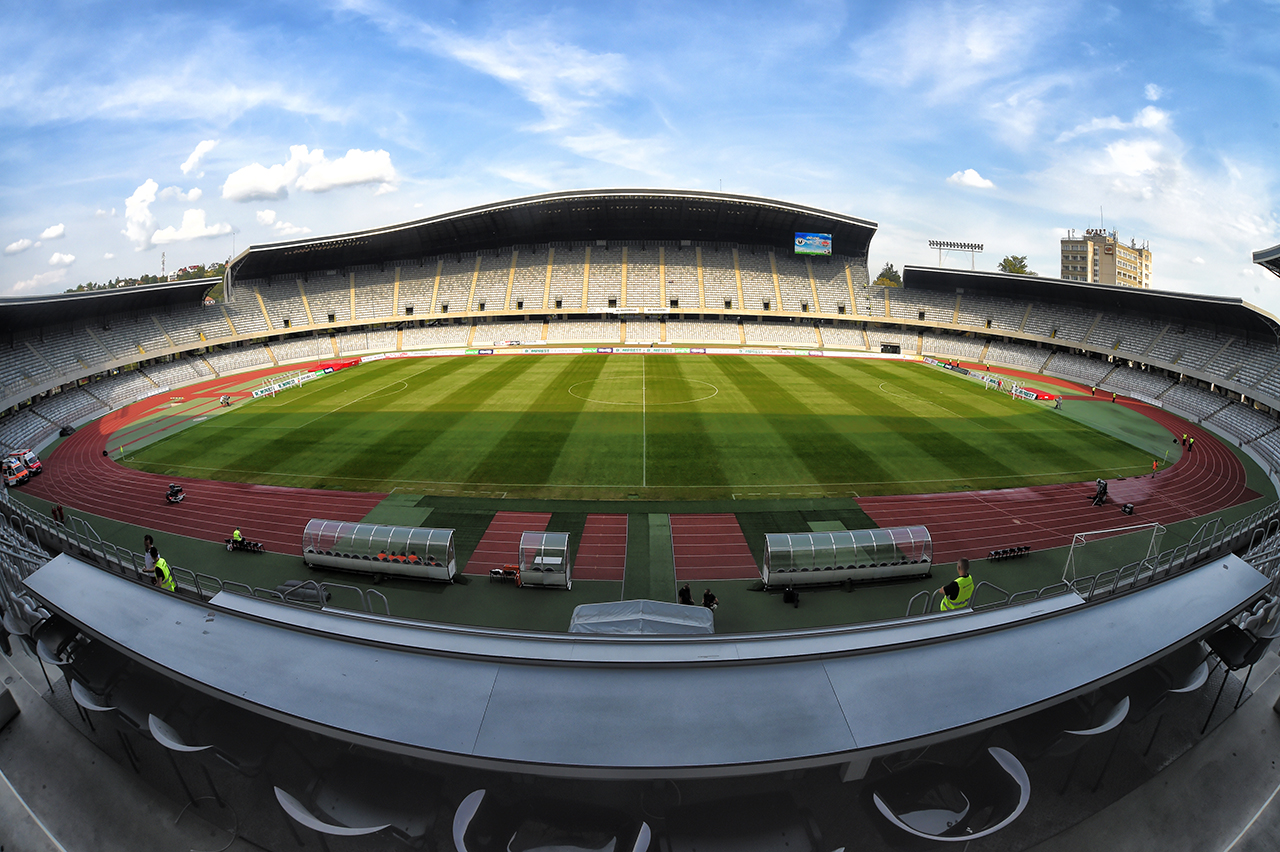
View from the upper tier of Cluj Arena's main stand

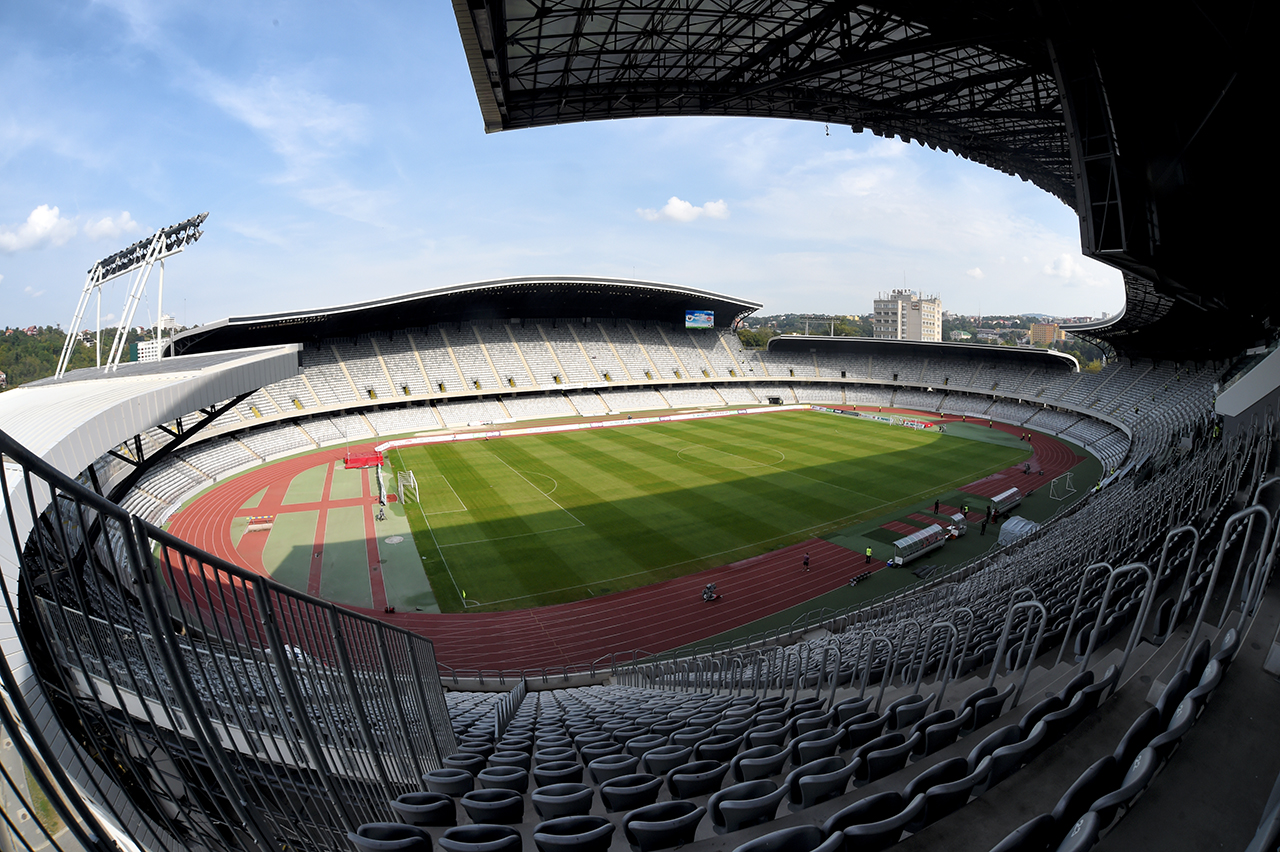
View from the upper tier of Cluj Arena's main stand (II)

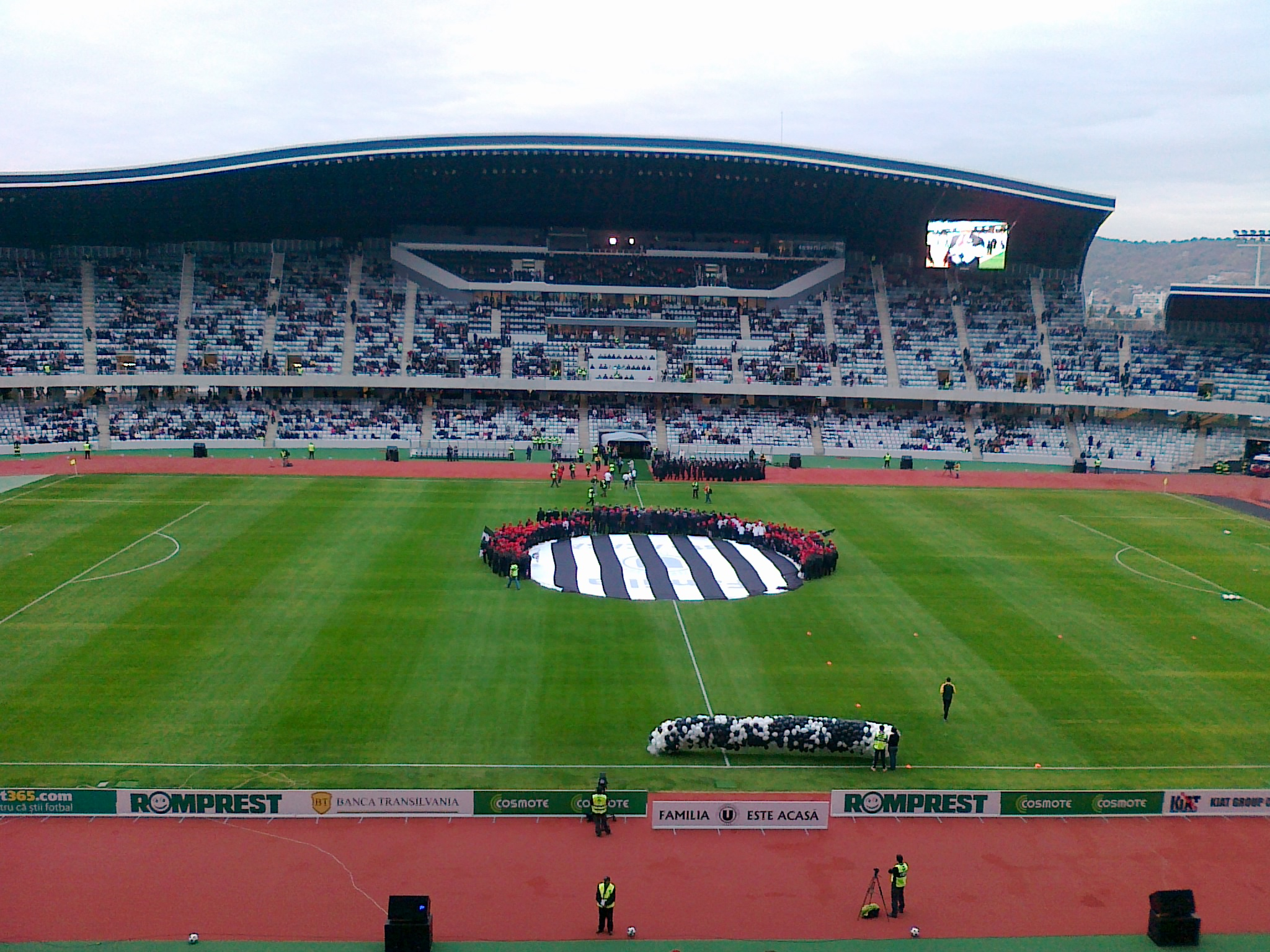
Stadium's inaugural match in 2011

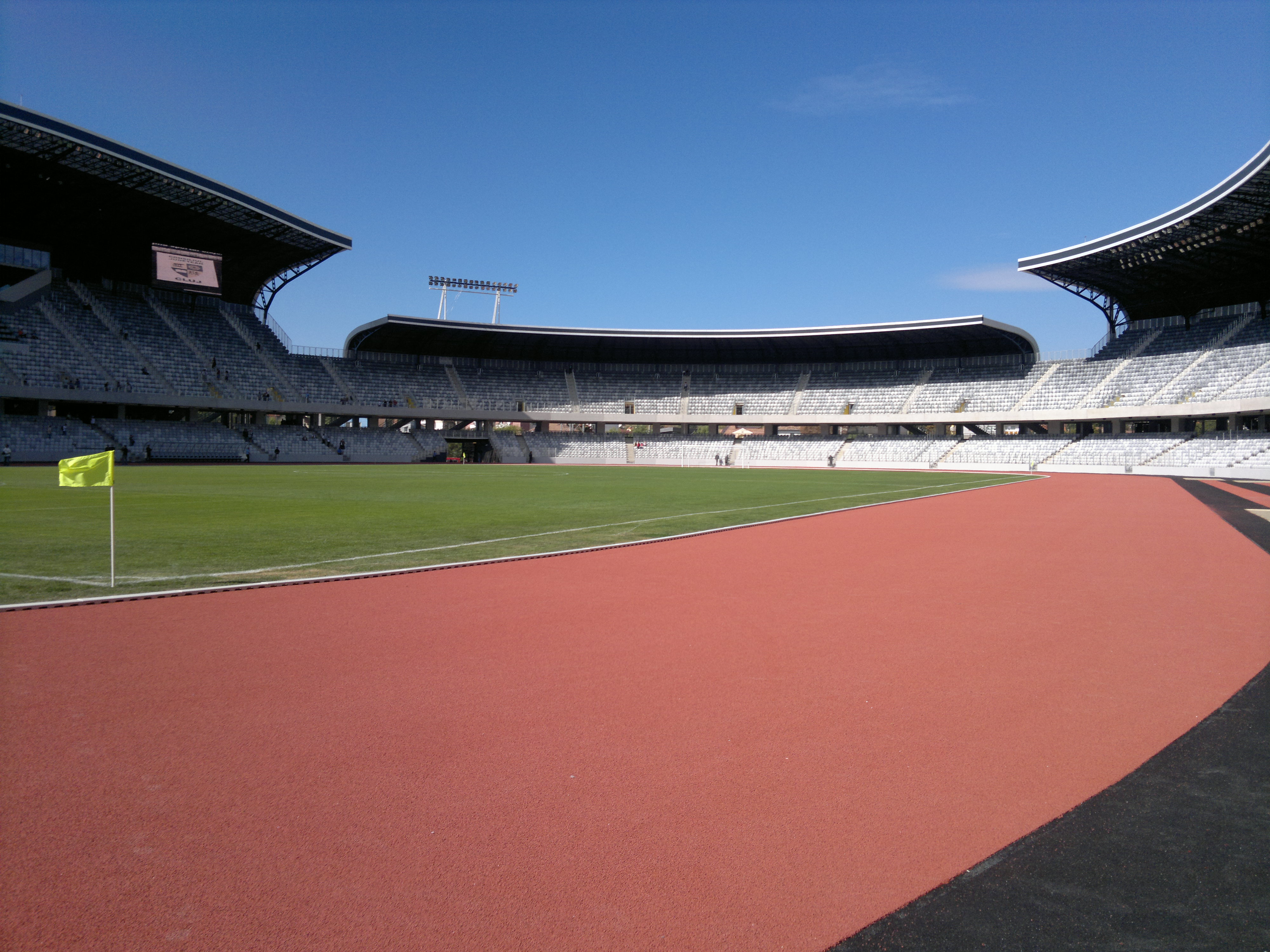
Scenic view from the pitch

== See also ==
- List of football stadiums in Romania
- List of European stadiums by capacity
- Lists of stadiums
