= Dico și Țigănaș =

Romanian architectural firm

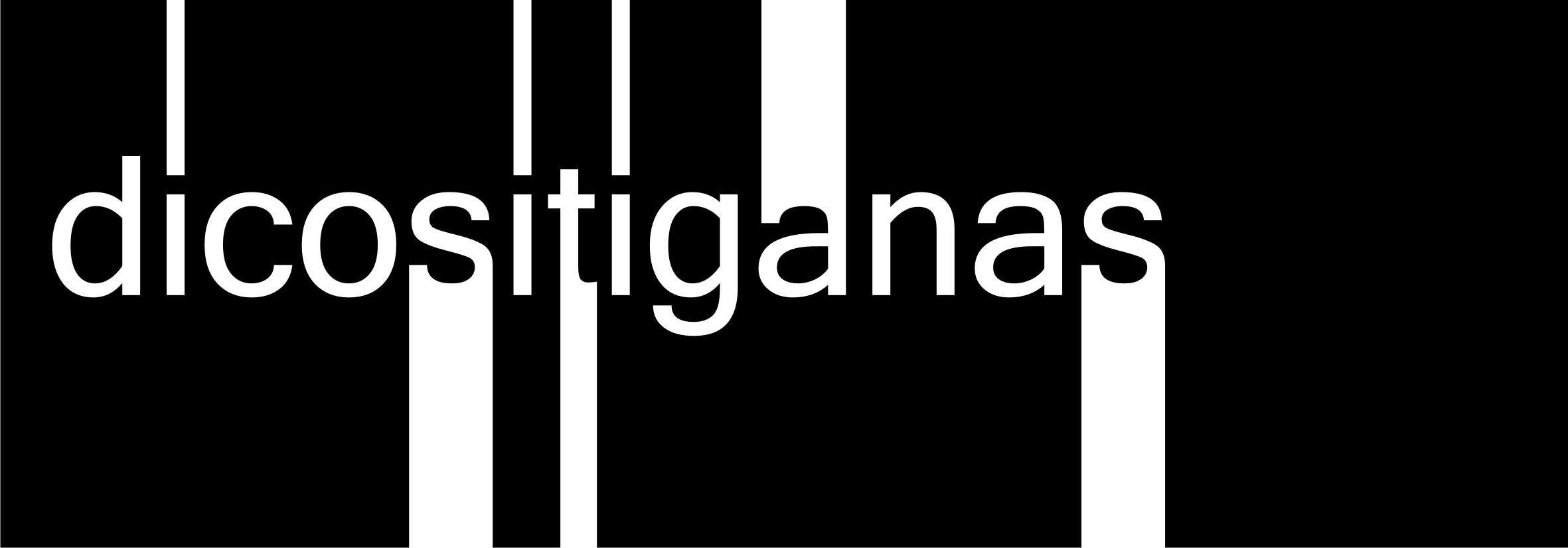
- Dico și Țigănaș

Practice information
- Partners: Florin Dico, General Manager; Șerban Țigănaș, President
- Founded: 1997
- Location: Cluj-Napoca, Romania
- Coordinates: 46°45′16″N 23°35′45″E

Significant works and honors
- Buildings: Cluj Arena; CFR Cluj Stadium; Sala Polivalentă (Cluj); Stadionul Ion Oblemenco; Liberty Center Mall (Bucharest)
- Awards: 2011 OAR Prize for Constructions over 1000 sqm for Cluj Arena

Dico și Țigănaș is an architectural firm based in Cluj-Napoca, Romania since March 1997. The practice is led by its founders, engineer Florin Dico and architect Șerban Țigănaș, who is currently also the president of the Romanian Order of Architects. The firm deals in creation of architectural, construction and installation designs for apartment buildings, office buildings, administrative buildings, stadiums and industrial buildings.

Dico și Țigănaș started in 1997, making projects for small companies and individuals. The project who configured the growth and evolution of the company was won in the year 2000, working for the British joint-venture, Mivan-Kier. The task was to design social housing for 30 sites in 27 Romanian cities, with a total design area of 180,300sqm. Later on, together with the same contractors, the firm designed Liberty Center Mall, New Town Apartment Buildings with 630 Apartments and malls for other seven cities in Romania. Unfortunately Mivan-Kier declared bankruptcy in 2009 and only one of the latter seven malls was built. Among its other major projects are the Bergenbier Plant and the Bosch-Rexroth Factory in Blaj, Olimpia Business Center in Cluj-Napoca and various residential compounds. The firm's latest and most renowned projects are the expansion of the CFR Cluj Stadium, the design of the Cluj Arena and multifunctional sportshall in Cluj-Napoca, Sala Polivalentă.

== Awards ==
- Nominated for Building of the Year 2012 on http://www.archdaily.com, "The world's most visited architecture website"
- 2011 OAR Award for Constructions over 1000 sqm for Cluj Arena
- 2009 OAR Awards for Cluj Arena and for the Office Building of the Transylvanian Museum of Ethnography
- Aquapanel Challenge Prize by knauf with ELM OFFICE BUILDING
- Award for Rehabilitation and Modernization of the Câmpina Downtown Area

== Selected works ==
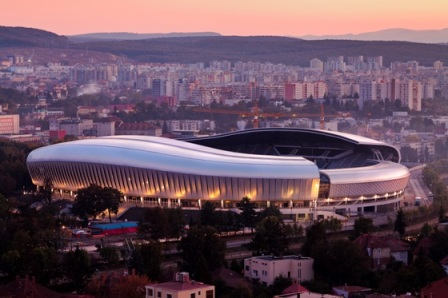
Cluj Arena

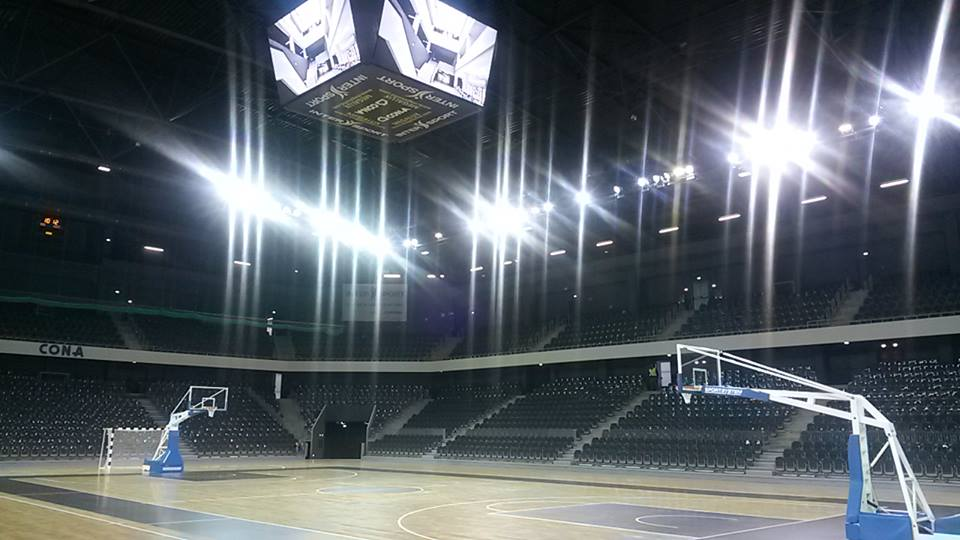
Cluj-Napoca Polyvalent Hall

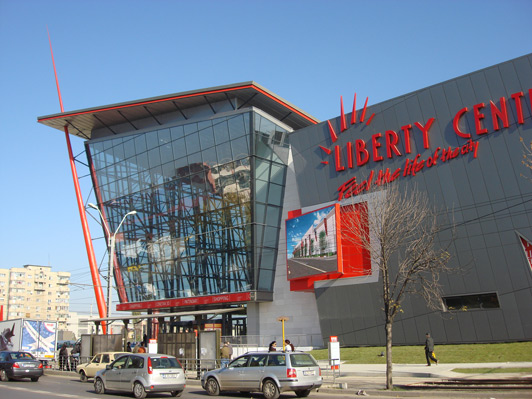
Liberty Center Mall

Stadionul Ion Oblemenco
