= Dr. Constantin Rădulescu Stadium =

Romanian football stadium

- Gruia
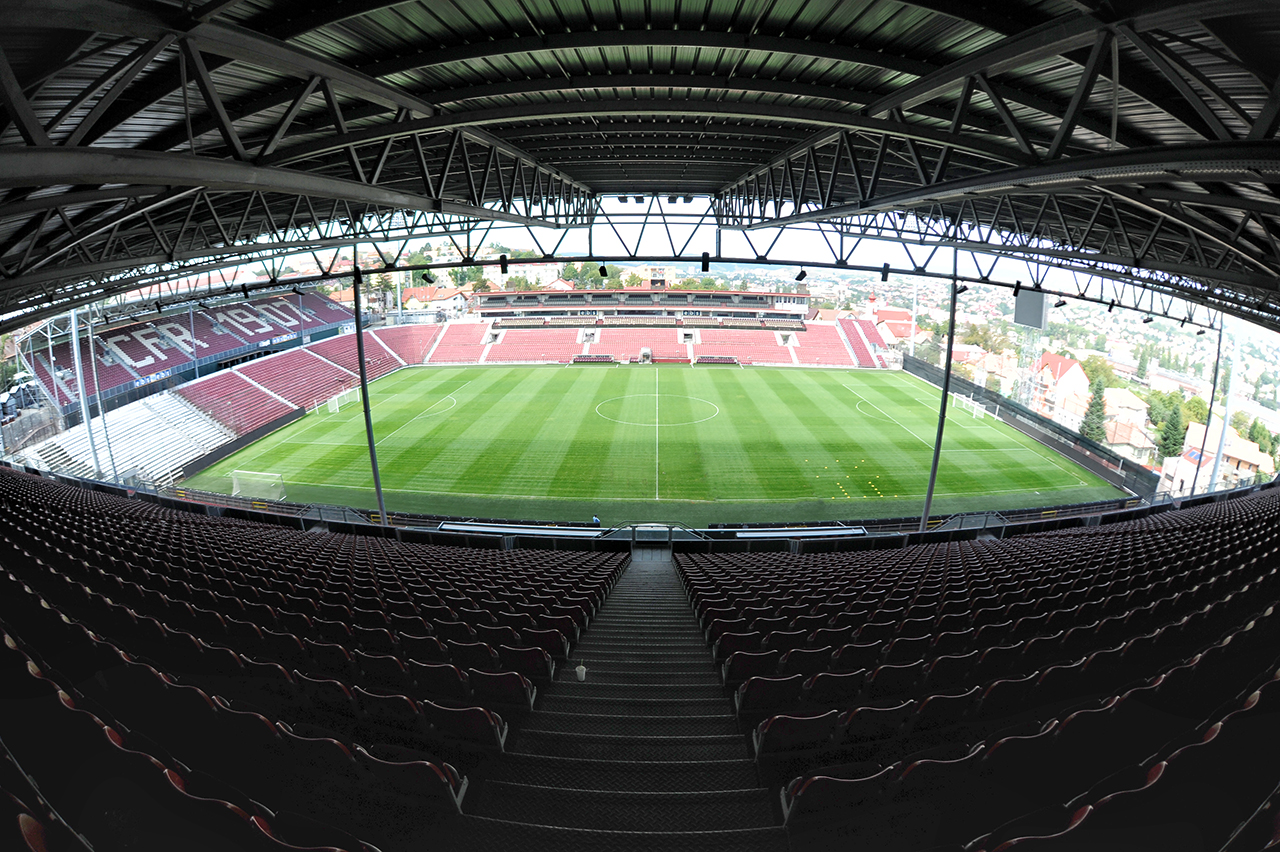
- Interactive map of Dr. Constantin Rădulescu Stadium
- Address: Str. Romulus Vuia, nr. 23
- Location: Cluj-Napoca, Romania
- Coordinates: 46°46′46″N 23°34′39″E
- Owner: CFR Cluj
- Capacity: 17,408
- Surface: Grass
- Field size: 105 x 60m

Construction
- Opened: 1973
- Renovated: 2008
- Cost: €30 million (expansion) (€42 million in 2019 euros)
- Architect: Dico și Țigănaș

Tenant
- CFR Cluj (1973–present)

The Dr. Constantin Rădulescu Stadium, informally also known as CFR Cluj Stadium, is a football-only stadium in the Gruia district, Cluj-Napoca, Romania and is home ground of CFR Cluj. The stadium is named after Constantin Rădulescu (1924–2001), a former player, coach and club doctor.

== History ==
The stadium was originally built in 1973. Before 2004 it had a capacity of about 10,000 seats, hosting the home games of CFR Cluj, mostly in the second and third divisions of Romanian football.

As CFR Cluj qualified for the Champions League group stage in 2008, the stadium was expanded. The expansion was designed by Dico și Țigănaș, built by Transilvania Construction, and completed in September 2008, increasing the capacity to 22,198 seats. There are also plans for further expansions.

The stadium was inaugurated with an international game between CFR Cluj and Braga, a game that CFR Cluj won 3–1.

On 6 September 2008, Romania played Lithuania in a 2010 FIFA World Cup qualifier. It was the first match of the Romania national team in Cluj-Napoca after 85 years.

== Events ==
=== Association football ===
International football matches
Date	Competition	Home	Away	Score	Attendance
6 September 2008	2010 FIFA World Cup qualification	Romania	Lithuania	0–3	14,000
9 November 2017	Friendly	Romania	Turkey	2–0	16,000
26 March 2019	UEFA Euro 2020 qualification	Romania	Faroe Islands	4–1	10,502

=== Association football ===
International football clubs matches
Date	Competition	Home	Away	Score	Attendance
18 June 2005	UEFA Intertoto Cup	(Romania) CFR Cluj	(Lithuania) Vėtra	3–2	4,050
2 July 2005	UEFA Intertoto Cup	(Romania) CFR Cluj	(Spain) Athletic Bilbao	1–0	6,120
17 July 2005	UEFA Intertoto Cup	(Romania) CFR Cluj	(France) Saint-Étienne	1–1	3,200
3 August 2005	UEFA Intertoto Cup	(Romania) CFR Cluj	(Lithuania) Žalgiris Vilnius	5–1	5,800
9 August 2005	UEFA Intertoto Cup	(Romania) CFR Cluj	(France) Lens	1–1	6,700
21 July 2007	Friendly	(Romania) CFR Cluj	(Portugal) Benfica	2–2	~12,000
16 August 2007	UEFA Cup	(Romania) CFR Cluj	(Cyprus) Anorthosis	1–3	7,100
1 October 2008	UEFA Champions League	(Romania) CFR Cluj	(England) Chelsea	0–0	20,320
4 November 2008	UEFA Champions League	(Romania) CFR Cluj	(France) Bordeaux	1–2	19,380
26 November 2008	UEFA Champions League	(Romania) CFR Cluj	(Italy) Roma	1–3	19,292
27 August 2009	UEFA Europa League	(Romania) CFR Cluj	(Bosnia and Herzegovina) Sarajevo	2–1	10,800
17 September 2009	UEFA Europa League	(Romania) CFR Cluj	(Denmark) Copenhagen	2–0	8,414
5 November 2009	UEFA Europa League	(Romania) CFR Cluj	(Czech Republic) Sparta Prague	2–3	7,227
16 December 2009	UEFA Europa League	(Romania) CFR Cluj	(Netherlands) PSV Eindhoven	0–2	3,000
15 September 2010	UEFA Champions League	(Romania) CFR Cluj	(Switzerland) Basel	2–1	9,593
3 November 2010	UEFA Champions League	(Romania) CFR Cluj	(Germany) Bayern Munich	0–4	14,097
8 December 2010	UEFA Champions League	(Romania) CFR Cluj	(Italy) Roma	1–1	12,800
1 August 2012	UEFA Champions League	(Romania) CFR Cluj	(Czech Republic) Slovan Liberec	1–0	6,914
29 August 2012	UEFA Champions League	(Romania) CFR Cluj	(Switzerland) Basel	1–0	15,481
2 October 2012	UEFA Champions League	(Romania) CFR Cluj	(England) Manchester United	1–2	16,259
7 November 2012	UEFA Champions League	(Romania) CFR Cluj	(Turkey) Galatasaray	1–3	16,232
20 November 2012	UEFA Champions League	(Romania) CFR Cluj	(Portugal) Braga	3–1	14,635
21 February 2013	UEFA Champions League	(Romania) CFR Cluj	(Italy) Inter Milan	0–3	11,027
17 July 2014	UEFA Europa League	(Romania) CFR Cluj	(Serbia) Jagodina	0–0	5,600
7 August 2014	UEFA Europa League	(Romania) CFR Cluj	(Belarus) Dinamo Minsk	0–2	5,137
5 September 2014	Friendly	(Romania) CFR Cluj	(Ukraine) Shakhtar Donetsk	3–3	3,100
8 October 2017	Friendly	(Romania) CFR Cluj	(Cyprus) Aris Limassol	2–1	~1,000
24 July 2018	UEFA Champions League	(Romania) CFR Cluj	(Sweden) Malmö FF	0–1	6,950
16 August 2018	UEFA Europa League	(Romania) CFR Cluj	(Armenia) Alashkert	5–0	5,500
30 August 2018	UEFA Europa League	(Romania) CFR Cluj	(Luxembourg) Dudelange	2–3	12,000
17 July 2019	UEFA Champions League	(Romania) CFR Cluj	(Kazakhstan) Astana	3–1	8,092
24 July 2019	UEFA Champions League	(Romania) CFR Cluj	(Israel) Maccabi Tel Aviv	1–0	11,150
7 August 2019	UEFA Champions League	(Romania) CFR Cluj	(Scotland) Celtic	1–1	13,055
20 August 2019	UEFA Champions League	(Romania) CFR Cluj	(Czech Republic) Slavia Prague	0–1	15,196
19 September 2019	UEFA Europa League	(Romania) CFR Cluj	(Italy) Lazio	2–1	9,222
7 November 2019	UEFA Europa League	(Romania) CFR Cluj	(France) Rennes	1–0	11,067
12 December 2019	UEFA Europa League	(Romania) CFR Cluj	(Scotland) Celtic	2–0	12,890
20 February 2020	UEFA Europa League	(Romania) CFR Cluj	(Spain) Sevilla	1–1	14,820
26 August 2020	UEFA Champions League	(Romania) CFR Cluj	(Croatia) Dinamo Zagreb	2–2	
1 October 2020	UEFA Europa League	(Romania) CFR Cluj	(Finland) KuPS	3–1	
29 October 2020	UEFA Europa League	(Romania) CFR Cluj	(Switzerland) Young Boys	1–1	
26 November 2020	UEFA Europa League	(Romania) CFR Cluj	(Italy) Roma	0–2	
3 December 2020	UEFA Europa League	(Romania) CFR Cluj	(Bulgaria) CSKA Sofia	0–0	
6 July 2021	UEFA Champions League	(Romania) CFR Cluj	(Bosnia and Herzegovina) Borac Banja Luka	3–1	4,500
28 July 2021	UEFA Champions League	(Romania) CFR Cluj	(Gibraltar) Lincoln Red Imps	2–0	5,230
3 August 2021	UEFA Champions League	(Romania) CFR Cluj	(Switzerland) Young Boys	1–1	9,500
26 August 2021	UEFA Europa League	(Romania) CFR Cluj	(Serbia) Red Star Belgrade	1–2	4,200
13 July 2022	UEFA Champions League	(Romania) CFR Cluj	(Armenia) Pyunik	2–2	7,017
21 July 2022	UEFA Europa Conference League	(Romania) CFR Cluj	(Andorra) Inter Club d'Escaldes	3–0	4,421
11 August 2022	UEFA Europa Conference League	(Romania) CFR Cluj	(Belarus) Shakhtyor Soligorsk	1–0	6,700
25 August 2022	UEFA Europa Conference League	(Romania) CFR Cluj	(Slovenia) NK Maribor	1–0	9,852
15 September 2022	UEFA Europa Conference League	(Romania) CFR Cluj	(Turkey) Sivasspor	0–1	7,026
13 October 2022	UEFA Europa Conference League	(Romania) CFR Cluj	(Czech Republic) Slavia Prague	2–0	11,218
3 November 2022	UEFA Europa Conference League	(Romania) CFR Cluj	(Kosovo) Ballkani	1–0	11,723
23 February 2023	UEFA Europa Conference League	(Romania) CFR Cluj	(Italy) Lazio	0–0	15,955
27 July 2023	UEFA Europa Conference League	(Romania) CFR Cluj	(Turkey) Adana Demirspor	1–1	9,487
25 July 2024	UEFA Europa Conference League	(Romania) CFR Cluj	(Belarus) Neman Grodno	0–0	5,366
15 August 2024	UEFA Europa Conference League	(Romania) CFR Cluj	(Israel) Maccabi Petah Tikva	1–0	5,490
22 August 2024	UEFA Europa Conference League	(Romania) CFR Cluj	(Cyprus) Pafos	1–0	5,826
17 July 2025	UEFA Europa League	(Romania) CFR Cluj	(Hungary) Paks	3–0	6,512
31 July 2025	UEFA Europa League	(Romania) CFR Cluj	(Switzerland) Lugano	1–0	8,564
7 August 2025	UEFA Europa League	(Romania) CFR Cluj	(Portugal) Braga	1–2	10,383
28 August 2025	UEFA Conference League	(Romania) CFR Cluj	(Sweden) BK Häcken	1–0	3,321
30 July 2026	UEFA Conference League	(Romania) CFR Cluj	(Armenia) Alashkert	3–0	5,465
6 August 2026	UEFA Conference League	(Romania) CFR Cluj	(Norway) Tromsø	0–5	6,729

== Gallery ==
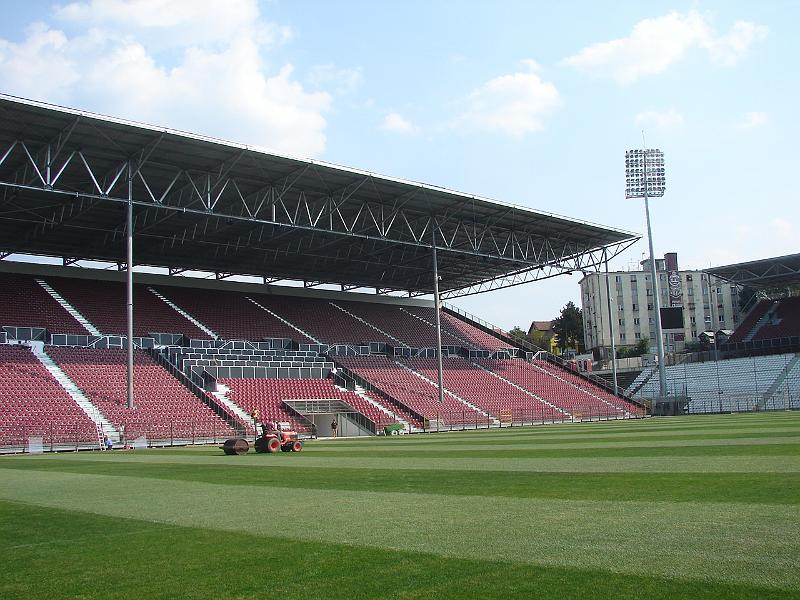
View of Sector 2 from the pitch

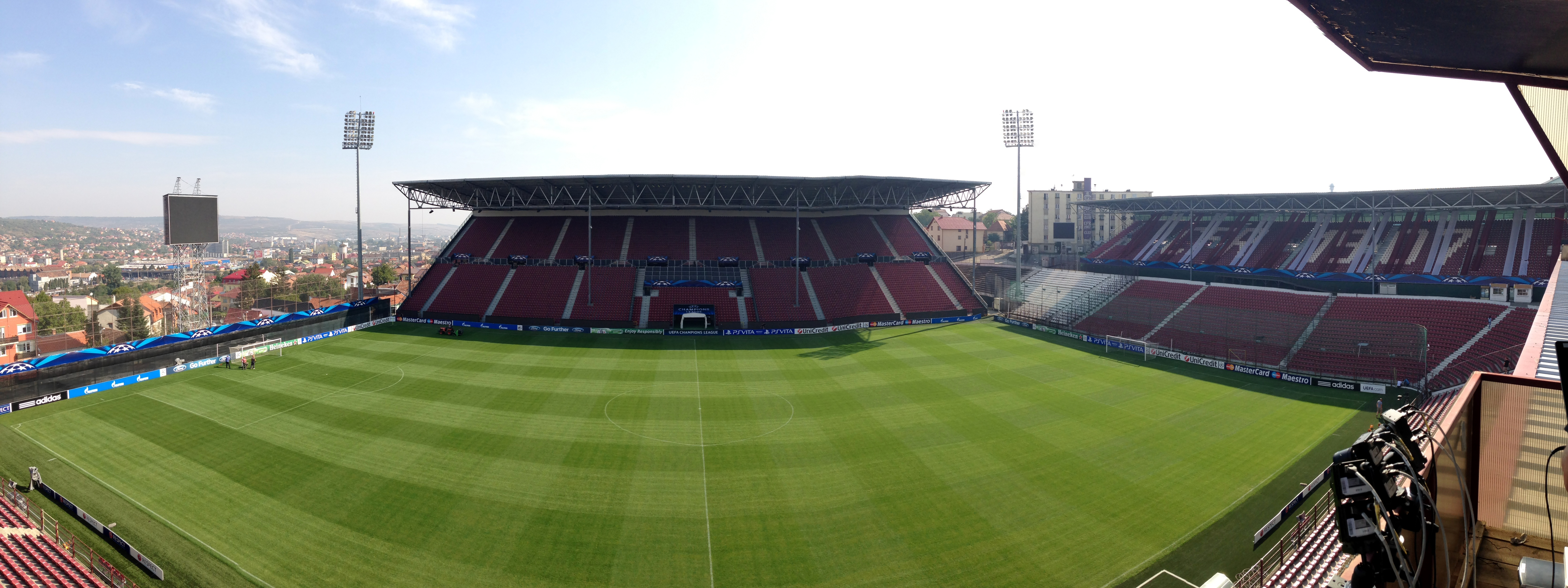
View of the 2nd Sector from Sector 1

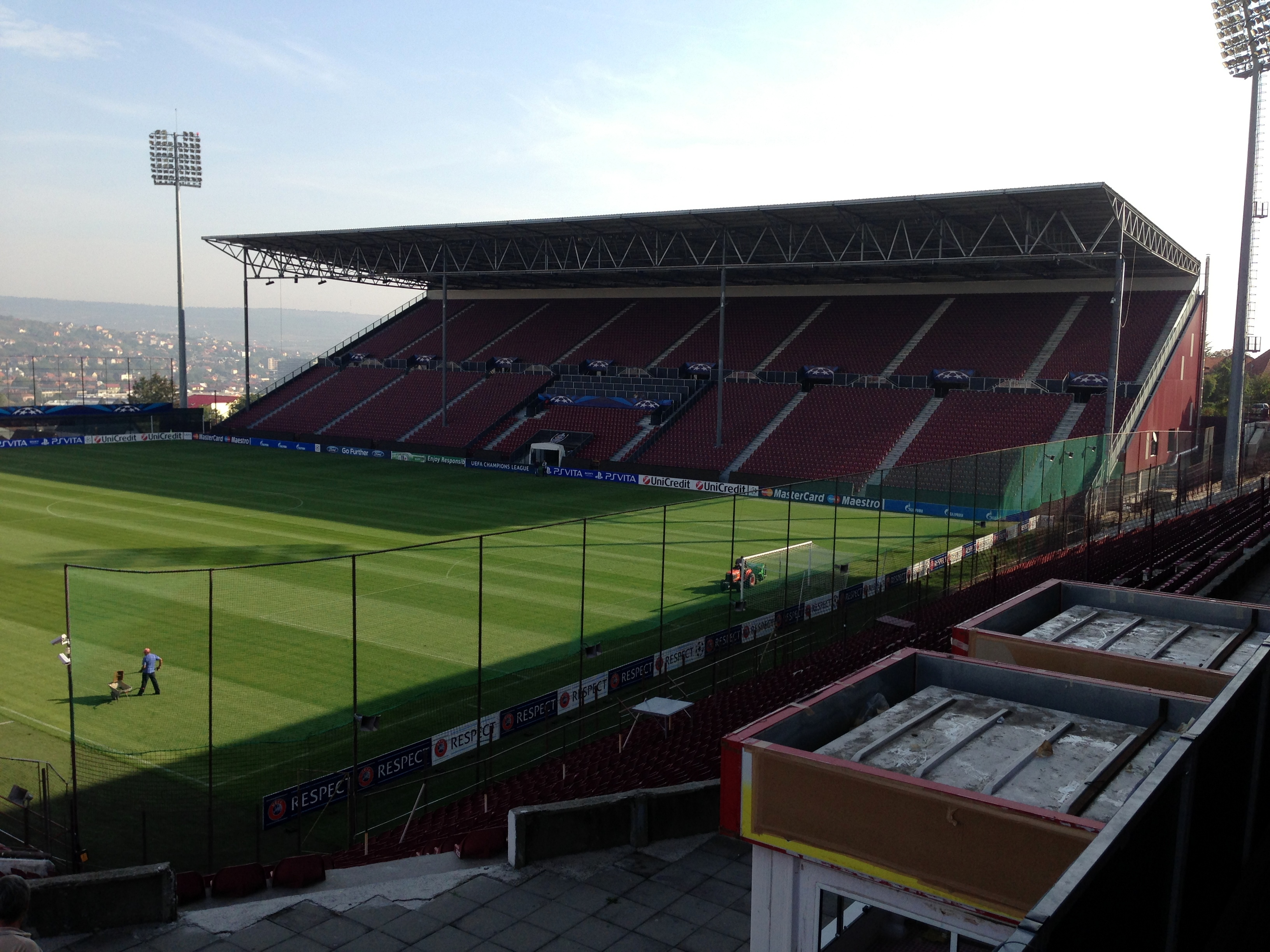
View of the 2nd Sector from the Upper Sector

Exterior view of the 1st and VIP Sectors

== See also ==
- List of football stadiums in Romania
