= Liviu Mocan =

Romanian sculptor and poet (born 1955)

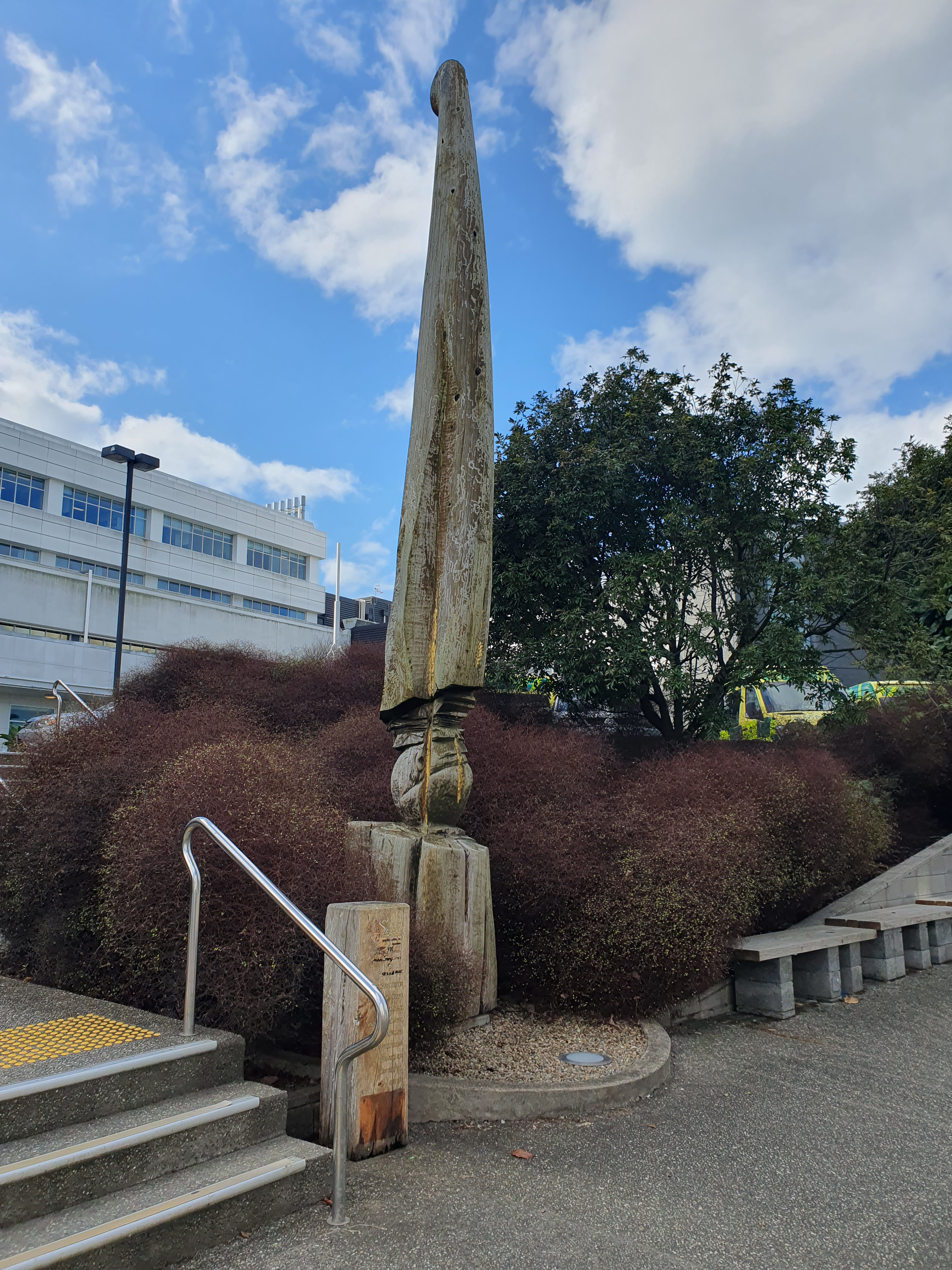
The Seed (2007), a seven-metre macrocarpa sculpture by Liviu Mocan and John Ferguson located at North Shore Hospital, Auckland, New Zealand

Liviu Mocan (born 1955) is a Romanian sculptor and poet who works with Christian and spiritual themes.

== Early life and education ==
Mocan was born and raised in Cara, Cluj County in Western Transylvania. His parents, Valer and Ana Mocan, were devoted Christians. Their faith greatly influenced Mocan's own spiritual development and the themes of his sculpture.

Mocan studied sculpture in Cluj-Napoca. He enrolled in the Romul Ladea Art High School, graduating in 1975. Mocan then attended the Academy for Visual Arts in Cluj-Napoca, graduating in 1991. Soon after, he went to the United States, becoming an artist in residence at Anderson University and Mississippi College in Clinton, Mississippi.

Mocan is married to Rodica, a lecturer at the Babeș-Bolyai University in Cluj-Napoca. They have three children: Emma Teodora, Paul Anghel, and David Timotei.

== Prizes ==
Mocan has received the "Ioan Alexandru Prize for Fine Arts" (2005, The Cultural Association Alumar, Bistrița, Romania); first prize for metal at the International Exhibition "Ars of Fire" (2001, Apollo Galleries, Bucharest); nomination for "Romanian Professional Fine Arts Prize for Sculpture" (2000); first prize at the competition for the memorial dedicated to the December 1989 Revolution (1999, Cluj-Napoca City Council); Blackhorn Gallery Prize (2000, Liverpool, UK); second place at the competition for the monument of Alexandru Ioan Cuza (1998, Cluj County Council, Romania); "Romul Ladea Prize" (1992, Small Sculpture Biennale, Arad, Romania), honorable mention (1992, Billy Graham Center, Wheaton College). In 2022, he won the Brâncuși National Award for his exhibition "The Heart of Resurrection", mounted at the Biserica Neagră in Brașov.

=== Best-known characteristic works ===
- The Seeds
- The Shot Pillars – a sculpture on Union Square in Cluj-Napoca, Romania that commemorates the demonstrators who were shot there in December 1989, during protests against the Ceaușescu regime.
- Decalogue

=== Series of works ===
- Altar (1983–1999)
- Abortion (1994–1997)
- Attitudes (1980–1985)
- Between crucifixion and flight (1976–2009)
- Bezalel (1997–2010)
- Bride and groom (1981–2010)
- Bird (1987–2010)
- Butter Lamp (1989–1997)
- Child (1995–2004)
- Communions (1998–1990)
- Decalogue (1994–2008)
- Dialogue (1989–1999)
- Eyes (1992–2009)
- Fish (2995-2009)
- Gates (1977–1995)
- Great Spirits (1977–2010)
- Harlequin (1989–1998)
- Hiob und seine Freunde (1992–1994)
- Hope (2002)
- Hypostases (1976–1990)
- Individual studies
- Interweavings (1987–2004)
- Jesus (1992–2006)
- Le Royaume des enfants (1995)
- Little transparent islands (1991)
- Living Principle (1991–1992)
- Man and God (1987–1999)
- The Martyrs (1988–2001)
- Mother (1986–2005)
- Miorita (1985–1996)
- Mine (1974–2004)
- Monumentalia (1980–1999)
- Planet earth (1993–2010)
- Pillars (1994–2004)
- Prayer (1979–2005)
- Rivers (1991–1992)
- Sebastian (1995–1996)
- Seeds (1983–2010)
- Seeds from ruins
- Shape with water pedestal (1992)
- Shot pillars (1999–2003)
- Spirals (1987–1993)
- Stained glass (1992–2005)
- The Arch of the Romanian Language (2020)
- The book with pearls (1997–2004)
- The fortress and the river (1992–2010)
- The Good Shepherd (1985–2000)
- The Hand (1988–2010)
- The Horn of Abundance (2009)
- The Ladder of Jacob (1997–2010)
- The Lamb (1990–1997)
- The Mirror (2009)
- The Mountain and his Heart (1987–1998)
- The Poet
- The Rain (1989–1997)
- The Sculptor (1996–2005)
- The Wall (1994–2005)
- The Way of the waters (1989)
- The Woman (2005–2010)
- Trinitarian Communions (1982)
- UBB rectors (2004)
- Various works (1968–2007)
- Vertical libraries (2009)
- Wells
- Wings (1977–2003)
- Yoke (1996–2004)

== Statements on his work ==
Liviu Mocan on his work: "When my hands touch the marble or the granite or the wood, When my hands deepen in soft clay, I touch God's hands. God's hands are there waiting for me. I feel them, I try to see, I try to listen… This is how, resculpting His sculptures, I tie myself, day by day, to the Universe. This is how, resculpting His sculptures, I understand, day by day, how inadequate I am. I am a sculptor, I am a sculpture. I call myself in the way I was named: Liviu Mocan."
