= BTarena =

Sports venue in Cluj-Napoca, Romania

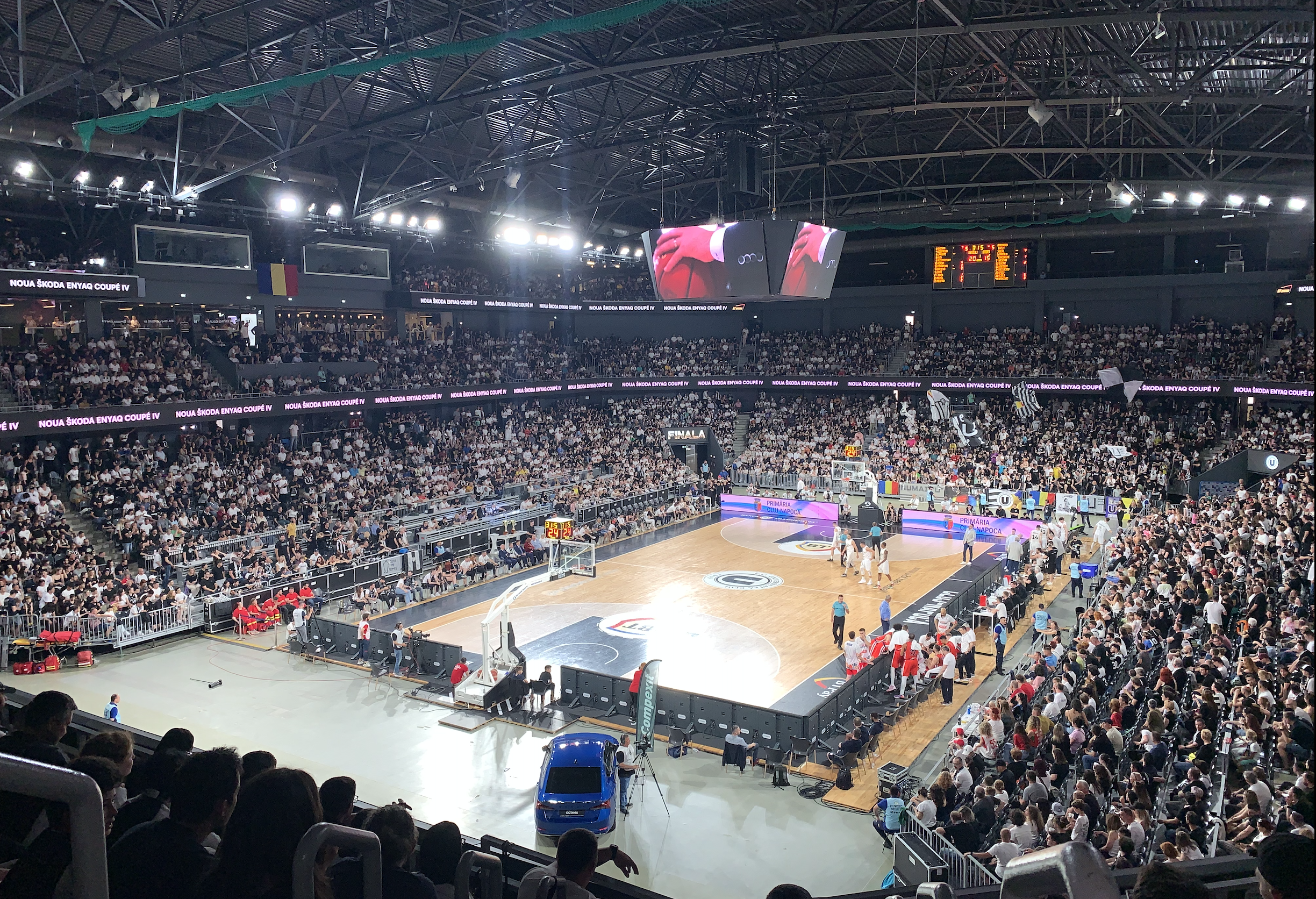
- The arena during basketball game in 2023
- Interactive map of BTarena
- Former names: Polyvalent Hall (2014–2017)
- Location: Cluj-Napoca, Romania
- Coordinates: 46°46′1.1″N 23°34′13.4″E
- Operator: Cluj-Napoca City Council
- Capacity: 10,000 (tennis, basketball, handball); 10,000 (concerts, kickboxing, MMA)

Construction
- Opened: 21 October 2014
- Expanded: 2017
- Cost: €16.5 million + €3.5 million(2017 renovation) (€21.5 million in 2019 euros)
- Architect: Dico și Țigănaș
- Structural engineer: Plan 31
- General contractor: SC CON-A SA
- Main contractors: Nisal; Intersport

Tenants
- U-BT Cluj-Napoca (Divizia A); Universitatea Cluj-Napoca (Liga Naţională)

Website
- btarena.info

The BTarena is a multi-purpose indoor arena that is located in Cluj-Napoca, Romania. The arena was previously called the Polyvalent Hall but was renamed on 17 October 2017 when the facility entered into a new arena-naming rights agreement with Banca Transilvania. The venue holds 10,000 people in its largest configuration. The building is located next to the Cluj Arena.

== History ==
The arena opened on 21 October 2014. The arena hosted a concert, on 31 October 2014, by English musician James Blunt, who sang from his album Moon Landing. The concert had an attendance of upwards of 6,000.

It hosted the Counter-Strike: Global Offensive Major DreamHack Open Cluj-Napoca 2015.

The arena's seating capacity for basketball games was expanded to 10,000 seats for the EuroBasket 2017. The renovation work on the arena's existing stands began after the 2017 European Artistic Gymnastics Championships. It was used again as one of the two venues for the 2020 FIBA Under-17 Women's Basketball World Cup.

It hosted the 2023 Junior World Rhythmic Gymnastics Championships from July 7 to 9.

It hosted the Counter-Strike 2 tournament PGL Cluj-Napoca 2025.

It will be used for the main round of the 2026 European Women's Handball Championship.

It will also host preliminary round matches of the 2026 Men's European Volleyball Championship.

== See also ==
- List of indoor arenas in Romania
- List of indoor arenas by capacity
