= Liberty Center (Bucharest) =

Liberty Center Mall
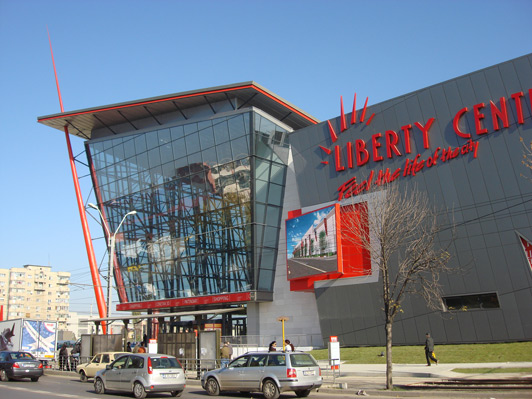
- Location: Bucharest, Romania
- Coordinates: 44°24′55″N 26°04′48″E
- Opened: 31 October 2008; 18 years ago (as Liberty Center); November 2024; 2 years ago (as Jumbo Mall)
- Closed: 2023 (as Liberty Center)
- Developer: Mivan
- Owner: Mivan
- Architect: Dico și Țigănaș
- Num. of stores: 100
- Floor area: 25,000 square metres (269,098 sq ft)
- Floors: 3
- Parking: 700 underground

Liberty Center Mall was the fifth shopping mall in Bucharest, Romania. Opened in 2008, the construction site was an uncompleted hunger circus abandoned after the fall of the Communist system.

Liberty Center Mall featured a 3D Cinema and an indoor ice rink. It was located on 151-171 Progresului Road near the intersection with Rahova street.

In 2023, the Greek store retailer Jumbo S.A. acquired the shopping center, with plans to open a Jumbo store on its 2nd floor. In the autumn of the same year, the shopping center was closed for renovations, and was inaugurated, under the name of Jumbo Mall, in November 2024.
