= Gruia, Cluj-Napoca =

Gruia Fellegvár (Hungarian)
- District of Cluj-Napoca
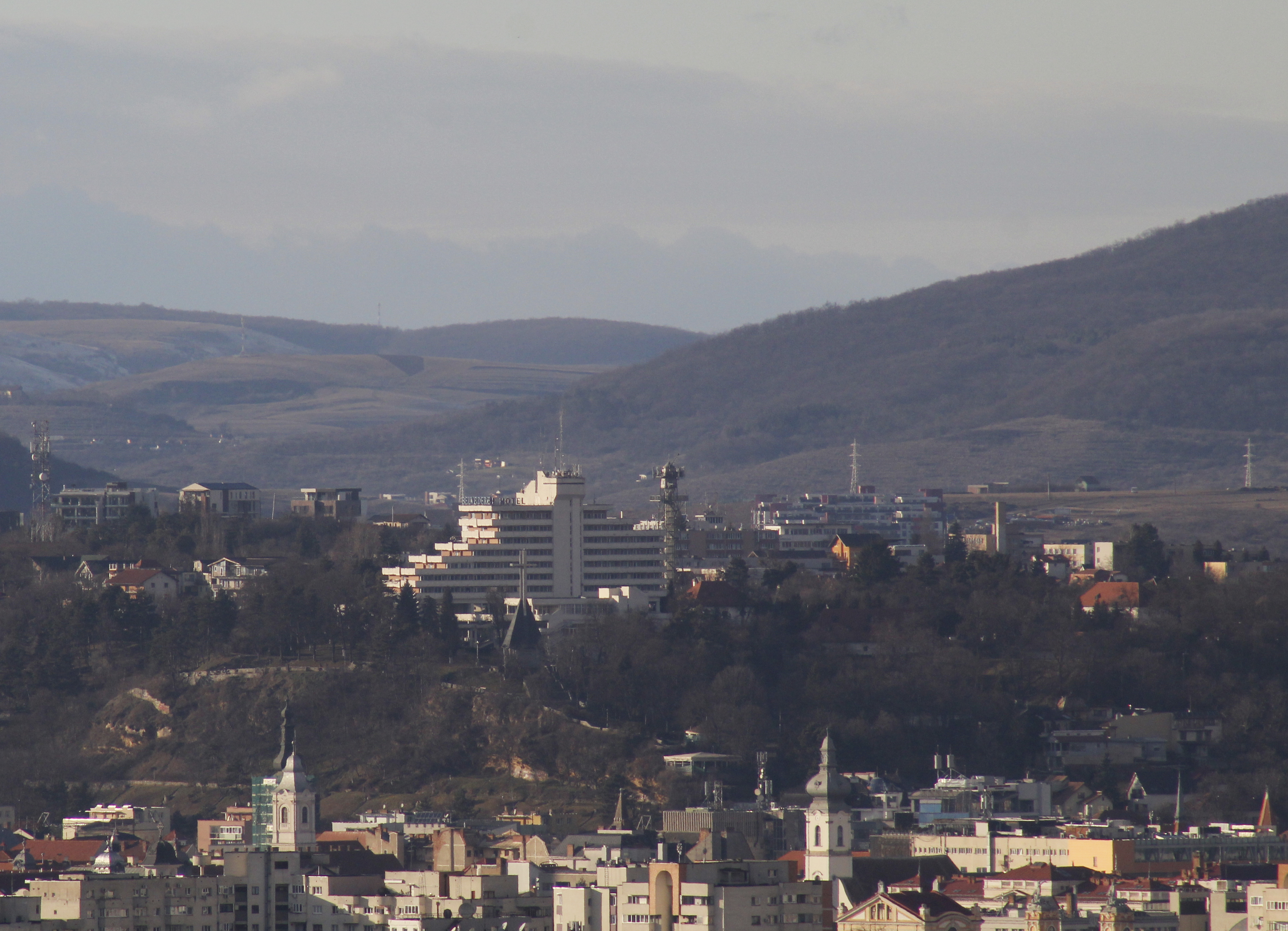
- View of the Gruia District
- Interactive map of Gruia
- Coordinates: 46°46′38″N 23°34′36″E
- Country: Romania
- County: Cluj
- City: Cluj-Napoca
- Established: 1880

Gruia (Fellegvár) is a district to the north-west of the center of Cluj-Napoca in Romania. The area was named after Romanian hajduk Gruia Novac in 1923.

== Geography ==
The district is positioned on a prominent hill to the north of the historical center. The southern incline of this elevation, descending towards the center, is characterized by a steep gradient, accentuated by the presence of cliffs. Conversely, the northern aspect of the hill exhibits a more gradual slope, gently descending towards the Nadăș River. To the west, the district is demarcated by the imposing Tăietura Turcului (Törökvágás) hill pass.

== History ==
The hill on which the district is situated was historically known as Kőmál among the Hungarian-speaking population. Located on the outskirts of the town, its prominent southern slope was used for centuries for viticulture and fruit cultivation. The first recorded permanent establishment on the hill was on its northeastern side, where, in 1587, the local organization of the Kalands Brethren established a cemetery for the farming population living outside the city walls. The first large-scale construction on the hill took place during the early years of the Principality of Transylvania under Habsburg rule. As part of efforts to consolidate power in Transylvania, Austrian authorities built a series of fortifications, including one on Kőmál Hill. Constructed in multiple phases between 1715 and 1735, the citadel led to the area being referred to as Fellegvár in Hungarian and Cetățuie in Romanian, both meaning "citadel."

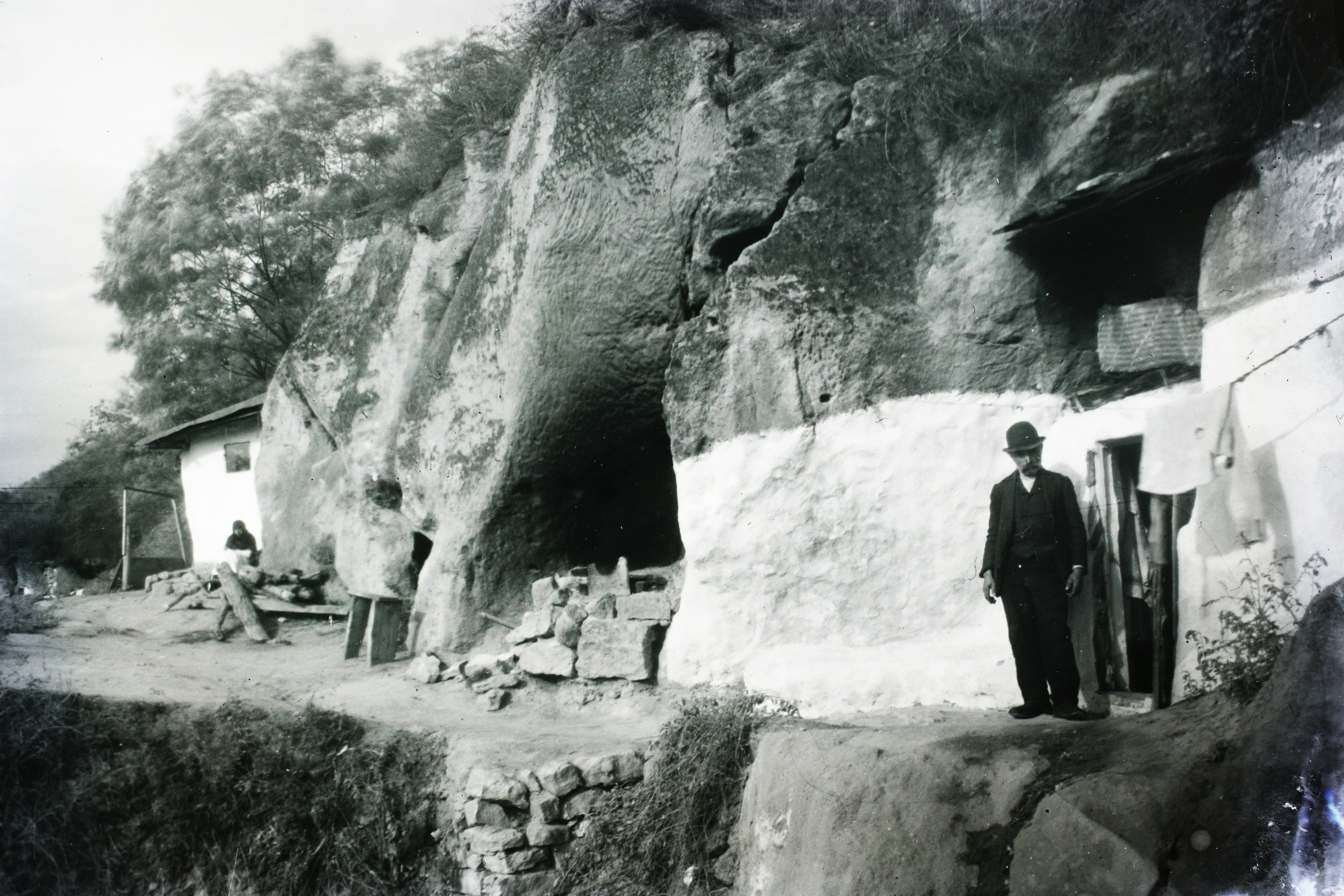
Cave-dwellings in Sáncalja, 1908

Beginning in the 19th century, impoverished families settled near the stairs leading up to the fort, as well as on the cliffs of the southern slope. This area, known as Sáncalja (Hungarian for "Below the Trenches"), became one of the town’s slums, with some dwellings carved directly into the rock face.

By the 19th century, the foundations of the district's modern road network were already in place. The road leading to Baciu served as the predecessor of today's Strada Emil Racoviță, while the road leading up to the citadel evolved into Strada Mecanicilor and Strada Cetății. At that time, only the lower sections of the latter featured a few buildings.

With the town’s connection to the railway network and the onset of industrialization, urban expansion gradually extended onto the hill. The first major housing development in the district took place in the 1880s and was led by Hungarian historian Kőváry László, who divided his 50,000 m² estate into 100 parcels and sold them to railway workers at advantageous prices. In many cases, he provided interest-free loans to assist buyers in building houses. The main road of this area continues to bear his name. In 1902, the town administration was already busy making plans to reorganize the slums on the southern slopes of Citadel Hill. As part of this effort, they commissioned the construction of a modern pedestrian bridge with a metallic frame, along with a winding promenade leading to the hilltop. The project was completed with the installation of a bust of Empress Elisabeth of Austria, who had been recently assassinated. The entire complex was named in her honor.

In the final years before World War I, the road connecting the city center to Baciu underwent significant development. Traditional vineyards gave way to luxurious and fashionable villas, many showcasing elements of the Vienna Secession style. The dirt road was paved and renamed Erzsébet út, also in honor of Empress Elisabeth. Over time, it became home to several prominent figures in Cluj’s intellectual and cultural circles, including Emil Racoviță, Sextil Pușcariu and János Spáda.

After the Union of Transylvania with Romania, the modern road network of the district began to take shape. With the establishment of the new Romanian administration, the area was officially named Gruia. In the early 1920s, a sanatorium was built on the outskirts of the urbanized area to treat pulmonary ailments. Meanwhile, as farmland was gradually sold off to accommodate new families, the road network continued to expand. The intersection of the district’s two original roads, located near the top of the slope facing the city center, became a key point for further development. Over time, as additional streets branched out, this junction evolved into an intersection of seven roads.

By the time of the Second Vienna Award, much of the district’s present-day road network had already been established. By this period, a significant portion of the previously empty plots of land had been developed, with residential buildings housing both farmers and industrial workers. On June 2, 1944, the Allied bombing of Kolozsvár, which targeted the train station and railway infrastructure, caused extensive damage to the district due to its close proximity to the targets. Dozens of buildings were permanently destroyed, particularly in the vicinity of Kőváry László Street and extending up the northern slope to the intersection with seven roads.

After World War II, during the period of the Romanian People’s Republic, war-damaged buildings were either rebuilt or replaced, while the last remaining vacant plots were gradually developed with residential housing. One of the most notable structures from this era was constructed in 1952—the parachute tower just west of the Citadel. It was also during this period, when the statue of Empress Elisabeth was vandalized and removed by the authorities. By 1962, the slums on the southern slopes were finally dismantled. Following slope stabilization efforts, five modern apartment buildings were constructed in their place.

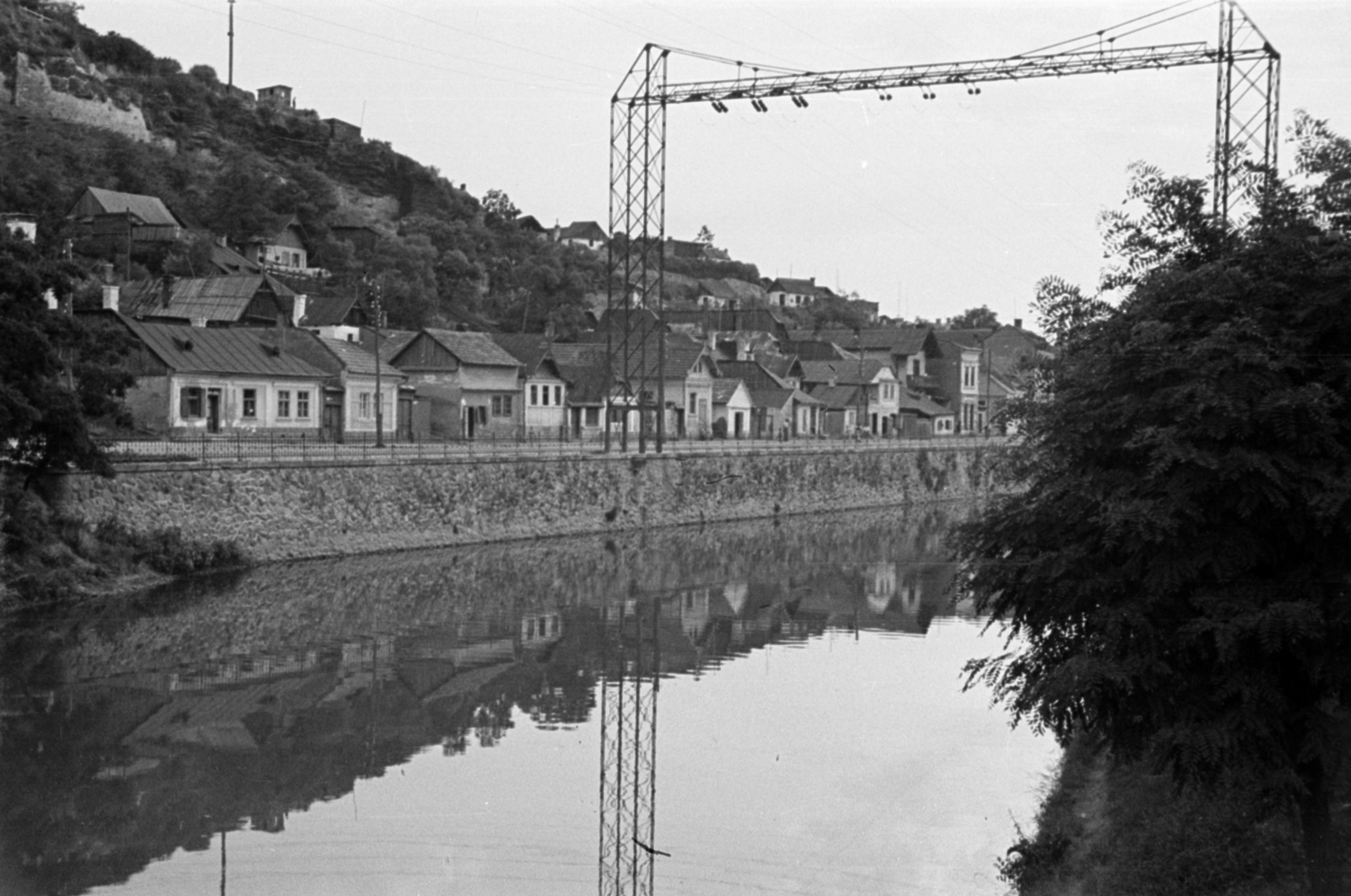
The slums on the southern slope, 1942

During the period of the Socialist Republic of Romania, the district saw more substantial development. The Dr. Constantin Rădulescu Stadium was inaugurated in 1973, marking a significant addition to the area. In 1977, one of the most prominent structures in the district, Hotel Belvedere, was built in the heart of the Citadel, significantly altering the historical site.

== Description ==
Unlike many districts of Cluj-Napoca, Gruia remains predominantly a residential area characterized by individual homes. Socialist-style apartment buildings are limited to a small section at the end of Strada Gruia. Despite the bombings during World War II, most of the district’s historic buildings have been preserved, including the pre-World War I villas along Strada Emil Racoviță, which remain largely intact. In addition to its residential character, Gruia is home to several notable institutions. The Belvedere Hotel, which now also houses the Cluj-Napoca branch of Mathias Corvinus Collegium, and the Dr. Constantin Rădulescu Stadium, home to CFR Cluj, are among the most prominent landmarks. The district is also home to the Kozmutza Flóra Special School for the Hearing Impaired, which functions in the compound of the former sanatorium, and a cemetery. The area surrounding Hotel Belvedere and the Citadel serves as a popular recreational space, offering panoramic views of the city.
