= János Spáda =

Hungarian architect (1877–1913)

Spáda János
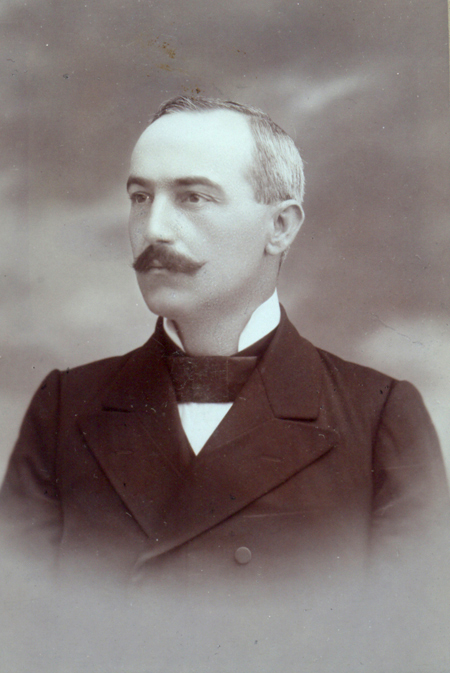
- Spáda János (1877-1913)
- Born: Spáda János; 10 December 1877; Kolozs, Austria-Hungary (today Cojocna, Romania)
- Died: 7 July 1913; Kolozsvár, Austria-Hungary (today Cluj-Napoca, Romania)
- Occupation: Architect
- Children: 3

János Spáda (also known as John Spada, December 10, 1877, Kolozs – July 7, 1913, Kolozsvár) was a famous Hungarian architect of Italian descent, the grandfather of Hungarian mathematician from Transylvania Béla Orbán and fencer, mathematician and physics professor László Orbán.

== Life ==
Born in Kolozs, Austria-Hungary (today Cojocna, Romania), on the estate of his Italian father, Domokos Spáda. Around the beginning of the 20th century, he opened an architecture office on the main square of Kolozsvár (today Cluj-Napoca, Romania) where he undertook a diverse variety of activities.

He implemented a number of well known buildings in Kolozsvár. He built a two-storey rental building for his own use, which was referred to as the "Spáda-palace". He also plotted and built houses near the top of the Erzsébet St. He built the house at 51. Erzsébet St. for himself and his family.

He died young, in 1913 as a result of a lung infection. He was survived by his three children. Many of his works were finished by his good friend, Mihály Rátz. Mihály Rátz married Spáda's widower after he came back from the front in 1918, and lived together until her death in 1952.

Spáda also contributed to social life. He was member of the municipal committee, Kolozsvár Chamber of Commerce, Industry Board, Artisan's Guilds, and the Caucus of the Roman Catholic Parish. At one time, he was president of the Artisan's Guild.

He now lies in the Házsongárd cemetery among other family members.

== Famous buildings ==
- Designed by Felner and Helmer, executed by János Spáda, the National Theatre (1904 - 1906)
- Designed by Jenő Hübner, implemented by János Spáda, the Marianum in Cluj (1911)
- Based on Károly Kós designs, the Monostor Reformed Church
- The Roman Catholic High-school in Székelyudvarhely

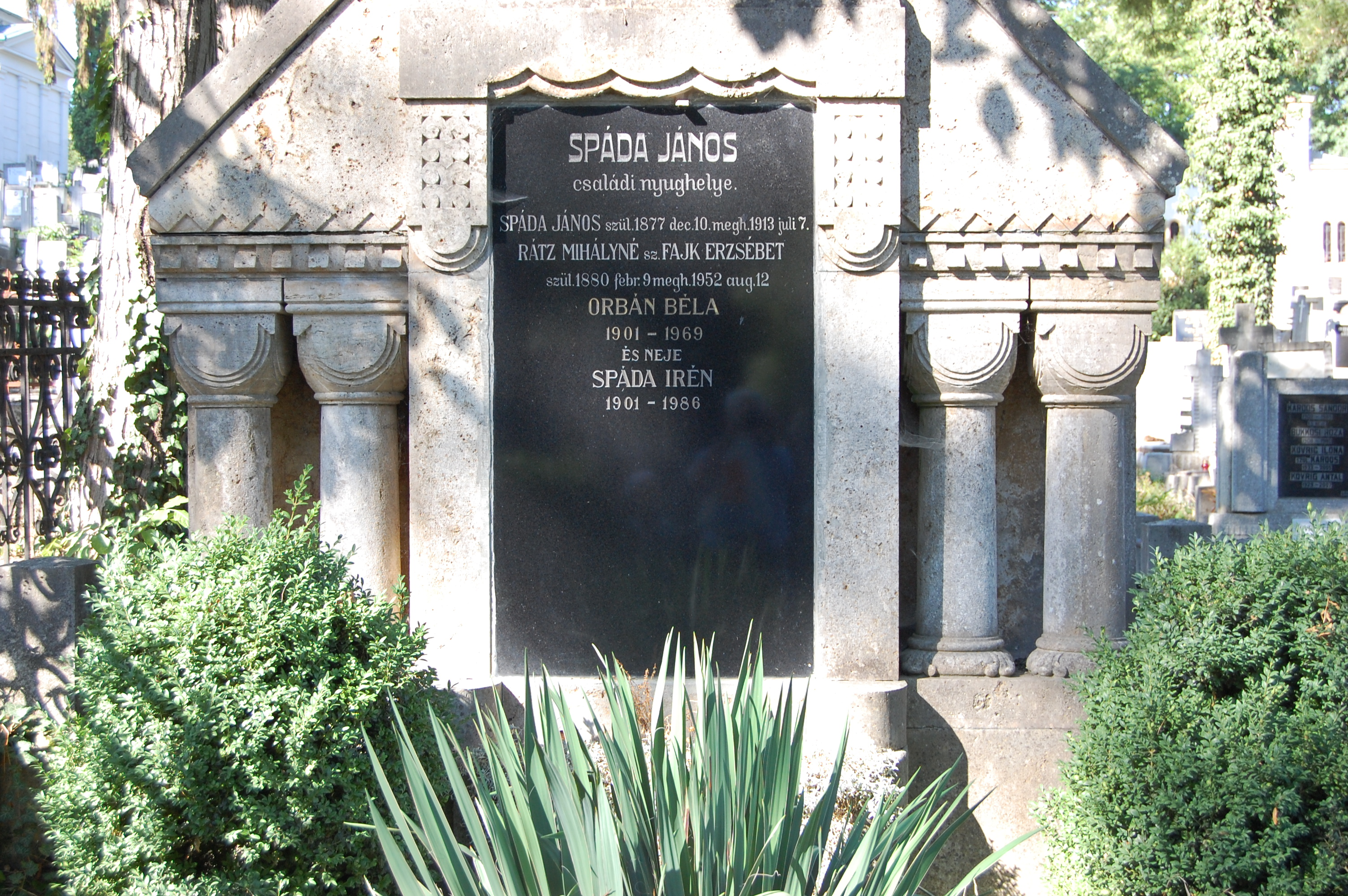
The tombstone of János Spáda
