= László Orbán (fencer) =

Romanian fencer

László I. Orbán
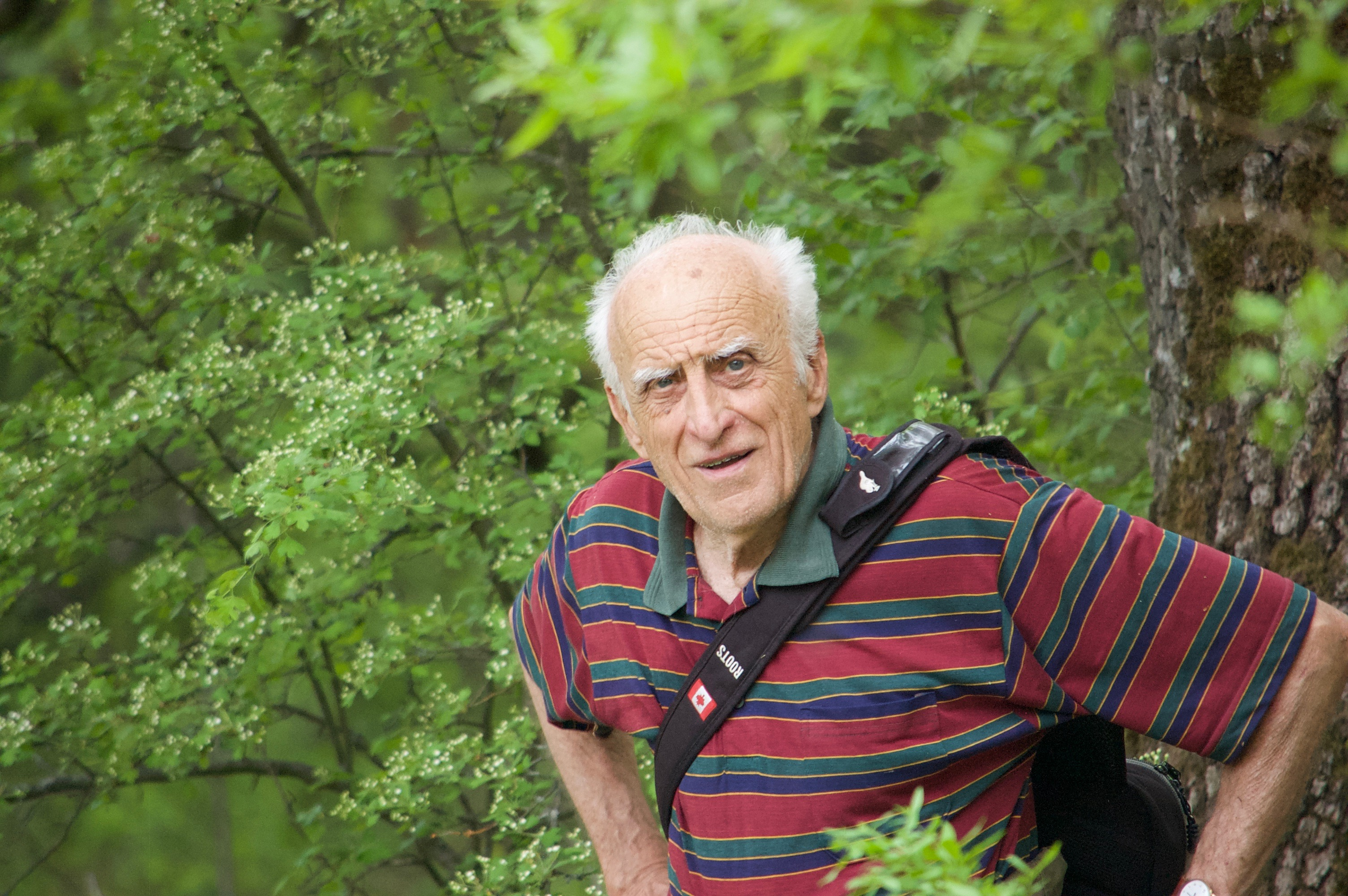
- László Orbán in 2013 (age 83)

Personal information
- Nationality: Hungarian, Romanian
- Born: 17 April 1930 Cluj, Romania
- Died: May 31, 2018 (aged 88) Balatonfűzfő, Hungary
- Website: orbanthinking.com

Sport
- Sport: Fencing, Pentathlon
- Club: Tudomány, Dinamó, Haladás
- Coached by: Lajos Ozoray-Schenker

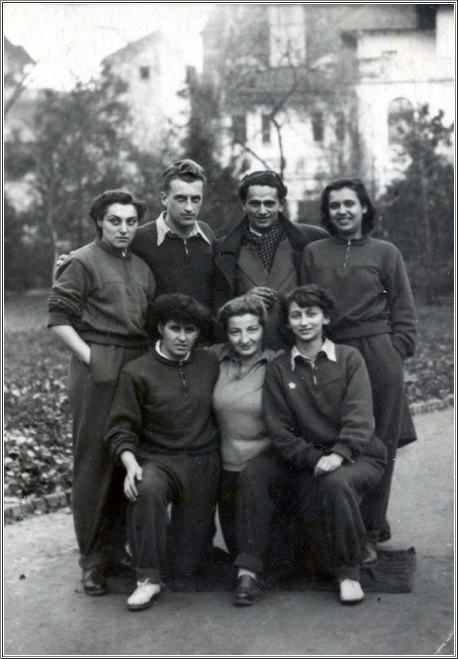
Kneeling (from left): Júlia Zágoni, Danilia, Márta Telegdi. Standing (from left): Lizi Szaniszló, László Orbán, Florian Potra, Kató Orb

László István Orbán (born April 17, 1930, in Cluj, died May 31, 2018, in Balatonfűzfő) is one of the most significant fencers of the 1950s, 1960s and 1970s in Cluj who performed in national championships. Orbán raised the quality of the sport after the second world war and met challenges from much better supported and advantaged fencers from Bucharest. His grandfather was János Spáda, a famous architect in Kolozsvár (today Cluj-Napoca, Romania), and his cousin, Prof. Béla Orbán, a mathematician in the same city, all of them ethnic Hungarians.
