= 2011–12 FC Oțelul Galați season =

FC Oțelul Galați
2011–12 season
- Chairman: Marius Stan
- Manager: Dorinel Munteanu
- Liga I: 6th
- Cupa României: Quarter-finals
- Supercupa României: Winners
- UEFA Champions League: Group stage
- Top goalscorer: League: Didi (8); All: Didi (8)

The 2011–12 season was Oțelul Galați's 20th consecutive season in the Liga I and their 23rd overall season in the top-flight of Romanian football. This season was the first in their history in which they took part in the UEFA Champions League.

== Overview ==
The previous season of Liga I ended on May 21 and the players went on vacation. The players are set to return to training on June 10.

== Players ==
=== Squad information ===
| N | Pos. | Nat. | Name | Age | EU | Since | App | Goals | Ends | Transfer fee | Notes |
|---|---|---|---|---|---|---|---|---|---|---|---|
| 8 | MF | (Romania) | Antal | 21 | EU | 2009 | 53 | 12 | 2014 | Free | |

- Last updated: 5 June 2011
- Source: Otelul-Galati.ro

=== Transfers ===
==== In ====
| No. | Pos. | Nat. | Name | Age | EU | Moving from | Type | Transfer window | Ends | Transfer fee | Source |
|---|---|---|---|---|---|---|---|---|---|---|---|
| 11 | LM | (Romania) | Frunză | 33 | EU | Rapid București | Transfer | Summer | 2012 | Free | |
| 6 | CM | (Romania) | Benga | 21 | EU | Petrolul Ploiești | Transfer | Summer | Undisclosed | Free | |
| 5 | CB | (Serbia) | Ljubinković | 28 | Non-EU | Petrolul Ploiești | Transfer | Summer | Undisclosed | Free | |
| 21 | FW | (Peru) | Daniel Chávez | 23 | Non-EU | Westerlo (Belgium) | Transfer | Summer | 2012 | Free | |
| | CM | (Romania) | Iacob | 22 | EU | Victoria Brănești | Transfer | Summer | 2015 | Free | |
| | CM | (Romania) | Novac | 23 | EU | Victoria Brănești | Transfer | Summer | 2015 | Free | |
| 2 | RB | (Slovenia) | Skubič | 22 | EU | Interblock (Slovenia) | Transfer | Summer | Undisclosed | Undisclosed | |
| | GK | (Czech Republic) | Buchta | 31 | EU | Gaz Metan Mediaș | Loan in | Summer | 2012 | Undisclosed | |
| 2 | FW | (Brazil) | Didi | 29 | Non-EU | FCM Târgu Mureș | Transfer | Winter | 2014 | € 50,000 | |
| 15 | FW | (Slovenia) | Štromajer | 28 | EU | Pandurii Târgu Jiu | Transfer | Winter | 2014 | € 200,000 | |
| | GK | (Lithuania) | Simaitis | 21 | EU | Šiauliai (Lithuania) | Transfer | Winter | 2015 | € 60,000 | |
| | MF | (Romania) | Enescu | 24 | EU | Petrolul Ploiești | Transfer | Winter | 2012 | Free | |

==== Out ====
| No. | Pos. | Nat. | Name | Age | EU | Moving to | Type | Transfer window | Transfer fee | Source |
|---|---|---|---|---|---|---|---|---|---|---|
| 32 | FW | (Romania) | Borbély | 30 | EU | | Contract expired | Summer | – | |
| 31 | CB | (Bosnia and Herzegovina) | Šipović | 20 | Non-EU | Petrolul Ploiești | Loan out | Summer | – | |
| 9 | CM | (Romania) | Milea | 26 | EU | Petrolul Ploiești | Loan out | Summer | – | |
| 5 | RB | (Romania) | Petean | 23 | EU | Petrolul Ploiești | Loan out | Summer | – | |
| | FW | (Romania) | Elek | 23 | EU | | Released | Summer | – | |
| 31 | CB | (Bosnia and Herzegovina) | Šipović | 21 | Non-EU | Farul Constanța | Loan out | Winter | – | |
| 15 | MF | (Nigeria) | Ibeh | 25 | Non-EU | Pandurii Târgu Jiu | Released | Winter | Undisclosed | |

EU = if holds or not a European Union passport; Country: when 2 flags, 1st flag = country that plays for internationally, 2nd flag = country of birth; N = number on jersey; P = Position (for position name, pause mouse pointer on abbreviation); Name = Name on jersey (for more extensive name, pause mouse pointer on name); Age = age on the day of the signing; Moving from = only indicate the club the player was playing before start playing for this club in this season, for the type of the moving see Status column; Moving to = only indicates the club the player is going to play next, for the type of the moving see Status column; Ends = when the player's current contract ends; n/a = Not applicable.

== Player statistics ==
=== Squad statistics ===
| | | | | Total | | | Liga I | | Cupa României | | UEFA Champions League | | Others^{1} | |
| No. | Pos. | Nat. | Name | Sts | App | Gls | App | Gls | App | Gls | App | Gls | App | Gls |
|---|---|---|---|---|---|---|---|---|---|---|---|---|---|---|
| 8 | RM | (Romania) | Antal | 30 | 40 | 7 | 30 | 4 | 3 | 2 | 6 | 1 | 1 | |
| 6 | CB | (Romania) | Benga | 3 | 3 | | 1 | | 1 | | 1 | | | |
| 1 | GK | (Romania) | Brăneţ | 10 | 10 | | 9 | | 1 | | | | | |
| 17 | LM | (Romania) | Buş | 12 | 18 | 1 | 16 | | | | 1 | | 1 | 1 |
| 20 | FW | (Romania) | Butoi | | 1 | | | | 1 | | | | | |
| 21 | AM | (Peru) | Chávez | 1 | 1 | | | | 1 | | | | | |
| 20 | RB | (Romania) | Cojoc | 1 | 2 | | 2 | | | | | | | |
| 18 | CB | (Romania) | Costin | 32 | 32 | 2 | 27 | 2 | | | 4 | | 1 | |
| 2 | FW | (Brazil) | Didi | 13 | 15 | 8 | 14 | 8 | 1 | | | | | |
| 4 | DM | (Romania) | Filip | 34 | 36 | 2 | 29 | 2 | 1 | | 6 | | | |
| 11 | LM | (Romania) | Frunză | 9 | 21 | | 14 | | 2 | | 5 | | | |
| 29 | DM | (Romania) | Giurgiu | 37 | 37 | 2 | 28 | 1 | 2 | | 6 | 1 | 1 | |
| 12 | GK | (Serbia) | Grahovac | 34 | 34 | | 25 | | 2 | | 6 | | 1 | |
| 15 | AM | (Nigeria) | Ibeh | 11 | 12 | | 9 | | | | 2 | | 1 | |
| 14 | LM | (Romania) | Ilie | 17 | 22 | | 16 | | 1 | | 5 | | | |
| 7 | RM | (Romania) | Iorga | 22 | 32 | 7 | 26 | 5 | 3 | 2 | 3 | | | |
| 5 | LB | (Serbia) | Ljubinković | 8 | 11 | | 8 | | 1 | | 2 | | | |
| 26 | DM | (Romania) | Neagu | 27 | 31 | | 23 | | 3 | | 4 | | 1 | |
| 10 | AM | (Romania) | Paraschiv | 9 | 30 | 3 | 23 | 2 | 2 | 1 | 4 | | 1 | |
| 27 | ST | (Romania) | Pena | 25 | 39 | 5 | 30 | 4 | 2 | | 6 | 1 | 1 | |
| 55 | CB | (Serbia) | Perendija | 34 | 34 | 1 | 26 | 1 | 2 | | 5 | | 1 | |
| 19 | FW | (Serbia) | Punoševac | 11 | 24 | 5 | 20 | 3 | 2 | 2 | 2 | | | |
| 3 | RB | (Romania) | Râpă | 38 | 38 | | 30 | | 2 | | 5 | | 1 | |
| 23 | LB | (Romania) | Sălăgeanu | 28 | 29 | | 22 | | 2 | | 4 | | 1 | |
| 16 | CB | (Romania) | Sârghi | 17 | 19 | 2 | 13 | 2 | 3 | | 2 | | 1 | |
| 2 | RB | (Slovenia) | Skubič | 4 | 4 | | 2 | | 1 | | 1 | | | |
| 15 | FW | (Slovenia) | Štromajer | 9 | 16 | | 15 | | 1 | | | | | |
| 37 | AM | (Argentina) | Viglianti | 8 | 24 | | 17 | | 2 | | 4 | | 1 | |

Last updated: 20 May 2012
Source: official website and Viaţa Liberă
Ordered by player name
0 shown as blank

=== Disciplinary records ===
| N | Pos. | Nat. | Name | Yellow card | Second yellow card | Red card | Notes |
|---|---|---|---|---|---|---|---|
| 8 | RM | (Romania) | Antal | 8 | 1 | | |
| 17 | LM | (Romania) | Buş | 4 | | | |
| 1 | GK | (Romania) | Brăneţ | 1 | | | |
| 18 | CB | (Romania) | Costin | 6 | | | |
| 4 | DM | (Romania) | Filip | 4 | | | |
| 11 | LM | (Romania) | Frunză | 2 | | | |
| 2 | AM | (Brazil) | Didi | 4 | | | |
| 29 | DM | (Romania) | Giurgiu | 8 | | | |
| 12 | GK | (Bosnia and Herzegovina) | Grahovac | 5 | | | |
| 14 | LM | (Romania) | Ilie | 4 | | 2 | |
| 7 | RM | (Romania) | Iorga | 3 | 1 | | |
| 5 | LB | (Serbia) | Ljubinković | 3 | | | |
| 26 | DM | (Romania) | Neagu | 9 | 1 | | |
| 10 | AM | (Romania) | Paraschiv | 6 | | | |
| 55 | CB | (Serbia) | Perendija | 13 | 1 | | |
| 27 | FW | (Romania) | Pena | 4 | | | |
| 19 | FW | (Serbia) | Punoševac | 4 | 1 | | |
| 3 | RB | (Romania) | Râpă | 12 | | | |
| 23 | LB | (Romania) | Sălăgeanu | 7 | | 1 | |
| 16 | CB | (Romania) | Sârghi | 9 | 1 | | |
| 2 | RB | (Slovenia) | Skubič | 1 | | | |
| 37 | AM | (Argentina) | Viglianti | 1 | | | |

Last updated: 20 May 2012
Source: Matches
Only competitive matches
(yellow card) = Number of bookings; (second yellow card) = Number of sending offs after a second yellow card; (red card) = Number of sending offs by a direct red card.

==== Suspensions ====
| No. | P | Name | Matches; Banned | Reason for Suspension | Notes | Source |
| 19 | FW | Punoševac | League:#2 | Sent off | Suspension received after two yellow cards against Petrolul Ploieşti | |
| 8 | RM | Antal | L:2 | Sent off | Suspension received after two yellow cards against Petrolul Ploieşti | |
| 30 | CB | Perendija | L:6 | Cumulative yellows | Suspension received after collecting his 4th yellow card of the season against Dinamo | |
| 14 | LM | Ilie | L:7, C:1, L:8 | Sent off | Suspension received after a straight red card against CFR Cluj | |
| 23 | LB | Sălăgeanu | UCL:2 | Sent off | Suspension received after a straight red card against FC Basel | |
| 30 | CB | Perendija | L:11 | Cumulative yellows | Suspension received after collecting his 7th yellow card of the season against Astra | |
| 26 | DM | Neagu | L:12 | Sent off | Suspension received after two yellow cards against FCM Târgu Mureș | |
| 30 | CB | Perendija | UCL:4 | Sent off | Suspension received after two yellow cards against Man United | |
| 18 | CB | Costin | UCL:5 | Cumulative yellows | Suspension received after collecting his 3rd yellow card of the season against Man Utd | |
| 16 | CB | Sârghi | L:14 | Cumulative yellows | Suspension received after collecting his 4th yellow card of the season against Pandurii | |
| 26 | DM | Neagu | L:16 | Cumulative yellows | Suspension received after collecting his 4th yellow card of the season against U. Cluj | |
| 23 | LB | Sălăgeanu | L:19 | Cumulative yellows | Suspension received after collecting his 4th yellow card of the season against Petrolul Ploieşti | |
| 29 | DM | Giurgiu | L:20 | Cumulative yellows | Suspension received after collecting his 4th yellow card of the season against Concordia | |
| 14 | LM | Ilie | L:20, C:3, L:21 | Sent off | Suspension received after a straight red card against Concordia | |
| 30 | CB | Perendija | L:21 | Cumulative yellows | Suspension received after collecting his 9th yellow card of the season against Ceahlăul | |
| 3 | RB | Râpă | L:23 | Cumulative yellows | Suspension received after collecting his 4th yellow card of the season against Dinamo | |
| 2 | MF | Didi | L:24 | Cumulative yellows | Suspension received after collecting his 4th yellow card of the season against CFR Cluj | |
| 30 | CB | Perendija | L:28 | Cumulative yellows | Suspension received after collecting his 10th yellow card of the season against Astra Ploiești | |
| 4 | DM | Filip | L:28 | Cumulative yellows | Suspension received after collecting his 4th yellow card of the season against Astra Ploiești | |
| 7 | RM | Iorga | L:29 | Sent off | Suspension received after two yellow cards against FCM Târgu Mureș | |
| 16 | CB | Sârghi | L:30 | Sent off | Suspension received after two yellow cards against Gaz Metan | |
| 27 | FW | Pena | L:33 | Cumulative yellows | Suspension received after collecting his 4th yellow card of the season against U Cluj | |
| 17 | LM | Buş | L:34 | Cumulative yellows | Suspension received after collecting his 4th yellow card of the season against FC Vaslui | |
| 30 | CB | Perendija | L:34 | Cumulative yellows | Suspension received after collecting his 11th yellow card of the season against FC Vaslui | |
| 3 | RB | Râpă | L:34 | Cumulative yellows | Suspension received after collecting his 7th yellow card of the season against FC Vaslui | |

== Club ==
=== Coaching staff ===
| Position | Staff |
|---|---|
| Head coach | (Romania) Dorinel Munteanu |
| Assistant coach 1 | (Romania) Ion Balaur |
| Assistant coach 2 | (Romania) Catălin Ciorman |
| Fitness coach | (Romania) Ionel Tămăşanu |
| Goalkeepers coach | (Romania) Tudorel Călugăru |

Last updated: 5 June 2011
Source: Otelul-Galati.ro

=== Kit ===
Supplier: Masita
Sponsor(s): ArcelorMittal

| Home | Away |

Source: "FOTO Echipamentul!". Otelul-Galati.ro.

== Competitions ==
=== Overall ===
| | Total | Home | Away | Neutral |
|---|---|---|---|---|
| Games played | 44 | 23 | 20 | 1 |
| Games won | 18 | 10 | 7 | 1 |
| Games drawn | 7 | 6 | 1 | – |
| Games lost | 19 | 7 | 12 | – |
| Biggest win | 3–0 vs Voința Sibiu | 3–0 vs Voința Sibiu | 2–0 vs Ceahlăul | 1–0 vs Steaua |
| Biggest loss | 0–4 vs CFR Cluj | 0–4 vs CFR Cluj | 0–2 vs Man Utd | – |
| Clean sheets | 17 | 11 | 5 | 1 |
| Goals scored | 45 | 26 | 18 | 1 |
| Goals conceded | 45 | 22 | 23 | 0 |
| Goal difference | 0 | +4 | -5 | +1 |
| Average GF per game | 1.02 | 1.13 | 0.9 | 1 |
| Average GA per game | 1.02 | 0.96 | 1.15 | 0 |
| Yellow cards | 118 | 57 | 57 | 4 |
| Red cards | 9 | 4 | 5 | – |
| Most appearances | (Romania) Antal (40) | | | |
| Most minutes played | (Romania) Râpă (3,541) | | | |
| Top scorer | (Brazil) Didi (8) | | | |
| Top assister | (Romania) Antal (6) | | | |
| Points | 62/132 (46.97%) | 36/69(52.17%) | 22/60(36.67%) | 3/3(100%) |
| Winning rate | 40.91% | 43.48% | 35% | 100% |

Last updated: 20 May 2012
Source: Matches

=== Liga I ===
==== League table ====
| Pos | Team | Pld | W | D | L | GF | GA | GD | Pts | Qualification or relegation |
|---|---|---|---|---|---|---|---|---|---|---|
| 4 | Rapid București | 34 | 18 | 10 | 6 | 54 | 29 | +25 | 64 | Qualification to Europa League second qualifying round |
| 5 | Dinamo București | 34 | 18 | 8 | 8 | 57 | 32 | +25 | 62 | Qualification to Europa League play-off round (Note: Dinamo București won the 2011–12 Cupa României so it qualified for the 2012–13 UEFA Europa League play-off round.) |
| 6 | Oțelul Galați | 34 | 15 | 7 | 12 | 34 | 29 | +5 | 52 | |
| 7 | Pandurii Târgu Jiu | 34 | 12 | 11 | 11 | 47 | 40 | +7 | 47 (Note: PAN 1–0 UCL; UCL 0–1 PAN) | |
| 8 | Universitatea Cluj | 34 | 11 | 14 | 9 | 46 | 37 | +9 | 47 | |

Source: LPF (in Romanian)
Rules for classification: 1st points; 2nd overall goals difference; 3rd overall goals scored (until the end of the season)

==== Results summary ====
| Overall | | | | | | | | Home | | | | | | Away | | | | | |
| Pld | W | D | L | GF | GA | GD | Pts | W | D | L | GF | GA | GD | W | D | L | GF | GA | GD |
|---|---|---|---|---|---|---|---|---|---|---|---|---|---|---|---|---|---|---|---|
| 34 | 15 | 7 | 12 | 34 | 29 | +5 | 52 | 8 | 6 | 3 | 17 | 11 | +6 | 7 | 1 | 9 | 17 | 18 | −1 |

Last updated: 20 May 2012.
Source: Matches

==== Results by round ====
| Round | 1 | 2 | 3 | 4 | 5 | 6 | 7 | 8 | 9 | 10 | 11 | 12 | 13 | 14 | 15 | 16 | 17 | 18 | 19 | 20 | 21 | 22 | 23 | 24 | 25 | 26 | 27 | 28 | 29 | 30 | 31 | 32 | 33 | 34 |
|---|---|---|---|---|---|---|---|---|---|---|---|---|---|---|---|---|---|---|---|---|---|---|---|---|---|---|---|---|---|---|---|---|---|---|
| Ground | A | H | A | H | A | H | A | H | A | H | A | H | A | H | A | A | H | H | A | H | A | H | A | H | A | H | A | H | A | H | A | H | H | A |
| Result | L | D | W | W | L | L | W | D | L | D | W | W | W | W | D | L | W | W | L | D | W | D | L | W | W | L | L | D | L | W | W | W | L | L |
| Position | 12 | 12 | 8 | 5 | 8 | 14 | 10 | 10 | 11 | 9 | 9 | 8 | 8 | 6 | 7 | 8 | 7 | 5 | 6 | 6 | 6 | 6 | 6 | 6 | 6 | 6 | 7 | 6 | 8 | 6 | 6 | 6 | 6 | 6 |

Updated to match(es) played on 6 May 2012. Source: Matches
A = Away; H = Home; W = Win; D = Draw; L = Loss

==== Points by opponent ====
| Team | Results | | Points |
| Team | Home | Away | Points |
|---|---|---|---|
| Astra Ploieşti | 1–1 | 1–3 | 1 |
| FC Brașov | 1–0 | 2–0 | 6 |
| Ceahlăul | 0–0 | 2–0 | 4 |
| CFR Cluj | 0–4 | 0–2 | 0 |
| Concordia Chiajna | 0–0 | 0–1 | 1 |
| Dinamo București | 1–1 | 1–2 | 1 |
| Gaz Metan Mediaş | 1–0 | 0–1 | 3 |
| Pandurii Târgu Jiu | 2–1 | 1–0 | 6 |
| Petrolul Ploieşti | 1–0 | 1–2 | 3 |
| Rapid București | 2–0 | 0–1 | 3 |
| CS Mioveni | 0–0 | 2–1 | 4 |
| Sportul Studenţesc | 1–0 | 2–0 | 6 |
| Steaua București | 1–2 | 1–2 | 0 |
| FCM Târgu Mureş | 0–0 | 2–1 | 4 |
| Universitatea Cluj | 2–0 | 1–1 | 4 |
| FC Vaslui | 1–2 | 0–1 | 0 |
| Voinţa Sibiu | 3–0 | 1–0 | 6 |

Source: FCO

==== Matches ====
Kickoff times are in EET.

| 25 July 2011 Matchday 1 | Petrolul Ploieşti | 2–1 | Oțelul Galați | Buzău |
| 21:30 | Enescu (yellow card) 3' (yellow-red card) 90+1'; Stoimirović (yellow card) 26'; Đurović (yellow card) 45'; Opriţa 72', 90'; Buhuși (yellow card) 78' | (Report) | Punoševac 26', (yellow card) 15' (yellow-red card) 39'; Antal (yellow card) 24' (yellow-red card) 67'; Buş (yellow card) 48'; Perendija (yellow card) | Stadium: Municipal; Attendance: 4,000; Referee: Istvan Kovacs |

| 2 August 2011 Matchday 2 | Oțelul Galați | 0–0 | Concordia Chiajna | Galați |
| 20:30 | Perendija (yellow card) 82' | (Report) | Pană (yellow card) 37'; Muzac (yellow card) 44'; Niţă (yellow card) 66'; Iordache (yellow card) 82' | Stadium: Oțelul; Attendance: 7,000; Referee: Alexandru Deaconu |

| 14 August 2011 Matchday 3 | Ceahlăul | 0–2 | Oțelul Galați | Piatra Neamţ |
| 18:30 | Gafiţa (yellow card) 42' | (Report) | Neagu (yellow card) 51'; Perendija (yellow card) 58'; Filip 65'; Pena 83' (pen.); Costin (yellow card) 90+1' | Stadium: Ceahlăul; Attendance: 3,000; Referee: Florin Marcu |

| 20 August 2011 Matchday 4 | Oțelul Galați | 1–0 | FC Brașov | Galați |
| 19:00 | Pena 3'; Filip (yellow card) 40' | (Report) | Ionescu (yellow card) 37'; Domínguez (yellow card) 74'; Moutinho (yellow card) 79'; Hugo Sousa (yellow card) 84' | Stadium: Oțelul; Attendance: 7,000; Referee: Marius Avram |

| 28 August 2011 Matchday 5 | Dinamo București | 2–1 | Oțelul Galați | București |
| 20:00 | Moţi 22'; Grigore (yellow card) 39'; Torje (yellow card) 62'; Pătraşcu (yellow card) 71'; Niculae 80' | (Report) | Perendija (yellow card) 45'; Costin 73' | Stadium: Dinamo; Attendance: 2,000; Referee: Cristian Balaj |

| 9 September 2011 Matchday 6 | Oțelul Galați | 0–4 | CFR Cluj | Galați |
| 21:30 | Filip (yellow card) 30'; Ilie (red card) 33'; Sârghi (yellow card) 34' | (Report) | Ronny 1'; Mureşan (yellow card) 49'; Bastos 56'; Weldon 74'; Hora 90+1' | Stadium: Oțelul; Attendance: 7,000; Referee: Istvan Kovac |

| 17 September 2011 Matchday 7 | Voinţa Sibiu | 0–1 | Oțelul Galați | Sibiu |
| 17:00 | Popa (yellow card) 29'; Matei (yellow card) 76' | (Report) | Râpă (yellow card) 27'; Perendija (yellow card) 61'; Ljubinković (yellow card) 66'; Paraschiv 85'; Giurgiu (yellow card) 87' | Stadium: Municipal; Attendance: 6,000; Referee: Dragoş Istrate |

| 23 September 2011 Matchday 8 | Oțelul Galați | 0–0 | CS Mioveni | Galați |
| 21:30 | | (Report) | Gheorghe (yellow card) 42'; Hăisan (yellow card) 49'; Neaga (yellow card) 66'; Baicu (yellow card) 82' | Stadium: Oțelul; Attendance: 5,000; Referee: Andrei Chivulete |

| 2 October 2011 Matchday 9 | Steaua București | 2–1 | Oțelul Galați | Buzău |
| 21:30 | Nikolić 60' (pen.); Iliev (yellow card) 75'; Fl. Costea 90+3', (yellow card) 90+3'; Bourceanu (yellow card) 90+4' | (Report) | Punoševac 14'; Sălăgeanu (yellow card) 53'; Skubič (yellow card) 60'; Perendija (yellow card) 90+1' | Stadium: Municipal; Attendance: 6,000; Referee: Alexandru Tudor |

| 14 October 2011 Matchday 10 | Oțelul Galați | 1–1 | Astra Ploieşti | Galați |
| 21:30 | Iorga (yellow card) 16'; Râpă (yellow card) 30'; Perendija (yellow card) 33'; Punoševac 40'; Frunză (yellow card) 77'; Neagu (yellow card) 86' | (Report) | Fatai (yellow card) 33', (goal) 45+1'; Goian (yellow card) 85'; Takayuki (yellow card) 87' | Stadium: Oțelul; Attendance: 5,000; Referee: Emil Voicu |

| 22 October 2011 Matchday 11 | FCM Târgu Mureş | 1–2 | Oțelul Galați | Târgu Mureş |
| 21:00 | Nicu (yellow card) 38'; Topić (yellow card) 43'; Didi (yellow card) 45'; Buş 55'; Gugu (yellow card) 57'; Celsinho (yellow card) 85'; Ruiz (yellow card) 86' | (Report) | Sârghi (yellow card) 28', (goal) 54'; Antal (yellow card) 41'; Paraschiv 58'; Sălăgeanu (yellow card) 61'; Giurgiu (yellow card) 71'; Neagu (yellow card) 73'; Grahovac (yellow card) 90+3' | Stadium: Trans-Sil; Attendance: 4,000; Referee: Istvan Kovacs |

| 28 October 2011 Matchday 12 | Oțelul Galați | 1–0 | Gaz Metan Mediaş | Galați |
| 21:30 | Sârghi 47', (yellow card) 60'; Ilie (yellow card) 64'; Punoševac (yellow card) 90+2' | (Report) | Buzean (yellow card) 31'; Marković (yellow card) 60' | Stadium: Oțelul; Attendance: 5,000; Referee: Dragoş Istrate |

| 6 November 2011 Matchday 13 | Pandurii Târgu Jiu | 0–1 | Oțelul Galați | Târgu Jiu |
| 19:30 | Nistor (yellow card) 37'; Vranješ (yellow card) 45'; Štromajer (red card) 80'; Pintilii (yellow card) 84' | (Report) | Giurgiu (yellow card) 23'; Sălăgeanu (yellow card) 32'; Sârghi (yellow card) 42'; Iorga 78', (yellow card) 90+4' | Stadium: Tudor Vladimirescu; Attendance: 7,000; Referee: Paul Unimatan |

| 18 November 2011 Matchday 14 | Oțelul Galați | 1–0 | Sportul Studenţesc | Galați |
| 20:15 | Iorga 49'; Paraschiv (yellow card) 90+2' | (Report) | Lungu (yellow card) 72'; Ferfelea (yellow card) 83' | Stadium: Oțelul; Attendance: 4,000; Referee: Alexandru Tudor |

| 27 November 2011 Matchday 15 | Universitatea Cluj | 1–1 | Oțelul Galați | Cluj-Napoca |
| 18:00 | Păcurar (yellow card) 15'; Cristea (yellow card) 57'; Tony 90+2' | (Report) | Iorga 15' (pen.); Neagu (yellow card) 45+3'; Ilie (yellow card) 82'; Punoševac (yellow card) 89' | Stadium: Ion Moina; Attendance: 4,000; Referee: Ovidiu Haţegan |

| 4 December 2011 Matchday 16 | SC Vaslui | 1–0 | Oțelul Galați | Vaslui |
| 18:00 | Wesley 11'; Papp (yellow card) 82' (yellow-red card) 89'; Gerlem (yellow card) 90+4' | (Report) | Viglianti (yellow card) 61'; Paraschiv (yellow card) 75'; Punoševac (yellow card) 90+2' | Stadium: Municipal; Attendance: 5,000; Referee: Alexandru Tudor |

| 11 December 2011 Matchday 17 | Oțelul Galați | 2–0 | Rapid București | Galați |
| 18:00 | Antal 28'; Perendija (yellow card) 49'; Iorga 63'; Grahovac (yellow card) 82' | (Report) | Burcă (yellow card) 30'; Rui Duarte (yellow card) 62' | Stadium: Oțelul; Attendance: 10,000; Referee: Alexandru Deaconu |

| 18 December 2011 Matchday 18 | Oțelul Galați | 1–0 | Petrolul Ploieşti | Galați |
| 20:30 | Perendija 22'; Sălăgeanu (yellow card) 41' | (Report) | Stoimirović (yellow card) 41'; Milea (yellow card) 84' | Stadium: Oțelul; Attendance: 7,000; Referee: Sebastian Colțescu |

| 5 March 2012 Matchday 19 | Concordia Chiajna | 1–0 | Oțelul Galați | Chiajna |
| 20:30 | Muzac (yellow card) 23'; Dinu 65' | (Report) | Giurgiu (yellow card) 19'; Antal (yellow card) 48'; Ilie (yellow card) 76' (red card) 90'; Perendija (yellow card) 87' | Stadium: Concordia; Attendance: Augustus Constantin; Referee: 2,000 |

| 10 March 2012 Matchday 20 | Oțelul Galați | 0–0 | Ceahlăul | Galați |
| 19:00 | Râpă (yellow card) 26'; Sălăgeanu (yellow card) 27'; Sârghi (yellow card) 78' | (Report) | Drugă (yellow card) 75'; Muscalu (yellow card) 90+3' | Stadium: Oțelul; Attendance: 6,000; Referee: Radu Petrescu |

| 18 March 2012 Matchday 21 | FC Brașov | 0–2 | Oțelul Galați | Braşov |
| 18:00 | Munteanu (yellow card) 55'; Davide Dias (yellow card) 86'; Olariu (yellow card) 87' | (Report) | Didi 32'; Antal (yellow card) 56', (goal) 70' | Stadium: Silviu Ploeşteanu; Attendance: 5,000; Referee: Alexandru Tudor |

| 21 March 2012 Matchday 22 | Oțelul Galați | 1–1 | Dinamo București | Galați |
| 21:30 | Pena (yellow card) 17'; Iorga 24'; Sârghi (yellow card) 69'; Paraschiv (yellow card) 79'; Sălăgeanu (yellow card) 79'; Râpă (yellow card) 80' | (Report) | Grigore (yellow card) 11'; Pulhac (yellow card) 14'; Niculae 28' (pen.), (red card) 41'; Luchin (yellow card) 33'; Curtean (yellow card) 88'; Bălgrădean (yellow card) 90+4' | Stadium: Oțelul; Attendance: 11,000; Referee: Istvan Kovacs |

| 26 March 2012 Matchday 23 | CFR Cluj | 2–0 | Oțelul Galați | Cluj-Napoca |
| 19:00 | Kapetanos (yellow card) 17'; Mureşan 74', 82' | (Report) | Didi (yellow card) 73'; Ljubinković (yellow card) 85' | Stadium: Dr. Constantin Rădulescu; Attendance: 4,000; Referee: Marius Avram |

| 30 March 2012 Matchday 24 | Oțelul Galați | 3–0 | Voinţa Sibiu | Galați |
| 20:30 | Giurgiu 3'; Pena 54'; Costin (yellow card) 62'; Antal 85' | (Report) | | Stadium: Oțelul; Attendance: 3,000; Referee: Marcel Bîrsan |

| 9 April 2012 Matchday 25 | CS Mioveni | 1–2 | Oțelul Galați | Mioveni |
| 20:30 | Olteanu (yellow card) 11'; Naidin (yellow card) 41'; Năstăsie (yellow card) 48'; Ionescu 68' (pen.); Popescu (red card) 85' | (Report) | Didi 15', 32'; Filip (yellow card) 72'; Ilie (yellow card) 90+1' | Stadium: Dacia; Attendance: 1,000; Referee: Dorian Micloşină |

| 14 April 2012 Matchday 26 | Oțelul Galați | 1–2 | Steaua București | Galați |
| 20:00 | Didi 34'; Antal (yellow card) 54' | (Report) | Pârvulescu (yellow card) 21'; Iliev (yellow card) 45+1'; Tatu 49'; Chipciu (yellow card) 65'; M. Costea 66', (yellow card) 67' | Stadium: Oțelul; Attendance: 12,000; Referee: Alexandru Tudor |

| 23 April 2012 Matchday 27 | Astra Ploieşti | 3–1 | Oțelul Galați | Ploieşti |
| 21:30 | Fatai 43' (pen.), 80'; Budescu (yellow card) 58'; Băjenaru (yellow card) 73'; Spadacio 78' | (Report) | Filip (yellow card) 36'; Perendija (yellow card) 43'; Didi 64'; Neagu (yellow card) 79'; Pena (yellow card) 88' | Stadium: Astra; Attendance: 1,000; Referee: Ovidiu Haţegan |

| 29 April 2012 Matchday 28 | Oțelul Galați | 0–0 | FCM Târgu Mureş | Galați |
| 18:30 | Râpă (yellow card) 21'; Iorga (yellow card) 69' (yellow-red card) 85'; L. Buş (yellow card) 86'; Pena (yellow card) 87' | (Report) | Dan (yellow card) 31'; Albuț (yellow card) 74'; Homei (yellow card) 86' | Stadium: Oțelul; Attendance: 3,000; Referee: Radu Petrescu |

| 3 May 2012 Matchday 29 | Gaz Metan Mediaş | 1–0 | Oțelul Galați | Mediaş |
| 21:30 | Muth (yellow card) 30'; Vitinho 73'; Bawab (yellow card) 76'; Ba (yellow card) 81'; Gheorghe (yellow card) 90+2' | (Report) | Sârghi (yellow card) 71' (yellow-red card) 84' | Stadium: Gaz Metan; Attendance: 4,000; Referee: Catalin Botaş |

| 6 May 2012 Matchday 30 | Oțelul Galați | 2–1 | Pandurii Târgu Jiu | Galați |
| 19:30 | Didi (yellow card) 24', (goal) 41', 44'; Grahovac (yellow card) 82' | (Report) | Maxim 12'; Rada (yellow card) 59'; Viera (yellow card) 68' | Stadium: Oțelul; Attendance: 2,000; Referee: Eduard Ioniţă |

| 9 May 2012 Matchday 31 | Sportul Studenţesc | 0–2 | Oțelul Galați | București |
| 18:00 | | (Report) | Didi (yellow card) 36', (goal) 45'; Buş (yellow card) 48'; Giurgiu (yellow card) 52'; Filip 71' | Stadium: Regie; Attendance: 1,000; Referee: Teodor Crăciunescu |

| 12 May 2012 Matchday 32 | Oțelul Galați | 2–0 | Universitatea Cluj | Galați |
| 19:00 | Antal 24'; Râpă (yellow card) 38'; Pena (yellow card) 50', (goal) 66' (pen.); Neagu (yellow card) 88' | (Report) | Boştină (yellow card) 44'; Cojocnean (yellow card) 65'; Hoban (yellow card) 80'; Cristea (yellow card) 89' | Stadium: Oțelul; Attendance: 4,000; Referee: Sebastian Colţescu |

| 16 May 2012 Matchday 33 | Oțelul Galați | 1–2 | SC Vaslui | Galați |
| 21:30 | Buş (yellow card) 13'; Costin 20', (yellow card) 33'; Milan Perendija (yellow card) 59'; Râpă (yellow card) 64'; Antal (yellow card) 65'; Giurgiu (yellow card) 90+2' | (Report) | Wesley 14' (pen.); Yero Bello 23', (yellow card) 27'; Constantin (yellow card) 70'; Borjan (yellow card) 89' | Stadium: Oțelul; Attendance: 6,000; Referee: Nikolay Yordanov (Bulgaria) |

| 20 May 2012 Matchday 34 | Rapid București | 1–0 | Oțelul Galați | București |
| 17:00 | Rui Duarte (yellow card) 47' (yellow-red card) 57'; Deac 81' (pen.) | (Report) | Neagu (yellow card) 66'; Brăneţ (yellow card) 81'; Paraschiv (yellow card) 82' | Stadium: Giuleşti-Valentin Stănescu; Attendance: 2,000; Referee: Radu Petrescu |

=== UEFA Champions League ===
==== Group stage ====
| Pos | Team | Pld | W | D | L | GF | GA | GD | Pts | Qualification |
|---|---|---|---|---|---|---|---|---|---|---|
| 1 | (Portugal) Benfica | 6 | 3 | 3 | 0 | 8 | 4 | +4 | 12 | Advance to knockout phase |
| 2 | (Switzerland) Basel | 6 | 3 | 2 | 1 | 11 | 10 | +1 | 11 | Advance to knockout phase |
| 3 | (England) Manchester United | 6 | 2 | 3 | 1 | 11 | 8 | +3 | 9 | Transfer to Europa League |
| 4 | (Romania) Oțelul Galați | 6 | 0 | 0 | 6 | 3 | 11 | −8 | 0 | |

Source: Soccerway

| 14 September 2011 Matchday 1 | Basel (Switzerland) | 2–1 | (Romania) Oțelul Galați | Basel |
| 21:45 | Streller (yellow card) 35'; F. Frei 39'; Huggel (yellow card) 52' (yellow-red card) 87'; A. Frei 84' (pen.) | (Report) | Râpă (yellow card) 49'; Pena 58'; Sălăgeanu (red card) 82'; Antal (yellow card) 90+1'; Grahovac (yellow card) 90+3' | Stadium: St. Jakob-Park; Attendance: 30,126; Referee: William Collum (Scotland) |

| 27 September 2011 Matchday 2 | Oțelul Galați (Romania) | 0–1 | (Portugal) Benfica | Bucharest |
| 21:45 | Perendija (yellow card) 86'; Costin (yellow card) 88' | (Report) | Bruno César 40' | Stadium: Național; Attendance: 6,824; Referee: David Fernández Borbalán (Spain) |

| 18 October 2011 Matchday 3 | Oțelul Galați (Romania) | 0–2 | (England) Manchester United | Bucharest |
| 21:45 | Râpă (yellow card) 52'; Perendija (yellow card) 56' (yellow-red card) 89'; Neagu (yellow card) 62'; Costin (yellow card) 64'; Giurgiu (yellow card) 81' | (Report) | Carrick (yellow card) 54'; Rooney 64' (pen.), 90+2' (pen.); Vidić (red card) 66' | Stadium: Național; Attendance: 28,047; Referee: Felix Brych (Germany) |

| 2 November 2011 Matchday 4 | Manchester United (England) | 2–0 | (Romania) Oțelul Galați | Manchester |
| 21:45 | Valencia 6'; Evans (yellow card) 36'; Sârghi 86' (o.g.) | (Report) | Costin (yellow card) 16' | Stadium: Old Trafford; Attendance: 74,847; Referee: Marijo Strahonja (Croatia) |

| 22 November 2011 Matchday 5 | Oțelul Galați (Romania) | 2–3 | (Switzerland) Basel | Bucharest |
| 21:45 | Sălăgeanu (yellow card) 33'; Giurgiu 75'; Antal 81' | (Report) | F. Frei 10'; A. Frei 14'; Streller 37'; Dragović (yellow card) 62'; Cabral (yellow card) 72' | Stadium: Național; Attendance: 5,787; Referee: Tom Harald Hagen (Norway) |

| 7 December 2011 Matchday 6 | Benfica (Portugal) | 1–0 | (Romania) Oțelul Galați | Lisbon |
| 21:45 | Cardozo 7', (yellow card) 70' | (Report) | Ljubinković (yellow card) 83'; Giurgiu (yellow card) 86' | Stadium: Estádio da Luz; Attendance: 35,155; Referee: Manuel Gräfe (Germany) |

=== Cupa României ===
| 20 September 2011 Round of 32 | Oțelul Galați | 3–1 | Oltchim Râmnicu Vâlcea | Galați |
| 18:30 | Punoševac 5', 38'; Sârghi (yellow card) 28'; Iorga 90' | (Report) | O. Marinescu 29' (pen.) | Stadium: Oțelul; Attendance: 5,000; Referee: Dragoş Teodor |

| 25 October 2011 Round of 16 | Oțelul Galați | 2–1 | FCM Târgu Mureş | Galați |
| 19:00 | Frunză (yellow card) 44'; Paraschiv 50'; Râpă (yellow card) 53'; Neagu (yellow card) 87' (yellow-red card) 90+2'; Antal 87'; Sârghi (yellow card) 90+2' | (Report) | Ilyeş (yellow card) 18'; Dan (yellow card) 56'; Subotić 81'; Szilágyi (red card) 85'; Didi (yellow card) 90'; Celsinho (red card) 90+2' | Stadium: Oțelul; Attendance: 3,000; Referee: Robert Dumitru |

| 15 March 2012 Round of 8 | Oțelul Galați | 2–3 | FC Vaslui | Galați |
| 21:30 | Paraschiv (yellow card) 24'; Râpă (yellow card) 29'; Antal 65'; Iorga 67' (pen.); Didi (yellow card) 88' | (Report) | Almeida (yellow card) 25'; Wesley 45+2', 62', (yellow card) 69'; Milanov (yellow card) 66'; N'Doye 84', (yellow card) 85'; Stanciu (yellow card) 86' | Stadium: Oțelul; Attendance: 8,000; Referee: Cătălin Popa |

=== Supercupa României ===
| 17 July 2011 | Oțelul Galați | 1–0 | Steaua București | Piatra Neamţ |
| 20:45 | Buş 14'; Paraschiv (yellow card) 40'; Antal (yellow card) 69'; Râpă (yellow card) 89'; Grahovac (yellow card) 90' | (Report) | Brandán (yellow card) 40'; Bicfalvi (yellow card) 51'; Nicoliţă (yellow card) 58'; Martinović (yellow card) 59' | Stadium: Ceahlăul; Attendance: 13,253; Referee: Aurelian Dumitru |

=== Friendlies ===
| 23 June 2011 | Oțelul Galați | 1–4 | Astra Ploieşti | Braşov |
| 18:30 | Punoševac 45' | (Report) | Goian 13'; Rusu 14'; N'Doye 30'; Matei 59' | Stadium: Carpaţi |

Netherlands training camp

| 1 July 2011 | Oțelul Galați (Romania) | 0–0 | (Bulgaria) Litex Lovech | Doorwerth |
| 19:30 | Buş (yellow card) 49'; Ilie (yellow card) 54'; Râpă (yellow card) 89'; Progni (yellow card) 90+4' | (Report) | Yanev (yellow card) 48'; Jelenković (yellow card) 48' | Stadium: Sportpark de Waaijenberg |

| 3 July 2011 | Oțelul Galați (Romania) | 1–3 | (Israel) Maccabi Tel Aviv | Mierlo |
| 19:00 | Viglianti 15' | (Report) | Colautti 4'; Atar 10'; Dahan (yellow card) 25'; Micha 31' | Stadium: Sportpark de Ark; Referee: (Netherlands) Paul Coppens |

| 5 July 2011 | Oțelul Galați (Romania) | 1–0 | (Belgium) Anderlecht | Tegelen |
| 17:00 | Punoševac 82' | (Report) | Samuel (yellow card) 30' | Stadium: Sportpark de Bakenbos; Referee: Wim Bronsvoort |

| 7 July 2011 | Oțelul Galați (Romania) | 1–1 | (Turkey) Trabzonspor | Wezep |
| 20:00 | Neagu 44' | (Report) | Altıntop 52' | Stadium: Sportpark Mulderssingel; Attendance: 500; Referee: Ruud Bossen |

| 9 July 2011 | Lokeren (Belgium) | 1–1 | (Romania) Oțelul Galați | Lokeren, Belgium |
| 19:00 | Taravel 9' | (Report) | Pena 49' | Stadium: Daknamstadion; Attendance: 2,000 |

Others

| 7 August 2011 | Oțelul Galați (Romania) | 1–1 | (Turkey) Beşiktaş | Netherlands |
| 18:00 | Iorga 38' | (Report) | Hugo Almeida 11' | Attendance: 0 |

| 3 September 2011 | FC Tiraspol (Moldova) | 0–1 | (Romania) Oțelul Galați | Tiraspol |
| 18:00 | | (Report) | Antal 87' | Stadium: Sheriff |

| 8 October 2011 | Oțelul Galați (Romania) | 2–0 | (Moldova) FC Tiraspol | Galați |
| 19:30 | Giurgiu 26'; Buş 90+3' | (Report) | | Stadium: Oțelul; Attendance: 2,500; Referee: Marius Bocăneală |

| 12 November 2011 | Oțelul Galați | 0–1 | Ceahlăul Piatra Neamț | Focşani |
| 14:00 | | (Report) | Pavel 70' | Stadium: Milcovul; Attendance: 200 |

Cyprus training camp

| 26 January 2012 | Oțelul Galați (Romania) | 1–2 | (Russia) FC Mordovia Saransk | Larnaca |
| 15:15 | Perendija 39' | (Report) | ? 57' ? 65' | Stadium: Alpha Sport Center |

| 28 January 2012 | Oțelul Galați (Romania) | 0–1 | (Russia) Volga Novgorod | Larnaca |
| 17:00 | | (Report) | Maksimov 84' (pen.) | Stadium: Alpha Sport Center |

| 31 January 2012 | Oțelul Galați (Romania) | 1–1 | (Czech Republic) Viktoria Plzeň | Larnaca |
| 17:30 | Giurgiu 64' (pen.) | (Report) | Řezník 51' | Stadium: Alpha Sport Center |

| 3 February 2012 | Oțelul Galați (Romania) | 1–1 | (Poland) Śląsk Wrocław | Larnaca |
| 15:15 | Viglianti 58' | (Report) | Cetnarski 27' | Stadium: Alpha Sport Center |

Spain training camp

| 8 February 2012 | Oțelul Galați (Romania) | 0–0 | (Spain) CD Dénia | Oliva |
| 17:00 | | (Report) | | Stadium: Oliva Nova Golf Hotel |

| 10 February 2012 | Oțelul Galați (Romania) | 4–0 | (China) Dalian Aerbin | Polop |
| 13:00 | Antal 19', 34'; Punoševac 45'; Giurgiu 60' | (Report) |

| 12 February 2012 | Oțelul Galați (Romania) | 1–0 | (China) Shandong Luneng | Oliva |
| 14:00 | Punoševac 4' (pen.) | (Report) | | Stadium: OlivaNova.com |

| 15 February 2012 | Oțelul Galați (Romania) | 1–0 | (Spain) Orihuela CF | Benidorm |
| 12:00 | Štromajer 89' | (Report) |

Turkey training camp

| 18 February 2012 | Oțelul Galați (Romania) | 0–1 | (Serbia) OFK Beograd | Antalya |
| 15:30 | | (Report) | Popović 31' | Stadium: University Stadium |

| 20 February 2012 | Oțelul Galați (Romania) | 2–2 | (Ukraine) Shakhtar Donetsk | Antalya |
| 16:30 | Pena 9'; Giurgiu 35'; Ilie (red card) 73' | (Report) | Dentinho 49'; Teixeira 56' | Stadium: Mardan Palace |

| 24 February 2012 | Oțelul Galați (Romania) | 2–0 | (Denmark) Lyngby BK | Antalya |
| 16:00 | Antal 64'; Viglianti 82' | (Report) | | Stadium: Titanic |

== See also ==
- FC Oțelul Galați
- 2011–12 Liga I
- 2011–12 Cupa României
- 2011–12 UEFA Champions League
