= 2011–12 FC Universitatea Cluj season =

Universitatea Cluj
2011–12 season
- Chairman: Florian Walter
- Manager: Ionuţ Badea
- Stadium: Cluj Arena
- Liga I: 8th
- Cupa României: Round of 32
- Top goalscorer: League: Adrian Cristea (8); All: Adrian Cristea (8)
Home colours	Away colours

The 2011–12 season was the 86th season of competitive football by Universitatea Cluj.

== Players ==
=== Squad ===
As of 10 June 2011. Note: Flags indicate national team as defined under FIFA eligibility rules; some limited exceptions apply. Players may hold more than one non-FIFA nationality.

No.	Pos.	Nation	Player
1	GK	ROU	Florin Matache
2	DF	POL	Łukasz Szukała
3	MF	SEN	Gaston Mendy
4	DF	ROU	Zsolt Szilágyi
5	DF	FRA	Steven Pelé
6	DF	ROU	Octavian Abrudan
7	MF	ROU	Vlad Morar
8	MF	FRA	Nasser Menassel
9	FW	ROU	Claudiu Niculescu
10	MF	ROU	Alexandru Păcurar
11	FW	BRA	Machado
12	GK	ROU	Marius Popa
14	DF	ARG	Elias Bazzi

No.	Pos.	Nation	Player
16	DF	ROU	Eduard Nicola
17	FW	ROU	Andrei Voican
18	DF	ROU	Bogdan Unguruşan
20	MF	ROU	Sebastian Cojocnean
21	DF	ROU	Rares Cucui
22	MF	ROU	Gabriel Boştină (captain)
23	DF	ROU	Sebastian Achim
24	MF	GUI	Habib Baldé
26	FW	NGA	Anthony Nwakaeme
27	MF	ROU	Laurenţiu Marinescu
28	MF	ROU	Vasile Gheorghe
30	MF	ROU	Adrian Cristea
33	GK	ROU	Ionuţ Boşneag

=== Squad changes ===
==== In ====
#	Pos	Player	From	Fee	Date
2	DF	(Poland) Łukasz Szukała	Gloria Bistriţa		1–07–2011
23	DF	(Romania) Sebastian Achim	Gloria Bistriţa		1–07–2011
16	DF	(Romania) Eduard Nicola	Victoria Brăneşti		1–07–2011
27	DF	(Romania) Laurenţiu Marinescu	Steaua București		1–07–2011

==== Out ====
#	Pos	Player	To	Fee	Date
		(Romania) Dãnuţ Munteanu	Unknown	Released	1–07–2011
		(Italy) Nicola Ascoli	Unknown	Released	1–07–2011
		(Spain) Roberto Alfonso Delgado	Unknown	Released	1–07–2011
		(Romania) Vasile Gheorghe	Unknown	Released	1–07–2011
		(Romania) Bogdan Buhuş	Unknown	Released	1–07–2011

=== Appearances and goals ===
Last updated on 24 July 2011.

No.	Pos	Nat	Player	Total		Liga I		Cupa României	
No.	Pos	Nat	Player	Apps	Goals	Apps	Goals	Apps	Goals
1	GK	(Romania) ROU	Florin Matache	0	0	0	0	0	0
2	DF	(Poland) POL	Łukasz Szukała	1	0	1	0	0	0
3	DF	(Senegal) SEN	Gaston Mendy	1	0	1	0	0	0
4	DF	(Romania) ROU	Zsolt Szilágyi	0	0	0	0	0	0
5	DF	(France) FRA	Steven Pelé	1	0	1	0	0	0
6	DF	(Romania) ROU	Octavian Abrudan	0	0	0	0	0	0
7	MF	(Romania) ROU	Vlad Morar	0	0	0	0	0	0
8	MF	(France) FRA	Nasser Menassel	1	0	1	0	0	0
9	FW	(Romania) ROU	Claudiu Niculescu	1	0	1	0	0	0
10	MF	(Romania) ROU	Alexandru Păcurar	1	0	1	0	0	0
11	FW	(Brazil) BRA	Machado	1	1	1	1	0	0
12	GK	(Romania) ROU	Marius Popa	1	0	1	0	0	0
14	DF	(Argentina) ARG	Elias Bazzi	0	0	0	0	0	0
16	DF	(Romania) ROU	Eduard Nicola	0	0	0	0	0	0
17	FW	(Romania) ROU	Andrei Voican	0	0	0	0	0	0
18	DF	(Romania) ROU	Bogdan Unguruşan	1	0	1	0	0	0
20	MF	(Romania) ROU	Sebastian Cojocnean	0	0	0	0	0	0
21	DF	(Romania) ROU	Rares Cucui	0	0	0	0	0	0
22	MF	(Romania) ROU	Gabriel Boştină	1	0	1	0	0	0
23	DF	(Romania) ROU	Sebastian Achim	0	0	0	0	0	0
24	MF	(Senegal) SEN	Habib Baldé	0	0	0	0	0	0
26	FW	(Nigeria) NGA	Anthony Nwakaeme	0	0	0	0	0	0
27	MF	(Romania) ROU	Laurenţiu Marinescu	0	0	0	0	0	0
28	MF	(Romania) ROU	Vasile Gheorghe	0	0	0	0	0	0
30	MF	(Romania) ROU	Adrian Cristea	1	0	1	0	0	0
33	GK	(Romania) ROU	Ionuţ Boşneag	0	0	0	0	0	0

=== League table ===
Pos	Team	Pld	W	D	L	GF	GA	GD	Pts
6	Oțelul Galați	34	15	7	12	34	29	+5	52
7	Pandurii Târgu Jiu	34	12	11	11	47	40	+7	47 (Note: PAN 1–0 UCL; UCL 0–1 PAN)
8	Universitatea Cluj	34	11	14	9	46	37	+9	47
9	Concordia Chiajna	34	13	6	15	42	52	−10	45 (Note: CON 2–1 BRA; BRA 2–3 CON)
10	Brașov	34	13	6	15	39	34	+5	45

Source: LPF (in Romanian)
Rules for classification: 1st points; 2nd overall goals difference; 3rd overall goals scored (until the end of the season)

==== Results by round ====
Round	1	2	3	4	5	6	7	8	9	10	11	12	13	14	15	16	17	18	19	20	21	22	23	24	25	26	27	28	29	30	31	32	33	34
Ground	A	H	A	H	A	H	A	H	A	H	A	H	A	A	H	A	H	H	A	H	A	H	A	H	A	H	A	H	A	H	H	A	H	A
Result	W	W	L	W	D	D	D	W	W	W	L	D	W	L	D	D	L	D	D	L	D	W	D	W	D	W	D	L	D	D	L	L	W	L
Position	6	3	5	3	4	5	5	4	2	3	5	5	4	4	4	6	8	8	8	8	8	8	8	7	7	7	6	7	6	7	7	7	7	8

Updated to match(es) played on 20 May 2012. Source: Matches
A = Away; H = Home; W = Win; D = Draw; L = Loss

==== Points by opponent ====
Team	Results		Points
Team	Home	Away	Points
Astra Ploieşti			
FC Brașov			
Ceahlăul Piatra Neamţ			
CFR Cluj			
Concordia Chiajna			
Dinamo București			
Gaz Metan Mediaş			
CS Mioveni		0–1	3
Oţelul Galaţi			
Pandurii Târgu Jiu			
Petrolul Ploieşti			
Rapid București	2–0		3
Sportul Studenţesc			
Steaua București			
FCM Târgu Mureş			
FC Vaslui			
Voinţa Sibiu			

=== Competitive ===
==== Liga I ====
Kickoff times are in EET.

==== Results ====
22 July 2011 Round 1	Dacia Mioveni	0–1	Universitatea Cluj	Stadionul Dacia, Mioveni
22:00		Report^{(Archived from original)}	40' Machado	Attendance: 6,000; Referee: Radu Marian Petrescu (București)

30 July 2011 Round 2	Universitatea Cluj	2–0	Rapid București	Cluj Arena, Cluj
20:20	Rui Duarte 29' (o.g.); Claudiu Niculescu 40'	Report^{(Archived from original)}		Attendance: 5,000; Referee: Cristian Balaj
