= 2012–13 FC Universitatea Cluj season =

Universitatea Cluj
2012–13 season
- Head coach: Marius Șumudică/vacant
- Ground: Cluj Arena
- Liga I: 12th
- Cupa României: Round of 32
- Top goalscorer: League: Viorel Dinu (9); All: Viorel Dinu (9)

The 2012–13 season was the 87th season of competitive football by a University

== Players ==
=== Squad information ===
N	Pos.	Nat.	Name	Age	EU	Since	App	Goals	Ends	Transfer fee	Notes
1	GK	(Romania)	Cătălin Samoilă	35	EU	2012	0	0			
2	DF	(Romania)	Raul Ciupe	41	EU	2012	0	0			
3	DF	(Romania)	Valeriu Lupu	34	EU	2012	3	0			loan from Steaua București
4	DF	(Romania)	Zsolt Szilágyi	43	EU	1998	161	13			
5	DF	(Brazil)	Alex Braz	40	Non-EU	2012					
6	DF	(Romania)	Adrian Popa	40	EU	2012					
7	MF	(Romania)	Bogdan Pătrașcu	46	EU	2012	1	1			
8	MF	(Romania)	Roberto Iancu	43	EU	2012					
10	FW	(Romania)	Mihai Roman	33	EU	2012					loan from Petrolul Ploiești
11	FW	(Romania)	Octavian Drăghici	39	EU	2011	13	3			
12	GK	(Romania)	Dragoș Balauru	35	EU	2012					loan from Târgu Mureș
14	FW	(Brazil)	Cleiton C. De Melo	41	Non-EU	2012					
16	DF	(Romania)	Eduard Nicola	42	EU	2012	1				
17	MF	(Romania)	Ionuț Năstăsie	33	EU	2012					loan from Steaua București
18	MF	(Romania)	Vasile Gheorghe	40	EU	2012	0	0			
20	MF	(Portugal)	Paulinho	40	EU	2012	0	0			
21	DF	(Romania)	Rareș Cucui	31	EU	2010	1	0			
23	DF	(Romania)	Apostol Muzac	37	EU	2012					
24	FW	(Brazil)	Alex dos Santos	35	Non-EU	2012	13	1			loan from Fluminense
26	DF	(Brazil)	Erico da Silva	35	Non-EU	2012					
26	MF	(Romania)	Georgian Tobă	36	EU	2010	5				
29	FW	(Romania)	Viorel Dinu	45	EU	2012					
30	DF	(Cyprus)	Paraskevas Christou	41	EU	2012					
33	GK	(Romania)	Ionuț Boșneag	43	EU	2010					
77	DF	(Bulgaria)	Plamen Krumov	39	EU	2012	2				
82	GK	(Greece)	Georgios Ambaris	43	EU	2012					
Players sold or loaned out during the season

- Last updated: 17 November 2012 (UTC)
- Source: Universitatea Cluj

=== Transfers ===
==== In ====
No.	Pos.	Nat.	Name	Age	EU	Moving from	Type	Transfer window	Ends	Transfer fee	Source
				0							

==== Out ====
No.	Pos.	Nat.	Name	Age	EU	Moving to	Type	Transfer window	Transfer fee	Source
				0						

Last updated: 19:58, 30 June 2012 (UTC)

== Competitions ==
=== Overall ===
Competition	First match
Liga I	20 July 2012
Cupa României	20 July 2012

=== Liga I ===
==== League table ====
Pos	Team	Pld	W	D	L	GF	GA	GD	Pts
10	Gaz Metan Mediaș	34	12	10	12	42	46	−4	46
11	Oțelul Galați (Note: Oțelul Galați were deducted two points because of debts owed to agent Codoban Tătar Ionel.)	34	11	10	13	38	42	−4	41
12	Universitatea Cluj	34	10	8	16	39	55	−16	38
13	Viitorul Constanța	34	8	12	14	45	57	−12	36
14	Ceahlăul Piatra Neamț	34	9	7	18	41	59	−18	34

Source: Liga I (in Romanian)
Rules for classification: 1) points; 2) head-to-head points; 3) head-to-head goal difference; 4) head-to-head goals scored; 5) goal difference; 6) number of goals scored.

==== Results summary ====
Overall								Home						Away					
Pld	W	D	L	GF	GA	GD	Pts	W	D	L	GF	GA	GD	W	D	L	GF	GA	GD
34	10	8	16	39	55	−16	38	6	3	8	20	25	−5	4	5	8	19	30	−11

Last updated: 11 November 2012 (UTC).
Source: LPF

==== Results by round ====
Round	1	2	3	4	5	6	7	8	9	10	11	12	13	14	15	16	17	18	19	20	21	22	23	24	25	26	27	28	29	30	31	32	33	34
Ground	A	H	A	H	A	H	A	H	H	A	H	A	H	A	H	A	H	H	A	H	H	A	H	A	H	A	H	A	H	A	A	H	A	H
Result	L	W	L	W	D	D	W	L	L	L	W	L	D	L	L	L	L	D	D	L	D	W	D	W	W	D	L	L	W	W	L	W	L	L
Position	17	8	12	7	9	11	6	10	12	13	11	12	13	14	14	15	15	16	16	16	16	14	14	12	12	12	12	13	12	12	12	12	12	12

Updated to match(es) played on 29 May 2013. Source: universitateacluj.ro
A = Away; H = Home; W = Win; D = Draw; L = Loss

==== Points by opponent ====
Team	Results		Points
Team	Home	Away	Points
Astra Ploiești	1–3	1–2	3
Brașov	1–1	0–0	2
Ceahlăul Piatra Neamț	1–0	2–1	3
CFR Cluj	1–2	3–1	0
Concordia Chiajna	1–0	0–2	3
Dinamo București	1–2	1–1	1
Gaz Metan Mediaș	3–4	2–1	0
Gloria Bistrița	1–0	0–0	4
Iași	0–2	4–0	0
Oțelul Galați	1–1	0–2	4
Pandurii Târgu Jiu	1–1	6–2	1
Petrolul Ploiești	2–4	2–0	0
Rapid București	1–2	1–4	3
Steaua București	0–1	5–1	0
Turnu Severin	1–0	1–1	4
Vaslui	2–1	1–0	3
Viitorul Constanța	2–1	1–1	4

==== Results ====
20 July 2012 Round 1	Pandurii Târgu Jiu	6 – 2	Universitatea Cluj	Târgu Jiu
18:30	Ibeh 11'; Ousmane Viera 15'; Ibeh 23'; Răduț 66'; Matulevicius 76'; Boutadjine 85'		B. Pătrașcu 43'; Păcurar 75'	Stadium: Tudor Vladimirescu

29 July 2012 Round 2	Universitatea Cluj	1 – 0	Gloria Bistrița	Cluj-Napoca
19:00	Szilagyi 80'			Stadium: Cluj Arena

5 August 2012 Round 3	Steaua București	5 – 1	Universitatea Cluj	București
21:30	Rocha 16'; Rocha 60'; Rusescu 62'; C. Tănase 71'; C. Tănase 84'		V. Dinu 81'	Stadium: Arena Națională

29 July 2012 Round 4	Universitatea Cluj	2 – 1	Viitorul	Cluj-Napoca
19:00	V. Dinu 1'; Cleiton 77'		Dică 90'	Stadium: Cluj Arena

17 August 2012 Round 5	Turnu Severin	1 – 1	Universitatea Cluj	Turnu Severin
19:00	Abba 83'		V. Dinu 6'	Stadium: Stadionul Municipal

=== Cupa României ===
==== Results ====
26 September 2012	Delta Tulcea (II)	2 – 1	Universitatea Cluj (I)	Tulcea
16:30	Florea 42'; Câju 86'		Cleiton 63'	Stadium: Delta; Referee: Florin Miron
