= Ljubinković =

Ljubinković (Serbian Cyrillic: Љубинковић) is a Serbian surname. Notable people with the surname include:

- Marko Ljubinković (born 1981), former Serbian footballer
- Zoran Ljubinković (born 1982), Serbian footballer
