= 2011–12 Cupa României =

Tournament details
- Country: Romania
- Teams: 202

Final positions
- Champions: Dinamo București
- Runners-up: Rapid București

The 2011–12 Cupa României was the seventy-fourth season of the annual Romanian football knockout tournament. The winner of the competition qualified for the play-off round of the 2012–13 UEFA Europa League.

== Round of 32 ==
The 14 winners of the fifth round entered in this round and were joined by the 18 teams from the 2011–12 Liga I.

20 September 2011	Gaz Metan Severin	2–2 (a.e.t.) (4–1 p)	CS Mioveni	Drobeta-Turnu Severin
16:00	Trifu 17'; Coţan 45'		Dina 34'; Gheorghe 59'	Stadium: Municipal; Referee: Dragoş Istrate

20 September 2011	FC Brașov	2–0 (a.e.t.)	FCM Bacău	Braşov
16:00	Buga 96'; Machado 107'			Stadium: Silviu Ploeşteanu; Referee: Adrian Ilyeş

20 September 2011	Petrolul Ploiești	4–1	Concordia Chiajna	Strejnic
16:30	Melinte 19'; Komazec 65'; Negru 76'; Mitea 83'		Popa 7'	Stadium: Conpet; Referee: Radu Petrescu

20 September 2011	Oțelul Galați	3–1	Oltchim Râmnicu Vâlcea	Galați
18:30	Punoševac 5', 38'; Sârghi (yellow card) 28'; Iorga 90'	(Report)	O. Marinescu 29' (pen.)	Stadium: Oțelul; Attendance: 5,000; Referee: Dragoş Teodor

21 September 2011	CF Brăila	0–1	Gaz Metan Mediaş	Brăila
16:00		(Report)	Frăsinescu 48'	Stadium: Municipal (Brăila); Attendance: 6,000; Referee: Emil Voicu

21 September 2011	Dunărea Galaţi	1–0	Sportul Studențesc București	Galaţi
16:00	V. Munteanu 31'			Stadium: Dunărea; Attendance: 300; Referee: Lucian Rusandu

21 September 2011	Voința Sibiu	0–0 (a.e.t.) (3–4 p)	CS Otopeni	Sibiu
16:00				Stadium: Municipal (Sibiu); Referee: Mugurel Drăgănescu

21 September 2011	Pandurii Târgu Jiu	5–0	CS Vișina Nouă	Târgu Jiu
16:00	Štromajer 7'; Batin 14', 87'; Vranješ 46'; Grigoraş 75'			Stadium: Tudor Vladimirescu; Referee: Cătălin Popa

21 September 2011	Astra II Giurgiu	1–0 (a.e.t.)	Universitatea Cluj	Giurgiu
16:00	Budescu 108'			Stadium: Marin Anastasovici; Referee: Claudiu Baboia

21 September 2011	Politehnica Timișoara	2–0	Ceahlăul Piatra Neamț	Timișoara
17:00	Goga 15'; Curtean 75'			Stadium: Dan Păltinişanu; Referee: Florin Miron

21 September 2011	Rapid București	4–1	Juventus București	Bucharest
19:00	Roman 37', 45'; Apostol 64', 79'		Zaharia 89'	Stadium: Giuleşti-Valentin Stănescu; Referee: Andrei Chivulete

21 September 2011	Astra Ploiești	1–0	CFR Cluj	Ploiești
21:30	Fatai 46'			Stadium: Astra; Referee: Adrian Cojocaru

22 September 2011	FCM Târgu Mureş	1–0	Viitorul Constanţa	Târgu Mureş
18:30	Ilyeş 2'			Stadium: Trans-Sil

22 September 2011	SC Vaslui	8–0	Voința Livezile	Vaslui
20:00	Gheorghiu 8'; Bello 23', 42', 83'; Buhăescu 40'; Costin 80'; Wesley 81', 86'			Stadium: Municipal (Vaslui)

22 September 2011	Steaua București	4–0	Sănătatea Cluj	Buzău
20:30	Nikolić 2'; Prepeliță 31'; Martinović 50'; Popa 87'			Stadium: Municipal (Buzău)

22 September 2011	Dinamo București	1–0	Luceafărul Oradea	Bucharest
21:15	Luchin 31'			Stadium: Dinamo

== Round of 16 ==
The 16 winners of the fifth phase entered in this round.

25 October 2011	Gaz Metan Mediaş	1–0	Astra II Giurgiu	Mediaş
16:00	Medeiros 67'			Stadium: Gaz Metan; Attendance: 1000; Referee: Crăciunescu

25 October 2011	Oțelul Galați	2–1	FCM Târgu Mureş	Galați
19:00	Paraschiv 51'; Antal 87'		Subotić 81'	Stadium: Oțelul; Attendance: 3000; Referee: Dumitru

26 October 2011	Pandurii Târgu Jiu	0–0 (a.e.t.) (3–2 p)	FC Brașov	Târgu Jiu
16:00				Stadium: Tudor Vladimirescu; Attendance: 4000; Referee: Petrescu

26 October 2011	Dinamo București	5–0	Gaz Metan Severin	Bucharest
21:30	Ganea 37' 60'; Luchin 42'; Ţucudean 73'; Păun 83'			Stadium: Dinamo; Attendance: 200; Referee: Unimatan

27 October 2011	SC Vaslui	4–1	Dunărea Galaţi	Vaslui
16:00	Lopes 38'; Neagu 55'; Adaílton 56' 70'		19' Chelaru	Stadium: Municipal (Vaslui); Attendance: 4000; Referee: Colțescu

27 October 2011	Astra Ploiești	0–1	Petrolul Ploiești	Ploiești
17:30			21' Buhuşi	Stadium: Astra; Attendance: 4500; Referee: Comănescu

27 October 2011	Rapid București	5–0	CS Otopeni	Bucharest
19:00	Grigore 32'; Cássio 37'; Burcă 55'; Deac 67'; Gângioveanu 89'			Stadium: Giuleşti-Valentin Stănescu; Attendance: 1500; Referee: Cojocaru

27 October 2011	Politehnica Timișoara	2–0	Steaua București	Timișoara
20:45	Ricketts 28'; Goga 52'			Stadium: Dan Păltinişanu; Attendance: 20000; Referee: Balaj

== Quarterfinals ==
The 8 winners of the fifth phase entered in this round.

7 December 2011	Rapid București	2–0	Pandurii Târgu Jiu	Bucharest
18:30	António 59'; Grigorie 79'	Report		Stadium: Giuleşti-Valentin Stănescu; Attendance: 5,000; Referee: Cristian Balaj

8 December 2011	Politehnica Timișoara	0–1	Gaz Metan Mediaş	Timișoara
18:00		Report	Bud 8'	Stadium: Dan Păltinişanu; Attendance: 5,000; Referee: Alexandru Deaconu

8 December 2011	Dinamo București	2–1	Petrolul Ploiești	Bucharest
20:30	Dănciulescu 14'; Ganea 56'	Report	Borza 48' (pen.)	Stadium: Dinamo; Attendance: 800; Referee: Ovidiu Alin Haţegan

15 March 2012	Oțelul Galați	2–3	SC Vaslui	Galați
21:30	Antal 65'; Iorga 67'	Report	Wesley 45', 62'; N'Doye 84'	Stadium: Oțelul; Attendance: 8,000; Referee: Catalin Popa

== Semifinals ==
Team 1	Agg.	Team 2	1st leg	2nd leg+
SC Vaslui	2–4	Rapid București	0–1	2–3
Dinamo București	2–2	Gaz Metan Mediaş	1–0	1–2

=== First leg ===
28 March 2012	SC Vaslui	0–1	Rapid București	Vaslui
20:00 EET		Report	Herea 71' (pen.)	Stadium: Municipal; Attendance: 7,000; Referee: Marius Avram

29 March 2012	Dinamo București	1–0	Gaz Metan Mediaş	Bucharest
20:00 EET	Rus 88'	Report		Stadium: Dinamo; Attendance: 1,500; Referee: Radu Petrescu

=== Second leg ===
11 April 2012	Rapid București	3–2 (4–2 agg.)	SC Vaslui	Bucharest
21:30 EET	Grigore 1'; Alexa 64'; Roman 88'	Report	Wesley 6', 47'	Stadium: Giuleşti-Valentin Stănescu; Attendance: 2,500; Referee: Marius Avram

12 April 2012	Gaz Metan Mediaş	2–1 (2–2 agg.)	Dinamo București	Mediaș
21:30 EET	Marković 8'; Issa Ba 79'		Stoica 58'	Stadium: Gaz Metan; Attendance: 10,000; Referee: Radu Petrescu

== Final ==
23 May 2012
21:00 EEST

Rapid București	0–1	Dinamo București
Grigorie (yellow card) 70'; Oros (yellow card) 90+1'		58' Scarlatache; (yellow card) 68' Niculae; (yellow card) 90+5' Naumovski

Arena Națională, Bucharest
Attendance: 40,000
Referee: Daniele Orsato (Italy)

Cupa României 2011–12 winners

13th title
