= Georgian Tobă =

Romanian footballer

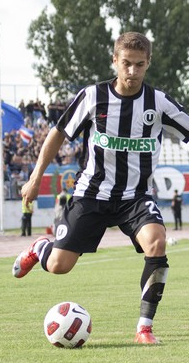

Personal information
- Full name: Georgian Constantin Tobă
- Date of birth: 23 May 1989 (age 37)
- Place of birth: Drobeta-Turnu Severin, Romania
- Height: 1.72 m (5 ft 7 1/2 in)
- Position: Midfielder

Youth career
- 1999–2003: FC Drobeta-Turnu Severin
- 2003–2007: Gică Popescu Football Academy

Senior career*
Years	Team	Apps	(Gls)
2007–2010	FC Drobeta-Turnu Severin	37	(4)
2010	→ UTA Arad (loan)	13	(1)
2010–2012	Universitatea Cluj	9	(0)
2011	→ Unirea Urziceni (loan)	12	(1)
2011–2012	→ Delta Tulcea (loan)	20	(4)
2013	Turnu Severin	2	(0)
2013–2015	Al-Safa'	17	(4)
2015–2016	Minerul Motru		
- * Club domestic league appearances and goals as of 24 August 2016

Georgian Constantin Tobă (born 23 May 1989) is a Romanian football player.
