= Didi (footballer, born 1982) =

Brazilian footballer

Personal information
- Full name: Cleidimar Magalhães Silva
- Date of birth: September 10, 1982 (age 44)
- Place of birth: Itabira, Minas Gerais, Brazil
- Height: 1.77 m (5 ft 10 in)
- Position: Striker

Senior career*
Years	Team	Apps	(Gls)
2002–2004	Juventude	11	(4)
2004–2005	Santa Cruz	18	(11)
2005	Marco	26	(12)
2005–2007	Paços Ferreira	46	(8)
2007–2010	CFR Cluj	52	(13)
2010	→ Leixões (loan)	6	(1)
2010–2011	FCM Târgu Mureș	32	(3)
2012–2013	Oțelul Galați	28	(8)
Total		219	(60)
- * Club domestic league appearances and goals as of 29 August 2014

Cleidimar Magalhães Silva (born 10 September 1982 in Itabira, Minas Gerais), commonly known as Didi, is a retired Brazilian footballer who played as a striker.

== Honours ==
=== Player ===
CFR Cluj

- Liga I: 2007–08, 2009–10
- Cupa României: 2007–08, 2008–09, 2009–10
- Supercupa României: 2009
