= Steven Pelé =

French footballer (born 1981)

Personal information
- Full name: Steven Robert Pelé
- Date of birth: 28 August 1981 (age 45)
- Place of birth: Brou-sur-Chantereine, France
- Height: 1.88 m (6 ft 2 in)
- Position: Defender

Team information
- Current team: ESSA Saint-Avé Football (Manager)

Senior career*
Years	Team	Apps	(Gls)
1998	Gueugnon	1	(0)
1999–2003	Rennes	0	(0)
2002–2003	→ Le Mans (loan)	14	(0)
2004–2005	Istres	41	(2)
2005–2007	Grenoble	68	(5)
2007–2008	Guingamp	28	(2)
2008–2010	Strasbourg	43	(2)
2010	Maccabi Petah Tikva	0	(0)
2010–2012	Universitatea Cluj	27	(3)
2013	Le Pontet	15	(1)
2013–2014	Vannes	23	(1)
2014–2016	Avenir Saint Servant		
2016–2017	Séné FC		
2017–2018	Avenir De Theix		
Total		260	(16)

International career
2000	France U18	5	(0)
2001	France U20	1	(0)
2002	France U21	3	(0)

Managerial career
- 2016–2017: Séné FC (player-manager)
- 2019–: ESSA Saint-Avé Football
- * Club domestic league appearances and goals

Steven Robert Pelé (born 28 August 1981) is a French former professional footballer who played as a defender. He is the older brother of Yohann Pelé.

== Coaching career ==
In the summer 2016, Pelé joined Séné FC as a playing manager.

Ahead of the 2019–20 season, he became the manager of ESSA Saint-Avé Football.

== Honours ==
France U18

- UEFA European Under-18 Championship: 2000
