= Milan Perendija =

Serbian footballer

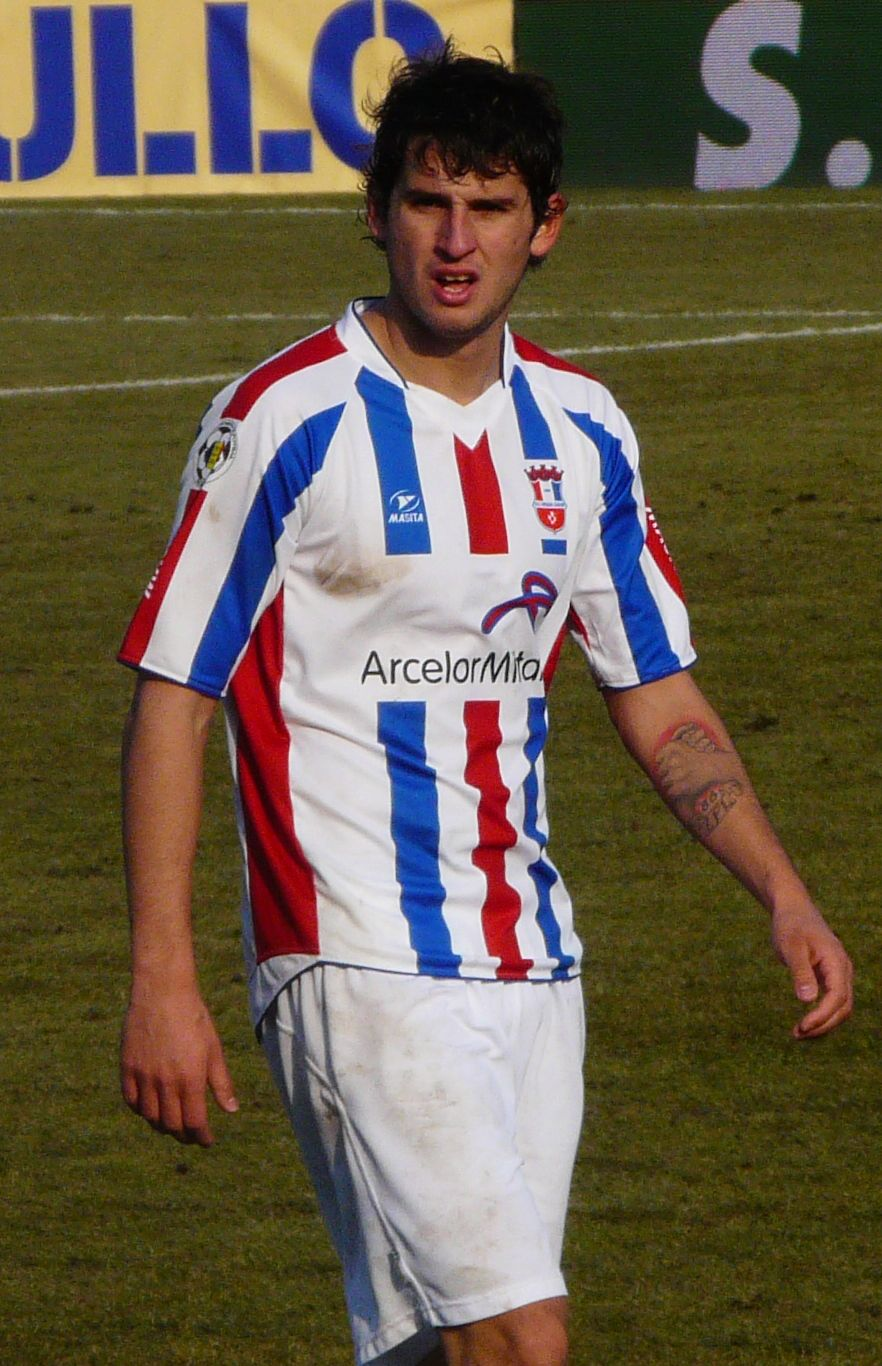
- Perendija with Oțelul Galați in 2011

Personal information
- Date of birth: 5 January 1986 (age 40)
- Place of birth: Belgrade, SFR Yugoslavia
- Height: 1.90 m (6 ft 3 in)
- Position: Centre-back

Youth career
- Partizan

Senior career*
| Years | Team | Apps | (Gls) |
| 2004–2006 | Partizan | 0 | (0) |
| 2004–2006 | → Teleoptik (loan) | 54 | (1) |
| 2006 | → Voždovac (loan) | 9 | (0) |
| 2007 | → Vardar (loan) | 12 | (0) |
| 2007–2008 | Vardar | 29 | (1) |
| 2008–2009 | Rabotnički | 26 | (0) |
| 2009–2012 | Oțelul Galați | 73 | (1) |
| 2013–2016 | Mordovia Saransk | 70 | (4) |
| 2017 | Radnički Niš | 11 | (0) |
| 2017 | Gaz Metan Mediaș | 6 | (0) |
| 2018–2020 | Rad | 66 | (4) |
| 2025–2026 | Rad | 21 | (6) |

International career
| 2002–2003 | Serbia and Montenegro U17 (Note: Only official UEFA matches included) | 4 | (0) |
| 2004–2005 | Serbia and Montenegro U19 | 9 | (0) |
- * Club domestic league appearances and goals as of 15 July 2026

Milan Perendija (Serbian Cyrillic: Милан Перендија; born 5 January 1986) is a Serbian professional footballer who plays as a defender.

== Club career ==
Perendija progressed through the youth ranks of Partizan, before spending time out on loan at Teleoptik (2004–2006), Voždovac (2006), and Vardar (2007). He helped the latter club win the Macedonian Cup in the 2006–07 season. Perendija spent one more year with Vardar, before switching to crosstown rivals Rabotnički. He helped them win the Macedonian Cup in the 2008–09 season.

In the summer of 2009, Perendija was transferred to Romanian side Oțelul Galați. He helped the club win the championship in the 2010–11 season for the first time in their history. In the 2013 winter transfer window, Perendija moved to Russia and signed with Mordovia Saransk.

In early 2017, after spending 10 years abroad, Perendija returned to his homeland and signed for SuperLiga side Radnički Niš until the end of the 2016–17 season. He was released by the club after just three months.

In July 2017, Perendija returned to Romania and joined Gaz Metan Mediaș for one year. He parted ways with the club by mutual consent two months later. In early 2018, Perendija was acquired by Serbian SuperLiga side Rad.

== International career ==
Perendija represented Serbia and Montenegro at the 2005 UEFA European Under-19 Championship.

== Honours ==
Vardar

- Macedonian Cup: 2006–07

Rabotnički

- Macedonian Cup: 2008–09

Oțelul Galați

- Liga I: 2010–11
- Supercupa României: 2011

Mordovia Saransk

- Russian Football National League: 2013–14
