= Bogdan Ungurușan =

Romanian footballer

Bogdan Unguruşan
Personal information
- Full name: Bogdan Alexandru Ungurușan
- Date of birth: 20 February 1983 (age 43)
- Place of birth: Zalău, Romania
- Height: 1.78 m (5 ft 10 in)
- Position: Right back

Youth career
- 1997–2002: Universitatea Cluj

Senior career*
Years	Team	Apps	(Gls)
2004–2005	Armătura Zalău	30	(2)
2006–2011	Universitatea Cluj	159	(8)
2012–2017	Pandurii Târgu Jiu	132	(0)
2017–2018	Botoșani	42	(0)
2019	Victoria Cluj	14	(4)
Total		377	(14)

Managerial career
- 2019–2022: Victoria Cluj (assistant)
- * Club domestic league appearances and goals as of 09:28, 9 December 2022 (UTC)

Bogdan Alexandru Ungurușan (born 20 February 1983) is a Romanian former footballer who plays as a right back. In his career Ungurușan played for: Armătura Zalău, Universitatea Cluj, Pandurii Târgu Jiu, FC Botoșani and Victoria Cluj.

== Honours ==
=== Club ===
Pandurii

- Liga I: runner-up 2013
