= Andrei Voican =

Romanian footballer

Personal information
- Date of birth: 14 January 1991 (age 35)
- Place of birth: Bucharest, Romania
- Height: 1.84 m (6 ft 0 in)
- Position: Forward

Youth career
- Dinamo București

Senior career*
Years	Team	Apps	(Gls)
2007–2009	Dinamo II București	23	(5)
2009–2014	Universitatea Cluj	37	(3)
2012	→ Petrolul Ploieşti (loan)	0	(0)
2013–2014	→ Berceni (loan)	8	(1)
2014–2015	Ștefănești	?	(?)
2015–2016	Afumați	?	(?)
2016	Metaloglobus București	?	(?)
2018	Metaloglobus București	10	(1)

International career^{‡}
2011–2012	Romania U-21	4	(0)
- * Club domestic league appearances and goals as of 3 June 2018 ‡ National team caps and goals as of 5 October 2016

Andrei Voican (born 14 January 1991) is a Romanian football forward.
