= Adrian Sălăgeanu =

Romanian footballer

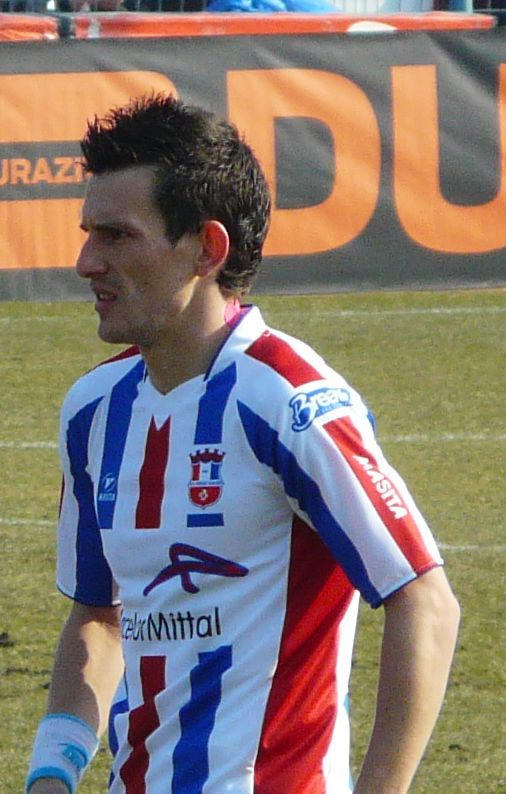

Personal information
- Full name: Adrian Ioan Sălăgeanu
- Date of birth: 9 April 1983 (age 43)
- Place of birth: Carei, Romania
- Height: 1.78 m (5 ft 10 in)
- Positions: Left back; left midfielder

Senior career*
Years	Team	Apps	(Gls)
2001–2004	Olimpia Satu Mare	72	(5)
2005–2006	Gloria Bistrița	11	(0)
2006	Dacia Mioveni	6	(0)
2006–2007	Someșul Satu Mare	32	(5)
2008–2012	Oțelul Galați	116	(3)
2012–2014	Vaslui	39	(1)
2014	ASA Târgu Mureș	2	(0)
2015–2016	Olimpia Satu Mare	27	(3)
2016–2017	SV Moosbach	19	(12)
2017–2019	Oțelul Galați	33	(3)
Total		357	(32)

International career^{‡}
2011–2012	Romania	1	(0)
- * Club domestic league appearances and goals as of 4 April 2020 ‡ National team caps and goals as of 24 October 2017

Adrian Ioan Sălăgeanu (born 9 April 1983 in Carei, Romania) is a Romanian football player.

== Career ==
=== Oțelul Galați ===
He played 4 years for Oțelul Galați being a key player in the 11/12 season where he won his first league title.

=== FC Vaslui ===
On 14 June 2012 he signed a 3-year deal with FC Vaslui.

== International career ==
Sălăgeanu made his debut for the Romania national team at the age of 27 in February 2011 in a friendly game against Cyprus.

== Honours ==
=== Oțelul Galați ===
- Liga I
  - Winner: 2010–11
- Supercupa României
  - Winner: 2011
