= Ionuț Boșneag =

Romanian footballer

Personal information
- Date of birth: 15 February 1982 (age 44)
- Place of birth: Pitești, Romania
- Height: 1.86 m (6 ft 1 in)
- Position: Goalkeeper

Team information
- Current team: Argeș Pitești (GK coach)

Youth career
- 1992–2004: Argeș Pitești

Senior career*
Years	Team	Apps	(Gls)
2005–2010	Argeș Pitești	96	(0)
2005	→ Dacia Mioveni (loan)	5	(0)
2010–2013	Universitatea Cluj	12	(0)
2013	Oțelul Galați	5	(0)
2014	UTA Arad	6	(0)
2014–2015	Academica Argeș	1	(0)
2015–2018	Astra Giurgiu	1	(0)
Total		126	(0)

Managerial career
- 2018–2021: Astra Giurgiu (GK coach)
- 2021: Universitatea Craiova (GK coach)
- 2022: Al-Shabab (GK coach)
- 2022–2023: Al-Raed (GK coach)
- 2023–: Argeș Pitești (GK coach)
- * Club domestic league appearances and goals

Ionuț Boșneag (born 15 February 1982) is a Romanian former professional footballer who played as a goalkeeper, currently goalkeeping coach at Liga I club Argeș Pitești.

== Honours ==
Argeș Pitești

- Liga II: 2007–08

Astra Giurgiu

- Liga I: 2015–16
- Cupa României runner-up: 2017–18
- Supercupa României: 2016
