= Zsolt Szilágyi (footballer) =

Romanian footballer (born 1981)

Personal information
- Full name: Zsolt Loránt Szilágyi
- Date of birth: 29 June 1981 (age 45)
- Place of birth: Cluj-Napoca, Romania
- Height: 1.80 m (5 ft 11 in)
- Position: Defender

Team information
- Current team: Universitatea Cluj (team manager)

Youth career
- 1991–1998: Universitatea Cluj

Senior career*
Years	Team	Apps	(Gls)
1998–2014	Universitatea Cluj	187	(14)
Total		187	(14)

Managerial career
- 2015: Universitatea Cluj (assistant)
- 2016: Universitatea Cluj
- 2016–2017: Universitatea Cluj (assistant)
- * Club domestic league appearances and goals

Zsolt Loránt Szilágyi (born 29 June 1981) is a Romanian former footballer who played as a defender, spending his entire career at Universitatea Cluj. He was a fan favorite at The Red Caps due to his proven fidelity over time, being nicknamed Unicul căpitan (English: The only captain).

== Playing career ==
"If I wasn't a player, I would have definitely be a supporter of this team. We must be proud of Universitatea Cluj"

— Zsolt Szilágyi talking about his loyalty towards "U" Cluj

Szilágyi was born on 29 June 1981 in Cluj-Napoca, Romania and began playing junior-level football in 1991 at age 10 for local club Universitatea. He made his Divizia A debut on 28 May 1999 under coach Tiberiu Poraczky in a 6–0 away loss to FC Onești. That was his only appearance of the season, the team being relegated at the end of it. In the next season he played again only in one game as the team was relegated once more, but Szilágyi stayed with the club in Divizia C, helping it get promoted back to Divizia B after one season. In the following years, he played more frequently until 2005, when he suffered a cruciate ligament injury in his right leg during a game against Unirea Dej. Because of that injury, Szilágyi suffered three operations which kept him off the field for about three years. During that period, "U" Cluj got promoted to the first league, but was relegated after only one year, without him being able to help the team. In 2008, Szilágyi started to play again for The Red Caps, helping them gain promotion to the first league in 2010. He scored his first Liga I goal on 10 October 2010 in a 2–2 draw against Politehnica Timișoara. Subsequently, during a training session in December he suffered another torn cruciate ligament, this time at the left knee, which sidelined him for approximately one and a half years. In 2012, he started to play again for "U" Cluj, scoring two more Liga I goals, first in a 1–0 win over Gloria Bistrița and the second in a 1–1 draw against Săgeata Năvodari. Szilágyi's last Liga I game took place on 25 October 2013 in a 2–0 away loss to FC Vaslui, totaling 37 games with three goals in the competition.

== Coaching career ==
Szilágyi worked as an assistant for "U" Cluj on two occasions in 2015 and from 2016 until 2017. Between these two spells, he was also the team's head coach for a short period while they were in the second league.

== Honours ==
Universitatea Cluj

- Divizia C: 2000–01

== See also ==
- List of one-club men in association football
