= Apostol Muzac =

Romanian footballer

Personal information
- Full name: Apostol Muzac
- Date of birth: 6 July 1987 (age 39)
- Place of birth: Bucharest, Romania
- Position: Midfielder

Senior career*
Years	Team	Apps	(Gls)
2007–2011	Steaua II București	19	(0)
2010–2011	→ Unirea Urziceni (loan)	24	(0)
2011–2012	Concordia Chiajna	24	(0)
2012–2013	Universitatea Cluj	24	(2)
2013–2015	Săgeata Năvodari	25	(0)
2015	Juventus București		
2015–2016	Delta Dobrogea Tulcea		
- * Club domestic league appearances and goals as of 13 September 2016

Apostol Muzac (born 6 July 1987 in Bucharest, Romania) is a Romanian football player.

== Career ==
While playing for Steaua II București, Apostol was loaned out to Unirea Urziceni. He made his Liga I debut on 11 September 2010, in a match against Steaua București.
