= Rareș Cucui =

Romanian footballer

Personal information
- Date of birth: 30 October 1993 (age 33)
- Place of birth: Târnăveni, Romania
- Height: 1.83 m (6 ft 0 in)
- Position: Defender

Senior career*
Years	Team	Apps	(Gls)
2010–2014	Universitatea Cluj	2	(0)
2013	→ Damila Măciuca (loan)	6	(0)
2014	→ Râmnicu Vâlcea (loan)	2	(0)
2014–2016	Râmnicu Vâlcea	23	(1)
2015	→ Mioveni (loan)	9	(0)
Total		42	(1)

International career^{‡}
2011	Romania U-19	2	(0)
- * Club domestic league appearances and goals as of 12:42, 15 June 2021 (UTC) ‡ National team caps and goals as of 12:42, 15 June 2021 (UTC)

Rareș Cucui (born 30 October 1993) is a Romanian former footballer who played as a defender for teams such as Universitatea Cluj and CSM Râmnicu Vâlcea, among others.
