= Zoran Ljubinković =

Serbian football manager and player (born 1982)

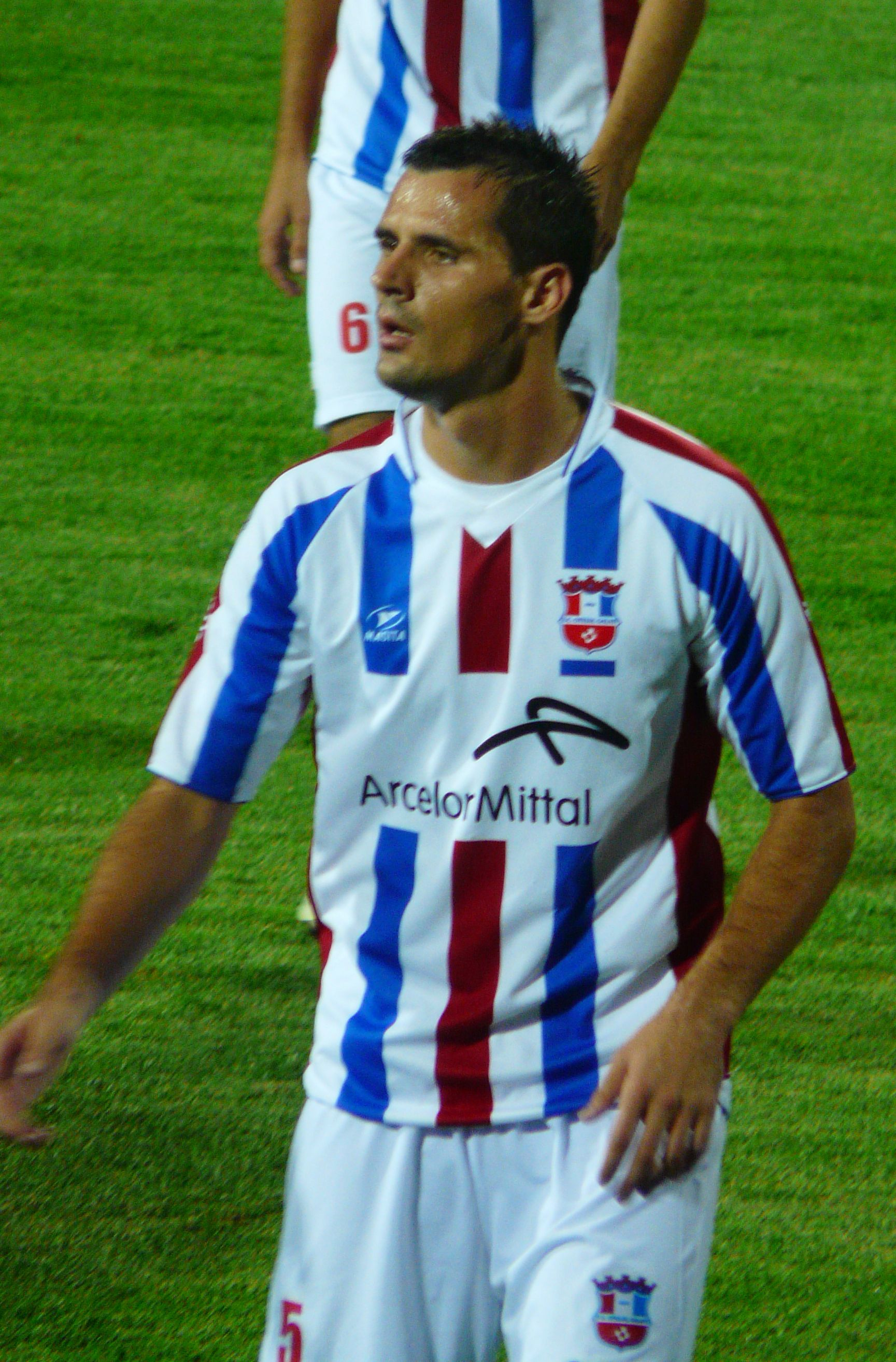
- Ljubinković with Oțelul Galați in 2011

Personal information
- Date of birth: 4 July 1982 (age 44)
- Place of birth: Subotica, SR Serbia, SFR Yugoslavia
- Height: 1.83 m (6 ft 0 in)
- Position: Defender

Senior career*
Years	Team	Apps	(Gls)
1999–2001	Spartak Subotica	59	(0)
2002–2004	Royal Antwerp	16	(1)
2004–2006	Zemun	13	(1)
2006–2007	Spartak Subotica	29	(0)
2007–2008	Mladost Apatin	45	(3)
2009	Smederevo	6	(0)
2010	Radnički Niš	17	(0)
2010	Inđija	10	(1)
2011	Petrolul Ploiești	13	(0)
2011–2013	Oțelul Galați	28	(0)
2013–2014	Universitatea Craiova	25	(1)
2014–2015	Radnički Niš	11	(0)
2015–2018	Rad	80	(0)
2019	Kolubara	9	(0)
Total		361	(7)

International career
2000–2001	FR Yugoslavia U18 (Note: Official UEFA matches only)	7	(0)

Managerial career
- 2022: Žarkovo
- 2022–2023: BASK
- 2023: Radnik Surdulica
- * Club domestic league appearances and goals

Zoran Ljubinković (Serbian Cyrillic: Зоран Љубинковић; born 4 July 1982) is a Serbian football manager and former player.

== Club career ==
Ljubinković started out at Spartak Subotica, making his senior debut in 1999, aged 17. He was transferred to Belgian club Royal Antwerp in the 2002 winter transfer window. Over the following years, Ljubinković played for numerous sides in his homeland, including Zemun, Spartak Subotica (second spell), Mladost Apatin, Smederevo, Radnički Niš (twice), Inđija, and Rad. He also played for three Romanian clubs, namely Petrolul Ploiești, Oțelul Galați (making his UEFA Champions League debut in 2011–12), and Universitatea Craiova. In 2019, Ljubinković briefly played for Kolubara, before retiring from the game.

== International career ==
Ljubinković represented FR Yugoslavia at the 2001 UEFA European Under-18 Championship.

== Managerial career ==
In June 2023, Ljubinković was appointed as manager of Serbian SuperLiga club Radnik Surdulica.

== Career statistics ==
Club	Season	League	
Club	Season	Apps	Goals
Spartak Subotica	1999–2000	19	0
Spartak Subotica	2000–01	28	0
Spartak Subotica	2001–02	12	0
Spartak Subotica	Total	59	0
Royal Antwerp	2001–02	5	0
Royal Antwerp	2002–03	11	1
Royal Antwerp	2003–04	0	0
Royal Antwerp	Total	16	1
Zemun	2004–05	13	1
Zemun	2005–06	0	0
Zemun	Total	13	1
Spartak Subotica	2006–07	29	0
Mladost Apatin	2007–08	29	2
Mladost Apatin	2008–09	16	1
Mladost Apatin	Total	45	3
Smederevo	2008–09	5	0
Smederevo	2009–10	1	0
Smederevo	Total	6	0
Radnički Niš	2009–10	17	0
Inđija	2010–11	10	1
Petrolul Ploiești	2010–11	13	0
Oțelul Galați	2011–12	8	0
Oțelul Galați	2012–13	20	0
Oțelul Galați	Total	28	0
Universitatea Craiova	2013–14	25	1
Radnički Niš	2014–15	11	0
Rad	2015–16	27	0
Rad	2016–17	27	0
Rad	2017–18	19	0
Rad	2018–19	7	0
Rad	Total	80	0
Kolubara	2018–19	9	0
Career total		361	7

== Managerial statistics ==
As of 16 November 2023

Managerial record by team and tenure
Team	From	To	Record				
Team	From	To	G	W	D	L	Win %
Žarkovo	1 January 2022	30 June 2022	16	4	5	7	25.00
BASK	30 June 2022	31 May 2023	30	10	10	10	33.33
Radnik Surdulica	1 June 2023	present	15	1	6	8	6.67
Career total			61	15	21	25	24.59

== Honours ==
Petrolul Ploiești

- Liga II: 2010–11

Oțelul Galați

- Supercupa României: 2011

Universitatea Craiova

- Liga II: 2013–14
