= Alexandru Buhuși =

Romanian footballer

Alexandru Buhuşi
Personal information
- Full name: Alexandru Buhuşi
- Date of birth: 31 May 1990 (age 36)
- Place of birth: Iaşi, Romania
- Height: 1.78 m (5 ft 10 in)
- Position: Midfielder

Senior career*
Years	Team	Apps	(Gls)
2009–2010	Politehnica Iaşi	7	(0)
2010	Victoria Brăneşti	2	(0)
2010–2011	Chimia Brazi		
2011–2012	Petrolul Ploieşti	19	(1)
2012–2015	Fortuna Poiana Câmpina	5	(0)
2015–2016	Forţa Podu Iloaei		
2016	Știința Miroslava		

International career^{‡}
2011	Romania U-21	1	(0)
- * Club domestic league appearances and goals as of 29 August 2016 ‡ National team caps and goals as of 10 November 2011

Alexandru Buhuşi (born 31 May 1990) is a Romanian football player.
