= Eduard Nicola =

Romanian footballer

Personal information
- Full name: Eduard Adrian Nicola
- Date of birth: 20 May 1983 (age 43)
- Place of birth: Râmnicu Sărat, Romania
- Height: 1.79 m (5 ft 10 1/2 in)
- Position: Left back

Team information
- Current team: Agricola Borcea

Youth career
- 1993–2005: Olimpia Râmnicu Sărat

Senior career*
Years	Team	Apps	(Gls)
2005–2006	CSM Râmnicu Sărat	?	(?)
2006–2007	Gloria Buzău	3	(0)
2007	Inter Gaz București	15	(0)
2008–2009	Dunărea Giurgiu	45	(2)
2009–2011	Victoria Brăneşti	59	(2)
2011–2013	Universitatea Cluj	26	(2)
2011–2012	→ Voința Sibiu (loan)	21	(0)
2013–2014	ACS Poli Timișoara	9	(0)
2014	Rapid București	0	(0)
2015	Academica Clinceni	3	(0)
2017–2020	Agricola Borcea	?	(?)
Total		180	(6)
- * Club domestic league appearances and goals

Eduard Adrian Nicola (born 20 May 1983) is a Romanian footballer who plays for Agricola Borcea.
