= Laurențiu Iorga =

Romanian footballer

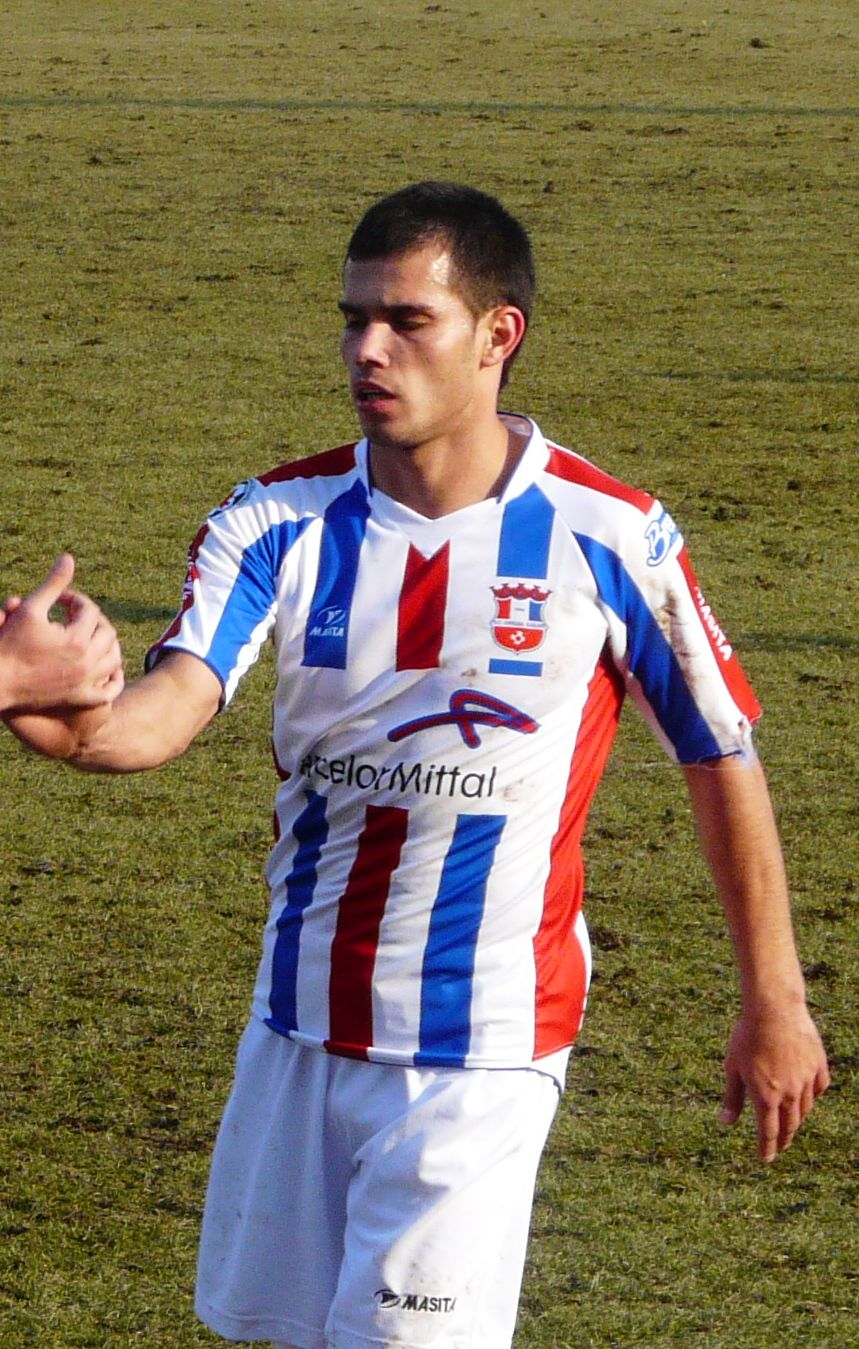

Personal information
- Full name: Laurențiu Cătălin Iorga
- Date of birth: 17 March 1988 (age 38)
- Place of birth: Babadag, Romania
- Height: 1.77 m (5 ft 10 in)
- Position: Winger

Team information
- Current team: CSM Reșița (fitness coach)

Youth career
- –2006: Oțelul Galați

Senior career*
Years	Team	Apps	(Gls)
2006–2007	Oțelul Galați II		
2007–2014	Oțelul Galați	170	(20)
2014	Astra Giurgiu	8	(1)
2014–2015	Pandurii Târgu Jiu	8	(0)
2015	→ Oțelul Galați (loan)	17	(1)
2015–2016	Voluntari	17	(0)
2017–2018	Wigry Suwałki	21	(3)
2018–2019	Oțelul Galați	19	(1)
2019	Bałtyk Gdynia	7	(0)
2020	SCM Zalău	1	(0)
2020–2022	Viitorul Ianca	28	(10)
2022	Sporting Liești		
Total		296	(36)

International career
2007–2009	Romania U21	7	(1)

Managerial career
- 2023–2025: Oțelul Galați (assistant)
- 2025: Sepsi OSK (assistant)
- 2025–2026: Hermannstadt (assistant)
- 2026–: CSM Reșița (fitness coach)
- * Club domestic league appearances and goals

Laurențiu Cătălin Iorga (born 17 March 1988) is a Romanian former professional footballer who played as a winger, currently fitness coach at Liga II club CSM Reșița.

== Career ==
Iorga started his career at Oțelul Galați, the club where he played as a junior. With Oțelul, Iorga became Romanian champion in 2011, and played in the Champions League. During the 2011–12 UEFA Champions League season, Iorga made three group-stage appearances for Oțelul Galați, against Manchester United, Basel and Benfica.

On 9 January 2014, it was announced that Iorga has signed for Astra in a deal worth €500k.

After only six months at Giurgiu, Iorga moved to Pandurii Târgu Jiu where he signed a contract for two years.

In August 2015, Iorga reached a deal for two seasons with FC Voluntari.

In August 2017, he signed a one-year deal with Wigry Suwałki.

== Honours ==
Oţelul Galaţi

- Liga I: 2010–11
