= Stadionul Tudor Vladimirescu (1963) =

Former multi-purpose stadium in Târgu Jiu, Romania

Coordinates: 45°02′37.10″N 23°16′12.20″E

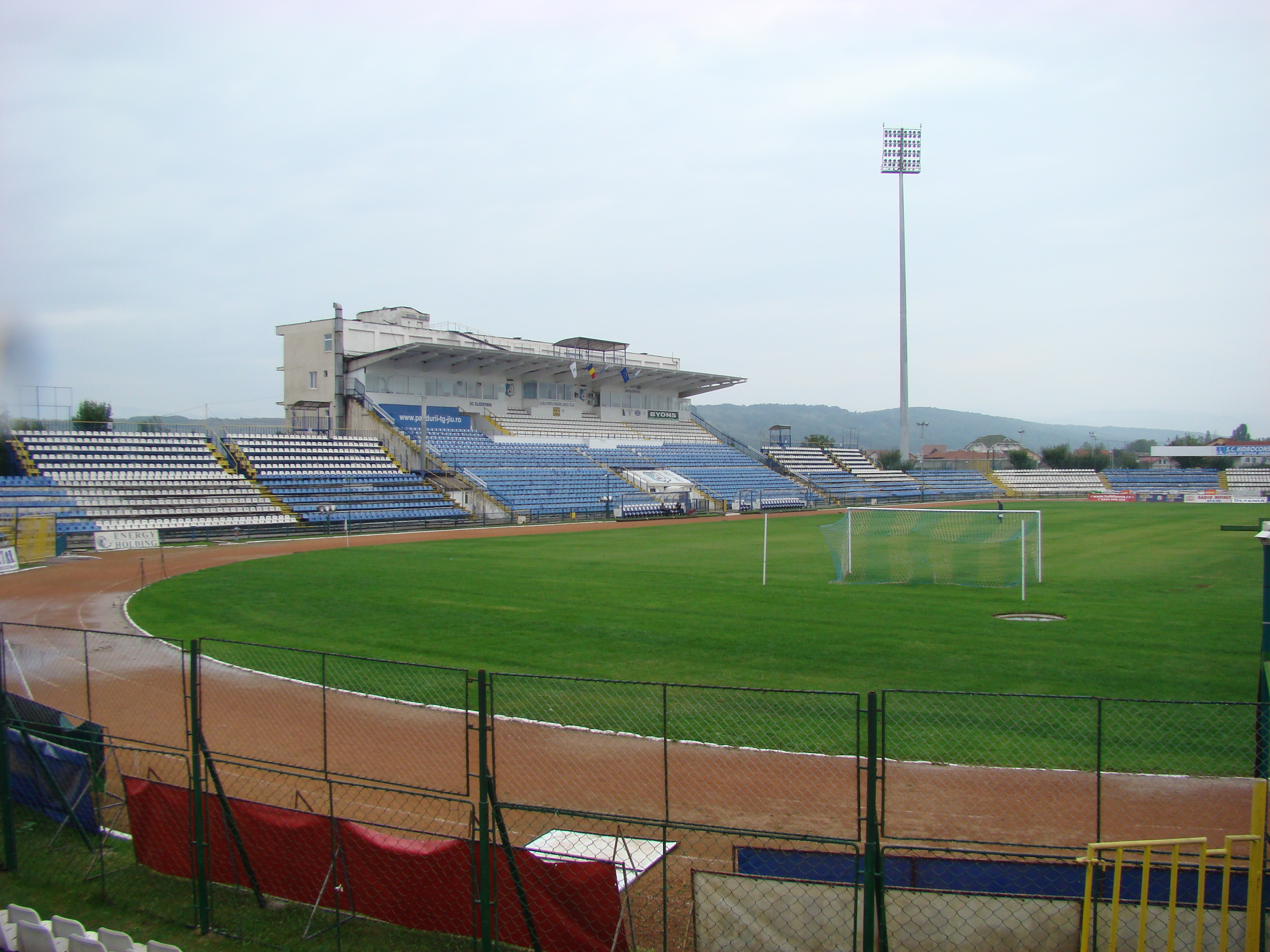
- Interactive map of Stadionul Tudor Vladimirescu
- Location: Târgu Jiu, Romania
- Capacity: 9,200 seats
- Surface: Grass

Construction
- Opened: 1963
- Renovated: 2005, 2010-2011
- Demolished: 2015

Tenant
- Pandurii Târgu Jiu (1963–2015)

Stadionul Tudor Vladimirescu was a multi-purpose stadium in Târgu Jiu, Romania. It was mostly used for football matches and was the home ground of Pandurii Târgu Jiu. It was named after Wallachian hero Tudor Vladimirescu.

The stadium hosted the Romanian Cup Final of the 2008-2009 season.

The stadium was entirely demolished in 2015 and replaced by the new Stadionul Tudor Vladimirescu.

== See also ==
- List of football stadiums in Romania
