= 2013–14 FC Vaslui season =

FC Vaslui
2013–14 season
- President: (Romania) Ciprian Damian
- Manager: (Romania) Ilie Stan (Resigned on 2 Aug 2013) (Romania) Ionuț Moșteanu (From 3 Aug 2013)
- Liga I: 5th
- Cupa României: Quarter-finals (eliminated)
- Top goalscorer: League: Liviu Antal (13); All: Liviu Antal (14)
- Highest home attendance: 4,000 vs CFR Cluj (5 August 2013)
- Lowest home attendance: 2,000 vs Poli Timișoara (16 September 2013)

The 2013–14 season is the twelfth season in FC Vaslui's existence, and its ninth in a row in the top flight of Romanian football. Vaslui will seek to win their first trophy, competing in the Liga I and the Romanian Cup.

== First-team squad ==
No.	Name	Age	Nat.	Since	T. Apps.	L. Apps.	C. Apps.	I. Apps.	T. Goals	L. Goals	C. Goals	I. Goals	Ends	Transfer fee
Goalkeepers
22	Octavian Ormenişan	20	(Romania)	2013	0	0	0	0	0	0	0	0	N/A	Free
89	Cătălin Straton	23	(Romania)	2012 (W)	18	16	1	1	0	0	0	0	2016	Undisclosed
Defenders
4	Andrei Cordoş	25	(Romania)	2012	26	22	3	1	0	0	0	0	2014	€150,000
20	Nicolae Muşat	26	(Romania)	2013	23	20	3	0	1	1	0	0	2016	Free
21	Ionuţ Balaur	24	(Romania)	2007	33	25	4	4	2	2	0	0	N/A	Youth
67	Marius Mareş	17	(Romania)	2012	3	3	0	0	0	0	0	0	2018	Free
70	Igor Prahić	26	(Croatia)	2013	18	15	3	0	0	0	0	0	2016	Free
Midfielders
2	Andrei Sluser	18	(Romania)	2014	1	1	0	0	0	0	0	0	N/A	Youth
8	Liviu Antal	24	(Romania)	2012	69	62	3	4	22	20	1	1	2016	€500,000
10	Leonard Manole	20	(Romania)	2013	3	2	1	0	0	0	0	0	N/A	Free
11	Paul Popa	18	(Romania)	2014	1	1	0	0	0	0	0	0	N/A	Youth
15	Adrian Neniţă	16	(Romania)	2013 (W)	4	3	1	0	0	0	0	0	2018	Youth
17	Sergiu Popovici	20	(Romania)	2012 (W)	14	14	0	0	0	0	0	0	N/A	Undisclosed
25	Franco Razzotti	28	(Argentina)	2014 (W)	10	10	0	0	0	0	0	0	N/A	Free
28	Madson	22	(Brazil)	2013	27	25	2	0	3	2	1	0	N/A	Free
38	Matías Abelairas	28	(Argentina)	2014 (W)	11	11	0	0	0	0	0	0	N/A	Free
77	Andrei Enescu	25	(Romania)	2013	18	16	2	0	0	0	0	0	2016	Free
Forwards
7	Mauricio Cuero	20	(Colombia)	2014 (W)	8	8	0	0	0	0	0	0	N/A	Free
19	Mike Temwanjera (captain)	31	(Zimbabwe)	2007 (W)	200	172	11	17	49	39	5	5	2014	€200,000
29	Adrian Pătulea	28	(Romania)	2013	27	25	2	0	2	1	1	0	N/A	Free
40	Alexandru Buziuc	19	(Romania)	2013 (W)	15	14	1	0	0	0	0	0	2018	€30,000

== Transfers ==
=== Summer ===
==== Transfers in ====
#	Position	Player	Transferred from	Fee	Date	Source
2	DF	(Spain) César Ortiz	(Spain) Atlético Madrid B	Free	27 July 2013	
3	DF	(Romania) Nicolae Muşat	(Romania) Dinamo București	Free	4 September 2013	
10	MF	(Romania) Leonard Manole	(Romania) Argeş Piteşti	Free	14 September 2013	
11	FW	(Germany) Denis Pozder	(Germany) Alemannia Aachen	Free	11 July 2013	
16	MF	(Portugal) Nuno Viveiros	(Romania) Braşov	Free	1 July 2013	
21	MF	(Poland) Jakub Wilk	(Lithuania) Žalgiris Vilnius	Free	5 July 2013	
22	GK	(Romania) Octavian Ormenişan	(Romania) Sportul Studenţesc	Free	7 August 2013	
25	MF	(Slovenia) Anej Lovrečič	(Slovenia) Olimpija Ljubljana	Free	8 July 2013	
28	MF	(Brazil) Madson	(Brazil) Atlético Goianiense	Free	5 August 2013	
29	FW	(Romania) Adrian Pătulea	(Romania) CSMS Iaşi	Free	9 September 2013	
70	DF	(Croatia) Igor Prahić	(Croatia) Zadar	Free	4 September 2013	
77	MF	(Romania) Andrei Enescu	(Romania) Gloria Bistriţa	Free	2 August 2013	

==== Transfers out ====
#	Position	Player	Transferred to	Fee	Date	Source
1	GK	(Romania) Dănuţ Coman	(Romania) Astra Giurgiu	Released	26 July 2013	
3	DF	(Cape Verde) Fernando Varela	(Romania) Steaua București	€1,250,000	2 September 2013	
5	MF	(Moldova) Denis Zmeu		Ended contract	30 June 2013	
10	MF	(Romania) Nicolae Stanciu	(Romania) Steaua București	€700,000	30 June 2013	
11	MF	(Senegal) Emile Paul Tendeng	(Senegal) Casa Sports	Loan return	30 June 2013	
20	DF	(Bulgaria) Zhivko Milanov	(Russia) Tom Tomsk	Ended contract	30 June 2013	
30	MF	(Romania) Raul Costin	(Azerbaijan) Simurq	Ended contract	30 June 2013	
33	DF	(Cyprus) Elias Charalambous	(Cyprus) Doxa Katokopias	Ended contract	30 June 2013	
70	MF	(North Macedonia) Nderim Nexhipi	(North Macedonia) FK Shkëndija	Released	13 August 2013	
78	MF	(Senegal) Ousmane N'Doye	(Romania) Săgeata Năvodari	Ended contract	30 June 2013	

==== Loans out ====
#	Position	Player	To club	Start date	End date	Source
6	DF	(Romania) Valter Heil	(Romania) ASA Târgu Mureş	2 September 2013	30 June 2014	
9	FW	(Romania) Ionuţ Jitaru	(Romania) CSM Moineşti	1 July 2013	30 June 2014	
20	FW	(Romania) Vasile Buhăescu	(Romania) ASA Târgu Mureş	2 September 2013	30 June 2014	

== Statistics ==
=== Appearances and goals ===
Last updated on 11 May 2014.

No.	Pos	Nat	Player	Total		Liga I		Cupa României	
No.	Pos	Nat	Player	Apps	Goals	Apps	Goals	Apps	Goals
2	MF	(Romania) ROU	Andrei Sluser	1	0	0+1	0	0	0
4	DF	(Romania) ROU	Andrei Cordoş	12	0	10	0	2	0
7	FW	(Colombia) COL	Mauricio Cuero	8	0	2+6	0	0	0
8	MF	(Romania) ROU	Liviu Antal	33	16	31	15	2	1
10	MF	(Romania) ROU	Leonard Manole	3	0	0+2	0	1	0
11	MF	(Romania) ROU	Paul Popa	1	0	0+1	0	0	0
15	MF	(Romania) ROU	Adrian Neniţă	3	0	0+2	0	1	0
17	MF	(Romania) ROU	Sergiu Popovici	8	0	2+6	0	0	0
19	FW	(Zimbabwe) ZIM	Mike Temwanjera	31	7	29	5	2	2
20	DF	(Romania) ROU	Nicolae Muşat	23	1	18+2	1	2+1	0
21	DF	(Romania) ROU	Ionuţ Balaur	17	1	12+3	1	1+1	0
25	MF	(Argentina) ARG	Franco Razzotti	10	0	10	0	0	0
28	MF	(Brazil) BRA	Madson	27	3	23+2	2	2	1
29	FW	(Romania) ROU	Adrian Pătulea	27	2	17+8	1	1+1	1
38	MF	(Argentina) ARG	Matías Abelairas	11	0	11	0	0	0
40	FW	(Romania) ROU	Alexandru Buziuc	13	0	2+10	0	1	0
67	DF	(Romania) ROU	Marius Mareş	3	0	1+2	0	0	0
70	DF	(Croatia) CRO	Igor Prahić	18	0	14+1	0	3	0
77	MF	(Romania) ROU	Andrei Enescu	18	0	3+13	0	1+1	0
89	GK	(Romania) ROU	Cătălin Straton	8	-12	7+1	-12	0	0
Players sold or loaned out during the season
2	DF	(Spain) ESP	César Ortiz	18	1	16	1	1+1	0
3	DF	(Cape Verde) CPV	Fernando Varela	5	0	5	0	0	0
5	DF	(Poland) POL	Piotr Celeban	28	6	26	4	2	2
7	MF	(Romania) ROU	Lucian Sânmărtean	19	0	16	0	2+1	0
9	FW	(Romania) ROU	Sabrin Sburlea	1	0	0+1	0	0	0
11	DF	(Brazil) BRA	Gil Bahia	10	0	7+3	0	0	0
11	FW	(Germany) GER	Denis Pozder	7	0	2+4	0	0+1	0
12	GK	(Lithuania) LTU	Vytautas Černiauskas	28	-19	25	-14	3	-5
16	MF	(Portugal) POR	Nuno Viveiros	25	3	22+2	3	1	0
18	MF	(Brazil) BRA	Cauê	19	2	17	2	2	0
20	FW	(Romania) ROU	Vasile Buhăescu	3	0	2+1	0	0	0
21	MF	(Poland) POL	Jakub Wilk	15	1	11+2	1	0+2	0
23	DF	(Romania) ROU	Adrian Sălăgeanu	17	1	15	1	2	0
25	MF	(Slovenia) SLO	Anej Lovrečič	12	0	7+4	0	1	0
Statistics of the FC Vaslui players playing for another team
6	DF	(Romania) ROU	Valter Heil for ASA Târgu Mureș	15	1	13+1	1	1	0
9	MF	(Romania) ROU	Ionuţ Jitaru for CSM Moinești	1	0	0	0	1	0
20	FW	(Romania) ROU	Vasile Buhăescu for ASA Târgu Mureș	20	2	16+3	2	0+1	0

Converted penalties
Player	Pen.
(Romania) Liviu Antal	6

=== Top scorers ===
Position	Nation	Number	Name	Liga I	Romanian Cup	Total
1	(Romania)	8	Liviu Antal	13	1	14
2	(Zimbabwe)	19	Mike Temwanjera	5	2	7
3	(Poland)	5	Piotr Celeban	4	2	6
4	(Portugal)	16	Nuno Viveiros	3	0	3
4	(Brazil)	28	Madson	2	1	3
6	(Brazil)	18	Cauê	2	0	2
6	(Romania)	29	Adrian Pătulea	1	1	2
8	(Spain)	2	César Ortiz	1	0	1
8	(Romania)	20	Nicolae Muşat	1	0	1
8	(Romania)	21	Ionuţ Balaur	1	0	1
8	(Poland)	21	Jakub Wilk	1	0	1
8	(Romania)	23	Adrian Sălăgeanu	1	0	1
			TOTALS	35	7	42

Penalties inflicted
Player	Pen.
(Romania) Cătălin Straton	1
(Portugal) Nuno Viveiros	1

Penalties obtained
Player	Pen.
(Romania) Adrian Pătulea	1

=== Disciplinary record ===
No.	Pos	Name	Liga I			Cupa României			Total		
No.	Pos	Name	(yellow card)	(yellow card) (yellow-red card)	(red card)	Yellow card	(yellow card) (yellow-red card)	Red card	Yellow card	(yellow card) (yellow-red card)	Red card
2	DF	César Ortiz	1	0	0	0	0	0	1	0	0
4	DF	Andrei Cordoș	1	0	0	0	0	0	1	0	0
7	MF	Mauricio Cuero	1	0	0	0	0	0	1	0	0
8	MF	Liviu Antal	4	0	0	0	0	0	4	0	0
11	DF	Gil Bahia	1	0	0	0	0	0	1	0	0
12	GK	Vytautas Černiauskas	2	0	1	0	0	0	2	0	1
16	MF	Nuno Viveiros	3	1	0	0	0	0	3	1	0
17	MF	Sergiu Popovici	1	0	0	0	0	0	1	0	0
19	FW	Mike Temwanjera	5	0	1	0	0	0	5	0	1
20	DF	Nicolae Mușat	1	0	0	0	0	0	1	0	0
21	DF	Ionuț Balaur	3	0	0	0	0	0	3	0	0
25	MF	Franco Razzotti	2	0	0	0	0	0	2	0	0
28	MF	Madson	5	1	0	0	0	0	5	1	0
29	FW	Adrian Pătulea	1	0	0	0	0	0	1	0	0
38	MF	Matías Abelairas	1	0	0	0	0	0	1	0	0
70	DF	Igor Prahić	3	0	1	2	0	0	5	0	1
77	MF	Andrei Enescu	4	0	0	1	0	0	5	0	0
89	GK	Cătălin Straton	0	0	1	0	0	0	0	0	1
Players sold or loaned out during the season
3	DF	Fernando Varela	1	0	0	0	0	0	1	0	0
5	DF	Piotr Celeban	2	0	0	0	0	0	2	0	0
7	MF	Lucian Sânmărtean	6	0	1	0	0	0	6	0	1
18	MF	Cauê	0	0	0	1	0	0	1	0	0
21	MF	Jakub Wilk	3	0	0	0	0	0	3	0	0
23	DF	Adrian Sălăgeanu	5	0	0	0	0	0	5	0	0
		TOTALS	56	2	5	4	0	0	60	2	5

Captains
Player	Liga I	Cup	Total
(Romania) Lucian Sânmărtean	16	2	18
(Zimbabwe) Mike Temwanjera	6	0	6
(Romania) Liviu Antal	5	0	5
(Romania) Adrian Sălăgeanu	1	0	1
(Lithuania) Vytautas Černiauskas	0	1	1

=== Overall ===
Games played	8 (7 Liga I, 1 Romanian Cup)
Games won	4 (3 Liga I, 1 Romanian Cup)
Games drawn	2 (2 Liga I)
Games lost	2 (2 Liga I)
Goals scored	9
Goals conceded	5
Goal difference	+4
Yellow cards	15
Red cards	3
Worst discipline	Lucian Sânmărtean with 4 (yellow card)
Best result	4–0 (H) v CFR Cluj – Liga I – 5 Aug 2013
Worst result	0–2 (A) v Dinamo București – Liga I – 28 Jul 2013
Most appearances	6 players with 7 appearances
Top scorer	Piotr Celeban and Liviu Antal with 3 goals
Points	11/21 (52.38%)

Last updated: 24 September 2013
Source: Statistics

==== Performances ====
Updated to games played on 24 September 2013.

	All								Home						Away					
	Pld	Pts	W	D	L	GF	GA	GD	W	D	L	GF	GA	GD	W	D	L	GF	GA	GD
League	7	11	3	2	2	8	5	+3	3	0	0	6	0	+6	0	2	2	2	5	-3
Overall	8	–	4	2	2	9	5	+4	4	0	0	7	0	+7	0	2	2	2	5	-3

==== Goal minutes ====
Updated to games played on 24 September 2013.

1'–15'	16'–30'	31'–HT	46'–60'	61'–75'	76'–FT	Extra time
4	2	1	1	0	1	0

== Liga I ==
=== League table ===
Pos	Team	Pld	W	D	L	GF	GA	GD	Pts	Qualification or relegation
4	Dinamo București	34	17	8	9	52	34	+18	59	(Note: Vaslui did not receive a license for financial reasons. Dinamo București filed for insolvency, thus didn't get an UEFA licence. CFR Cluj got their Europa League spot.)
5	CFR Cluj	34	13	12	9	44	33	+11	51	Qualification to Europa League second qualifying round
6	Vaslui (R)	34	15	6	13	38	32	+6	51	Relegation to Liga IV
7	Pandurii Târgu Jiu	34	14	8	12	59	39	+20	50	
8	Botoșani	34	12	7	15	36	52	−16	43	

Source: Liga I (in Romanian)
Rules for classification: 1) points; 2) goal difference; 3) number of goals scored.
(R) Relegated

=== Results summary ===
Overall								Home						Away					
Pld	W	D	L	GF	GA	GD	Pts	W	D	L	GF	GA	GD	W	D	L	GF	GA	GD
28	14	6	8	36	19	+17	48	8	4	3	24	7	+17	6	2	5	12	12	0

=== Results by round ===
Round	1	2	3	4	5	6	7	8	9	10	11	12	13	14	15	16	17	18	19	20	21	22	23	24	25	26	27	28	29	30	31	32	33	34
Ground	H	A	H	A	H	A	H	A	A	H	A	H	A	H	A	H	A	A	H	A	H	A	H	A	H	H	A	H	A	H	A	H	A	H
Result	D	L	W	D	W	L	W	D	L	L	L	W	W	D	W	D	W	L	W	D	W	W	L	W	W	L	W	W						
Position	15	15	10	11	8	12	7	7	11	11	11	11	11	11	8	8	6	6	6	6	5	5	5	5	4	5	5	5						

Updated to match(es) played on 19 April 2014. Source: LPF
A = Away; H = Home; W = Win; D = Draw; L = Loss

== Matches ==
=== Liga I ===
27 November 2013 Matchday 1	Vaslui	0–0	Concordia Chiajna	Vaslui
16:00 EET	Sânmărtean (yellow card) 23'; Prahić (yellow card) 56'; Madson (yellow card) 75'	Summary	Bambara (yellow card) 33'; Onduku (yellow card) 43'; Welington Carlos da Silva (yellow card) 58'; Melinte (red card) 64'; Dima (yellow card) 90+2'	Stadium: Municipal; Attendance: 1,000; Referee: (Romania) Lucian Ruşandu

28 July 2013 Matchday 2	Dinamo București	2–0	Vaslui	București
21:30 EET	Rotariu 57'; Matei 96' (pen.)	Report		Stadium: Dinamo; Attendance: 10 684; Referee: Alexandru Tudor

5 August 2013 Matchday 3	Vaslui	4–0	CFR Cluj	Vaslui
21:30 EET	Celeban 4'; Antal 5', 25'; Cauê 33'	Report		Stadium: Municipal; Attendance: 4 000; Referee: Sebastian Colţescu

12 August 2013 Matchday 4	Gaz Metan Mediaş	1–1	Vaslui	Mediaş
20:30 EET	Robertson 54' (pen.)	Report	Cauê 94'	Stadium: Gaz Metan; Attendance: 1 000; Referee: Ovidiu Haţegan

19 August 2013 Matchday 5	Vaslui	1–0	Săgeata Năvodari	Vaslui
21:30 EET	Celeban 26'	Report		Stadium: Municipal; Attendance: 4 000; Referee: George Rădulescu

25 August 2013 Matchday 6	Botoşani	1–0	Vaslui	Botoșani
17:30 EET	Codoban 80'	Report		Stadium: Municipal; Attendance: 7 500; Referee: Cristian Balaj

16 September 2013 Matchday 7	Vaslui	1–0	Poli Timișoara	Vaslui
21:30 EET	Celeban 15'	Report		Stadium: Municipal; Attendance: 2 000; Referee: Marius Avram

21 September 2013 Matchday 8	Braşov	1–1	Vaslui	Braşov
19:00 EET	Surdu 42'	Report	Antal 12' (pen.)	Stadium: Silviu Ploeşteanu; Attendance: 500; Referee: Istvan Kovacs

29 September 2013 Matchday 9	Viitorul Constanţa	2–0	Vaslui	Chiajna
19:00 EET	Larie (yellow card) 28'; Axente 66' (pen.) 78'; Emerson (yellow card) 87'	Summary	Prahić (red card) 65'; Wilk (yellow card) 74'	Stadium: Concordia; Attendance: 600; Referee: (Romania) Marius Bocăneală

5 October 2013 Matchday 10	Vaslui	0–1	Steaua București	Vaslui
19:30 EET	Madson (yellow card) 25' (yellow-red card); Sălăgeanu (yellow card) 35'; Černiauskas (red card) 72'; Sânmărtean (red card) 85'	Summary	Tănase (yellow card) 44'; Gardoș (yellow card) 45'; Piovaccari 47'; Bourceanu (yellow card) 81'	Stadium: Municipal; Attendance: 3,000; Referee: (Romania) Sebastian Colțescu

18 October 2013 Matchday 11	Corona Braşov	2–1	Vaslui	Braşov
19:45 EET	Buș 17'; Brata 23'; Vranjković (yellow card) 28'; Marius Burlacu (yellow card) 45'; Dâlbea (red card) 70'; Marc (yellow card) 71'	Summary	Enescu (yellow card) 26'; Antal 45' (pen.); Sălăgeanu (yellow card) 56'	Stadium: Silviu Ploeşteanu; Attendance: 250; Referee: (Romania) George Rădulescu

25 October 2013 Matchday 12	Vaslui	2–0	Universitatea Cluj	Vaslui
21:30 EET	Madson 12'; Antal 51' (pen.); Sălăgeanu (yellow card) 80'	Summary	Mendy (yellow card) 6'; Abrudan (yellow card) 63'; Veselovsky (yellow card) 64'; Borza (yellow card) 90+2'	Stadium: Municipal; Attendance: 2,500; Referee: (Romania) Cristian Balaj

2 November 2013 Matchday 13	Pandurii Târgu Jiu	1–2	Vaslui	Târgu Jiu
18:00 EET	Christou (yellow card) 4' (yellow-red card); Eric Pereira (yellow card) 6'; Momčilović 29'; Erico (yellow card) 63'	Summary	Prahić (yellow card) 25'; Sânmărtean (yellow card) 49'; Nuno Viveiros (yellow card) 60'; Antal 67', 90+2'; Madson (yellow card) 90'	Stadium: Tudor Vladimirescu; Attendance: 4,000; Referee: (Romania) Istvan Kovacs

8 November 2013 Matchday 14	Vaslui	1–1	Petrolul Ploieşti	Vaslui
19:00 EET	Antal 27'; Gilmerson dos Santos Mota (yellow card) 33'; Temwanjera (yellow card) 39'; Sălăgeanu (yellow card) 44'	Summary	Geraldo Alves (yellow card) 24'; Doré 31'; Priso (yellow card) 44'	Stadium: Municipal; Attendance: 5,000; Referee: (Romania) Radu Petrescu

22 November 2013 Matchday 15	Oţelul Galaţi	1–2	Vaslui	Galaţi
21:00 EET	Šipović (yellow card) 13'; Giurgiu (yellow card) 16'; Iorga (yellow card) 65'; Marquinhos Carioca (yellow card) 70' (goal) 90+3' (pen.); Cooper (yellow card) 72'; Brăneț (yellow card) 84'	Summary	Temwanjera (yellow card) 2'; Wilk 28' (yellow card) 66'; Antal (yellow card) 84' (goal) 85' (pen.)	Stadium: Oţelul; Attendance: 1,000; Referee: (Romania) Catalin Popa

30 November 2013 Matchday 16	Vaslui	3–0	Ceahlăul Piatra Neamţ	Vaslui
19:00 EET	Sălăgeanu 3'; Temwanjera 73'; Antal 84'	Summary		Stadium: Municipal; Attendance: 1,000; Referee: (Romania) Istvan Kovacs

9 December 2013 Matchday 17	Astra Giurgiu	1–0	Vaslui	Giurgiu
21:00 EET	Budescu (yellow card) 14'; Yazalde 30'; Laban (yellow card) 61'; Găman (yellow card) 72'	Summary	Madson (yellow card) 11'; Sălăgeanu (yellow card) 45'; Temwanjera (yellow card) 81'	Stadium: Marin Anastasovici; Attendance: 1,700; Referee: (Romania) Ovidiu Hațegan

13 December 2013 Matchday 18	Concordia Chiajna	0–1	Vaslui	Chiajna
17:30 EET		Summary	César Ortiz (yellow card) 33'; Pătulea 70'; Nuno Viveiros (yellow card) 76'; Mușat (yellow card) 90+4'	Stadium: Concordia; Attendance: 500; Referee: (Romania) George Găman

17 December 2013 Matchday 19	Vaslui	1–1	Dinamo București	Vaslui
20:45 EET	Antal 44' (pen.)	Summary	Țucudean 76'	Stadium: Municipal; Attendance: 3,500; Referee: (Romania) Marius Avram

23 February 2014 Matchday 20	CFR Cluj	0–0	Vaslui	Cluj-Napoca
18:00 EET	Cadú (yellow card) 8'; Aitor Monroy Rueda (red card) 49'	Summary	Razzotti (yellow card) 72'; Balaur (yellow card) 89'	Stadium: Dr. Constantin Rădulescu; Attendance: 5,000; Referee: (Romania) Ovidiu Hațegan

3 March 2014 Matchday 21	Vaslui	1–0	Gaz Metan Mediaş	Vaslui
21:00 EET	Balaur (yellow card) 44'; Nuno Viveiros 76'; César Ortiz (yellow card) 89'; Enescu (yellow card) 89'	Summary	Zaharia (yellow card) 18'; Trtovac (yellow card) 33'	Stadium: Municipal; Attendance: 1,200; Referee: (Romania) Catalin Popa

10 March 2014 Matchday 22	Săgeata Năvodari	0–1	Vaslui	Constanţa
18:00 EET	Peteleu (yellow card) 28'; Fonsi (yellow card) 50'	Summary	Celeban (yellow card) 29'; Razzotti (yellow card) 83'; Temwanjera 84'	Stadium: Farul; Attendance: 100; Referee: (Romania) George Rădulescu

17 March 2014 Matchday 23	Vaslui	0–1	Botoşani	Vaslui
18:30 EET	Nuno Viveiros (yellow card) 79'	Summary	Croitoru (red card) 72'; Cristian Danci 80'	Stadium: Municipal; Attendance: 2,000; Referee: (Romania) Istvan Kovacs

24 March 2014 Matchday 24	Poli Timișoara	0–2	Vaslui	Timișoara
18:30 EET	Danijel Morariju (yellow card) 45'; Mera (yellow card) 67'; Petrović (yellow card) 70'; Gueye Mansour (yellow card) 82' (yellow-red card)	Summary	Balaur (yellow card) 12'; Celeban 16'; Cuero (yellow card) 40'; Nuno Viveiros 73'; Gil Bahia (yellow card) 86'	Stadium: Dan Păltinişanu; Attendance: 400; Referee: (Romania) Radu Petrescu

31 March 2014 Matchday 25	Vaslui	1–0	Braşov	Vaslui
19:00 EET	Antal (yellow card) 19'; César Ortiz 61'; Madson (yellow card) 63'; Celeban (yellow card) 76'; Černiauskas (yellow card) 90+1'	Summary	Mateiu (yellow card) 60'; Ricardo Machado (yellow card) 72'	Stadium: Municipal; Attendance: 1,000; Referee: (Romania) Ovidiu Hațegan

4 April 2014 Matchday 26	Vaslui	0–1	Viitorul Constanţa	Vaslui
21:00 EET	Enescu (yellow card) 82'	Summary	Florin Tănase 87'	Stadium: Municipal; Attendance: 1,000; Referee: (Romania) George Găman

11 April 2014 Matchday 27	Steaua București	0–1	Vaslui	București
19:30 EET		Report	Temwanjera 85'	Stadium: Arena Naţională; Attendance: 3 154; Referee: Andrei Chivulete

19 April 2014 Matchday 28	Vaslui	8–1	Corona Braşov	Vaslui
17:00 EET	Madson 21'; Antal 21' (pen.), 65'; Balaur 41'; Viveiros 45+1'; Temwanjera 54', 56'; Mușat 87'	Report	Forika 39'	Stadium: Municipal; Referee: Horia Mladinovici

26 April 2014 Matchday 29	Universitatea Cluj	1–0	Vaslui	Cluj-Napoca
18:45	Maximilian Nicu 12'	Report		Stadium: Cluj Arena; Referee: Adrian Comănescu

3 May 2014 Matchday 30	Vaslui	1–0	Pandurii Târgu Jiu	Vaslui
19:00	Madson (yellow card) 22'; Antal 60'; Enescu (yellow card) 76'	Report	Momčilović (yellow card) 43'; Anton (yellow card) 51'	Stadium: Municipal; Attendance: 1,100; Referee: (Romania) Adrian Illyeş

7 May 2014 Matchday 31	Petrolul Ploieşti	3–0	Vaslui	Ploieşti
19:30	Tamuz 22', 54'; Albín (yellow card) 42'; Mutu 64'	Summary	Madson (yellow card) 81'	Stadium: Ilie Oană; Attendance: 9,000; Referee: (Romania) George Rădulescu

11 May 2014 Matchday 32	Vaslui	1–4	Oţelul Galaţi	Vaslui
15:30	Antal 39' (yellow card) 49'; Prahić (yellow card) 45'	Summary	Henrique 2' 10'; Marquinhos Carioca 31' 45' (pen.)	Stadium: Municipal; Attendance: 1,200; Referee: (Romania) Adrian Comănescu

17 May 2014 Matchday 33	Ceahlăul Piatra Neamţ	2–0	Vaslui	Piatra Neamţ
15:00	Achim 9'; Jula 21'	Summary	Balaur (yellow card) 68'	Stadium: Ceahlăul; Attendance: 1,500; Referee: (Romania) George Găman

19 May 2014 Matchday 34	Vaslui	1–4	Astra Giurgiu	Vaslui
19:00	Temwanjera (yellow card) 14'; Enescu (yellow card) 52'; Mureșan 79' (o.g.)	Summary	Alibec (yellow card) 21' (goal) 54' 62'; Cristescu 43'; Seto 49'; Ivanovski (yellow card) 87'	Stadium: Municipal; Attendance: 500; Referee: (Romania) Robert Dumitru

=== Cupa României ===
24 September 2013 Round of 32	Vaslui	1–0	Metalul Reşiţa	Vaslui
16:00 EET	Pătulea 53'			Stadium: Municipal; Attendance: 700; Referee: Gabriel Bârjac

29 October 2013 Round of 16	Vaslui	4–1	FC Botoșani	Vaslui
18:30 EET	Temwanjera 18', 57'; Madson 23'; Prahić (yellow card) 70'; Antal 82'	Summary	Vraciu 7'; Vașvari (yellow card) 56'	Stadium: Municipal; Attendance: 2,000; Referee: (Romania) Catalin Popa

4 December 2013 Quarterfinals	Petrolul Ploiești	4–2 (a.e.t.)	Vaslui	Ploiești
18:30 EET	Filipe Teixeira (yellow card) 17'; Walter Fernández 37'; Guilherme (yellow card) 79'; Hoban 90+3'; Geraldo Alves 98'; Romário Pires 103'	Summary	Gil Bahia (yellow card) 22'; Celeban 27', 70'; Prahić (yellow card) 33'	Stadium: Stadionul Ilie Oană; Attendance: 8,000; Referee: (Romania) Cristian Balaj
