= 2021 UAE Team Emirates season =

UAE Team Emirates
- 2021 season
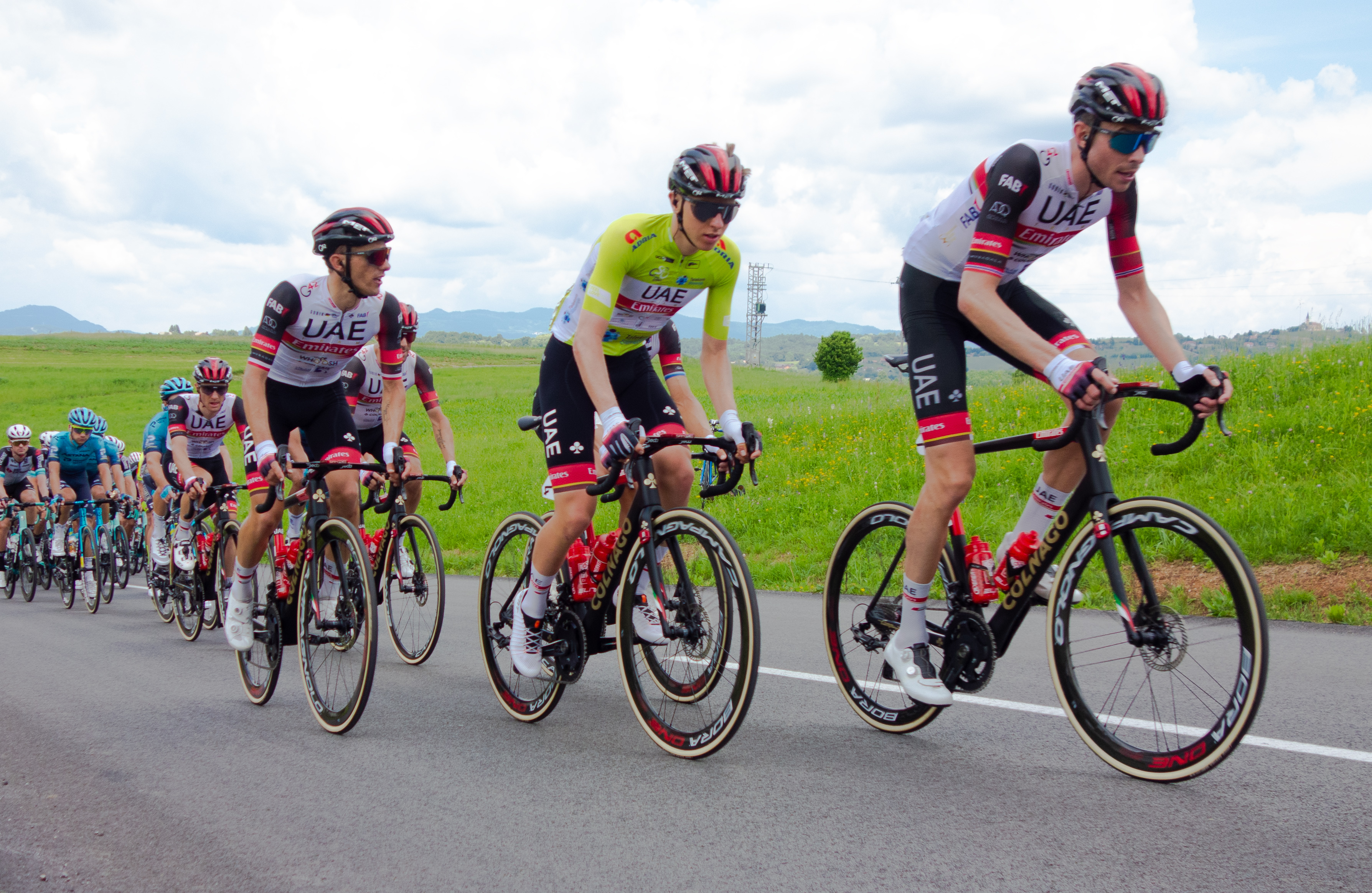
- UAE Team Emirates on Stage 3 of the Tour of Slovenia, with race leader Tadej Pogačar (green jersey)
- UCI code: UAD
- Status: UCI WorldTeam
- World Tour Rank: 4th
- Manager: José Antonio Fernández (ESP)
- Main sponsor(s): Emirates
- Based: United Arab Emirates
- Bicycles: Colnago
- Groupset: Campagnolo

Season victories
- One-day races: 5
- Stage race overall: 5
- Stage race stages: 20
- Grand Tours: 1
- National Championships: 3
- Most wins: Tadej Pogačar (SLO) (19)
- Best ranked rider: Tadej Pogačar (SLO) (1st)
- Jersey

The 2021 road bicycle racing season for UAE Team Emirates was the 23rd season in the team's existence and the fifth under the current name. The team has been a UCI WorldTeam since 2005, when the tier was first established.

== Team roster ==
As of 1 August 2021.

Rider	Date of birth
Andres Camilo Ardila (COL)	2 June 1999 (aged 21)
Juan Ayuso (Note: Ayuso spent the first half of the year with Team Colpack–Ballan before joining the team on 1 July.) (ESP)	16 September 2002 (aged 18)
Mikkel Bjerg (DEN)	3 November 1998 (aged 22)
Sven Erik Bystrøm (NOR)	21 January 1992 (aged 28)
Valerio Conti (ITA)	30 March 1993 (aged 27)
Alessandro Covi (ITA)	28 September 1998 (aged 22)
Rui Costa (POR)	5 October 1986 (aged 34)
David de la Cruz (ESP)	6 May 1989 (aged 31)
Joe Dombrowski (USA)	12 May 1991 (aged 29)
Finn Fisher-Black (Note: Fisher-Black joined from the Jumbo–Visma Development Team on 21 July 2021.) (NZL)	21 December 2001 (aged 19)
Davide Formolo (ITA)	25 September 1992 (aged 28)
Fernando Gaviria (COL)	19 August 1994 (aged 26)
Ryan Gibbons (RSA)	13 August 1994 (aged 26)
Felix Groß (Note: Groß joined as a stagiaire from Rad-Net Rose Team on 1 August.) (GER)	4 September 1998 (aged 22)
Marc Hirschi (Note: After Hirschi's contract with Team DSM was terminated with immediate effect on 5 January, he joined UAE Team Emirates on 9 January.) (SUI)	24 August 1998 (aged 22)
Alexander Kristoff (NOR)	5 July 1987 (aged 33)

Rider	Date of birth
Vegard Stake Laengen (NOR)	7 February 1989 (aged 31)
Rafał Majka (POL)	12 September 1989 (aged 31)
Marco Marcato (ITA)	11 February 1984 (aged 36)
Brandon McNulty (USA)	2 April 1998 (aged 22)
Yousif Mirza (UAE)	8 October 1988 (aged 32)
Juan Sebastián Molano (COL)	4 November 1994 (aged 26)
Cristian Camilo Muñoz (COL)	20 March 1996 (aged 24)
Ivo Oliveira (POR)	5 September 1996 (aged 24)
Rui Oliveira (POR)	5 September 1996 (aged 24)
Tadej Pogačar (SLO)	21 September 1998 (aged 22)
Jan Polanc (SLO)	6 May 1992 (aged 28)
Alexandr Riabushenko (BLR)	12 October 1995 (aged 25)
Maximiliano Richeze (ARG)	7 March 1983 (aged 37)
Matteo Trentin (ITA)	2 August 1989 (aged 31)
Oliviero Troia (ITA)	1 September 1994 (aged 26)
Diego Ulissi (ITA)	15 July 1989 (aged 31)

Riders who joined the team for the 2021 season

Rider	2020 team
Juan Ayuso	neo-pro (Team Colpack–Ballan)
Finn Fisher-Black	Jumbo–Visma Development Team
Ryan Gibbons	NTT Pro Cycling
Marc Hirschi	Team DSM
Rafał Majka	Bora–Hansgrohe
Matteo Trentin	CCC Team

Riders who left the team during or after the 2020 season

Rider	2021 team
Fabio Aru	Team Qhubeka Assos
Tom Bohli	Cofidis
Sergio Henao	Team Qhubeka Assos
Jasper Philipsen	Alpecin–Fenix
Edward Ravasi	Eolo–Kometa

== Season victories ==
Date	Race	Competition	Rider	Country	Location	Ref.
23 February	UAE Tour, Stage 3	UCI World Tour	Tadej Pogačar (SLO)	United Arab Emirates	Jebel Hafeet	
27 February	UAE Tour, Overall	UCI World Tour	Tadej Pogačar (SLO)	United Arab Emirates		
27 February	UAE Tour, Young rider classification	UCI World Tour	Tadej Pogačar (SLO)	United Arab Emirates		
27 February	UAE Tour, Team classification	UCI World Tour	(Note: The riders in the squad were Mikkel Bjerg, Davide Formolo, Fernando Gaviria, Rafał Majka, Tadej Pogačar, Jan Polanc, and Maximiliano Richeze.)	United Arab Emirates		
13 March	Tirreno–Adriatico, Stage 4	UCI World Tour	Tadej Pogačar (SLO)	Italy	Prati di Tivo	
16 March	Tirreno–Adriatico, Overall	UCI World Tour	Tadej Pogačar (SLO)	Italy		
16 March	Tirreno–Adriatico, Mountains classification	UCI World Tour	Tadej Pogačar (SLO)	Italy		
16 March	Tirreno–Adriatico, Young rider classification	UCI World Tour	Tadej Pogačar (SLO)	Italy		
7 April	Tour of the Basque Country, Stage 3	UCI World Tour	Tadej Pogačar (SLO)	Spain	Ermualde (Laudio)	
25 April	Liège–Bastogne–Liège	UCI World Tour	Tadej Pogačar (SLO)	Belgium	Liège	
11 May	Giro d'Italia, Stage 4	UCI World Tour	Joe Dombrowski (USA)	Italy	Sestola	
13 May	Trofeo Calvia	UCI Europe Tour	Ryan Gibbons (RSA)	Spain	Palma Nova	
10 June	Tour of Slovenia, Stage 2	UCI Europe Tour; UCI ProSeries	Tadej Pogačar (SLO)	Slovenia	Celje	
12 June	Tour of Slovenia, Stage 4	UCI Europe Tour; UCI ProSeries	Diego Ulissi (ITA)	Slovenia	Nova Gorica	
13 June	Tour of Slovenia, Overall	UCI Europe Tour; UCI ProSeries	Tadej Pogačar (SLO)	Slovenia		
13 June	Tour of Slovenia, Team classification	UCI Europe Tour; UCI ProSeries	(Note: The riders in the squad were Vegard Stake Laengen, Rafał Majka, Rui Oliveira, Tadej Pogačar, Jan Polanc, Matteo Trentin, and Diego Ulissi.)	Slovenia		
30 June	Tour de France, Stage 5 (ITT)	UCI World Tour	Tadej Pogačar (SLO)	France	Laval	
14 July	Tour de France, Stage 17	UCI World Tour	Tadej Pogačar (SLO)	France	Saint-Lary-Soulan (Col de Portet)	
14 July	Settimana Ciclistica Italiana, Stage 1	UCI Europe Tour	Diego Ulissi (ITA)	Italy	Sassari	
15 July	Tour de France, Stage 18	UCI World Tour	Tadej Pogačar (SLO)	France	Luz Ardiden	
17 July	Settimana Ciclistica Italiana, Stage 4	UCI Europe Tour	Diego Ulissi (ITA)	Italy	Cagliari	
18 July	Settimana Ciclistica Italiana, Overall	UCI Europe Tour	Diego Ulissi (ITA)	Italy		
18 July	Tour de France, Overall	UCI World Tour	Tadej Pogačar (SLO)	France		
18 July	Tour de France, Mountains classification	UCI World Tour	Tadej Pogačar (SLO)	France		
18 July	Tour de France, Young rider classification	UCI World Tour	Tadej Pogačar (SLO)	France		
1 August	Ronde d'Aix	UCI Europe Tour	Tadej Pogačar (SLO)	France	Aix-en-Provence	
4 August	Vuelta a Burgos, Stage 2	UCI Europe Tour; UCI ProSeries	Juan Sebastián Molano (COL)	Spain	Briviesca	
6 August	Vuelta a Burgos, Stage 4	UCI Europe Tour; UCI ProSeries	Juan Sebastián Molano (COL)	Spain	Aranda de Duero	
7 August	Vuelta a Burgos, Points classification	UCI Europe Tour; UCI ProSeries	Juan Sebastián Molano (COL)	Spain		
11 August	Tour de Pologne, Stage 3	UCI World Tour	Fernando Gaviria (COL)	Poland	Rzeszów	
27 August	Deutschland Tour, Stage 2	UCI Europe Tour; UCI ProSeries	Alexander Kristoff (NOR)	Germany	Ilmenau	
29 August	Deutschland Tour, Stage 4	UCI Europe Tour; UCI ProSeries	Alexander Kristoff (NOR)	Germany	Nuremberg	
29 August	Vuelta a España, Stage 15	UCI World Tour	Rafał Majka (POL)	Spain	El Barraco	
15 September	Tour de Luxembourg, Stage 2	UCI Europe Tour; UCI ProSeries	Marc Hirschi (SUI)	Luxembourg	Esch-sur-Sûre (Eschdorf)	
19 September	Trofeo Matteotti	UCI Europe Tour	Matteo Trentin (ITA)	Italy	Pescara	
28 September	Giro di Sicilia, Stage 1	UCI Europe Tour	Juan Sebastián Molano (COL)	Italy	Licata	
29 September	Giro di Sicilia, Stage 2	UCI Europe Tour	Juan Sebastián Molano (COL)	Italy	Mondello (Palermo)	
1 October	Giro di Sicilia, Points classification	UCI Europe Tour	Juan Sebastián Molano (COL)	Italy		
1 October	Giro di Sicilia, Young rider classification	UCI Europe Tour	Alessandro Covi (ITA)	Italy		
9 October	Il Lombardia	UCI World Tour	Tadej Pogačar (SLO)	Italy	Bergamo	

== National, Continental, and World Champions ==
Date	Discipline	Jersey	Rider	Country	Location	Ref.
6 March	United Arab Emirates National Road Race Championships		Yousif Mirza (UAE)	United Arab Emirates	Kalba	
6 March	African Continental Road Race Championships		Ryan Gibbons (RSA)	Egypt	Cairo	
6 March	African Continental Time Trial Championships		Ryan Gibbons (RSA)	Egypt	Cairo	
19 March	South African National Time Trial Championships		Ryan Gibbons (RSA)	South Africa	Swellendam	
30 March	United Arab Emirates National Time Trial Championships		Yousif Mirza (UAE)	United Arab Emirates	Al Hamriya	
