= Octavian (disambiguation) =

Octavian was the name of Augustus (63 BC – 14 AD) before he became Emperor of Rome.

Octavian or Octavianus may also refer to:

- Octavian (horse), a British horse
- Octavian, an octopus villager from the video game series Animal Crossing
- Octavian (rapper), French-British rapper
- Octavian (romance), a 14th-century Middle English poem
- Octavians, financial commissioners in 16th century Scotland
- Octavian, a character in Der Rosenkavalier
- Octavian or Gus, a mouse in Cinderella
- Octavian, a Camp Half-Blood character
- Octavius, Latin praenomen (first name)

== People with the given name ==
- Octavianus (poet), Latin poet of the 6th century AD
- Octavian Abrudan (born 1984), Romanian footballer
- Octavian Belu (born 1951), Romanian gymnastics coach
- Octavian Bodișteanu (born 1977), Moldovan politician
- Octavian Chihaia (born 1981), Romanian footballer
- Octavian Cotescu (1931–1985), Romanian actor
- Octavian Drăghici (born 1985), Romanian footballer
- Octavian Goga (1881–1938), Romanian politician, poet, and playwright
- Octavian Grigore (born 1964), Romanian footballer
- Octavian Guțu (born 1982), Moldovan swimmer
- Octavian Ionescu (footballer, born 1990), Romanian football center back
- Octavian Ionescu (footballer, born 1949), Romanian football midfielder
- Ștefan Octavian Iosif (1875–1913), Romanian poet and translator
- Octavian Nemescu (born 1940), Romanian composer
- Octavian Ormenișan (born 1992), Romanian footballer
- Octavian Paler (1926–2007), Romanian writer and activist
- Octavian Popescu (born 1938), Romanian footballer
- Octavian Popescu (born 1985), Romanian footballer
- Octavian Smigelschi (1866–1912), Austro-Hungarian Romanian painter
- Octavian Codru Tăslăuanu (1876-1942), Romanian magazine editor and politician
- Octavian Țîcu (born 1972), Moldovan politician
- Octavian Utalea (1868–?), Romanian politician
- Octavian Vintilă (born 1938), Romanian fencer
- Octavian Zidaru (born 1953), Romanian fencer
- Octavian, birth name of Pope John XII
- Octavian, the Antipope Victor IV (1159–1164)
