= Octavien =

Octavien is both a given name and surname. Notable people with the name include:

- Octavien de Saint-Gelais (1468–1502), French churchman, poet, and translator
- Steve Octavien (born 1984), American football player

== See also ==
- Octavian (disambiguation)
