= Mubazzara Dam =

Historical dam near Jebel Hafeet in Al-Ain, the UAE

The Mubazzara Dam (Arabic: سدّ مُبَزَّرَة, romanized: Sudd Mubazzara) is located at the foothills of Jabal Hafit in Al Ain, the Eastern Region of the Emirate of Abu Dhabi, the UAE. It has been dubbed 'the oldest water installation in Abu Dhabi's recent history'.

== Description ==
The dam was one of a number of development projects undertaken by Sheikh Zayed bin Sultan Al Nahyan in his time as governor of Al Ain, before his accession as Ruler of Abu Dhabi in 1966, and appointment as the first President of the UAE in 1971. First constructed in 1955, the dam was restored fifty years later in 2005 by a team from the Department of Antiquities and Tourism in Al Ain.

The dam was the first attempt to harness the water flowing off Jebel Hafit during the rainy winter season, but was superseded by the drilling of the deep well and construction of a man-made geyser at the centre of the Green Mubazzara tourist resort. This well has, in turn, depleted the water flow to the nearby Ain Al Faydah hot springs.

The dam was the subject of a watercolour by celebrated Emirati artist, Abdu Kader Al Rais, now owned by the UAE's president, Sheikh Mohammad bin Zayed Al Nahyan.

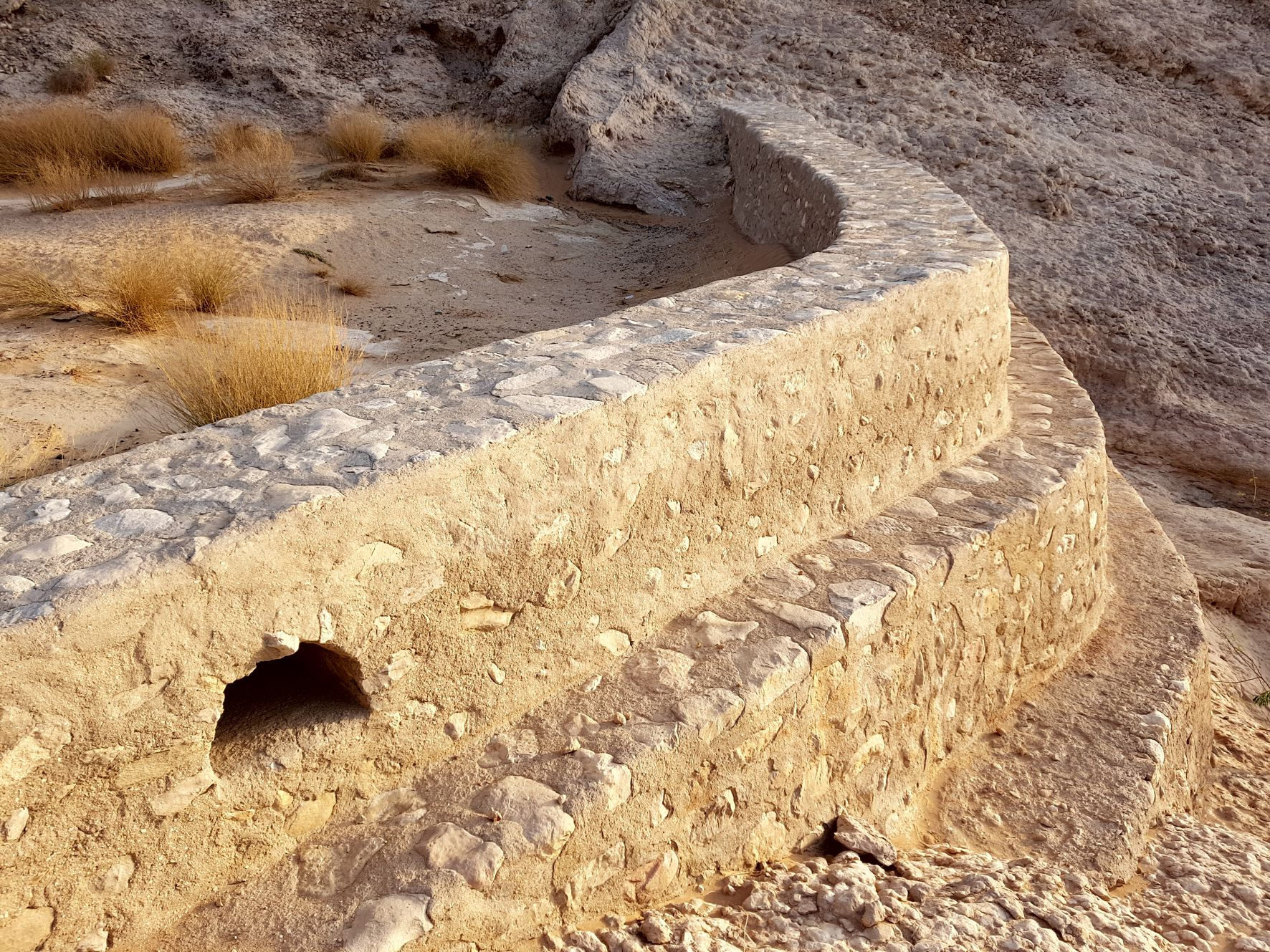
The dam at Jebel Hafit was constructed in 1955 and was a pioneering attempt to harness the region's water resources for irrigation

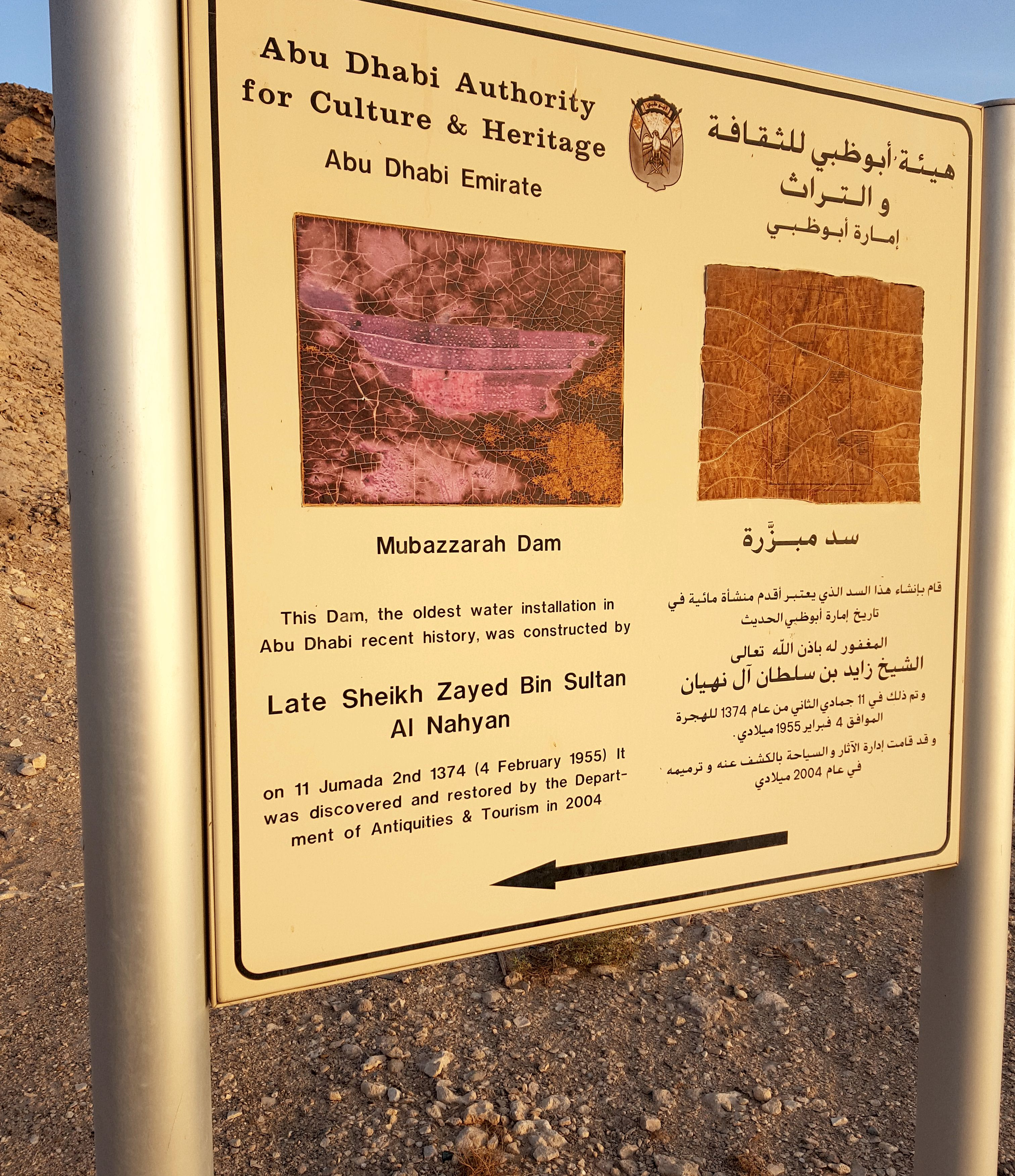
The sign at Mubazzara Dam proclaims it as the "oldest water installation" in the recent history of Abu Dhabi
