= Adrian Pătulea =

Romanian footballer

Personal information
- Full name: Adrian Marian Pătulea
- Date of birth: 10 November 1984 (age 42)
- Place of birth: Târgovişte, Romania
- Height: 5 ft 11 in (1.80 m)
- Position: Forward

Youth career
- 2000–2004: Rapid București

Senior career*
Years	Team	Apps	(Gls)
2004–2005	FCM Târgovişte	10	(3)
2005–2008	Petrolul Ploieşti	23	(5)
2006–2007	→ Astra Ploieşti (loan)	12	(0)
2007–2008	→ Al Hamriya (loan)	0	(0)
2008–2009	Lincoln City	31	(11)
2009–2011	Leyton Orient	22	(1)
2010	→ Hayes & Yeading United (loan)	8	(3)
2011	Hereford United	6	(0)
2011–2012	Farul Constanţa	27	(15)
2012–2013	CSMS Iași	29	(6)
2013–2014	Vaslui	23	(1)
2014–2015	Academica Argeş	14	(7)
2015–2016	Farul Constanţa	29	(22)
2016–2017	Pafos FC	26	(26)
2017	Alki Oroklini	0	(0)
2017–2018	Farul Constanța	6	(7)
2018–2019	Omonia Aradippou	9	(5)
2020–2021	Flacăra Moreni	5	(3)
Total		280	(115)
- * Club domestic league appearances and goals

Adrian Marian Pătulea (born 10 November 1984) is a Romanian professional footballer who plays as a forward.

He was a member of the Romanian beach soccer team.

== Career ==
=== Early career ===
Pătulea was born in Târgovişte. He played for Rapid Bucharest, Astra Ploieşti and Petrolul Ploieşti in his native Romania. He spent some time in Dubai with Al Hamriya where he linked up with his former Astra coach Petre Gigiu, before moving to the UK.

=== Lincoln City ===
In February 2008 he trained with Burgess Hill Town, but problems with his international clearance curtailed any move. He began the 2008–09 pre-season with Boston United, playing in their 2–0 friendly victory at Shirebrook Town on 12 July 2008. He then arrived at Lincoln City and requested a trial. City manager Peter Jackson's resistance was broken by the player's bizarre training ground routine and Patulea then spent six weeks training with the first team squad. Jackson later commented, "He (Pătulea) was spotted by the groundsman running around the training ground with his girlfriend on his back. The trouble is his girlfriend was naked, which got the attention of the players". During this time, he scored a second-half hat-trick against local rivals Lincoln United and appeared to have won the hearts of Lincoln supporters. It then became apparent that Patulea's former club, Petrolul Ploieşti, held his registration and his switch to Sincil Bank looked to be over when his parent club demanded a large fee from City.

City eventually managed to negotiate a deal for Patulea, and he signed for the club on 29 August 2008. His international clearance documents did not come through in time for him to play in the derby with Grimsby Town, but he scored his first League goal on his debut for Lincoln City, coming off the bench to score a goal in the Imps' 2–0 win over Barnet. Pătulea then went on to make his second appearance from the bench in the Lincoln's away defeat against Bury, before he started his first game of the season away at Brentford, taking just 30 minutes to notch his second goal in a City shirt. Pătulea then scored again in the 57th minute in the 2–0 win over Chester. He yet again found the net in the 30th minute against Chesterfield in Lincoln's 3–1 win over Chesterfield. He then came off the bench to score two goals in Lincoln's 5–1 win at Sincil Bank against Accrington Stanley. He then scored the winner in Lincoln's 1–0 win over Notts County in the 32nd minute.

=== Leyton Orient & Hereford United ===
On 23 June 2009, he signed for Leyton Orient on a two-year deal. He scored his first goal for Orient in a League Cup tie at Colchester United on 11 August 2009. In September 2010, under new Orient manager Russell Slade, Patulea went on loan to Conference National club Hayes & Yeading United. He made his debut for United in the 3–1 defeat at Kidderminster Harriers, scoring their goal but later receiving a red card for violent conduct. When he returned to Orient, he was unable to cement a place in the first team and on 22 January, his contract was terminated by mutual consent. He signed for Hereford United on 7 March in a deal that ran until the end of the season. This contract was not extended after Patulea struggled to make an impact with the Bulls.

=== Farul Constanţa ===
In August 2011 Pătulea returned to his home country to sign with Liga II team Farul Constanţa. He impressed here, scoring 15 goals from 27 games, and attracted attention from bigger clubs.

=== CSMS Iași ===
In August 2012 he joined Liga I club CSMS Iași on a two-year contract. His last game for Farul Constanţa was against Iași, where Pătulea scored two goals in an eventual 4–2 loss.

He scored his first goal for CSMS on 10 August, in a game against Petrolul Ploiești. He tied the score at 2–2 in a dramatic manner, by scoring in the last minute of extra time.

=== Rapid Bucharest and FC Vaslui ===
On 30 July 2013, Adrian Patulea signed with his old club Rapid Bucharest for 1 season, following CSMS Iasi's relegation. However, after TAS's decision to relegate Rapid Bucharest because of financial problems, he terminated his contract with the Bucharest club. He did not play a match for Rapid. On 10 September 2013 he signed with FC Vaslui.
