= Ionuț Balaur =

Romanian footballer (born 1989)

Personal information
- Date of birth: 6 June 1989 (age 37)
- Place of birth: Vaslui, Romania
- Height: 1.88 m (6 ft 2 in)
- Position: Centre back

Team information
- Current team: Unirea Alba Iulia
- Number: 6

Youth career
- 2003–2006: LPS Vaslui

Senior career*
Years	Team	Apps	(Gls)
2007–2014	Vaslui	26	(2)
2007–2008	→ Focșani (loan)	16	(2)
2010	→ Otopeni (loan)	14	(1)
2014–2016	ASA Târgu Mureș	29	(4)
2016–2021	Voluntari	142	(6)
2018	→ Dunărea Călărași (loan)	2	(0)
2021–2023	Mioveni	55	(3)
2023–2024	Argeș Pitești	8	(1)
2024–	Unirea Alba Iulia	0	(0)
- * Club domestic league appearances and goals as of 11 May 2024

Ionuț Balaur (born 6 June 1989) is a Romanian footballer who plays as a centre back for Liga III club Unirea Alba Iulia.

== Club career ==
=== FC Vaslui ===
Balaur was the only player of FC Vaslui that was born in Vaslui. He made a single substitute appearance for the club in the 2006–07 season. In the following seasons he was loaned to different teams like CSM Focșani or CS Otopeni. At the start of the 11/12 season he returned to FC Vaslui. Despite him being a striker, he was used as a central defender after Papp and Cânu's long-term injuries and FC Vaslui's transfers ban. He made some fantastic games in the Europa League and in Liga I as a central defender and was seen as a future important player for the team. However, he suffered an injury in January 2012 that kept him out for 6 months. Following the team dissolving due to financial problems Balaur decided to leave the club.

=== ASA Târgu Mureș ===
In 2014, Balaur signed a two-year contract with the Romanian vice-champions ASA Târgu Mureș being a very constant player for the team reaching Romanian Cup and top standings in the league with his club.

=== FC Voluntari ===
In 2016, Balaur signed a contract with the Bucharest-based club FC Voluntari and becoming an important player for the club becoming the captain of the squad several times during the 2017/18 season.

=== Argeș Pitești ===
In summer 2023, Argeș Pitești announced the signing of Balaur.

== Statistics ==
Statistics accurate as of match played 11 May 2024

Club	Season	League		Cup		Europe		Other		Total	
Club	Season	Apps	Goals	Apps	Goals	Apps	Goals	Apps	Goals	Apps	Goals
Vaslui	2006–07	1	0	—		—		—		1	0
Vaslui	2011–12	9	1	2	0	4	0	—		15	1
Vaslui	2013–14	16	1	2	0	—		—		18	1
Vaslui	Total	26	2	4	0	4	0	—		34	2
Focșani (loan)	2007–08	16	2	0	0	—		—		16	2
Otopeni (loan)	2010–11	14	1	0	0	—		—		14	1
ASA Târgu Mureș	2014–15	9	0	2	0	—		—		11	0
ASA Târgu Mureș	2015–16	20	4	3	0	0	0	1 (Note: Appearance in the Cupa Ligii)	0	24	4
ASA Târgu Mureș	Total	29	4	5	0	0	0	1	0	35	4
Voluntari	2016–17	29	2	3	0	—		1	0	33	2
Voluntari	2017–18	30	1	1	0	—		3 (Note: One appearance in the Supercupa României and two appearances and one goal in promotion-relegation play-offs)	1	34	2
Voluntari	2018–19	31	2	2	0	—		—		33	2
Voluntari	2019–20	20	1	0	0	—		—		20	1
Voluntari	2020–21	32	0	0	0	—		1 (Note: Appearance in promotion-relegation play-offs)	0	33	0
Voluntari	Total	142	6	6	0	—		5	1	153	7
Dunărea Călărași (loan)	2018–19	2	0	—		—		—		2	0
Mioveni	2021–22	30	2	0	0	—		—		30	2
Mioveni	2022–23	25	1	1	0	—		—		26	1
Mioveni	Total	55	3	1	0	—		—		56	3
Argeș Pitești	2023–24	8	1	2	0	—		—		10	1
Career total		292	19	18	0	4	0	6	1	320	20

== Honours ==
FC Vaslui

- Cupa României runner-up: 2009–10

ASA Târgu Mureș

- Supercupa României: 2015

Voluntari

- Cupa României: 2016–17
- Supercupa României: 2017
