= Valter Heil =

Romanian footballer

Personal information
- Date of birth: 11 February 1990 (age 36)
- Place of birth: Satu Mare, Romania
- Height: 1.87 m (6 ft 2 in)
- Position: Centre back

Youth career
- –2009: Olimpia Satu Mare

Senior career*
Years	Team	Apps	(Gls)
2009–2012	Olimpia Satu Mare		
2012–2014	Vaslui	1	(0)
2012	→ Voința Sibiu (loan)	9	(0)
2013–2014	→ ASA Târgu Mureș (loan)	17	(1)
2014–2017	Olimpia Satu Mare	82	(4)
2017–2024	Kazincbarcika	199	(6)
- * Club domestic league appearances and goals as of 12 August 2024

Valter Heil (born 11 February 1990) is a Romanian footballer who plays as a centre back.

He started his career at Olimpia Satu Mare. In 2012, he joined FC Vaslui. He made his Liga I debut on 4 May 2013 in a match against Universitatea Cluj. He was later loaned to ASA Târgu Mureș.

== Honours ==
Olimpia Satu Mare

- Liga IV – Satu Mare County: 2010–11
