= Adrian Neniță =

Romanian footballer

Personal information
- Full name: Adrian Neniță
- Date of birth: 2 November 1996 (age 30)
- Place of birth: Vaslui, Romania
- Height: 1.80 m (5 ft 11 in)
- Position: Attacking midfielder

Team information
- Current team: Stejarul Dobrovăț
- Number: 7

Youth career
- 2010–2013: LPS Vaslui

Senior career*
Years	Team	Apps	(Gls)
2013–2014	Vaslui	5	(0)
2014–2019	Viitorul Constanța	0	(0)
2015–2016	→ Chindia Târgoviște (loan)	30	(2)
2023–2024	CSM Vaslui	24	(1)
2024–	Stejarul Dobrovăț	0	(0)

International career
2012–2014	Romania U16	6	(1)
- * Club domestic league appearances and goals as of 09:54, 22 November 2024 (UTC)

Adrian Neniță (born 2 November 1996) is a Romanian footballer who plays for Liga IV side Stejarul Dobrovăț. He made his Liga I debut against Politehnica Iași on 30 May 2013.

== Honours ==
=== Club ===
Viitorul Constanța

- Liga I: 2016–17
