= Mauricio Cuero =

Colombian footballer (born 1993)

Personal information
- Full name: Mauricio Andrés Cuero Castillo
- Date of birth: 28 January 1993 (age 33)
- Place of birth: Tumaco, Colombia
- Height: 1.78 m (5 ft 10 in)
- Position: Right winger

Team information
- Current team: Chacarita Juniors

Youth career
- La Equidad

Senior career*
Years	Team	Apps	(Gls)
2011–2015	La Equidad	19	(0)
2014	→ Vaslui (loan)	8	(0)
2014	→ Olimpo (loan)	17	(1)
2015	→ Banfield (loan)	32	(7)
2016	Levante	13	(0)
2016–2019	Santos Laguna	17	(2)
2017	→ Tijuana (loan)	1	(0)
2018	→ Olimpia (loan)	14	(2)
2019	→ Belgrano (loan)	10	(0)
2019–2020	→ Atlas (loan)	17	(3)
2020–2022	Banfield	37	(2)
2023	Independiente	11	(0)
2024	Garcilaso	17	(0)
2026	Madryn	8	(1)
2026-	Chacarita	3	(0)

International career
2013	Colombia U20	9	(0)
- * Club domestic league appearances and goals as of 16:51, 27 April 2026 (UTC)

Mauricio Andrés Cuero Castillo (born 28 January 1993) is a Colombian footballer who plays as a winger for Chacarita Juniors.

== Club career ==
Born in Tumaco, Cuero was a La Equidad youth graduate. He made his first team – and Categoría Primera A – debut on 23 October 2011, coming on as a late substitute in a 1–0 away win against Independiente Medellín.

On 29 January 2014 Cuero moved abroad, after agreeing to a three-year contract with Romanian Liga I side FC Vaslui. He made his debut in the category on 23 February, again from the bench in a 0–0 draw at CFR Cluj.

After being rarely used, Cuero was loaned to Club Olimpo on 16 July 2014. He scored his first professional goal on 8 November, scoring his team's second in a 2–1 home win against Quilmes AC.

On 8 January 2015 Cuero moved to Club Atlético Banfield on loan, still owned by La Equidad. He scored seven goals for the side in 29 appearances, as his side finished eighth.

On 10 November 2015, Levante UD reached an agreement with La Equidad for the transfer of Cuero, who is expected to sign a three-year deal with the Valencian side. On 21 July 2016, after suffering relegation, he signed for Santos Laguna.

On 5 June 2017, Club Santos Laguna's president, Alejandro Irarragorri, announced that they had loaned Cuero to Xolos de Tijuana.

In March 2024, Cuero joined Peruvian Primera División club Deportivo Garcilaso.

== Honours ==
Colombia U20

- 2013 South American Youth Championship: 2013
