= Igor Prahić =

Croatian footballer

Personal information
- Date of birth: 15 April 1987 (age 39)
- Place of birth: Varaždin, SFR Yugoslavia
- Height: 1.90 m (6 ft 3 in)
- Position: Centre back

Team information
- Current team: SpG Edelserpentin
- Number: 4

Youth career
- 1997–2005: Varteks

Senior career*
Years	Team	Apps	(Gls)
2006–2010	Varteks	87	(6)
2006	→ Sloboda Varaždin (loan)		
2010–2011	Sedan	2	(0)
2011–2012	Istra 1961	12	(0)
2012–2013	Zadar	45	(1)
2013–2014	Vaslui	15	(0)
2014–2015	Padideh	38	(3)
2015–2016	Zavrč	0	(0)
2016–2017	Naft Tehran	23	(3)
2017–2018	Varaždin	9	(0)
2018–2019	Nafta	20	(4)
2019–2020	Drava Ptuj	6	(0)
2020	Zagorec Krapina	10	(0)
2021-	SpG Edelserpentin	37	(3)

International career
2002	Croatia U15	2	(0)
2002–2003	Croatia U16	9	(1)
2003	Croatia U17	4	(0)
2004	Croatia U18	2	(0)
2004–2006	Croatia U19	13	(1)
2006–2007	Croatia U20	3	(0)
2007–2008	Croatia U21	7	(0)
- * Club domestic league appearances and goals as of 26 November 2022

Igor Prahić (born 15 April 1987) is a Croatian professional footballer who plays as a centre back for SpG Edelserpentin.

== Career ==
In December 2008, Prahić was invited on a trial at Celtic, with media speculations saying he might sign for the Scottish side during the 2008–09 winter transfer window.

Prahić rose through all youth levels playing for Varteks before debuting in top-flight football in 2006. He also has 40 caps for Croatia's youth teams. On 16 December 2010 CS Sedan signed Croatian centre-back from Varaždin (Varteks' new name, as of June 2010) until June 2012.

On 2 September 2013, Prahić agreed a deal to play for the Romanian team Vaslui for three years, being signed as a replacement for Fernando Varela, who is expected to sign with Steaua.

=== Iran ===
On 29 July 2014, Prahić signed with newly promoted Persian Gulf Pro League side Padideh. Prahic left Padideh in January 2016 and announced he was retiring from football. However, Prahic signed with Naft Tehran on 17 July 2016.
