= Octavian Ormenișan =

Romanian footballer

Octavian Ormenişan
Personal information
- Full name: Octavian Dorin Ormenişan
- Date of birth: 31 August 1992 (age 34)
- Place of birth: Târgu Mureș, Romania
- Height: 1.90 m (6 ft 3 in)
- Position: Goalkeeper

Youth career
- 2004–2010: Tg. Mureş
- 2010–2011: Sportul Studențesc București

Senior career*
Years	Team	Apps	(Gls)
2011–2013	Sportul Studențesc București	15	(0)
2013–2014	FC Vaslui	2	(0)
2014–2015	Săgeata Năvodari	0	(0)
2015–2016	Baia Mare	32	(0)
- * Club domestic league appearances and goals as of 26 June 2016

Octavian Dorin Ormenişan (born 31 August 1992, Târgu Mureș) is a Romanian professional footballer who played as a goalkeeper. He appeared in Liga I for Sportul Studențesc București and FC Vaslui.

== Statistics ==
Club	Season	League		Cup		Europe		Other		Total	
Club	Season	Apps	C.S.	Apps	C.S.	Apps	C.S.	Apps	C.S.	Apps	C.S.
Sportul Studențesc	2011–12	5	0	1	0	0	0	0	0	6	0
Sportul Studențesc	2012–13	10	4	3	1	0	0	0	0	13	5
Sportul Studențesc	Total	15	4	4	1	0	0	0	0	19	5
Vaslui	2013–14	2	0	0	0	0	0	0	0	0	0
Vaslui	Total	2	0	0	0	0	0	0	0	0	0
Săgeata Năvodari	2014–15	0	0	0	0	0	0	0	0	0	0
Săgeata Năvodari	Total	0	0	0	0	0	0	0	0	0	0
Baia Mare	2014–15	?	?	?	?	0	0	0	0	0	0
Baia Mare	2015–16	28	13	0	0	0	0	0	0	28	13
Baia Mare	Total	28	13	0	0	0	0	0	0	28	13
Career total		45	17	4	1	0	0	0	0	49	18

Statistics accurate as of match played 6 May 2016
