= Andrei Enescu =

Romanian footballer

Personal information
- Full name: Andrei Ștefan Enescu
- Date of birth: 12 October 1987 (age 39)
- Place of birth: Turnu-Severin, Romania
- Height: 1.80 m (5 ft 11 in)
- Position: Midfielder

Team information
- Current team: Avântul Reghin
- Number: 22

Senior career*
Years	Team	Apps	(Gls)
2001–2004	FC Drobeta	55	(15)
2004–2005	Building Vânju Mare	22	(0)
2005–2006	Steaua II București	0	(0)
2006–2007	Pandurii Târgu Jiu	1	(0)
2007–2008	Sheriff Tiraspol	25	(6)
2008–2010	Gloria Bistrița	20	(0)
2010–2011	Bőcs	13	(4)
2011–2012	Mezőkövesd-Zsóry	9	(0)
2012–2013	Gloria Bistrița	41	(0)
2013–2014	Vaslui	14	(0)
2014	Gaz Metan Mediaș	3	(0)
2015–2016	Politehnica Iași	46	(2)
2016–2017	Ethnikos Achna	45	(2)
2018	Poli Timișoara	11	(1)
2018	UTA Arad	18	(0)
2019–2020	SCM Gloria Buzău	7	(0)
2020–2022	Gloria Bistrița	27	(1)
2022–	Avântul Reghin	62	(1)
- * Club domestic league appearances and goals as of 12:46, 25 December 2024 (UTC)

Andrei Ștefan Enescu (born 12 October 1987) is a Romanian professional footballer who plays as a midfielder for Liga III club Avântul Reghin.

== Honours ==
SCM Gloria Buzău

- Liga III: 2018–19
