= Nuno Viveiros =

Portuguese footballer

Personal information
- Full name: Nuno Filipe Vasconcelos Viveiros
- Date of birth: 22 June 1983 (age 43)
- Place of birth: Machico, Portugal
- Height: 1.69 m (5 ft 7 in)
- Position: Winger

Youth career
- 1995–1999: Santacruzense
- 1999–2002: Nacional

Senior career*
| Years | Team | Apps | (Gls) |
| 2002–2006 | Nacional | 34 | (1) |
| 2002–2003 | → Camacha (loan) | 18 | (1) |
| 2004 | → Camacha (loan) | 20 | (4) |
| 2006 | Skoda Xanthi | 4 | (0) |
| 2007–2008 | Estrela Amadora | 24 | (1) |
| 2008–2010 | Politehnica Iaşi | 45 | (1) |
| 2010–2013 | FC Braşov | 78 | (3) |
| 2013–2014 | Vaslui | 24 | (3) |
| 2014–2015 | Universitatea Cluj | 26 | (4) |
| 2015–2016 | CSMS Iași | 26 | (2) |
| 2016–2017 | União Madeira | 36 | (1) |
| 2017–2018 | Camacha | 26 | (5) |
| 2018–2019 | União Madeira | 15 | (0) |
| Total | | 376 | (26) |

International career
| 2003–2004 | Portugal U20 | 6 | (1) |
| 2004 | Portugal U21 | 1 | (0) |

Managerial career
- 2020–2021: União Madeira (sporting director)
- * Club domestic league appearances and goals

Nuno Filipe Vasconcelos Viveiros (born 22 June 1983) is a Portuguese former professional footballer who played as a winger.

== Club career ==
Born in Machico, Madeira, Viveiros amassed Primeira Liga totals of 58 games and two goals over five seasons, with C.D. Nacional and C.F. Estrela da Amadora. He made his debut in the competition whilst at the service of the former, playing 57 minutes in a 0–2 home loss against U.D. Leiria on 21 September 2003, and scored his first goal with the same club, contributing to a 4–0 away win over FC Porto on 11 March 2005.

In summer 2006, Viveiros signed with Super League Greece side Skoda Xanthi, but returned to his country shortly after to join Estrela. In 2008, he started an adventure in Romania and its Liga I that would last for nearly a decade, his first team being FC Politehnica Iași.

== International career ==
Viveiros participated with the Portuguese under-20 side in the 2003 edition of the Toulon Tournament, scoring in a 2–0 semi-final win against Turkey as the nation went on to win the competition. His first and only cap for the under-21s arrived on 17 August 2004, as he started in a 0–0 friendly draw with Malta.

== Honours ==
Universitatea Cluj

- Cupa României runner-up: 2014–15
