= Gil Bahia =

Brazilian footballer (born 1992)

Personal information
- Full name: Gilmerson dos Santos Mota
- Date of birth: 27 February 1992 (age 34)
- Place of birth: Salvador, Bahia, Brazil
- Height: 1.69 m (5 ft 7 in)
- Position: Right-back

Youth career
- 2007–2010: Cruzeiro

Senior career*
Years	Team	Apps	(Gls)
2010–2011	Cruzeiro	3	(0)
2012	→ Nacional de Patos (loan)	0	(0)
2012	→ Bahia (loan)	3	(0)
2013–2014	→ Olaría (loan)	0	(0)
2014	Vaslui	10	(0)
2015	Universitatea Cluj	0	(0)
2015	Marília	6	(0)
2016	Saba Qom	0	(0)
2017	Juventus	4	(0)
2018	Prudentópolis	7	(0)
2018	Oliveirense	9	(0)
2019–2022	Ben Guerdane	34	(2)
2022–2023	Al-Najaf SC	0	(0)
2023–2024	Porto Vitória	0	(0)

International career
2007–2008	Brazil U15	2	(0)
2009–2010	Brazil U17	3	(0)
2011–2012	Brazil U20	1	(0)
- * Club domestic league appearances and goals as of 4 March 2020

Gilmerson dos Santos Mota (born 27 February 1992), commonly known as Gil Bahia, is a Brazilian professional footballer who plays as a right-back.
