= Jebel Hafeet =

Mountain on the Arabian Peninsula

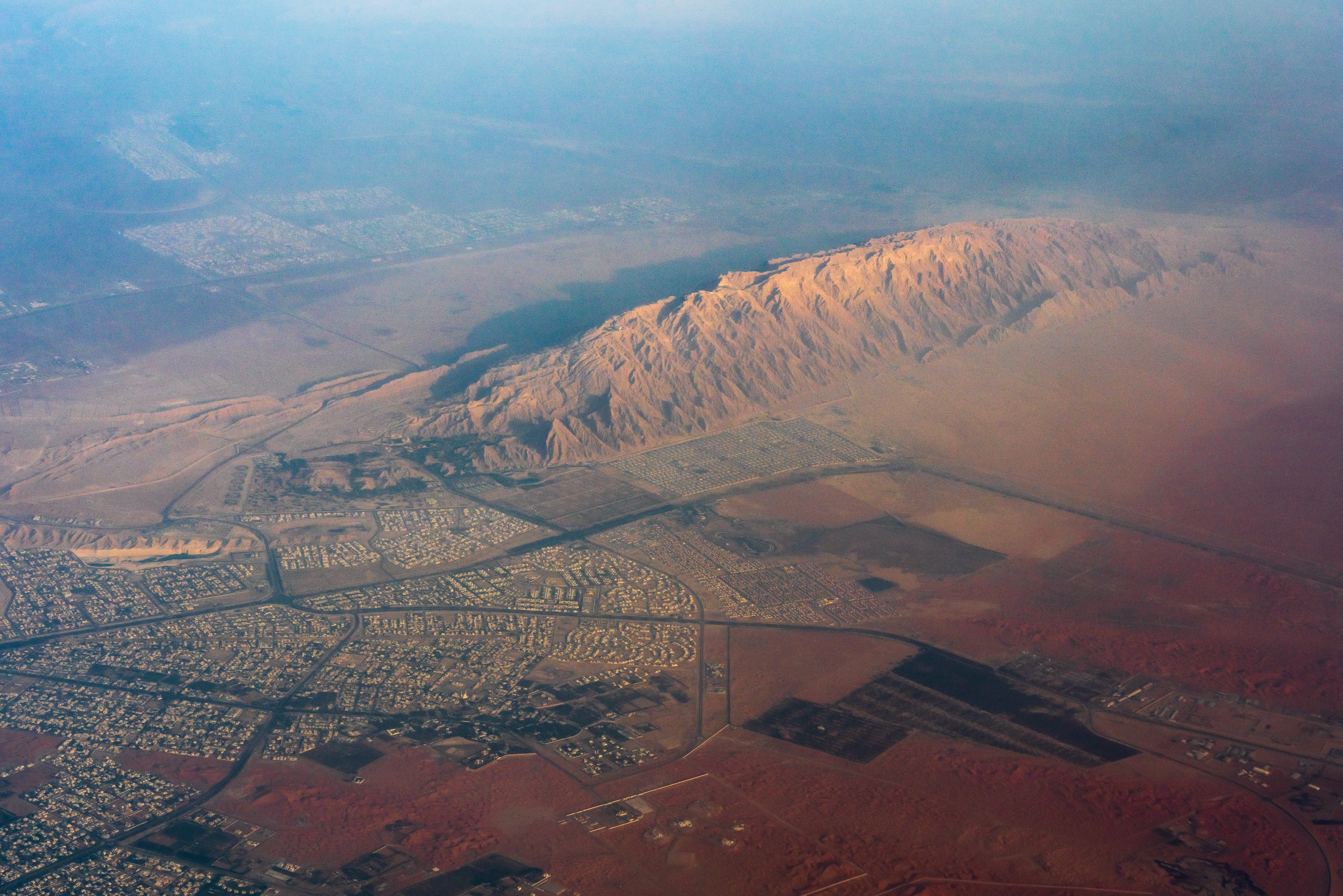
- Aerial view of Jebel Hafeet

Highest point
- Elevation: 1,249 m (4,098 ft)(Disputed)
- Prominence: 900 m (3,000 ft)
- Isolation: 152.72 km (94.90 mi)
- Coordinates: 24°03′31″N 55°46′39″E

Naming
- Native name: جَبَل حَفِيْت (Arabic); Jabal Ḥafīt (Arabic)

Geography
- Location within United Arab Emirates Location within Persian Gulf Location within West and Central Asia
- Countries: Oman; United Arab Emirates
- Parent range: Al-Hajar Mountains (sensu lato)

Jabal Hafeet (Arabic: جَبَل حَفِيْت, romanized: Jabal Ḥafīt, "Mount Hafeet"; variously transcribed Jabel or Jebal and Hafit – literally "empty mountain") is a mountain in the region of Tawam, on the border of the United Arab Emirates and Oman. It is often considered an outlier of the Hajar Mountains in Eastern Arabia due to its proximity to the main range. To the north is the UAE city of Al Ain, in the Eastern Region of the Emirate of Abu Dhabi, and the adjacent Omani town of Al-Buraimi.

The sole mountain in the Emirate of Abu Dhabi, and one of the highest mountains in the country, it has given its name to a period in UAE history, the Hafit Period of the Bronze Age (3200 to 2600 BCE), because of the discovery of a cluster of important beehive tombs at its foothills. As of 2017, the mountain is recognised as being part of a national park, and was incorporated into the Sheikh Zayed Network of Protected Areas in 2018.

== Climate ==
Jebel Hafeet has a hot desert climate (BWh) according to the Köppen climate classification. On average, 77 mm (3.0 in) of rain falls annually. The temperature is relatively cool from October to March, usually remaining below 25 °C (77 °F). The average overall temperature is 27.1 °C (80.8 °F).

Climate data for Jebel Hafeet
Month	Jan	Feb	Mar	Apr	May	Jun	Jul	Aug	Sep	Oct	Nov	Dec	Year
Mean daily maximum °C (°F)	26.1 (79.0)	26.6 (79.9)	29.7 (85.5)	34.6 (94.3)	38.7 (101.7)	40.0 (104.0)	38.0 (100.4)	36.7 (98.1)	36.5 (97.7)	35.1 (95.2)	31.3 (88.3)	27.9 (82.2)	33.4 (92.2)
Daily mean °C (°F)	20.0 (68.0)	20.9 (69.6)	23.8 (74.8)	27.8 (82.0)	31.8 (89.2)	33.3 (91.9)	32.2 (90.0)	31.1 (88.0)	30.1 (86.2)	28.3 (82.9)	24.5 (76.1)	21.9 (71.4)	27.1 (80.8)
Mean daily minimum °C (°F)	13.0 (55.4)	13.0 (55.4)	13.0 (55.4)	21.1 (70.0)	25.0 (77.0)	26.7 (80.1)	26.4 (79.5)	25.5 (77.9)	23.8 (74.8)	21.5 (70.7)	17.8 (64.0)	13.0 (55.4)	20.0 (68.0)
Average rainfall mm (inches)	9 (0.4)	36 (1.4)	11 (0.4)	4 (0.2)	0 (0)	1 (0.0)	0 (0)	2 (0.1)	1 (0.0)	0 (0)	7 (0.3)	6 (0.2)	77 (3)
Source: Climate-Data.org

== Orography and geology ==
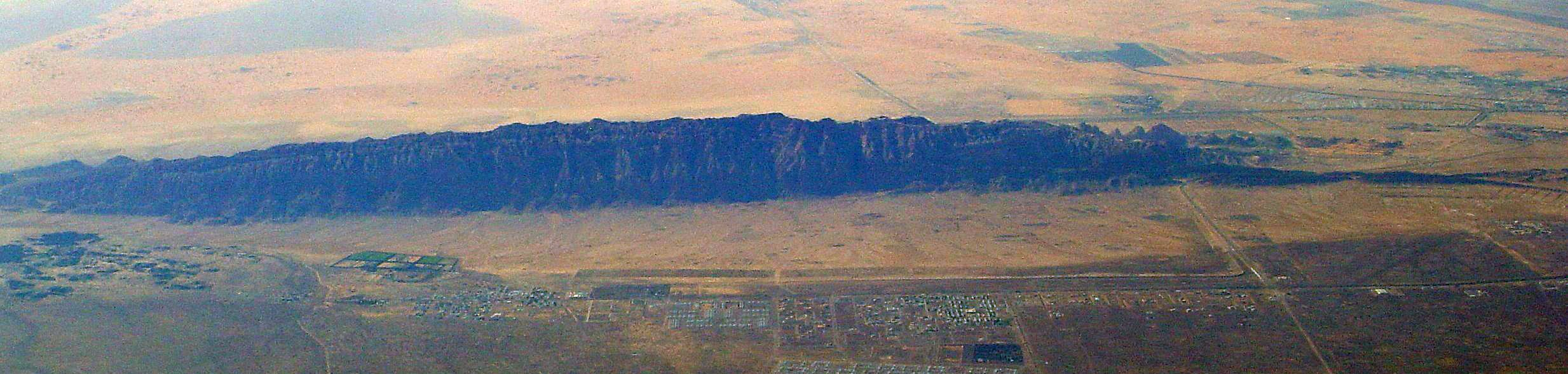
Aerial picture of Jebel Hafeet from the east

=== Geology ===
The Jabal Hafit mountain trends NNW–SSE over about 26 km (16 mi) and is 4–5 km (2.5–3.1 mi) wide. It protrudes 900 m (3,000 ft) above the surrounding plains. The mountain consists of shallow marine sedimentary rocks, which includes limestone, marl, and evaporites. These layers contain many fossils which includes corals, foraminifera, and bryozoa. Fossils indicate that the sedimentary rocks exposed at the surface range from early Eocene to early Miocene in age, younging from the mountains core to its flanks. This structure is an anticline, or more specifically an east-verging pericline. The west limb has a dip of around 30° and the east limb has overturned bedding at 70° in the central area. This results in an inclined axial plane, creating an asymmetric fold. This is unexpected because the structure is folding towards the Hajar Mountains in the east. If the structure is related to the formation of the Hajar range, the anticline would typically be west verging. This indicates that the Jabal Hafit anticline formed due to a backthrust (antithetic fault), and is a fault-propagation fold.

Within the eroded core of the anticline, at the Green Mubazzarah Park, are hot springs with temperatures of around 40 °C (104 °F). There is no volcanic activity in the area, therefore the water is being heated geothermally. Meteoric water is percolating from the surface to about 2 km (1.2 mi) depth and then returning to the surface. This provides evidence for faults below the anticline, as faulting fractures the rock and provides fluid pathways.

The limestone layers were deposited laterally within a basin, and then horizontal shortening folded the layers into an anticline. The timing of when this folding occurred is debated, and the driving force is not fully understood. Some geologists relate the deformation of the Jabal Hafit anticline to the early Miocene Zagros Collision, which is currently active and is caused by the Arabian Plate colliding with the Eurasian Plate. However, the Jabal Hafit Anticline is not actively deforming, and undeformed Miocene sedimentary rocks around the anticline indicate that no deformation has occurred recently. Sedimentary evidence indicates that the Hafit structure developed during the late Oligocene to early–middle Miocene.

=== Caves ===
The mountain rises 1,100–1,400 m (3,600–4,600 ft), and offers a view over Al-Ain. Jebel Hafeet was a well-known landmark throughout the area's history, and is a contemporary tourist attraction. An extensive natural cave system winds through Jabal Hafeet. Jebel Hafeet is crossed by a system of caves, some of which have been explored to a depth of no more than 150 m (490 ft). In the caves there are well-preserved stalagmites and stalactites. Access to the caves is partly natural, while in other parts of the city of Al Ain, the entrance is blocked. At the foot of Jebel Hafeet lies a tourist attraction with hot springs and a lake. To the northeast is the mountain's largest wadi, Wadi Tarabat.

=== Ridges ===
The mountain has ridges which stretch northwards to the inner part of Al-Ain City, two of which have been named and given prominence in literature. One is Al Naqfa Ridge or the Nagfa Ridge (Arabic: جَبَل ٱلنَّقْفَة, romanized: Jabal An-Naqfah), which stretches to Al Ain Oasis in the north, and has a historical fort of the same name nearby. The other is the "Western Ridge" or "West Ridge".

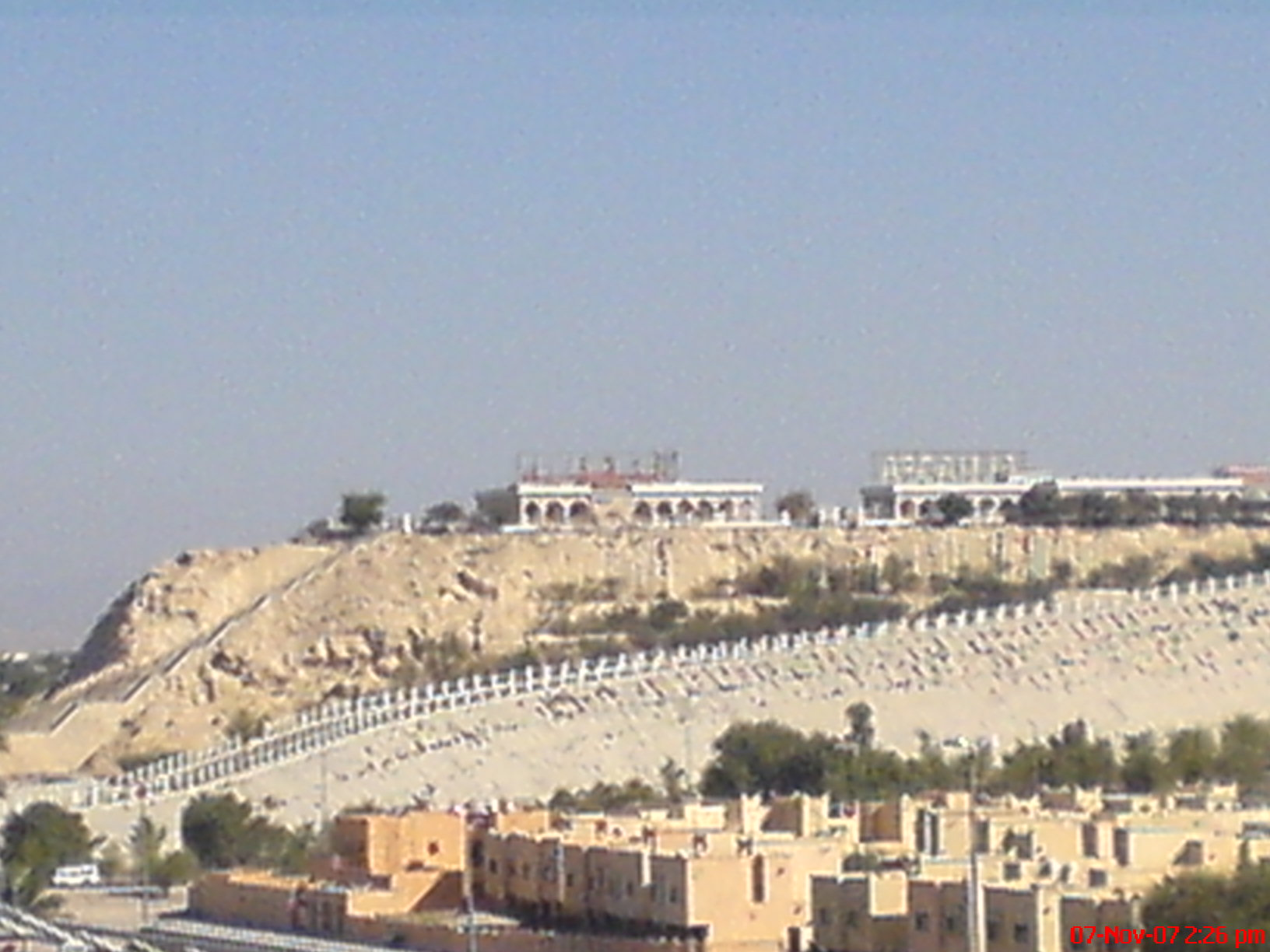
View of the Naqfa Ridge from Al-Ain, 2007

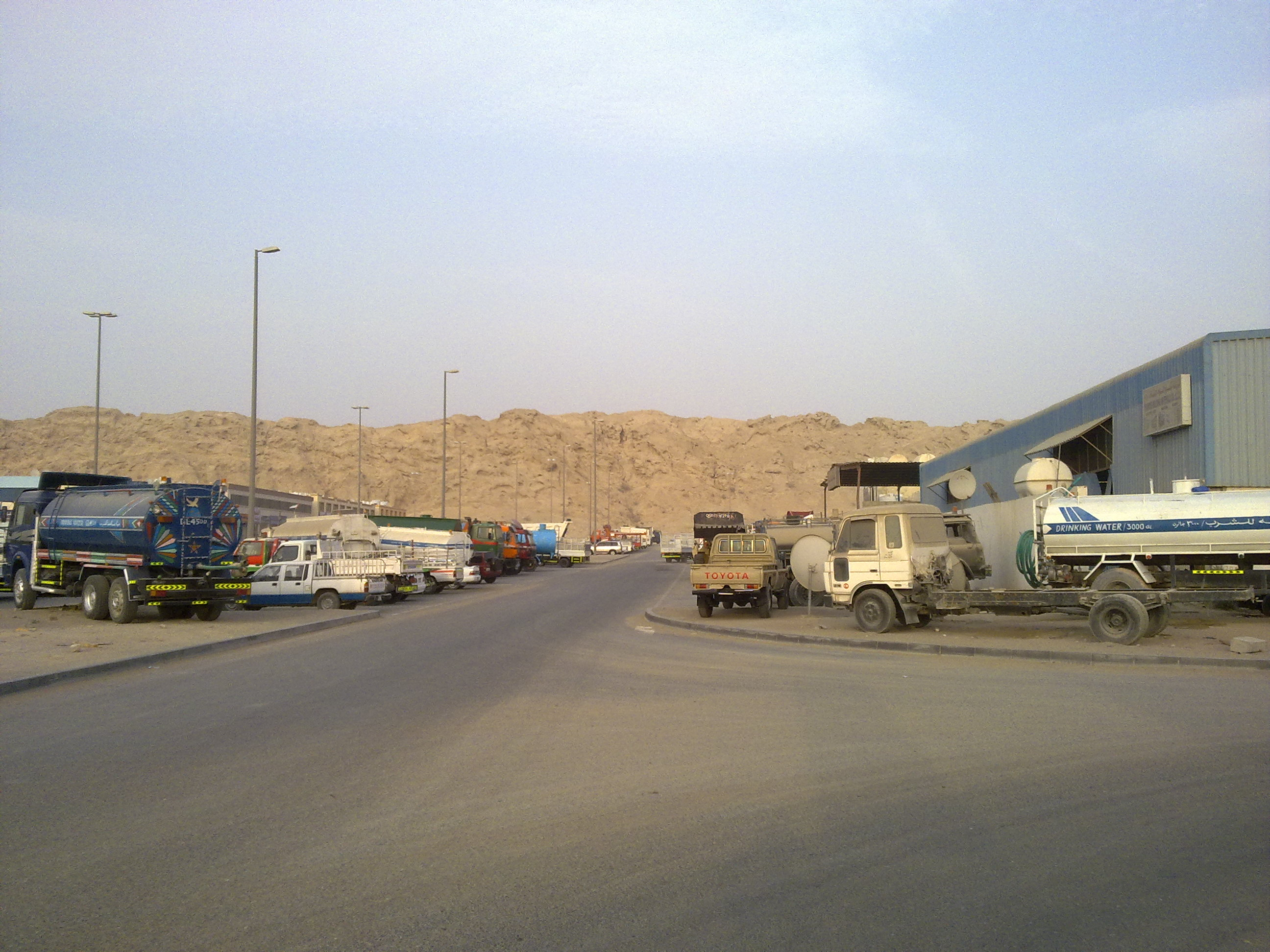
View of the ridge from the industrial zone of Al-Ain, 2012

== Hafeet Mountain Road ==
The Jebel Hafeet Mountain Road, built in 1980, extends for 11.7 km (7.3 mi) up the mountain, rising 1,200 m (3,900 ft). With 60 turns and three lanes (two climbing and one descending), the road was called the greatest driving road in the world by Edmunds.com. The road scales the mountain and ends at a parking lot with a hotel and a palace belonging to the country's rulers. The road was built by Strabag International of Cologne, Germany.

Hafeet Mountain Road is a challenge for cyclists who frequently use the route to train. The Jabal Hafeet Mercure Challenge is an annual road cycling competition taking place in January. National and international riders take part in climbing the 8% average ascent of the mountain. In 2015 it hosted the arrival of the third stage of first edition of Abu Dhabi Tour, won by Colombian Esteban Chaves. Since 2019, the road to the top of Jebel Hafeet is a fixed location of the UAE Tour. For the 2020 edition the mountain was visited twice. The first ascent was won by eventual Tour winner Adam Yates, and during stage 5, which wound up being the final stage of the race due to concerns about the coronavirus, Team UAE's promising young rider Tadej Pogačar won the stage.

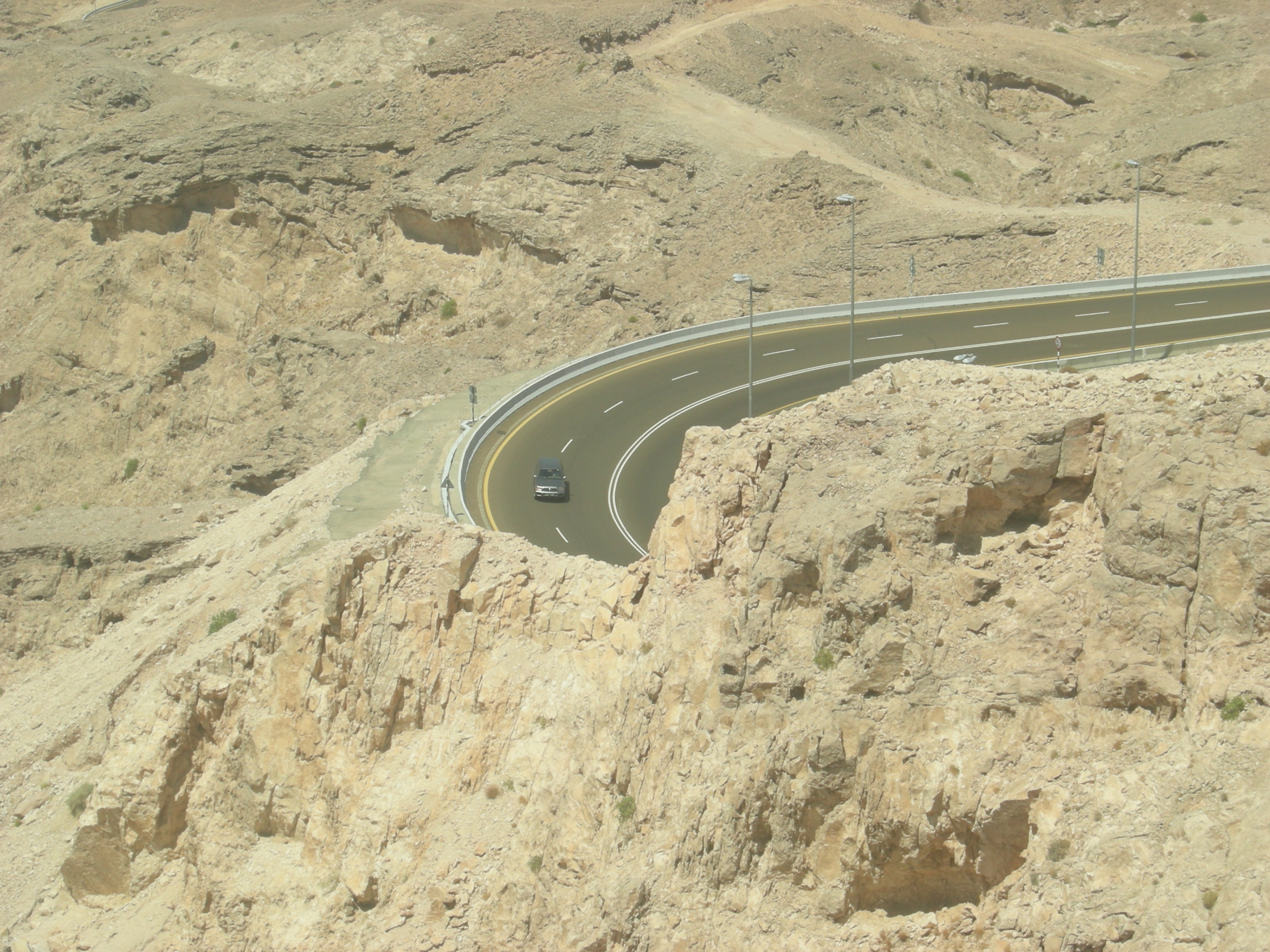
Road leading to the mountain

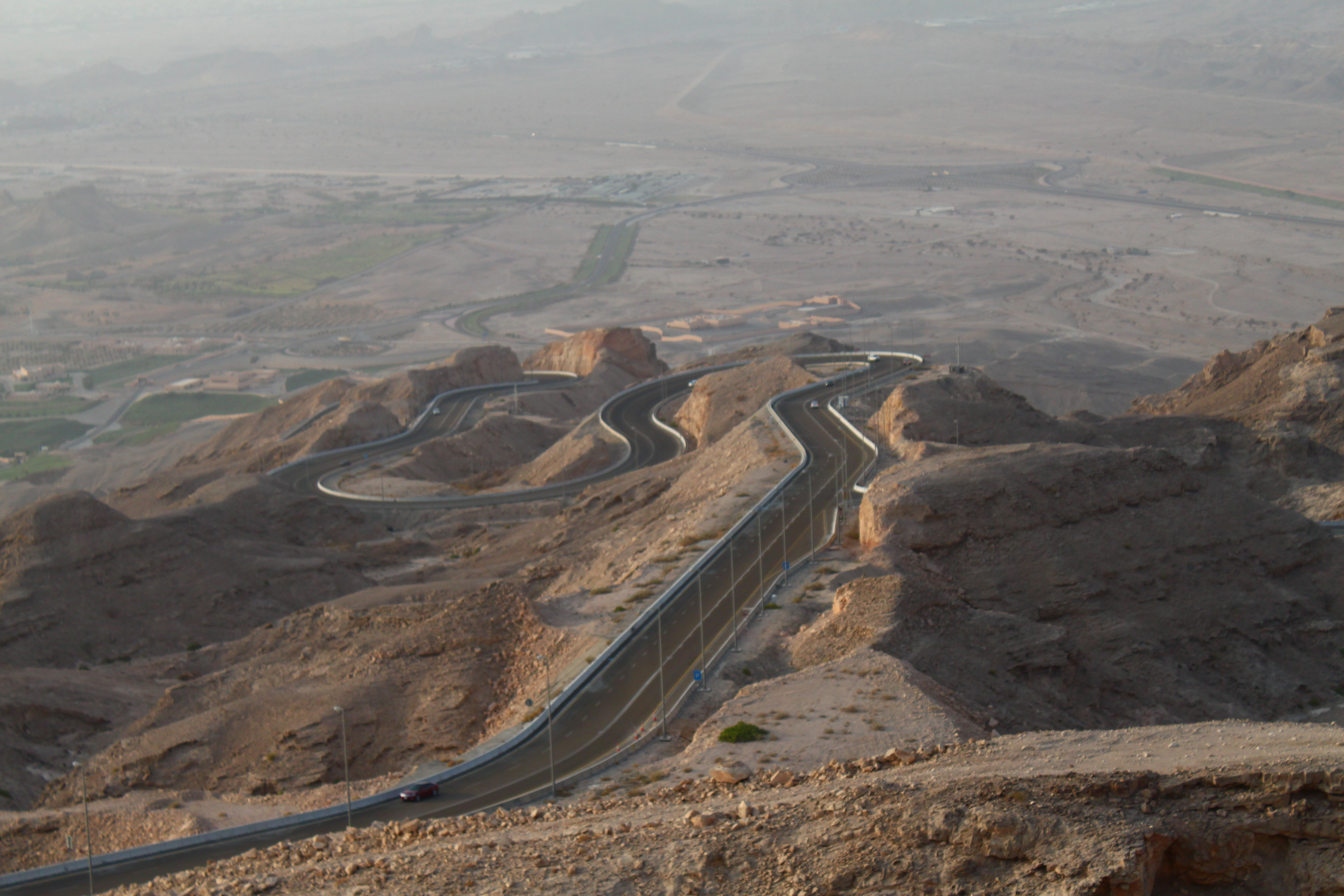
Another road leading to the mountain

== Desert / National Park ==
Cultural Sites of Al Ain
UNESCO World Heritage Site
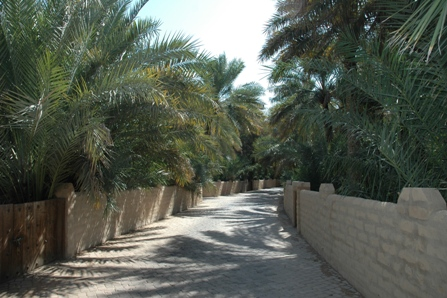
- An alley at the Al Ain Oasis
- Interactive map of Cultural Sites of Al Ain
- Official name: Cultural Sites of Al Ain (Hafit, Hili, Bidaa Bint Saud and Oases Areas)
- Location: Al Ain, United Arab Emirates
- Criteria: Cultural: (iii)(iv)(v)
- Reference: 1343
- Inscription: 2011 (35th Session)
- Area: 4,945.45 ha (12,220.5 acres)
- Buffer zone: 7,605.46 ha (18,793.5 acres)

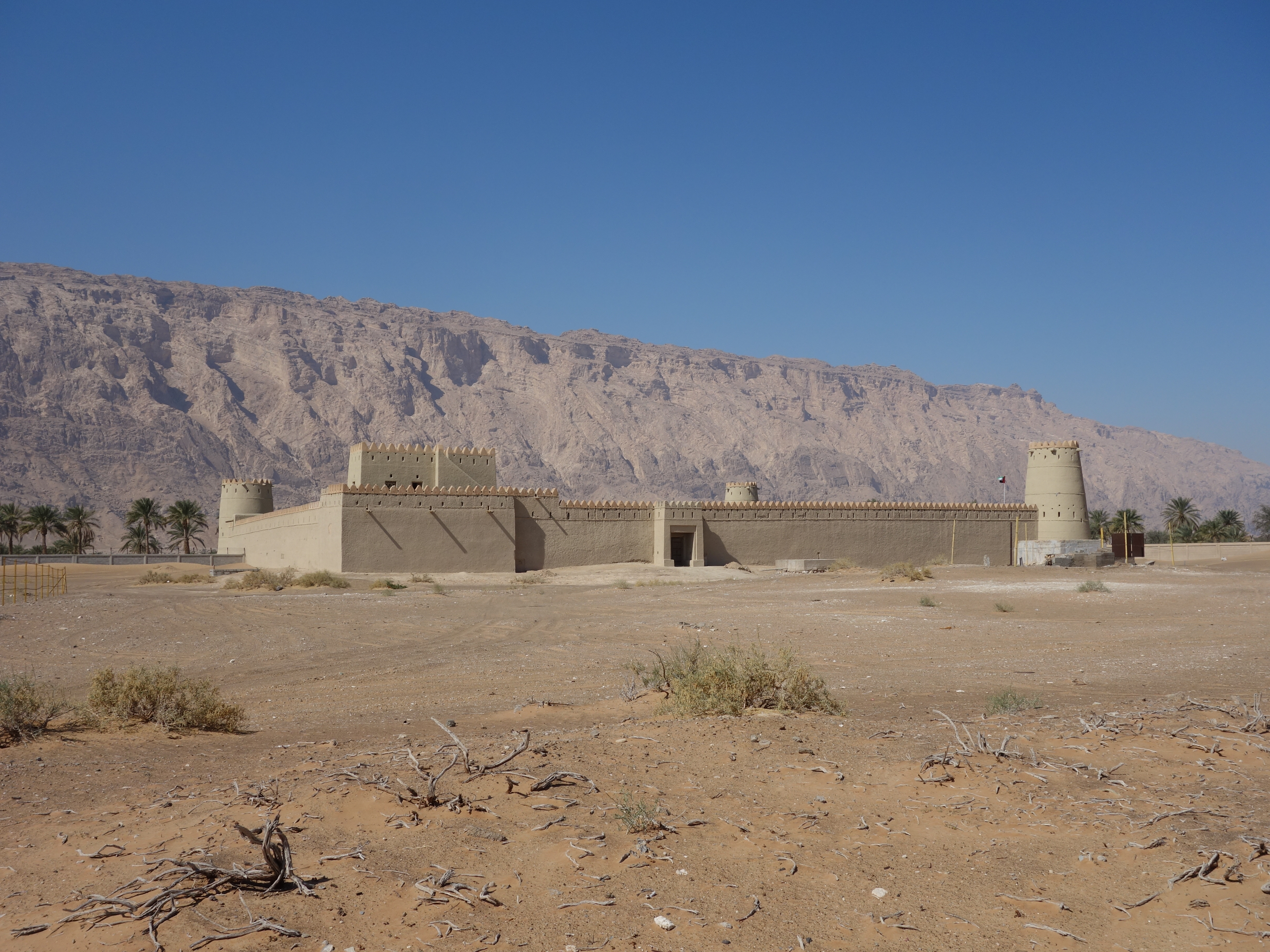
Mezyad Fort with the mountain in the background

The mountain is part of a national or desert park, which can be called "Jebel Hafeet National Park", "Jebel Hafit Desert Park" or "Mezyad Desert Park". It includes the Hafit Graves, Mezyad Fort, and related oases. Its aim was to preserve and restore the fauna, flora, natural environment, and geology of the place, but at the same time, to attract tourists so that they can learn about the area.

=== Flora and fauna ===
Adesmia cothurnata at Wadi Tarabat

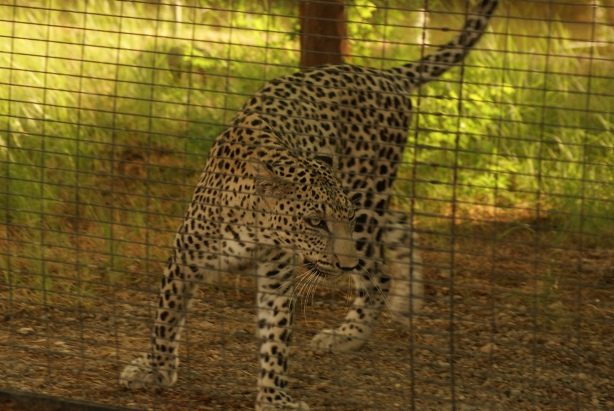
A captive Arabian leopard at a nearby zoo. Wild leopards had been seen in this area in the 20th century.

The mountain is home to endangered species of flora and fauna, particularly at Wadi Tarabat. 170 plant species have been documented from Jebel Hafeet and this accounts for over 40 per cent of the total plant species recorded in the emirate.

On the mountain has been observed the yellow bloom of Acridocarpus orientalis. Numerous other plants have been seen around caves in the mountain. The mountain’s largest wadi, Wadi Tarabat, is alone home to around 95 species of plants, including Christ’s thorn, Ziziphus spina-christi, which was historically used for building, food and herbal medicine.

The caves of Jebel Hafeet are a natural habitat for a wide range of animals, including bats, foxes, snakes, rodents, and hyraxes. The lizard Acanthodactylus opheodurus, which until 1982 was considered extinct in the UAE, has been observed in the area. Among the birds, there is the greatest biodiversity of the whole country: a study counted 119 species of birds. Finally, they have been cataloged, with about 200 different insects, and 23 species of butterflies. Recently, seven species of lacewing insects were discovered here. They were previously thought not to have been in this country, but in Saudi Arabia. The Arabian tahr is also found here.

In 1949, an Arabian leopard was spotted here by Wilfred Thesiger. In 1976, one was shot and wounded, as reported by Hellyer, who claimed another sighting in 1993. The leopard is now possibly extinct in the country's wilderness. In addition, rock hyrax were recently introduced here, and could serve as prey for the leopard, if the latter had to be re-introduced.

In February 2019, the Environment Agency Abu Dhabi recorded the sighting of an Arabian caracal by camera trap in Jebel Hafeet National Park, the first such sighting in the Emirate of Abu Dhabi since 1984. In March, a Blanford's fox was observed using the same technique, after an absence of about 17 years.

=== Archeological findings ===
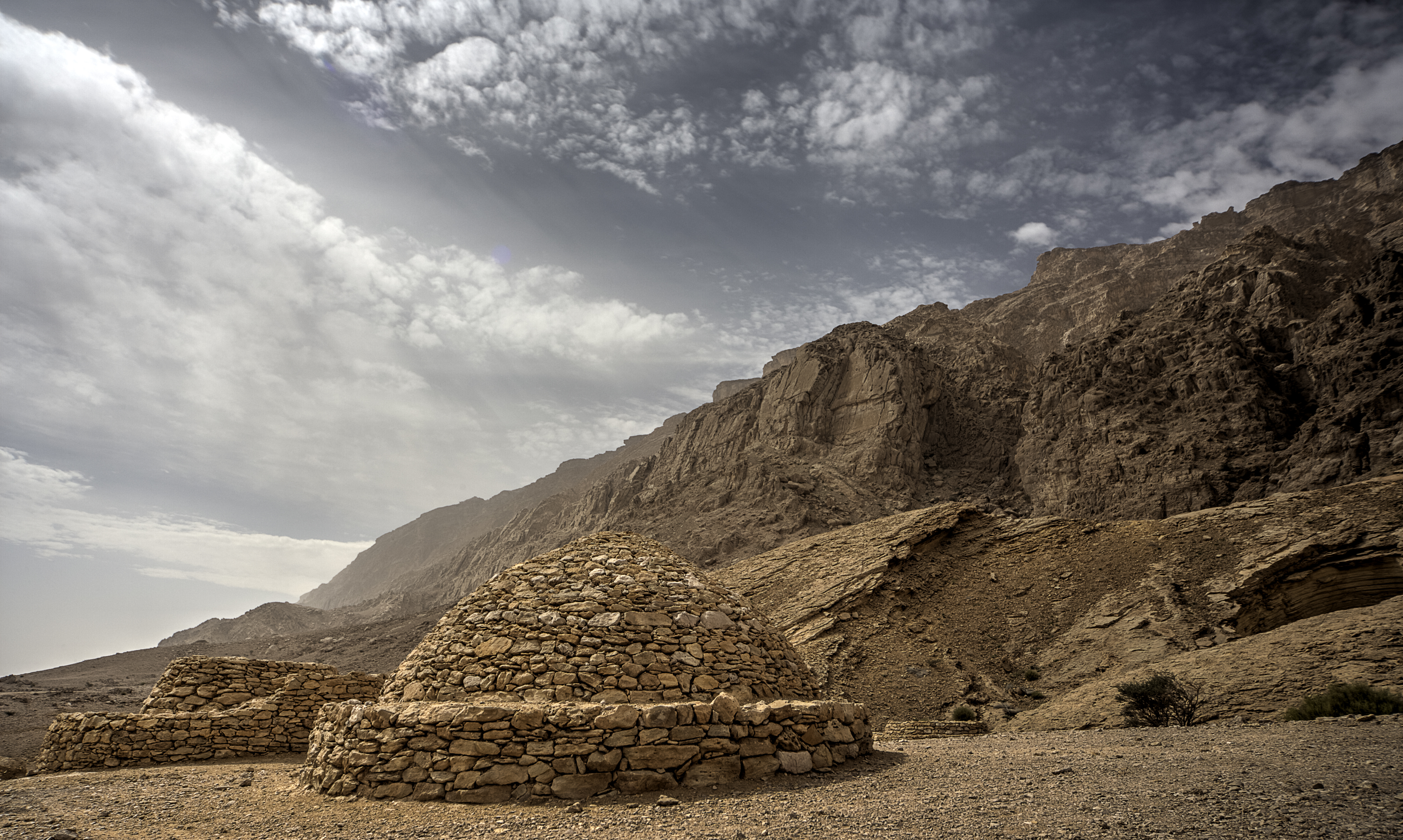
The mountain with prehistoric beehive tombs at its eastern base, dating to the Hafit period, approximately 5,000 years ago

At the foothills of the mountain, near Mezyad, 500 beehive tombs were excavated that dated to an area named after the mountain, the Hafit period of the early Bronze Age, between 3200 and 2600 BC. These tombs were firstly discovered in 1950. Later excavations by Danish archaeologists in 1959 found evidence for ceramic vessels and copper artifacts in these tombs. While the graves on the north side have been partially destroyed by construction projects, the southern tombs are preserved. Some of the tombs contain skeletons, some of which are adorned with bronze objects and pearls. Other objects found in the tombs include ceramics from Mesopotamia, and other artifacts from ancient Iran and the Indus Valley of present-day India and Pakistan, to trading relationships in antiquity. Because of its exceptional archaeological and historical value, in 1993, the "Desert Park and the tombs" (which includes the Jebel Hafeet) was inscribed on the list of UNESCO World Heritage Sites as the "Cultural Sites of Al Ain: Hafit, Hili, Bidaa Bint Saud and Oases Areas". Also nearby is the historic Mezyad Fort.

=== Tourism ===
Jebel Hafeet is a popular tourist center with a broad view over the whole area from the summit. The touristic attraction at the foot of the mountain is Green Mubazzarah (Arabic: ٱلْمُبَزَّرَة ٱلْخَضْرَاء, romanized: Al-Mubazzarah Al-Khaḍrāʿ), a well-developed tourist attraction featuring a geyser, a children's play park and a number of chalets for hire, several hot-water springs gushing forth in little streams and forming a lake, and swimming pools and Jacuzzis scattered all over the area.

There is also a small dam, constructed in 1955 and restored in 2005, one of the earliest development projects instituted by the late Sheikh Zayed bin Sultan Al Nahyan, who was the governor of Al-Ain before becoming the Ruler of Abu Dhabi and President of the UAE. The Mubazzara Dam is freely accessible to the public.

On top of the mountain, there is a military communications outpost and a hotel operated by French hospitality company Mercure, as well as a palace.

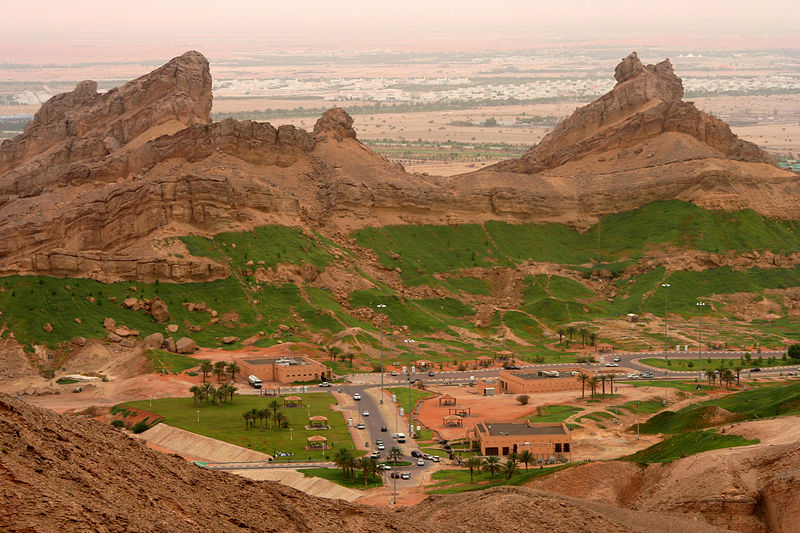
Green Mubazzarah, as viewed from the mountain

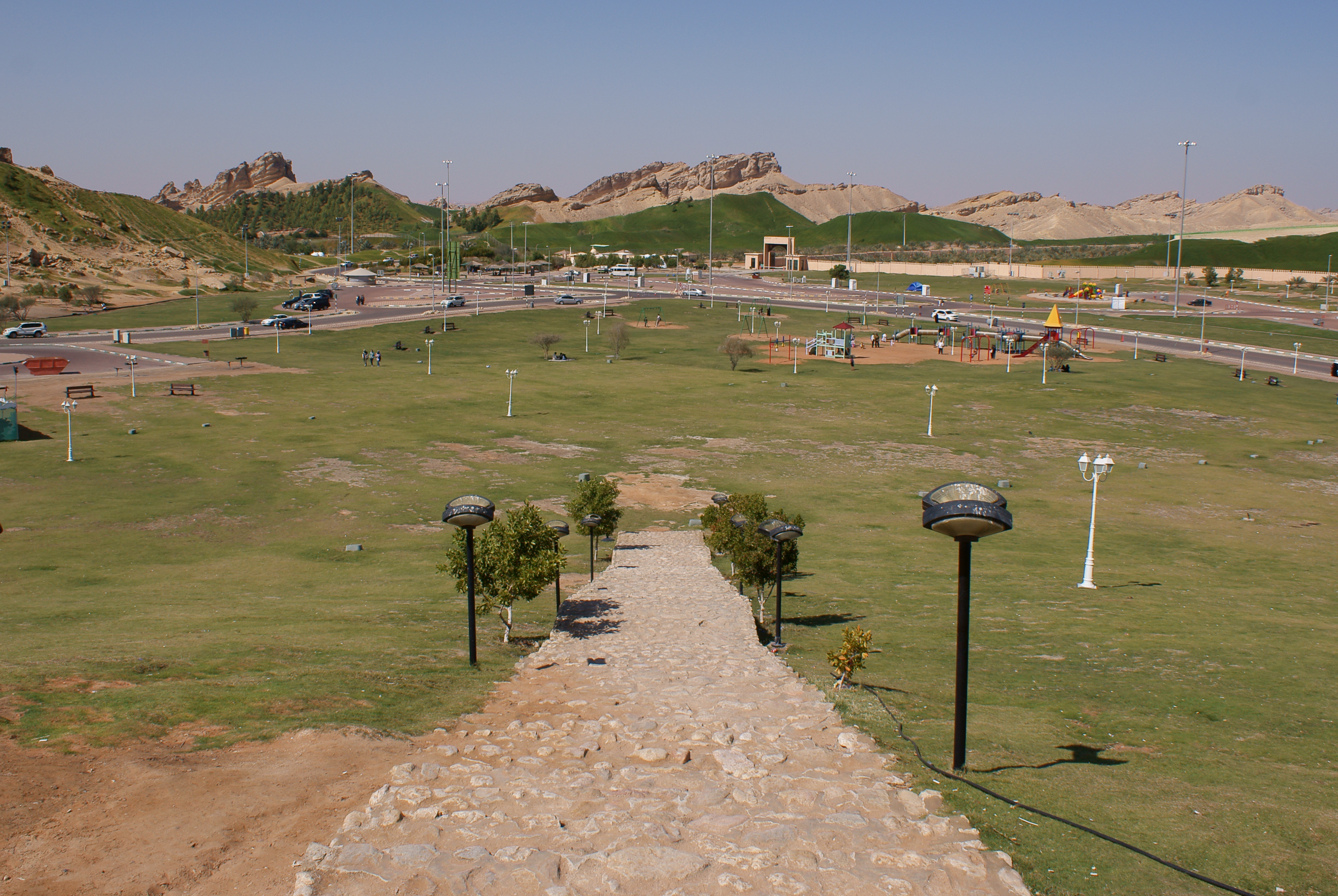

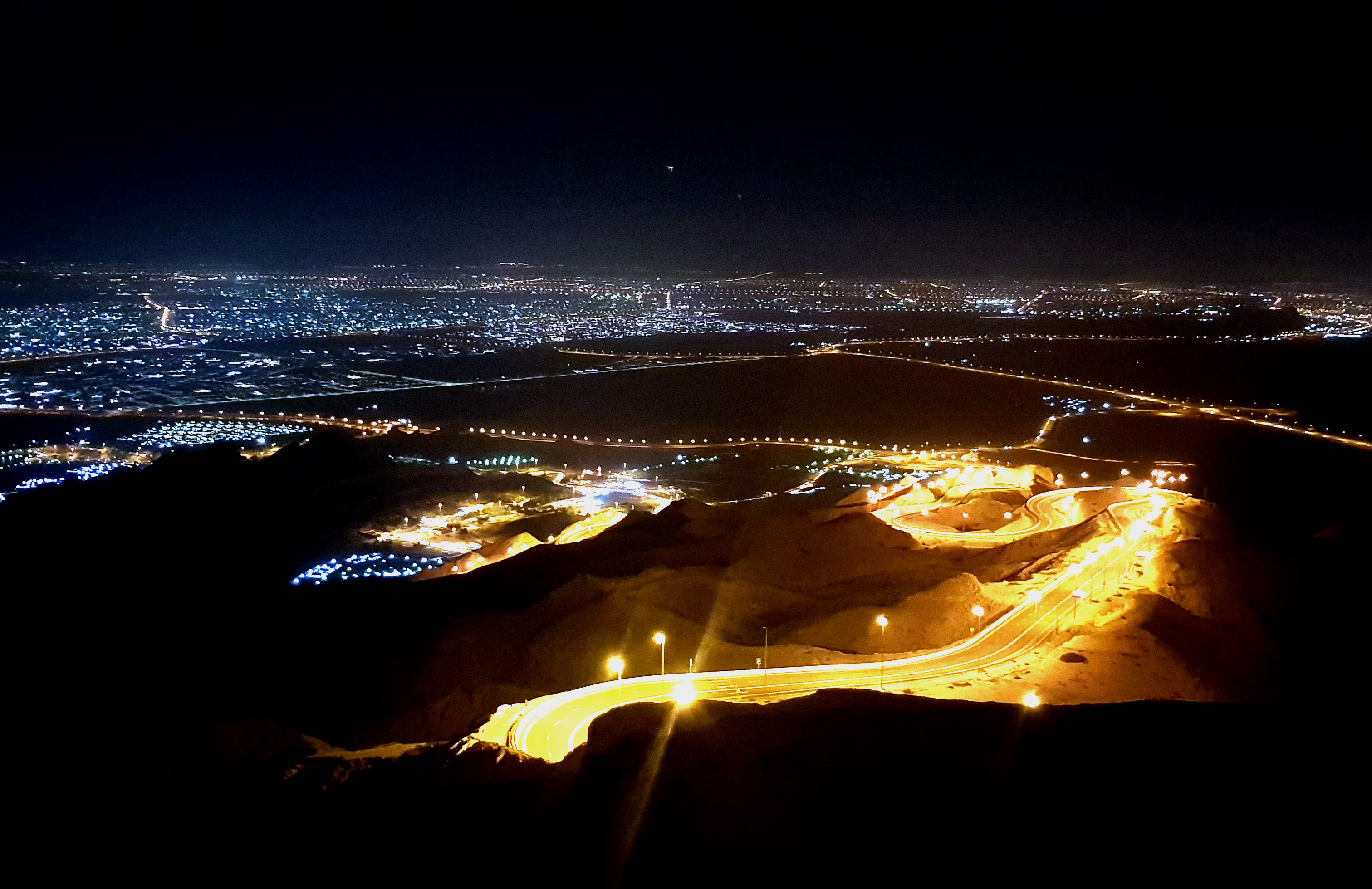

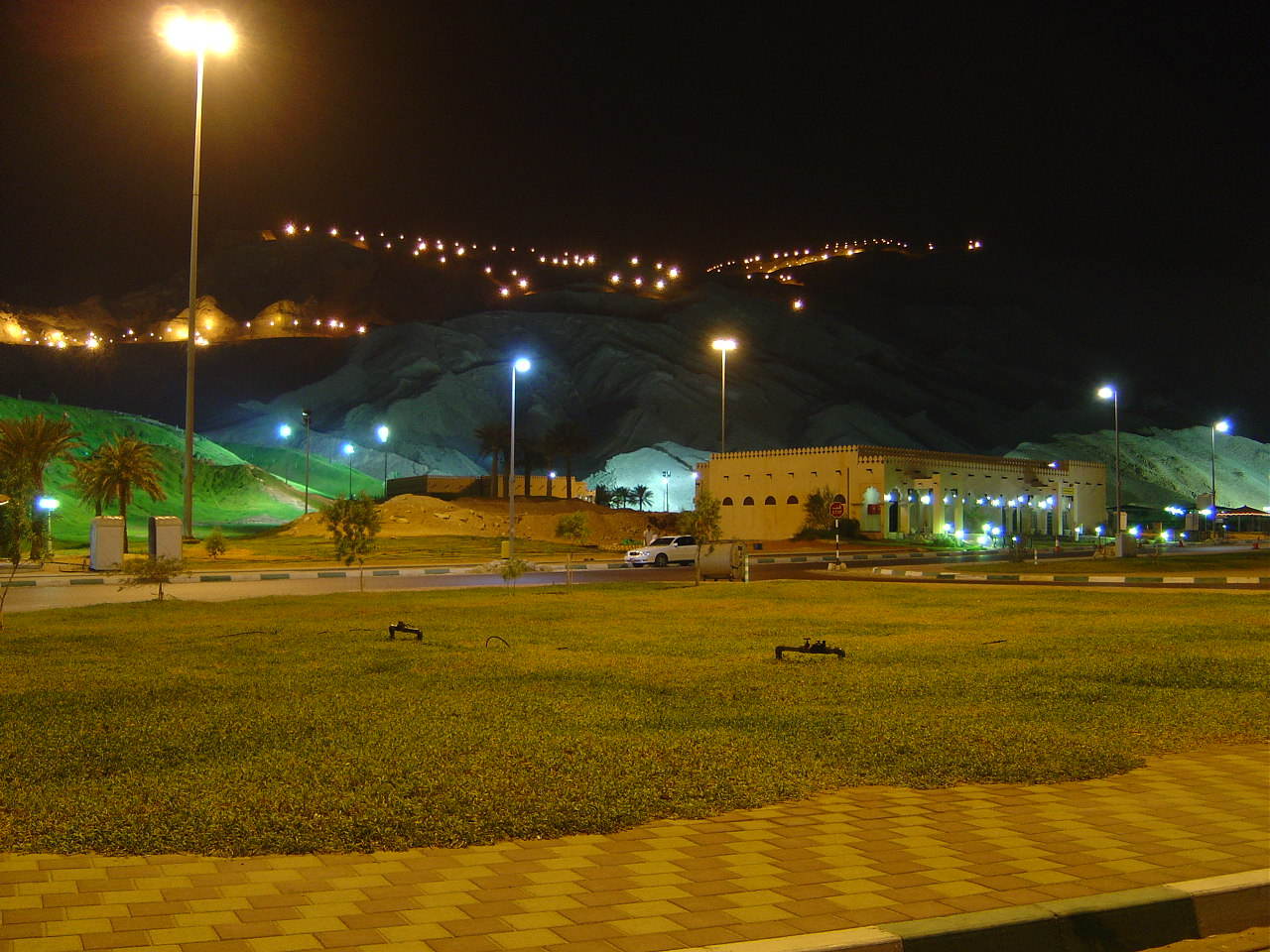
The area of the mountain at night

== See also ==
- Al Marmoom Desert Conservation Reserve, Dubai
- Al-Wathba Wetland Reserve, Abu Dhabi
- Al Buraimi Governorate, Oman
- Archaeological Sites of Bat, Al-Khutm and Al-Ayn, Oman
- Dubai Desert Conservation Reserve
- Ibri, Oman
- Mangrove National Park, Abu Dhabi
- Qattara Oasis
- Ras Al Khor, Dubai
- Rumailah, UAE
- Sharjah National Park
- Sir Abu Nu'ayr, Sharjah
- Sir Bani Yas, Abu Dhabi
- Umm al-Nar culture
- Wadi Wurayah, Fujairah
- List of mountains in Oman
- List of wadis of Oman
- List of mountains in the United Arab Emirates
- List of wadis of the United Arab Emirates
