= El Barraco =

- Municipality
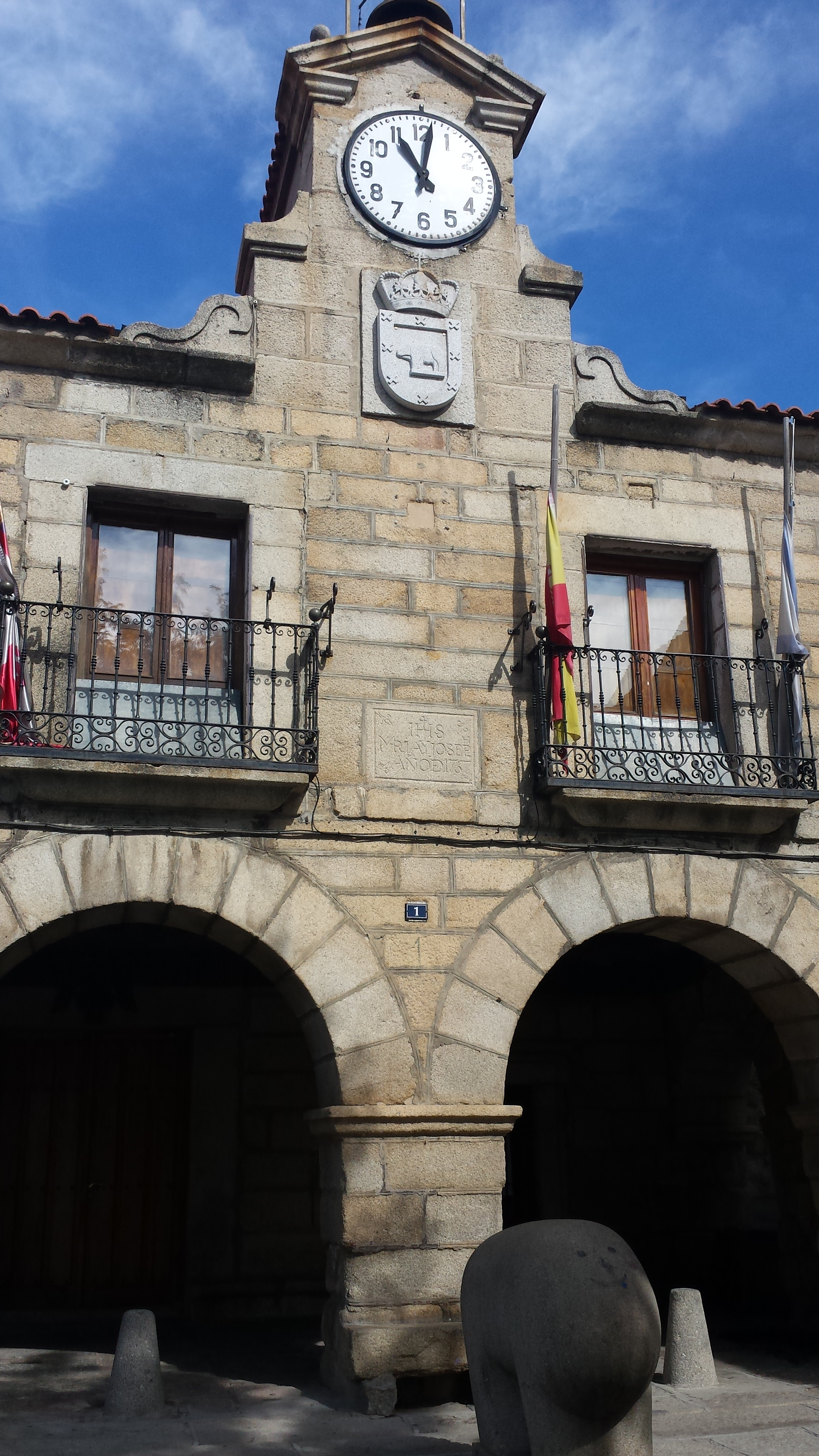
- El Barraco

- Flag Coat of arms

- Location in Spain. El Barraco (Spain)
- Coordinates: 40°28′31″N 4°38′31″W
- Country: Spain
- Autonomous community: Castile and León
- Province: Ávila
- Comarca: Valle del Alberche

Government
  - Mayor: Jose Maria Manso

Area
  - Total: 153.9 km^{2} (59.4 sq mi)
- Elevation: 1,007 m (3,304 ft)

Population (2025-01-01)
  - Total: 2,086
  - Density: 13.55/km^{2} (35.11/sq mi)
- Time zone: UTC+1 (CET)
  - Summer (DST): UTC+2 (CEST)
- Website: Official website

El Barraco is a municipality in the province of Ávila, Castile and León, Spain. It is located in the local valley of the Alberche river.

== Population ==
Historical population
Year	Pop.	±% p.a.
2023	2,005	—
2024	2,027	+1.10%
2025	2,086	+2.91%
Source: INE
