= Leonard Manole =

Romanian footballer

Personal information
- Full name: Leonard Andrei Manole
- Date of birth: 19 April 1993 (age 33)
- Place of birth: Ștefănești, Romania
- Height: 1.80 m (5 ft 11 in)
- Position: Midfielder

Youth career
- Argeş Piteşti

Senior career*
| Years | Team | Apps | (Gls) |
| 2010–2013 | Argeş Piteşti | 52 | (2) |
| 2013–2014 | Vaslui | 3 | (0) |
| 2014–2016 | Metalul Reșița | 39 | (1) |
| 2016 | Farul Constanța | 4 | (0) |
| 2016–2017 | SCM Pitești | 1 | (0) |
| 2017 | Șirineasa | 8 | (4) |
| 2018 | CSMȘ Reșița | | |
| 2019–2020 | Alexandria | 9 | (1) |
| 2021 | Unirea Bascov | 8 | (2) |
| 2021–2023 | Sporting Roșiori | 33 | (7) |

International career^{‡}
| 2011–2012 | Romania U-19 | 3 | (1) |
| 2013–2015 | Romania U-21 | 4 | (1) |
- * Club domestic league appearances and goals as of 17:23, 17 January 2024 (UTC) ‡ National team caps and goals as of 7 June 2013

Leonard Andrei Manole (born 19 April 1993) is a Romanian footballer. He made his Liga I debut on 16 September 2013 for Vaslui, in a match against Poli Timişoara.

== Club career ==
=== Argeş Piteşti ===
Manole began his professional career with his home club Argeş Piteşti. He made his debut for Argeş Piteşti on 9 October 2010 as a second-half substitute for Ionuţ Murineanu against Arieşul Turda.

=== Vaslui ===
Although he was supposed to sign a four–year contract with Astra Giurgiu following Argeş Piteşti's disaffiliation, he ended up signing with Vaslui. He made his debut in a 1–0 home victory against Poli Timişoara, coming in as a substitute for Vaslui captain Lucian Sânmărtean. He was handed the number 10 jersey, left vacant following the departure of Nicolae Stanciu.

== International career ==
While involved with the Romania national under-19 football team, Manole photographed himself with controversial Serbian figure Ratko Butorović. As a result, he was banned from representing Romania for six months.

== Statistics ==
| Club | Season | League | | Cup | | Europe | | Total | |
| Club | Season | Apps | Goals | Apps | Goals | Apps | Goals | Apps | Goals |
|---|---|---|---|---|---|---|---|---|---|
| Argeş Piteşti | 2010–11 | 3 | 0 | 0 | 0 | – | | 3 | 0 |
| Argeş Piteşti | 2011–12 | 21 | 1 | 2 | 0 | – | | 23 | 1 |
| Argeş Piteşti | 2012–13 | 18 | 1 | 1 | 0 | – | | 19 | 1 |
| Total | | 42 | 2 | 3 | 0 | 0 | 0 | 45 | 2 |
| Vaslui | 2013–14 | 2 | 0 | 1 | 0 | – | | 3 | 0 |
| Total | | 2 | 0 | 1 | 0 | 0 | 0 | 3 | 0 |
| Career Total | | 44 | 2 | 4 | 0 | 0 | 0 | 48 | 2 |

Statistics accurate as of match played 24 September 2013
