= Octavianus (poet) =

Octavianus or Octavian was a Latin poet of the 6th century AD, to whom several poems are attributed in the Latin Anthology. Emil Baehrens (Poetae Latini Minores) conjectured that Octavianus had been the first editor of the Anthology, based on the fact that his name and other life details, such as his Carthaginian blood and his youth at 16, are mentioned therein. The most famous poem is an ecphrasis of an imaginary portrait of the poet's beloved.
