= Al Hamriya, Dubai =

Al Hamriya اﻟﺤﻤﺮﻳﺔ
- Community
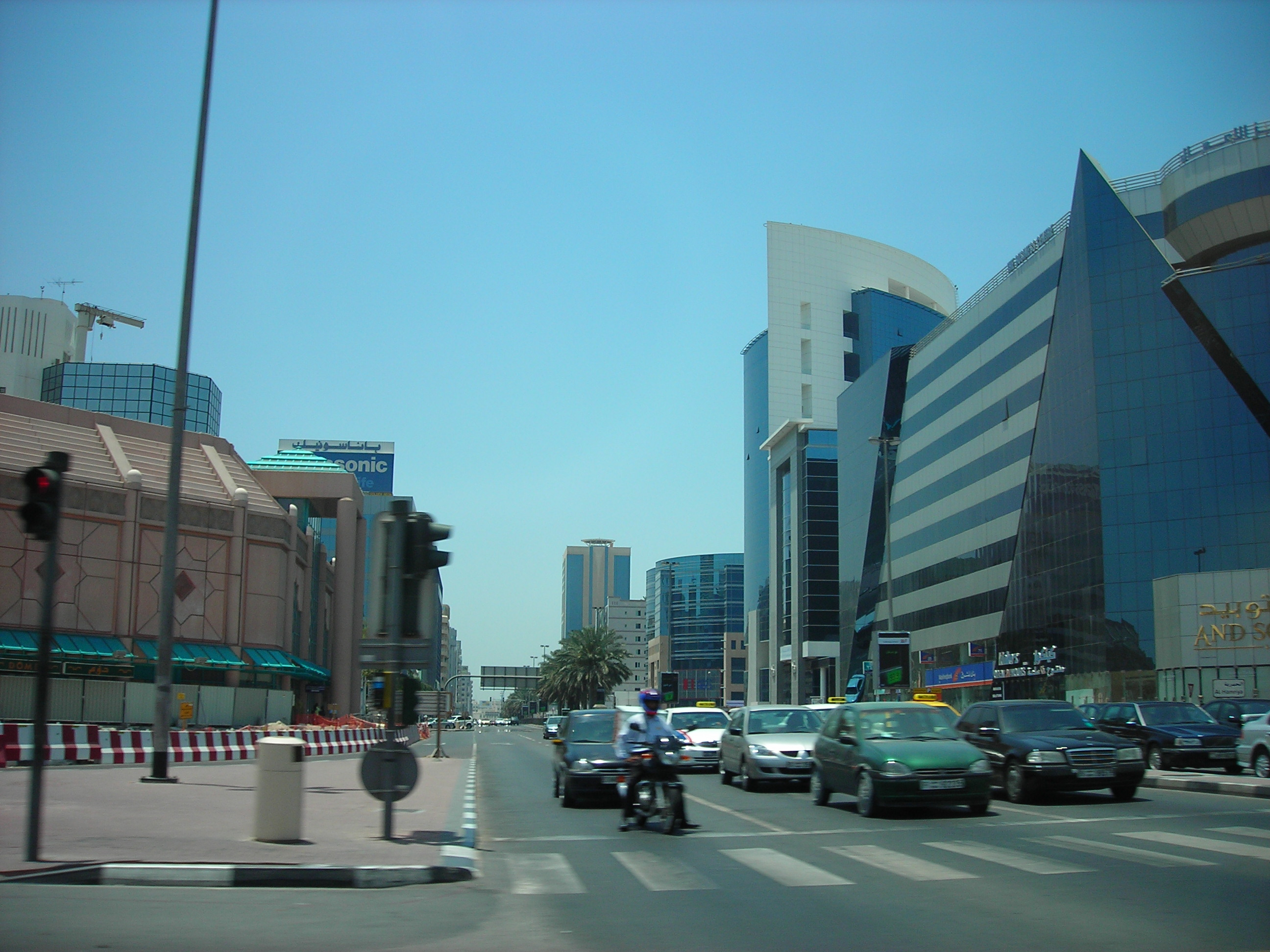
- The intersection of Al Hamriya and Umm Hurair
- Interactive map of Al Hamriya
- Coordinates: 25.25890°N 55.30234°E
- Country: United Arab Emirates
- Emirate: Dubai
- City: Dubai

Area
  - Total: 0.72 km^{2} (0.28 sq mi)

Population (2000)
  - Total: 15,104
  - Density: 21,000/km^{2} (54,000/sq mi)
- Community number: 313

Al Hamriya (Arabic: اﻟﺤﻤﺮﻳﺔ) is a locality in Dubai, United Arab Emirates (UAE). It is located in western Dubai, along Dubai Creek in Bur Dubai. Al Hamriya is largely a residential area; however several shopping complexes and foreign consulates are in its proximity. Dubai Creek is to the north; the locality of Al Souk Al Kabir and Umm Hurair are located to its west and east, respectively.

Important landmarks near or in Al Hamriya include BurJuman, National Bank of Umm Al Quwain, Abu Dhabi Commercial Bank, Al Musallah Tower, and Four Points by Sheraton. Some of the consulates in the area include those of India, the United Kingdom, Oman, Saudi Arabia and Kuwait.
