= List of Romanian football transfers summer 2016 =

This is a list of Romanian football transfers for the 2016 summer transfer window. Only moves featuring 2016–17 Liga I are listed.

== Liga I ==
=== Astra Giurgiu ===
In:

No.	Pos.	Nation	Player
—	MF	ROU	Silviu Balaure (From Baia Mare)
—	MF	JPN	Takayuki Seto (On loan from (Turkey) Osmanlıspor)
—	DF	ALB	Kristi Vangjeli (From (Albania) Skënderbeu Korçë)
—	DF	BRA	Fabrício Dornellas (From (Thailand) Muangthong United)
—	DF	ROU	Cristian Săpunaru (From Pandurii Târgu Jiu)
—	MF	ROU	Viorel Nicoară (From (Israel) Maccabi Petah Tikva)
—	DF	NED	Vlatko Lazić (From (Netherlands) NAC Breda)
—	FW	ROU	Constantin Budescu (On loan from (China) Dalian Yifang)
—	FW	NED	Romario Kortzorg (From Dinamo București)

Out:

No.	Pos.	Nation	Player
—	DF	ROU	Adrian Scarlatache (To (Azerbaijan) Inter Baku)
—	DF	POR	Pedro Queirós (To (Portugal) Chaves)
—	DF	ROU	Valerică Găman (To (Turkey) Karabükspor)
—	FW	LBR	Sekou Oliseh (To (China) Dalian Yifang)
—	MF	ROU	Iulian Roșu (To ACS Poli Timișoara)
—	DF	ROU	Radu Crișan (On loan to Academica Clinceni, previously bought from Universitatea Cluj)
—	MF	ROU	Mihai Butean (On loan to Academica Clinceni, previously bought from Universitatea Cluj)
—	MF	BRA	Fernando Boldrin (To Steaua București)
—	MF	BRA	William De Amorim (To Steaua București)
—	DF	ALB	Kristi Vangjeli (To (Albania) Skënderbeu Korçë)

=== Botoșani ===
In:

No.	Pos.	Nation	Player
—	MF	ROU	Cătălin Golofca (Loan return from Rapid CFR Suceava)
—	MF	ROU	Claudiu Juncănaru (Loan return from Bucovina Pojorâta)
—	FW	ROU	Andrei Herghelegiu (From Universitatea Craiova)
—	FW	ROU	Victoraș Astafei (From (Turkey) Adana Demirspor, previously on loan at Petrolul Ploiești)
—	MF	ROU	Mihai Roman (From (France) Toulouse)
—	GK	ROU	Călin Albuț (From Gaz Metan Mediaș)
—	MF	ROU	Răzvan Greu (From Universitatea Cluj)
—	FW	ROU	Lóránd Fülöp (From Sepsi OSK)
—	FW	BRA	Willie (From (Brazil) Bragantino)
—	FW	ROU	Róbert Elek (From ACS Poli Timișoara)
—	DF	ROU	Andrei Burcă (From Bacău)

Out:

No.	Pos.	Nation	Player
—	FW	CUW	Quenten Martinus (To (Japan) Yokohama F. Marinos)
—	FW	ROU	Dan Roman (To Politehnica Iași)
—	DF	CMR	Michael Ngadeu-Ngadjui (To (Czech Republic) Slavia Prague)
—	FW	ROU	Attila Hadnagy (To Sepsi OSK)
—	GK	ROU	Răzvan Pleșca (Loan return to Gaz Metan Mediaș)
—	MF	ROU	Flavius Cuedan (To Free agent)
—	MF	ESP	José Casado (To Free agent)
—	FW	ROU	Vlad Bujor (To Foresta Suceava)
—	MF	ROU	Petre Ivanovici (To Voluntari)
—	DF	ROU	Marius Tomozei (To Mioveni)
—	MF	ESP	Fernando Carralero (To (Spain) San Fernando)
—	MF	ARG	Gonzalo Cabrera (To (Saudi Arabia) Al-Faisaly)

=== CFR Cluj ===
In:

No.	Pos.	Nation	Player
—	DF	ROU	Andrei Peteleu (From Petrolul Ploiești)
—	MF	ROU	Alexandru Neagu (From Academica Clinceni)
—	FW	ROU	László Hodgyai (From (Hungary) Ferencvárosi TC II)
—	DF	ROU	Laurențiu Rus (From Voluntari)
—	MF	ROU	Alexandru Chiriță (From Free agent)
—	MF	ROU	Cosmin Sârbu (From Baia Mare)
—	MF	CRO	Tomislav Gomelt (On loan from (Italy) Bari)
—	FW	FRA	Billel Omrani (From (France) Marseille)
—	FW	ROU	Dan Roman (From CSM Politehnica Iași)
—	MF	CRO	Tomislav Šorša (From (Croatia) Osijek)

Out:

No.	Pos.	Nation	Player
—	FW	CMR	Steve Beleck (Loan return to (Italy) Fiorentina)
—	MF	POR	Vítor Bruno (To (Portugal) Feirense)
—	DF	POR	Dani (To (Portugal) Vizela)
—	FW	AUS	Anthony Carter (To Free agent)
—	DF	ROU	Lucian Goian (To (India) Mumbai City)
—	GK	ROU	Răzvan Began (To CFR Cluj II, previously on loan at Farul Constanța)
—	MF	ITA	Davide Petrucci (To (Turkey) Çaykur Rizespor)
—	FW	ESP	Cristian López (To (France) Lens)
—	MF	CRO	Antonio Jakoliš (To Steaua București)
—	FW	POR	Guima (To Free agent)

=== Concordia Chiajna ===
In:

No.	Pos.	Nation	Player
—	MF	ROU	Silviu Pană (Loan return from Brașov)
—	DF	ROU	Cristian Melinte (From ACS Poli Timișoara)
—	DF	ROU	Cristian Albu (From Concordia II Chiajna)
—	MF	ROU	Răzvan Grădinaru (From Steaua București, previously on loan)
—	MF	ROU	Daniel Rogoveanu (From Concordia II Chiajna)
—	FW	ROU	Marian Constantinescu (From Concordia II Chiajna)
—	FW	ROU	Ovidiu Marin (From Concordia II Chiajna)
—	MF	ROU	Alin Buleică (From Pandurii Târgu Jiu, previously on loan)
—	GK	ROU	Virgil Drăghia (From Rapid București)
—	DF	NED	Milano Koenders (From Free agent)
—	MF	ROU	Raul Costin (From Târgu Mureș)

Out:

No.	Pos.	Nation	Player
—	MF	ROU	Florin Purece (To Viitorul Constanța)
—	GK	ROU	Florin Matache (To Academica Clinceni)
—	DF	ROU	Nicușor Fota (Loan to Academica Clinceni, previously on loan at Rapid București)
—	DF	ROU	Marian Marin (To Academica Clinceni, previously on loan at Brașov)
—	MF	ROU	Marius Cocîrlă (On loan to Academica Clinceni)
—	DF	ROU	Andrei Voineag (To Concordia II Chiajna, previously on loan at Universitatea Cluj)
—	DF	SEN	Ibrahima Niasse (To (India) Delhi Dynamos)
—	MF	ROU	Gabriel Giurgiu (To Free agent)
—	FW	ITA	Gabriele Zerbo (To (Italy) Paganese)
—	FW	UKR	Artem Milevskyi (To (Russia) Tosno)
—	DF	NGR	Michael Odibe (To (Kazakhstan) Akzhayik)
—	MF	NGR	Christian Obodo (To Pandurii Târgu Jiu)
—	MF	ROU	Cristian Ciobanu (To Concordia II Chiajna, previously on loan at Universitatea Cluj)
—	GK	ROU	Alexandru Gudea (On loan to Unirea Tărlungeni)
—	MF	POR	Bruno Madeira (To Free agent, previously on loan at Brașov)
—	FW	ROU	Florin Răsdan (On loan to Brașov)

=== CSM Politehnica Iași ===
In:

No.	Pos.	Nation	Player
—	MF	ROU	Marius Chelaru (Loan return from Metalurgistul Cugir)
—	FW	MDA	Alexandru Boiciuc (Loan return from Rapid CFR Suceava)
—	MF	ROU	Alexandru Ciucur (From Pandurii Târgu Jiu)
—	FW	ROU	Dan Roman (From Botoșani)
—	MF	ROU	Mădălin Martin (From Rapid București)
—	DF	PHI	Daisuke Sato (From (Philippines) Global)
—	MF	ROU	Cătălin Ștefănescu (On loan from Steaua București, previously on loan at Voluntari)

Out:

No.	Pos.	Nation	Player
—	FW	BIH	Bojan Golubović (To Steaua București)
—	GK	ROU	Nicușor Grecu (To Free agent, previously on loan at Universitatea Cluj)
—	DF	ROU	Andu Moisii (On loan to Știința Miroslava, previously on loan at Bucovina Pojorâta)
—	MF	ROU	Alin Huțanu (On loan to Știința Miroslava, previously on loan at Metalurgistul Cugir)
—	MF	ALB	Azdren Llullaku (To Gaz Metan Mediaș)
—	FW	NGR	Gomo Onduku (To (Morocco) Wydad Casablanca)
—	MF	ROU	Andrei Enescu (To (Cyprus) Ethnikos Achna)
—	MF	POR	Nuno Viveiros (To (Portugal) União da Madeira)
—	MF	ROU	Petre Goge (To Brașov)
—	FW	ROU	Dan Roman (To CFR Cluj)

=== Universitatea Craiova ===
In:

No.	Pos.	Nation	Player
—	DF	ROU	Marius Briceag (Loan return from Voluntari)
—	GK	MDA	Nicolae Calancea (From Voluntari)
—	FW	CPV	Rambé (From (Portugal) Braga B, previously on loan at (Portugal) Farense)
—	MF	BRA	Gustavo (From (Italy) Messina)
—	DF	CRO	Renato Kelić (From (Hungary) Puskás Akadémia)

Out:

No.	Pos.	Nation	Player
—	DF	ROU	Silviu Izvoranu (To Free agent)
—	FW	ROU	Andrei Herghelegiu (To Botoșani)
—	DF	ROU	Sebastian Achim (To (Hungary) Gyirmót)
—	DF	BUL	Valentin Iliev (To Free agent)
—	MF	ROU	Viorel Ferfelea (To Academica Clinceni)
—	FW	ROU	Costin Curelea (To Free agent)
—	GK	ROU	Cătălin Straton (To ACS Poli Timișoara)
—	FW	ROU	Sergiu Jurj (On loan to (Italy) Verona, previously on loan at Baia Mare)

=== Dinamo București ===
In:

No.	Pos.	Nation	Player
—	DF	ROU	Alin Dudea (Loan return from Rapid CFR Suceava)
—	MF	ROU	Andrei Tîrcoveanu (Loan return from Gaz Metan Mediaș)
—	GK	ROU	Laurențiu Brănescu (Loan from (Italy) Juventus, previously on loan at (Cyprus) Omonia)
—	MF	DEN	Azer Bušuladžić (From (Denmark) OB)
—	DF	ARG	Maximiliano Oliva (From (Argentina) Crucero del Norte)
—	GK	PAN	Jaime Penedo (From (Costa Rica) Deportivo Saprissa)
—	DF	ESP	José Romera (From (Czech Republic) Jablonec)
—	GK	ROU	Alberto Cobrea (From Petrolul Ploiești)
—	FW	ROU	Daniel Popa (From Chindia Târgoviște)
—	DF	CRO	Luka Marić (From (Iran) Persepolis)
—	MF	ROU	Dan Nistor (From Pandurii Târgu Jiu)
—	FW	SVK	Adam Nemec (From (Netherlands) Willem II)
—	MF	RSA	May Mahlangu (From (Belgium) Sint-Truidense)

Out:

No.	Pos.	Nation	Player
—	MF	CMR	Patrick Ekeng (†)
—	DF	CRO	Ante Puljić (Loan return to (Belgium) Gent)
—	MF	FRO	Leo Bartalsstovu (To (Iceland) FH)
—	FW	NED	Romario Kortzorg (To Astra Giurgiu)
—	GK	ROU	Victor Rîmniceanu (To Viitorul Constanța)
—	GK	LTU	Vytautas Černiauskas (To (Cyprus) Ermis Aradippou)
—	FW	ROU	Paul Batin (To (Poland) Miedź Legnica)
—	DF	ROU	Constantin Dima (On loan to Metalul Reșița)
—	DF	ROU	Vlad Georgescu (To Dinamo II București, previously on loan at Brașov)
—	MF	ROU	Darius Buia (To Dinamo II București, previously on loan at Academica Clinceni)
—	FW	ROU	Fabian Himcinschi (To Performanța Ighiu, previously on loan)
—	FW	ROU	Kevin Trabalka (To Dinamo II București)
—	DF	ROU	Andrei Radu (To (Cyprus) Aris Limassol, previously on loan at Berceni)
—	MF	ROU	Eric Bicfalvi (To (Russia) Tom Tomsk)
—	GK	ROU	Vlad Muțiu (Loan to Râmnicu Vâlcea)
—	FW	CMR	Marcel Essombé (To (Azerbaijan) Gabala)
—	MF	ROU	Bogdan Gavrilă (To (Cyprus) Ethnikos Achna, previously on loan at Petrolul Ploiești)
—	MF	ROU	Paul Anton (On loan to (Spain) Getafe)
—	GK	ROU	Iustin Popescu (On loan to Unirea Tărlungeni, previously on loan at Petrolul Ploiești)
—	DF	ROU	Andrei Marc (To (Turkey) Şanlıurfaspor)
—	DF	SLO	Miha Mevlja (To (Russia) Rostov)

=== Gaz Metan Mediaș ===
In:

No.	Pos.	Nation	Player
—	GK	ROU	Răzvan Pleșca (Loan return from Botoșani)
—	DF	ROU	Sergiu Muth (From Târgu Mureș)
—	FW	ROU	Cristian Gavra (Loan from Viitorul Constanța)
—	FW	ROU	Mircea Axente (From (Israel) Maccabi Netanya)
—	MF	ALB	Azdren Llullaku (From Politehnica Iași)
—	DF	ROU	Valentin Crețu (From (Germany) Energie Cottbus)
—	DF	SRB	Jasmin Trtovac (From (Serbia) Novi Pazar)
—	DF	SRB	Aleksandar Šušnjar (From (Lithuania) Lietava Jonava)
—	MF	BRA	Eric Pereira (From (Saudi Arabia) Najran)
—	MF	ROU	Sabin Lupu (From Măgura Cisnădie)
—	DF	CRO	Dario Rugašević (From (Croatia) Cibalia)

Out:

No.	Pos.	Nation	Player
—	MF	ROU	Andrei Tîrcoveanu (Loan return to Dinamo București)
—	MF	ROU	Paul Iacob (Loan return to Viitorul Constanța)
—	GK	ROU	Călin Albuț (To Botoșani)
—	GK	ROU	Ciprian Botoșer (To Free agent)
—	DF	ROU	Ioan Neag (To Râmnicu Vâlcea)
—	DF	ROU	Lucian Cazan (To Voluntari)
—	MF	ROU	Alexandru Neacșa (To Hermannstadt)
—	MF	ROU	Andrei Florean (To Free agent)
—	MF	ROU	Tiberiu Petriș (To Free agent)
—	MF	ROU	Horia Răduț (To Free agent)
—	MF	ROU	Raul Ignat (To Gaz Metan Mediaș II)
—	DF	ROU	George Neagu (To ACS Poli Timișoara)
—	MF	ROU	Liviu Băjenaru (To Juventus București)
—	FW	ROU	Marius Staicu (To Mioveni)
—	FW	ITA	Cosimo Figliomeni (To Free agent)

=== Pandurii Târgu Jiu ===
In:

No.	Pos.	Nation	Player
—	GK	ROU	Răzvan Negrilă (Loan return from Farul Constanța)
—	MF	ROU	Valentin Munteanu (Loan return from Farul Constanța)
—	MF	ROU	Claudiu Voiculeț (From Târgu Mureș)
—	MF	ROU	Adelin Pîrcălabu (From Pandurii II Târgu Jiu)
—	MF	ROU	Ovidiu Herea (From (Greece) Xanthi)
—	MF	ESP	Armiche Ortega (From (Spain) Barakaldo)
—	MF	NGR	Christian Obodo (From Concordia Chiajna)
—	DF	NED	Jordy Buijs (From (Netherlands) Roda JC Kerkrade)
—	MF	ROU	Lucian Sânmărtean (From (Saudi Arabia) Al-Ittihad)
—	FW	ROU	Valentin Alexandru (From Dunărea Călărași)
—	FW	ROU	George Țucudean (From (England) Charlton Athletic, previously on loan at Târgu Mureș)
—	MF	ROU	Cătălin Hlistei (From UTA Arad)
—	MF	ROU	Liviu Antal (On loan from (Israel) Hapoel Tel Aviv)

Out:

No.	Pos.	Nation	Player
—	FW	BRA	Wellington (To (Cyprus) AEL Limassol)
—	MF	ROU	Alexandru Ciucur (To Politehnica Iași)
—	MF	ROU	Adrian Ropotan (To (United Arab Emirates) Hatta Club)
—	MF	ROU	Mihai Răduț (To (United Arab Emirates) Hatta Club)
—	DF	POR	Vasco Fernandes (To (Portugal) Vitória de Setúbal)
—	GK	POR	Pedro Mingote (To Târgu Mureș)
—	DF	BRA	Erico (To Free agent)
—	MF	CZE	Lukáš Droppa (To (Russia) Tom Tomsk)
—	MF	ROU	Viorel Nicoară (To (Israel) Maccabi Petah Tikva)
—	DF	ROU	Bogdan Șandru (On loan to Dunărea Călărași, previously on loan at Universitatea Cluj)
—	DF	ROU	Cristian Săpunaru (To Astra Giurgiu)
—	MF	ROU	Alin Buleică (To Concordia Chiajna, previously on loan)
—	FW	ROU	Ioan Hora (To (Turkey) Konyaspor)
—	MF	ROU	Carlo Erdei (On loan to Olimpia Satu Mare, previously on loan at Universitatea Cluj)
—	FW	ROU	Daniel Mărgărit (On loan to SS Politehnica Timișoara)
—	MF	ROU	Bogdan Dănăricu (On loan to SS Politehnica Timișoara)
—	MF	ROU	Alexandru Dan (On loan to Metalul Reșița, previously on loan at Universitatea Cluj)
—	DF	ROU	Florin Acsinte (To Voluntari)
—	MF	ROU	Dan Nistor (To Dinamo București)
—	MF	ESP	Armiche Ortega (To (Spain) Burgos)

=== Poli Timișoara ===
In:

No.	Pos.	Nation	Player
—	FW	ROU	Andrei Artean (Loan return from Râmnicu Vâlcea)
—	MF	ROU	Mădălin Livan (Loan return from Brașov)
—	DF	ROU	Denis Hăruț (From Poli II Timișoara)
—	FW	ROU	Cristian Pădurariu (From Poli II Timișoara)
—	DF	ROU	Daniel Vădrariu (From Dunărea Călărași)
—	DF	ROU	George Neagu (From Gaz Metan Mediaș)
—	MF	ROU	Alexandru Popovici (From Free agent)
—	FW	ROU	Cătălin Vraciu (From SC Bacău)
—	FW	ROU	Octavian Drăghici (From (Lebanon) Racing Beirut)
—	DF	ROU	Alin Șeroni (From (Moldova) Speranța Nisporeni)
—	GK	ROU	Cătălin Straton (From Universitatea Craiova)
—	GK	ROU	Vasile Curileac (From Free agent)
—	DF	ROU	Bogdan Străuț (From Baia Mare)
—	MF	ROU	Iulian Roșu (From Astra Giurgiu)
—	MF	ROU	Alin Cârstocea (From Viitorul Constanța)
—	DF	CRO	Leopold Novak (From (Bosnia and Herzegovina) Vitez)
—	MF	ESP	Fernando Llorente (From (Portugal) Belenenses)

Out:

No.	Pos.	Nation	Player
—	GK	SEN	Lys Gomis (Loan return to (Italy) Torino)
—	MF	ISR	Bar Aharoni (Loan return to (Israel) Maccabi Netanya)
—	GK	ISR	Ram Strauss (To (Belgium) OH Leuven)
—	FW	CUW	Everon Pisas (To (Netherlands) Dordrecht)
—	MF	ESP	Fernando Llorente (To (Portugal) Belenenses)
—	MF	ESP	Abel Suárez (To (Spain) Pontevedra)
—	MF	ROU	Ovidiu Popescu (To Steaua București)
—	DF	ROU	Dan Popescu (To Steaua București)
—	MF	ROU	Ianis Zicu (To ASA Târgu Mureș)
—	FW	ENG	Alex Nimely (To Viitorul Constanța)
—	DF	ESP	Manu Torres (To (Spain) Sabadell)
—	MF	ROU	Cristian Boldea (To Free agent)
—	MF	ESP	Javi Hernández (To (Poland) Górnik Łęczna)
—	MF	ENG	Ross Jenkins (To Free agent)
—	FW	CUW	Prince Rajcomar (To Free agent)
—	FW	ROU	Dorin Goga (To Free agent)
—	DF	ROU	Claudiu Belu-Iordache (To Târgu Mureș)
—	FW	ROU	Róbert Elek (To Botoșani)

=== Steaua București ===
In:

No.	Pos.	Nation	Player
—	MF	ROU	Sebastian Chitoșcă (Loan return from Voluntari)
—	MF	ROU	Rareș Enceanu (Loan return from Voluntari)
—	MF	ROU	Robert Vâlceanu (Loan return from Voluntari)
—	FW	ROU	Alexandru Tudorie (Loan return from Voluntari)
—	FW	ROU	Theodor Botă (Loan return from Gloria Buzău)
—	FW	BIH	Bojan Golubović (From Politehnica Iași)
—	MF	ROU	Ovidiu Popescu (From ACS Poli Timișoara)
—	DF	ROU	Dan Popescu (From ACS Poli Timișoara)
—	MF	CRO	Adnan Aganović (From (Cyprus) AEL Limassol)
—	MF	ROU	Vlad Achim (From Voluntari)
—	DF	ROU	Gabriel Simion (From Steaua Academy)
—	MF	ROU	Mario Mihai (From Steaua Academy)
—	DF	ROU	Bogdan Mitrea (On loan from (Italy) Ascoli)
—	FW	ROU	Florin Tănase (From Viitorul Constanța)
—	MF	BRA	Fernando Boldrin (From Astra Giurgiu)
—	MF	BRA	William De Amorim (From Astra Giurgiu)
—	MF	CRO	Antonio Jakoliš (From CFR Cluj)
—	GK	ROU	Eduard Stăncioiu (From Târgu Mureș)
—	MF	COD	Wilfred Moke (From Voluntari)
—	FW	ROU	Dennis Man (From UTA Arad)

Out:

No.	Pos.	Nation	Player
—	FW	JOR	Tha'er Bawab (To (Qatar) Umm Salal)
—	DF	ROU	Cornel Râpă (To (Poland) Pogoń Szczecin)
—	DF	ROU	Paul Pârvulescu (To (Austria) St. Pölten, previously on loan at Târgu Mureș)
—	MF	GER	Timo Gebhart (To (Germany) Hansa Rostock)
—	MF	MAR	Houssine Kharja (To Free agent)
—	FW	ROU	Ciprian Marica (To Free agent)
—	DF	ROU	Paul Papp (To (Switzerland) FC Wil)
—	DF	MDA	Cătălin Carp (To Viitorul Constanța)
—	FW	ROU	Gabriel Iancu (To Viitorul Constanța, previously on loan at (Turkey) Karabükspor)
—	MF	ROU	Doru Popadiuc (To Voluntari)
—	MF	ROU	Ionuț Neagu (To (Turkey) Karabükspor, previously on loan)
—	MF	ROU	Răzvan Grădinaru (To Concordia Chiajna, previously on loan)
—	MF	NED	Nicandro Breeveld (To (United Arab Emirates) Dibba Al-Fujairah)
—	MF	ROU	Florentin Pham (To Steaua II București, previously on loan at Academica Clinceni)
—	MF	ROU	Daniel Benzar (To Steaua II București, previously on loan at Academica Clinceni)
—	MF	ROU	Alexandru Aldea (To Steaua II București, previously on loan at Sporting Turnu Măgurele)
—	FW	ROU	Alexandru Târnovan (To Free agent, previously on loan at Universitatea Cluj)
—	MF	ROU	Alexandru Chipciu (To (Belgium) Anderlecht)
—	FW	FRA	Grégory Tadé (To Qatar SC)
—	DF	CPV	Fernando Varela (To (Greece) PAOK)
—	MF	ROU	Cătălin Ștefănescu (On loan to CSM Politehnica Iași, previously on loan at Voluntari)
—	MF	ALG	Aymen Tahar (To (Japan) Sagan Tosu, previously on loan at (Portugal) Boavista)
—	DF	HAI	Jean Sony Alcénat (To (Portugal) Feirense, previously on loan at Voluntari)
—	MF	ROU	Nicolae Stanciu (To (Belgium) Anderlecht)
—	GK	ROU	Valentin Cojocaru (On loan to (Italy) Crotone)
—	MF	ALG	Jugurtha Hamroun (On loan to (Qatar) Al Sadd)

=== Târgu Mureș ===
In:

No.	Pos.	Nation	Player
—	MF	ROU	Carlos Cherteș (Loan return from Academica Clinceni)
—	FW	NGR	Benjamin Kuku (Loan return from Academica Clinceni)
—	MF	ROU	Ianis Zicu (From Poli Timișoara)
—	DF	ROU	Alin Dobrosavlevici (From Academica Clinceni)
—	DF	ROU	Andrei Cordoș (From Free agent)
—	MF	ROU	Emil Dică (From Baia Mare)
—	FW	ROU	Alexandru Ioniță (From Farul Constanța)
—	MF	ROU	Mihai Petra (From Unirea Tărlungeni)
—	GK	ROU	Bogdan Moga (From ASA II Târgu Mureș)
—	GK	ROU	Alexandru Podar (From ASA II Târgu Mureș)
—	MF	ROU	Yasin Hamed (From ASA II Târgu Mureș)
—	MF	ROU	Robert Szasz (From ASA II Târgu Mureș)
—	FW	ROU	Sergiu Păcurar (From ASA II Târgu Mureș)
—	DF	ROU	Tamas Szasz (From ASA II Târgu Mureș)
—	DF	ROU	Sebastian Bucur (From Dinamo București)
—	FW	ROU	Octavian Ursu (From Universitatea Cluj)
—	MF	FRA	Florent André (From Free agent)
—	MF	SEN	Gaston Mendy (From Free agent)
—	FW	ROU	Romeo Surdu (From (Moldova) Milsami Orhei)
—	DF	ROU	Claudiu Belu-Iordache (From ACS Poli Timișoara)
—	FW	ROU	Ronaldo Deaconu (From Free agent)
—	MF	ROU	Raul Costin (From Rapid București)
—	FW	ROU	Ciprian Rus (From UTA Arad)
—	FW	ROU	Vlad Morar (From Rapid București)
—	GK	POR	Pedro Mingote (From Pandurii Târgu Jiu)

Out:

No.	Pos.	Nation	Player
—	FW	ROU	George Țucudean (Loan return to (England) Charlton Athletic)
—	DF	ROU	Paul Pârvulescu (Loan return to Steaua București)
—	DF	MNE	Saša Balić (To (Bosnia and Herzegovina) FK Sarajevo)
—	MF	ARG	Nicolás Gorobsov (To (Israel) Hapoel Tel Aviv)
—	DF	ESP	Iván González (To (Spain) Alcorcón)
—	DF	ROU	Sergiu Muth (To Gaz Metan Mediaș)
—	MF	ARG	Pablo Brandán (To Viitorul Constanța)
—	FW	ROU	Adrian Mutu (Retired)
—	MF	ROU	Claudiu Voiculeț (To Pandurii Târgu Jiu)
—	FW	ARG	Ramiro Costa (To (Argentina) Atlético de Rafaela)
—	MF	CRO	Filip Jazvić (To (Israel) Hapoel Haifa)
—	DF	ESP	Javier Velayos (To (Spain) Racing Ferrol)
—	DF	ROU	Szabolcs Török (To ASA II Târgu Mureș)
—	FW	ROU	Răzvan Stoica (To ASA II Târgu Mureș)
—	MF	BRA	Bruno Martins (To Free agent, previously on loan at Academica Clinceni)
—	MF	MDA	Alexandru Dedov (To (Moldova) Milsami Orhei)
—	MF	SEN	Ousmane N'Doye (To Cetate Deva)
—	MF	ROU	Laurențiu Buș (To (Israel) Hapoel Nir Ramat HaSharon)
—	DF	ROU	Ionuț Balaur (To Voluntari)
—	GK	ROU	Csongor Fejér (To Sepsi OSK)
—	GK	ROU	Eduard Stăncioiu (To Steaua București)
—	MF	ROU	Raul Costin (To Concordia Chiajna)

=== Viitorul Constanța ===
In:

No.	Pos.	Nation	Player
—	DF	ROU	Bogdan Mitache (Loan return from Voluntari)
—	DF	ROU	Bogdan Țîru (Loan return from Voluntari)
—	MF	ROU	Bogdan Vasile (Loan return from Chindia Târgoviște)
—	MF	ROU	Adrian Neniță (Loan return from Chindia Târgoviște)
—	MF	ROU	Antonio Cruceru (Loan return from SCM Pitești)
—	MF	ROU	Alexandru Stoica (Loan return from Dunărea Călărași)
—	FW	ROU	Ionuț Vînă (Loan return from Dunărea Călărași)
—	GK	ROU	Victor Rîmniceanu (From Dinamo București)
—	MF	ARG	Pablo Brandán (From Târgu Mureș)
—	MF	ROU	Florin Purece (From Concordia Chiajna)
—	DF	ROU	Sorin Rădoi (From Voluntari)
—	FW	ROU	Gabriel Iancu (From Steaua București, previously on loan at (Turkey) Karabükspor)
—	DF	MDA	Cătălin Carp (From Steaua București)
—	FW	ENG	Alex Nimely (From ACS Poli Timișoara)
—	FW	ROU	Alexandru Mățan (From Viitorul II Constanța)
—	MF	ESP	Dani López (From (Cyprus) Doxa Katokopias)

Out:

No.	Pos.	Nation	Player
—	DF	ROU	Robert Hasnăș (To FC Bistrița, previously on loan at Unirea Dej)
—	GK	ROU	Vlad Hînțăscu (To Free agent, previously on loan at Rapid CFR Suceava)
—	DF	FRA	Hérold Goulon (To Free agent)
—	MF	ROU	Bănel Nicoliță (To Free agent)
—	MF	ROU	Răzvan Acostăchioae (On loan to Atletico Vaslui, previously on loan at Bucovina Pojorâta)
—	DF	ROU	Cătălin Toriște (On loan to Metalurgistul Cugir, previously on loan at Mioveni)
—	MF	ROU	Denis Drăguș (To Viitorul II Constanța)
—	GK	BRA	Peterson Peçanha (To (Portugal) Feirense)
—	MF	ESP	Pablo de Lucas (To (Greece) Xanthi)
—	MF	ROU	Florin Cernat (To Voluntari)
—	FW	ROU	Cristian Gavra (On loan to Gaz Metan Mediaș)
—	DF	ROU	Mihai Șandru (To SCM Pitești, previously on loan)
—	FW	ROU	Robert Grecu (To SCM Pitești, previously on loan)
—	GK	ROU	Cătălin Căbuz (On loan to FC Hermannstadt)
—	MF	ROU	Ianis Hagi (To (Italy) Fiorentina)
—	MF	ROU	George Tudoran (On loan to (Cyprus) Alki Oroklini, previously on loan at Rapid București)
—	DF	ROU	Ciprian Perju (On loan to Academica Clinceni)
—	MF	ROU	Alin Cârstocea (To ACS Poli Timișoara)
—	FW	ROU	Florin Tănase (To Steaua București)
—	MF	ROU	Paul Iacob (On loan to Brașov, previously on loan at Gaz Metan Mediaș)
—	MF	ROU	Ioan Filip (To (Hungary) Debrecen)
—	FW	ROU	Vlad Rusu (To Free agent)

=== Voluntari ===
In:

No.	Pos.	Nation	Player
—	MF	ROU	Petre Ivanovici (From Botoșani)
—	MF	ROU	Florin Cernat (From Viitorul Constanța)
—	MF	ROU	Laurențiu Marinescu (From Petrolul Ploiești)
—	MF	ROU	Sorin Tăbăcariu (From Ceahlăul Piatra Neamț)
—	MF	ROU	Alexandru Coman (From Brașov)
—	MF	ROU	Doru Popadiuc (From Steaua București)
—	DF	ROU	Marius Halmaghe (From Voluntari II)
—	MF	ROU	Mihai Căpățînă (From Voluntari II)
—	DF	ROU	Ionuț Balaur (From Târgu Mureș)
—	MF	ROU	Andrei Lungu (From (Germany) Energie Cottbus)
—	DF	ROU	Lucian Cazan (From Gaz Metan Mediaș)
—	DF	ROU	Cosmin Achim (From Voluntari II)
—	DF	ROU	Mircea Leasă (From Voluntari II)
—	MF	ROU	Marius Tudorică (From Voluntari II)
—	MF	ROU	Gabriel Deac (From Voluntari II)
—	FW	ROU	Adrian Voicu (From Voluntari II)
—	DF	ROU	Florin Acsinte (From Pandurii Târgu Jiu)
—	MF	ROU	Costin Lazăr (From (Greece) Iraklis)

Out:

No.	Pos.	Nation	Player
—	DF	HAI	Jean Sony Alcénat (Loan return to Steaua București)
—	MF	ROU	Sebastian Chitoșcă (Loan return to Steaua București)
—	MF	ROU	Cătălin Ștefănescu (Loan return to Steaua București)
—	MF	ROU	Rareș Enceanu (Loan return to Steaua București)
—	MF	ROU	Robert Vâlceanu (Loan return to Steaua București)
—	FW	ROU	Alexandru Tudorie (Loan return to Steaua București)
—	DF	ROU	Bogdan Mitache (Loan return to Viitorul Constanța)
—	DF	ROU	Bogdan Țîru (Loan return to Viitorul Constanța)
—	DF	ROU	Marius Briceag (Loan return to Universitatea Craiova)
—	GK	MDA	Nicolae Calancea (To Universitatea Craiova)
—	DF	ROU	Sorin Rădoi (To Viitorul Constanța)
—	MF	ENG	Jeffrey Monakana (To Free agent)
—	MF	ROU	Laurențiu Iorga (To Free agent)
—	MF	ROU	Sorin Ispir (To Free agent)
—	DF	CRO	Saša Novaković (To (Bosnia and Herzegovina) FK Sarajevo)
—	MF	ROU	Vlad Achim (To Steaua București)
—	MF	CIV	Hamed Koné (To (United Arab Emirates) Dibba Al-Fujairah)
—	DF	ROU	Daniel Barna (To Dunărea Călărași)
—	DF	ROU	Laurențiu Rus (To CFR Cluj)
—	FW	ROU	Daniel Pancu (Retired)
—	MF	ROU	George Călințaru (To Juventus București)
—	MF	COD	Wilfred Moke (To Steaua București)
