= 2016–17 FCSB season =

FCSB
2016–17 season
- President: Valeriu Argăseală
- Manager: Laurențiu Reghecampf
- Stadium: Arena Națională
- Liga I: 2nd
- Cupa României: Round of 16
- Cupa Ligii: Semi-finals
- Champions League: Play-off round
- Europa League: Group stage
- Top goalscorer: League: Denis Alibec; Fernando Boldrin (8 each); All: Denis Alibec (9)
- Highest home attendance: 45,327 vs Manchester City (16 August 2016)
- Lowest home attendance: 550 vs ACS Poli Timișoara (17 December 2016)
| Home colours | Away colours |

The 2016–17 season was FCSB's 69th season since its founding in 1947.

== Players ==
=== First team squad ===
As of 20 February 2017.

Note: Flags indicate national team as defined under FIFA eligibility rules; some limited exceptions apply. Players may hold more than one non-FIFA nationality.

| No. | Pos. | Nation | Player |
|---|---|---|---|
| 1 | GK | ROU | Florin Niță (4th captain) |
| 2 | DF | ROU | Gabriel Simion |
| 4 | DF | ROU | Gabriel Tamaș |
| 5 | MF | ROU | Mihai Pintilii (vice-captain) |
| 7 | FW | ROU | Denis Alibec (captain) |
| 8 | MF | ROU | Lucian Filip (3rd-captain) |
| 9 | FW | ROU | Alexandru Tudorie |
| 10 | FW | ROU | Florin Tănase |
| 11 | MF | GHA | Muniru Sulley |
| 13 | DF | ROU | Marian Pleașcă |
| 14 | DF | ROU | Mihai Bălașa |
| 15 | DF | SRB | Marko Momčilović |

| No. | Pos. | Nation | Player |
|---|---|---|---|
| 17 | MF | CRO | Antonio Jakoliš |
| 18 | MF | ROU | Vlad Mihalcea |
| 20 | MF | ROU | Vlad Achim |
| 21 | DF | COD | Wilfred Moke |
| 23 | MF | ROU | Ovidiu Popescu |
| 27 | MF | BRA | Fernando Boldrin |
| 29 | FW | BRA | William De Amorim |
| 31 | FW | FRA | Harlem Gnohéré |
| 32 | GK | ROU | Ionuț Poiană |
| 33 | GK | ROU | Eduard Stăncioiu |
| 44 | DF | ROU | Gabriel Enache |
| 98 | FW | ROU | Dennis Man |

=== Transfers ===
==== In ====
| No. | Pos. | Nat. | Name | Age | EU | Moving from | Type | Transfer window | Ends | Transfer fee | Source |
|---|---|---|---|---|---|---|---|---|---|---|---|
| 22 | MF | (Romania) | Paul Pârvulescu | 27 | EU | Târgu Mureș | Loan return | Summer | 2017 | — | |
| 14 | FW | (Bosnia and Herzegovina) | Bojan Golubović | 32 | Non-EU | CSMS Iași | Free transfer | Summer | 2017 | Free | Steaua Facebook |
| 23 | MF | (Romania) | Ovidiu Popescu | 22 | EU | ACS Poli Timișoara | Transfer | Summer | 2021 | € 200.000 | Steaua Facebook |
| 24 | DF | (Romania) | Dan Popescu | 28 | EU | ACS Poli Timișoara | Transfer | Summer | Undisclosed | Free | Steaua Facebook |
| 80 | FW | (Romania) | Gabriel Iancu | 22 | EU | Kardemir Karabükspor (Turkey) | Loan return | Summer | 2018 | — | |
| 26 | MF | (Romania) | Ionuț Neagu | 26 | EU | Kardemir Karabükspor (Turkey) | Loan return | Summer | 2017 | — | |
| — | MF | (England) (Algeria) | Aymen Tahar | 26 | EU | Boavista (Portugal) | Loan return | Summer | 2019 | — | |
| — | MF | (Romania) | Răzvan Grădinaru | 20 | EU | Concordia Chiajna | Loan return | Summer | Undisclosed | — | |
| 28 | FW | (Romania) | Alexandru Târnovan | 20 | EU | Universitatea Cluj | Loan return | Summer | Undisclosed | — | |
| 35 | DF | (Romania) | Alexandru Aldea (footballer) | 21 | EU | Sporting Turnu Măgurele | Loan return | Summer | Undisclosed | — | |
| 22 | DF | (Haiti) | Jean Sony Alcénat | 30 | Non-EU | Voluntari | Loan return | Summer | 2018 | — | |
| 9 | FW | (Romania) | Alexandru Tudorie | 20 | EU | Voluntari | Loan return | Summer | 2020 | — | |
| 26 | MF | (Romania) | Cătălin Ștefănescu | 21 | EU | Voluntari | Loan return | Summer | 2020 | — | |
| 35 | MF | (Romania) | Sebastian Chitoșcă | 21 | EU | Voluntari | Loan return | Summer | 2020 | — | |
| 25 | MF | (Romania) | Rareș Enceanu | 23 | EU | Voluntari | Loan return | Summer | Undisclosed | — | |
| 16 | MF | (Romania) | Robert Vâlceanu | 19 | EU | Voluntari | Loan return | Summer | Undisclosed | — | |
| 31 | DF | (Romania) | Florentin Pham | 19 | EU | Academica Clinceni | Loan return | Summer | Undisclosed | — | |
| — | MF | (Romania) | Daniel Benzar | 18 | EU | Academica Clinceni | Loan return | Summer | Undisclosed | — | |
| 32 | FW | (Romania) | Theodor Botă | 19 | EU | Gloria Buzău | Loan return | Summer | Undisclosed | — | |
| 20 | MF | (Romania) | Vlad Achim | 27 | EU | Voluntari | Transfer | Summer | 2019 | € 200.000 & Doru Popadiuc | steauafc.com |
| 19 | MF | (Croatia) | Adnan Aganović | 28 | EU | AEL Limassol (Cyprus) | Free transfer | Summer | Undisclosed | Free | steauafc.com |
| 3 | DF | (Romania) | Bogdan Mitrea | 28 | EU | Ascoli (Italy) | Loan | Summer | 2017 | — | steauafc.com |
| 10 | FW | (Romania) | Florin Tănase | 21 | EU | Viitorul Constanța | Transfer | Summer | 2021 | € 1.500.000 | steauafc.com |
| 27 | MF | (Portugal) (Brazil) | Fernando Boldrin | 27 | EU | Astra Giurgiu | Transfer | Summer | 2020 | € 300.000 | steauafc.com |
| 29 | MF | (Romania) (Brazil) | William De Amorim | 24 | EU | Astra Giurgiu | Transfer | Summer | 2021 | € 700.000 | steauafc.com |
| 33 | GK | (Romania) | Eduard Stăncioiu | 35 | EU | Târgu Mureș | Transfer | Summer | 2018 | Free | steauafc.com |
| 17 | MF | (Croatia) | Antonio Jakoliš | 24 | EU | CFR Cluj | Transfer | Summer | 2020 | € 350.000 | steauafc.com |
| 21 | MF | (France) (Democratic Republic of the Congo) | Wilfred Moke | 28 | EU | Voluntari | Transfer | Summer | Undisclosed | € 150.000 | steauafc.com |
| 98 | FW | (Romania) | Dennis Man | 18 | EU | UTA Arad | Transfer | Summer | 2022 | € 300.000 & bonuses | steauafc.com |
| 7 | FW | (Romania) | Denis Alibec | 25 | EU | Astra Giurgiu | Transfer | Winter | 2021 | € 2.040.000 | steauafc.com |
| 31 | FW | (France) (Ivory Coast) | Harlem Gnohéré | 28 | EU | Dinamo București | Transfer | Winter | 2020 | € 250.000 | steauafc.com |
| 14 | DF | (Romania) | Mihai Bălașa | 22 | EU | Roma (Italy) | Transfer | Winter | 2021 | € 500.000 | steauafc.com |
| 13 | DF | (Romania) | Marian Pleașcă | 27 | EU | Pandurii Târgu Jiu | Free transfer | Winter | Undisclosed | Free | steauafc.com |

==== Out ====
| No. | Pos. | Nat. | Name | Age | EU | Moving to | Type | Transfer window | Transfer fee | Source |
|---|---|---|---|---|---|---|---|---|---|---|
| 9 | FW | (Romania) | Ciprian Marica | 30 | EU | | Mutual termination | Summer | — | steauafc.com |
| 2 | DF | (Romania) | Cornel Râpă | 26 | EU | Pogoń Szczecin (Poland) | Mutual termination | Summer | — | steauafc.com |
| 22 | MF | (Romania) | Paul Pârvulescu | 27 | EU | St. Pölten (Austria) | Mutual termination | Summer | — | steauafc.com |
| 20 | FW | (Spain) (Jordan) | Tha'er Bawab | 31 | EU | Umm Salal (Qatar) | Mutual termination | Summer | — | steauafc.com |
| 4 | DF | (Romania) (Moldova) | Cătălin Carp | 22 | EU | Viitorul Constanța | Mutual termination | Summer | — | steauafc.com |
| 3 | DF | (Romania) | Paul Papp | 26 | EU | Wil (Switzerland) | Mutual termination | Summer | — | steauafc.com |
| 14 | MF | (France) (Morocco) | Houssine Kharja | 33 | EU | | Mutual termination | Summer | — | |
| 18 | MF | (Germany) | Timo Gebhart | 27 | EU | Hansa Rostock (Germany) | Mutual termination | Summer | — | |
| 80 | FW | (Romania) | Gabriel Iancu | 22 | EU | Viitorul Constanța | Mutual termination | Summer | — | |
| 95 | MF | (Romania) | Doru Popadiuc | 21 | EU | Voluntari | Transfer | Summer | Vlad Achim | steauafc.com |
| 26 | MF | (Romania) | Ionuț Neagu | 26 | EU | Kardemir Karabükspor (Turkey) | Mutual termination | Summer | — | |
| 21 | MF | (Netherlands) (Suriname) | Nicandro Breeveld | 29 | EU | Dibba Al-Fujairah (United Arab Emirates) | End of contract | Summer | — | |
| — | DF | (Romania) | Valeriu Lupu | 25 | EU | Berceni | End of contract | Summer | — | |
| — | MF | (Romania) | Răzvan Grădinaru | 20 | EU | Concordia Chiajna | Transfer | Summer | Undisclosed | |
| 25 | FW | (France) | Grégory Tadé | 29 | EU | Qatar SC | Mutual termination | Summer | — | steauafc.com |
| 7 | MF | (Romania) | Alexandru Chipciu | 27 | EU | Anderlecht (Belgium) | Transfer | Summer | €3,000,000 & bonuses | steauafc.com |
| 33 | DF | (Portugal) (Cape Verde) | Fernando Varela | 28 | EU | PAOK (Greece) | Transfer | Summer | €1,400,000 | steauafc.com |
| 26 | MF | (Romania) | Cătălin Ștefănescu | 21 | EU | CSM Politehnica Iași | Loan | Summer | — | steauafc.com |
| — | MF | (England) (Algeria) | Aymen Tahar | 26 | EU | Sagan Tosu (Japan) | Free transfer | Summer | — | |
| — | DF | (Haiti) | Jean Sony Alcénat | 30 | Non-EU | Feirense (Portugal) | Mutual termination | Summer | — | cdfeirense.pt |
| 10 | MF | (Romania) | Nicolae Stanciu | 23 | EU | Anderlecht (Belgium) | Transfer | Summer | €7,800,000 & bonuses | steauafc.com |
| 12 | GK | (Romania) | Valentin Cojocaru | 20 | EU | Crotone (Italy) | Loan | Summer | €250,000 | steauafc.com |
| 5 | MF | (France) (Algeria) | Jugurtha Hamroun | 27 | EU | Al Sadd (Qatar) | Loan | Summer | €1,000,000 | steauafc.com |
| — | FW | (Romania) | Alexandru Târnovan | 21 | EU | Botoșani | Transfer | Summer | — | |
| 55 | MF | (Romania) | Alexandru Bourceanu | 31 | EU | Arsenal Tula (Russia) | End of contract | Winter | — | |
| 14 | FW | (Bosnia and Herzegovina) | Bojan Golubović | 33 | Non-EU | CSM Politehnica Iași | Mutual termination | Winter | — | steauafc.com |
| 3 | DF | (Romania) | Bogdan Mitrea | 29 | EU | Ascoli (Italy) | End of loan | Winter | — | steauafc.com |
| 13 | DF | (Romania) | Alin Toșca | 24 | EU | Real Betis (Spain) | Transfer | Winter | €1,000,000 | steauafc.com |
| 19 | MF | (Croatia) | Adnan Aganović | 29 | EU | Larissa (Greece) | Mutual termination | Winter | — | steauafc.com |
| 26 | FW | (Romania) | Cristian Onțel | 18 | EU | Academica Clinceni | Loan | Winter | — | |
| 77 | MF | (Romania) | Adrian Popa | 28 | EU | Reading (England) | Transfer | Winter | €600,000 | steauafc.com |
| 16 | MF | (Romania) | Robert Vâlceanu | 19 | EU | UTA Arad | Loan | Winter | — | uta-arad.ro |
| 24 | DF | (Romania) | Dan Popescu | 28 | EU | Concordia Chiajna | Loan | Winter | — | steauafc.com |
| 25 | MF | (Romania) | Rareș Enceanu | 22 | EU | Brașov | Loan | Winter | — | steauafc.com |
| 35 | MF | (Romania) | Sebastian Chitoșcă | 24 | EU | Brașov | Loan | Winter | — | steauafc.com |

==== Spending ====
Summer: ▼€3,700,000

Winter: ▼€2,790,000

Total: ▼€6,490,000

==== Income ====
Summer: ▲€13,450,000

Winter: ▲€1,600,000

Total: ▲€15,050,000

== Statistics ==
=== Goalscorers ===
Last updated on 13 May 2017 (UTC)

| Player | Liga I | Cupa României | Cupa Ligii | Champions League | Europa League | Total |
|---|---|---|---|---|---|---|
| (Romania) Denis Alibec | 8 | 0 | 1 | 0 | 0 | 9 |
| (Brazil) Fernando Boldrin | 8 | 0 | 0 | 0 | 0 | 8 |
| (France) Harlem Gnohéré | 5 | 0 | 0 | 0 | 0 | 5 |
| (Romania) Florin Tănase | 4 | 0 | 0 | 0 | 0 | 4 |
| (Romania) Nicolae Stanciu | 1 | 0 | 0 | 3 | 0 | 4 |
| (Romania) Adrian Popa | 3 | 0 | 0 | 0 | 0 | 3 |
| (Romania) Gabriel Enache | 3 | 0 | 0 | 0 | 0 | 3 |
| (Romania) Mihai Pintilii | 3 | 0 | 0 | 0 | 0 | 3 |
| (Serbia) Marko Momčilović | 2 | 0 | 0 | 0 | 1 | 3 |
| (Romania) Ovidiu Popescu | 1 | 1 | 1 | 0 | 0 | 3 |
| (Romania) Vlad Achim | 1 | 1 | 0 | 0 | 1 | 3 |
| (Brazil) William De Amorim | 2 | 0 | 0 | 0 | 0 | 2 |
| (Romania) Alexandru Tudorie | 1 | 0 | 1 | 0 | 0 | 2 |
| (Romania) Gabriel Tamaș | 1 | 0 | 0 | 0 | 1 | 2 |
| (Croatia) Adnan Aganović | 0 | 1 | 1 | 0 | 0 | 2 |
| (Algeria) Jugurtha Hamroun | 1 | 0 | 0 | 0 | 0 | 1 |
| (Romania) Robert Vâlceanu | 1 | 0 | 0 | 0 | 0 | 1 |
| (Democratic Republic of the Congo) Wilfred Moke | 1 | 0 | 0 | 0 | 0 | 1 |
| (Romania) Dennis Man | 1 | 0 | 0 | 0 | 0 | 1 |
| (Romania) Marian Pleașcă | 1 | 0 | 0 | 0 | 0 | 1 |
| (Croatia) Antonio Jakoliš | 1 | 0 | 0 | 0 | 0 | 1 |
| (Ghana) Muniru Sulley | 0 | 0 | 0 | 0 | 1 | 1 |
| (Bosnia and Herzegovina) Bojan Golubović | 0 | 0 | 0 | 0 | 1 | 1 |

== Competitions ==
=== Liga I ===
==== Regular season ====
| Overall | | | | | | | | Home | | | | | | Away | | | | | |
| Pld | W | D | L | GF | GA | GD | Pts | W | D | L | GF | GA | GD | W | D | L | GF | GA | GD |
|---|---|---|---|---|---|---|---|---|---|---|---|---|---|---|---|---|---|---|---|
| 26 | 13 | 8 | 5 | 34 | 22 | +12 | 47 | 6 | 5 | 2 | 16 | 10 | +6 | 7 | 3 | 3 | 18 | 12 | +6 |

Source: FCSB

===== Table =====
| Pos | Team | Pld | W | D | L | GF | GA | GD | Pts | Qualification |
|---|---|---|---|---|---|---|---|---|---|---|
| 1 | Viitorul Constanța | 26 | 16 | 3 | 7 | 39 | 22 | +17 | 51 | Qualification for the Championship round |
| 2 | Steaua București | 26 | 13 | 8 | 5 | 34 | 22 | +12 | 47 | Qualification for the Championship round |
| 3 | Astra Giurgiu | 26 | 13 | 5 | 8 | 32 | 28 | +4 | 44 | Qualification for the Championship round |
| 4 | CFR Cluj (Note: CFR Cluj were deducted six points for failing to comply with licensing requirements.) | 26 | 14 | 7 | 5 | 42 | 23 | +19 | 43 | Qualification for the Championship round |
| 5 | Universitatea Craiova | 26 | 13 | 4 | 9 | 36 | 26 | +10 | 43 | Qualification for the Championship round |

Source: Liga 1, Soccerway
Rules for classification: 1) Points; 2) Head-to-head points; 3) Head-to-head goal difference; 4) Head-to-head goals scored; 5) Goal difference; 6) Goals scored; 7) Play-off.

===== Position by round =====
| Round | 1 | 2 | 3 | 4 | 5 | 6 | 7 | 8 | 9 | 10 | 11 | 12 | 13 | 14 | 15 | 16 | 17 | 18 | 19 | 20 | 21 | 22 | 23 | 24 | 25 | 26 |
|---|---|---|---|---|---|---|---|---|---|---|---|---|---|---|---|---|---|---|---|---|---|---|---|---|---|---|
| Ground | H | A | H | A | H | A | H | A | H | A | H | H | A | A | H | A | H | A | H | A | H | A | H | A | A | H |
| Result | D | W | W | W | D | W | W | W | L | W | W | L | D | W | W | L | D | L | W | L | W | D | D | W | D | D |
| Position | 6 | 4 | 4 | 2 | 2 | 1 | 1 | 1 | 1 | 1 | 1 | 1 | 1 | 1 | 1 | 1 | 1 | 1 | 1 | 3 | 2 | 2 | 2 | 2 | 2 | 2 |

Source: Matches
A = Away; H = Home; W = Win; D = Draw; L = Loss

===== Results =====
| 31 August 2016 Round 1 | Steaua București | 1–1 | CSM Politehnica Iași | Bucharest |
| 21:00 EET (UTC+02) | Vâlceanu 20' | | Bőle 42' | Stadium: Arena Națională; Attendance: 3,227; Referee: Horaţiu Mircea Feșnic; Assistant referees: Mircea Orbuleţ, Marius Cristian Marchidanu; Fourth official: Florin Andrei |

| 31 July 2016 Round 2 | Viitorul Constanța | 1–3 | Steaua București | Ovidiu |
| 20:30 EET (UTC+02) | Chițu 41' | Report | Tudorie 29'; Popa 61'; Stanciu 89' | Stadium: Viitorul; Attendance: 4,000; Referee: George Cătălin Găman; Assistant referees: Nicoară Marius, Dragoș Mihai Iliescu; Fourth official: Cătălin Popa |

| 6 August 2016 Round 3 | Steaua București | 1–0 | Concordia Chiajna | Bucharest |
| 21:00 EET (UTC+02) | Achim 77' | Report | | Stadium: Arena Națională; Attendance: 2,000; Referee: Alexandru Tudor; Assistant referees: Ovidiu Artene, Vladimir Urzică; Fourth official: Claudiu Cornel Marcu |

| 12 August 2016 Round 4 | Botoșani | 0–2 | Steaua București | Botoșani |
| 20:30 EET (UTC+02) | | | Hamroun 50'; Fl. Tănase 80' | Stadium: Municipal; Attendance: 7,500; Referee: Cristian Balaj; Assistant referees: Alexandru Cerei, Ciprian Florin Danșa; Fourth official: Robert George Dumitru |

| 20 August 2016 Round 5 | Steaua București | 1–1 | Dinamo București | Bucharest |
| 21:00 EET (UTC+02) | William 17' | | Rotariu 11' | Stadium: Arena Națională; Attendance: 27,027; Referee: Radu Petrescu; Assistant referees: Vasile Marinescu, Radu Ghinguleac; Fourth official: Marcel Bîrsan |

| 27 August 2016 Round 6 | Pandurii Târgu Jiu | 0–1 | Steaua București | Drobeta-Turnu Severin |
| 21:00 EET (UTC+02) | | | Boldrin 68' | Stadium: Municipal; Attendance: 5,565; Referee: Ovidiu Hațegan; Assistant referees: Octavian Șovre, Valentin Avram; Fourth official: Adrian Cojocaru |

| 11 September 2016 Round 7 | Steaua București | 1–0 | Astra Giurgiu | Bucharest |
| 20:30 EET (UTC+02) | Boldrin 45' | | | Stadium: Arena Națională; Attendance: 7,327; Referee: Marius Avram; Assistant referees: Vasile Marinescu, Mircea Orbuleț; Fourth official: Iulian Călin |

| 18 September 2016 Round 8 | Poli Timișoara | 0–1 | Steaua București | Timișoara |
| 20:30 EET (UTC+02) | | | Fl. Tănase 8' | Stadium: Dan Păltinișanu; Attendance: 12,500; Referee: Sebastian Colțescu; Assistant referees: Daniel Mitruți, Marius Nicoară; Fourth official: Florin Marcu |

| 22 September 2016 Round 9 | Steaua București | 1–2 | CFR Cluj | Bucharest |
| 21:00 EET (UTC+02) | Fl. Tănase 20' | | Bud 12', 63' | Stadium: Arena Națională; Attendance: 3,063; Referee: Cristian Balaj; Assistant referees: Ovidiu Artene, Aurel Oniță; Fourth official: Florin Miron |

| 25 September 2016 Round 10 | Voluntari | 2–3 | Steaua București | Ploiești |
| 20:30 EET (UTC+02) | Ivanovici 25'; Bălan 59' | | Popa 28'; Boldrin 51' (pen.); Momčilović 85' | Stadium: Ilie Oană; Attendance: 936; Referee: Ovidiu Hațegan; Assistant referees: Octavian Şovre, Imre-Laszlo Bucsi; Fourth official: Andrei Florin Chivulete |

| 2 October 2016 Round 11 | Steaua București | 2–1 | Universitatea Craiova | Bucharest |
| 20:30 EET (UTC+02) | William 17'; Boldrin 75' (pen.) | | Vătăjelu 41' | Stadium: Arena Națională; Attendance: 13,000; Referee: Radu Petrescu; Assistant referees: Adrian Radu Ghinguleac, Mircea Mihail Grigoriu; Fourth official: Marian Balaci |

| 16 October 2016 Round 12 | Steaua București | 0–1 | Gaz Metan Mediaș | Bucharest |
| 20:30 EET (UTC+02) | | | Munteanu 26' | Stadium: Arena Națională; Attendance: 1,800; Referee: Florin Marcu; Assistant referees: Iulian Radu, Ionuț Bobe; Fourth official: Adrian Comănescu |

| 23 October 2016 Round 13 | ASA Târgu Mureș | 1–1 | Steaua București | Târgu Mureș |
| 20:30 EET (UTC+02) | Kuku 74' | | Moke 90' | Stadium: Trans-Sil; Attendance: 4,500; Referee: Horațiu Feșnic; Assistant referees: Ciprian Florin Danșa, Marius Nicoară; Fourth official: Denis Haidiner |

| 30 October 2016 Round 14 | CSM Politehnica Iași | 0–2 | Steaua București | Iași |
| 20:30 EET (UTC+02) | | | Tamaș 35'; Man 86' | Stadium: Emil Alexandrescu; Attendance: 5,500; Referee: Alexandru Tudor; Assistant referees: Mircea Orbuleț, Andrei Constantinescu; Fourth official: George Rădulescu |

| 6 November 2016 Round 15 | Steaua București | 2–0 | Viitorul Constanța | Bucharest |
| 20:30 EET (UTC+02) | Boldrin 17' (pen.); Momčilović 22' | | | Stadium: Arena Națională; Attendance: 4,000; Referee: George Găman; Assistant referees: Ovidiu Artene, Miclos Nagy; Fourth official: Iulian Dima |

| 19 November 2016 Round 16 | Concordia Chiajna | 1–0 | Steaua București | Chiajna |
| 19:00 EET (UTC+02) | Neluț Roșu 23' | | | Stadium: Concordia; Attendance: 3,000; Referee: Adrian Cojocaru; Assistant referees: Vasile Marinescu, Marius Marchidanu; Fourth official: George Rădulescu |

| 27 November 2016 Round 17 | Steaua București | 0–0 | Botoșani | Bucharest |
| 20:30 EET (UTC+02) | | | | Stadium: Arena Națională; Attendance: 2,500; Referee: Adrian Comănescu; Assistant referees: Valentin Avram, Ciprian Danșa; Fourth official: Marian Balaci |

| 30 November 2016 Round 18 | Dinamo București | 3–1 | Steaua București | Bucharest |
| 20:30 EET (UTC+02) | Hanca 37' (pen.); Nedelcearu 45+5'; Nemec 58' | | Boldrin 4' (pen.) | Stadium: Arena Națională; Attendance: 22,785; Referee: Ovidiu Hațegan; Assistant referees: Octavian Șovre, Sebastian Gheorghe; Fourth official: Robert Dumitru |

| 4 December 2016 Round 19 | Steaua București | 3–1 | Pandurii Târgu Jiu | Bucharest |
| 20:30 EET (UTC+02) | Enache 20', 54' (pen.); Pintilii 51' | | Herea 33' | Stadium: Arena Națională; Attendance: 1,000; Referee: Cristian Balaj; Assistant referees: Mircea Orbuleț, Marius Nicoară; Fourth official: Marcel Bîrsan |

| 11 December 2016 Round 20 | Astra Giurgiu | 1–0 | Steaua București | Giurgiu |
| 19:00 EET (UTC+02) | Budescu 90+3' | | | Stadium: Marin Anastasovici; Attendance: 2,500; Referee: Radu Petrescu; Assistant referees: Vasile Marinescu, Ovidiu Artene; Fourth official: Ionuț Coza |

| 17 December 2016 Round 21 | Steaua București | 1–0 | Poli Timișoara | Bucharest |
| 20:30 EET (UTC+02) | Popa 33' | | | Stadium: Arena Națională; Attendance: 550; Referee: Marcel Bîrsan; Assistant referees: Vladimir Urzică, Marius Cristian Marchidanu; Fourth official: Adrian Viorel Cojocaru |

| 5 February 2017 Round 22 | CFR Cluj | 1–1 | Steaua București | Cluj-Napoca |
| 20:00 EET (UTC+02) | Deac 58' | | Alibec 16' | Stadium: Dr. Constantin Rădulescu; Attendance: 14,500; Referee: Adrian Viorel Cojocaru; Assistant referees: Mircea Orbuleț, Daniel Mitruți; Fourth official: Ionuț Coza |

| 12 February 2017 Round 23 | Steaua București | 2–2 | Voluntari | Bucharest |
| 20:30 EET (UTC+02) | Boldrin 31'; Gnohéré 87' (pen.) | | Ivanovici 3'; Cernat 81' (pen.) | Stadium: Arena Națională; Attendance: 1,500; Referee: Andrei Florin Chivulete; Assistant referees: Vladimir Urzică, Mircea Mihail Grigoriu; Fourth official: Horia Gabriel Mladinovici |

| 18 February 2017 Round 24 | Universitatea Craiova | 1–2 | Steaua București | Craiova |
| 20:00 EET (UTC+02) | Zlatinski 34' (pen.) | | Pintilii 24'; Enache 79' | Stadium: Extensiv; Attendance: 13,500; Referee: Ovidiu Hațegan; Assistant referees: Octavian Șovre, Sebastian Gheorghe; Fourth official: Florin Andrei |

| 26 February 2017 Round 25 | Gaz Metan Mediaș | 1–1 | Steaua București | Mediaș |
| 20:30 EET (UTC+02) | Sikorski 54' | | Alibec 30' | Stadium: Municipal Gaz Metan; Attendance: 6,500; Referee: George Cătălin Găman; Assistant referees: Vasile Marinescu, Marius Cristian Marchidanu; Fourth official: Iulian Călin |

| 4 March 2017 Round 26 | Steaua București | 1–1 | ASA Târgu Mureș | Bucharest |
| 20:30 EET (UTC+02) | Gnohéré 73' | | Constantin 65' (pen.) | Stadium: Arena Națională; Attendance: 3,000; Referee: Iulian Călin; Assistant referees: Valentin Avram, Daniel Mitruți; Fourth official: Daniel Mitruți |

==== Championship round ====
| Overall | | | | | | | | Home | | | | | | Away | | | | | |
| Pld | W | D | L | GF | GA | GD | Pts | W | D | L | GF | GA | GD | W | D | L | GF | GA | GD |
|---|---|---|---|---|---|---|---|---|---|---|---|---|---|---|---|---|---|---|---|
| 10 | 6 | 2 | 2 | 15 | 7 | +8 | 20 | 4 | 1 | 0 | 11 | 2 | +9 | 2 | 1 | 2 | 4 | 5 | −1 |

Source: FCSB

===== Table =====
| Pos | Team | Pld | W | D | L | GF | GA | GD | Pts | Qualification |
|---|---|---|---|---|---|---|---|---|---|---|
| 1 | Viitorul Constanța (C) | 10 | 5 | 3 | 2 | 12 | 8 | +4 | 44 | Qualification for the Champions League third qualifying round |
| 2 | FCSB | 10 | 6 | 2 | 2 | 15 | 7 | +8 | 44 | Qualification for the Champions League third qualifying round |
| 3 | Dinamo București | 10 | 5 | 4 | 1 | 15 | 8 | +7 | 40 | Qualification for the Europa League third qualifying round |
| 4 | CFR Cluj (Note: CFR Cluj failed to obtain a UEFA licence after filing for insolvency in 2015.) | 10 | 3 | 2 | 5 | 8 | 14 | −6 | 33 | |
| 5 | Universitatea Craiova | 10 | 2 | 3 | 5 | 8 | 14 | −6 | 31 | Qualification for the Europa League third qualifying round (Note: Since the winners of 2016–17 Cupa României, Voluntari, failed to obtain a UEFA licence, the spot awarded to the cup winner (Europa League third qualifying round) was passed to the next best-placed team with a UEFA licence (in this case to the fifth-placed team) and the spot awarded to the fifth-placed team (Europa League second qualifying round) was passed down to the sixth-placed team.) |
| 6 | Astra Giurgiu | 10 | 1 | 2 | 7 | 10 | 17 | −7 | 27 | Qualification for the Europa League second qualifying round |

Source: Soccerway, Romanian Football Federation
Rules for classification: 1) Points; 2) Head-to-head points; 3) Head-to-head goal difference; 4) Head-to-head goals scored; 5) Goal difference; 6) Goals scored; 7) Matches won; 8) Play-off.
(C) Champions

===== Position by round =====
| Round | 1 | 2 | 3 | 4 | 5 | 6 | 7 | 8 | 9 | 10 |
|---|---|---|---|---|---|---|---|---|---|---|
| Ground | H | A | H | H | A | A | H | A | A | H |
| Result | W | L | W | W | W | D | D | L | W | W |
| Position | 1 | 2 | 2 | 1 | 1 | 1 | 1 | 1 | 1 | 2 |

Source: Matches
A = Away; H = Home; W = Win; D = Draw; L = Loss

===== Results =====
| 12 March 2017 Round 1 | Steaua București | 2–0 | CFR Cluj | Bucharest |
| 20:30 EET (UTC+02) | Gnohéré 84'; O. Popescu 90+1' | | | Stadium: Arena Națională; Attendance: 6,500; Referee: Radu Petrescu; Assistant referees: Adrian Radu Ghinguleac, Mircea Mihail Grigoriu; Fourth official: Marius Avram |

| 18 March 2017 Round 2 | Viitorul Constanța | 3–1 | Steaua București | Ovidiu |
| 20:30 EET (UTC+02) | Coman 46'; Morar 56'; Casap 74' | | Alibec 80' | Stadium: Viitorul; Attendance: 4,500; Referee: Ovidiu Hațegan; Assistant referees: Octavian Șovre, Sebastian Gheorghe; Fourth official: Iulian Dima |

| 2 April 2017 Round 3 | Steaua București | 2–1 | Dinamo București | Bucharest |
| 20:30 EET (UTC+02) | Alibec 10'; Boldrin 75' | | Nemec 57' | Stadium: Arena Națională; Attendance: 31,340; Referee: Istvan Kovacs; Assistant referees: Valentin Avram, Alexandru Cerei; Fourth official: Andrei Chivulete |

| 6 April 2017 Round 4 | Steaua București | 3–0 | Astra Giurgiu | Bucharest |
| 20:30 EET (UTC+02) | Alibec 10' (pen.), 26'; Fl. Tănase 32' | | | Stadium: Arena Națională; Attendance: 8,153; Referee: Horațiu Feșnic; Assistant referees: Vladimir Urzică, Ovidiu Artene; Fourth official: Iulian Dima |

| 9 April 2017 Round 5 | Universitatea Craiova | 0–1 | Steaua București | Drobeta-Turnu Severin |
| 20:30 EET (UTC+02) | | | Gnohéré 73' | Stadium: Municipal; Attendance: 14,000; Referee: Marius Avram; Assistant referees: Vasile Marinescu, Miklos Nagy; Fourth official: George Rădulescu |

| 17 April 2017 Round 6 | CFR Cluj | 0–0 | Steaua București | Cluj-Napoca |
| 20:30 EET (UTC+02) | | | | Stadium: Stadionul Dr. Constantin Rădulescu; Attendance: 15,000; Referee: George Găman; Assistant referees: Valentin Avram, Mircea Orbuleț; Fourth official: Robert Dumitru |

| 24 April 2017 Round 7 | Steaua București | 1–1 | Viitorul Constanța | Bucharest |
| 20:30 EET (UTC+02) | Pintilii 40' | | Țucudean 73' | Stadium: Arena Națională; Attendance: 18,027; Referee: Radu Petrescu; Assistant referees: Sebastian Gheorghe, Ciprian Danșa; Fourth official: Sebastian Colțescu |

| 1 May 2017 Round 8 | Dinamo București | 2–1 | Steaua București | Bucharest |
| 20:30 EET (UTC+02) | Hanca 34' (pen.), 90+6' (pen.) | | Pleașcă 53' | Stadium: Arena Națională; Attendance: 37,669; Referee: Ovidiu Hațegan; Assistant referees: Octavian Șovre, Vasile Marinescu; Fourth official: Cătălin Popa |

| 8 May 2017 Round 9 | Astra Giurgiu | 0–1 | Steaua București | Giurgiu |
| 20:30 EET (UTC+02) | | | Gnohéré 12' | Stadium: Marin Anastasovici; Attendance: 2,800; Referee: Alexandru Tudor; Assistant referees: Mircea Orbuleț, Ciprian Danșa; Fourth official: George Rădulescu |

| 13 May 2017 Round 10 | Steaua București | 3–0 | Universitatea Craiova | Bucharest |
| 20:00 EET (UTC+02) | Alibec 18', 42'; Jakoliš 44' | | | Stadium: Arena Națională; Attendance: 35,000; Referee: Horațiu Feșnic; Assistant referees: Ovidiu Artene, Vladimir Urzică; Fourth official: Marcel Bîrsan |

=== Cupa României ===
==== Results ====
| 27 October 2016 Round of 32 | Foresta Suceava | 1–2 | Steaua București | Suceava |
| 21:30 EET (UTC+02) | Matei 18' | | O. Popescu 9'; Aganović 47' | Stadium: Areni; Attendance: 7,000; Referee: Robert Dumitru |

| 14 December 2016 Round of 16 | Mioveni | 1–1 (a.e.t.) (5–4 p) | Steaua București | Mioveni |
| 20:30 EET (UTC+02) | Nilă 95' | | Achim 114' | Stadium: Orășenesc; Attendance: 6,000; Referee: István Kovács; Assistant referees: Alexandru Cerei, Mihai Marius Marica; Fourth official: Eduard Ioniță |
| | Penalties |
| | Năstăsie (penalty missed); Ayza (penalty scored); Stoica (penalty scored); Nilă (penalty scored); Gugu (penalty scored); Boboc (penalty scored) | | (penalty missed) Boldrin; (penalty scored) Achim; (penalty scored) Pintilii; (penalty scored) Popescu; (penalty scored) Moke; (penalty missed) De Amorim |

=== Cupa Ligii ===
==== Results ====
| 8 September 2016 Quarter-finals | Botoșani | 0–2 | Steaua București | Botoșani |
| 20:30 | | | Tudorie 45+2'; O. Popescu 49' | Stadium: Municipal; Referee: Adrian Cojocaru; Assistant referees: Stelian Slabu, Daniel Hulubei; Fourth official: Eduard Ioniţă |

| 22 December 2016 Semi-finals | Dinamo București | 4–1 | Steaua București | Bucharest |
| 20:30 EET (UTC+02) | Mahlangu 19'; Nistor 65'; Lazăr 79'; Rotariu 90' | | Aganovic 78' | Stadium: Arena Națională; Attendance: 9,276; Referee: Horațiu Feșnic; Assistant referees: Valentin Avram, Aurel Onița; Fourth official: Alexandru Tudor |

| 1 March 2017 Semi-finals | Steaua București | 1–3 (2–7 agg.) | Dinamo București | Bucharest |
| 20:00 EET (UTC+02) | Alibec 64' (pen.) | | Nistor 37'; Petre 74'; Hanca 82' (pen.) | Stadium: Arena Națională; Attendance: 18,031; Referee: Alexandru Tudor; Assistant referees: Istvan Nagy, Marius Nicoară; Fourth official: Andrei Chivulete |

=== UEFA Champions League ===
==== Qualifying rounds ====
===== Third qualifying round =====
| 26 July 2016 First leg | Sparta Prague (Czech Republic) | 1–1 | (Romania) Steaua București | Prague, Czech Republic |
| 21:00 EET (UTC+02) | Šural 35' | Report | Stanciu 75' | Stadium: Generali Arena; Referee: Daniel Siebert (Germany); Assistant referees: Jan Seidel, Dominik Schaal; Fourth official: Benjamin Cortus |

| 3 August 2016 Second leg | Steaua București (Romania) | 2–0 (3–1 agg.) | (Czech Republic) Sparta Prague | Bucharest, Romania |
| 20:45 EET (UTC+02) | Stanciu 31', 63' | Report | | Stadium: Arena Națională; Attendance: 37.127; Referee: Danny Makkelie (Netherlands); Assistant referees: Mario Diks, Hessel Steegstra; Fourth official: Kevin Blom |

===== Play-off round =====
| 16 August 2016 First leg | Steaua București (Romania) | 0–5 | (England) Manchester City | Bucharest, Romania |
| 21:45 EET (UTC+02) | | Report | Silva 13'; Agüero 41', 78', 89'; Nolito 49' | Stadium: Arena Națională; Attendance: 45,327; Referee: Daniele Orsato (Italy); Assistant referees: Riccardo Di Fiore, Lorenzo Manganelli; Fourth official: Matteo Passeri; Goal-line assistants: Paolo Mazzoleni, Carmine Russo |

| 24 August 2016 Second leg | Manchester City (England) | 1–0 (6–0 agg.) | (Romania) Steaua București | Manchester, England |
| 21:45 EET (UTC+02) | Delph 56' | Report | | Stadium: City of Manchester Stadium; Attendance: 40,064; Referee: Pawel Gil (Poland); Assistant referees: Piotr Sadczuk, Marcin Borkowski; Fourth official: Konrad Sapela; Goal-line assistants: Bartosz Frankowski, Krzysztof Jakubik |

=== UEFA Europa League ===
==== Group stage ====
| Pos | Team | Pld | W | D | L | GF | GA | GD | Pts | Qualification | OSM | VIL | ZUR | STE |
|---|---|---|---|---|---|---|---|---|---|---|---|---|---|---|
| 1 | (Turkey) Osmanlıspor | 6 | 3 | 1 | 2 | 10 | 7 | +3 | 10 | Advance to knockout phase | — | 2–2 | 2–0 | 2–0 |
| 2 | (Spain) Villarreal | 6 | 2 | 3 | 1 | 9 | 8 | +1 | 9 | Advance to knockout phase | 1–2 | — | 2–1 | 2–1 |
| 3 | (Switzerland) Zürich | 6 | 1 | 3 | 2 | 5 | 7 | −2 | 6 | | 2–1 | 1–1 | — | 0–0 |
| 4 | (Romania) Steaua București | 6 | 1 | 3 | 2 | 5 | 7 | −2 | 6 | | 2–1 | 1–1 | 1–1 | — |

Source: UEFA
Rules for classification: Group stage tiebreakers

===== Results =====
| 15 September 2016 Round 1 | Osmanlıspor (Turkey) | 2–0 | (Romania) Steaua București | Ankara, Turkey |
| 22:05 EET (UTC+02) | Diabaté 64' (pen.); Umar 74' | | | Stadium: Osmanlı Stadyumu; Attendance: 11,807; Referee: Tobias Welz; Assistant referees: Rafael Foltyn, Jan Seidel; Fourth official: Stefan Lupp; Goal-line assistants: Marco Fritz, Robert Hartmann |

| 29 September 2016 Round 2 | Steaua București (Romania) | 1–1 | (Spain) Villarreal | Bucharest, Romania |
| 20:00 EET (UTC+02) | Sulley 20' | | Borré 9' | Stadium: Arena Națională; Attendance: 13,231; Referee: Yevhen Aranovskiy; Assistant referees: Oleksandr Voytyuk, Serhiy Bekker; Fourth official: Semen Shlonchak; Goal-line assistants: Anatoliy Abdula, Anatolii Zhabchenko |

| 20 October 2016 Round 3 | Steaua București (Romania) | 1–1 | (Switzerland) Zürich | Bucharest, Romania |
| 20:00 EET (UTC+02) | Golubović 63' | | Koné 86' | Stadium: Arena Națională; Attendance: 13,154; Referee: Tamás Bognár; Assistant referees: Balazs Buzas, Zsolt Varga; Fourth official: Theodoros Georgiou; Goal-line assistants: Adam Farkas, Peter Solymosi |

| 3 November 2016 Round 4 | Zürich (Switzerland) | 0–0 | (Romania) Steaua București | Zürich, Switzerland |
| 22:05 EET (UTC+02) | | | | Stadium: Letzigrund; Attendance: 8,060; Referee: Robert Schörgenhofer; Assistant referees: Roland Brandner, Roland Riedel; Fourth official: Stefan Kühr |

| 24 November 2016 Round 5 | Steaua București (Romania) | 2–1 | (Turkey) Osmanlıspor | Bucharest, Romania |
| 20:00 EET (UTC+02) | Momčilović 68'; Tamaș 86' | | Ndiaye 30' | Stadium: Arena Națională; Attendance: 6,020; Referee: Paolo Mazzoleni; Assistant referees: Alessandro Giallatini, Filippo Meli; Fourth official: Riccardo Di Fiore |

| 8 December 2016 Round 6 | Villarreal (Spain) | 2–1 | (Romania) Steaua București | Villarreal, Spain |
| 18:00 EET (UTC+02) | Sansone 15'; Trigueros 88' | | Achim 55' | Stadium: Estadio El Madrigal; Attendance: 19,471; Referee: Manuel Gräfe; Assistant referees: Holger Henschel, Mike Pickel; Fourth official: Christian Gittelmann; Goal-line assistants: Robert Hartmann, Marco Fritz |

=== Non competitive matches ===
| Date | Team | Results | | | Steaua scorers |
| Date | Team | Home | Away | Neutral | Steaua scorers |
|---|---|---|---|---|---|
| 14 June 2016 | (Romania) Viitorul Domnești | 1–0 | | | Botă |
| 25 June 2016 | (Slovenia) Turnišče | | | 7–0 | Hamroun 35', Golubović 38', Enceanu 45', Achim 65', Sulley 68', Mihalcea 79' (pen.), Ștefănescu 83' |
| 28 June 2016 | (Croatia) Dinamo Zagreb | | | 0–0 | |
| 6 July 2016 | (Netherlands) NEC | | | 1–0 | Tudorie 79' |
| 8 July 2016 | (Belgium) Charleroi | | | 3–0 | Hamroun 76', Tudorie 87', 90' |
| 10 July 2016 | (Russia) Krylia Sovetov | | | 1–0 | Botă 75' |
| 13 July 2016 | (Greece) PAOK | | | 4–3 | Enache 22', Stanciu 37', Tudorie 39', 45' |
| 23 July 2016 | (Romania) Viitorul Domnești | 5–0 | | | Tudorie, Golubović, Achim |
| 12 November 2016 | (Romania) Mioveni | | 0–1 | | |
| 18 January 2017 | (Azerbaijan) Qarabağ | | | 0–2 | |
| 24 January 2017 | (North Macedonia) Vardar Skopje | | | 1–0 | Jakoliš 61' |
| 26 January 2017 | (Russia) Terek Grozny | | | 1–1 | Enache 56' (pen.) |
| 28 January 2017 | (Slovakia) Slovan Bratislava | | | 1–2 | Alibec 24' |
| 31 January 2017 | (Poland) Wisła Kraków | | | 3–4 | Tamaș 18', Alibec 38', 53' |

== See also ==
- 2016–17 Cupa României
- 2016–17 Cupa Ligii
- 2016–17 Liga I
- 2016–17 UEFA Champions League
- 2016–17 UEFA Europa League
