= 2014–15 Cupa Ligii =

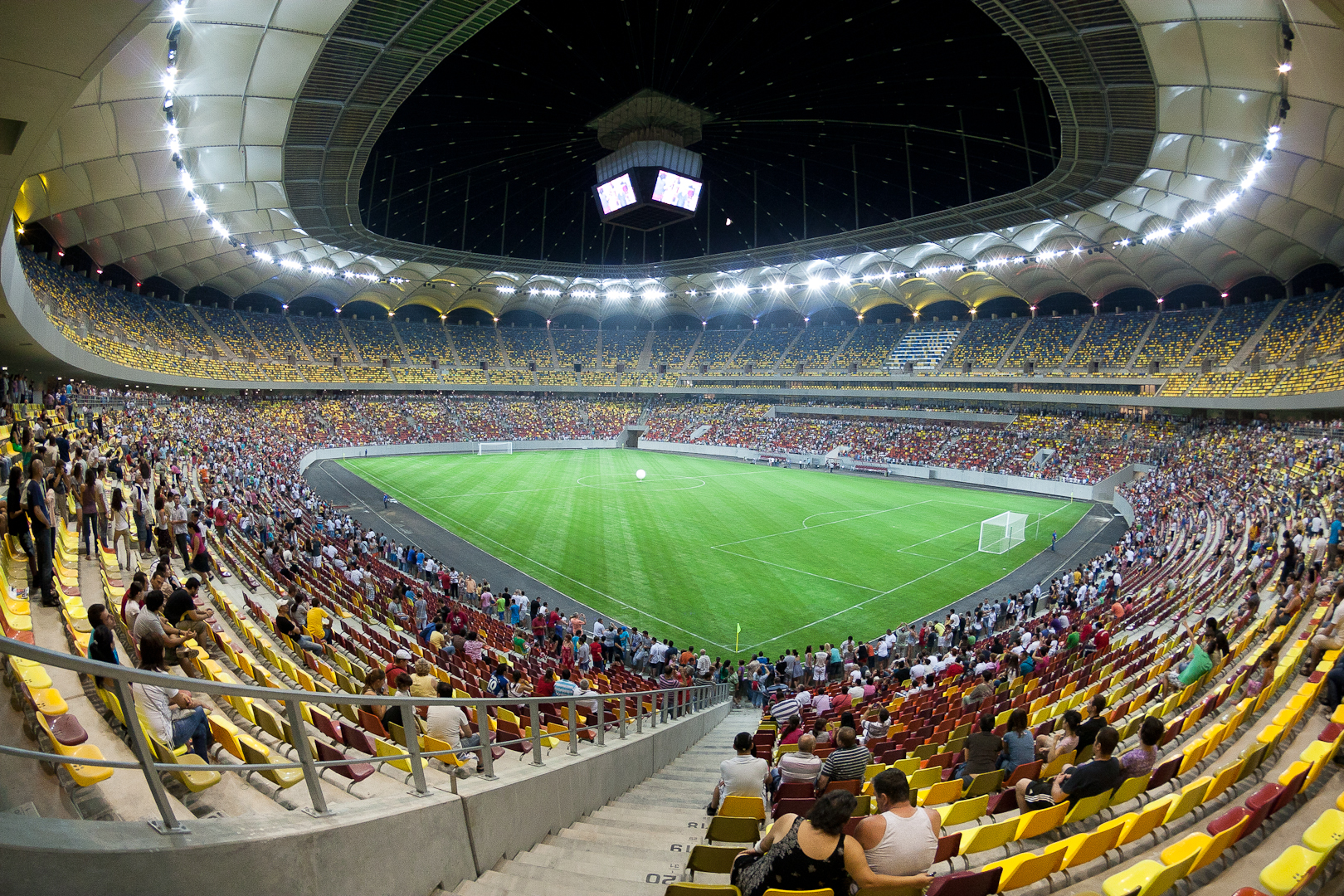
- National Arena in Bucharest will host the final.

Tournament details
- Country: Romania
- Teams: 18

Final positions
- Champions: Steaua București
- Runners-up: Pandurii Târgu Jiu

Tournament statistics
- Matches played: 19
- Goals scored: 53 (2.79 per match)
- Top goal scorer: Kehinde Fatai (3 goals)

The 2014–15 Cupa Ligii was the first official season of the Cupa Ligii. The winner, Steaua București, was not granted a place in the UEFA Europa League, but received €265,000.

All times are CEST (UTC+2).

== Schedule ==
- Play-off round: 16 July 2014
- Round of 16: 18–21 July 2014
- Quarter-finals: 12–14 December 2014
- First leg of semi-finals: 17–18 February 2015
- Second leg of semi-finals: 10–11 March 2015
- Final: 20 May 2015

== Prize money ==
- Winner: 265.000€
- Runner-up: €165.000
- Semi-final: €50.000
- Quarter-final: €25.000
- Round of 16: €20.000
- Play-off round: €10.000

== Play-off round ==
16 July 2014	Rapid București	1–0	Universitatea Craiova	Bucharest
17:00	Ciolacu 52'			Stadium: Stadionul Giulești-Valentin Stănescu; Attendance: 6,000; Referee: Radulescu George (Bucharest)

16 July 2014	Târgu Mureș	0–2	Studențesc Iași	Târgu Mureş
20:00			Crețu 39'; Mihai 86'	Stadium: Stadionul Trans-Sil; Referee: Iulian Dima (Bucharest)

== Round of 16 ==
18 July 2014	Viitorul Constanța	3–3 (a.e.t.) (5–3 p)	Botoșani	Bucharest
17:00	Mitriță 38'; Daminuță 67' (pen.); Patache 95' (o.g.)		Hadnagy 20'; Fülöp 72'; Acsinte 120+1'	Stadium: Stadionul Giulești-Valentin Stănescu; Attendance: 200; Referee: Adrian Ilyes (Ploiești)
	Penalties
	Mitrea (penalty scored); Tănase (penalty scored); Puțanu (penalty scored); Cârstocea (penalty scored); Daminuță (penalty scored)		Ianc (penalty scored); Vașvari (penalty scored); Fülöp (penalty missed); Ivanovici (penalty scored)

18 July 2014	Brașov	1–4	Astra Giurgiu	Brașov
20:00	Buga 48' (pen.)		Fatai 13', 28'; Takayuki 64'; Budescu 67'	Stadium: Stadionul Silviu Ploeșteanu; Attendance: 400; Referee: Sebastian Colțescu (Craiova)

19 July 2014	Oțelul Galați	0–0 (a.e.t.) (3–2 p)	Ceahlăul Piatra Neamț	Galați
17:00				Stadium: Stadionul Oțelul; Attendance: 2,500; Referee: Dragoș Istrate (Bucharest)
	Penalties
	Mișelăricu (penalty scored); Zaharia (penalty scored); Jović (penalty missed); Stoian (penalty scored)		Țepeș (penalty scored); Achim (penalty missed); Chitoșcă (penalty missed); Ștefănescu (penalty scored); Marc (penalty missed)

19 July 2014	Rapid București	1–2	Steaua București	Bucharest
20:00	Selagea 24'		Keșerü 8', 49' (pen.)	Stadium: Stadionul Giulești-Valentin Stănescu; Attendance: 3,000; Referee: Adrian Cojocaru (Galați)

20 July 2014	Studențesc Iași	4–2	CFR Cluj	Iași
17:00	Mihai 5'; Mihalache 13'; Pălimaru 58'; Olah 80' (pen.)		Japonês 38' (pen.); Păun 45'	Stadium: Stadionul Emil Alexandrescu; Attendance: 4,000; Referee: Cătălin Popa (Pitești)

20 July 2014	Universitatea Cluj	1–0	Petrolul Ploiești	Cluj-Napoca
20:00	Kovács 31'			Stadium: Cluj Arena; Attendance: 3,000; Referee: Lucian Rusandu (Covasna)

21 July 2014	Gaz Metan Mediaș	0–1 (a.e.t.)	Pandurii Târgu Jiu	Mediaş
17:00			Christou 94'	Stadium: Stadionul Gaz Metan; Attendance: 1,500; Referee: Florin Miron (Bucharest)

21 July 2014	Concordia Chiajna	1–3	Dinamo București	Chiajna
20:00	Olberdam 19'		Biliński 27'; Lazăr 51'; Boubacar 78' (pen.)	Stadium: Stadionul Concordia; Attendance: 3,000; Referee: Marcel Bârsan (Bucharest)

== Quarter-finals ==
12 December 2014	Pandurii Târgu Jiu	2–0	Oțelul Galați	Târgu Jiu
19:00	Nistor 9'; Buleică 88'			Stadium: Stadionul Tudor Vladimirescu; Attendance: 500; Referee: Marian Balaci (Drobeta Turnu-Severin)

13 December 2014	Dinamo București	0–0 (a.e.t.) (3–2 p)	Universitatea Cluj	Bucharest
19:00				Stadium: Stadionul Dinamo; Referee: Sebastian Colțescu (Craiova)
	Penalties
	Matei (penalty scored); Elton (penalty scored); Nedelcearu (penalty missed); Boubacar (penalty missed); Lazăr (penalty scored)		(penalty scored) Ceppelini; (penalty missed) R. Costin; (penalty missed) Stojanović; (penalty missed) Škvorc; (penalty scored) L. Kovács

14 December 2014	Astra Giurgiu	3–1	Viitorul	Giurgiu
15:30	Alibec 2', 16'; Budescu 9'		Tănase 64'	Stadium: Stadionul Marin Anastasovici; Referee: Cătălin Popa (Pitești)

14 December 2014	Studențesc Iași	0–3	Steaua București	Iași
19:00			Breeveld 13'; Rusescu 29'; Toșca 64'	Stadium: Stadionul Emil Alexandrescu; Attendance: 500; Referee: Robert Dumitru George (Brașov)

== Semi-finals ==
=== 1st leg ===
17 February 2015	Pandurii Târgu Jiu	2–1	Dinamo București	Târgu Jiu
19:00	Roman 6'; Eric 85'		Filip 78'	Stadium: Tudor Vladimirescu; Attendance: 1,500; Referee: Marius Avram (Bucharest)

18 February 2015	Steaua București	3–0	Astra Giurgiu	București
19:00	Tănase 3'; Țucudean 32'; Rusescu 86'			Stadium: Steaua; Attendance: 4,189; Referee: Radu Petrescu (Bucharest)

=== 2nd leg ===
10 March 2015	Dinamo București	1–3 (2–5 agg.)	Pandurii Târgu Jiu	București
18:30	Grozav 84'		Matulevičius 65' (pen.); Pleașcă 71'; Răduț 89'	Stadium: Dinamo; Attendance: 3,000; Referee: George Găman (Craiova)

11 March 2015	Astra Giurgiu	2–0 (2–3 agg.)	Steaua București	Giurgiu
19:00	Fatai 70'; Enache 90+3'			Stadium: Marin Anastasovici; Attendance: 2,000; Referee: Alexandru Tudor (Bucharest)

== Final ==
20 May 2015	Steaua București	3–0	Pandurii Târgu Jiu	Bucharest
20:00	Iancu 3' (pen.); Chipciu 54'; Țucudean 67'	Report		Stadium: National Arena; Attendance: 15,560; Referee: Adrian Comănescu; Assistant referees: Radu Ghinguleac, Mircea Grigoriu; Fourth official: Alexandru Cerei; Goal-line assistants: Marcel Bârsan, Andrei Chivulete
