= Pedro Mingote =

Portuguese footballer

Personal information
- Full name: João Pedro Mingote Ribeiro
- Date of birth: 2 August 1980 (age 46)
- Place of birth: Santa Maria da Feira, Portugal
- Height: 1.84 m (6 ft 0 in)
- Position: Goalkeeper

Team information
- Current team: Al-Fayha (GK coach)

Youth career
- 1992–1993: Rio Meão
- 1993–1995: União Lamas
- 1995–1999: Porto

Senior career*
Years	Team	Apps	(Gls)
1999–2000	União Leiria	0	(0)
2000–2002	Naval	20	(0)
2002–2005	Ovarense	46	(0)
2005–2006	Dragões Sandinenses	26	(0)
2006–2007	Moreirense	26	(0)
2007	Lousada	18	(0)
2008–2016	Pandurii Târgu Jiu	142	(0)
2016	ASA Târgu Mureș	14	(0)
2017	Universitatea Craiova	3	(0)
2017	Juventus București	3	(0)
2020	Internațional Bălești	1	(0)
Total		299	(0)

International career
1996	Portugal U15	1	(0)
1998	Portugal U17	2	(0)
1998–1999	Portugal U18	7	(0)

Managerial career
- 2020–2022: Pandurii Târgu Jiu (GK coach)
- 2022–2024: Al-Jabalain (GK coach)
- 2024: Viitorul Târgu Jiu (GK coach)
- 2024–: Al-Fayha (GK coach)
- * Club domestic league appearances and goals

João Pedro Mingote Ribeiro (born 2 August 1980), known as Mingote, is a Portuguese former professional footballer who played as a goalkeeper, currently goalkeeping coacht at Saudi Pro League club Al-Fayha.

== Club career ==
Born in Santa Maria da Feira, Aveiro District, Mingote's professional input in his homeland consisted of 66 Segunda Liga games over the course of five seasons, with Associação Naval 1º de Maio and A.D. Ovarense. In 2004–05, he played understudy to Sérgio Leite as the latter club finished in 12th position.

During the 2008 January transfer window, Mingote left for Romania – where he would remain the following decade – and signed with CS Pandurii Târgu Jiu from lower league side A.D. Lousada. In the 2012–13 campaign, he contributed with 26 games to help the former team to a best-ever second place in Liga I.

Mingote left the Stadionul Municipal in the summer of 2016, going on to represent ASA 2013 Târgu Mureș and CS Universitatea Craiova.

== Honours ==
Pandurii Târgu Jiu

- Cupa Ligii runner-up: 2014–15
