= Marian Pleașcă =

Romanian footballer (born 1990)

Personal information
- Date of birth: 6 February 1990 (age 36)
- Place of birth: Dăneasa, Romania
- Height: 1.76 m (5 ft 9 in)
- Position: Right back

Team information
- Current team: Pandurii Târgu Jiu
- Number: 13

Youth career
- 2000–2009: Pandurii Târgu Jiu

Senior career*
Years	Team	Apps	(Gls)
2010–2016	Pandurii Târgu Jiu	76	(1)
2010	→ Minerul Lupeni (loan)	4	(0)
2017–2018	FCSB	11	(1)
2018	→ FC Voluntari (loan)	10	(0)
2019–2020	Gaz Metan Mediaș	18	(0)
2020	UTA Arad	2	(0)
2021–2022	Pandurii Târgu Jiu	14	(2)
Total		148	(4)

International career
2011	Romania U-21	3	(0)
2011	Romania	1	(0)
- * Club domestic league appearances and goals as of 08:21, 21 June 2022 (UTC)

Marian Pleașcă (born 6 February 1990) is a Romanian professional footballer who plays as a right back. He is a product of the Pandurii Târgu Jiu youth academy and has played for several clubs in the Romanian top flight, Liga I, as well as making one appearance for the Romania national team.

== Club career ==
=== Pandurii Târgu Jiu ===
Pleașcă spent his youth career at Pandurii Târgu Jiu, and made his senior debut for the club in 2009. His initial spell with the Gorj County side stretched until 2017, interrupted only by a short loan to Liga II side Minerul Lupeni in 2010. During his time at Pandurii, he was part of the squad that finished runners-up in the 2012–13 Liga I season, securing a spot in the UEFA Europa League qualification rounds.

=== FCSB ===
In February 2017, Pleașcă moved to FCSB (then known as Steaua București). He spent a year at the capital club, making 11 Liga I appearances and scoring one goal. He also featured for the club in the Europa League qualification matches. During his tenure at FCSB, he had a loan spell with fellow Liga I team FC Voluntari in the second half of the 2017–18 season.

=== Later career ===
Following his departure from FCSB, Pleașcă joined Gaz Metan Mediaș in January 2019, where he played for one and a half seasons. He then had a brief spell with UTA Arad in 2020 before returning to Pandurii Târgu Jiu for a second senior spell in 2021. As of mid-2022, he was reported to be playing for the amateur club CS Oltețul Alunu.

== International career ==
Marian Pleașcă represented the Romania U-21 side on three occasions in 2011. He earned his only cap for the Romania national team in 2011.

== Honours ==
=== Club ===
Pandurii Târgu Jiu

- Liga I: Runner-up 2013

FCSB

- Liga I: Runner-up 2016–17, 2017–18

== Career statistics ==
As of match played 17 May 2018

Appearances and goals by club, season and competition
Club	Season	League			Cupa României		Cupa Ligii		Europe		Other		Total	
Club	Season	Division	Apps	Goals	Apps	Goals	Apps	Goals	Apps	Goals	Apps	Goals	Apps	Goals
Pandurii Târgu Jiu	2009–10	Liga I	2	0	—		—		—		—		2	0
Pandurii Târgu Jiu	2010–11	Liga I	11	0	0	0	—		—		—		11	0
Pandurii Târgu Jiu	2011–12	Liga I	7	0	2	0	—		—		—		9	0
Pandurii Târgu Jiu	2012–13	Liga I	13	0	3	0	—		—		—		16	0
Pandurii Târgu Jiu	2013–14	Liga I	12	0	3	0	—		2 (Note: Appearances in UEFA Europa League)	0	—		17	0
Pandurii Târgu Jiu	2014–15	Liga I	16	0	0	0	3	1	—		—		19	1
Pandurii Târgu Jiu	2015–16	Liga I	2	0	0	0	0	0	—		—		2	0
Pandurii Târgu Jiu	2016–17	Liga I	13	1	1	0	1	0	2	1	—		17	2
Pandurii Târgu Jiu	Total		76	1	9	0	4	1	4	1	—		93	3
Minerul Lupeni (loan)	2010–11	Liga II	4	0	0	0	—		—		—		4	0
Pandurii II Târgu Jiu	2012–13	Liga III	—		1	0	—		—		—		1	0
FCSB	2016–17	Liga I	7	1	—		0	0	—		—		7	1
FCSB	2017–18	Liga I	4	0	2	0	—		0	0	—		6	0
FCSB	2018–19	Liga I	0	0	0	0	—		0	0	—		0	0
FCSB	Total		11	1	2	0	0	0	0	0	—		13	1
FCSB II	2016–17	Liga III	1	0	—		—		—		—		1	0
FCSB II	2017–18	Liga III	12	0	—		—		—		—		12	0
FCSB II	Total		13	0	—		—		—		—		13	0
Voluntari (loan)	2017–18	Liga I	10	0	—		—		—		—		10	0
Gaz Metan Mediaș	2018–19	Liga I	0	0	0	0	—		—		—		0	0
Career total			114	2	12	0	4	1	4	1	—		134	4
