= Dan Roman (footballer, born 1985) =

Romanian footballer

Personal information
- Full name: Dan Mihai Roman
- Date of birth: 23 December 1985 (age 40)
- Place of birth: Cluj-Napoca, Romania
- Height: 1.88 m (6 ft 2 in)
- Position: Striker

Youth career
- 1995–2003: Universitatea Cluj
- 2003–2006: CFR Cluj

Senior career*
Years	Team	Apps	(Gls)
2003–2006	CFR Cluj	1	(0)
2006	Lacul Ursu Mobila Sovata	15	(11)
2007–2009	Gloria Bistrița	14	(0)
2007–2008	→ Forex Brașov (loan)	31	(7)
2009	CSM Râmnicu Vâlcea	15	(6)
2010–2011	FCM Târgu Mureș	26	(7)
2011–2015	Gaz Metan Mediaș	84	(17)
2015–2016	Botoșani	22	(3)
2016	CSMS Iași	4	(0)
2016–2017	CFR Cluj	8	(0)
2017	UTA Arad	4	(0)
2017	Hermannstadt	6	(0)
2018–2021	Sănătatea Cluj	47	(17)
2021–2022	Viitorul Cluj		
2022–2023	CS Ocna Mureș		
Total		277	(68)

Managerial career
- 2021–2022: Viitorul Cluj (player/youth coach)
- 2022–2023: CS Ocna Mureș (player/coach)
- 2023: Unirea Dej (assistant)
- 2024–: CFR Cluj U-17
- * Club domestic league appearances and goals

Dan Mihai Roman (born 23 December 1985) is a former Romanian footballer who played as a striker.

== Honours ==
CFR Cluj

- Divizia B: 2003–04

FCM Târgu Mureș

- Liga II: 2009–10
