= Florentin Pham =

Romanian professional footballer (born 1997)

Personal information
- Full name: Florentin Phạm Huy Tiến
- Date of birth: 2 March 1997 (age 29)
- Place of birth: Brăila, Romania
- Height: 1.71 m (5 ft 7 1/2 in)
- Position: Defender

Youth career
- 2006–2014: Juventus București

Senior career*
Years	Team	Apps	(Gls)
2014–2019	FCSB	0	(0)
2015–2016	→ Academica Clinceni (loan)	13	(1)
2016–2019	FCSB II	20	(0)
2018–2019	→ Metaloglobus București (loan)	4	(0)
Total		37	(1)

International career
2013–2014	Romania U17	4	(0)
2015–2016	Romania U19	3	(0)
- * Club domestic league appearances and goals

Florentin Phạm Huy Tiến (born 2 March 1997) is a Romanian former professional footballer who played as a right-back.

== Personal life ==
Florentin was born to a Vietnamese father and a Romanian mother.

== Statistics ==
Club	Season	League		Cup		League Cup		Europe		Other		Total	
Club	Season	Apps	Goals	Apps	Goals	Apps	Goals	Apps	Goals	Apps	Goals	Apps	Goals
Steaua București	2014–15	0	0	0	0	2	0	0	0	0	0	2	0
Total		0	0	0	0	2	0	0	0	0	0	2	0
Clinceni	2015–16	13	1	0	0	–		–		–		13	1
Total		13	1	0	0	–	–	–	–	–	–	13	1
FCSB II	2016–17	8	0	0	0	–		–		–		8	0
FCSB II	2017–18	12	0	–		–		–		–		12	0
Total		20	0	–	–	–	–	–	–	–	–	20	0
Metaloglobus București	2018–19	4	0	0	0	–		–		–		4	0
Total		4	0	0	0	–	–	–	–	–	–	4	0
Career Total		37	1	0	0	2	0		0	0	0	39	1

Statistics accurate as of match played 22 January 2022

== Honours ==
=== Club ===
- FCSB:
  - Romanian Liga I: 2014–15
  - Romanian Cup: 2014–15
  - Romanian League Cup: 2014–15

== See also ==
- List of Vietnam footballers born outside Vietnam
