= Sergiu Muth =

Romanian footballer (born 1990)

Personal information
- Full name: Horațiu Sergiu Muth
- Date of birth: 24 July 1990 (age 36)
- Place of birth: Târnăveni, Romania
- Height: 1.87 m (6 ft 2 in)
- Position: Centre-back

Youth career
- 2000–2006: Chimica Târnăveni
- 2006–2007: Gaz Metan Mediaș

Senior career*
| Years | Team | Apps | (Gls) |
| 2007–2016 | Gaz Metan Mediaș | 91 | (1) |
| 2009–2010 | Gaz Metan Mediaș II | 29 | (1) |
| 2008 | → Prefab 05 Modelu (loan) | 5 | (0) |
| 2009 | → UTA Arad (loan) | 0 | (0) |
| 2011 | → CSMS Iași (loan) | 10 | (1) |
| 2016 | Târgu Mureș | 2 | (0) |
| 2016 | Gaz Metan Mediaș | 0 | (0) |
| Total | | 137 | (3) |

International career
| | Romania U-17 | 1 | (0) |
| | Romania U-19 | 4 | (0) |
| 2011–2012 | Romania U-21 | 6 | (0) |
- * Club domestic league appearances and goals as of 13 January 2016

Sergiu Muth (born 24 July 1990) is a Romanian former footballer. He decided to retire from football at age 26.
