= Adnan Aganović =

Croatian footballer (born 1987)

Personal information
- Date of birth: 3 October 1987 (age 39)
- Place of birth: Dubrovnik, SR Croatia, SFR Yugoslavia
- Height: 1.81 m (5 ft 11 1/2 in)
- Position: Midfielder

Team information
- Current team: Sepsi OSK
- Number: 77

Youth career
- –2003: Dubrovnik

Senior career*
Years	Team	Apps	(Gls)
2003–2004	Dubrovnik 1919	15	(3)
2004–2006	GOŠK Dubrovnik	46	(6)
2006–2009	Trogir	84	(12)
2009–2010	Međimurje	22	(0)
2010–2011	Varaždin	24	(1)
2011–2012	Koper	25	(6)
2012–2013	Istra	18	(3)
2013–2015	FC Brașov	60	(5)
2015	Viitorul Constanța	23	(7)
2016	AEL Limassol	15	(4)
2016–2017	Steaua București	9	(0)
2017–2018	AEL	31	(2)
2018–2019	Altay	17	(1)
2019–2020	AEL Limassol	28	(3)
2020–2024	Sepsi OSK	130	(12)
2024–2025	Unirea Slobozia	39	(3)
2025–	Sepsi OSK	15	(0)
- * Club domestic league appearances and goals as of 12 May 2026

Adnan Aganović (born 3 October 1987) is a Croatian professional footballer who plays as a midfielder for Liga I club Sepsi OSK.

== Club career ==
Born in Dubrovnik, Aganović started his professional career with Croatian teams Dubrovnik 1919, GOŠK Dubrovnik, Trogir, playing in the lower Croatian football leagues. In Croatian first league he played for Međimurje and Varaždin. While with Varaždin, he played in the Europa League 2011/2012 qualifications, scoring and assisting against Dinamo București in third qualifications round. After Varaždin, he played for Slovenian side Koper, where he became one of the best attacking midfielders in that part of Europe. In the next season he returned to Croatian first league side Istra 1961 in which he continued his progress. In the 2013/2014 season, he signed for Romanian side Brasov. After two years in Brasov, on the start of season 2015/2016. he signed for the ambitious Romanian side Viitorul Constanţa, where he should be one of the most important players. On winter break of season 2015/2016., after he was one of the best Viitorul players, he moved to Cypriot top side AEL Limassol. In the summer of 2016., he signed for Romanian giants Steaua București, and with them he had the opportunity to play in Champions League playoffs against Manchester City. After spending half a season to Steaua București, on winter break of season 2016/2017, he moved to Greek side AEL.

== Career statistics ==
As of match played 1 September 2026

Appearances and goals by club, season and competition
Club	Season	League			National cup (Note: Includes Croatian Cup, Slovenian Cup, Cupa României, Cypriot Cup, Greek Cup, Turkish Cup)		League cup (Note: Includes Cupa Ligii)		Europe		Other		Total	
Club	Season	Division	Apps	Goals	Apps	Goals	Apps	Goals	Apps	Goals	Apps	Goals	Apps	Goals
Dubrovnik 1919	2003–04	3. HNL	15	3	?	?	—		—		—		15	3
GOŠK Dubrovnik	2004–05	2. HNL	?	?	?	?	—		—		—		?	?
GOŠK Dubrovnik	2005–06	3. HNL	?	?	?	?	—		—		—		?	?
GOŠK Dubrovnik	Total		46	6	?	?	—		—		—		46	6
Trogir	2006–07	3. HNL	29	5	?	?	—		—		—		29	5
Trogir	2007–08	2. HNL	27	2	?	?	—		—		—		27	2
Trogir	2008–09	2. HNL	28	5	?	?	—		—		—		28	5
Trogir	Total		84	12	?	?	—		—		—		84	12
Međimurje	2009–10	1. HNL	22	0	0	0	—		—		—		22	0
Varaždin	2010–11	1. HNL	21	1	5	1	—		—		—		26	2
Varaždin	2011–12	1. HNL	3	0	0	0	—		6 (Note: Appearances in UEFA Europa League)	0	—		9	0
Varaždin	Total		24	1	5	1	—		6	0	—		35	2
Koper	2011–12	1. SNL	25	6	3	0	—		—		—		28	6
Istra 1961	2012–13	1. HNL	18	3	1	0	—		—		—		19	3
FC Brașov	2013–14	Liga I	27	1	2	1	—		—		—		29	2
FC Brașov	2014–15	Liga I	33	4	1	0	1	0	—		—		35	4
FC Brașov	Total		60	5	3	1	1	0	—		—		64	6
Viitorul Constanța	2015–16	Liga I	23	7	3	0	2	0	—		—		28	7
AEL Limassol	2015–16	Cypriot First Division	15	4	2	0	—		—		—		17	4
Steaua București	2015–16	Liga I	0	0	0	0	1	0	—		—		1	0
Steaua București	2016–17	Liga I	9	0	1	1	2	1	5 (Note: Three appearances in UEFA Champions League, two appearances in UEFA Europa League)	0	—		17	2
Steaua București	Total		9	0	1	1	3	1	5	0	—		18	2
AEL	2016–17	Super League Greece	8	1	0	0	—		—		—		8	1
AEL	2017–18	Super League Greece	23	1	5	0	—		—		—		28	1
AEL	Total		31	2	5	0	—		—		—		36	2
Altay	2018–19	TFF 1. Lig	17	1	2	1	—		—		—		19	2
AEL Limassol	2018–19	Cypriot First Division	12	0	4	4	—		—		—		16	4
AEL Limassol	2019–20	Cypriot First Division	16	3	2	0	—		2	0	1 (Note: Appearances in Cypriot Super Cup)	0	21	3
AEL Limassol	Total		28	3	6	4	—		2	0	1	0	37	7
Sepsi OSK	2020–21	Liga I	33	3	1	0	—		—		1 (Note: Appearance in Liga I play-offs for UEFA Europa Conference League)	1	35	4
Sepsi OSK	2021–22	Liga I	30	4	6	0	—		2 (Note: Appearances in UEFA Europa Conference League)	0	—		38	4
Sepsi OSK	2022–23	Liga I	33	2	5	0	—		3	0	1 (Note: Appearance in Supercupa României)	0	41	2
Sepsi OSK	2023–24	Liga I	34	3	1	0	—		6	1	1	0	42	4
Sepsi OSK	Total		130	12	13	0	—		11	1	3	1	157	14
Unirea Slobozia	2024–25	Liga I	33	1	0	0	—		—		1 (Note: Appearance in Liga I promotion/relegation play-offs)	0	34	1
Unirea Slobozia	2025–26	Liga I	6	2	0	0	—		—		—		6	2
Unirea Slobozia	Total		39	3	0	0	—		—		1	0	40	3
Sepsi OSK	2025–26	Liga II	15	0	2	0	—		—		—		17	0
Sepsi OSK	2026–27	Liga I	0	0	1	0	—		—		—		1	0
Sepsi OSK	Total		15	0	3	0	—		—		—		18	0
Career Total			601	68	47	8	6	1	24	1	5	1	683	79

== Honours ==
=== Club ===
GOŠK Dubrovnik

- Treća HNL – South: 2005–06

Trogir

- Treća HNL – South: 2006–07

Varaždin

- Croatian Cup runner-up: 2010–11

Steaua București

- Cupa Ligii: 2015–16

AEL Limassol

- Cypriot Cup: 2018–19
- Cypriot Super Cup runner-up: 2019

Sepsi OSK

- Cupa României: 2021–22, 2022–23
- Supercupa României: 2022, 2023
