= Robert Vâlceanu =

Romanian footballer (born 1997)

Personal information
- Full name: Robert Alexandru Vâlceanu
- Date of birth: 29 March 1997 (age 29)
- Place of birth: Bucharest, Romania
- Height: 1.66 m (5 ft 5 1/2 in)
- Positions: Attacking midfielder; winger

Youth career
- 2002–2014: Steaua București

Senior career*
Years	Team	Apps	(Gls)
2014–2017	FCSB	10	(2)
2015–2016	→ Voluntari (loan)	12	(1)
2017	→ UTA Arad (loan)	11	(1)
2017–2018	Astra Giurgiu	1	(0)
2019–2020	Metaloglobus București	23	(2)
2020–2021	Dacia Unirea Brăila	18	(4)
Total		75	(10)

International career^{‡}
2013–2014	Romania U17	3	(0)
- * Club domestic league appearances and goals as of 30 April 2021 ‡ National team caps and goals as of 23 October 2013

Robert Alexandru Vâlceanu (born 29 March 1997) is a former Romanian professional footballer who plays as an attacking midfielder or a winger.

== Club career ==
=== Steaua București ===
Vâlceanu scored a free kick goal on his Liga I debut on 15 March 2014, in the 3–0 home victory over Gaz Metan Mediaș.

=== Astra Giurgiu ===
On 30 May 2017, Vâlceanu was loaned out to Astra Giurgiu for the following two seasons. However, five days later the player announced that it would actually be a full transfer.

== Career statistics ==
=== Club ===
As of 15 June 2017

Club statistics
Club	Season	League		Cup		League Cup		Europe		Other		Total	
Club	Season	Apps	Goals	Apps	Goals	Apps	Goals	Apps	Goals	Apps	Goals	Apps	Goals
Steaua București	2013–14	4	1	0	0	–		–		–		4	1
Steaua București	2014–15	5	0	2	0	4	0	2	0	0	0	13	0
Steaua București	2016–17	1	1	0	0	0	0	0	0	–		1	1
Total		10	2	2	0	4	0	2	0	0	0	18	2
Voluntari	2015–16	12	1	0	0	1	0	–		–		13	1
Total		12	1	0	0	1	0	–	–	–	–	13	1
UTA Arad	2016–17	11	1	–		–		–		2	0	13	1
Total		11	1	–	–	–	–	–	–	2	0	13	1
Astra Giurgiu	2017–18	1	0	0	0	–		1	0	–		2	0
Total		1	0	0	0	–		1	0	–		2	0
Metaloglobus	2018-19	17	2	0	0	–		–		–		17	2
	2019-20	6	0	0	0	–		–		–		6	0
Total		23	2	0	0	–	–	0	0	–	–	23	2
Career Total		57	6	2	0	5	0	3	0	2	0	69	6

== Honours ==
=== Club ===
Steaua București

- Liga I: 2013–14, 2014–15
- Cupa României: 2014–15
- Cupa Ligii: 2014-15, 2015–16
