= Ovidiu Popescu =

Romanian professional footballer

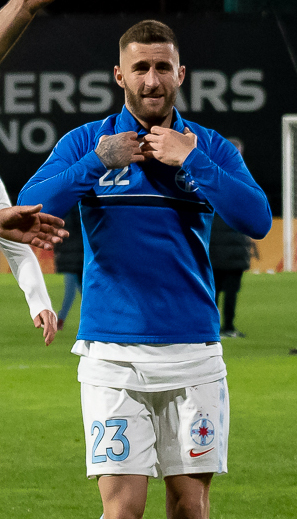
- Popescu with FCSB in 2022

Personal information
- Full name: Ovidiu Marian Popescu
- Date of birth: 27 February 1994 (age 32)
- Place of birth: Reșița, Romania
- Height: 1.81 m (5 ft 11 in)
- Positions: Defensive midfielder; defender

Team information
- Current team: Politehnica Timișoara
- Number: 27

Youth career
- 2004–2009: Muncitorul Reșița
- 2009–2013: Școala de Fotbal Marcel Băban Jimbolia

Senior career*
Years	Team	Apps	(Gls)
2013–2014	UTA Arad	24	(6)
2014–2016	ACS Poli Timișoara	47	(5)
2016–2024	FCSB	200	(4)
2024–2025	Universitatea Cluj	19	(1)
2025–2026	UTA Arad	15	(0)
2026–	Politehnica Timișoara	8	(0)

International career^{‡}
2015–2016	Romania U21	8	(1)
2021	Romania	2	(0)
- * Club domestic league appearances and goals as of 9 November 2026 ‡ National team caps and goals as of 28 March 2021

Ovidiu Marian Popescu (Romanian pronunciation: [oˈvidju mariˈan poˈpesku]; born 27 February 1994) is a Romanian professional footballer who plays as a defensive midfielder or a defender for Liga II club Politehnica Timișoara.

== Club career ==
=== FCSB ===
In June 2016, FCSB transferred Popescu for undisclosed fee, with the player penning a five-year deal with a €10 million buyout clause. He made his debut in the Liga I on 12 August against FC Botoșani, a game Steaua went on to win 2–0. On 8 September, also against Botoșani but in the Cupa Ligii, Popescu scored his first goal for the Roș-albaștrii.

He finally scored his first league goal for the club with a free kick in a 2–0 victory over CFR Cluj on 12 March 2017. During early April, following Popescu's good display, it was reported that Celtic and Southampton were interested in signing him.

== International career ==
In June 2015, Popescu was selected in Romania's squad for the 2017 UEFA European Under-21 Championship qualifier against Armenia.

He made his debut for Romania national football team on 25 March 2021 in a World Cup qualifier against North Macedonia.

== Career statistics ==
=== Club ===
As of match played 9 November 2026

Appearances and goals by club, season and competition
Club	Season	League			Cupa României		Cupa Ligii		Europe		Other		Total	
Club	Season	Division	Apps	Goals	Apps	Goals	Apps	Goals	Apps	Goals	Apps	Goals	Apps	Goals
UTA Arad	2013–14	Liga II	24	6	1	0	—		—		—		25	6
ACS Poli Timișoara	2014–15	Liga II	22	3	0	0	—		—		—		22	3
ACS Poli Timișoara	2015–16	Liga I	25	2	2	0	0	0	—		—		27	2
ACS Poli Timișoara	Total		47	5	2	0	0	0	—		—		49	5
FCSB	2016–17	Liga I	27	1	2	1	3	1	5 (Note: Two appearances in UEFA Champions League, three appearances in UEFA Europa League)	0	—		37	3
FCSB	2017–18	Liga I	24	0	1	0	—		8 (Note: Three appearances in UEFA Champions League, five appearances in UEFA Europa League)	0	—		33	0
FCSB	2018–19	Liga I	10	0	0	0	—		2 (Note: Appearances in UEFA Europa League)	0	—		12	0
FCSB	2019–20	Liga I	27	1	4	0	—		8	0	—		39	1
FCSB	2020–21	Liga I	35	0	1	0	—		1	0	1 (Note: Appearance in Supercupa României)	0	38	0
FCSB	2021–22	Liga I	30	0	1	0	—		2 (Note: Appearances in UEFA Europa Conference League)	0	—		33	0
FCSB	2022–23	Liga I	17	1	0	0	—		3	0	—		20	1
FCSB	2023–24	Liga I	30	1	3	0	—		3	0	—		36	1
FCSB	Total		200	4	12	1	3	1	32	0	1	0	248	6
Universitatea Cluj	2024–25	Liga I	19	1	0	0	—		—		—		19	1
UTA Arad	2025–26	Liga I	15	0	3	0	—		—		—		18	0
Politehnica Timișoara	2026–27	Liga II	8	0	2	0	—		—		—		10	0
Career total			313	16	20	1	3	1	32	0	1	0	369	18

=== International ===
As of match played 28 March 2021

Appearances and goals by national team and year
National team	Year	Apps	Goals
Romania
Romania	2021	2	0
Total		2	0

== Honours ==
ACS Poli Timișoara

- Liga II: 2014–15

FCSB

- Liga I: 2023–24
- Cupa României: 2019–20
- Supercupa României runner-up: 2020
