= Alin Cârstocea =

Romanian footballer

Personal information
- Full name: Alin Ionuț Cârstocea
- Date of birth: 16 January 1992 (age 34)
- Place of birth: Năvodari, Romania
- Height: 1.85 m (6 ft 1 in)
- Position: Centre midfielder

Team information
- Current team: Farul Constanța (team manager)

Youth career
- 2001–2009: Elpis Constanța
- 2009–2010: Gheorghe Hagi Academy

Senior career*
Years	Team	Apps	(Gls)
2010–2016	Viitorul Constanța	102	(16)
2015–2016	→ Voluntari (loan)	11	(1)
2016	ACS Poli Timișoara	16	(1)
2017	Botoșani	7	(0)
2017	UTA Arad	15	(1)
2018	Farul Constanța	12	(3)
2018–2020	Rapid București	38	(11)
2020–2021	Dunărea Călărași	20	(1)
2021–2023	Gloria Buzău	30	(8)
2023–2024	Dunărea Călărași	24	(4)
Total		275	(46)

International career
2011	Romania U19	3	(2)
2012–2014	Romania U21	8	(0)

Managerial career
- 2024–: Farul Constanța (team manager)
- * Club domestic league appearances and goals

Alin Ionuț Cârstocea (born 16 January 1992) is a Romanian former footballer who played as a midfielder, currently the team manager of Liga I club Farul Constanța.

== International career ==
Cârstocea played with the Romania U-19 at the 2011 UEFA European Under-19 Football Championship, which took place in Romania. He made his debut for under-19 team in the same tournament on 20 July 2011 in a game against Czech Republic U-19.

== Honours ==
Viitorul Constanța

- Liga III: 2009–10

Voluntari

- Liga II: 2014–15

Farul Constanța

- Liga III: 2017–18

Rapid București

- Liga III: 2018–19
