= Wilfred Moke =

DR Congolese footballer (born 1988)

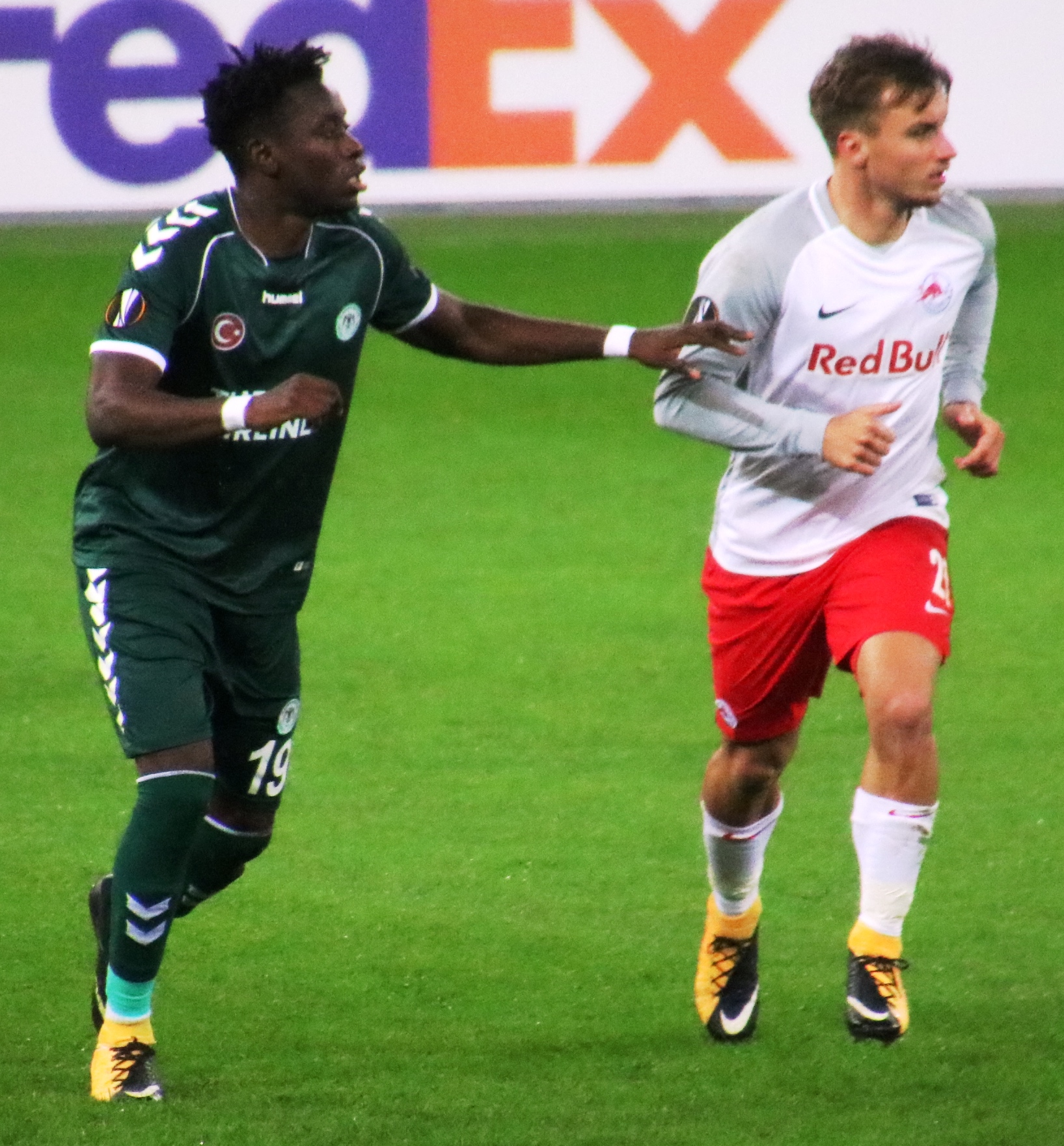

Personal information
- Full name: Wilfred Moke Abro
- Date of birth: 12 February 1988 (age 38)
- Place of birth: Kinshasa, Zaire
- Height: 1.83 m (6 ft 0 in)
- Positions: Defensive midfielder; centre-back

Team information
- Current team: Dinamo II București (mental coach)

Youth career
- –2006: Brétigny
- 2006–2007: Linares

Senior career*
Years	Team	Apps	(Gls)
2007–2008	San Fernando	29	(0)
2008	Puertollano		
2009	Socuéllamos		
2009–2010	Écija	35	(0)
2010–2013	Cádiz	76	(0)
2013–2015	Burgos	65	(1)
2015–2016	Rapid București	15	(0)
2016	Voluntari	21	(0)
2016–2017	FCSB	27	(1)
2017–2019	Konyaspor	27	(1)
2019–2020	Ankaragücü	30	(0)
Total		331	(3)

International career
2017–2019	DR Congo	13	(0)

Managerial career
- 2025–2026: Dinamo București (mental coach)
- 2026–: Dinamo II București (mental coach)
- * Club domestic league appearances and goals

Wilfred Moke Abro (born 12 February 1988) is a former DR Congolese professional footballer who played as a defensive midfielder or centre back, currently mental coach at Liga III club Dinamo II București.

== International career ==
Moke made his debut for the DR Congo national team in a 2–0 friendly win against Botswana on 5 June 2017.

== Career statistics ==
=== Club ===
Appearances and goals by club, season and competition
Club	Season	League			National cup		League cup		Europe		Other		Total	
Club	Season	Division	Apps	Goals	Apps	Goals	Apps	Goals	Apps	Goals	Apps	Goals	Apps	Goals
San Fernando	2007–08	Tercera División	29	0	0	0	–		–		–		29	0
Puertollano	2008–09	Segunda División B	0	0	–		–		–		–		0	0
Socuéllamos	2008–09	Tercera División	?	?	?	?	–		–		–		?	?
Écija	2009–10	Segunda División B	35	0	0	0	–		–		–		35	0
Cádiz	2010–11	Segunda División B	19	0	2	0	–		–		2 (Note: Appearance in Segunda División B promotion/relegation play-offs)	0	23	1
Cádiz	2011–12	Segunda División B	21	0	4	0	–		–		4	0	29	0
Cádiz	2012–13	Segunda División B	36	0	1	0	–		–		–		37	0
Cádiz	Total		76	0	7	0	–		–		6	0	89	0
Burgos	2013–14	Segunda División B	32	1	3	0	–		–		–		35	1
Burgos	2014–15	Segunda División B	33	0	0	0	–		–		–		33	0
Burgos	Total		65	1	3	0	–		–		–		68	1
Rapid București	2015–16	Liga II	15	0	0	0	–		–		–		15	0
Voluntari	2015–16	Liga I	15	0	–		–		–		2 (Note: Appearance in Liga I promotion/relegation play-offs)	0	17	0
Voluntari	2016–17	Liga I	6	0	–		1	0	–		–		7	0
Voluntari	Total		21	0	–		1	0	–		2	0	24	0
FCSB	Liga I	2016–17	27	1	1	0	3	0	5 (Note: Appearances in UEFA Europa League)	0	–		36	1
Konyaspor	2017–18	Süper Lig	21	1	3	0	–		4	0	1 (Note: Appearance in Turkish Super Cup)	0	29	1
Konyaspor	2018–19	Süper Lig	6	0	1	0	–		–		–		7	0
Konyaspor	Total		27	1	4	0	–		4	0	1	0	36	1
Ankaragücü	2018–19	Süper Lig	13	0	–		–		–		–		13	0
Ankaragücü	2019–20	Süper Lig	17	0	–		–		–		–		17	0
Ankaragücü	Total		30	0	–		–		–		–		30	0
Career total			331	3	15	0	4	0	9	0	9	0	368	3

=== International ===
Appearances and goals by national team and year
National team	Year	Apps	Goals
DR Congo	2017	4	0
DR Congo	2018	2	0
DR Congo	2019	7	0
Total		13	0

== Honours ==
Cádiz

- Segunda División B: 2011–12

Rapid București

- Liga II: 2015–16

Konyaspor

- Turkish Super Cup: 2017
