= Dan Popescu =

Romanian footballer

Personal information
- Date of birth: 20 February 1988 (age 38)
- Place of birth: Tulcea, Romania
- Height: 1.73 m (5 ft 8 in)
- Position: Left back

Senior career*
| Years | Team | Apps | (Gls) |
| 2006–2013 | Dunărea Galați | 140 | (3) |
| 2013–2015 | Oțelul Galați | 64 | (0) |
| 2015–2016 | Poli Timișoara | 37 | (2) |
| 2016–2017 | FCSB | 2 | (0) |
| 2016–2017 | → FCSB II | 11 | (0) |
| 2017 | → Concordia Chiajna (loan) | 9 | (0) |
| 2018 | Juventus București | 11 | (0) |
| 2019–2020 | CSM Slatina | 9 | (0) |
| 2020–2021 | Oțelul Galați | 6 | (0) |
| Total | | 289 | (5) |

Managerial career
- 2021–: Delta Tulcea
- * Club domestic league appearances and goals as of 17:22, 20 January 2024 (UTC)

Daniel Popescu (born 20 February 1988) is a Romanian former footballer who played as a left back.

== Career statistics ==
=== Club ===
As of match played 17 November 2017

| Club | Season | League | | Cup | | League Cup | | Europe | | Other | | Total | |
| Club | Season | Apps | Goals | Apps | Goals | Apps | Goals | Apps | Goals | Apps | Goals | Apps | Goals |
|---|---|---|---|---|---|---|---|---|---|---|---|---|---|
| Dunărea Galați | 2006–07 | 16 | 0 | ? | ? | – | | – | | – | | 16 | 0 |
| Dunărea Galați | 2007–08 | 24 | 0 | ? | ? | – | | – | | – | | 24 | 0 |
| Dunărea Galați | 2008–09 | 12 | 0 | ? | ? | – | | – | | – | | 12 | 0 |
| Dunărea Galați | 2009–10 | 23 | 0 | ? | ? | – | | – | | – | | 23 | 0 |
| Dunărea Galați | 2010–11 | 28 | 1 | ? | ? | – | | – | | – | | 28 | 1 |
| Dunărea Galați | 2011–12 | 27 | 1 | 2 | 0 | – | | – | | – | | 29 | 1 |
| Dunărea Galați | 2012–13 | 10 | 1 | 0 | 0 | – | | – | | – | | 10 | 1 |
| Total | | 140 | 3 | 2 | 0 | – | – | – | – | – | – | 142 | 3 |
| Oțelul Galați | 2012–13 | 5 | 0 | 0 | 0 | – | | – | | – | | 5 | 0 |
| Oțelul Galați | 2013–14 | 30 | 0 | 1 | 0 | – | | – | | – | | 31 | 0 |
| Oțelul Galați | 2014–15 | 29 | 0 | 2 | 0 | 0 | 0 | – | | – | | 31 | 0 |
| Total | | 64 | 0 | 3 | 0 | 0 | 0 | – | – | – | – | 67 | 0 |
| ACS Poli Timișoara | 2015–16 | 37 | 2 | 2 | 0 | 2 | 0 | – | | – | | 41 | 2 |
| Total | | 37 | 2 | 2 | 0 | 2 | 0 | – | – | – | – | 41 | 2 |
| FCSB | 2016–17 | 2 | 0 | 1 | 0 | 1 | 0 | 1 | 0 | – | | 5 | 0 |
| Total | | 2 | 0 | 1 | 0 | 1 | 0 | 1 | 0 | – | – | 5 | 0 |
| FCSB II | 2016–17 | 10 | 0 | – | | – | | – | | – | | 10 | 0 |
| FCSB II | 2017–18 | 1 | 0 | – | | – | | – | | – | | 1 | 0 |
| Total | | 11 | 0 | – | – | – | – | – | – | – | – | 11 | 0 |
| Concordia Chiajna (loan) | 2016–17 | 9 | 0 | – | | – | | – | | – | | 9 | 0 |
| Total | | 9 | 0 | – | – | – | – | – | – | – | – | 9 | 0 |
| Career Total | | 263 | 5 | 8 | 0 | 3 | 0 | 1 | 0 | – | – | 275 | 5 |

== Honours ==
=== Club ===
Steaua București

- League Cup: 2015–16
