= Fernando Boldrin =

Brazilian footballer (born 1989)

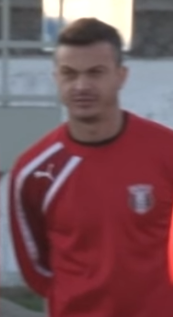
- Boldrin with Astra Giurgiu in 2016

Personal information
- Full name: Fernando Henrique Boldrin
- Date of birth: 23 February 1989 (age 37)
- Place of birth: Cravinhos, Brazil
- Height: 1.81 m (5 ft 11 in)
- Position: Attacking midfielder

Team information
- Current team: Ferroviária
- Number: 10

Senior career*
Years	Team	Apps	(Gls)
2007–2011	São Carlos	14	(5)
2007	→ Slovan Liberec (loan)	6	(0)
2010–2011	→ Portuguesa (loan)	8	(7)
2012	Guaratinguetá	4	(0)
2013	Arapongas	15	(2)
2014	Velo Clube	17	(1)
2014–2015	Concordia Chiajna	32	(6)
2015–2016	Astra Giurgiu	35	(6)
2016–2017	Steaua București	30	(8)
2017–2019	Kayserispor	28	(3)
2018–2019	→ Çaykur Rizespor (loan)	30	(4)
2019–2022	Çaykur Rizespor	80	(13)
2022–2023	Samsunspor	8	(0)
2023	Juventude	12	(0)
2023	Ferroviária	0	(0)
Total		319	(55)
- * Club domestic league appearances and goals as of 16 April 2023

Fernando Henrique Boldrin (born 23 February 1989) is a former Brazilian professional footballer who played as an attacking midfielder.

== Career ==
=== Early career ===
Boldrin played as a junior for Slovan Liberec in the Czech Republic, but spent the first part of his senior career in the lower leagues of native Brazil.

=== Concordia Chiajna ===
In 2014, aged 25, Boldrin was brought to Romanian club Concordia Chiajna by coach Marius Șumudică. He ended the Liga I season with 32 matches and 6 goals, earning interest from better ranked clubs after scoring a double against defending champions Steaua București in May 2015. "The Eagles" finished on the 12th place, narrowly avoiding relegation.

=== Astra Giurgiu ===
During the 2015 summer transfer window, Boldrin signed a contract with FC Astra Giurgiu, rejoining his former Concordia coach Marius Șumudică. On 26 July, he scored his first goal in a 2–1 victory against fellow Liga I team Universitatea Craiova. The following week Boldrin netted a goal in the UEFA Europa League third qualifying round's first leg against West Ham United, helping his team obtain a 2–2 away draw at Boleyn Ground. Astra eventually qualified further, and he scored again against AZ Alkmaar in the first leg of the play-off round.

Boldrin, who ended the campaign with 42 matches and seven goals all competitions comprised, helped Astra achieve its first league championship title in their history. He was also a starter in the 2016 Romanian Supercup 1–0 win over CFR Cluj.

=== FCSB ===
On 12 August 2016, FC Steaua București announced the transfer of Boldrin for an undisclosed fee, with the player penning a four-year contract with the club.

=== Kayerispor ===
Fernando joined Kayserispor in 2017. He played 23 matches in his debut season in the Turkish Süper Lig, with Kayserispor avoiding relegation.

=== Çaykur Rizespor ===
After one season with Kayserispor, Boldrin joined Çaykur Rizespor, also in the Turkish Super Lig, on a season-long loan deal.

On 7 August 2019, he joined Çaykur Rizespor on a permanent three-year deal.

== Style of play ==
Boldrin is a central midfielder who takes free kicks for his team, contributing both towards offensive and defensive phases of the match

== Career statistics ==
As of match played 13 May 2017

Appearances and goals by club, season and competition
Club	Season	League		National cup		League cup		Continental		Other		Total	
Club	Season	Apps	Goals	Apps	Goals	Apps	Goals	Apps	Goals	Apps	Goals	Apps	Goals
São Carlos	2007			–		–		–		–			
São Carlos	2008			–		–		–		–			
São Carlos	2009			–		–		–		–			
São Carlos	2010			–		–		–		–			
São Carlos	2011			–		–		–		–			
São Carlos	Total	14	5	–	–	–	–	–	–	–	–	14	5
Slovan Liberec (loan)	2006–07	6	0	–		–		–		–		6	0
Portuguesa (loan)	2010			–		–		–		–			
Portuguesa (loan)	2011			–		–		–		–			
Portuguesa (loan)	Total	8	7	–	–	–	–	–	–	–	–	8	7
Guaratinguetá	2012	4	0	–		–		–		–		4	0
Arapongas	2013	15	2	–		–		–		–		15	2
Velo Clube	2014	17	1	–		–		–		–		17	1
Concordia Chiajna	2014–15	32	6	1	0	0	0	–		–		33	6
Astra Giurgiu	2015–16	32	5	1	0	3	0	6	2	–		42	7
Astra Giurgiu	2016–17	3	1	0	0	0	0	2	0	1	0	6	1
Astra Giurgiu	Total	35	6	1	0	3	0	8	2	1	0	48	8
FCSB	2016–17	30	8	1	0	2	0	6	0	–		39	8
Kayserispor	2017–18	4	0	0	0	–		–		–		4	0
Career total		165	35	3	0	5	0	14	2	1	0	188	37

== Honours ==
Astra Giurgiu

- Liga I: 2015–16
- Supercupa României: 2016

Individual

- Gazeta Sporturilor Foreign Player of the Year in Romania: 2016
