= Theodor Botă =

Romanian footballer

Personal information
- Full name: Theodor Constantin Botă
- Date of birth: 24 May 1997 (age 29)
- Place of birth: Râmnicu Vâlcea, Romania
- Position: Striker

Senior career*
Years	Team	Apps	(Gls)
2016–2019	FCSB	1	(0)
2016	→ Gloria Buzău (loan)	4	(0)
2016–2019	→ FCSB II	37	(3)
- * Club domestic league appearances and goals as of 17 November 2017

Theodor Constantin Botă (born 24 May 1997 in Râmnicu Vâlcea) is a Romanian professional footballer who plays as striker.

== Career statistics ==
=== Club ===
Club	Season	League		Cup		League Cup		Europe		Other		Total	
Club	Season	Apps	Goals	Apps	Goals	Apps	Goals	Apps	Goals	Apps	Goals	Apps	Goals
Gloria Buzău	2015–16	4	0	–		–		–		–		4	0
Total		4	0	–	–	–	–	–	–	–	–	4	0
FCSB	2016–17	1	0	0	0	0	0	0	0	–		1	0
Total		1	0	0	0	0	0	0	0	–	–	1	0
FCSB II	2016–17	24	2	–		–		–		–		24	2
FCSB II	2017–18	13	1	–		–		–		–		13	1
Total		37	3	–	–	–	–	–	–	–	–	37	3
Career Total		42	3	0	0	0	0	0	0	–	–	42	3

Statistics accurate as of match played 17 November 2017
