= Sebastian Chitoșcă =

Romanian footballer

Sebastian Chitosca
Personal information
- Full name: Sebastian Gabriel Chitoșcă
- Date of birth: 2 October 1992 (age 34)
- Place of birth: Piatra Neamț, Romania
- Height: 1.74 m (5 ft 8 1/2 in)
- Position: Midfielder

Youth career
- 2002–2011: Ceahlăul Piatra Neamț

Senior career*
Years	Team	Apps	(Gls)
2011–2016	Ceahlăul Piatra Neamț	91	(8)
2016–2017	FCSB II	9	(4)
2016–2017	FCSB	5	(0)
2016	→ Voluntari (loan)	4	(0)
2017	→ Brașov (loan)	7	(2)
2017–2019	Botoșani	32	(1)
2019	Universitatea Cluj	3	(1)

International career^{‡}
2011	Romania U19	2	(1)
- * Club domestic league appearances and goals as of 2 April 2019 ‡ National team caps and goals as of 18 January 2013

Sebastian Gabriel Chitoșcă (born 2 October 1992) is a retired Romanian professional footballer who played as a left or right midfielder.

== International career ==
Chitoșcă was selected Romania's squad for the 2011 UEFA European Under-19 Championship, which took place in his native country. He made his debut for the team in the same tournament on 20 July 2011 in a game against Greece.

== Career statistics ==
Appearances and goals by club, season and competition
Club	Season	League		Cup		League Cup		Europe		Other		Total	
Club	Season	Apps	Goals	Apps	Goals	Apps	Goals	Apps	Goals	Apps	Goals	Apps	Goals
Ceahlăul Piatra Neamț	2010–11	15	0	0	0	–		–		–		15	0
Ceahlăul Piatra Neamț	2011–12	7	0	0	0	–		–		–		7	0
Ceahlăul Piatra Neamț	2012–13	2	0	0	0	–		–		–		2	0
Ceahlăul Piatra Neamț	2013–14	27	2	1	0	–		–		–		28	2
Ceahlăul Piatra Neamț	2014–15	30	0	1	0	1	0	–		–		32	0
Ceahlăul Piatra Neamț	2015–16	10	2	0	0	–		–		–		10	2
Ceahlăul Piatra Neamț	Total	91	4	2	0	1	0	–		–		94	4
Voluntari (loan)	2015–16	4	0	–		–		–		–		4	0
FCSB (FC Steaua Bucuresti)	2016–17	0	0	1	0	0	0	0	0	–		1	0
Steaua II București	2016–17	9	2	–		–		–		–		9	2
Brașov	2016–17	7	2	–		–		–		–		7	2
Botoșani	2017–18	0	0	0	0	–		–		–		0	0
Career total		111	8	3	0	1	0	–		–		115	8

Statistics accurate as of match played 29 May 2017
