= Cătălin Ștefănescu =

Romanian footballer

Personal information
- Full name: Cătălin Andrei Ștefănescu
- Date of birth: 30 November 1994 (age 31)
- Place of birth: Piatra Neamț, Romania
- Height: 1.79 m (5 ft 10 1/2 in)
- Positions: Centre midfielder; winger

Team information
- Current team: Șoimii Gura Humorului
- Number: 23

Youth career
- –2012: Ceahlăul Piatra Neamț

Senior career*
Years	Team	Apps	(Gls)
2012–2015	Ceahlăul Piatra Neamț	55	(2)
2016–2017	FCSB	0	(0)
2016	→ FC Voluntari (loan)	4	(1)
2016–2017	→ Politehnica Iași (loan)	30	(4)
2017–2019	Politehnica Iași	23	(0)
2018–2019	→ Petrolul Ploiești (loan)	22	(5)
2019	Petrolul Ploiești	7	(0)
2020–2021	Universitatea Cluj	17	(0)
2021–2024	Ceahlăul Piatra Neamț	46	(3)
2023–2024	→ Minaur Baia Mare (loan)	33	(5)
2025–	Șoimii Gura Humorului	12	(9)

International career^{‡}
2014–2015	Romania U21	3	(0)
- * Club domestic league appearances and goals as of 09:30, 15 June 2023 (UTC) ‡ National team caps and goals as of 12 June 2016

Cătălin Andrei Ștefănescu (born 30 November 1994) is a Romanian professional footballer who plays as a centre midfielder for Șoimii Gura Humorului.

== Club career ==
=== Politehnica Iași ===
In August 2017, after a loan to Liga I champions Viitorul Constanța fell through, Politehnica Iași transferred Ștefănescu from FCSB on a permanent basis. The transfer fee was undisclosed and the player later signed a two-year contract with his former team.

== Career statistics ==
=== Club ===
Club statistics
Club	Season	League		Cup		Europe		Total	
Club	Season	Apps	Goals	Apps	Goals	Apps	Goals	Apps	Goals
Ceahlăul Piatra Neamț
Ceahlăul Piatra Neamț	2012–13	5	0	1	0	–		6	0
Ceahlăul Piatra Neamț	2013–14	9	0	1	0	–		10	0
Ceahlăul Piatra Neamț	2014–15	29	2	2	0	–		31	2
Ceahlăul Piatra Neamț	2015–16	12	0	0	0	–		12	0
Ceahlăul Piatra Neamț	Total	55	2	4	0	–		59	2
FC Voluntari
FC Voluntari	2015–16	4	1	0	0	–		4	1
Politehnica Iași
Politehnica Iași	2016–17	30	4	2	0	–		32	4
Politehnica Iași	2017–18	20	0	2	1	–		22	1
Politehnica Iași	2018–19	3	0	0	0	–		3	0
Politehnica Iași	Total	53	4	4	1	–		57	5
Petrolul Ploiesti (loan)	2018-19	22	5	0	0			22	5
Petrolul Ploiesti	2019-20	7	0	1	0			8	0
Petrolul Ploiesti	Total	29	5	1	0	0	0	30	5
Career total		141	12	9	1	0	0	150	13
