= Vlad Achim =

Romanian footballer

Personal information
- Full name: Vlad Alexandru Achim
- Date of birth: 7 April 1989 (age 37)
- Place of birth: Constanța, Romania
- Height: 1.82 m (6 ft 0 in)
- Position: Midfielder

Team information
- Current team: SCM Râmnicu Vâlcea
- Number: 6

Youth career
- 1996–2004: Farul Constanța
- 2004–2006: Elpis Constanța

Senior career*
Years	Team	Apps	(Gls)
2006–2007	CS Ovidiu		
2008–2015	Ceahlăul Piatra Neamț	189	(20)
2015–2016	Viitorul Constanța	17	(2)
2016	Voluntari	15	(2)
2016–2018	FCSB	25	(1)
2018	→ Botoșani (loan)	12	(0)
2018–2020	Viitorul Constanța	56	(6)
2020–2021	Dinamo București	29	(1)
2021–2025	FC U Craiova	95	(3)
2025–	SCM Râmnicu Vâlcea	0	(0)
- * Club domestic league appearances and goals as of 10 May 2025

Vlad Alexandru Achim (born 7 April 1989) is a Romanian professional footballer who plays as a midfielder for Liga II club SCM Râmnicu Vâlcea.

== Club career ==
Achim spent most of his professional career with Ceahlăul Piatra Neamț, for which he appeared in 162 first division matches between 2008 and 2015. Among others, he also represented FCSB and Viitorul Constanța, where he won three domestic trophies combined.

On 8 December 2016, Achim scored his first goal in European competitions in a UEFA Europa League group stage 1–2 loss of FC Steaua București to Villarreal.

In 2018, he rejoined Viitorul Constanța.

On 18 August 2020, Achim signed a two-year contract with Dinamo București.

== International career ==
Achim got his first call-up to the senior Romania squad in a UEFA Euro 2016 qualifying against Greece in September 2014, but did not register his debut.

== Honours ==
Ceahlăul Piatra Neamț

- Liga II: 2008–09, 2010–11

FCSB

- Cupa Ligii: 2015–16

Viitorul Constanța

- Cupa României: 2018–19
- Supercupa României: 2019
