= Petre Ivanovici =

Romanian footballer

Personal information
- Full name: Petre Daniel Ivanovici
- Date of birth: 2 March 1990 (age 36)
- Place of birth: Timișoara, Romania
- Height: 1.75 m (5 ft 9 in)
- Position: Midfielder

Youth career
- 1998–2007: FC Auto Timișoara

Senior career*
Years	Team	Apps	(Gls)
2007–2008	CFR Timișoara	3	(0)
2008–2009	ALTO Gradimento Albina	10	(1)
2010–2011	Dunakanyar-Vác	43	(9)
2011–2014	Farul Constanța	73	(11)
2014–2016	Botoșani	45	(8)
2016–2018	Voluntari	69	(11)
2018–2020	Concordia Chiajna	46	(1)
2020–2021	ASU Politehnica	24	(4)
2021–2022	FK Csíkszereda	38	(6)
2023–2024	Minaur Baia Mare	7	(0)
Total		358	(51)
- * Club domestic league appearances and goals

Petre Daniel Ivanovici (born 2 March 1990) is a Romanian professional footballer played as a midfielder.

== Honours ==
FC Voluntari

- Romanian Cup: 2016–17
- Romanian Supercup: 2017
