= 2017–18 FCSB season =

FCSB
2017–18 season
- President: Valeriu Argăseală
- Manager: Nicolae Dică
- Stadium: Arena Națională
- Liga I: 2nd
- Cupa României: Quarter-finals
- Champions League: Play-off round
- Europa League: Round of 32
- Top goalscorer: League: Harlem Gnohéré (15); All: Harlem Gnohéré (21)
- Highest home attendance: 49,220 vs Sporting CP (23 August 2017, Champions League)
- Lowest home attendance: 1,000 vs Sepsi Sfântu Gheorghe (25 February 2018, Liga I)
- Average home league attendance: 9,917
Home colours	Away colours

The 2017–18 season was FCSB's 70th season since its founding in 1947.

== Previous season positions ==
	Competition	Position
(European Union)	UEFA Champions League	Play-off round
(European Union)	UEFA Europa League	4th / Group stage
(Romania)	Liga I	2nd
(Romania)	Cupa României	Round of 16
(Romania)	Cupa Ligii	Semi-finals

== Players ==
=== First team squad ===
As of 23 February 2018

Note: Flags indicate national team as defined under FIFA eligibility rules; some limited exceptions apply. Players may hold more than one non-FIFA nationality.

No.	Pos.	Nation	Player
2	DF	ROU	Romario Benzar
3	DF	ROU	Ionuț Larie
4	DF	ROU	Mihai Bălașa (vice-captain)
5	MF	ROU	Mihai Pintilii (3rd captain)
6	MF	ROU	Dragoș Nedelcu
7	FW	ROU	Denis Alibec
8	MF	ROU	Lucian Filip
9	FW	FRA	Harlem Gnohéré
10	FW	ROU	Florin Tănase (captain)
11	FW	ROU	Constantin Budescu
12	DF	BRA	Júnior Morais
15	DF	SRB	Marko Momčilović

No.	Pos.	Nation	Player
16	DF	SRB	Bogdan Planić
17	FW	ROU	Florinel Coman
19	DF	POR	Artur Jorge (on loan from Braga)
23	MF	ROU	Ovidiu Popescu
25	DF	ROU	Valerică Găman
30	MF	ROU	Cristian Tănase (4th captain)
33	GK	ROU	Eduard Stăncioiu
34	GK	ROU	Cristian Bălgrădean
80	MF	POR	Filipe Teixeira
98	FW	ROU	Dennis Man
99	GK	ROU	Andrei Vlad

=== Transfers ===
==== In ====
No.	Pos.	Nat.	Name	Age	EU	Moving from	Type	Transfer window	Ends	Transfer fee	Source
12	GK	(Romania)	Valentin Cojocaru	21	EU	Frosinone (Italy)	Loan return	Summer	Undisclosed	—	
16	MF	(Romania)	Robert Vâlceanu	20	EU	UTA Arad	Loan return	Summer	2019	—	
24	DF	(Romania)	Dan Popescu	29	EU	Concordia Chiajna	Loan return	Summer	Undisclosed	—	
25	MF	(Romania)	Rareș Enceanu	22	EU	Brașov	Loan return	Summer	2019	—	
26	ST	(Romania)	Cristian Onțel	19	EU	Academica Clinceni	Loan return	Summer	2020	—	
35	MF	(Romania)	Sebastian Chitoșcă	24	EU	Brașov	Loan return	Summer	2021	—	
26	ST	(Romania)	Daniel Benzar	19	EU	Academica Clinceni	Loan return	Summer	2019	—	
—	MF	(Romania)	Cătălin Ștefănescu	22	EU	CSM Politehnica Iași	Loan return	Summer	2020	—	
13	DF	(Brazil)	Júnior Morais	30	Non-EU	Astra Giurgiu	Transfer	Summer	2020	Robert Vâlceanu	steauafc.com
3	DF	(Romania)	Ionuț Larie	30	EU	CFR Cluj	Transfer	Summer	2019	Free	steauafc.com
11	FW	(Romania)	Constantin Budescu	28	EU	Astra Giurgiu	Transfer	Summer	2021	€750,000	steauafc.com
—	GK	(Romania)	Toma Niga	19	EU	Foresta Suceava	Transfer	Summer	Undisclosed	€30,000	
24	MF	(Romania)	Paul Szecui	16	EU	Argeș Pitești	Transfer	Summer	Undisclosed	€25,000	
80	MF	(Portugal)	Filipe Teixeira	36	EU	Astra Giurgiu	Transfer	Summer	2018	Free	steauafc.com
27	FW	(Romania)	Robert Grecu	19	EU	Viitorul Constanța	Loan	Summer	2018	€30,000	
99	GK	(Romania)	Andrei Vlad	18	EU	CS U Craiova	Transfer	Summer	2023	€400,000	steauafc.com
22	FW	(Romania)	Cătălin Golofca	27	EU	Botoșani	Transfer	Summer	2021	€400,000 for 40% rights	steauafc.com
6	MF	(Romania)	Dragoș Nedelcu	20	EU	Viitorul Constanța	Transfer	Summer	2022	€2,000,000	steauafc.com
22	DF	(Romania)	Romario Benzar	25	EU	Viitorul Constanța	Transfer	Summer	2022	€1,200,000	steauafc.com
18	MF	(Romania)	Vlad Mihalcea	18	EU	ACS Poli Timișoara	Loan return	Summer	2021	—	
19	DF	(Portugal)	Artur Jorge Marques Amorim	23	EU	Braga (Portugal)	Loan	Summer	2018	—	steauafc.com
17	FW	(Romania)	Florinel Coman	19	EU	Viitorul Constanța	Transfer	Summer	2022	€3,000,000	steauafc.com
16	DF	(Serbia)	Bogdan Planić	25	Non-EU	Vojvodina (Serbia)	Transfer	Summer	2021	€400,000	steauafc.com
—	DF	(Romania)	Gabriel Simion	19	EU	Academica Clinceni	Loan return	Winter	2021	—	
25	DF	(Romania)	Valerică Găman	28	EU	Kardemir Karabükspor (Turkey)	Transfer	Winter	2020	Free	steauafc.com
30	MF	(Romania)	Cristian Tănase	30	EU	Kardemir Karabükspor (Turkey)	Transfer	Winter	2018	Free	steauafc.com
1	GK	(Romania)	Toma Niga	20	EU	Academica Clinceni	Loan return	Winter	2022	—	
34	GK	(Romania)	Cristian Bălgrădean	29	EU	Concordia Chiajna	Transfer	Winter	2020	50,000	steauafc.com

==== Out ====
No.	Pos.	Nat.	Name	Age	EU	Moving to	Type	Transfer window	Transfer fee	Source
4	DF	(Romania)	Gabriel Tamaș	33	EU	Hapoel Haifa (Israel)	Mutual termination	Summer	—	steauafc.com
—	MF	(Ghana)	Sulley Muniru	24	Non-EU	Tondela (Portugal)	Mutual termination	Summer	—	steauafc.com
—	MF	(France) (Algeria)	Jugurtha Hamroun	28	EU	Al Sadd (Qatar)	Transfer	Summer	€1,000,000	
16	MF	(Romania)	Robert Vâlceanu	20	EU	Astra Giurgiu	Transfer	Summer	Júnior Morais	
21	DF	(France) (Democratic Republic of the Congo)	Wilfred Moke	29	EU	Konyaspor (Turkey)	End of contract	Summer	—	steauafc.com
27	MF	(Portugal) (Brazil)	Fernando Boldrin	28	EU	Kayserispor (Turkey)	Transfer	Summer	€1,200,000	steauafc.com
32	GK	(Romania)	Ionuț Poiană	19	EU	Luceafărul Oradea	Loan	Summer	—	
—	GK	(Romania)	Valentin Cojocaru	21	EU	Apollon Limassol (Cyprus)	Mutual termination	Summer	—	
18	MF	(Romania)	Vlad Mihalcea	18	EU	ACS Poli Timișoara	Loan	Summer	—	steauafc.com
—	GK	(Romania)	Toma Niga	19	EU	Academica Clinceni	Loan	Summer	—	
—	DF	(Romania)	Gabriel Simion	19	EU	Academica Clinceni	Loan	Summer	—	
30	ST	(Romania)	Alexandru Tudorie	21	EU	Voluntari	Transfer	Summer	—	steauafc.com
—	MF	(Croatia)	Antonio Jakoliš	25	EU	Apollon Limassol (Cyprus)	Loan	Summer	€25,000	steauafc.com
—	MF	(Romania)	Cătălin Ștefănescu	22	EU	CSM Politehnica Iași	Transfer	Summer	€15,000	
35	MF	(Romania)	Sebastian Chitoșcă	24	EU	Botoșani	Transfer	Summer	—	
18	MF	(Romania)	Vlad Mihalcea	18	EU	Academica Clinceni	Loan	Summer	—	
26	ST	(Romania)	Cristian Onțel	19	EU	Voința Saelele	Transfer	Summer	—	
27	FW	(Romania)	Robert Grecu	19	EU	Viitorul Constanța	End of loan	Summer	—	
22	DF	(Romania)	Cătălin Golofca	27	EU	Botoșani	Loan	Winter	—	steauafc.com
20	MF	(Romania)	Vlad Achim	28	EU	Botoșani	Loan	Winter	—	steauafc.com
13	DF	(Romania)	Marian Pleașcă	27	EU	Voluntari	Loan	Winter	—	steauafc.com
26	FW	(Romania)	Daniel Benzar	20	EU	Voluntari	Loan	Winter	—	steauafc.com
—	DF	(Romania)	Gabriel Simion	19	EU	Juventus București	Loan	Winter	—	
—	DF	(Romania)	Mario Mihai	18	EU	Academica Clinceni	Loan	Winter	—	
29	MF	(Romania) (Brazil)	William De Amorim	26	EU	Kayserispor (Turkey)	Loan	Winter	—	steauafc.com
24	DF	(Romania)	Paul Szecui	17	EU	Metaloglobus București	Loan	Winter	—	
1	GK	(Romania)	Florin Niță	30	EU	Sparta Prague (Czech Republic)	Transfer	Winter	€2,000,000	steauafc.com
1	GK	(Romania)	Toma Niga	20	EU	Hermannstadt	Loan	Winter	—	
44	DF	(Romania)	Gabriel Enache	27	EU	Rubin Kazan (Russia)	Mutual termination	Winter	—	steauafc.com

==== Overall transfer activity ====
===== Expenditure =====
Summer: ▼€8,110,000

Winter: ▼€50,000

Total: ▼€8,160,000

===== Income =====
Summer: ▲€2,240,000

Winter: ▲€2,000,000

Total: ▲€4,240,000

===== Net Totals =====
Summer: ▼€5,870,000

Winter: ▲€1,950,000

Total: ▼€3,920,000

== Friendly matches ==
Win Draw Loss

29 June 2017 Friendly	Steaua București (Romania)	Canceled	(Ukraine) Shakhtar Donetsk	Emsbüren, Germany
18:00 EET (UTC+2)

29 June 2017 Friendly	Steaua București (Romania)	7–0	(Netherlands) Team Regio Arnhem	Wenum Wiesel, Netherlands
20:30 EET (UTC+2)	Gnohéré 7', 21'; Budescu 30', 42'; Jakoliš 51'; D. Benzar 58'; Mihalcea 61'	Report		Stadium: WWNA; Attendance: 0 (closed doors)

2 July 2017 Friendly	Steaua București (Romania)	1–1	(Ukraine) Oleksandriya	Wenum Wiesel, Netherlands
19:00 EET (UTC+2)	Gnohéré 44'		Ohirya 76'	Stadium: WWNA; Attendance: 200

4 July 2017 Friendly	Steaua București (Romania)	3–0	(Belgium) Waasland-Beveren	Doorwerth, Netherlands
19:00 EET (UTC+2)	Budescu 28', 71'; De Amorim 48'			Stadium: Voetbalvereniging Duno; Attendance: 0 (closed doors)

7 July 2017 Friendly	Steaua București (Romania)	0–2	(Belgium) KV Oostende	Doorwerth, Netherlands
19:00 EET (UTC+2)			Cyriac 66'; Lombaerts 88'	Stadium: Voetbalvereniging Duno; Attendance: 0 (closed doors)

13 July 2017 Friendly	Steaua București (Romania)	3–3	(Romania) Chindia Târgoviște	Bucharest, Romania
EET (UTC+2)	D. Benzar; Teixeira; Alibec (pen.)		Mihai Neicuțescu; Matei	Stadium: Baza Sportivă Steaua București

5 September 2017 Friendly	Academica Clinceni (Romania)	0–4	(Romania) Steaua București	Clinceni, Romania
EET (UTC+2)			Achim 29'; Budescu 41'; Tănase 45+1' (pen.); Gnohéré 61'	Stadium: Clinceni; Attendance: 1,200

18 January 2018 Friendly	Steaua București (Romania)	1–2	(Ukraine) Olimpik Donetsk	Belek, Turkey
14:00 EET (UTC+2)	Man 30'		Bilenkyi 53', 69'	Stadium: Gloria Sports Arena; Attendance: 100

25 January 2018 Friendly	Steaua București (Romania)	2–3	(Austria) Admira Wacker	Coín, Spain
17:00 EET (UTC+2)	Teixeira 53'; Budescu 80' (pen.)		Grozurek 4', 31'; Schmidt 33'	Stadium: Estadio Jose Burgos Quintana

28 January 2018 Friendly	Steaua București (Romania)	3–1	(China) Jiangsu Suning	Coín, Spain
17:00 EET (UTC+2)	Budescu 15', 50', 54'		Ye Erfan 81'	Stadium: Estadio Jose Burgos Quintana

30 January 2018 Friendly	Steaua București (Romania)	2–0	(Croatia) Osijek	Marbella, Spain
17:00 EET (UTC+2)	Fl. Tănase 11'; Teixeira 55'			Stadium: Dama de Noche Football Center

24 March 2018 Friendly	Concordia Chiajna (Romania)	2–1	(Romania) Steaua București	Chiajna, Romania
13:00 EET (UTC+2)	Albu 45'; Panait 82'		Alibec 5'	Stadium: Concordia

== Competitions ==
Win Draw Loss

=== Overview ===
Competition	First match	Last match	Starting round	Final position	Record							
Competition	First match	Last match	Starting round	Final position	Pld	W	D	L	GF	GA	GD	Win %
Liga I	16 July 2017	19 May 2018	Matchday 1	2nd	36	22	10	4	66	24	+42	61.11
Cupa României	25 October 2017	1 March 2018	Round of 32	Quarter-finals	3	2	0	1	9	4	+5	66.67
Champions League	25 July 2017	23 August 2017	Third qualifying round	Play-off round	4	1	2	1	7	8	−1	25.00
Europa League	14 September 2017	22 February 2018	Group stage	Round of 32	8	4	1	3	11	12	−1	50.00
Total					51	29	13	9	93	48	+45	56.86

Last updated: 20 May 2018.
Source: Competitions

=== Liga I ===
==== Regular season ====
Overall								Home						Away					
Pld	W	D	L	GF	GA	GD	Pts	W	D	L	GF	GA	GD	W	D	L	GF	GA	GD
26	16	7	3	52	18	+34	55	9	4	0	30	6	+24	7	3	3	22	12	+10

Source: FCSB

===== Table =====
Pos	Team	Pld	W	D	L	GF	GA	GD	Pts	Qualification
1	CFR Cluj	26	18	5	3	42	13	+29	59	Qualification for the Championship round
2	FCSB	26	16	7	3	52	18	+34	55	Qualification for the Championship round
3	Universitatea Craiova	26	14	9	3	41	26	+15	51	Qualification for the Championship round
4	Astra Giurgiu	26	12	8	6	38	27	+11	44 (Note: Astra is ahead of Viitorul on head-to-head results: Astra–Viitorul 3–1, Viitorul–Astra 1–1.)	Qualification for the Championship round
5	Viitorul Constanța	26	13	5	8	34	21	+13	44	Qualification for the Championship round

Source: LPF (in Romanian), Soccerway
Rules for classification: 1) Points; 2) Head-to-head points; 3) Head-to-head goal difference; 4) Head-to-head goals scored; 5) Goal difference; 6) Goals scored; 7) Play-off.

===== Position by round =====
Round	1	2	3	4	5	6	7	8	9	10	11	12	13	14	15	16	17	18	19	20	21	22	23	24	25	26
Ground	H	A	H	A	H	H	A	H	A	H	A	H	A	A	H	A	H	A	A	H	A	H	A	H	A	H
Result	W	W	D	W	D	D	W	W	L	W	D	W	W	D	W	W	W	L	L	W	W	W	W	D	D	W
Position	4	1	3	3	3	4	4	3	4	2	2	2	2	2	2	1	1	2	2	2	2	2	2	2	2	2

Source: Matches
A = Away; H = Home; W = Win; D = Draw; L = Loss

===== Results =====
16 July 2017 Round 1	Steaua București	2–1	Voluntari	Bucharest
21:00 EET (UTC+02)	Pintilii (yellow card) 6'; O. Popescu (yellow card) 29'; Budescu 34' (pen.); Gnohéré (yellow card) 36'; Man 90+2'		Răuță (yellow card) 7'; Lazăr (yellow card) 32'; Maftei (yellow card) 36'; Bălan 55'; M. Popescu (yellow card) 65'; Tăbăcariu (yellow card) 81'	Stadium: Arena Națională; Attendance: 10,237; Referee: George Găman; Assistant referees: Ciprian Danșa, Daniel Mitruți; Fourth official: George Rădulescu

21 July 2017 Round 2	Poli Timișoara	0–1	Steaua București	Timișoara
21:00 EET (UTC+02)	Țigănașu (yellow card) 4'; Vașvari (yellow card) 16'; Munteanu (yellow card) 35' (yellow-red card) 45+1'; Crețu (yellow card) 80'; Melinte (yellow card) 90+4'		Alibec (yellow card) 23'; Larie (yellow card) 36'; Gnohéré 63'; O. Popescu (yellow card) 79'; Teixeira (yellow card) 88'; Budescu (yellow card) 90+1'; Man (yellow card) 90+3'	Stadium: Dan Păltinișanu; Attendance: 20,000; Referee: Andrei Florin Chivulete; Assistant referees: Marius Nicoară, Alexandru Vodă; Fourth official: Horia Gabriel Mladinovici

30 July 2017 Round 3	Steaua București	1–1	Universitatea Craiova	Bucharest
21:00 EET (UTC+02)	Pintilii (yellow card) 39'; Júnior Morais (yellow card) 55'; Gnohéré 62'; Larie (yellow card) 86'; Bălașa (yellow card) 90+4'		Băluță 28', (yellow card) 55'; Mitriță (yellow card) 45+1'; Spahija (yellow card) 61'; Gustavo (yellow card) 90'; Dimitrov (yellow card) 90+2'	Stadium: Arena Națională; Attendance: 11,514; Referee: István Kovács; Assistant referees: Vasile Marinescu, Ovidiu Artene; Fourth official: George Rădulescu

6 August 2017 Round 4	Concordia Chiajna	1–2	Steaua București	Chiajna
21:00 EET (UTC+02)	Pena (yellow card) 13'; Cristescu 53'; Bălgrădean (yellow card) 86'		D. Benzar 75'; Man 85'	Stadium: Concordia; Attendance: 4,000; Referee: Alexandru Tudor; Assistant referees: Ciprian Danșa, Gabriel Bârjac; Fourth official: Adrian Viorel

9 August 2017 Round 5	Steaua București	1–1	CSM Politehnica Iași	Bucharest
21:45 EET (UTC+02)	Gnohéré 56' (pen.); Niță (yellow card) 89'		Platini 9'; Qaka (yellow card) 18'; Chelaru (yellow card) 82'; Spătaru (yellow card) 90+3'; Almeida (yellow card) 90+4'	Stadium: Arena Națională; Attendance: 5,038; Referee: Iulian Călin; Assistant referees: Valentin Avram, Vlad Bârleanu; Fourth official: Adrian Comănescu

12 August 2017 Round 6	Steaua București	1–1	Astra Giurgiu	Bucharest
21:00 EET (UTC+02)	Gnohéré 64', (yellow card) 83'; R. Benzar (yellow card) 69'; Larie (yellow card) 82'; Stăncioiu (yellow card) 85'		Moise 7', (yellow card) 70'; Gheorghe (yellow card) 24'; Dandea (yellow card) 30'; Ioniță (yellow card) 81' (yellow-red card) 82'; Iliev (yellow card) 90+3'	Stadium: Arena Națională; Attendance: 6,085; Referee: Adrian Cojocaru; Assistant referees: Sebastian Gheorghe, Vladimir Urzică; Fourth official: Horia Mladinovic

19 August 2017 Round 7	Juventus București	1–2	Steaua București	Ploiești
21:00 EET (UTC+02)	Jorge 1' (o.g.); Carabela (yellow card) 45' (yellow-red card) 72'; Sesar (yellow card) 45+1'; Călințaru (penalty missed) 90+6'		R. Benzar 22'; Man (yellow card) 17', (goal) 34'; Filip (yellow card) 62'; Gnohéré (yellow card) 75'; Pintilii (yellow card) 85'	Stadium: Ilie Oană; Attendance: 3,000; Referee: Marius Avram; Assistant referees: Mircea Orbuleț, Florin Păunescu; Fourth official: Robert Dumitru

27 August 2017 Round 8	Steaua București	2–0	Botoșani	Bucharest
21:00 EET (UTC+02)	Budescu 18'; R. Benzar (yellow card) 25'; O. Popescu (yellow card) 29'; Fl. Tănase 41'; Alibec (yellow card) 43'		Miron (yellow card) 17'; Burcă (yellow card) 43'; Mușat (yellow card) 89'	Stadium: Arena Națională; Attendance: 5,814; Referee: Sebastian Colțescu; Assistant referees: Radu Ghinguleac, Dragoș Iliescu; Fourth official: Sorin Antonie

9 September 2017 Round 9	Viitorul Constanța	1–0	Steaua București	Ovidiu
20:30 EET (UTC+02)	Eric 31', (yellow card) 45+1'; Țîru (yellow card) 37'; Cicâldău (yellow card) 80'; Drăguș (yellow card) 82'		Budescu (yellow card) 17'; Man (yellow card) 57'; Júnior Morais (yellow card) 71'	Stadium: Viitorul; Attendance: 5,000; Referee: George Găman; Assistant referees: Sebastian Gheorghe, Daniel Mitruți; Fourth official: Marcel Bîrsan

17 September 2017 Round 10	Steaua București	4–0	Gaz Metan Mediaș	Bucharest
20:30 EET (UTC+02)	Planić (yellow card) 3'; William 17'; Achim (yellow card) 41'; Fl. Tănase 48', 55'; Man 58'; Gnohéré (penalty missed) 88'		Voicu (yellow card) 53'; Mitić (yellow card) 88'	Stadium: Arena Națională; Attendance: 4,435; Referee: George Rădulescu; Assistant referees: Mircea Orbuleț, Imre-Laszlo Bucsi; Fourth official: Iulian Călin

21 September 2017 Round 11	CFR Cluj	1–1	Steaua București	Cluj-Napoca
21:00 EET (UTC+02)	Vera 45'; Camora (yellow card) 55'; Deac (yellow card) 78'		Pintilii (yellow card) 12'; Bălașa (yellow card) 33'; Alibec (yellow card) 41'; Budescu 63'	Stadium: Dr. Constantin Rădulescu; Attendance: 18,000; Referee: Ovidiu Hațegan; Assistant referees: Octavian Șovre, Sebastian Gheorghe; Fourth official: Iulian Dima

24 September 2017 Round 12	Steaua București	1–0	Dinamo București	Bucharest
20:30 EET (UTC+02)	Coman (yellow card) 25'; Momčilović 31'; Bălașa (yellow card) 34'; R. Benzar (yellow card) 45+2'; O. Popescu (yellow card) 73'; Budescu (penalty missed) 76'			Stadium: Arena Națională; Attendance: 26,833; Referee: István Kovács; Assistant referees: Ovidiu Artene, Vasile Marinescu; Fourth official: George Radulescu

1 October 2017 Round 13	Sepsi Sfântu Gheorghe	0–4	Steaua București	Brașov
20:30 EET (UTC+02)	Petrovikj (yellow card) 31'; I. Fülöp (yellow card) 61'; Nikolić (yellow card) 82'		Fl. Tănase 26' (pen.); Gnohéré 31' (pen.), (yellow card) 45+1'; Ghinga 34' (o.g.); D. Benzar 74'	Stadium: Silviu Ploeșteanu; Attendance: 6,000; Referee: Sebastian Colțescu; Assistant referees: Radu Ghinguleac, Ciprian Danșa; Fourth official: Ionuţ Coza

13 October 2017 Round 14	Voluntari	0–0	Steaua București	Voluntari
20:45 EET (UTC+02)	Răuță (yellow card) 38'; Acsinte (yellow card) 80'; Balaur (yellow card) 90+3'		Nedelcu (yellow card) 36'; Planić (yellow card) 58'; Teixeira (yellow card) 62'; Fl. Tănase (yellow card) 90+1'	Stadium: Anghel Iordănescu; Attendance: 3,437; Referee: Iulian Călin; Assistant referees: Marius Nicoară, George Florin Neacşu; Fourth official: Andrei Antonie

22 October 2017 Round 15	Steaua București	7–0	Poli Timișoara	Bucharest
20:45 EET (UTC+02)	Gnohéré 13', 41', 63'; Coman 34', 48'; Larie 61'; D. Benzar (yellow card) 80'; Fl. Tănase 85' (pen.)		Artean (yellow card) 29'; Šoljić (yellow card) 78' (yellow-red card) 84'	Stadium: Arena Națională; Attendance: 4,753; Referee: George Găman; Assistant referees: Vladimir Urzică, Daniel Mitruți; Fourth official: Adrian Cojocaru

29 October 2017 Round 16	Universitatea Craiova	2–5	Steaua București	Drobeta-Turnu Severin
20:45 EET (UTC+02)	Larie 66' (o.g.); Kelić (yellow card) 27', (goal) 72'		Gnohéré 1'; Larie (yellow card) 16'; Teixeira 33'; Fl. Tănase 62', (yellow card) 73'; Kelić 69' (o.g.); Coman 83'; Pintilii (yellow card) 89'	Stadium: Municipal; Attendance: 10,000; Referee: István Kovács; Assistant referees: Vasile Marinescu, Ovidiu Artene; Fourth official: Andrei Antonie

5 November 2017 Round 17	Steaua București	2–1	Concordia Chiajna	Bucharest
20:45 EET (UTC+02)	Nedelcu 14'; Gnohéré 39'		Marc 17'; Patache (yellow card) 61'; Bumba (yellow card) 90'	Stadium: Arena Națională; Attendance: 3,524; Referee: Sebastian Colțescu; Assistant referees: Radu Ghinguleac, Dragoș Mihai Iliescu; Fourth official: Ionuţ Coza

17 November 2017 Round 18	CSM Politehnica Iași	1–0	Steaua București	Iaşi
20:45 EET (UTC+02)	Frăsinescu (yellow card) 25'; Bădic (yellow card) 45+1'; Panțîru 47'; Cioinac (yellow card) 52'; Sin (yellow card) 80'; Qaka (yellow card) 83'		Bălașa (yellow card) 52'; Man (yellow card) 79'	Stadium: Emil Alexandrescu; Attendance: 12,000; Referee: Marcel Bîrsan; Assistant referees: Mircea Orbuleț, Valentin Avram; Fourth official: Florin Andrei

26 November 2017 Round 19	Astra Giurgiu	2–0	Steaua București	Giurgiu
20:45 EET (UTC+02)	Ioniță 64' (pen.); Stan (yellow card) 72' (yellow-red card) 90+4'; Abang 81'		Coman (yellow card) 88'	Stadium: Marin Anastasovici; Attendance: 4,500; Referee: Horațiu Feșnic; Assistant referees: Alexandru Cerei, Ciprian Danşa; Fourth official: Ionuţ Coza

3 December 2017 Round 20	Steaua București	4–0	Juventus București	Bucharest
20:45 EET (UTC+02)	Fl. Tănase 54', 78', (yellow card) 71'; Gnohéré 80'; Budescu 90+1'			Stadium: Arena Națională; Attendance: 1,500; Referee: Horia Mladinovici; Assistant referees: Vasile Marinescu, Daniel Hulubei; Fourth official: Alexandru Tudor

10 December 2017 Round 21	Botoșani	0–3	Steaua București	Botoșani
20:00 EET (UTC+02)	Tincu (yellow card) 23'		Gnohéré 45+1'; Filip (yellow card) 51'; Man 58'; Enache (yellow card) 66'; Niță (yellow card) 89'; Fl. Tănase 90+3'	Stadium: Municipal; Attendance: 5,000; Referee: Marius Avram; Assistant referees: Vladimir Urzică, Mihai Marius Marica; Fourth official: Dragoș Istrate

17 December 2017 Round 22	Steaua București	2–0	Viitorul Constanța	Bucharest
20:00 EET (UTC+02)	Man 20'; Coman (yellow card) 34'; Gnohéré (red card) 43'; Momčilović 65'; Júnior Morais (yellow card) 66'; Filip (yellow card) 88'		Cicâldău (yellow card) 68'; T. Băluță (yellow card) 77'; Țucudean (yellow card) 85'	Stadium: Arena Națională; Attendance: 3,350; Referee: Sebastian Colțescu; Assistant referees: Radu Ghinguleac, Daniel Mitruți; Fourth official: Lucian Rusandu

3 February 2018 Round 23	Gaz Metan Mediaș	1–2	Steaua București	Mediaș
20:45 EET (UTC+02)	Sîrghi (yellow card) 51'; Larie 79' (o.g.); Constantin (yellow card) 90+4'		Budescu 25', (yellow card) 59'; Alibec 62'; Larie (yellow card) 68'; Alibec (yellow card) 75'; Teixeira (yellow card) 76'; Momčilović (yellow card) 85'	Stadium: Gaz Metan; Attendance: 4,000; Referee: Adrian Comănescu; Assistant referees: Dragoş Iliescu, Mihai Marica; Fourth official: Marian Balaci

10 February 2018 Round 24	Steaua București	1–1	CFR Cluj	Bucharest
20:45 EET (UTC+02)	Budescu 76' (pen.)		Mailat (yellow card) 20'; Vinícius 33'; Hoban (yellow card) 80'	Stadium: Arena Națională; Attendance: 11,874; Referee: Marcel Bîrsan; Assistant referees: Valentin Avram, Mircea Grigoriu; Fourth official: Iulian Călin

18 February 2018 Round 25	Dinamo București	2–2	Steaua București	Bucharest
20:45 EET (UTC+02)	Romera (yellow card) 14'; Pešić 20'; Nemec (yellow card) 45'; Salomão (yellow card) 55'; Torje 57'		Tănase (yellow card) 37'; Planić (yellow card) 48'; Man 84'; Teixeira 90+3'	Stadium: Arena Națională; Attendance: 24,726; Referee: Marius Avram; Assistant referees: Radu Ghinguleac, Mircea Orbuleț; Fourth official: Adrian Comănescu

25 February 2018 Round 26	Steaua București	2–0	Sepsi Sfântu Gheorghe	Bucharest
EET (UTC+02)	Viera 51' (o.g.); Man 86'		Gorrin (yellow card) 40'	Stadium: Arena Națională; Attendance: 1,000; Referee: Iulian Călin; Assistant referees: George Neacşu, Mihai Marica; Fourth official: Horia Mladinovici

==== Championship round ====
Overall								Home						Away					
Pld	W	D	L	GF	GA	GD	Pts	W	D	L	GF	GA	GD	W	D	L	GF	GA	GD
10	6	3	1	14	6	+8	21	4	1	0	7	2	+5	2	2	1	7	4	+3

Source: FCSB

===== Table =====
Pos	Team	Pld	W	D	L	GF	GA	GD	Pts	Qualification
1	CFR Cluj (C)	10	5	5	0	12	6	+6	50	Qualification for the Champions League second qualifying round
2	FCSB	10	6	3	1	14	6	+8	49	Qualification for the Europa League second qualifying round
3	Universitatea Craiova	10	3	3	4	10	10	0	38	Qualification for the Europa League third qualifying round (Note: Universitatea Craiova qualified for the Europa League third qualifying round by winning the 2017–18 Cupa României.)
4	Viitorul Constanța	10	3	4	3	13	11	+2	35	Qualification for the Europa League first qualifying round
5	Astra Giurgiu	10	3	2	5	9	11	−2	33	
6	CSM Politehnica Iași	10	1	1	8	5	19	−14	24	

Source: Soccerway, Romanian Football Federation
Rules for classification: 1) Points; 2) Points without rounding; 3) Head-to-head points; 4) Head-to-head goal difference; 5) Head-to-head goals scored; 6) Goal difference; 7) Goals scored; 8) Play-off (only if needed to decide champion or teams for UEFA competitions). (Note: only criteria 6 and 7 are applied to establish the classification during the competition.)
(C) Champions

===== Position by round =====
Round	1	2	3	4	5	6	7	8	9	10
Ground	H	A	H	H	A	A	H	A	A	H
Result	W	D	W	W	W	D	D	L	W	W
Position	2	2	1	1	1	1	1	2	2	2

Source: Matches
A = Away; H = Home; W = Win; D = Draw; L = Loss

===== Results =====
11 March 2018 Round 1	Steaua București	2–1	Viitorul Constanța	Bucharest
20:45 EET (UTC+02)	Man (yellow card) 29'; Budescu 32'; Momčilović 39'; Nedelcu (yellow card) 64'		Mladen 75'; Ianis Hagi (yellow card) 82'	Stadium: Arena Națională; Attendance: 8,753; Referee: István Kovács; Assistant referees: Vasile Marinescu, Ovidiu Artene; Fourth official: Iulian Dima

18 March 2018 Round 2	CFR Cluj	1–1	Steaua București	Cluj-Napoca
20:45 EET (UTC+02)	Peteleu (yellow card) 31' (yellow-red card) 64'; Culio 38' (pen.); Mureșan (yellow card) 54'; Vâtcă (yellow card) 59'; Hoban (yellow card) 89'; Arlauskis (yellow card) 90+1'		Benzar (yellow card) 57'; Pintilii (red card) 73'; Alibec (yellow card) 74'; Planić (yellow card) 79'; Bălgrădean (yellow card) 80'; Gnohéré 90+1'	Stadium: Dr. Constantin Rădulescu; Attendance: 18,000; Referee: Ovidiu Hațegan; Assistant referees: Octavian Șovre, Sebastian Gheorghe; Fourth official: Robert Dumitru

1 April 2018 Round 3	Steaua București	1–0	CSM Politehnica Iași	Bucharest
20:45 EET (UTC+02)	Nedelcu (yellow card) 45'; Teixeira (yellow card) 55'; Popescu (yellow card) 66'; Budescu 71'; Coman (yellow card) 74'; Gnohéré (yellow card) 90+5'		Mendes (yellow card) 4'; Chelaru (yellow card) 17'; Jô Santos (yellow card) 19'; Cioinac (yellow card) 60' (yellow-red card) 69'; Gabriel Bosoi (yellow card) 69'; Andrei Cristea (yellow card) 88'	Stadium: Arena Națională; Attendance: 5,000; Referee: Adrian Comănescu; Assistant referees: Marius Nicoară, Mihai Marica; Fourth official: Cătălin Buși

9 April 2018 Round 4	Steaua București	2–0	Universitatea Craiova	Bucharest
20:45 EET (UTC+02)	Momčilović 6'; Popescu (yellow card) 28'; Budescu (yellow card) 36'; Tănase 51' (pen.); Man (yellow card) 72'		Mateiu (yellow card) 69'; Băluță (yellow card) 72'	Stadium: Arena Națională; Attendance: 22,790; Referee: István Kovács; Assistant referees: Vasile Marinescu, Ovidiu Artene; Fourth official: Florin Mazilu

16 April 2018 Round 5	Astra Giurgiu	0–3	Steaua București	Giurgiu
20:45 EET (UTC+02)	Stan (yellow card) 37'		Budescu (yellow card) 7'; Gnohéré 27' (pen.); Man 47'; Pintilii 49'	Stadium: Marin Anastasovici; Attendance: 4,500; Referee: Marius Avram; Assistant referees: Mircea Orbuleț, Vladimir Urzică; Fourth official: Marcel Bârsan

21 April 2018 Round 6	Viitorul Constanța	2–2	Steaua București	Ovidiu
20:45 EET (UTC+02)	Vînă 19'; Țîru (yellow card) 20'; Mladen (yellow card) 28'; Gavra 36'		Benzar (yellow card) 35'; Man 45'; Budescui 56'; Pintilii (yellow card) 62'; Planić (yellow card) 83'	Stadium: Viitorul; Attendance: 4,500; Referee: Marcel Bîrsan; Assistant referees: Adrian Radu Ghinguleac, Marius Nicoară; Fourth official: Adrian Comănescu

29 April 2018 Round 7	Steaua București	1–1	CFR Cluj	Bucharest
20:45 EET (UTC+02)	Pintilii (yellow card) 36'; Benzar (yellow card) 70'; Planić 90+1'; Momčilović (yellow card) 90+6'		Vinícius (yellow card) 15'; Omrani (yellow card) 70'; Djoković 76'; Manea (yellow card) 90'	Stadium: Arena Națională; Attendance: 30,000; Referee: István Kovács; Assistant referees: Octavian Șovre, Valentin Avram; Fourth official: Cătălin Popa

7 May 2018 Round 8	CSM Politehnica Iași	1–0	Steaua București	Iași
20:45 EET (UTC+02)	Qaka (yellow card) 18' (yellow-red card) 74'; Mihalache (yellow card) 55'; Cioinac (yellow card) 77'; Jô (yellow card) 85'; Cristea 89'; Frăsinescu (yellow card) 90+3'		Alibec (yellow card) 21'; Bălașa (yellow card) 58'; Tănase (yellow card) 61'; Filip (yellow card) 72'	Stadium: Emil Alexandrescu; Attendance: 13,000; Referee: Radu Petrescu; Assistant referees: Adrian Radu Ghinguleac, Sebastian Gheorghe; Fourth official: Andrei Antonie

14 May 2018 Round 9	Universitatea Craiova	0–1	Steaua București	Craiova
20:45 EET (UTC+02)	Băluță (yellow card) 26'; Popa (yellow card) 45'; Bancu (yellow card) 52'; Ferreira (yellow card) 55'; Zlatinski (yellow card) 56'; Kelić (yellow card) 90+6'		Popescu (yellow card) 31'; Coman (yellow card) 35'; Morais (yellow card) 64' (yellow-red card) 90+6'; Teixeira (yellow card) 74'; Teixeira 86'; Pintilii (red card) 90+1'; Tănase (yellow card) 90+6'; Bălgrădean (yellow card) 90+7'	Stadium: Ion Oblemenco; Attendance: 29,000; Referee: Ovidiu Hațegan; Assistant referees: Octavian Șovre, Valentin Avram; Fourth official: Iulian Dima

20 May 2018 Round 10	Steaua București	1–0	Astra Giurgiu	Bucharest
20:45 EET (UTC+02)	Coman (yellow card) 16'; Budescu (yellow card) 29'; Gnohéré 40'		Vera (yellow card) 19'; Erico (yellow card) 66'	Stadium: Arena Națională; Attendance: 16,000; Referee: Marius Avram; Assistant referees: Vladimir Urzică, Sebastian Gheorghe; Fourth official: Horia Gabriel Mladinovici

=== Cupa României ===
==== Results ====
25 October 2017 Round of 32	Sănătatea Cluj	1–6	Steaua București	Cluj-Napoca
20:30 EET (UTC+02)	Paul (red card) 22'; Matei (yellow card) 71'; Yuh (yellow card) 77'; Negru 84'		Man 17', 23' (pen.); D. Benzar 32'; William 45'; Achim 58'; Pacionel (yellow card) 76'; Ardelean (yellow card) 78'; Stoica 90+2'	Stadium: Cluj Arena; Attendance: 4,500; Referee: Florin Andrei; Assistant referees: Radu Timar, Ovidiu Timar

30 November 2017 Round of 16	Poli Timișoara	0–3	Steaua București	Timișoara
21:30 EET (UTC+02)	Ciucur (yellow card) 51'; Artean (yellow card) 81' (red card) 81'; Bocșan (yellow card) 90'; Vașvari (yellow card) 90+2'		M. Mihai (yellow card) 21'; Gnohéré 34' (pen.); Golofca (yellow card) 25', (goal) 55'; D. Benzar 90+2'	Stadium: Dan Păltinișanu; Attendance: 4,000; Referee: Ovidiu Hațegan; Assistant referees: Octavian Șovre, Dragoș Iliescu; Fourth official: Marian Barbu

1 March 2018 Quarter-finals	Hermannstadt	3–0	Steaua București	Sibiu
18:30 EET (UTC+02)	Rusu 11', 62'; Blănaru 29'; Blănaru (yellow card) 29'; Petrescu (yellow card) 49'; Pârvulescu (yellow card) 81'; Danci (yellow card) 89'		Fl. Tănase (yellow card) 30'; Bălașa (yellow card) 52'; Popescu (yellow card) 70' (yellow-red card) 73'	Stadium: Municipal; Attendance: 10,000; Referee: Cătălin Popa; Assistant referees: Daniel Mitruți, Gabriel Stroe; Fourth official: Lucian Rusandu

=== UEFA Champions League ===
==== Qualifying rounds ====
===== Third qualifying round =====
25 July 2017 First leg	Steaua București (Romania)	2–2	(Czech Republic) Viktoria Plzeň	Bucharest, Romania
20:30 EET (UTC+02)	Budescu 37'; Pintilii (yellow card) 47'; Alibec (yellow card) 52'; Teixeira 61'; Gnohéré (yellow card) 79'	Report	Krmenčík 23', (yellow card) 38'; Petržela (yellow card) 26'; Hájek (yellow card) 36'; Havel (yellow card) 44'; Kopic 53', (yellow card) 90+1'	Stadium: Arena Națională; Attendance: 33,795; Referee: Əliyar Ağayev (Azerbaijan); Assistant referees: Zeynal Zeynalov, Rza Məmmədov; Fourth official: Orxan Məmmədov

2 August 2017 Second leg	Viktoria Plzeň (Czech Republic)	1–4 (3–6 agg.)	(Romania) Steaua București	Plzeň, Czech Republic
21:15 EET (UTC+02)	Petržela (yellow card) 24'; Řezník (yellow card) 26'; Živulić (yellow card) 39'; Havel (yellow card) 48'; Krmenčík (yellow card) 61' (red card) 89', (goal) 65'; Hrošovský (yellow card) 72'; Bolek (yellow card) 79'; Bakoš (yellow card) 83'	Report	Bălașa 27', (yellow card) 67'; O. Popescu (yellow card) 50'; Teixeira 71'; Fl. Tănase 76'; Alibec 79' (pen.), (yellow card) 84'	Stadium: Doosan Arena; Attendance: 10,802; Referee: Alejandro Hernández (Spain); Assistant referees: Teodoro Sobrino, José Naranjo; Fourth official: Ricardo de Burgos Bengoetxea

===== Play-off round =====
15 August 2017 First leg	Sporting CP (Portugal)	0–0	(Romania) Steaua București	Lisbon, Portugal
21:45 EET (UTC+02)	Piccini (yellow card) 56'; Acuña (yellow card) 63'; Battaglia (yellow card) 82'; Fernandes (yellow card) 84'; Doumbia (yellow card) 86'	Report	Pintilii (yellow card) 32' (yellow-red card) 80'; Fl. Tănase (yellow card) 64'; O. Popescu (yellow card) 70'; Larie (yellow card) 88'	Stadium: José Alvalade; Attendance: 46,678; Referee: Felix Brych (Germany); Assistant referees: Mark Borsch, Stefan Lupp; Fourth official: Christian Gittelmann; Goal-line assistants: Bastian Dankert, Marco Fritz

23 August 2017 Second leg	Steaua București (Romania)	1–5 (1–5 agg.)	(Portugal) Sporting CP	Bucharest, Romania
21:45 EET (UTC+02)	Júnior Morais 20'; O. Popescu (yellow card) 35'; Filip (yellow card) 41'	Report	Doumbia 13'; Fernandes (yellow card) 35'; Acuña 60'; Martins 64'; Dost 75'; Battaglia 88'	Stadium: Arena Națională; Attendance: 49,220; Referee: Cüneyt Çakır (Turkey); Assistant referees: Bahattin Duran, Tarik Ongun; Fourth official: Esat Sancaktar; Goal-line assistants: Hüseyin Göçek, Barış Şimşek

=== UEFA Europa League ===
==== Group stage ====
Pos	Team	Pld	W	D	L	GF	GA	GD	Pts	Qualification	PLZ	FCSB	LUG	HBS
1	(Czech Republic) Viktoria Plzeň	6	4	0	2	13	8	+5	12	Advance to knockout phase	—	2–0	4–1	3–1
2	(Romania) FCSB	6	3	1	2	9	7	+2	10	Advance to knockout phase	3–0	—	1–2	1–1
3	(Switzerland) Lugano	6	3	0	3	9	11	−2	9		3–2	1–2	—	1–0
4	(Israel) Hapoel Be'er Sheva	6	1	1	4	5	10	−5	4		0–2	1–2	2–1	—

Source: UEFA
Rules for classification: Group stage tiebreakers

===== Results =====
14 September 2017 Round 1	Steaua București (Romania)	3–0	(Czech Republic) Viktoria Plzeň	Bucharest, Romania
22:05 EET (UTC+02)	Budescu 21' (pen.), 44', (yellow card) 55'; Alibec 72'	Report	Hrošovský (yellow card) 34'; Bakoš (yellow card) 90+3'	Stadium: Arena Națională; Attendance: 20,714; Referee: Andris Treimanis (Latvia); Assistant referees: Haralds Gudermanis, Aleksejs Spasjonnikovs; Fourth official: Raimonds Tatriks; Goal-line assistants: Aleksandrs Golubevs, Edgars Malcevs

28 September 2017 Round 2	Lugano (Switzerland)	1–2	(Romania) Steaua București	Lucerne, Switzerland
20:00 EET (UTC+02)	Bottani 14'; Daprelà (yellow card) 15'; Mihajlović (yellow card) 85'; Bnou-Marzouk (yellow card) 90+2'	Report	Pintilii (yellow card) 52'; Budescu 58'; Júnior Morais 64'	Stadium: Swissporarena; Attendance: 2,680; Referee: Serhiy Boyko (Ukraine); Assistant referees: Oleg Pluzhnyk, Volodymyr Volodin; Fourth official: Oleksandr Korniyko; Goal-line assistants: Mykola Balakin, Oleksandr Derdo

19 October 2017 Round 3	Hapoel Be'er Sheva (Israel)	1–2	(Romania) Steaua București	Be'er Sheva, Israel
20:00 EET (UTC+02)	Cuenca 87'; Melikson (yellow card) 90'; Elhamed (yellow card) 90+1'	Report	Fl. Tănase (yellow card) 51'; Teixeira (yellow card) 61'; Gnohéré 70', 75'; Coman (yellow card) 71'; Budescu (yellow card) 90+2'; O. Popescu (yellow card) 90+4'	Stadium: Turner Stadium; Attendance: 15,117; Referee: Kevin Blom (Netherlands); Assistant referees: Charles Schaap, Joost van Zuilen; Fourth official: Bas van Dongen; Goal-line assistants: Kamphuis Jochem, Jeroen Manschot

2 November 2017 Round 4	Steaua București (Romania)	1–1	(Israel) Hapoel Be'er Sheva	Bucharest, Romania
22:05 EET (UTC+02)	Coman 31'; Man (yellow card) 45'; Pintilii (yellow card) 83'; Bălașa (yellow card) 90'	Report	Elo (yellow card) 6'; Vitor (yellow card) 15'; Nwakaeme (yellow card) 25'; Radi (yellow card) 36'; Sahar 37'; Taha (yellow card) 73'	Stadium: Arena Națională; Attendance: 27,134; Referee: Halis Özkahya (Turkey); Assistant referees: Çem Satman, Ekrem Kan; Fourth official: Kerem Ersoy; Goal-line assistants: Ali Palabıyık, Yasar Kemal Ugurlu

23 November 2017 Round 5	Viktoria Plzeň (Czech Republic)	2–0	(Romania) Steaua București	Plzeň, Czech Republic
20:00 EET (UTC+02)	Petržela 49'; Kopic 76'	Report	Man (yellow card) 45+1'; Enache (yellow card) 67'; Budescu (yellow card) 84'	Stadium: Doosan Arena; Attendance: 10,197; Referee: Ivan Bebek (Croatia); Assistant referees: Goran Patak, Miro Grgić; Fourth official: Ivica Modrić; Goal-line assistants: Mario Zebec, Goran Gabrilo

7 December 2017 Round 6	Steaua București (Romania)	1–2	(Switzerland) Lugano	Bucharest, Romania
22:05 EET (UTC+02)	Gnohéré 60'; Bălașa (yellow card) 71'; Nedelcu (yellow card) 72'	Report	Daprelà 3'; Vécsei 32'; Kovačič (yellow card) 35'; Da Costa (yellow card) 89'	Stadium: Arena Națională; Attendance: 13,231; Referee: Nikola Dabanović (Montenegro); Assistant referees: Milovan Djukić, Jovica Tatar; Fourth official: Vladan Todorović; Goal-line assistants: Miloš Bošković, Miloš Savović

==== Knockout phase ====
===== Round of 32 =====
15 February 2018 First leg	Steaua București (Romania)	1–0	(Italy) Lazio	Bucharest, Romania
22:05 EET (UTC+02)	Pintilii (yellow card) 26'; Gnohéré 29'; Vlad (yellow card) 64'; Găman (yellow card) 78'	Report	Milinković-Savić (yellow card) 9'; Cáceres (yellow card) 45+1'; Luiz Felipe (yellow card) 52'; Immobile (yellow card) 90+1'	Stadium: Arena Națională; Attendance: 33,455; Referee: Deniz Aytekin (Germany); Assistant referees: Eduard Beitinger, Rafael Foltyn; Fourth official: Marco Achmuller; Goal-line assistants: Daniel Siebert, Benjamin Brand

22 February 2018 Second leg	Lazio (Italy)	5–1 (5–2 agg.)	(Romania) Steaua București	Rome, Italy
20:00 EET (UTC+02)	Immobile 7', 42', 71'; Basta (yellow card) 30'; Immobile (yellow card) 33'; Bastos 35'; Anderson 51'	Report	Gnohéré 82'	Stadium: Stadio Olimpico; Attendance: 27,597; Referee: Slavko Vinčić (Slovenia); Assistant referees: Tomaž Klančnik, Andraž Kovačič; Fourth official: Grega Kordež; Goal-line assistants: Rade Obrenovic, Roberto Ponis

== Statistics ==
=== Appearances and goals ===
As of 20 May 2018

No.	Pos	Player	Liga I		Cupa României		Champions League		Europa League		Total	
No.	Pos	Player	Apps	Goals	Apps	Goals	Apps	Goals	Apps	Goals	Apps	Goals
2	DF	(Romania) Romario Benzar	19	1	0	0	0	0	5	0	24	1
3	DF	(Romania) Ionuț Larie	15	1	3	0	4	0	2	0	24	1
4	DF	(Romania) Mihai Bălașa	23	0	1	0	2	0	7	0	33	0
5	MF	(Romania) Mihai Pintilii	26	1	0	0	3	0	4	0	33	1
6	MF	(Romania) Dragoș Nedelcu	18	1	2	0	0	0	6	0	26	1
7	FW	(Romania) Denis Alibec	20	1	0	0	4	1	3	1	27	3
8	MF	(Romania) Lucian Filip	14	0	1	0	1	0	4	0	20	0
9	FW	(France) Harlem Gnohéré	31	15	2	1	4	0	7	5	44	21
10	FW	(Romania) Florin Tănase	33	10	1	0	4	1	7	0	45	11
11	FW	(Romania) Constantin Budescu	27	9	1	0	2	1	7	3	37	13
12	DF	(Brazil) Júnior Morais	21	0	0	0	4	1	7	1	32	2
15	DF	(Serbia) Marko Momčilović	28	3	0	0	4	0	2	0	34	3
16	DF	(Serbia) Bogdan Planić	22	1	0	0	0	0	6	0	28	1
17	FW	(Romania) Florinel Coman	20	3	2	0	0	0	8	1	30	4
19	DF	(Portugal) Artur Jorge	1	0	3	0	0	0	0	0	4	0
23	MF	(Romania) Ovidiu Popescu	24	0	1	0	3	0	5	0	33	0
25	DF	(Romania) Valerică Găman	5	0	0	0	0	0	2	0	7	0
30	MF	(Romania) Cristian Tănase	8	0	0	0	0	0	1	0	9	0
33	GK	(Romania) Eduard Stăncioiu	0	0	0	0	0	0	0	0	0	0
34	GK	(Romania) Cristian Bălgrădean	10	0	1	0	0	0	0	0	11	0
80	MF	(Portugal) Filipe Teixeira	27	3	0	0	4	2	5	0	36	5
98	FW	(Romania) Dennis Man	34	10	3	2	2	0	8	0	47	12
99	GK	(Romania) Andrei Vlad	5	0	2	0	0	0	4	0	11	0
Players from Steaua II
21	MF	(Romania) Ianis Stoica	0	0	3	1	0	0	0	0	3	1
28	MF	(Romania) Mario Mihai	0	0	2	0	0	0	0	0	2	0
—	MF	(Romania) Emilian Pacionel	0	0	1	0	0	0	0	0	1	0
—	MF	(Romania) Laurențiu Ardelean	0	0	1	0	0	0	0	0	1	0
—	DF	(Romania) Alexandru Nicola	0	0	0	0	0	0	0	0	0	0
Players transferred out during the season
1	GK	(Romania) Florin Niță	21	0	0	0	4	0	4	0	29	0
18	MF	(Romania) Vlad Mihalcea	0	0	0	0	0	0	0	0	0	0
13	DF	(Romania) Marian Pleașcă	4	0	2	0	0	0	0	0	6	0
20	MF	(Romania) Vlad Achim	6	0	2	1	3	0	0	0	11	1
22	FW	(Romania) Cătălin Golofca	8	0	2	1	2	0	3	0	15	1
24	MF	(Romania) Paul Szecui	0	0	1	0	0	0	0	0	1	0
26	FW	(Romania) Daniel Benzar	10	2	2	2	0	0	0	0	12	4
27	FW	(Romania) Robert Grecu	2	0	0	0	0	0	0	0	2	0
29	MF	(Brazil) William De Amorim	7	1	2	1	2	0	1	0	12	2
44	MF	(Romania) Gabriel Enache	15	0	0	0	4	0	4	0	23	0

=== Squad statistics ===
	Liga I	Cupa României	Champions League	Europa League	Home	Away	Total Stats
Games played	36	3	4	8	24	27	51
Games won	22	2	1	4	16	13	29
Games drawn	10	0	2	1	7	6	13
Games lost	4	1	1	3	2	7	9
Goals scored	66	9	7	11	46	47	93
Goals conceded	24	4	8	12	18	30	48
Goal difference	+42	+5	-1	-1	+28	+17	+45
Clean sheets	16	1	1	2	12	8	20
Goal by Substitute	12	1	0	3	6	10	16
Total shots	–	–	–	–	–	–	–
Shots on target	–	–	–	–	–	–	–
Corners	–	–	–	–	–	–	–
Players used	–	–	–	–	–	–	–
Offsides	–	–	–	–	–	–	–
Fouls suffered	–	–	–	–	–	–	–
Fouls committed	–	–	–	–	–	–	–
Yellow cards	95	6	11	18	55	75	130
Red cards	3	1	1	0	1	4	5
Winning rate	61.11%	66.67%	25%	50%	66.67%	48.15%	56.86%

Last updated: 20 May 2018
Source: Competitive matches

=== Goalscorers ===
As of 20 May 2018

Rank	Position	Name	Liga I	Cupa României	Champions League	Europa League	Total
1	FW	(France) Harlem Gnohéré	15	1	0	5	21
2	FW	(Romania) Constantin Budescu	9	0	1	3	13
3	FW	(Romania) Dennis Man	10	2	0	0	12
4	FW	(Romania) Florin Tănase	10	0	1	0	11
5	MF	(Portugal) Filipe Teixeira	3	0	2	0	5
6	DF	(Serbia) Marko Momčilović	4	0	0	0	4
6	FW	(Romania) Florinel Coman	3	0	0	1	4
6	FW	(Romania) Daniel Benzar	2	2	0	0	4
9	FW	(Romania) Denis Alibec	1	0	1	1	3
10	MF	(Brazil) William De Amorim	1	1	0	0	2
10	DF	(Brazil) Júnior Morais	0	0	1	1	2
12	DF	(Romania) Romario Benzar	1	0	0	0	1
12	DF	(Romania) Ionuț Larie	1	0	0	0	1
12	MF	(Romania) Dragoș Nedelcu	1	0	0	0	1
12	MF	(Romania) Mihai Pintilii	1	0	0	0	1
12	DF	(Serbia) Bogdan Planić	1	0	0	0	1
12	MF	(Romania) Vlad Achim	0	1	0	0	1
12	MF	(Romania) Ianis Stoica	0	1	0	0	1
12	FW	(Romania) Cătălin Golofca	0	1	0	0	1
12	DF	(Romania) Mihai Bălașa	0	0	1	0	1
Own goal			3	0	0	0	3
Total			66	9	7	11	93

=== Goal minutes ===
	1'–15'	16'–30'	31'–HT	46'–60'	61'–75'	76'–FT	Extra time	Forfeit
Goals	4	13	21	16	19	20	0	0
Percentage	4.3%	13.98%	22.58%	17.2%	20.43%	21.51%	0%	0%

Last updated: 20 May 2018 (UTC)
Source: FCSB (in Romanian)

=== Hat-tricks ===
Player	Against	Result	Date	Competition
(France) Gnohéré	(Romania) Poli Timișoara	7–0 (H)	22 October 2017	Liga I

(H) – Home; (A) – Away

=== Clean sheets ===
As of 20 May 2018

Rank	Name	Liga I	Cupa României	Champions League	Europa League	Total	Games played
1	(Romania) Florin Niță^{1}	10	0	1	1	12	29
2	(Romania) Cristian Bălgrădean	5	0	0	0	5	11
3	(Romania) Andrei Vlad	1	1	0	1	3	11
Total		16	1	1	2	20	51

^{1} Florin Niță was transferred to Sparta Prague during the winter transfer window.

=== Disciplinary record ===
As of 20 May 2018

Rank	Position	Name	Liga I			Cupa României			Champions League			Europa League			Total		
Rank	Position	Name	Booked	(yellow card) (yellow-red card)	Sent off (straight red)	Booked	(yellow card) (yellow-red card)	Sent off (straight red)	Booked	(yellow card) (yellow-red card)	Sent off (straight red)	Booked	(yellow card) (yellow-red card)	Sent off (straight red)	Booked	(yellow card) (yellow-red card)	Sent off (straight red)
1	MF	(Romania) Mihai Pintilii	7	0	2	1	0	0	1	1	0	3	0	0	12	1	2
2	MF	(Romania) Ovidiu Popescu	7	0	0	0	1	0	3	0	0	1	0	0	11	1	0
3	FW	(Romania) Constantin Budescu	6	0	0	0	0	0	0	0	0	3	0	0	9	0	0
3	DF	(Romania) Mihai Bălașa	5	0	0	1	0	0	1	0	0	2	0	0	9	0	0
5	FW	(Romania) Denis Alibec	6	0	0	0	0	0	2	0	0	0	0	0	8	0	0
5	FW	(Romania) Dennis Man	6	0	0	0	0	0	0	0	0	2	0	0	8	0	0
7	FW	(France) Harlem Gnohéré	5	0	1	0	0	0	1	0	0	0	0	0	6	0	1
7	FW	(Romania) Florinel Coman	6	0	0	0	0	0	0	0	0	1	0	0	7	0	0
7	FW	(Romania) Florin Tănase	4	0	0	1	0	0	1	0	0	1	0	0	7	0	0
10	DF	(Romania) Romario Benzar	6	0	0	0	0	0	0	0	0	0	0	0	6	0	0
10	MF	(Portugal) Filipe Teixeira	5	0	0	0	0	0	0	0	0	1	0	0	6	0	0
12	DF	(Romania) Ionuț Larie	5	0	0	0	0	0	0	0	0	0	0	0	5	0	0
12	DF	(Serbia) Bogdan Planić	5	0	0	0	0	0	0	0	0	0	0	0	5	0	0
12	MF	(Romania) Lucian Filip	4	0	0	0	0	0	1	0	0	0	0	0	5	0	0
15	DF	(Brazil) Júnior Morais	3	1	0	0	0	0	0	0	0	0	0	0	3	1	0
15	MF	(Romania) Dragoș Nedelcu	3	0	0	0	0	0	0	0	0	1	0	0	4	0	0
17	DF	(Serbia) Marko Momčilović	2	0	0	0	0	0	1	0	0	0	0	0	3	0	0
18	GK	(Romania) Florin Niță	2	0	0	0	0	0	0	0	0	0	0	0	2	0	0
18	MF	(Romania) Cristian Tănase	2	0	0	0	0	0	0	0	0	0	0	0	2	0	0
18	GK	(Romania) Cristian Bălgrădean	2	0	0	0	0	0	0	0	0	0	0	0	2	0	0
18	DF	(Romania) Gabriel Enache	1	0	0	0	0	0	0	0	0	1	0	0	2	0	0
22	GK	(Romania) Eduard Stăncioiu	1	0	0	0	0	0	0	0	0	0	0	0	1	0	0
22	FW	(Romania) Daniel Benzar	1	0	0	0	0	0	0	0	0	0	0	0	1	0	0
22	MF	(Romania) Vlad Achim	1	0	0	0	0	0	0	0	0	0	0	0	1	0	0
22	MF	(Romania) Mario Mihai	0	0	0	1	0	0	0	0	0	0	0	0	1	0	0
22	MF	(Romania) Emilian Pacionel	0	0	0	1	0	0	0	0	0	0	0	0	1	0	0
22	DF	(Romania) Laurențiu Ardelean	0	0	0	1	0	0	0	0	0	0	0	0	1	0	0
22	GK	(Romania) Andrei Vlad	0	0	0	0	0	0	0	0	0	1	0	0	1	0	0
22	DF	(Romania) Valerică Găman	0	0	0	0	0	0	0	0	0	1	0	0	1	0	0
Total			95	1	2	6	1	0	11	1	0	18	0	0	130	2	3

=== Attendances ===
As of match played 20 May 2018

	Matches	Attendances	Average	High	Low
Liga I	18	178,500	9,917	30,000	1,000
Cupa României	0	0	0	0	0
Champions League	2	83,015	41,508	49,220	33,795
Europa League	4	94,534	23,634	33,455	13,231
Total	24	356,049	14,835	49,220	1,000

== Awards ==
=== Digi Sport Liga I Player of the Month ===
Month	Player
October	(France) Harlem Gnohéré
December	(Romania) Florin Tănase

=== Romanian Footballer of the Year ===
Year	Winner
2017	Constantin Budescu

=== Liga I Foreign Player of the Year ===
Year	Winner
2017	(France) Harlem Gnohéré

=== Best Team of the Championship Play-offs ===
Position	Player
DF	(Serbia) Bogdan Planić
DF	(Serbia) Marko Momčilović
MF	(Romania) Constantin Budescu
FW	(France) Harlem Gnohéré

== See also ==
- 2017–18 Cupa României
- 2017–18 Liga I
- 2017–18 UEFA Champions League
- 2017–18 UEFA Europa League
