= Benzar =

Benzar may refer to the following:

- Romario Benzar (born 1992), Romanian footballer
- Daniel Benzar (born 1997), Romanian footballer
- Benzar, a Star Trek planet
