= Laurențiu Ardelean =

Romanian footballer

Personal information
- Full name: Laurențiu Constantin Ardelean
- Date of birth: 8 February 2001 (age 25)
- Place of birth: Bucharest, Romania
- Height: 1.82 m (6 ft 0 in)
- Position: Midfielder

Youth career
- 2010–2017: FCSB

Senior career*
Years	Team	Apps	(Gls)
2017–2023	FCSB	3	(0)
2021–2022	→ Unirea Constanța (loan)	39	(7)
2023	→ Afumați (loan)	10	(1)
2023–2026	Clinceni	72	(11)

International career
- Romania U16
- Romania U17
- * Club domestic league appearances and goals as of 14:48, 17 October 2026 (UTC)

Laurențiu Constantin Ardelean (born 8 February 2001) is a Romanian former footballer who played as a midfielder.

== Club career ==
Ardelean joined FCSB in 2010. On 25 October 2017, at the age of 16, Ardelean made his debut for the club in a 6–1 away win against Sănătatea Cluj in the Cupa României. On 11 August 2019, Ardelean made his Liga I debut for FCSB in a 3–1 loss against Voluntari.

== International career ==
Ardelean has represented Romania at under-16 and under-17 level.

== Career statistics ==
As of match played 3 December 2022

Appearances and goals by club, season and competition
Club	Season	League			Cupa României		Europe		Other		Total	
Club	Season	Division	Apps	Goals	Apps	Goals	Apps	Goals	Apps	Goals	Apps	Goals
FCSB	2017–18	Liga I	0	0	1	0	0	0	—		1	0
FCSB	2018–19	Liga I	0	0	0	0	0	0	—		0	0
FCSB	2019–20	Liga I	1	0	0	0	0	0	—		1	0
FCSB	2020–21	Liga I	2	0	0	0	0	0	0	0	2	0
FCSB	Total		3	0	1	0	0	0	0	0	4	0
FCSB II	2020–21	Liga III	2	0	—		—		—		2	0
Unirea Constanța (loan)	2021–22	Liga II	18	5	0	0	—		—		18	5
Unirea Constanța (loan)	2022–23	Liga II	11	2	1	0	—		—		12	2
Unirea Constanța (loan)	Total		29	7	1	0	—		—		30	7
Career total			34	7	2	0	0	0	0	0	36	7
