= Wesley (footballer, born 1980) =

Brazilian footballer (born 1980)

Personal information
- Full name: Wesley Lopes da Silva
- Date of birth: 10 November 1980 (age 46)
- Place of birth: Vila Velha, Brazil
- Height: 1.79 m (5 ft 10 in)
- Positions: Striker; second striker

Youth career
- Ponte Preta

Senior career*
Years	Team	Apps	(Gls)
1999–2003	Ponte Preta	67	(23)
2003	Fortaleza	9	(0)
2003–2005	Penafiel	61	(22)
2005–2008	Alavés	15	(1)
2006	→ Vitória (loan)	14	(2)
2006–2007	→ Grasshoppers (loan)	16	(1)
2007–2008	→ Paços Ferreira (loan)	22	(11)
2008–2009	Leixões	13	(7)
2009–2012	Vaslui	113	(61)
2012–2013	Al-Hilal	24	(17)
2014	Millonarios	12	(1)
2014−2015	Politehnica Iași	8	(3)
2015–2017	Ponte Preta	28	(11)
Total		402	(160)
- * Club domestic league appearances and goals

Wesley Lopes da Silva (born 10 November 1980), known mononymously as Wesley, is a Brazilian former professional footballer who played as a striker and second striker. Apart from his native country, he represented teams in Portugal, Spain, Switzerland, Romania, Saudi Arabia and Colombia.

Wesley spent the most successful part of his career with Romanian club Vaslui between 2009 and 2013, netting 61 times to become the Liga I top foreign goalscorer. He went on to add three more goals to his record with a later spell at Politehnica Iași, before being surpassed by compatriot Eric de Oliveira in 2020.

For his performances in the latter country, Wesley was twice named the league's Foreign Player of the Year. He won his only team trophy, the Crown Prince Cup, with Saudi Arabian team Al-Hilal in 2013.

== Career ==
Wesley joined Penafiel who were then playing in the Liga de Honra on 14 August 2003. He scored 9 goals in his first season alongside Roberto who scored 20 goals and Hamilton dos Santos Júnior who scored 9 goals. This helped Penafiel top win promotion by finishing in third place. In his second season, he was the fourth top-scorer of the Portuguese Liga. He crossed the border to join La Liga newcomer Deportivo Alavés in August 2005. Wesley returned to Portugal in 2007 joining Paços Ferreira. In the 2007/08 season, he scored 11 goals. Wesley has moved to Leixões for the 2008/09 season. On 24 November Wesley announced in a press conference that he would be moving to the Dubai club Al-Wahda at the end of December.

=== Vaslui ===
==== 2009 ====
Wesley completed his move to SC Vaslui on a two-and-a-half-year contract on 22 January 2009 for an undisclosed fee reported to be $1m, which set a new record for FC Vaslui and made him the most expensive footballer for the club.

On 6 February, he made his unofficial debut for FC Vaslui, in the friendly match against Standard Baku. At the end of Vaslui's winter training camp, Wesley was his team's top scorer, netting five goals in seven games.

On 27 February, Wesley capped his Liga I debut with a goal, scoring Vaslui's only goal from Nemanja Milisavljević's cross in a 1–1 away draw against Steaua București.

On 14 March, he scored Vaslui's first goal, from the penalty spot in a 3–0 away win against Gloria Bistriţa. One week later, he scored his third goal for FC Vaslui, in a 4–2 home league win against Farul Constanţa, counting his first goal on Municipal.

On 14 April, Wesley scored Vaslui's first goal from a scissor-kick following Nemanja Milisavljević's cross, in a cup match against Unirea Urziceni, helping his team to advance in the semi-finals for the first time. Four days later, during a two-minute stretch in the first half against Politehnica Timișoara, Vaslui came back from a two-goal deficit to win the match with 4–3, with Wesley scoring one of the goals.

On 11 June, he scored Vaslui's winning goal against Universitatea Craiova, helping his team finishing fifth in Liga I and securing its spot for UEFA Europa League, for the second year in a row.

He ended his first season in Romania, netting eight goals and providing one assist for SC Vaslui in all competitions.

==== 2009–2010 season ====
On 30 July 2009, Wesley capped his first appearance in European club competition, playing 90 full minutes, in the 2–0 home win against Omonia Nicosia.

On 6 August, he scored in the second leg against Omonia Nicosia from an 18-yard free kick, qualifying Vaslui in UEFA Europa League's play-off round.

On 16 August, he scored Vaslui's equalizer in the home league draw against FC Braşov. Four days later, he scored two goals in the first leg from the play-off round against AEK Athens. Vaslui went on winning with 2–1. However, Vaslui failed to qualify in the group stages, following a 3–0 away loss in the second leg.

On 30 August, Wesley scored the winning goal against arch rivals Politehnica Iaşi, eight minutes before the final whistle.

On 3 October, Wesley scored his team's first goal in Marius Lăcătuş's first competitive match as manager, in Vaslui's 3–1 home win over Astra Ploieşti.

On 16 October, he scored Vaslui's winning goal against former champions Unirea Urziceni, following Roberto Delgado's cross. It was also Vaslui's first win against Unirea Urziceni, from its history.

On 23 November, he scored Vaslui's second goal against CFR Cluj, helping his team winning its eighth match in a row, in all competitions.

On 13 December, Wesley scored Vaslui's last goal from 2009, in a 1–1 away draw against Dinamo București, taking his tally of goals in all competitions to 11. He also wore the captain's armband for the first time, due to the absence of regular club captain Bogdan Buhuş.

On 18 March 2010, he scored two goals in a 3–1 away league win against Politehnica Iaşi, helping his team winning the first away game since November.

On 3 April, Wesley scored his first Liga I hat-trick, against Unirea Alba Iulia, in a 3–0 victory.

On 15 April, he helped his team to qualify in the Romanian Cup final for the first time, scoring Vaslui's second, in the 4–0 victory against FC Braşov.

On 22 May, he scored his last goal of the season from the penalty spot, in the 2–0 home league victory against Dinamo București, taking his tally of goals to 12 in Liga I, and 17 in all competitions.

On 26 May, he captained his side in the Romanian Cup final, eventually lost by Vaslui at the penalty shootout. He was named in the Liga I Team of the Year for the 2009–10 season by TOP Gazeta.

==== 2010–2011 season ====
Wesley scored his first goal from the 2010–11 campaign on 6 August, in a 1–1 away league draw against Universitatea Cluj, coming off the bench in the seventy-sixth minute to score from the penalty spot.

On 13 September, he scored Vaslui's second goal in an emphatic 4–0 home league victory over Otelul Galaţi. Six days later, he scored against Dinamo București, in a 2–1 away victory. Later, one of these goals was taken away from Wesley and considered an own-goal.

On 22 September, he missed his spot kick in the penalty shoot-out, leading to a premature sent off to his team from the Romanian Cup.

On 26 November, he scored his fifth league goal in a 3–1 home win over Pandurii Târgu Jiu.

On 6 December, Wesley shared with Eric de Oliveira, the Foreign Player of The Year award from FRF at the Romanian Football Ceremony from Bucharest.

On 7 December, Wesley expressed his intention to leave Vaslui. Adrian Porumboiu confirmed one day later, that the player can leave to any club, for a substantial amount of cash. Later that month, both Steaua and CFR Cluj expressed their interest for the Brazilian player.

However, on 18 January, Wesley signed a new three-year deal with Vaslui.

On 28 February, Wesley came off the bench at the half-time and scored two goals against FCM Târgu Mureş, maintaining his team in the title chase.

On 9 April, he scored Vaslui's first, in a 2–0 home league win against Dinamo București.

On 27 April, he scored Vaslui's winning goal against Universitatea Craiova, from an 18-yard free-kick eight minutes before the final whistle.

On 15 May, he scored his last goal of the season, against Sportul Studenţesc, taking his tally of goals to 13 in Liga I, a personal record since he started playing for Vaslui. He ended third in Liga I with his team, for the second year in a row.

==== 2011–2012 season ====
On 4 August 2011, Wesley has been appointed captain, following Gabriel Cânu's long-term injury.

On 15 August, Wesley scored Vaslui's first goal against Concordia Chiajna in a 3–0 victory, which ended a four-game goalless streak for his team. However, he was substituted in the forty-second minute, due to an injury that forced him to miss the first leg of UEFA Europa League play-off match against Sparta Prague. He made his come-back in the second leg, leading his team to a historical qualification in the group stages of UEFA Europa League. It was also Wesley's 100th match played for Vaslui in all competitions.

On 11 September, he scored Vaslui's first goal against Dinamo București, in a 3–1 home league victory. It was also Wesley's fifth personal goal against Dinamo, in the last five games.

Four days later, Wesley scored two goals in the first match from the group stages of UEFA Europa League, in a 2–2 away draw against Lazio.

On 22 September, Wesley scored two goals against Voinţa Livezile in a Romanian Cup match, which ultimately handed Vaslui an 8–0 victory, while at the same time he managed to eclipse Valentin Badea as Vaslui's all-time leading goalscorer.

Three days later, he managed to equalize Demollari's record 36-goal tally in Liga I, scoring twice against Voinţa Sibiu.

On 3 October, he scored his second Liga I hat-trick against CS Mioveni, becoming Liga I's top foreign player goalscorer.

Wesley was sent off in a Europa League match against Sporting CP on 20 October, for hitting João Pereira with his forehead. He was punished with a four-match ban by UEFA, decision contested by SC Vaslui officials.

On 30 October, Wesley scored his season's second hat-trick in the 4–0 home league win against FCM Târgu Mureş.

On 8 December, he lifted the Foreign Player of the Year Award at the Fanatik Awards Ceremony.

On 19 December, Wesley also received the Liga I Foreign of The Year award from LPF and FRF at the Romanian Football Ceremony for the second year in a row.

On 22 December, Wesley also won Gazeta Sporturilor's Liga I Foreign Footballer of the Year Award, beating his teammate Adaílton.

On 3 January 2012, Wesley won ProSport's Foreign Player of the Year, counting his fourth award at this section in only one year.

On 15 March 2012, he helped his team to qualify in the Romanian Cup semi-finals, for the third time in the last four years, scoring twice against Oțelul Galați.

Four days later, he scored his season's third hat-trick against Ceahlăul Piatra Neamț, taking his tally of goals up to 26 in all competitions. He ended the season as the top goal scorer of Liga I with 27 goals. He was awarded the Liga I Golden Boot for his 27 goals.

== Career statistics ==
Appearances and goals by club, season and competition
Club	Season	League			National cup (Note: Includes Copa do Brasil, Taça de Portugal, Copa del Rey, Swiss Cup, Cupa României, Crown Prince Cup, Copa Colombia.)		League cup (Note: Includes Taça da Liga, Swiss League Cup, Cupa Ligii, King Cup, Superliga Colombiana.)		Continental		Total	
Club	Season	Division	Apps	Goals	Apps	Goals	Apps	Goals	Apps	Goals	Apps	Goals
Fortaleza	2003	Série A	9	0			–		–		9	0
Penafiel	2003–04	Segunda Liga	31	9	3	1	–		–		34	10
Penafiel	2004–05	Primeira Liga	30	13	2	1	–		–		32	14
Penafiel	Total		61	22	5	2	0	0	–		66	24
Deportivo Alavés	2005–06	La Liga	10	1	1	0	–		–		11	1
Deportivo Alavés	2006–07	Segunda División	5	0	4	2	–		–		9	2
Deportivo Alavés	Total		15	1	5	2	–		–		20	3
Vitória Guimarães (loan)	2005–06	Primeira Liga	14	2	2	0	–		–		16	2
Grasshoppers (loan)	2006–07	Swiss Super League	16	1	1	0	–		–		17	1
Paços Ferreira (loan)	2007–08	Primeira Liga	22	11	3	1	–		–		25	12
Leixões	2008–09	Primeira Liga	13	7	3	1	2	0	–		18	8
Vaslui	2008–09	Liga I	16	7	2	1	–		–		18	8
Vaslui	2009–10	Liga I	31	12	6	2	–		4	3	41	17
Vaslui	2010–11	Liga I	32	13	1	0	–		2	0	35	13
Vaslui	2011–12	Liga I	33	27	5	7	–		6	3	44	37
Vaslui	2012–13	Liga I	1	2	0	0	–		0	0	1	2
Vaslui	Total		113	61	14	10	1	0	12	6	139	77
Al-Hilal	2012–13	Saudi Professional League	24	17	3	1	2	1	10	1	39	20
Millonarios	2014	Categoría Primera A	12	1	0	0	–		–		12	1
Politehnica Iași	2014–15	Liga I	8	3	2	0	1	0	–		11	3
Career total			307	127	38	17	5	1	22	7	372	152

== Honours ==
Vaslui

- Liga I runner-up: 2011–12
- Cupa României runner-up: 2010
- UEFA Intertoto Cup: 2008

Al-Hilal

- Crown Prince Cup: 2013

Individual

- Gazeta Sporturilor Foreign Player of the Year in Romania: 2011, 2012
- Vaslui Player of the Season: 2010, 2012
- Liga I top goalscorer: 2011–12
- Saudi Professional League top goalscorer: Runner-up 2012–13

Records

- Vaslui top goalscorer: 77 goals
