= Frumosu =

Frumosu German: Frumossa
- Commune
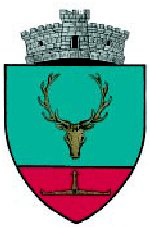
- Coat of arms

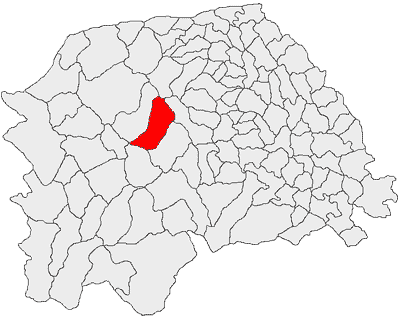
- Location in Suceava County

- Location in Romania
- Coordinates: 47°37′N 25°39′E
- Country: Romania
- County: Suceava
- Subdivisions: Frumosu, Deia, Dragoșa

Government
  - Mayor (2024–2028): Constantin Buga (PNL)
- Area: 99 km^{2} (38 sq mi)
- Elevation: 595 m (1,952 ft)
- Population (2021-12-01): 2,931
  - Density: 30/km^{2} (77/sq mi)
- Time zone: EET/EEST (UTC+2/+3)
- Postal code: 727260
- Area code: (+40) x30
- Vehicle reg.: SV
- Website: comunafrumosu.ro

Frumosu (German: Frumossa) is a commune in Suceava County, in the historical region of Bukovina, northeastern Romania. It consists of three villages: Deia, Dragoșa, and Frumosu.

== History ==
Historical affiliations

Moldavia (1388–1775)
Habsburg Monarchy (1775–1804)
Austrian Empire (1804–1867)
Austria-Hungary, Cisleithania (1867–1918)
Kingdom of Romania (1918–1947)
Romanian People's Republic (1947–1965)
Socialist Republic of Romania (1965–1989)
Romania (1989–present)

Part of the historical region of Bukovina, Frumosu was under Habsburg and Austrian rule (being part of the Duchy of Bukovina, Cisleithania) until 1918 when it became part of the Kingdom of Romania. During the modern period up until the mid 20th century, the commune was also inhabited by a small German minority, more specifically Bukovina Germans (German: Bukowinadeutsche or Buchenlanddeutsche). At the 1930 Romanian census, the Bukovina Germans in Frumosu accounted for 3.1% of the population of the commune, being the second largest ethnic group after the Romanian majority.

== Administration and local politics ==
=== Communal council ===
The commune's current local council has the following political composition, according to the results of the 2020 Romanian local elections:

Party	Seats	Current Council
National Liberal Party (PNL)	9	
Social Democratic Party (PSD)	3	
People's Movement Party (PMP)	1	

== Natives ==
- Toma Niga – footballer
