= Mihai Bălașa =

Romanian footballer

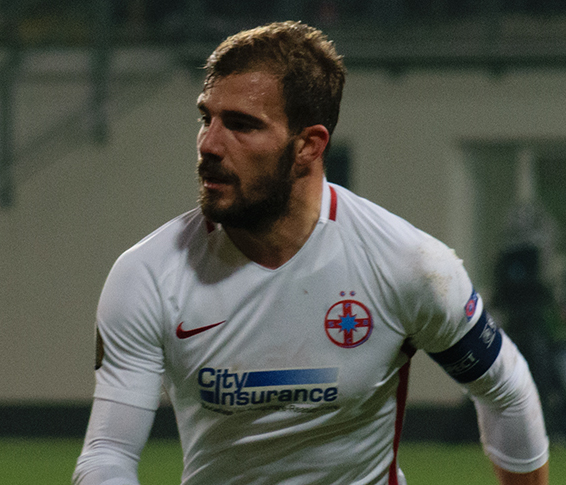
- Bălașa captaining FCSB in 2017

Personal information
- Full name: Mihai Alexandru Bălașa
- Date of birth: 14 January 1995 (age 31)
- Place of birth: Târgoviște, Romania
- Height: 1.86 m (6 ft 1 in)
- Position: Defender

Team information
- Current team: Concordia Chiajna
- Number: 4

Youth career
- 2004–2006: FCM Târgoviște
- 2006–2007: Concordia Chiajna
- 2007–2009: CSȘ Târgoviște
- 2009–2012: Gheorghe Hagi Academy
- 2013–2014: Roma

Senior career*
Years	Team	Apps	(Gls)
2012–2013	Viitorul Constanța	23	(1)
2014–2017	Roma	0	(0)
2014–2016	→ Crotone (loan)	53	(2)
2016–2017	→ Trapani (loan)	8	(0)
2017–2019	FCSB	61	(0)
2019–2022	Universitatea Craiova	57	(3)
2022–2024	Sepsi OSK	47	(3)
2024–2025	Farul Constanța	27	(0)
2025–	Concordia Chiajna	34	(7)

International career
2011–2012	Romania U17	3	(0)
2012–2013	Romania U18	10	(0)
2012–2014	Romania U19	11	(1)
2013–2015	Romania U21	9	(2)
2017–2020	Romania	8	(0)
- * Club domestic league appearances and goals as of 1 November 2026

Mihai Alexandru Bălașa (born 14 January 1995) is a Romanian professional footballer who plays as a defender for Liga II club Concordia Chiajna, which he captains.

== Club career ==
=== Viitorul Constanța ===
Bălașa made his professional debut for Viitorul Constanța on 20 August 2012, in a Liga I game against Gaz Metan Mediaș.

=== Roma ===
In August 2014, Bălașa was transferred by Italian club Roma, joining a growing Romanian contingent at the club. He was part of the squad for the 2014 International Champions Cup, featuring as a second-half substitute against Internazionale.

On 22 August 2014, Bălașa signed for Crotone on loan. He made his debut in the 0–2 defeat to Ternana on 30 August 2014.

Bălașa joined Trapani on a season-long loan on 16 July 2016.

=== FCSB ===
Bălașa returned to Romania in January 2017, signing a five-year contract with FCSB for an undisclosed transfer fee.

On 2 August 2017, he scored the opener from a free kick in a Champions League third qualifying round 4–1 away win over Viktoria Plzeň.

== International career ==
Bălașa has represented Romania on many occasions at youth level.

He earned his first senior international cap for Romania in a 2018 FIFA World Cup qualification match against Denmark on 8 October 2017, playing the full 90 minutes in their 1–1 away draw.

== Personal life ==
Bălașa's father Cristian was also a professional footballer. He played as a midfielder and scored 26 goals in 224 Divizia A matches for Chindia Târgoviște, Argeș Pitești and Farul Constanța combined.

== Career statistics ==
=== Club ===
As of match played 1 November 2026

Appearances and goals by club, season and competition
Club	Season	League			National cup (Note: Includes Cupa României, Coppa Italia)		League cup (Note: Includes Cupa Ligii)		Europe		Other		Total	
Club	Season	Division	Apps	Goals	Apps	Goals	Apps	Goals	Apps	Goals	Apps	Goals	Apps	Goals
Viitorul Constanța	2012–13	Liga I	22	1	1	0	—		—		—		23	1
Viitorul Constanța	2013–14	Liga I	1	0	—		—		—		—		1	0
Viitorul Constanța	Total		23	1	1	0	—		—		—		24	1
Crotone (loan)	2014–15	Serie B	24	0	—		—		—		—		24	0
Crotone (loan)	2015–16	Serie B	29	2	2	0	—		—		—		31	2
Crotone (loan)	Total		53	2	2	0	—		—		—		55	2
Trapani (loan)	2016–17	Serie B	8	0	2	0	—		—		—		10	0
FCSB	2016–17	Liga I	14	0	—		1	0	—		—		15	0
FCSB	2017–18	Liga I	23	0	1	0	—		9 (Note: Two appearances and one goal in UEFA Champions League, seven appearances in UEFA Europa League)	1	—		33	1
FCSB	2018–19	Liga I	20	0	0	0	—		5 (Note: Appearance(s) in UEFA Europa League)	0	—		25	0
FCSB	2019–20	Liga I	4	0	0	0	—		1	0	—		5	0
FCSB	Total		61	0	1	0	1	0	15	1	—		78	1
Universitatea Craiova	2019–20	Liga I	22	3	1	0	—		0	0	—		23	3
Universitatea Craiova	2020–21	Liga I	27	0	5	1	—		0	0	—		32	1
Universitatea Craiova	2021–22	Liga I	8	0	2	1	—		1 (Note: Appearance(s) in UEFA Europa Conference League)	0	1 (Note: Appearance in Supercupa României)	0	12	1
Universitatea Craiova	Total		57	3	8	2	—		1	0	1	0	67	5
Sepsi OSK	2021–22	Liga I	6	1	3	0	—		—		—		9	1
Sepsi OSK	2022–23	Liga I	22	1	4	1	—		3	0	1	0	30	2
Sepsi OSK	2023–24	Liga I	19	1	2	0	—		6	0	1	0	28	1
Sepsi OSK	Total		47	3	9	1	—		9	0	2	0	67	4
Farul Constanța	2024–25	Liga I	27	0	1	0	—		—		—		28	0
Concordia Chiajna	2025–26	Liga II	25	5	4	0	—		—		—		29	5
Concordia Chiajna	2026–27	Liga II	9	2	2	0	—		—		—		11	2
Concordia Chiajna	Total		34	7	6	0	—		—		—		40	7
Career total			310	16	30	3	1	0	25	1	3	0	369	20

=== International ===
As of 15 October 2020

Appearances and goals by national team and year
National team	Year	Apps	Goals
Romania
Romania	2017	2	0
Romania	2018	4	0
Romania	2019	0	0
Romania	2020	2	0
Total		8	0

== Honours ==
Universitatea Craiova

- Cupa României: 2020–21
- Supercupa României: 2021

Sepsi OSK

- Cupa României: 2021–22, 2022–23
- Supercupa României: 2022, 2023
