= Mario Mihai =

Romanian footballer

Personal information
- Full name: Mario Mihai
- Date of birth: 16 February 1999 (age 27)
- Place of birth: Bucharest, Romania
- Height: 1.83 m (6 ft 0 in)
- Position: Midfielder

Senior career*
Years	Team	Apps	(Gls)
2016–2017	FCSB	1	(0)
2016–2020	FCSB II	34	(7)
2017	→ Academica Clinceni (loan)	6	(0)
2018–2019	→ Turris Turnu Măgurele (loan)	4	(0)
2019	→ Daco-Getica București (loan)	11	(2)
2020–2021	Tunari	1	(2)
- * Club domestic league appearances and goals as of 30 April 2021

Mario Mihai (born 16 February 1999) is a Romanian footballer who plays as a midfielder.

== Career statistics ==
=== Club ===
Club	Season	League		Cup		League Cup		Europe		Other		Total	
Club	Season	Apps	Goals	Apps	Goals	Apps	Goals	Apps	Goals	Apps	Goals	Apps	Goals
FCSB	2016–17	1	0	0	0	0	0	0	0	–		1	0
FCSB	2017–18	0	0	2	0	–		–		–		2	0
FCSB	2018–19	0	0	0	0	–		0	0	–		0	0
Total		1	0	2	0	0	0	0	0	–	–	3	0
FCSB II	2016–17	24	1	–		–		–		–		24	1
FCSB II	2017–18	10	6	–		–		–		–		10	6
Total		34	7	–	–	–	–	–	–	–	–	34	7
Academica Clinceni (loan)	2017–18	6	0	0	0	–		–		–		6	0
Total		6	0	0	0	–	–	–	–	–	–	6	0
Turris Turnu Măgurele (loan)	2018–19	0	0	1	1	–		–		–		1	1
Total		0	0	1	1	–	–	–	–	–	–	1	1
Career Total		41	7	3	1	0	0	0	0	–	–	44	8

Statistics accurate as of match played 27 September 2018
