= Marius Chelaru =

Romanian professional footballer

Personal information
- Date of birth: 2 March 1997 (age 29)
- Place of birth: Iași, Romania
- Height: 1.84 m (6 ft 1/2 in)
- Position: Midfielder

Youth career
- –2015: Politehnica Iași

Senior career*
| Years | Team | Apps | (Gls) |
| 2015–2020 | Politehnica Iași | 38 | (1) |
| 2015–2016 | → Metalurgistul (loan) | 0 | (0) |
| 2017 | → Știința Miroslava (loan) | 13 | (2) |
| 2020 | Aerostar Bacău | 8 | (1) |

International career^{‡}
| 2015–2016 | Romania U19 | 3 | (0) |
- * Club domestic league appearances and goals as of 5 November 2020 ‡ National team caps and goals as of 30 August 2017

Marius Chelaru (born 2 March 1997) is a Romanian professional footballer who plays as a midfielder.

== Club career ==
=== Politehnica Iași ===
In the summer of 2017, after helping CS Știința Miroslava secure promotion to the Romanian Liga II, Chelaru returned to Politehnica Iași, and subsequently signed a new contract that will keep him at the team until the summer of 2020.

Helped by the fact that Liga I teams had to play a home grown youth player, Chelaru established himself as a starter under manager Flavius Stoican, in the 2017–18 season.

== Career statistics ==
=== Club ===
As of 7 December 2019

Club statistics
| Club | Season | League | | Cup | | Europe | | Total | |
| Club | Season | Apps | Goals | Apps | Goals | Apps | Goals | Apps | Goals |
|---|---|---|---|---|---|---|---|---|---|
Politehnica Iași
| Politehnica Iași | 2016–17 | 4 | 0 | 1 | 0 | – | | 5 | 0 |
| Politehnica Iași | 2017–18 | 20 | 1 | 3 | 0 | – | | 23 | 1 |
| Politehnica Iași | 2018–19 | 10 | 0 | 1 | 0 | – | | 11 | 0 |
| Politehnica Iași | 2019–20 | 4 | 0 | 0 | 0 | – | | 4 | 0 |
| Politehnica Iași | Total | 38 | 1 | 5 | 0 | – | | 43 | 1 |
| Career total | | 38 | 1 | 5 | 0 | – | | 43 | 1 |

== Honours ==
=== Știința Miroslava ===
- Liga III: 2016–17
