= Daniel Benzar =

Romanian footballer

Personal information
- Full name: Dumitru Daniel Benzar
- Date of birth: 30 December 1997 (age 28)
- Place of birth: Timișoara, Romania
- Height: 1.70 m (5 ft 7 in)
- Position: Right winger

Team information
- Current team: 1599 Șelimbăr
- Number: 10

Youth career
- 2010–2015: LPS Banatul Timișoara

Senior career*
Years	Team	Apps	(Gls)
2015–2019	FCSB	13	(3)
2016	FCSB II		
2015–2016	→ Academica Clinceni (loan)	29	(8)
2017	→ Academica Clinceni (loan)	12	(0)
2018	→ Voluntari (loan)	12	(2)
2019	→ Dunărea Călărași (loan)	14	(1)
2019–2020	Voluntari	12	(0)
2020–2021	Rapid București	9	(1)
2021–2022	ASU Politehnica Timișoara	10	(3)
2022–2023	ASU Politehnica Timișoara	11	(2)
2024	Gloria Buzău	13	(3)
2025–	1599 Șelimbăr	47	(6)
- * Club domestic league appearances and goals as of 17 October 2026

Dumitru Daniel Benzar (born 30 December 1997) is a Romanian professional footballer who plays as a right winger for Liga II club 1599 Șelimbăr.

== Club career ==
=== FCSB ===
Daniel Benzar played his first official game in Liga I in 2017, in a 1–1 draw against Universitatea Craiova, coming on as a substitute for Harlem Gnohéré in the 70th minute. He scored his first goal for Steaua on 6 August 2017 in a 2–1 away win over Concordia Chiajna.

== Personal life ==
Daniel Benzar is the younger brother of Politehnica Timișoara player Romario Benzar.
