= Romario Benzar =

Romanian footballer

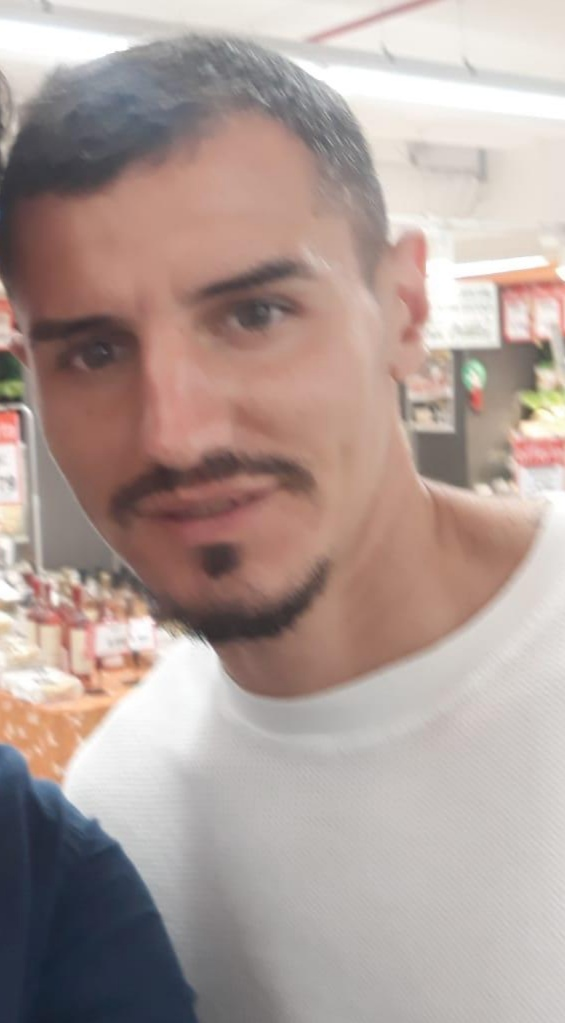
- Benzar in 2019

Personal information
- Full name: Romario Sandu Benzar
- Date of birth: 26 March 1992 (age 34)
- Place of birth: Timișoara, Romania
- Height: 1.80 m (5 ft 11 in)
- Position: Right-back

Team information
- Current team: Politehnica Timișoara
- Number: 20

Youth career
- 2001–2008: Srbianka Giuchici Timișoara
- 2008–2009: LPS Banatul Timișoara
- 2009–2010: Gheorghe Hagi Academy

Senior career*
Years	Team	Apps	(Gls)
2010–2017	Viitorul Constanța	200	(10)
2017–2019	FCSB	50	(1)
2019–2022	Lecce	3	(0)
2020	→ Perugia (loan)	4	(0)
2020–2021	→ Viitorul Constanța (loan)	23	(0)
2022–2023	Farul Constanța	6	(0)
2023	UTA Arad	9	(0)
2023–2025	Botoșani	37	(0)
2025–	Politehnica Timișoara	32	(4)

International career
2008–2009	Romania U17	6	(2)
2011	Romania U19	3	(0)
2012–2014	Romania U21	10	(1)
2016–2019	Romania	19	(0)
- * Club domestic league appearances and goals as of 24 October 2026

Romario Sandu Benzar (born 26 March 1992) is a Romanian professional footballer who plays as a right-back for Liga II club Politehnica Timișoara.

== Club career ==
=== Viitorul Constanța ===
Benzar started playing football in the Gheorghe Hagi Academy and made his debut for fellow team Viitorul Constanța in 2010. He won the Liga I in 2016–17.

=== FCSB ===
On 10 August 2017, FCSB announced the signings of Benzar and his Viitorul Constanța teammate Dragoș Nedelcu for a combined €2.7 million. Benzar penned a five-year deal with a €10 million buyout clause.

He scored his first competitive goal with a free kick in a 2–1 league victory over Juventus București.

=== Lecce ===
On 30 June 2019, it was announced that Benzar had signed with newly promoted Serie A side Lecce for a reported fee of €2,000,000.

==== Loan to Perugia ====
On 20 January 2020, he joined Serie B club Perugia on loan until the end of the 2019–20 season, with an option to purchase.

==== Loan to Viitorul ====
On 24 September 2020 he was loaned to Viitorul.

== International career ==
Benzar made his debut for Romania U17 on 21 September 2008, in a game against Denmark.

He was part of the team which played at the 2011 UEFA European Under-19 Football Championship in Romania.

In September 2016, Benzar was selected in Romania's senior squad for the 2018 FIFA World Cup qualifier against Montenegro.

== Personal life ==
Benzar is named after former Brazilian international Romário. His younger brother, Daniel, is also a footballer.

== Career statistics ==
=== Club ===
As of 28 October 2026

Appearances and goals by club, season and competition
Club	Season	League			National cup (Note: Includes Cupa României, Coppa Italia)		League cup (Note: Includes Cupa Ligii)		Europe		Other		Total	
Club	Season	Division	Apps	Goals	Apps	Goals	Apps	Goals	Apps	Goals	Apps	Goals	Apps	Goals
Viitorul Constanța	2009–10	Liga III	8	0	0	0	—		—		—		8	0
Viitorul Constanța	2010–11	Liga II	23	0	1	1	—		—		—		24	1
Viitorul Constanța	2011–12	Liga II	19	1	1	0	—		—		—		20	1
Viitorul Constanța	2012–13	Liga I	24	3	1	0	—		—		—		25	3
Viitorul Constanța	2013–14	Liga I	29	1	3	0	—		—		—		32	1
Viitorul Constanța	2014–15	Liga I	29	2	1	0	2	0	—		—		32	2
Viitorul Constanța	2015–16	Liga I	31	2	3	0	2	0	—		—		36	2
Viitorul Constanța	2016–17	Liga I	34	1	1	0	1	0	1 (Note: Appearances in UEFA Europa League)	0	—		37	1
Viitorul Constanța	2017–18	Liga I	3	0	—		—		2 (Note: Appearances in UEFA Champions League)	0	1 (Note: Appearance in Supercupa României)	0	6	0
Viitorul Constanța	Total		200	10	11	1	5	0	3	0	1	0	220	11
FCSB	2017–18	Liga I	19	1	0	0	—		5	0	—		24	1
FCSB	2018–19	Liga I	31	0	0	0	—		5	0	—		36	0
FCSB	Total		50	1	0	0	0	0	10	0	0	0	60	1
Lecce	2019–20	Serie A	3	0	1	0	—		—		—		4	0
Perugia (loan)	2019–20	Serie B	4	0	0	0	—		—		—		4	0
Viitorul Constanța (loan)	2020–21	Liga I	23	0	0	0	—		—		—		23	0
Farul Constanța	2022–23	Liga I	6	0	1	0	—		—		—		7	0
UTA Arad	2022–23	Liga I	9	0	0	0	—		—		—		9	0
Botoșani	2023–24	Liga I	27	0	2	0	—		—		2 (Note: Appearances in Liga I promotion/relegation play-offs)	0	31	0
Botoșani	2024–25	Liga I	8	0	0	0	—		—		—		8	0
Botoșani	2025–26	Liga I	2	0	0	0	—		—		—		2	0
Botoșani	Total		37	0	2	0	—		—		2	0	41	0
Politehnica Timișoara	2025–26	Liga III	23	4	—		—		—		—		23	4
Politehnica Timișoara	2026–27	Liga II	9	0	3	0	—		—		—		12	0
Politehnica Timișoara	Total		32	4	3	0	—		—		—		35	4
Career total			364	15	18	1	5	0	13	0	3	0	403	16

=== International ===
As of 18 November 2019

Appearances and goals by national team and year
National team	Year	Apps	Goals
Romania	2016	4	0
Romania	2017	6	0
Romania	2018	4	0
Romania	2019	5	0
Total		19	0

== Honours ==
Viitorul Constanța

- Liga I: 2016–17
- Supercupa României runner-up: 2017
- Liga III: 2009–10

Farul Constanța

- Liga I: 2022–23

ASU Politehnica Timișoara

- Liga III: 2025–26

Individual

- Liga I Team of the Season: 2016–17, 2018–19
- Liga I Team of the Regular Season: 2018–19
- Liga I Team of the Championship play-offs: 2018–19
