= Harlem Gnohéré =

French footballer (born 1988)

Personal information
- Full name: Harlem-Eddy Gnohéré
- Date of birth: 21 February 1988 (age 38)
- Place of birth: Paris, France
- Height: 1.83 m (6 ft 0 in)
- Position: Striker

Youth career
- 2004–2005: Cannes
- 2005–2007: Troyes

Senior career*
Years	Team	Apps	(Gls)
2007–2008	La Tour/Le Pâquier	14	(3)
2008–2009	Bulle	25	(16)
2009–2010	Urania Genève	23	(14)
2010–2011	Virton	25	(22)
2011–2014	Charleroi	58	(21)
2013	→ Westerlo (loan)	11	(1)
2014	→ Mouscron (loan)	10	(5)
2014–2015	Mons	25	(11)
2015–2017	Dinamo București	45	(17)
2017–2020	FCSB	92	(41)
2020–2022	Mouscron	33	(2)
Total		388	(158)
- * Club domestic league appearances and goals

Harlem-Eddy Gnohéré (born 21 February 1988) is a French former professional footballer who played as a striker.

Nicknamed "the Bison" due to his strong body frame, Gnohéré started his career as a junior in his native France, and went on to compete in Switzerland, Belgium and Romania.

He represented in the latter country rival teams Dinamo București and FCSB, and became the top scorer of the domestic league in the 2017–18 season. The Gazeta Sporturilor daily named him Foreign Player of the Year twice in a row for his individual performances in Romania.

== Career ==
=== Dinamo București ===
On 16 July 2015, Gnohéré signed a two-year contract with Romanian team Dinamo București. He was previously unveiled as the player of Petrolul Ploiești, but was quickly released because he was deemed overweight. He scored his first goal on his second Liga I match, a 2–1 victory over ACS Poli Timișoara on 3 August.

On 22 November 2015, Gnohéré netted in a derby against FC Steaua București, which Dinamo won 3–1. After the departure of Cosmin Matei in the winter transfer window, he took over the number 10 jersey. On 17 May 2016, Gnohéré scored in the Cupa României final against CFR Cluj, but his side lost the game 4–5 at the penalty shootout. He ended his first campaign with 18 goals from 41 appearances all competitions comprised.

On 23 July 2016, Gnohéré scored a hat-trick and provided an assist in a 4–1 away win against defending champions Astra Giurgiu. In early September, it was reported that cross-town rival Steaua București wished to sign him. Shortly after, he refused to extend his contract with Dinamo and was sent to play for the reserves in the third league for an undetermined period. Gnohéré was however recalled to the first team after less than a month. His last goal was netted from the penalty spot on 26 November 2016, in a 2–1 away defeat of Voluntari.

=== FCSB ===
There are decisions you have to make that, unfortunately, are not the best for some supporters or clubs.

— Gnohéré after signing his contract with FCSB, on 7 January 2017

In January 2017, after entering the final six months of his contract with Dinamo București, Gnohéré moved to FC Steaua București—later renamed FCSB—for an undisclosed transfer fee. He became the first foreigner to have played for the two Bucharest rivals.

On 19 October 2017, Gnohéré recorded his first European goals in a 2–1 away victory over Hapoel Be'er Sheva in the UEFA Europa League group stages. Three days later, he scored a hat-trick in a 7–0 away rout of ACS Poli Timișoara. On 15 February 2018, Gnohéré scored the only goal of a Europa League round of 32 first leg match with Italian team Lazio. He repeated the performance in the second leg at the Stadio Olimpico, but FCSB lost the game 1–5.

Gnohéré became the first player outside Romania to net for both Steaua/FCSB and Dinamo in the Eternal derby, after opening the scoring in a 3–3 league draw on 29 July 2018. On 31 March 2019, he scored the winner in a 3–2 victory over title contenders Universitatea Craiova, representing his 50th goal in the first division.

On 4 June 2020, FCSB announced the termination of Gnohéré's contract, almost three months after being placed on technical unemployment because of the COVID-19 pandemic. He departed as the club's top foreign goalscorer in the Liga I with 41 goals, as well as the championship's third-best foreign goalscorer with 58 goals.

=== Return to Mouscron ===
On 20 July 2020, Gnohéré returned to his former club Mouscron.

== Personal life ==
Born in France, Gnohéré is of Ivorian descent. His brother Arthur was also a footballer, and he too played for several clubs in France and Switzerland.

== Career statistics ==
As of match played 22 February 2020

Appearances and goals by club, season and competition
Club	Season	League			National cup (Note: Includes Swiss Cup, Belgian Cup, Cupa României)		League cup (Note: Includes Cupa Ligii)		Continental		Other		Total	
Club	Season	Division	Apps	Goals	Apps	Goals	Apps	Goals	Apps	Goals	Apps	Goals	Apps	Goals
La Tour/Le Pâquier	2007–08	Swiss 1. Liga	14	3	0	0	—		—		—		14	3
Bulle	2008–09	Swiss 1. Liga	25	16	3	2	—		—		—		28	18
Urania Genève Sport	2009–10	Swiss 1. Liga	23	14	1	1	—		—		—		24	15
Virton	2010–11	Belgian Third Division	25	22	1	0	—		—		4	1	30	23
Charleroi	2011–12	Belgian Second Division	32	18	—		—		—		—		32	18
Charleroi	2012–13	Belgian Pro League	16	2	1	1	—		—		—		17	3
Charleroi	2013–14	Belgian Pro League	10	1	1	0	—		—		—		11	1
Charleroi	Total		58	21	2	1	0	0	0	0	0	0	60	22
Westerlo (loan)	2012–13	Belgian Second Division	11	1	—		—		—		3	0	14	1
Mouscron-Péruwelz (loan)	2013–14	Belgian Second Division	15	10	—		—		—		1	0	16	10
Mons	2014–15	Belgian Second Division	24	11	—		—		—		—		24	11
Dinamo București	2015–16	Liga I	31	12	6	5	4	1	—		—		41	18
Dinamo București	2016–17	Liga I	14	5	1	0	2	1	—		—		17	6
Dinamo București	Total		45	17	7	5	6	2	0	0	0	0	58	24
FCSB	2016–17	Liga I	14	5	—		1	0	—		—		15	5
FCSB	2017–18	Liga I	31	15	2	1	—		11 (Note: Four appearances in UEFA Champions League, seven appearances and five goals in UEFA Europa League)	5	—		44	21
FCSB	2018–19	Liga I	29	15	0	0	—		6 (Note: Appearances in UEFA Europa League)	4	—		35	19
FCSB	2019–20	Liga I	18	6	1	0	—		2	0	—		21	6
FCSB	Total		92	41	3	1	1	0	19	9	—		115	51
Career total			332	156	17	10	7	2	19	9	8	1	383	178

== Honours ==
Charleroi

- Belgian Second Division: 2011–12

Dinamo București

- Cupa României runner-up: 2015–16
- Cupa Ligii: 2016–17

FCSB

- Cupa României: 2019–20
- Supercupa României runner-up: 2020

Individual

- Gazeta Sporturilor Foreign Player of the Year in Romania: 2017, 2018
- DigiSport Liga I Player of the Month: September 2015, October 2017
- UEFA Europa League Player of the Week: 20 October 2017,
- Liga I top scorer: 2017–18 (shared George Țucudean)
- Liga I Team of the Season: 2017–18, 2018–19,
- Liga I Team of the Championship play-offs: 2017–18, 2018–19,
