= Filipe Teixeira =

Portuguese retired footballer (born 1980)

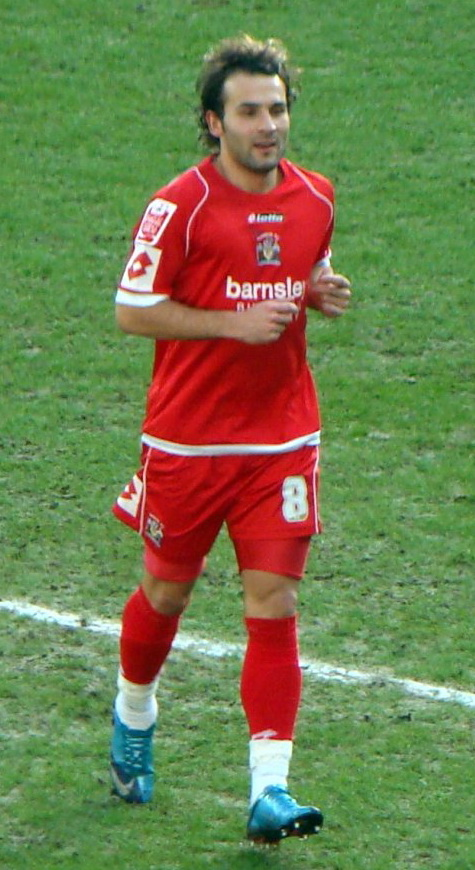
- Teixeira with Barnsley in 2010

Personal information
- Full name: Filipe Andrade Teixeira
- Date of birth: 2 October 1980 (age 46)
- Place of birth: Boulogne-Billancourt, France
- Height: 1.75 m (5 ft 9 in)
- Position: Midfielder

Youth career
- 1988–1990: Boulogne-Billancourt
- 1990–1998: Felgueiras

Senior career*
Years	Team	Apps	(Gls)
1998–2001	Felgueiras	85	(16)
2001–2002	Istres	16	(2)
2002–2005	Paris Saint-Germain	18	(0)
2003–2004	→ União Leiria (loan)	21	(0)
2005–2007	Académica	59	(4)
2007–2010	West Bromwich Albion	49	(5)
2010	→ Barnsley (loan)	14	(0)
2010–2011	Metalurh Donetsk	7	(0)
2011	→ FC Brașov (loan)	12	(1)
2011–2013	Rapid București	40	(6)
2013	Al-Shaab	12	(0)
2013–2015	Petrolul Ploiești	49	(15)
2015–2017	Astra Giurgiu	54	(8)
2017–2019	FCSB	54	(5)
Total		490	(62)

International career
1998–1999	Portugal U18	10	(1)
2000	Portugal U20	5	(0)
2001–2002	Portugal U21	9	(2)
Medal record
Representing Portugal
Men's football
UEFA European Under-18 Championship
Winner	1999 Sweden
- * Club domestic league appearances and goals

Filipe Andrade Teixeira (Portuguese pronunciation: [tɐjˈʃɐjɾɐ]; born 2 October 1980) is a Portuguese former professional footballer who played as a midfielder. He was regarded as technical and creative, being capable of playing in several midfield positions.

Teixeira started out as a senior at Felgueiras in 1998, and spent the first part of his career with stints between Portugal and France, namely at Istres, Paris Saint-Germain, União Leiria and Académica. He moved to English club West Bromwich Albion in 2007 and also had a loan spell at Barnsley in 2010, before spending his late years in Ukraine, Romania and the United Arab Emirates.

Born in France, Teixeira represented Portugal at under-18, under-20 and under-21 levels. With the former side, he won the UEFA European Championship in 1999.

== Club career ==
=== Early career ===
Born in Boulogne-Billancourt, France, Teixeira started his senior career with Felgueiras in the Segunda Divisão, being an automatic first-choice since the age of 18.

After a career-best nine goals in 2000–01 season, he returned to his nation of birth – his parents were Portuguese immigrants – and signed with Division 2 club Istres.

=== Paris Saint-Germain ===
Although he appeared sparingly for the Bouches-du-Rhône side in his only season, Teixeira joined Ligue 1 after being transferred to Paris Saint-Germain where he teamed up with Brazil's Ronaldinho, being rarely used during his spell with the capital side.

Teixeira then returned to Portugal, making his Primeira Liga debut at Vítor Pontes's União de Leiria, on loan, and playing alongside Hugo Almeida and Luís Filipe. At the end of the campaign he went back to PSG, and shared teams up with two more compatriots: Pauleta and Hugo Leal.

Another move to Portugal followed, as Teixeira signed for Académica de Coimbra. With the Students, he only missed five league game in two seasons combined, helping the team to consecutive 13th-place finishes (the competition changed from 18 to 16 clubs for 2006–07).

=== West Bromwich Albion ===
Teixeira completed a move to West Bromwich Albion on 17 July 2007 for a fee of £600,000, signing a three-year contract. He made his pre-season debut one week later against Northampton Town, scoring twice, and his first appearance in the Football League Championship came in a 1–2 defeat at Burnley, on the opening day of the season.

Teixeira scored his first goal for Albion in a 2–0 home win over Barnsley, on 1 September 2007. His performances in midfield during that month earned him a place on the shortlist for Championship Player of the Month, although the award eventually went to Watford's Darius Henderson.

Teixeira was stretchered off after 18 minutes of WBA's 3–0 home win against Plymouth Argyle in early March 2008, when he landed awkwardly following a clash with Gary Sawyer– initial scans on the player's knee suggested that he had suffered cruciate ligament damage and was "likely to miss the rest of the campaign". The prognosis proved correct and he returned to Portugal to have an operation, before undergoing rehabilitation at former club Académica; as Albion promoted to the Premier League, he contributed with five goals in 30 games.

On 31 January 2010, having appeared scarcely for WBA following his return from injury, Teixeira joined fellow division two club Barnsley, on loan until the rest of the season.

=== Late career ===
On 22 June 2010, aged nearly 30, Teixeira joined Ukrainian side Metalurh Donetsk on a two-year contract, after being granted a free transfer from West Bromwich– he teamed up at the club with compatriots China and Mário Sérgio. In February of the following year, however, he was loaned to FC Brașov in Romania for six months.

Teixeira continued in Romania and its Liga I for the 2011–12 season, signing for Rapid București. He was released from his contract after the club entered administration, and moved to the United Arab Emirates with Al-Shaab.

Teixeira returned to Romania in the summer of 2013, joining Petrolul Ploiești. He scored seven league goals in 29 games in his debut campaign, helping his new team to the third position with the subsequent qualification to the UEFA Europa League; on 7 August 2014 he opened the scoring against Viktoria Plzeň, contributing to 4–1 away win for the third qualifying round of the Europa League (5–2 on aggregate).

On 23 June 2017, after spending the preceding two seasons with Astra Giurgiu where he won the 2015–16 national title, Teixeira signed a one-year contract with FCSB. He netted his first competitive goal on 25 July, his header helping to a 2–2 home draw to Viktoria Plzeň for the third qualifying round of the UEFA Champions League; he scored again in the second leg, a 4–1 victory where he also obtained a penalty. Teixeira played his last professional match on 19 May 2019, scoring the only goal in a league win over CFR Cluj.

== Career statistics ==
=== Club ===
Appearances and goals by club, season and competition
Club	Season	League		National Cup		League Cup		Continental		Other		Total	
Club	Season	Apps	Goals	Apps	Goals	Apps	Goals	Apps	Goals	Apps	Goals	Apps	Goals
Felgueiras	1998–99	27	2	2	1	—		—		—		29	3
Felgueiras	1999–00	27	5	3	0	—		—		—		30	5
Felgueiras	2000–01	29	9	2	1	—		—		—		31	10
Felgueiras	Total	85	16	7	2	—		—		—		92	18
Istres	2001–02	16	2	0	0	0	0	—		—		16	2
Paris Saint-Germain	2002–03	8	0	1	0	0	0	3	0	—		12	0
Paris Saint-Germain	2004–05	10	0	2	1	1	0	0	0	0	0	13	1
Paris Saint-Germain	Total	18	0	3	1	1	0	3	0	0	0	25	1
União Leiria (loan)	2003–04	21	0	2	0	—		—		—		23	0
Académica	2005–06	30	3	1	0	—		—		—		31	3
Académica	2006–07	29	1	3	0	—		—		—		32	1
Académica	Total	59	4	4	0	—		—		—		63	4
West Bromwich Albion	2007–08	30	5	4	0	3	0	—		—		37	5
West Bromwich Albion	2008–09	10	0	3	0	0	0	—		—		13	0
West Bromwich Albion	2009–10	9	0	1	0	2	0	—		—		12	0
West Bromwich Albion	Total	49	5	8	0	5	0	—		—		62	5
Barnsley (loan)	2009–10	14	0	—		—		—		—		14	0
Metalurh Donetsk	2010–11	7	0	0	0	—		—		—		7	0
FC Brașov (loan)	2010–11	12	1	1	0	—		—		—		13	1
Rapid București	2011–12	25	4	5	0	—		5	1	—		35	5
Rapid București	2012–13	15	2	2	0	—		4	1	—		21	3
Rapid București	Total	40	6	7	0	—		9	2	—		56	8
Al-Shaab	2012–13	12	0	1	0	—		—		—		13	0
Petrolul Ploiești	2013–14	29	7	5	0	—		5	0	1	0	40	7
Petrolul Ploiești	2014–15	20	8	3	0	0	0	6	2	—		29	10
Petrolul Ploiești	Total	49	15	8	0	0	0	11	2	1	0	69	17
Astra Giurgiu	2015–16	26	4	2	0	3	1	4	0	—		35	5
Astra Giurgiu	2016–17	28	4	4	0	1	0	11	2	1	0	45	6
Astra Giurgiu	Total	54	8	6	0	4	1	15	2	1	0	80	11
FCSB	2017–18	27	3	0	0	—		9	2	—		36	5
FCSB	2018–19	27	2	1	0	—		5	1	—		33	3
FCSB	Total	54	5	1	0	—		14	3	—		69	8
Career total		490	62	48	3	10	1	52	9	2	0	602	75

== Honours ==
Paris Saint-Germain

- Trophée des Champions runner-up: 2004

West Bromwich Albion

- Football League Championship: 2007–08

Rapid București

- Cupa României runner-up: 2011–12

Petrolul Ploiești

- Supercupa României runner-up: 2013

Astra Giurgiu

- Liga I: 2015–16
- Cupa României runner-up: 2016–17
- Supercupa României: 2016

Portugal

- UEFA European Under-18 Championship: 1999
