= Billel Omrani =

Algerian footballer (born 1993)

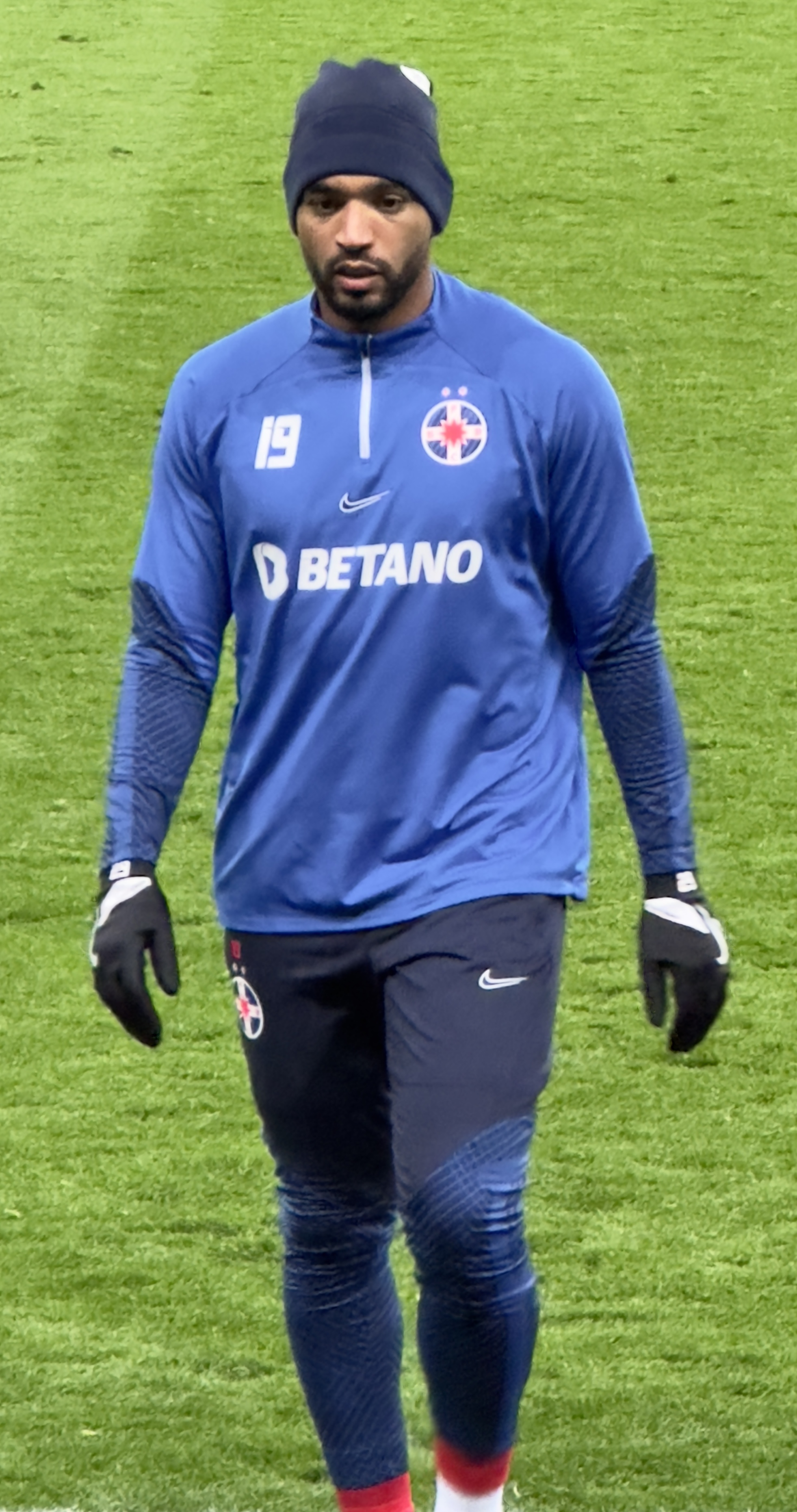
- Omrani with FCSB in 2023

Personal information
- Full name: Abdel Slem Billel Omrani
- Date of birth: 2 June 1993 (age 33)
- Place of birth: Forbach, France
- Height: 1.87 m (6 ft 2 in)
- Position: Forward

Team information
- Current team: CFR Cluj
- Number: 29

Youth career
- 1999–2006: SO Merlebach
- 2004–2006: Gymnastique Marienau
- 2007–2011: Marseille

Senior career*
Years	Team	Apps	(Gls)
2011–2016	Marseille	6	(1)
2012–2016	Marseille B	62	(24)
2013–2014	→ Arles-Avignon (loan)	13	(0)
2016–2022	CFR Cluj	164	(33)
2022–2023	FCSB	22	(2)
2023–2024	Petrolul Ploiești	5	(0)
2024	Wisła Kraków	2	(0)
2024	Politehnica Iași	3	(0)
2025–2026	Anagennisi Karditsa	11	(1)
2026	Concordia Chiajna	8	(2)
2026–	CFR Cluj	3	(0)

International career
2009–2010	France U17	11	(4)
2010	France U18	5	(1)
2012	France U19	2	(0)
2022	Algeria	1	(0)
- * Club domestic league appearances and goals as of 31 October 2026

Abdel Slem Billel Omrani (Arabic: عبد السلام بلال عمراني; born 2 June 1993) is a professional footballer who plays as a forward for Liga I club CFR Cluj.

A product of the Marseille academy, Omrani made his Ligue 1 debut for the club in 2011. He amassed ten games for the first team and had a loan stint at Arles-Avignon, before moving to Romania with CFR Cluj in 2016. In the latter country, Omrani won seven domestic trophies and was named the league's Foreign Player of the Year in 2019. He moved to rivals FCSB on a free transfer in 2022.

Born in France, Omrani represented the nation at under-17, under-18 and under-19 levels. In June 2022, he switched his allegiance to Algeria by making his full debut in a 2–1 friendly win over Iran.

== Club career ==
=== Early career / Marseille ===
Omrani joined the youth system of Marseille in 2007, after spells with two amateur clubs in the Moselle area. On 19 March 2011, he agreed to a three-year professional contract with the Stade Vélodrome side.

Omrani was subsequently promoted to the senior squad by manager Didier Deschamps for the 2011–12 season, being assigned the number 25 shirt. He made his senior debut by coming on as an 83rd-minute substitute for Alou Diarra in a 1–1 Ligue 1 draw with Brest, on 2 October 2011.

=== CFR Cluj ===
Omrani moved abroad for the first time by signing a contract with Romanian team CFR Cluj in September 2016. On the 17th that month, he recorded his debut and scored in a 5–0 Liga I thrashing of Voluntari.

During the following season, Omrani totalled nine goals from 31 appearances in all competitions as "the White-Burgundies" won the national championship. On 8 July 2018, amid rumours regarding a transfer to title contenders FCSB, CFR announced that he penned down a three-year contract extension. Six days later, Omrani obtained the penalty kick from which Emmanuel Culio scored the only goal of the 2018 Supercupa României win over Universitatea Craiova.

In 2019, Omrani was linked with a move to Celtic after netting against them twice in the third qualifying round of the UEFA Champions League, but nothing came of it. That year, he was handed the Foreign Player of the Year award by the Gazeta Sporturilor daily.

Omrani left Cluj-Napoca as a free agent in the summer of 2022, after aiding the team in winning five national titles and two supercups during his six-year stint.

=== FCSB ===
On 13 September 2022, Omrani continued in Romania and its Liga I by signing a one-year contract with the option of another two years for FCSB. He scored his first goal on 11 December, in a 2–0 away league win over Chindia Târgoviște.

Omrani made 22 appearances and only netted two goals, and the club chose not to renew his deal at the end of the campaign.

=== Petrolul Ploiești ===
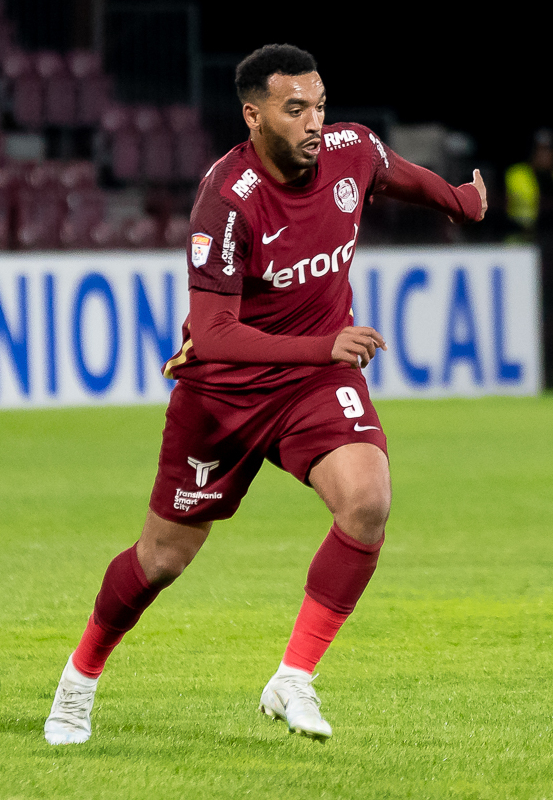
Omrani playing for CFR Cluj in April 2022.

On 28 September 2023, Omrani moved to fellow Liga I club Petrolul Ploiești as a free agent. He made his debut on 31 October, in a 2–0 away win over Chindia Târgoviște in the group stage of the Cupa României.

=== Wisła Kraków ===
After terminating his deal with Petrolul Ploiești on 18 January 2024, Omrani was a free agent for over a month before joining Polish second division side Wisła Kraków on 26 February, on a deal until the end of the season. As reported by Polish media, he would earn a total wage of approximately €10,000 for his stay at Wisła. He made his first appearance as a late substitute in a 3–2 away league loss to Chrobry Głogów on 30 March.

He was omitted from the squad for the 2023–24 Polish Cup final on 2 May, which saw Wisła win 2–1 over Ekstraklasa club Pogoń Szczecin. Shortly after, manager Albert Rudé stated Omrani was unlikely to feature for the rest of the season for disciplinary reasons.

He left the club on 4 June 2024, upon the expiration of his contract.

== International career ==
=== France ===
Omrani is a former France youth international, having represented the country at under-17, under-18 and under-19 levels. With the under-17 side, he played at the 2010 UEFA European Championship.

=== Algeria ===
Omrani was also eligible to represent Algeria, and in October 2011 was called up to the under-23 team to participate in the friendly matches ahead of the 2011 CAF Championship. However, the report of the call-up was deemed erroneous due to a misunderstanding between the team's coach and the Algerian media; the latter assumed the coach was calling up Omrani, when he was in fact calling up another French-born player who was also featuring for Marseille.

In February 2013, Omrani was invited by the Algeria under-20 national team coach Jean-Marc Nobilo to be a member of the squad for the 2013 African Championship, but declined the offer. In May 2022, he received his first call-up to the Algeria senior team for the 2023 AFCON qualification matches against Uganda and Tanzania. He made his debut on 12 June, coming on for Rachid Ghezzal in the 71st minute of a 2–1 friendly win against Iran in Doha.

== Personal life ==
Omrani's elder brother Abdelhakim also played professional football in Romania for Dunărea Călărași, and his elder sister Yasmina was an international heptathlete.

== Career statistics ==
=== Club ===
As of match played 31 October 2026

Appearances and goals by club, season and competition
Club	Season	League			National Cup		League Cup		Continental		Other		Total	
Club	Season	Division	Apps	Goals	Apps	Goals	Apps	Goals	Apps	Goals	Apps	Goals	Apps	Goals
Marseille	2011–12	Ligue 1	1	0	1	0	1	0	0	0	—		3	0
Marseille	2012–13	Ligue 1	1	0	0	0	0	0	2	0	—		3	0
Marseille	2014–15	Ligue 1	4	1	0	0	0	0	—		—		4	1
Marseille	Total		6	1	1	0	1	0	2	0	—		10	1
Marseille B	2012–13	CFA 2	22	14	—		—		—		—		22	14
Marseille B	2014–15	CFA 2	18	8	—		—		—		—		18	8
Marseille B	2015–16	CFA	22	2	—		—		—		—		22	2
Marseille B	Total		62	24	—		—		—		—		62	24
Arles-Avignon (loan)	2013–14	Ligue 2	13	0	0	0	2	1	—		—		15	1
CFR Cluj	2016–17	Liga I	28	5	2	1	0	0	—		—		30	6
CFR Cluj	2017–18	Liga I	30	8	1	1	—		—		—		31	9
CFR Cluj	2018–19	Liga I	32	6	4	0	—		5	3	1	0	42	9
CFR Cluj	2019–20	Liga I	28	6	0	0	—		16	7	1	0	45	13
CFR Cluj	2020–21	Liga I	16	3	0	0	—		3	0	—		19	3
CFR Cluj	2021–22	Liga I	30	5	0	0	—		11	2	1	0	42	7
CFR Cluj	Total		164	33	7	2	0	0	35	12	3	0	209	47
FCSB	2022–23	Liga I	22	2	0	0	—		—		—		22	2
Petrolul Ploiești	2023–24	Liga I	5	0	2	0	—		—		—		7	0
Wisła Kraków	2023–24	I liga	2	0	0	0	—		—		—		2	0
Politehnica Iași	2024–25	Liga I	3	0	3	0	—		—		—		6	0
Anagennisi Karditsa	2025–26	Super League Greece 2	11	1	0	0	—		—		—		11	1
Concordia Chiajna	2025–26	Liga II	8	2	—		—		—		—		8	2
CFR Cluj	2026–27	Liga I	3	0	1	0	—		—		—		4	0
Career total			299	63	14	2	3	1	37	12	3	0	356	78

=== International ===
As of match played 12 June 2022

Appearances and goals by national team and year
National team	Year	Apps	Goals
Algeria
Algeria	2022	1	0
Total		1	0

== Honours ==
Marseille

- Coupe de la Ligue: 2011–12
- Trophée des Champions: 2011

Marseille B

- CFA 2 — Group Provence-Alpes-Côte d'Azur-Corsica: 2012–13

CFR Cluj

- Liga I: 2017–18, 2018–19, 2019–20, 2020–21, 2021–22
- Supercupa României: 2018, 2020; runner-up: 2021

Wisła Kraków

- Polish Cup: 2023–24

Individual

- Gazeta Sporturilor Foreign Player of the Year in Romania: 2019
