= Foreign Player of the Year in Romania (Gazeta Sporturilor) =

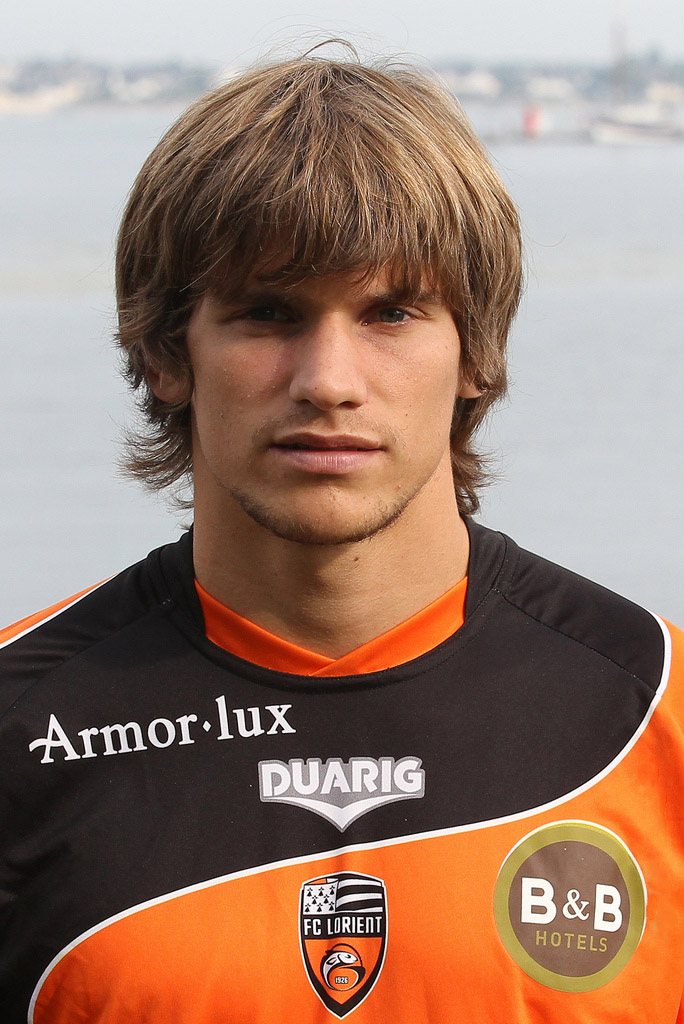
- Sebastián Dubarbier was the first winner of the award.
- Sport: Association football
- Competition: All levels of Romanian football (generally Liga I)
- Local name: Jucătorul străin al anului (Romanian)
- Country: Romania
- Presented by: Gazeta Sporturilor

History
- First award: 2008
- Editions: 18
- First winner: (Argentina) Sebastián Dubarbier
- Most wins: (France) Harlem Gnohéré (Brazil) Wesley (Brazil) Eric de Oliveira (2)
- Most recent: (Italy) Juri Cisotti
- Website: Official website

The Foreign Player of the Year in Romania (Romanian: Jucătorul străin al anului) is an association football award presented to players in Romania, which recognises the most outstanding foreign player in the country each calendar year. It was started in 2008 by Gazeta Sporturilor, a daily sports newspaper, and the winner is usually announced at the end of December.

Other annual honours handed out by Gazeta Sporturilor include the Romanian Footballer of the Year and the Romania Coach of the Year awards.

== Winners ==
Foreign Player of the Year in Romania winners
Year	Winner	Nationality	Club(s)	Ref.
2008	Sebastián Dubarbier	Argentina	CFR Cluj	
2009	Pablo Brandán	Argentina	Unirea Urziceni	
2010	Eric de Oliveira	Brazil	Gaz Metan Mediaș	
2011	Wesley	Brazil	Vaslui	
2012	Wesley	Brazil	Vaslui (Saudi Arabia) Al-Hilal	
2013	Eric de Oliveira	Brazil	Gaz Metan Mediaș; Pandurii Târgu Jiu	
2014	Łukasz Szukała	Poland	Steaua București	
2015	Fernando Varela	Cape Verde	Steaua București	
2016	Fernando Boldrin	Brazil	Astra Giurgiu; Steaua București	
2017	Harlem Gnohéré	France	FCSB	
2018	Harlem Gnohéré	France	FCSB	
2019	Billel Omrani	France (Note: Omrani changed his allegiance to Algeria in June 2022.)	CFR Cluj	
2020	Paulo Vinícius	Brazil	CFR Cluj	
2021	Jefté Betancor	Spain	Voluntari; Farul Constanța	
2022	Andrea Compagno	Italy	FC U Craiova; FCSB	
2023	Marko Dugandžić	Croatia	Rapid București (Saudi Arabia) Al-Tai	
2024	Risto Radunović	Montenegro	FCSB	
2025	Juri Cisotti	Italy	FCSB	

== Breakdown of winners ==
=== By number of wins ===
Player	Win(s)	Year(s)
(France) Harlem Gnohéré	2	2017, 2018
(Brazil) Wesley	2	2011, 2012
(Brazil) Eric de Oliveira	2	2010, 2013
12 others	1	—

=== By country ===
Country	Win(s)	Year(s)
Brazil	6	2010, 2011, 2012, 2013, 2016, 2020
France	3	2017, 2018, 2019
Argentina	2	2008, 2009
Italy	2	2022, 2025
Cape Verde	1	2015
Croatia	1	2023
Montenegro	1	2024
Poland	1	2014
Spain	1	2021

=== By club ===
Club	Win(s) (outright wins/shared titles)	Year(s) (* title was shared)
Steaua București / FCSB	8 (7/1)	2014, 2015, 2016*, 2017, 2018, 2022*, 2024, 2025
CFR Cluj	3 (3/0)	2008, 2019, 2020
Gaz Metan Mediaș	2 (1/1)	2010, 2013*
Vaslui	2 (1/1)	2011, 2012*
Unirea Urziceni	1 (1/0)	2009
(Saudi Arabia) Al-Hilal	1 (0/1)	2012*
(Saudi Arabia) Al-Tai	1 (0/1)	2023*
Astra Giurgiu	1 (0/1)	2016*
Pandurii Târgu Jiu	1 (0/1)	2013*
Rapid București	1 (0/1)	2023*
Voluntari	1 (0/1)	2021*
Farul Constanța	1 (0/1)	2021*
FC U Craiova	1 (0/1)	2022*

== See also ==
- Gazeta Sporturilor Romanian Footballer of the Year
- Gazeta Sporturilor Romania Coach of the Year
- Gazeta Sporturilor Monthly Football Awards
