= Toma Niga =

Romanian footballer (born 1997)

Personal information
- Full name: Toma Marinică Niga
- Date of birth: 15 August 1997 (age 29)
- Place of birth: Frumosu, Romania
- Height: 1.87 m (6 ft 2 in)
- Position: Goalkeeper

Team information
- Current team: USV Iași

Youth career
- –2015: LPS Suceava

Senior career*
| Years | Team | Apps | (Gls) |
| 2013–2017 | Foresta Suceava | 47 | (0) |
| 2017–2022 | FCSB | 0 | (0) |
| 2017–2018 | → Academica Clinceni (loan) | 14 | (0) |
| 2018–2019 | → Hermannstadt (loan) | 8 | (0) |
| 2022–2024 | Foresta Suceava | 39 | (0) |
| 2024–2026 | Politehnica Iași | 11 | (0) |
| 2026– | USV Iași | 0 | (0) |
- * Club domestic league appearances and goals as of 2 May 2026

Toma Marinică Niga (born 15 August 1997) is a Romanian professional footballer who plays as a goalkeeper for Liga III club USV Iași.

== Honours ==
Hermannstadt

- Cupa României runner-up: 2017–18

FCSB

- Cupa României: 2019–20

Foresta Suceava

- Liga III: 2022–23
