= 2016–17 Cupa României =

Cupa României 2016–17
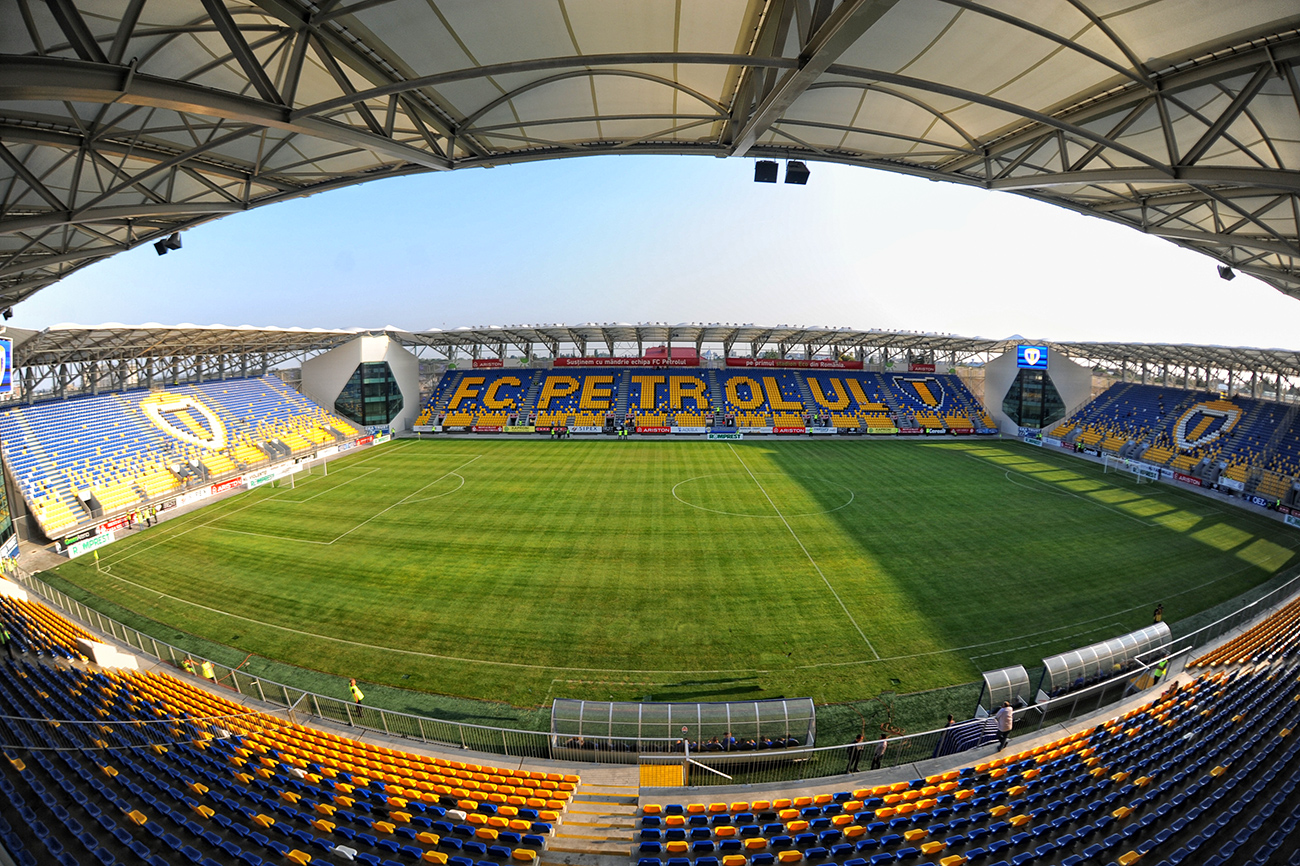

Tournament details
- Country: Romania
- Teams: 202

Final positions
- Champions: Voluntari
- Runners-up: Astra Giurgiu

The 2016–17 Cupa României was the seventy-ninth season of the annual Romanian primary football knockout tournament. The winner, Voluntari should qualify for the third qualifying round of the 2017–18 UEFA Europa League, but failed to obtain UEFA licence.

== Participating clubs ==
The following 155 teams qualified for the competition:

2015–16 Liga I all clubs	2015–16 Liga II all clubs	2015–16 Liga III all clubs
Astra Giurgiu; Steaua București; Pandurii Târgu Jiu; Dinamo București; Viitorul Constanța; ASA Târgu Mureș; CSM Politehnica Iași; Universitatea Craiova; Botoșani; CFR Cluj; Concordia Chiajna; Voluntari; ACS Poli Timișoara; Petrolul Ploiești	Rapid București; Gaz Metan Mediaș; UTA Arad; Dunărea Călărași; Chindia Târgoviște; Dacia Unirea Brăila; Bacău; Mioveni; Farul Constanța; Brașov; Academica Clinceni; Baia Mare; Râmnicu Vâlcea; Balotești; Șoimii Pâncota; Berceni; Olimpia Satu Mare; Gloria Buzău; Foresta Suceava; Universitatea Cluj; Unirea Tărlungeni; Bucovina Pojorâta; Ceahlăul Piatra Neamț; Metalul Reșița	Sepsi OSK; Luceafărul Oradea; Juventus București; ASU Politehnica Timișoara; Afumați; Olimpia Râmnicu Sărat; Delta Dobrogea Tulcea; Avântul Reghin; Performanța Ighiu; SCM Pitești; Metalurgistul Cugir; Voluntari II; Știința Miroslava; Industria Galda de Jos; Metaloglobus București; Petrotub Roman; Unirea Jucu; Național Sebiș; Sporting Turnu Măgurele; Unirea Slobozia; FK Miercurea Ciuc; Metalosport Galați; FC Hunedoara; Muscelul Câmpulung; Viitorul Domnești; Sporting Liești; Cetate Deva; Sănătatea Cluj; Concordia II Chiajna; Înainte Modelu; Măgura Cisnădie; Aerostar Bacău; Comuna Recea; Sporting Roșiori; Petrolistul Boldești; Pandurii II Târgu Jiu; Atletic Bradu; CS Iernut; CSM Pașcani; Viitorul II Constanța; CSM Lugoj; CS Ștefănești; CS Panciu; Oșorhei; Dinamo II București; Nuova Mama Mia Becicherecu Mic; CS Podari; Unirea Dej; Inter Dorohoi; CSM Oltenița; CS Ineu; FC Aninoasa; Sighetu Marmației; Gloria Popești-Leordeni; Atletico Vaslui; Inter Olt Slatina; Universitatea II Craiova; AFC Odorheiu Secuiesc; CS Tunari; Bucovina Rădăuți; FC Zalău; Millenium Giarmata; Voința Snagov; Urban Titu; FC Zagon; CSO Filiași; Minerul Motru; AFC Hărman; Cetatea Târgu Neamț; Luceafărul Bălan; Callatis Mangalia
42 representatives of regional associations^{1}
Viitorul Sântimbru (Alba); Șoimii Lipova (Arad); Unirea Bascov (Argeș); Gauss Răcăciuni (Bacău); FC Hidișelul de Sus (Bihor); FC Bistrița (Bistrița-Năsăud); Transdor Tudora (Botoșani); Chimia Victoria (Brașov); Sportul Chiscani (Brăila); Electroaparataj București (Bucharest); Voința Lanuri (Buzău); Voința Lupac (Caraș-Severin); Victoria Chirnogi (Călărași); IS Câmpia Turzii (Cluj)	Victoria Mihai Viteazu (Constanța); FC Păpăuți (Covasna); Flacăra Moreni (Dâmbovița); Știința Bechet (Dolj); Gloria Ivești (Galați); Arsenal Malu (Giurgiu); Internațional Bălești (Gorj); Unirea Cristuru Secuiesc (Harghita); Șoimul Băița (Hunedoara); Abatorul Slobozia (Ialomița); Siretul Lespezi (Iași); CSO Bragadiru (Ilfov); Viitorul Ulmeni (Maramureș); Pandurii Cerneți (Mehedinți)	Târnava Mică Sângeorgiu de Pădure (Mureș); Voința Ion Creangă (Neamț); CSS Slatina (Olt); CS Păulești (Prahova); Someșul Oar (Satu Mare); Unirea Mirșid (Sălaj); FC Avrig (Sibiu); Șomuzul Preutești (Suceava); Unirea Brânceni (Teleorman); CS Ghiroda (Timiș); Pescărușul Sarichioi (Tulcea); Vitis Șuletea (Vaslui); Posada Perișani (Vâlcea); Euromania Dumbrăveni (Vrancea)

== Preliminary rounds ==
The first rounds, and any preliminaries, are organised by the Regional Leagues.

== First round ==
All matches were played on 10 August 2016.

Team 1	Score	Team 2
10 August 2016
CSO Bragadiru (4)	1–4	Dinamo II București (3)
Electroaparataj București (4)	7–1	Voința Snagov (3)
CS Tunari (3)	2–3	Concordia II Chiajna (3)
Arsenal Malu (3)	0–2	Urban Titu (3)
Unirea Bascov (4)	2–1	Atletic Bradu (3)
Unirea Brânceni (4)	3–1	Sporting Roșiori (3)
Flacăra Moreni (3)	2–0	FC Aninoasa (3)
Știința Bechet (4)	0–2	CS Podari (3)
CSS Slatina (4)	0–2	CSO Filiași (3)
Posada Perișani (4)	3–1	Universitatea II Craiova (3)
Internațional Bălești (4)	3–1	Pandurii II Târgu Jiu (3)
FC Avrig (4)	2–0	AFC Odorheiu Secuiesc (3)
Târnava Mică Sângeorgiu (4)	3–6	CS Iernut (3)
Chimia Victoria (4)	1–5	AFC Hărman (3)
Unirea Cristuru Secuiesc (4)	w/o	Măgura Cisnădie (4)
IS Câmpia Turzii (4)	3–1	Unirea Dej (3)
Viitorul Sântimbru (4)	1–2	Sănătatea Cluj (3)
Voința Lupac (4)	2–3	Nuova Mama Mia Becicherecu Mic (3)
Șoimul Băița (4)	1–3	Millenium Giarmata (3)
CS Ghiroda (4)	4–2 (a.e.t.)	CSM Lugoj (3)
Șoimii Lipova (4)	3–0	CS Oșorhei (3)
Viitorul Ulmeni (3)	0–3	Comuna Recea (3)
Unirea Mirșid (4)	1–3	FC Zalău (3)
Transdor Tudora (4)	w/o	Inter Dorohoi (–)
Șomuzul Preutești (4)	1–0	FC Bistrița (3)
Siretul Lespezi (4)	w/o	CSM Pașcani (3)
Vitis Șuletea (4)	1–8	Aerostar Bacău (3)
Gloria Ivești (4)	1–4	Atletico Vaslui (3)
Voința Ion Creangă (4)	w/o	CS Panciu (–)
Euromania Dumbrăveni (4)	1–1 (a.e.t.) (7–6 p)	Gauss Răcăciuni (4)
FC Păpăuți (4)	3–4	Petrolistul Boldești (3)
Voința Lanurile (4)	3–4	CS Păulești (4)
Sportul Chiscani (3)	2–6	Viitorul II Constanța (3)
Victoria Mihai Viteazu (4)	2–1	Pescărușul Sarichioi (4)
Abatorul Slobozia (4)	0–3	Înainte Modelu (3)
Victoria Chirnogi (4)	1–2	CSM Oltenița (3)
Gloria Popești-Leordeni (3)	w/o	CS Ștefănești (–)
Pandurii Cerneți (–)	w/o	Minerul Motru (–)
Someșul Oar (4)	w/o	CSM Sighetu Marmaţiei (4)
FC Hidișelul de Sus (–)	w/o	CS Ineu (4)

== Second round ==
All matches were played on 24 August 2016.

Team 1	Score	Team 2
24 August 2016
CS Iernut (3)	1–5	FK Miercurea Ciuc (3)
Atletico Vaslui (3)	0–3	Sporting Liești (3)
Unirea Slobozia (3)	1–0	Delta Dobrogea Tulcea (3)
CSO Filiași (3)	3–1	CS Podari (3)
Euromania Dumbrăveni (4)	0–2	Aerostar Bacău (3)
FC Avrig (4)	1–2	Avântul Reghin (3)
Posada Perișani (4)	w/o	Minerul Motru (–)
Internațional Bălești (4)	w/o	Caransebeș (–)
CNS Cetate Deva (3)	w/o	Hunedoara (–)
Unirea Brânceni (4)	w/o	Sporting Turnu Măgurele (–)
Unirea Bascov (4)	1–3	Pitești (3)
AFC Hărman (3)	w/o	Muscelul Câmpulung (–)
Flacăra Moreni (3)	3–2	Petrolistul Boldești (3)
CS Păulești (4)	3–1	Urban Titu (3)
Electroaparataj București (4)	0–2	Dinamo II București (3)
Viitorul Domnești (3)	1–0	Metalul Reșița (2)
Gloria Popești-Leordeni (3)	5–1	Concordia II Chiajna (3)
FC Zalău (3)	4–3	Unirea Jucu (3)
Someșul Oar (4)	0–12	Comuna Recea (3)
Unirea Cristuru Secuiesc (4)	0–3	Olimpia Râmnicu Sărat (3)
Șomuzul Preutești (4)	1–4	Știința Miroslava (3)
CSM Roman (3)	w/o	Bucovina Pojorâta (–)
Victoria Mihai Viteazu (4)	1–5	Înainte Modelu (3)
CSM Oltenița (3)	1–4	Viitorul II Constanța (3)
Șoimii Lipova (4)	3–2 (a.e.t.)	Millenium Giarmata (3)
CS Ghiroda (4)	0–3	Național Sebiș (3)
CS Ineu (4)	1–6	Nuova Mama Mia Becicherecu Mic (3)
IS Câmpia Turzii (4)	1–4	Performanța Ighiu (3)
Metalurgistul Cugir (3)	w/o	Universitatea Cluj (4)
Metaloglobus București (3)	0–3	Voluntari II (3)
Voința Ion Creangă (4)	1–1 (a.e.t.) (5–6 p)	Metalosport Galați (3)
Sănătatea Cluj (3)	1–3	Industria Galda de Jos (3)
Transdor Tudora (4)	3–2	CSM Pașcani (3)

== Third round ==
All matches were played on 13 and 14 September 2016.

Team 1	Score	Team 2
13 September 2016
FK Miercurea Ciuc (3)	0–1	Foresta Suceava (2)
Dinamo II București (3)	4–0	Înainte Modelu (3)
AFC Hărman (3)	0–2	Pitești (3)
Nuova Mama Mia Becicherecu Mic (3)	3–2	Industria Galda de Jos (3)
Șoimii Lipova (4)	1–3 (a.e.t.)	CNS Cetate Deva (3)
Comuna Recea (3)	0–3	Metalurgistul Cugir (3)
Unirea Brânceni (4)	0–3	CSO Filiași (3)
14 September 2016
Aerostar Bacău (3)	2–2 (a.e.t.) (5–4 p)	Sporting Liești (3)
FC Zalău (3)	1–1 (a.e.t.) (1–3 p)	Avântul Reghin (3)
Internațional Bălești (4)	1–1 (a.e.t.) (5–4 p)	Posada Perișani (4)
Transdor Tudora (4)	1–2	Metalosport Galați (3)
CSM Roman (3)	0–2	Știința Miroslava (3)
Național Sebiș (3)	3–2	Performanța Ighiu (3)
CS Păulești (4)	3–0	Flacăra Moreni (3)
Viitorul II Constanța (3)	0–3	Unirea Tărlungeni (2)
Unirea Slobozia (3)	0–1	CS Afumați (2)
Gloria Popești-Leordeni (3)	3–0	Olimpia Râmnicu Sărat (3)
Viitorul Domnești (3)	5–3	FC Voluntari II (3)

== Fourth round ==
The matches were to be played on 4, 5 and 6 October 2016.

Team 1	Score	Team 2
4 October 2016
Dinamo II București (3)	2–0	Dunărea Călărași (2)
Juventus București (2)	0–2	Academica Clinceni (2)
ASU Politehnica Timișoara (2)	6–1	Șoimii Pâncota (2)
Aerostar Bacău (3)	0–1	Foresta Suceava (2)
Nuova Mama Mia Becicherecu Mic (3)	2–1	UTA Arad (2)
Avântul Reghin (3)	0–3	Olimpia Satu Mare (2)
Gloria Popești-Leordeni (3)	0–1	CS Balotești (2)
Național Sebiș (3)	0–2	Luceafărul Oradea (2)
Metalosport Galați (3)	1–0	SC Bacău (3)
Internațional Bălești (4)	0–0 (a.e.t.) (1–3 p)	CNS Cetate Deva (3)
5 October 2016
Sepsi OSK (2)	5–1	FC Brașov (2)
CS Afumați (2)	3–1	ACS Berceni (2)
Pitești (3)	1–4	Chindia Târgoviște (2)
Știința Miroslava (3)	1–3 (a.e.t.)	Dacia Unirea Brăila (2)
Viitorul Domnești (3)	2–3	Unirea Tărlungeni (2)
Metalurgistul Cugir (3)	w/o	FCM Baia Mare (2)
6 October 2016
CS Păulești (4)	0–2	CS Mioveni (2)
ACSO Filiași (3)	1–1 (a.e.t.) (4–5 p)	CSM Râmnicu Vâlcea (2)

== Round of 32 ==
The matches were played on 25, 26 and 27 October 2016.

25 October 2016	Râmnicu Vâlcea (2)	0–1	CFR Cluj (1)	Râmnicu Vâlcea
14:30		Report	Omrani 11'	Stadium: Municipal; Attendance: 1,500; Referee: Adrian Illyeș (Ploiești)

25 October 2016	Metalosport Galați (3)	0–1	Luceafărul Oradea (2)	Galați
14:30		Report	Arnăutu 60' (pen.)	Stadium: Nicolae Rainea; Attendance: 100; Referee: Andrei Chivulete (Bucharest)

25 October 2016	ASU Politehnica Timișoara (2)	0–3	Pandurii Târgu Jiu (1)	Timișoara
18:00		Report	Alexandru 39'; Obodo 48'; Bunoza 11'	Stadium: Dan Păltinișanu; Attendance: 3,500; Referee: Denis Haidiner (Hunedoara)

25 October 2016	Sepsi OSK (2)	0–1 (a.e.t.)	Universitatea Craiova (1)	Brașov
20:45		Report	Ivan 100'	Stadium: Silviu Ploeșteanu; Attendance: 3,000; Referee: Dan Botescu (Bucharest)

26 October 2016	Unirea Tărlungeni (2)	0–5	ASA Târgu Mureș (1)	Ștefăneștii de Jos
13:00		Report	Rus 9', 51', 65'; Ioniță 41'; Deaconu 57'	Stadium: Dumitru Mătărău; Attendance: 150; Referee: Laurențiu Ionașcu (Buzău)

26 October 2016	Cetate Deva (3)	1–7	Gaz Metan Mediaș (1)	Deva
14:30	Tecsi 21'	Report	Bic 42' (pen.), 57'; Danci 45+2'; Axente 52', 59'; Zaharia 79'; Buziuc 86'	Stadium: Cetate; Attendance: 500; Referee: Marian Balaci (Turnu Severin)

26 October 2016	Academica Clinceni (2)	1–5	Voluntari (1)	Clinceni
14:30	Gheorghe 17'	Report	Bălan 15', 32'; Cernat 29' (pen.); Deac 63', 71'	Stadium: Clinceni Arena; Attendance: 200; Referee: Ionuț Coza (Cernica)

26 October 2016	Dacia Unirea Brăila (2)	1–0	Concordia Chiajna (1)	Brăila
14:30	Neagu 31' (pen.)	Report		Stadium: Municipal; Attendance: 400; Referee: Iulian Dima (Bucharest)

26 October 2016	Metalurgistul Cugir (3)	0–2	CSM Poli Iași (1)	Cugir
14:30		Report	Frăsinescu 52'; Cristea 62'	Stadium: Arena CSO; Attendance: 700; Referee: Iulian Călin (Ștefănești)

26 October 2016	Olimpia Satu Mare (2)	1–3	Mioveni (2)	Satu Mare
14:30	Ludușan 87'	Report	Popa 46'; Ayza 59'; Rădescu 68'	Stadium: Olimpia; Attendance: 250; Referee: Florin Marcu (Oradea)

26 October 2016	Chindia Târgoviște (2)	0–2	ACS Poli Timișoara (1)	Mioveni
18:00		Report	Doman 30', 54'	Stadium: Orășenesc; Attendance: 300; Referee: Eduard Ioniță (Constanța)

26 October 2016	Dinamo II București (3)	1–2	Dinamo București (1)	Bucharest
21:00	Tîrcoveanu 65'	Report	Groza 55' (o.g.); Petre 79'	Stadium: Dinamo; Attendance: 200; Referee: Horia Mladinovici (Bucharest)

27 October 2016	Afumați (2)	1–0	Botoșani (1)	Afumați
14:30	Olariu 39'	Report		Stadium: Comunal; Attendance: 600; Referee: Andrei Antonie (Bucharest)

27 October 2016	NMM Becicherecu Mic (3)	0–1	Astra Giurgiu (1)	Timișoara
16:00		Report	V. Gheorghe 29'	Stadium: Dan Păltinișanu; Attendance: 150; Referee: Florin Mazilu (Satu Mare)

27 October 2016	Balotești (2)	0–4	Viitorul Constanța (1)	Ovidiu
18:45		Report	Hodorogea 14'; Nimely 23', 35'; Vînă 79'	Stadium: Viitorul; Attendance: 150; Referee: Florin Andrei (Târgu Mureș)

27 October 2016	Foresta Suceava (2)	1–2	Steaua București (1)	Suceava
21:30	Matei 18'	Report	O. Popescu 9'; Aganović 47'	Stadium: Areni; Attendance: 9,000; Referee: Robert Dumitru (Sfântu Gheorghe)

== Round of 16 ==
The matches were played on 13, 14 and 15 December 2016.

13 December 2016	Afumați (2)	0–3	ACS Poli Timișoara (1)	Afumați
13:30		Report	Drăghici 4'; Vădrariu 75'; Llorente 90'	Stadium: Comunal; Attendance: 150; Referee: Florin Mazilu (Satu Mare)

13 December 2016	Dacia Unirea Brăila (2)	0–2	Universitatea Craiova (1)	Buzău
17:30		Report	Surugiu 7'; Petre 90+3'	Stadium: Municipal; Attendance: 1,000; Referee: Lucian Rusandu (Sfântu Gheorghe)

13 December 2016	CFR Cluj (1)	2–0	CSM Politehnica Iași (1)	Cluj-Napoca
20:30	Bud 6'; Roman 73'	Report		Stadium: Dr. Constantin Rădulescu; Attendance: 500; Referee: Florin Andrei (Târgu Mureș)

14 December 2016	Voluntari (1)	3–0	ASA Târgu Mureș (1)	Buftea
17:30	Popadiuc 42'; Cazan 56'; Căpățînă 79'	Report		Stadium: CNAF; Attendance: 35; Referee: Andrei Antonie (Bucharest)

14 December 2016	Mioveni (2)	1–1 (a.e.t.) (5–4 p)	Steaua București (1)	Mioveni
20:30	Nilă 95'	Report	Achim 114'	Stadium: Orășenesc; Attendance: 6,000; Referee: István Kovács (Carei)
	Penalties
	Năstăsie (penalty missed); Ayza (penalty scored); Stoica (penalty scored); Nilă (penalty scored); Gugu (penalty scored); Boboc (penalty scored)		(penalty missed) Boldrin; (penalty scored) Achim; (penalty scored) Pintilii; (penalty scored) Popescu; (penalty scored) Moke; (penalty missed) De Amorim

15 December 2016	Luceafărul Oradea (2)	1–3	Astra Giurgiu (1)	Oradea
13:30	Cigan 40'	Report	Morais 33'; Niculae 68'; Hlinca 89' (o.g.)	Stadium: Iuliu Bodola; Attendance: 4,100; Referee: Denis Haidiner (Hunedoara)

15 December 2016	Viitorul Constanța (1)	3–0	Pandurii Târgu Jiu (1)	Ovidiu
17:30	Iancu 30'; Vînă 61'; Purece 66'	Report		Stadium: Viitorul; Attendance: 200; Referee: Iulian Dima (Bucharest)

15 December 2016	Gaz Metan Mediaș (1)	1–3	Dinamo București (1)	Mediaș
20:30	Axente 67'	Report	Romera 60'; Buzean 78' (o.g.); Nistor 90+3'	Stadium: Gaz Metan; Attendance: 2,500; Referee: Adrian Comănescu (Râmnicu Vâlcea)

== Quarter-finals ==
The matches were played on 28, 29, and 30 March 2017.

28 March 2017	ACS Poli Timișoara (1)	0–0 (a.e.t.) (6–5 p)	CFR Cluj (1)	Timișoara
20:30		Report		Stadium: Dan Păltinișanu; Attendance: 2,000; Referee: Adrian Cojocaru (Galați)
	Penalties
	Drăghici (penalty scored); Fuček (penalty scored); Străuț (penalty missed); Šoljić (penalty scored); Bărbuț (penalty scored); Scutaru (penalty scored); Neagu (penalty scored)		(penalty scored) Nascimento; (penalty scored) Tiago Lopes; (penalty scored) Gomelt; (penalty missed) Larie; (penalty scored) Omrani; (penalty scored) Bud; (penalty missed) Deac

29 March 2017	Mioveni (2)	1–2	Voluntari (1)	Mioveni
18:30	Neagoe 35'	Report	Cernat 13'; Deac 90'	Stadium: Orășenesc; Attendance: Iulian Dima (Bucharest); Referee: 4,000

29 March 2017	Universitatea Craiova (1)	0–0 (a.e.t.) (6–5 p)	Dinamo București (1)	Drobeta-Turnu Severin
21:30		Report		Stadium: Municipal; Attendance: 10,000; Referee: Ovidiu Hațegan (Arad)
	Penalties
	Gustavo (penalty scored); Briceag (penalty scored); Bancu (penalty scored); Screciu (penalty missed); Calancea (penalty scored); Kelić (penalty scored); Ivan (penalty scored)		(penalty scored) Hanca; (penalty missed) Petre; (penalty scored) Bušuladžić; (penalty scored) Nistor; (penalty scored) Filip; (penalty scored) Popa; (penalty missed) Spătaru

30 March 2017	Viitorul Constanța (1)	1–3	Astra Giurgiu (1)	Ovidiu
21:00	Morar 61'	Report	Seto 40'; Budescu 44' (pen.); Florea 85'	Stadium: Viitorul; Attendance: 2,500; Referee: Marcel Bîrsan (Bucharest)

== Semi-finals ==
The semi-final matches are played in a round-trip system. The first legs were played on 25 and 27 April 2017 and the return legs will be played on 17 and 18 May 2017.

Team 1	Agg.	Team 2	1st leg	2nd leg
Astra Giurgiu (1)	7–1	ACS Poli Timișoara (1)	4–1	3–0
Universitatea Craiova (1)	0–1	Voluntari (1)	0–1	0–0

=== 1st leg ===
25 April 2017	Astra Giurgiu (1)	4–1	ACS Poli Timișoara (1)	Giurgiu
20:00	Budescu 4' (pen.), 52'; Săpunaru 36'; Ioniță 76'	Report	Popovici 9'	Stadium: Marin Anastasovici; Attendance: 2,000; Referee: Adrian Comănescu (Rm.Vâlcea)

27 April 2017	Universitatea Craiova (1)	0–1	Voluntari (1)	Drobeta-Turnu Severin
20:30		Report	Marinescu 89' (pen.)	Stadium: Municipal; Attendance: 2,000; Referee: Horațiu Feșnic (Cluj-Napoca)

=== 2nd leg ===
17 May 2017	ACS Poli Timișoara (1)	0–3 (1–7 agg.)	Astra Giurgiu (1)	Timișoara
		Report	Budescu 40'; Buș 49'; Nicoară 83'	Stadium: Dan Păltinișanu; Attendance: 300; Referee: Iulian Calin (Ștefănești)

18 May 2017	Voluntari (1)	0–0 (1–0 agg.)	Universitatea Craiova (1)	Chiajna
		Report		Stadium: Concordia; Attendance: 4,500; Referee: Marius Avram (Bucharest)

== Final ==
27 May 2017	Voluntari (1)	1–1 (a.e.t.) (5–3 p)	Astra Giurgiu (1)	Ploiești
19:45	Marinescu 84' (pen.)	Report	Ioniță 35'	Stadium: Ilie Oană; Attendance: 9,274; Referee: István Kovács (Carei)
	Penalties
	Bălan (penalty scored); Marinescu (penalty scored); Voduț (penalty scored); Ivanovici (penalty scored); Achim (penalty scored)		(penalty scored) Fabrício; (penalty scored) Săpunaru; (penalty scored) Seto; (penalty missed) Stan

Cupa României 2016–17 winners

1st title
