= Dănuț =

Dănuț is a Romanian male given name, typically a nickname for Daniel or Dan, and may refer to:

- Dănuț Borbil (born 1973), professional Romanian armwrestler, current national champion for the left arm, vice-champion for the right arm
- Dănuț Coman (born 1979), former Romanian goalkeeper
- Dănuț Dobre (born 1967), retired Romanian rower
- Ioan Dănuț Dovalciuc (born 1984), Romanian bobsledder from Suceava who has competed since 2005
- Dănuț Dumbravă (born 1981), former Romanian rugby union footballer and current head coach of CSA Steaua București
- Dănuț Grecu (born 1950), retired Romanian artistic gymnast who specialized in rings
- Dănuț Lupu (born 1967), Romanian former football midfielder and former Hockey player in his childhood
- Dănuț Marcu (born 1952), Romanian mathematician and computer scientist
- Dănuț Matei, (born 1966), Romanian former professional footballer
- Dănuț Moisescu (born 1972), retired Romanian football midfielder
- Dănuț Moldovan (born 1991), Austrian and former Romanian bobsledder
- Dănuț Oprea (born 1972), retired Romanian football player and currently manager
- Dănuț Perjă (born 1974), former Romanian football defender
- Dănuț Pop (born 1968), Romanian judoka
- Dănuț Prodan (born 1985), Romanian former footballer
- Dănuț Sabou (born 1979), retired Romanian football midfielder
- Dănuț Șomcherechi (born 1973), Romanian former football player and currently a manager
