= Sergiu Mândrean =

Romanian footballer

Sergiu Mîndrean
Personal information
- Full name: Sergiu Sebastian Mândrean
- Date of birth: 18 October 1978 (age 48)
- Place of birth: Luduș, Romania
- Height: 1.72 m (5 ft 8 in)
- Position: Right back

Team information
- Current team: Gloria Bistrița (U19 Coach)

Senior career*
Years	Team	Apps	(Gls)
1995–2006	Gloria Bistrița	151	(9)
2006–2009	Pandurii Târgu Jiu	41	(0)
2009–2010	Gloria Buzău	22	(1)
2010–2011	Voința Livezile	2	(0)
2011–2012	ProSomeș Feldru	6	(9)
2012	Progresul Năsăud	12	(2)
2012–2013	ACS Dumitra	11	(1)
2013–2016	FC Bistrița	40	(5)
2016	Voința Livezile	5	(2)
2017–2018	ACS Dumitra	38	(4)
2019	Viitorul Ulmeni	7	(0)
2019–2020	Voința Mărișelu	0	(0)
Total		335	(33)

Managerial career
- 2013–2015: FC Bistrița
- 2020–: Gloria Bistrița (U19)
- * Club domestic league appearances and goals as of 26 June 2017

Sergiu Sebastian Mândrean (born 18 October 1978) is a Romanian retired professional football player who played as a right back for teams such as Gloria Bistrița, Pandurii Târgu Jiu, Gloria Buzău, FC Bistrița or ACS Dumitra, among others.
