= CS Gloria Bistrița (football) =

Romanian football club

Gloria Bistrița
- Full name: Clubul Sportiv Gloria Bistrița
- Nicknames: Glorioșii (The Glorious Ones); Vampirii albaștri (The Blue Vampires); Echipa lui Dracula (Dracula's Squad)
- Short name: Gloria
- Founded: 31 May 2018; 8 years ago as 1. FC Gloria Bistrița
- Ground: Jean Pădureanu
- Capacity: 7,800
- Owners: Bistrița-Năsăud County Council; Bistrița Municipality
- General manager: Bogdan Apostu
- Head coach: Sebastian Moga
- League: Liga II
- 2025–26: Liga II; Regular season: 14th of 22; Play-out, Group A: 5th of 7
- Website: https://gloria2018.ro/
Home colours	Away colours

Clubul Sportiv Gloria Bistrița, commonly known as Gloria Bistrița or simply as Gloria, is a professional football club based in Bistrița, Bistrița-Năsăud County, competing in Liga II, the second tier of Romanian football.

Founded in 2018 as 1. FC Gloria Bistrița, the team is widely regarded as the unofficial successor of ACF Gloria Bistrița, sharing its name, white and blue colors, stadium, and former staff and players. In 2021, the club was taken over by the Bistrița-Năsăud County Council, renamed Gloria Bistrița-Năsăud, and changed its colors to black and red. In 2025, following its promotion to Liga II, the club dropped "Năsăud" from its name to strengthen its identity and align more closely with the Municipality of Bistrița. Gloria reached the quarter-finals of the Cupa României in the 2025–26 season.

== History ==
Following the bankruptcy of ACF Gloria Bistrița in 2015, football in the city sought revival through FC Bistrița and Academia Gloria Bistrița. However, both projects were short-lived due to financial difficulties, dissolving in 2017 and 2018, respectively.

Former logo, used between 2018 and 2021

1. FC Gloria Bistrița was founded on 31 May 2018 and directly enrolled in Liga III, taking the place of newly promoted ACS Dumitra. The latter ceded its spot and right to compete in the third tier, along with all its players, administrative and technical staff, to the newly established club. Simultaneously, ACS Dumitra enrolled in Liga IV Bistrița-Năsăud County and became the official second team and partner of 1. FC Gloria.

The club is widely regarded as the unofficial successor of the historic club by supporters, the media, and by the club itself, which has embraced this legacy. It shares a similar name, the same white and blue colors, plays at the same stadium, and includes former directors, managers, and players from the original club, further reinforcing the continuity between the two entities.

In the following three seasons, under the guidance of Dănuț Matei and featuring experienced top-flight players such as Costin, Chibulcutean, Nalați, Lőrincz, Stoianof, Curtuiuș, Albuț, and Enescu, 1. FC Gloria finished 9th in Series V of the 2018-19 Liga III season. In the 2019–20 season, which was interrupted in March 2020 due to the COVID-19 pandemic, the team placed 7th in the same series. During the 2020–21 season, competing in Series X, Gloria achieved a 3rd-place finish.

Former logo, used between 2021 and 2025

In the summer of 2021, 1. FC Gloria, facing financial collapse, was taken over by the Bistrița-Năsăud County Council and renamed Gloria 2018 Bistrița-Năsăud. In the 2021–22 season, the team competed in Series IX of Liga III, finishing 5th in both the regular season and the play-out round, with Adrian Falub taking charge in February 2022.

In the 2022–23 campaign, playing in Series X, Gloria finished 3rd in the regular season and 2nd in the play-off round, thus qualifying for the promotion play-off, where it was eliminated in the first round by Corvinul Hunedoara (1–2 at home and 1–2 away). During the 2023–24 season, the club once again qualified for the promotion play-off after winning Series IX, but was knocked out in the first round by Unirea Ungheni (2–2 at home and 1–2 away).

Named in June as the new head coach, Iosif Rotariu parted ways with the club just a month later. In his place, Cristian Pustai was appointed as head coach for the 2024–25 season. With a core of players including R. Avram, Began, Mitran, Salka, Chukwu, Mogoș, Burdeț, Vișinar, Vencu, Llullaku (cpt.), V. Alexandru, Tonini, Cristea, Covaci, Rafael Tavares, Chiorean, Forizs, Buziuc, Andraș and G. Deac, the White and Blues dominated Series VII, securing qualification for the promotion play-off. After advancing past Filiași, who was disqualified, Gloria earned promotion to Liga II with a 1–0 home victory and a dramatic second leg against Râmnicu Vâlcea, which ended 2–3 after extra time and 5–4 in the penalty shootout.

The 2025–26 Liga II season marked Gloria's first campaign in the second tier under the current club. A modest start to the season led to the dismissal of coach Cristian Pustai after five rounds, with Nicolae Grigore appointed as his replacement. Gloria had already secured qualification for the Cupa României group stage under Pustai, and subsequently recorded its best run in the competition since the club's establishment, advancing from the group stage after victories over Sănătatea Cluj and UTA Arad, before being eliminated 2–3 after extra time by FC Argeș in the quarter-finals. The team finished 14th after the regular season and entered the play-out, where it secured its Liga II status, concluding the campaign with a 3–0 home victory over Câmpulung Muscel and finishing 5th in Group A.

== Grounds ==
CS Gloria Bistrița, like its predecessor, ACF Gloria Bistrița, plays its home matches on Jean Pădureanu Stadium in Bistrița, with a capacity of 7,800 seats. The stadium is named in honor of the longest-running president of a football club in Romania, Jean Pădureanu, the man who led the old Gloria for 47 years (1966–2013). A respected, but also a controversial character, the Lord, as he was called, managed to maintain the club in the Liga I for twenty-two consecutive years.

== Honours ==
Liga III

- Winners (2): 2023–24, 2024–25
- Runners-up (1): 2022–23

== Players ==
=== First-team squad ===
As of 19 October 2026

Note: Flags indicate national team as defined under FIFA eligibility rules; some limited exceptions apply. Players may hold more than one non-FIFA nationality.

No.	Pos.	Nation	Player
1	GK	ROU	Alexander Frunză
2	DF	ROU	Costyn Gheorghe (on loan from Farul Constanța)
3	DF	ROU	Dragoș Rîpeanu
5	DF	ROU	Darius Iurașciuc (on loan from UTA Arad)
6	MF	ROU	Viorel Lică (3rd captain)
8	MF	ROU	Antonio Bradu
7	FW	ROU	Marius Lupu
9	FW	NGR	Jimmy Otega
10	MF	ROU	Cătălin Șofroni
11	MF	ROU	Mihai Bara (on loan from Viitorul Cluj)
12	GK	ROU	Iosif Berințan
13	MF	CRO	Branimir Ćavar
17	FW	GHA	Emmanuel Mensah
18	DF	ROU	Patrik Năsăudean

No.	Pos.	Nation	Player
19	FW	MAD	Arnaud Randrianantenaina
20	MF	ROU	Antonio Suciu (on loan from Universitatea Cluj)
22	GK	ROU	Alexandru Greab (Captain)
24	DF	ROU	Sergiu Pîrvulescu (4th captain)
25	MF	GEO	Levan Osikmashvili
26	FW	NGR	Ibuchi Chukwu (on loan from Universitatea Cluj)
27	DF	GHA	Emmanuel Asibey
30	MF	ROU	Alexandru Mogoș
59	MF	BEL	Mehdi Lehaire (Vice-captain)
66	MF	ROU	Raul Kertes
77	MF	ROU	Patric Barabas
78	MF	ROU	Onișor Covaci
99	MF	ROU	Darius Grigore
—	MF	ROU	Cătălin Ciobănică

=== Dual registration ===
Note: Flags indicate national team as defined under FIFA eligibility rules; some limited exceptions apply. Players may hold more than one non-FIFA nationality.

No. / Pos. / Nation / Player; 16 / GK / ROU / Fabio Blaga (from Corvinul Hunedoara)	No. / Pos. / Nation / Player; 97 / FW / ROU / Denis Zanc (from Corvinul Hunedoara)

=== Out on loan ===
Note: Flags indicate national team as defined under FIFA eligibility rules; some limited exceptions apply. Players may hold more than one non-FIFA nationality.

No. / Pos. / Nation / Player; — / FW / ROU / Dănuț Covaci (to Unirea Alba Iulia until 30 June 2027)	No. / Pos. / Nation / Player; — / FW / ROU / Daniel Țăran (to Bradul Putna until 30 June 2027)

== Club Officials ==
=== Board of directors ===
Role	Name
Owners	(Romania) Bistrița-Năsăud County Council (Romania) Bistrița Municipality
President	(Romania) Eugen Cosma
Board President	(Romania) Ioan Mocan
General Manager	(Romania) Bogdan Apostu
Sporting Director	(Romania) Paul Șomodean
Technical Director	(Romania) Viorel Paraschiv
Team Manager	(Romania) Ioan Mironaș
Youth Center Manager	(Romania) Valer Someșan

=== Current technical staff ===
Role	Name
Head coach	(Romania) Sebastian Moga
Assistant coach	(Romania) George Neagu
Goalkeeping coach	(Romania) Călin Albuț
Fitness coach	(Romania) George Neagu
Masseur	(Romania) Daniel Dimofte

== League and cup history ==
Season	Tier	League	Regular season	Play-off / Play-out	Notes	Cupa României
2026–27	2	Liga II	TBD			TBD
2025–26	2	Liga II	14th	3rd (Group B play-out)		Quarter-finals
2024–25	3	Liga III (Series VII)	1st	1st (C) (play-off)	Promoted	Third round
2023–24	3	Liga III (Series IX)	1st	1st (C) (play-off)		Second round
2022–23	3	Liga III (Series X)	2nd	2nd (play-off)		Play-off round
2021–22	3	Liga III (Series IX)	5th	5th (play-out)		Third round
2020–21	3	Liga III (Series X)	3rd	–		Second round
2019–20	3	Liga III (Series V)	7th	–		Second round
2018–19	3	Liga III (Series V)	9th	–		Third round

== Notable former players ==
The footballers enlisted below have had international cap(s) for their respective countries at junior and/or senior level and/or significant caps for CS Gloria Bistrița.

Romania

- (Romania) Călin Albuț
- (Romania) Valentin Alexandru
- (Romania) Alin Chibulcutean
- (Romania) Sergiu Costin
- (Romania) Paul Chiorean
- (Romania) Marius Chindriș
- (Romania) Marius Curtuiuș
- (Romania) Gabriel Deac
- (Romania) Andrei Enescu
- (Romania) Costinel Gugu
- (Romania) József Lőrincz
- (Romania) Sergiu Mureșan
- (Romania) Adrian Nalați
- (Romania) Ionuț Panțîru
- (Romania) Ovidiu Stoianof
- (Romania) Bogdan Vasile

Albania

- (Albania) Azdren Llullaku

== Former managers ==
- (Romania) Dănuț Matei (2018–2021)
- (Romania) Adrian Falub (2022–2024)
- (Romania) Cristian Pustai (2024–2025)
- (Romania) Nicolae Grigore (2025–2026)
