= Prodan (disambiguation) =

Prodan is a South Slavic masculine given name.

Prodan may also refer to:

- Prodan (dye), a fluorescent dye used as a membrane probe
- Prodan, Elbasan, a village near Stëblevë, Albania
