= Pârâul Rău =

Pârâul Rău may refer to the following rivers in Romania:

- Pârâul Rău, a tributary of the Ghimbav in Argeș County
- Pârâul Rău, a tributary of the Ilișoara Mare in Mureș County
- Pârâul Rău, a tributary of the Olteț in Gorj County
- Pârâul Rău, a tributary of the Târzia in Neamț County
