= Adrian Nalați =

Romanian footballer

Personal information
- Date of birth: 21 May 1983 (age 43)
- Place of birth: Bistrița, România
- Height: 1.81 m (5 ft 11 in)
- Position: Midfielder

Youth career
- Gloria Bistriţa

Senior career*
Years	Team	Apps	(Gls)
1998–2001	Gloria Bistrița	3	(0)
2001–2003	Arezzo	9	(0)
2003	→ Perugia (loan)	0	(0)
2004	Isernia	5	(0)
2004–2008	Gloria Bistrița	74	(5)
2008–2010	Pandurii Târgu Jiu	8	(1)
2008–2009	→ Gloria Bistrița (loan)	26	(1)
2010–2011	Gloria Bistrița	18	(1)
2011–2013	Politehnica Iași	19	(0)
2013–2015	Gloria Bistriţa	16	(0)
2015–2016	Unirea Dej		
2016	FC Bistrița	9	(3)
2017	Unirea Dej	19	(0)
2018	Dumitra		
2018–2022	Gloria Bistrița	70	(13)
2022-2023	C.S. Silvicutorul Maieru	0	(3)
Total		276	(24)
- * Club domestic league appearances and goals as of 13:51, 20 December 2022 (UTC)

Adrian Nalaţi (born 21 May 1983) is a Romanian former professional football player who played as a midfielder for clubs such as ACF Gloria Bistrița, Arezzo, Politehnica Iași, Unirea Dej or Gloria Bistrița-Năsăud, among others.

== Early life and youth career ==
On May 21, 1983, Adrian Nalati was born in Romania. He had an obsession for football from an early age, and by when he was a teenager, he was an integral part of the youth team at ACF Gloria Bistrița, one of the largest football clubs in his native nation. He got picked for the senior squad due to his potential and his young achievements.

== Career in Professional ACF Gloria Bistrița ==
Nalaţ got his midfield debut at ACF Gloria Bistrița, where he began his senior career. Several teams in Romania and abroad took attention of him due to his performances at the club.
