= Pârâul Fagului =

Pârâul Fagului may refer to:

- Pârâul Fagului (Ilva)
- Pârâul Fagului (Bistrița)
