= Mehdi Lehaire =

Belgian footballer

Personal information
- Date of birth: 22 January 2000 (age 26)
- Place of birth: Mouscron, Belgium
- Height: 1.85 m (6 ft 1 in)
- Position: Midfielder

Team information
- Current team: Gloria Bistrița
- Number: 59

Youth career
- –2018: Lierse
- 2018: Utrecht

Senior career*
Years	Team	Apps	(Gls)
2017–2018	Lierse	2	(0)
2018–2020	Jong FC Utrecht	19	(1)
2020–2022	Miedź Legnica II	9	(1)
2020–2025	Miedź Legnica	88	(5)
2023	→ Resovia (loan)	14	(0)
2024–2025	→ Corvinul Hunedoara (loan)	24	(3)
2025–	Gloria Bistrița	27	(5)
- * Club domestic league appearances and goals as of 18 October 2026

Mehdi Lehaire (born 22 January 2000) is a Belgian professional footballer who plays as a midfielder for Liga II club Gloria Bistrița.

== Club career ==
He made his debut for the main squad of Lierse on 19 May 2017 in the Europa League play-off game against Standard Liège as a 57th-minute substitute for Othman Boussaid.

He made his Eerste Divisie debut for Jong FC Utrecht on 17 August 2018 in a game against Go Ahead Eagles as a 58th-minute substitute for Rayan El Azrak.

On 20 August 2020, he signed with Polish club Miedź Legnica and was initially assigned to the second team in the III liga. By mid-October, he was moved to the first team and made his I liga debut on 16 October 2020.

On 16 January 2023, he joined I liga side Resovia on loan until the end of the season.

On 29 August 2024, Lehaire was sent on a season-long loan to Romanian cup holders club Corvinul Hunedoara.

On 12 July 2025, Lehaire moved to Liga II newcomers Gloria Bistrița.

== Personal life ==
Born in Belgium, Lehaire is of Moroccan descent.

== Honours ==
Miedź Legnica

- I liga: 2021–22
