= Ibuchi Chukwu =

Nigerian footballer (born 2006)

Personal information
- Full name: Ibuchi Goodnews Chukwu Jr.
- Date of birth: 2 January 2006 (age 20)
- Place of birth: Port Harcourt, Nigeria
- Height: 1.92 m (6 ft 4 in)
- Position: Forward

Team information
- Current team: Gloria Bistrița (on loan from Universitatea Cluj)
- Number: 26

Youth career
- –2024: Jimmy Football Academy

Senior career*
Years	Team	Apps	(Gls)
2024–2025	Corvinul Hunedoara	12	(2)
2025	→ Gloria Bistrița (loan)	10	(1)
2025–2026	Gloria Bistrița	19	(3)
2026–	Universitatea Cluj	0	(0)
2026–	→ Gloria Bistrița (loan)	6	(2)
- * Club domestic league appearances and goals as of 1 November 2026

Ibuchi Goodnews Chukwu Jr. (born 2 January 2006) is a Nigerian professional footballer who plays as a forward for Liga II club Gloria Bistrița, on loan from Liga I club Universitatea Cluj.

== Career statistics ==
As of match played 1 November 2026

Appearances and goals by club, season and competition
Club	Season	League			Cupa României		Europe		Other		Total	
Club	Season	Division	Apps	Goals	Apps	Goals	Apps	Goals	Apps	Goals	Apps	Goals
Corvinul Hunedoara	2024–25	Liga II	12	2	2	0	1 (Note: Appearances in UEFA Conference League)	0	0	0	15	2
Gloria Bistrița (loan)	2024–25	Liga III	10	1	—		—		2 (Note: Appearances in Liga III promotion play-offs)	0	12	1
Gloria Bistrița	2025–26	Liga II	19	3	4	2	—		—		23	5
Universitatea Cluj	2026–27	Liga I	0	0	—		1 (Note: Appearance in UEFA Europa League)	0	0	0	1	0
Gloria Bistrița (loan)	2025–26	Liga II	6	2	1	0	—		—		7	2
Career total			47	8	7	2	2	0	0	0	56	10

== Honours ==
Corvinul Hunedoara

- Supercupa României runner-up: 2024

Gloria Bistrița

- Liga III: 2024–25

Universitatea Cluj

- Supercupa României runner-up: 2026
