= Tara (von Neudorf) =

Tara (von Neudorf) (born 1974 in Luduș, Transylvania) is a contemporary Romanian artist.

== Life ==
He studied in the Faculty of Printmaking and then in the Faculty of Painting at the Art and Design University of Cluj-Napoca. Since 2005 he has been connected with Anaid Art Gallery in Bucharest, which has organised major exhibitions of his work: “Black Rumania” (2005), “Finis Mundi” (2007), “Generation Djihad” (2009), and “Raving History” (2012). He has also had shows abroad, in countries including the Netherlands, Germany, the USA and Hungary. In 2012 he was awarded the Strabag Artaward International and an exhibition of his works was held in Vienna. His first show in Poland, "Cartographer of Sinister History. Tara (von Neudorf)", was staged in 2013 by the Gallery of the International Cultural Centre in Krakow (4 September – 24 November 2013). Tara lives and works in Sibiu i Bukareszcie. and Bucharest. He is currently in the process of creating a monumental installation about the history of the Transylvanian Saxons – "the end of the nation" – in the Lutheran church in the abandoned village of Mighindoala (Engenthal) in Transylvanian Saxony; he is also hoping to set himself up a studio there.

== Work ==
Tara (von Neudorf) is one of a group of young Romanian artists who contest the traditional brand of art represented by the country's Union of Visual Artists. In the late 1990s they turned to non-public forums for the freedom of artistic expression they sought. The themes addressed by these artists are, in the words of Diana Dochia:

"sensitive subjects pertaining to post-totalitarian Romanian society and [in the first place] issues such as sexuality, corruption, religion, war, and politicians. All these issues had been considered taboo during communist times […]. According to the communist criteria and mentalities, art was not supposed to challenge, intrigue or pose questions."

Tara's favourite media are black marker pen and red paint, and his best-known works are made on old communist-era schoolroom maps and educational posters.

His creative space is the "periphery" of Europe, but he also references the geopolitics of art. His work is suffused with the context of the place where he comes from and works – Transylvania. The local context is his starting point for his artistic narratives about identity, difficult history, the co-existence of cultures, unhealed wounds, and the emptiness of now depopulated towns and villages. The keywords on which his artistic work focuses are enunciated in one of the works in his famous series “Black Rumania”: corruption, poverty, communism, stupidity, racism, terror, lies, bureaucracy, disability, greed, and despair (RO, 2005). He comments on the relations between Romania and the European Union, teaches communist history, and lays bare the bloody pages of grand ideologies, using images such as maps, sacred books and religious symbols, flags, dates, places of torture and sites of martyrdom, tanks, media slogans, and blood. He talks about important, fundamental issues in strong strokes and decisive colours. Dr Monika Rydiger, one of the curators of Tara's exhibition in Krakow, Poland, says:

"The complexity of Tara's art is enhanced by his astonishing historical knowledge and awareness and his absolutely uncompromising stance on any kind of political manipulation and totalitarian strategies. His maps, with their remarkably powerful, expressive formal qualities, reveal this with redoubled force. The fact that Tara (von Neudorf) was born in Transylvania […] is not without significance. In the context of the confused and painful history of this region, his maps take on significance as a cartography of the quest for lost identity."

== Exhibitions ==
- 1999: "Last International Dada Exhibition of the 20th. Century", Berlin, "Galerie Kai Hilgemann"
- 2005: "Black Rumania", Anaid Art Gallery, Bucharest, curator: Diana Dochia
- 2007: "Finis Mundi", Anaid Art Gallery, Bucharest, curator: Diana Dochia
- 2009: “Generation Djihad”, Anaid Art Gallery, Bucharest, curator: Diana Dochia
- 2011: “Trans(a)gressie Millennium”, MODEM Modern és Kortárs Művészeti Központ, Debrecen, curator: Diana Dochia
- 2012: “Raving History”, Anaid Art Gallery, Bucharest, curator: Diana Dochia
- 2012: “In the name of…”, STRABAG Artlounge, Vienna
- 2013: "Cartographer of sinister history. Tara (von Neudorf)", Gallery of the International Cultural Centre in Krakow, curators: Monika Rydiger, Łukasz Galusek

== Bibliography ==
- Łukasz Galusek, "Tara terrible", Herito 2012, no. 6 (www.herito.pl)
- Kartograf złowrogiej historii. Tara (von Neudorf) / Tara (von Neudorf). Cartographer of sinister history, exh. cat., Międzynarodowe Centrum Kultury, Kraków 2013
