= Prodanović =

Prodanović is a Serbian surname, derived from the name Prodan. It may refer to:

- Boško Prodanović (born 1943), former Bosnian footballer
- Jaša Prodanović, former minister for Serbia in Yugoslav government
- Ilija Prodanović (born 1979), Bosnian Serb footballer
- Milan Prodanović, Serbian basketball player
- Mileta Prodanović, Serbian author
- Miloš Prodanović, Serbian handball player
- Nenad Prodanović (born 1954), Serbian bobsledder
- Radivoj Prodanović, Serbian politician
- Rajko Prodanović (born 1986), Serbian handballer
- Vasilije Prodanović (born 1985), Serbian footballer
