= Ilișoara Mare =

- Location within Romania

Location
- Country: Romania
- Counties: Mureș County

Physical characteristics
- Mouth: Ilva
  - coordinates: 46.9952°N 25.1171°E
- Length: 14 km (8.7 mi)
- Basin size: 48 km^{2} (19 sq mi)

Basin features
- Progression: Ilva→ Mureș→ Tisza→ Danube→ Black Sea
- Tributaries
  - left: Cocoș
  - right: Pârâul Rău, Ursul Mare, Ilișoara Mică

The Ilișoara Mare is a left tributary of the river Ilva in Romania. It flows into the Ilva north of Lunca Bradului. Its length is 14 km (8.7 mi) and its basin size is 48 km^{2} (19 sq mi).
