= Marius Curtuiuș =

Romanian footballer

Personal information
- Full name: Marius Aurelian Curtuiuș
- Date of birth: August 8, 1989 (age 37)
- Place of birth: Bistrița, Romania
- Height: 1.80 m (5 ft 11 in)
- Position: Striker

Team information
- Current team: Silvicultorul Maieru
- Number: 21

Youth career
- Gloria Bistrița

Senior career*
Years	Team	Apps	(Gls)
2006–2007	Gloria II Bistrița	2	(2)
2007–2014	Gloria Bistrița	82	(15)
2009–2010	→ Râmnicu Vâlcea (loan)	2	(0)
2014–2015	Olt Slatina	17	(5)
2015–2018	UTA Arad	95	(34)
2018	CSMȘ Reșița	8	(0)
2019–2023	Gloria Bistrița	64	(35)
2023–	Silvicultorul Maieru	5	(6)
- * Club domestic league appearances and goals as of 13:34, 13 January 2024 (UTC)

Marius Aurelian Curtuiuș (born August 8, 1989) is a Romanian professional footballer who plays as a striker for Liga IV side Silvicultorul Maieru. In his career Curtuiuș played in the Liga I and Liga II for teams such as: Gloria Bistrița, Râmnicu Vâlcea, Olt Slatina and UTA Arad.
