= Gabriel Deac =

Romanian professional footballer

Personal information
- Full name: Gabriel Mihai Deac
- Date of birth: 26 April 1995 (age 31)
- Place of birth: Bistrița, Romania
- Height: 1.83 m (6 ft 0 in)
- Position: Midfielder

Youth career
- CSM Bistrița
- Școala de Fotbal Viorel Moldovan
- –2012: LPS Bistrița
- 2012–2014: Gheorghe Hagi Academy

Senior career*
Years	Team	Apps	(Gls)
2014–2019	Voluntari	115	(10)
2019–2020	Petrolul Ploiești	15	(2)
2020–2021	Argeș Pitești	5	(1)
2021–2022	Concordia Chiajna	23	(2)
2023	Gloria Bistrița-Năsăud		
2024	1599 Șelimbăr	10	(1)
2024–2025	Gloria Bistrița-Năsăud	0	(0)

Managerial career
- 2026: Viitorul Livezile
- * Club domestic league appearances and goals as of 12:26, 8 November 2024 (UTC)

Gabriel Deac (born 26 April 1995) is a Romanian former professional footballer who played as a midfielder and is currently the manager of Liga IV Bistrița-Năsăud County club Viitorul Livezile.

== Club career ==
Born in Bistrița, Deac started his youth career with local teams CSM Bistrița, Școala de Fotbal Viorel Moldovan and LPS Bistrița, before joining the Gheorghe Hagi Academy in 2012. He made his senior debut in 2014 with FC Voluntari in Liga II, helping the team win promotion to Liga I, where he subsequently made his top-flight debut. He later played for Petrolul Ploiești, Argeș Pitești, Concordia Chiajna, 1599 Șelimbăr and Gloria Bistrița-Năsăud. At the age of 30, after achieving promotion to Liga II with Gloria Bistrița-Năsăud, he retired from playing.

== Coaching career ==
In February 2026, he began his coaching career, taking charge of Viitorul Livezile in Liga IV Bistrița-Năsăud.

== Honours ==
Voluntari

- Liga II: 2014–15
- Cupa României: 2016–17
- Supercupa României: 2017
