= Pompeiu Hărășteanu =

Romanian opera singer

Pompeiu Hărășteanu (Romanian pronunciation: [pomˈpeju hərəʃˈte̯anu]; 14 September 1935 – 5 October 2016) was a Romanian operatic bass/basso profondo.

Born in Luduș, Hărășteanu was a graduate of the Ciprian Porumbescu Conservatory, Bucharest. He sang as a soloist for Oper Bonn, Germany, between 1968 and 1972. From 1972, he sang as a soloist of the National Opera in Bucharest. He was known for his low powerful voice and for opera roles such Osmin in Mozart's Die Entführung aus dem Serail and Sarastro in Die Zauberflöte.

In 2002 he was awarded the National Order of Merit, Knight rank. He died in Bucharest in 2016, at age 81, and was buried in the city's Bellu Cemetery.
