= Ovidiu Stoianof =

Romanian footballer

Personal information
- Date of birth: 28 June 1985 (age 41)
- Place of birth: Constanța, Romania
- Height: 1.82 m (6 ft 0 in)
- Position: Striker

Team information
- Current team: Viitorul Livezile
- Number: 9

Senior career*
Years	Team	Apps	(Gls)
2002	Callatis Mangalia	11	(1)
2003–2011	FC U Craiova	63	(3)
2005–2006	→ Juventus București (loan)	14	(2)
2006–2007	→ Universitatea Cluj (loan)	14	(4)
2009–2010	→ Internațional (loan)	25	(7)
2011–2012	ALRO Slatina	20	(2)
2012–2013	Farul Constanța	16	(0)
2013–2014	FC U Craiova	11	(1)
2014–2015	Caransebeș	5	(0)
2015	Sepsi OSK		
2016	Mureșul Vințu de Jos		
2016–2017	Metalurgistul Cugir	23	(14)
2017–2018	ACS Dumitra	14	(20)
2018–2023	Gloria Bistrița	74	(30)
2023–	Viitorul Livezile	13	(7)
- * Club domestic league appearances and goals as of 12:58, 8 November 2024 (UTC)

Ovidiu Stoianof (born 28 June 1985) is a Romanian footballer, who plays as a striker for Liga IV side Viitorul Livezile. In his career, Stoianof also played for teams such as Callatis Mangalia, FC U Craiova, Universitatea Cluj, ALRO Slatina or Farul Constanța, among others.
