= Sălard (river) =

Sălard Szalárd-patak
- Location within Romania

Location
- Country: Romania
- Counties: Mureș County

Physical characteristics
- Source
  - location: Gurghiu Mountains
- Mouth: Mureș
  - location: Sălard
  - coordinates: 46.949°N 25.075°E
- Length: 18 km (11 mi)
- Basin size: 126 km^{2} (49 sq mi)

Basin features
- Progression: Mureș→ Tisza→ Danube→ Black Sea
- Tributaries
  - left: Pârâul Rece, Șeșteni, Belciu
  - right: Pârâul Cald, Jirca

The Sălard (Hungarian: Szalárd-patak) is a small river in the Gurghiu Mountains, Mureș County, northern Romania. It is a left tributary of the river Mureș. It flows through the municipality Lunca Bradului, and joins the Mureș in the village Sălard. It is fed by several smaller streams, including the Pârâul Rece and Jirca. Its length is 18 km (11 mi) and its basin size is 126 km^{2} (49 sq mi).
