= József Lőrincz =

Romanian footballer

Personal information
- Date of birth: 13 April 1985 (age 41)
- Place of birth: Lunca Bradului, Romania
- Height: 1.82 m (6 ft 0 in)
- Position: Defender

Youth career
- –2003: Gloria Bistrița

Senior career*
Years	Team	Apps	(Gls)
2003–2006	Gloria Bistrița	9	(0)
2004–2005	Gloria II Bistrița	31	(2)
2006–2007	Dunărea Galați	19	(2)
2008–2009	Bihor Oradea	33	(3)
2009–2010	Gloria Buzău	41	(5)
2010	→Delta Tulcea (loan)	19	(0)
2010–2012	Victoria Brănești	23	(1)
2012	Botoșani	1	(0)
2012–2013	Unirea Slobozia	15	(1)
2013–2018	FK Csíkszereda		
2018–2019	MSE Târgu Mureș		
2019–2020	1. FC Gloria		
- * Club domestic league appearances and goals as of 10 September 2020

József Lőrincz (born 13 April 1985) is a Romanian professional footballer who plays as a defender.

== Career ==
On 6 February 2019, Lőrincz returned to Gloria Bistrița.
