= Sebastian Moga =

Romanian footballer

Personal information
- Full name: Ioan Sebastian Moga
- Date of birth: 18 December 1971 (age 54)
- Place of birth: Bistrița, Romania
- Position: Midfielder

Team information
- Current team: Gloria Bistrița (head coach)

Youth career
- –1989: Viitorul Târgu Mureș

Senior career*
Years	Team	Apps	(Gls)
1989–1991	Gloria Bistrița (Note: The statistics for the 1989–90 Divizia B season are unavailable.)	30	(3)
1991–1997	Dinamo București	128	(11)
1994	→ Universitatea Cluj (loan)	14	(0)
1996	→ Rapid București (loan)	5	(0)
1997–1998	Gloria Bistrița	24	(2)
1998	Ceahlăul Piatra Neamț	10	(1)
1999	Universitatea Cluj	4	(0)
1999	Rocar București	6	(3)
2000	Midia Năvodari	4	(0)
2000–2001	Kecskemét	16	(0)
2002–2003	Orosháza (Note: Only the statistics for the 2001–02 Nemzeti Bajnokság III season are available.)	1	(0)
2003	Gloria Bistrița	9	(1)
2004	Gaz Metan Mediaș	1	(0)
Total		252	(21)

International career
1989	Romania U18	1	(1)
1990	Romania Olympic	1	(0)
1990–1992	Romania U21	8	(1)
1991–1992	Romania	4	(0)

Managerial career
- 2006–2008: Pandurii Târgu Jiu (assistant)
- 2011–2013: Gloria Bistrița (assistant)
- 2013–2014: Corona Brașov (assistant)
- 2016–2017: Politehnica Iași (assistant)
- 2017–2019: Sepsi Sfântu Gheorghe (assistant)
- 2019–2020: Dinamo București (assistant)
- 2020–2021: Astra Giurgiu (assistant)
- 2023: Botoșani (assistant)
- 2025–2026: Petrolul Ploiești (assistant)
- 2026–: Gloria Bistrița
- * Club domestic league appearances and goals

Ioan Sebastian Moga (born 18 December 1971) is a former Romanian professional footballer who played as a midfielder, currently in charge of Liga II club Gloria Bistrița.

== Club career ==
Moga was born on 18 December 1971 in Bistrița, Romania and began playing junior-level football at Viitorul Târgu Mureș. In 1989, he started his senior career at Gloria Bistrița, helping them gain promotion to the first league at the end of the 1989–90 season. Subsequently, he made his Divizia A debut on 12 August 1990 under coach Remus Vlad in a 0–0 draw against Argeș Pitești.

In 1991, Moga went to play for Dinamo București. In his first season, he played 32 league games and scored four goals under coach Florin Halagian, as the capital side won the national championship undefeated. In the same season, he helped Dinamo eliminate Luis Figo's Sporting Lisbon with a 2–1 aggregate victory in the first round of the UEFA Cup, with their campaign ending in the following round as they lost to Genoa. Afterwards, he helped them get past Kuusysi Lahti in the first round of the 1992–93 Champions League. Midway through the 1993–94 season, Moga joined Universitatea Cluj for half a year before returning to Dinamo. He started the first half of the 1996–97 season at Rapid București and spent the second half back at Dinamo. During his time with Dinamo, he made 10 appearances in European competitions (including one match in the Intertoto Cup). Dinamo fans nicknamed him "Lombardo" after the famous Italian footballer Attilio Lombardo.

For the 1997–98 season, Moga returned to his hometown club Gloria. In 1998, he moved to Ceahlăul Piatra Neamț for a short spell, before making a comeback to Universitatea Cluj. In the following years, he played for Divizia B clubs Rocar București and Midia Năvodari, and in the Hungarian lower leagues for Kecskemét and Orosháza. In 2003, Moga went for a third spell at Gloria where he made his last Divizia A appearance on 28 November 2003 in a 1–0 away loss to Oțelul Galați, totaling 224 matches with 17 goals in the competition. He ended his career in 2004 at Divizia B club Gaz Metan Mediaș.

== International career ==
From 1989 to 1992, Moga was consistently featured for Romania's under-18, Olympic and under-21 sides.

Moga played four friendly games for Romania, making his debut on 23 May 1991, when coach Mircea Rădulescu sent him in the 54th minute to replace Pavel Badea in a 1–0 loss to Norway at Ullevaal stadium. His last appearance took place on 8 April 1992 in a 2–0 home win over Latvia.

== Honours ==
Gloria Bistrița

- Divizia B: 1989–90

Dinamo București

- Divizia A: 1991–92
