= Prodan =

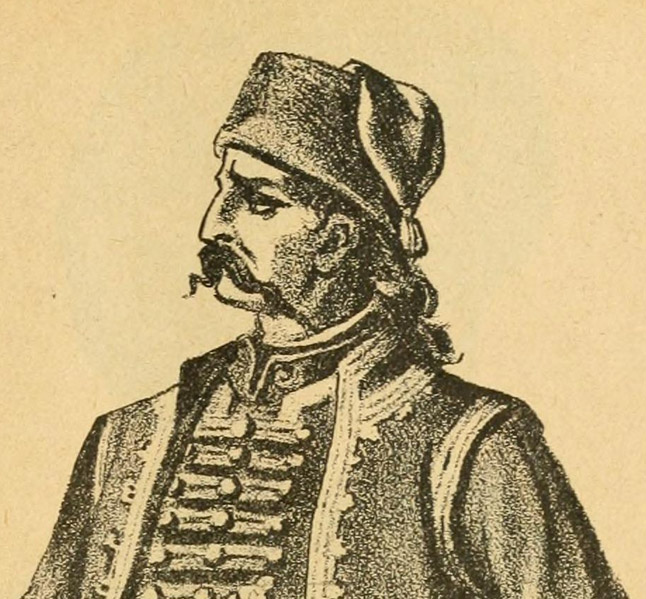
- Serbian Revolutionary Hadži-Prodan
- Gender: male
- Language: Croatian, Bulgarian

Origin
- Origin: Slavic prodati ("to sell")
- Meaning: "sold", used as protective name
- Region of origin: Balkans

Other names
- Alternative spelling: Продан (in Cyrillic)

Prodan (Bulgarian: Продан) is a South Slavic (Bulgarian, Serbian and Croatian) masculine given name, itself a passive adjective (prodan) from Slavic prodati–"to sell", hence meaning "sold". It is attested in Bulgarian and Croatian society since the Middle Ages. It is apotropaic (protective), found in Serbian naming culture along with popular names such as Vuk, Nenad, Staniša and others. Some adopted children were historically also given that byname. Variants and diminutives of the name found in Serbian culture include Prodanac (Проданац), Prodanko (Проданко), Proka (Прока), Proko (Проко), Prokašin (Прокашин), Prole (Проле), Proca (Проца), Proša (Проша), Projo (Пројо), and others. Variants and diminutives of the name found in Bulgarian culture include Prode (Проде), Prodyo (Продьо), Prodiyo (Продю), Prodanko (Проданко), Proyko (Пройко), Proye (Пройе), Proyo (Пройо), and others. The patronymic surnames Prodanić, Prodanov and Prodanović are derived from the name.

In Russia, Ukraine, Croatia, Italy, Romania and Moldova Prodan (Russian and Ukrainian: Продан) is found as a surname.

== People ==
=== Given name ===
- Prodan Gardzhev (1936–2003), Bulgarian Olympic wrestler
- Prodan Georgiev (1904–?), Bulgarian cyclist
- Prodan Rupar (1815–1877), Herzegovinian Serb rebel
- Prodan Tishkov (1860–1906), aka "Chardafon", Bulgarian revolutionary and cavalry officer

=== Surname ===
- Alla Prodan (born 1950), badminton player
- Andrea Prodan (born 1961), Scottish-Italian film actor, composer and musician
- Ciprian Prodan (born 1979), Romanian footballer
- Daniel Prodan (1972–2016), Romanian footballer
- Dănuț Prodan (born 1985), Romanian footballer
- Ion Prodan (footballer) (born 1992), Moldovan footballer
- Luca Prodan (1953–1987), Italian-Argentine musician
- Oksana Prodan (born 1974), Ukrainian politician
- Vasyl Prodan (born 1972), acting mayor of Chernivtsi city, businessman, philanthropist
- Yuriy Prodan (born 1959), Ukrainian politician

== Sources ==
- Gandev, Khristo (1972). Bŭlgarskata narodnost prez 15 [i.e. petnadeseti] vek: Demogr. i etnogr. izsledvane. Nauka i izkustvo.
- Grković, Milica (1977). Rečnik ličnih imena kod Srba. Belgrade: Vuk Karadžić.
- Barjaktarović, Mirko (1986). Pantelić, Nikola (ed.). "O srodničkim nazivima". Гласник Етнографског музеја у Београду. 50. Belgrade: Etnografski muzej u Beogradu: 164.

== See also ==
- Hadži-Prodan Gligorijević (1760–1825), Serbian revolutionary
