= Alin Chibulcutean =

Romanian professional football player

Personal information
- Full name: Alin Nicu Chibulcutean
- Date of birth: 20 November 1978 (age 47)
- Place of birth: Sărmașu, România
- Height: 1.80 m (5 ft 11 in)
- Position: Centre back

Youth career
- –1995: Gloria Bistrița

Senior career*
Years	Team	Apps	(Gls)
1995–2002	Gloria Bistrița	2	(0)
1998–1999	→ Unirea Dej (loan)	2	(0)
2002–2004	Armătura Zalău (Note: The statistics for the 2002–03 Divizia C season are unavailable.)	22	(0)
2004–2006	Gloria Bistrița	29	(0)
2005	→ Gloria II Bistrița (loan)	6	(0)
2006–2010	Pandurii Târgu Jiu	132	(1)
2011–2013	Pandurii II Târgu Jiu		
2013–2014	Gloria Bistrița	21	(0)
2014–2015	FC Bistrița		
2015–2019	ACS Dumitra	72	(9)
Total		286	(10)
- * Club domestic league appearances and goals as of 22 May 2021

Alin Nicu Chibulcutean (born 20 November 1978, Sărmașu) is a Romanian former professional football player who played as a centre back.

== Honours ==
Armătura Zalău

- Divizia C: 2002–03
