= Lucian Colceriu =

Romania international rugby union player

- Born: Lucian Colceriu; 8 September 1968 (age 58) Lunca Bradului, Romania
- Height: 5 ft 11 in (180 cm)
- Weight: 174 lb (79 kg)

Rugby union career
- Position: Wing
Senior career
| Years | Team | Apps | (Points) |
| 1989–1998 | Steaua București | | |
International career
| Years | Team | Apps | (Points) |
| 1991–1998 | Romania | 26 | (35) |

Lucian Colceriu (born 8 September 1968 in Lunca Bradului) is a Romanian former rugby union footballer who played as a wing.

== Club career ==
During his career Colceriu played mostly for Romanian club Steaua București.

== International career ==
Colceriu gathered 26 caps for Romania, from his debut in 1991 to his last game in 1998. He scored 7 tries during his international career, 35 points on aggregate. He was a member of his national side for the 2nd and 3rd Rugby World Cups in 1991 and 1995 and played 4 group matches without scoring.

== Honours ==
Steaua București

- Divizia Națională: 1991-92
