= Luduș =

- Town
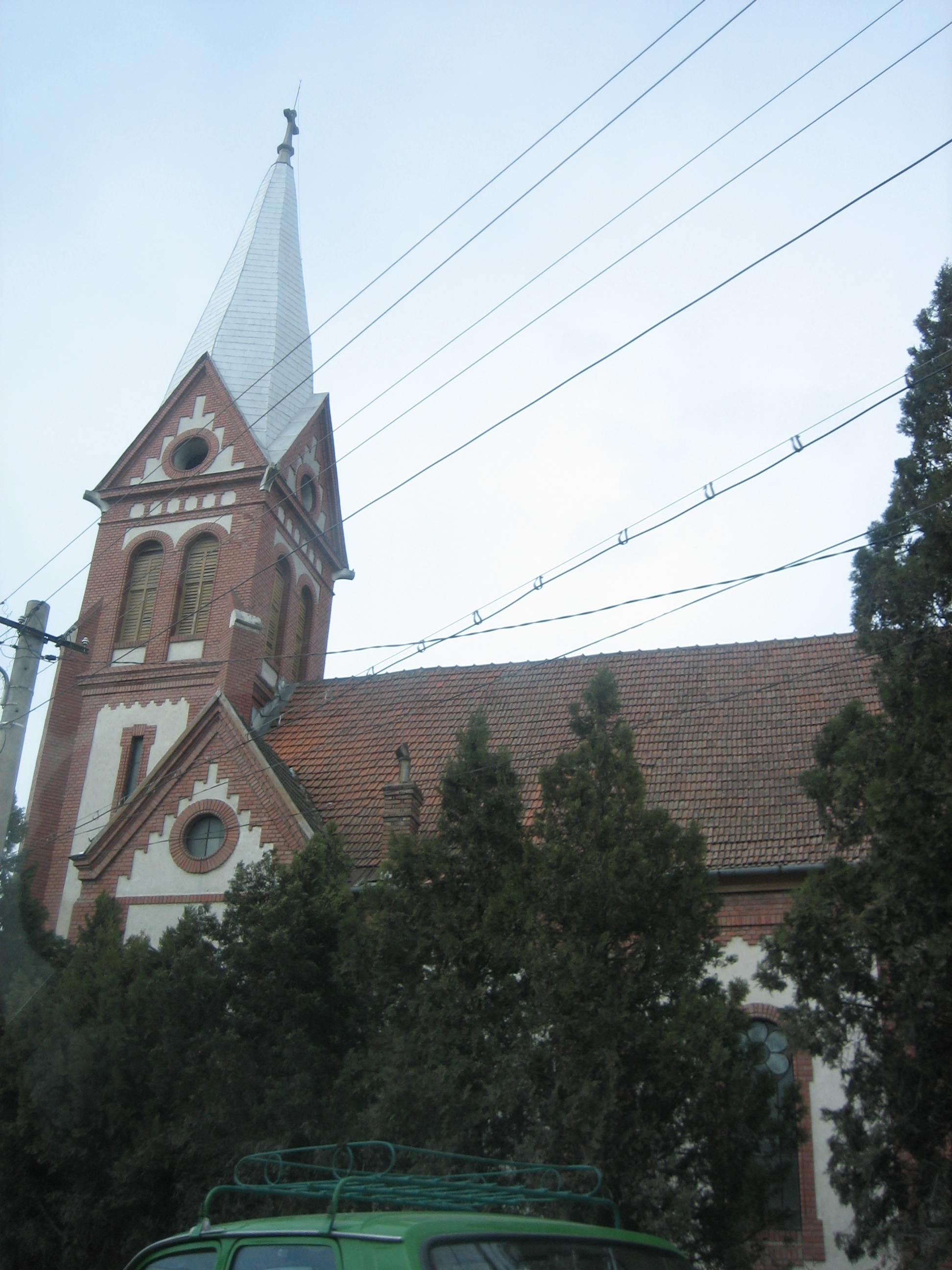
- Roman Catholic church in Luduș

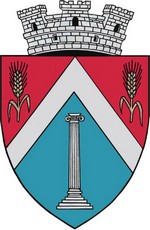
- Coat of arms

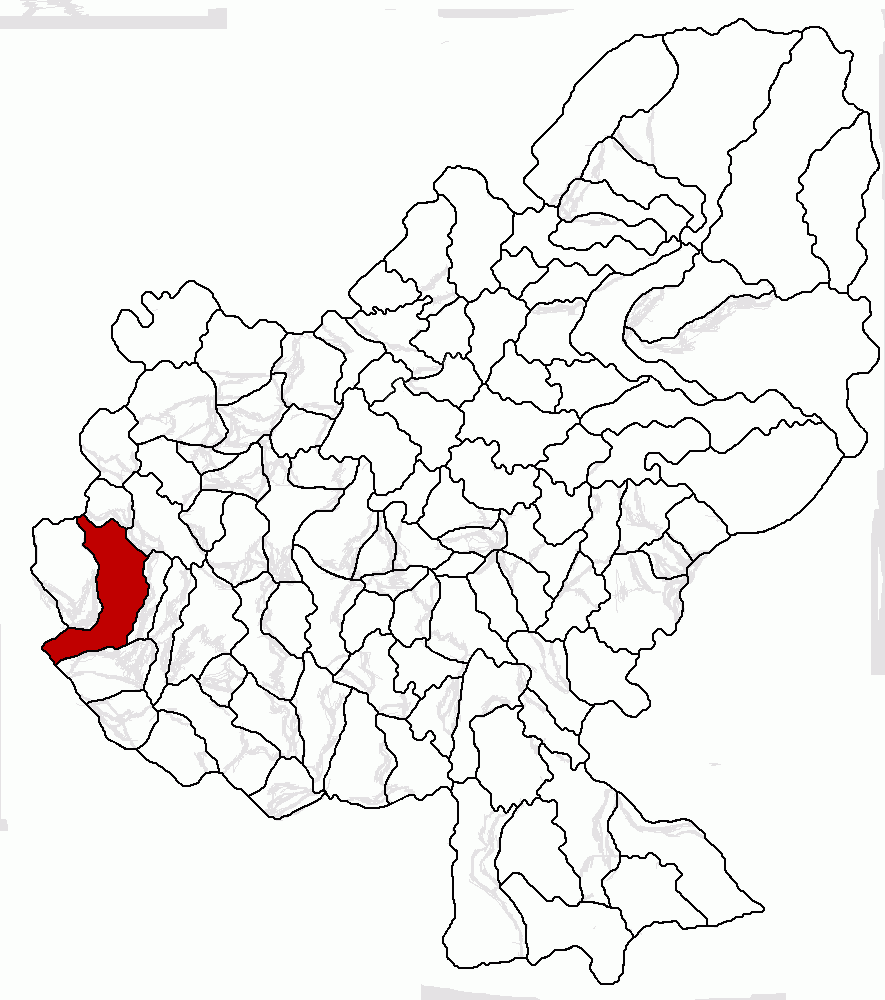
- Location in Mureș County

- Location in Romania
- Coordinates: 46°28′40″N 24°5′46″E
- Country: Romania
- County: Mureș

Government
  - Mayor (2024–2028): Cristian Moldovan (PSD)
- Area: 67 km^{2} (26 sq mi)
- Elevation: 274 m (899 ft)
- Population (2021-12-01): 14,757
  - Density: 220/km^{2} (570/sq mi)
- Time zone: UTC+02:00 (EET)
  - Summer (DST): UTC+03:00 (EEST)
- Postal code: 545200
- Area code: (+40) 02 65
- Vehicle reg.: MS
- Website: www.ludus.ro

Luduș (Romanian pronunciation: [ˈluduʃ]; Hungarian: Marosludas or Ludas; Hungarian pronunciation: [ˈmɒroʃludɒʃ], German: Ludasch) is a town in Transylvania, Romania in Mureș County, 44 km (27 mi) south-west from the county's capital, Târgu Mureș.

Six villages are administered by the town: Avrămești (Eckentelep), Cioarga (Csorga), Ciurgău (Csorgó), Fundătura (Mezőalbisitelep or Belsőtelep), Gheja (Marosgezse), and Roșiori (Andrássytelep).

== History ==
- 1330 – First mentioned as Plehanus de Ludas.
- 1377 – Mentioned in a transaction between two Hungarian nobles.
- 1930 – 5,085 inhabitants.
- 1940 to 1944, Hungarians occupied the town. The Jewish population is murdered during the Luduș massacre from 5 to 13 September 1944.
- 1960 - Luduș became a town.
- 1966 - 11,794 inhabitants.
- 2002 - 17,497 inhabitants.

== Demographics ==
In 1850, the town had 1,166 inhabitants; the ethnic composition of the town according to the 1850 census was: 1,065 (91.34%) Romanians and 34 (2.92%) Hungarians. In 1910, the town had 4,632 inhabitants; the ethnic composition of the town according to the 1910 census was: 3,116 (67.27%) Hungarians and 1,385 (29.9%) Romanians.

At the 2011 census, it had a population of 15,328; out of them, 65.9% were Romanians, 23.2% Hungarians, and 6.3% Roma. At the 2021 census, Luduș had a population of 14,757; of those, 63.69% were Romanians, 18.87% Hungarians, and 7.79% Roma.

Demographic movement of the population according to the census data:

== Notable people ==
- Dănuț Borbil (born 1973), professional Romanian arm-wrestler
- Andreo Cseh (1895–1979), Hungarian/Dutch Roman Catholic priest
- Cornel Gheți (born 1986), Romanian footballer
- Pompeiu Hărășteanu (1935–2016), Romanian operatic bass/basso profondo
- Ella Kovacs (born 1964), Romanian middle-distance runner
- Sergiu Mândrean (born 1978), Romanian footballer
- Horațiu Pungea (born 1986), Romanian rugby union player
- László Sepsi (born 1987), Romanian footballer
- Tara (von Neudorf) (born 1974), Romanian artist

== See also ==
- List of Hungarian exonyms (Mureș County)
