= Călin Albuț =

Romanian footballer

Personal information
- Full name: Septimiu Călin Albuț
- Date of birth: 23 May 1981 (age 45)
- Place of birth: Bistrița, Romania
- Height: 1.82 m (6 ft 0 in)
- Position: Goalkeeper

Team information
- Current team: Gloria Bistrița (GK coach)

Youth career
- 1993–1999: CSȘ Bistrița

Senior career*
Years	Team	Apps	(Gls)
1999–2000	Hârtia Prundu Bârgăului		
2000–2004	FC Baia Mare	36	(0)
2004–2011	Gloria Bistrița	149	(0)
2011–2012	FCM Târgu Mureș	23	(0)
2012–2013	Rapid București	6	(0)
2013–2014	Gloria Bistrița	29	(0)
2014	Săgeata Năvodari	14	(0)
2015	Viitorul Constanța	13	(0)
2016	Gaz Metan Mediaș	7	(0)
2016–2017	Botoșani	5	(0)
2017–2019	Universitatea Cluj	10	(0)
2019–2021	Gloria Bistrița	29	(0)
Total		321	(0)

Managerial career
- 2017–2019: Universitatea Cluj (player/GK coach)
- 2021–: Gloria Bistrița (GK coach)
- * Club domestic league appearances and goals

Septimiu Călin Albuț (born 23 May 1981) is a Romanian former professional footballer who played as a goalkeeper, currently goalkeeping coach at Liga II club Gloria Bistrița.

== Honours ==
Gloria Bistrița

- UEFA Intertoto Cup runner-up: 2007

Gaz Metan Mediaș

- Liga II: 2015–16

Universitatea Cluj

- Liga III: 2017–18
