= Costinel Gugu =

Romanian footballer

Personal information
- Full name: Dănuț Costinel Ionuț Gugu
- Date of birth: 20 May 1992 (age 34)
- Place of birth: Craiova, Romania
- Height: 1.85 m (6 ft 1 in)
- Position: Centre-back

Team information
- Current team: Filiași
- Number: 23

Youth career
- 2002–2009: Universitatea Craiova

Senior career*
Years	Team	Apps	(Gls)
2010–2011	FC U Craiova	9	(0)
2011–2014	ASA Târgu Mureș	28	(2)
2012	→ Turnu Severin (loan)	5	(0)
2015	Metalul Reșița	0	(0)
2015–2016	Le Havre	3	(0)
2016	→ Mioveni (loan)	8	(1)
2016–2018	Mioveni	51	(3)
2018–2019	Argeș Pitești	12	(0)
2019–2021	FC U Craiova	36	(3)
2021–2022	Universitatea Cluj	17	(1)
2022	Steaua București	6	(0)
2023	Gloria Bistrița	4	(0)
2023–	Filiași	5	(0)

International career^{‡}
2011	Romania U-19	3	(0)
2011–2012	Romania U-21	4	(0)
- * Club domestic league appearances and goals as of 12:02, 15 January 2024 (UTC) ‡ National team caps and goals as of 12 March 2019

Costinel Ionuț Gugu (born 20 May 1992 in Craiova) is a Romanian footballer who plays as a centre-back for CSO Filiași. In his career, Gugu also played for teams such as FC U Craiova 1948, CS Mioveni, ASA Târgu Mureș, Le Havre or Universitatea Cluj, among others.

== International career ==
Gugu played with the Romania U-19 at the 2011 UEFA European Under-19 Football Championship, which took place in Romania. He made his debut for under-19 team in the same tournament on 20 July 2011 in a game against Czech Republic U-19.

== Honours ==
FC U Craiova 1948

- Liga II: 2020–21
- Liga III: 2019–20
