= Dănuț Borbil =

Romanian arm wrestler

Dănuț "Uriașul" Borbil
- Born: Dănuț Borbil; July 13, 1973 (age 52) (Romania) Luduș
- Occupation: Arm wrestler
- Height: 1.88 m (6 ft 2 in)
- Title: National champion

Dănuț Borbil (born February 18, 1973, in Luduș) is a professional Romanian armwrestler, the current national champion for the left arm, and vice-champion for the right arm. At 162 kilograms (357 lb) he is the heaviest professional armwrestling participant from Romania.

== Biography ==
Dănuț Borbil first competed in a professional armwrestling championship at the Baia Mare Grand Prix in 2006 finishing fifth in both the left and the right arm competitions. After this championship he signed a contract with Edy Gym in Luduș that stated he would represent this club in every competition he entered including national, European and world championships. His first important title was first place at the annual Iron Arms Luduș championship held in 2006. He won his first national title in 2007 at the National Armwrestling Championships held in Bucharest, when he became national champion for the left arm and vice-champion for the right arm.

In 2007 he participated at the Tsvetan Gashevski Cup, named after the Bulgarian armwrestler Tsvetan Gashevski, held in Gorna Oryahovitsa, Bulgaria where he won second place for the left arm and third place for the right arm. At the annual Iron Arms Luduș championship held in 2008 he won first place for both the left and the right arms. Again he competed at the National Armwrestling Championships held in Bucharest in 2008 where he became vice-champion for the left arm but did not compete for the right arm championship because of an injury to the shoulder.

In 2009 he participated at the National Armwrestling Championships held in Bucharest where he became national champion for the left arm and vice-champion for the right arm. After this achievement he participated at the European Championships held in Sofia, Bulgaria where he won third place for the left arm and seventh place for the right arm. In 2010 he lost his left hand national title in the +110 kg against Ioan Puscasu, but he won it again in 2011, maintaining his vice-champion title for the right hand. He managed to win the national title once again in 2012, and he was 3rd with the right hand.

In 2013 he became the national champion of the +110 kg category with both arms. He also competed in the World Armwrestling Championships and he managed to win a silver medal, becoming the vice-world champion with the left hand.

In 2014 he competed in both categories (Masters and Seniors). He won the masters category with both arms, and he also managed to win a bronze medal in the seniors class with left hand.

== Arm wrestling championships ==
| Year | Placement | Location | Comments |
|---|---|---|---|
| 2007 | 1 and 2 | (Romania) Bucharest | NCH (1st place for the left arm and second place for the right arm) |
| 2008 | 1 | (Romania) Bucharest | NCH (1st place for the left arm) |
| 2009 | 1 and 2 | (Romania) Bucharest | NCH (1st place for the left arm and second place for the right arm) |
| 2009 | 3 and 7 | (Bulgaria) Sofia | ECH (3rd place for the left arm and 7th place for the right arm) |
| 2010 | 2 and 2 | (Romania) Bucharest | NCH (2nd place for the left arm and 2nd place for the right arm) |
| 2011 | 1 and 2 | (Romania) Bucharest | NCH (1st place for the left arm and 2nd place for the right arm) |
| 2012 | 1 and 3 | (Romania) Bucharest | NCH (1st place for the left arm and 3rd place for the right arm) |
| 2013 | 1 and 1 | (Romania) Bucharest | NCH (1st place for the left arm and 1st place for the right arm) |
| 2013 | 2 | (Poland) Gdynia | WCH (2nd place for the left arm in the masters category) |
| 2014 | 1 and 1 | (Romania) Codlea | NCH (1st place for the left arm and 1st place for the right arm) |
