= Lunca Bradului =

- Commune
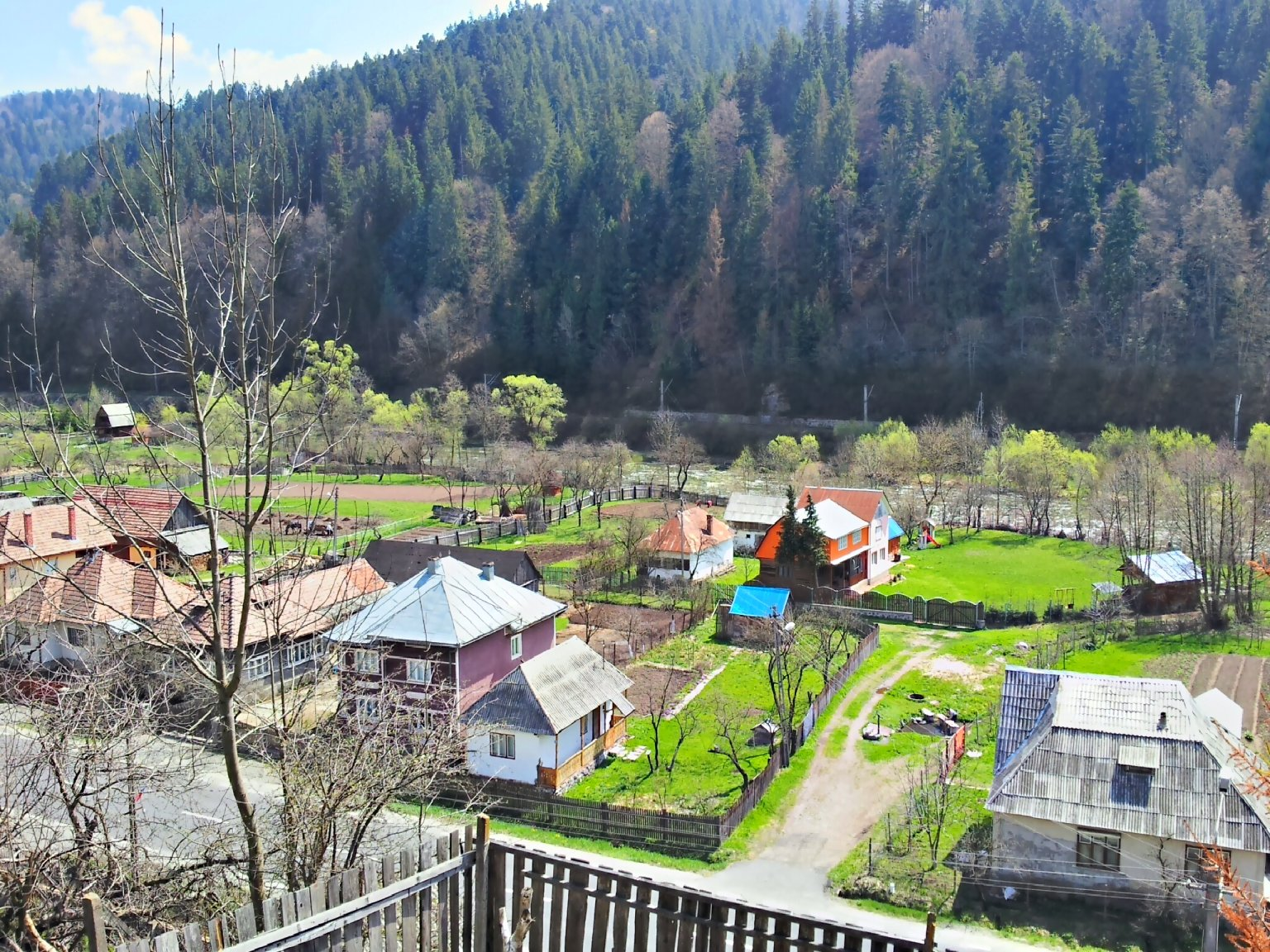
- Lunca Bradului

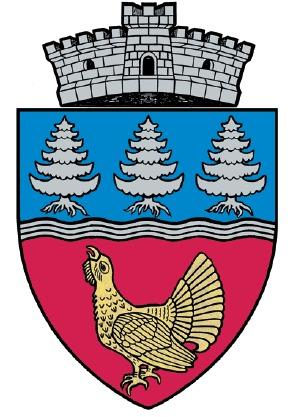
- Coat of arms

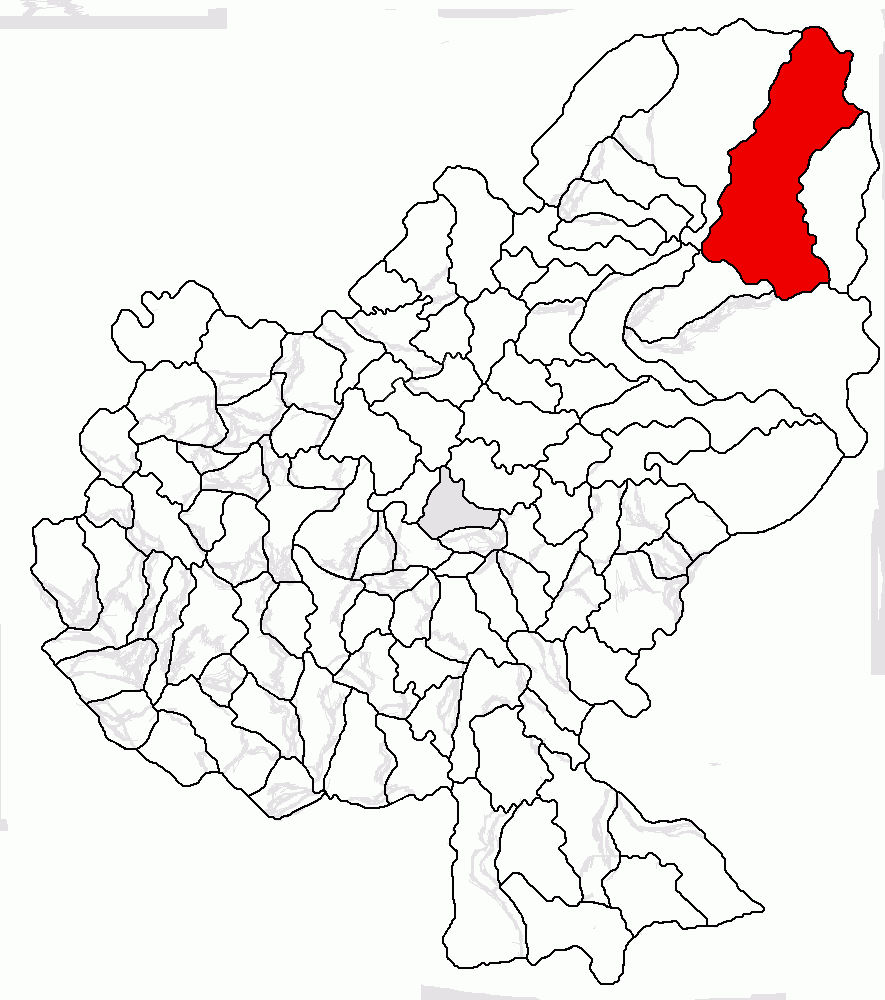
- Location in Mureș County

- Location in Romania
- Coordinates: 46°57′N 25°6′E
- Country: Romania
- County: Mureș

Government
  - Mayor (2020–2024): Alexandru Bexa (PSD)
- Area: 310.33 km^{2} (119.82 sq mi)
- Elevation: 602 m (1,975 ft)
- Population (2021-12-01): 1,666
  - Density: 5.368/km^{2} (13.90/sq mi)
- Time zone: UTC+02:00 (EET)
  - Summer (DST): UTC+03:00 (EEST)
- Postal code: 547380
- Area code: (+40) 02 65
- Vehicle reg.: MS
- Website: comunaluncabradului.ro

Lunca Bradului (Hungarian: Palotailva, Hungarian pronunciation: [ˈpɒlotɒilvɒ]) is a commune in Mureș County, Transylvania, Romania. It is composed of three villages: Lunca Bradului, Neagra (Nyágra), and Sălard (Szalárd).

== Geography ==
The commune is situated at the foot of the Călimani and Gurghiu mountains, at an altitude of about 600 m (2,000 ft). It lies on the banks of the river Mureș and its tributaries, the rivers Ilva and Sălard. The Călimani National Park and the Defileul Mureșului Superior Natural Park are partly located on the territory of the commune.

Lunca Bradului is located in the northeastern extremity of Mureș County, 47 km (30 mi) from Reghin and 80 km (50 mi) from the county seat, Târgu Mureș, on the border with the Bistrița-Năsăud and Suceava counties. It is crossed west to east by national road DN15 (part of European route E578), which connects Transylvania (starting in Turda) to Western Moldavia (ending in Bacău). The Lunca Bradului train station serves the CFR Main Line 400, which connects Brașov with Baia Mare and Satu Mare.

== Demographics ==
Historical population
Year	Pop.	±%
1850	246	—
1920	1,413	+474.4%
1966	2,665	+88.6%
2002	2,150	−19.3%
2011	2,035	−5.3%
2021	1,666	−18.1%
Source: Census data

At the 2021 census, the commune had a population of 1,666, of which 80.73% were Romanians, 8.34% Hungarians, and 4.32% Roma.

== Natives ==
- Lucian Colceriu (born 1968), rugby union footballer
- József Lőrincz (born 1985), footballer

== See also ==
- List of Hungarian exonyms (Mureș County)
