= CSM Roman =

Romanian sports club

- Full name: Clubul Sportiv Municipal Roman
- Nicknames: Țevarii (The Pipes Makers)
- Founded: 1954
- Colours: Purple, Yellow
- Chairman: Maricel Benchea
- Website: csmroman.ro

CSM Roman is a Romanian sports club from Roman, Romania, founded in 1954.
