= George Neagu =

Romanian footballer

Personal information
- Full name: George Alexandru Neagu
- Date of birth: 24 April 1985 (age 41)
- Place of birth: Orăștie, Romania
- Height: 1.78 m (5 ft 10 in)
- Position: Defender

Team information
- Current team: Gloria Bistrița (assistant/fitness coach)

Youth career
- –2005: Sporting Pitești

Senior career*
Years	Team	Apps	(Gls)
2005–2007	Minerul Lupeni	55	(1)
2007–2008	Progresul București	11	(0)
2008–2009	Dacia Mioveni	33	(1)
2009–2010	Internațional Curtea de Argeș	21	(1)
2010–2011	Pandurii Târgu Jiu	1	(0)
2010	→ UTA Arad (loan)	13	(1)
2011	Mioveni	8	(0)
2012–2014	UTA Arad	52	(2)
2014–2015	ACS Poli Timișoara	25	(0)
2016	Gaz Metan Mediaș	13	(0)
2016–2018	ACS Poli Timișoara	23	(0)
Total		255	(6)

Managerial career
- 2018–2019: Dunărea Călărași (fitness coach)
- 2019: Astra Giurgiu (fitness coach)
- 2019: Hermannstadt (fitness coach)
- 2020: Dinamo București (fitness coach)
- 2020–2021: Hermannstadt (fitness coach)
- 2021: Dinamo București (fitness coach)
- 2021: Metalurgistul Cugir (fitness coach)
- 2021–2022: Argeș Pitești (fitness coach)
- 2023–2024: Gloria Buzău (fitness coach)
- 2026–: Gloria Bistrița (assistant/fitness coach)
- * Club domestic league appearances and goals

George Alexandru Neagu (born 24 April 1985) is a former Romanian professional footballer who played as a defender, currently assistant coach and fitness coach at Liga II club Gloria Bistrița.

== Honours ==
=== Club ===
ACS Poli Timișoara

- Liga II: 2014–15

Gaz Metan Mediaș

- Liga II: 2015–16
