= Roberto Ayza =

Brazilian footballer (born 1981)

Personal information
- Full name: Roberto Ayza Berça
- Date of birth: 19 May 1981 (age 45)
- Place of birth: São Caetano do Sul, Brazil
- Height: 1.72 m (5 ft 7 1/2 in)
- Position: Forward

Senior career*
Years	Team	Apps	(Gls)
2006–2007	Cetatea Suceava	16	(5)
2007–2008	Ceahlăul Piatra Neamț	16	(2)
2008–2009	Bihor Oradea	46	(7)
2009–2012	Mioveni	83	(22)
2012–2013	Gloria Bistrița	13	(0)
2013–2019	Mioveni	176	(32)
2019–2020	Muscelul Câmpulung	8	(2)
Total		358	(70)
- * Club domestic league appearances and goals as of 12 July 2019

Roberto Ayza Berça (born 19 May 1981) is a Brazilian former football forward. He played for various Romanian teams such as: Cetatea Suceava, Ceahlăul Piatra Neamț, Bihor Oradea, Gloria Bistrița or CS Mioveni.

== Career ==
Ayza started football really late after the age of 23. He went to Romania alone, without knowing anyone and without ever leaving Brazil before.

The coach who received him for the first time on a professional team in Brazil had taken Ayza with him everywhere. At one of the teams, the president asked Ayza if he doesn't want to go to Romania, where he had a friend who wanted players. He was 23 at the time. He would have earned $5,000 in Romania, whilst in Brazil he was earning only $120.

== Personal life ==
Ayza married a Romanian volleyball player, Gabriela, with whom he has 2 children.
