= Ilva (Mureș) =

Ilva Ilva patak
- Location within Romania

Location
- Country: Romania
- Counties: Mureș County

Physical characteristics
- Mouth: Mureș
  - location: Lunca Bradului
  - coordinates: 46.9549°N 25.1275°E
- Length: 23 km (14 mi)
- Basin size: 126 km^{2} (49 sq mi)

Basin features
- Progression: Mureș→ Tisza→ Danube→ Black Sea

The Ilva (Hungarian: Ilva-patak, Ilva) is a right tributary of the river Mureș in Transylvania, Romania. It discharges into the Mureș in Lunca Bradului. Its length is 23 km (14 mi) and its basin size is 126 km^{2} (49 sq mi).

== Tributaries ==
The following rivers are tributaries to the river Ilva:

- Left: Ilișoara Mare, Unguraș
- Right: Negoiu, Pârâul Pietros, Tinul
