= Dănuț Matei =

Romanian footballer

Personal information
- Full name: Danut Matei
- Date of birth: 30 December 1966 (age 59)
- Place of birth: Sighetu Marmației, Romania
- Height: 1.78 m (5 ft 10 in)
- Position: Forward

Youth career
- CIL Sighetu Marmației

Senior career*
| Years | Team | Apps | (Gls) |
| 1981–1985 | CIL Sighetu Marmației | 61 | (23) |
| 1986–1988 | Universitatea Cluj | 6 | (1) |
| 1988–1994 | CFR Cluj | 105+ | (38+) |
| 1994–2001 | Gloria Bistrița | 176 | (40) |
| Total | | 348+ | (102+) |

Managerial career
- 2001–2009: Gloria II Bistrița
- 2009–2014: Gaz Metan Mediaș (assistant)
- 2014–2015: Gaz Metan Mediaș
- 2015: CFR Cluj (assistant)
- 2017–2018: ACS Dumitra
- 2018–2021: Gloria Bistrița
- * Club domestic league appearances and goals as of 07:57, 1 October 2021 (UTC)

Danut Matei, commonly known as Dan Matei, (born 30 December 1966) is a Romanian former professional footballer who played as a forward for: CIL Sighet, Universitatea Cluj, CFR Cluj, and Gloria Bistrița. After retirement Matei started his football manager career being the manager of Gloria Bistrița's second team, Gaz Metan Mediaș, CFR Cluj or ACS Dumitra.
