= Jean Pădureanu Stadium =

Football stadium in Bistrița, Romania

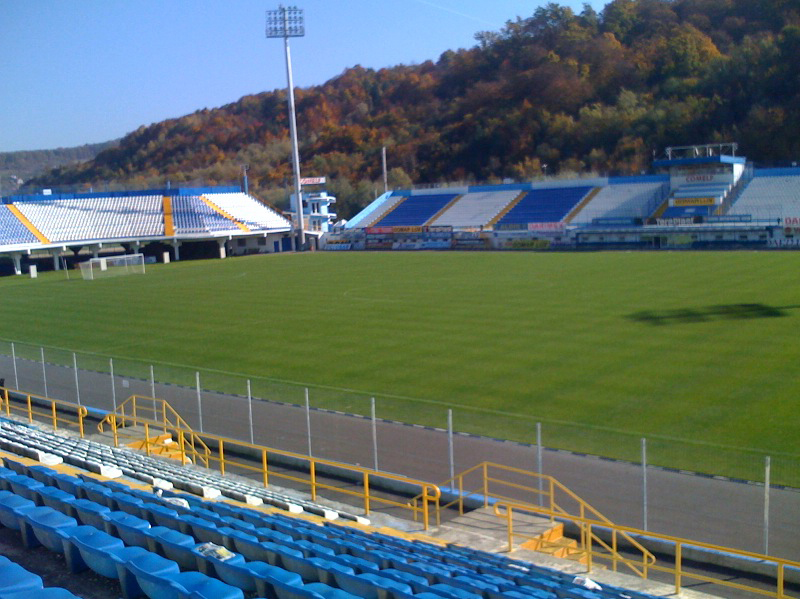
- The stadium in 2008
- Interactive map of Jean Pădureanu Stadium
- Former names: Gloria Municipal Stadium(1963–2013)
- Address: Str. Parcului, nr. 3
- Location: Bistrița, Romania
- Coordinates: 47°07′51″N 24°30′10″E
- Owner: Municipality of Bistrița
- Operator: Gloria Bistrița-Năsăud
- Capacity: 7,800 seated
- Surface: Grass

Construction
- Opened: 29 May 1930
- Renovated: 2008

Tenants
- ACF Gloria Bistrița (1963–2015); Gloria Bistrița-Năsăud (2018–present)

The Jean Pădureanu Stadium is a multi-purpose stadium in Bistrița, Romania. It is currently used mostly for football matches and is the home ground of CS Gloria Bistrița, considered the unofficial successor of ACF Gloria Bistrița. The stadium is named after the former president of Gloria Bistrița, Jean Pădureanu.

== See also ==
- List of football stadiums in Romania
