= Dănuț Prodan =

Romanian footballer

Dănuţ Prodan
Personal information
- Full name: Dănuţ Tănăsel Prodan
- Date of birth: 13 January 1985 (age 41)
- Place of birth: Bacău, Romania
- Height: 1.74 m (5 ft 8 1/2 in)
- Position: Striker

Youth career
- –2009: Ştiinţa Bacău

Senior career*
Years	Team	Apps	(Gls)
2009	Ceahlăul Piatra Neamţ	11	(0)
2010	Farul Constanţa	1	(1)
2010–2011	Gloria Buzău	41	(11)
2011–2012	CF Brăila	12	(1)
2013	CS Otopeni	6	(1)
2013–2015	Callatis Mangalia	?	(?)
Total		71	(14)
- * Club domestic league appearances and goals as of 25 February 2018

Dănuţ Tănăsel Prodan (born 13 January 1985) is a Romanian former footballer.
