= FC Bistrița =

- Full name: Fotbal Club Bistrița
- Nickname(s): Bistrițenii (The Bistrița People)
- Founded: 2013
- Dissolved: 2017
- Ground: Jean Pădureanu
- Capacity: 7,800
- 2016–17: Liga III, Seria V, 15th (relegated)
Home colours	Away colours

FC Bistrița was a Romanian football team from Bistrița, founded in 2013 and dissolved in 2017.

== History ==
After founding, the club entered in the Liga V Bistrița-Năsăud County and after one season they won it and promoted to Liga IV Bistrița-Năsăud County. After only two seasons at this level, FC Bistrița won the championship and qualified for the 2015–16 Liga IV promotion play-off, where after a highly disputed double against Suceava County champion, they managed to promote to Liga III.

In Liga III the club encountered serious financial problems, and shortly after the start of the second part of the championship it withdrew and then was dissolved.

== Stadium ==
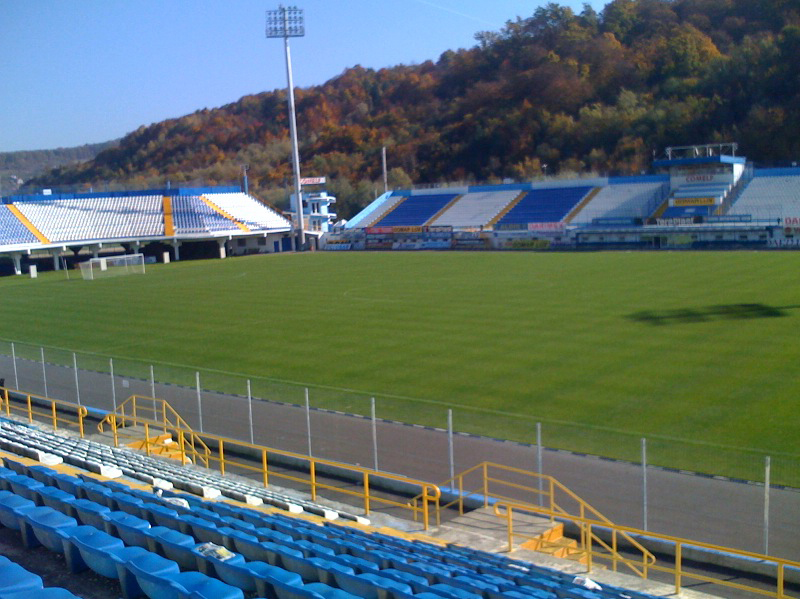
Stadionul Jean Pădureanu.

At the beginning the club played its home matches on IPROEB Stadium, in Bistrița. After the dissolution of Gloria Bistrița in 2015, they moved on Jean Pădureanu Stadium and shared the stadium with Academia Gloria, one of the successors of the old club, until 2017 when FC Bistrița was dissolved.

== Honours ==
Liga IV – Bistrița-Năsăud County

- Winners (1): 2015–16

Liga V – Bistrița-Năsăud County

- Winners (1): 2013–14
